= 2020–21 Barnsley F.C. season =

Barnsley F.C.
2020–21 season
- Owner: International Investment Consortium (80%); James Cryne/The Cryne Family (20%)
- Chairman: Chien Lee (co-chairman); Paul Conway (co-chairman)
- Head coach: Gerhard Struber (until 6 October); Valerien Ismael (from 23 October)
- Stadium: Oakwell
- Championship: 5th (lost in play-off semi-finals against Swansea City)
- FA Cup: Fifth round
- EFL Cup: Third round
- Top goalscorer: League: Cauley Woodrow (12 goals); All: Cauley Woodrow (15 goals)
Home colours	Away colours	Third colours

The 2020–21 season was the 134th season in existence of Barnsley Football Club and the club's second consecutive season in the second division of English football. In addition to the domestic league, Barnsley participated in this season's editions of the FA Cup, and the EFL Cup.

== Squad ==
As of 18 January 2021

Note: Flags indicate national team as has been defined under FIFA eligibility rules. Players may hold more than one non-FIFA nationality.

No.	Name	Nat.	Position(s)	Date of birth (age)	Apps.	Goals	Year signed	Signed from	Transfer fee	Ends
Goalkeepers
1	Jack Walton	(England)	GK	23 April 1998 (age 28)	43	0	2015	Academy	Trainee	2023
31	Henry Kendrick	(England)	GK	3 December 2000 (age 25)	0	0	2019	Academy	Trainee	2021
40	Bradley Collins	(England)	GK	18 February 1997 (age 29)	48	0	2019	(England) Chelsea	Free	2023
Defenders
2	Jordan Williams	(England)	RB/CB	22 October 1999 (age 27)	73	2	2018	(England) Huddersfield Town	Undisclosed	2023
3	Ben Williams	(Wales) (England)	LB	31 March 1999 (age 27)	36	0	2017	(England) Blackburn Rovers	Free	2022
5	Liam Kitching	(England) (Republic of Ireland)	CB	1 October 1999 (age 27)	1	0	2021	(England) Forest Green Rovers	£600,000	2024
6	Mads Juel Andersen	(Denmark)	CB	27 December 1997 (age 28)	89	1	2019	(Denmark) Horsens	Undisclosed	2023
7	Callum Brittain	(England)	RB	12 March 1998 (age 28)	40	0	2020	(England) Milton Keynes Dons	Undisclosed	2023
20	Toby Sibbick	(England)	RB/CB/DM	23 May 1999 (age 27)	40	0	2019	(England) AFC Wimbledon	Undisclosed	2023
22	Clarke Oduor	(Kenya) (England)	LB	25 June 1999 (age 27)	32	1	2019	(England) Leeds United	Undisclosed	2023
24	Aapo Halme	(Finland)	CB/DM	22 May 1998 (age 28)	55	4	2019	(England) Leeds United	£200,000	2022
26	Michael Sollbauer	(Austria)	CB/RB	15 May 1990 (age 36)	61	0	2020	(Austria) Wolfsberger AC	£450,000	2022
30	Michał Helik	(Poland)	CB/RB	9 September 1995 (age 31)	45	6	2020	(Poland) KS Cracovia	£720,000	2023
34	Jasper Moon	(England)	CB	24 November 2000 (age 25)	3	0	2020	Academy	Trainee	Unidsclosed
Midfielders
4	Callum Styles	(England)	AM/CM/LM	28 March 2000 (age 26)	71	6	2018	(England) Bury	Undisclosed	2023
8	Herbie Kane	(England)	CM/AM/DM	23 November 1998 (age 27)	25	0	2020	(England) Liverpool	£1,250,000	2024
21	Romal Palmer	(England)	CM/RM/LM	30 September 1998 (age 28)	38	1	2018	Academy	Trainee	2022
27	Alex Mowatt	(England) (Scotland)	CM/AM	13 February 1995 (age 31)	159	20	2017	(England) Leeds United	£600,000	2021
Forwards
9	Cauley Woodrow	(England)	CF/SS	2 December 1994 (age 31)	124	47	2019	(England) Fulham	£765,000	2023
10	Daryl Dike	(United States) (Nigeria)	CF	3 June 2000 (age 26)	18	9	2020	(United States) Orlando City	Loan	End of Season
11	Conor Chaplin	(England)	CF/SS/RW	16 February 1997 (age 29)	84	18	2019	(England) Coventry	Undisclosed	2023
14	Carlton Morris	(England)	CF	16 December 1995 (age 30)	22	7	2021	(England) Norwich City	Undisclosed	2023
25	George Miller	(England)	CF	11 August 1998 (age 28)	8	0	2019	(England) Middlesbrough	£200,000	2022
28	Dominik Frieser	(Austria)	RW/LW/CF	9 September 1993 (age 33)	43	3	2020	(Austria) LASK Linz	Undisclosed	2022
29	Victor Adeboyejo	(Nigeria) (England)	CF/RW	12 January 1998 (age 28)	65	6	2017	(England) Leyton Orient	Free	2022
Out on Loan
16	Luke Thomas	(England)	RW/AM	19 February 1999 (age 27)	64	2	2019	(England) Derby County	£1,220,000	2023
17	Marcel Ritzmaier	(Austria)	CM/LM/LB	22 April 1993 (age 33)	23	0	2020	(Austria) Wolfsberger AC	Undisclosed	2022
18	Isaac Christie-Davies	(Wales) (England)	AM/CM/LM	18 October 1997 (age 29)	0	0	2020	(England) Liverpool	Free	2023
19	Patrick Schmidt	(Austria)	CF/LW/RW	22 July 1998 (age 28)	39	4	2019	(Austria) Admira Wacker	£1,000,000	2023
23	Elliot Simões	(Angola) (Portugal)	LW/AM	20 December 1999 (age 26)	27	3	2019	(England) United of Manchester	Undisclosed	2023
33	Matty Wolfe	(England)	CM	12 June 2000 (age 26)	1	0	2020	Academy	Trainee	2022
	Jack Aitchison	(Scotland)	CF	5 March 2000 (age 26)	0	0	2020	(Scotland) Celtic	Free	2023

Appearances and goals correct as of 8 May 2021.

=== Statistics ===
As of 8 May 2021

No.	Pos	Nat	Player	Total		Championship		FA Cup		League Cup	
No.	Pos	Nat	Player	Apps	Goals	Apps	Goals	Apps	Goals	Apps	Goals
1	GK	(England) ENG	Jack Walton	25	0	24+0	0	0+0	0	1+0	0
2	DF	(England) ENG	Jordan Williams	24	1	7+13	0	0+1	0	3+0	1
4	MF	(England) ENG	Callum Styles	46	5	39+2	4	2+0	1	2+1	0
5	DF	(England) ENG	Liam Kitching	1	0	0+1	0	0+0	0	0+0	0
6	DF	(Denmark) DEN	Mads Juel Andersen	49	1	45+0	1	2+0	0	2+0	0
7	DF	(England) ENG	Callum Brittain	42	0	40+0	0	2+0	0	0+0	0
8	MF	(England) ENG	Herbie Kane	26	0	6+18	0	1+1	0	0+0	0
9	FW	(England) ENG	Cauley Woodrow	46	14	40+1	12	2+0	1	2+1	1
10	FW	(United States) USA	Daryl Dike	18	9	12+6	9	0+0	0	0+0	0
11	FW	(England) ENG	Conor Chaplin	37	4	30+3	4	1+1	0	1+1	0
14	FW	(England) ENG	Carlton Morris	22	7	6+16	7	0+0	0	0+0	0
20	DF	(England) ENG	Toby Sibbick	21	0	10+10	0	0+1	0	0+0	0
21	MF	(England) ENG	Romal Palmer	35	1	22+11	1	1+1	0	0+0	0
22	DF	(Kenya) KEN	Clarke Oduor	13	0	5+6	0	0+0	0	0+2	0
24	DF	(Finland) FIN	Aapo Halme	20	0	3+15	0	0+0	0	1+1	0
25	FW	(England) ENG	George Miller	6	0	0+5	0	0+1	0	0+0	0
26	DF	(Austria) AUT	Michael Sollbauer	42	0	34+3	0	1+1	0	3+0	0
27	MF	(England) ENG	Alex Mowatt	48	8	43+0	8	2+0	0	3+0	0
28	MF	(Austria) AUT	Dominik Frieser	47	3	26+16	3	2+0	0	2+1	0
29	FW	(England) ENG	Victor Adeboyejo	33	2	9+21	2	1+1	0	1+0	0
30	DF	(Poland) POL	Michał Helik	45	6	42+0	5	2+0	1	1+0	0
34	DF	(England) ENG	Jasper Moon	3	0	1+2	0	0+0	0	0+0	0
40	GK	(England) ENG	Bradley Collins	25	0	21+0	0	2+0	0	2+0	0
Players out on loan:
16	MF	(England) ENG	Luke Thomas	22	0	7+12	0	0+1	0	1+1	0
17	MF	(Austria) AUT	Marcel Ritzmaier	6	0	3+0	0	0+0	0	3+0	0
19	FW	(Austria) AUT	Patrick Schmidt	11	1	2+5	0	1+1	0	2+0	1
23	MF	(Angola) ANG	Elliot Simões	9	1	4+4	1	0+0	0	0+1	0
Players who have left the club:
14	DF	(Germany) GER	Kilian Ludewig	7	0	3+1	0	0+0	0	3+0	0
32	MF	(England) ENG	Matty James	15	0	13+2	0	0+0	0	0+0	0

==== Goals record ====
As of 8 May 2021

Rank	No.	Nat.	Po.	Name	Championship	FA Cup	League Cup	Total
1	9	(England)	CF	Cauley Woodrow	12	1	1	14
2	10	(United States)	CF	Daryl Dike	9	0	0	9
3	27	(England)	CM	Alex Mowatt	8	0	0	8
4	14	(England)	CF	Carlton Morris	7	0	0	7
4	30	(Poland)	CB	Michał Helik	5	1	0	6
6	4	(England)	AM	Callum Styles	4	1	0	5
7	11	(England)	CF	Conor Chaplin	4	0	0	4
8	28	(Austria)	RW	Dominik Frieser	3	0	0	3
9	29	(England)	CF	Victor Adeboyejo	2	0	0	2
10	2	(England)	RB	Jordan Williams	0	0	1	1
10	6	(Denmark)	CB	Mads Juel Andersen	1	0	0	1
10	19	(Austria)	CF	Patrick Schmidt	0	0	1	1
10	21	(England)	CM	Romal Palmer	1	0	0	1
10	23	(Angola)	LW	Elliot Simões	1	0	0	1
Total					1	0	0	1
Total					58	2	3	64

==== Disciplinary record ====
As of 8 May 2021

Rank	No.	Nat.	Po.	Name	Championship			FA Cup			League Cup			Total		
Rank	No.	Nat.	Po.	Name	Yellow card	(yellow card) (yellow-red card)	Red card	Yellow card	(yellow card) (yellow-red card)	Red card	Yellow card	(yellow card) (yellow-red card)	Red card	Yellow card	(yellow card) (yellow-red card)	Red card
1	6	(Denmark)	CB	Mads Juel Andersen	7	1	0	0	0	0	0	0	0	7	1	0
2	4	(England)	AM	Callum Styles	7	0	0	0	0	0	0	0	0	7	0	0
2	9	(England)	CF	Cauley Woodrow	7	0	0	0	0	0	0	0	0	7	0	0
2	27	(England)	CM	Alex Mowatt	6	0	1	0	0	0	0	0	0	6	0	1
2	30	(Poland)	CB	Michał Helik	6	0	1	0	0	0	0	0	0	6	0	1
6	24	(Finland)	CB	Aapo Halme	3	0	0	0	0	0	1	0	0	4	0	0
6	26	(Austria)	CB	Michael Sollbauer	4	0	0	0	0	0	0	0	0	4	0	0
8	7	(England)	RB	Callum Brittain	3	0	0	0	0	0	0	0	0	3	0	0
8	14	(England)	CF	Carlton Morris	3	0	0	0	0	0	0	0	0	3	0	0
8	20	(England)	RB	Toby Sibbick	3	0	0	0	0	0	0	0	0	3	0	0
11	10	(United States)	CF	Daryl Dike	2	0	0	0	0	0	0	0	0	2	0	0
11	11	(England)	CF	Conor Chaplin	2	0	0	0	0	0	0	0	0	2	0	0
11	21	(England)	CM	Romal Palmer	2	0	0	0	0	0	0	0	0	2	0	0
11	23	(Angola)	RW	Elliot Simões	1	0	0	0	0	0	1	0	0	2	0	0
11	32	(England)	CM	Matty James	2	0	0	0	0	0	0	0	0	2	0	0
11	40	(England)	GK	Bradley Collins	1	0	0	0	0	0	1	0	0	2	0	0
17	1	(England)	GK	Jack Walton	1	0	0	0	0	0	0	0	0	1	0	0
17	2	(England)	RB	Jordan Williams	0	0	0	0	0	0	1	0	0	1	0	0
17	8	(England)	CM	Herbie Kane	1	0	0	0	0	0	0	0	0	1	0	0
17	16	(England)	RW	Luke Thomas	1	0	0	0	0	0	0	0	0	1	0	0
17	17	(Austria)	CM	Marcel Ritzmaier	1	0	0	0	0	0	0	0	0	1	0	0
17	24	(Finland)	CB	Aapo Halme	1	0	0	0	0	0	0	0	0	1	0	0
Total					64	1	2	0	0	0	4	0	0	68	1	2

== Transfers ==
=== Transfers in ===
Date	Position	Nationality	Name	From	Fee	Ref.
20 August 2020	RW	(Austria)	Dominik Frieser	(Austria) LASK	Undisclosed	
7 September 2020	AM	(Wales)	Isaac Christie-Davies	(England) Liverpool	Free transfer	
9 September 2020	CB	(Poland)	Michał Helik	(Poland) KS Cracovia	Undisclosed	
10 September 2020	GK	(Ghana)	Corey Addai	(England) Coventry City	Free transfer	
17 September 2020	RM	(Scotland)	Daniel Bramall	(England) Buxton	Free transfer	
5 October 2020	CF	(Scotland)	Jack Aitchison	(Scotland) Celtic	Undisclosed	
10 October 2020	RB	(England)	Callum Brittain	(England) Milton Keynes Dons	Undisclosed	
16 October 2020	CM	(England)	Herbie Kane	(England) Liverpool	Undisclosed	
11 December 2020	CF	(England)	Cameron Thompson	(England) Fulham	Free transfer	
5 January 2021	CB	(England)	Liam Kitching	(England) Forest Green Rovers	Undisclosed	
6 January 2021	CF	(England)	Carlton Morris	(England) Norwich City	Undisclosed	

=== Loans in ===
Date from	Position	Nationality	Name	From	Date until	Ref.
17 August 2020	RB	(Germany)	Kilian Ludewig	(Austria) Red Bull Salzburg	6 October 2020	
16 October 2020	CM	(England)	Matty James	(England) Leicester City	1 January 2021	
1 February 2021	CF	(United States)	Daryl Dike	(United States) Orlando City	End of season	

=== Loans out ===
Date from	Position	Nationality	Name	To	Date until	Ref.
4 August 2020	RB	(England)	Toby Sibbick	(Belgium) KV Oostende	31 December 2020	
20 August 2020	RW	(England)	Jordan Green	(England) Southend United	8 October 2020	
5 October 2020	CM	(Austria)	Marcel Ritzmaier	(Austria) Rapid Wien	End of season	
6 October 2020	CF	(Scotland)	Jack Aitchison	(England) Stevenage	End of season	
6 October 2020	CB	(England)	Jordan Helliwell	(England) Stalybridge Celtic	5 November 2020	
15 October 2020	CM	(England)	Matty Wolfe	(England) Notts County	3 January 2021	
17 November 2020	GK	(England)	Corey Addai	(England) Chesterfield	7 December 2020	
6 January 2021	LW	(Angola)	Elliot Simões	(England) Doncaster Rovers	End of season	
18 January 2021	RM	(Scotland)	Daniel Bramall	(England) Barrow	End of season	
19 January 2021	RW	(England)	Luke Thomas	(England) Ipswich Town	End of season	
29 January 2021	AM	(Wales)	Isaac Christie-Davies	(Slovakia) Dunajská Streda	End of season	
6 February 2021	CF	(Austria)	Patrick Schmidt	(Austria) Ried	End of season	

=== Transfers out ===
Date from	Position	Nationality	Name	To	Fee	Ref.
1 July 2020	LB	(England)	Jordan Barnett	(England) Pontefract Collieries	Released	
1 July 2020	DM	(England)	Jared Bird	Unattached	Released	
1 July 2020	DM	(Australia)	Kenneth Dougall	(England) Blackpool	Released	
1 July 2020	CB	(England)	Sam Fielding	(England) Salford City	Released	
1 July 2020	CB	(England)	Harry Gagen	(England) Ossett United	Released	
1 July 2020	GK	(England)	Jake Greatorex	(England) Penistone Church	Released	
1 July 2020	RW	(England)	Josh Olatubosun	Unattached	Released	
1 July 2020	LB	(Spain)	Daniel Pinillos	(Poland) Miedź Legnica	Released	
1 July 2020	CF	(England)	Chris Sang	Unattached	Released	
1 July 2020	CF	(Senegal)	Mamadou Thiam	(Belgium) KV Oostende	Released	
1 July 2020	CF	(England)	Tommy Willard	(England) Aldershot Town	Released	
1 July 2020	CM	(England)	Alex Wollerton	(England) York City	Released	
1 July 2020	GK	(Austria)	Samuel Şahin-Radlinger	(Austria) SV Ried	Released	
2 July 2020	LW	(England)	Mallik Wilks	(England) Hull City	Undisclosed	
6 July 2020	GK	(Malta)	Miguel Spiteri	(Malta) Birkirkara	Free transfer	
9 July 2020	RB	(Malta)	Lee Ciantar	(Gibraltar) Europa Point	Free transfer	
7 August 2020	CM	(England)	Cameron McGeehan	(Belgium) KV Oostende	Undisclosed	
9 September 2020	RW	(England)	Jacob Brown	(England) Stoke City	Undisclosed	
7 October 2020	CB	(Spain)	Bambo Diaby	Unattached	Mutual consent	
23 November 2020	GK	(England)	Tom Wooster	(England) Manchester United	Undisclosed	
4 January 2021	RW	(England)	Jordan Green	(England) Dulwich Hamlet	Mutual consent	
22 January 2021	AM	(Germany)	Mike-Steven Bähre	(Germany) Meppen	Mutual consent	
2 February 2021	MF	(England)	Keaton Ward	(England) Mansfield Town	Mutual consent	

== Pre-season and friendlies ==
Win Draw Loss Fixtures

22 August 2020 Pre-season friendly	Crewe Alexandra	0–2	Barnsley	Crewe
15:00 BST		Report	M.Andersen; C.Chaplin	Stadium: The Alexandra Stadium

29 August 2020 Pre-season friendly	Newcastle United	2–1	Barnsley	Newcastle upon Tyne
15:00 BST	Carroll 27'; Murphy 77' (pen.)	Report	Ritzmaier 54'	Stadium: Darsley Park

== Competitions ==
=== Overview ===
Competition	First match	Last match	Starting round	Final position	Record							
Competition	First match	Last match	Starting round	Final position	Pld	W	D	L	GF	GA	GD	Win %
EFL Championship	12 September 2020	May 2021	Matchday 1	5th	44	23	8	13	56	46	+10	52.27
FA Cup	10 January 2021	11 February 2021	Third round	Fifth round	3	2	0	1	3	1	+2	66.67
EFL Cup	5 September 2020	23 September 2020	First round	Third round	3	2	0	1	3	6	−3	66.67
Total					50	27	8	15	62	53	+9	54.00

Last updated: 27 April 2021
Source: Competitions

=== EFL Championship ===
==== League table ====
Pos	Team	Pld	W	D	L	GF	GA	GD	Pts	Promotion, qualification or relegation
2	Watford (P)	46	27	10	9	63	30	+33	91	Promotion to the Premier League
3	Brentford (O, P)	46	24	15	7	79	42	+37	87	Qualification for Championship play-offs
4	Swansea City	46	23	11	12	56	39	+17	80	Qualification for Championship play-offs
5	Barnsley	46	23	9	14	58	50	+8	78	Qualification for Championship play-offs
6	Bournemouth	46	22	11	13	73	46	+27	77	Qualification for Championship play-offs
7	Reading	46	19	13	14	62	54	+8	70	
8	Cardiff City	46	18	14	14	66	49	+17	68	

Source: EFL Official Website
Rules for classification: 1) Points; 2) Goal difference; 3) Number of goals scored; 4) Head-to-head results; 5) Wins; 6) Away goals; 7) Penalty points (sec 9.5); 8) 12-point sending off offences
(O) Play-off winners; (P) Promoted

==== Results summary ====
Overall								Home						Away					
Pld	W	D	L	GF	GA	GD	Pts	W	D	L	GF	GA	GD	W	D	L	GF	GA	GD
46	23	9	14	58	50	+8	78	12	6	5	30	22	+8	11	3	9	28	28	0

Last updated: 8 May 2021.

==== Results by matchday ====
Matchday	1	2	3	4	5	6	7	8	9	10	11	12	13	14	15	16	17	18	19	20	21	22	23	24	25	26	27	28	29	30	31	32	33	34	35	36	37	38	39	40	41	42	43	44	45	46
Result	L	L	D	L	D	D	D	W	W	L	W	W	L	L	W	L	W	W	W	L	W	W	L	L	L	D	D	W	W	W	W	W	W	W	D	W	W	L	D	W	W	L	W	W	L	D
Position	15	20	20	22	22	21	21	18	15	18	16	13	14	16	14	17	16	13	12	13	10	8	9	10	11	12	12	12	10	10	8	7	7	6	6	6	5	5	5	5	5	6	6	6	6	5

Updated to match(es) played on 8 May 2021. Source:
A = Away; H = Home; W = Win; D = Draw; L = Loss

==== Matches ====
The 2020–21 season fixtures were released on 21 August.

12 September 2020 1	Barnsley	0–1	Luton Town	Barnsley
15:00 BST	Woodrow (yellow card) 7'	Report	Berry (yellow card) 31'; Collins (yellow card) 57' (goal) 71'; Ruddock (yellow card) 84'	Stadium: Oakwell; Attendance: 0 Referee: Jarred Gillett

19 September 2020 2	Reading	2–0	Barnsley	Reading
15:00 BST	Laurent (yellow card) 49'; Méïté 67'; Olise 76'	Report	Andersen (yellow card) 23' (yellow-red card) 68'; Helik (red card) 42'; Ritzmaier (yellow card) 45'; Mowatt (yellow card) 74'	Stadium: Madejski Stadium; Attendance: 0 Referee: Tim Robinson

26 September 2020 3	Barnsley	0–0	Coventry City	Barnsley
15:00 BST	Woodrow (yellow card) 45'; Styles (yellow card) 80'; Mowatt (yellow card) 85'	Report	Dabo (yellow card) 87'; Hamer (yellow card) 90+1'	Stadium: Oakwell; Attendance: 0 Referee: Josh Smith

3 October 2020 4	Middlesbrough	2–1	Barnsley	Middlesbrough
15:00 BST	Tavernier (yellow card) 9'; Morsy (yellow card) 27'; Howson 45+1' (yellow card) 52'; Akpom 48'; McNair (yellow card) 61'; Saville (yellow card) 68'; Bettinelli (yellow card) 90+1'	Report	Styles (yellow card) 49'; Woodrow 89' (pen.); Simões (yellow card) 90+2'	Stadium: Riverside Stadium; Attendance: 0 Referee: Oliver Langford

17 October 2020 5	Barnsley	2–2	Bristol City	Barnsley
15:00 BST	Helik 2' (yellow card) 88'; Andersen (yellow card) 81'; Woodrow 90+11' (pen.)	Report	Hunt 47'; Bakinson 51'	Stadium: Oakwell; Attendance: 0 Referee: Leigh Doughty

21 October 2020 6	Stoke City	2–2	Barnsley	Stoke-on-Trent
19:45 BST	Campbell 44'; Smith 48'; Collins (red card) 60'	Report	Simões 18'; Frieser 45+1'	Stadium: Bet365 Stadium; Attendance: 0 Referee: Michael Salisbury

24 October 2020 7	Millwall	1–1	Barnsley	Bermondsey
15:00 BST	Cooper 45+1'	Report	Helik (yellow card) 17'; Mowatt 44'; Brittain (yellow card) 51'	Stadium: The Den; Attendance: 0 Referee: Andy Davies

27 October 2020 8	Barnsley	3–0	Queens Park Rangers	Barnsley
19:00 GMT	Woodrow 27' (pen.); Chaplin 37'; Barbet 64' (o.g.)	Report	Dickie (red card) 26'	Stadium: Oakwell; Attendance: 0 Referee: Andy Davies

31 October 2020 9	Barnsley	1–0	Watford	Barnsley
15:00 GMT	Mowatt 6'; Styles (yellow card) 82'	Report	Troost-Ekong (yellow card) 3'	Stadium: Oakwell; Attendance: 0 Referee: Matt Donohue

3 November 2020 10	Cardiff City	3–0	Barnsley	Cardiff
19:45 GMT	Hoilett 4'; Ralls 45+1' (pen.); Wilson 77'	Report	James (yellow card) 39'	Stadium: Cardiff City Stadium; Attendance: 0 Referee: Dean Whitestone

7 November 2020 11	Derby County	0–2	Barnsley	Derby
15:00 GMT	Byrne (yellow card) 45'; Jóźwiak (yellow card) 53'; Sibley (yellow card) 90'	Report	Chaplin 30'; Andersen (yellow card) 59'; Sollbauer (yellow card) 61'; Adeboyejo 83'	Stadium: Pride Park Stadium; Attendance: 0 Referee: Leigh Doughty

21 November 2020 12	Barnsley	2–0	Nottingham Forest	Barnsley
15:00 GMT	Styles 86'; Woodrow 88'	Report	Samba (yellow card) 86'	Stadium: Oakwell; Attendance: 0 Referee: Andy Woolmer

24 November 2020 13	Barnsley	0–1	Brentford	Barnsley
19:45 GMT	Chaplin (yellow card) 40'	Report	Toney 66'	Stadium: Oakwell; Attendance: 0 Referee: Darren Bond

28 November 2020 14	Blackburn Rovers	2–1	Barnsley	Blackburn
15:00 GMT	Armstrong 44' (yellow card) 69'; Gallagher 78'; Rothwell (yellow card) 90+6'	Report	Palmer 90'	Stadium: Ewood Park; Attendance: 0 Referee: Andrew Madley

1 December 2020 15	Birmingham City	1–2	Barnsley	Bordesley
19:45 GMT	Hogan 56'; McGree (yellow card) 68'; Leko (yellow card) 77'	Report	Andersen (yellow card) 58'; Woodrow 71' (pen.); Styles 84'	Stadium: St Andrew's Stadium; Attendance: 0 Referee: Tony Harrington

4 December 2020 16	Barnsley	0–4	Bournemouth	Barnsley
17:30 GMT	Woodrow (yellow card) 32'; Andersen (yellow card) 76'; Sollbauer (yellow card) 85'	Report	Billing 12'; Solanke 45+2'; Rico 52'; Surridge 68'	Stadium: Oakwell Stadium; Attendance: 0 Referee: Keith Stroud

9 December 2020 17	Barnsley	2–1	Wycombe Wanderers	Barnsley
19:45 GMT	Styles 31' (yellow card) 89'; Woodrow 61' (pen.); Mowatt (yellow card) 73'; Brittain (yellow card) 77'	Report	Jacobson 49' (pen.) (yellow card) 81'; Allsop (yellow card) 60'; Grimmer (yellow card) 73'	Stadium: Oakwell; Referee: Geoff Eltringham

12 December 2020 18	Sheffield Wednesday	1–2	Barnsley	Owlerton, Sheffield
15:00 BST	Windass 4'; Bannan (yellow card) 31'	Report	Woodrow 14'; Frieser 37'	Stadium: Hillsborough; Attendance: 0 Referee: James Linington

15 December 2020 19	Barnsley	2–1	Preston North End	Barnsley
19:45 GMT	Mowatt 54'; Adeboyejo 80'; Styles (yellow card) 84'; Thomas (yellow card) 90'	Report	Maguire 2'; Browne (yellow card) 63'; Johnson (yellow card) 71'	Stadium: Oakwell Stadium; Attendance: 0 Referee: Dean Whitestone

19 December 2020 20	Swansea City	2–0	Barnsley	Swansea
15:00 GMT	Lowe 2'; Adeboyejo 66' (o.g.); Roberts (yellow card) 90+4'	Report	Walton (yellow card) 29'	Stadium: The Liberty Stadium; Attendance: 0 Referee: Andy Davies

26 December 2020 21	Barnsley	2–1	Huddersfield Town	Barnsley
15:00 GMT	Helik 21', 90+4' (yellow card) 30'	Report	Edmonds-Green 13'	Stadium: Oakwell Stadium; Attendance: 0 Referee: David Webb

29 December 2020 22	Rotherham United	1–2	Barnsley	Rotherham
19:45 GMT	Smith 57' (yellow card) 81'; Lindsay (yellow card) 69'; Wood (yellow card) 77'	Report	Woodrow 8'; Mowatt 15'; Sollbauer (yellow card) 56'	Stadium: New York Stadium; Attendance: 0 Referee: Steve Martin

2 January 2021 23	Norwich City	1–0	Barnsley	Norwich
15:00 GMT	Buendía 62'	Report	James (yellow card) 61'	Stadium: Carrow Road; Attendance: 0 Referee: Michael Salisbury

16 January 2021 24	Barnsley	0–2	Swansea City	Barnsley
19:45 GMT	Andersen (yellow card) 82'	Report	Cabango 45+1'; Lowe 55', (yellow card) 90+4'	Stadium: Oakwell Stadium; Attendance: 0 Referee: Jeremy Simpson

19 January 2021 25	Watford	1–0	Barnsley	Watford
19:45 GMT	Deeney 27' (pen.); Sarr (yellow card) 90+3'	Report	Sollbauer (yellow card) 90'	Stadium: Vicarage Road; Attendance: 0 Referee: Tim Robinson

27 January 2021 26	Barnsley	2–2	Cardiff City	Barnsley
19:00 GMT	Andersen 20'; Woodrow 52'	Report	Ojo 58'; Moore 68'	Stadium: Oakwell Stadium; Attendance: 0 Referee: Andy Woolmer

30 January 2021 27	Nottingham Forest	0–0	Barnsley	West Bridgford
15:00 GMT	Bong (yellow card) 35'	Report	Kane (yellow card) 56'; Helik (yellow card) 60'	Stadium: The City Ground; Attendance: 0 Referee: Leigh Doughty

14 February 2021 28	Brentford	0–2	Barnsley	Brentford
13:00 GMT	Toney (yellow card) 90+6'	Report	Chaplin 13'; Sollbauer (yellow card) 26'; Dike (yellow card) 43'; Morris 47'; Woodrow (yellow card) 83'; Mowatt (yellow card) 90+1' Valérien Ismaël (yellow card)	Stadium: Brentford Community Stadium; Attendance: 0 Referee: David Coote

17 February 2021 29	Barnsley	2–1	Blackburn Rovers	Barnsley
19:45 GMT	Andersen (yellow card) 53'; Morris 72'; Mowatt 90'	Report	Harwood-Bellis (yellow card) 83'; Armstrong 90+4'	Stadium: Oakwell Stadium; Attendance: 0 Referee: Matt Donohue

20 February 2021 30	Bristol City	0–1	Barnsley	Bristol
15:00 GMT	Hunt (yellow card) 4'	Report	Morris 67'; Mowatt (yellow card) 79'; Collins (yellow card) 90+3'	Stadium: Ashton Gate; Attendance: 0 Referee: James Linington

24 February 2021 31	Barnsley	2–0	Stoke City	Barnsley
19:00 GMT	Styles 9'; Dike 90'	Report	Batth (yellow card) 8'; Mikel (yellow card) 76'; Powell (yellow card) 90+2'	Stadium: Oakwell Stadium; Attendance: 0 Referee: Darren Bond

27 February 2021 32	Barnsley	2–1	Millwall	Barnsley
15:00 GMT	Woodrow 2', (yellow card) 89'; Helik 59'	Report	Bennett 6'; Woods (yellow card) 46'	Stadium: Oakwell Stadium; Attendance: 0 Referee: Leigh Doughty

3 March 2021 33	Queens Park Rangers	1–3	Barnsley	Shepherd's Bush
19:00 GMT	Austin 27'; Dickie (yellow card) 89'	Report	Dike 23'; Mowatt 29'; Morris 57'	Stadium: Kiyan Prince Foundation Stadium; Attendance: 0 Referee: Andy Woolmer

6 March 2021 34	Barnsley	1–0	Birmingham City	Barnsley
15:00 GMT	Dike 49'; Halme (yellow card) 77'; Brittain (yellow card) 90+5'	Report	Friend (yellow card) 33'; Harper (yellow card) 72'	Stadium: Oakwell; Attendance: 0 Referee: Graham Scott

10 March 2021 35	Barnsley	0–0	Derby County	Barnsley
19:00 GMT	Woodrow (yellow card) 9'; Dike (yellow card) 87'	Report		Stadium: Oakwell Stadium; Attendance: 0 Referee: Keith Stroud

13 March 2021 36	Bournemouth	2–3	Barnsley	King's Park
15:00 GMT	Danjuma 22'; Solanke 45+1'; Surridge (yellow card) 78'; Kelly (yellow card) 86'	Report	Helik 16'; Woodrow (yellow card) 24'; Andersen (yellow card) 43'; Frieser 60'; Morris (yellow card) 75', (goal) 80'	Stadium: Vitality Stadium; Attendance: 0 Referee: John Brooks

17 March 2021 37	Wycombe Wanderers	1–3	Barnsley	High Wycombe
19:45 GMT	Ikpeazu 85'; Knight (yellow card) 90'; Jacobson (yellow card) 90'	Report	Woodrow 45+2' (pen.); Dike 49', 81'; Styles (yellow card) 59'; Mowatt (red card) 73'; Morris (yellow card) 77'; Sibbick (yellow card) 90'	Stadium: Adams Park; Attendance: 0 Referee: Darren Bond

20 March 2021 38	Barnsley	1–2	Sheffield Wednesday	Barnsley
15:00 GMT	Halme (yellow card) 71'; Morris 78'	Report	Lees (yellow card) 25'; Börner (yellow card) 36'; Rhodes 38', 53'; Paterson (yellow card) 87'; Wildsmith (yellow card) 88'	Stadium: Oakwell Stadium; Attendance: 0 Referee: Tim Robinson

2 April 2021 39	Barnsley	1–1	Reading	Barnsley
17:30 BST	Woodrow (yellow card) 18'; Palmer (yellow card) 25'; Mowatt 61' (pen.); Halme (yellow card) 68'	Report	Ejaria 34'	Stadium: Oakwell Stadium; Attendance: 0 Referee: Geoff Eltringham

5 April 2021 40	Luton Town	1–2	Barnsley	Luton
15:00 BST	Bradley (yellow card) 54'; Collins 83'	Report	Dike 27', 59' (penalty missed) 83'	Stadium: Kenilworth Road; Attendance: 0 Referee: Matt Donohue

10 April 2021 41	Barnsley	2–0	Middlesbrough	Barnsley
15:00 BST	Mowatt (yellow card) 31', (goal) 62'; Dike 75'	Report		Stadium: Oakwell Stadium; Attendance: 0 Referee: Keith Stroud

18 April 2021 42	Coventry City	2–0	Barnsley	Bordesley
15:00 BST	Hyam 9'; Godden 90+2'	Report	Styles (yellow card) 85'	Stadium: St Andrew's Stadium; Attendance: 0 Referee: Lee Mason

21 April 2021 43	Huddersfield Town	0–1	Barnsley	Huddersfield
19:45 BST	Hogg (yellow card) 21'	Report	Andersen (yellow card) 59'; Dike 65'; Morris (yellow card) 85'	Stadium: The John Smith's Stadium; Attendance: 0 Referee: David Webb

24 April 2021 44	Barnsley	1–0	Rotherham United	Barnsley
15:00 BST	Morris 2'; Sibbick (yellow card) 65'; Halme (yellow card) 85'	Report	S. MacDonald (yellow card) 28'; Wood (yellow card) 45+1'; A. MacDonald (yellow card) 54'	Stadium: Oakwell Stadium; Attendance: 0 Referee: Gavin Ward

1 May 2021 45	Preston North End	2–0	Barnsley	Preston
15:00 BST	Storey 38'; Evans 49'; Whiteman (yellow card) 58'	Report	Helik (yellow card) 45+1'; Dike (yellow card) 72'	Stadium: Deepdale; Attendance: 0 Referee: Matt Donohue

8 May 2021 46	Barnsley	2–2	Norwich City	Barnsley
12:30 BST	Chaplin (yellow card) 17', (goal) 43'; Woodrow 24'; Palmer (yellow card) 63'; Sibbick (yellow card) 66'	Report	Buendía 26', (yellow card) 90'; Idah 54'	Stadium: Oakwell Stadium; Attendance: 0 Referee: Josh Smith

==== Play-offs ====
17 May 2021 Semi-final first leg	Barnsley	0–1	Swansea City	Barnsley
20:15 BST		Report	Ayew 39', (yellow card) 52'	Stadium: Oakwell Stadium; Referee: Geoff Eltringham

22 May 2021 Semi-final second leg	Swansea City	1–1 (2–1 agg.)	Barnsley	Swansea
18:30 BST	Grimes 39'; Fulton (yellow card) 90+6'	Report	Woodrow 71'	Stadium: Liberty Stadium; Attendance: 3,000; Referee: John Brooks

=== FA Cup ===
The third round draw was made on 30 November, with Premier League and EFL Championship clubs all entering the competition. The draw for the fourth and fifth round were made on 11 January, conducted by Peter Crouch.

10 January 2021 Third round	Barnsley	2–0	Tranmere Rovers	Barnsley
13:30 GMT	Helik 59'; Woodrow 90+5' (pen.)	Report		Stadium: Oakwell Stadium; Attendance: 0 Referee: Oliver Langford

23 January 2021 Fourth round	Barnsley	1–0	Norwich City	Barnsley
15:00 GMT	Styles 56'	Report		Stadium: Oakwell Stadium; Attendance: 0 Referee: John Brooks

11 February 2021 Fifth round	Barnsley	0–1	Chelsea	Barnsley
20:00 GMT		Report	Abraham 64'	Stadium: Oakwell Stadium; Attendance: 0 Referee: Martin Atkinson

=== EFL Cup ===
The first round draw was made on 18 August, live on Sky Sports, by Paul Merson. The draw for both the second and third round were confirmed on September 6, live on Sky Sports by Phil Babb.

5 September 2020 First round	Barnsley	1–0	Nottingham Forest	Barnsley
15:00 BST	Williams (yellow card) 31'; Woodrow 49'; Simões (yellow card) 66'	Report		Stadium: Oakwell; Attendance: 0 Referee: Marc Edwards

15 September 2020 Second round	Middlesbrough	0–2	Barnsley	Middlesbrough
18:00 BST	Morsy (yellow card) 67'; Wood-Gordon (yellow card) 84'	Report	Schmidt 22'; Williams 34'; Halme (yellow card) 81'	Stadium: Riverside Stadium; Attendance: 0 Referee: Anthony Backhouse

23 September 2020 Third round	Chelsea	6–0	Barnsley	Fulham
19:45 BST	Abraham 19'; Havertz 28', 55', 65'; Barkley 49'; Giroud 83'	Report	Collins (yellow card) 45'	Stadium: Stamford Bridge; Attendance: 0 Referee: Darren Bond
