= 2019–20 Barnsley F.C. season =

Barnsley
2019–20 season
- Owner: International Investment Consortium (80%); James Cryne/The Cryne Family (20%)
- Chairman: Chien Lee (co-chairman); Paul Conway (co-chairman)
- Head coach: Daniel Stendel (until 8 October); Adam Murray (caretaker, 8 October – 20 November); Gerhard Struber (from 20 November)
- Stadium: Oakwell
- Championship: 21st
- FA Cup: Fourth round
- EFL Cup: First round
- Top goalscorer: League: Cauley Woodrow (14); All: Cauley Woodrow (15)
Home colours	Away colours	Third colours

The 2019–20 season was Barnsley's first season back in the EFL Championship since 2017–18. Aside of the Championship, they participated in the FA Cup and the EFL Cup. The season covered the period from 1 July 2019 to 20 July 2020.

== Squad ==
As of 18 June 2019

No.	Name	Pos.	Nat.	Place of Birth	Age	Apps	Goals	Signed from	Date signed	Fee	Contract End
Goalkeepers
1	Samuel Şahin-Radlinger	GK	(Austria)	Ried	27	17	0	Hannover 96	1 July 2019	Undisclosed	2020
13	Jack Walton	GK	(England)	Bury	22	18	0	Academy	1 July 2015	Trainee	2021
40	Bradley Collins	GK	(England)	Southampton	23	23	0	Chelsea	1 July 2019	Free	2023
Defenders
2	Jordan Williams	RB	(England)	Huddersfield	20	49	1	Huddersfield Town	8 August 2018	Undisclosed	2022
3	Ben Williams	LB	(Wales)		21	36	0	Blackburn Rovers	1 July 2017	Free	2022
5	Bambo Diaby	CB	(Senegal)		22	21	1	Lokeren	5 July 2019	Undisclosed	2023
6	Mads Juel Andersen	CB	(Denmark)	Albertslund	22	40	0	AC Horsens	1 July 2019	Undisclosed	2023
14	Kilian Ludewig	RB	(Germany)		20	19	0	FC Red Bull Salzburg	9 January 2020	Loan	2020
18	Michael Sollbauer	CB	(Austria)	Klein Sankt Paul	30	19	0	Wolfsberger AC	24 January 2020	Undisclosed	2022
21	Toby Sibbick	RB	(England)	Isleworth	21	18	0	AFC Wimbledon	2 July 2019	Undisclosed	2023
22	Clarke Oduor	LB/LM	(Kenya)	Siaya	21	19	1	Leeds United	8 August 2019	Undisclosed	2023
23	Daniel Pinillos	LB	(Spain)	Logroño	27	52	0	Córdoba	19 January 2018	Undisclosed	2020
24	Aapo Halme	CB	(Finland)	Helsinki	22	35	4	Leeds United	3 July 2019	Undisclosed	2022
Midfielders
4	Kenneth Dougall	DM	(Australia)	Brisbane	27	42	0	Sparta Rotterdam	27 July 2018	Undisclosed	2020
10	Mike-Steven Bähre	AM	(Germany)	Garbsen	24	69	3	Hannover 96	1 July 2019	Undisclosed	2022
14	Jared Bird	CM	(England)	Nottingham	22	8	0	Academy	1 July 2017	Trainee	2020
16	Luke Thomas	RW	(England)	Soudley	21	42	2	Derby County	1 July 2019	Undisclosed	2023
17	Marcel Ritzmaier	CM	(Austria)	Judenburg	27	17	0	Wolfsberger AC	6 January 2020	Undisclosed	2022
20	Callum Styles	AM	(England)	Bury	20	25	1	Bury	6 August 2018	Undisclosed	2022
27	Alex Mowatt	CM	(England)	Doncaster	25	110	12	Leeds United	31 January 2017	£600,000	2021
28	Elliot Simões	LW	(Portugal)		29	18	2	United of Manchester	21 January 2019	Undisclosed	2023
Forwards
7	Jacob Brown	ST	(England)	Halifax	21	82	12	Academy	1 July 2016	Trainee	2022
9	Cauley Woodrow	CF	(England)	Hemel Hempstead	25	77	34	Fulham	3 January 2019	Undisclosed	2022
11	Conor Chaplin	CF	(England)	Woking	23	47	14	Coventry City	19 July 2019	Undisclosed	2023
15	Jordan Green	RW/CF	(England)	New Cross	25	12	1	Yeovil Town	18 January 2018	Undisclosed	2021
19	Patrick Schmidt	CF	(Austria)	Eisenstadt	21	28	3	Admira Wacker	8 August 2019	Undisclosed	2023
25	George Miller	CF	(England)	Bolton	21	2	0	Middlesbrough	31 January 2019	£200,000	2022
26	Mamadou Thiam	ST	(Senegal)	Aubervilliers	25	92	8	Dijon	11 August 2017	£900,000	2020
29	Victor Adeboyejo	ST	(Nigeria)	Ibadan	22	31	4	Leyton Orient	4 November 2017	Free	2021
Out on Loan
8	Cameron McGeehan	CM	(England)	Kingston upon Thames	25	67	9	Luton Town	23 June 2017	£990,000	2021

Appearances and goals correct as of 22 July 2020.

=== Statistics ===
==== Appearances & goals ====
As of 22 July 2020

No.	Pos	Nat	Player	Total		Championship		FA Cup		League Cup	
No.	Pos	Nat	Player	Apps	Goals	Apps	Goals	Apps	Goals	Apps	Goals
1	GK	(Austria) AUT	Samuel Şahin-Radlinger	17	0	17+0	0	0+0	0	0+0	0
2	DF	(England) ENG	Jordan Williams	34	0	30+1	0	2+0	0	1+0	0
3	DF	(Wales) WAL	Ben Williams	21	0	15+5	0	0+1	0	0+0	0
4	MF	(Australia) AUS	Kenneth Dougall	14	0	9+3	0	1+1	0	0+0	0
5	DF	(Senegal) SEN	Bambo Diaby	21	1	20+0	1	1+0	0	0+0	0
6	DF	(Denmark) DEN	Mads Juel Andersen	40	0	36+1	0	2+0	0	1+0	0
7	FW	(England) ENG	Jacob Brown	41	4	38+1	3	2+0	1	0+0	0
9	FW	(England) ENG	Cauley Woodrow	42	15	37+3	14	1+0	1	1+0	0
10	MF	(Germany) GER	Mike-Steven Bähre	27	1	20+6	1	0+0	0	0+1	0
11	FW	(England) ENG	Conor Chaplin	47	14	36+8	12	2+0	2	1+0	0
13	GK	(England) ENG	Jack Walton	9	0	9+0	0	0+0	0	0+0	0
14	DF	(Germany) GER	Kilian Ludewig	19	0	13+6	0	0+0	0	0+0	0
15	FW	(England) ENG	Jordan Green	2	0	0+2	0	0+0	0	0+0	0
16	MF	(England) ENG	Luke Thomas	41	2	23+15	1	2+0	1	0+1	0
17	MF	(Austria) AUT	Marcel Ritzmaier	17	0	13+3	0	1+0	0	0+0	0
18	DF	(Austria) AUT	Michael Sollbauer	19	0	18+0	0	1+0	0	0+0	0
19	FW	(Austria) AUT	Patrick Schmidt	28	3	2+25	3	0+1	0	0+0	0
20	MF	(England) ENG	Callum Styles	18	1	5+12	1	0+0	0	1+0	0
21	DF	(England) ENG	Toby Sibbick	18	0	17+1	0	0+0	0	0+0	0
22	DF	(Kenya) KEN	Clarke Oduor	18	1	12+4	1	2+0	0	0+0	0
23	DF	(Spain) ESP	Daniel Pinillos	5	0	2+2	0	0+0	0	1+0	0
24	DF	(Finland) FIN	Aapo Halme	35	4	27+6	4	1+0	0	1+0	0
25	FW	(England) ENG	George Miller	2	0	0+1	0	0+0	0	0+1	0
26	FW	(Senegal) SEN	Mamadou Thiam	9	0	3+5	0	0+0	0	1+0	0
27	MF	(England) ENG	Alex Mowatt	45	2	43+0	2	1+1	0	0+0	0
28	FW	(Portugal) POR	Elliot Simões	18	2	6+11	2	1+0	0	0+0	0
33	MF	(England) ENG	Matty Wolfe	1	0	0+1	0	0+0	0	0+0	0
40	GK	(England) ENG	Bradley Collins	23	0	20+0	0	2+0	0	1+0	0
41	MF	(England) ENG	Romal Palmer	3	0	3+0	0	0+0	0	0+0	0
Players out on loan:
8	MF	(England) ENG	Cameron McGeehan	13	2	10+2	2	0+0	0	1+0	0
Players who left the club:
12	DF	(Guadeloupe) GLP	Dimitri Cavaré	10	0	10+0	0	0+0	0	0+0	0
36	FW	(England) ENG	Mallik Wilks	16	1	8+7	1	0+0	0	1+0	0

==== Disciplinary record ====
As of 22 July 2020

Rank	No.	Nat.	Po.	Name	Championship			FA Cup			League Cup			Total		
Rank	No.	Nat.	Po.	Name	Booked	(yellow card) (yellow-red card)	Sent off (straight red)	Booked	(yellow card) (yellow-red card)	Sent off (straight red)	Booked	(yellow card) (yellow-red card)	Sent off (straight red)	Booked	(yellow card) (yellow-red card)	Sent off (straight red)
1	6	(Denmark)	CB	Mads Juel Andersen	9	0	0	0	0	0	1	0	0	10	0	0
1	24	(Finland)	CB	Aapo Halme	10	0	0	0	0	0	0	0	0	10	0	0
3	5	(Senegal)	CB	Bambo Diaby	8	0	0	1	0	0	0	0	0	9	0	0
4	27	(England)	CM	Alex Mowatt	8	0	0	0	0	0	0	0	0	8	0	0
5	2	(England)	RB	Jordan Williams	5	0	0	1	0	0	0	0	0	6	0	0
6	9	(England)	CF	Cauley Woodrow	5	0	0	0	0	0	0	0	0	5	0	0
6	11	(England)	CF	Conor Chaplin	5	0	0	0	0	0	0	0	0	5	0	0
6	16	(England)	RW	Luke Thomas	5	0	0	0	0	0	0	0	0	5	0	0
6	18	(Austria)	CB	Michael Sollbauer	5	0	0	0	0	0	0	0	0	5	0	0
6	~~36~~	(England)	LW	Mallik Wilks	5	0	0	0	0	0	0	0	0	5	0	0
11	3	(Wales)	LB	Ben Williams	3	0	1	0	0	0	0	0	0	3	0	1
11	7	(England)	RW	Jacob Brown	4	0	0	0	0	0	0	0	0	4	0	0
11	8	(England)	CM	Cameron McGeehan	4	0	0	0	0	0	0	0	0	4	0	0
11	10	(Germany)	AM	Mike-Steven Bähre	3	0	0	0	0	0	1	0	0	4	0	0
15	4	(Australia)	DM	Kenneth Dougall	3	0	0	0	0	0	0	0	0	3	0	0
15	12	(Guadeloupe)	RB	Dimitri Cavaré	3	0	0	0	0	0	0	0	0	3	0	0
15	21	(England)	RB	Toby Sibbick	3	0	0	0	0	0	0	0	0	3	0	0
18	20	(England)	AM	Callum Styles	1	0	0	0	0	0	1	0	0	2	0	0
18	28	(Portugal)	LW	Elliot Simões	2	0	0	0	0	0	0	0	0	2	0	0
20	40	(England)	GK	Bradley Collins	1	0	0	0	0	0	0	0	0	1	0	0
Total					92	0	1	2	0	0	3	0	0	97	0	1

== Pre-season ==
The Reds have announced pre-season friendlies against Stalybridge Celtic, Toulon, VfL Bochum, Arminia Bielefeld and Sheffield United.

3 July 2019 Friendly	Stalybridge Celtic	0–5	Barnsley	Stalybridge
19:45 BST		Report	Mowatt 18'; Woodrow 20', 40'; Green 45'; Styles 71'	Stadium: Bower Fold

9 July 2019 Friendly	Toulon	2–4	Barnsley	Toulon, France
19:00 CEST		Report	Woodrow 2', 27', 45+1'; Bähre 37'	Stadium: Stade de Bon Rencontre

17 July 2019 Friendly	VfL Bochum	1–2	Barnsley	Bochum, Germany
19:00 CEST	Weilandt 88'	Report	Woodrow 35'; Miller 86'	Stadium: Vonovia Ruhrstadion

20 July 2019 Friendly	Arminia Bielefeld	2–3	Barnsley	Bielefeld, Germany
15:30 CEST	Klos 9'; Voglsammer 77'	Report	Wilks 23'; Woodrow 28'; Thomas 66'	Stadium: SchücoArena

27 July 2019 Friendly	Barnsley	1–4	Sheffield United	Barnsley
12:00 BST	McGeehan 54'	Report	Osborn 20'; Robinson 57', 74'; Freeman 89'	Stadium: Oakwell

== Competitions ==
=== Championship ===
==== League table ====
Pos	Team	Pld	W	D	L	GF	GA	GD	Pts	Promotion, qualification or relegation
18	Huddersfield Town	46	13	12	21	52	70	−18	51	
19	Luton Town	46	14	9	23	54	82	−28	51	
20	Birmingham City	46	12	14	20	54	75	−21	50	
21	Barnsley	46	12	13	21	49	69	−20	49	
22	Charlton Athletic (R)	46	12	12	22	50	65	−15	48	Relegation to EFL League One
23	Wigan Athletic (R)	46	15	14	17	57	56	+1	47 (Note: As a result of Wigan Athletic entering administration, the club was subject to a 12-point deduction. In accordance with EFL regulations, the timing of the sporting sanction was only determined once final league placings in the Championship were determined. Since the club did not finish in the relegation places at the end of season, the sanction was applied to their 2019–20 total and final league standings were amended as appropriate.)	Relegation to EFL League One
24	Hull City (R)	46	12	9	25	57	87	−30	45	Relegation to EFL League One

Source: EFL Official Website
Rules for classification: 1) Points; 2) Goal difference; 3) Number of goals scored; 4) Head-to-head results; 5) Wins; 6) Away goals; 7) Penalty points (sec 9.5); 8) 12-point sending off offences
(R) Relegated

==== Result summary ====
Overall								Home						Away					
Pld	W	D	L	GF	GA	GD	Pts	W	D	L	GF	GA	GD	W	D	L	GF	GA	GD
46	12	13	21	49	69	−20	49	7	9	7	29	33	−4	5	4	14	20	36	−16

Last updated: 22 July 2020.
Source: Statto.com

==== Results by matchday ====
Matchday	1	2	3	4	5	6	7	8	9	10	11	12	13	14	15	16	17	18	19	20	21	22	23	24	25	26	27	28	29	30	31	32	33	34	35	36	37	38	39	40	41	42	43	44	45	46
Ground	H	A	H	A	H	A	H	A	H	H	A	H	A	A	H	H	A	A	H	A	H	H	A	H	A	A	H	A	H	A	H	H	A	H	A	A	H	A	H	H	A	A	H	A	H	A
Result	W	L	D	L	L	D	L	L	L	D	L	D	D	L	D	L	L	L	W	L	D	W	W	D	D	L	W	L	L	L	D	L	W	W	W	L	L	W	D	W	L	D	D	L	W	W
Position	7	15	14	17	21	21	22	22	22	22	23	24	24	24	23	24	24	24	24	24	24	24	22	23	22	23	22	22	22	23	23	24	24	23	23	23	24	23	24	23	23	23	24	24	23	21

Updated to match(es) played on 22 July 2020. Source: Statto.com
A = Away; H = Home; W = Win; D = Draw; L = Loss

==== Matches ====
On Thursday, 20 June 2019, the EFL Championship fixtures were revealed.

3 August 2019 1	Barnsley	1–0	Fulham	Barnsley
15:00 BST	Thomas 13'; Mowatt (yellow card) 44'; Diaby (yellow card) 54'; Wilks (yellow card) 90+4'	Report	Le Marchand (yellow card) 32'	Stadium: Oakwell; Attendance: 14,823; Referee: Andy Davies

10 August 2019 2	Sheffield Wednesday	2–0	Barnsley	Owlerton
15:00 BST	Murphy 2'; Börner (yellow card) 50'; Fletcher 60'	Report	McGeehan (yellow card) 90'	Stadium: Hillsborough; Attendance: 28,028; Referee: Tony Harrington

17 August 2019 3	Barnsley	2–2	Charlton Athletic	Barnsley
15:00 BST	Woodrow 34' (yellow card) 69'; Chaplin 48'; Wilks (yellow card) 53'; Thomas (yellow card) 61'; Diaby (yellow card) 90+5'	Report	Oshilaja (yellow card) 27'; Gallagher 40'; Taylor 89' (pen.); Aneke (yellow card) 90+3'; Cullen (yellow card) 90+4'	Stadium: Oakwell; Attendance: 13,006; Referee: Matt Donohue

20 August 2019 4	Birmingham City	2–0	Barnsley	Bordesley
19:45 BST	Jutkiewicz 69'; Giménez (yellow card) 71' (goal) 77'	Report	Andersen (yellow card) 40'	Stadium: St. Andrew's Trillion Trophy Stadium; Attendance: 20,061; Referee: Geoff Eltringham

24 August 2019 5	Barnsley	1–3	Luton Town	Barnsley
15:00 BST	Diaby (yellow card) 41'; Bähre (yellow card) 56'; Wilks 72' (yellow card) 77'	Report	Butterfield 2'; Collins 5'; Cornick 31'; LuaLua (yellow card) 44'	Stadium: Oakwell; Attendance: 13,250; Referee: Stephen Martin

31 August 2019 6	Wigan Athletic	0–0	Barnsley	Wigan
15:00 BST	Williams (yellow card) 57'	Report	Halme (yellow card) 10'; Andersen (yellow card) 39'; Wilks (yellow card) 47'; Williams (yellow card) 85' (yellow-red card) 90+1'; Cavaré (yellow card) 90+6'	Stadium: DW Stadium; Attendance: 23,792; Referee: Andy Woolmer

15 September 2019 8	Barnsley	0–2	Leeds United	Barnsley
12:30 BST	Sibbick (yellow card) 38'	Report	Nketiah 84'; Klich 89' (pen.)	Stadium: Oakwell; Referee: Keith Stroud

21 September 2019 8	Nottingham Forest	1–0	Barnsley	West Bridgford
15:00 BST	Cash (yellow card) 24'; Watson 56'; Samba (yellow card) 90+1'	Report	Williams (yellow card) 29'; Halme (yellow card) 52'; Chaplin (yellow card) 90+1'	Stadium: The City Ground; Attendance: 29,202; Referee: Jarred Gillett

29 September 2019 9	Barnsley	1–3	Brentford	Barnsley
13:30 BST	Woodrow 1'	Report	Watkins 35', 46', 68'	Stadium: Oakwell; Attendance: 12,188; Referee: David Webb
Note: Live on Sky Sports

2 October 2019 10	Barnsley	2–2	Derby County	Barnsley
19:45 BST	Halme 13'; Sibbick (yellow card) 74'; Thomas (yellow card) 85'; Chaplin 90+4'	Report	Martin 34'; Huddlestone 43' (pen.)	Stadium: Oakwell; Attendance: 13,634; Referee: Tony Harrington

5 October 2019 11	Preston North End	5–1	Barnsley	Preston
15:00 BST	Johnson 31', 61'; Barkhuizen 50'; Pearson 63'; Browne (yellow card) 67'; Harrop 77'	Report	McGeehan (yellow card) 27' (goal) 43'; Williams (yellow card) 65'; Wilks (yellow card) 67'	Stadium: Deepdale; Attendance: 12,431; Referee: Gavin Ward

19 October 2019 12	Barnsley	1–1	Swansea City	Barnsley
15:00 BST	Mowatt 70'; Halme (yellow card) 77'	Report	Ayew 67'; Byers (yellow card) 73'	Stadium: Oakwell; Attendance: 12,424; Referee: Andy Woolmer

22 October 2019 13	West Bromwich Albion	2–2	Barnsley	West Bromwich
20:00 BST	Furlong (yellow card) 40'; Sawyers (yellow card) 42'; Diaby 68' (o.g.); Pereira 81'; Townsend (yellow card) 90+5'	Report	Woodrow 18', 24'; Brown (yellow card) 22'; Andersen (yellow card) 32'; Dougall (yellow card) 60'; Cavaré (yellow card) 74'; Collins (yellow card) 77'; Chaplin (yellow card) 84'; McGeehan (yellow card) 85'; Mowatt (yellow card) 90+3'	Stadium: The Hawthorns; Attendance: 22,086; Referee: Darren Bond

26 October 2019 14	Huddersfield Town	2–1	Barnsley	Huddersfield
15:00 BST	Schindler 30' (yellow card) 86'; Grant 53'	Report	Brown 79'; Mowatt (yellow card) 90+4'	Stadium: John Smith’s Stadium; Attendance: 22,718; Referee: James Linington

1 November 2019 15	Barnsley	2–2	Bristol City	Barnsley
19:45 GMT	Diaby (yellow card) 42'; Halme 77'; Thomas (yellow card) 84'; Woodrow 90+4'	Report	Williams 43'; Weimann 71'	Stadium: Oakwell; Attendance: 12,178; Referee: Jarred Gillett

9 November 2019 16	Barnsley	2–4	Stoke City	Barnsley
15:00 GMT	Halme (yellow card) 45+1'; McGeehan 47' (yellow card) 52'; Cavaré (yellow card) 65'; Schmidt 82'	Report	Clucas 8', 67'; Gregory 30' (pen.); Batth (yellow card) 59'; Allen 64'	Stadium: Oakwell; Attendance: 14,891; Referee: Jeremy Simpson

23 November 2019 17	Blackburn Rovers	3–2	Barnsley	Blackburn
15:00 GMT	Dack 24', 86'; Gallagher (yellow card) 56'; Downing 69'	Report	Brown (yellow card) 22'; Chaplin 48'; Woodrow 82'	Stadium: Ewood Park; Attendance: 13,781; Referee: Dean Whitestone

27 November 2019 18	Middlesbrough	1–0	Barnsley	Middlesbrough
19:45 GMT	Howson (yellow card) 43'; Fletcher 54'; Wing (yellow card) 64'; Bola (yellow card) 81'	Report		Stadium: Riverside Stadium; Attendance: 18,043; Referee: Oliver Langford

30 November 2019 19	Barnsley	3–1	Hull City	Barnsley
15:00 GMT	Mowatt 23'; Bähre 75'; Chaplin 90+5'	Report	Burke (yellow card) 60'; Lewis-Potter 81'	Stadium: Oakwell; Attendance: 13,598; Referee: John Brooks

7 December 2019 20	Cardiff City	3–2	Barnsley	Cardiff
15:00 GMT	Diaby 20' (o.g.); Ward 68'; Tomlin (yellow card) 80' (goal) 90+4'	Report	Chaplin 17'; Halme (yellow card) 40'; Peltier 48' (o.g.); Bähre (yellow card) 62'; Andersen (yellow card) 80'; Williams (yellow card) 90+1'; Mowatt (yellow card) 90+5'	Stadium: Cardiff City Stadium; Attendance: 21,380; Referee: Paul Tierney

11 December 2019 21	Barnsley	1–1	Reading	Barnsley
19:45 GMT	Woodrow 58'; Sibbick (yellow card) 62'; Dougall (yellow card) 81'	Report	Morrison (yellow card) 45+1'; João 76'	Stadium: Oakwell; Attendance: 11,510; Referee: Matt Donohue

14 December 2019 22	Barnsley	5–3	Queens Park Rangers	Barnsley
15:00 GMT	Chaplin 7', 18', 52'; Woodrow 60' (pen.); Thomas (yellow card) 68'; Brown (yellow card) 81'; Diaby 82'; Dougall (yellow card) 84'; Mowatt (yellow card) 85'	Report	Amos 12', 54'; Chair (yellow card) 81' (goal) 90+4'; Wells (yellow card) 85'; Hall (yellow card) 89'	Stadium: Oakwell; Attendance: 12,212; Referee: Keith Stroud

21 December 2019 23	Millwall	1–2	Barnsley	Bermondsey
15:00 GMT	Wallace (yellow card) 75'; O'Brien 85'; Molumby (yellow card) 88'	Report	Andersen (yellow card) 23'; Chaplin 39'; Woodrow (yellow card) 82'; Diaby (yellow card) 85'; Halme (yellow card) 86'; Schmidt 90+4'	Stadium: The Den; Attendance: 12,682; Referee: Jarred Gillett

26 December 2019 24	Barnsley	1–1	West Bromwich Albion	Barnsley
15:00 GMT	Diaby (yellow card) 11'; Halme 90'	Report	Krovinović 5' (yellow card) 63'; Robson-Kanu (yellow card) 85'; Hegazi (yellow card) 90+2'	Stadium: Oakwell; Attendance: 17,049; Referee: Tony Harrington

29 December 2019 25	Swansea City	0–0	Barnsley	Swansea
15:00 GMT	Carroll (yellow card) 38'	Report	Mowatt (yellow card) 23'; Andersen (yellow card) 28'; Diaby (yellow card) 49'; Chaplin (yellow card) 90'	Stadium: Liberty Stadium; Attendance: 17,097; Referee: Antony Coggins

2 January 2020 26	Derby County	2–1	Barnsley	Derby
19:45 GMT	Marriott 45'; Waghorn 57'; Holmes (yellow card) 77'	Report	Simões 50'	Stadium: Pride Park Stadium; Attendance: 27,782; Referee: Dean Whitestone

11 January 2020 27	Barnsley	2–1	Huddersfield Town	Barnsley
15:00 GMT	Mowatt 14'; Chaplin 65'; Thomas (yellow card) 68'; Diaby (yellow card) 73'	Report	Simpson (yellow card) 53'; O'Brien 66'; Chalobah (yellow card) 69'; Bacuna (yellow card) 78'; Hadergjonaj (yellow card) 90+1'; Campbell (yellow card) 90+2'	Stadium: Oakwell; Attendance: 17,158; Referee: Simon Hooper

18 January 2020 28	Bristol City	1–0	Barnsley	Ashton Gate
15:00 GMT	Eliasson 87' (yellow card) 88'	Report	Halme (yellow card) 61'; Williams (yellow card) 69'	Stadium: Ashton Gate Stadium; Attendance: 20,570; Referee: Darren Bond

21 January 2020 29	Barnsley	0–3	Preston North End	Barnsley
19:45 GMT	Woodrow (yellow card) 83'	Report	Barkhuizen 19', 45'; Johnson 34'; Harrop (yellow card) 57'	Stadium: Oakwell; Attendance: 12,207; Referee: Jeremy Simpson

1 February 2020 30	Charlton Athletic	2–1	Barnsley	Charlton
15:00 GMT	Taylor 9'; Lockyer (yellow card) 33'; Green 45+2'	Report	Sollbauer (yellow card) 22'; Andersen (yellow card) 41'; Chaplin (yellow card) 60'; Williams (yellow card) 62'; Woodrow 71'	Stadium: The Valley; Attendance: 19,870; Referee: John Brooks

8 February 2020 31	Barnsley	1–1	Sheffield Wednesday	Barnsley
15:00 GMT	Woodrow 24'; Styles (yellow card) 80'	Report	Windass 16'; Da Cruz (yellow card) 87'; Lee (yellow card) 90+2'	Stadium: Oakwell; Attendance: 17,789; Referee: Tim Robinson

11 February 2020 32	Barnsley	0–1	Birmingham City	Barnsley
19:45 GMT	Andersen (yellow card) 28'	Report	Jutkiewicz (yellow card) 68'; Hogan 76'	Stadium: Oakwell; Attendance: 12,788; Referee: Dean Whitestone

15 February 2020 33	Fulham	0–3	Barnsley	Fulham
15:00 GMT	Bryan (yellow card) 29'	Report	Woodrow 24' (pen.), 79'; Halme (yellow card) 26'; Brown 51'	Stadium: Craven Cottage; Attendance: 18,516; Referee: James Linington

22 February 2020 34	Barnsley	1–0	Middlesbrough	Barnsley
15:00 GMT	Chaplin 73'; Woodrow (yellow card) 78'; Bähre (yellow card) 89'	Report		Stadium: Oakwell; Attendance: 16,106; Referee: Geoff Eltringham

26 February 2020 35	Hull City	0–1	Barnsley	Kingston upon Hull
19:45 GMT	Irvine (yellow card) 49'	Report	Halme (yellow card) 41'; Woodrow 42'	Stadium: KCOM Stadium; Attendance: 10,272; Referee: David Coote

29 February 2020 36	Reading	2–0	Barnsley	Reading
15:00 GMT	Méïté 17'; Pușcaș 60' (yellow card) 61'	Report	Mowatt (yellow card) 39'; Williams (yellow card) 42'; Sollbauer (yellow card) 54'	Stadium: Madejski Stadium; Attendance: 13,263; Referee: Jeremy Simpson

7 March 2020 37	Barnsley	0–2	Cardiff City	Barnsley
15:00 GMT		Report	Vaulks 65'; Paterson 66'	Stadium: Oakwell; Attendance: 12,751; Referee: James Linington

20 June 2020 38	Queens Park Rangers	0–1	Barnsley	Shepherd's Bush
15:00 BST		Report	Simões 7'; Chaplin (yellow card) 90+2'	Stadium: Kiyan Prince Foundation Stadium; Attendance: 0 Referee: Andy Davies
Note: Season was suspended until 3 April 2020, due to the COVID-19 pandemic. The match was rescheduled to 20 June.

27 June 2020 39	Barnsley	0–0	Millwall	Barnsley
13:00 BST	Williams (yellow card) 72'; Brown (yellow card) 89'	Report	Bennett (yellow card) 72'; Molumby (yellow card) 72'	Stadium: Oakwell; Attendance: 0 Referee: Jeremy Simpson
Note: Season was suspended until 3 April 2020, due to the COVID-19 pandemic. The match was rescheduled to 27 June.

30 June 2020 40	Barnsley	2–0	Blackburn Rovers	Barnsley
18:00 BST	Simões (yellow card) 39'; Chaplin 58'; Brown 76'	Report	Brereton (red card) 74'; Davenport (yellow card) 90+1'; Chapman (yellow card) 90+3'	Stadium: Oakwell; Attendance: 0 Referee: Tony Harrington
Note: Season was suspended until 3 April 2020, due to the COVID-19 pandemic. The match was rescheduled to 30 June.

4 July 2020 41	Stoke City	4–0	Barnsley	Stoke-on-Trent
15:00 BST	Vokes 8'; Campbell 10', 38', (yellow card) 67'; Powell (yellow card) 31'; Ince 87'	Report		Stadium: bet365 Stadium; Attendance: 0 Referee: Andy Woolmer
Note: On 3 April, the English Football League decided to postpone all football until safe to do so due to the COVID-19 pandemic. The match was rescheduled to 4 July.

7 July 2020 42	Luton Town	1–1	Barnsley	Luton
18:00 BST	Berry 13' (yellow card) 64'; Sluga (yellow card) 16'; Potts (yellow card) 42'; Cranie (yellow card) 90+1'	Report	Sollbauer (yellow card) 54'; Andersen (yellow card) 63'; Halme 84'	Stadium: Kenilworth Road; Attendance: 0 Referee: Dean Whitestone
Note: On 3 April, the English Football League decided to postpone all football until safe to do so due to the COVID-19 pandemic. The match was rescheduled to 7 July.

11 July 2020 43	Barnsley	0–0	Wigan Athletic	Barnsley
15:00 BST	Mowatt (yellow card) 56'; Simões (yellow card) 64'	Report	Robinson (yellow card) 38'; Fox (red card) 71'; Gelhardt (yellow card) 77'; Williams (yellow card) 90+2'	Stadium: Oakwell; Attendance: 0 Referee: David Webb
Note: On 3 April, the English Football League decided to postpone all football until safe to do so due to the COVID-19 pandemic. The match was rescheduled to 11 July.

16 July 2020 44	Leeds United	1–0	Barnsley	Leeds
19:45 BST	Sollbauer 28' (o.g.); Hernández (yellow card) 90+2'	Report	Sollbauer (yellow card) 90+4'	Stadium: Elland Road; Attendance: 0 Referee: Jarred Gillett
Note: On 3 April, the English Football League decided to postpone all football until safe to do so due to the COVID-19 pandemic. The match was rescheduled to 16 July.

19 July 2020 45	Barnsley	1–0	Nottingham Forest	Barnsley
15:00 BST	Schmidt 90+4'	Report	Watson (yellow card) 51'	Stadium: Oakwell; Attendance: 0 Referee: Scott Duncan
Note: On 3 April, the English Football League decided to postpone all football until safe to do so due to the COVID-19 pandemic. The match was rescheduled to 19 July.

22 July 2020 46	Brentford	1–2	Barnsley	Brentford
19:30 BST	Dasilva 73'; Nørgaard (yellow card) 79'; Jansson (yellow card) 85'	Report	Styles 41'; Williams (yellow card) 55'; Sollbauer (yellow card) 75'; Oduor 90+1'	Stadium: Griffin Park; Attendance: 0 Referee: Robert Jones
Note: On 3 April, the English Football League decided to postpone all football until safe to do so due to the COVID-19 pandemic. The match was rescheduled to 22 July.

=== FA Cup ===
The third round draw was made live on BBC Two from Etihad Stadium, Micah Richards and Tony Adams conducted the draw. The fourth round draw was made by Alex Scott and David O'Leary on Monday, 6 January.

5 January 2020 Third round	Crewe Alexandra	1–3	Barnsley	Crewe
15:00 GMT	Green 48'	Report	Brown 3'; Chaplin 75'; Thomas 90+4'	Stadium: Alexandra Stadium; Attendance: 5,158; Referee: James Linington

25 January 2020 Fourth round	Portsmouth	4–2	Barnsley	Milton
15:00 GMT	Close 37'; Marquis 45+1'; Curtis 62'; Burgess 76'	Report	Woodrow 60'; Chaplin 90+1'	Stadium: Fratton Park; Attendance: 13,286; Referee: Graham Scott

=== EFL Cup ===
The first round draw was made on 20 June.

13 August 2019 First round	Barnsley	0–3	Carlisle United	Barnsley
19:45 BST	Styles (yellow card) 48'; Andersen (yellow card) 58'; Bähre (yellow card) 83'	Report	McKirdy 24'; Bridge 58' (pen.); Thomas 64'	Stadium: Oakwell; Attendance: 5,208; Referee: Ben Toner

== Transfers ==
=== Transfers in ===
Date from	Position	Nationality	Name	From	Fee	Ref.
1 July 2019	CB	(Denmark)	Mads Juel Andersen	(Denmark) AC Horsens	Undisclosed	
1 July 2019	AM	(Germany)	Mike-Steven Bähre	(Germany) Hannover 96	Undisclosed	
1 July 2019	GK	(England)	Bradley Collins	(England) Chelsea	Free transfer	
1 July 2019	GK	(Austria)	Samuel Şahin-Radlinger	(Germany) Hannover 96	Free transfer	
1 July 2019	RW	(England)	Luke Thomas	(England) Derby County	Undisclosed	
2 July 2019	RB	(England)	Toby Sibbick	(England) AFC Wimbledon	Undisclosed	
3 July 2019	CB	(Finland)	Aapo Halme	(England) Leeds United	Undisclosed	
5 July 2019	CB	(Senegal)	Bambo Diaby	(Belgium) KSC Lokeren	Undisclosed	
5 July 2019	LW	(England)	Mallik Wilks	(England) Leeds United	Undisclosed	
8 July 2019	CF	(England)	Chris Sang	(England) Bury	Free transfer	
8 July 2019	CM	(England)	Keaton Ward	(England) Mansfield Town	Free transfer	
8 July 2019	CM	(England)	Alex Wollerton	(England) Leeds United	Free transfer	
19 July 2019	CF	(England)	Conor Chaplin	(England) Coventry City	Undisclosed	
8 August 2019	RW	(Kenya)	Clarke Oduor	(England) Leeds United	Undisclosed	
8 August 2019	CF	(Austria)	Patrick Schmidt	(Austria) Admira Wacker Mödling	Undisclosed	
6 January 2020	CM	(Austria)	Marcel Ritzmaier	(Austria) Wolfsberger AC	Undisclosed	
24 January 2020	CB	(Austria)	Michael Sollbauer	(Austria) Wolfsberger AC	Undisclosed	

=== Loans in ===
Date from	Position	Nationality	Name	From	Date until	Ref.
9 January 2020	RB	(Germany)	Kilian Ludewig	(Austria) Red Bull Salzburg	30 June 2020	
31 January 2020	LM	(Scotland)	Ethan Erhahon	(Scotland) St Mirren	30 June 2020	

=== Loans out ===
Date from	Position	Nationality	Name	To	Date until	Ref.
26 July 2019	CF	(Nigeria)	Victor Adeboyejo	(England) Bristol Rovers	24 January 2020	
22 August 2019	CF	(England)	George Miller	(England) Scunthorpe United	30 June 2020	
21 December 2019	CF	(England)	Chris Sang	(England) Guiseley	27 February 2020	
7 January 2020	CM	(Northern Ireland)	Cameron McGeehan	(England) Portsmouth	30 June 2020	
14 January 2020	RW	(England)	Jordan Green	(Wales) Newport County	30 June 2020	
17 January 2020	LW	(England)	Mallik Wilks	(England) Hull City	30 June 2020	
24 January 2020	CF	(Nigeria)	Victor Adeboyejo	(England) Cambridge United	30 June 2020	
24 January 2020	RB	(England)	Toby Sibbick	(Scotland) Heart of Midlothian	30 June 2020	
3 March 2020	DF	(England)	Harry Gagen	(England) Ossett United	30 June 2020	

=== Transfers out ===
Date from	Position	Nationality	Name	To	Fee	Ref.
1 July 2019	FW	(Uruguay)	Mateo Aramburu	Free agent	Released	
1 July 2019	CM	(England)	Tai-Reece Chisholm	Free agent	Released	
1 July 2019	GK	(Wales)	Adam Davies	(England) Stoke City	Free transfer	
1 July 2019	LB	(England)	Zeki Fryers	(England) Swindon Town	Released	
1 July 2019	RW	(Wales)	Ryan Hedges	(Scotland) Aberdeen	Free transfer	
1 July 2019	LW	(Wales)	Lloyd Isgrove	(England) Swindon Town	Released	
1 July 2019	CB	(England)	Adam Jackson	(Scotland) Hibernian	Released	
1 July 2019	CB	(Scotland)	Liam Lindsay	(England) Stoke City	Undisclosed	
1 July 2019	AM	(England)	Dan McBeam	Free agent	Released	
1 July 2019	MF	(England)	Elvis Otim	Free agent	Released	
1 July 2019	LB	(England)	Cameron Simpson	Free agent	Released	
1 July 2019	CB	(England)	Will Smith	(England) Harrogate Town	Free transfer	
1 July 2019	MF	(England)	Louis Walsh	Free agent	Released	
1 July 2019	RB	(England)	Louis Wardle	(England) Matlock Town	Released	
2 July 2019	CB	(England)	Ethan Pinnock	(England) Brentford	Undisclosed	
5 August 2019	CF	(Wales)	Kieffer Moore	(England) Wigan Athletic	Undisclosed	
7 August 2019	LW	(Israel)	Amir Berkovich	(Israel) Maccabi Tel Aviv	Free transfer	
5 November 2019	FW	(England)	Kieran Feeney	(England) Lancaster City	Free transfer	
30 January 2020	RM	(England)	Dylan Mottley-Henry	(England) Bradford City	Undisclosed	
17 February 2020	RB	(Guadeloupe)	Dimitri Cavaré	(Switzerland) FC Sion	Undisclosed	
2 July 2020	LW	(England)	Malik Wilks	(England) Hull City	Undisclosed	
9 July 2020	RB	(Malta)	Lee Ciantar	(Gibraltar) Europa Point	Released	
