= Alex Mowatt =

English footballer (born 1995)

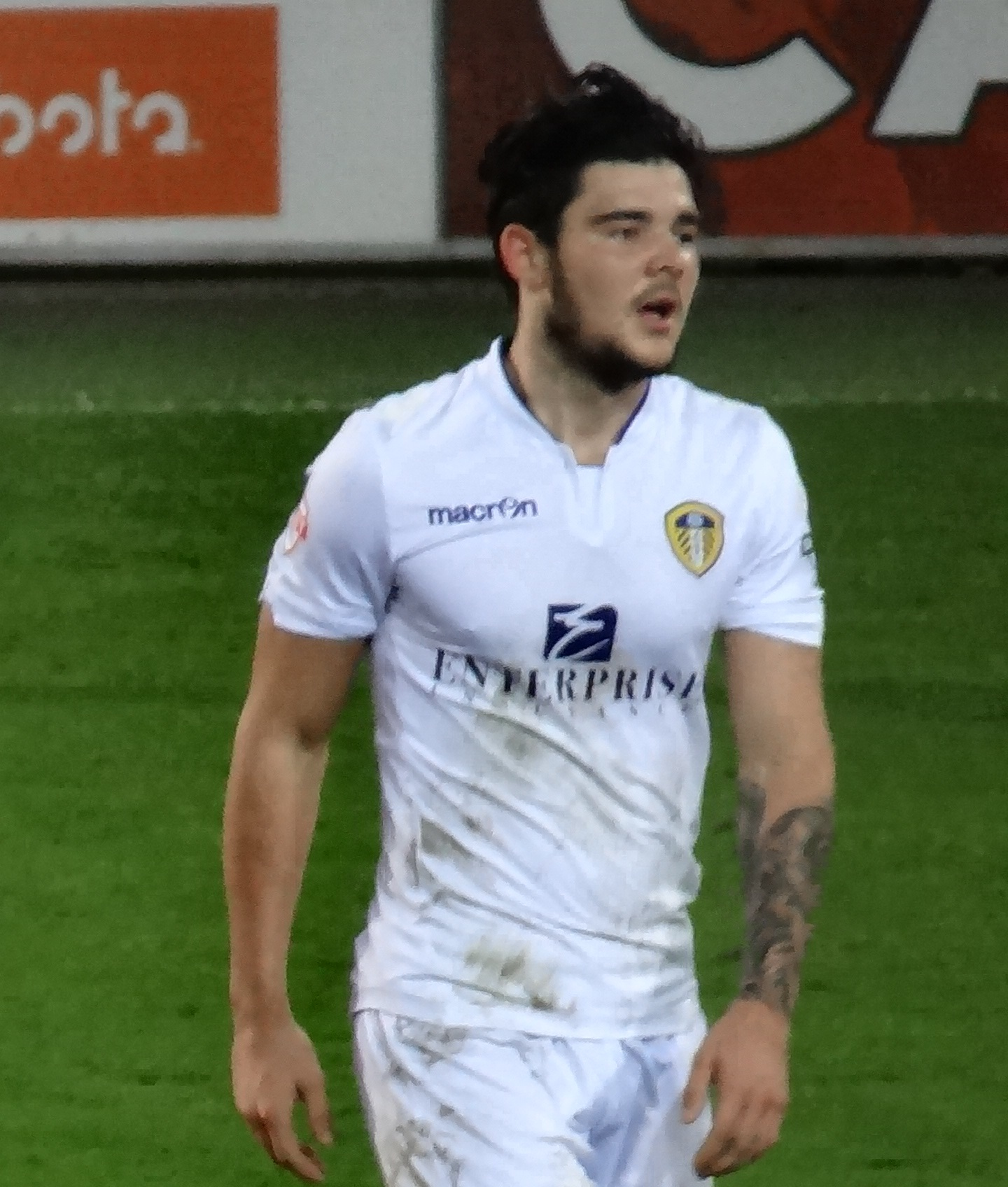
- Mowatt playing for Leeds United in 2014

Personal information
- Full name: Alex James Mowatt
- Date of birth: 13 February 1995 (age 31)
- Place of birth: Doncaster, England
- Height: 5 ft 10 in (1.77 m)
- Position: Defensive midfielder

Team information
- Current team: Derby County
- Number: 20

Youth career
- 2004–2013: Leeds United

Senior career*
Years	Team	Apps	(Gls)
2013–2017	Leeds United	116	(12)
2017–2021	Barnsley	146	(20)
2017–2018	→ Oxford United (loan)	30	(2)
2021–2026	West Bromwich Albion	160	(14)
2022–2023	→ Middlesbrough (loan)	28	(0)
2026–	Derby County	12	(0)

International career
2014	England U19	1	(0)
2015	England U20	1	(0)
- * Club domestic league appearances and goals as of 22:23, 6 November 2026 (UTC)

Alex James Mowatt (born 13 February 1995) is an English professional footballer who plays as a defensive midfielder for EFL Championship club Derby County.

== Club career ==
=== Leeds United ===
Mowatt was born in Doncaster and attended Don Valley Academy, whilst playing for junior club Bentley Pumas Doncaster, Mowatt's talents were recognised by Leeds in 2003 and Mowatt was signed to Leeds United's academy at the age of nine. After progressing through Leeds youth ranks, including captaining Leeds Under 18s, Mowatt signed a professional deal at Leeds. Mowatt captained Leeds Under 18s team managed by Richard Naylor and led the Under 18s to win the Under 18 League Championship during the 2012–13 season. He captained Leeds Under 18s during a 3–1 loss against Liverpool Under 18s on 1 March 2013 at Anfield in Leeds' Under 18s in the FA Youth Cup run. The Yorkshire Evening Post's Phil Hay said that Mowatt's performances and style of play was reminiscent to a young Barry Ferguson.

==== 2013–14 season ====
After his impressive performances in the academy and Neil Redfearn's Development Squad, Mowatt broke into the Leeds team during the 2013–14 season during the pre-season training with the first team. He was named on the bench for Leeds' first team in a 2–1 win against Chesterfield in the League Cup.

On 27 August 2013, Mowatt made his debut for Leeds when he started his first professional game in Leeds 3–1 victory against Doncaster Rovers in the League Cup. After the match, Leeds manager Brian McDermott praised his performance.

Mowatt was given his second start for Leeds in the match against Newcastle United in the League Cup and put in another impressive performance despite a 2–0 loss for Leeds. His performance was rewarded when he was named in the starting line-up to make his league debut in a 2–0 defeat away to Millwall. On 5 December 2013, he signed a new three-and-a-half-year contract with the club.

On 1 February 2014, only the day after the alleged sacking of the man who gave Mowatt his debut, Brian McDermott, Mowatt scored his first goal for Leeds in a 5–1 victory against local rivals Huddersfield Town.

Mowatt won the Leeds United Young Player of the Season Award at the club's annual awards, on 2 May. He also finished third in the voting for the Fans' Player of the Year Award.

==== 2014–15 season ====
On 1 August, Mowatt was assigned the number 27 shirt for the 2014–15 season. After picking up an injury against Birmingham City on 26 April 2014 and a long spell out injured, he returned to the Leeds starting 11 making his first appearance of the season against Bolton Wanderers on 30 August 2014.

On 13 September 2014 Mowatt scored his first league goal of the 2014–15 season against Birmingham City in a 1–1 draw. he badly bruised his toe during the game which ruled him out of the following fixture against Bournemouth. He followed this up with a goal in a 3–1 loss against Cardiff City on 1 November in Neil Redfearn's first game as permanent head coach, in the following game on 4 November he scored a brace with two long range efforts in a 2–2 draw against Charlton Athletic. After getting three goals and two assists in November, on 4 December Mowatt was shortlisted for the Championship's Player of the Month award, but lost out to Brentford's Andre Gray. He was handed the Football League's Young Player of the Month award for November on 18 December 2014.

Mowatt scored a free kick in a 1–0 win against Millwall on 14 February; he followed this up with a long range strike in a 1–0 victory against Middlesbrough on 21 February. He scored another free kick on 4 March in a 2–1 victory against Ipswich Town before following this up with a right footed volley from outside the box in a 1–0 victory against Wigan Athletic on 7 March. His ninth goal of the season came on 6 April in a 4–3 loss against Wolverhampton Wanderers with Mowatt scoring a curling long range effort.

On 9 April, after rumoured Premier League interest in Mowatt and teammates Lewis Cook, Charlie Taylor and Sam Byram, head coach Neil Redfearn challenged Leeds United's owners to keep a hold of their home grown talents.

On 1 May 2015, Mowatt was named the Yorkshire Evening Post's Player of the Year for the 2014–15 season. On 2 May 2015, Mowatt won the Fans' Player of the Year Award and also the Players' Player of the Year award at Leeds United's official end of 2014–15 season awards ceremony.

==== 2015–16 season ====
On 31 July 2015, Mowatt was given the number 10 shirt for the upcoming 2015–16 season. He scored the opening goal in United's 2–0 pre-season win over Everton in what was described by a pundit as a "Barcelona style goal". On 4 November 2015, he scored an unstoppable shot from 25 yards to the top corner of the goal in the 1–0 victory over Cardiff. On 7 November, he scored again in the following game with a long-range strike in a 3–0 victory against Yorkshire rivals Huddersfield Town.

==== 2016–17 season ====
On 5 August, Mowatt was given the squad number 27 shirt for the 2016–17 season with Marcus Antonsson taking over the number 10 shirt previously held by Mowatt. On 9 January 2017, he scored his first goal of the season in Leeds' 2–1 FA Cup win against Cambridge United.

=== Barnsley ===
On 27 January 2017, Mowatt joined Championship rivals Barnsley on a two-and-a-half-year deal, for an undisclosed fee reported to be around £600,000. He retained the number 27 shirt he had worn at Leeds United.

==== 2016–17 season ====
Mowatt arrived under significant pressure to fill the vacancy left by Conor Hourihane who had departed to Aston Villa earlier in the transfer window. He made his debut on 31 January, during which he was sent off just before half time. After his return from suspension he featured regularly until the end of the season, scoring his first goal for Barnsley in the penultimate game of the season in a 3–2 defeat to Bristol City.

==== 2017–18 season: Loan to Oxford United ====
Mowatt was sent a season-long loan to Oxford United on 31 August 2017 after failing to make the impact desired by manager Paul Heckingbottom. Barnsley instead elected to sign Gary Gardner on a season-long loan from Aston Villa to fill the gap in central midfield. Heckingbottom emphasised that Mowatt's loan move was only temporary and that he envisaged a career for him at Oakwell.

==== 2018–19 season ====
Mowatt returned to Barnsley ahead of the 2018–19 season after their relegation to League One. He formed a key partnership in midfield with teammate Cameron McGeehan. The pair played together in 39 of Barnsley's 46 league matches, Mowatt appearing in all of them. Mowatt scored his first goal of the season in a 1–1 draw against Plymouth Argyle on 2 October 2018. On 27 October 2018, Mowatt scored the only goal of the game in a 1–0 home victory over Bristol Rovers through a left-footed shot from outside the area. On 12 January 2019, Mowatt put in a man of the match performance in a 3–0 victory against Bradford City, assisting the first two goals for Jacob Brown and Kieffer Moore and scoring the third himself. Mowatt scored two goals over Easter weekend, the first in a 2–1 victory over Shrewsbury Town at Oakwell on 19 April 2019, the second in a 3–0 over Plymouth Argyle at Home Park on 22 April 2019.

==== 2019–2021 ====
Mowatt was named the club's player of the season during the 2019–20 campaign as Barnsley avoided relegation from the Championship with a dramatic win over Brentford on the final day of the season. On 9 April 2021, Mowatt was awarded the Championship Player of the Month award as Barnsley pushed for play-offs.

=== West Bromwich Albion ===
On 2 July 2021, West Bromwich Albion announced Mowatt had followed former Barnsley coach Valérien Ismaël in joining the club. He scored his first goal for West Brom in a 4–0 win against Sheffield United on 18 August.

==== Middlesbrough (loan) ====
On 13 August 2022, Mowatt joined Middlesbrough on loan for the 2022–23 season.

On 22 May 2024, West Brom announced it had offered the player a new contract.

=== Derby County ===
After a rejected bid earlier in August 2026, Mowatt joined fellow Championship club Derby County on 14 August, signing a two-year deal for an undisclosed fee, reported to be in the region of £600,000. On 15 August, Mowatt made his Derby County debut as a 54th minute substitute for Sam Szmodics in a 2–1 Championship loss at Charlton Athletic.

== International career ==
In October 2013, after being watched by England Under 21s manager Gareth Southgate against Birmingham City, Mowatt was called up to the England U19 for the fixture against Hungary in November.

On 5 March 2014, Mowatt made his England U19 debut in a 3–0 victory against Turkey.

Mowatt was watched by Scotland's assistant, Mark McGhee, during Leeds' 2–0 defeat to Brighton on 24 February. Mowatt qualifies for Scotland through his father's side of the family.

On 25 March 2015, Mowatt was named on the subs bench for England U20 against Mexico, but did not feature in the game. However, four days later Mowatt made his debut against the United States, completing 79 minutes of the match. In December 2015, Leeds head coach Steve Evans revealed that Scotland manager Gordon Strachan had been in touch regarding the possibility of calling up Mowatt for the full Scotland national side.

== Career statistics ==
As of match played 6 November 2026

Appearances and goals by club, season and competition
Club	Season	League			FA Cup		League Cup		Other		Total	
Club	Season	Division	Apps	Goals	Apps	Goals	Apps	Goals	Apps	Goals	Apps	Goals
Leeds United	2013–14	Championship	29	1	0	0	2	0	—		31	1
Leeds United	2014–15	Championship	38	9	0	0	0	0	—		38	9
Leeds United	2015–16	Championship	34	2	1	0	1	0	—		36	2
Leeds United	2016–17	Championship	15	0	1	1	4	0	—		20	1
Leeds United	Total		116	12	2	1	7	0	0	0	125	13
Barnsley	2016–17	Championship	11	1	0	0	0	0	—		11	1
Barnsley	2017–18	Championship	1	0	0	0	1	0	—		2	0
Barnsley	2018–19	League One	46	8	3	0	1	0	1 (Note: Appearances in EFL Trophy)	0	51	8
Barnsley	2019–20	Championship	44	3	2	0	0	0	—		46	3
Barnsley	2020–21	Championship	44	8	3	0	3	0	2 (Note: Appearances in Championship play-offs)	0	52	8
Barnsley	Total		146	20	8	0	5	0	3	0	162	20
Oxford United (loan)	2017–18	League One	30	2	1	0	1	0	3	1	35	3
West Bromwich Albion	2021–22	Championship	34	4	0	0	0	0	—		34	4
West Bromwich Albion	2022–23	Championship	1	0	0	0	1	0	—		2	0
West Bromwich Albion	2023–24	Championship	43	2	2	0	1	0	2	0	48	2
West Bromwich Albion	2024–25	Championship	43	7	1	0	0	0	—		44	7
West Bromwich Albion	2025–26	Championship	39	1	1	0	1	0	—		41	1
West Bromwich Albion	2026–27	Championship	—		—		1	0	—		1	0
West Bromwich Albion	Total		160	14	4	0	4	0	2	0	170	14
Middlesbrough (loan)	2022–23	Championship	28	0	1	0	—		2	0	31	0
Derby County	2026–27	Championship	12	0	0	0	—		—		12	0
Career total			492	48	16	1	16	0	10	1	534	50

== Honours ==
Barnsley

- EFL League One runner-up: 2018–19

Individual

- Leeds United Young Player of the Year: 2013–14
- Football League Young Player of the Month: November 2014
- Leeds United Players' Player of the Year: 2014–15
- Leeds United Player of the Year: 2014–15
- EFL Team of the Season: 2018–19
- PFA Team of the Year: 2018–19 League One
- Barnsley Player of the Season: 2019–20
- Championship Goal of the Month: October 2020
- EFL Championship Player of the Month: March 2021
- EFL Championship Team of the Season: 2020–21
