= Toby Sibbick =

Ugandan footballer (born 1999)

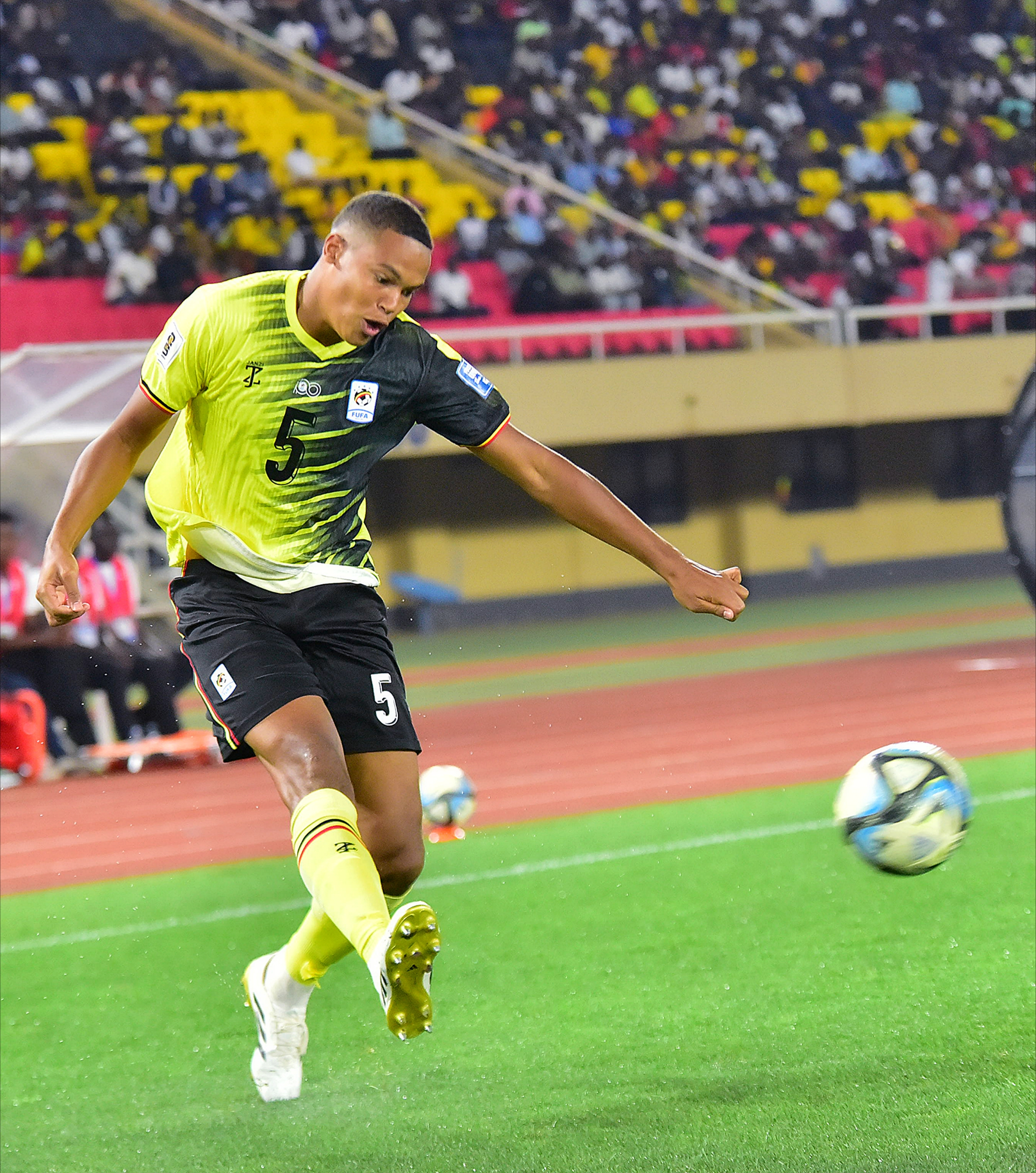

Personal information
- Full name: Toby Peter Sibbick
- Date of birth: 23 May 1999 (age 27)
- Place of birth: Isleworth, England
- Height: 6 ft 2 in (1.89 m)
- Position: Defender

Team information
- Current team: Burton Albion
- Number: 6

Youth career
- Feltham
- 2014–2017: AFC Wimbledon

Senior career*
Years	Team	Apps	(Gls)
2017–2019	AFC Wimbledon	26	(0)
2019–2022	Barnsley	51	(1)
2020	→ Heart of Midlothian (loan)	2	(0)
2020	→ Oostende (loan)	0	(0)
2022–2024	Heart of Midlothian	67	(1)
2024–2025	Wigan Athletic	31	(0)
2025–	Burton Albion	33	(0)

International career^{‡}
2024–	Uganda	4	(0)
- * Club domestic league appearances and goals as of 16 April 2026 (UTC) ‡ National team caps and goals as of 10:35, 24 September 2025 (UTC)

Toby Peter Sibbick (born 23 May 1999) is a professional footballer who plays as a centre-back or right-back for EFL League One club Burton Albion. Born in England, he plays for the Uganda national football team.

== Early life ==
Born in Isleworth to a Ugandan mother and an English father, Sibbick grew up in Feltham, West London.

He started playing football when his father took him to play for Feltham Youth, before later joining Conquest Football Academy. Sibbick gained a trial for AFC Wimbledon after playing against them and then subsequently being scouted.

== Club career ==
=== AFC Wimbledon and early career ===
After being scouted, Sibbick signed his first professional contract with AFC Wimbledon, and made his professional debut on 17 April 2017 in a 0–0 draw against Peterborough United.

He scored his first goals for Wimbledon when he scored twice in an EFL Trophy tie against Tottenham Hotspur Under-23s on 3 October 2017. On 26 January 2019, Sibbick came off the bench scored the fourth goal against West Ham United in the FA Cup fourth round to seal a famous 4–2 win for AFC Wimbledon.

=== Barnsley ===
Sibbick signed for Barnsley in the summer of 2019. He then moved on loan to Scottish club Heart of Midlothian in January 2020.

On 4 August 2020, Sibbick joined Belgian First Division A side Oostende on a season-long loan deal, which was eventually terminated early in December 2020 as Sibbick had difficulties manifesting himself due to the good performance of other young defenders.

He scored his first goal for Barnsley in a 1–1 draw with Cardiff City on 7 August 2021.

=== Heart of Midlothian ===
On 27 January 2022, Sibbick signed with previous loan club Heart of Midlothian on a three-and-a-half-year deal for an undisclosed fee. He made his second debut for Hearts in a 2–0 home win against Motherwell two days later, coming on at half time to replace an injured John Souttar.

=== Wigan Athletic ===
On 24 July 2024, Sibbick joined EFL League One club Wigan Athletic on a two-year contract for an undisclosed fee.

=== Burton Albion ===
On 10 July 2025, Sibbick joined EFL League One club Burton Albion, signing a two-year contract with the option of an additional year for an undisclosed fee.

== International career ==
Sibbick was called up to the Uganda national team for a set of friendlies in March 2024. He debuted with them in a 2–2 draw with Ghana on 27 March 2024. He was later summoned for the World Cup qualifying matches against Mozambique and Guinea Bissau in March 2025 but was an unused substitute for the two games.

On December 7, 2025, he was selected by Paul Put for Uganda's squad to participate in the 2025 Africa Cup of Nations.

== Style of play ==
Sibbick is well known for his versatility, work-rate, and fitness levels, in mainly defending but also the attacking sense. He can operate in mainly defensive positions but has the footballing ability to play further forward if needed. He has been described as: "So comfortable on the ball, as he can also get up and down the pitch brilliantly" and "tall, athletic and has the ability to easily beat his man and find a teammate".

== Career statistics ==
As of 20 May 2024

Appearances and goals by club, season and competition
Club	Season	League			National cup (Note: Includes FA Cup, Scottish Cup)		League cup (Note: Includes EFL Cup, Scottish League Cup)		Europe		Other (Note: Includes appearances in the EFL Trophy)		Total	
Club	Season	Division	Apps	Goals	Apps	Goals	Apps	Goals	Apps	Goals	Apps	Goals	Apps	Goals
AFC Wimbledon	2016–17	League One	2	0	—		—		—		—		2	0
AFC Wimbledon	2017–18	League One	1	0	—		—		—		4	2	5	2
AFC Wimbledon	2018–19	League One	23	0	2	1	2	0	—		3	0	30	1
AFC Wimbledon	AFC Wimbledon Total		26	0	2	1	2	0	0		7	2	37	3
Barnsley	2019–20	Championship	18	0	—		—		—		—		18	0
Barnsley	2020–21	Championship	21	0	3	0	—		—		2 (Note: Appearance(s) in Championship play-offs)	0	26	0
Barnsley	2021–22	Championship	12	1	—		—		—		—		12	1
Barnsley	Total		51	1	3	0	0	0	0		2	0	56	1
Heart of Midlothian (loan)	2019–20	Scottish Premiership	2	0	—		—		—		—		2	0
Heart of Midlothian	2021–22	Scottish Premiership	14	0	3	0	0	0	0	0	0	0	17	0
Heart of Midlothian	2022–23	Scottish Premiership	32	0	3	1	1	0	5	0	0	0	41	1
Heart of Midlothian	2023–24	Scottish Premiership	21	0	1	0	2	0	3	0	0	0	27	0
Heart of Midlothian	Total		69	0	7	1	3	0	8	0	0	0	86	1
Wigan Athletic	2024–25	League One	31	0	4	0	0	0	—		4	0	39	0
Burton Albion	2025–26	League One	0	0	0	0	0	0	—		0	0	0	0
Career Total			176	1	16	2	5	0	8	0	13	2	218	5
