= Patrick Schmidt (footballer, born 1998) =

Austrian footballer

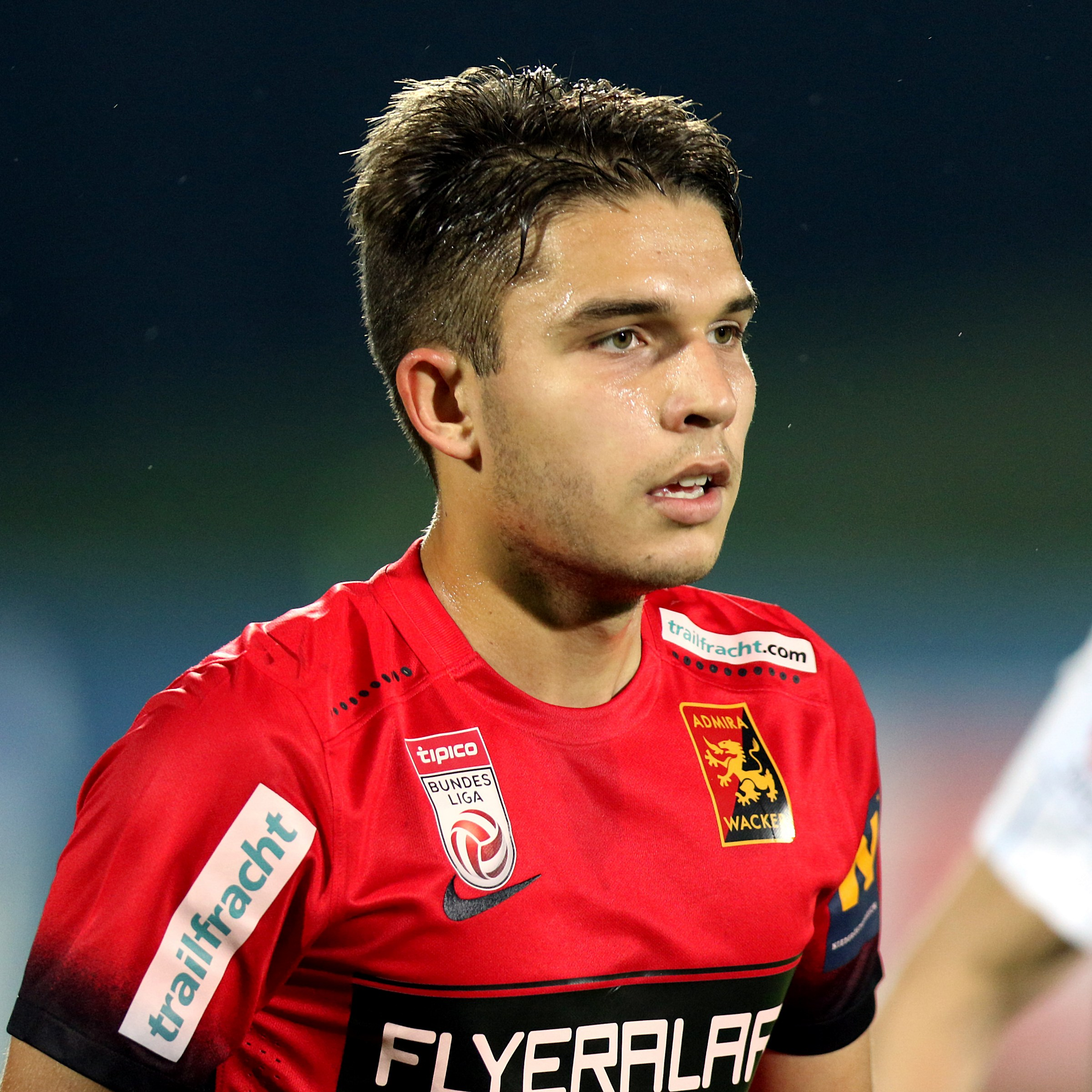

Personal information
- Full name: Patrick Schmidt
- Date of birth: 22 July 1998 (age 28)
- Place of birth: Eisenstadt, Austria
- Height: 1.79 m (5 ft 10 in)
- Position: Forward

Team information
- Current team: First Vienna
- Number: 16

Youth career
- 2005–2011: UFC St. Georgen
- 2011–2015: Admira Wacker

Senior career*
Years	Team	Apps	(Gls)
2015–2018	Admira Wacker II	46	(24)
2016–2019	Admira Wacker	64	(28)
2019–2022	Barnsley	37	(3)
2021	→ SV Ried (loan)	10	(1)
2021–2022	→ Esbjerg fB (loan)	21	(2)
2022–2024	Admira Wacker	50	(7)
2024–	First Vienna	26	(5)

International career
2013–2014	Austria U16	6	(2)
2014–2015	Austria U17	8	(1)
2015–2016	Austria U18	2	(1)
2016–2017	Austria U19	2	(0)
2017–2020	Austria U21	17	(1)
- * Club domestic league appearances and goals as of 15 October 2025

Patrick Schmidt (born 22 July 1998) is an Austrian professional footballer who plays as a forward for 2. Liga club First Vienna.

== Career ==
After more than three seasons in the Admira Wacker first team, Schmidt joined Championship side Barnsley on 8 August 2019. He scored his first goal for Barnsley on 9 November 2019 against Stoke City.

On 6 February 2021, Schmidt joined Austrian side SV Ried on loan for the remainder of the 2020–21 season.

On 21 June 2021, he joined Esbjerg fB in Denmark on loan for the 2021–22 season.

Schmidt rejoined his former side Admira Wacker on 17 June 2022, signing a two-year contract with an option for an additional year.

On 17 June 2024, Schmidt moved to First Vienna on a two-year deal.

== Career statistics ==
As of match played 14 February 2021

Appearances and goals by club, season and competition
Club	Season	League			Cup		League Cup		Other		Total	
Club	Season	Division	Apps	Goals	Apps	Goals	Apps	Goals	Apps	Goals	Apps	Goals
Admira Wacker II	2015–16	Austrian Regionalliga	23	7	—		—		—		23	7
Admira Wacker II	2016–17	Austrian Regionalliga	13	4	—		—		—		13	4
Admira Wacker II	2017–18	Austrian Regionalliga	6	2	—		—		—		6	2
Admira Wacker II	2018–19	Austrian Regionalliga	4	1	—		—		—		4	1
Admira Wacker II	Total		46	14	—		—		—		46	14
Admira Wacker	2016–17	Austrian Bundesliga	15	1	2	1	—		1 (Note: Appearances in UEFA Europa League)	1	18	3
Admira Wacker	2017–18	Austrian Bundesliga	20	6	1	0	—		0	0	21	6
Admira Wacker	2018–19	Austrian Bundesliga	27	8	1	0	—		2	0	30	8
Admira Wacker	2019–20	Austrian Bundesliga	2	0	1	1	—		0	0	3	1
Admira Wacker	Total		64	15	5	2	—		3	1	72	18
Barnsley	2019–20	Championship	29	3	1	0	0	0	—		30	3
Barnsley	2020–21	Championship	8	0	1	0	2	1	—		11	1
Barnsley	Total		37	3	2	0	2	1	0	0	41	4
SV Ried (loan)	2020–21	Austrian Bundesliga	2	1	0	0	0	0	0	0	2	1
Career total			149	33	7	2	2	1	3	1	161	37
