= Michael Sollbauer =

Austrian footballer

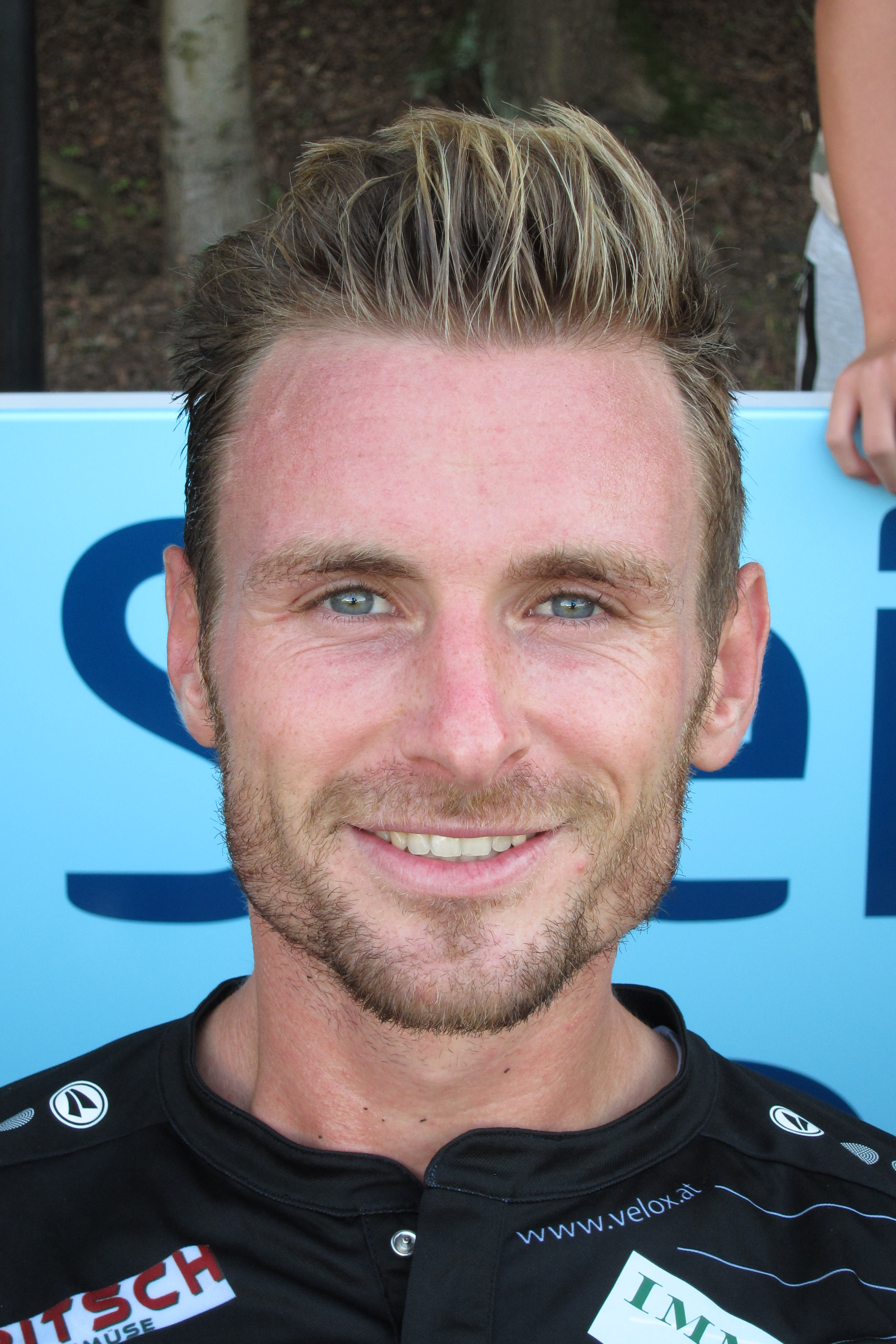
- Sollbauer in 2018

Personal information
- Full name: Michael Sollbauer
- Date of birth: 15 May 1990 (age 36)
- Place of birth: Klein Sankt Paul, Austria
- Height: 1.86 m (6 ft 1 in)
- Position: Defender

Team information
- Current team: Grazer AK
- Number: 21

Youth career
- 1996–2004: WSG Wietersdorf
- 2004–2007: FC Kärnten
- 2007–2008: Austria Kärnten

Senior career*
Years	Team	Apps	(Gls)
2008–2010	Austria Kärnten	18	(0)
2010–2020	Wolfsberger AC	280	(7)
2020–2021	Barnsley	54	(0)
2021–2022	Dynamo Dresden	33	(0)
2022–2024	Rapid Wien	32	(0)
2024–2026	SV Ried	63	(3)
2026–	Grazer AK	0	(0)
- * Club domestic league appearances and goals as of 7 September 2026

Michael Sollbauer (born 15 May 1990) is an Austrian professional footballer who plays as a defender for Grazer AK.

== Career ==
=== Barnsley ===
Sollbauer joined English EFL Championship side Barnsley in January 2020 after ten years with Wolfsberger AC where he made over 200 Austrian top-flight appearances.

=== Dynamo Dresden ===
In July 2021, 2. Bundesliga side confirmed that Sollbauer had joined their squad for an undisclosed fee and he has signed a 2-year deal with the club.

=== SV Ried ===
On 24 June 2024, Sollbauer signed a two-year contract with SV Ried.

=== Grazer AK ===
On 2 September 2026, Sollbauer joined Grazer AK on a one-year deal, with the option of a further year.

== Career statistics ==
As of match played 4 July 2021

Appearances and goals by club, season and competition
Club	Season	League			Cup		League Cup		Other		Total	
Club	Season	Division	Apps	Goals	Apps	Goals	Apps	Goals	Apps	Goals	Apps	Goals
Austria Kärnten	2009–10	Austrian Bundesliga	18	0	3	1	—		0	0	21	1
Wolfsberger AC	2010–11	Austrian First League	29	1	1	0	—		0	0	30	1
Wolfsberger AC	2010–11	Austrian First League	31	3	0	0	—		0	0	31	3
Wolfsberger AC	2012–13	Austrian Bundesliga	34	0	2	0	—		0	0	36	0
Wolfsberger AC	2013–14	Austrian Bundesliga	34	0	3	0	—		0	0	37	0
Wolfsberger AC	2014–15	Austrian Bundesliga	32	0	5	0	—		0	0	37	0
Wolfsberger AC	2015–16	Austrian Bundesliga	25	0	1	0	—		4 (Note: Appearances in UEFA Europa League)	1	30	1
Wolfsberger AC	2016–17	Austrian Bundesliga	23	1	1	0	—		0	0	24	1
Wolfsberger AC	2017–18	Austrian Bundesliga	24	1	2	0	—		0	0	26	1
Wolfsberger AC	2018–19	Austrian Bundesliga	30	1	2	0	—		0	0	32	1
Wolfsberger AC	2019–20	Austrian Bundesliga	18	0	2	0	—		6	0	26	0
Wolfsberger AC	Total		280	7	19	0	—		10	1	309	8
Barnsley	2019–20	EFL Championship	17	0	1	0	0	0	—		18	0
Barnsley	2020–21	EFL Championship	37	0	3	0	3	0	—		43	0
Barnsley	Total		54	0	4	0	3	0	0	0	61	0
Career total			352	7	26	1	3	0	10	1	391	9
