= Conor Chaplin =

English footballer (born 1997)

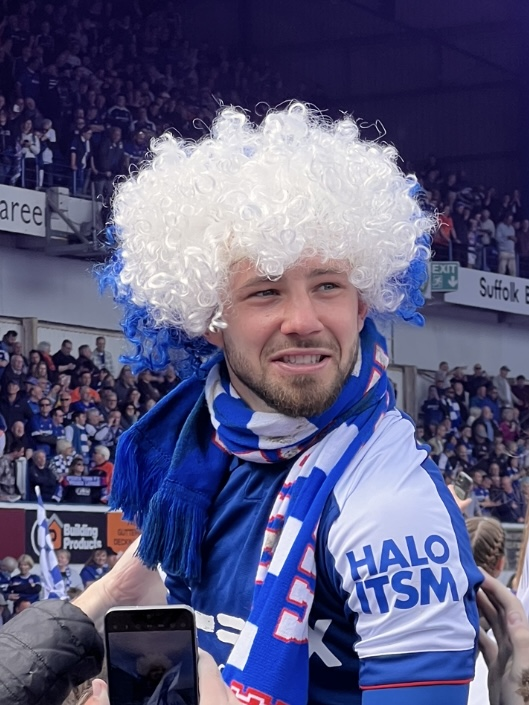
- Chaplin with Ipswich Town in 2024.

Personal information
- Full name: Conor Mark Chaplin
- Date of birth: 16 February 1997 (age 29)
- Place of birth: Worthing, West Sussex, England
- Height: 5 ft 6 in (1.68 m)
- Positions: Attacking midfielder; right midfielder

Team information
- Current team: Leicester City
- Number: 8

Youth career
- 2003–2014: Portsmouth

Senior career*
Years	Team	Apps	(Gls)
2014–2019	Portsmouth	104	(22)
2018–2019	→ Coventry City (loan)	20	(5)
2019	Coventry City	11	(3)
2019–2021	Barnsley	78	(15)
2021–2026	Ipswich Town	154	(49)
2025–2026	→ Portsmouth (loan)	36	(2)
2026–	Leicester City	0	(0)
- * Club domestic league appearances and goals as of 23:05, 4 May 2026 (UTC)

Conor Mark Chaplin (born 16 February 1997) is an English professional footballer who plays as an attacking midfielder or right midfielder for EFL League One club Leicester City.

Chaplin joined the youth set up at Portsmouth in 2003, progressing through the club's academy to make his senior debut in December 2014. He won the 2015 League Two Apprentice Award during his first season as a senior professional. He helped Portsmouth win the EFL League Two title in 2016–17, going on to make 122 appearances and score 25 goals during his time at the club. He joined Coventry City on loan in 2018, before signing permanently for the club in January 2019. After one season at Coventry, he signed for Barnsley in 2019. Chaplin spent two seasons at Barnsley, helping the club to Championship survival during his first season at the club, and then go on to reach the EFL Championship play-offs in the 2020–21 season. In July 2021, Chaplin signed for Ipswich Town. In the 2022–23 season, Chaplin scored 26 league goals to help the club to promotion, scooping the Golden Boot and earning himself a spot in the EFL League One Team of the Season.

== Career ==
=== Portsmouth ===
Born in Worthing, Chaplin progressed through Portsmouth's youth categories after joining the club at the age of six. He was offered a two-year scholarship contract on 3 July 2013.

==== 2014–15 season & senior breakthrough ====
Chaplin signed a two-year professional deal with Pompey on 20 October 2014, after scoring 11 goals in 11 appearances for the under-18's. He made his League Two debut on 13 December, from the bench in a 3–2 home defeat against Accrington Stanley. Chaplin scored his first professional goal on 11 April 2015, netting his team's only goal in a 3–1 away defeat against Morecambe. He made his first start for Pompey in their final game of the season, a 1–1 home draw against York City. At the end of the season he was named the League Two Apprentice of the Year.

==== 2015–16 season ====
Chaplin started the 2015–16 season on the bench, playing second fiddle to first-choice striker Matt Tubbs, but showcased his talents with goals against Championship clubs Derby and Reading in the first and second rounds of the Football League Cup, also scoring in the 3rd round of the FA Cup in a 2–2 draw with Ipswich Town. He scored his first two league goals of the season in a 3–1 win over Barnet on 12 September. Although Chaplin struggled to maintain a first-team place in the league, he would still manage to score 11 goals in 38 appearances in all competitions over the course of the season.

==== 2016–17 season ====
Competition for the sole striking berth in manager Paul Cook's preferred 4–2–3–1 formation was made all the more intense at the start of the 2016–17 season, following the signings of Michael Smith, who made his loan move permanent, as well as Curtis Main from Doncaster Rovers and experienced forward Noel Hunt.

Chaplin subsequently found himself on the bench in the early weeks of the season, before the inconsistent form of Smith and Main, coupled with Hunt's injury problems, saw Chaplin promoted to the starting lineup. He grasped the opportunity, scoring league goals against Wycombe Wanderers, Barnet, Blackpool, Notts County and Cambridge United before the end of October – a run of form which would see him established as Portsmouth's first-choice striker.

As the season continued, Cook would rotate his centre-forwards, and Chaplin lost his place to the more physically imposing Smith. Though Smith would ultimately fall out of favour and move to Northampton Town in the January transfer window, the signing of Eoin Doyle – who had previously played under Cook at Chesterfield – ensured that Chaplin would remain on the bench. Chaplin continued to make cameo appearances as a substitute, however, and took his tally to eight for the season with a last-gasp, 25 yard strike against Barnet to snatch a point in a 1–1 draw on 18 February. Chaplin finished the season with 8 goals in 42 appearances, helping Portsmouth to lift the EFL League Two title.

==== 2017–18 season ====
Following Portsmouth's promotion to EFL League One, Chaplin continued to feature regularly. He scored his first goal of the season on 26 August, netting an equalizer in a 1–1 draw with Wigan Athletic. On 10 February, he scored a late winner in a 2–1 away win against Milton Keynes Dons. Chaplin helped Portsmouth establish themselves in League One after an 8th-placed finish, making 32 appearances in all competitions, scoring 5 goals.

==== Coventry City (loan) ====
At the end of August 2018, Chaplin joined Coventry City on loan with an agreement in place to sign permanently in the following January. He made his debut in a 1–0 defeat against Rochdale on 1 September. Chaplin scored his first goal for the club from the penalty spot in a 2–1 away victory against Oxford United on 9 September.

Chaplin completed his permanent move to Coventry on 4 January. On 19 January Chaplin scored the opener in a 2–1 away defeat to Plymouth Argyle. On 13 April, Chaplin scored the winning goal in a 5–4 away win against Sunderland. He scored 8 goals in 32 appearances for Coventry during the 2018–19 season.

=== Barnsley ===
On 19 July 2019, Chaplin joined Barnsley for an undisclosed fee on a four-year deal. He made his debut for the club as a second-half substitute on the opening day of the 2019–20 season, against Fulham. Two weeks later, he scored his first goal for Barnsley, scoring in a 2–2 draw with Charlton Athletic. He did not score again until 23 November, when he scored in a 3–2 loss against Blackburn Rovers. His goal scoring form improved from that point, going on to score seven goals in his next seven games, including scoring his first career hat-trick in a 5–3 Barnsley victory over QPR at Oakwell on 14 December. His form earned him the EFL Championship Player of the Month award for December. He became a key player during his first season at Barnsley, scoring 13 goals in 47 appearances, with 11 goals coming in the Championship. He helped Barnsley to survival on the final day of the season.

He continued to feature as a key part of Barnsley's first-team during the 2020–21 season. He scored his first goal of the season in a 3–0 win against Queens Park Rangers on 27 October. Chaplin made 39 appearances in all competitions over the course of the season, including 30 league starts, scoring 4 goals. He helped Barnsley turn their fortunes around from the previous season by helping the club qualify for the EFL Championship play-offs following a 5th placed league finish.

=== Ipswich Town ===
On 27 July 2021, Chaplin joined Ipswich Town, on a three-year deal for an officially undisclosed fee, understood to be in the region of £750,000. He made his debut for Ipswich on the opening day of the 2021–22 season in a 2–2 home draw with Morecambe at Portman Road. He scored his first goal for the club on 25 September, netting a 90th-minute equalizer in a 1–1 home draw with Sheffield Wednesday.

At the end of the 22/23 League One season, Chaplin would be awarded the Sky Bet League One Golden Boot jointly with Peterborough striker Jonson Clarke-Harris scoring 26 league goals which helped Ipswich achieve a 2nd-place finish and promotion to the Championship. Chaplin would also be included in the League One Team of the Season and awarded the Ipswich Town Player of the Season.

In June 2023, Chaplin signed a new three-year contract at the club, stating "there is nowhere else I would rather be".

In December 2024, Chaplin scored his first Premier League goal (in his 400th career appearance) in the home defeat to Bournemouth to complete the set of scoring in each of the top four English divisions.

==== Portsmouth (loan) ====
On deadline day of the 25/26 summer window, Chaplin returned to boyhood club Portsmouth on loan for the remainder of the season. His debut appearance was the South Coast Derby against Southampton.

On 15 May 2026, Ipswich Town announced Chaplin would be released at the end of his contract.

=== Leicester City ===
On 16 July 2026, Chaplin became the first signing for Leicester City following their relegation to League One.

== Career statistics ==
As of match played 2 May 2026

Appearances and goals by club, season and competition
Club	Season	League			FA Cup		League Cup		Other		Total	
Club	Season	Division	Apps	Goals	Apps	Goals	Apps	Goals	Apps	Goals	Apps	Goals
Portsmouth	2014–15	League Two	9	1	0	0	0	0	0	0	9	1
Portsmouth	2015–16	League Two	30	8	4	1	2	2	2 (Note: One appearance in Football League Trophy, one appearance in League Two play-offs)	0	38	11
Portsmouth	2016–17	League Two	39	8	1	0	1	0	1 (Note: Appearance(s) in EFL Trophy)	0	42	8
Portsmouth	2017–18	League One	26	5	1	0	1	0	4	0	32	5
Portsmouth	2018–19	League One	0	0	0	0	1	0	0	0	1	0
Portsmouth	Total		104	22	6	1	5	2	7	0	122	25
Coventry City (loan)	2018–19	League One	20	5	1	0	0	0	0	0	21	5
Coventry City	2018–19	League One	11	3	0	0	0	0	0	0	11	3
Coventry City	Total		31	8	1	0	0	0	0	0	32	8
Barnsley	2019–20	Championship	44	11	2	2	1	0	—		47	13
Barnsley	2020–21	Championship	34	4	3	0	2	0	—		39	4
Barnsley	Total		78	15	5	2	3	0	0	0	86	17
Ipswich Town	2021–22	League One	39	9	4	1	0	0	4	1	47	11
Ipswich Town	2022–23	League One	45	26	5	3	1	0	1	0	52	29
Ipswich Town	2023–24	Championship	44	13	1	0	2	0	—		47	13
Ipswich Town	2024–25	Premier League	22	1	0	0	1	1	—		23	2
Ipswich Town	2025–26	Championship	4	0	0	0	1	0	—		5	0
Ipswich Town	Total		154	49	10	4	5	1	5	1	174	55
Portsmouth (loan)	2025–26	Championship	36	2	1	0	0	0	—		37	2
Leicester City	2026–27	League One	0	0	0	0	0	0	0	0	0	0
Career total			403	96	23	7	13	3	12	1	451	107

== Honours ==
Portsmouth

- EFL League Two: 2016–17

Ipswich Town

- EFL League One runner-up: 2022–23
- EFL Championship runner-up: 2023–24, 2025–26

Individual

- EFL League One Golden Boot: 2022–23
- EFL League One Team of the Season: 2022–23
- PFA Team of the Year: 2022–23 League One
- PFA League One Player of the Year: 2022–23
- EFL Championship Player of the Month: December 2019
- EFL League One Player of the Month: December 2022, April 2023
- PFA Fans' League One Player of the Month: August 2022, September 2022
- Ipswich Town Player of the Year: 2022–23
- Ipswich Town Players' Player of the Year: 2022–23
- Ipswich Town Goal of the Season: 2022–23
- League Two Apprentice Award: 2014–15
