= Aapo Halme =

Finnish footballer (born 1998)

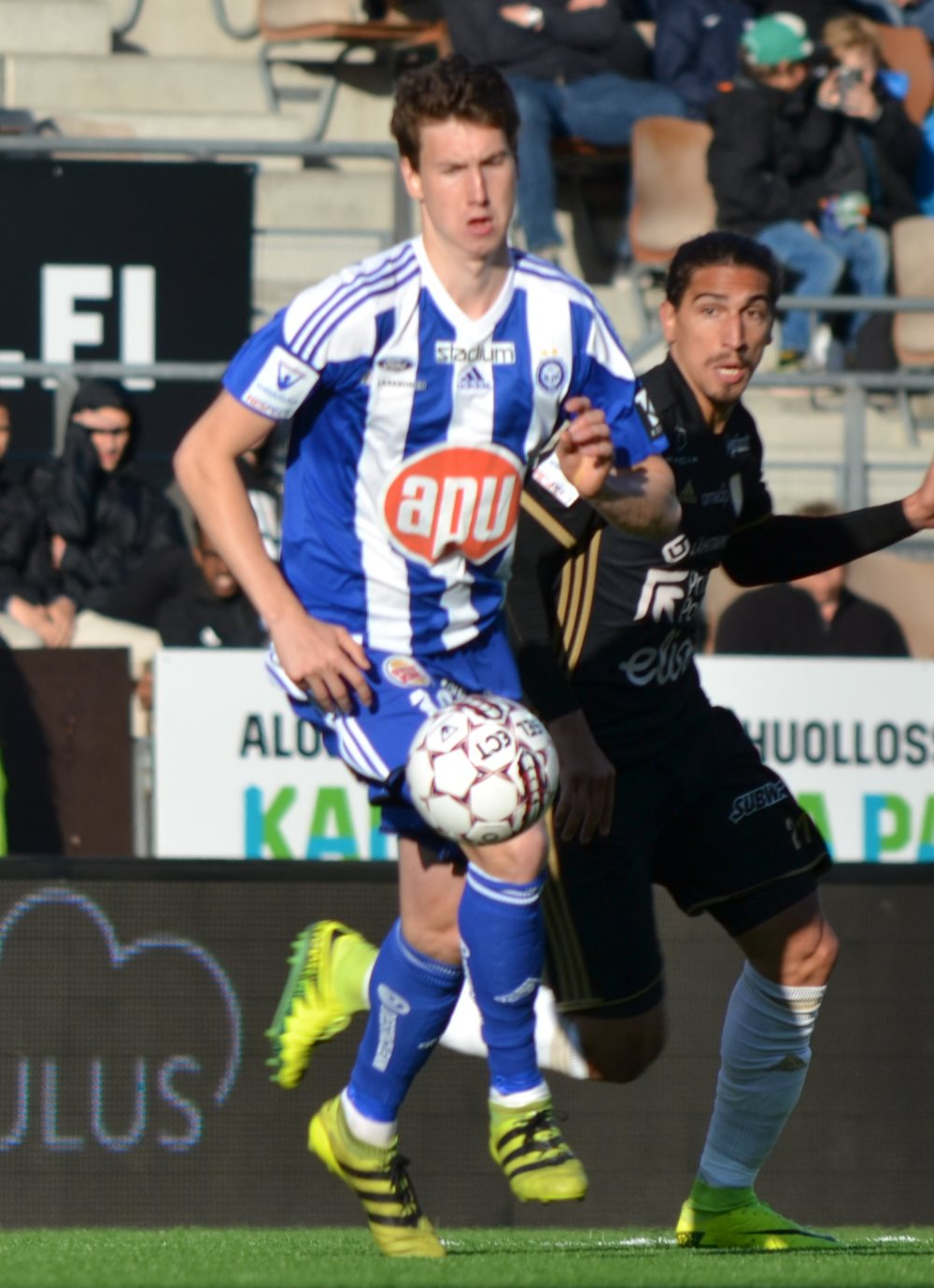
- Halme with HJK with 2017

Personal information
- Full name: Aapo Ilmari Halme
- Date of birth: 22 May 1998 (age 28)
- Place of birth: Helsinki, Finland
- Height: 1.96 m (6 ft 5 in)
- Position: Centre-back

Youth career
- 2009–2015: Honka

Senior career*
Years	Team	Apps	(Gls)
2014	Honka	1	(0)
2015	Klubi 04	15	(1)
2015–2018	HJK	29	(0)
2018–2019	Leeds United	4	(0)
2019–2022	Barnsley	55	(4)
2022–2024	HJK	27	(3)

International career^{‡}
2013–2014	Finland U16	5	(0)
2014	Finland U17	10	(1)
2015–2016	Finland U18	9	(0)
2015–2017	Finland U19	7	(0)
2017–2020	Finland U21	18	(0)
Medal record
HJK Helsinki
Third place	Veikkausliiga	2015
Second place	Finnish Cup	2016
Second place	Veikkausliiga	2016
First place	Finnish Cup	2017
First place	Veikkausliiga	2017
Leeds
Third place	EFL Championship	2019
- * Club domestic league appearances and goals as of 19 October 2024 ‡ National team caps and goals as of 23:00, 17 November 2020

Aapo Ilmari Halme (born 22 May 1998) is a Finnish professional footballer who most recently played as a centre-back for Veikkausliiga club HJK. He has also represented the Finland national under-21 football team from 2017 to 2020. Halme was born in Helsinki, Finland. He began his senior club career playing for Honka, before signing with HJK Helsinki at age 17 in 2015. He would go on to win the 2017 Veikkausliiga and 2016–17 Finnish Cup.

Formerly an international at under-16, under-17, under-18, under-19, under-20 and under-21 level. Halme was nominated to Finland's preliminary UEFA Euro 2020 team but he did not make it to the final squad.

== Club career ==
=== Early career ===
Halme started his youth career at FC Honka, making 1 senior appearance before joining Klubi-04, where he made 15 appearances and scored once.

=== HJK Helsinki ===
The winners of the 2015 Finnish League Cup HJK Helsinki brought in Halme from Klubi-04 on a three-year deal expiring at the end of the 2018 season as stated in his contractual obligation. He made 29 league appearances over three seasons with the club, scoring once.

=== Leeds United ===
On 3 January 2018, Halme signed for Leeds United on a four-year contract for an unknown fee, reported to be around £500,000. He became the fourth Finnish player to sign for Leeds after Sebastian Sorsa, Mika Väyrynen and Mikael Forssell.

However, Halme picked up a serious foot injury during one of his first training sessions at Leeds in January, which was to rule him out for the remainder of the season. After nearly nine months out injured, on 27 August 2018, Halme made his first appearance for the club representing Leeds Under 23's against Queens Park Rangers' Development squad. On 23 November 2018, Leeds' first-team head coach Marcelo Bielsa gave Halme special praise after returning from his long injury layoff. He made his debut the next day in the EFL Championship against Bristol City in a 2–0 win, after being named in the starting lineup after an injury to Pontus Jansson and long-term injuries to Luke Ayling and Gaetano Berardi.

He scored his first goal for Leeds on 6 January 2019 during a 2–1 defeat to Queens Park Rangers in the third round of the FA Cup.

Halme was regularly named as an unused substitute on the bench for the first team squad in the Championship, but still featured regularly for Carlos Corberán's under-23 side that won the 2018-19 Professional Development League Northern Section. They then became the national Professional Development League champions by beating Birmingham City in the final.

=== Barnsley ===
On 3 July 2019, Halme joined Championship club Barnsley for an undisclosed six-figure fee. He made his debut for Barnsley on 13 August in a EFL Cup match against Carlisle United. He scored his first goal for Barnsley in a 2–2 draw with Derby County on 2 October 2019.

=== Return to HJK ===
On 25 July 2022 it was announced that Halme had signed a contract with HJK until the end of 2024. He left the club after his contract expired at the end of November 2024.

== International career ==
=== Finland youth teams ===
Halme has represented Finland at U16, U17, U18 and U19 levels. He made his debut for Finland U21s on 8 June 2017 against Ukraine U21s. On 23 March 2019, Halme captained Finland U21 to an 8–3 victory against Norway U21.

=== Finland first team ===
Halme was called up for the UEFA Euro 2020 pre-tournament friendly match against Sweden on 29 May 2021 but he remained as an unused substitute.

== Career statistics ==
As of match played 25 October 2024

Appearances and goals by club, season and competition
Club	Season	League			Cup (Note: Includes Suomen Cup and FA Cup)		League cup (Note: Includes Finnish League Cup and EFL League Cup)		Continental		Total	
Club	Season	Division	Apps	Goals	Apps	Goals	Apps	Goals	Apps	Goals	Apps	Goals
Honka	2014	Veikkausliiga	1	0	0	0	0	0	0	0	1	0
Klubi 04	2015	Kakkonen	15	1	0	0	—		—		15	1
HJK	2015	Veikkausliiga	2	0	0	0	0	0	0	0	2	0
HJK	2016	Veikkausliiga	14	0	1	0	2	0	1 (Note: Appearance(s) in UEFA Europa League)	0	18	0
HJK	2017	Veikkausliiga	13	0	1	0	—		1	0	15	0
HJK	Total		29	0	2	0	2	0	2	0	35	0
Leeds United	2018–19	Championship	4	0	1	1	0	0	—		5	1
Barnsley	2019–20	Championship	32	4	1	0	1	0	—		34	4
Barnsley	2020–21	Championship	18	0	0	0	2	0	—		20	0
Barnsley	2021–22	Championship	5	0	1	0	1	0	—		7	0
Barnsley	Total		55	4	2	0	4	0	0	0	61	4
HJK	2022	Veikkausliiga	2	1	0	0	0	0	3	0	5	1
HJK	2023	Veikkausliiga	7	0	0	0	1	0	7 (Note: Appearance(s) in UEFA Champions League, UEFA Europa League and UEFA Europa Conference League)	0	15	0
HJK	2024	Veikkausliiga	18	2	0	0	0	0	5 (Note: Appearance(s) in UEFA Champions League and UEFA Conference League)	0	23	2
HJK	Total		27	3	0	0	1	0	15	0	43	3
Career total			131	8	5	1	7	0	17	0	161	9

== Honours ==
=== Club ===
HJK

- Veikkausliiga: 2017, 2022, 2023
- Finnish Cup: 2016–17
- Finnish League Cup: 2023
