= Elliot Simões =

Angolan footballer

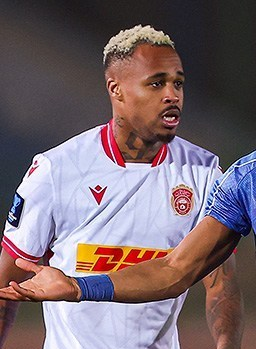
- Simões with Al-Muharraq in 2025

Personal information
- Full name: Elliot Jorge Simões Inácio
- Date of birth: 20 December 1999 (age 26)
- Place of birth: Portugal
- Position: Winger

Team information
- Current team: Al-Muharraq

Youth career
- Benfica
- Sporting CP
- 2016–2018: FC United of Manchester

Senior career*
Years	Team	Apps	(Gls)
2018–2019	FC United of Manchester	18	(0)
2019–2021	Barnsley	25	(3)
2021	→ Doncaster Rovers (loan)	8	(0)
2021–2022	Nancy	14	(0)
2021–2022	Nancy II	3	(0)
2022–2023	Salford City	8	(0)
2023–2024	Al-Qaisumah		
2025–	Al-Muharraq		

International career^{‡}
2020	Angola	1	(0)
- * Club domestic league appearances and goals as of 19:18, 2 October 2025 (UTC) ‡ National team caps and goals as of 14 October 2020

Elliot Jorge Simões Inácio (born 20 December 1999) is a professional footballer who plays as a winger for Bahraini club Al-Muharraq. Born in Portugal, he has represented the Angola national team.

Simões began his career with the youth teams of Portuguese clubs Benfica and Sporting CP, before moving to England to play with F.C. United of Manchester, where he made his senior debut. He turned professional with Barnsley in 2019, and spent time on loan with Doncaster Rovers, before moving to French club Nancy.

== Club career ==
=== Early career ===
Simões began his career with Benfica and Sporting CP. He joined F.C. United of Manchester at the age of 16, making his first-team debut in April 2018.

=== Barnsley ===
Simões signed for Barnsley in January 2019, signing a three-and-a-half-year contract. He made his senior debut for Barnsley on 19 September, appearing as a substitute for the last 10 minutes of the match. He scored his first goal for Barnsley on 2 January 2020 in a 2–1 defeat to Derby County. In January 2021 he moved on loan to Doncaster Rovers until the end of the 2020–21 season.

=== Nancy ===
In August 2021 he was signed by French club Nancy for an undisclosed fee. On 14 November, Simões made his Nancy debut in a 3–1 victory in the Coupe de France over Lorraine de Plantiéres. On 27 November, he scored his first goal for the club in the following round of the cup, in a 1–0 victory over Soleil Bischheim. He made his league debut on 5 March 2022, in a 0–1 home defeat to Grenoble Foot.

=== Salford City ===
In July 2022, he returned to England to sign a one-year contract with EFL League Two side Salford City.

=== Al-Qaisumah ===
On 12 July 2023, Simões joined Saudi First Division League club Al-Qaisumah.

=== Al-Muharraq ===
In July 2025 he signed for Bahraini club Al-Muharraq.

== International career ==
In October 2020, Simões was called up to the Angola national team. He made his debut on 13 October 2020 as a 78th minute substitution during a friendly match against Mozambique.

== Style of play ==
In 2019, Simões was described by new team Barnsley as an "exciting, direct and pacey winger".

== Career statistics ==
As of match played 8 November 2022

Appearances and goals by club, season and competition
Club	Season	League			FA Cup		League Cup		Other		Total	
Club	Season	Division	Apps	Goals	Apps	Goals	Apps	Goals	Apps	Goals	Apps	Goals
F.C. United of Manchester	2018–19	National League North	3	0	0	0	—		0	0	3	0
F.C. United of Manchester	2019–20	National League North	14	0	0	0	—		0	0	14	0
F.C. United of Manchester	Total		17	0	0	0	—		0	0	17	0
Barnsley	2019–20	Championship	17	2	1	0	0	0	—		18	2
Barnsley	2020–21	Championship	8	1	0	0	1	0	—		9	1
Barnsley	Total		25	3	1	0	1	0	0	0	27	3
Doncaster Rovers (loan)	2020–21	League One	8	0	2	0	0	0	0	0	10	0
Nancy	2021–22	Ligue 2	14	0	3	1	—		0	0	17	1
Nancy II	2021–22	Championnat National 3	3	0	0	0	—		0	0	3	0
Salford City	2022–23	League Two	8	0	0	0	0	0	3	1	11	1
Career total			77	3	6	1	1	0	3	1	85	5
