= Bambo Diaby =

Senegalese footballer (born 1997)

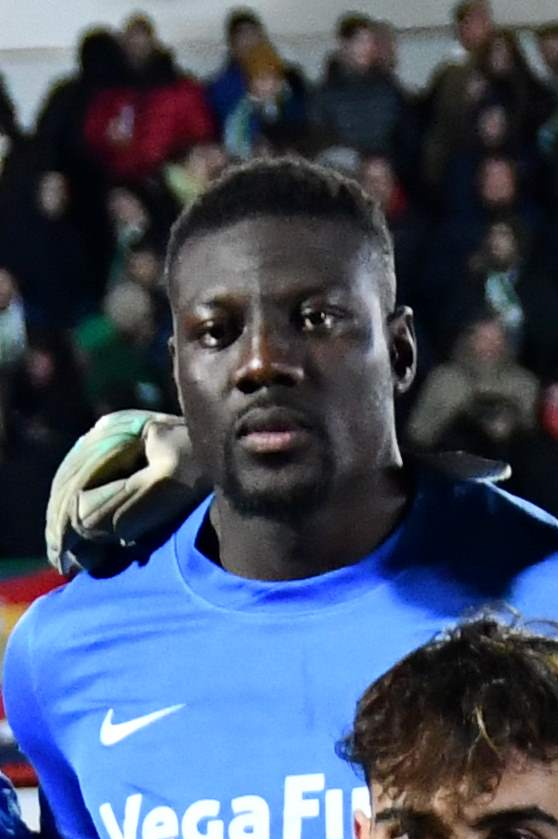
- Diaby with Elche in 2025

Personal information
- Full name: Bambo Diaby Diaby
- Date of birth: 17 December 1997 (age 28)
- Place of birth: Ziguinchor, Senegal
- Height: 1.88 m (6 ft 2 in)
- Position: Centre-back

Team information
- Current team: Elche

Youth career
- Cerdanyola
- Sánchez Llibre
- Vilassar Mar
- 2010–2013: Premià
- 2012–2013: → Badalona (loan)
- 2013–2016: Cornellà

Senior career*
Years	Team	Apps	(Gls)
2016	Cornellà	1	(0)
2016–2018	Sampdoria	0	(0)
2017	→ Mantova (loan)	7	(0)
2017–2018	→ Peralada (loan)	34	(4)
2018–2019	Lokeren	18	(1)
2019–2020	Barnsley	21	(1)
2022–2023	Preston North End	24	(0)
2023–2024	Sheffield Wednesday	34	(0)
2024–	Elche	26	(0)
2026	→ Granada (loan)	8	(0)
- * Club domestic league appearances and goals as of 9 June 2026

Bambo Diaby Diaby (born 17 December 1997) is a Senegalese footballer who plays as a centre-back for Spanish club Elche CF.

== Club career ==
=== Early career ===
Diaby was born in Senegal, but moved to Mataró, Catalonia at the age of four and went on to represent clubs of the region as a youth. He made his first team debut for UE Cornellà on 15 May 2016, coming on as a substitute in a 0–1 Segunda División B home loss against CF Reus Deportiu.

In September 2016, Diaby joined Serie A club U.C. Sampdoria, returning to the youth setup. On 1 February 2017, he was loaned to Serie C side Mantova F.C. until June.

On 28 July 2017, Diaby agreed to a one-year loan deal with Girona FC, being immediately assigned to the reserves in the third division. He made his first team debut on 28 November, replacing Carles Planas in a 1–1 away draw against Levante UD, for the season's Copa del Rey.

=== Lokeren ===
On 21 June 2018, Diaby agreed to a three-year contract with Belgian First Division A side KSC Lokeren.

=== Barnsley ===
On 5 July 2019, Diaby signed for Barnsley on a four-year contract. On 21 January 2020, it was revealed that Diaby had failed a drugs test after a game against Blackburn Rovers on 23 November 2019. On 6 October 2020 Diaby was handed a two-year ban by the FA for testing positive for the banned substance higenamine and his contract with Barnsley was subsequently terminated.

=== Preston North End ===
On 31 January 2022, Diaby joined EFL Championship club Preston North End on a short-term deal until the end of the 2021–22 season. The club entered discussions surrounding a new contract at the end of the season and on May 30 announced he had signed a new two-year deal.

=== Sheffield Wednesday ===
On 2 August 2023, Diaby joined Championship side Sheffield Wednesday for an undisclosed fee. Diaby made his Sheffield Wednesday debut in the EFL Cup against Stockport County.

=== Elche ===
On 22 August 2024, Diaby joined Elche for an undisclosed fee. A backup to starters David Affengruber and Pedro Bigas, he featured in 24 matches during the season as his side achieved promotion to La Liga.

Diaby made his debut in the Spanish top tier on 21 September 2025, coming on as a late substitute in a 1–0 home win over Oviedo. On 29 January 2026, after being rarely used, he was loaned to Granada until June.

== Career statistics ==
As of match played 7 April 2025

Club	Season	League			National Cup		League Cup		Other		Total	
Club	Season	Division	Apps	Goals	Apps	Goals	Apps	Goals	Apps	Goals	Apps	Goals
Cornellà	2015–16	Segunda División B	1	0	0	0	0	0	0	0	1	0
Sampdoria	2016–17	Serie A	0	0	0	0	0	0	0	0	0	0
Sampdoria	2017–18	Serie A	0	0	0	0	0	0	0	0	0	0
Sampdoria	Total		0	0	0	0	0	0	0	0	0	0
Mantova (loan)	2016–17	Lega Pro	7	0	0	0	0	0	0	0	7	0
Peralada (loan)	2017–18	Segunda División B	34	4	0	0	0	0	0	0	34	4
Girona (loan)	2017–18	La Liga	0	0	1	0	0	0	1	0	2	0
Lokeren	2018–19	Belgian First Division A	18	1	1	0	0	0	0	0	19	1
Barnsley	2019–20	EFL Championship	21	1	1	0	0	0	0	0	22	1
Preston North End	2021–22	EFL Championship	7	0	0	0	0	0	0	0	7	0
Preston North End	2022–23	EFL Championship	17	0	1	1	0	0	0	0	18	1
Preston North End	Total		24	0	1	1	0	0	0	0	25	1
Sheffield Wednesday	2023–24	EFL Championship	34	0	0	0	1	0	0	0	35	0
Sheffield Wednesday	2024–25	EFL Championship	0	0	0	0	1	0	0	0	1	0
Sheffield Wednesday	Total		34	0	0	0	2	0	0	0	36	0
Elche	2024–25	Segunda División	22	0	2	0	0	0	0	0	24	0
Career total			161	6	6	1	2	0	0	0	170	7
