= Chris Sang =

English footballer

Personal information
- Full name: Christopher Sang
- Date of birth: 29 June 1999 (age 27)
- Place of birth: Liverpool, England
- Height: 6 ft 2 in (1.88 m)
- Position: Forward

Youth career
- Wigan Athletic

Senior career*
Years	Team	Apps	(Gls)
2017–2019	Bury	3	(0)
2017	→ Southport (loan)	9	(3)
2018	→ Marine (loan)	6	(0)
2018–2019	→ Altrincham (loan)	5	(0)
2019–2020	Barnsley	0	(0)
2019–2020	→ Guiseley (loan)	10	(4)
2020–2021	Marshalls FC		
2021	Wrexham	3	(0)
2021–2022	Bala Town	13	(1)
2022–	Nantwich Town	0	(0)
- * Club domestic league appearances and goals as of 19:55, 4 February 2022 (UTC)

Christopher Neil Sang (born 29 June 1999) is an English professional footballer who plays as a forward for Nantwich Town.

== Club career ==
A product of Wigan Athletic's youth setup, Sang was signed on a two-year deal by Bury on 8 July 2017 after being Wigan Athletic's U18's leading scorer with 22 goals in 30 games during his first year scholarship. That season saw Wigan Athletic U18 reach their first ever FA Youth Cup quarter final where they were narrowly beaten by Manchester City. On 25 August, he was loaned to Southport until 2 January.

Sang made his senior debut on 28 August 2017, starting in a 2–1 away loss against Salford City, and scored his first goal on 2 September in a 2–0 home win against Darlington. On 8 November, after one goal in nine matches, he was recalled.

Sang made his League One debut on 18 November 2017, coming on as a substitute for Harry Bunn in a 3–0 home loss against Blackburn Rovers. He made his full debut on 8 November 2017 in the EFL Trophy in a 3–1 win against Stoke City U23, posting an assist in a Man of the Match performance.

On 5 October 2018, Sang signed a one-month loan deal with Marine FC.

In December 2018 he joined Altrincham on a one-month loan deal. He made five appearances during his time with the club.

=== Barnsley ===
On 8 July 2019 Sang signed for Barnsley after a successful trial. On 21 December, Sang joined Guiseley on loan for one month. The deal was later extended until 27 February 2020 and once again later, until the end of the season. Sang was released from Barnsley at the end of the 2019–20 season.

=== Wrexham ===
After a spell with Marshalls FC in the West Cheshire League, on 10 April 2021, Sang was one of three players to join Wrexham on a non-contract basis.

=== Bala Town ===
In August 2021, Sang joined Cymru Premier side Bala Town. On 3 February 2022, Sang left the club by mutual consent.

=== Nantwich Town ===
On 1 October 2022, Sang signed for Northern Premier League Premier Division club Nantwich Town.
