= 2015–16 Barnsley F.C. season =

Barnsley F.C.
2015–16 season
- Owner: Patrick Cryne
- Chairman: Maurice Watkins
- Manager: Lee Johnson (until 6 February 2016); Tommy Wright (from 6 February 2016–13 February 2016); Paul Heckingbottom (caretaker, from 13 February 2016–present)
- Stadium: Oakwell
- League One: 6th (promoted via playoffs)
- FA Cup: First round (eliminated by Altrincham)
- League Cup: Second round (eliminated by Everton)
- FL Trophy: Winners
- Top goalscorer: League: Sam Winnall (21); All: Sam Winnall (24)
Home colours	Away colours

The 2015–16 season was Barnsley's second consecutive season in League One following their relegation from the Championship in the 2013–14 season. Along with League One, the club also competed in the FA Cup, League Cup and Football League Trophy. The season covered the period from 1 July 2015 to 30 June 2016.

Barnsley were promoted to the Football League Championship, after beating Millwall 3–1 in the play-off final. Barnsley also won the Football League Trophy, after beating Oxford United 3–2 in the final.

== Squad ==
No.	Name	Pos.	Nat.	Place of Birth	Age	Apps	Goals	Signed from	Date signed	Fee	Contract End
Goalkeepers
1	Adam Davies	GK	(England)	Rinteln	34	75	0	Sheffield Wednesday	13 June 2014	Free	2018
13	Nick Townsend	GK	(England)	Solihull	32	10	0	Birmingham City	1 September 2015	Undisclosed	2018
23	Jack Walton	GK	(England)		28	0	0	Academy	1 July 2015	Trainee	2018
Defenders
2	James Bree	RB/RW	(England)	Wakefield	29	40	0	Academy	1 January 2014	Trainee	2017
3	George Smith	LB	(England)	Barnsley	30	44	0	Academy	1 July 2014	Trainee	2016
4	Marc Roberts	CB	(England)	Barnsley	36	42	1	FC Halifax Town	1 July 2015	Free	2018
5	Lewin Nyatanga	CB	(Wales)	Burton upon Trent	38	144	10	Bristol City	9 July 2013	Free	2017
22	George Williams	RB	(England)	Hillingdon	33	27	1	Worcester City	22 December 2014	Undisclosed	2016
26	Alfie Mawson	CB	(England)	Hillingdon	32	59	7	Brentford	1 July 2015	Free	2018
28	Jack Cowgill	CB	(England)	Wakefield	29	2	0	Academy	1 July 2014	Trainee	2017
29	Matty Templeton	LB	(England)	Worksop	30	3	1	Academy	1 July 2015	Trainee	2017
35	Aidan White	LB	(England)	Otley	35	19	0	Rotherham United	January 2016	Free	2017
36	Callum Evans	DF	(England)		31	0	0	Manchester United	29 April 2016	Free	2017
Midfielders
7	Josh Scowen	CM	(England)	Enfield	33	64	8	Wycobme Wanderers	15 January 2015	Undisclosed	2017
8	Conor Hourihane	CM	(Republic of Ireland)	County Cork	35	107	25	Plymouth Argyle	23 June 2014	£200,000	2017
10	Ryan Williams	WG	(Australia)	Subiaco	33	13	0	Fulham	26 July 2015	Undisclosed	2017
11	Josh Brownhill	CM	(England)	Warrington	20	27	3	Preston North End	14 January 2016	Loan	2016
14	Paul Digby	CM	(England)	Sheffield	31	25	0	Academy	1 August 2011	Trainee	2017
15	Marley Watkins	WG	(England)	London	36	42	8	Inverness CT	1 July 2015	Free	2017
17	Brad Abbott	CM	(England)	Doncaster	31	9	0	Academy	1 July 2013	Trainee	2016
19	Otis Khan	MF	(Pakistan)	Ashton-under-Lyne	31	3	0	Sheffield United	25 January 2016	Free	2017
20	Adam Hammill	RW	(England)	Liverpool	38	118	22	Free agent	9 November 2015	Free	2018
32	Harry Chapman	WG	(England)	Hartlepool	18	14	1	Middlesbrough	26 February 2016	Loan	2016
34	Lloyd Isgrove	LW	(Wales)	Yeovil	23	36	1	Southampton	23 October 2015	Loan	2016
Forwards
9	Sam Winnall	CF	(England)	Wolverhampton	35	93	37	Scunthorpe United	23 July 2014	Undisclosed	2017
18	Ashley Fletcher	CF	(England)	Keighley	31	27	9	Manchester United	7 January 2016	Loan	2016
24	Ivan Toney	CF	(England)	Northampton	20	20	2	Newcastle United	24 March 2016	Loan	2016
25	Shaun Tuton	CF	(England)	Sheffield	34	7	0	FC Halifax Town	1 February 2016	Undisclosed	2017

=== Statistics ===
As of 24 June 2016

No.	Pos	Nat	Player	Total		League		FA Cup		League Cup		League Trophy	
No.	Pos	Nat	Player	Apps	Goals	Apps	Goals	Apps	Goals	Apps	Goals	Apps	Goals
1	GK	(England) ENG	Adam Davies	46	0	38+0	0	1+0	0	1+0	0	6+0	0
2	DF	(England) ENG	James Bree	24	0	17+2	0	0+0	0	1+0	0	1+3	0
3	DF	(England) ENG	George Smith	25	0	14+5	0	1+0	0	1+1	0	3+0	0
4	DF	(England) ENG	Marc Roberts	38	1	28+5	1	1+0	0	2+0	0	1+1	0
5	DF	(Wales) WAL	Lewin Nyatanga	28	3	19+2	2	1+0	0	2+0	0	4+0	1
7	MF	(England) ENG	Josh Scowen	39	5	24+9	4	1+0	0	2+0	1	2+1	0
8	MF	(Republic of Ireland) IRL	Conor Hourihane	50	11	40+1	10	0+1	0	1+1	0	6+0	1
9	FW	(England) ENG	Sam Winnall	53	22	36+7	21	1+0	0	1+1	1	6+1	0
10	MF	(Australia) AUS	Ryan Williams	6	0	1+4	0	0+0	0	0+0	0	1+0	0
11	MF	(England) ENG	Josh Brownhill (on loan from Preston North End)	23	2	20+1	2	0+0	0	0+0	0	2+0	0
13	GK	(England) ENG	Nick Townsend	10	0	8+0	0	0+0	0	1+0	0	1+0	0
14	MF	(England) ENG	Paul Digby	3	0	1+0	0	0+0	0	0+0	0	0+2	0
15	MF	(England) ENG	Marley Watkins	41	8	32+2	5	1+0	0	2+0	1	4+0	2
16	FW	(England) ENG	George Maris	2	0	0+1	0	1+0	0	0+0	0	0+0	0
17	MF	(England) ENG	Brad Abbott	1	0	0+0	0	0+0	0	0+0	0	1+0	0
18	FW	(England) ENG	Ashley Fletcher (on loan from Manchester United)	24	7	12+9	5	0+0	0	0+0	0	1+2	2
19	MF	(Pakistan) PAK	Otis Khan	3	0	0+3	0	0+0	0	0+0	0	0+0	0
20	MF	(England) ENG	Adam Hammill	30	8	25+0	5	0+0	0	0+0	0	5+0	3
22	DF	(England) ENG	George Williams	20	1	16+3	1	0+0	0	0+0	0	1+0	0
24	FW	(England) ENG	Ivan Toney (on loan from Newcastle United)	15	2	10+2	1	0+0	0	0+0	0	2+1	1
25	FW	(England) ENG	Shaun Tuton	5	0	0+5	0	0+0	0	0+0	0	0+0	0
26	DF	(England) ENG	Alfie Mawson	56	7	46+0	6	1+0	0	2+0	0	7+0	1
29	DF	(England) ENG	Matty Templeton	3	1	0+2	1	0+0	0	0+1	0	0+0	0
32	MF	(England) ENG	Harry Chapman (on loan from Middlesbrough)	9	1	3+5	1	0+0	0	0+0	0	0+1	0
34	MF	(Wales) WAL	Lloyd Isgrove (on loan from Southampton)	32	0	27+0	0	0+1	0	0+0	0	4+0	0
35	DF	(England) ENG	Aidan White	18	0	14+0	0	0+0	0	0+0	0	4+0	0
Players who returned to their parent club:
6	DF	(England) ENG	Callum Connolly (on loan from Everton)	3	0	3+0	0	0+0	0	0+0	0	0+0	0
6	DF	(Republic of Ireland) IRL	Kevin Long (on loan from Burnley)	13	2	11+0	2	0+0	0	0+0	0	2+0	0
12	FW	(England) ENG	Michael Smith (on loan from Swindon Town)	13	0	4+9	0	0+0	0	0+0	0	0+0	0
18	FW	(Republic of Ireland) IRL	Conor Wilkinson (on loan from Bolton Wanderers)	12	1	2+6	1	0+1	0	1+1	0	0+1	0
19	MF	(England) ENG	Ben Pearson (on loan from Manchester United)	29	2	23+0	1	1+0	0	2+0	0	3+0	1
20	MF	(England) ENG	Joe Rothwell (on loan from Manchester United)	7	0	2+2	0	0+0	0	1+1	0	1+0	0
21	MF	(England) ENG	Daniel Crowley (on loan from Arsenal)	13	1	6+5	0	0+0	0	1+0	1	1+0	0
27	MF	(England) ENG	Kadeem Harris (on loan from Cardiff City)	13	0	7+4	0	0+0	0	0+0	0	2+0	0
Players who left the club:
11	FW	(Canada) CAN	Simeon Jackson	10	0	1+8	0	0+0	0	0+0	0	1+0	0
30	FW	(England) ENG	Harry White	2	0	0+0	0	0+0	0	0+0	0	0+2	0
32	DF	(England) ENG	Reece Wabara	26	1	18+1	1	1+0	0	1+0	0	5+0	0

==== Play-off Appearances ====
No.	Pos	Nat	Player	Total		Play-offs	
No.	Pos	Nat	Player	Apps	Goals	Apps	Goals
1	GK	(England) ENG	Adam Davies	3	0	3+0	0
4	DF	(England) ENG	Marc Roberts	3	0	3+0	0
7	MF	(England) ENG	Josh Scowen	3	0	3+0	0
8	MF	(Republic of Ireland) IRL	Conor Hourihane	3	0	3+0	0
9	FW	(England) ENG	Sam Winnall	3	2	3+0	2
11	MF	(England) ENG	Josh Brownhill	3	1	3+0	1
12	MF	(England) ENG	Pat McCourt	1	0	0+1	0
15	MF	(England) ENG	Marley Watkins	1	0	0+1	0
18	FW	(England) ENG	Ashley Fletcher	3	2	3+0	2
20	MF	(England) ENG	Adam Hammill	3	2	3+0	2
22	DF	(England) ENG	George Williams	3	0	3+0	0
24	FW	(England) ENG	Ivan Toney	3	0	0+3	0
26	DF	(England) ENG	Alfie Mawson	3	0	3+0	0
30	FW	(England) ENG	Harry White	1	0	0+1	0
32	MF	(England) ENG	Harry Chapman	2	0	0+2	0
34	MF	(Wales) WAL	Lloyd Isgrove	3	1	3+0	1

==== Goals record ====
As of 24 June 2016

Rank	No.	Po.	Name	League One	FA Cup	League Cup	League Trophy	Play-offs	Total
1	9	FW	(England) Sam Winnall	22	0	1	0	2	25
2	8	MF	(Republic of Ireland) Conor Hourihane	10	0	0	1	0	11
3	18	FW	(England) Ashley Fletcher	5	0	0	2	2	9
3	20	MF	(England) Adam Hammill	4	0	0	3	2	9
5	15	MF	(England) Marley Watkins	5	0	1	2	0	8
6	26	DF	(England) Alfie Mawson	6	0	0	1	0	7
7	7	MF	(England) Josh Scowen	4	0	1	0	0	5
8	5	DF	(Wales) Lewin Nyatanga	2	0	0	1	0	3
8	11	MF	(England) Josh Brownhill	2	0	0	0	1	3
10	~~6~~	DF	(Republic of Ireland) Kevin Long	2	0	0	0	0	2
10	~~19~~	MF	(England) Ben Pearson	1	0	0	1	0	2
10	24	FW	(England) Ivan Toney	1	0	0	1	0	2
13	4	DF	(England) Marc Roberts	1	0	0	0	0	1
13	~~18~~	FW	(Republic of Ireland) Conor Wilkinson	1	0	0	0	0	1
13	~~21~~	MF	(England) Daniel Crowley	0	0	1	0	0	1
13	22	DF	(England) George Williams	1	0	0	0	0	1
13	29	DF	(England) Matty Templeton	1	0	0	0	0	1
13	~~32~~	MF	(England) Reece Wabara	1	0	0	0	0	1
13	32	MF	(England) Harry Chapman	1	0	0	0	0	1
13	34	MF	(Wales) Lloyd Isgrove	0	0	0	0	1	1
Own Goals				1	0	0	1	1	3
Total				66	0	4	12	9	91

==== Disciplinary record ====
As of 24 June 2016

No.	Po.	Name	League One		FA Cup		League Cup		League Trophy		Play-offs		Total	
No.	Po.	Name	Yellow card	Red card	Yellow card	Red card	Yellow card	Red card	Yellow card	Red card	Yellow card	Red card	Yellow card	Red card
2	DF	(England) James Bree	1	0	0	0	0	0	0	0	0	0	1	0
3	DF	(England) George Smith	1	0	0	0	0	0	0	0	0	0	1	0
4	DF	(England) Marc Roberts	3	0	0	0	1	0	0	0	1	0	5	0
5	DF	(Wales) Lewin Nyatanga	1	0	0	0	0	0	0	0	0	0	1	0
~~6~~	DF	(England) Callum Connolly	1	0	0	0	0	0	0	0	0	0	1	0
~~6~~	DF	(Republic of Ireland) Kevin Long	2	1	0	0	0	0	0	0	0	0	2	1
7	MF	(England) Josh Scowen	9	0	0	0	0	0	0	0	0	0	9	0
8	MF	(Republic of Ireland) Conor Hourihane	10	0	0	0	0	0	1	0	0	0	11	0
9	FW	(England) Sam Winnall	6	0	0	0	1	0	3	0	0	0	10	0
10	MF	(Australia) Ryan Williams	0	0	0	0	0	0	1	0	0	0	1	0
11	MF	(England) Josh Brownhill	2	0	0	0	0	0	1	0	0	0	3	0
13	GK	(England) Nick Townsend	1	0	0	0	0	0	0	0	0	0	1	0
14	MF	(England) Paul Digby	1	0	0	0	0	0	0	0	0	0	1	0
15	MF	(England) Marley Watkins	7	0	1	0	0	0	1	0	0	0	9	0
~~18~~	FW	(Republic of Ireland) Conor Wilkinson	4	0	0	0	0	0	0	0	0	0	4	0
18	FW	(England) Ashley Fletcher	2	0	0	0	0	0	0	0	0	0	2	0
~~19~~	MF	(England) Ben Pearson	6	0	0	0	1	0	2	0	0	0	9	0
20	MF	(England) Adam Hammill	4	1	0	0	0	0	2	0	1	0	7	1
~~21~~	MF	(England) Daniel Crowley	2	0	0	0	0	0	0	0	0	0	2	0
22	DF	(England) George Williams	0	0	0	0	0	0	0	0	1	0	1	0
24	FW	(England) Ivan Toney	1	0	0	0	0	0	2	0	0	0	3	0
26	DF	(England) Alfie Mawson	2	0	0	0	1	0	0	0	0	0	3	0
~~27~~	MF	(England) Kadeem Harris	1	0	0	0	0	0	0	0	0	0	1	0
~~32~~	DF	(England) Reece Wabara	5	0	0	0	0	0	1	0	0	0	6	0
34	MF	(Wales) Lloyd Isgrove	2	0	0	0	0	0	0	0	0	0	2	0
35	DF	(England) Aidan White	4	0	0	0	0	0	0	0	0	0	4	0
Total			77	2	1	0	4	0	14	0	3	0	99	2

=== Contracts ===
No.	Pos.	Nat.	Name	Age	Status	Contract length	Expiry date	Source
16	FW	(England)	George Maris	19	Signed	1 year	June 2016	Barnsley FC
1	GK	(England)	Adam Davies	22	Extended	2 years	June 2018	BBC Sport
5	DF	(Wales)	Lewin Nyatanga	26	Signed	2 years	June 2017	BBC Sport
20	MF	(England)	Adam Hammill	27	Signed	6 months	June 2016	BBC Sport
28	DF	(England)	Jack Cowgill	19	Extended	1 year	June 2017	Barnsley FC
36	DF	(England)	Callum Evans	18	Extended	1 year	June 2017	Barnsley FC
20	MF	(England)	Adam Hammill	28	Signed	2 years	June 2018	BBC Sport
3	DF	(England)	George Smith	19	Withdrawn	Undisclosed	June 2016	Barnsley FC
22	DF	(England)	George Williams	23	Withdrawn	Undisclosed	June 2016	Barnsley FC
35	DF	(England)	Aidan White	24	Signed	1 year	June 2017	BBC Sport

== Transfers ==
=== Transfers in ===
Date from	Position	Nationality	Name	From	Fee	Ref.
1 July 2015	CB	ENG	Alfie Mawson	Brentford	Free transfer	
1 July 2015	CB	ENG	Marc Roberts	FC Halifax Town	Free transfer	
1 July 2015	LM	ENG	Marley Watkins	Inverness Caledonian Thistle	Free transfer	
25 July 2015	AM	AUS	Ryan Williams	Fulham	Undisclosed	
15 August 2015	RB	ENG	Reece Wabara	Doncaster Rovers	Free transfer	
1 September 2015	GK	ENG	Nick Townsend	Birmingham City	Undisclosed	
1 September 2015	ST	ENG	Harry White	Gloucester City	Undisclosed	
3 September 2015	CF	CAN	Simeon Jackson	Coventry City	Free transfer	
7 November 2015	RW	ENG	Adam Hammill	Free agent	Free transfer	
8 January 2016	RB	(England)	Aidan White	Rotherham United	Free transfer	
1 February 2016	MF	ENG	Charlie Harris	Brighton & Hove Albion	Undisclosed	
1 February 2016	CF	ENG	Shaun Tuton	FC Halifax Town	Undisclosed	
1 February 2016	MF	ENG	Josh Kay	AFC Fylde	Undisclosed	
18 May 2016	CF	ENG	Stefan Payne	Dover Athletic	Undisclosed	
21 June 2016	AM	ENG	George Moncur	Colchester United	£500,000	
25 June 2016	CF	ENG	Elliot Lee	West Ham United	Undisclosed	

=== Transfers out ===
Date from	Position	Nationality	Name	To	Fee	Ref.
1 July 2015	CM	ENG	Luke Berry	Cambridge United	Undisclosed	
1 July 2015	AM	ENG	Nana Boakye-Yiadom	Free agent	Released	
1 July 2015	CB	ENG	Martin Cranie	Huddersfield Town (Note: Following Cranie's release he joined Huddersfield Town.)	Free transfer	
1 July 2015	CF	ENG	Kane Hemmings	Dundee (Note: Following Hemmings' release he joined Dundee.)	Free transfer	
1 July 2015	CF	ENG	Dale Jennings	Milton Keynes Dons (Note: Following Jennings' release he joined Milton Keynes Dons.)	Free transfer	
1 July 2015	CF	ENG	Leroy Lita	AO Chania (Note: Following Lita's release he joined AO Chania.)	Released	
1 July 2015	CM	NIR	Darren McKnight	Shrewsbury Town	Free transfer	
1 July 2015	CB	FRA	Jean-Yves Mvoto	Free agent	Released	
1 July 2015	CB	ENG	Rhys Oates	Hartlepool United (Note: Following Oates' release he joined Hartlepool United.)	Free transfer	
15 July 2015	GK	ENG	Ross Turnbull	Leeds United	Free transfer	
16 July 2015	RW	SVK	Milan Lalkovič	Walsall	Free transfer	
23 July 2015	CM	ENG	James Bailey	Pune City	Free transfer	
13 August 2015	RB	ENG	Mason Holgate	Everton	£2,000,000	
1 January 2016	RB	ENG	Reece Wabara	Wigan Athletic	Free transfer	(Note: Following the end of Wabara's contract, he joined Wigan Athletic.)
7 January 2016	CF	ENG	Mike Phenix	Southport	Free transfer	
18 February 2016	GK	WAL	Christian Dibble	Chelmsford City	Free transfer	
14 June 2016	CF	ENG	Harry White	Solihull Moors	Undisclosed	

Total income: ▲£2,000,000

=== Loans in ===
Date from	Position	Nationality	Name	From	Date until	Ref.
10 July 2015	CF	IRL	Conor Wilkinson	Bolton Wanderers	4 January 2016	
18 July 2015	CM	ENG	Ben Pearson	Manchester United	3 January 2016	
18 July 2015	CM	ENG	Joe Rothwell	Manchester United	13 October 2016	
31 July 2015	AM	ENG	Daniel Crowley	Arsenal	30 October 2015	
4 August 2015	GK	ENG	Nick Townsend	Birmingham City	1 September 2015 (Note: On 1 September 2015, Townsend joined permanently.)	
22 August 2015	MF	ENG	Kadeem Harris	Cardiff City	23 November 2015	
1 September 2015	CF	ENG	Michael Smith	Swindon Town	4 January 2016	
24 October 2015	LW	WAL	Lloyd Isgrove	Southampton	End of Season	
7 November 2015	CF	ENG	Ivan Toney	Newcastle United	18 December 2015	
17 November 2015	LB	ENG	Aidan White	Rotherham United	3 January 2016	(Note: On 8 January 2016, White joined permanently.)
19 November 2015	CB	IRL	Kevin Long	Burnley	19 February 2016	
7 January 2016	CF	ENG	Ashley Fletcher	Manchester United	End of Season	
14 January 2016	CM	ENG	Josh Brownhill	Preston North End	End of Season	
26 February 2016	WG	ENG	Harry Chapman	Middlesbrough	End of Season	
24 March 2016	CF	ENG	Ivan Toney	Newcastle United	End of Season	

=== Loans out ===
Date from	Position	Nationality	Name	To	Date until	Ref.
11 August 2015	ST	ENG	Mike Phenix	Southport	3 January 2016	
18 August 2015	RB	ENG	George Williams	Barrow	19 November 2015	
28 August 2015	GK	WAL	Christian Dibble	Chelmsford City	28 November 2015	(Note: On 24 September 2015, Dibble's loan at Chelmsford was extended until 28 November 2015.)
22 September 2015	CF	ENG	George Maris	Guiseley	24 October 2015	
4 January 2016	CM	ENG	Paul Digby	Ipswich Town	End of Season	
9 January 2016	LB	ENG	George Smith	Crawley Town	February 2016	
1 February 2016	CF	ENG	Harry White	Kidderminster Harriers	End of Season	
1 February 2016	CF	ENG	George Maris	Lincoln City	End of Season	

== Competitions ==
=== Pre-season friendlies ===
11 July 2015 Friendly	Stalybridge Celtic	0–1	Barnsley	Stalybridge
15:00 BST		Report	Chalmers 60' (o.g.)	Stadium: Bower Fold

14 July 2015 Friendly	Guiseley	0–0	Barnsley	Guiseley
19:00 BST		Report		Stadium: Nethermoor Park

18 July 2015 Bobby Hassell Testimonial	Barnsley	4–3	Mansfield Town XI	Barnsley
15:00 BST	Hassell 7' (pen.); Ball 37'; Rothwell 67'; Nardiello 83'	Report	Green 9'; Lambe 30'; Westcarr 85'	Stadium: Oakwell; Referee: David Coote

21 July 2015 Friendly	Kilmarnock	0–1	Barnsley	Kilmarnock, Scotland
19:00 BST		Report	Wilkinson 54'	Stadium: Rugby Park; Referee: Don Robertson

24 July 2015 Friendly	Barton Town Old Boys	1–0	Barnsley XI	Barton-upon-Humber
19:00 BST	Phillips	Report		Stadium: The Euronics Ground

28 July 2015 Friendly	Frickley Athletic	1–0	Barnsley XI	South Elmsall
19:00 BST	Thomas 16'	Report		Stadium: Westfield Lane; Referee: Luke Watson

29 July 2015 Friendly	Barnsley	0–4	Middlesbrough	Barnsley
19:00 BST		Report	Kike 47', 74'; Adomah 49', 66'	Stadium: Oakwell; Referee: Darren England

1 August 2015 Friendly	Barnsley	2–1	Huddersfield Town	Barnsley
15:00 BST	Winnall 33'; Holgate 47'	Report	Wells 20'	Stadium: Oakwell; Attendance: 2,787 (647 Huddersfield); Referee: Ross Joyce

=== Football League One ===
==== League table ====
Pos	Team	Pld	W	D	L	GF	GA	GD	Pts	Promotion, qualification or relegation
4	Millwall	46	24	9	13	73	49	+24	81	Qualification for the League One play-offs (Note: Four teams play for one spot and promotion to Football League Championship.)
5	Bradford City	46	23	11	12	55	40	+15	80	Qualification for the League One play-offs
6	Barnsley (O, P)	46	22	8	16	70	54	+16	74	Qualification for the League One play-offs
7	Scunthorpe United	46	21	11	14	60	47	+13	74	
8	Coventry City	46	19	12	15	67	49	+18	69	

Updated to match(es) played on 1 July 2016. Source: BBC Sport
Rules for classification: 1) Points; 2) Goal difference; 3) Number of goals scored
(O) Play-off winners; (P) Promoted

==== Matches ====
8 August 2015 1	Chesterfield	3–1	Barnsley	Chesterfield
15:00 BST	Evatt (yellow card) 35'; O'Shea 49'; Ebanks-Blake 72'; Morsy 73'; Hird (yellow card) 77'	Report	Wilkinson 4'; (yellow card) 37'	Stadium: Proact Stadium; Attendance: 8,117; Referee: Andy Woolmer

15 August 2015 2	Barnsley	1–0	Burton Albion	Barnsley
15:00 BST	Scowen (yellow card) 50'; Hourihane 67' (pen.)	Report	Naylor (yellow card) 28'	Stadium: Oakwell; Attendance: 8,583; Referee: Jeremy Simpson

18 August 2015 3	Millwall	2–3	Barnsley	London
19:45 BST	Onyedinma 26', 83'	BBC Report	38' Winnall; 56' Mawson; 90' Nyatanga	Stadium: New Den; Attendance: 7,657; Referee: Dean Whitestone

22 August 2015 4	Barnsley	0–0	Bradford City	Barnsley
15:00 BST		BBC Report		Stadium: Oakwell; Attendance: 10,342; Referee: Eddie Ilderton

29 August 2015 5	Rochdale	3–0	Barnsley	Rochdale
15:00 BST	Andrew 8'; Vincenti 36'; Henderson 63'	Report		Stadium: Spotland; Attendance: 3,618; Referee: Gary Sutton

5 September 2015 6	Barnsley	1–2	Shrewsbury Town	Barnsley
15:00 BST	Winnall 38'	Report	6' Ellis; 90' Clark	Stadium: Oakwell; Attendance: 8,630; Referee: Stuart Atwell

12 September 2015 7	Barnsley	4–1	Swindon Town	Barnsley
15:00 BST	Watkins 22'; Wabara 44'; Nyatanga 59'; Hourihane 76'	Report	Nyatanga 20' (o.g.)	Stadium: Oakwell; Attendance: 8,227; Referee: Darren Bond

19 September 2015 8	Blackpool	1–1	Barnsley	Blackpool
15:00 BST	Redshaw 55'	Report	Hourihane 8'	Stadium: Bloomfield Road; Attendance: 7,542; Referee: Chris Kavanagh

26 September 2015 9	Barnsley	2–0	Gillingham	Barnsley
15:00 BST	Pearson 18'; Winnall 45'	Report		Stadium: Oakwell; Attendance: 8,354; Referee: Darren Deadman

3 October 2015 10	Doncaster Rovers	2–1	Barnsley	Doncaster
15:00 BST	Anderson 35'; Chaplow 90+1'	Report	Winnall 60'	Stadium: Keepmoat Stadium; Attendance: 9,033; Referee: Lee Mason

10 October 2015 11	Barnsley	1–2	Crewe Alexandra	Barnsley
15:00 BST	Mawson 16'	Report	Colclough 14'; Dalla Valle 79'	Stadium: Oakwell; Attendance: 8,406; Referee: Mark Brown

17 October 2015 12	Southend United	2–1	Barnsley	Southend-on-Sea
15:00 BST	Wordsworth 36'; Prosser 43'	Report	Scowen 24' (pen.)	Stadium: Roots Hall; Attendance: 6,572; Referee: Charles Breakspear

20 October 2015 13	Barnsley	0–2	Walsall	Barnsley
19:45 BST		Report	Evans 62'; Lalkovič 70'	Stadium: Oakwell; Attendance: 8,561; Referee: Scott Duncan (referee)

24 October 2015 14	Barnsley	0–1	Fleetwood Town	Barnsley
15:00 BST		Report	Procter 29'	Stadium: Oakwell; Attendance: 8,764; Referee: Carl Boyeson

31 October 2015 15	Scunthorpe United	2–0	Barnsley	Scunthorpe
15:00 GMT	Hopper 6'; McSheffrey 41'	Report		Stadium: Glanford Park; Attendance: 4,147; Referee: Stuart Attwell

3 November 2015 16	Coventry City	4–3	Barnsley	Coventry
19:45 GMT	Kent 3'; Armstrong 18' 52'; Cole 60'	Report	Mawson 48'; Scowen 54' 90+6' (pen.)	Stadium: Ricoh Arena; Attendance: 10,954; Referee: Michael Bull

14 November 2015 17	Barnsley	1–2	Port Vale	Barnsley
15:00 GMT	Winnall 77'	Report	Leitch-Smith 40'; Foley 47'	Stadium: Oakwell; Attendance: 8,696; Referee: Tony Harrington

21 November 2015 18	Oldham Athletic	1–2	Barnsley	Oldham
15:00 GMT	Yeates 78'	Report	Hourihane 30'; Long 89'	Stadium: Boundary Park; Attendance: 4,300; Referee: Graham Salisbury

24 November 2015 19	Peterborough United	3–2	Barnsley	Peterborough
19:45 GMT	Angol 24'; Addison 62'; Maddison 73'	BBC Report	Conor Hourihane 38' (pen.); Winnall 77'; Long (red card) 83'	Stadium: ABAX Stadium; Attendance: 4,783; Referee: Nick Kinseley

28 November 2015 20	Barnsley	1–1	Sheffield United	Barnsley
12:15 GMT	Hourihane 90+5'	Report	Basham 14'	Stadium: Oakwell; Attendance: 13,571; Referee: Neil Swarbrick

12 December 2015 21	Colchester United	2–3	Barnsley	Colchester
15:00 GMT	Moncur 67'; Porter 70'	Report	18' Hourihane; 40' Hammill; 60' Toney	Stadium: Weston Homes Community Stadium; Attendance: 3,265; Referee: Steve Martin

19 December 2015 22	Barnsley	0–2	Wigan Athletic	Barnsley
15:00 GMT		Report	Kellett 18'; Wildschut 86'	Stadium: Oakwell; Attendance: 8,866; Referee: Seb Stockbridge

26 December 2015 Postponed	Bury	P–P	Barnsley	Bury
15:00 BST		Report		Stadium: Gigg Lane

28 December 2015 24	Barnsley	4–2	Blackpool	Barnsley
15:00 GMT	Winnall 3', 54'; Watkins 56'; Templeton 90'	Report	52' Cullen; 90' Little	Stadium: Oakwell; Attendance: 9,072; Referee: Chris Sarginson

2 January 2016 25	Barnsley	2–1	Millwall	Barnsley
15:00 GMT	Winnall 12'; Hammill 67'	Report	61' Morison	Stadium: Oakwell; Attendance: 8,700; Referee: James Adcock

16 January 2016 26	Shrewsbury Town	0–3	Barnsley	Shrewsbury
15:00 GMT			15', 21' Winnall; 72' Mawson	Stadium: New Meadow; Attendance: 5,446; Referee: Phil Gibbs

23 January 2016 27	Barnsley	6–1	Rochdale	Barnsley
15:00 GMT	Mawson 8'; Winnall 52', 69', 89'; Watkins 84'; Long 90'	Report	65' Mendez-Laing	Stadium: Oakwell; Attendance: 8,823

26 January 2016 28	Bradford City	0–1	Barnsley	Bradford
19:45 GMT	McMahon (yellow card) 87'	Report	Watkins 2'; Winnall (yellow card) 45'	Stadium: Coral Windows Stadium; Attendance: 17,470

30 January 2016 29	Swindon Town	0–1	Barnsley	Swindon
15:00 GMT		Report	88' Winnall	Stadium: County Ground; Attendance: 7,532; Referee: Tim Robinson

7 February 2016 30	Barnsley	3–0	Bury	Barnsley
15:00 GMT	Watkins 20'; Winnall 55'; Hammill 66'	Report		Stadium: Oakwell; Attendance: 9,443; Referee: Andy Haines

13 February 2016 31	Gillingham	2–1	Barnsley	Gillingham
15:00 GMT	Samuel 25'; Donnelly (yellow card) 44'; Dack 63'	Report	Hourihane 62'	Stadium: Priestfield Stadium; Attendance: 5,887; Referee: Darren Bond

20 February 2016 32	Barnsley	1–0	Doncaster Rovers	Barnsley
15:00 GMT	White (yellow card) 13'; Fletcher 81'	Report	Grant (yellow card) 22'	Stadium: Oakwell; Attendance: 11,638; Referee: Andrew Madley

23 February 2016 23	Bury	0–0	Barnsley	Bury
19:45 GMT	Soares (yellow card) 26'; Tutte (yellow card) 43'; Rose (yellow card) 70'; Riley (yellow card) 75'; Pope (yellow card) 82'	Report	Scowen (yellow card) 25'; Roberts (yellow card) 32'; Hammill (red card) 82'	Stadium: Gigg Lane; Attendance: 3,160; Referee: Carl Boyeson

27 February 2016 33	Crewe Alexandra	1–2	Barnsley	Crewe
15:00 GMT	Fox (yellow card) 5'; Guthrie 32'; Nugent (yellow card) 66'	Report	Bree (yellow card) 45+1'; Winnall 53'; Watkins (yellow card) 62'; Mawson 67'; Isgrove (yellow card) 69'	Stadium: Alexandra Stadium; Attendance: 4,451; Referee: Seb Stockbridge

1 March 2016 34	Barnsley	2–0	Coventry City	Barnsley
19:45 GMT	Roberts 10'; Fletcher 60' (yellow card) 73'; Brownhill (yellow card) 70'	Report	Ricketts (yellow card) 58'	Stadium: Oakwell; Attendance: 9,344; Referee: Ross Joyce

5 March 2016 35	Walsall	1–3	Barnsley	Walsall
15:00 GMT	Bradshaw 28'	Report	Fletcher 17'; Brownhill 50'; Harry Chapman 56'; Callum Connolly (yellow card) 79'	Stadium: Banks's Stadium; Attendance: 5,199; Referee: Gavin Ward

12 March 2016 36	Barnsley	0–2	Southend United	Barnsley
15:00 GMT	Winnall (yellow card) 90+4'; Mawson (yellow card) 90+6'	Report	Payne 4'; Bentley (yellow card) 23'; Wordsworth (yellow card) 37'; Timlin 90+6'	Stadium: Oakwell; Attendance: 9,903; Referee: Brendan Malone

19 March 2016 37	Fleetwood Town	0–2	Barnsley	Fleetwood
15:00 GMT	Davis (yellow card) 31'	Report	Winnall (yellow card) 31'; Fletcher (yellow card) 40'; Davis 47' (o.g.); Scowen 84' (yellow card) 87'	Stadium: Highbury Stadium; Attendance: 3,470; Referee: Kevin Wright

25 March 2016 38	Barnsley	0–0	Scunthorpe United	Barnsley
15:00 GMT	Scowen (yellow card) 37'; Roberts (yellow card) 60'	Report	King (yellow card) 90+3'	Stadium: Oakwell; Attendance: 10,122; Referee: Darren Drysdale

28 March 2016 39	Port Vale	0–1	Barnsley	Burslem
15:00 GMT	Dickinson (yellow card) 8'	Report	Hourihane 9' (yellow card) 68'; Toney (yellow card) 17'; White (yellow card) 56'	Stadium: Vale Park; Attendance: 4,839; Referee: Scott Duncan

9 April 2016 40	Barnsley	1–2	Chesterfield	Barnsley
15:00 GMT	Hammill 75' (yellow card) 83'	Report	Novak 57'; Lee (yellow card) 70'; Campbell-Ryce (yellow card) 76' (yellow-red card); Banks 81'	Stadium: Oakwell; Attendance: 10,645; Referee: Neil Swarbrick

12 April 2016 41	Barnsley	2–1	Oldham Athletic	Barnsley
19:45 GMT	Winnall 45' (yellow card) 55' (goal) 83' (pen.)	Report	Gerrard (yellow card) 52'; Coleman (yellow card) 55'; Main 68'; Dummigan (yellow card) 74'; Dieng (yellow card) 81'	Stadium: Oakwell; Attendance: 8,871; Referee: Simon Hooper

16 April 2016 42	Burton Albion	0–0	Barnsley	Burton upon Trent
15:00 GMT	Flanagan (yellow card) 57'; Edwards (yellow card) 89'; Choudhury (yellow card) 90'	Report		Stadium: Pirelli Stadium; Attendance: 4,858; Referee: Andrew Davies

19 April 2016 43	Barnsley	1–0	Peterborough United	Barnsley
19:45 GMT	Hourihane (yellow card) 40'; Williams 90'	Report	Forrester (yellow card) 40' (yellow-red card); Bostwick (yellow card) 45'; Zakuani (yellow card) 81'; Alnwick (yellow card) 88'	Stadium: Oakwell; Attendance: 8,886; Referee: Michael Bull

23 April 2016 44	Sheffield United	0–0	Barnsley	Sheffield
12:30 GMT		Report		Stadium: Bramall Lane; Attendance: 23,307

30 April 2016 45	Barnsley	2–2	Colchester United	Barnsley
15:00 GMT	Fletcher 57' 80'; Hourihane (yellow card) 64'	Report	Moncur 42'; Lapslie 90+8'	Stadium: Oakwell; Attendance: 12,021; Referee: Nigel Miller

8 May 2016 46	Wigan Athletic	1–4	Barnsley	Wigan
12:30 GMT	Grigg 10'; Perkins (yellow card) 34'; McCann (red card) 90+4'	Report	Winnall 33' (pen.) 44'; Hourihane 56'; Brownhill 74'; Hammill (yellow card) 90+4'	Stadium: DW Stadium; Attendance: 18,730; Referee: Tony Harrington

=== League One play-offs ===
14 May 2016 First Leg	Barnsley	3–0	Walsall	Barnsley
17:30 GMT	Demetriou 45' (o.g.); Winnall 54', 55'	Report		Stadium: Oakwell; Attendance: 16,051; Referee: Peter Bankes

19 May 2016 Second Leg	Walsall	1–3 (1–6 agg.)	Barnsley	Walsall
19:45 GMT	Cook 85'	Report	Hammill 18'; Fletcher 66'; Brownhill 90'	Stadium: Banks's Stadium; Attendance: 8,022; Referee: Darren Deadman

29 May 2016 final	Barnsley	3–1	Millwall	London
15:00 GMT	Fletcher 2'; Hammill 19'; Williams (yellow card) 28'; Roberts (yellow card) 63'; Isgrove 74'	Report	Beevers 34'	Stadium: Wembley Stadium; Attendance: 51,277; Referee: Stuart Attwell

=== FA Cup ===
7 November 2015 First round	Altrincham	1–0	Barnsley	Altrincham
15:00	Damian Reeves 46'	Report		Stadium: Moss Lane; Attendance: 2,571; Referee: Andy Haines

=== League Cup ===
11 August 2015 First round	Scunthorpe United	1–1 (6–7 p)	Barnsley	Scunthorpe
19:45 BST	Madden 52' (pen.)	Report	Scowen 47' (pen.)	Stadium: Glanford Park; Attendance: 3,003; Referee: Graham Salisbury
	Penalties
	Madden (penalty scored); Hopper (penalty scored); Adelakun (penalty scored); Laird (penalty scored); Bishop (penalty scored) van Veen (penalty missed); Mirfin (penalty scored); McAllister (penalty missed)		Winnall (penalty scored); Hourihane (penalty scored); Scowen (penalty scored); Mawson (penalty scored); Roberts (penalty scored); Pearson (penalty missed); Nyatanga (penalty scored); Bree (penalty scored)

25 August 2015 Second round	Barnsley	3–5 (a.e.t.)	Everton	Barnsley
19:45 BST	Winnall 22'; Watkins 28'; Crowley 60'	Report	Mirallas 51'; Naismith 59'; Lukaku 78', 115'; Roberts 96' (o.g.)	Stadium: Oakwell; Referee: Simon Hooper

=== Football League Trophy ===
1 September 2015 First round	Scunthorpe United	1–2	Barnsley	Scunthorpe
19:45 BST	Goode 90'	Report	Nyatanga 62'; Watkins 76'	Stadium: Glanford Park; Attendance: 1,796; Referee: Ben Toner

13 October 2015 Second round	Bradford City	1–2	Barnsley	Bradford
19:45 BST	Knott 22'	Summary	Watkins 45'; Mawson 69'	Stadium: Valley Parade; Attendance: 4,127; Referee: Trevor Kettle

10 November 2015 Third round	Barnsley	2–1	York City	Barnsley
19:45 GMT	Pearson 67'; Hammill 83'	Report	Coulson 40'	Stadium: Oakwell; Attendance: 3,360; Referee: David Webb

5 December 2015 Northern Semi Final	Wigan Athletic	2–2 (2–4 p)	Barnsley	Wigan
15:00 GMT	Grigg 48', 82'	Report	42' Hammill; 53' Toney	Stadium: DW Stadium; Attendance: 6,628; Referee: Keith Hill
	Penalties
	Power (penalty scored); Davies (penalty missed); Perkins (penalty missed); Flores (penalty scored)		(penalty scored) Hourihane; (penalty scored) Toney; (penalty scored) Winnall; (penalty scored) Mawson

9 January 2016 Northern Final 1st Leg	Barnsley	1–1	Fleetwood Town	Barnsley
15:00 GMT	Fletcher 73'	Report	61' (o.g.) Davies	Stadium: Oakwell; Attendance: 11,403; Referee: Fred Graham

4 February 2016 Northern Final 2nd Leg	Fleetwood Town	1–1 (a.e.t.) (2–2 agg.) (2–4 p)	Barnsley	Fleetwood
19:45 GMT	Hunter 81'	Report	Brownhill (yellow card) 42'; Hourihane 67'	Stadium: Highbury Stadium; Attendance: 3,705; Referee: Eddie Ilderton
	Penalties
	Ball (penalty scored); Grant (penalty scored); McLaughlin (penalty missed); Bell (penalty missed)		(penalty scored) Long; (penalty scored) Hourihane; (penalty missed) Scowen; (penalty scored) Winnall; (penalty scored) Hammill

3 April 2016 Final	Barnsley	3–2	Oxford United	London
GMT	Dunkley 52' (o.g.) Fletcher 68'; Hammill 74'; Toney (yellow card) 90+7'	Report	O'Dowda 29'; Hylton 76'; Maguire (yellow card) 81'	Stadium: Wembley Stadium; Attendance: 59,230; Referee: Andy Woolmer

== Overall summary ==
=== Summary ===
Games played	59 (46 League One, 1 FA Cup, 2 League Cup, 7 League Trophy, 3 Play-offs)
Games won	30 (22 League One, 0 FA Cup, 1 League Cup, 7 League Trophy, 3 Play-offs)
Games drawn	9 (8 League One, 0 FA Cup, 1 League Cup, 0 League Trophy)
Games lost	18 (16 League One, 1 FA Cup, 1 League Cup, 0 League Trophy, 0 Play-offs)
Goals scored	96 (70 League One, 0 FA Cup, 4 League Cup, 13 League Trophy, 9 Play-offs)
Goals conceded	72 (54 League One, 1 FA Cup, 6 League Cup, 9 League Trophy, 2 Play-offs)
Goal difference	+16
Clean sheets	17 (16 League One, 0 FA Cup, 0 League Cup, 0 League Trophy, 1 Play-offs)
Yellow cards	99 (77 League One, 1 FA Cup, 4 League Cup, 14 League Trophy, 3 Play-offs)
Red cards	2 (2 League One, 0 FA Cup, 0 League Cup, 0 League Trophy)
Worst discipline	Conor Hourihane (11 (yellow card) , 0 (red card) )
Best result	6–1 vs Rochdale (23 Jan 16)
Worst result	0–3 vs Rochdale (29 Aug 15)
Most appearances	Alfie Mawson (59)
Top scorer	Sam Winnall (24)
Points	74

=== Score overview ===
Opposition	Home score	Away score	Double
Blackpool	4–2	1–1	No
Bradford City	0–0	1–0	No
Burton Albion	1–0	0–0	No
Bury	3–0	0–0	No
Chesterfield	1–2	1–3	No
Colchester United	2–2	3–2	No
Coventry City	2–0	3–4	No
Crewe Alexandra	1–2	2–1	No
Doncaster Rovers	1–0	1–2	No
Fleetwood Town	0–1	2–0	No
Gillingham	2–0	1–2	No
Millwall	2–1	3–2	Yes
Oldham Athletic	2–1	2–1	Yes
Peterborough United	1–0	2–3	No
Port Vale	1–2	1–0	No
Rochdale	6–1	0–3	No
Scunthorpe United	0–0	0–2	No
Sheffield United	0–0	1–1	No
Shrewsbury Town	1–2	3–0	No
Southend United	0–2	1–2	No
Swindon Town	4–1	1–0	Yes
Walsall	0–2	3–1	No
Wigan Athletic	0–2	4–1	No
