= 2016–17 Barnsley F.C. season =

Barnsley
2016–17 season
- Owner: Patrick Cryne
- Chairman: Maurice Watkins
- Head Coach: Paul Heckingbottom
- Stadium: Oakwell
- Championship: 14th
- FA Cup: Third round (eliminated by Blackpool)
- EFL Cup: First round (eliminated by Northampton Town)
- Top goalscorer: League: Sam Winnall (11); All: Sam Winnall (11)
Home colours	Away colours	Third colours

The 2016–17 season saw Barnsley's return to the Championship after two seasons in League One, following their relegation in the 2013–14 season. Along with the Championship, the club also competed in the FA Cup and League Cup. The season covered the period from 1 July 2016 to 30 June 2017.

== Squad ==
No.	Name	Pos.	Nat.	Place of Birth	Age	Apps	Goals	Signed from	Date signed	Fee	Contract End
Goalkeepers
1	Adam Davies	GK	(Wales) (Germany)	Rinteln	34	124	0	Sheffield Wednesday	13 June 2014	Free	2019
13	Nick Townsend	GK	(England)	Solihull	32	10	0	Birmingham City	1 September 2015	Undisclosed	2018
30	Jack Walton	GK	(England)	Bury	28	0	0	Academy	1 July 2015	Trainee	2018
Defenders
3	Aidan White	LB	(England)	Otley	35	32	0	Rotherham United	January 2016	Free	2017
4	Marc Roberts (Captain)	CB	(England)	Barnsley	36	85	5	FC Halifax Town	1 July 2015	Free	2018
5	Angus MacDonald	CB	(England)	Winchester	34	41	2	Torquay United	2 August 2016	Undisclosed	2018
16	Callum Evans	LB	(England)	Bristol	31	3	0	Manchester United	29 April 2016	Free	2017
17	Andy Yiadom	RB/RW	(Ghana)	Holloway	34	33	0	Barnet	1 July 2016	Free	2018
18	Adam Jackson	CB	(England)	Darlington	32	11	0	Middlesbrough	30 August 2016	Undisclosed	2019
19	Cole Kpekawa	LB	(England)	Blackpool	30	7	0	QueensPark Rangers	31 August 2016	£450,000	2019
21	Saidy Janko	RB	(Switzerland)	Zürich	31	14	1	Celtic	31 August 2016	Loan	2017
24	Jack Cowgill	CB	(England)	Wakefield	29	2	0	Academy	1 July 2014	Trainee	2017
29	Gethin Jones	RB	(Wales) (Australia)	Perth	31	17	0	Everton	18 January 2017	Loan	2017
38	Callum Elder	LB	(Australia)	Sydney	31	5	0	Leicester City	31 January 2017	Loan	2017
Midfielders
6	Josh Scowen	CM	(England)	Enfield	33	108	12	Wycobme Wanderers	15 January 2015	Undisclosed	2017
7	Adam Hammill	RW	(England)	Liverpool	38	158	25	Free agent	9 November 2015	Free	2018
10	George Moncur	AM	(England)	Swindon	33	13	2	Colchester United	21 June 2016	£500,000	Undisclosed
15	Marley Watkins	RW/SS	(Wales) (England)	London	36	87	18	Inverness CT	1 July 2015	Free	2017
22	Sessi D'Almeida	CM	(Benin) (France)	Bordeaux	20	3	0	Free agent	11 August 2016	Free	2018
27	Alex Mowatt	CM	(England)	Doncaster	31	11	1	Leeds United	31 January 2017	£600,000	2019
28	Ryan Williams	RW	(Australia)	Subiaco	33	30	1	Fulham	26 July 2015	Undisclosed	2017
34	Ryan Hedges	WG/SS	(Wales) (England)	Northampton	31	8	0	Swansea City	31 January 2017	Undisclosed	2019
36	Matty James	CM	(England)	Bacup	35	18	1	Leicester City	25 January 2017	Loan	2017
40	Ryan Kent	LW/SS	(England)	Oldham	29	47	3	Liverpool	26 July 2016	Loan	2017
Forwards
11	Elliot Lee	CF	(England)	Durham	31	6	0	West Ham United	25 June 2016	Free	2018
20	Tom Bradshaw	CF	(Wales) (England)	Swindon	34	45	8	Walsall	14 July 2016	£550,000	2019
23	Stefan Payne	CF	(England)	Lambeth	35	9	0	Dover Athletic	18 May 2016	Undisclosed	2018
32	Adam Armstrong	CF	(England)	Chapel House	29	35	6	Newcastle United	30 August 2016	Loan	2017

== Statistics ==
As of 11 May 2017

No.	Pos	Nat	Player	Total		Championship		FA Cup		League Cup	
No.	Pos	Nat	Player	Apps	Goals	Apps	Goals	Apps	Goals	Apps	Goals
1	GK	(Wales) WAL	Adam Davies	49	0	46+0	0	2+0	0	1+0	0
3	DF	(England) ENG	Aidy White	13	0	10+0	0	2+0	0	1+0	0
4	DF	(England) ENG	Marc Roberts	43	4	40+0	4	2+0	0	1+0	0
5	DF	(England) ENG	Angus MacDonald	40	2	38+0	1	2+0	1	0+0	0
6	MF	(England) ENG	Josh Scowen	44	3	38+3	2	2+0	0	1+0	1
7	MF	(England) ENG	Adam Hammill	40	3	21+16	3	2+0	0	1+0	0
10	MF	(England) ENG	George Moncur	13	2	8+4	2	0+0	0	1+0	0
11	FW	(England) ENG	Elliott Lee	6	0	0+6	0	0+0	0	0+0	0
15	MF	(Wales) WAL	Marley Watkins	45	10	34+8	10	1+1	0	1+0	0
16	DF	(England) ENG	Callum Evans	1	0	0+1	0	0+0	0	0+0	0
17	DF	(England) ENG	Andy Yiadom	33	0	31+1	0	0+0	0	0+1	0
18	DF	(England) ENG	Adam Jackson	11	0	9+1	0	0+1	0	0+0	0
19	DF	(England) ENG	Cole Kpekawa	7	0	4+3	0	0+0	0	0+0	0
20	FW	(England) ENG	Tom Bradshaw	45	8	28+14	8	2+0	0	1+0	0
21	DF	(Switzerland) SUI	Saidy Janko	14	1	7+7	1	0+0	0	0+0	0
22	MF	(Benin) BEN	Sessi D'Almeida	3	0	0+3	0	0+0	0	0+0	0
26	MF	(England) ENG	Jacob Brown	2	0	0+2	0	0+0	0	0+0	0
27	MF	(England) ENG	Alex Mowatt	11	1	6+5	1	0+0	0	0+0	0
28	MF	(Australia) AUS	Ryan Williams	17	1	4+12	1	0+1	0	0+0	0
29	DF	(Wales) WAL	Gethin Jones	17	0	16+1	0	0+0	0	0+0	0
32	FW	(England) ENG	Adam Armstrong	33	6	22+10	6	1+0	0	0+0	0
34	MF	(Wales) WAL	Ryan Hedges	9	0	3+6	0	0+0	0	0+0	0
36	MF	(England) ENG	Matty James	18	1	17+1	1	0+0	0	0+0	0
38	DF	(Australia) AUS	Callum Elder	5	0	5+0	0	0+0	0	0+0	0
40	MF	(England) ENG	Ryan Kent	46	3	39+4	3	1+1	0	0+1	0
Player(s) out on loan:
16	DF	(England) ENG	Callum Evans	2	0	1+1	0	0+0	0	0+0	0
23	FW	(England) ENG	Stefan Payne	9	0	0+7	0	0+1	0	0+1	0
41	MF	(England) ENG	Josh Kay	1	0	1+0	0	0+0	0	0+0	0
Player(s) who left the club:
2	DF	(England) ENG	James Bree	22	0	18+1	0	2+0	0	1+0	0
8	MF	(Republic of Ireland) IRL	Conor Hourihane	28	6	25+0	6	2+0	0	1+0	0
9	FW	(England) ENG	Sam Winnall	21	11	18+2	11	1+0	0	0+0	0
26	DF	(England) ENG	Alfie Mawson	5	2	4+0	2	0+0	0	1+0	0
29	MF	(Egypt) EGY	Sam Morsy	14	0	12+2	0	0+0	0	0+0	0

=== Goals record ===
As of 11 May 2017

Rank	No.	Nat.	Po.	Name	Championship	FA Cup	League Cup	Total
1	~~9~~	(England)	CF	Sam Winnall	11	0	0	11
2	15	(Wales)	RW	Marley Watkins	10	0	0	10
3	20	(Wales)	CF	Tom Bradshaw	8	0	0	8
4	~~8~~	(Republic of Ireland)	CM	Conor Hourihane	6	0	0	6
4	32	(England)	CF	Adam Armstrong	6	0	0	6
6	4	(England)	CB	Marc Roberts	4	0	0	4
7	6	(England)	CM	Josh Scowen	2	0	1	3
7	7	(England)	RW	Adam Hammill	3	0	0	3
7	40	(England)	LW	Ryan Kent	3	0	0	3
10	5	(England)	CB	Angus MacDonald	1	1	0	2
10	10	(England)	AM	George Moncur	2	0	0	2
10	~~26~~	(England)	CB	Alfie Mawson	2	0	0	2
13	21	(Switzerland)	LB	Saidy Janko	1	0	0	1
13	27	(England)	CM	Alex Mowatt	1	0	0	1
13	28	(Australia)	RW	Ryan Williams	1	0	0	1
13	36	(England)	CM	Matty James	1	0	0	1
Own Goals					2	0	0	2
Total					61	1	1	63

=== Disciplinary record ===
As of 11 May 2017

Rank	No.	Nat.	Po.	Name	Championship			FA Cup			League Cup			Total		
Rank	No.	Nat.	Po.	Name	Yellow card	(yellow card) (yellow-red card)	Red card	Yellow card	(yellow card) (yellow-red card)	Red card	Yellow card	(yellow card) (yellow-red card)	Red card	Yellow card	(yellow card) (yellow-red card)	Red card
1	6	(England)	CM	Josh Scowen	8	0	1	2	0	0	0	0	0	10	0	1
2	5	(England)	CB	Angus MacDonald	8	0	0	1	0	0	0	0	0	9	0	0
2	15	(Wales)	RW	Marley Watkins	8	0	1	0	0	0	0	0	0	8	0	1
4	7	(England)	RW	Adam Hammill	6	0	1	1	0	0	0	0	0	7	0	1
5	~~8~~	(Republic of Ireland)	CM	Conor Hourihane	7	0	0	0	0	0	0	0	0	7	0	0
4	4	(England)	CB	Marc Roberts	4	0	1	0	0	0	0	0	0	4	0	1
4	~~29~~	(Egypt)	CM	Sam Morsy	5	0	0	0	0	0	0	0	0	5	0	0
4	40	(England)	LW	Ryan Kent	5	0	0	0	0	0	0	0	0	5	0	0
7	17	(England)	RB	Andy Yiadom	4	0	0	0	0	0	0	0	0	4	0	0
7	29	(Wales)	RB	Gethin Jones	4	0	0	0	0	0	0	0	0	4	0	0
9	1	(Wales)	GK	Adam Davies	3	0	0	0	0	0	0	0	0	3	0	0
9	~~9~~	(England)	CF	Sam Winnall	3	0	0	0	0	0	0	0	0	3	0	0
9	32	(England)	CF	Adam Armstrong	3	0	0	0	0	0	0	0	0	3	0	0
12	19	(England)	LB	Cole Kpekawa	2	0	0	0	0	0	0	0	0	2	0	0
12	21	(Switzerland)	RB	Saidy Janko	2	0	0	0	0	0	0	0	0	2	0	0
14	3	(England)	LB	Aidy White	1	0	0	0	0	0	0	0	0	1	0	0
14	18	(England)	CB	Adam Jackson	1	0	0	0	0	0	0	0	0	1	0	0
14	22	(Benin)	CM	Sessi D'Almeida	1	0	0	0	0	0	0	0	0	1	0	0
14	27	(England)	CM	Alex Mowatt	0	0	1	0	0	0	0	0	0	0	0	1
14	29	(Wales)	RB	Gethin Jones	1	0	0	0	0	0	0	0	0	1	0	0
14	41	(England)	CM	Josh Kay	1	0	0	0	0	0	0	0	0	1	0	0
Total					79	0	5	4	0	0	0	0	0	83	0	5

== Transfers ==
=== In ===
Date from	Position	Nationality	Name	From	Fee	Ref.
1 July 2016	RB	ENG	Andy Yiadom	Barnet	Free transfer	
1 July 2016	CF	ENG	Stefan Payne	Dover Athletic	Free transfer	
1 July 2016	CF	ENG	Kayden Jackson	Wrexham	Free transfer	
1 July 2016	AM	ENG	George Moncur	Colchester United	£500,000	
1 July 2016	CF	ENG	Elliot Lee	West Ham United	Free transfer	
12 July 2016	RB	ENG	Elliot Kebbie	Salford City	Free transfer	
12 July 2016	WG	ENG	Dylan Mottley-Henry	Bradford City	Free transfer	
14 July 2016	CF	WAL	Tom Bradshaw	Walsall	£550,000	
2 August 2016	CB	ENG	Angus MacDonald	Torquay United	Undisclosed	
11 August 2016	CM	BEN	Sessi D'Almeida	Paris Saint-Germain B	Free transfer	
30 August 2016	CB	ENG	Adam Jackson	Middlesbrough	Undisclosed	
31 August 2016	CF	WAL	Jake Charles	Huddersfield Town	Undisclosed	
31 August 2016	LB	ENG	Cole Kpekawa	Queens Park Rangers	Undisclosed	
22 September 2016	CF	ENG	Omari Patrick	Kidderminster Harriers	Free transfer	
27 January 2017	CM	ENG	Alex Mowatt	Leeds United	Undisclosed	
31 January 2017	RW	WAL	Ryan Hedges	Swansea City	Undisclosed	

=== Out ===
Date from	Position	Nationality	Name	To	Fee	Ref.
1 July 2016	MF	ENG	Brad Abbott	Free agent	Released	
1 July 2016	GK	WAL	Christian Dibble	Boston United	Free transfer	
1 July 2016	DM	ENG	Paul Digby	Ipswich Town	Free transfer	
1 July 2016	MF	ENG	Ben Drennan	Free Agent	Released	
1 July 2016	DF	ENG	Bailey Gooda	Free Agent	Released	
1 July 2016	RW	PAK	Otis Khan	Yeovil Town	Free transfer	
1 July 2016	CF	ENG	George Maris	Cambridge United (Note: Following Maris' release, he signed for Cambridge United.)	Released	
1 July 2016	CM	ENG	Jak McCourt	Northampton Town (Note: Following McCourt's release, he signed for Northampton Town.)	Released	
1 July 2016	LB	ENG	George Smith	Gateshead (Note: Following Smith's release, he signed for Gateshead.)	Released	
1 July 2016	CF	ENG	Harry White	Solihull Moors	Free transfer	
1 July 2016	RB	ENG	George Williams	Milton Keynes Dons (Note: Following Williams' release, he signed for Milton Keynes Dons.)	Released	
30 August 2016	CB	ENG	Alfie Mawson	Swansea City	£5,500,000	
13 January 2017	CF	ENG	Sam Winnall	Sheffield Wednesday	Undisclosed	
25 January 2017	RB	ENG	James Bree	Aston Villa	Undisclosed	
26 January 2017	CM	IRL	Conor Hourihane (Captain) (Note: Conor Hourihane was Barnsley first team Captain from July 2016 to 26 January 2017, before he signed for Aston Villa in January 2017.)	Aston Villa	Undisclosed	

=== Loans in ===
Date from	Position	Nationality	Name	From	Date until	Ref.
26 July 2016	WG	ENG	Ryan Kent	Liverpool	End of Season	
30 August 2016	CF	ENG	Adam Armstrong	Newcastle United	End of Season (Note: On 5 January 2017, Adam Armstrong's loan from Newcastle United was extended until the end of the season.)	
31 August 2016	CM	EGY	Sam Morsy	Wigan Athletic	End of Season	
31 August 2016	RB	SWI	Saidy Janko	Celtic	End of Season	
31 August 2016	CB	ESP	Julio Rodríguez	Sporting de Gijón	End of Season	
18 January 2017	RB	WAL	Gethin Jones	Everton	End of Season	
25 January 2017	CM	ENG	Matty James	Leicester City	End of Season	

=== Loans out ===
Date from	Position	Nationality	Name	To	Date until	Ref.
22 July 2016	CF	ENG	Kayden Jackson	Grimsby Town	End of season	
8 August 2016	CB	WAL	Lewin Nyatanga	Northampton Town	End of season	
31 August 2016	CF	ENG	Shaun Tuton	Grimsby Town	31 December 2016	(Note: On 31 December 2016, Shaun Tuton's loan was terminated.)
31 August 2016	AM	ENG	George Moncur	Peterborough United	7 January 2017	
16 September 2016	CB	ENG	Jack Cowgill	Braintree Town	14 October 2016	
25 November 2016	LW	WAL	Jake Charles	York City	23 December 2016	
30 January 2017	CF	ENG	Stefan Payne	Shrewsbury Town	End of Season	
3 February 2017	CF	ENG	Shaun Tuton	Barrow	End of Season	
17 February 2017	LB	ENG	Callum Evans	Macclesfield Town	End of Season	

== Competitions ==
=== Pre-season friendlies ===
9 July 2016 Friendly	Stalybridge Celtic	0–2	Barnsley	Stalybridge
15:00 BST		Report	Hammill 54' (pen.); Cowgill 84'	Stadium: Bower Fold

12 July 2016 Friendly	Guiseley	0–2	Barnsley	Guiseley
19:30		Report	Carvell 22'; Payne 52'	Stadium: Nethermoor Park

16 July 2016 Friendly	Weston-super-Mare	0–6	Barnsley	Weston-super-Mare
15:00		Report	Payne 49', 59', 63'; Hourihane 73'; Hammill 78'; Bradshaw 80'	Stadium: Woodspring Stadium

19 July 2016 Friendly	Cheltenham Town	1–3	Barnsley	Cheltenham
19:45	Holman 83'	Report	Winnall 36', 45'; Tuton 85'	Stadium: Whaddon Road

23 July 2016 Friendly	Barnsley	0–3	Everton	Barnsley
15:00		Report	Mirallas 9'; Barkley 60', 73'	Stadium: Oakwell

26 July 2016 Friendly	Barnsley	2–2	Hull City	Barnsley
19:30	Bradshaw 31', 53'	Report	Diomande 15'; Bowen 86'	Stadium: Oakwell

30 July 2016 Friendly	Peterborough United	0–2	Barnsley	Peterborough
15:00		Report	Scowen 7'; Payne 89'	Stadium: London Road Stadium

=== EFL Championship ===
==== League table ====
Pos	Team	Pld	W	D	L	GF	GA	GD	Pts
12	Cardiff City	46	17	11	18	60	61	−1	62
13	Aston Villa	46	16	14	16	47	48	−1	62
14	Barnsley	46	15	13	18	64	67	−3	58
15	Wolverhampton Wanderers	46	16	10	20	54	58	−4	58
16	Ipswich Town	46	13	16	17	48	58	−10	55

Source: English Football League, Soccerway
Rules for classification: 1) Points; 2) Goal difference; 3) Number of goals scored; 4) Points in head-to-head matches; 5) Goal difference in head-to-head matches; 6) Goals scored in head-to-head matches; 7) Play-off.

==== Results summary ====
Overall								Home						Away					
Pld	W	D	L	GF	GA	GD	Pts	W	D	L	GF	GA	GD	W	D	L	GF	GA	GD
46	15	13	18	64	67	−3	58	6	11	6	32	33	−1	9	2	12	32	34	−2

Last updated: 29 April 2017.
Source: Football League Championship

==== Results by matchday ====
Matchday	1	2	3	4	5	6	7	8	9	10	11	12	13	14	15	16	17	18	19	20	21	22	23	24	25	26	27	28	29	30	31	32	33	34	35	36	37	38	39	40	41	42	43	44	45	46
Ground	A	H	H	A	H	A	A	H	A	H	A	H	H	A	H	A	H	H	A	H	A	A	H	H	A	A	H	A	H	H	A	A	H	H	A	A	H	A	H	H	A	A	H	A	H	A
Result	L	W	W	L	W	W	W	L	L	D	L	L	L	W	D	D	D	L	W	W	L	W	W	D	W	L	W	W	L	D	D	W	L	D	L	L	D	L	D	D	W	L	D	L	D	L
Position	22	14	7	9	3	3	3	4	7	10	10	11	15	12	12	13	15	18	12	11	12	12	9	9	8	10	8	7	8	9	10	9	9	10	11	11	11	11	13	13	13	13	14	14	14	14

Updated to match(es) played on 7 May 2017. Source: Statto.com
A = Away; H = Home; W = Win; D = Draw; L = Loss

==== Matches ====
6 August 2016 1	Ipswich Town	4–2	Barnsley	Ipswich
15:00 BST	Bishop (yellow card) 20'; Bru (yellow card) 37'; Ward 46', 61', 84'; McGoldrick 63' (pen.)	report	(yellow card) 27' (goal) 74' Watkins; (yellow card) 42'Kent; 49' (yellow card) 58' Hourihane	Stadium: Portman Road; Attendance: 17,370 (1,117 Reds)

13 August 2016 2	Barnsley	2–0	Derby County	Barnsley
15:00 BST	Carson 11' (o.g.); Watkins (yellow card) 33'; Mawson 47'; Hourihane (yellow card) 56'; Hammill (yellow card) 81'	Report	47' Butterfield; (yellow card) 58' Bryson; (yellow card) 77' Christie; (yellow card) 83' Ince	Stadium: Oakwell; Attendance: 15,049; Referee: Tony Harrington

17 August 2016 3	Barnsley	3–2	Queens Park Rangers	Barnsley
19:45 BST	Watkins 4'; Roberts (yellow card) 46'; Hourihane 77'; Scowen 89'	Report	47' (pen.) Chery; (yellow card) 61' (yellow-red card) 90+5' Hall; 74' (pen.)Polter; (yellow card) 90+3' Onuoha	Stadium: Oakwell; Attendance: 11,613 (572 away); Referee: Darren Bond

20 August 2016 4	Huddersfield Town	2–1	Barnsley	Huddersfield
15:00 BST	Löwe 27' (yellow card) 37'; Smith (yellow card) 64'; Palmer (yellow card) 75'; Kachunga (yellow card) 90+1'; Hogg 90+2'	BBC Report	47' Mawson; (yellow card) 83' D'Almeida; (yellow card) 90+7' Roberts	Stadium: John Smith's Stadium; Attendance: 20,001; Referee: Chris Kavanagh

27 August 2016 5	Barnsley	4–0	Rotherham United	Barnsley
15:00 BST	Roberts 54'; Scowen (yellow card) 55'; Hammill 57'; Bradshaw 86'; Kent 90+1'	Report	(yellow card) 90+1' Newell	Stadium: Oakwell; Attendance: 15,283; Referee: Graham Scott

10 September 2016 6	Preston North End	1–2	Barnsley	Preston
15:00 BST	Spurr (yellow card) 39'; Cunningham (yellow card) 47'; McGeady 64'; Hugill (yellow card) 81'	BBC Report	27' Winnall; (yellow card) 50' Roberts; 79' Armstrong; (yellow card) 88' Yiadom; (yellow card) 90+1' Davies	Stadium: Deepdale; Attendance: 11,852; Referee: Geoff Eltringham

13 September 2016 7	Wolverhampton Wanderers	0–4	Barnsley	Wolverhampton
19:45 BST		Report	(yellow card) 42' Scowen; 73' Hourihane; (yellow card) 78' Hammill; 83', 85' Janko; (yellow card) 84' Watkins; 90+1' Bradshaw	Stadium: Molineux Stadium; Attendance: 18,668

17 September 2016 8	Barnsley	1–2	Reading	Barnsley
15:00 BST	Hammill (yellow card) 33'; Hourihane (yellow card) 35'; Armstrong (yellow card) 63' (goal) 81'	BBC Report	9' (red card) 34' McCleary; 27' (yellow card) 50' Swift; (yellow card) 42' Kermorgant; (yellow card) 45+1' Williams; (yellow card) 60' Blackett	Stadium: Oakwell; Attendance: 12,675; Referee: David Coote

24 September 2016 9	Brighton & Hove Albion	2–0	Barnsley	Falmer, Brighton
15:00 BST	Dunk (yellow card) 9'; Murray 12', 48'; Bong (yellow card) 19'; Bruno (yellow card) 28'	Report	Scowen (yellow card) 66'; Kpekawa (yellow card) 72'	Stadium: Falmer Stadium; Attendance: 26,018

27 September 2016 10	Barnsley	1–1	Aston Villa	Barnsley
19:45 BST	Kpekawa (yellow card) 31'; Sam Morsy (yellow card) 34'; MacDonald (yellow card) 64'; Yiadom (yellow card) 80'; Winnall 90'	Report	Bacuna (yellow card) 53'; Ayew 61'; Jedinak (yellow card) 63'; Tshibola (yellow card) 68'	Stadium: Oakwell Stadium; Attendance: 15,830; Referee: James Adcock

1 October 2016 11	Leeds United	2–1	Barnsley	Leeds
15:00 BST	Bartley 36'; Pablo Hernández 54'; Taylor (yellow card) 90+1'	Report	Taylor 70' (o.g.)	Stadium: Elland Road; Attendance: 27,350; Referee: Simon Hooper

15 October 2016 12	Barnsley	2–4	Fulham	Barnsley
15:00 BST	Watkins 4'; Winnall 41' (yellow card) 54'; Scowen (red card) 67'; Hammill (yellow card) 90+2'	Report	Johansen (yellow card) 14'; Cairney (yellow card) 29'; Lucas Piazon 37'; Aluko 42'; Malone 46'; Martin (yellow card) 56' (goal) 65'; Button (yellow card) 61'	Stadium: Oakwell Stadium; Attendance: 11,974; Referee: Keith Stroud

18 October 2016 13	Barnsley	0–2	Newcastle United	Barnsley
19:45 BST	Hourihane (yellow card) 38'	Report	Lascelles (yellow card) 40'; Gayle 49', 68'; Shelvey (yellow card) 74'	Stadium: Oakwell Stadium; Attendance: 18,597; Referee: Paul Tierney

22 October 2016 14	Brentford	0–2	Barnsley	Brentford
15:00 BST	Hogan (yellow card) 45+2'; McEachran (yellow card) 66'	Report	Armstrong 29'; Winnall (yellow card) 45+1' (goal) 67'; MacDonald (yellow card) 45+2'; Hourihane (yellow card) 81'	Stadium: Griffin Park; Attendance: 10,417; Referee: James Linington

29 October 2016 15	Barnsley	2–2	Bristol City	Barnsley
15:00 BST	Watkins 21'; Sam Morsy (yellow card) 23'; Kay (yellow card) 42'; Winnall (penalty missed) 45+3'; Jackson (yellow card) 58'; Hammill 90+1'	Report	Wilbraham (yellow card) 28'; Smith (yellow card) 45+1'; Tomlin 58' (pen.); Bryan (yellow card) 69'; Abraham 76'	Stadium: Oakwell Stadium; Attendance: 11,869; Referee: Geoff Eltringham

5 November 2016 16	Burton Albion	0–0	Barnsley	Burton-upon-Trent
15:00 GMT	Turner (yellow card) 73'	Report	MacDonald (yellow card) 32'	Stadium: Pirelli Stadium; Attendance: 4,913; Referee: Peter Bankes

19 November 2016 17	Barnsley	0–0	Wigan Athletic	Barnsley
15:00 GMT		Report	(yellow card) 43' MacDonald; (yellow card) 71' Morgan	Stadium: Oakwell; Attendance: 12,181; Referee: Jeremy Simpson

25 November 2016 18	Barnsley	2–5	Nottingham Forest	Barnsley
19:45 GMT	Winnall 5'; Watkins 14' (red card) 66'	Report	Lansbury 13', 45+1', 82' (pen.); Vellios 24'; Fox (yellow card) 61'; Osborn 63'	Stadium: Oakwell Stadium; Attendance: 13,180; Referee: Oliver Langford

3 December 2016 19	Birmingham City	0–3	Barnsley	Birmingham
15:00 GMT	Cogley (yellow card) 34'; Davis (yellow card) 38' (yellow-red card) 71'; Tesche (yellow card) 87'	Report	Kent (yellow card) 3'; Sam Morsy (yellow card) 24'; Roberts 38'; Winnall 84', 87'	Stadium: St Andrew's; Attendance: 17,072; Referee: David Coote

10 December 2016 20	Barnsley	2–1	Norwich City	Barnsley
15:00 GMT	Bradshaw 12'; Hourihane 40'	Report	52' Oliveria	Stadium: Oakwell; Attendance: 12,306; Referee: Andy Woolmer

13 December 2016 21	Sheffield Wednesday	2–0	Barnsley	Sheffield
19:45 GMT	MacDonald 37' (o.g.); Bannan (yellow card) 45+1'; João (yellow card) 50'; Hutchinson 80'	Report	Morsy (yellow card) 40'; Hammill (red card) 82'	Stadium: Hillsborough Stadium; Attendance: 27,248; Referee: Peter Bankes

17 December 2016 22	Cardiff City	3–4	Barnsley	Cardiff
15:00 GMT	Morrison 3'; Noone (yellow card) 45'; Whittingham 79'; Pilkington 89'	Report	19', 32', (yellow card) 59' Winnall; (yellow card) 42' Yiadom; 43' Scowen; (yellow card) 53' Davies; (yellow card) 87' MacDonald; 90+5' Williams	Stadium: Cardiff City Stadium; Attendance: 14,754; Referee: Tony Harrington

26 December 2016 23	Barnsley	2–0	Blackburn Rovers	Barnsley
15:00 GMT	Winnall 14'; Morsy (yellow card) 83'; Watkins 90+3'	Report	(yellow card) 63' Mulgrew; (yellow card) 67' Akpan; (red card) 86' Lenihan	Stadium: Oakwell; Attendance: 14,192; Referee: Andy Madley

31 December 2016 24	Barnsley	2–2	Birmingham City	Barnsley
15:00 GMT	Bradshaw 24'; Winnall 28'; Roberts (red card) 51'; Hourihane (yellow card) 61'; Morsy (yellow card) 87'	Report	Maghoma 33'; Jutkiewicz 52' (pen.)	Stadium: Oakwell Stadium; Attendance: 13,397; Referee: Scott Duncan

2 January 2017 25	Nottingham Forest	0–1	Barnsley	Nottingham
15:00 GMT	Lam (yellow card) 32'	Report	88' Hourihane	Stadium: The City Ground; Attendance: 22,105; Referee: James Linington

14 January 2017 26	Fulham	2–0	Barnsley	London
15:00 GMT	Martin 45+2' (pen.); Malone 55'	Report	(yellow card) 53' Aidy White; (yellow card) 73' Watkins	Stadium: Craven Cottage; Attendance: 18,010; Referee: Andy Davies

21 January 2017 27	Barnsley	3–2	Leeds United	Barnsley
17:30 GMT	Hourihane (yellow card) 21' (goal) 54'; Bradshaw 45'; Kent 48'; Watkins (yellow card) 66'; Scowen (yellow card) 67'; Armstrong (yellow card) 82'	Report	Wood 18', 68' (pen.); Roofe (yellow card) 53'; Bartley (yellow card) 57'; O'Kane (yellow card) 70'	Stadium: Oakwell Stadium; Attendance: 17,817; Referee: Mike Dean

28 January 2017 28	Rotherham United	0–1	Barnsley	Rotherham
15:00 GMT	Mattock (yellow card) 16'	Report	Kent (yellow card) 25'; Armstrong 70'	Stadium: AESSEAL New York Stadium; Attendance: 11,050; Referee: Keith Stroud

31 January 2017 29	Barnsley	1–3	Wolverhampton Wanderers	Barnsley
19:45 GMT	MacDonald (yellow card) 35'; Mowatt (red card) 42'; Roberts 80'	Report	Hause 5'; Coady (yellow card) 18'; Batth (yellow card) 28'; Edwards 36', 77' (yellow card) 65'; Weimann (yellow card) 90+3'	Stadium: Oakwell; Attendance: 11,808; Referee: Christopher Kavanagh

4 February 2017 30	Barnsley	0–0	Preston North End	Barnsley
15:00 GMT	Scowen (yellow card) 58'	Report	McGeady (yellow card) 64'; Pearson (yellow card) 79'; Browne (yellow card) 88'; Cunningham (yellow card) 90+3'	Stadium: Oakwell; Attendance: 12,590; Referee: Oliver Langford

11 February 2017 31	Reading	0–0	Barnsley	Reading
15:00 GMT	Obita (yellow card) 34'; Gunter (yellow card) 69'	Report	Jones (yellow card) 61'; Armstrong (yellow card) 90+4'	Stadium: Madejski Stadium; Attendance: 16,222; Referee: Darren Bond

14 February 2017 32	Aston Villa	1–3	Barnsley	Birmingham
19:45 GMT	Kodjia 44'	Report	Armstrong 25' (pen.); Watkins (yellow card) 30'; Bradshaw 43', 58'; Kent (yellow card) 60'	Stadium: Villa Park; Attendance: 26,435; Referee: Geoff Eltringham

18 February 2017 33	Barnsley	0–2	Brighton & Hove Albion	Barnsley
15:00 GMT		Report	Baldock (yellow card) 5' (goal) 53', 68'	Stadium: Oakwell; Attendance: 12,743; Referee: David Coote

25 February 2017 34	Barnsley	1–1	Huddersfield Town	Barnsley
15:00 GMT	Jones (yellow card) 24'; Davies (yellow card) 90+1'	Report	Hefele 18'; Mooy (yellow card) 25'; Smith (yellow card) 41'; Whitehead (yellow card) 52'; Billing (yellow card) 68'; Brown (yellow card) 90+1'	Stadium: Oakwell; Attendance: 18,075; Referee: Tim Robinson

4 March 2017 35	Derby County	2–1	Barnsley	Derby
15:00 GMT	Ince 54'; Nugent 76' (yellow card) 90+2'	Report	Yiadom (yellow card) 27'; James 52'; Scowen (yellow card) 58'	Stadium: iPro Stadium; Attendance: 30,280; Referee: Keith Stroud

7 March 2017 36	Queens Park Rangers	2–1	Barnsley	Shepherd's Bush, London
19:45 GMT	Sylla 7'; Perch (yellow card) 14'; MacDonald 66' (o.g.); Bidwell (yellow card) 83'; Manning (yellow card) 87'	Report	Bradshaw 79'; Hammill (yellow card) 85'	Stadium: Loftus Road; Attendance: 11,635; Referee: Tony Harrington

11 March 2017 37	Barnsley	1–1	Ipswich Town	Barnsley
15:00 GMT	Watkins 58'	Report	Skuse (yellow card) 45'; Lawrence 90+2' (yellow card) 90+2'	Stadium: Oakwell; Attendance: 11,836; Referee: Stephen Martin

18 March 2017 38	Norwich City	2–0	Barnsley	Norwich
15:00 GMT	Murphy 44'; Pinto (yellow card) 62'; MacDonald 71' (o.g.)	Report		Stadium: Carrow Road; Attendance: 26,105; Referee: Darren Bond

1 April 2017 39	Barnsley	1–1	Sheffield Wednesday	Barnsley
12:30 BST	Hammill (yellow card) 61'; Kent (yellow card) 76'; MacDonald 90+2' (yellow card) 90+3'	Report	Winnall 50' (yellow card) 75'; Reach (yellow card) 90+1'; Hunt (yellow card) 90+1'	Stadium: Oakwell; Attendance: 18,003; Referee: Kevin Friend

4 April 2017 40	Barnsley	0–0	Cardiff City	Barnsley
19:45 BST	Janko (yellow card) 76'	Report	Bamba (yellow card) 48'; Connolly (yellow card) 82'; Halford (yellow card) 90+1'	Stadium: Oakwell; Referee: Scott Duncan

8 April 2017 41	Blackburn Rovers	0–2	Barnsley	Blackburn
15:00 BST	Bennett (yellow card) 45+1'; Hoban (yellow card) 67'	Report	Roberts 3'; Watkins 10' (yellow card) 68'	Stadium: Ewood Park; Attendance: 12,347; Referee: Oliver Langford

13 April 2017 42	Wigan Athletic	3–2	Barnsley	Wigan
19:45 BST	MacDonald (yellow card) 45'; Powell 71', 72', 82' (pen.); Burn (yellow card) 78'; Hanson (yellow card) 90'	Report	Armstrong 42'; Watkins (yellow card) 49'; Janko (yellow card) 53'; Kent 59'; Jones (yellow card) 76'; MacDonald (yellow card) 78'	Stadium: DW Stadium; Attendance: 10,838; Referee: Simon Hooper

17 April 2017 43	Barnsley	1–1	Brentford	Barnsley
15:00 BST	Watkins 28'; MacDonald (yellow card) 60'	Report	Jozefzoon 41'	Stadium: Oakwell; Attendance: 13,935; Referee: Robert Jones

22 April 2017 44	Bristol City	3–2	Barnsley	Bristol
15:00 BST	Smith (yellow card) 42'; Abraham 53'; Paterson 69'; Flint 74'	Report	Scowen (yellow card) 34'; Mowatt 37'; Moncur 64'	Stadium: Ashton Gate Stadium; Attendance: 18,617; Referee: Scott Duncan

29 April 2017 45	Barnsley	1–1	Burton Albion	Barnsley
15:00 BST	Jones (yellow card) 32'; Moncur 38'	Report	Flanagan (yellow card) 49'; Varney 52' (yellow card) 85'	Stadium: Oakwell; Attendance: 12,952; Referee: Jeremy Simpson

7 May 2017 46	Newcastle United	3–0	Barnsley	Newcastle upon Tyne
12:00 BST	Pérez 23'; Shelvey (yellow card) 26'; Mbemba 59'; Gayle 90'	Report		Stadium: St James' Park; Attendance: 52,276; Referee: James Linington

=== FA Cup ===
7 January 2017 Third round	Blackpool	0–0	Barnsley	Blackpool
15:00 GMT		Report	Scowen (yellow card) 63'	Stadium: Bloomfield Road; Attendance: 4,875; Referee: Chris Sarginson

17 January 2017 Third round replay	Barnsley	1–2 (a.e.t.)	Blackpool	Barnsley
19:45 GMT	Scowen (yellow card) 45+1'; MacDonald 49' (yellow card) 112'; Hammill (yellow card) 65'	Report	Mellor 30'; Aldred (yellow card) 66'; Osayi-Samuel (yellow card) 80' (goal) 120+1'	Stadium: Oakwell; Attendance: 5,558; Referee: Roger East

=== EFL Cup ===
9 August 2016 First round	Barnsley	1–2 (a.e.t.)	Northampton Town	Barnsley, South Yorkshire
19:45 BST	Scowen 21'	Report	Potter (yellow card) 46'; Davies 52' (o.g.); Phillips (yellow card) 75'; O'Toole (yellow card) 81' (goal) 114'	Stadium: Oakwell; Attendance: 4,455 (322 away)

== Summary ==
Final League Position	14th
Total League Points	58
League Goal Difference	-3
Top scorer	Adam Hammill (11)
Most appearances	Adam Davies (45)
Worst Discipline	Josh Scowen, Marley Watkins (8 (yellow card) , 1 (red card) )
Games played	49 (46 Championship, 2 FA Cup, 1 League Cup)
Games won	15 (15 Championship, 0 FA Cup, 0 League Cup)
Games drawn	14 (13 Championship, 1 FA Cup, 0 League Cup)
Games lost	20 (18 Championship, 1 FA Cup, 1 League Cup)
Goals scored	66 (64 Championship, 1 FA Cup, 1 League Cup)
Goals conceded	71 (67 Championship, 2 FA Cup, 2 League Cup)
Clean sheets	15 (14 Championship, 1 FA Cup, 0 League Cup)
Yellow cards	77 (73 Championship, 4 FA Cup, 0 League Cup)
Red cards	5 (5 Championship, 0 FA Cup, 0 League Cup)
Best result	4–0 vs Rotherham United (27 Aug 16); 4–0 vs Wolverhampton Wanderers (13 Sep 2016)
Worst result	2–5 vs Nottingham Forest (25 Nov 16); 0–3 vs Newcastle United (7 May 2017)
