= List of Salford City F.C. seasons =

Salford City Football Club is a professional association football club based in Salford, Greater Manchester, England. The club competes in League Two, the fourth level of the English football league system. The club was founded as Salford Central in 1940, and played minor local league football until winning a place in the Manchester League in 1963. Salford were winners of the Lancashire Amateur Cup in 1971, 1973, and 1975 and the Manchester Premier Cup in 1978 and 1979. The club joined the Cheshire County League in 1980, which amalgamated into the North West Counties Football League (NWCFL) two years later. They changed their name again in 1989, to Salford City, and secured promotion into the Northern Premier League (NPL) in 2008. The club survived in the league on the final day of the following season, an achievement known in club folklore as The Great Escape.

In 2014, Salford were taken over by former Manchester United players Nicky Butt, Ryan Giggs, Gary Neville, Phil Neville, and Paul Scholes, with Singaporean businessman Peter Lim owning the rest; David Beckham purchased a 10% share from Lim in 2019. In August 2024 Gary Neville acquired Lim's stake in the club, and on 8 May 2025 the Club announced it had been acquired by an ownership group, led by David Beckham and Gary Neville, including US-based businessman Declan Kelly and Mervyn Davies, Baron Davies of Abersoch. Salford play their home games at Moor Lane, which underwent a major transformation between 2016 and 2017, and is currently known as the "Peninsula Stadium" for sponsorship purposes. The club have primarily worn tangerine shirts and black shorts throughout their recorded history, before switching to red shirts and white shorts following the takeover. The club's nickname, The Ammies, stems from their name from the early 1960s to the early 1970s, Salford Amateurs. The club's anthem is The Pogues cover of "Dirty Old Town", a song written by Salford local Ewan MacColl.

== Key ==
Key to seasons

- League Two = EFL League Two
- National League
- National League North
- NPL Premier Division = Northern Premier League Premier Division
- NPL Division One North = Northern Premier League Division One North
- NWCFL Division One = North West Counties Football League Division One

Key to symbols and positions

- 1st = Winners
- 2nd = Runners-up
- ↑ = Promoted
- ↓ = Relegated

Key to rounds

- EPR = Extra Preliminary Round
- PRE = Preliminary Round
- QR1 = First Qualifying Round
- QR2 = Second Qualifying Round
- QR3 = Third Qualifying Round
- QR4 = Fourth Qualifying Round
- R1 = First Round
- R2 = Second Round
- R3 = Third Round
- R4 = Fourth Round
- R5 = Fifth Round
- QF = Quarter-finals
- SF = Semi-finals
- RU = Runners-up
- W = Winners
- Group Stage
- R32 = Round of 32
- R16 = Round of 16

== Seasons ==
List of seasons, including league division and statistics, cup results and top scorer
Season	League										FA Cup	EFL Cup	FA Trophy	EFL Trophy	Other		Top goalscorer	
Season	Division	Lvl	P	W	D	L	F	A	Pts	Pos	FA Cup	EFL Cup	FA Trophy	EFL Trophy	Competition	Result	Name	Goals
1990–91	NWCFL Division One ↓	9	36	6	10	20	30	68	28	19th	–	–	–	–			–	–
1991–92	NWFCL Division Two ↑	10	34	14	9	11	57	41	51	7th		–	–	–			–	–
1992–93	NWFCL Division One	9	42	15	13	14	58	61	58	9th	–	–	–	–			–	–
1993–94	NWCFL Division One	9	42	11	10	21	50	67	43	18th	–	–	–	–			–	–
1994–95	NWCFL Division One	9	42	9	9	24	45	85	36	21st	–	–	–	–			–	–
1995–96	NWCFL Division One	9	42	10	5	27	49	93	35	20th	–	–	–	–			–	–
1996–97	NWCFL Division One	9	42	8	12	22	53	82	36	22nd	–	–	–	–			–	–
1997–98	NWCFL Division One	9	42	13	4	25	64	92	43	18th	–	–	–	–			–	–
1998–99	NWCFL Division One	9	40	15	7	18	63	73	52	10th	–	–	–	–			–	–
1999–2000	NWCFL Division One	9	42	17	7	18	70	69	58	11th	–	–	–	–			–	–
2000–01	NWCFL Division One	9	42	23	10	9	87	41	79	7th	–	–	–	–			–	–
2001–02	NWCFL Division One	9	44	29	10	5	91	40	97	3rd	–	–	–	–			–	–
2002–03	NWCFL Division One	9	42	17	12	13	84	63	63	9th	–	–	–	–			–	–
2003–04	NWCFL Division One	9	42	14	11	17	62	66	53	15th	PRE	–	–	–	FA Vase	QR2	–	–
2004–05	NWCFL Division One	9	42	11	9	22	68	90	42	18th	PRE	–	–	–	FA Vase	R3	–	–
2005–06	NWCFL Division One	9	42	23	10	9	79	46	79	5th	QR3	–	–	–	FA Vase	R1	–	–
2006–07	NWCFL Division One	9	42	26	9	7	103	55	87	4th	EPR	–	–	–	FA Vase	R2	–	–
2007–08	NWCFL Division One ↑	9	38	26	6	6	75	35	84	2nd	PRE	–	–	–	FA Vase	T4	–	–
2008–09	NPL Division One North	8	40	10	6	24	59	107	36	20th	QR2	–	QR1	–			Steve Foster	17
2009–10	NPL Division One North	8	40	16	8	18	63	74	56	11th	QR3	–	QR3	–			–	–
2010–11	NPL Division One North	8	44	17	11	16	68	73	62	12th	QR1	–	PRE	–			–	–
2011–12	NPL Division One North	8	42	14	10	18	69	73	52	13th	PRE	–	QR2	–			–	–
2012–13	NPL Division One North	8	42	11	13	18	65	79	46	16th	QR2	–	PRE	–			–	–
2013–14	NPL Division One North	8	42	15	7	20	68	80	52	12th	PRE	–	PRE	–			Mark Battersby	11
2014–15	NPL Division One North ↑	8	42	30	5	7	92	42	95	1st	QR2	–	PRE	–			Gareth Seddon	24
2015–16	NPL Premier Division (Note: Promoted via play-offs) ↑	7	46	27	9	10	94	48	90	3rd	R2	–	QR1	–			Danny Webber	16
2016–17	National League North (Note: Lost in play-off semi-final to FC Halifax Town, 2–3 on aggregate)	6	42	22	11	9	79	44	77	4th	QR3	–	QR3	–			Mike Phenix	16
2017–18	National League North ↑	6	42	28	7	7	80	45	91	1st	QR2	–	QR3	–			Jack Redshaw	17
2018–19	National League (Note: Promoted after beating AFC Fylde, 3–0 in the play-off final) ↑	5	46	25	10	11	77	45	85	3rd	R1	–	R3	–			Adam Rooney	21
2019–20	League Two	4	37	13	11	13	49	46	50	11th (Note: Fixtures were suspended on 13 March 2020 due to the COVID-19 pandemic. Clubs later voted to curtail the season, with the final league table determined on a points-per-game basis. As a result, Salford City finished 11th in EFL League Two.)	R1	R1	–	Winners			Adam Rooney	9
2020–21	League Two	4	46	19	14	13	54	34	71	8th	R2	R2	–	R2			Ian Henderson	18
2021–22	League Two	4	46	19	13	14	60	46	70	10th	R2	R1	–	Group stage			Brandon Thomas-Asante	13
2022–23	League Two	4	46	22	9	15	72	54	75	7th	R1	R1	–	Quarter-finals			Conor McAleny, Matt Smith	9
2023–24	League Two	4	46	13	12	21	66	82	51	20th	R1	R3	–	Group stage			Matt Smith	14
2024–25	League Two	4	46	18	15	13	64	54	69	8th	R3	R1	–	Group stage			Cole Stockton	11
2025–26	League Two (Note: Lost to Notts County, 3–0 in the play-off final)	4	46	25	6	15	61	51	81	4th	R4	R1	–	R32			Daniel Udoh	10
