= Adam Hammill =

English footballer (born 1988)

Personal information
- Full name: Adam James Hammill
- Date of birth: 25 January 1988 (age 38)
- Place of birth: Liverpool, England
- Height: 1.80 m (5 ft 11 in)
- Position: Winger

Team information
- Current team: Maghull

Youth career
- 1995–2006: Liverpool

Senior career*
Years	Team	Apps	(Gls)
2006–2009	Liverpool	0	(0)
2007	→ Dunfermline Athletic (loan)	13	(1)
2007–2008	→ Southampton (loan)	25	(0)
2008	→ Blackpool (loan)	22	(1)
2009	→ Barnsley (loan)	14	(1)
2009–2011	Barnsley	64	(12)
2011–2013	Wolverhampton Wanderers	23	(0)
2012	→ Middlesbrough (loan)	10	(0)
2012–2013	→ Huddersfield Town (loan)	16	(2)
2013–2015	Huddersfield Town	50	(4)
2015	→ Rotherham United (loan)	14	(0)
2015–2018	Barnsley	100	(7)
2018–2019	St Mirren	13	(4)
2019–2020	Scunthorpe United	18	(1)
2019	→ Stockport County (loan)	4	(0)
2020–2021	Derry City	11	(1)
2021–2022	Litherland REMCYA	0	(0)
2022	Prescot Cables	10	(0)
2023–	Maghull	9	(5)
Total		416	(39)

International career
2006–2007	England U19	7	(2)
2011	England U21	1	(0)
- * Club domestic league appearances and goals as of 12:30, 7 November 2022

Adam James Hammill (born 25 January 1988) is an English footballer who plays as a winger for Maghull. Hammill represented England U21s, though he also qualified to play for the Republic of Ireland at international level.

Hammill is a product of the Liverpool academy, but failed to make a league appearance for the club at senior level, before leaving to join Championship side Barnsley in 2009. After a successful period at Barnsley, he entered the Premier League when he moved to Wolverhampton Wanderers in 2011, with whom he remained until 2013.

In 2015, Hammill returned to Barnsley on a short-term contract but remained until 2018.

== Club career ==
=== Liverpool ===
Hammill was born in Liverpool and was a member of the Youth Academy at Liverpool since he joined the club at age nine. After appearing for the youth and reserves teams, he was promoted to Melwood on a full-time basis. He was part of the Liverpool team that defeated Manchester City in the 2006 FA Youth Cup final. While at the academy, Hammill initially played as an attacking midfielder and striker. But he turned "around 14 or 15", Hammill converted to a winger after being convinced by Academy Manager Steve Heighway, a position both he and Heighway, himself, played today.

In January 2007, he got his first taste of senior football when he was loaned to Scottish side Dunfermline Athletic until the end of the season. He played eighteen games for Dunfermline, including the Scottish Cup final, and scored once against Celtic. After his loan spell at Dunfermline Athletic came to an end, Hammill stated playing in Scotland benefited him, due to playing in the final and more first team opportunity.

He spent the 2007–08 season on loan at Championship side Southampton. Hammill hoped joining Southampton could benefit him for first team experience, as well as making a breakthrough. While in his first two months at Southampton, Hammill signed a three-year contract with his parent club, Liverpool, keeping him until 2011. Hammill made his Southampton debut, where he came on as a substitute for Jhon Viáfara, in the 63rd minute, in a 4–1 loss against Crystal Palace. By November, Hammill made two starts and came on from the substitute bench six times, and as a result he was sent to the reserves or remained on the substitute bench. Having regained his first team place, Hammill then provided two assists for the club, as Southampton beat Hull City 4– 0 on 8 December 2007. Throughout the season, Hammill remained in the first team spotlight at Southampton, as he made 28 appearances in total.

Returning to Anfield, he signed a new five-year contract with Liverpool in July 2008, before being sent out on loan for a sixth time; joining Blackpool in a six-month deal. He made his debut for the Seasiders on 9 August 2008, where he played 90 minutes in a 1–0 home defeat to Bristol City. In the next game against Norwich City on 16 August 2008, Hammill won a penalty in the 55th minute, which Ben Burgess successfully converted, in a 1–1 draw. He scored his first goal in English football for the Seasiders on 16 November in the West Lancashire derby 3–1 home defeat to Preston. After a successful loan spell he returned to Liverpool on 30 December, where Rafael Benítez would decide whether or not Hammill would return to Bloomfield Road despite keen on using him in the Liverpool first team.

=== Barnsley ===
He did have a second loan deal during the 2008–09 season, but it was instead with Barnsley, whom he joined in February 2009 for the remainder of the campaign. Hammill made his Barnsley debut in his first spell on 17 February 2009, where he came on as a substitute for Andranik Teymourian in the 80th minute, in a 1–0 win over Sheffield Wednesday. Having become a first team regular throughout the season, Hammill scored his first Barnsley goal while on loan, in the last game of the season, in a 2–1 win over Plymouth Argyle. After the match, Hammill returned to his parent club.

Following his loan spell at Oakwell in Spring 2009, Barnsley launched a bid which was turned down as Liverpool wanted to see what Hammill could offer during pre-season. However, Hammill remained out of the Liverpool first team after yet being given a squad number despite playing in a friendly match, which he scored. Barnsley then made a second bid, which Liverpool, this time, accepted and Hammill signed a three-year contract on 10 August 2009. Though he has no regrets leaving Liverpool for Barnsley, Hammill, however, said Liverpool will forever be in his blood.

Hammill's first game after signing for the club on a permanent basis came on 11 August 2009 in a League Cup first round tie, with a 1–0 win at Lincoln City. He scored his first goal of the 2009 season for Barnsley, away at Derby County, as the Reds recorded their first win of the season under new manager Mark Robins. Hammill's goal was a curling effort from the edge of the box that won him the club's Goal of the Year Award for 2009. Two weeks later on 29 September 2009, Hammill scored his second Barnsley goal, in a 3–1 win over West Brom Albion, followed up by the third and fourth goal against Doncaster Rovers on 17 October 2009 and Bristol City on 24 October 2009 Four days later on 28 October 2009, Hammill was fouled by Manchester United's Gary Neville, which saw him sent-off, as Barnsley lose 2–0 in the last-16 of League Cup. Throughout the 2009–10 season, Hammill remained in the first team, which he made forty–three appearances and scoring four times in all competitions.

At the start of the 2010–11 season, Hammill started the season well he scored four goals in the first nine matches against Bristol City, Middlesbrough, Leeds United (which he also has a hat-trick assist during the match) and Derby County. Hammill then provided a double assist on 16 October 2010, in a 3–1 win over Nottingham Forest. Hammill added four more goals against Hull City, Preston North End, Portsmouth and Burnley. By the first half of the season, Hammill scored eight times in twenty–five appearances for the club, which he describe the 2010–11 season as a best season as professional.

His performance soon attracted interests from Premier League clubs.

=== Wolverhampton Wanderers ===
Eventually, on 20 January 2011, Hammill signed for Premier League side Wolverhampton Wanderers on a three-and-a-half-year contract after Wolves triggered a £500,000 buy-out clause in his contract. Hammill was previously linked with a move to Premier League's rival and his former club, Blackpool, before joining Wolverhampton Wanderers.

He made his Wolves debut as a substitute against boyhood and former club Liverpool two days later. He made ten appearances in total for the club during the remainder of the season, but found himself on the sidelines towards the end of the campaign as manager Mick McCarthy recalled the more experienced Stephen Hunt.

Ahead of the 2011–12 season, Hammill expressed determination to fight for his first team place at Wolverhampton Wanderers. The 2011–12 season saw Hammill making his first appearance of the season, playing 89th minutes, in a 4–0 win over Northampton in the first round of League Cup. Hammill then scored his first – and only goal – for Wolves, when he netted a free-kick in a League Cup tie against Millwall. However, although he made a series of substitute appearances in the Premier League during the first half of the season he was unable to establish himself in the team.

On 1 March 2012, he was sent on loan to Championship side Middlesbrough on an emergency loan deal until the end of the season. He made his debut two days later in a 3–1 away victory against Portsmouth, but he finished the campaign mostly on the substitutes bench before returning to Wolves.

Wolves had suffered relegation to the Championship at the end of the season, and now appointed Ståle Solbakken as their new manager. However this change of manager did not improve Hammill's involvement in Wolves' first team and he was again made available for loan. As a result, Hammill was placed on a transfer list.

Following his loan spell at Huddersfield Town came to an end, Hammill made four final appearances for Wolves, appearing as a substitute in a series of matches in the final months of the 2012–13 season as the club battled unsuccessfully under new manager Dean Saunders to avoid a second relegation. In total he made 27 appearances for Wolves, scoring once, before his time at Molineux ended as Kenny Jackett arrived as manager.

=== Huddersfield Town ===
Shortly before the end of the transfer window on 31 August 2012, he joined fellow Championship side Huddersfield Town in a loan deal to last until 13 January 2013. He made his Huddersfield début as a substitute in a 2–2 draw at Ipswich the following day, and scored his first goal for the club minutes after coming on as a substitute in a 1–3 loss at Peterborough on 23 October 2012. His only other goal for the Terriers happened to be his final kick of his loan spell with a last minute equaliser against Birmingham City in January 2013. Shortly after, Hammill was recalled by the club.

On 24 June 2013, Hammill rejoined Huddersfield Town in a permanent deal for an undisclosed fee, signing a three-year deal (with a further year's option) with the Terriers. Upon joining the club, Hammill was given number twelve shirt. He made his second debut for the club as a substitute in the 1–0 defeat by Nottingham Forest on 3 August 2013. He scored his first goal in his second spell in the 5–1 win over AFC Bournemouth on 24 August 2013, and three days later, on 27 August 2013, Hammill scored again, which turned out to be a winning goal, in a 3–2 win over Charlton Athletic in the second round of League Cup. His impressive performance then earned him October Player of the Month. Hammill later scored three more goals later in the season against Barnsley, Blackburn Rovers and Middlesbrough. In an aftermath 2–1 loss against Wigan Athletic, Hammill was fined by the club after expressing frustrating when he was substituted. Since returning to the club, Hammill has excelled in the new 3–5–2 formation as a right wing-back. Despite suffering ankle injury, Hammill went on to make forty–nine appearances and scoring five times and assisting twelve times in all competitions.

In the 2014–15 season, Hammill played four times at the start of the season. However, Hammill felt out of favour with Huddersfield Town manager Chris Powell, and subsequently was dropped from the team's match-day squad, as well as, his own injury concern. Even after returning to training, Hammill was sent to play in the club's reserve for several matches throughout 2014. After four months absent, Hammill made his first appearance when he come on as a substitute in the 84th minute, in a 2–1 win over Bolton Wanderers on 28 December 2014.

After being told he can leave Huddersfield Town in the January transfer window, it was announced on 9 January 2015, he joined fellow Championship side Rotherham United on loan for the rest of the season. Hammill made his Rotherham United debut the next day, playing the whole 90 minutes, in a 1–0 loss against Brentford. Despite missing some games due to being ineligibile to face his parent club, Hammill helped the club survive relegation and made fourteen appearances for the club. Hammill returned to his parent club after Rotherham United made it clear to Hammill that they would not sign him on a permanent basis.

Though he made five appearances at the start of the 2015–16 season, which saw his shirt number changed from twelve to twenty-five, it was announced on 1 September 2015, he was released by Football League Championship side Huddersfield Town by mutual consent. After leaving the club, Hammill went on trials at Bolton Wanderers, Partick Thistle and Barnsley.

=== Return to Barnsley ===
On 9 November 2015 it was confirmed that Hammill had re-joined Barnsley on a short-term deal.

On his second debut for the club he scored the winning goal in a 2–1 win the Quarter-Final of Football League Trophy tie against York City. Hammill then scored his second goal against Wigan Athletic and Barnsley won 4–2 on penalties after the game was played for 120 minutes in the Semi-Final of Football League Trophy. Following this, Hammill signed a contract with the club. Shortly signing a contract with Barnsley, Hammill scored his first league goal since 2010, in a 3–2 win over Colchester United on 12 December 2015. Three weeks later on 2 January 2016, Hammill scored again, in a 2- 1 in over Millwall and provided two assists, including Sam Winnall's goal, who scored a hat-trick, in a 6–1 win over Rochdale three weeks later on 23 January 2016. After being sidelined over his fitness, Hammill scored on his return on 7 February 2016, in a 3–0 win over Bury. After serving three match ban following a goalless draw against Bury on 23 February 2016, Hammill then scored the winning goal, in the final of Football League Trophy, in a 3–2 win over Oxford United on 3 April 2016. Six days later on 9 April 2016, Hammill scored in a 2–1 loss against Chesterfield. Hammill went on to play a vital role in the League One play-offs promotion to the Championship when he scored two times in three appearances against Walsall in the second leg and the final against Millwall. On his return to Barnsley in his third spell, Hammill made thirty-three appearances and scoring nine times in all competitions.

On 14 June 2016, after a successful short-term deal with the club, Hammill signed a 2-year contract with the club that will run to the summer of 2018. Upon signing a contract, Hammill revealed he turned down a move to Bristol City, citing family reason. Hammill started well at the start of the season, with Barnsley started well in a good form and scored his first goal of the season, in a 4–0 win over Rotherham United on 27 August 2016, and scoring again three weeks later on 13 September 2016, in a 4–0 win over Wolves.

He was released by Barnsley at the end of the 2017–18 season.

=== St Mirren ===
On 2 October 2018, Hammill joined Scottish Premiership club St Mirren on a short-term contract until January 2019. He had to be substituted after 35 minutes of his debut, a 4–1 defeat at Aberdeen, as he suffered an injury to his shoulder. On 24 November he scored both goals in a 2–0 win over Hearts.

=== Scunthorpe United ===
On 3 January 2019, Hammill signed for Scunthorpe United on an 18-month deal. He would later join Stockport County on loan.

=== Derry City ===
On 23 July 2020, Hammill signed for League of Ireland team Derry City. By October 2021 he was a free agent.

=== Prescot Cables ===
In July 2022 he signed for Prescot Cables.

On 6 November 2022, Hammill announced his retirement from football.

On 10 February 2023, Hammill came out of retirement and re-signed for Prescot Cables.

=== Maghull ===
In July 2023 he signed for Maghull.

== International career ==
At international level, Hammill is eligible to represent the country of birth England as well as Republic of Ireland through his grand parents, he has to date represented England at youth level being capped at both U19 and U21 level. Along with then Liverpool teammates Craig Lindfield and Paul Anderson, Hammill was called up for the England under-19 team in 2006, and scored his first Under-19 international goal in the win against Switzerland in November 2006.

On 27 March 2011, Hammill was called up to the England U21 squad for the first time, as Stuart Pearce had a number of injuries and made the decision to rest some key players. He is in the squad to face both Denmark and Iceland. He went on to make his U21 debut against Iceland, coming on as a substitute in the 74th minute.

On 28 March 2011, it was confirmed that Hammill is eligible to play for the Republic of Ireland national side through his late grandfather.

== Personal life ==
Hammill grew up supporting Liverpool, which he went on to play for the club's academy and in the first team. Hammill said he grew up idolising Ryan Giggs and Michael Owen.

During his time at Barnsley, Hammill resided "an apartment just a few miles away from Oakwell Stadium ". In 2010, Hammill was engaged to his fiancée, Ashleigh, but soon broken off. He is a father of two children, a daughter and a son.

In the early hours of 7 October 2012, Hammill was involved in an altercation outside a Liverpool nightclub while celebrating a friend's birthday and was arrested for assaulting two female paramedics. The paramedics had attended the scene after Hammill had collapsed inside the club drunk and been taken outside. He was formally charged with two counts of assault on 27 October, to which he pleaded guilty on 12 November. On 20 November 2012 he was sentenced to 12 weeks of jail suspended for 12 months, 150 hours of unpaid work and to pay £350 to each of the paramedics. Hammill later told the Huddersfield Examiner that he regretted his actions.

== Career statistics ==
As of match played 26 November 2019

Appearances and goals by club, season and competition
Club	Season	League			National Cup		League Cup		Other		Total	
Club	Season	Division	Apps	Goals	Apps	Goals	Apps	Goals	Apps	Goals	Apps	Goals
Liverpool	2006–07	Premier League	0	0	0	0	0	0	0	0	0	0
Liverpool	2007–08	Premier League	0	0	0	0	0	0	0	0	0	0
Liverpool	2008–09	Premier League	0	0	0	0	0	0	0	0	0	0
Liverpool	Total		0	0	0	0	0	0	0	0	0	0
Dunfermline Athletic (loan)	2006–07	Scottish Premier League	13	1	5	0	0	0	—		18	1
Southampton (loan)	2007–08	Championship	25	0	3	0	0	0	—		28	0
Blackpool (loan)	2008–09	Championship	22	1	0	0	1	0	—		23	1
Barnsley (loan)	2008–09	Championship	14	1	0	0	—		—		14	1
Barnsley	2009–10	Championship	39	4	1	0	3	0	—		43	4
Barnsley	2010–11	Championship	25	8	1	0	1	0	—		27	8
Barnsley	Total		78	13	2	0	4	0	—		86	13
Wolverhampton Wanderers	2010–11	Premier League	10	0	—		—		—		10	0
Wolverhampton Wanderers	2011–12	Premier League	9	0	1	0	3	1	—		13	1
Wolverhampton Wanderers	2012–13	Championship	4	0	0	0	0	0	—		4	0
Wolverhampton Wanderers	Total		23	0	1	0	3	1	—		27	1
Middlesbrough (loan)	2011–12	Championship	10	0	—		—		—		10	0
Huddersfield Town (loan)	2012–13	Championship	16	2	0	0	0	0	—		16	2
Huddersfield Town	2013–14	Championship	44	4	2	0	3	1	—		49	5
Huddersfield Town	2014–15	Championship	5	0	1	0	2	0	—		8	0
Huddersfield Town	2015–16	Championship	1	0	0	0	1	0	—		2	0
Huddersfield Town	Total		66	6	3	0	6	1	—		75	7
Rotherham United (loan)	2014–15	Championship	14	0	—		—		—		14	0
Barnsley	2015–16	League One	25	4	0	0	—		8 (Note: Five appearances and one goal in Football League Trophy, three appearances and two goals in League One play-offs)	5	33	9
Barnsley	2016–17	Championship	37	3	2	0	1	0	—		40	3
Barnsley	2017–18	Championship	38	0	1	0	3	1	—		42	1
Barnsley	Total		100	7	3	0	4	1	8	5	115	13
St Mirren	2018–19	Scottish Premiership	13	4	0	0	0	0	—		13	4
Scunthorpe United	2018–19	League One	15	1	0	0	0	0	0	0	15	1
Scunthorpe United	2019–20	League Two	3	0	0	0	1	0	0	0	4	0
Scunthorpe United	Total		18	1	0	0	1	0	0	0	19	1
Stockport County (loan)	2019–20	National League	4	0	1	0	—		0	0	5	0
Career total			386	33	18	0	19	3	8	5	431	41

== Honours ==
Liverpool

- FA Youth Cup: 2005–06

Dunfermline Athletic

- Scottish Cup runner-up: 2006–07

Barnsley

- Football League One play-offs: 2016
- Football League Trophy: 2015–16

Individual

- Barnsley Player of the Year: 2015–16
