= Matty Templeton =

English footballer

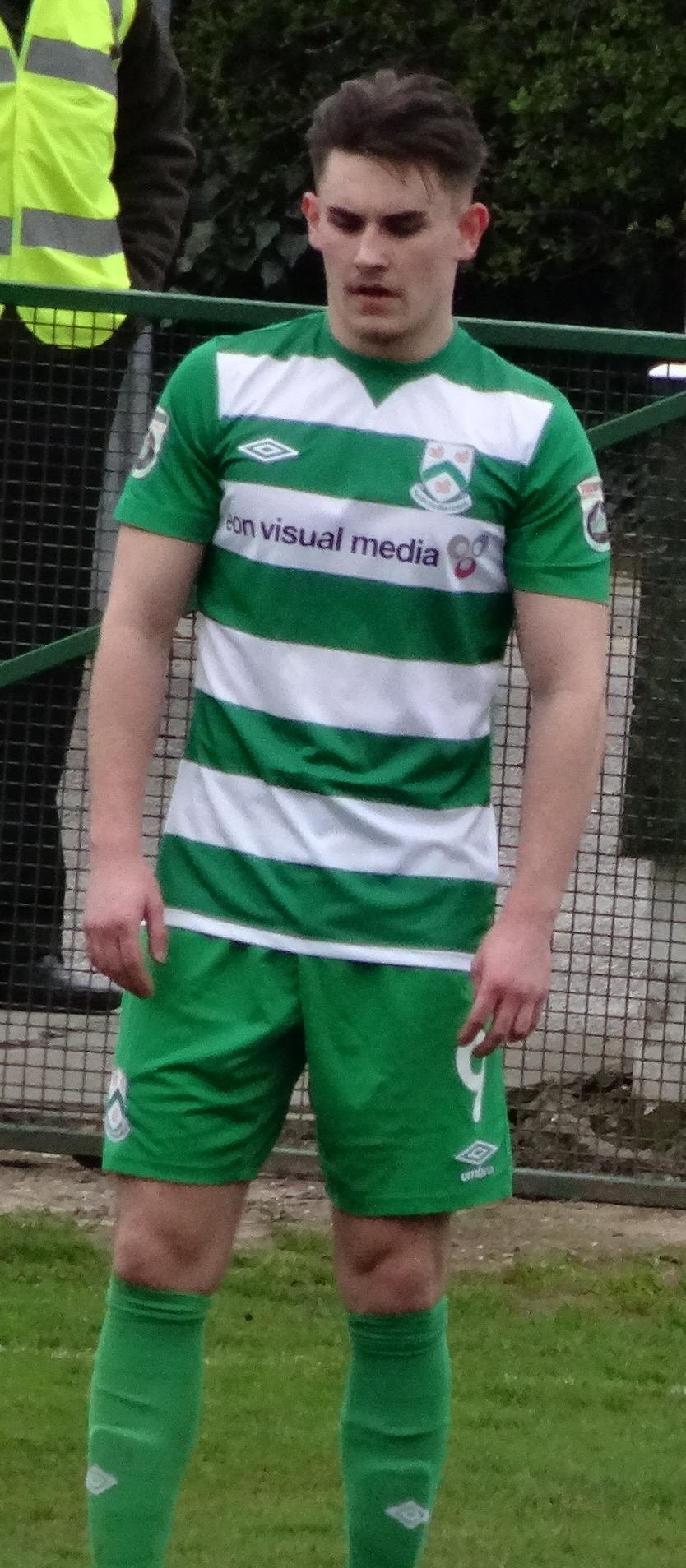
- Templeton playing for North Ferriby United in 2017

Personal information
- Full name: Matthew Templeton
- Date of birth: 28 October 1996 (age 30)
- Place of birth: Worksop, England
- Position: Defender

Team information
- Current team: Matlock Town

Youth career
- –2015: Barnsley

Senior career*
Years	Team	Apps	(Gls)
2015–2017	Barnsley	2	(1)
2016	→ Macclesfield Town (loan)	1	(0)
2016	→ Gainsborough Trinity (loan)	10	(2)
2017	→ North Ferriby United (loan)	7	(0)
2017–	Worksop Town		
2018–	→ Matlock Town (dual registration)		
- * Club domestic league appearances and goals as of 19:29, 19 March 2017 (UTC)

Matthew Templeton (born 28 October 1996) is an English former professional footballer who plays as a defender for Matlock Town.

== Career ==
Templeton began his career with Barnsley progressing through the youth ranks at Oakwell, making his professional debut on 11 August 2015 in a 1–1 draw against Scunthorpe United in the League Cup which Barnsley won on penalties. He made his league debut, also against Scunthorpe, coming on for George Smith on 31 October 2015. He scored his first goal for the club on his third appearance in a 4–2 win against Blackpool on 28 December 2015.

Templeton joined Gainsborough Trinity of the National League North on loan on 6 October 2016. He made his debut the following weekend, scoring the winning goal in a 3–2 victory over Tamworth. After another loan spell at North Ferriby United, he was released by Barnsley in May 2017, before signing for Worksop Town. In January 2018 he joined Matlock Town on dual registration terms.
