= Shaun Tuton =

English footballer (born 1991)

Personal information
- Date of birth: 3 December 1991 (age 34)
- Place of birth: Sheffield, England
- Position: Forward

Senior career*
Years	Team	Apps	(Gls)
20??–20??	Teversal		
20??–20??	Matlock Town		
2012–2013	Belper Town		
2013–2014	Matlock Town		
2014–2015	Buxton		
2015–2016	FC Halifax Town	27	(10)
2016–2018	Barnsley	7	(0)
2016–2017	→ Grimsby Town (loan)	10	(0)
2017	→ Barrow (loan)	12	(1)
2018	→ FC Halifax Town (loan)	7	(0)
2018	Chester	2	(0)
2018–2019	Spennymoor Town	25	(1)
2019	→ Chorley (loan)	5	(0)
2019–2020	Boston United	12	(0)
2020–2021	Alfreton Town	8	(0)
2021–2022	Guiseley	8	(1)
2022	Matlock Town	6	(1)
2022–2023	Belper Town	10	(2)
2023	Whitby Town	10	(2)
2023–2024	Handsworth	22	(1)
2024–2025	Ossett United	3	(0)
2025	Hallam	9	(0)
2025–	Rossington Main	1	(0)
- * Club domestic league appearances and goals as of 08:28, 24 November 2025 (UTC)

Shaun Reece Tuton (born 3 December 1991) is an English professional footballer who plays as a forward.

He has notably played in the Football League with Barnsley and Grimsby Town, as well as spells at non-league level with Teversal, Matlock Town, Belper Town, Buxton, FC Halifax Town, Barrow, Chester, Spennymoor Town, Chorley, Boston United, Alfreton Town, Guiseley and Whitby Town.

== Playing career ==
=== Early career ===
Tuton played lower league football for Teversal, Matlock Town, Belper Town, and Buxton. He trials at Carlisle United in January 2015 and Morecambe in February 2015. He was signed by FC Halifax Town manager Neil Aspin in August 2015. His performances for the "Shaymen" earned him comparison with Jamie Vardy, a striker who played for Halifax before working his way up into the Premier League.

=== Barnsley ===
Tuton was signed by League One side Barnsley in February 2016, getting his chance in the English Football League at the age of 24; Barnsley paid Halifax an undisclosed fee. He made seven appearances for Paul Heckingbottom's "Tykes" in the second half of the 2015–16 season, however failed to break into the first-team picture following the club's promotion into the Championship.

On 31 August 2016, he joined League Two club Grimsby Town on loan until the end of the 2016–17 season.

On 2 February 2017, he joined National League side Barrow on a 93-day loan. However his loan spell at the "Bluebirds" was ended by an ankle injury he picked up during a 2–1 defeat at Maidstone United on 1 April.

He had a trial at Scottish Premiership club Motherwell in July 2017, but "Steelmen" manager Stephen Robinson concluded that "[he] did well as a trialist but I didn't feel he was better than what we had". He joined Port Vale on trial in December 2017, who were managed by former Halifax boss Neil Aspin.

=== Return to Non-league ===
On 20 January 2018, Tuton rejoined FC Halifax Town, this time on a loan deal for the rest of the season. He joined Chester in August 2018. After playing the first few games of the season for Chester he moved to Spennymoor Town.

On 2 October 2021, Tuton signed for Guiseley. In December 2021, Tuton suffered a broken leg that ruled him out of action for five months before re-signing for the 2022–23 season. In September 2022, Tuton returned for a third spell with Matlock Town in his career. Just one month after returning to Matlock Town however, Tuton transferred to another of his former clubs in Belper Town. In February 2023, he joined Whitby Town. Following a wrongful conviction, he was released by Whitby in April 2023.

After his sentence was overturned on appeal due to Tuton being wrongfully convicted, he signed for Handsworth and told the BBC that he was looking to rebuild his career.

== Personal life ==
In March 2023, Tuton was convicted of outraging public decency, appearing at Barnsley Magistrates Court. Following this Whitby Town announced they had released Tuton.

Mr Tuton did appeal and his conviction was quashed during a hearing at Sheffield Crown Court on 20 September 2023. Speaking to the BBC in July 2024 about the case and its impact on him and his family, Tuton described the wrongful conviction as "the toughest time of his life". Tuton told the publication that when he was shown the CCTV footage of the incident, he was "in shock" as he said that the suspect looked "completely different" to him.

After his sentence was overturned on appeal due to Tuton being wrongfully convicted, he resumed his football career, signing for Handsworth

== Statistics ==
As of 24 November 2025.

Appearances and goals by club, season and competition
Club	Season	League			FA Cup		League Cup		Other		Total	
Club	Season	Division	Apps	Goals	Apps	Goals	Apps	Goals	Apps	Goals	Apps	Goals
FC Halifax Town	2015–16	National League	27	10	3	0	—		2 (Note: Appearances in FA Trophy.)	1	32	11
Barnsley	2015–16	League One	7	0	0	0	0	0	0	0	7	0
Barnsley	2016–17	Championship	0	0	0	0	0	0	0	0	0	0
Barnsley	Total		7	0	0	0	0	0	0	0	7	0
Grimsby Town (loan)	2016–17	League Two	10	0	0	0	0	0	2 (Note: Appearances in EFL Trophy.)	0	12	0
Barrow (loan)	2016–17	National League	12	1	0	0	—		2	0	14	1
FC Halifax Town (loan)	2017–18	National League	7	0	0	0	—		0	0	7	0
Chester	2018–19	National League North	2	0	0	0	—		0	0	2	0
Spennymoor Town	2018–19	National League North	25	1	0	0	—		3	0	28	1
Chorley (loan)	2018–19	National League North	5	0	0	0	—		1 (Note: Appearances in National League North play-offs.)	0	6	0
Boston United	2019–20	National League North	12	0	1	0	—		0	0	13	0
Alfreton Town	2019–20	National League North	1	0	0	0	—		0	0	1	0
Alfreton Town	2020–21	National League North	2	0	0	0	—		1	0	3	0
Alfreton Town	2020–21	National League North	5	0	0	0	—		0	0	5	0
Alfreton Town	Total		8	0	0	0	—		1	0	9	0
Guiseley	2021–22	National League North	8	1	1	0	—		0	0	9	1
Matlock Town	2022–23	NPL Premier Division	6	1	0	0	0	0	1	0	7	1
Belper Town	2022–23	NPL Premier Division	10	2	0	0	0	0	1 (Note: Appearances in Derbyshire Senior Cup.)	1	11	3
Whitby Town	2022–23	NPL Premier Division	10	2	0	0	0	0	0	0	10	2
Handsworth	2023–24	NCEFL Premier Division	22	1	0	0	2	0	1 (Note: Appearances in Sheffield & Hallamshire Senior Cup.)	1	25	2
Ossett United	2024–25	NPL Division One East	6	0	0	0	0	0	2	0	8	0
Hallam	2025–26	NPL Division One East	9	0	0	0	0	0	0	0	9	0
Rossington Main	2025–26	NCEFL Premier Division	1	0	0	0	0	0	0	0	1	0
Career total (Note: Statistics for Teversal, Matlock Town, Belper Town, and Buxton not known.)			187	19	5	0	2	0	15	3	210	22
