= 2016 Football League play-offs =

Football League play-offs
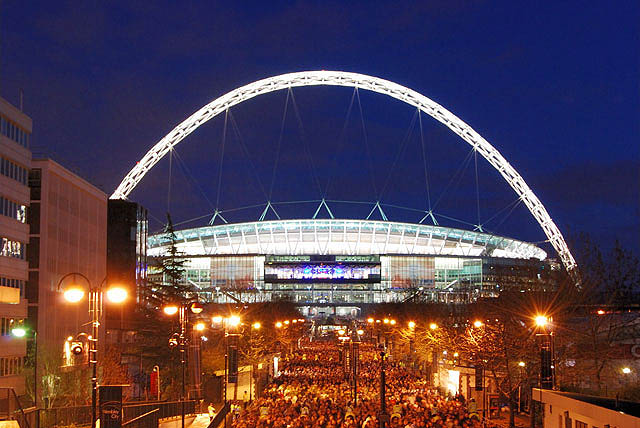
- Wembley Stadium was the venue for each play-off final
- Season: 2015–16
- Champions: Hull City (Championship); Barnsley (League One); AFC Wimbledon (League Two)
- Matches: 15
- Goals: 39 (2.6 per match)
- Biggest home win: Barnsley 3–0 Walsall
- Biggest away win: Derby County 0–3 Hull City
- Highest attendance: 70,189
- Lowest attendance: 4,634
- Average attendance: 26,210

The Football League play-offs for the 2015–16 season (referred to as the Sky Bet Play-Offs for sponsorship reasons) were held in May 2016 with all finals being staged at Wembley Stadium in London.

The play-offs begin at the semi-final stage with all semi-finals being played over two legs, contested by the teams who finished in 3rd, 4th, 5th and 6th place in the Football League Championship and League One and the 4th, 5th, 6th and 7th-placed teams in the League Two table. The winners of the semi-finals then advance to the finals, with the winner of the final gaining promotion for the following season.

== Background ==
The Football League play-offs have been held every year since 1987. They take place for each division following the conclusion of the regular season and are contested by the four clubs finishing below the automatic promotion places.

== Championship ==
=== Semi-finals ===
First leg

13 May 2016
19:45

Sheffield Wednesday	2–0	Brighton & Hove Albion
Wallace 45'; Lee 73'	Report

Hillsborough Stadium, Sheffield
Attendance: 34,260
Referee: Andre Marriner
14 May 2016
12:30

Derby County	0–3	Hull City
	Report	Hernández 30'; Shackell 40' (o.g.); Robertson 90+8'

iPro Stadium, Derby
Attendance: 29,969
Referee: Neil Swarbrick

Second leg

16 May 2016
19:45

Brighton & Hove Albion	1–1	Sheffield Wednesday
Dunk 19'	Report	Wallace 28'

Falmer Stadium, Brighton
Attendance: 27,272
Referee: Roger East

Sheffield Wednesday won 3–1 on aggregate.

17 May 2016
19:45

Hull City	0–2	Derby County
	Report	Russell 7'; Robertson 36' (o.g.)

KC Stadium, Kingston upon Hull
Attendance: 20,470
Referee: Michael Oliver

Hull City won 3–2 on aggregate.

=== Final ===
28 May 2016
17:00

Hull City	1–0	Sheffield Wednesday
Diamé 71'	Report

Wembley Stadium, London
Attendance: 70,189
Referee: Bobby Madley

== League One ==
=== Semi-finals ===
First leg

14 May 2016
17:30

Barnsley	3–0	Walsall
Demetriou 45' (o.g.); Winnall 54', 55'	Report

Oakwell, Barnsley
Attendance: 16,051
Referee: Peter Bankes
15 May 2016
12:15

Bradford City	1–3	Millwall
McMahon 13' (pen.)	Report	Gregory 15'; Morison 34'; J. Martin 45'

Coral Windows Stadium, Bradford
Attendance: 19,241
Referee: Dean Whitestone

Second leg

19 May 2016
19:45

Walsall	1–3	Barnsley
Cook 85'	Report	Hammill 18'; Fletcher 66'; Brownhill 90'

Banks's Stadium, Walsall
Attendance: 8,022
Referee: Darren Deadman

Barnsley won 6–1 on aggregate.

20 May 2016
19:45

Millwall	1–1	Bradford City
Gregory 34'	Report	Proctor 44'

The Den, London
Attendance: 16,301
Referee: Tim Robinson

Millwall won 4–2 on aggregate.

=== Final ===
29 May 2016
15:00

Barnsley	3–1	Millwall
Fletcher 2'; Hammill 19'; Isgrove 74'	Report	Beevers 34'

Wembley Stadium, London
Attendance: 51,277
Referee: Stuart Attwell

== League Two ==
=== Semi-finals ===
First leg

12 May 2016
19:45

Portsmouth	2–2	Plymouth Argyle
McNulty 3'; Roberts 51' (pen.)	Report	Matt 9', 19'

Fratton Park, Portsmouth
Attendance: 17,622
Referee: Oliver Langford
14 May 2016
19:30

AFC Wimbledon	1–0	Accrington Stanley
Beere 90+3'	Report

Kingsmeadow, London
Attendance: 4,870
Referee: Stephen Martin

Second leg

15 May 2016
18:00

Plymouth Argyle	1–0	Portsmouth
Hartley 90+1'	Report

Home Park, Plymouth
Attendance: 15,011
Referee: Paul Tierney

Plymouth Argyle won 3–2 on aggregate.

18 May 2016
19:45

Accrington Stanley	2–2 (a.e.t.)	AFC Wimbledon
Windass 39' (pen.); Mingoia 59'	Report	Akinfenwa 68'; Taylor 104'

Wham Stadium, Accrington
Attendance: 4,634
Referee: Eddie Ilderton

AFC Wimbledon won 3–2 on aggregate.

=== Final ===
30 May 2016
15:00

AFC Wimbledon	2–0	Plymouth Argyle
Taylor 78'; Akinfenwa 90+11' (pen.)	Report

Wembley Stadium, London
Attendance: 57,956
Referee: Iain Williamson
