= Sam Winnall =

English footballer (born 1991)

Personal information
- Full name: Sam Thomas Winnall
- Date of birth: 19 January 1991 (age 35)
- Place of birth: Wolverhampton, England
- Height: 5 ft 9 in (1.75 m)
- Position: Striker

Youth career
- Goodrich
- –2009: Wolverhampton Wanderers

Senior career*
Years	Team	Apps	(Gls)
2009–2013	Wolverhampton Wanderers	0	(0)
2011	→ Burton Albion (loan)	19	(7)
2011	→ Hereford United (loan)	8	(2)
2012	→ Inverness Caledonian Thistle (loan)	2	(0)
2012	→ Shrewsbury Town (loan)	4	(0)
2013–2014	Scunthorpe United	45	(23)
2014–2017	Barnsley	97	(41)
2017–2020	Sheffield Wednesday	36	(5)
2017–2018	→ Derby County (loan)	17	(6)
2020–2022	Oxford United	44	(5)
2022–2023	Burton Albion	16	(3)
Total		288	(93)
- * Club domestic league appearances and goals

Sam Thomas Winnall (born 19 January 1991) is an English former professional footballer who played as a striker.

== Career ==
=== Wolverhampton Wanderers ===
Winnall joined the youth ranks of Wolverhampton Wanderers as a teenager, before signing professional forms in May 2009. He recovered from a cruciate knee injury to make his senior debut on 24 August 2010 in a League Cup victory over Southend United, which was to be his only Wolves first team appearance.

In February 2011 he moved on a month's loan to League Two side Burton Albion, later extended to the end of the season after a run of four goals in six appearances.

The striker went out on loan again, joining League Two side Hereford United on a month's loan from 26 August. After returning to Wolves at its conclusion, he moved on loan again in January 2012, to join Scottish Premier League side Inverness Caledonian Thistle for the rest of the season.

During pre-season for the 2012–13 season Winnall was given permission to undergo a trial with Preston North End but was not offered a contract. Instead his next move was a loan at League One club Shrewsbury Town whom he joined in a one-month deal on 28 September 2012.

At the end of the 2012–13 season his contract with Wolves expired and was not renewed, meaning the striker left the club having made only one first team appearance during his time at Molineux.

=== Scunthorpe United ===
Following a successful trial spell during pre-season, he subsequently signed for League Two club Scunthorpe United in a one-year deal, scoring on his debut on 3 August 2013 against Mansfield Town. He was both Scunthorpe's and League Two's leading scorer in 2013–2014, and was nominated for the latter's Player of the Year Award in March 2014.

Scunthorpe took up a one-year option on his contract in May 2014, extending his deal until 2015. At the same time, Winnall was offered a new contract which – according to Scunthorpe chairman Peter Swann – was a "vast improvement" on his current deal. Swann said: "It's important that the fans know that we do rate him and that we want him to stay here."

=== Barnsley ===
On 23 July 2014, Winnall signed for fellow League One club Barnsley for an undisclosed fee. He scored his first goal for the club on 23 August in a 4–1 win at home to Gillingham. On 8 November 2014, Winnall scored his first senior hat trick, in Barnsley's 5–0 FA Cup first round win over Burton Albion. On 28 January 2016, Barnsley rejected an offer for Winnall from Championship club Leeds United.

Winnall remained at Barnsley and he played a big part in Barnsley's season, including beating Oxford United 3–2 to win the Football League Trophy on 3 April 2016. On 14 May 2016, Winnall's double helped keep Barnsley on course for a return trip to Wembley as a 3–0 first-leg win against Walsall gave them a big advantage in their League One play-off semi-finals. Barnsley went on to beat Walsall 6–1 on aggregate, and then beat Millwall 3–1 in the play-off final at Wembley Stadium to earn promotion to the Championship. He scored 24 goals in all competition, with 23 of them league goals for Barnsley, and contributed 8 assists during the 2015–16 season and finished as the third highest goalscorer in League One behind Will Grigg and Nicky Ajose.

=== Sheffield Wednesday ===
On 13 January 2017, Winnall signed for fellow Championship team Sheffield Wednesday. He scored his first goal for Wednesday in a 3–0 win against Birmingham City on 10 February 2017. In a heated return to Oakwell in April, Winnall scored the opening goal against former club Barnsley. On 31 August 2017, Winnall joined Derby County as part of a loan swap deal for midfielder Jacob Butterfield. He scored his first goal for Derby in a 1–1 draw with Birmingham City on 23 September 2017. His best moment in a Derby shirt was against Ipswich Town when he scored a brace in a 2–1 win on 30 December 2017.

On 24 June 2020, it was announced that he wasn't offered a new contract and would be leaving the club on the 30 June.

=== Oxford United ===
Winnall signed a two-year deal with League One club Oxford United with the option of a third year on 11 September 2020. He scored his first goals for Oxford when he scored twice in an EFL Trophy tie against AFC Wimbledon on 2 February 2021. Winnall was released by the club at the end of the 2021–22 season.

== Career statistics ==
Appearances and goals by club, season and competition
Club	Season	League			Domestic Cup		League Cup		Other		Total	
Club	Season	Division	Apps	Goals	Apps	Goals	Apps	Goals	Apps	Goals	Apps	Goals
Wolverhampton Wanderers	2010–11	Premier League	0	0	0	0	1	0	—		1	0
Burton Albion (loan)	2010–11	League Two	19	7	0	0	—		0	0	19	7
Hereford United (loan)	2011–12	League Two	8	2	0	0	0	0	1 (Note: Appearance(s) in Football League Trophy)	0	9	2
Inverness Caledonian Thistle (loan)	2011–12	Scottish Premier League	2	0	1	0	0	0	—		3	0
Shrewsbury Town (loan)	2012–13	League One	4	0	0	0	0	0	0	0	4	0
Scunthorpe United	2013–14	League Two	45	23	2	0	1	0	1	0	49	23
Barnsley	2014–15	League One	32	9	1	3	1	0	2	1	36	13
Barnsley	2015–16	League One	43	21	1	0	2	1	10 (Note: Seven appearances in Football League Trophy, three appearances and two goals in League One play-offs)	2	56	24
Barnsley	2016–17	Championship	22	11	1	0	0	0	—		23	11
Barnsley	Total		97	41	3	3	3	1	12	3	115	48
Sheffield Wednesday	2016–17	Championship	14	3	—		0	0	1 (Note: Appearance in Championship play-offs)	0	15	3
Sheffield Wednesday	2017–18	Championship	2	1	0	0	1	0	0	0	3	1
Sheffield Wednesday	2018–19	Championship	7	0	1	0	0	0	0	0	8	0
Sheffield Wednesday	2019–20	Championship	13	1	2	1	2	0	0	0	17	2
Sheffield Wednesday	Total		36	5	3	1	3	0	1	0	43	6
Derby County (loan)	2017–18	Championship	17	6	0	0	—		0	0	17	6
Oxford United	2020–21	League One	24	4	1	0	0	0	4 (Note: Three appearances and two goals in EFL Trophy, one appearance in League One play-offs)	2	30	6
Oxford United	2021–22	League One	20	1	0	0	2	0	0	0	22	1
Oxford United	Total		44	5	1	0	2	0	4	2	52	7
Burton Albion	2022–23	League One	16	3	2	2	0	0	2 (Note: Appearance(s) in EFL Trophy)	1	20	6
Career total			288	93	11	6	10	1	22	6	332	105

== Honours ==
Barnsley

- Football League One play-offs: 2016
- Football League Trophy: 2015–16

Individual

- PFA Team of the Year: 2013–14 League Two
- Football League Two Golden Boot: 2013–14
