= Harry White (footballer, born 1994) =

English footballer

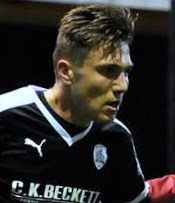
- Striker Harry White playing for Barnsley

Personal information
- Full name: Harry John White
- Date of birth: 18 December 1994 (age 31)
- Place of birth: Birmingham, England
- Position: Forward

Team information
- Current team: Stratford Town

Youth career
- Coventry City

College career
Years	Team	Apps	(Gls)
2013–2014	Lincoln Land Community College		

Senior career*
Years	Team	Apps	(Gls)
201?–2012	Earlswood Town		
2012–2013	Coventry Sphinx		
2013	Banbury United		
2014–2015	Gloucester City	33	(7)
2015–2016	Barnsley	0	(0)
2016	→ Kidderminster Harriers (loan)	7	(3)
2016	→ Boreham Wood (loan)	8	(2)
2016–2017	Solihull Moors	33	(8)
2017–2018	Chester	30	(5)
2018	Hereford	17	(4)
2018	Redditch United	3	(2)
2019–2020	Oakleigh Cannons		
2020–2021	Stratford Town		
2021–2022	Halesowen Town		
2022–2023	Racing Club Warwick	11	(0)
- * Club domestic league appearances and goals as of 20:45, 28 December 2023 (UTC)

Harry John White (born 18 December 1994) is an English footballer who plays for Southern League Premier Division Central side Stratford Town, where he plays as a forward.

== Club career ==
Harry White played youth football for Coventry City Academy, and later played in non-league for Coventry Sphinx and Banbury United. In 2013 he moved to America to study and play college soccer at Lincoln Land Community College.

=== Gloucester City ===
After a year in America, White returned to England and in his first game back at Banbury United White scored a hat-trick against Daventry, resulting in a trial at Bristol Rovers. White then signed for National League North club Gloucester City following an impressive performance while scoring against "The Tigers" for Bristol Rovers in the Gloucestershire County Cup in October 2014. He went on to play 27 games in the league, scoring a total of 7 goals.

=== Barnsley ===
He was signed by League One side Barnsley on a 2-year deal for an undisclosed fee in September 2015. He made his debut for the "Tykes" on 6 October, coming on for Kadeem Harris 65 minutes into a 2–1 victory over Bradford City in the Football League Trophy. After a very successful goalscoring spell in Barnsley's U21s White made two first team appearances and 13 on the Barnsley bench, before he was loaned out to Kidderminster Harriers.

==== Kidderminster Harriers (Loan) ====
White was signed on a 1-month loan deal, playing 7 games in the National League for the 'Harriers' where he scored 3 goals.

==== Boreham Wood (Loan) ====
White then signed for fellow National League side Boreham Wood on loan for the remainder of the 2015–2016 season, scoring 2 valuable goals which helped save Boreham Wood from relegation.

=== Solihull Moors F.C. ===
On 14 June, White was transferred from Barnsley FC to National League side Solihull Moors F.C. for an undisclosed fee. White finished the season as Moors top scorer with 12 goals from 19 starts.

=== Chester F.C. ===
On 2 May Chester F.C. negotiated his release from a two-year contract. White finished the season with 5 goals from 20 starts. Chester F.C. ended the season in 23rd position and were subsequently relegated to the National League North.

=== Hereford F.C. ===
On 18 June 2018, White signed for newly promoted National League North team Hereford. He was released by mutual consent on 12 December 2018.

=== Redditch United ===
On 13 December 2018, White signed for Southern Premier Division side Redditch United. Before joining, White signed a pre-contract to join an Australian side in January.

=== Oakleigh Cannons ===
The Australian club turned out to be Oakleigh Cannons, which he joined on 15 January 2019.

=== Stratford Town ===
White returned to English football on 24 September 2020, when he was confirmed as signing for Southern League Premier Division Central side Stratford Town.

== Career statistics ==
Appearances and goals by club, season and competition
Club	Season	League			FA Cup		League Cup		Other		Total	
Club	Season	Division	Apps	Goals	Apps	Goals	Apps	Goals	Apps	Goals	Apps	Goals
Gloucester City	2014–15	Conference North	27	7	0	0	0	0	0	0	27	7
Gloucester City	2015–16	National League North	6	0	0	0	0	0	0	0	6	0
Gloucester City	Total		33	7	0	0	0	0	0	0	33	7
Barnsley	2015–16	League One	0	0	0	0	0	0	2	0	2	0
Kidderminster Harriers (loan)	2015–16	National League	7	3	0	0	0	0	0	0	7	3
Boreham Wood (loan)	2015–16	National League	8	2	0	0	0	0	0	0	8	2
Solihull Moors	2016–17	National League	33	8	2	0	0	0	3	4	38	12
Chester	2017–18	National League	29	5	0	0	0	0	1	1	0	0
Hereford	2018–19	National League North	17	4	0	0	0	0	0	0	17	4
Redditch United	2018–19	Southern Premier Division	3	2	0	0	0	0	0	0	0	0
Career total			118	30	2	0	0	0	6	5	126	35

Notes

- Early career statistics not known.
