= George Smith (footballer, born 1996) =

English footballer

Personal information
- Full name: George Thomas Smith
- Date of birth: 14 August 1996 (age 30)
- Place of birth: Barnsley, England
- Position: Left back

Team information
- Current team: Cleethorpes Town

Youth career
- –2014: Barnsley

Senior career*
Years	Team	Apps	(Gls)
2014–2016	Barnsley	37	(0)
2014	→ Bradford Park Avenue (loan)	0	(0)
2016	→ Crawley Town (loan)	4	(0)
2016–2017	Gateshead	38	(1)
2017–2018	Northampton Town	6	(0)
2018–2019	Chesterfield	10	(0)
2018–2019	→ Dover Athletic (loan)	7	(0)
2019	→ Boston United (loan)	8	(0)
2019–2020	Harrogate Town	21	(1)
2020–2021	Gateshead	12	(0)
2021–2022	Darlington	21	(1)
2022–2023	Guiseley	24	(2)
2023	→ Liversedge (loan)	9	(0)
2023–2024	Farsley Celtic	34	(0)
2024–	Cleethorpes Town	20	(0)
- * Club domestic league appearances and goals as of 14:09, 17 March 2025 (UTC)

George Thomas Smith (born 14 August 1996) is an English footballer who plays as a left back for Northern Premier League Premier Division club Cleethorpes Town. He has previously played in the English Football League for Barnsley, Crawley Town, Northampton Town and Chesterfield, and in the National League for Bradford Park Avenue, Gateshead, Dover Athletic, Boston United, Harrogate Town and Darlington.

== Career ==
=== Barnsley ===
Smith began his career with Barnsley, progressing through the club's academy and signed a professional contract in June 2014. He made his Football League debut on 26 December 2014 in a 1–0 defeat against Preston North End.

He made four League Two appearances during a month's loan at Crawley Town early in 2016, and was not offered a new contract by Barnsley when his existing deal expired in June 2016.

=== Gateshead ===
On 29 June 2016, Smith signed for Gateshead on a one-year deal ahead of the 2016–17 National League season. He made his league debut for the club on 6 August against Chester and scored his first senior goal in a 3–0 win over Southport on 4 February 2017.

=== Northampton Town ===
In May 2017, Smith signed a two-year contract with Northampton Town. He made his debut on 9 September against Doncaster Rovers, assisting Matt Crooks with the only goal of the match after 21 seconds, the quickest goal ever scored at Sixfields Stadium.

=== Chesterfield ===
Smith left Northampton on 31 January 2018 to sign an 18-month deal with League Two club Chesterfield; the fee was undisclosed. Following two loan spells during the 2018–19 season, the first at Dover Athletic, where he made his debut in a 2–1 loss against Barnet on 1 September 2018, and the second at Boston United, Smith was released by Chesterfield when his contract expired.

=== Harrogate Town ===
On 12 June 2019, Harrogate Town announced the signing of Smith.

=== Return to Gateshead ===
On 9 June 2020, Smith rejoined Gateshead on a one-year contract. He made 12 National League North appearances before the season was curtailed because of the COVID-19 pandemic, and was released when his contract expired.

=== Darlington ===
Smith followed full-back partner Kallum Griffiths to National League North rivals Darlington for the 2021–22 season. He was one of ten players released by the club at the end of the season.

=== Guiseley ===
On 20 May 2022, Smith signed a one-year contract with Northern Premier League Premier Division club Guiseley.

In March 2023, he joined league rivals Liversedge on loan until the end of the season.

=== Farsley Celtic ===
In May 2023, he signed for National League North club Farsley Celtic.

=== Cleethorpes Town ===
Smith joined Northern Premier League First Division East club Cleethorpes Town for the 2024–25 season.

== Career statistics ==
As of match played 15 March 2025

Appearances and goals by club, season and competition
Club	Season	League			FA Cup		League Cup		Other		Total	
Club	Season	Division	Apps	Goals	Apps	Goals	Apps	Goals	Apps	Goals	Apps	Goals
Barnsley	2014–15	League One	18	0	1	0	0	0	0	0	19	0
Barnsley	2015–16	League One	19	0	1	0	2	0	3 (Note: Appearances in Football League Trophy)	0	23	0
Barnsley	Total		37	0	2	0	2	0	3	0	44	0
Crawley Town (loan)	2015–16	League Two	4	0	0	0	0	0	0	0	4	0
Gateshead	2016–17	National League	38	1	0	0	—		0	0	38	1
Northampton Town	2017–18	League One	6	0	1	0	1	0	2 (Note: Appearances in EFL Trophy)	0	10	0
Chesterfield	2017–18	League Two	8	0	0	0	0	0	0	0	8	0
Chesterfield	2018–19	National League	2	0	0	0	—		0	0	2	0
Chesterfield	Total		10	0	0	0	0	0	0	0	10	0
Dover Athletic (loan)	2018–19	National League	7	0	0	0	—		0	0	7	0
Boston United (loan)	2018–19	National League North	8	0	0	0	—		0	0	8	0
Harrogate Town	2019–20	National League	21	1	2	0	—		2 (Note: Appearance(s) in FA Trophy)	0	25	1
Gateshead	2020–21	National League North	12	0	1	0	—		0	0	13	0
Darlington	2021–22	National League North	21	1	2	0	—		0	0	23	1
Guiseley	2021–22	Northern Premier League (NPL); Premier Division	24	2	1	0	—		3	0	28	2
Farsley Celtic	2023–24	National League North	34	0	2	0	—		1	0	37	0
Cleethorpes Town	2024–25	NPL Division One East	20	0	4	0	—		3 (Note: Two appearances in FA Trophy, one in Lincolnshire Senior Cup)	0	27	0
Career total			242	5	15	0	3	0	14	0	274	5
