= Jack Cowgill =

English footballer (born 1997)

Personal information
- Full name: Jack Nicholas Cowgill
- Date of birth: 8 January 1997 (age 29)
- Place of birth: Wakefield, England
- Position: Defender

Team information
- Current team: Ossett United

Youth career
- –2014: Barnsley

Senior career*
Years	Team	Apps	(Gls)
2014–2017	Barnsley	2	(0)
2016	→ Braintree Town (loan)	4	(0)
2017	→ AFC Fylde (loan)	1	(0)
2017	Boston United	7	(0)
- * Club domestic league appearances and goals as of 14 February 2018

Jack Nicholas Cowgill (born 8 January 1997) is an English footballer who plays as a defender for Boston United.

== Club career ==
Cowgill began his career with Barnsley. He progressed through the club's academy and signed a professional contract in August 2014. He made his Football League debut on 13 December 2014 in a 3–1 defeat against Walsall.
