= Mike Phenix =

English footballer

Personal information
- Full name: Michael Phenix
- Date of birth: 15 March 1989 (age 37)
- Place of birth: Wigan, England
- Position: Forward

Team information
- Current team: Wythenshawe

Youth career
- 2006–2008: Bolton Wanderers

Senior career*
Years	Team	Apps	(Gls)
2008–2011	Hindsford		
2011–2012	Droylsden		
2012–2013	Skelmersdale United		
2013–2014	AFC Telford United	46	(24)
2014–2015	Barnsley	3	(0)
2015	→ Macclesfield Town (loan)	3	(0)
2015	→ Southport (loan)	23	(8)
2015–2016	Southport	15	(5)
2016–2018	Salford City	80	(34)
2018	Southport	7	(0)
2022	Ashton United	8	(2)
2022	→ Prestwich Heys (dual-registration)		
2022–2023	Prestwich Heys		
2024	Avro	6	(0)
2024–	Wythenshawe	15	(9)
- * Club domestic league appearances and goals as of 10:35, 11 October 2024 (UTC)

Michael Phenix (born 15 March 1989) is an English footballer who plays as a forward for Northern Premier League Division One West club Wythenshawe.

== Career ==
=== Early career ===
Phenix was born in Wigan and began his career at Bolton Wanderers academy. He failed to earn a professional contract at Bolton and began playing amateur football with Manchester League side Hindsford. After a trial at Notts County, Phenix played for Droylsden and Skelmersdale United before joining AFC Telford United. He missed a month of the 2013–14 season after suffering from ulcerative colitis.

=== Barnsley ===
In October 2014 Phenix joined League One side Barnsley for a fee of £25,000. He made his Football League debut on 17 January 2015 in a 1–0 defeat against Doncaster Rovers. After struggling for game time at Oakwell Phenix went out on loan to Macclesfield Town in March 2015.

=== Southport ===
Despite playing several times for Barnsley in pre-season in 2015, he again went out on loan to Southport on 11 August 2015. He made his debut for Southport the same day, playing the full 90 minutes in their 0–0 draw with Macclesfield. His first goal for the club came in a 2–2 home draw against Tranmere Rovers on 15 September 2015. In October 2015 Phenix had his role terminated by the club however he signed for the club after he agreed a deal for the remainder of the 2015–16 season. He was released at the end of the season, scoring five goals and making 36 appearances for the club.

=== Salford City ===
He joined Salford City in late May 2016.

Mike made his Salford debut on the opening day of the 2016-2017 when Gloucester visited Moor Lane, The Ammies' first ever National League North fixture would finish 0-0 but 'Pheno' was soon on the goal trail. He scored in each of the next five matches, including a winner against local rivals FC United of Manchester. Sixteen goals were recorded over a campaign that ended in play-off disappointment but he had the consolation of finishing as the club's top scorer. He made a vital contribution during the 2017-2018 title winning season too, notching eleven times.

=== Southport (second spell) ===
In June 2018 he re-joined Southport. In October 2018, having made seven league appearances on his return to Southport, his contract was terminated with immediate effect. Phenix thereafter announced his retirement from football. In May 2019 it was announced he had been banned from all football and football-related activity for four years for regularly using cocaine.

=== Return to football ===
In September 2022, Phenix made his return to football, joining Ashton United. In November 2022, following a short spell on dual-registration terms, he joined North West Counties Football League Premier Division club Prestwich Heys.

In July 2024, following a year out of football, Phenix joined Avro. On 24 September 2024, he joined Wythenshawe.
