= 2022–23 Barnsley F.C. season =

Barnsley
2022–23 season
- Owner: Chien Lee; Pacific Media Group
- Head Coach: Michael Duff
- Stadium: Oakwell
- League One: 4th
- FA Cup: Third round
- EFL Cup: Second round
- EFL Trophy: Second round
Home colours

The 2022–23 season is the 136th season in the existence of Barnsley Football Club and the club's first season back in League One following their relegation from the Championship the previous season. In addition to the league, they also competed in the FA Cup, the EFL Cup and the EFL Trophy.

== Transfers ==
=== In ===
| Date | Pos | Player | Transferred from | Fee | Ref |
|---|---|---|---|---|---|
| 1 July 2022 (Note: The transfer was announced on 17 June, and would become official on 1 July, once his Celtic contract expired) | DM | (Republic of Ireland) Luca Connell | (Scotland) Celtic | Free Transfer | |
| 1 July 2022 (Note: The transfer was announced on 22 June, and would become official on 1 July, once his Bristol City contract expired) | CB | (England) Robbie Cundy | (England) Bristol City | Free Transfer | |
| 1 July 2022 (Note: The transfer was announced on 25 June, and would become official on 1 July, once his St Mirren contract expired) | CB | (Republic of Ireland) Conor McCarthy | (Scotland) St Mirren | Free Transfer | |
| 1 July 2022 (Note: The transfer was announced on 16 June, and would become official on 1 July, once his Swansea City contract expired) | GK | (New Zealand) Jamie Searle | (Wales) Swansea City | Free Transfer | |
| 11 July 2022 | LM | (Scotland) Nicky Cadden | (England) Forest Green Rovers | Free Transfer | |
| 16 July 2022 | CF | (England) James Norwood | (England) Ipswich Town | Free Transfer | |
| 20 July 2022 | CF | (England) Jack Butterfill | (England) Leicester City | Free Transfer | |
| 1 September 2022 | CM | (England) Adam Phillips | (England) Burnley | Undisclosed | |
| 18 January 2023 | RB | (Republic of Ireland) Barry Cotter | (Republic of Ireland) Shamrock Rovers | Undisclosed | |
| 31 January 2023 | GK | (England) Adam Hayton | (England) Tottenham Hotspur | Undisclosed | |
| 31 January 2023 | CF | (Scotland) Oli Shaw | (Scotland) Kilmarnock | Undisclosed | |
| 1 February 2023 | CB | (England) Rudi Pache | Free agent | —N/a | |
| 1 February 2023 | CM | (Jamaica) Jon Russell | (England) Huddersfield Town | Undisclosed | |

=== Out ===
| Date | Pos | Player | Transferred to | Fee | Ref |
|---|---|---|---|---|---|
| 10 June 2022 (Note: The transfer was announced on 8 June and would become official on 10 June, once the transfer window opened) | AM | (Wales) Isaac Christie-Davies | (Belgium) Eupen | Undisclosed | |
| 17 June 2022 | CF | (Austria) Patrick Schmidt | (Austria) Admira Wacker Mödling | Undisclosed | |
| 21 June 2022 | CF | (England) Cauley Woodrow | (England) Luton Town | Undisclosed | |
| 30 June 2022 | GK | (England) Archie Brown | Unattached | Released | |
| 30 June 2022 | CB | (Finland) Aapo Halme | (Finland) HJK Helsinki | Released | |
| 30 June 2022 | MF | (England) Blake Goucher | Unattached | Released | |
| 30 June 2022 | RB | (England) Ben Hall | Unattached | Released | |
| 30 June 2022 | DM | (England) Connor Hodgson | (England) Ossett United | Released | |
| 30 June 2022 | GK | (Nigeria) Daniel Jinadu | Unattached | Released | |
| 30 June 2022 | CF | (England) George Miller | (England) Doncaster Rovers | Released | |
| 30 June 2022 | CM | (England) Romal Palmer | (Turkey) Göztepe | Free Transfer | |
| 30 June 2022 | FW | (England) Jake Sherlock | Unattached | Released | |
| 30 June 2022 | FW | (England) Lloyd Smith | (England) Bradford (Park Avenue) | Released | |
| 6 July 2022 | CF | (England) Carlton Morris | (England) Luton Town | Undisclosed | |
| 15 July 2022 | CF | (Nigeria) Victor Adeboyejo | (England) Burton Albion | Free Transfer | |
| 21 July 2022 | RB | (England) Callum Brittain | (England) Blackburn Rovers | Undisclosed | |
| 19 August 2022 | CF | (England) David Bremang | (England) Crawley Town | Undisclosed | |
| 1 September 2022 | CB | (Poland) Michał Helik | (England) Huddersfield Town | Undisclosed | |
| 29 October 2022 | CF | (England) Cameron Thompson | (England) Torquay United | Free Transfer | |
| 17 January 2023 | AM | (Lithuania) Tomas Kalinauskas | (Netherlands) FC Den Bosch | Free Transfer | |
| 26 January 2023 | CM | (Republic of Ireland) William Hondermarck | (England) Northampton Town | Undisclosed | |
| 30 January 2023 | CB | (Israel) Amir Ariely | (Israel) Hapoel Be'er Sheva | Undisclosed | |
| 30 January 2023 | GK | (England) Jack Walton | (England) Luton Town | Undisclosed | |
| 31 January 2023 | CF | (Scotland) Jack Aitchison | (Scotland) Motherwell | Free Transfer | |

=== Loans in ===
| Date | Pos | Player | Loaned from | On loan until | Ref |
|---|---|---|---|---|---|
| 4 August 2022 | CF | (Serbia) Slobodan Tedić | (England) Manchester City | End of Season | |
| 31 August 2022 | LW | (England) Josh Martin | (England) Norwich City | End of Season | |
| 1 September 2022 | RB | (England) Tom Edwards | (England) Stoke City | 16 January 2023 (Note: On 16 January, Edwards' loan from Stoke ended early) | |
| 12 September 2022 | LB | (France) Ziyad Larkeche | (England) Fulham | End of Season | |
| 5 January 2023 | CF | (England) Max Watters | (Wales) Cardiff City | End of Season | |
| 14 January 2023 | CB | (England) Bobby Thomas | (England) Burnley | End of Season | |
| 30 January 2023 | GK | (England) Harry Isted | (England) Luton Town | End of Season | |

=== Loans out ===
| Date | Pos | Player | Loaned to | On loan until | Ref |
|---|---|---|---|---|---|
| 1 September 2022 | LB | (Kenya) Clarke Oduor | (England) Hartlepool United | End of Season | |
| 2 September 2022 | CM | (Hungary) Callum Styles | (England) Millwall | End of Season | |
| 6 September 2022 | AM | (Lithuania) Tomas Kalinauskas | (England) Havant & Waterlooville | 1 January 2023 | |
| 8 September 2022 | CF | (Belgium) Aaron Leya Iseka | (Turkey) Adanaspor | End of Season | |
| 12 September 2022 | CF | (England) Aiden Marsh | (England) Scunthorpe United | End of Season | |
| 27 September 2022 | CM | (England) Joe Ackroyd | (England) Guiseley | 16 December 2022 (Note: On 28 October, Ackroyd's loan at Guiseley was extended.) (Note: On 16 December, Ackroyd was recalled back.) | |
| 4 November 2022 | MF | (England) Keegan Hartley | (England) Guiseley | 2 January 2023 (Note: On 3 December, Hartley's loan at Guiseley was extended.) | |
| 4 November 2022 | CM | (England) Will Lancaster | (England) Bradford (Park Avenue) | 1 January 2023 (Note: On 2 December, Lancaster's loan at Bradford PA was extended.) | |
| 7 January 2023 | FW | (England) Josiah Dyer | (England) FC United of Manchester | 7 February 2023 | |
| 10 January 2023 | CM | (England) Joe Ackroyd | (England) Buxton | 10 February 2023 | |
| 11 January 2023 | CM | (England) Will Lancaster | (England) Bradford (Park Avenue) | End of Season | |
| 18 January 2023 | CB | (England) Jasper Moon | (England) Burton Albion | End of Season | |
| 27 January 2023 | RB | (England) Kareem Hassan-Smith | (England) Guiseley | 24 February 2023 | |
| 10 February 2023 | LB | (England) Charlie Winfield | (England) Alfreton Town | 10 March 2023 | |
| 28 February 2023 | CB | (England) Daniel Benson | (England) Bradford (Park Avenue) | 28 March 2023 | |
| 28 February 2023 | GK | (England) Paul Cooper | (England) Ossett United | End of Season | |
| 23 March 2023 | MF | (England) Harrison Nejman | (England) Guiseley | End of Season | |

== Pre-season and friendlies ==
Crewe Alexandra and Worksop Town announced friendlies with Barnsley on 18 May 2022. Belper Town did likewise on 24 May. On 1 June Barnsley confirmed their pre-season schedule. A trip to Harrogate Town was later added to the schedule.

Win Draw Loss Fixtures

| 25 June 2022 Friendly | Worksop Town | 1–3 | Barnsley | Worksop |
| 15:00 BST | Hardy 50' (pen.) | Report | Cole 8'; Leya Iseka 26'; Brittain 38' | Stadium: Windsor Foodservice Stadium |

| 1 July 2022 Friendly | Walsall | 0–1 | Barnsley | Essington |
| 13:00 BST | | Report | Cole 45' | Stadium: Walsall Training Ground; Attendance: 0 (behind-closed doors) |

| 9 July 2022 Friendly | Barnsley | 0–0 | Crewe Alexandra | Barnsley |
| 15:00 BST | | Report | | Stadium: Barnsley F.C. Training Ground; Attendance: 200 (approx) |

| 12 July 2022 Friendly | Guiseley | 1–2 | Barnsley XI | Guiseley |
| 19:00 BST | Trialist (?) | Report | o.g. 63'; Jalo 78' | Stadium: Nethermoor Park |

| 16 July 2022 Friendly | Barnsley | 0–0 | Nottingham Forest | Barnsley |
| 17:30 BST | | Report | | Stadium: Oakwell |

| 20 July 2022 Friendly | Harrogate Town | 2–2 | Barnsley | Harrogate |
| 19:00 BST | Wright 11'; Pattison 72' | Report | Marsh 45'; Moon 58' | Stadium: EnviroVent Stadium |

| 23 July 2022 Friendly | Barnsley | 2–1 | Sheffield United | Barnsley |
| 15:00 BST | Aitchison 57'; Benson 82' | Report | Cundy 45+1' (o.g.) | Stadium: Oakwell |

| 2 August 2022 Friendly | Belper Town | 1–2 | Barnsley | Belper |
| 19:00 | | | | Stadium: Christchurch Meadow |

== Competitions ==
=== Overall record ===
| Competition | First match | Last match | Starting round | Final position | Record | | | | | | | |
| Competition | First match | Last match | Starting round | Final position | Pld | W | D | L | GF | GA | GD | Win % |
|---|---|---|---|---|---|---|---|---|---|---|---|---|
| League One | 30 July 2022 | May 2023 | Matchday 1 | | 10 | 5 | 2 | 3 | 16 | 10 | +6 | 50.00 |
| FA Cup | TBC | TBC | First round | | 0 | 0 | 0 | 0 | 0 | 0 | +0 | — |
| EFL Cup | 10 August 2022 | 24 August 2022 | First round | Second round | 2 | 1 | 0 | 1 | 2 | 3 | −1 | 50.00 |
| EFL Trophy | 30 August 2022 | TBC | Group stage | | 2 | 1 | 0 | 1 | 2 | 3 | −1 | 50.00 |
| Total | | | | | 14 | 7 | 2 | 5 | 20 | 16 | +4 | 50.00 |

Last updated: 24 September 2022
Source: [ Soccerway]

=== League One ===
==== League table ====
| Pos | Team | Pld | W | D | L | GF | GA | GD | Pts | Promotion, qualification or relegation |
|---|---|---|---|---|---|---|---|---|---|---|
| 1 | Plymouth Argyle (C, P) | 46 | 31 | 8 | 7 | 82 | 47 | +35 | 101 | Promotion to EFL Championship |
| 2 | Ipswich Town (P) | 46 | 28 | 14 | 4 | 101 | 35 | +66 | 98 | Promotion to EFL Championship |
| 3 | Sheffield Wednesday (O, P) | 46 | 28 | 12 | 6 | 81 | 37 | +44 | 96 | Qualification for League One play-offs |
| 4 | Barnsley | 46 | 26 | 8 | 12 | 80 | 47 | +33 | 86 | Qualification for League One play-offs |
| 5 | Bolton Wanderers | 46 | 23 | 12 | 11 | 62 | 36 | +26 | 81 | Qualification for League One play-offs |
| 6 | Peterborough United | 46 | 24 | 5 | 17 | 75 | 54 | +21 | 77 | Qualification for League One play-offs |
| 7 | Derby County | 46 | 21 | 13 | 12 | 67 | 46 | +21 | 76 | |

Source: EFL Official Website
Rules for classification: 1) Points; 2) Goal difference; 3) Number of goals scored; 4) Head-to-head results; 5) Wins; 6) Away goals; 7) Penalty points (sec 9.5); 8) 12-point sending off offences
(C) Champions; (O) Play-off winners; (P) Promoted

==== Results summary ====
| Overall | | | | | | | | Home | | | | | | Away | | | | | |
| Pld | W | D | L | GF | GA | GD | Pts | W | D | L | GF | GA | GD | W | D | L | GF | GA | GD |
|---|---|---|---|---|---|---|---|---|---|---|---|---|---|---|---|---|---|---|---|
| 45 | 26 | 8 | 11 | 80 | 45 | +35 | 86 | 16 | 1 | 5 | 45 | 22 | +23 | 10 | 7 | 6 | 35 | 23 | +12 |

Last updated: 29 April 2023.
Source: [ Soccerway]

==== Results by round ====
| Round | 1 | 2 | 3 | 4 | 5 | 6 | 7 | 8 | 9 | 10 | 11 | 12 | 13 | 14 | 15 | 16 | 17 | 18 | 19 | 20 | 21 | 22 | 23 | 24 | 25 | 26 | 27 | 28 | 29 | 30 | 31 | 32 | 33 | 34 | 35 | 36 | 37 | 38 | 39 | 40 | 41 | 42 | 43 | 44 | 45 | 46 |
|---|---|---|---|---|---|---|---|---|---|---|---|---|---|---|---|---|---|---|---|---|---|---|---|---|---|---|---|---|---|---|---|---|---|---|---|---|---|---|---|---|---|---|---|---|---|---|
| Ground | A | H | A | H | H | A | A | H | A | H | A | H | A | A | H | H | A | H | A | H | A | H | H | A | H | A | A | H | A | A | H | A | H | H | A | H | A | H | A | H | A | A | H | H | A | H |
| Result | L | W | L | W | L | D | W | D | W | W | W | L | D | L | L | W | W | W | W | W | D | W | L | L | W | W | D | W | W | W | W | D | W | W | W | W | L | W | L | W | W | D | W | L | D | L |
| Position | 21 | 13 | 19 | 9 | 16 | 16 | 10 | 11 | 6 | 5 | 5 | 5 | 6 | 9 | 9 | 8 | 8 | 6 | 4 | 4 | 4 | 4 | 6 | 6 | 6 | 6 | 6 | 6 | 6 | 6 | 5 | 6 | 4 | 4 | 4 | 4 | 4 | 4 | 4 | 4 | 4 | 4 | 4 | 4 | 4 | 4 |

Updated to match(es) played on 7 May 2023. Source: [ Soccerway]
A = Away; H = Home; W = Win; D = Draw; L = Loss; P = Postponed

==== Matches ====
Win Draw Loss Fixtures

On 23 June, the league fixtures were announced.

| 30 July 2022 1 | Plymouth Argyle | 1–0 | Barnsley | Plymouth |
| 15:00 BST | Azaz 45' | Report | Cadden (yellow card) 10'; Styles (yellow card) 44' | Stadium: Home Park; Attendance: 14,624; Referee: Charles Breakspear |

| 6 August 2022 2 | Barnsley | 1–0 | Cheltenham Town | Barnsley |
| 15:00 BST | Thomas 66' | Report | Long (yellow card) 9'; Sercombe (yellow card) 16'; Bonds (yellow card) 44'; Adshead (yellow card) 69' | Stadium: Oakwell Stadium; Attendance: 10,289; Referee: Carl Brook |

| 13 August 2022 3 | Derby County | 2–1 | Barnsley | Derby |
| 15:00 BST | McCarthy 8' (o.g.); Mendez-Laing 35'; Cashin (yellow card) 47' | Report | McCarthy (yellow card) 62'; Benson 64' | Stadium: Pride Park Stadium; Attendance: 26,123; Referee: Peter Wright |

| 16 August 2022 4 | Barnsley | 3–0 | Bristol Rovers | Barnsley |
| 19:45 BST | Cole 3'; Williams 13'; Benson 56' | Report | Finley (yellow card) 35'; Coutts (yellow card) 35'; Connolly (yellow card) 58' | Stadium: Oakwell Stadium; Attendance: 9,689; Referee: Darren Drysdale |

| 20 August 2022 5 | Barnsley | 0–3 | Wycombe Wanderers | Barnsley |
| 15:00 BST | Williams (yellow card) 46'; Benson (yellow card) 87'; Norwood (yellow card) 90+1' | Report | Mehmeti 37'; Obita (yellow card) 41'; Mawson (yellow card) 68'; Gape 72'; Freeman 83' | Stadium: Oakwell Stadium; Attendance: 9,978; Referee: Ollie Yates |

| 27 August 2022 6 | Ipswich Town | 2–2 | Barnsley | Ipswich |
| 15:00 BST | Chaplin 27', (yellow card) 71'; Edmundson (yellow card) 68'; Morsy 70' | Report | Aitchison 33'; Styles (yellow card) 59', (goal) 75'; Wolfe (yellow card) 81'; Norwood (yellow card) 87'; Andersen (yellow card) 90' | Stadium: Portman Road; Attendance: 25,001; Referee: Steve Martin |

| 3 September 2022 7 | Sheffield Wednesday | 0–2 | Barnsley | Owlerton, Sheffield |
| 15:00 BST | Ihiekwe (yellow card) 79'; Smith (yellow card) 81' | Report | Connell (yellow card) 18'; Cole 34'; Thomas (yellow card) 69'; Norwood 74', (yellow card) 82'; Wolfe (yellow card) 80' | Stadium: Hillsborough; Attendance: 27,939; Referee: Josh Smith |

| 13 September 2022 8 | Barnsley | 1–1 | Port Vale | Barnsley |
| 19:45 BST | Kitching 43', (yellow card) 82'; Cole (yellow card) 52'; Connell (yellow card) 86' | Report | Harrison 83' | Stadium: Oakwell Stadium; Attendance: 9,552; Referee: Thomas Parsons |

| 17 September 2022 9 | Cambridge United | 0–3 | Barnsley | Cambridge |
| 15:00 BST | Dunk (yellow card) 29'; Smith (yellow card) 89' | Report | Kitching (yellow card) 14' (yellow-red card) 68'; Cole 24', (yellow card) 44'; Thomas (yellow card) 70'; Cundy 76'; Norwood 90+1' | Stadium: The Abbey Stadium; Attendance: 6,138; Referee: Declan Bourne |

| 24 September 2022 10 | Barnsley | 3–1 | Charlton Athletic | Barnsley |
| 15:00 BST | Benson 10'; Norwood 54'; Cole 76' | Report | Payne 85' | Stadium: Oakwell Stadium; Attendance: 10,234; Referee: Adam Herczeg |

| 1 October 2022 11 | Fleetwood Town | 0–1 | Barnsley | Fleetwood |
| 15:00 BST | Devlin (yellow card) 24'; Macadam (yellow card) 45'; Warrington (yellow card) 68'; Garner (yellow card) 90+1' | Report | Kane (yellow card) 43'; Aitchison 90' | Stadium: Highbury Stadium; Attendance: 4,024; Referee: Sam Barrott |

| 8 October 2022 12 | Barnsley | 0–2 | Exeter City | Barnsley |
| 15:00 BST | | Report | Stansfield 1' 48'; Brown (yellow card) 89' | Stadium: Oakwell Stadium; Attendance: 10,384; Referee: Martin Coy |

| 15 October 2022 13 | Bolton Wanderers | 0–0 | Barnsley | Bolton |
| 15:00 BST | Thomason (yellow card) 57'; Dempsey (yellow card) 70'; Bradley (yellow card) 87' | Report | Norwood (yellow card) 24'; Larkeche (yellow card) 27' | Stadium: University of Bolton Stadium; Attendance: 18,415; Referee: David Rock |

| 22 October 2022 14 | Morecambe | 1–0 | Barnsley | Morecambe |
| 15:00 BST | Phillips 39'; Cooney (yellow card) 66'; Connolly (yellow card) 87'; Shaw (yellow card) 90+1' | Report | Cundy (yellow card) 55'; Edwards (yellow card) 90' | Stadium: Mazuma Stadium; Attendance: 5,270; Referee: Simon Mather |

| 25 October 2022 15 | Barnsley | 0–1 | Lincoln City | Barnsley |
| 19:45 BST | Kane (yellow card) 26'; Benson (yellow card) 65' | Report | Mandroiu 45+4'; Sanders (yellow card) 66' | Stadium: Oakwell Stadium; Attendance: 10,397; Referee: James Oldham |

| 29 October 2022 16 | Barnsley | 2–0 | Forest Green Rovers | Barnsley |
| 15:00 BST | Cole 15'; Kitching (yellow card) 33'; Martin 83' | Report | | Stadium: Oakwell Stadium; Attendance: 9,551; Referee: Bobby Madden |

| 12 November 2022 17 | Shrewsbury Town | 0–1 | Barnsley | Shrewsbury |
| 15:00 GMT | Pyke (yellow card) 27'; Flanagan (yellow card) 67'; Shipley (yellow card) 70'; Dunkley (yellow card) 90+6'; Leahy (yellow card) 90+6' | Report | Phillips 10'; Tedić (yellow card) 67'; Collins (yellow card) 90+7' | Stadium: Montgomery Waters Meadow; Attendance: 6,285; Referee: Christopher Pollard |

| 19 November 2022 18 | Barnsley | 3–1 | Milton Keynes Dons | Barnsley |
| 15:00 GMT | Williams 18'; Connell (yellow card) 26'; Andersen (yellow card) 45+2'; Phillips 50'; Kitching (yellow card) 52'; Kane 68' | Report | McEachran (yellow card) 23'; Eisa 40', (yellow card) 45+3'; Lawrence (yellow card) 84'; Jules (yellow card) 90+2' | Stadium: Oakwell Stadium; Attendance: 9,994; Referee: Andy Haines |

| 2 December 2022 19 | Peterborough United | 1–2 | Barnsley | Peterborough |
| 19:45 GMT | Taylor 21' | Report | Connell 11'; Phillips (yellow card) 38', (goal) 61'; Kane (yellow card) 84' | Stadium: Weston Homes Stadium; Attendance: 7,046; Referee: Sam Allison |

| 17 December 2022 20 | Barnsley | 2–0 | Burton Albion | Barnsley |
| 15:00 GMT | Cole 36', 73'; Connell (yellow card) 48' | Report | Taylor (yellow card) 90+1' | Stadium: Oakwell; Attendance: 9,423; Referee: Alan Young |

| 26 December 2022 21 | Accrington Stanley | 1–1 | Barnsley | Accrington |
| 15:00 GMT | Conneely (yellow card) 37'; Leigh 62' (pen.); Perritt (yellow card) 90+4' | Report | Norwood 8'; Connell (yellow card) 31'; Kane (yellow card) 80'; Cundy (yellow card) 81' | Stadium: Wham Stadium; Attendance: 4,791; Referee: Rebecca Welch |

| 29 December 2022 22 | Barnsley | 2–1 | Fleetwood Town | Barnsley |
| 19:45 GMT | Williams (yellow card) 51'; Norwood 64', (yellow card) 86'; Andersen (yellow card) 73'; Kane (yellow card) 84'; Cundy 86'; Jaló (yellow card) 90+2' | Report | Garner (yellow card) 45'; Muskwe 77' (pen.) | Stadium: Oakwell; Attendance: 10,219; Referee: Ben Speedie |

| 2 January 2023 23 | Barnsley | 0–3 | Bolton Wanderers | Barnsley |
| 15:00 GMT | Andersen (red card) 11' | Report | Charles 12' (pen.); Böðvarsson 41'; Dempsey 76'; Johnston (yellow card) 82'; Toal (yellow card) 90+3' | Stadium: Oakwell Stadium; Attendance: 13,913; Referee: Seb Stockbridge |

| 14 January 2023 24 | Charlton Athletic | 2–0 | Barnsley | Charlton |
| 15:00 GMT | Campbell 19'; Rak-Sakyi 61'; Inniss (yellow card) 82'; Clare (yellow card) 84'; Bonne (yellow card) 90' | Report | Kitching (yellow card) 43'; Kane (yellow card) 57'; Andersen (yellow card) 66'; Norwood (yellow card) 82'; Phillips (yellow card) 90+2' | Stadium: The Valley; Attendance: 13,266; Referee: Craig Hicks |

| 21 January 2023 25 | Barnsley | 3–1 | Accrington Stanley | Barnsley |
| 15:00 GMT | Norwood 5'; Aitchison 8'; Williams 19'; Thomas (yellow card) 23' | Report | Hamilton (yellow card) 26'; Coyle (yellow card) 73'; Leigh 90+4' (pen.) | Stadium: Oakwell Stadium; Attendance: 9,893; Referee: Carl Brook |

| 1 February 2023 26 | Oxford United | 1–2 | Barnsley | Littlemore |
| 15:00 GMT | Moore 71' | Report | Thomas 30'; Cadden 58'; Kane (yellow card) 69'; Connell (yellow card) 75'; Collins (yellow card) 81'; Martin (yellow card) 90+1' | Stadium: The Kassam Stadium; Attendance: 7,381; Referee: Lee Swabey |

| 4 February 2023 27 | Portsmouth | 1–1 | Barnsley | Milton |
| 15:00 GMT | Bishop 49' | Report | Cadden (yellow card) 86'; Thomas 89' | Stadium: Fratton Park; Attendance: 17,854; Referee: Andy Woolmer |

| 11 February 2023 28 | Barnsley | 2–0 | Cambridge United | Barnsley |
| 15:00 GMT | Watters 8', (red card) 37'; Norwood (yellow card) 46'; Williams 64' | Report | Digby (yellow card) 47'; Williams (yellow card) 53'; McGrandles (yellow card) 61'; Bennett (yellow card) 90+6' | Stadium: Oakwell Stadium; Attendance: 10,840; Referee: Ross Joyce |

| 14 February 2023 29 | Port Vale | 1–3 | Barnsley | Burslem |
| 19:45 GMT | Smith 14' | Report | Connell 1'; Kitching 21'; Phillips 61', (yellow card) 76'; Cadden (yellow card) 86' | Stadium: Vale Park; Attendance: 5,663; Referee: Sam Barrott |

| 18 February 2023 30 | Cheltenham Town | 0–4 | Barnsley | Cheltenham |
| 15:00 GMT | | Report | Norwood 8'; Kane 15'; Phillips 36'; Williams 74' | Stadium: The Completely Suzuki Stadium; Attendance: 4,626; Referee: Declan Bourne |

| 25 February 2023 31 | Barnsley | 4–1 | Derby County | Barnsley |
| 15:00 GMT | Cole 21', 45+2'; Phillips 33'; B. Thomas (yellow card) 67'; Kitching (yellow card) 71'; Kane (yellow card) 75'; L. Thomas 90+4' | Report | McGoldrick 35' | Stadium: Oakwell Stadium; Attendance: 17,145; Referee: Bobby Madden |

| 5 March 2023 32 | Bristol Rovers | 0–0 | Barnsley | Horfield |
| 15:00 GMT | Finley (yellow card) 10'; Marquis (yellow card) 12'; Gordon (yellow card) 89' | Report | Russell (yellow card) 38'; Andersen (yellow card) 40' | Stadium: Memorial Stadium; Attendance: 8,816; Referee: Thomas Parsons |

| 7 March 2023 33 | Barnsley | 3–1 | Portsmouth | Barnsley |
| 19:45 GMT | Norwood 17'; Cadden 20'; Kitching (yellow card) 37'; Cole 60' | Report | Bishop 49' | Stadium: Oakwell Stadium; Attendance: 10,968; Referee: Marc Edwards |

| 11 March 2023 34 | Barnsley | 3–0 | Plymouth Argyle | Barnsley |
| 15:00 GMT | Connell (yellow card) 52'; Phillips 60'; Andersen 77'; Cadden 90+1' | Report | Matete (yellow card) 43'; Wright (yellow card) 90+4' | Stadium: Oakwell Stadium; Attendance: 12,443; Referee: Will Finnie |

| 18 March 2023 35 | Wycombe Wanderers | 0–1 | Barnsley | High Wycombe |
| 15:00 GMT | Grimmer (yellow card) 45' | Report | Kitching (yellow card) 19'; Thomas (yellow card) 42'; Watters (yellow card) 45+5'; Tedić 85'; Andersen (yellow card) 90' | Stadium: Adams Park; Attendance: 5,185; Referee: Charles Breakspear |

| 21 March 2023 36 | Barnsley | 4–2 | Sheffield Wednesday | Barnsley |
| 20:00 GMT | Cole 10'; Norwood 12'; Phillips (yellow card) 48'; Williams (yellow card) 57'; Andersen (yellow card) 81'; Watters 83'; Kitching 90+6' | Report | Gregory 33', 74', (yellow card) 89'; Smith (yellow card) 35' | Stadium: Oakwell Stadium; Attendance: 18,377; Referee: Ross Joyce |

| 28 March 2023 37 | Exeter City | 3–1 | Barnsley | Exeter |
| 19:45 BST | Stansfield 26'; Kite 49', (yellow card) 90+3'; Nombe 89' (pen.); Blackman (yellow card) 90+2'; Sweeney (yellow card) 90+5' | Report | Thomas 37', (yellow card) 89'; Connell (yellow card) 56' | Stadium: St James Park; Attendance: 6,720; Referee: Darren Handley |

| 1 April 2023 38 | Barnsley | 5–0 | Morecambe | Barnsley |
| 15:00 BST | Cole 4', 43'; Simeu 21' (o.g.); Kane 32'; Kitching (yellow card) 39'; Thomas 90+3' | Report | | Stadium: Oakwell Stadium; Attendance: 11,519; Referee: Seb Stockbridge |

| 7 April 2023 39 | Burton Albion | 2–1 | Barnsley | Burton upon Trent |
| 15:00 BST | Kirk (yellow card) 15'; Powell (yellow card) 48'; Shaughnessy 50', (yellow card) 89'; Ashworth (yellow card) 65'; Brayford (yellow card) 69'; MacGillivray (yellow card) 81'; Taylor 87' | Report | Watters (yellow card) 81'; Cadden 89'; Andersen (yellow card) 90' | Stadium: Pirelli Stadium; Attendance: 4,333; Referee: Adam Herczeg |

| 10 April 2023 40 | Barnsley | 2–1 | Shrewsbury Town | Barnsley |
| 15:00 BST | Andersen (yellow card) 29'; Cadden 40', (red card) 74'; Cole 45+2'; Connell (yellow card) 47' | Report | Bowman (yellow card) 31' (yellow-red card) 90+9'; Pennington (yellow card) 77'; Moore (yellow card) 79'; Phillips 90+1', (yellow card) 90+8'; Shipley (yellow card) 90+7'; Bloxham (yellow card) 90+8' | Stadium: Oakwell Stadium; Attendance: 13,026; Referee: Geoff Eltringham |

| 15 April 2023 41 | Forest Green Rovers | 1–5 | Barnsley | Nailsworth |
| 15:00 BST | Brown 74' | Report | Tedić 8'; Phillips 29', (penalty missed) 52', 53'; Norwood 37', (yellow card) 50'; Cole 90' | Stadium: The Bolt New Lawn; Attendance: 3,335; Referee: Craig Hicks |

| 18 April 2023 42 | Lincoln City | 0–0 | Barnsley | Lincoln |
| 19:45 BST | | Report | Kane (yellow card) 19'; Thomas (yellow card) 63'; Andersen (yellow card) 90+1' | Stadium: LNER Stadium; Attendance: 8,715; Referee: Simon Mather |

| 22 April 2023 43 | Barnsley | 2–0 | Oxford United | Barnsley |
| 15:00 BST | Connell (yellow card) 37'; Tedić 45+1', 51' | Report | Smyth (yellow card) 37'; Goodrham (yellow card) 50'; Brannagan (yellow card) 89'; Murphy (yellow card) 90+2' | Stadium: Oakwell Stadium; Attendance: 12,291; Referee: Ross Joyce |

| 25 April 2023 44 | Barnsley | 0–3 | Ipswich Town | Barnsley |
| 19:45 BST | Russell (yellow card) 25'; Cole (yellow card) 64'; Benson (yellow card) 90+1' | Report | Hirst (yellow card) 9', (goal) 45+2'; Broadhead 44', (penalty missed) 55'; Morsy (yellow card) 80'; Chaplin 81'; Walton (yellow card) 83' | Stadium: Oakwell Stadium; Attendance: 17,018; Referee: Ben Toner |

| 29 April 2023 45 | Milton Keynes Dons | 4–4 | Barnsley | Denbigh |
| 15:00 BST | McEachran (yellow card) 19'; Eisa 48' (pen.), 61'; Leko 52'; O'Hora 69'; Johnson (yellow card) 90+2' | Report | Kitching (yellow card) 23'; Kane 30'; Benson (yellow card) 50'; Norwood 73'; Watters 75', 86' | Stadium: Stadium MK; Attendance: 9,579; Referee: Anthony Backhouse |

| 7 May 2023 46 | Barnsley | 0–2 | Peterborough United | Barnsley |
| 12:00 BST | | Report | Clarke-Harris 6'; Poku (yellow card) 51'; Taylor 76' | Stadium: Oakwell; Attendance: 14,419; Referee: Scott Oldham |

==== League One play-offs ====
| 13 May 2023 Semi-Final, First leg | Bolton Wanderers | 1–1 | Barnsley | Bolton |
| 15:00 BST | Charles 67' | Report | Cadden 63' | Stadium: University of Bolton Stadium; Attendance: 23,450; Referee: Andrew Kitchen |

| 19 May 2023 Semi-Final, Second leg | Barnsley | 1–0 (2–1 agg.) | Bolton Wanderers | Barnsley |
| 20:00 GMT | Kitching 24'; Cole (yellow card) 57' | Report | Dempsey (yellow card) 42'; Santos (yellow card) 81' | Stadium: Oakwell; Attendance: 16,274; Referee: Michael Salisbury |

| 29 May 2023 Final | Sheffield Wednesday | 1–0 | Barnsley | Wembley, London |
| 15:00 BST | Windass 120+3' | Report | Phillips (red card) 49'; Thomas (yellow card) 95' | Stadium: Wembley Stadium; Attendance: 72,492; Referee: Tim Robinson |
Note: Live on Sky Sports

=== FA Cup ===
The Reds were drawn away to Bolton Wanderers in the first round, at home to Crewe Alexandra in the second round and away to Derby County in the third round.

Win Draw Loss Fixtures

| 5 November 2022 First round | Bolton Wanderers | 1–2 | Barnsley | Bolton |
| 14:00 GMT | Thomason (yellow card) 61'; Böðvarsson 80' | Report | Santos 6' (o.g.); Phillips 33' (yellow card) 76'; Kane (yellow card) 37'; Kitching (yellow card) 50'; Walton (yellow card) 87'; Andersen (yellow card) 90' | Stadium: University of Bolton Stadium; Attendance: 5,999; Referee: Carl Boyeson |

| 26 November 2022 Second round | Barnsley | 3–0 | Crewe Alexandra | Barnsley |
| 15:00 GMT | Cole 30'; Phillips 50'; Andersen (yellow card) 53'; Benson 57' (pen.) | Report | Sambou (yellow card) 50' | Stadium: Oakwell Stadium; Attendance: 3,967; Referee: Tom Reeves |

| 7 January 2023 Third round | Derby County | 3–0 | Barnsley | Derby |
| 15:00 GMT | Collins 45+1' (pen.); Bird (yellow card) 49'; Barkhuizen 60'; Sibley (yellow card) 69'; Knight 79' | Report | Connell (yellow card) 27'; Kitching (yellow card) 68' | Stadium: Pride Park Stadium; Attendance: 11,512; Referee: Sunny Gill |

=== EFL Cup ===
Win Draw Loss Fixtures

Barnsley were drawn away to Middlesbrough in the first round and to Leeds United in the second round.

| 10 August 2022 First round | Middlesbrough | 0–1 | Barnsley | Middlesbrough |
| 19:45 BST | | Report | McCarthy (yellow card) 66'; Oduor (yellow card) 81'; J. Benson 90+3' | Stadium: Riverside Stadium; Attendance: 9,361; Referee: Ben Toner |

| 24 August 2022 Second round | Leeds United | 3–1 | Barnsley | Leeds |
| 19:45 BST | Sinisterra 21'; Klich 32' (pen.), 56'; Drameh (yellow card) 67'; Hjelde (yellow card) 68' | Report | Andersen 35'; Styles (penalty missed) 42', (yellow card) 43'; Kitching (yellow card) 67'; Williams (yellow card) 81' | Stadium: Elland Road; Attendance: 35,472; Referee: John Brooks |

=== EFL Trophy ===
On 23 June, the group stage draw was finalised, group Barnsley in Northern Group E alongside Doncaster Rovers, Lincoln City and Newcastle United U21s. In the second round, The Reds were drawn away to Port Vale.

| Pos | Div | Team | Pld | W | PW | PL | L | GF | GA | GD | Pts | Qualification |
|---|---|---|---|---|---|---|---|---|---|---|---|---|
| 1 | L1 | Lincoln City | 3 | 2 | 0 | 0 | 1 | 6 | 2 | +4 | 6 | Advance to Round 2 |
| 2 | L1 | Barnsley | 3 | 2 | 0 | 0 | 1 | 6 | 5 | +1 | 6 | Advance to Round 2 |
| 3 | L2 | Doncaster Rovers | 3 | 1 | 1 | 0 | 1 | 4 | 5 | −1 | 5 | |
| 4 | ACA | Newcastle United U21 | 3 | 0 | 0 | 1 | 2 | 0 | 4 | −4 | 1 | |

Source: EFL.com

Win Draw Loss Fixtures

| 30 August 2022 Group stage | Barnsley | 0–3 | Lincoln City | Barnsley |
| 19:00 BST | Moon (yellow card) 10'; Norwood (red card) 22'; Hondermarck (yellow card) 73' | Report | Bishop 15', 17'; Sørensen (yellow card) 90+1'; Makama 90+3' | Stadium: Oakwell Stadium; Attendance: 3,121; Referee: Martin Woods |

| 20 September 2022 Group stage | Barnsley | 2–0 | Newcastle United U21 | Barnsley |
| 19:00 BST | McCarthy (yellow card) 63'; Hondermarck (yellow card) 76'; Butterfill 79'; Larkeche 85' | Report | | Stadium: Oakwell Stadium; Attendance: 1,664; Referee: Scott Oldham |

| 11 October 2022 Group stage | Doncaster Rovers | 2–4 | Barnsley | Doncaster |
| 19:00 BST | Taylor (yellow card) 15'; Anderson (yellow card) 39'; Miller 73' 81' | Report | Martin 11' 34'; Connell (yellow card) 15'; Jalo 20' 26'; Tedić (penalty missed) 40' | Stadium: Eco-Power Stadium; Attendance: 2,479; Referee: Marc Edwards |

| 22 November 2022 Second round | Port Vale | 2–1 | Barnsley | Burslem |
| 19:00 GMT | Politic 14'; Worrall 27'; Pett (yellow card) 33' | Report | Kitching (yellow card) 45+2'; Edwards 73' | Stadium: Vale Park; Attendance: 1,306; Referee: Lewis Smith |
