= Jordan Helliwell =

English footballer (born 2001)

Personal information
- Date of birth: 23 September 2001 (age 25)
- Height: 1.75 m (5 ft 9 in)
- Position: Defender

Team information
- Current team: Gainsborough Trinity

Youth career
- 2012–2018: Barnsley

Senior career*
Years	Team	Apps	(Gls)
2018–2023	Barnsley	3	(0)
2020	→ Stalybridge Celtic (loan)	4	(0)
2021	→ Esbjerg fB (loan)	2	(0)
2022	→ Basford United (loan)	7	(0)
2023	AFC Totton	3	(0)
2023–2024	Brighouse Town	8	(0)
2024	Wakefield		
2024–	Gainsborough Trinity	11	(1)
- * Club domestic league appearances and goals as of 19:08, 4 November 2024 (UTC)

Jordan Helliwell (born 23 September 2001) is an English professional footballer who plays as a defender for Northern Premier League Premier Division club Gainsborough Trinity.

== Early and personal life ==
Helliwell attended Ossett Academy.

== Career ==
=== Barnsley ===
Helliwell joined Barnsley in April 2012 at the age of 10, and was the Academy Player of the Year for the 2017–18 season. He made his debut on 13 November 2018 in the EFL Trophy.

In October 2020 he joined Stalybridge Celtic on loan returning to Barnsley in December. He played five times whilst on loan - four Northern Premier League games and one in the FA Trophy.

In May 2021 it was announced by Barnsley that he had been retained at the club. It was announced in July, that along with fellow club players, Matty Wolfe, Steven Simpson and Charlie Winfield he was joining Barnsley's sister club Esbjerg fB in Denmark on loan for six months.

In March 2022, Helliwell signed for Basford United on loan.

Following the conclusion of the 2022–23 season, Helliwell was released by Barnsley.

=== Non-League ===
In August 2023, Helliwell joined Southern League Premier Division South side AFC Totton. In November 2023, he moved to Brighouse Town. In January 2024, he joined Northern Counties East Divisio One team Wakefield.

In June 2024, Helliwell joined Gainsborough Trinity.
