= Rémy Vita =

Footballer (born 2001)

Personal information
- Date of birth: 1 April 2001 (age 25)
- Place of birth: Alençon, France
- Height: 1.70 m (5 ft 7 in)
- Positions: Left-back; wing-back

Youth career
- 2007–2016: Alençon
- 2016–2018: Angers

Senior career*
Years	Team	Apps	(Gls)
2018–2020	Troyes II	27	(1)
2020	Troyes	5	(0)
2020–2022	Bayern Munich II	27	(2)
2021–2022	→ Barnsley (loan)	19	(0)
2022–2025	Fortuna Sittard	42	(2)
2024–2025	→ Amiens (loan)	33	(0)
2025–2026	Tondela	4	(0)

International career^{‡}
2024–	Comoros	6	(1)
- * Club domestic league appearances and goals as of 16 May 2026 ‡ National team caps and goals as of 14 November 2025

Rémy Vita (born 1 April 2001) is a professional footballer who plays as a left-back and wing-back. Born in France, he plays for the Comoros national team.

== Career ==
=== Early years ===
Vita is a youth product of his local club Alençon, where he was considered a bright talent despite his short stature, and he joined the youth academy of Angers in 2016. He was released after two years at the club, only to join Troyes' reserves in National 3. He progressed quickly through the ranks at Troyes, eventually making his professional debut for the first team in Ligue 2 on 24 August 2020, starting at left-back in a 2–0 home win over Le Havre at Stade de l'Aube. Vita made five appearances for Troyes.

=== Bayern Munich ===
On 6 October 2020, Vita joined the Bayern Munich reserves on a three-year contract for a reported fee of €1.5 million. He made his debut in the 3. Liga on 21 October 2020, replacing Alexander Lungwitz in the 28th minute of a 3–2 defeat against Viktoria Köln. Four days later, he scored his first goal in a 2–0 victory against Waldhof Mannheim. His impressive performances initially earned him a place on the first-team bench on 10 April 2021, in a 1–1 draw against Union Berlin, but he failed to make an appearance.

Vita participated in the first-team preseason training camp in the summer of 2021. He began his 2021–22 season in the Regionalliga Bayern with the reserves, as they had suffered relegation for the 3. Liga the season before.

==== Barnsley (loan) ====
On 2 September 2021, Vita joined EFL Championship club Barnsley on loan for the rest of the season. He did not make an appearance during his first months at the club, which manager Markus Schopp stated was due to the coaching staff needing time to evaluate Vita's readiness, and for him to acclimate to the team's playing style.

On 8 January 2022, he made his Barnsley debut in a thrilling 5–4 FA Cup win over Barrow after extra time. His league debut following on 25 January, where he replaced Jasper Moon in the 87th minute of a 3–0 defeat to Nottingham Forest. He was a starter during the second half of the season, and Vita made a total of 20 appearances for Barnsley, who suffered relegation at the end of the season.

=== Fortuna Sittard ===
Vita joined Eredivisie club Fortuna Sittard on 5 July 2022, for an undisclosed fee, and signed a four-year contract. He made his debut for the club on 27 August, replacing Mickaël Tırpan in the 84th minute of a 2–1 league defeat against Heerenveen. On 17 September, he scored his first goal for Fortuna, a late winner in their 1–0 league victory against Excelsior. Mainly a substitute at the start of the season, Vita made his first start for the club on 19 October in a 3–2 KNVB Cup loss to NEC.

On 24 July 2024, Vita joined Ligue 2 club Amiens on a season-long loan deal.

=== Tondela ===
On 31 July 2025, Fortuna announced Vita's transfer to Tondela in Portugal.

== International career ==
Born in France, he was called up to the Madagascar national team for the 2023 Africa Cup of Nations qualification matches against Ghana and Angola on 1 and 5 June 2022.

On 11 October 2024, Vita made his debut for the Comoros national team in a Africa Cup of Nations qualifier against Tunisia at the Hammadi Agrebi Stadium. He substituted Abdel-Hakim Abdallah in the 65th minute as Comoros won 1–0.

On 11 December 2025, Vita was called up to the Comoros squad for the 2025 Africa Cup of Nations.

== Personal life ==
Vita was born in France and is of Malagasy and Comorian descent.

== Career statistics ==
As of end of 2023–24 season

Appearances and goals by club, season and competition
Club	Season	League			National cup (Note: Includes FA Cup, KNVB Cup)		League cup (Note: Includes EFL Cup)		Other		Total	
Club	Season	Division	Apps	Goals	Apps	Goals	Apps	Goals	Apps	Goals	Apps	Goals
Troyes II	2018–19	National 3	13	0	—		—		—		13	0
Troyes II	2019–20	National 3	14	1	—		—		—		14	1
Troyes II	Total		27	1	—		—		—		27	1
Troyes	2020–21	Ligue 2	5	0	0	0	—		—		5	0
Bayern Munich II	2020–21	3. Liga	25	2	—		—		—		25	2
Bayern Munich II	2021–22	Regionalliga Bayern	2	0	—		—		—		2	0
Bayern Munich II	Total		27	2	—		—		—		27	2
Barnsley (loan)	2021–22	EFL Championship	19	0	1	0	0	0	—		20	0
Fortuna Sittard	2022–23	Eredivisie	27	2	1	0	—		—		28	2
Fortuna Sittard	2023–24	Eredivisie	15	0	2	0	—		—		17	0
Fortuna Sittard	Total		42	2	3	0	—		—		45	2
Career total			120	5	2	0	0	0	0	0	122	5

== Honours ==
Bayern Munich

- Bundesliga: 2020–21
