= Josh Benson =

English footballer (born 1999)

Personal information
- Full name: Josh Benson
- Date of birth: 5 December 1999 (age 26)
- Place of birth: Brentwood, England
- Height: 1.75 m (5 ft 9 in)
- Position: Midfielder

Youth career
- 2008–2018: Arsenal
- 2018–2019: Burnley

Senior career*
Years	Team	Apps	(Gls)
2019–2021	Burnley	6	(0)
2020	→ Grimsby Town (loan)	11	(2)
2021–2025	Barnsley	79	(4)
2025–2026	Rotherham United	24	(2)
- * Club domestic league appearances and goals as of 18:02, 2 May 2026 (UTC)

Josh Benson (born 5 December 1999) is an English professional footballer who plays as a midfielder and is a free agent.

He has previously played for Arsenal, Burnley, Grimsby Town and Barnsley.

== Career ==
=== Early career ===
Benson was born in Brentwood, Essex and is the oldest of four siblings. The family were raised in Thurrock, Essex. He attended Herringham Primary School in Chadwell St Mary, and it was here that he was selected to represent Thurrock District team following a trial. At the age of seven, an Arsenal scout spotted him playing for Thurrock in a tournament and invited for a trial. There was also interest from other clubs, Tottenham Hotspur, West Ham United and Millwall. He began training with Arsenal when he turned eight but was not originally a standout performer for the team and was one of three players to be left of the squad for a trip abroad to Spain. He later progressed to be one of the better players in the side, captaining the youth sides and eventually earning a two-year scholarship when he turned 16. In the first year of his scholarship, he sustained a knee injury which kept him out of action for four months. In the spring of 2018 he was informed by Arsenal that they would not be offering him a professional contract once his scholarship expired.

=== Burnley ===
Following his release he was invited on trial by Premier League side Burnley after hearing of his availability. In the summer of 2018, after a short trial, he was convinced to sign for the club by under-23 manager, Michael Duff, signing a two-year professional contract after a clear path to the first team was outlined. A couple of months later, Duff left to become the manager of Cheltenham Town and he was replaced by Steve Stone, but the pair formed a positive relationship. He started training with the first team on a number of occasions and made the squad for an away trip to Manchester United at Old Trafford in January 2019, but remained an unused substitute. He featured a lot for Burnley in their pre-season games for the 2019–20 season in their trip to Portugal. Following pre-season he hoped he would be part of the first team squad regularly but an injury hampered his progress. However, he remained a mainstay in the under-23 side, captaining them on a couple of occasions.

On 18 January 2020, he moved on loan to gain some first team experience, joining EFL League Two side Grimsby Town where he joined up with fellow under-23 player Anthony Glennon. The move materialised as manager, Ian Holloway, had worked with Burnley's chief operating officer Matt Williams when he was at Blackpool, doing a lot of his scouting. Williams had recommended Glennon after Grimsby were in desperate need of a left-back and Benson followed a week later after Holloway had watched him play a couple of times. He scored his first professional goal in February 2020, scoring the winner in the 86th minute against Morecambe in a 2–1 victory. The loan only lasted two months after the season was cut short because of the COVID-19 pandemic, but he had still made a good impression on Holloway, scoring twice in 11 appearances. Following the Premier League restart in July, Benson made it onto the bench for Burnley for a number of games but failed to make an appearance.

In the summer of 2020, Burnley triggered a one-year contract extension on his deal. In August 2020, Holloway was keen for Benson and Glennon to return to Grimbsy on loan and made the call to Burnley. There were offers from EFL Championship sides to go out on loan again, but due to the small size of the squad and lack of transfer activity, Burnley decided to keep him at the club. On 17 September 2020, he made his first team debut in an EFL Cup tie with Sheffield United, replacing Ashley Westwood as a substitute as the Clarets progressed on penalties. A week later he made his full debut in the same competition as Burnley beat Millwall 2–0 at The Den. On 28 November 2020, he made his Premier League debut for Burnley, replacing the injured Josh Brownhill in the starting line-up for a trip to Manchester City at the City of Manchester Stadium. He played the full 90 minutes and manager, Sean Dyche, described his performance as "terrific" despite the 5–0 defeat. Days after the game, Steve Stone suggested that plans had been outlined to send him out on loan in the January transfer window. In December 2020, after making five first team appearances, he signed a new contract until June 2023 with a further 12-month extension in the club's favour.

=== Barnsley ===
In July 2021 he signed for Barnsley for an undisclosed fee. He scored his first goal for Barnsley in an EFL Cup win over Middlesbrough on 10 August 2022. He was released by Barnsley at the end of the 2024–25 season.

=== Rotherham United ===
In July 2025 he signed for Rotherham United. On 8 May 2026 Rotherham announced he was being released after the team's relegation to EFL League Two.

== Career statistics ==
As of match played 2 May 2026

Appearances and goals by club, season and competition
Club	Season	League			FA Cup		EFL Cup		Other		Total	
Club	Season	Division	Apps	Goals	Apps	Goals	Apps	Goals	Apps	Goals	Apps	Goals
Burnley	2019–20	Premier League	0	0	0	0	0	0	—		0	0
Burnley	2020–21	Premier League	6	0	3	0	3	0	—		12	0
Burnley	Total		6	0	3	0	3	0	0	0	12	0
Grimsby Town (loan)	2019–20	League Two	11	2	0	0	0	0	0	0	11	2
Barnsley	2021–22	Championship	25	0	1	0	1	0	0	0	27	0
Barnsley	2022–23	League One	35	3	3	1	2	1	3 (Note: One appearance in the EFL Trophy, two appearances in the play-offs.)	0	43	5
Barnsley	2023–24	League One	6	0	0	0	0	0	2 (Note: Appearances in the EFL Trophy.)	0	8	0
Barnsley	2024–25	League One	13	1	0	0	0	0	3	0	16	1
Barnsley	Total		79	4	4	1	3	1	8	0	94	6
Rotherham United	2025–26	League One	24	2	0	0	0	0	1	3	25	5
Career total			120	8	7	1	6	1	9	3	142	13
