= Slobodan Tedić =

Serbian footballer

Personal information
- Full name: Slobodan Tedić
- Date of birth: 13 April 2000 (age 26)
- Place of birth: Podgorica, FR Yugoslavia
- Height: 1.90 m (6 ft 3 in)
- Position: Centre-forward

Team information
- Current team: Akron Tolyatti
- Number: 9

Youth career
- Vojvodina
- 2017–2018: Čukarički

Senior career*
Years	Team	Apps	(Gls)
2017–2020	Čukarički	66	(13)
2020–2024	Manchester City	0	(0)
2020–2022	→ PEC Zwolle (loan)	38	(2)
2022–2023	→ Barnsley (loan)	21	(4)
2023–2024	→ Charlton Athletic (loan)	12	(2)
2024–2026	Čukarički	68	(18)
2026–	Akron Tolyatti	12	(0)

International career^{‡}
2017	Serbia U17	3	(0)
2018–2019	Serbia U19	4	(0)
2019–2022	Serbia U21	15	(2)
- * Club domestic league appearances and goals as of 21 November 2026 ‡ National team caps and goals as of 16 September 2023

Slobodan Tedić (Serbian Cyrillic: Слободан Тедић; born 13 April 2000) is a Serbian professional footballer who plays as a centre forward for Russian Premier League club Akron Tolyatti.

== Club career ==
Born in Podgorica, Montenegro, Tedić debuted in the Serbian SuperLiga with FK Čukarički in the 2017–18 season.

In September 2019, a deal was agreed for Tedić to join Manchester City in January 2020. He remained on loan at his former club until the end of the 2019–20 season.

On 1 September 2020, Tedić joined Eredivisie side PEC Zwolle on a season-long loan deal. On 28 May 2021, the loan had been extended.

On 4 August 2022, Tedić signed for League One club Barnsley on loan for the 2022–23 season. He scored his first goal for Barnsley on 18 March 2023 in a 1–0 win against Wycombe Wanderers.

On 1 September 2023, Tedić signed for League One club Charlton Athletic on loan for the 2023–24 season.

On 5 January 2024, it was confirmed that Tedić had returned to Manchester City. Later that month, he rejoined FK Čukarički in Serbia on a free transfer.

On 12 June 2026, Tedić signed a four-year contract with Akron Tolyatti in Russia.

== International career ==
Tedić has represented Serbia at all youth levels, from U17 to U21s.

== Career statistics ==
As of 21 November 2026

Club	Season	League			Cup		Continental		Other		Total	
Club	Season	Division	Apps	Goals	Apps	Goals	Apps	Goals	Apps	Goals	Apps	Goals
Čukarički	2017–18	Serbian SuperLiga	8	1	1	0	—		—		9	1
Čukarički	2018–19	Serbian SuperLiga	31	3	0	0	—		—		31	3
Čukarički	2019–20	Serbian SuperLiga	27	9	4	4	4 (Note: Appearances in UEFA Europa League)	3	—		35	16
Čukarički	Total		66	13	5	4	4	3	0	0	75	20
PEC Zwolle (loan)	2020–21	Eredivisie	15	2	1	0	—		—		16	2
PEC Zwolle (loan)	2021–22	Eredivisie	23	0	2	1	—		—		25	1
PEC Zwolle (loan)	Total		38	2	3	1	0	0	0	0	41	3
Barnsley (loan)	2022–23	EFL League One	21	4	1	0	—		7 (Note: Three appearances in play-offs, one appearance in EFL Cup, three appearances in EFL Trophy)	0	29	4
Charlton Athletic (loan)	2023–24	EFL League One	12	2	2	0	—		3 (Note: Appearances in EFL Trophy)	0	17	2
Čukarički	2023–24	Serbian SuperLiga	5	0	0	0	—		—		5	0
Čukarički	2024–25	Serbian SuperLiga	27	5	2	0	—		—		29	5
Čukarički	2025–26	Serbian SuperLiga	36	13	0	0	—		—		36	13
Čukarički	Total		68	18	2	0	0	0	0	0	70	18
Čukarički	Club total		134	31	7	4	4	3	0	0	145	38
Akron Tolyatti	2026–27	Russian Premier League	12	0	2	0	—		—		14	0
Career total			217	39	15	5	4	3	10	0	246	47

== Honours ==
Individual

- Serbian SuperLiga Player of the Week: 2025–26 (Round 9),
