= Joe Ackroyd =

English footballer (born 2002)

Personal information
- Date of birth: 6 September 2002 (age 24)
- Place of birth: Barnsley, England
- Height: 1.74 m (5 ft 9 in)
- Position: Defensive midfielder

Team information
- Current team: Bradford (Park Avenue)

Youth career
- 2012–2022: Barnsley

Senior career*
Years	Team	Apps	(Gls)
2022–2024	Barnsley	0	(0)
2022	→ MFK Vyškov (loan)	13	(1)
2022	→ Guiseley (loan)	10	(1)
2023	→ Buxton (loan)	23	(3)
2024	→ Buxton (loan)	15	(0)
2024–2025	Guiseley	33	(2)
2025	→ Warrington Town (loan)	5	(0)
2025–	Bradford (Park Avenue)	0	(0)
- * Club domestic league appearances and goals as of 12:34, 20 June 2025 (UTC)

Joe Ackroyd (born 6 September 2002) is an English professional footballer who plays as a defensive midfielder for Northern Premier League Division One East club Bradford (Park Avenue).

== Career ==
Ackroyd joined Barnsley as a 10-year-old in November 2012. On 8 January 2022, he made his senior debut as a substitute during extra time in a 5–4 win over Barrow in the FA Cup. On 25 February 2022, Ackroyd joined Czech National Football League side MFK Vyškov on loan until the end of the season. On 5 March 2022, he made his debut as a substitute in a 4–1 win over Opava.

On 27 September 2022, Ackroyd signed for Northern Premier League Premier Division club Guiseley on a one-month loan deal. The loan was extended before he was recalled on 16 December 2022, having made 13 appearances in all competitions. On 10 January 2023, Ackroyd joined National League North side Buxton on a one-month loan. The following month, the loan was extended. After the loan, he extended his contract at Barnsley for another year. After another spell on loan at Buxton, Ackroyd was released by Barnsley at the end of the season and joined Guiseley on a one-year deal. On 28 February 2025, Ackroyd joined National League North side Warrington Town on a one-month loan deal.

On 17 June 2025, Ackroyd joined Northern Premier League Division One East side Bradford (Park Avenue).

== Career statistics ==
As of end of 2024–25 season

Appearances and goals by club, season and competition
Club	Season	League			National Cup (Note: Includes FA Cup, Czech Cup)		League Cup (Note: Includes EFL Cup)		Other		Total	
Club	Season	Division	Apps	Goals	Apps	Goals	Apps	Goals	Apps	Goals	Apps	Goals
Barnsley	2021–22	EFL Championship	0	0	1	0	0	0	0	0	1	0
Barnsley	2022–23	EFL League One	0	0	0	0	0	0	2 (Note: Appearances in EFL Trophy)	0	2	0
Barnsley	2023–24	EFL League One	0	0	0	0	0	0	1	0	1	0
Barnsley	Total		0	0	1	0	0	0	3	0	4	0
MFK Vyškov (loan)	2021–22	Czech National Football League	13	1	0	0	–		0	0	13	1
Guiseley (loan)	2022–23	NPL Premier Division	10	1	0	0	–		3 (Note: Appearances in FA Trophy)	2	13	3
Buxton (loan)	2022–23	National League North	23	3	0	0	–		0	0	23	3
Buxton (loan)	2023–24	National League North	15	0	0	0	–		0	0	15	0
Guiseley	2024–25	NPL Premier Division	33	2	5	0	–		1	0	39	2
Warrington Town (loan)	2024–25	National League North	5	0	0	0	–		0	0	5	0
Career total			99	7	6	0	0	0	7	2	112	9
