= 2021–22 Barnsley F.C. season =

Barnsley
2021–22 season
- Owner: Chien Lee; Pacific Media Group; James Cryne; Neerav Parekh; Billy Beane
- Co-Chairman: Chien Lee; Paul Conway
- Head Coach: Markus Schopp (Until 1 November); Poya Asbaghi (Between 15 November-24 April); Martin Devaney (Caretaker Manager, April 2022-present)
- Stadium: Oakwell
- Championship: 24th (relegated)
- FA Cup: Fourth round
- EFL Cup: First round
- Top goalscorer: League: Carlton Morris (7); All: Carlton Morris (9)
Home colours	Away colours	Third colours

The 2021–22 season is Barnsley's 135th year in existence and their third consecutive season in the Championship. Along with the league, the club will also compete in the FA Cup and the EFL Cup. The season covers the period from 1 July 2021 to 30 June 2022.

== Managerial changes ==
During pre-season, Valérien Ismaël departed the club as head coach and joined West Bromwich Albion. Five days later Markus Schopp was appointed head coach on a three-year contract.

== Pre-season friendlies ==
Barnsley revealed as part of their pre-season preparations, they would have pre-season friendly matches against AFC Fylde, Rochdale, Sheffield Wednesday, Morecambe, Watford and Manchester City.

6 July 2021 Friendly	AFC Fylde	Cancelled	Barnsley	Medlar-with-Wesham
19:30 BST				Stadium: Mill Farm Sports Village
Note: Postponed due to Covid-19 restrictions placed by the Director of Public Health.

14 July 2021 Friendly	Rochdale	1–2	Barnsley	Spotland
13:00 BST	Morley 53' (pen.)	Report	Morris 12'; Kitching 19'	Stadium: Crown Oil Arena; Attendance: 0 (Behind-closed-doors)

17 July 2021 Friendly	Barnsley	2–0	Sheffield Wednesday	Barnsley
12:00 BST	Williams 21'; Oduor 69'	Report		Stadium: Oakwell Training Ground; Attendance: 0 (Behind-closed-doors)

23 July 2021 Friendly	Barnsley	0–0	Morecambe	Loughborough
14:00 BST		Report		Stadium: Loughborough University; Attendance: 0 (Behind-closed-doors)

31 July 2021 Friendly	Watford	Cancelled	Barnsley	Watford
16:00 BST				Stadium: Vicarage Road
Note: Match was later cancelled.

31 July 2021 Friendly	Manchester City	4–0	Barnsley	Manchester
18:00 BST	Edozie 23'; Knight 30'; Mahrez 34'; Aké 69'	Report		Stadium: Academy Stadium; Attendance: 0 (Behind-closed-doors)

== Competitions ==
=== Championship ===
==== League table ====
Pos	Team	Pld	W	D	L	GF	GA	GD	Pts	Promotion, qualification or relegation
19	Hull City	46	14	9	23	41	54	−13	51	
20	Birmingham City	46	11	14	21	50	75	−25	47	
21	Reading	46	13	8	25	54	87	−33	41 (Note: Reading were deducted 6 points for breach of profit and sustainability regulations.)	
22	Peterborough United (R)	46	9	10	27	43	87	−44	37	Relegation to EFL League One
23	Derby County (R)	46	14	13	19	45	53	−8	34 (Note: Derby County were deducted 12 points for entering administration, and a further 9 points for financial irregularities.)	Relegation to EFL League One
24	Barnsley (R)	46	6	12	28	33	73	−40	30	Relegation to EFL League One

Source: EFL Official Website
Rules for classification: 1) Points; 2) Goal difference; 3) Number of goals scored; 4) Head-to-head results; 5) Wins; 6) Away goals; 7) Penalty points (sec 9.5); 8) 12-point sending off offences
(R) Relegated

==== Results summary ====
Overall								Home						Away					
Pld	W	D	L	GF	GA	GD	Pts	W	D	L	GF	GA	GD	W	D	L	GF	GA	GD
46	6	12	28	33	73	−40	30	5	7	11	18	29	−11	1	5	17	15	44	−29

Last updated: 7 May 2022.

==== Results by matchday ====
Matchday	1	2	3	4	5	6	7	8	9	10	11	12	13	14	15	16	17	18	19	20	21	22	23	24	25	26	27	28	29	30	31	32	33	34	35	36	37	38	39	40	41	42	43	44	45	46
Home/away	A	H	H	A	H	A	A	H	A	H	H	A	A	H	A	H	H	A	H	A	H	A	H	A	A	A	H	H	A	H	A	A	H	A	H	H	H	A	H	A	A	H	A	H	H	A
Result	D	W	L	D	D	L	D	D	L	L	L	L	L	L	L	W	L	L	L	D	D	L	D	L	L	L	L	L	L	W	L	W	W	L	D	D	W	L	D	L	D	L	L	L	L	L
Position	9	9	13	13	14	17	18	19	20	21	22	22	23	23	23	22	23	23	23	23	23	23	23	24	24	24	24	24	24	24	24	24	22	23	23	22	22	22	22	22	24	24	24	24	24	24

Updated to match(es) played on 7 May 2022. Source: Statto.com
A = Away; H = Home; W = Win; D = Draw; L = Loss

==== Matches ====
Barnsley's league fixtures were announced on 24 June 2021.

7 August 2021 1	Cardiff City	1–1	Barnsley	Leckwith
15:00 BST	Pack 54'	Report	Sibbick 69'	Stadium: Cardiff City Stadium; Attendance: 17,431; Referee: Stephen Martin

14 August 2021 2	Barnsley	1–0	Coventry City	Barnsley
15:00 BST	Frieser 39', (yellow card) 71'; Palmer (yellow card) 50'; Sibbick (yellow card) 68'; Styles (yellow card) 81'; Woodrow (yellow card) 82'; Collins (yellow card) 85'; Benson (yellow card) 87'; Kitching (yellow card) 88'	Report	Dabo (yellow card) 74'; O'Hare (yellow card) 89'; Gyökeres (penalty missed) 90+3'	Stadium: Oakwell; Attendance: 16,961; Referee: John Busby

17 August 2021 3	Barnsley	0–1	Luton Town	Barnsley
19:45 BST	Helik (yellow card) 37'	Report	Bell 4'; Muskwe (yellow card) 41'; Adebayo (yellow card) 45'; Lansbury (yellow card) 57'; Cornick (yellow card) 90+2'	Stadium: Oakwell; Attendance: 12,999; Referee: Oliver Langford

21 August 2021 4	Queens Park Rangers	2–2	Barnsley	White City
12:30 BST	Barbet (yellow card) 56'; Chair 76', (yellow card) 78'; Austin 90+1'	Report	Frieser 14'; Woodrow 27'; Benson (yellow card) 49'; Styles (yellow card) 56'; Kitching (yellow card) 70'	Stadium: Kiyan Prince Foundation Stadium; Attendance: 11,882; Referee: Gavin Ward
Note: Live on Sky Sports

28 August 2021 5	Barnsley	1–1	Birmingham City	Barnsley
15:00 BST	Styles 6', (yellow card) 86'; Palmer (yellow card) 29'	Report	Woods (yellow card) 25'; Jutkiewicz 33'; Chong (yellow card) 58'; Dean (yellow card) 65'; Pedersen (yellow card) 80'	Stadium: Oakwell; Attendance: 13,950; Referee: Matt Donohue

11 September 2021 6	Bournemouth	3–0	Barnsley	Kings Park
15:00 BST	Zemura 8', 82'; Billing (yellow card) 23'; Kelly (yellow card) 36'; Solanke 46'; Lerma (yellow card) 90+6'	Report	Helik (yellow card) 60'; Brittain (yellow card) 88'; Moon (yellow card) 90+6'	Stadium: Vitality Stadium; Attendance: 9,486; Referee: James Linington

15 September 2021 7	Stoke City	1–1	Barnsley	Stoke-on-Trent
19:45 BST	Surridge 17'; Vrančić (penalty missed) 45+3'; Østigård (yellow card) 78'; Smith (red card) 85'	Report	Brittain (yellow card) 20'; Woodrow 38'; Collins (yellow card) 45+2'; Helik (yellow card) 45+3'; Adeboyejo (yellow card) 82'; Hondermarck (yellow card) 90+3'	Stadium: bet365 Stadium; Attendance: 17,832; Referee: Leigh Doughty

18 September 2021 8	Barnsley	0–0	Blackburn Rovers	Barnsley
15:00 BST		Report	Dolan (yellow card) 47'	Stadium: Oakwell; Attendance: 13,640; Referee: Andy Woolmer

25 September 2021 9	Blackpool	1–0	Barnsley	Blackpool
15:00 BST	Lavery 32'; Wintle (yellow card) 64'	Report	Moon (yellow card) 58'; Benson (yellow card) 70'; Leya Iseka (yellow card) 89'	Stadium: Bloomfield Road; Attendance: 12,698; Referee: Steve Martin

29 September 2021 10	Barnsley	1–3	Nottingham Forest	Barnsley
19:45 BST	Woodrow 20' (pen.); Palmer (yellow card) 34'	Report	Zinckernagel 61'; Johnson 68'; Grabban 82'	Stadium: Oakwell; Attendance: 13,657; Referee: Geoff Eltringham

2 October 2021 11	Barnsley	0–1	Millwall	Barnsley
15:00 BST	Palmer (yellow card) 45+1'; Adeboyejo (yellow card) 69'	Report	Evans (yellow card) 32'; Wallace 89'	Stadium: Oakwell; Attendance: 11,888; Referee: David Webb

16 October 2021 12	Reading	1–0	Barnsley	Reading
15:00 BST	Swift 77'	Report	Brittain (yellow card) 29'; Gomes (yellow card) 56'	Stadium: Select Car Leasing Stadium; Attendance: 12,199; Referee: Andy Davies

20 October 2021 13	Middlesbrough	2–0	Barnsley	Middlesbrough
19:45 BST	Šporar 20'; Peltier (yellow card) 73'; Crooks 87'	Report	Moon (yellow card) 86'	Stadium: Riverside Stadium; Attendance: 17,931; Referee: Andrew Madley

24 October 2021 14	Barnsley	2–3	Sheffield United	Barnsley
12:30 BST	Cole 78'; Leya Iseka 82'	Report	Mousset 51', (yellow card) 52', (goal) 53'; Stevens (yellow card) 56'; Osborn 72'	Stadium: Oakwell; Attendance: 15,720; Referee: Gavin Ward

30 October 2021 15	Bristol City	2–1	Barnsley	Ashton Gate
15:00 BST	Weimann 42', 45+2'	Report	Leya Iseka 28'	Stadium: Ashton Gate; Referee: Thomas Bramall

3 November 2021 16	Barnsley	2–1	Derby County	Barnsley
19:45 GMT	Adeboyejo 39'; Leya Iseka 50'; Brittain (yellow card) 64'; Andersen (yellow card) 81'	Report	Morrison (yellow card) 15'; Baldock 24'; Buchanan (yellow card) 50'	Stadium: Oakwell; Attendance: 13,786; Referee: Robert Jones

6 November 2021 17	Barnsley	0–2	Hull City	Barnsley
15:00 GMT	Benson (yellow card) 66'; Brittain (yellow card) 88'	Report	Honeyman (yellow card) 26', (goal) 33'; Greaves (yellow card) 50'; Lewis-Potter 75'	Stadium: Oakwell; Attendance: 13,003; Referee: Steve Martin

20 November 2021 18	Fulham	4–1	Barnsley	Fulham
15:00 GMT	Mitrović 24'; Carvalho 34'; Kebano 72'; Wilson 81'	Report	Adeboyejo 78'	Stadium: Craven Cottage; Referee: Josh Smith

24 November 2021 19	Barnsley	0–2	Swansea City	Barnsley
19:45 GMT	Brittain (yellow card) 85'; Oularé (yellow card) 87'	Report	Naughton (yellow card) 31'; Bennett (yellow card) 65'; Ntcham 74'; Paterson 79'; Smith (yellow card) 89'	Stadium: Oakwell; Attendance: 11,342; Referee: David Webb

27 November 2021 20	Peterborough United	0–0	Barnsley	Peterborough
15:00 GMT	Butler (yellow card) 29'; Coventry (yellow card) 36'; Norburn (yellow card) 74'	Report	Andersen (yellow card) 78'; Gomes (yellow card) 83'	Stadium: Weston Homes Stadium; Referee: John Busby

4 December 2021 21	Barnsley	1–1	Huddersfield Town	Barnsley
15:00 GMT	Morris 45+2', (yellow card) 90+2'; Helik (yellow card) 71'	Report	O'Brien 33'	Stadium: Oakwell; Attendance: 15,190; Referee: Matt Donohue

11 December 2021 22	Preston North End	2–1	Barnsley	Preston
15:00 GMT	Browne 57'; Johnson 78'	Report	Woodrow (yellow card) 27', (goal) 65'; Andersen (yellow card) 77'	Stadium: Deepdale; Attendance: 11,106; Referee: Keith Stroud

17 December 2021 23	Barnsley	0–0	West Bromwich Albion	Barnsley
19:45 GMT	Helik (yellow card) 90+2'	Report	Livermore (yellow card) 52'; Townsend (yellow card) 70'; Molumby (yellow card) 90+5'	Stadium: Oakwell; Referee: Tim Robinson

26 December 2021	Barnsley	v	Stoke City	Barnsley
15:00 GMT				Stadium: Oakwell

29 December 2021 24	Blackburn Rovers	2–1	Barnsley	Blackburn
19:45 GMT	Rothwell 24'; Brereton 65'; Lenihan (yellow card) 67'; Gallagher (yellow card) 83'; Kaminski (yellow card) 88'	Report	Morris 45+1'; Benson (yellow card) 64'	Stadium: Ewood Park; Attendance: 14,228; Referee: Dean Whitestone

22 January 2022 25	Birmingham City	2–1	Barnsley	Bordesley
15:00 GMT	Hernández 34'; Hogan 51'; Gardner (yellow card) 90'	Report	Palmer (yellow card) 38'; Adeboyejo 87'; Helik (yellow card) 90+5'	Stadium: St Andrew's; Attendance: 15,742; Referee: Tony Harrington

25 January 2022 26	Nottingham Forest	3–0	Barnsley	West Bridgford
19:45 GMT	Davis 15', (yellow card) 61'; Yates 38'; Garner (yellow card) 52'; Johnson 75'	Report	Palmer (yellow card) 7'; Andersen (yellow card) 12'; Helik (yellow card) 61'	Stadium: The City Ground; Attendance: 27,504; Referee: Michael Salisbury

29 January 2022 27	Barnsley	0–1	Bournemouth	Barnsley
15:00 GMT		Report	Billing 12'; Cahill (yellow card) 66' (yellow-red card) 88'; Solanke (yellow card) 71'; Zemura (yellow card) 90+2'	Stadium: Oakwell; Attendance: 11,972; Referee: Andre Marriner

2 February 2022 28	Barnsley	0–1	Cardiff City	Barnsley
19:45 GMT	Andersen (yellow card) 59'; Williams (yellow card) 64'	Report	McGuiness (yellow card) 39'; Doyle (yellow card) 66'; Ikpeazu 71', (yellow card) 72'; Flint (yellow card) 90+2'	Stadium: Oakwell; Attendance: 11,432; Referee: Geoff Eltringham

8 February 2022 29	Luton Town	2–1	Barnsley	Luton
19:45 GMT	Campbell 28', (yellow card) 87'; Adebayo 59' (pen.)	Report	Morris 44'; Collins (yellow card) 60'; Kitching (yellow card) 89'	Stadium: Kenilworth Road; Attendance: 9,101; Referee: Geoff Eltringham

12 February 2022 30	Barnsley	1–0	Queens Park Rangers	Barnsley
15:00 GMT	Quina (yellow card) 59', (goal) 74'	Report	Dickie (yellow card) 75'	Stadium: Oakwell; Attendance: 12,476; Referee: Michael Salisbury

19 February 2022 31	Coventry City	1–0	Barnsley	Coventry
15:00 GMT	Hyam 90+3'	Report	Quina (yellow card) 68'; Morris (yellow card) 90+9'	Stadium: Coventry Building Society Arena; Attendance: 17,104; Referee: Josh Smith

22 February 2022 32	Hull City	0–2	Barnsley	Kingston upon Hull
19:45 GMT	Fleming (yellow card) 45+1'	Report	Styles 27'; Morris 45+2'	Stadium: MKM Stadium; Attendance: 16,421; Referee: Steve Martin

26 February 2022 33	Barnsley	3–2	Middlesbrough	Barnsley
15:00 GMT	Andersen 7'; Bassi 16', 54'; Vita (yellow card) 62'; Kitching (yellow card) 72'; Collins (yellow card) 79'	Report	Šporar 61' (pen.); Kitching 90+5' (o.g.)	Stadium: Oakwell Stadium; Attendance: 16,107; Referee: James Linington

5 March 2022 34	Derby County	2–0	Barnsley	Derby
15:00 GMT	Morrison 22', 47'	Report	Wolfe (yellow card) 7'; Morris (yellow card) 90+4'	Stadium: Pride Park Stadium; Attendance: 25,891; Referee: Robert Jones

8 March 2022 35	Barnsley	1–1	Stoke City	Barnsley
19:45 GMT	Quina 70', (yellow card) 90+6'; Helik (yellow card) 90+7'	Report	Baker 90+5'	Stadium: Oakwell Stadium; Attendance: 12,512; Referee: Leigh Doughty

12 March 2022 36	Barnsley	1–1	Fulham	Barnsley
12:30 GMT	Wolfe (yellow card) 23'; Morris 44' (pen.), (yellow card) 61'; Kitching (yellow card) 54'; Quina (yellow card) 73'	Report	Adarabioyo (yellow card) 43'; Ream (yellow card) 66'; Robinson (yellow card) 70'; Wilson 86'	Stadium: Oakwell Stadium; Referee: Tim Robinson

15 March 2022 37	Barnsley	2–0	Bristol City	Barnsley
19:45 GMT	Morris 10'; Helik 21'	Report		Stadium: Oakwell Stadium; Attendance: 11,322; Referee: David Webb

19 March 2022 38	Sheffield United	2–0	Barnsley	Sheffield
12:30 GMT	Berge 54'; Gordon (yellow card) 58'; Gibbs-White 76'	Report	Brittain (yellow card) 72'	Stadium: Bramall Lane; Referee: Matt Donohue

2 April 2022 39	Barnsley	1–1	Reading	Barnsley
15:00 BST	Morris 5'; Andersen (yellow card) 11'; Brittain (yellow card) 66'	Report	Swift (yellow card) 34'; Ince (yellow card) 56'; Laurent 82'	Stadium: Oakwell Stadium; Attendance: 14,149; Referee: Keith Stroud

9 April 2022 40	Millwall	4–1	Barnsley	Bermondsey
15:00 BST	McNamara 31', 47'; Burke 58'; Afobe (yellow card) 70', (goal) 72'	Report	Kitching (yellow card) 26'; Palmer 49'	Stadium: The Den; Attendance: 13,231; Referee: Oliver Langford

15 April 2022 41	Swansea City	1–1	Barnsley	Landore
15:00 BST	Ntcham 64'; Grimes (yellow card) 90+2'	Report	Wolfe (yellow card) 16'; Palmer (yellow card) 29'; Gomes 54'; Morris (yellow card) 78'	Stadium: Swansea.com Stadium; Attendance: 17,923; Referee: Andy Woolmer

18 April 2022 42	Barnsley	0–2	Peterborough United	Barnsley
15:00 BST	Palmer (yellow card) 59'	Report	Marriott 25', (yellow card) 60'; Poku (yellow card) 52'; Kent 75'	Stadium: Oakwell Stadium; Attendance: 12,197; Referee: Darren Bond

22 April 2022 43	Huddersfield Town	2–1	Barnsley	Huddersfield
19:45 BST	Rhodes 4'; Toffolo 45+1'	Report	Wolfe (yellow card) 51'; Kitching (yellow card) 52'; Palmer (yellow card) 56'; Styles 90+7'	Stadium: John Smith's Stadium; Referee: James Linington

26 April 2022 44	Barnsley	0–2	Blackpool	Barnsley
19:45 BST	Andersen (yellow card) 9'	Report	Dale 39'; Virtue (yellow card) 62'; Casey 66'	Stadium: Oakwell Stadium; Attendance: 12,256; Referee: John Busby

30 April 2022 45	Barnsley	1–3	Preston North End	Barnsley
12:30 BST	Marsh 17'	Report	Johnson 23', 54'; Riis Jakobsen 74'	Stadium: Oakwell Stadium; Attendance: 13,190; Referee: David Webb

7 May 2022 46	West Bromwich Albion	4–0	Barnsley	West Bromwich
12:30 BST	Grant 37' (pen.), 60', (penalty missed) 69'; Reach 40'; Clarke 52'	Report	Wolfe (yellow card) 88'	Stadium: The Hawthorns; Attendance: 21,515; Referee: Leigh Doughty

=== FA Cup ===
Barnsley were drawn at home to Barrow in the third round.

8 January 2022 Third round	Barnsley	5–4 (a.e.t.)	Barrow	Barnsley
15:00 GMT	Andersen 23'; Styles (yellow card) 31'; Williams 42'; Moon (yellow card) 60'; Cole 83'; Morris 88', 102', (yellow card) 120+2'	Report	Beadling (red card) 38'; Banks 61', (yellow card) 68'; Glennon 78'; Jones 86'; Kay 90'; Arthur (yellow card) 115'; Devitt (yellow card) 120+2'	Stadium: Oakwell; Attendance: 4,755; Referee: Ross Joyce

5 February 2022 Fourth round	Huddersfield Town	1–0	Barnsley	Huddersfield
15:00 GMT	Holmes 19'; Koroma (yellow card) 40'; Turton (yellow card) 50'	Report	Kitching (yellow card) 89'; Helik (yellow card) 90+2'	Stadium: John Smith's Stadium; Attendance: 16,607; Referee: Jeremy Simpson

=== EFL Cup ===
On 24 June 2021, the first round draw was confirmed.

10 August 2021 First round	Bolton Wanderers	0–0 (5–4 p)	Barnsley	Horwich
20:00 BST	Jones (yellow card) 68'	Report	Benson (yellow card) 13'; Moon (yellow card) 46'; Kane (yellow card) 82'	Stadium: University of Bolton Stadium; Attendance: 7,147; Referee: Ollie Yates
	Penalties
	Sarcevic (penalty scored); Isgrove (penalty scored); Bakayoko (penalty scored); Kachunga (penalty scored); Sheehan (penalty scored)		Benson (penalty scored); Kane (penalty scored); Helik (penalty scored); Williams (penalty scored); Cole (penalty missed)

== Statistics ==
As of 7 April 2022
Players with names in italics and marked * were on loan from another club for the whole of their season with Barnsley.

No.	Pos	Nat	Player	Total		Championship		FA Cup		League Cup	
No.	Pos	Nat	Player	Apps	Goals	Apps	Goals	Apps	Goals	Apps	Goals
1	GK	(England) ENG	Jack Walton	9	0	5+1	0	2+0	0	1+0	0
2	DF	(England) ENG	Jordan Williams	24	1	17+4	0	2+0	1	1+0	0
4	MF	(Hungary) HUN	Callum Styles	46	3	40+3	3	2+0	0	1+0	0
5	DF	(England) ENG	Liam Kitching	33	0	28+3	0	2+0	0	0+0	0
6	DF	(Denmark) DEN	Mads Andersen	29	2	27+0	1	2+0	1	0+0	0
7	DF	(England) ENG	Callum Brittain	36	0	33+2	0	1+0	0	0+0	0
9	FW	(England) ENG	Cauley Woodrow	28	4	25+2	4	0+0	0	1+0	0
10	MF	(England) ENG	Josh Benson	27	0	14+11	0	0+1	0	1+0	0
11	FW	(Belgium) BEL	Aaron Leya Iseka	26	3	14+11	3	1+0	0	0+0	0
14	FW	(England) ENG	Carlton Morris	29	9	25+2	7	0+2	2	0+0	0
15	DF	(England) ENG	Jasper Moon	27	0	18+7	0	1+0	0	1+0	0
17	MF	(France) FRA	Claudio Gomes*	32	1	28+3	1	1+0	0	0+0	0
18	MF	(Wales) WAL	Isaac Christie-Davies	2	0	1+1	0	0+0	0	0+0	0
21	MF	(England) ENG	Romal Palmer	35	1	24+9	1	2+0	0	0+0	0
22	MF	(Kenya) KEN	Clarke Oduor	21	0	9+11	0	0+0	0	1+0	0
23	MF	(Republic of Ireland) IRL	William Hondermarck	11	0	3+7	0	0+1	0	0+0	0
24	DF	(Finland) FIN	Aapo Halme	7	0	2+3	0	1+0	0	1+0	0
26	DF	(France) FRA	Rémy Vita*	19	0	17+1	0	1+0	0	0+0	0
27	MF	(Morocco) MAR	Amine Bassi*	15	2	13+1	2	1+0	0	0+0	0
28	MF	(Portugal) POR	Domingos Quina*	15	2	15+0	2	0+0	0	0+0	0
29	FW	(Nigeria) NGR	Victor Adeboyejo	27	3	7+18	3	1+0	0	1+0	0
30	DF	(Poland) POL	Michał Helik	40	1	38+0	1	0+1	0	1+0	0
32	DF	(England) ENG	Jason Sraha	2	0	2+0	0	0+0	0	0+0	0
33	MF	(England) ENG	Matty Wolfe	15	0	13+2	0	0+0	0	0+0	0
34	FW	(England) ENG	David Bremang	2	0	0+2	0	0+0	0	0+0	0
37	FW	(England) ENG	Aiden Marsh	5	1	2+2	1	1+0	0	0+0	0
38	DF	(England) ENG	Jordan Helliwell	2	0	1+1	0	0+0	0	0+0	0
40	GK	(England) ENG	Brad Collins	40	0	40+0	0	0+0	0	0+0	0
44	FW	(England) ENG	Devante Cole	27	2	8+16	1	1+1	1	0+1	0
46	FW	(England) ENG	Cameron Thompson	2	0	0+1	0	0+0	0	0+1	0
Players out on loan:
8	MF	(England) ENG	Herbie Kane	1	0	0+0	0	0+0	0	0+1	0
25	FW	(England) ENG	George Miller	1	0	0+0	0	0+0	0	1+0	0
41	MF	(England) ENG	Joe Ackroyd	1	0	0+0	0	0+1	0	0+0	0
58	FW	(Belgium) BEL	Obbi Oularé	2	0	0+2	0	0+0	0	0+0	0
Players who left the club:
3	DF	(Wales) WAL	Ben Williams	5	0	5+0	0	0+0	0	0+0	0
20	DF	(England) ENG	Toby Sibbick	12	1	11+1	1	0+0	0	0+0	0
28	FW	(Austria) AUT	Dominik Frieser	14	2	12+2	2	0+0	0	0+0	0

=== Goals record ===
As of 7 May 2022

Rank	No.	Nat.	Po.	Name	Championship	FA Cup	League Cup	Total
1	14	(England)	CF	Carlton Morris	7	2	0	9
2	9	(England)	CF	Cauley Woodrow	4	0	0	4
3	4	(Hungary)	LM	Callum Styles	3	0	0	3
3	11	(England)	CF	Aaron Leya Iseka	3	0	0	3
3	29	(Nigeria)	CF	Victor Adeboyejo	3	0	0	3
6	6	(Denmark)	CB	Mads Juel Andersen	1	1	0	2
6	27	(Morocco)	AM	Amine Bassi	2	0	0	2
6	~~28~~	(Austria)	RW	Dominik Frieser	2	0	0	2
6	28	(Portugal)	CM	Domingos Quina	2	0	0	2
6	44	(England)	CF	Devante Cole	1	1	0	1
11	2	(England)	RB	Jordan Williams	0	1	0	1
11	17	(France)	DM	Claudio Gomes	1	0	0	1
11	21	(England)	CM	Romal Palmer	1	0	0	1
11	30	(Poland)	CB	Michał Helik	1	0	0	1
11	37	(England)	CF	Aiden Marsh	1	0	0	1
Total					32	5	0	37

=== Disciplinary record ===
As of 7 May 2022

Rank	No.	Nat.	Po.	Name	Championship			FA Cup			League Cup			Total		
Rank	No.	Nat.	Po.	Name	Booked	(yellow card) (yellow-red card)	Sent off (straight red)	Booked	(yellow card) (yellow-red card)	Sent off (straight red)	Booked	(yellow card) (yellow-red card)	Sent off (straight red)	Booked	(yellow card) (yellow-red card)	Sent off (straight red)
1	30	(Poland)	CB	Michał Helik	8	0	0	1	0	0	0	0	0	9	0	0
2	5	(England)	CB	Liam Kitching	7	0	0	1	0	0	0	0	0	8	0	0
2	21	(England)	CM	Romal Palmer	8	0	0	0	0	0	0	0	0	8	0	0
4	6	(Denmark)	CB	Mads Juel Andersen	7	0	0	0	0	0	0	0	0	7	0	0
4	7	(England)	RB	Callum Brittain	7	0	0	0	0	0	0	0	0	7	0	0
6	10	(England)	CM	Josh Benson	5	0	0	0	0	0	1	0	0	6	0	0
6	14	(England)	CF	Carlton Morris	5	0	0	1	0	0	0	0	0	6	0	0
8	33	(England)	CM	Matty Wolfe	5	0	0	0	0	0	0	0	0	5	0	0
9	4	(Hungary)	LM	Callum Styles	3	0	0	1	0	0	0	0	0	4	0	0
9	15	(England)	CB	Jasper Moon	2	0	0	1	0	0	1	0	0	4	0	0
9	28	(Portugal)	CM	Domingos Quina	4	0	0	0	0	0	0	0	0	4	0	0
9	40	(England)	GK	Brad Collins	4	0	0	0	0	0	0	0	0	4	0	0
13	9	(England)	CF	Cauley Woodrow	3	0	0	0	0	0	0	0	0	3	0	0
14	17	(France)	DM	Claudio Gomes	2	0	0	0	0	0	0	0	0	2	0	0
14	29	(Nigeria)	CF	Victor Adeboyejo	2	0	0	0	0	0	0	0	0	2	0	0
16	2	(England)	RB	Jordan Williams	1	0	0	0	0	0	0	0	0	1	0	0
16	8	(England)	CM	Herbie Kane	0	0	0	0	0	0	1	0	0	1	0	0
16	11	(Belgium)	CF	Aaron Leya Iseka	1	0	0	0	0	0	0	0	0	1	0	0
16	20	(England)	RB	Toby Sibbick	1	0	0	0	0	0	0	0	0	1	0	0
16	23	(Republic of Ireland)	CM	William Hondermarck	1	0	0	0	0	0	0	0	0	1	0	0
16	26	(France)	LB	Rémy Vita	1	0	0	0	0	0	0	0	0	1	0	0
16	~~28~~	(Austria)	RW	Dominik Frieser	1	0	0	0	0	0	0	0	0	1	0	0
16	58	(Belgium)	CF	Obbi Oularé	1	0	0	0	0	0	0	0	0	1	0	0
Total					76	0	0	5	0	0	3	0	0	84	0	0

== Transfers ==
=== Transfers in ===
Date	Position	Nationality	Name	From	Fee	Ref.
1 July 2021	CF	(England)	David Bremang	(England) Coventry City	Free transfer	
1 July 2021	CF	(England)	Devante Cole	(Scotland) Motherwell	Free transfer	
1 July 2021	GK	(Nigeria)	Daniel Jinadu	(England) West Ham United	Free transfer	
1 July 2021	CB	(England)	Jason Sraha	(England) Arsenal	Free transfer	
21 July 2021	AM	(Lithuania)	Tomas Kalinauskas	(England) Farnborough	Free transfer	
26 July 2021	CF	(Belgium)	Obbi Oularé	(Belgium) Standard Liège	Undisclosed	
29 July 2021	CM	(England)	Josh Benson	(England) Burnley	Undisclosed	
2 August 2021	CF	(Belgium)	Aaron Leya Iseka	(France) Toulouse	Undisclosed	
10 September 2021	CM	(Republic of Ireland)	William Hondermarck	(England) Norwich City	Free transfer	

=== Loans in ===
Date from	Position	Nationality	Name	From	Date until	Ref.
31 August 2021	DM	(France)	Claudio Gomes	(England) Manchester City	End of season	
2 September 2021	LB	(France)	Rémy Vita	(Germany) Bayern Munich	End of season	
31 January 2022	AM	(Morocco)	Amine Bassi	(France) Metz	End of season	
1 February 2022	CM	(Portugal)	Domingos Quina	(England) Watford	End of season	

=== Loans out ===
Date from	Position	Nationality	Name	To	Date until	Ref.
1 July 2021	CF	(Austria)	Patrick Schmidt	(Denmark) Esbjerg	End of season	
2 July 2021	CF	(Scotland)	Jack Aitchison	(England) Forest Green Rovers	End of season	
10 July 2021	RW	(England)	Luke Thomas	(England) Bristol Rovers	End of season	
11 July 2021	CB	(England)	Jordan Helliwell	(Denmark) Esbjerg	31 December 2021	
11 July 2021	CF	(Canada)	Steve Simpson	(Denmark) Esbjerg	8 September 2021 (Note: Steve joined Esbjerg on a permanent basis.)	
11 July 2021	LB	(England)	Charlie Winfield	(Denmark) Esbjerg	31 December 2021	
11 July 2021	CM	(England)	Matty Wolfe	(Denmark) Esbjerg	31 December 2021	
6 August 2021	CB	(England)	Rudi Pache	(Denmark) Esbjerg	8 September 2021 (Note: Rudi joined Esbjerg on a permanent basis.)	
30 August 2021	CM	(England)	Herbie Kane	(England) Oxford United	End of season	
31 August 2021	CF	(England)	George Miller	(England) Walsall	End of season	
14 January 2022	AM	(Lithuania)	Tomas Kalinauskas	(England) AFC Wimbledon	End of season	
5 February 2022	CF	(England)	David Bremang	(England) Guiseley		
5 February 2022	CB	(England)	Jason Sraha	(England) Guiseley		
25 February 2022	DM	(England)	Joe Ackroyd	(Czech Republic) MFK Vyškov	End of season	
4 March 2022	CF	(England)	Cameron Thompson	(England) Darlington	End of season	

=== Transfers out ===
Date	Position	Nationality	Name	To	Fee	Ref.
30 June 2021	GK	(England)	Corey Addai	(Denmark) Esbjerg	Released	
30 June 2021	AM	(England)	Brad Binns		Released	
30 June 2021	CM	(England)	Jack Birks	(England) Parkgate	Released	
30 June 2021	RM	(Scotland)	Daniel Bramall	(Northern Ireland) Ballymena United	Released	
30 June 2021	RB	(England)	Will Calligan		Released	
30 June 2021	GK	(England)	Henry Kendrick		Released	
30 June 2021	CM	(England)	Alex Mowatt	(England) West Bromwich Albion	Rejected contract	
30 June 2021	CB	(England)	Sam Nicholson		Released	
30 June 2021	CB	(England)	Ali Omar	(England) Torquay United	Released	
30 June 2021	CF	(England)	Newton Sila-Conde		Released	
30 June 2021	GK	(England)	Harry Widdop		Released	
7 July 2021	CB	(Austria)	Michael Sollbauer	(Germany) Dynamo Dresden	Undisclosed	
27 July 2021	CF	(England)	Conor Chaplin	(England) Ipswich Town	Undisclosed	
5 August 2021	CM	(Austria)	Marcel Ritzmaier	(Germany) Sandhausen	Mutual consent	
6 August 2021	AM	(Angola)	Elliot Simões	(France) Nancy	Undisclosed	
8 September 2021	CB	(England)	Rudi Pache	(Denmark) Esbjerg	Undisclosed	
8 September 2021	CF	(Canada)	Steve Simpson	(Denmark) Esbjerg	Undisclosed	
21 December 2021	RW	(Austria)	Dominik Frieser	Free agent	Mutual consent	
5 January 2022	LB	(Wales)	Ben Williams	(England) Cheltenham Town	Undisclosed	
27 January 2022	CB	(England)	Toby Sibbick	(Scotland) Heart of Midlothian	Undisclosed	
