= Bradley Collins =

English footballer

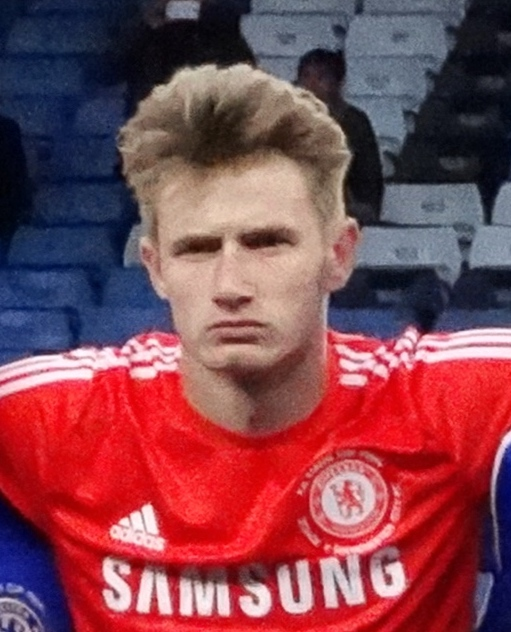
- Collins with Chelsea U18 in 2015

Personal information
- Full name: Bradley Ray Collins
- Date of birth: 18 February 1997 (age 29)
- Place of birth: Southampton, England
- Height: 1.84 m (6 ft 0 in)
- Position: Goalkeeper

Team information
- Current team: Bristol City
- Number: 40

Youth career
- 2010–2017: Chelsea

Senior career*
Years	Team	Apps	(Gls)
2017–2019	Chelsea	0	(0)
2017–2018	→ Forest Green Rovers (loan)	39	(0)
2018–2019	→ Burton Albion (loan)	31	(0)
2019–2023	Barnsley	107	(0)
2023–2026	Coventry City	43	(0)
2025–2026	→ Burton Albion (loan)	40	(0)
2026–	Bristol City	5	(0)
- * Club domestic league appearances and goals as of 09:18, 22 November 2026 (UTC)

Bradley Ray Collins (born 18 February 1997) is an English professional footballer who plays as a goalkeeper for EFL Championship club Bristol City.

== Career ==
=== Chelsea ===
Born in Southampton, Collins joined Chelsea in 2010 at under-12 level, and signed a scholarship in the summer of 2013. He turned professional in 2014. He was the under-18 first-choice goalkeeper for the 2014–15 season, winning the UEFA Youth League and FA Youth Cup. He was the under-19 and under-21 first-choice for the 2015–16 season. In July 2016 he signed a new contract with the club, until June 2018. In July 2017 he signed a season-long loan deal with League Two club Forest Green Rovers. He made his senior professional debut on 5 August 2017, in a league game against Barnet which ended in a 2–2 draw. On 12 September 2017, Collins was accused of spitting at Sean Raggett in a 1–0 defeat to Lincoln City.

On 31 August 2018, Collins joined League One side Burton Albion on loan until January 2019. In December 2018, after 10 appearances, he stated he wished to extend his stay, and in January 2019 the loan was extended until the end of the season.

=== Barnsley ===
On 19 June 2019, Collins joined Championship side Barnsley on a four-year deal with an option for a further year at the end of his deal.

=== Coventry City ===
On 17 July 2023, Collins signed for Championship side Coventry City for an undisclosed fee on a three-year contract. He returned on loan to Burton Albion in August 2025.

He was released upon the expiry of his contract at the end of the 2025–26 season.

=== Bristol City ===
On 10 July 2026, Collins signed for Championship side Bristol City on a two-year contract.

== Career statistics ==
As of match played on 21 November 2026

Appearances and goals by club, season and competition
Club	Season	League			FA Cup		League Cup		Other		Total	
Club	Season	Division	Apps	Goals	Apps	Goals	Apps	Goals	Apps	Goals	Apps	Goals
Chelsea U21s	2016–17 EFL Trophy		—		—		—		3 (Note: Appearance(s) in the EFL Trophy.)	0	3	0
Chelsea	2017–18	Premier League	0	0	0	0	0	0	0	0	0	0
Chelsea	2018–19	Premier League	0	0	0	0	0	0	0	0	0	0
Chelsea	Total		0	0	0	0	0	0	0	0	0	0
Forest Green Rovers (loan)	2017–18	League Two	39	0	3	0	0	0	3	0	45	0
Burton Albion (loan)	2018–19	League One	31	0	1	0	3	0	0	0	35	0
Barnsley	2019–20	Championship	19	0	2	0	1	0	0	0	22	0
Barnsley	2020–21	Championship	22	0	3	0	2	0	2 (Note: Appearances in the Play-Offs.)	0	29	0
Barnsley	2021–22	Championship	40	0	0	0	0	0	0	0	40	0
Barnsley	2022–23	League One	26	0	0	0	0	0	0	0	26	0
Barnsley	Total		107	0	5	0	3	0	2	0	117	0
Coventry City	2023–24	Championship	28	0	2	0	1	0	0	0	31	0
Coventry City	2024–25	Championship	15	0	0	0	0	0	0	0	15	0
Coventry City	2025–26	Championship	0	0	0	0	0	0	0	0	0	0
Coventry City	Total		43	0	2	0	1	0	0	0	46	0
Burton Albion (loan)	2025–26	League One	40	0	2	0	0	0	0	0	42	0
Bristol City	2026–27	Championship	5	0	0	0	0	0	0	0	5	0
Career total			265	0	13	0	7	0	8	0	293	0

== Honours ==
Individual

- Barnsley Player of the Year: 2021–22
