= Jack Butterfill =

English footballer (born 2003)

Personal information
- Date of birth: 12 September 2003 (age 23)
- Position: Forward

Team information
- Current team: Barnsley
- Number: 36

Youth career
- Leicester City

Senior career*
Years	Team	Apps	(Gls)
2022–2023	Barnsley	0	(0)
2023–	Lincoln United	0	(0)
- * Club domestic league appearances and goals as of 00:00, 11 October 2022 (UTC)

Jack Butterfill (born 12 September 2003) is an English professional footballer who plays as a forward for EFL League One club Barnsley.

== Career ==
Butterfill came through the Leicester City Academy and joined Barnsley in the summer of 2022. He scored on his first-team debut on 20 September 2022, coming on for Fabio Jalo as a substitute 70 minutes into a 2–0 win over Newcastle United U21 in an EFL Trophy group stage game at Oakwell. He said that "it's my biggest moment. It was in front of a crowd as well, it was great".

== Career statistics ==
As of match played 11 October 2022

Appearances and goals by club, season and competition
Club	Season	League			FA Cup		EFL Cup		Other		Total	
Club	Season	Division	Apps	Goals	Apps	Goals	Apps	Goals	Apps	Goals	Apps	Goals
Barnsley	2022–23	EFL League One	0	0	0	0	0	0	2 (Note: Appearance(s) in the EFL Trophy)	1	2	1
Career total			0	0	0	0	0	0	2	1	2	1
