= Will Hondermarck =

Congolese footballer (born 2000)

William Hondermarck
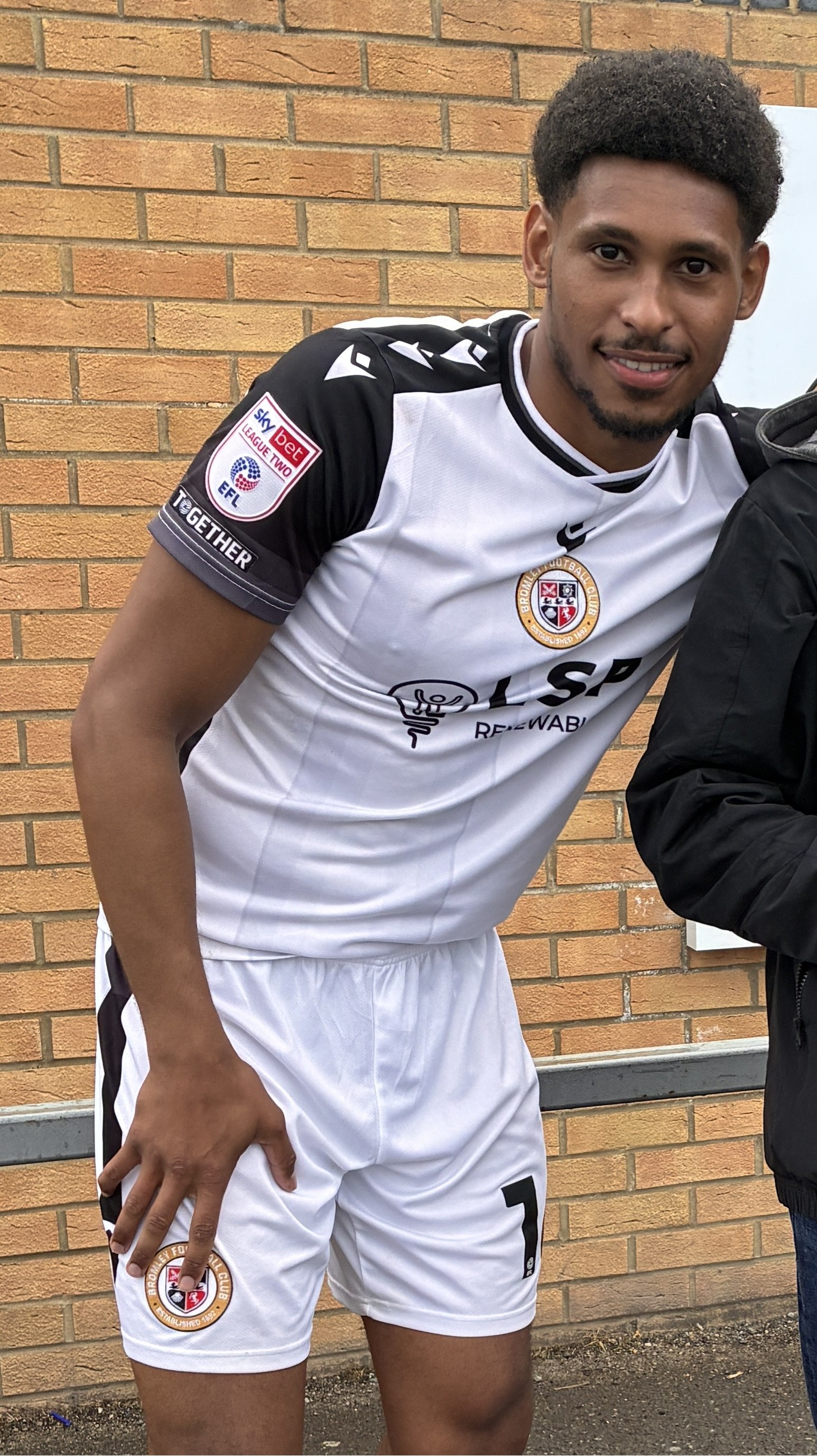
- Hondermarck in 2026

Personal information
- Full name: William Mbongo Desire Hondermarck
- Date of birth: 21 November 2000 (age 25)
- Place of birth: Orléans, France
- Height: 1.85 m (6 ft 1 in)
- Position: Midfielder

Team information
- Current team: Bromley
- Number: 16

Senior career*
| Years | Team | Apps | (Gls) |
| 2018–2019 | Drogheda United | 14 | (0) |
| 2019–2021 | Norwich City | 0 | (0) |
| 2021 | → Harrogate Town (loan) | 3 | (0) |
| 2021–2023 | Barnsley | 17 | (0) |
| 2023–2025 | Northampton Town | 80 | (2) |
| 2025– | Bromley | 47 | (4) |

International career^{‡}
| 2024– | Congo | 2 | (0) |
- * Club domestic league appearances and goals as of 11:49, 25 September 2026 (UTC) ‡ National team caps and goals as of 30 September 2026

William Mbongo Desire Hondermarck (born 21 November 2000) is a professional footballer who plays as a midfielder for EFL League One club Bromley. Born in France, he plays for the Congo national football team.

== Early life ==
Will Hondermarck was born in Orléans, France in 2000, but his family moved to Dublin in 2005 due to work commitments. He attended St. Fintan's High School in Dublin. His father is a German-born Frenchman, and his mother is French of Congolese descent. Due to his upbringing in Ireland, he holds an Irish passport since 2019, making him eligible to play for the Republic of Ireland which he stated in 2021 he was keen to do.

== Career ==
=== Early career ===
Having made 14 appearances for Drogheda United during the 2018 season, he joined Norwich City in January 2019. He joined League Two club Harrogate Town on loan until the end of the season in January 2021. He made his debut for the club on 9 January 2021 as a substitute in a 2–1 defeat to Cambridge United. He made his first start for the club on 30 April 2021 in a 5–4 win over Cambridge United. He made 3 appearances in total during his loan spell at Harrogate Town, and was released by Norwich at the end of the season.

=== Barnsley ===
After a trial spell with Notts County in summer 2021, he signed for EFL Championship club Barnsley in September 2021.

In summer 2022, Hondermarck signed a new two-year contract with Barnsley.

=== Northampton Town ===
In January 2023, Hondermarck signed for League Two club Northampton Town on a two-and-a-half-year contract. He scored his first goal for the club in February 2023, against Gillingham F.C, a goal that was nominated for Goal of the Season in 2022/23 season the Northampton

Hondermarck was part of the team that secured promotion to League 1 at the end of the 2022/23 season.

On 6 May 2025, the club announced the player would leave in June when his contract expired after three seasons and 88 appearances for the club.

=== Bromley ===
On 27 June 2025, Bromley announced they had signed Hondermarck. On his home debut for the club, he claimed his first assist and player of the match award for the club Bromley finished the season as 2025-26 EFL League Two champions, securing the winner's trophy on the final day with a 3–1 win over Walsall F.C.. Hondermarck finished the season with 4 goals and 4 assists, his highest amount of goal contributions to date. Which included a brace against Grimsby Town F.C. on 20 December 2025. This was the second promotion and first champions medal of Hondermarck's career.

== International career ==
On 8 November 2021, Hondermarck was called up to the Republic of Ireland U21 squad for the first time for their 2023 UEFA European Under-21 Championship qualifiers against Italy and Sweden as a replacement for the injured Ryan Johansson. On 9 June 2023, he was called up to the Congo senior squad for an upcoming Africa Cup of Nations qualifier against Mali. He is eligible to represent Congo through his mother, who is of Congolese descent.

Hondermarck made his debut for Congo on 11 June 2024 in a World Cup qualifier against Morocco at the Adrar Stadium. He substituted Silvère Ganvoula in the 78th minute, as Morocco won 6–0.

Congo were suspended by FIFA in 2025 due to "third-party interference" in FECOFOOT - Congolese football's governing body, which lasted for 18 months. Hondermarck was part of their first squad back in competitive action, notably playing against African giants Cameroon and holding them to a 1–1 draw on 29 September 2026.

== Career statistics ==
As of 2 May 2026

Appearances and goals by club, season and competition
| Club | Season | League | | | National Cup | | League Cup | | Other | | Total | |
| Club | Season | Division | Apps | Goals | Apps | Goals | Apps | Goals | Apps | Goals | Apps | Goals |
|---|---|---|---|---|---|---|---|---|---|---|---|---|
| Drogheda United | 2018 | LOI First Division | 14 | 0 | 0 | 0 | 1 | 1 | 0 | 0 | 15 | 1 |
| Norwich City U21 | 2019–20 | — | | | — | | — | | 3 (Note: Appearance(s) in EFL Trophy) | 0 | 3 | 0 |
| Norwich City U21 | 2020–21 | — | | | — | | — | | 4 | 1 | 4 | 1 |
| Norwich City U21 | Total | | — | | — | | — | | 7 | 1 | 7 | 1 |
| Harrogate Town (loan) | 2020–21 | League Two | 3 | 0 | 0 | 0 | 0 | 0 | 0 | 0 | 3 | 0 |
| Barnsley | 2021–22 | Championship | 9 | 0 | 1 | 0 | 0 | 0 | — | | 10 | 0 |
| Barnsley | 2022–23 | League One | 2 | 0 | 1 | 0 | 2 | 0 | 2 | 0 | 7 | 0 |
| Barnsley | Total | | 11 | 0 | 2 | 0 | 2 | 0 | 2 | 0 | 17 | 0 |
| Northampton Town | 2022–23 | League Two | 17 | 1 | 0 | 0 | 0 | 0 | 0 | 0 | 17 | 1 |
| Northampton Town | 2023–24 | League One | 29 | 1 | 1 | 0 | 1 | 0 | 1 | 0 | 32 | 1 |
| Northampton Town | 2024–25 | League One | 33 | 0 | 1 | 0 | 1 | 0 | 4 | 0 | 39 | 0 |
| Northampton Town | Total | | 80 | 2 | 2 | 0 | 2 | 0 | 5 | 0 | 88 | 2 |
| Bromley | 2025–26 | League Two | 41 | 4 | 1 | 0 | 2 | 0 | 2 | 0 | 46 | 4 |
| Career total | | | 149 | 6 | 5 | 0 | 7 | 1 | 16 | 1 | 169 | 8 |

== Honours ==
Northampton Town

- EFL League Two promotion: 2022–23

Bromley

- EFL League Two: 2025–26
