= Jack Walton (footballer) =

English footballer (born 1998)

- Walton with Dundee United in 2026

Personal information
- Full name: Jack James Walton
- Date of birth: 23 April 1998 (age 28)
- Place of birth: Bury, England
- Height: 6 ft 2 in (1.89 m)
- Position: Goalkeeper

Team information
- Current team: Dundee United
- Number: 1

Youth career
- Bury
- Bolton Wanderers
- 2013–2015: Barnsley

Senior career*
Years	Team	Apps	(Gls)
2015–2023	Barnsley	47	(0)
2016	→ Stalybridge Celtic (loan)	1	(0)
2017–2018	→ Stalybridge Celtic (loan)	18	(0)
2023–2025	Luton Town	0	(0)
2023–2025	→ Dundee United (loan)	72	(0)
2025–2026	Preston North End	3	(0)
2026	→ Cambridge United (loan)	1	(0)
2026-	Dundee United	11	(0)
- * Club domestic league appearances and goals as of 14:27, 3 November 2026 (UTC)

Jack James Walton (born 23 April 1998) is an English professional footballer who plays as a goalkeeper for Scottish Premiership club Dundee United.

== Club career ==
Walton started his youth career with Bolton Wanderers' Academy before switching to Barnsley in 2013, where he was named Academy Player of the year for 2014–15. In August 2015, he signed his first professional contract with the club, of three years.

On 25 January 2016, Walton was loaned out to Conference North club Stalybridge Celtic on a 28-day youth loan. He made his debut the same day in a goalless draw with Curzon Ashton.

Walton returned to Stalybridge Celtic on 22 September 2017 for one month, during which he played eight times and kept three clean sheets. Upon returning to his parent club, he said "I really enjoyed my time with Stalybridge and I can't thank them enough for taking the chance on me to play for them". In January 2018, he was reloaned to Stalybridge Celtic for the remainder of the season, but was recalled in March and was named on the bench for a Championship match at home to Millwall. He made a brief return to Stalybridge before, on 24 April 2018, making his debut for Barnsley in a 3–0 league defeat against Nottingham Forest. He went on to play twice more during the season, and kept a clean sheet in a 2–0 victory over Brentford.

On 2 July 2018, Walton signed a two-year contract extension with Barnsley. On 13 August 2020, Walton signed a new three-year contract extension with Barnsley.

On 30 January 2023, after making just one league appearance all season, Walton moved up a division by signing for Luton Town for an undisclosed fee. Luton goalkeeper Harry Isted moved in the opposite direction on loan for the rest of the season on the same day. Luton's season culminated in promotion to the Premier League, but Walton failed to make an appearance. He left on loan prior to the season starting.

On 10 July 2023, it was announced that Walton had signed for Scottish Championship side Dundee United on loan until the end of the season. On 26 June 2024, having enjoyed a successful spell, which saw United promoted to the Scottish Premiership, Walton returned to Tannadice on another season-long loan deal.

On 22 July 2025, Walton joined Championship club Preston North End on a three-year deal for an undisclosed fee. On 15 April 2026, he joined Cambridge United on a seven-day emergency loan.

== Career statistics ==
As of match played 16 April 2026

Appearances and goals by club, season and competition
Club	Season	League			National cup (Note: Includes FA Cup, Scottish Cup)		League cup (Note: Includes EFL Cup, Scottish League Cup)		Other		Total	
Club	Season	Division	Apps	Goals	Apps	Goals	Apps	Goals	Apps	Goals	Apps	Goals
Barnsley	2015–16	League One	0	0	0	0	0	0	0	0	0	0
Barnsley	2016–17	Championship	0	0	0	0	0	0	—		0	0
Barnsley	2017–18	Championship	3	0	0	0	0	0	—		3	0
Barnsley	2018–19	League One	3	0	0	0	1	0	2 (Note: Appearances in EFL Trophy)	0	6	0
Barnsley	2019–20	Championship	9	0	0	0	0	0	—		9	0
Barnsley	2020–21	Championship	24	0	0	0	1	0	—		25	0
Barnsley	2021–22	Championship	7	0	2	0	1	0	—		10	0
Barnsley	2022–23	League One	1	0	3	0	2	0	3	0	9	0
Barnsley	Total		47	0	5	0	5	0	5	0	62	0
Stalybridge Celtic (loan)	2015–16	National League North	1	0	—		—		—		1	0
Stalybridge Celtic (loan)	2017–18	Northern Premier League	18	0	—		—		1 (Note: Appearance in Cheshire Senior Cup)	0	19	0
Stalybridge Celtic (loan)	Total		19	0	—		—		1	0	20	0
Luton Town	2023–24	Premier League	0	0	0	0	0	0	—		0	0
Luton Town	2024–25	Championship	0	0	0	0	0	0	—		0	0
Luton Town	Total		0	0	0	0	0	0	0	0	0	0
Dundee United (loan)	2023–24	Scottish Championship	36	0	1	0	4	0	3 (Note: Appearance(s) in Scottish League Challenge Cup)	0	44	0
Dundee United (loan)	2024–25	Scottish Premiership	36	0	1	0	4	0	—		41	0
Dundee United (loan)	Total		72	0	2	0	8	0	3	0	85	0
Preston North End	2025–26	Championship	3	0	0	0	2	0	—		5	0
Cambridge United (loan)	2025–26	League Two	1	0	—		—		—		1	0
Career total			142	0	6	0	11	0	9	0	173	0

== Style of play ==
Former Barnsley manager Lee Johnson described Walton as a player who is technically good and has good character.
