= Jordan Williams (footballer, born 1999) =

English footballer

Personal information
- Full name: Jordan Lee Williams
- Date of birth: 22 October 1999 (age 27)
- Place of birth: Huddersfield, England
- Height: 5 ft 10 in (1.79 m)
- Position: Right back

Team information
- Current team: Blackpool (on loan from Portsmouth)
- Number: 28

Youth career
- 2008–2017: Huddersfield Town

Senior career*
Years	Team	Apps	(Gls)
2017–2018	Huddersfield Town	0	(0)
2017–2018	→ Bury (loan)	9	(0)
2018–2024	Barnsley	172	(6)
2024–	Portsmouth	50	(1)
2026–	→ Blackpool (loan)	0	(0)

International career^{‡}
2015	England U17	6	(1)
2016	England U18	2	(0)
- * Club domestic league appearances and goals as of 29 July 2026 ‡ National team caps and goals as of 21:09, 3 December 2020 (UTC)

Jordan Lee Williams (born 22 October 1999) is an English professional footballer who plays as a right back for EFL League One club Blackpool, on loan from EFL Championship club Portsmouth.

A product of the Huddersfield Town Academy, he was loaned out to Bury in August 2017, just 2 days after making his debut in the League Cup against Rotherham United.

== Career ==
Brought up in Huddersfield, Williams joined Huddersfield Town aged 9, and gradually went up the ranks, including winning two England under-18 caps.

He made his competitive first team debut for the Terriers in their EFL Cup second round match against Rotherham United at the John Smith's Stadium on 23 August 2017.

After head coach David Wagner said he expected Williams to go out on loan to gain experience, he joined EFL League One side Bury on loan for the rest of the season on 25 August 2017. He made his debut for the Shakers the following day in their 0–0 draw against Rochdale.

On 8 August 2018, Williams joined League One club Barnsley for an undisclosed fee, signing a four-year deal. He scored his first goal for Barnsley, and his first career goal, in an EFL Trophy tie against Manchester City Under-23s on 4 December 2018.

On 17 May 2024, the club announced he would be released in the summer when his contract expired.

On 14 June 2024, Williams signed for EFL Championship club Portsmouth as a free agent.

On 29 July 2026, Williams joined League One club Blackpool on a season-long loan.

== Career statistics ==
As of match played 2 May 2026

Appearances and goals by club, season and competition
Club	Season	League			FA Cup		League Cup		Other		Total	
Club	Season	Division	Apps	Goals	Apps	Goals	Apps	Goals	Apps	Goals	Apps	Goals
Huddersfield Town	2017–18	Premier League	0	0	0	0	1	0	—		1	0
Bury (loan)	2017–18	League One	9	0	1	0	—		4 (Note: Appearances in EFL Trophy)	0	14	0
Barnsley	2018–19	League One	11	0	0	0	0	0	4	1	15	1
Barnsley	2019–20	Championship	30	0	2	0	1	0	—		33	0
Barnsley	2020–21	Championship	21	0	2	0	3	1	2 (Note: Two appearances in EFL Championship play-offs)	0	28	1
Barnsley	2021–22]	Championship	21	0	2	1	1	0	—		24	1
Barnsley	2022–23	League One	43	5	2	0	1	0	3 (Note: Three appearances in EFL League One play-offs)	0	49	5
Barnsley	2023–24	League One	46	1	2	0	1	0	3 (Note: One appearance in EFL Trophy, two appearances in EFL League One play-offs)	0	52	1
Barnsley	Total		172	6	10	1	7	1	12	1	201	9
Portsmouth	2024–25	Championship	20	0	1	0	1	0	—		22	0
Portsmouth	2025–26	Championship	30	1	1	0	0	0	—		31	1
Portsmouth	2026–27	Championship	0	0	0	0	0	0	—		0	0
Portsmouth	Total		50	1	2	0	1	0	—		53	1
Blackpool (loan)	2026–27	League One	1	0	0	0	0	0	0	0	1	0
Career total			232	7	13	1	9	1	16	1	270	10

== Honours ==
=== Club ===
Barnsley

- EFL League One runner-up: 2018–19
