= Romal Palmer =

English footballer (born 1998)

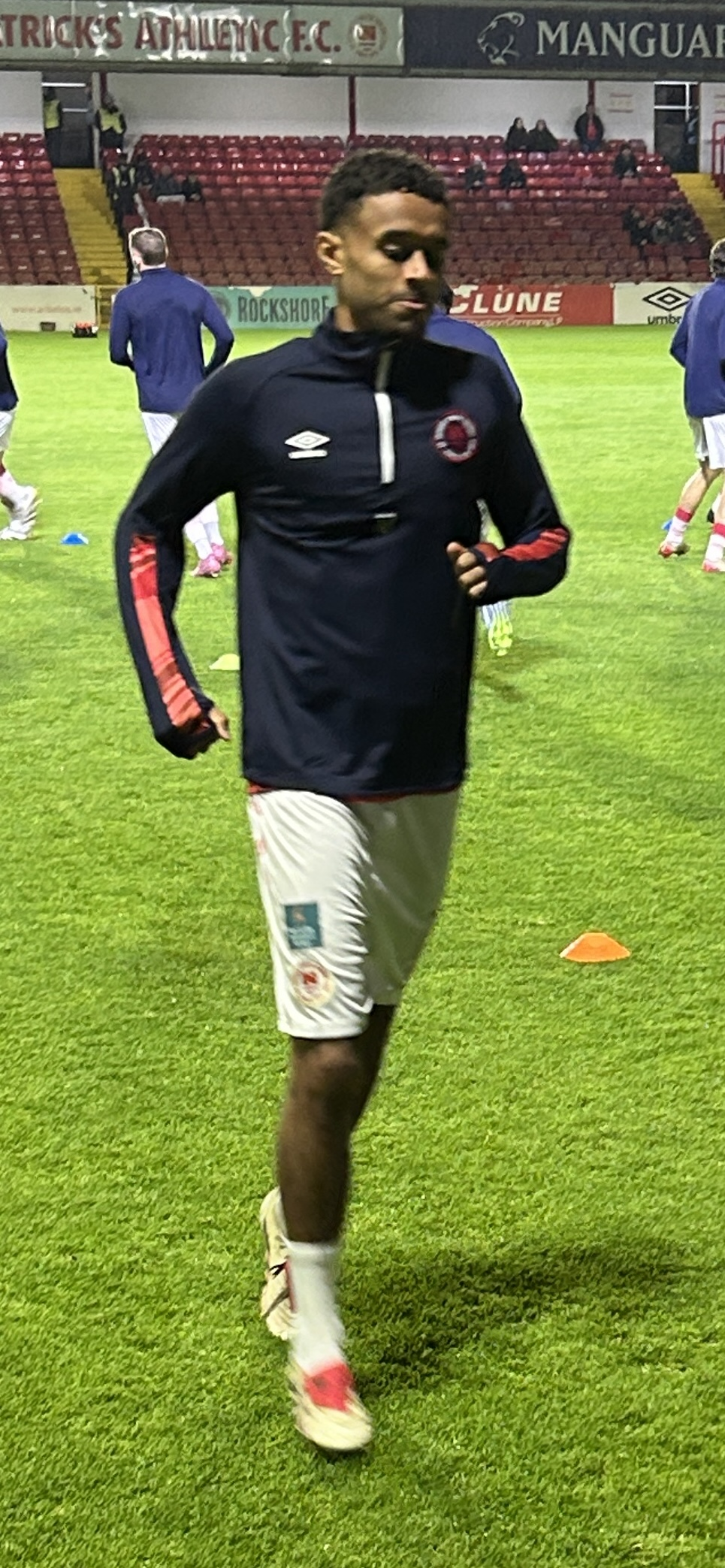
- Romal Palmer during a pre-match warmup with St Patrick's Athletic in 2025

Personal information
- Full name: Romal Jordan Palmer
- Date of birth: 30 September 1998 (age 28)
- Place of birth: Wigan, England
- Height: 5 ft 11 in (1.81 m)
- Position: Midfielder

Team information
- Current team: St Patrick's Athletic
- Number: 17

Youth career
- –2016: Manchester City
- 2016–2018: Barnsley

Senior career*
Years	Team	Apps	(Gls)
2018–2022	Barnsley	70	(2)
2018–2019	→ Darlington (loan)	18	(0)
2022–2024	Göztepe	33	(3)
2024	→ St Patrick's Athletic (loan)	19	(1)
2025–	St Patrick's Athletic	29	(3)
- * Club domestic league appearances and goals as of 23:36, 30 October 2026 (UTC)

Romal Jordan Palmer (born 30 September 1998) is an English professional footballer who plays as a midfielder for League of Ireland Premier Division club St Patrick's Athletic.

== Early life ==
Palmer was born and raised in Wigan, Greater Manchester.

== Career ==
=== Barnsley ===
After a decade with Manchester City's academy, he was released in 2016, and joined Barnsley. He signed an 18-month professional contract with Barnsley in January 2017. In July 2018, he signed a one-year contract extension with Barnsley. On 21 December 2018, Palmer joined National League North club Darlington on a one-month loan. On 23 January 2019, Palmer's loan at Darlington was extended until the end of the seasons. He made 18 appearances on loan at Darlington. In May 2019, Palmer signed a new contract with Barnsley until summer 2020.

In May 2020, Barnsley announced that Palmer had signed a new two-year contract with the club. Palmer made his debut for Barnsley on 20 June 2020 against Queens Park Rangers in the EFL Championship. He made 3 league appearances during the 2019–20 season. Palmer made a first-team breakthrough during the 2020–21 season, making 36 league appearances. He scored his first goal for Barnsley in a 2–1 defeat to Blackburn Rovers on 28 November 2020. Despite starting his career as an attacking midfielder, Palmer was used mainly as a holding midfielder during the 2020–21 season as Barnsley finished 5th in the Championship, qualifying for the play-offs. He played in both legs of their play-off semi-final defeat to Swansea City.

Barnsley manager Valerien Ismael and Palmer's midfield partner Alex Mowatt both left the club in summer 2021, leaving Palmer as the oldest midfielder in Barnsley's squad. He made 33 appearances for Barnsley during the 2021–22 season, scoring once against Millwall, in what the Barnsley Chronicle described as a "very tough campaign" for Palmer. Barnsley were relegated to EFL League One after a 24th-place finish in the Championship.

=== Göztepe ===
On 1 July 2022, Palmer joined TFF First League club Göztepe after seven years at Barnsley. On 14 November 2022, he scored his first goal for the club, a 77th minute winner at home to Ankara Keçiörengücü at the Gürsel Aksel Stadium. Palmer scored 3 goals in 34 appearances in all competitions during his time with the club.

=== St Patrick's Athletic ===
==== 2024 loan season ====
On 10 February 2024, Palmer signed for League of Ireland Premier Division club St Patrick's Athletic on a season-long loan. He made his debut for the club on 29 March as a substitute in an away match against Drogheda United. His first start came on 24 May 2024 under newly appointed former Republic of Ireland manager Stephen Kenny, in a 2–2 draw away to Bohemians in which Palmer won the penalty for his side's first goal, before assisting the second goal. On 25 July 2024, Palmer made his first European appearance of his career, assisting Jake Mulraney's second goal in a 3–1 win over Vaduz of Liechtenstein in the UEFA Conference League. He scored his first goal for the club in the away leg against Vaduz, scoring an 81st minute equaliser to secure a 2–2 draw at the Rheinpark Stadion, earning a third qualifying round tie with Sabah of Azerbaijan. On 8 August 2024, Palmer scored the only goal of the game to secure a 1–0 win in the first leg against Sabah at Tallaght Stadium. On 22 August 2024, he was substituted off in the first half of his sides 0–0 draw with İstanbul Başakşehir in the UEFA Conference League due to a Medial collateral ligament injury that would keep him out of action for eight weeks, including the following week's second leg. On 1 November 2024, Palmer scored in the 90th minute of a 2–0 win over Sligo Rovers as his side won a record equaling 9 league games in a row to secure 3rd position in the table and UEFA Conference League football for the following season.

==== 2025 season ====
On 2 December 2024, Palmer signed for the club on a permanent basis, on a two-year contract. After four appearances into the season, Palmer had to undergo surgery on a hamstring injury in March 2025, with the recovery period set to keep him out of action for several months. On 22 May 2025, manager Stephen Kenny revealed that Palmer had almost finished his recovery and rehabilitation period when he suffered a setback that would require another surgery on his hamstring. On 10 October 2025, he made his long awaited return from injury after 10 months out, coming off the bench in a 4–0 win over St Mochta's in the Leinster Senior Cup, helping earn his side a place in the final.

==== 2026 season ====
On 27 February 2026, Palmer opened the scoring in a 4–0 win over Dundalk in what was his first start in 364 days, having recovered from an injury hit 2025 season. On 13 March 2026, Palmer scored the final goal of the game in a 4–1 win at home to Drogheda United. On 3 April 2026, he scored a headed equaliser in an eventual 4–1 win over Sligo Rovers at Richmond Park.

== Career statistics ==
As of match played 30 October 2026

Appearances and goals by club, season and competition
Club	Season	League			National cup (Note: Includes FA Cup, Turkish Cup & FAI Cup)		League cup (Note: Includes EFL Cup)		Europe		Other		Total	
Club	Season	Division	Apps	Goals	Apps	Goals	Apps	Goals	Apps	Goals	Apps	Goals	Apps	Goals
Barnsley	2019–20	Championship	3	0	0	0	0	0	–		–		3	0
Barnsley	2020–21	Championship	34	1	3	0	0	0	–		2 (Note: Appearances in 2021 EFL Championship Play-offs)	0	39	1
Barnsley	2021–22	Championship	33	1	2	0	0	0	–		–		35	1
Barnsley	Total		70	2	5	0	0	0	–		2	0	77	2
Darlington (loan)	2018–19	National League North	18	0	0	0	–		–		–		18	0
Göztepe	2022–23	TFF First League	27	3	1	0	–		–		–		28	3
Göztepe	2023–24	TFF First League	6	0	0	0	–		–		–		6	0
Göztepe	2024–25	Süper Lig	0	0	0	0	–		–		–		0	0
Göztepe	Total		33	3	1	0	–		–		–		34	3
St Patrick's Athletic (loan)	2024	LOI Premier Division	19	1	1	0	–		5 (Note: Appearances in the UEFA Conference League)	2	0 (Note: Appearances in the Leinster Senior Cup)	0	25	3
St Patrick's Athletic	2025	LOI Premier Division	4	0	0	0	–		0	0	2	0	6	0
St Patrick's Athletic	2026	LOI Premier Division	25	3	1	0	—		—		0	0	26	3
St Patrick's Athletic	Total		29	3	1	0	–		0	0	2	0	32	3
Career total			169	9	8	0	0	0	5	2	4	0	186	11

== Honours ==
St Patrick's Athletic

- Leinster Senior Cup: 2023–24
