= Jasper Moon =

English footballer

Personal information
- Full name: Jasper Moon
- Date of birth: 24 November 2000 (age 25)
- Place of birth: Coventry, England
- Height: 1.86 m (6 ft 1 in)
- Position: Defender

Team information
- Current team: Port Vale
- Number: 4

Youth career
- 2008–2017: Leicester City
- 2017–2019: Barnsley

Senior career*
Years	Team	Apps	(Gls)
2019–2023	Barnsley	28	(0)
2019	→ York City (loan)	3	(0)
2023	→ Burton Albion (loan)	18	(0)
2023–2026	Burton Albion	49	(1)
2024–2025	→ Harrogate Town (loan)	40	(3)
2026–	Port Vale	8	(0)
- * Club domestic league appearances and goals as of 10:22, 22 November 2026 (UTC)

Jasper Moon (born 24 November 2000) is an English professional footballer who plays as a defender for EFL League Two club Port Vale.

Moon moved from the Leicester City to Barnsley youth system in 2017, gaining senior experience playing non-League football on loan at York City in March 2019. He played 34 first-team games for Barnsley before joining Burton Albion, initially on loan, in January 2023. After three-and-a-half seasons at Burton, during which he also spent time on loan at Harrogate Town, he signed with Port Vale in June 2026.

== Career ==
=== Barnsley ===
A youth product of Leicester City since the age of eight, Moon joined the youth academy of Barnsley after being released by Leicester in 2017. He had played for Leicester U-18s in the TRI-SERIES international youth tournament in Qatar in November 2016. On 28 March 2019, he joined National League North side York City on a one-month work experience loan. York were mid-table under the stewardship of Steve Watson, and Moon impressed on his debut, playing the full 90 minutes for the Minstermen in a 1–0 win over Southport at Bootham Crescent on 6 April. Local newspaper, The Press, reported that he "has potential for a good career in the game, especially if he grows a little taller".

He suffered a broken leg in the 2019–20 campaign and upon his recovery was played in central midfield by U-23 boss Martin Devaney, which eventually gave him an opportunity in the senior team when called up by manager Valérien Ismaël following an injury crisis in midfield. Moon made his Championship debut for Barnsley on 29 December 2020 in a 2–1 win at Rotherham United. He signed a new two-year deal in June 2021 after having impressed in his three central midfield performances throughout the 2020–21 campaign. Moon said: "I am over the moon."

He made a target of 15 appearances for the 2021–22 season and ended up playing 27 games, which Academy boss Bobby Hassell admitted was largely due to injuries within the squad at Oakwell. He was a regular under Markus Schopp, though barely featured under Poya Asbaghi after Mads Juel Andersen returned to fitness, spending three months out of the side following a costly mistake after coming on as a late substitute against hometown club Coventry City. He returned to play the final three matches under caretaker manager Martin Devaney. Barnsley were relegated, though Devaney said playing at League One level might benefit Moon. He featured four times in the first half of the 2022–23 season, all of his games coming in the EFL Trophy as new manager Michael Duff never selected him for League One fixtures.

=== Burton Albion ===
On 18 January 2023, Moon joined fellow League One club Burton Albion on loan until the end of the 2022–23 season. He was played on the left of a back three with John Brayford and Sam Hughes. He played 18 times for the Brewers and was a key reason they kept six clean sheets and avoided relegation. He moved to Burton Albion on a permanent basis on 18 July 2023, joining on a three-year deal for an undisclosed fee. He said that he fitted in well with manager Dino Maamria's style of play and had really enjoyed his loan spell. Martin Paterson replaced Maamria as head coach in January and Moon missed the opening two months of his tenure due to injury. He played 33 games across the 2023–24 campaign.

On 30 August 2024, Moon joined League Two club Harrogate Town on a season-long loan deal. Head of Player Recruitment for the Sulphurites, Lloyd Kerry, said that he was "mobile, aggressive, good in the air and is used to playing in a back three, so we think he can slot straight in". On 15 February, Moon scored his first goal in professional football to secure a 1–0 victory over Swindon Town at Wetherby Road. This earned him a place on the League Two Team of the Week. He scored three goals for the club and was named Players' Player of the Season, having formed a central defensive partnership with Anthony O'Connor. He played a total of 46 games for Harrogate, though manager Simon Weaver admitted that he would be unable to bring him back the following season as Burton boss Gary Bowyer made it clear he wanted Moon back in the squad.

Burton released him at the end of the 2025–26 campaign. He had scored his first and only goal for the club on the penultimate game of the season, securing the club's League One safety with the equaliser in a 1–1 draw with Exeter City at the Pirelli Stadium. Bowyer admitted that he "never, ever, ever" expected Moon to score such a vital goal, but that "he deserves an enormous amount of credit because he has had a torrid season with the injury that he has had".

=== Port Vale ===
On 12 June 2026, Moon agreed to join League Two club Port Vale on a free transfer, having previously worked with assistant manager Gary Mills at Burton. He missed the start of the 2026–27 season due to a groin issue. He made his first league start at Vale Park on 10 October, impressing in the middle of a back three as the Valiants defeated Grimsby Town by one goal to nil.

== Style of play ==
Moon is a "tough tackling and no-nonsense" defender. The Port Vale website stated that he is "known for his composure on the ball, aerial presence and versatility across the back line". His versatility led to him being played in central and defensive midfield at Barnsley, where he was described as a "utility player".

== Career statistics ==
As of match played 21 November 2026

Appearances and goals by club, season and competition
Club	Season	League			FA Cup		EFL Cup		Other		Total	
Club	Season	Division	Apps	Goals	Apps	Goals	Apps	Goals	Apps	Goals	Apps	Goals
Barnsley	2018–19	League One	0	0	0	0	0	0	0	0	0	0
Barnsley	2019–20	Championship	0	0	0	0	0	0	—		0	0
Barnsley	2020–21	Championship	3	0	0	0	0	0	—		3	0
Barnsley	2021–22	Championship	25	0	1	0	1	0	—		27	0
Barnsley	2022–23	League One	0	0	0	0	0	0	4 (Note: Appearance(s) in EFL Trophy)	0	4	0
Barnsley	Total		28	0	1	0	1	0	4	0	34	0
York City (loan)	2018–19	National League North	3	0	—		—		—		3	0
Burton Albion (loan)	2022–23	League One	18	0	—		—		—		18	0
Burton Albion	2023–24	League One	28	0	2	0	0	0	3	0	33	0
Burton Albion	2024–25	League One	0	0	0	0	0	0	0	0	0	0
Burton Albion	2025–26	League One	21	1	2	0	1	0	0	0	24	1
Burton Albion	Total		49	1	4	0	1	0	3	0	57	1
Harrogate Town (loan)	2024–25	League Two	40	3	3	0	—		3	0	46	3
Port Vale	2026–27	League Two	8	0	1	0	0	0	3	0	12	0
Career total			146	4	9	0	2	0	13	0	170	4
