= Matty Wolfe =

English footballer

Personal information
- Full name: Matthew Ryan Wolfe
- Date of birth: 12 June 2000 (age 26)
- Height: 1.91 m (6 ft 3 in)
- Position: Midfielder

Team information
- Current team: Galway United
- Number: 14

Youth career
- 2010–2020: Barnsley

Senior career*
Years	Team	Apps	(Gls)
2020–2025	Barnsley	33	(0)
2020–2021	→ Notts County (loan)	3	(0)
2021	→ Esbjerg (loan)	16	(1)
2025	Sligo Rovers	22	(0)
2026–	Galway United	25	(3)
- * Club domestic league appearances and goals as of 18:56, 10 November 2026 (UTC)

Matthew Ryan Wolfe (born 12 June 2000) is an English professional footballer who plays as a midfielder for League of Ireland Premier Division club Galway United.

== Career ==
Wolfe joined Barnsley at the age of 10. On 19 July 2020, he made his professional league debut as a substitute in a 1-0 victory over Nottingham Forest. On 15 October 2020, Wolfe joined National League side Notts County on a three-month loan deal. On 5 January 2021, the loan was then extended until the end of the season.

On 12 July 2021, Wolfe and three other Barnsley teammates, was loaned out to Danish 1st Division club Esbjerg fB for the rest of 2021.

On returning to Barnsley Wolfe made 16 appearances in the remainder of the 2021-22 championship season, winning the Young Player of the Year award.

Following relegation to League One Wolfe made 16 appearances before a serious knee injury cut his season short in January.

On 22 January 2025, Wolfe signed for League of Ireland Premier Division club Sligo Rovers.

On 4 December 2025, Wolfe signed for fellow Irish club Galway United ahead of the 2026 season.

== Career statistics ==
As of match played 19 October 2026

Appearances and goals by club, season and competition
Club	Season	League			National Cup (Note: Includes FA Cup, Danish Cup & FAI Cup)		League Cup (Note: Includes EFL Cup)		Other		Total	
Club	Season	Division	Apps	Goals	Apps	Goals	Apps	Goals	Apps	Goals	Apps	Goals
Barnsley	2019–20	EFL Championship	1	0	0	0	0	0	–		1	0
Barnsley	2020–21	EFL Championship	0	0	0	0	0	0	–		0	0
Barnsley	2021–22	EFL Championship	16	0	0	0	0	0	–		16	0
Barnsley	2022–23	EFL League One	13	0	1	0	1	0	1 (Note: Appearance(s) in the EFL Trophy)	0	16	0
Barnsley	2023–24	EFL League One	0	0	0	0	0	0	0	0	0	0
Barnsley	2024–25	EFL League One	0	0	0	0	0	0	0	0	0	0
Barnsley	Total		30	0	1	0	1	0	1	0	33	0
Notts County (loan)	2020–21	National League	3	0	–		–		4 (Note: Appearance(s) in the FA Trophy)	1	7	1
Esbjerg (loan)	2021–22	Danish Superliga	16	1	2	0	–		–		18	1
Sligo Rovers	2025	LOI Premier Division	22	0	1	0	–		–		23	0
Galway United	2026	LOI Premier Division	25	3	2	2	–		–		27	5
Career total			94	2	6	2	2	0	5	1	108	7
