= Steven Simpson =

Canadian soccer player (born 2000)

Personal information
- Full name: Steven Jamal Simpson
- Date of birth: 5 April 2000 (age 26)
- Place of birth: Spanish Town, Jamaica
- Height: 1.79 m (5 ft 10 in)
- Positions: Right-back; right winger

Team information
- Current team: Vendsyssel
- Number: 10

Youth career
- 2005–2014: Power Soccer FC
- 2014–2019: Boldmere St. Michaels
- 2019–2021: Barnsley

Senior career*
Years	Team	Apps	(Gls)
2021	Barnsley	0	(0)
2021	→ Esbjerg fB (loan)	3	(0)
2021–2024	Esbjerg fB	59	(11)
2024–2025	AB	26	(3)
2025–	Vendsyssel	30	(4)
- * Club domestic league appearances and goals as of 18 June 2026

Steven Jamal Simpson (born 5 April 2000) is a Jamaican footballer who plays as a right-back or right winger for Danish 2nd Division club Vendsyssel FF.

== Club career ==
After spending time with Barnsley's Shadow Scholarship program, he signed a contract and joined their academy in October 2020. He signed a one-year contract extension with the club on July 3, 2021.

On July 11 Simpson was loaned to Danish 1st Division club Esbjerg fB on a half-season deal until December 31. However, only two months later, on September 8, 2021, the club confirmed that he had signed a permanent deal until June 2024 with Esbjerg. He left the club in the summer of 2024 at the end of his contract.

On transfer deadline day, August 30, 2024, Simpson moved to Danish 2nd Division side AB. He left the club again on 6 July 2025.

On 14 July 2025, Simpson joined Danish 2nd Division club Vendsyssel FF on a deal until June 2027.

== International career ==
In February 2021, Simpson was named to Canada's 50-man preliminary squad for the rescheduled 2020 CONCACAF Men's Olympic Qualifying Championship.

== Honours ==
Esbjerg fB

- Danish 2nd Division: 2023–24
