= Liam Lindsay =

Scottish footballer (born 1995)

- Lindsay with Preston North End in 2026.

Personal information
- Full name: Liam James Lindsay
- Date of birth: 12 October 1995 (age 31)
- Place of birth: Glasgow, Scotland
- Height: 6 ft 4 in (1.93 m)
- Position: Centre back

Team information
- Current team: Preston North End
- Number: 6

Youth career
- 2011–2012: Partick Thistle

Senior career*
Years	Team	Apps	(Gls)
2012–2017	Partick Thistle	64	(7)
2014	→ Alloa Athletic (loan)	10	(0)
2015	→ Airdrieonians (loan)	13	(1)
2017–2019	Barnsley	83	(2)
2019–2021	Stoke City	20	(1)
2021	→ Preston North End (loan)	13	(2)
2021–	Preston North End	167	(7)
- * Club domestic league appearances and goals as of 09:22, 22 November 2026 (UTC)

Liam James Lindsay (born 12 October 1995) is a Scottish professional footballer who plays as a centre back for EFL Championship club Preston North End.

Lindsay started his career with Partick Thistle breaking into the first team at Firhill after loan spells with Alloa Athletic and Airdrieonians. After a successful 2016–17 season with the Jags which saw him named in the PFA Scotland Team of the Year, Lindsay joined English Championship side Barnsley. The Tykes were relegated from the Championship in 2017–18 but were able to gain an instant return in 2018–19 finishing 2nd in EFL League One. Lindsay joined Stoke City in June 2019 for an initial fee of £2 million.

== Club career ==
=== Partick Thistle ===
Lindsay was born in Glasgow and attended St Ninian's High School in Giffnock where he played in the school football team along with Andrew Robertson. After joining the youth system at Partick Thistle in 2011, Lindsay signed his first professional contract with the club on 6 June 2012. He made his debut for the club in their final match of the 2012–13 season, a 0–0 draw away to Dumbarton on 4 May 2013. On 31 January 2014, Lindsay signed for Scottish Championship club Alloa Athletic on loan for the rest of the 2013–14 season. He made his debut on 1 February 2014, as Alloa drew 1–1 with Dundee. He played 11 times for Alloa helping them to avoid a relegation play-off.

After returning to Partick Thistle, Lindsay signed a new two-year contract with the club in June 2014. Lindsay made his full Scottish Premiership debut, playing 90 minutes on 4 January 2015, in a 2–2 draw with high-flying Dundee United. On 29 January 2015, Lindsay signed for Scottish League One side Airdrieonians on a loan deal until the end of the 2014–15 season. Lindsay played 13 matches for Airdrieonians scoring once in a 1–0 away win against Peterhead on 25 April 2015.

Lindsay broke into Thistle's first team in the 2015–16 season after impressing manager Alan Archibald in pre-season. He scored his first goal for Partick Thistle in a 1–1 draw with Dundee on 8 December 2015. He was sent-off twice during the campaign firstly against Kilmarnock in August 2015 and then against Dundee in January 2016. Lindsay played 27 times in 2015–16 as Thistle finished in 9th position. He became a main stay of the defence in 2016–17 which saw him make 42 appearances, scoring seven goals as the Jags finished in 6th position after.

Lindsay was named in the Scottish Premiership 2016–17 Team of the Year; he was only player outside of Aberdeen and Celtic to be in the team.

=== Barnsley ===
In June 2017, he turned down a prospective transfer to English club Oxford United. Later that month Partick Thistle accepted an offer for Lindsay from Barnsley. Lindsay signed a three-year contract with Barnsley on 22 June. He made his Barnsley debut on 26 August 2017 in a 3–0 victory against Sunderland. Lindsay settled into life at Barnsley well and by November 2017 there were calls for him to earn a Scotland call-up. However Barnsley hit poor form around December and they ended up being relegated after losing 4–1 at Derby County in the final match of the 2017–18 season. In 2018–19 under the management of Daniel Stendel, Lindsay formed a strong partnership with Ethan Pinnock as the Tykes held the best defensive record in the EFL with only 39 goals conceded and kept 21 clean sheets helping them secure second spot and a return to the Championship at the first time of asking.

=== Stoke City ===
Lindsay joined Stoke City on 25 June 2019 for an initial fee of £2 million, rising to £2.5 million, along with Barnsley teammate Adam Davies. Lindsay made his debut on 10 August 2019 in a 3–1 defeat against Charlton Athletic. He scored his first goal for Stoke against Birmingham City on 31 August 2019. The team began the season in poor form and were struggling at the bottom of the table which resulted in a change of manager in November 2019. Lindsay kept his spot in the team until Michael O'Neill brought in James Chester in January and he took Lindsay's place for the remainder of the 2019–20 season. In August 2020 he was linked with a transfer away from the club, to Sheffield Wednesday or Huddersfield Town.

=== Preston North End ===
On 1 February 2021, Lindsay joined Preston North End on loan for the remainder of the 2020–21 season. Lindsay made 13 appearances for Preston scoring twice. Lindsay made his move to Preston permanent on 9 June 2021, joining for an undisclosed fee.

== International career ==
Lindsay received the first international call-up of his career for the Scottish national team aged 28, on 1 October 2024, for Scotland's UEFA Nations League fixtures with Croatia and Portugal.

== Personal life ==
Lindsay's uncle Ricky Gillies was also a professional footballer, whilst his father, James, was once on the books at Celtic.

== Career statistics ==
As of match played 21 November 2026

Appearances and goals by club, season and competition
Club	Season	League			National cup (Note: Includes Scottish Cup, FA Cup)		League cup (Note: Includes Scottish League Cup, EFL Cup)		Other		Total	
Club	Season	Division	Apps	Goals	Apps	Goals	Apps	Goals	Apps	Goals	Apps	Goals
Partick Thistle	2012–13	Scottish First Division	1	0	0	0	0	0	0	0	1	0
Partick Thistle	2013–14	Scottish Premiership	1	0	0	0	0	0	—		1	0
Partick Thistle	2014–15	Scottish Premiership	1	0	0	0	0	0	—		1	0
Partick Thistle	2015–16	Scottish Premiership	25	1	2	0	0	0	—		27	1
Partick Thistle	2016–17	Scottish Premiership	35	6	2	0	4	1	—		42	7
Partick Thistle	Total		63	7	4	0	4	1	0	0	71	8
Alloa Athletic (loan)	2013–14	Scottish Championship	10	0	1	0	0	0	0	0	11	0
Airdrieonians (loan)	2014–15	Scottish League One	13	1	0	0	0	0	0	0	13	1
Barnsley	2017–18	Championship	42	1	1	0	1	0	—		44	1
Barnsley	2018–19	League One	41	1	3	0	0	0	2	1	46	2
Barnsley	Total		83	2	4	0	1	0	2	1	90	3
Stoke City	2019–20	Championship	20	1	1	0	2	0	—		23	1
Stoke City	2020–21	Championship	0	0	0	0	0	0	—		0	0
Stoke City	Total		20	1	1	0	2	0	0	0	23	1
Preston North End (loan)	2020–21	Championship	13	2	0	0	0	0	—		13	2
Preston North End	2021–22	Championship	15	0	0	0	2	0	—		17	0
Preston North End	2022–23	Championship	37	0	2	0	0	0	—		39	0
Preston North End	2023–24	Championship	46	3	1	0	0	0	—		47	3
Preston North End	2024–25	Championship	35	1	4	0	4	0	—		43	1
Preston North End	2025–26	Championship	26	2	1	0	1	1	—		28	3
Preston North End	2026–27	Championship	8	1	0	0	1	0	—		9	1
Preston North End	Total		167	7	8	0	8	1	0	0	181	8
Career total			368	20	18	0	15	2	2	1	404	23

== Honours ==
Barnsley

- EFL League One runner-up: 2018–19

Individual

- PFA Scotland Team of the Year: 2016–17 Scottish Premiership
