= 2017–18 Barnsley F.C. season =

Barnsley
2017–18 season
- Owner: Chien Lee (80%); James Cryne/The Cryne Family (20%); Paul Conway; Grace Hung; Neerav Parekh; Billy Beane
- Chairman: Chien Lee (co-chairman); Paul Conway (co-chairman)
- Head Coach: José Morais
- Stadium: Oakwell
- Championship: 22nd (relegated)
- FA Cup: Third round (Vs. Millwall)
- EFL Cup: Third round (Vs. Tottenham Hotspur)
- Top goalscorer: League: Tom Bradshaw (9); All: Tom Bradshaw (12)
Home colours	Away colours	Third colours

The 2017–18 season had Barnsley playing in the Championship The season covered the period from 1 July 2017 to 30 June 2018. Barnsley made an announcement on their official Twitter account on 3 August 2017 that Angus MacDonald is the first-team captain, and Adam Davies is the first team vice-captain.

On 31 August 2017, Barnsley released a statement to announce that the club's chairman Maurice Watkins CBE was leaving the role as chairman and the board of Barnsley Football Club.

On 19 December 2017, it was announced that Patrick Cyrne and family had agreed of new shareholders and co-owners of Barnsley Football Club to a consortium led by Chien Lee of NewCity Capital and Pacific Media Group, which is led by Paul Conway and Grace Hung. Billy Beane and Neerav Parekh will also be investing in Barnsley Football Club with Chien Lee and Pacific Media Group. Chien Lee has 80% shares and the Cyrne family has 20% shares of ownership of Barnsley Football club.

On 6 February 2018, Barnsley F.C. made an announcement that Head Coach Paul Heckingbottom, had left the club for new manager role at fellow Championship club Leeds United. Heckingbottom was joined by his first team coach, Jamie Clapham; Head of Sports Science, Nathan Winder; and First Team Performance Analyst Alex Bailey, will also leave Oakwell for Leeds. Barnsley also announced that Paul Harsley took the role as caretaker manager. José Morais was appointed as new head coach on 16 February 2018 on an 18-month contract.

== Squad ==
No.	Name	Pos.	Nat.	Place of Birth	Age	Apps	Goals	Signed from	Date signed	Fee	Contract End
Goalkeepers
1	Adam Davies (vice-captain)	GK	(Wales) (Germany)	Rinteln	34	163	0	Sheffield Wednesday	13 June 2014	Free	2019
13	Nick Townsend	GK	(England)	Solihull	31	18	0	Birmingham City	1 September 2015	Undisclosed	2018
Defenders
2	Jason McCarthy	RB	(England)	Southampton	29	22	0	Southampton	1 July 2017	£207,000	2020
3	Zeki Fryers	LB	(England)	Manchester	33	23	1	Crystal Palace	1 July 2017	Free	2020
5	Matt Mills	CB	(England)	Swindon	40	4	0	Nottingham Forest	31 January 2018	Free	2018
6	Liam Lindsay	CB	(Scotland)	Paisley	30	43	1	Partick Thistle	1 July 2017	£360,000	2020
12	Dimitri Kévin Cavaré	RB	(France)	Pointe-à-Pitre	31	9	0	Rennes	17 August 2017	Undisclosed	2019
16	Ethan Pinnock	CB	(England)	London	33	13	2	Forest Green Rovers	30 June 2017	£513,000	2020
17	Andy Yiadom (captain)	RB/RW	(Ghana) (England)	Holloway	34	65	0	Barnet	1 July 2016	Free	2018
18	Adam Jackson	CB	(England)	Darlington	32	34	2	Middlesbrough	30 August 2016	Undisclosed	2019
23	Daniel Pinillos	LB	(Spain)	Logroñ	33	8	0	Córdoba	19 January 2018	Undisclosed	2020
24	Matty Pearson	RB	(England)	Keighley	33	19	0	Accrington Stanley	4 August 2017	£500,000	2020
Midfielders
4	Joe Williams	CM	(England)	Liverpool	29	39	1	Everton	20 July 2017	Loan	2018
7	Adam Hammill	LM	(England)	Liverpool	38	201	26	Free agent	9 November 2015	Free	2018
10	George Moncur	CM	(England)	Swindon	33	50	4	Colchester United	21 June 2016	£500,000	Undisclosed
11	Lloyd Isgrove	RM	(Wales) (England)	Yeovil	33	53	2	Free agent	2 July 2017	Free	2020
14	Stevie Mallan	CM	(Scotland)	Glasgow	30	8	0	St Mirren	1 July 2017	£306,000	2019
20	Brad Potts	CM/RM	(England)	Hexham	32	40	4	Blackpool	3 August 2017	£756,000	2020
21	Connor Mahoney	WG	(England)	Blackburn	29	8	0	Bournemouth	29 January 2018	Loan	2018
22	Gary Gardner	CM	(England)	Solihull	34	30	2	Aston Villa	31 August 2017	Loan	2018
33	Christoph Knasmüllner	AM	(Austria)	Vienna	34	3	0	Admira Wacker Mödling	31 January 2018	Undisclosed	2020
34	Ryan Hedges	RM/LM	(Wales) (England)	Northampton	31	34	3	Swansea City	31 January 2017	Undisclosed	2019
Forwards
9	Tom Bradshaw	ST	(Wales) (England)	Swindon	34	88	21	Walsall	14 July 2016	£550,000	2019
15	Oli McBurnie	CF	(Scotland) (England)	Leeds	30	17	9	Swansea City	31 January 2018	Loan	2018
19	Kieffer Moore	ST	(England)	Torquay	34	21	3	Ipswich Town	8 January 2018	£765,000	2021
26	Mamadou Thiam	ST	(Senegal)	Aubervilliers	31	30	1	Dijon	11 August 2017	£900,000	2018
29	Victor Adeboyejo	ST	(Nigeria)	Ibadan	28	0	0	Leyton Orient	4 November 2017	Free	2020
Out on Loan
8	Cameron McGeehan	CM	(England)	Kingston upon Thames	31	10	1	Luton Town	23 June 2017	£990,000	2020
27	Alex Mowatt	CM	(England)	Doncaster	31	13	1	Leeds United	31 January 2017	£600,000	2019
31	Dylan Mottley-Henry	WG	(England)	Leeds	29	1	0	Bradford City	12 July 2016	Free	2018
35	Jacob Brown	ST	(England)	Halifax	27	2	0	Academy	1 July 2016	Trainee	2018
37	Jared Bird	CM	(England)	Nottingham	29	4	0	Academy	1 July 2017	Trainee	2020

Appearances and goals correct as of 8 May 2018.

=== Contracts ===
Date	Position	Nationality	Name	Status	Contract Length	Expiry Date	Ref.
14 December 2017	CM	(England)	Jared Bird	Signed	3 years	July 2020	

== Statistics ==
As of 8 May 2018

No.	Pos	Nat	Player	Total		Championship		FA Cup		League Cup	
No.	Pos	Nat	Player	Apps	Goals	Apps	Goals	Apps	Goals	Apps	Goals
1	GK	(Wales) WAL	Adam Davies	40	0	36+0	0	1+0	0	3+0	0
2	DF	(England) ENG	Jason McCarthy	24	0	17+3	0	1+0	0	3+0	0
3	DF	(England) ENG	Zeki Fryers	23	1	22+0	1	0+0	0	1+0	0
4	MF	(England) ENG	Joe Williams	37	1	32+1	1	1+0	0	3+0	0
5	DF	(England) ENG	Matt Mills	4	0	4+0	0	0+0	0	0+0	0
6	DF	(Scotland) SCO	Liam Lindsay	45	1	43+0	1	1+0	0	1+0	0
7	MF	(England) ENG	Adam Hammill	44	1	32+8	0	1+0	0	1+2	1
9	FW	(Wales) WAL	Tom Bradshaw	43	12	26+13	9	1+0	0	3+0	3
10	MF	(England) ENG	George Moncur	38	2	22+12	2	0+1	0	2+1	0
11	MF	(Wales) WAL	Lloyd Isgrove	17	1	10+6	1	1+0	0	0+0	0
12	DF	(France) FRA	Dimitri Kévin Cavaré	9	1	7+1	1	1+0	0	0+0	0
13	GK	(England) ENG	Nick Townsend	7	0	7+0	0	0+0	0	0+0	0
14	MF	(Scotland) SCO	Stevie Mallan	9	0	5+3	0	1+0	0	0+0	0
15	FW	(Scotland) SCO	Oli McBurnie	17	9	16+1	9	0+0	0	0+0	0
16	DF	(England) ENG	Ethan Pinnock	14	2	8+3	2	1+0	0	2+0	0
17	DF	(Ghana) GHA	Andy Yiadom	33	0	31+1	0	0+0	0	1+0	0
18	DF	(England) ENG	Adam Jackson	23	2	22+0	1	0+0	0	1+0	1
19	FW	(England) ENG	Kieffer Moore	20	4	16+4	4	0+0	0	0+0	0
20	MF	(England) ENG	Brad Potts	42	4	36+2	3	1+0	1	3+0	0
21	MF	(England) ENG	Connor Mahoney	8	0	3+5	0	0+0	0	0+0	0
22	MF	(England) ENG	Gary Gardner	30	2	28+1	2	1+0	0	0+0	0
23	DF	(Spain) ESP	Daniel Pinillos	8	0	7+1	0	0+0	0	0+0	0
24	DF	(England) ENG	Matty Pearson	19	0	14+3	0	0+0	0	2+0	0
26	FW	(Senegal) SEN	Mamadou Thiam	30	1	10+18	1	0+1	0	0+1	0
30	GK	(England) ENG	Jack Walton	3	0	3+0	0	0+0	0	0+0	0
33	MF	(Austria) AUT	Christoph Knasmüllner	3	0	1+2	0	0+0	0	0+0	0
34	MF	(Wales) WAL	Ryan Hedges	26	3	5+18	2	0+0	0	2+1	1
Players out on loan:
8	MF	(England) ENG	Cameron McGeehan	10	1	6+3	1	0+0	0	0+1	0
27	MF	(England) ENG	Alex Mowatt	2	0	1+0	0	0+0	0	0+1	0
31	MF	(England) ENG	Dylan Mottley-Henry	1	0	0+1	0	0+0	0	0+0	0
37	MF	(England) ENG	Jared Bird	4	0	0+3	0	0+0	0	1+0	0
Players who left the club:
5	DF	(England) ENG	Angus MacDonald	14	0	11+1	0	0+0	0	2+0	0
15	MF	(England) ENG	Harvey Barnes	25	5	18+5	5	0+0	0	2+0	0
19	FW	(England) ENG	Ike Ugbo	18	1	7+9	1	0+0	0	2+0	0
23	FW	(England) ENG	Stefan Payne	3	0	0+2	0	0+0	0	0+1	0

=== Goals record ===
As of 8 May 2018

Rank	No.	Nat.	Po.	Name	Championship	FA Cup	League Cup	Total
1	9	(Wales)	CF	Tom Bradshaw	9	0	3	12
2	15	(Scotland)	CF	Oli McBurnie	9	0	0	9
3	—	(England)	LW	Harvey Barnes	5	0	0	5
4	19	(England)	CF	Kieffer Moore	4	0	0	4
4	20	(England)	CM	Brad Potts	3	1	0	4
6	34	(England)	RW	Ryan Hedges	2	0	1	3
7	10	(England)	AM	George Moncur	2	0	0	2
7	16	(England)	CB	Ethan Pinnock	2	0	0	2
7	18	(England)	CB	Adam Jackson	1	0	1	2
7	22	(England)	CM	Gary Gardner	2	0	0	2
11	3	(England)	LB	Zeki Fryers	1	0	0	1
11	4	(England)	CM	Joe Williams	1	0	0	1
11	6	(Scotland)	CB	Liam Lindsay	1	0	0	1
11	7	(England)	RW	Adam Hammill	0	0	1	1
11	8	(England)	CM	Cameron McGeehan	1	0	0	1
11	11	(Wales)	LW	Lloyd Isgrove	1	0	0	1
11	12	(France)	RB	Dimitri Kévin Cavaré	1	0	0	1
11	26	(Senegal)	CF	Mamadou Thiam	1	0	0	1
11	—	(England)	CF	Ike Ugbo	1	0	0	1
Total					47	1	6	54

=== Disciplinary record ===
As of 8 May 2018

Rank	No.	Nat.	Po.	Name	Championship			FA Cup			League Cup			Total		
Rank	No.	Nat.	Po.	Name	Booked	(yellow card) (yellow-red card)	Sent off (straight red)	Booked	(yellow card) (yellow-red card)	Sent off (straight red)	Booked	(yellow card) (yellow-red card)	Sent off (straight red)	Booked	(yellow card) (yellow-red card)	Sent off (straight red)
1	4	(England)	CM	Joe Williams	9	0	0	0	0	1	0	0	0	9	0	1
2	22	(England)	CM	Gary Gardner	8	0	0	1	0	0	0	0	0	9	0	0
3	6	(Scotland)	CB	Liam Lindsay	8	0	0	0	0	0	0	0	0	8	0	0
3	7	(England)	RW	Adam Hammill	8	0	0	0	0	0	0	0	0	8	0	0
3	17	(Ghana)	RB	Andy Yiadom	7	0	0	0	0	0	1	0	0	8	0	0
6	2	(England)	RB	Jason McCarthy	4	0	0	0	0	0	1	0	0	5	0	0
6	20	(England)	CM	Brad Potts	4	0	0	0	0	0	1	0	0	5	0	0
8	12	(France)	RB	Dimitri Kévin Cavaré	1	0	1	1	0	0	0	0	0	2	0	1
8	24	(England)	LB	Matty Pearson	4	0	0	0	0	0	0	0	0	4	0	0
10	19	(England)	CF	Kieffer Moore	3	0	0	0	0	0	0	0	0	3	0	0
11	8	(England)	CM	Cameron McGeehan	2	0	0	0	0	0	0	0	0	2	0	0
11	9	(Wales)	CF	Tom Bradshaw	2	0	0	0	0	0	0	0	0	2	0	0
11	15	(Scotland)	CF	Oli McBurnie	2	0	0	0	0	0	0	0	0	2	0	0
11	18	(England)	CB	Adam Jackson	2	0	0	0	0	0	0	0	0	2	0	0
15	1	(Wales)	GK	Adam Davies	1	0	0	0	0	0	0	0	0	1	0	0
15	3	(England)	LB	Zeki Fryers	1	0	0	0	0	0	0	0	0	1	0	0
15	5	(England)	CB	Angus MacDonald	0	0	1	0	0	0	0	0	0	0	0	1
15	10	(England)	AM	George Moncur	1	0	0	0	0	0	0	0	0	1	0	0
15	11	(Wales)	LW	Lloyd Isgrove	1	0	0	0	0	0	0	0	0	1	0	0
15	14	(Scotland)	CM	Stevie Mallan	1	0	0	0	0	0	0	0	0	1	0	0
15	16	(England)	CB	Ethan Pinnock	1	0	0	0	0	0	0	0	0	1	0	0
15	26	(Senegal)	CF	Mamadou Thiam	1	0	0	0	0	0	0	0	0	1	0	0
15	—	(England)	LW	Harvey Barnes	1	0	0	0	0	0	0	0	0	1	0	0
Total					73	0	2	2	0	1	3	0	0	78	0	3

== Pre-season ==
=== Friendlies ===
As of 9 June 2017, Barnsley have announced six pre-season friendlies against Guiseley, Grimsby Town, Coventry City, Rochdale, Rotherham United and Huddersfield Town.

11 July 2017 Friendly	Guiseley	3–3	Barnsley	Guiseley
19:30 BST	Trialist 34'; Trialist 41'; Thompson 73'	Report	Isgrove 17'; Fryers 58'; Moncur 88'	Stadium: Nethermoor Park

15 July 2017 Friendly	Grimsby Town	2–1	Barnsley	Cleethorpes
12:30 BST	Dembele 46'; Robinson 85'	Report	Isgrove 38'	Stadium: Blundell Park; Attendance: 1903 (770 away fans)

18 July 2017 Friendly	Barnsley	3–1	Coventry City	Barnsley
19:45 BST	Mallan 24'; Payne 40'; Bradshaw 67'	Report	Beavon 54'	Stadium: Oakwell

22 July 2017 Friendly	Barnsley	0–1	Huddersfield Town	Barnsley
16:00 BST		Report	Mounié 89'	Stadium: Oakwell

25 July 2017 Friendly	Rochdale	0–2	Barnsley	Spotland
19:30 BST		Report	Ugbo 69', 89'	Stadium: Spotland Stadium; Attendance: 989

29 July 2017 Friendly	Rotherham United	4–0	Barnsley	Rotherham
15:00 BST	Proctor 67', 73', 75'; Moore 90+1'	Report		Stadium: AESSEAL New York Stadium

== Competitions ==
=== EFL Championship ===
==== League table ====
Pos	Team	Pld	W	D	L	GF	GA	GD	Pts	Promotion, qualification or relegation
20	Reading	46	10	14	22	48	70	−22	44	
21	Bolton Wanderers	46	10	13	23	39	74	−35	43	
22	Barnsley (R)	46	9	14	23	48	72	−24	41	Relegation to EFL League One
23	Burton Albion (R)	46	10	11	25	38	81	−43	41	Relegation to EFL League One
24	Sunderland (R)	46	7	16	23	52	80	−28	37	Relegation to EFL League One

Source: English Football League
Rules for classification: 1) Points; 2) Goal difference; 3) Number of goals scored
(R) Relegated

==== Result summary ====
Overall								Home						Away					
Pld	W	D	L	GF	GA	GD	Pts	W	D	L	GF	GA	GD	W	D	L	GF	GA	GD
44	8	14	22	45	68	−23	38	4	9	9	23	32	−9	4	5	13	22	36	−14

Last updated: 24 April 2018.

==== Results by matchday ====
Matchday	1	2	3	4	5	6	7	8	9	10	11	12	13	14	15	16	17	18	19	20	21	22	23	24	25	26	27	28	29	30	31	32	33	34	35	36	37	38	39	40	41	42	43	44
Ground	A	H	H	A	H	A	H	A	H	A	H	H	A	A	H	A	H	H	A	A	H	A	H	H	H	A	H	A	H	A	H	H	A	A	A	A	H	H	H	H	A	H	A	A
Result	L	L	W	L	W	D	L	L	D	W	D	L	D	W	W	D	L	L	L	L	L	D	L	D	D	W	D	L	L	L	D	L	W	D	L	L	D	L	D	W	L	D	L	L
Position	23	23	16	20	15	14	20	21	20	18	19	19	19	19	16	16	17	18	18	20	20	20	20	20	20	19	19	19	19	21	22	23	19	21	21	21	21	21	21	22	22	22	22	22

Updated to match(es) played on 24 April 2018. Source: Statto.com
A = Away; H = Home; W = Win; D = Draw; L = Loss

==== Matches ====
On 21 June 2017, the EFL Championship league fixtures were announced.

5 August 2017 1	Bristol City	3–1	Barnsley	Ashton Gate
15:00 BST	Reid 16', 30'; Diédhiou 25'; Pack (yellow card) 66'	Report	McCarthy (yellow card) 77'; Hammill (yellow card) 90'; Hedges 90+3'	Stadium: Ashton Gate Stadium; Attendance: 18,742; Referee: Andy Davies

12 August 2017 2	Barnsley	1–2	Ipswich Town	Barnsley
15:00 BST	Bradshaw 15'; Jackson (yellow card) 47'	Report	Iorfa (yellow card) 52'; McGoldrick 53'; Knudsen (yellow card) 54'; Waghorn 70'	Stadium: Oakwell; Attendance: 12,009; Referee: Geoff Eltringham

15 August 2017 3	Barnsley	2–1	Nottingham Forest	Barnsley
19:45 BST	Bradshaw 4'; Hedges 50'; Potts (yellow card) 81'; Williams (yellow card) 87'	Report	26' Murphy; (yellow card) 30' Mancienne	Stadium: Oakwell; Attendance: 13,883; Referee: Tony Harrington

19 August 2017 4	Sheffield United	1–0	Barnsley	Sheffield
12:15 BST	Sharp 17' (yellow card) 21'; Clarke (red card) 42'; Fleck (yellow card) 58'; Stevens (yellow card) 84'	Report	McCarthy (yellow card) 31'; MacDonald (red card) 42'; Hammill (yellow card) 45+2'; Pearson (yellow card) 48'	Stadium: Bramall Lane; Attendance: 25,482; Referee: Tim Robinson

26 August 2017 5	Barnsley	3–0	Sunderland	Barnsley
15:00 BST	Ugbo 31'; Barnes 35'; Lindsay (yellow card) 40'; Moncur 67'	Report	Oviedo (yellow card) 77'; McGeady (yellow card) 86'; Khazri (yellow card) 90+3'	Stadium: Oakwell; Attendance: 15,697; Referee: Christopher Kavanagh

9 September 2017 6	Preston North End	1–1	Barnsley	Preston
15:00 BST	Maguire 23'; Hugill (yellow card) 36'	Report	Potts 26'; McCarthy (yellow card) 50'; Pearson (yellow card) 87'	Stadium: Deepdale; Attendance: 12,813; Referee: Peter Banks

12 September 2017 P	Reading	P–P	Barnsley	Reading
20:00 BST (UTC+1)				Stadium: Madejski Stadium
Note: Match postponed on 31 August due to second round EFL Cup match against Derby County being moved to the same date.

16 September 2017 7	Barnsley	0–3	Aston Villa	Barnsley
17:30 BST	Hammill (yellow card) 25'	Report	Adomah 19', 44' (pen.); Davis 55'; Whelan (yellow card) 76'; Hourihane (yellow card) 90+3'	Stadium: Oakwell; Attendance: 14,633; Referee: Simon Hooper

23 September 2017 8	Wolverhampton Wanderers	2–1	Barnsley	Wolverhampton
15:00 BST	Neves (yellow card) 47'; Coady (yellow card) 57'; Saiss (yellow card) 70'; Enobakhare 80'; N'Diaye 90+3'	Report	Williams (yellow card) 27'; Jackson 90+1'	Stadium: Molineux; Attendance: 28,154; Referee: Jeremy Simpson

26 September 2017 9	Barnsley	1–1	Queens Park Rangers	Barnsley
19:45	Barnes 20'; Williams (yellow card) 49'	Report	Caulker (yellow card) 23'; Luongo (yellow card) 39'; Freeman 87'	Stadium: Oakwell; Attendance: 10,920; Referee: Geoff Eltringham

30 September 2017 10	Millwall	1–3	Barnsley	Bermondsey
15:00	Gregory 45+2' (pen.); Wallace (yellow card) 64'; Ferguson (yellow card) 82'	Report	Bradshaw 40', 60'; Pearson (yellow card) 45+1'; McGeehan (yellow card) 48'; Thiam 83' (pen.); McCarthy (yellow card) 85'	Stadium: The Den; Attendance: 12,147; Referee: Oliver Langford

14 October 2017 11	Barnsley	2–2	Middlesbrough	Barnsley
15:00 BST	Bradshaw 2'; McGeehan 9'; Pearson (yellow card) 73'; Williams (yellow card) 74'	Report	Braithwaite 7'; Assombalonga 60'	Stadium: Oakwell; Attendance: 17,163; Referee: Lee Mason

21 October 2017 12	Barnsley	0–1	Hull City	Barnsley
15:00 BST	McGeehan (yellow card) 55'	Report	Stewart (yellow card) 29'; Campbell 78', (yellow card) 83'; McGregor (yellow card) 90+2'	Stadium: Oakwell; Attendance: 13,624; Referee: Peter Bankes

28 October 2017 13	Sheffield Wednesday	1–1	Barnsley	Owlerton
12:30 BST	Reach 34' (yellow card) 87' van Aken (yellow card) 45'	Report	Hammill (yellow card) 37'; Barnes 67'	Stadium: Hillsborough Stadium; Attendance: 27,097; Referee: Anthony Taylor

31 October 2017 14	Burton Albion	2–4	Barnsley	Burton upon Trent
19:45 GMT	Lund 38'; Dyer 45+3'	Report	Isgrove 21' (yellow card) 66'; Potts 40'; Williams 73'; Barnes 87'	Stadium: Pirelli Stadium; Attendance: 3,760; Referee: Jeremy Simpson

4 November 2017 15	Barnsley	2–0	Birmingham City	Barnsley
15:00 GMT	Bradshaw 2'; Fryers 68'	Report	Kieftenbeld (yellow card) 38'; Roberts (yellow card) 61'	Stadium: Oakwell; Attendance: 12,946; Referee: James Linington

18 November 2017 16	Norwich City	1–1	Barnsley	Norwich
15:00 GMT	Murphy 12'; Husband (yellow card) 34'	Report	Yiadom (yellow card) 44'; Barnes 47'; Williams (yellow card) 87'	Stadium: Carrow Road; Attendance: 25,545; Referee: Scott Duncan

21 November 2017 17	Barnsley	0–1	Cardiff City	Barnsley
19:45 GMT		Report	Ralls (yellow card) 79'; Paterson 83'; Bamba (yellow card) 90+1'	Stadium: Oakwell; Attendance: 11,051; Referee: David Coote

25 November 2017 18	Barnsley	0–2	Leeds United	Barnsley
12:30 GMT	Barnes (yellow card) 15'; Gardner (yellow card) 48'; Hammill (yellow card) 75'	Report	Jansson (yellow card) 3'; Ayling (yellow card) 15'; Sáiz 23'; Alioski 45+4'; Hernández (yellow card) 53'	Stadium: Oakwell; Attendance: 16,399; Referee: Andrew Madley

28 November 2017 19	Reading	3–0	Barnsley	Reading
20:00 GMT	Edwards 20' van den Berg 29'; Böðvarsson 88'	Report	Williams (yellow card) 83'	Stadium: Madejski Stadium; Attendance: 13,317; Referee: Darren Bond

2 December 2017 20	Bolton Wanderers	3–1	Barnsley	Bolton
15:00 GMT	Madine 20', 39'; Ameobi (yellow card) 37'; Henry (yellow card) 55'; Vela (yellow card) 60'; Little 69'; Pratley (yellow card) 89'	Report	Bradshaw 22', (yellow card) 28'; Potts (yellow card) 56'; Williams (yellow card) 60'; Thiam (yellow card) 89'; Yiadom (yellow card) 90+6'	Stadium: Macron Stadium; Attendance: 14,371; Referee: Oliver Langford

9 December 2017 21	Barnsley	0–3	Derby County	Barnsley
15:00 GMT		www.bbc.co.uk/sport/football/42205343	Lawrence 39'; Vydra 44'; Weimann (yellow card) 63', (goal) 78'	Stadium: Oakwell; Attendance: 13,973; Referee: Tim Robinson

16 December 2017 22	Brentford	0–0	Barnsley	Brentford
15:00 GMT	Sawyers (yellow card) 90+2'	Report	Yiadom (yellow card) 59'; Gardner (yellow card) 90+1'	Stadium: Griffin Park; Attendance: 9,868; Referee: David Coote

23 December 2017 23	Fulham	2–1	Barnsley	London
15:00 GMT	Ojo (yellow card) 28', (goal) 72'; Ayité 54'	Report	Yiadom (yellow card) 4'; Gardener (yellow card) 14'; Bradshaw 68'	Stadium: Craven Cottage; Attendance: 17,308; Referee: James Linington

26 December 2017 24	Barnsley	0–0	Preston North End	Barnsley
15:00 GMT	Williams (yellow card) 90+2'	Report	Woods (yellow card) 9'; Huntington (yellow card) 12'; Harrop (yellow card) 77'	Stadium: Oakwell; Attendance: 14,014; Referee: Geoff Eltringham

30 December 2017 25	Barnsley	1–1	Reading	Barnsley
15:00 GMT	Pinnock 90+1'	Report	Kermongant 68'; Aluko (yellow card) 85'	Stadium: Oakwell; Attendance: 11,945; Referee: Simon Hooper

1 January 2018 26	Sunderland	0–1	Barnsley	Sunderland
15:00 GMT	Love (yellow card) 61'	Report	Potts (yellow card) 11'; Pinnock 47'; Lindsay (yellow card) 50'; Davies (yellow card) 67'; Bradshaw (yellow card) 80'; Fryers (yellow card) 90+1'	Stadium: Stadium of Light; Attendance: 28,311; Referee: Robert Jones

13 January 2018 27	Barnsley	0–0	Wolverhampton Wanderers	Barnsley
15:00 GMT	Mallan (yellow card) 43'	Report	Saïss (yellow card) 29'; Jota (yellow card) 40'	Stadium: Oakwell; Attendance: 16,050

20 January 2018 28	Aston Villa	3–1	Barnsley	Birmingham
15:00 GMT	Hogan 5', 7'; Hourihane 19'	Report	Cavaré 11'; Moore (yellow card) 41'; Pinnock (yellow card) 81'	Stadium: Villa Park; Attendance: 31,869; Referee: Scott Duncan

27 January 2018 29	Barnsley	1–3	Fulham	Barnsley
15:00 GMT	Lindsay 31'; Hammill (yellow card) 36'; Cavare (yellow card) 39' (yellow-red card) 45'; Lindsay (yellow card) 56'	Report	Bettinelli (yellow card) 31'; Johansen (yellow card) 45+1'; Sessegnon 49', 90+5'; McDonald 90+2'	Stadium: Oakwell; Attendance: 12,147; Referee: Andy Davies

3 February 2018 30	Queens Park Rangers	1–0	Barnsley	Shepherd's Bush, London
15:00 GMT	Cousins (yellow card) 6'; Scowen 48'; Manning (red card) 71'; Robinson (yellow card) 90+4'	Report	Gardner (yellow card) 33'	Stadium: Loftus Road; Attendance: 12,413; Referee: Tony Harrington

10 February 2018 31	Barnsley	1–1	Sheffield Wednesday	Barnsley
12:15 GMT	McBurnie 21'; Hammill (yellow card) 45'		Nuhiu 18', (yellow card) 19'; Jones (yellow card) 79'; Wallace (yellow card) 90+3'	Stadium: Oakwell; Attendance: 16,858; Referee: Lee Probert

20 February 2018 32	Barnsley	1–2	Burton Albion	Barnsley
19:45 GMT	Williams (yellow card) 55'; Moore 75'	Report	Allen 1', (yellow card) 88'; Davenport 45+4'; MacFadzean (yellow card) 50'; Naylor (yellow card) 62'; Akins (yellow card) 74'	Stadium: Oakwell; Attendance: 11,774; Referee: Tim Robinson

24 February 2018 33	Birmingham City	0–2	Barnsley	Birmingham
15:00 GMT	Gallagher (yellow card) 24'; Gardner (yellow card) 32'; Dean (yellow card) 74'	Report	McBurnie 12', 36'	Stadium: St Andrew's; Attendance: 19,822; Referee: Jeremy Simpson

27 February 2018 34	Hull City	1–1	Barnsley	Kingston upon Hull
19:45 GMT	MacDonald (yellow card) 47'; Clark (yellow card) 48'; McGregor (yellow card) 67'; Dawson 73'; Campbell (yellow card) 90+2'	Report	McBurnie 22'; Lindsay (yellow card) 51'; Cavaré (yellow card) 71'	Stadium: KCOM Stadium; Attendance: 14,005; Referee: Mike Jones

3 March 2018 P	Barnsley	v	Norwich City	Barnsley
15:00 GMT				Stadium: Oakwell
Note: Match postponed due to a frozen pitch preventing play.

6 March 2018 35	Cardiff City	2–1	Barnsley	Cardiff
19:45 GMT	Grujić (yellow card) 14', (goal) 46'; Paterson 31'; Halford (yellow card) 81'	www.bbc.co.uk/sport/football/43206633	Gardner (yellow card) 14'; McBurnie 60'; Yiadom (yellow card) 83'; Moore (yellow card) 85'	Stadium: Cardiff City Stadium; Attendance: 16,176; Referee: Robert Jones

10 March 2018 36	Middlesbrough	3–1	Barnsley	Middlesbrough
15:00 GMT	Ayala 1'; Traoré 18'; Bamford 53'	Report	Gardner (yellow card) 5'; Moore 58'	Stadium: Riverside Stadium; Attendance: 24,917; Referee: Andy Davies

13 March 2018 37	Barnsley	1–1	Norwich City	Barnsley
15:00 GMT	Lindsay (yellow card) 14'; McBurnie 45'; Gary Gardner (yellow card) 75'	Report	Murphy 71'; Vrančić (yellow card) 77'	Stadium: Oakwell; Attendance: 11,508; Referee: Steve Martin

17 March 2018 38	Barnsley	0–2	Millwall	Barnsley
15:00 GMT		Report	Gregory 24'; Marshall 63'	Stadium: Oakwell; Attendance: 13,041; Referee: Peter Bankes

30 March 2018 39	Barnsley	2–2	Bristol City	Barnsley
15:00 BST	Moore 7'; Potts 78', (yellow card) 79'	Report	Wright (yellow card) 6'; Diédhiou 31'; Brownhill 90+1'	Stadium: Oakwell; Attendance: 12,236; Referee: David Webb

7 April 2018 40	Barnsley	3–2	Sheffield United	Barnsley
12:15 BST	Gardner 25'; McBurnie (yellow card) 34', (goal) 74'; Lindsay (yellow card) 45'; Bradshaw 88'	Report	O'Connell (yellow card) 36'; Brooks (yellow card) 45'; Fleck 57'; Clarke 65'	Stadium: Oakwell; Attendance: 16,041; Referee: Scott Duncan

10 April 2018 41	Ipswich Town	1–0	Barnsley	Ipswich
19:45 BST	Knudsen 54', (yellow card) 72'	Report	Yiadom (yellow card) 90'	Stadium: Portman Road; Attendance: 13,271; Referee: James Linington

14 April 2018 42	Barnsley	2–2	Bolton Wanderers	Barnsley
15:00 BST	Gardner 22', (yellow card) 57'; Moore (yellow card) 45'; Moncur (yellow card) 79'; McBurnie (yellow card) 81', (goal) 90+3'; Lindsay (yellow card) 90+4'	Report	Henry (yellow card) 13'; Ameobi (yellow card) 55'; Beevers (yellow card) 59'; Pratley (yellow card) 81' le Fondre 82' (pen.); Noone 85'	Stadium: Oakwell; Attendance: 14,138; Referee: Mike Jones

21 April 2018 43	Leeds United	2–1	Barnsley	Leeds
19:45 BST	Pearce 17'; Vieira (yellow card) 31'; Alioski 50'	Report	O'Connor 36' (o.g.); Hammill (yellow card) 87'	Stadium: Elland Road; Attendance: 30,451; Referee: Steve Martin

24 April 2018 44	Nottingham Forest	3–0	Barnsley	West Bridgford
19:45 BST	Fox (yellow card) 18'; Tomlin 26'; Brereton 36'; Guédioura (yellow card) 87'; Vellios 90'	Report	Jackson (yellow card) 53'	Stadium: The City Ground; Attendance: 23,633; Referee: Robert Jones

28 April 2018 45	Barnsley	2–0	Brentford	Barnsley
15:00 BST	Moore 11'; McBurnie 51'	Report	Barbet (yellow card) 82'	Stadium: Oakwell; Attendance: 13,127; Referee: Darren Bond

6 May 2018 46	Derby County	4–1	Barnsley	Derby
12:30 BST	Jerome 14'; Vydra 55'; Nugent 68', Lawrence 71'	Report	Moncur 80'	Stadium: Pride Park Stadium; Attendance: 30,682; Referee: Simon Hooper

=== FA Cup ===
In the FA Cup, Barnsley entered the competition in the third round and were drawn away to Millwall.

6 January 2018 Third round	Millwall	4–1	Barnsley	Bermondsey
15:00 GMT	O'Brien 35', 56'; Thompson 47'; Onyedinma 61'	Report	Potts 11'; Cavaré (yellow card) 39'; Williams (yellow card) 52'; Gardner (yellow card) 81'	Stadium: The Den; Attendance: 5,319; Referee: Darren Bond

=== EFL Cup ===
On 16 June 2017, the draw for the first round took place, with Morecambe being confirmed as the opposition. The second round also saw Barnsley at home to either Grimsby Town or Derby County. Derby County won their first round tie to set up a second round fixture against the Reds.

8 August 2017 First round	Barnsley	4–3	Morecambe	Barnsley
19:45 BST	Bradshaw 2', 46'; Ugbo 22'; Potts (yellow card) 71'; Yiadom (yellow card) 82'; Hedges 90+5'	Report	(yellow card) 36' Campbell; 45+1', (yellow card) 65' Lavelle 49' Rose; (yellow card) 76' Thompson; 82' Oliver	Stadium: Oakwell; Referee: Darren Bond

12 September 2017 Second round	Barnsley	3–2	Derby County	Barnsley
19:45 BST	Jackson 18'; Bradshaw 73'; McCarthy (yellow card) 76'; Hammill 89'	Report	Russell 7'; Bennett 39' (yellow card) 79'	Stadium: Oakwell; Referee: Eddie Ilderton

19 September 2017 Third round	Tottenham Hotspur	1–0	Barnsley	Wembley
20:00 BST	Alli 65'	Report		Stadium: Wembley Stadium; Attendance: 23,826; Referee: Tim Robinson

== Transfers ==
=== Transfers in ===
Date from	Position	Nationality	Name	From	Fee	Ref.
1 July 2017	LB	(England)	Zeki Fryers	Crystal Palace	Free	
1 July 2017	CB	(Scotland)	Liam Lindsay	Partick Thistle	£360,000	
1 July 2017	CM	(Scotland)	Stevie Mallan	St Mirren	£306,000	
1 July 2017	RB	(England)	Jason McCarthy	Southampton	£207,000	
1 July 2017	CM	(England)	Cameron McGeehan	Luton Town	£990,000	
1 July 2017	CB	(England)	Ethan Pinnock	Forest Green Rovers	£513,000	
1 July 2017	LB	(Wales)	Ben Williams	Blackburn Rovers	Free	
2 July 2017	LW	(Wales)	Lloyd Isgrove	Free agent	Free	
3 August 2017	CM	(England)	Brad Potts	Blackpool	£756,000	
4 August 2017	RB	(England)	Matty Pearson	Accrington Stanley	£500,000	
11 August 2017	CF	(Senegal)	Mamadou Thiam	Dijon	£900,000	
17 August 2017	RB	(France)	Dimitri Kévin Cavaré	Rennes	Undisclosed	
4 November 2017	CF	(Nigeria)	Victor Adeboyejo	Leyton Orient	Free	
8 January 2018	CF	(England)	Kieffer Moore	Ipswich Town	£765,000	
19 January 2018	LB	(Spain)	Daniel Pinillos	Córdoba	Undisclosed	
31 January 2018	AM	(Austria)	Christoph Knasmüllner	Admira Wacker	Undisclosed	
31 January 2018	CB	(England)	Matt Mills	Nottingham Forest	Free	

=== Transfers out ===
Date from	Position	Nationality	Name	To	Fee	Ref.
1 July 2017	MF	(England)	James Carvell	Free agent	Released	
1 July 2017	LW	(Wales)	Jake Charles	Free agent	Released	
1 July 2017	CB	(England)	Jack Cowgill	Boston United	Released	(Note: Jack Cowgill joined Boston United following his release.)
1 July 2017	LB	(England)	Callum Evans	Forest Green Rovers	Released	(Note: Callum Evans joined Forest Green Rovers following his release.)
1 July 2017	CB	(Wales)	Lewin Nyatanga	Free agent	Released	
1 July 2017	CF	(England)	Omari Patrick	Bradford City	Released	(Note: Omari Patrick joined Bradford City following his release.)
1 July 2017	CB	(England)	George Proctor	Free agent	Released	
1 July 2017	CB	(England)	Marc Roberts	Birmingham City	£3,500,000	
1 July 2017	LB	(England)	Matty Templeton	Free agent	Released	
1 July 2017	CM	(England)	Josh Scowen	Queens Park Rangers	Rejected Contract	(Note: Josh Scowen joined Queens Park Rangers after rejecting a new contract.)
1 July 2017	LB	(Republic of Ireland)	Aidy White	Free agent	Released	
1 July 2017	RW	(Wales)	Marley Watkins	Norwich City	Rejected Contract	(Note: Marley Watkins joined Norwich City after rejecting a new contract.)
1 July 2017	RM	(Australia)	Ryan Williams	Rotherham United	Released	(Note: Ryan Williams joined Rotherham United following his release.)
4 July 2017	CF	(England)	Elliot Lee	Luton Town	Released	(Note: Elliot Lee joined Luton Town following his release.)
17 July 2017	LB	(England)	Cole Kpekawa	Colchester United	Undisclosed	
21 July 2017	CF	(England)	Kayden Jackson	Accrington Stanley	Undisclosed	
18 August 2017	DM	(Benin)	Sessi D'Almeida	Blackpool	Undisclosed	
18 August 2017	CF	(England)	Stefan Payne	Shrewsbury Town	Undisclosed	
31 January 2018	CB	(England)	Angus MacDonald	Hull City	Undisclosed	

=== Loans in ===
Start date	Position	Nationality	Name	From	End date	Ref.
17 July 2017	CF	(England)	Ike Ugbo	Chelsea	3 January 2018 (Note: On 3 January 2018, Ugbo was recalled by parent club, Chelsea.)	
20 July 2017	CM	(England)	Joe Williams	Everton	30 June 2018	
11 August 2017	CM	(England)	Harvey Barnes	Leicester City	30 June 2018	
31 August 2017	CM	(England)	Gary Gardner	Aston Villa	30 June 2018	
31 August 2017	CF	(Scotland)	Oli McBurnie	Swansea City	7 September 2017 (Note: On 7 September 2017, the EFL rejected Oli McBurnie's loan at the player returned to Swansea City with immediate effect.)	
29 January 2018	WG	(England)	Connor Mahoney	Bournemouth	30 June 2018	
31 January 2018	CF	(Scotland)	Oli McBurnie	Swansea City	30 June 2018	

=== Loans out ===
Start date	Position	Nationality	Name	To	End date	Ref.
1 July 2017	CF	(England)	Brad Ash	Boreham Wood	30 June 2018	
31 August 2017	CM	(England)	Alex Mowatt	Oxford United	30 June 2018	
22 September 2017	GK	(England)	Jack Walton	Stalybridge Celtic	24 October 2017	
2 October 2017	RM	(England)	Dylan Mottley-Henry	Tranmere Rovers	2 January 2018	(Note: On 2 November, Dylan Mottley-Henry's loan at Tranmere Rovers was extended until early January.)
23 October 2017	GK	(England)	Nick Townsend	Solihull Moors	20 November 2017	
18 November 2017	CM	(England)	Josh Kay	Tranmere Rovers	18 December 2017	
4 January 2018	CM	(England)	Jared Bird	Yeovil Town	30 June 2018	
4 January 2018	CM	(England)	Josh Kay	Chesterfield	30 June 2018	
4 January 2018	CM	(England)	Cameron McGeehan	Scunthorpe United	30 June 2018	
31 January 2018	CF	(England)	Jacob Brown	Chesterfield	30 June 2018	
31 January 2018	RM	(England)	Dylan Mottley-Henry	Chesterfield	30 June 2018	

== Summary ==
Games played	43 (39 Championship, 1 FA Cup, 3 League Cup)
Games won	9 (7 Championship, 0 FA Cup, 2 League Cup)
Games drawn	13 (13 Championship, 0 FA Cup, 0 League Cup)
Games lost	21 (19 Championship, 1 FA Cup, 1 League Cup)
Goals scored	45 (38 Championship, 1 FA Cup, 6 League Cup)
Goals conceded	68 (58 Championship, 4 FA Cup, 6 League Cup)
Goal difference	−25
Clean sheets	7 (7 Championship, 0 FA Cup, 0 League Cup)
Yellow cards	66 (61 Championship, 2 FA Cup, 3 League Cup)
Red cards	3 (2 Championship, 1 FA Cup, 0 League Cup)
Worst Discipline	Joe Williams (9 (yellow card) , 1 (red card) )
Best result	3–0 vs Sunderland (26 Aug 17)
Worst result	3–0 vs Aston Villa (16 Sep 17); 3–0 vs Reading (28 Nov 17); 3–0 vs Derby County (9 Dec 17); 4–1 vs Millwall (6 Jan 18)
Most appearances	Tom Bradshaw (28 starts, 9 subs)
Top scorer	Tom Bradshaw (10)
Points	34
