= Shirley High School =

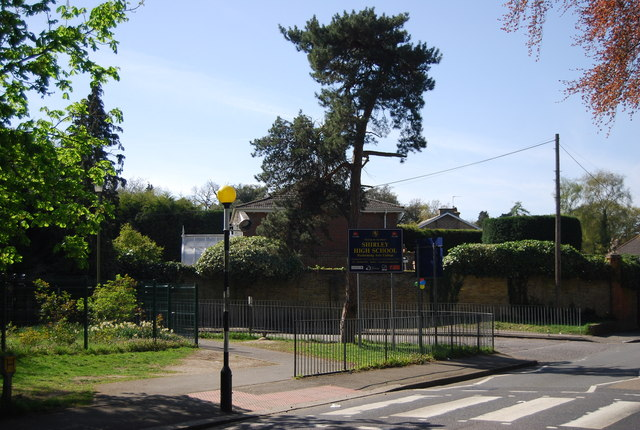

Location
- Shirley Church Road; Croydon, Greater London, CR0 5EF; England; 51°22′10″N 0°02′58″W

Information
- Type: Academy
- Motto: Striving for Excellence
- Established: 1954
- Department for Education URN: 137772 Tables
- Ofsted: Reports
- Headteacher: Tyrone Myton
- Gender: Coeducational
- Age: 11 to 18
- Enrolment: 938
- Website: http://www.shirley.croydon.sch.uk/

Shirley High School is a co-educational academy school in the London Borough of Croydon, which first opened in 1954. The school has around 1,000 pupils aged 11–18. The school was awarded specialist status as a performing arts college. The school opened a sixth form block for the 2014–2015 academic year.

== Alumni ==
- Jamal Blackman, footballer
- Ethan Pinnock, footballer
