= Adam Davies (footballer, born 1992) =

Wales international footballer

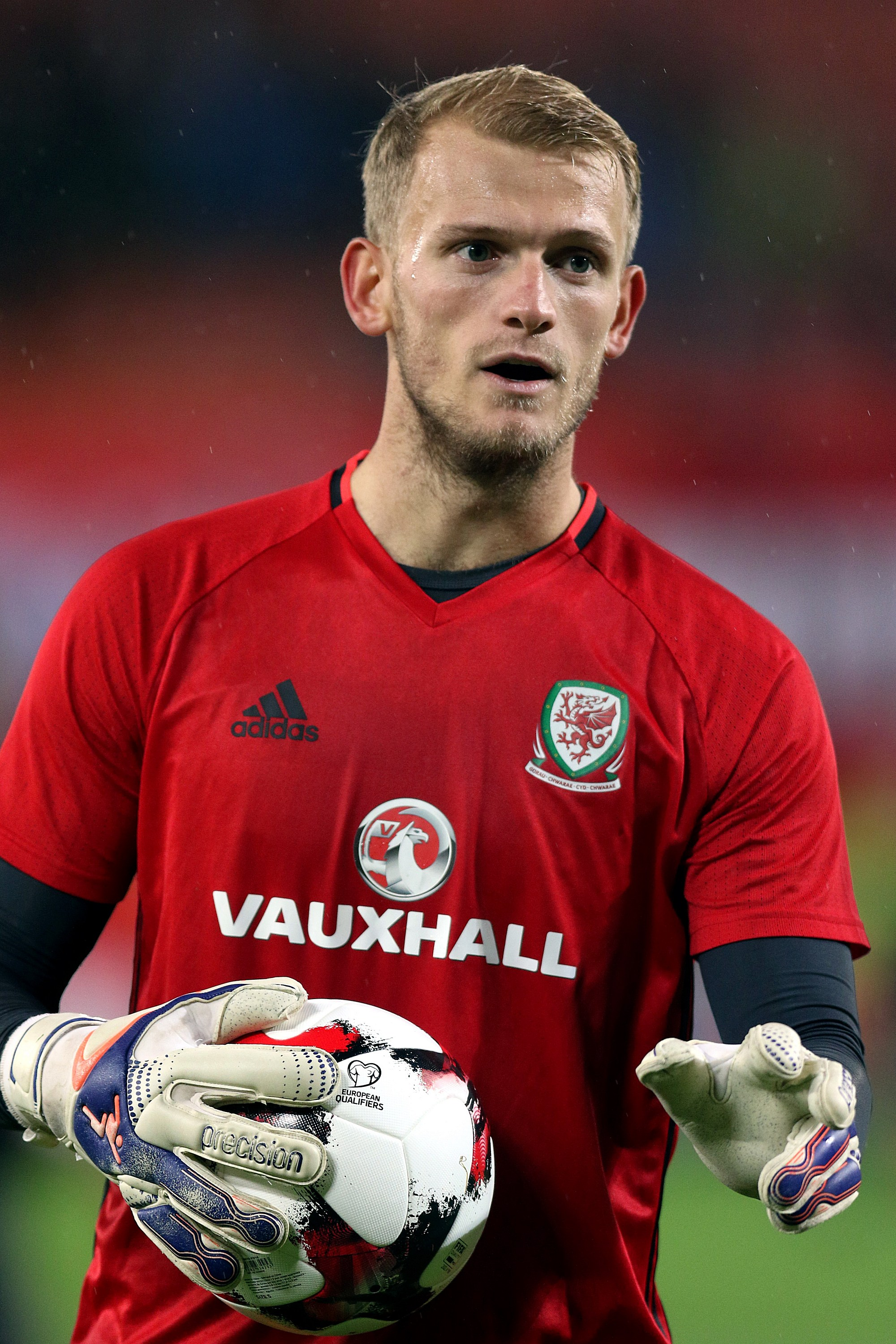
- Davies with Wales in 2016

Personal information
- Full name: Adam Rhys Davies
- Date of birth: 17 July 1992 (age 34)
- Place of birth: Rinteln, Germany
- Height: 6 ft 3 in (1.91 m)
- Position: Goalkeeper

Team information
- Current team: Sheffield United
- Number: 17

Youth career
- 2006–2012: Everton

Senior career*
Years	Team	Apps	(Gls)
2012–2014	Sheffield Wednesday	0	(0)
2014–2019	Barnsley	184	(0)
2019–2022	Stoke City	33	(0)
2022–	Sheffield United	23	(0)

International career^{‡}
2019–	Wales	6	(0)
- * Club domestic league appearances and goals as of 14:39, 2 May 2026 (UTC) ‡ National team caps and goals as of 00:00, 1 March 2026 (UTC)

Adam Rhys Davies (born 17 July 1992) is a professional footballer who plays as goalkeeper for EFL Championship club Sheffield United and the Wales national team.

Davies began his career with Sheffield Wednesday after previously playing in the Everton Academy. He did not make any appearances for Wednesday and left for Barnsley in June 2014. At Oakwell Davies experienced promotion from League One in 2015–16, relegation from the Championship in 2017–18 and promotion again in 2018–19. In June 2019 Davies joined Stoke City.

== Early life ==
Davies was born in Rinteln, Lower Saxony, with his father stationed in Germany while serving in the British Armed Forces. His family moved to Warrington, where Davies attended Great Sankey High School.

== Club career ==
=== Early career ===
Davies started his career with the Everton youth system at the age of 14. He started his scholarship with Everton in July 2008 and broke into the under-18 team during the 2008–09 season. He was named as the Academy Player of the Season for 2009–10. Davies joined the first team on a pre-season tour of the United States in July 2011 before playing regularly for the reserve team in 2011–12. He was released by Everton at the end of the season.

Davies signed for Championship club Sheffield Wednesday on 23 October 2012 on a month-to-month contract as backup to first-choice goalkeeper Chris Kirkland. He was an unused substitute for the first team on multiple occasions throughout the 2012–13 and 2013–14 seasons before being released by the club.

=== Barnsley ===
Davies signed for League One club Barnsley on 13 June 2014 on a two-year contract. He made his first-team debut on 9 August 2014 in the opening match of 2014–15, a 1–0 home defeat to Crawley Town. Davies played 25 times in 2014–15 as the Tykes were unable to mount a promotion challenge finishing in 11th. He signed a new contract with Barnsley in May 2015. Barnsley had a successful 2015–16 season as they recovered from a slow start to gain promotion via the play-offs, beating Millwall 3–1 in the 2016 Football League One play-off final. They also beat Oxford United 3–2 in the 2016 Football League Trophy Final.

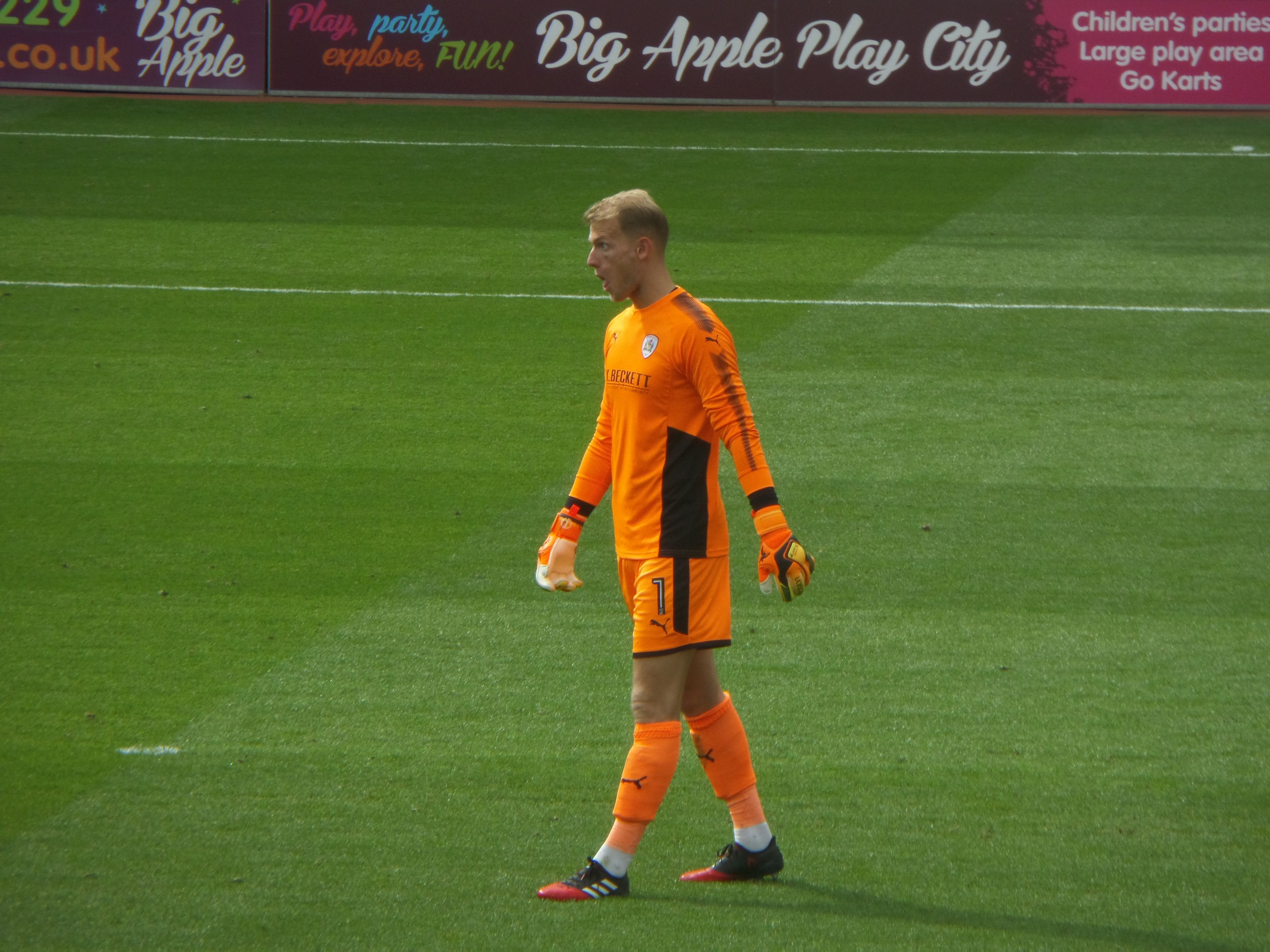
Davies in action for Barnsley in July 2017

On 26 January 2017, Davies signed a new contract with Barnsley until June 2019. Davies was an ever-present in 2016–17 helping the side finish in a safe mid-table position of 14th. He was appointed as the team's vice-captain on 3 August 2017. He was later named first team captain. Barnsley were relegated from the Championship in 2017–18.

Davies was one of the key players in Barnsley's 2018–19 season, during which the Tykes won promotion back to the Championship, starting 42 of their 46 games. He made vital contributions in crucial fixtures, most notably the away fixtures against Doncaster Rovers and Portsmouth, saving a second-half penalty in the latter. On 26 March 2019, Davies was one of four Barnsley players named in the EFL Team of the Season for League One. Davies was also named in the overall EFL Team of the Season on 8 April 2019. Davies' season was again recognised on 24 April 2019 when he was named in the PFA Team of the Year for League One along with four teammates. He was offered a new contract by Barnsley at the end of the 2018–19 season.

=== Stoke City ===
Davies signed for Championship club Stoke City on 25 June 2019 along with Barnsley teammate Liam Lindsay. He made his debut for Stoke in an FA Cup tie against Brentford on 4 January 2020. He made his Championship debut for Stoke on 12 July 2020 in a 2–0 victory against Birmingham City in place of the injured Jack Butland. Davies kept his place in the side for the final few matches of the 2019–20 season and impressed as Stoke remained unbeaten to avoid relegation from the Championship. Davies began the 2020–21 season as first-choice goalkeeper until he suffered a knee injury playing against Swansea City on 27 October 2020. Josef Bursik and Angus Gunn took Davies' place in the team until he returned from injury in March 2021. Davies made 21 appearances during the campaign as Stoke finished in 14th position.

=== Sheffield United ===
Davies joined Sheffield United on 25 January 2022 for an undisclosed fee. On 18 May 2026, the club announced it had triggered a one-year extension to his deal.

== International career ==
Davies was called up to the Wales national team on 4 October 2016 to replace the injured Danny Ward for the 2018 FIFA World Cup qualification matches against Austria and Georgia. He made his debut on 20 March 2019 in a 1–0 friendly win over Trinidad and Tobago at the Racecourse Ground in Wrexham, coming on at half time for Ward. In October 2020, Davies made his competitive debut for Wales as a 79th minute substitute, replacing the injured Wayne Hennessey in a 1–0 win away to Bulgaria. In May 2021 he was selected for the Wales squad for the delayed UEFA Euro 2020 tournament, where he was third-choice behind Ward and Hennessey. In November 2022 he was named in the Wales squad for the 2022 FIFA World Cup in Qatar.

== Career statistics ==
=== Club ===
As of match played on 25 August 2026

Appearances and goals by club, season and competition
Club	Season	League			FA Cup		League Cup		Other		Total	
Club	Season	Division	Apps	Goals	Apps	Goals	Apps	Goals	Apps	Goals	Apps	Goals
Sheffield Wednesday	2012–13	Championship	0	0	0	0	—		—		0	0
Sheffield Wednesday	2013–14	Championship	0	0	0	0	0	0	—		0	0
Sheffield Wednesday	Total		0	0	0	0	0	0	—		0	0
Barnsley	2014–15	League One	23	0	0	0	1	0	1 (Note: Appearance in Football League Trophy)	0	25	0
Barnsley	2015–16	League One	38	0	1	0	1	0	9 (Note: Six appearances in Football League Trophy, three in League One play-offs)	0	49	0
Barnsley	2016–17	Championship	46	0	2	0	1	0	—		49	0
Barnsley	2017–18	Championship	35	0	1	0	3	0	—		39	0
Barnsley	2018–19	League One	42	0	3	0	0	0	2 (Note: Appearances in EFL Trophy)	0	47	0
Barnsley	Total		184	0	7	0	6	0	12	0	209	0
Stoke City	2019–20	Championship	4	0	1	0	0	0	—		5	0
Stoke City	2020–21	Championship	17	0	0	0	4	0	—		21	0
Stoke City	2021–22	Championship	12	0	0	0	3	0	—		15	0
Stoke City	Total		33	0	1	0	7	0	—		41	0
Sheffield United	2021–22	Championship	0	0	—		—		—		0	0
Sheffield United	2022–23	Championship	7	0	3	0	0	0	—		10	0
Sheffield United	2023–24	Premier League	0	0	0	0	1	0	—		1	0
Sheffield United	2024–25	Championship	3	0	0	0	1	0	—		4	0
Sheffield United	2025–26	Championship	12	0	1	0	1	0	—		14	0
Sheffield United	2026–27	Championship	0	0	0	0	1	0	—		1	0
Sheffield United	Total		22	0	4	0	4	0	—		30	0
Career total			237	0	12	0	17	0	12	0	280	0

=== International ===
As of match played on 9 September 2025

Appearances and goals by national team and year
National team	Year	Apps	Goals
Wales	2019	1	0
Wales	2020	1	0
Wales	2021	0	0
Wales	2022	2	0
Wales	2023	0	0
Wales	2024	1	0
Wales	2025	1	0
Total		6	0

== Honours ==
Barnsley

- EFL League One runner-up: 2018–19; play-offs: 2016
- Football League Trophy: 2015–16

Individual

- PFA Team of the Year: 2018–19 League One
- EFL Team of the Season: 2018–19
- EFL League One Team of the Season: 2018–19
- Everton Academy Player of the Season: 2009–10
