= Dimitri Cavaré =

Guadeloupean footballer (born 1995)

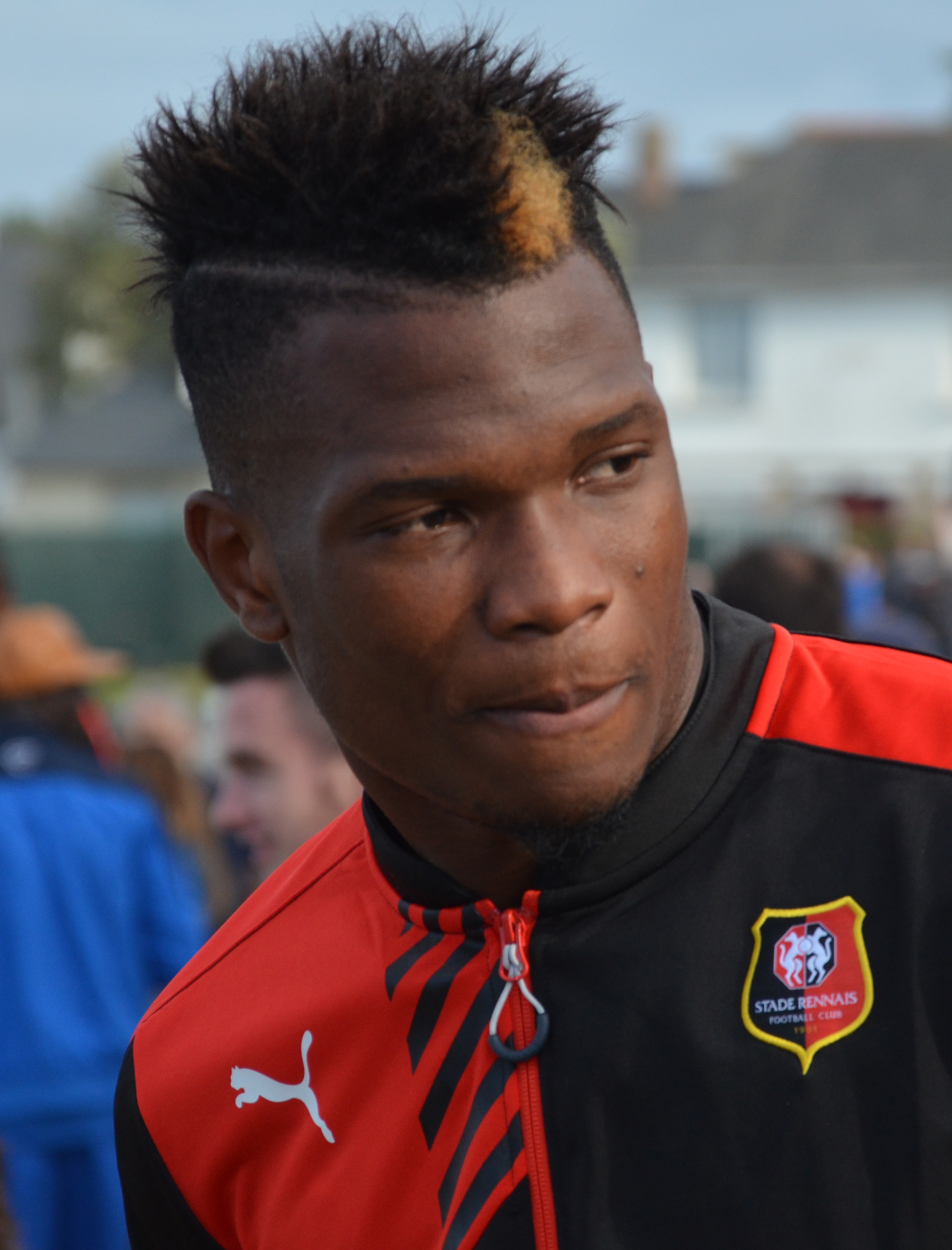
- Cavaré with Rennes in 2015

Personal information
- Full name: Dimitri Kévin Cavaré
- Date of birth: 5 February 1995 (age 31)
- Place of birth: Pointe-à-Pitre, Guadeloupe
- Height: 1.85 m (6 ft 1 in)
- Position: Right-back

Team information
- Current team: Bnei Sakhnin
- Number: 97

Youth career
- 2002–2005: AS Nénuphars
- 2005–2008: Cactus Sainte-Anne
- 2008–2010: Moulien
- 2010–2013: Lens

Senior career*
Years	Team	Apps	(Gls)
2013–2014	Lens B	23	(0)
2013–2015	Lens	21	(0)
2015–2017	Rennes	2	(0)
2016	Rennes B	12	(0)
2017–2020	Barnsley	61	(3)
2020–2023	Sion	67	(7)
2023–2025	Ümraniyespor	56	(3)
2025–2026	Esenler Erokspor	23	(0)
2026–	Bnei Sakhnin	2	(0)

International career^{‡}
2014	France U20	2	(1)
2018–	Guadeloupe	12	(0)
- * Club domestic league appearances and goals as of 17 October 2026 ‡ National team caps and goals as of 28 June 2025

Dimitri Kévin Cavaré (born 5 February 1995) is a Guadeloupean professional footballer who plays as a right-back for Israeli Premier League club Bnei Sakhnin and the Guadeloupe national team.

== Career ==
=== Lens ===
Cavaré is a product of the RC Lens academy. He made his Ligue 2 debut on 17 August 2013 in a 4–1 home win against AJ Auxerre. He came onto the field after 60 minutes for Jean-Philippe Gbamin. He proceeded to make 21 league appearances for Lens in a two-year period, but failed to score for the club.

=== Stade Rennais ===
In January 2015, Cavaré agreed to join Rennes at the end of the season. One month later, he suffered a severe ligament injury and was ruled out of action for the rest of the season. In the summer of 2015, he joined up with his new club but continued to suffer from his injury in the early stages of the 2015–16 season.

In July he went on trial to newly promoted Premier League club Huddersfield Town but failed to earn a contract.

=== Barnsley ===
On 17 August 2017, Cavaré joined Championship club Barnsley on a two-year deal. He made his debut against Sunderland on 1 January 2018. He scored his first goal for the club in a 3–1 loss at Aston Villa on 20 January 2018. He scored his second Barnsley goal in a 2–2 draw with Scunthorpe United with a curling right-footed strike into the top corner from 25 yards out, completing a 2–0 comeback from Barnsley.

His contract was extended by Barnsley at the end of the 2018–19 season.

=== FC Sion ===
On 17 February 2020, with 4 months left on his contract, Cavaré signed for Swiss side Sion for an undisclosed fee.

=== Ümraniyespor ===
On 14 September 2023, Cavaré joined Turkish side Ümraniyespor.

== International career ==
Cavaré was born in Guadeloupe, but originally represented the France U20s. He debuted for the Guadeloupe football team in a friendly 2–0 loss to French Guiana on 7 June 2018.

In June 2025, Cavaré was called up for Guadeloupe football team to the 2025 CONCACAF Gold Cup.

== Career statistics ==
As of match played 1 July 2019

Appearances and goals by club, season and competition
Club	Season	League			National Cup		League Cup		Other		Total	
Club	Season	Division	Apps	Goals	Apps	Goals	Apps	Goals	Apps	Goals	Apps	Goals
Lens II	2012–13	CFA	6	0	—		—		—		6	0
Lens II	2013–14	CFA	17	0	—		—		—		17	0
Lens II	Total		23	0	—		—		—		23	0
Lens	2013–14	Ligue 2	1	0	0	0	0	0	—		1	0
Lens	2014–15	Ligue 1	20	0	1	0	1	0	—		22	0
Lens	Total		21	0	1	0	1	0	—		23	0
Rennes II	2015–16	CFA 2	3	0	—		—		—		3	0
Rennes II	2016–17	CFA	9	0	—		—		—		9	0
Rennes II	Total		12	0	—		—		—		12	0
Rennes	2016–17	Ligue 1	2	0	1	0	2	0	—		5	0
Barnsley	2017–18	Championship	9	1	1	0	0	0	0	0	10	1
Barnsley	2018–19	League One	41	2	2	0	1	0	0	0	44	2
Barnsley	2019–20	Championship	0	0	0	0	0	0	0	0	0	0
Barnsley	Total		50	3	3	0	1	0	0	0	54	3
Career total			108	3	5	0	4	0	0	0	117	3

== Honours ==
Barnsley

- EFL League One runner-up: 2018–19

Individual

- PFA Team of the Year: 2018–19 League One
