= Jared Bird =

English footballer

Personal information
- Full name: Jared Bird
- Date of birth: 1 January 1998 (age 28)
- Place of birth: Nottingham, England
- Height: 6 ft 0 in (1.83 m)
- Position: Midfielder

Youth career
- 2014–2016: Derby County

Senior career*
Years	Team	Apps	(Gls)
2016–2020	Barnsley	3	(0)
2018	→ Yeovil Town (loan)	11	(0)
2021–2023	Ilkeston Town	27	(1)
- * Club domestic league appearances and goals as of 20:31, 2 February 2022 (UTC)

Jared Bird (born 1 January 1998) is a former English professional footballer who last played for Northern Premier League side Ilkeston Town as a midfielder.

== Career ==
=== Youth career ===
In June 2016, Bird was released by Derby County at the end of his two-year scholarship.

=== Barnsley ===
Bird signed his first professional deal in July 2016, and spent the majority of the 2016–17 season as captain of the Under-23s. He was named in the first team squad on a single occasion but didn't make an appearance.

In June 2017, Bird signed a contract extension. On 15 August 2017, Bird made his debut in a 2–1 win over Nottingham Forest. He replaced George Moncur for a 24-minute cameo appearance from the bench.

Bird was released by Barnsley at the end of the 2019–20 season.

==== Yeovil Town loan ====
On 4 January 2018, Bird joined League Two side Yeovil Town on loan until the end of the 2017–18 season.

=== Non-league ===
In October 2021, following his release from Barnsley, he signed for Northern Premier League Division One Midlands side Ilkeston Town.

== Career statistics ==
As of match played 29 January 2022.

Appearances and goals by club, season and competition
Club	Season	League			FA Cup		League Cup		Other		Total	
Club	Season	Division	Apps	Goals	Apps	Goals	Apps	Goals	Apps	Goals	Apps	Goals
Barnsley	2017–18	Championship	3	0	0	0	1	0	—		4	0
Barnsley	2018–19	League One	0	0	0	0	0	0	4 (Note: Appearances in EFL Trophy)	0	4	0
Barnsley	2019–20	Championship	0	0	0	0	0	0	—		0	0
Total			3	0	0	0	1	0	4	0	8	0
Yeovil Town (loan)	2017–18	League Two	20	0	2	0	—		3	0	16	0
Ilkeston Town	2021–22	NPL Division One Midlands	23	1	—		—		1 (Note: Appearances in FA Trophy)	0	13	1
Career total			46	1	2	0	1	0	8	0	37	1
