= Jacob Brown (footballer) =

Scottish footballer (born 1998)

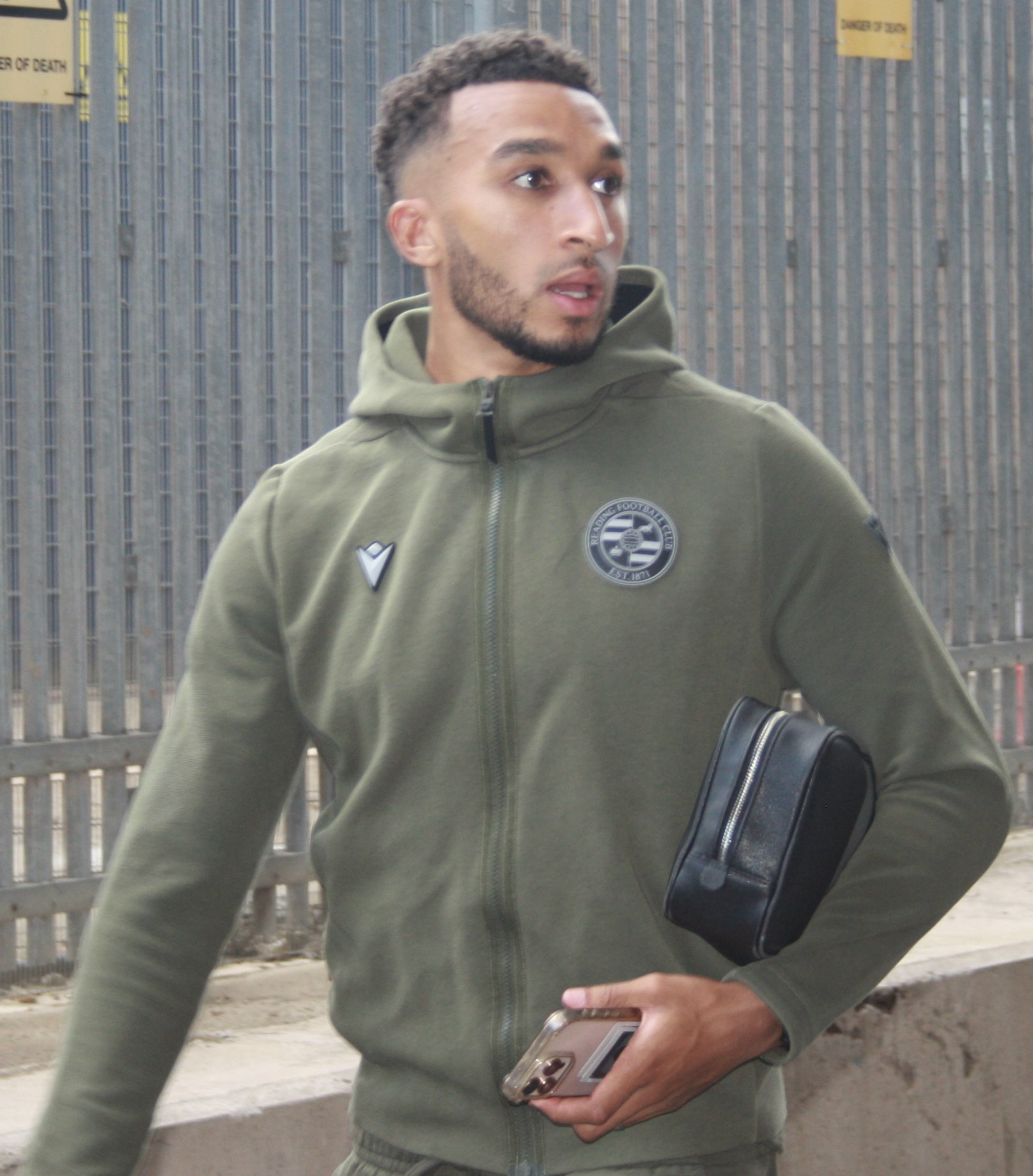
- Brown in 2026

Personal information
- Full name: Jacob Samuel Brown
- Date of birth: 10 April 1998 (age 28)
- Place of birth: Halifax, England
- Height: 1.78 m (5 ft 10 in)
- Positions: Forward; wing-back

Team information
- Current team: Reading
- Number: 18

Youth career
- 2011–2013: Sheffield Wednesday
- 2014–2015: Guiseley

Senior career*
| Years | Team | Apps | (Gls) |
| 2014–2015 | Guiseley | 0 | (0) |
| 2015–2020 | Barnsley | 74 | (11) |
| 2018 | → Chesterfield (loan) | 13 | (0) |
| 2020–2023 | Stoke City | 125 | (26) |
| 2023–2026 | Luton Town | 55 | (6) |
| 2026 | → Portsmouth (loan) | 15 | (1) |
| 2026– | Reading | 9 | (4) |

International career
| 2021–2023 | Scotland | 8 | (0) |
- * Club domestic league appearances and goals as of 21:24, 10 October 2026 (UTC)

Jacob Samuel Brown (born 10 April 1998) is a professional footballer who plays as a forward or wing-back for EFL League One club Reading.

Brown started his career with Barnsley, making his professional debut in October 2016. After spending time out on loan at Chesterfield in 2017–18, he broke into the first team at Oakwell, helping them gain promotion to the EFL Championship in 2018–19. In September 2020 he joined Stoke City for an undisclosed fee. Brown spent three seasons with Stoke before joining Luton Town in August 2023. He was released by the club in June 2026. He then joined Reading on a free transfer in July 2026.

Born and raised in England, Brown was selected by the Scotland national team in November 2021, being eligible via his Glaswegian mother.

== Club career ==
=== Barnsley ===
Brown began his career at the Sheffield Wednesday Academy where he was released at the age of 14. He signed for Guiseley at the age of 16 and played in his first senior match against Selby Town in the West Riding County Cup in October 2014. Brown moved to Barnsley in January 2015 after impressing playing against them in an under-18 match. Brown made his debut for Barnsley against Brentford on 22 October 2016, coming on as a late substitute. After spending the first half of the 2017–18 season with Barnsley under-23s, Brown joined EFL League Two club Chesterfield on a six-month loan on 31 January 2018. Brown played 13 times for the Spireites in 2017–18 and was unable to help them avoid relegation to the National League.

Brown broke into the first team at Oakwell in 2018–19 under Daniel Stendel and impressed playing as a winger and won the EFL Young Player of the Month award for January 2019. He signed a new contract in December 2018. He was sent-off for the first time in his career against Southend United on 2 March 2019. Brown played 38 times in 2018–19, scoring eight goals as the Tykes gained promotion back to the EFL Championship. Brown signed a contract extension with Barnsley in May 2019. In 2019–20, Brown provided nine assists as Barnsley battled against relegation to EFL League One and stayed up after winning their final two matches against Nottingham Forest and Brentford.

=== Stoke City ===
Brown joined Stoke City on 9 September 2020 for an undisclosed fee. He scored his first goal for Stoke in a 1–0 EFL Cup win against Wolverhampton Wanderers on 17 September 2020, and his first league goal in a 3–0 win against Reading in November. Brown scored six goals in 46 appearances during the 2020–21 season, as Stoke City finished in 14th position. He scored on the opening day of the 2021–22 season in a 3–2 win against Reading. Stoke City began the season in good form and were in play-off contention at the turn of the year but a poor second half saw the team slip down into mid-table. Brown was top scorer with 14 goals which earned him a new three-year contract and saw him named Player of the Year. In the 2022–23 season, Brown scored nine goals in 42 appearances as Stoke City finished in 16th. He missed the last few matches of the campaign after sustaining a hamstring injury.

=== Luton Town ===
Brown joined newly promoted Premier League side Luton Town on 10 August 2023 for an undisclosed fee. On 29 August 2023, Brown scored his first goal for the club in a 3–2 victory over Gillingham in the EFL Cup. On 25 November 2023, Brown scored his first league goal for Luton Town and the winning goal against Crystal Palace in a 2–1 win at Kenilworth Road, the club's first home Premier League victory.

==== Portsmouth (loan) ====
On 2 February 2026, Brown joined Championship club Portsmouth on loan until the end of the 2025–26 season.

On 8 May 2026, Luton Town said the player would leave in the summer once his contract had expired on 30 June 2026 alongside former team-mates Zack Nelson, Cohen Bramall and Elijah Adebayo.

=== Reading ===
On 2 July 2026, Brown signed a two-year deal with EFL League One club Reading.

== International career ==
Brown was eligible to play international football for both England and Scotland, being eligible for the latter through his Glasgow-born mother. In November 2021, Brown was selected by Scotland for World Cup qualifying matches against Moldova and Denmark. Brown made his senior international debut for Scotland on 12 November 2021, appearing as a late substitute in a 2–0 win against Moldova.

== Career statistics ==
=== Club ===
As of match played 10 October 2026

Appearances and goals by club, season and competition
| Club | Season | League | | | FA Cup | | EFL Cup | | Other | | Total | |
| Club | Season | Division | Apps | Goals | Apps | Goals | Apps | Goals | Apps | Goals | Apps | Goals |
|---|---|---|---|---|---|---|---|---|---|---|---|---|
| Guiseley | 2014–15 | Conference North | 0 | 0 | 0 | 0 | — | | 1 (Note: Appearance in West Riding County Cup) | 0 | 1 | 0 |
| Barnsley | 2015–16 | League One | 0 | 0 | 0 | 0 | 0 | 0 | — | | 0 | 0 |
| Barnsley | 2016–17 | Championship | 2 | 0 | 0 | 0 | 0 | 0 | — | | 2 | 0 |
| Barnsley | 2017–18 | Championship | 0 | 0 | 0 | 0 | 0 | 0 | — | | 0 | 0 |
| Barnsley | 2018–19 | League One | 32 | 8 | 2 | 0 | 0 | 0 | 4 (Note: Appearances in EFL Trophy) | 0 | 38 | 8 |
| Barnsley | 2019–20 | Championship | 40 | 3 | 2 | 1 | 0 | 0 | — | | 42 | 4 |
| Barnsley | Total | | 74 | 11 | 4 | 1 | 0 | 0 | 4 | 0 | 82 | 12 |
| Chesterfield (loan) | 2017–18 | League Two | 13 | 0 | 0 | 0 | 0 | 0 | 0 | 0 | 13 | 0 |
| Stoke City | 2020–21 | Championship | 41 | 5 | 1 | 0 | 4 | 1 | — | | 46 | 6 |
| Stoke City | 2021–22 | Championship | 45 | 13 | 3 | 1 | 4 | 0 | — | | 52 | 14 |
| Stoke City | 2022–23 | Championship | 38 | 7 | 3 | 2 | 1 | 0 | — | | 42 | 9 |
| Stoke City | 2023–24 | Championship | 1 | 1 | 0 | 0 | 0 | 0 | — | | 1 | 1 |
| Stoke City | Total | | 125 | 26 | 7 | 3 | 9 | 1 | 0 | 0 | 141 | 30 |
| Luton Town | 2023–24 | Premier League | 19 | 2 | 1 | 0 | 2 | 1 | — | | 22 | 3 |
| Luton Town | 2024–25 | Championship | 29 | 4 | 1 | 0 | 0 | 0 | — | | 30 | 4 |
| Luton Town | 2025–26 | League One | 7 | 0 | 1 | 0 | 0 | 0 | 0 | 0 | 8 | 0 |
| Luton Town | Total | | 55 | 6 | 2 | 0 | 2 | 1 | 0 | 0 | 60 | 7 |
| Portsmouth (loan) | 2025–26 | Championship | 15 | 1 | 0 | 0 | 0 | 0 | – | | 15 | 1 |
| Reading | 2026–27 | League One | 9 | 4 | 0 | 0 | 3 | 1 | 1 | 0 | 13 | 5 |
| Career total | | | 291 | 48 | 13 | 4 | 14 | 3 | 6 | 0 | 325 | 55 |

=== International ===
As of match played 19 November 2023

Appearances and goals by national team and year
| National team | Year | Apps | Goals |
|---|---|---|---|
| Scotland | 2021 | 1 | 0 |
| Scotland | 2022 | 5 | 0 |
| Scotland | 2023 | 2 | 0 |
| Total | | 8 | 0 |

== Honours ==
Barnsley

- EFL League One runner-up: 2018–19

Individual

- EFL Young Player of the Month: January 2019
- Stoke City Player of the Year: 2022

== See also ==
- List of Scotland international footballers born outside Scotland
