= 2018–19 Barnsley F.C. season =

Barnsley F.C. season

Barnsley
2018–19 season
- Owner: International Investment Consortium (80%); James Cryne/The Cryne Family (20%)
- Chairman: Chien Lee (co-chairman); Paul Conway (co-chairman)
- Head Coach: Daniel Stendel
- Stadium: Oakwell
- League One: 2nd (promoted to EFL Championship)
- FA Cup: Third round
- EFL Cup: First round
- EFL Trophy: Second round
- Top goalscorer: League: Kieffer Moore (15); All: Kieffer Moore (17)
- Highest home attendance: 18,282 vs. Sunderland, League One, 12 March 2019
- Lowest home attendance: 2,300 vs. Everton U21, EFL Trophy group stage, 6 November 2018
- Average home league attendance: 12,527
Home colours	Away colours	Third colours

The 2018–19 season saw Barnsley playing in the EFL League One. The season covered the period from 1 July 2018 to 30 June 2019.

On 30 April 2019, it was confirmed that Barnsley F.C was promoted to EFL Championship, will play in the 2019–20 EFL Championship season.

== Squad ==
As of 18 August 2018

No.	Name	Pos.	Nat.	Place of Birth	Age	Apps	Goals	Signed from	Date signed	Fee	Contract End
Goalkeepers
1	Adam Davies (captain)	GK	(Wales) (Germany)	Rinteln	34	209	0	Sheffield Wednesday	13 June 2014	Free	2019
13	Jack Walton	GK	(England)	Bury	28	9	0	Academy	1 July 2015	Trainee	2021
Defenders
3	Zeki Fryers	LB	(England)	Manchester	33	31	2	Crystal Palace	1 July 2017	Free	2020
5	Ethan Pinnock	CB	(England)	London	33	67	3	Forest Green Rovers	30 June 2017	£513,000	2020
6	Liam Lindsay	CB	(Scotland)	Paisley	30	90	3	Partick Thistle	1 July 2017	£360,000	2020
12	Dimitri Cavaré	RB	(Guadeloupe) (France)	Pointe-à-Pitre	31	54	3	Rennes	17 August 2017	Undisclosed	2019
18	Adam Jackson	CB	(England)	Darlington	32	44	2	Middlesbrough	30 August 2016	Undisclosed	2019
22	Jordan Williams	RB	(England)	Huddersfield	26	15	1	Huddersfield Town	8 August 2018	Undisclosed	2022
23	Daniel Pinillos	LB	(Spain)	Logroño	33	47	0	Córdoba	19 January 2018	Undisclosed	2020
28	Ben Williams	LB	(Wales)		27	15	0	Blackburn Rovers	1 July 2017	Free	2020
Midfielders
4	Kenneth Dougall	DM	(Australia)	Brisbane	33	29	0	Sparta Rotterdam	27 July 2018	Undisclosed	2020
7	Ryan Hedges	RM/LM	(Wales) (England)	Northampton	31	59	4	Swansea City	31 January 2017	Undisclosed	2019
8	Cameron McGeehan	CM	(England)	Kingston upon Thames	31	54	7	Luton Town	23 June 2017	£990,000	2020
14	Jared Bird	CM	(England)	Nottingham	29	8	0	Academy	1 July 2017	Trainee	2020
17	Dylan Mottley-Henry	WG	(England)	Leeds	29	1	0	Bradford City	12 July 2016	Free	2020
20	Callum Styles	AM	(England)	Bury	26	7	0	Bury	6 August 2018	Undisclosed	2022
21	Mike-Steven Bähre	CM	(Germany)	Garbsen	31	41	2	Hannover 96	31 August 2018	Loan	2019
27	Alex Mowatt	CM	(England)	Doncaster	31	64	9	Leeds United	31 January 2017	£600,000	2020
Forwards
9	Cauley Woodrow	CF	(England)	Hemel Hempstead	31	36	19	Fulham	3 January 2019	Undisclosed	2021
15	Jordan Green	RW/CF	(England)	New Cross	31	10	1	Yeovil Town	18 January 2018	Undisclosed	2021
19	Kieffer Moore	ST	(England)	Torquay	34	55	23	Ipswich Town	8 January 2018	£765,000	2021
26	Mamadou Thiam	ST	(Senegal)	Aubervilliers	31	83	8	Dijon	11 August 2017	£900,000	2020
29	Victor Adeboyejo	ST	(Nigeria)	Ibadan	28	31	4	Leyton Orient	4 November 2017	Free	2021
33	Jacob Brown	ST	(England)	Halifax	27	40	8	Academy	1 July 2016	Trainee	2021
Out on Loan
11	Lloyd Isgrove	RM	(Wales) (England)	Yeovil	33	59	2	Free agent	2 July 2017	Free	2020
	George Miller	CF	(England)	Bolton	28	0	0	Middlesbrough	31 January 2019	£200,000	2022

Appearances and goals correct as of 16 May 2019.

== Statistics ==
As of 4 May 2019

No.	Pos	Nat	Player	Total		League One		FA Cup		League Cup		League Trophy	
No.	Pos	Nat	Player	Apps	Goals	Apps	Goals	Apps	Goals	Apps	Goals	Apps	Goals
1	GK	(Wales) WAL	Adam Davies	46	0	41+0	0	3+0	0	0+0	0	2+0	0
3	DF	(England) ENG	Zeki Fryers	8	1	3+2	0	2+0	1	0+0	0	1+0	0
4	MF	(Australia) AUS	Kenneth Dougall	28	0	19+7	0	0+1	0	1+0	0	0+0	0
5	DF	(England) ENG	Ethan Pinnock	51	1	45+0	1	3+0	0	1+0	0	1+1	0
6	DF	(Scotland) SCO	Liam Lindsay	44	2	39+0	1	3+0	0	0+0	0	2+0	1
7	MF	(Wales) WAL	Ryan Hedges	24	1	4+16	0	1+1	0	0+0	0	2+0	1
8	MF	(England) ENG	Cameron McGeehan	43	6	31+7	6	3+0	0	1+0	0	1+0	0
9	FW	(England) ENG	Cauley Woodrow	35	19	28+2	16	3+0	3	0+0	0	2+0	0
12	DF	(Guadeloupe) GLP	Dimitri Cavaré	43	2	39+1	2	2+0	0	1+0	0	0+0	0
13	GK	(England) ENG	Jack Walton	6	0	3+0	0	0+0	0	1+0	0	2+0	0
14	MF	(England) ENG	Jared Bird	4	0	0+0	0	0+0	0	0+0	0	4+0	0
15	FW	(England) ENG	Jordan Green	10	1	2+8	1	0+0	0	0+0	0	0+0	0
18	DF	(England) ENG	Adam Jackson	11	0	6+1	0	0+0	0	1+0	0	3+0	0
19	FW	(England) ENG	Kieffer Moore	34	19	26+5	17	2+0	2	0+0	0	0+1	0
20	MF	(England) ENG	Callum Styles	7	0	0+7	0	0+0	0	0+0	0	0+0	0
21	MF	(Germany) GER	Mike-Steven Bähre	41	2	22+12	1	2+1	1	0+0	0	3+1	0
22	DF	(England) ENG	Jordan Williams	15	1	6+5	0	0+0	0	0+0	0	4+0	1
23	DF	(Spain) ESP	Daniel Pinillos	38	0	31+3	0	0+1	0	1+0	0	2+0	0
26	FW	(Senegal) SEN	Mamadou Thiam	51	7	36+9	7	2+0	0	0+1	0	1+2	0
27	MF	(England) ENG	Alex Mowatt	45	7	40+0	7	3+0	0	0+1	0	0+1	0
28	DF	(Wales) WAL	Ben Williams	15	0	11+0	0	1+0	0	0+0	0	3+0	0
29	FW	(Nigeria) NGA	Victor Adeboyejo	29	5	1+22	3	0+1	0	1+0	0	4+0	2
33	FW	(England) ENG	Jacob Brown	38	8	21+11	8	1+1	0	0+0	0	3+1	0
38	DF	(England) ENG	Jordan Helliwell	1	0	0+0	0	0+0	0	0+0	0	0+1	0
43	GK	(England) ENG	Jordan Smith	1	0	1+0	0	0+0	0	0+0	0	0+0	0
Players on loan:
11	MF	(Wales) WAL	Lloyd Isgrove	6	0	0+2	0	0+0	0	1+0	0	1+2	0
32	DF	(England) ENG	Will Smith	1	0	0+0	0	0+0	0	0+0	0	0+1	0
Players who left during the season:
9	FW	(Wales) WAL	Tom Bradshaw	5	1	4+0	1	0+0	0	1+0	0	0+0	0
10	MF	(England) ENG	George Moncur	27	5	10+11	1	1+1	0	1+0	1	1+2	3
20	MF	(England) ENG	Brad Potts	25	7	20+2	6	1+1	1	0+0	0	1+0	0

=== Goals record ===
As of 4 May 2019

Rank	No.	Nat.	Po.	Name	League One	FA Cup	League Cup	League Trophy	Total
1	9	(England)	CF	Cauley Woodrow	16	3	0	0	19
1	19	(England)	CF	Kieffer Moore	17	2	0	0	19
3	33	(England)	CF	Jacob Brown	8	0	0	0	8
4	~~20~~	(England)	CM	Brad Potts	6	1	0	0	7
4	26	(Senegal)	CF	Mamadou Thiam	7	0	0	0	7
4	27	(England)	CM	Alex Mowatt	7	0	0	0	7
7	8	(England)	CM	Cameron McGeehan	6	0	0	0	6
8	~~10~~	(England)	CM	George Moncur	1	0	1	3	5
8	29	(Nigeria)	CF	Victor Adeboyejo	3	0	0	2	5
10	6	(Scotland)	CB	Liam Lindsay	1	0	0	1	2
10	12	(Guadeloupe)	RB	Dimitri Cavaré	2	0	0	0	2
10	21	(Germany)	CM	Mike-Steven Bähre	1	1	0	0	2
13	3	(England)	LB	Zeki Fryers	0	1	0	0	1
13	5	(England)	CB	Ethan Pinnock	1	0	0	0	1
13	7	(Wales)	RM	Ryan Hedges	0	0	0	1	1
13	~~9~~	(Wales)	CF	Tom Bradshaw	1	0	0	0	1
13	15	(England)	LW	Jordan Green	1	0	0	0	1
13	22	(England)	RB	Jordan Williams	0	0	0	1	1
Total					77	8	1	8	95

=== Disciplinary record ===
As of 4 May 2019

Rank	No.	Nat.	Po.	Name	League One			FA Cup			League Cup			League Trophy			Total		
Rank	No.	Nat.	Po.	Name	Booked	(yellow card) (yellow-red card)	Sent off (straight red)	Booked	(yellow card) (yellow-red card)	Sent off (straight red)	Booked	(yellow card) (yellow-red card)	Sent off (straight red)	Booked	(yellow card) (yellow-red card)	Sent off (straight red)	Booked	(yellow card) (yellow-red card)	Sent off (straight red)
1	6	(England)	CB	Liam Lindsay	10	1	0	1	0	0	0	0	0	1	0	0	12	1	0
2	27	(England)	CM	Alex Mowatt	9	0	0	0	0	0	0	0	0	1	0	0	10	0	0
3	8	(England)	CM	Cameron McGeehan	9	0	0	0	0	0	0	0	0	0	0	0	9	0	0
4	4	(Australia)	CM	Kenneth Dougall	7	0	0	0	0	0	1	0	0	0	0	0	8	0	0
4	23	(Spain)	LB	Daniel Pinillos	8	0	0	0	0	0	0	0	0	0	0	0	8	0	0
6	12	(Guadeloupe)	RB	Dimitri Cavaré	6	0	0	0	0	0	0	0	0	0	0	0	6	0	0
33	(England)	CF	Jacob Brown	5	0	1	0	0	0	0	0	0	0	0	0	5	0	1	
8	5	(England)	CB	Ethan Pinnock	5	0	0	0	0	0	0	0	0	0	0	0	5	0	0
9	9	(England)	CF	Cauley Woodrow	4	0	0	0	0	0	0	0	0	0	0	0	4	0	0
9	21	(Germany)	CM	Mike-Steven Bähre	4	0	0	0	0	0	0	0	0	0	0	0	4	0	0
9	28	(Wales)	LB	Ben Williams	3	0	0	1	0	0	0	0	0	0	0	0	4	0	0
12	3	(England)	LB	Zeki Fryers	0	1	0	1	0	0	0	0	0	0	0	0	1	1	0
12	7	(Wales)	RM	Ryan Hedges	2	0	0	1	0	0	0	0	0	0	0	0	3	0	0
12	~~10~~	(England)	AM	George Moncur	3	0	0	0	0	0	0	0	0	0	0	0	3	0	0
12	18	(England)	CB	Adam Jackson	0	0	0	0	0	0	0	0	0	1	1	0	1	1	0
16	1	(Wales)	GK	Adam Davies	2	0	0	0	0	0	0	0	0	0	0	0	2	0	0
16	12	(Guadeloupe)	RB	Dimitri Cavaré	2	0	0	0	0	0	0	0	0	0	0	0	2	0	0
16	19	(England)	CF	Kieffer Moore	2	0	0	0	0	0	0	0	0	0	0	0	2	0	0
19	13	(England)	GK	Jack Walton	0	0	0	0	0	0	1	0	0	0	0	0	1	0	0
19	15	(England)	LW	Jordan Green	1	0	0	0	0	0	0	0	0	0	0	0	1	0	0
19	26	(Senegal)	CF	Mamadou Thiam	1	0	0	0	0	0	0	0	0	0	0	0	1	0	0
19	28	(Wales)	LB	Ben Williams	1	0	0	0	0	0	0	0	0	0	0	0	1	0	0
19	29	(Nigeria)	CF	Victor Adeboyejo	0	0	0	0	0	0	0	0	0	1	0	0	1	0	0
Total					82	2	1	4	0	0	2	0	0	4	1	0	91	3	1

=== Contracts ===
Date	Position	Nationality	Name	Status	Contract Length	Expiry Date	Ref.
2 July 2018	GK	(England)	Jack Walton	Signed	3 years	June 2021	
4 July 2018	LB	(Wales)	Ben Williams	Signed	2 years	June 2020	
5 July 2018	CM	(England)	Romal Palmer	Signed	1 year	June 2019	
5 July 2018	CB	(England)	Will Smith	Signed	1 year	June 2019	
5 July 2018	RB	(England)	Louis Wardle	Signed	1 year	June 2019	
9 July 2018	WG	(Israel)	Amir Berkovits	Signed	1 year	June 2019	

== Competitions ==
=== Pre-season friendlies ===
Barnsley announced pre-season friendlies against Gainsborough Trinity, York City, Salford City, West Brom Albion and Hull City.

7 July 2018 Friendly	Gainsborough Trinity	0–2	Barnsley	Gainsborough
12:00 BST		Report	Bradshaw 10', 34'	Stadium: The Gainsborough Martin & Co Arena

10 July 2018 Friendly	York City	1–7	Barnsley	York
19:00 BST	Wright 20'	Report	Bradshaw 37'; Potts 39'; Moore 40'; Adeboyejo 58'; Moncur 73'; Thiam 78'; Mottley-Henry 81'	Stadium: Bootham Crescent

14 July 2018 Friendly	Salford City	0–1	Barnsley	Salford
15:00 BST		Report	Hedges 30'	Stadium: The Peninsula Stadium

20 July 2018 Friendly	Budaörsi SC	1–1	Barnsley	Budaörs, Hungary
14:00 BST		Report	Moncur	Stadium: Árok utcai pálya

24 July 2018 Friendly	Barnsley	2–3	West Bromwich Albion	Barnsley
19:30 BST	Isgrove 6'; Moore 11'	Report	Robson-Kanu 44'; Morrison 46'; Cavaré 51' (o.g.)	Stadium: Oakwell Stadium

28 July 2018 Friendly	Barnsley	1–1	Hull City	Barnsley
15:00 BST	Dougall 3'	Report	Bowen 33'	Stadium: Oakwell Stadium

=== League One ===
==== League table ====
Pos	Team	Pld	W	D	L	GF	GA	GD	Pts	Promotion, qualification or relegation
1	Luton Town (C, P)	46	27	13	6	90	42	+48	94	Promotion to the EFL Championship
2	Barnsley (P)	46	26	13	7	80	39	+41	91	Promotion to the EFL Championship
3	Charlton Athletic (O, P)	46	26	10	10	73	40	+33	88	Qualification for League One play-offs (Note: Four teams play for one spot and promotion to the EFL Championship.)
4	Portsmouth	46	25	13	8	83	51	+32	88	Qualification for League One play-offs
5	Sunderland	46	22	19	5	80	47	+33	85	Qualification for League One play-offs

Source: EFL Official Website
Rules for classification: 1) Points; 2) Goal difference; 3) Number of goals scored; 4) Head-to-head results
(C) Champions; (O) Play-off winners; (P) Promoted

==== Result summary ====
Overall								Home						Away					
Pld	W	D	L	GF	GA	GD	Pts	W	D	L	GF	GA	GD	W	D	L	GF	GA	GD
46	26	13	7	80	39	+41	91	15	8	0	40	16	+24	11	5	7	40	23	+17

Last updated: 4 May 2019.
Source: Statto.com

==== Results by matchday ====
Matchday	1	2	3	4	5	6	7	8	9	10	11	12	13	14	15	16	17	18	19	20	21	22	23	24	25	26	27	28	29	30	31	32	33	34	35	36	37	38	39	40	41	42	43	44	45	46
Ground	H	A	H	A	A	H	H	A	A	H	A	H	A	A	H	H	A	H	A	A	H	A	H	H	A	H	A	H	A	H	A	H	H	A	A	H	H	A	A	H	A	H	H	A	H	A
Result	W	W	D	W	D	W	D	L	W	D	W	W	L	L	W	W	W	D	L	L	D	W	W	W	D	W	W	W	D	W	W	W	D	D	W	W	D	D	W	D	L	W	W	W	W	L
Position	1	1	3	3	5	3	3	3	5	6	4	3	5	5	4	4	3	3	5	5	7	6	5	4	4	5	5	3	3	2	2	2	2	2	2	2	2	2	2	2	2	2	2	2	2	2

Updated to match(es) played on 22 April 2019. Source: Statto.com
A = Away; H = Home; W = Win; D = Draw; L = Loss

==== Matches ====
On 21 June 2018, the EFL League One fixtures for the forthcoming season were announced.

4 August 2018 1	Barnsley	4–0	Oxford United	Barnsley
15:00 BST	Thiam 20', 29'; Potts 77'; Adeboyejo 89'	Report		Stadium: Oakwell; Attendance: 12,820; Referee: Ross Joyce

11 August 2018 2	Bradford City	0–2	Barnsley	Bradford
15:00 BST	O'Connor (yellow card) 37'	Report	Adeboyejo 70'; Pinillos (yellow card) 78'; Cavaré (yellow card) 90+6'	Stadium: Valley Parade; Attendance: 18,986; Referee: Tim Robinson

18 August 2018 3	Barnsley	0–0	AFC Wimbledon	Barnsley
15:00 BST		Report		Stadium: Oakwell; Attendance: 11,607; Referee: Martin Coy

21 August 2018 4	Rochdale	0–4	Barnsley	Rochdale
19:45 BST		Report	Potts 35'; Dougall (yellow card) 41'; Moore 42', 48', 68'	Stadium: Spotland Stadium; Attendance: 4,539; Referee: Michael Salisbury

25 August 2018 5	Scunthorpe United	2–2	Barnsley	Scunthorpe
15:00 BST	Morris 9' (pen.); Burgess 51'	Report	Moore 59'; Cavaré 69'	Stadium: Glanford Park; Attendance: 5,579; Referee: Nick Kinseley

1 September 2018 6	Barnsley	2–1	Gillingham	Barnsley
15:00 BST	Moore 13', 34' (pen.)	Report	Reilly (yellow card) 46'; Parker 61'	Stadium: Oakwell; Attendance: 11,434; Referee: John Busby

8 September 2018 7	Barnsley	1–1	Walsall	Barnsley
15:00 BST	Adeboyeji 55'	Report	Osbourne (yellow card) 62'; Cook 88'; Morris (yellow card) 90+3'	Stadium: Oakwell; Attendance: 11,468; Referee: Craig Hicks

15 September 2018 8	Coventry City	1–0	Barnsley	Coventry
15:00 BST	Willis 80'	Report		Stadium: Ricoh Arena; Attendance: 11,465; Referee: Trevor Kettle

22 September 2018 P	Barnsley	P–P	Burton Albion	Barnsley
15:00 BST		Report		Stadium: Oakwell
Note: Postponed prior to kick-off due to matchday volunteer suffering a Cardiac arrest.

29 September 2018 9	Fleetwood Town	1–3	Barnsley	Fleetwood
15:00 BST	Biggins 19'	Report	Brown 32'; Moore 41'; Thiam 90+3'	Stadium: Highbury Stadium; Attendance: 3,756; Referee: Martin Coy

2 October 2018 10	Barnsley	1–1	Plymouth Argyle	Barnsley
19:45 BST	Mowatt 8'	Report	Lameiras 39'	Stadium: Oakwell; Attendance: 10,717; Referee: Carl Boyeson

6 October 2018 11	Peterborough United	0–4	Barnsley	Peterborough
15:00 BST	Toney (yellow card) 43'; Bennett (yellow card) 54'; Reed (yellow card) 86'	Report	Moncur 14'; Potts 45+1', 59'; Cavaré (yellow card) 62'; Lindsay (yellow card) 88'; Brown 90+2'	Stadium: London Road Stadium; Attendance: 7,683; Referee: Darren Drysdale

13 October 2018 12	Barnsley	3–2	Luton Town	Barnsley
12:00 BST	Potts 5'; McGeehan 26'; Thiam 79'	Report	Collins 45+3' (pen.), 86'	Stadium: Oakwell; Attendance: 12,688; Referee: Ross Joyce

20 October 2018 13	Charlton Athletic	2–0	Barnsley	Charlton
15:00 BST	Grant 8', 52'; Solly (yellow card) 20'; Bielik (yellow card) 63'	Report	Pinillos (yellow card) 12'	Stadium: The Valley; Attendance: 12,416; Referee: James Linington

23 October 2018 14	Shrewsbury Town	3–1	Barnsley	Shrewsbury
19:45 BST	Docherty 2'; Norburn 23'; Waterfall 68'	Report	Pinnock 49'	Stadium: New Meadow; Attendance: 5,587; Referee: Scott Oldham

27 October 2018 15	Barnsley	1–0	Bristol Rovers	Barnsley
15:00 BST	Mowatt 11', (yellow card) 45'; Moncur (yellow card) 39'; Davies (yellow card) 90'	Report	Kelly (yellow card) 79'	Stadium: Oakwell; Attendance: 10,966; Referee: Anthony Backhouse

3 November 2018 16	Barnsley	1–0	Southend United	Barnsley
15:00 GMT	Moore 87'	Report		Stadium: Oakwell; Attendance: 10,709; Referee: Brett Huxtable

17 November 2018 17	Accrington Stanley	0–2	Barnsley	Accrington
15:00 GMT		Report	Woodrow 36'; Fryers (red card) 64'; Moore 90+4'	Stadium: Crown Ground; Attendance: 4,801; Referee: John Busby

24 November 2018 18	Barnsley	1–1	Doncaster Rovers	Barnsley
15:00 GMT	Woodrow 62'; Cavaré (yellow card) 90+4'	Report	Kane (yellow card) 47' (goal) 52'	Stadium: Oakwell; Attendance: 13,573; Referee: Michael Salisbury

27 November 2018 19	Sunderland	4–2	Barnsley	Sunderland
19:45 GMT	McGeady 19' (pen.); Maja 20'; Gooch 32'; O'Nien 83'	Report	Moore 41', 61'	Stadium: Stadium of Light; Attendance: 28,514; Referee: Andrew Madley

8 December 2018 20	Wycombe Wanderers	1–0	Barnsley	High Wycombe
15:00 GMT	Williams 55'	Report	Moncur (yellow card) 30'; McGeehan (yellow card) 86'	Stadium: Adams Park; Attendance: 5,225; Referee: Anthony Giggins

15 December 2018 21	Barnsley	1–1	Portsmouth	Barnsley
15:00 GMT	McGeehan (yellow card) 17'; Woodrow (yellow card) 41', (goal) 61'	Report	Naylor (yellow card) 20'; Evans 43'; Curtis (yellow card) 69'; Brown (yellow card) 90+3'	Stadium: Oakwell; Attendance: 12,441; Referee: Jon Moss

22 December 2018 22	Blackpool	0–1	Barnsley	Blackpool
15:00 GMT	Heneghan (yellow card) 81'	Report	McGeehan 59'; Mowatt (yellow card) 75'; Lindsay (yellow card) 78'; Bähre (yellow card) 90+1'; Moore (yellow card) 90+5'	Stadium: Bloomfield Road; Attendance: 4,054; Referee: Anthony Backhouse

26 December 2018 23	Barnsley	2–0	Peterborough United	Barnsley
15:00 GMT	Mowatt 24'; Woodrow 49'; Dougall (yellow card) 85'	Report	Toney (yellow card) 68'	Stadium: Oakwell; Attendance: 12,843; Referee: Carl Boyeson

29 December 2018 24	Barnsley	2–1	Charlton Athletic	Barnsley
15:00 GMT	Potts 5'; Pinnock (yellow card) 10'; Thiam 14'; Cavaré (yellow card) 51'; Pinillos (yellow card) 72'; Woodrow (yellow card) 73'; Mowatt (yellow card) 90+7'	Report	Pearce (yellow card) 62'; Solly (yellow card) 64' (yellow-red card) 90+6'; Reeves 73'; Dijksteel (yellow card) 80'	Stadium: Oakwell; Attendance: 11,978; Referee: Darren Bond

1 January 2019 25	Luton Town	0–0	Barnsley	Luton
15:00 GMT	Shinnie (yellow card) 79'	Report	Pinnock (yellow card) 63'	Stadium: Kenilworth Road; Attendance: 9,926; Referee: John Brooks

12 January 2019 26	Barnsley	3–0	Bradford City	Barnsley
15:00 GMT	Brown 28' (yellow card) 68'; McGeehan (yellow card) 35'; Moore 38'; Lindsay (yellow card) 58'; Mowatt (yellow card) 81' (goal) 90+2'	Report	Payne (yellow card) 72'; McGowan (yellow card) 79'; Chicksen (red card) 89'	Stadium: Oakwell; Attendance: 14,962; Referee: Jeremy Simpson

19 January 2019 27	AFC Wimbledon	1–4	Barnsley	London
15:00 GMT	Pigott 36'; Seddon (yellow card) 59'; Pinnock (yellow card) 81'	Report	Woodrow 19'; Pinnock (yellow card) 35'; Moore 51'; B Williams (yellow card) 54'; Thiam 65'; McGeehan 90'	Stadium: Kingsmeadow; Attendance: 4,795; Referee: Neil Hair

26 January 2019 28	Barnsley	2–1	Rochdale	Barnsley
15:00 GMT	Moore 54'; Dougall (yellow card) 57'; Woodrow 75'; Davies (yellow card) 83'	Report	Delaney (yellow card) 47'; Henderson 49'; Dooley (yellow card) 68'; Ebanks-Landell (yellow card) 90+5'	Stadium: Oakwell; Attendance: 11,379; Referee: Alan Young

29 January 2019 29	Oxford United	2–2	Barnsley	Oxford
19:45 GMT	Ruffels 25'; Nelson (yellow card) 36'; Mackie 48'; Dickie (yellow card) 90+2'	Report	Thiam (yellow card) 37' (goal) 70'; Dougall (yellow card) 39'; Lindsay (yellow card) 66'; Williams (yellow card) 73'; Moore 79'; Mowatt (yellow card) 87'	Stadium: Kassam Stadium; Attendance: 5,794; Referee: Kevin Johnson

2 February 2019 30	Barnsley	2–0	Scunthorpe United	Barnsley
15:00 GMT	Mowatt 16'; Woodrow (yellow card) 28'; McGeehan 41'; Brown (yellow card) 70'; Bähre (yellow card) 90+1'	Report	Perch (yellow card) 35'; McMahon (yellow card) 89'	Stadium: Oakwell; Attendance: 12,150; Referee: Andy Haines

9 February 2019 31	Gillingham	1–4	Barnsley	Gillingham
15:00 GMT	List 81'; Zakuani (yellow card) 90'; Fuller (yellow card) 90'; Ehmer (yellow card) 90+11'	Report	Moore 1'; Woodrow 45', 71'; McGeehan (yellow card) 63'; Cavaré (yellow card) 81'; Brown 90+11'	Stadium: Priestfield Stadium; Attendance: 4,791; Referee: Trevor Kettle

16 February 2019 32	Barnsley	2–1	Wycombe	Barnsley
15:00 GMT	Woodrow 13' (pen.), 64'; McGeehan (yellow card) 90+4'	Report	Tyson (yellow card) 81'; Jombati (yellow card) 83'; McCarthy (yellow card) 90+4'; El-Abd (red card) 90+5'; Jacobson (yellow card) 90+7' (goal) 90+10' (pen.)	Stadium: Oakwell; Attendance: 11,821; Referee: Matt Donohue

19 February 2019 33	Barnsley	0–0	Burton Albion	Barnsley
19:45 GMT	Mowatt (yellow card) 51'	Report	Daniel (yellow card) 27'	Stadium: Oakwell; Attendance: 11,778; Referee: Martin Coy

23 February 2019 34	Portsmouth	0–0	Barnsley	Portsmouth
15:00 GMT	Bogle (penalty missed) 61'; Clarke (yellow card) 70'	Report	McGeehan (yellow card) 31'	Stadium: Fratton Park; Attendance: 18,624; Referee: Charles Breakspear

2 March 2019 35	Southend United	0–3	Barnsley	Southend
12:30 GMT		Report	Brown (red card) 35'; McGeehan 50'; Woodrow 73'; Green 90+3'	Stadium: Roots Hall; Attendance: 6,217; Referee: Kevin Johnson

9 March 2019 36	Barnsley	2–0	Accrington Stanley	Barnsley
15:00 GMT	Cavaré 41'; Wood 45+1' (o.g.); Pinillos (yellow card) 62'	Report	McConville (yellow card) 26'	Stadium: Oakwell; Attendance: 11,533; Referee: Dean Whitestone

12 March 2019 37	Barnsley	0–0	Sunderland	Barnsley
19:45 GMT	Pinnock (yellow card) 63'	Report	Leadbitter (yellow card) 21'; Power (yellow card) 88'	Stadium: Oakwell; Attendance: 18,282; Referee: Peter Bankes

15 March 2019 38	Doncaster Rovers	0–0	Barnsley	Doncaster
19:45 GMT		Report	Lindsay (yellow card) 20'; Mowatt (yellow card) 90+1'	Stadium: Keepmoat Stadium; Attendance: 11,710; Referee: Ross Joyce

23 March 2019 39	Walsall	0–1	Barnsley	Walsall
12:00 GMT	Dobson (yellow card) 82'	Report	Lindsay (yellow card) 41'; Green (yellow card) 89'; Brown 90+2' (yellow card) 90+3'	Stadium: Bescot Stadium; Attendance: 4,969; Referee: Ben Toner

30 March 2019 40	Barnsley	2–2	Coventry City	Barnsley
15:00 GMT	Mowatt 9'; McGeehan (yellow card) 45+1'; Woodrow 48'; Williams (yellow card) 82'; Bähre (yellow card) 90+6'	Report	Hiwula 35'; Thomas 62' (yellow card) 63'	Stadium: Oakwell; Attendance: 13,593; Referee: Stephen Martin

6 April 2019 41	Burton Albion	3–1	Barnsley	Burton upon Trent
15:00 BST	Allen 5'; Boyce (yellow card) 8' (goal) 81'; Harness 89'	Report	Bähre (yellow card) 74'; Woodrow (yellow card) 83' (goal) 85' (pen.)	Stadium: Pirelli Stadium; Attendance: 4,310; Referee: Michael Salisbury

13 April 2019 42	Barnsley	4–2	Fleetwood Town	Barnsley
15:00 BST	Bähre 21'; Woodrow 34'; McGeehan (yellow card) 35' (goal) 70'; Pinillos (yellow card) 42'; Brown 79'	Report	Wallace (yellow card) 58'; Coyle (yellow card) 58'; Evans 64'; Souttar (red card) 65'; Burns 77'	Stadium: Oakwell; Attendance: 11,243; Referee: Sebastian Stockbridge

19 April 2019 43	Barnsley	2–1	Shrewsbury Town	Barnsley
15:00 BST	Mowatt 23'; Brown 55'	Report	Campbell 38'	Stadium: Oakwell; Attendance: 13,426; Referee: Scott Oldham

22 April 2019 44	Plymouth Argyle	0–3	Barnsley	Plymouth
15:00 BST		Report	Woodrow 15'; Brown 21'; Mowatt 28'	Stadium: Home Park; Attendance: 10,898; Referee: Stephen Martin

27 April 2019 45	Barnsley	2–1	Blackpool	Barnsley
15:00 BST	Woodrow 40'; Lindsay 59'	Report	Pritchard 15'	Stadium: Oakwell; Attendance: 14,703; Referee: John Busby

4 May 2019 46	Bristol Rovers	2–1	Barnsley	Horwich
17:30 BST	Rodman 71', 90+2'; Upson (yellow card) 77'	Report	Moore 12'; Lindsay (yellow card) 37' (yellow-red card) 44'; Mowatt (yellow card) 56'	Stadium: Memorial Stadium; Attendance: 9,859; Referee: Darren Drysdale

=== FA Cup ===
The first round draw was made live on BBC by Dennis Wise and Dion Dublin on 22 October. The draw for the second round was made live on BBC and BT by Mark Schwarzer and Glenn Murray on 12 November. The third round draw was made live on BBC by Ruud Gullit and Paul Ince from Stamford Bridge on 3 December 2018.

10 November 2018 First round	Barnsley	4–0	Notts County	Barnsley
15:00 BST	Woodrow 48'; Fryers 53'; Potts 77'; Moore 81'	Report		Stadium: Oakwell; Attendance: 5,878; Referee: Sebastian Stockbridge

1 December 2018 Second round	Southend United	2–4	Barnsley	Southend-on-Sea
15:00 GMT	Mantom 45+4'; Dieng 84'	Report	Moore 41'; Fryer (yellow card) 45+2'; Woodrow 56', 70'; Bähre 90+5'	Stadium: Roots Hall; Attendance: 3,616; Referee: Paul Marsden

5 January 2019 Third round	Burnley	1–0	Barnsley	Burnley
12:30 GMT	Long (yellow card) 87'; Wood 90+2' (pen.)	Report	Williams (yellow card) 67'	Stadium: Turf Moor; Referee: Simon Hooper

=== EFL Cup ===
On 15 June 2018, the draw for the first round was made in Vietnam.

14 August 2018 First round	Blackpool	3–1	Barnsley	Blackpool
19:45 BST	Pritchard (yellow card) 46', (goal) 56'; Nottingham 50'; Gnaduillet 80'; Tilt (yellow card) 89'	Report	Moncur 19'; Dougall (yellow card) 28'; Walton (yellow card) 79'	Stadium: Bloomfield Road; Attendance: 1,937; Referee: Mark Heywood

=== EFL Trophy ===
On 13 July 2018, the initial group stage draw bar the U21 invited clubs was announced. The draw for the second round was made live on Talksport by Leon Britton and Steve Claridge on 16 November.

Pos	Lge	Team	Pld	W	PW	PL	L	GF	GA	GD	Pts	Qualification
1	L1	Barnsley	3	2	1	0	0	5	3	+2	8	Round 2
2	L2	Oldham Athletic	3	2	0	0	1	8	5	+3	6	Round 2
3	ACA	Everton U21	3	0	0	2	1	4	5	−1	2	
4	L1	Bradford City	3	0	1	0	2	3	7	−4	2	

Source: EFL.com

4 September 2018 Group stages	Oldham Athletic	1–2	Barnsley	Oldham
19:45 BST	Surridge 31'	Report	Adeboyejo 44'; Jackson (yellow card) 54'; Moncur 82'	Stadium: Bpundary Park; Attendance: 1,786

6 November 2018 Group stages	Barnsley	1–1 (4–2 p)	Everton U21	Barnsley
19:30 BST	Hedges 40'	Report	Sambou 53'	Stadium: Oakwell; Attendance: 2,300; Referee: Matthew Donohue
	Penalties
	Moncur (penalty scored); Brown (penalty scored); Bähre (penalty scored); Thiam (penalty scored)		Adeniran (penalty scored); Mathis (penalty missed); Kiersey (penalty scored); Lavery (penalty missed)

13 November 2018 Group stages	Barnsley	2–1	Bradford City	Barnsley
19:30 GMT	Moncur 28', 64'; Jackson (red card) 77'	Report	Ball 8'	Stadium: Oakwell; Attendance: 2,925

4 December 2018 Second round	Barnsley	3–3 (3–5 p)	Manchester City U21	Barnsley
19:30 GMT	Adeboyejo 17'; Williams 61'; Lindsay 65'	Report	Matondo 45+2'; Poveda 59', 74'	Stadium: Oakwell; Attendance: 3,070
	Penalties
	Moore (penalty scored); Mowatt (penalty scored); Thiam (penalty missed); Brown (penalty scored)		Sandler (penalty scored); Richards (penalty scored); Matondo (penalty scored); Poveda (penalty scored); Pozo (penalty scored)

== Transfers ==
=== Transfers in ===
Date from	Position	Nationality	Name	From	Fee	Ref.
5 July 2018	LB	(England)	Jordan Barnett	Burnley	Free transfer	
5 July 2018	CM	(England)	Tai-Reece Chisholm	Birmingham City	Free transfer	
5 July 2018	CM	(England)	Elvis Otim	Nottingham Forest	Free transfer	
10 July 2018	WG	(England)	Louis Walsh	Free agent	Free transfer	
26 July 2018	DM	(Australia)	Kenneth Dougall	(Netherlands) Sparta Rotterdam	Undisclosed	
6 August 2018	AM	(England)	Callum Styles	Bury	Undisclosed	
8 August 2018	RB	(England)	Jordan Williams	Huddersfield Town	Undisclosed	
9 August 2018	CF	(Republic of Ireland)	Gerry McDonagh	Nottingham Forest	Free transfer	
3 January 2019	CF	(England)	Cauley Woodrow	Fulham	Undisclosed	
18 January 2019	RW	(England)	Jordan Green	Yeovil Town	Undisclosed	
21 January 2019	FW	(Uruguay)	Mateo Aramburu	(France) Le Touquet	Free transfer	
21 January 2019	LW	(Portugal)	Elliot Simões	FC United of Manchester	Undisclosed	
31 January 2019	CF	(England)	George Miller	Middlesbrough	Undisclosed	

=== Transfers out ===
Date from	Position	Nationality	Name	To	Fee	Ref.
1 July 2018	CF	(England)	Bradley Ash	Boreham Wood	Free transfer	
1 July 2018	CF	(England)	Tom Clare	Bradford City	Free transfer	
1 July 2018	RW	(England)	Adam Hammill	(Scotland) St Mirren	Released	
1 July 2018	AM	(Austria)	Christoph Knasmüllner	(Austria) Rapid Wien	Undisclosed	
1 July 2018	CB	(England)	Matt Mills	(India) Pune City	Released	
1 July 2018	FW	(England)	Wilberforce Ocran	Charlton Athletic	Free transfer	
1 July 2018	RB	(England)	Matty Pearson	Luton Town	Undisclosed	
1 July 2018	GK	(England)	Nick Townsend	(Wales) Newport County	Released	
1 July 2018	RB	(Ghana)	Andy Yiadom	Reading	Free transfer	
6 July 2018	CM	(Scotland)	Stevie Mallan	(Scotland) Hibernian	Undisclosed	
3 August 2018	CF	(England)	Shaun Tuton	Chester	Free transfer	
9 August 2018	RB	(England)	Jason McCarthy	Wycombe Wanderers	Undisclosed	
3 January 2019	CF	(Wales)	Tom Bradshaw	Millwall	£1,000,000	
3 January 2019	CM	(England)	Brad Potts	Preston North End	Undisclosed	
9 January 2019	CF	(Republic of Ireland)	Gerry McDonagh	Aldershot Town	Free transfer	
18 January 2019	CM	(England)	George Moncur	Luton Town	Undisclosed	

=== Loans in ===
Start date	Position	Nationality	Name	From	End date	Ref.
24 August 2018	CF	(England)	Cauley Woodrow	Fulham	2 January 2019	
31 August 2018	AM	(Germany)	Mike-Steven Bähre	(Germany) Hannover 96	31 May 2019	
16 November 2018	GK	(England)	Jordan Smith	Nottingham Forest	23 November 2018	
1 February 2019	MF	(Malta)	Marcus Grima	(Malta) St Andrews	31 May 2019	

=== Loans out ===
Start date	Position	Nationality	Name	To	End date	Ref.
6 August 2018	AM	(England)	Callum Styles	Bury	1 January 2019	
17 August 2018	RM	(England)	Dylan Mottley-Henry	Tranmere Rovers	1 January 2019	
23 August 2018	CF	(Wales)	Tom Bradshaw	Millwall	2 January 2019	
3 November 2018	CF	(England)	Louis Walsh	Guiseley	1 December 2018	
7 December 2018	CF	(Republic of Ireland)	Gerry McDonagh	Aldershot Town	3 January 2019	
21 December 2018	MF	(England)	Romal Palmer	Darlington	31 May 2019	
21 December 2018	CB	(England)	Will Smith	Darlington	31 May 2019	
30 January 2019	LW	(Wales)	Lloyd Isgrove	Portsmouth	31 May 2019	
31 January 2019	CF	(England)	George Miller	Bradford City	31 May 2019	
7 February 2019	RM	(England)	Dylan Mottley-Henry	Harrogate Town	31 May 2019	
26 March 2019	RB	(England)	Louis Wardle	Curzon Ashton	31 May 2019	
28 March 2019	MF	(England)	Danny Greenfield	Chorley	31 May 2019	
28 March 2019	MF	(England)	Jasper Moon	York City	31 May 2019	
28 March 2019	MF	(England)	Elvis Otim	Sheffield	31 May 2019	
