= Ethan Pinnock =

Footballer (born 1993)

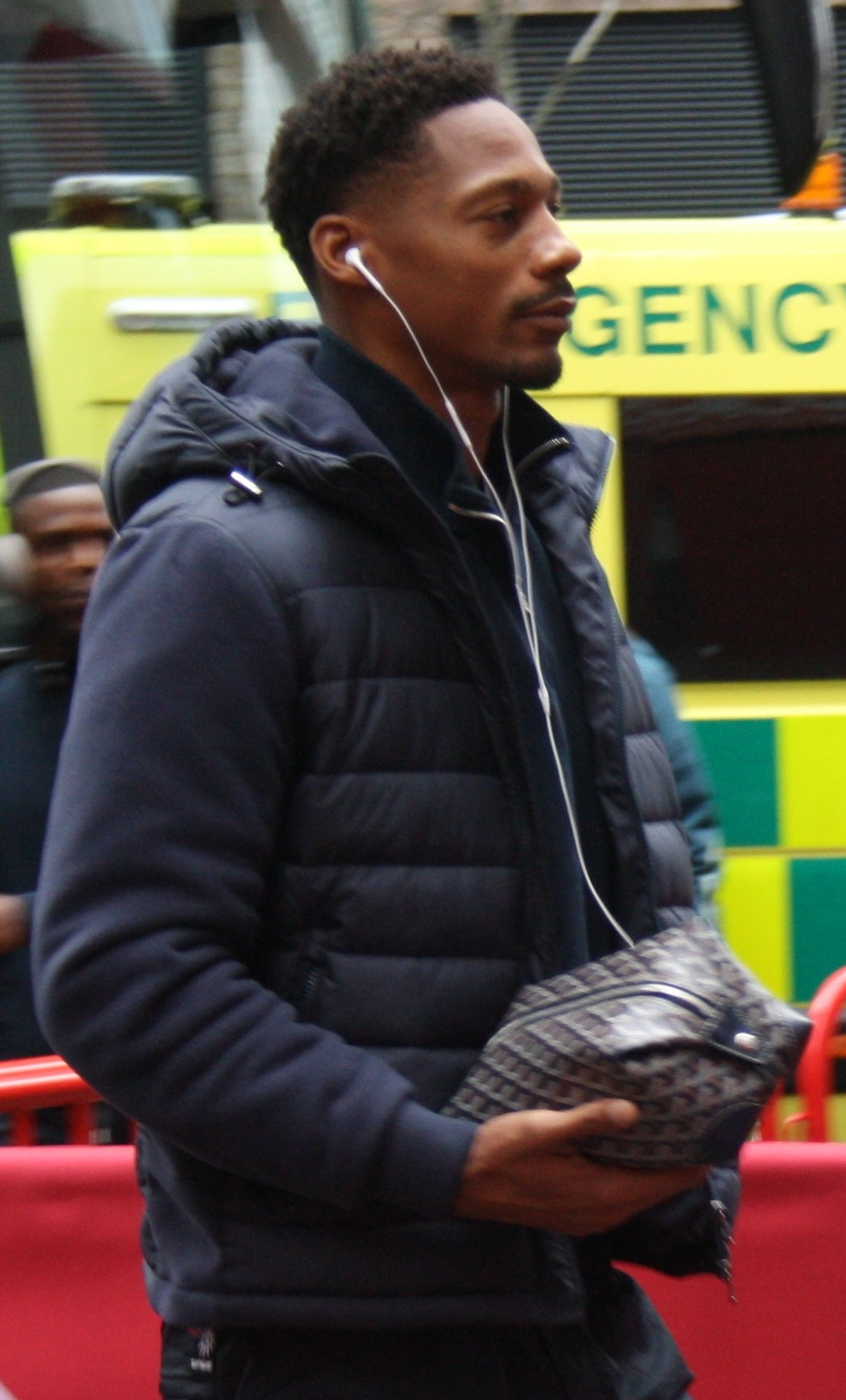
- Pinnock prior to a Brentford match in 2025

Personal information
- Full name: Ethan Rupert Pinnock
- Date of birth: 29 May 1993 (age 33)
- Place of birth: Lambeth, England
- Height: 6 ft 4 in (1.92 m)
- Position: Centre-back

Team information
- Current team: Coventry City
- Number: 2

Youth career
- Glebe
- –2008: Millwall
- 2008–: Fisher Athletic
- AFC Wimbledon
- –2010: Dulwich Hamlet

Senior career*
| Years | Team | Apps | (Gls) |
| 2010–2016 | Dulwich Hamlet | 159 | (10) |
| 2011 | → Holmesdale (loan) | | |
| 2016–2017 | Forest Green Rovers | 37 | (3) |
| 2017–2019 | Barnsley | 58 | (3) |
| 2019–2026 | Brentford | 192 | (11) |
| 2026– | Coventry City | 10 | (0) |

International career^{‡}
| 2016 | England C | 1 | (0) |
| 2021– | Jamaica | 28 | (0) |
- * Club domestic league appearances and goals as of 13 October 2026 ‡ National team caps and goals as of 23:50, 31 March 2026 (UTC)

Ethan Rupert Pinnock (born 29 May 1993) is a professional footballer who plays as a centre-back for Premier League club Coventry City. Born in England, he plays for the Jamaica national team.

Pinnock began his career in non-League football with Dulwich Hamlet and Forest Green Rovers, before rising to prominence in the English Football League with Barnsley, from whom he transferred to Brentford in 2019. Pinnock was capped by England C during his non-League career and later represented Jamaica at full international level.

== Club career ==
=== Dulwich Hamlet ===
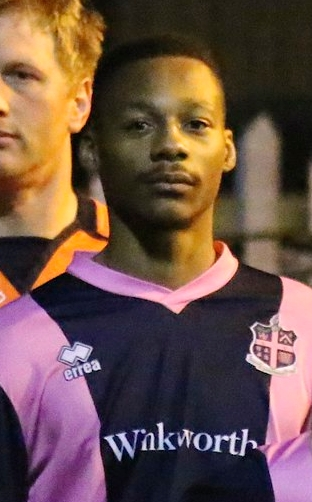
Pinnock lining up for Dulwich Hamlet in 2015.

Beginning his career as a left winger or left back, Pinnock played in the Millwall academy between the ages of 9 and 15. Following spells with Fisher Athletic London, AFC Wimbledon and Glebe, Pinnock entered the youth system at Isthmian League club Dulwich Hamlet. He progressed to be fringe member of the first team squad during the 2010–11 season, which included a spell on loan at Kent County League Premier Division club Holmesdale, during which he was deployed as a utility player. A growth spurt led to Pinnock being converted into a central defender during his time with the club. To that point, he had also been deployed as a central midfielder.

By the 2014–15 season, Pinnock had established himself as Dulwich Hamlet captain and a mainstay of the team. He was a part of the club's 2012–13 Division One South-winning team and won the club's Player of the Year awards in the 2014–15 and 2015–16 seasons. Pinnock departed Dulwich Hamlet in June 2016, after making 195 appearances and scoring 12 goals during his time at Champion Hill.

=== Forest Green Rovers ===
On 21 June 2016, Pinnock signed a two-year contract with National League club Forest Green Rovers for an undisclosed fee. He made 45 appearances and scored three goals during Rovers' 2016–17 National League playoffs-winning season, which saw the club promoted to the EFL for the first time in its history. Pinnock departed the club in June 2017.

=== Barnsley ===
On 30 June 2017, Pinnock signed a three-year contract with Championship club Barnsley for an undisclosed fee, reported to be "in excess of £1 million", plus add-ons. His former club Dulwich Hamlet received a £100,000 sell-on. Down the pecking order during the first half of the 2017–18 season, injuries to other players allowed Pinnock to break into the starting lineup during December 2017 and January 2018. He scored his first two goals for the club in league matches versus Reading and Sunderland either side of the New Year. Pinnock finished an injury-affected 2017–18 season with 15 appearances and suffered relegation with the club to League One.

Pinnock missed just two matches in all competitions during the 2018–19 season and helped the Tykes to automatic promotion back to the Championship. He won the club's Player of the Year award and was named in the PFA and EFL League One Team of the Year selections. Pinnock departed Oakwell on 2 July 2019, after making 67 appearances and scoring three goals for Barnsley.

=== Brentford ===
==== 2019–2021 ====
On 2 July 2019, Pinnock signed a three-year contract with Championship club Brentford, with the option of a further year, for an undisclosed fee, reported to be £3 million. He displaced Julian Jeanvier and broke into the team alongside Pontus Jansson in November 2019 and his performances after the season restart in June and July 2020 saw him nominated for the PFA Fans' Player of the Month award. Pinnock made 40 appearances and scored two goals during the 2019–20 season, which culminated in defeat in the 2020 Championship play-off final.

After beginning the 2020–21 season as an ever-present in league matches, Pinnock signed a new five-year contract on 10 November 2020. He made 48 appearances and two goals during a 2020–21 season which ended with promotion to the Premier League, after victory in the 2021 Championship play-off final. In recognition of his league performances during the season, Pinnock was named in the 2020–21 PFA Championship Team of the Year.

==== 2021–2024 ====
Pinnock began the 2021–22 season as an ever-present starter in Premier League matches and he scored his only goal of the campaign in a 3–3 draw with Liverpool on 25 September 2021. Pinnock remained a virtual-ever present until suffering a season-ending hamstring injury on his 35th appearance, during a 2–1 victory over Watford on 16 April 2022. A knee injury suffered in July 2022 saw Pinnock miss the entire 2022–23 pre-season and the first two months of the regular season. He made 31 appearances and scored three goals during a season in which Brentford remained in contention for a place in Europe on the final day. On the eve of the final match of the 2022–23 season, Pinnock signed a new four-year contract.

Prior to missing two months with an ankle injury suffered in mid-February 2024, Pinnock had started in all but one of Brentford's 24 league matches so far during the 2023–24 season. He ended 2023 as the Premier League player with the most aerial duels won and clearances made in the calendar year. Pinnock ended the 2023–24 season with 31 appearances, two goals and his performances were recognised with the Brentford Supporters' Player of the Year award.

==== 2024–2026 ====
After beginning the 2024–25 season as an ever-present starter in league matches alongside Nathan Collins, a hamstring injury suffered in December 2024 caused Pinnock to miss six weeks either side of the New Year. He returned to make six appearances, before being dropped to the bench for the first time in his Brentford career. Pinnock ended the 2024–25 season with 23 appearances and two goals.

Well down the central defensive pecking order under new head coach Keith Andrews, Pinnock made just eight appearances during the 2025–26 season.

=== Coventry City ===
On 24 August 2026, newly promoted Premier League side Coventry City agreed to sign Pinnock for £6 million on a three-year contract, with the option of extending by one year.

== International career ==
In October 2016, Pinnock was called up to the England C national team and won his only cap in a 2–1 win over Estonia U23 in November 2016. In March 2021, Pinnock was one of six English-born players to receive their first call-up to the Jamaica national team for a friendly match versus the United States. He played the opening 64 minutes of the 4–1 defeat. Pinnock was named in Jamaica's 2024 Copa América squad and started in each group stage match prior to the team's elimination from the tournament. After not being named in the final squad in 2021 and not travelling to the tournament in 2023, Pinnock appeared in each of the team's 2025 Gold Cup matches prior to its elimination from the group stage.

== Personal life ==
Pinnock is of Jamaican descent on his father's side and grew up in Thornton Heath. His older brother Sol and cousin Nyron Nosworthy also became footballers. Pinnock attended Shirley High School, Reigate College and graduated with a 2:1 in physical education from the University of Greenwich in 2015. Prior to transferring to Forest Green Rovers in 2016, Pinnock worked for a sports coaching company.

== Career statistics ==
=== Club ===
As of match played 21 November 2026

Appearances and goals by club, season and competition
| Club | Season | League | | | FA Cup | | League Cup | | Other | | Total | |
| Club | Season | Division | Apps | Goals | Apps | Goals | Apps | Goals | Apps | Goals | Apps | Goals |
|---|---|---|---|---|---|---|---|---|---|---|---|---|
| Dulwich Hamlet | 2010–11 | Isthmian League Division One South | 11 | 1 | 0 | 0 | ― | | 4 (Note: Two appearances in Isthmian League Division One South play-offs, two appearances in Isthmian League Cup) | 0 | 15 | 1 |
| Dulwich Hamlet | 2011–12 | Isthmian League Division One South | 29 | 1 | 0 | 0 | ― | | 3 (Note: Appearance(s) in Isthmian League Cup) | 0 | 32 | 1 |
| Dulwich Hamlet | 2012–13 | Isthmian League Division One South | 8 | 0 | 1 | 0 | ― | | 1 | 0 | 10 | 0 |
| Dulwich Hamlet | 2013–14 | Isthmian League Premier Division | 28 | 0 | 2 | 1 | ― | | 8 (Note: Three appearances in FA Trophy, two appearances in Isthmian League Cup, two appearances in London Senior Cup, one appearance in Isthmian League Charity Shield) | 0 | 38 | 1 |
| Dulwich Hamlet | 2014–15 | Isthmian League Premier Division | 46 | 2 | 1 | 0 | ― | | 3 (Note: Two appearances in FA Trophy, one appearance in Isthmian League Premier Division play-offs) | 0 | 50 | 2 |
| Dulwich Hamlet | 2015–16 | Isthmian League Premier Division | 37 | 6 | 2 | 0 | ― | | 11 (Note: Five appearances and one goal in FA Trophy, three appearances in London Senior Cup, two appearances in Isthmian League Premier Division play-offs, one appearance in Isthmian League Cup) | 1 | 50 | 7 |
| Dulwich Hamlet | Total | | 159 | 10 | 6 | 1 | ― | | 30 | 1 | 195 | 12 |
| Forest Green Rovers | 2016–17 | National League | 37 | 3 | 1 | 0 | ― | | 7 (Note: Four appearances in FA Trophy, three appearances in National League play-offs) | 0 | 45 | 3 |
| Barnsley | 2017–18 | Championship | 12 | 2 | 1 | 0 | 2 | 0 | ― | | 15 | 2 |
| Barnsley | 2018–19 | League One | 46 | 1 | 3 | 0 | 1 | 0 | 2 (Note: Appearances in EFL Trophy) | 0 | 52 | 1 |
| Barnsley | Total | | 58 | 3 | 4 | 0 | 3 | 0 | 2 | 0 | 67 | 3 |
| Brentford | 2019–20 | Championship | 36 | 2 | 1 | 0 | 0 | 0 | 3 (Note: Appearances in Championship play-offs) | 0 | 40 | 2 |
| Brentford | 2020–21 | Championship | 39 | 1 | 2 | 0 | 4 | 1 | 3 | 0 | 48 | 2 |
| Brentford | 2021–22 | Premier League | 32 | 1 | 1 | 0 | 2 | 0 | ― | | 35 | 1 |
| Brentford | 2022–23 | Premier League | 30 | 3 | 0 | 0 | 1 | 0 | ― | | 31 | 3 |
| Brentford | 2023–24 | Premier League | 29 | 2 | 1 | 0 | 1 | 0 | ― | | 31 | 2 |
| Brentford | 2024–25 | Premier League | 22 | 2 | 0 | 0 | 1 | 0 | ― | | 23 | 2 |
| Brentford | 2025–26 | Premier League | 4 | 0 | 2 | 0 | 2 | 0 | ― | | 8 | 0 |
| Brentford | Total | | 192 | 11 | 7 | 0 | 11 | 1 | 6 | 0 | 216 | 12 |
| Coventry City | 2026–27 | Premier League | 10 | 0 | 0 | 0 | 1 | 0 | — | | 11 | 0 |
| Career total | | | 456 | 27 | 18 | 1 | 14 | 1 | 45 | 1 | 533 | 30 |

=== International ===
As of match played 31 March 2026

Appearances and goals by national team and year
| National team | Year | Apps | Goals |
|---|---|---|---|
| Jamaica | 2021 | 2 | 0 |
| Jamaica | 2022 | 3 | 0 |
| Jamaica | 2023 | 5 | 0 |
| Jamaica | 2024 | 7 | 0 |
| Jamaica | 2025 | 9 | 0 |
| Jamaica | 2026 | 2 | 0 |
| Total | | 28 | 0 |

== Honours ==
Dulwich Hamlet

- Isthmian League Division One South: 2012–13
- Isthmian League Charity Shield: 2013–14

Forest Green Rovers

- National League play-offs: 2017

Brentford

- EFL Championship play-offs: 2021

Individual

- Dulwich Hamlet Supporters Player of the Year: 2014–15
- Dulwich Hamlet Players' Player of the Year: 2014–15, 2015–16
- Barnsley Player of the Year: 2018–19
- Barnsley Player of the Month: December 2018
- Brentford Supporters' Player of the Year: 2023–24
- PFA EFL League One Team of the Year: 2018–19
- EFL League One Team of the Year: 2018–19
- PFA EFL Championship Team of the Year: 2020–21
