= 2021–22 Luton Town F.C. season =

English football club season

Luton Town F.C.
2021–22 season
- Owner: Luton Town Football Club 2020 Limited
- Chairman: David Wilkinson
- Manager: Nathan Jones
- Stadium: Kenilworth Road
- Championship: 6th
- Play-offs: Semi-final (eliminated by Huddersfield Town)
- FA Cup: Fifth round (eliminated by Chelsea)
- EFL Cup: First round (eliminated by Stevenage)
- Top goalscorer: League: Elijah Adebayo (16); All: Elijah Adebayo (17)
- Highest home attendance: 10,140 vs Chelsea, FA Cup, 2 March 2022
- Lowest home attendance: 4,834 vs Harrogate Town, FA Cup, 9 January 2022
Home colours	Away colours	Third colours

The 2021–22 season was the 136th season of competitive football and third consecutive season in the Championship played by Luton Town Football Club, a professional association football club based in Luton, Bedfordshire, England. Luton also competed in the FA Cup and EFL Cup. The season covered the period from 1 July 2021 to 30 June 2022.

== Background and pre-season ==
After leading Luton Town to safety from relegation on the final day of the 2019–20 season, Nathan Jones guided the team to a top-half finish in 2020–21 with their highest points total in the second tier since 1981–82.

Luton Town's first-team pre-season programme began with an away fixture against Hitchin Town, before a week-long training camp at Queen Ethelburga's College in York, North Yorkshire, England, which concluded with a behind-closed-doors match against Rochdale. This was followed by friendlies away to Bedford Town and Boreham Wood, before home fixtures against Portsmouth and Brighton & Hove Albion.

Pre-season match details
Date	Opponents	Venue	Result	Score F–A	Scorers	Attendance	Ref.
3 July 2021	Hitchin Town	A	W	7–0	Clark (4) 30', 32', 34', 43', Bree 60', Lee 77', Mendes Gomes 85'	1,250	
10 July 2021	Rochdale	N	W	4–0	Adebayo 18' pen., Burke 45', Cornick 54', Jerome 65'	(Note: Match played behind closed doors)	
14 July 2021	Bedford Town	A	W	5–0	Mendes Gomes 9', Richardson 31' o.g., Lansbury 75', Bree 89', Cornick 90'		
17 July 2021	Boreham Wood	A	W	3–1	Clark (2) 74', 89', Mendes Gomes 86'	877	
24 July 2021	Portsmouth	H	D	1–1	Adebayo 10'		
31 July 2021	Brighton & Hove Albion	H	L	1–3	Cornick 44'		

== Match results ==
=== EFL Championship ===
EFL Championship match details
Date	League position	Opponents	Venue	Result	Score F–A	Scorers	Attendance	Ref.
7 August 2021	2nd	Peterborough United	H	W	3–0	Adebayo 30', Cornick 68', Onyedinma 71'	10,019	
14 August 2021	11th	West Bromwich Albion	A	L	2–3	Cornick 70', Mpanzu 90+8'	23,283	
17 August 2021	3rd	Barnsley	A	W	1–0	Bell 4'	12,999	
21 August 2021	11th	Birmingham City	H	L	0–5		10,014	
28 August 2021	12th	Sheffield United	H	D	0–0		9,774	
11 September 2021	12th	Blackburn Rovers	A	D	2–2	Berry (2) 73', 90+8'	11,241	
15 September 2021	13th	Bristol City	A	D	1–1	Hylton 90+1'	16,878	
18 September 2021	13th	Swansea City	H	D	3–3	Berry 7', Adebayo (2) 15' pen., 23'	9,721	
25 September 2021	16th	AFC Bournemouth	A	L	1–2	Kelly 64' o.g.	9,737	
29 September 2021	9th	Coventry City	H	W	5–0	Adebayo (2) 3' pen., 45+7', Cornick (2) 18', 58', Berry 30'	9,805	
2 October 2021	13th	Huddersfield Town	H	D	0–0		9,977	
16 October 2021	10th	Millwall	A	W	2–0	Cornick (2) 11', 53'	14,227	
19 October 2021	9th	Derby County	A	D	2–2	Onyedinma 48', Adebayo 83'	20,258	
23 October 2021	5th	Hull City	H	W	1–0	Adebayo 17'	9,999	
30 October 2021	10th	Preston North End	A	L	0–2		11,059	
2 November 2021	6th	Middlesbrough	H	W	3–1	Bradley 57', Adebayo 60', Cornick 62'	9,790	
6 November 2021	11th	Stoke City	H	L	0–1		10,068	
19 November 2021	11th	Queens Park Rangers	A	L	0–2		15,062	
23 November 2021	11th	Nottingham Forest	A	D	0–0		25,715	
27 November 2021	14th	Cardiff City	H	L	1–2	Clark 64'	9,987	
4 December 2021	12th	Blackpool	A	W	3–0	Bradley 42', Adebayo 54', Clark 90+1'	11,366	
11 December 2021	12th	Fulham	H	D	1–1	Adebayo 62'	9,992	
15 January 2022	13th	AFC Bournemouth	H	W	3–2	Kelly 30' o.g., Campbell 42', Naismith 90+7'	9,649	
19 January 2022	11th	Reading	A	W	2–0	Holmes 33' o.g., Campbell 58'	9,611	
22 January 2022	13th	Sheffield United	A	L	0–2		27,780	
25 January 2022	10th	Bristol City	H	W	2–1	Lockyer 42', Adebayo 68'	9,202	
29 January 2022	10th	Blackburn Rovers	H	D	0–0		9,987	
1 February 2022	9th	Swansea City	A	W	1–0	Cornick 72'	16,598	
8 February 2022	7th	Barnsley	H	W	2–1	Campbell 28', Adebayo 59' pen.	9,101	
12 February 2022	10th	Birmingham City	A	L	0–3		17,292	
19 February 2022	8th	West Bromwich Albion	H	W	2–0	Jerome 55', Campbell 83'	10,021	
23 February 2022	8th	Stoke City	A	W	2–1	Hylton 56', Jerome 81'	18,270	
26 February 2022	6th	Derby County	H	W	1–0	Hylton 67'	10,070	
5 March 2022	8th	Middlesbrough	A	L	1–2	Cornick 90+6'	23,817	
8 March 2022	6th	Coventry City	A	W	1–0	Adebayo 38'	16,996	
13 March 2022	7th	Queens Park Rangers	H	L	1–2	Jerome 37'	10,073	
16 March 2022	5th	Preston North End	H	W	4–0	Berry (2) 9', 42', Onyedinma 28', Diaby 59' o.g.	9,408	
19 March 2022	3rd	Hull City	A	W	3–1	Adebayo 9', Cornick 56', Bree 72'	16,555	
2 April 2022	4th	Millwall	H	D	2–2	Adebayo 33', Cooper 87' o.g.	10,069	
5 April 2022	4th	Peterborough United	A	D	1–1	Hylton 49'	10,940	
11 April 2022	5th	Huddersfield Town	A	L	0–2		18,379	
15 April 2022	4th	Nottingham Forest	H	W	1–0	Naismith 37' pen.	10,070	
18 April 2022	4th	Cardiff City	A	W	1–0	Cornick 71'	19,381	
23 April 2022	5th	Blackpool	H	D	1–1	Adebayo 2'	9,843	
2 May 2022	6th	Fulham	A	L	0–7		19,538	
7 May 2022	6th	Reading	H	W	1–0	Cornick 45+1'	10,070	

==== League table ====
Pos	Team	Pld	W	D	L	GF	GA	GD	Pts	Promotion, qualification or relegation
3	Huddersfield Town	46	23	13	10	64	47	+17	82	Qualification for Championship play-offs
4	Nottingham Forest (O, P)	46	23	11	12	73	40	+33	80	Qualification for Championship play-offs
5	Sheffield United	46	21	12	13	63	45	+18	75	Qualification for Championship play-offs
6	Luton Town	46	21	12	13	63	55	+8	75	Qualification for Championship play-offs
7	Middlesbrough	46	20	10	16	59	50	+9	70	
8	Blackburn Rovers	46	19	12	15	59	50	+9	69	
9	Millwall	46	18	15	13	53	45	+8	69	

Updated to match(es) played on unknown. Source: EFL Official Website
Rules for classification: 1) Points; 2) Goal difference; 3) Number of goals scored; 4) Head-to-head results; 5) Wins; 6) Away goals; 7) Penalty points (sec 9.5); 8) 12-point sending off offences
(O) Play-off winners; (P) Promoted

==== Results summary ====
Overall								Home						Away					
Pld	W	D	L	GF	GA	GD	Pts	W	D	L	GF	GA	GD	W	D	L	GF	GA	GD
46	21	12	13	63	55	+8	75	12	7	4	37	22	+15	9	5	9	26	33	−7

Last updated: 7 May 2022.

==== Play-offs ====
EFL Championship play-offs match details
Round	Date	Opponents	Venue	Result	Score F–A	Scorers	Attendance	Ref.
Semi-final first leg	13 May 2022	Huddersfield Town	H	D	1–1	Bradley 30'	10,005	
Semi-final second leg	16 May 2022	Huddersfield Town	A	L	0–1		23,407	

=== FA Cup ===
FA Cup match details
Round	Date	Opponents	Venue	Result	Score F–A	Scorers	Attendance	Ref.
Third round	9 January 2022	Harrogate Town	H	W	4–0	Adebayo 18', Jerome 50', Naismith 82', Berry 88'	4,834	
Fourth round	5 February 2022	Cambridge United	A	W	3–0	Burke 16', Mendes Gomes 23', Muskwe 88'	7,937	
Fifth round	2 March 2022	Chelsea	H	L	2–3	Burke 2', Cornick 40'	10,140	

=== EFL Cup ===
EFL Cup match details
Round	Date	Opponents	Venue	Result	Score F–A	Scorers	Attendance	Ref.
First round	10 August 2021	Stevenage	A	D	2–2; 0–3 pens.	Jerome 5', Muskwe 40'	3,052	

== Transfers ==
=== In ===
Date	Player	Club†	Fee	Ref.
25 May 2021	Fred Onyedinma	Wycombe Wanderers	Undisclosed	
15 June 2021	Allan Campbell	Motherwell	Undisclosed	
26 June 2021	Carlos Mendes Gomes	Morecambe	Undisclosed	
1 July 2021	Amari'i Bell	(Blackburn Rovers)	Free	
1 July 2021	Reece Burke	(Hull City)	Free	
1 July 2021	Cameron Jerome	(Milton Keynes Dons)	Free	
1 July 2021	Henri Lansbury	(Bristol City)	Free	
15 July 2021	Admiral Muskwe	Leicester City	Undisclosed	
21 September 2021	Conor Lawless *	(Reading)	Free	
21 September 2021	Josh Williams *	(Stafford Rangers)	Free	
24 September 2021	Elliot Thorpe	(Tottenham Hotspur)	Free	
25 February 2022	Robert Snodgrass	(West Bromwich Albion)	Free	

† Brackets around club names indicate the player's contract with that club had expired before he joined Luton.
* Signed primarily for the under-21 squad

=== Out ===
Date	Player	Club†	Fee	Ref.
9 August 2021	Joe Morrell	Portsmouth	Undisclosed	
31 January 2022	Simon Sluga	Ludogorets Razgrad	Undisclosed	
30 June 2022	TQ Addy		Released	
30 June 2022	Sam Beckwith	(Maidenhead United)	Released	
30 June 2022	Danny Hylton	(Northampton Town)	Free	
30 June 2022	Elliot Lee		Released	
30 June 2022	Kal Naismith	(Bristol City)	Free	
30 June 2022	Corey Panter		Released	
30 June 2022	Jake Peck		Released	

† Brackets around club names indicate the player joined that club after his Luton contract expired.

=== Loan in ===
Date	Player	Club	Return	Ref.
31 January 2022	Jed Steer	Aston Villa	End of season	
4 March 2022	Alex Palmer	West Bromwich Albion	11 March 2022	
1 May 2022	Matt Ingram	Hull City	18 May 2022	

=== Loan out ===
Date	Player	Club	Return	Ref.
11 July 2021	Corey Panter	Dundee	End of season, recalled 2 January 2022	
13 August 2021	Jake Peck	Concord Rangers	End of season	
26 August 2021	Elliot Lee	Charlton Athletic	End of season	
27 August 2021	Sam Beckwith	Maidenhead United	End of season	
31 August 2021	Peter Kioso	Milton Keynes Dons	End of season, recalled 18 January 2022	
7 October 2021	Ben Stevens	Biggleswade Town	January 2022	
8 October 2021	Dion Pereira	Yeovil Town	One month, terminated due to injury 14 October 2021	
13 October 2021	Matt Moloney	Hitchin Town	January 2022	
4 January 2022	Dion Pereira	Bradford City	End of season	
7 January 2022	Avan Jones	St Albans City	End of season	
22 January 2022	Casey Pettit	Lewes	End of season	
31 January 2022	Glen Rea	Wigan Athletic	End of season, terminated due to injury 17 March 2022	
18 March 2022	Josh Neufville	Yeovil Town	End of season, recalled 14 May 2022	
27 March 2022	TQ Addy	Lewes	End of season	
21 April 2022	Corey Panter	Kidderminster Harriers	End of season	

== Appearances and goals ==
Numbers in parentheses denote appearances as substitute.
Players with name and squad number struck through and marked † left the club during the playing season.
Players with names in italics and marked * were on loan from another club for the whole of their season with Luton.
Players listed with no appearances have been in the matchday squad but only as unused substitutes.
Key to positions: GK – Goalkeeper; DF – Defender; MF – Midfielder; FW – Forward

Players included in matchday squads
No.	Pos.	Nat.	Name	League		FA Cup		EFL Cup		Play-offs		Total		Discipline	
No.	Pos.	Nat.	Name	Apps	Goals	Apps	Goals	Apps	Goals	Apps	Goals	Apps	Goals	A yellow rectangle, denoting the yellow penalty card shown to a player being cautioned	A red rectangle, denoting the red penalty card shown to a player being sent off
1	GK	ENG	James Shea	19	0	1	0	1	0	0	0	21	0	1	0
2	DF	ENG	James Bree	42	1	1	0	0	0	2	0	45	1	5	0
3	DF	ENG	Dan Potts	9 (1)	0	2	0	0	0	0	0	11 (1)	0	2	0
4	MF	SCO	Kal Naismith	42	2	1	1	0	0	2	0	45	3	10	0
5	DF	ENG	Sonny Bradley	20 (2)	2	1	0	0	0	2	1	23 (2)	3	3	1
6	MF	IRL	Glen Rea	8 (4)	0	0	0	1	0	0	0	9 (4)	0	4	0
7	FW	ENG	Harry Cornick	30 (8)	12	1 (1)	1	0 (1)	0	2	0	33 (10)	13	4	0
8	MF	ENG	Luke Berry	10 (3)	6	1 (1)	1	0	0	0	0	11 (4)	7	2	0
9	FW	ENG	Danny Hylton	5 (12)	4	0 (3)	0	0	0	1 (1)	0	6 (16)	4	4	0
10	FW	ENG	Elliot Lee	0	0	0	0	1	0	0	0	1	0	0	0
11	FW	ENG	Elijah Adebayo	38 (2)	16	1	1	0	0	0 (1)	0	39 (3)	17	6	0
~~12~~	GK	CRO	~~Simon Sluga~~ †	19	0	0	0	0	0	0	0	19	0	1	0
12	MF	SCO	Robert Snodgrass	4 (4)	0	0 (1)	0	0	0	1 (1)	0	5 (6)	0	1	0
14	FW	ESP	Carlos Mendes Gomes	2 (7)	0	3	1	1	0	0 (1)	0	6 (8)	1	0	0
15	DF	WAL	Tom Lockyer	27 (2)	1	2	0	1	0	0 (1)	0	30 (3)	1	5	0
16	DF	ENG	Reece Burke	25 (2)	0	3	2	0	0	2	0	30 (2)	2	5	1
17	MF	DRC	Pelly Ruddock Mpanzu	31 (3)	1	0 (1)	0	0	0	0	0	31 (4)	1	3	0
18	MF	ENG	Jordan Clark	19 (6)	2	1	0	0	0	2	0	22 (6)	2	3	0
19	MF	ENG	Dion Pereira	0	0	0	0	0 (1)	0	0	0	0 (1)	0	0	0
20	DF	IRL	Peter Kioso	8 (8)	0	2	0	1	0	0	0	11 (8)	0	3	0
21	GK	ENG	Harry Isted	1 (1)	0	0 (1)	0	0	0	0	0	1 (2)	0	0	0
22	MF	SCO	Allan Campbell	31 (2)	4	0 (3)	0	0 (1)	0	2	0	33 (6)	4	8	0
23	MF	ENG	Henri Lansbury	18 (16)	0	1	0	1	0	1	0	21 (16)	0	11	0
24	MF	NGA	Fred Onyedinma	14 (15)	3	1 (1)	0	0	0	0	0	15 (16)	3	4	0
25	GK	ENG	Jed Steer *	3	0	2	0	0	0	0	0	5	0	0	0
26	FW	ZIM	Admiral Muskwe	7 (13)	0	2	1	1	1	0	0	10 (13)	2	3	0
27	GK	ENG	Matt Ingram *	2	0	0	0	0	0	2	0	4	0	0	0
28	MF	WAL	Elliot Thorpe	0	0	1	0	0	0	0	0	1	0	0	0
29	DF	JAM	Amari'i Bell	40 (1)	1	2 (1)	0	0	0	2	0	44 (2)	1	3	0
31	GK	ENG	Jameson Horlick	0	0	0	0	0	0	0	0	0	0	0	0
32	DF	ENG	Gabriel Osho	16 (7)	0	2	0	1	0	0	0	19 (7)	0	4	0
33	MF	ENG	Sam Beckwith	0	0	0	0	1	0	0	0	1	0	0	0
35	FW	ENG	Cameron Jerome	14 (17)	3	2 (1)	1	1	1	1 (1)	0	18 (19)	5	6	0
36	DF	ENG	Avan Jones	0	0	0	0	0	0	0	0	0	0	0	0
37	FW	IRL	Ed McJannet	0	0	0	0	0	0	0	0	0	0	0	0
40	DF	ENG	Aidan Francis-Clarke	0	0	0	0	0	0	0	0	0	0	0	0
~~41~~	GK	ENG	~~Alex Palmer~~ * †	2	0	0	0	0	0	0	0	2	0	0	0

Players not included in matchday squads
No.	Pos.	Nat.	Name
~~25~~	MF	WAL	~~Joe Morrell~~ †
