= James Shea =

English footballer (born 1991)

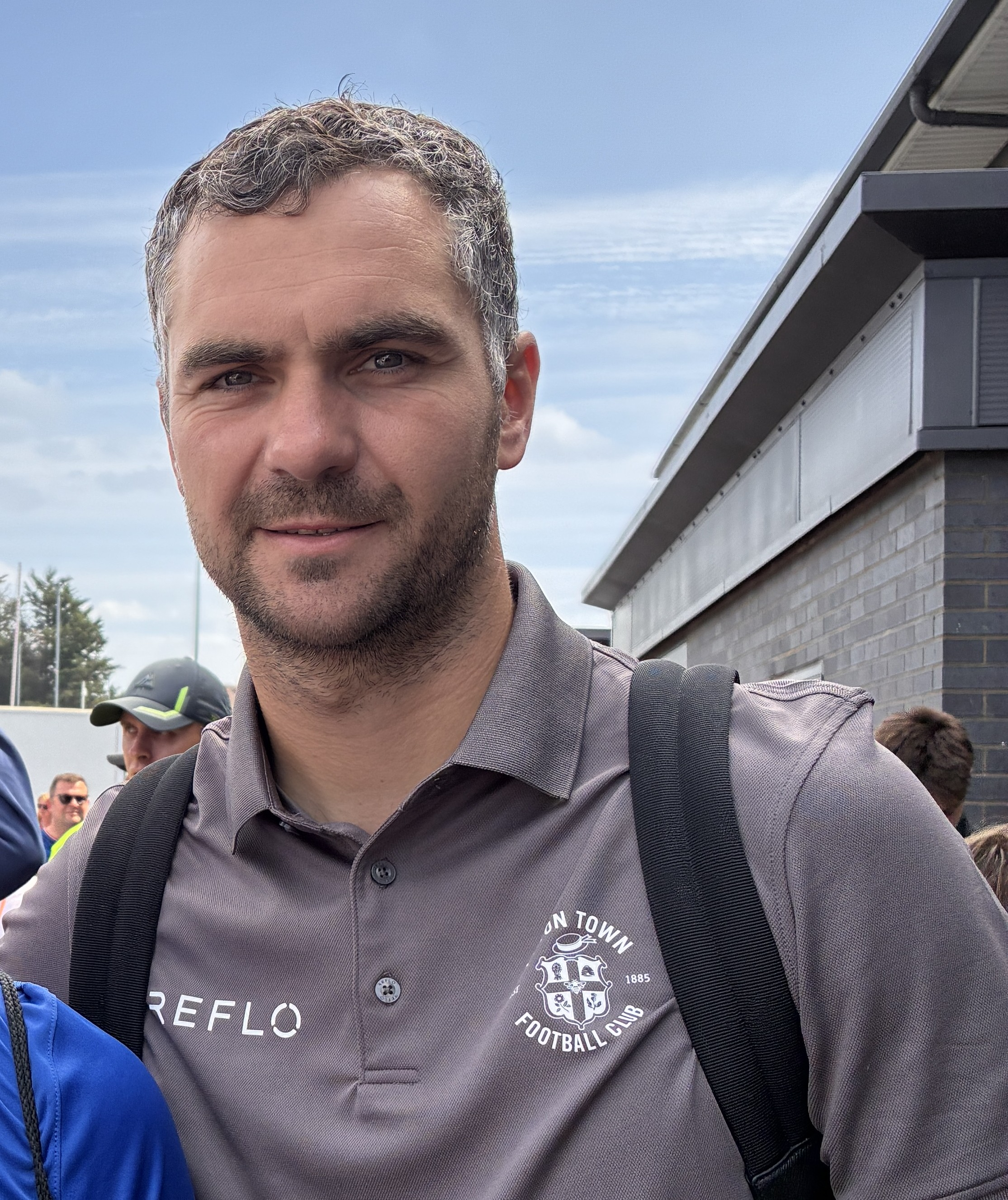
- Shea with Luton Town in 2026

Personal information
- Full name: James William Shea
- Date of birth: 16 June 1991 (age 35)
- Place of birth: Islington, England
- Height: 6 ft 1 in (1.85 m)
- Position: Goalkeeper

Team information
- Current team: Luton Town
- Number: 1

Youth career
- 2007–2010: Arsenal

Senior career*
Years	Team	Apps	(Gls)
2010–2013	Arsenal	0	(0)
2011	→ Southampton (loan)	0	(0)
2011	→ Dagenham & Redbridge (loan)	1	(0)
2013	Needham Market	1	(0)
2013–2014	Harrow Borough	32	(0)
2014–2017	AFC Wimbledon	95	(0)
2017–	Luton Town	102	(0)
- * Club domestic league appearances and goals as of 18:47, 21 November 2026 (UTC)

James William Shea (born 16 June 1991) is an English professional footballer who plays as a goalkeeper for EFL League One club Luton Town.

Having started his career in the Arsenal youth system, he played for Needham Market, Harrow Borough and AFC Wimbledon before joining Luton Town in 2017. He is currently the longest serving player at the club.

== Club career ==
=== Arsenal ===
Born in Islington, Greater London, Shea joined the Arsenal academy in August 2007. In 2009, he won both the Premier Academy League and FA Youth Cup.

Shea joined League One club Southampton on a month-long loan in February 2011 to act as cover for the injured Bartosz Białkowski. However, he was recalled after eight days by Arsenal without making an appearance.

Shea was sent out on loan to League Two club Dagenham & Redbridge for the 2011–12 season. He made his debut as a substitute for Chris Lewington in the match against Macclesfield Town at Moss Rose. Despite getting a yellow card for wasting time, he helped his team to win their first league match of the season by scoreline of 1–0.

He was recalled from his loan by Arsenal on 5 December 2011. On 18 September 2012, he was named on the bench for a UEFA Champions League match against Montpellier HSC due to injuries to Wojciech Szczęsny and Łukasz Fabiański. On 30 June 2013, he was released along with nine other young players at Arsenal.

=== Non-League ===
After a short spell with Isthmian League Division One North club Needham Market, in October 2013 Shea signed for Premier Division club Harrow Borough, where he played 36 matches in all competitions, with 32 of these in the league.

=== AFC Wimbledon ===
Shea joined League Two club AFC Wimbledon on a free transfer on 4 July 2014.

Shea was Wimbledon's regular goalkeeper during the 2014–15 season and at the start of the 2015–16 season, but was replaced by loan signings Kelle Roos and Ben Wilson whilst injured, and was not able to regain his place. He was on the substitutes' bench for all three 2016 League Two play-off matches, including a 2–0 win against Plymouth Argyle at Wembley Stadium to achieve promotion to League One.

=== Luton Town ===
On 3 July 2017, Shea joined League Two club Luton Town on a one-year contract. In his first season at the club he made 8 league appearances in his role as second-choice keeper behind Marek Štěch, however took over as first-choice for the majority of the following 2018–19 season due to Štěch recovering from an operation. During that season the club achieved a second successive automatic promotion, reaching the Championship after a 12-year absence. Shea won the Golden Glove for the season alongside Barnsley's Adam Davies, having both kept 19 clean sheets.

In 2019–20 and 2020–21, Shea was once again second-choice behind new signing Simon Sluga, making 13 and 7 league appearances respectively. In the second half of the 2021–22 season, Shea once again become first-choice after Sluga's departure in January, however in April, Shea was ruled out for the rest of the season after suffering an ACL injury after a collision with team-mate Tom Lockyer during a match away at Cardiff City. He signed a new contract the end of the season.

Shea remained out injured for the first half of the 2022–23 season, with Nottingham Forest loanee Ethan Horvath and new signing Matt Macey taking over. After recovering, he returned to his role as second-choice goalkeeper, including being named on the bench for the 2023 Championship play-off final, in which Luton beat Coventry City on penalties to secure promotion to the Premier League for the first time.

During the 2023–24 season, Shea was demoted to third-choice behind new signings Thomas Kaminski and Tim Krul. He made his Premier League debut on the final day of the season against Fulham, coming on with 15 minutes left of the match. On 24 May 2024, the club announced that it had exercised an option to extend Shea's contract.

Shea continued to be third-choice goalkeeper until the 2024–25 season in League One, in which he became the Luton's longest serving player after the departure of Pelly Ruddock Mpanzu. After Kaminski and Krul left the club after back-to-back relegations, the club signed Josh Keeley from Tottenham Hotspur. Keeley started all but one league game, with Shea playing in every match in the EFL Trophy. He started in the 2026 EFL Trophy final after receiving praise for his performances by Luton manager and former Arsenal youth team-mate Jack Wilshere. They won the game 3–1, with Shea stating that he had now "completed the EFL".

He signed a new contract with Luton Town on 28 August 2025, extending his stay to 10 years with the club.

== International career ==
In August 2010, Shea trained with the England squad for their UEFA Euro 2012 qualifying match against Bulgaria at the Arsenal training ground, due to an injury to David Stockdale. An erroneous Wikipedia entry once led to claims that Shea was eligible for the Republic of Ireland national football team, but Shea affirmed that he had no Irish eligibility.

== Career statistics ==
As of match played 21 November 2026

Appearances and goals by club, season and competition
Club	Season	League			FA Cup		League Cup		Other		Total	
Club	Season	Division	Apps	Goals	Apps	Goals	Apps	Goals	Apps	Goals	Apps	Goals
Arsenal	2010–11	Premier League	0	0	0	0	0	0	0	0	0	0
Arsenal	2011–12	Premier League	0	0	—		—		0	0	0	0
Arsenal	2012–13	Premier League	0	0	0	0	0	0	0	0	0	0
Arsenal	Total		0	0	0	0	0	0	0	0	0	0
Southampton (loan)	2010–11	League One	0	0	—		—		—		0	0
Dagenham & Redbridge (loan)	2011–12	League Two	1	0	1	0	1	0	1 (Note: Appearance(s) in Football League Trophy)	0	4	0
Needham Market	2013–14	Isthmian League Division One North	1	0	0	0	—		0	0	1	0
Harrow Borough	2013–14	Isthmian League Premier Division	32	0	—		—		4 (Note: Three appearances in Isthmian League Cup, one in Middlesex Senior Cup)	0	36	0
AFC Wimbledon	2014–15	League Two	38	0	4	0	1	0	3	0	46	0
AFC Wimbledon	2015–16	League Two	21	0	0	0	1	0	1	0	23	0
AFC Wimbledon	2016–17	League One	36	0	5	0	0	0	2 (Note: Appearances in EFL Trophy)	0	43	0
AFC Wimbledon	Total		95	0	9	0	2	0	6	0	112	0
Luton Town	2017–18	League Two	8	0	0	0	0	0	5	0	13	0
Luton Town	2018–19	League One	41	0	4	0	1	0	0	0	46	0
Luton Town	2019–20	Championship	13	0	0	0	3	0	—		16	0
Luton Town	2020–21	Championship	7	0	0	0	3	0	—		10	0
Luton Town	2021–22	Championship	19	0	1	0	1	0	0	0	21	0
Luton Town	2022–23	Championship	1	0	0	0	0	0	—		1	0
Luton Town	2023–24	Premier League	1	0	0	0	0	0	—		1	0
Luton Town	2024–25	Championship	2	0	0	0	0	0	—		2	0
Luton Town	2025–26	League One	1	0	1	0	1	0	8	0	11	0
Luton Town	2026–27	League One	9	0	0	0	0	0	2	0	11	0
Luton Town	Total		102	0	6	0	9	0	15	0	132	0
Career total			232	0	16	0	12	0	26	0	285	0

== Honours ==
Arsenal

- Premier Academy League: 2008–09
- FA Youth Cup: 2008–09

AFC Wimbledon

- Football League Two play-offs: 2016

Luton Town

- EFL Championship play-offs: 2023
- EFL League One: 2018–19
- EFL Trophy: 2025–26
- EFL League Two runner-up: 2017–18

Individual

- Harrow Borough Player of the Year: 2013–14
- EFL League One Golden Glove: 2018–19
