= Peter Kioso =

DR Congolese footballer (born 1999)

Personal information
- Full name: Peter Kioso
- Date of birth: 15 August 1999 (age 27)
- Place of birth: Swords, County Dublin, Ireland
- Height: 1.83 m (6 ft 0 in)
- Position: Wing-back

Team information
- Current team: Oxford United
- Number: 30

Youth career
- 2007–2010: Malahide United
- 2013–2017: Milton Keynes Dons

Senior career*
Years	Team	Apps	(Gls)
2017–2018	Dunstable Town		
2018–2020	Hartlepool United	67	(4)
2020–2022	Luton Town	17	(0)
2020–2021	→ Bolton Wanderers (loan)	13	(3)
2021	→ Northampton Town (loan)	20	(3)
2021–2022	→ Milton Keynes Dons (loan)	18	(4)
2022–2024	Rotherham United	23	(0)
2023–2024	→ Peterborough United (loan)	24	(1)
2024–	Oxford United	43	(0)
2025–2026	→ Peterborough United (loan)	31	(1)

International career^{‡}
2024–	DR Congo	1	(0)
- * Club domestic league appearances and goals as of 13:03, 22 November 2026 (UTC) ‡ National team caps and goals as of 21:35, 20 November 2024 (UTC)

Peter Kioso (born 15 August 1999) is a professional footballer who plays as a wing-back for EFL League One club Oxford United. Born in Ireland, he represents DR Congo internationally.

== Early life ==
Kioso was born in Swords, County Dublin. He and his family later moved to Milton Keynes, England in 2010.

== Club career ==
=== Early career ===
He played underage football as a schoolboy for Malahide United.

Kioso joined the academy of Milton Keynes Dons at the age of 14 and progressed to the club's under-18 side before being released in 2017. He had a brief spell with non-League Dunstable Town before joining National League club Hartlepool United where he remained for two seasons, making 70 appearances and scoring 4 goals. Kioso was named in Hartlepool's team of the decade for the 2010s.

=== Luton Town ===
On 22 January 2020, Kioso joined Championship club Luton Town for an undisclosed fee. Luton manager Graeme Jones said Kioso was "one for the future", and in March 2020 said he had been "impressed" by Kioso in training, and would consider giving him his debut. He made his Football League debut for Luton on 18 July 2020.

On 15 October 2020 he moved on loan to League Two club Bolton Wanderers. He made his debut two days later in a 2–1 home defeat against Oldham Athletic. Two days after that he scored Bolton's first goal in a 3–3 draw against Barrow. On 11 January 2021 Luton recalled Kioso from his loan after an injury to James Bree.

On 25 January 2021, Kioso joined League One side Northampton Town on loan for the remainder of the 2020–21 season. Kioso had already played for Luton and Bolton in the 2020–21 season, usually meaning he would not be able to sign for a third team as players can only play for two teams in one season – however FIFA changed the rules for that season to allow players to play for three teams, to alleviate the effects of the coronavirus pandemic on football.

He returned to his academy club Milton Keynes Dons on loan on 31 August 2021. Kioso scored his first goal since his return to the club on 18 September 2021 in a 4–1 away win over Gillingham. On 18 January 2022, Kioso was recalled to Luton from his loan.

=== Rotherham United ===
On 23 June 2022, it was announced that Kioso had signed for Championship club Rotherham United on a permanent basis.

On 18 July 2023, Kioso signed for League One club Peterborough United on a season-long loan deal. In September 2023, he was named club captain by manager Darren Ferguson, scoring his first goal for the club in his first match with the armband. Having continued to impress, he was recalled by Rotherham on 2 January 2024.

=== Oxford United ===
Kioso joined Oxford United for an undisclosed fee on 24 June 2024.

On 22 August 2025, Kioso returned to Peterborough United on loan until the end of the season.

== International career ==
On 4 October 2024, Kioso received his first international call-up for the DR Congo for two Africa Cup of Nations qualifiers against Tanzania. He made his debut on 19 November 2024 in an Africa Cup of Nations qualifier against Ethiopia at the Stade des Martyrs. He started the game and was substituted at half-time, as Ethiopia won 2–1.

== Personal life ==
Kioso's parents are from DR Congo. His brother Gedeon is also a footballer; the two played together at Dunstable Town, with Peter at right back and his brother at left back. His cousin Pelly-Ruddock Mpanzu is also a footballer; the two played together at Luton Town.

== Career statistics ==
As of match played 21 November 2026

Appearances and goals by club, season and competition
Club	Season	League			FA Cup		League Cup		Other		Total	
Club	Season	Division	Apps	Goals	Apps	Goals	Apps	Goals	Apps	Goals	Apps	Goals
Hartlepool United	2018–19	National League	39	1	1	0	0	0	1 (Note: Appearance in FA Trophy)	0	41	1
Hartlepool United	2019–20	National League	28	3	3	0	0	0	1	0	32	3
Hartlepool United	Total		67	4	4	0	0	0	2	0	73	4
Luton Town	2019–20	Championship	1	0	0	0	0	0	0	0	1	0
Luton Town	2020–21	Championship	0	0	0	0	2	0	0	0	2	0
Luton Town	2021–22	Championship	16	0	2	0	1	0	0	0	19	0
Luton Town	Total		17	0	2	0	3	0	0	0	22	0
Bolton Wanderers (loan)	2020–21	League Two	13	3	1	0	0	0	0	0	14	3
Northampton Town (loan)	2020–21	League One	20	3	0	0	0	0	0	0	20	3
Milton Keynes Dons (loan)	2021–22	League One	18	4	0	0	—		1 (Note: Appearance(s) in EFL Trophy)	0	19	4
Rotherham United	2022–23	Championship	11	0	1	0	1	0	—		13	0
Rotherham United	2023–24	Championship	12	0	0	0	0	0	—		12	0
Rotherham United	Total		23	0	1	0	1	0	0	0	25	0
Peterborough United (loan)	2023–24	League One	24	1	1	0	2	0	0	0	27	1
Oxford United	2024–25	Championship	30	0	1	0	2	0	—		33	0
Oxford United	2025–26	Championship	0	0	0	0	0	0	—		0	0
Oxford United	2026–27	League One	13	0	0	0	1	0	2	0	16	0
Oxford United	Total		43	0	1	0	3	0	2	0	49	0
Peterborough United (loan)	2025–26	League One	31	1	1	0	0	0	0	0	32	1
Career total			255	16	11	0	9	0	5	0	280	16

== Honours ==
Bolton Wanderers

- EFL League Two third-place promotion: 2020–21
