= 2020–21 Luton Town F.C. season =

English football club season

Luton Town F.C.
2020–21 season
- Owner: Luton Town Football Club 2020 Limited
- Chairman: David Wilkinson
- Manager: Nathan Jones
- Stadium: Kenilworth Road
- Championship: 12th
- FA Cup: Fourth round (eliminated by Chelsea)
- EFL Cup: Third round (eliminated by Manchester United)
- Top goalscorer: League: James Collins (10); All: James Collins (13)
Home colours	Away colours	Third colours

The 2020–21 season was the 135th in the history of Luton Town Football Club, a professional association football club based in Luton, Bedfordshire, England. Their 19th-place finish in 2019–20 meant it was the club's second consecutive season in the Championship and 95th season in the English Football League. Luton were eliminated in the third round of the 2020–21 EFL Cup, after being beaten 3–0 at home to Premier League club Manchester United, and lost 3–1 away to Chelsea, also of the Premier League, in the FA Cup fourth round.

== Background and pre-season ==
The 2019–20 season was Luton Town's first season back in the Championship after a 12-year absence, having won the League One title in 2018–19. Manager Graeme Jones had his contract terminated by mutual consent in April 2020 with Luton in 23rd place, as part of a restructure of the club's football department to reduce its cost base, after professional football in England was suspended in March due to the COVID-19 pandemic. With nine matches remaining in the 2019–20 Championship season and the club six points from safety, Nathan Jones was reappointed manager in May, after leaving Stoke City in November 2019. The season resumed in June, and despite being in the relegation zone with one match remaining, Jones led Luton to safety from relegation with a 19th-place finish, after a 3–2 home win over Blackburn Rovers on the final day of the season.

At the end of the 2019–20 season, Luton released Jacob Butterfield and Callum McManaman, while Luke Berry, Danny Hylton, Elliot Lee, Kazenga LuaLua and Glen Rea were retained with new contracts. Luton made four pre-season signings, including defenders James Bree from Aston Villa, Tom Lockyer from Charlton Athletic, Rhys Norrington-Davies on loan from Sheffield United, and midfielder Jordan Clark from Accrington Stanley.

Pre-season match details
Date	Opponents	Venue	Result	Score F–A	Scorers	Attendance	Ref.
15 August 2020	Berkhamsted	A	W	9–0	Neufville 11', Hylton (3) 16', 39' pen., 40', Bradley 23', Moncur 51', Collins (3) 60', 67', 84'	0	
22 August 2020	Stevenage	A	W	1–0	Cornick 79'	0	
25 August 2020	Wealdstone	A	W	3–0	LuaLua 9', Clark 34', Shinnie 50'	0	
29 August 2020	Northampton Town	A	W	3–0	Collins 62', LuaLua 77', Cranie 81'	0	

== Competitions ==
=== EFL Championship ===
EFL Championship match details
Date	League position	Opponents	Venue	Result	Score F–A	Scorers	Attendance	Ref.
12 September 2020	6th	Barnsley	A	W	1–0	Collins 71'	0	
19 September 2020	2nd	Derby County	H	W	2–1	Berry 34', Clark 87'	0	
26 September 2020	6th	Watford	A	L	0–1		0	
3 October 2020	5th	Wycombe Wanderers	H	W	2–0	Mpanzu 59', Lee 89'	0	
17 October 2020	6th	Stoke City	H	L	0–2		0	
20 October 2020	10th	Millwall	A	L	0–2		0	
24 October 2020	9th	Sheffield Wednesday	A	W	1–0	Mpanzu 74'	0	
28 October 2020	9th	Nottingham Forest	H	D	1–1	Rea 22'	0	
31 October 2020	13th	Brentford	H	L	0–3		0	
4 November 2020	9th	Rotherham United	A	W	1–0	Collins 70'	0	
7 November 2020	10th	Huddersfield Town	A	D	1–1	Moncur 21'	0	
21 November 2020	10th	Blackburn Rovers	H	D	1–1	Berry 69'	0	
24 November 2020	9th	Birmingham City	H	D	1–1	Pearson 37'	0	
28 November 2020	12th	Cardiff City	A	L	0–4		0	
2 December 2020	11th	Norwich City	H	W	3–1	Moncur 15', Pearson 22', Collins 47' pen.	1,000	
5 December 2020	12th	Swansea City	A	L	0–2		0	
8 December 2020	13th	Coventry City	A	D	0–0		0	
12 December 2020	11th	Preston North End	H	W	3–0	Collins (3) 20', 29', 66'	2,000	
16 December 2020	13th	Middlesbrough	A	L	0–1		0	
19 December 2020	14th	AFC Bournemouth	H	D	0–0		0	
26 December 2020	15th	Reading	A	L	1–2	LuaLua 90'	0	
29 December 2020	13th	Bristol City	H	W	2–1	Rea 17', Dewsbury-Hall 68'	0	
12 January 2021	14th	Queens Park Rangers	H	L	0–2		0	
16 January 2021	12th	AFC Bournemouth	A	W	1–0	Dewsbury-Hall 67'	0	
20 January 2021	13th	Brentford	A	L	0–1		0	
30 January 2021	13th	Blackburn Rovers	A	L	0–1		0	
6 February 2021	15th	Huddersfield Town	H	D	1–1	Collins 11'	0	
13 February 2021	14th	Birmingham City	A	W	1–0	Potts 31'	0	
16 February 2021	15th	Cardiff City	H	L	0–2		0	
20 February 2021	16th	Stoke City	A	L	0–3		0	
23 February 2021	17th	Millwall	H	D	1–1	Adebayo 55'	0	
27 February 2021	14th	Sheffield Wednesday	H	W	3–2	Naismith 50', Tunnicliffe 58', Adebayo 86'	0	
2 March 2021	13th	Nottingham Forest	A	W	1–0	Tunnicliffe 64'	0	
6 March 2021	14th	Norwich City	A	L	0–3		0	
13 March 2021	16th	Swansea City	H	L	0–1		0	
16 March 2021	13th	Coventry City	H	W	2–0	Bree 23', Adebayo 42' pen.	0	
20 March 2021	13th	Preston North End	A	W	1–0	Iversen 83' o.g.	0	
2 April 2021	13th	Derby County	A	L	0–2		0	
5 April 2021	13th	Barnsley	H	L	1–2	Collins 83'	0	
10 April 2021	13th	Wycombe Wanderers	A	W	3–1	Moncur 80', LuaLua 85', Adebayo 88'	0	
17 April 2021	13th	Watford	H	W	1–0	Collins 78' pen.	0	
21 April 2021	12th	Reading	H	D	0–0		0	
25 April 2021	11th	Bristol City	A	W	3–2	Collins 59', Adebayo 68', Cornick 74'	0	
1 May 2021	12th	Middlesbrough	H	D	1–1	Rea 19'	0	
4 May 2021	12th	Rotherham United	H	D	0–0		0	
8 May 2021	12th	Queens Park Rangers	A	L	1–3	Dewsbury-Hall 43'	0	

==== League table ====
Pos	Team	Pld	W	D	L	GF	GA	GD	Pts
9	Queens Park Rangers	46	19	11	16	57	55	+2	68
10	Middlesbrough	46	18	10	18	55	53	+2	64
11	Millwall	46	15	17	14	47	52	−5	62
12	Luton Town	46	17	11	18	41	52	−11	62
13	Preston North End	46	18	7	21	49	56	−7	61
14	Stoke City	46	15	15	16	50	52	−2	60
15	Blackburn Rovers	46	15	12	19	65	54	+11	57

Source: EFL Official Website
Rules for classification: 1) Points; 2) Goal difference; 3) Number of goals scored; 4) Head-to-head results; 5) Wins; 6) Away goals; 7) Penalty points (sec 9.5); 8) 12-point sending off offences

==== Results summary ====
Overall								Home						Away					
Pld	W	D	L	GF	GA	GD	Pts	W	D	L	GF	GA	GD	W	D	L	GF	GA	GD
46	17	11	18	41	52	−11	62	8	9	6	25	23	+2	9	2	12	16	29	−13

Last updated: end of season.

=== FA Cup ===
FA Cup match details
Round	Date	Opponents	Venue	Result	Score F–A	Scorers	Attendance	Ref.
Third round	9 January 2021	Reading	H	W	1–0	Moncur 30'	0	
Fourth round	24 January 2021	Chelsea	A	L	1–3	Clark 30'	0	

=== EFL Cup ===
EFL Cup match details
Round	Date	Opponents	Venue	Result	Score F–A	Scorers	Attendance	Ref.
First round	5 September 2020	Norwich City	H	W	3–1	Collins (3) 79' pen., 83', 90+5'	0	
Second round	15 September 2020	Reading	A	W	1–0	Clark 24'	0	
Third round	22 September 2020	Manchester United	H	L	0–3		0	

== Transfers ==
=== In ===
Date	Player	Club†	Fee	Ref.
5 August 2020	Jordan Clark	(Accrington Stanley)	Free	
1 September 2020	James Bree	Aston Villa	Undisclosed	
1 September 2020	Tom Lockyer	(Charlton Athletic)	Free	
15 October 2020	Joe Morrell	Bristol City	Undisclosed	
18 November 2020	Gabriel Osho	(Reading)	Free	
15 January 2021	Kal Naismith	(Wigan Athletic)	Free	
1 February 2021	Elijah Adebayo	Walsall	Undisclosed	

† Brackets around club names indicate the player's contract with that club had expired before he joined Luton.

=== Out ===
Date	Player	Club†	Fee	Ref.
19 February 2021	Andrew Shinnie	Charlton Athletic	Free	
19 May 2021	James Collins	(Cardiff City)	Free	
30 June 2021	Martin Cranie		Released	
30 June 2021	Brendan Galloway	(Plymouth Argyle)	Released	
30 June 2021	Harry Isted		Released	
30 June 2021	George Moncur	(Hull City)	Released	
30 June 2021	Kazenga LuaLua	(Gençlerbirliği)	Released	
30 June 2021	Tiernan Parker		Released	
30 June 2021	Matty Pearson	(Huddersfield Town)	Free	
30 June 2021	Ryan Tunnicliffe	(Portsmouth)	Free	

† Brackets around club names indicate the player joined that club after his Luton contract expired.

=== Loan in ===
Date	Player	Club	Return	Ref.
3 September 2020	Rhys Norrington-Davies	Sheffield United	Recalled 12 January 2021	
16 October 2020	Kiernan Dewsbury-Hall	Leicester City	End of season	
16 October 2020	Sam Nombe	Milton Keynes Dons	End of season	
1 February 2021	Tom Ince	Stoke City	End of season	

=== Loan out ===
Date	Player	Club	Return	Ref.
11 September 2020	Harry Isted	Wealdstone	Recalled 30 November 2020	
29 September 2020	Tiernan Parker	Hitchin Town	One month	
15 October 2020	Peter Kioso	Bolton Wanderers	Recalled 11 January 2021	
16 October 2020	Andrew Shinnie	Charlton Athletic	19 February 2021	
1 December 2020	Josh Neufville	Yeovil Town	End of season	
1 December 2020	Gabriel Osho	Yeovil Town	Recalled 2 January 2021	
21 January 2021	Gabriel Osho	Rochdale	End of season	
25 January 2021	Peter Kioso	Northampton Town	End of season	
30 January 2021	Harry Isted	Wealdstone	Recalled 5 April 2021	
1 February 2021	Elliot Lee	Oxford United	End of season	

== Appearances and goals ==
Numbers in parentheses denote appearances as substitute.
Players with names struck through and marked † left the club during the playing season.
Players with names in italics and marked * were on loan from another club for the whole of their season with Luton.
Players listed with no appearances have been in the matchday squad but only as unused substitutes.
Key to positions: GK – Goalkeeper; DF – Defender; MF – Midfielder; FW – Forward

Players included in matchday squads
No.	Pos.	Nat.	Name	League		FA Cup		EFL Cup		Total		Discipline	
No.	Pos.	Nat.	Name	Apps	Goals	Apps	Goals	Apps	Goals	Apps	Goals	A yellow rectangle, denoting the yellow penalty card shown to a player being cautioned	A red rectangle, denoting the red penalty card shown to a player being sent off
1	GK	ENG	James Shea	7	0	0	0	3	0	10	0	1	0
2	DF	ENG	Martin Cranie	20 (3)	0	0	0	1 (1)	0	21 (4)	0	5	0
3	DF	ENG	Dan Potts	20 (4)	1	1 (1)	0	0	0	21 (5)	1	2	0
4	MF	ENG	Ryan Tunnicliffe	17 (7)	2	2	0	2	0	21 (7)	2	2	0
5	DF	ENG	Sonny Bradley	36 (1)	0	1	0	3	0	40 (1)	0	7	0
6	DF	ENG	Matty Pearson	38 (2)	2	0	0	1	0	39 (2)	2	5	1
7	FW	ENG	Harry Cornick	28 (12)	1	1	0	1 (1)	0	30 (13)	1	1	0
8	MF	ENG	Luke Berry	22 (9)	2	0 (2)	0	1	0	23 (11)	2	4	0
9	FW	ENG	Danny Hylton	6 (10)	0	1	0	2	0	9 (10)	0	5	0
10	FW	ENG	Elliot Lee	8 (4)	1	1	0	1 (2)	0	10 (6)	1	0	0
~~11~~	MF	SCO	~~Andrew Shinnie~~ †	0	0	0	0	2	0	2	0	0	0
12	GK	CRO	Simon Sluga	39	0	2	0	0	0	41	0	1	0
14	MF	ENG	George Moncur	10 (11)	3	1 (1)	1	2	0	13 (12)	4	0	0
15	DF	WAL	Tom Lockyer	18 (2)	0	1	0	2	0	21 (2)	0	0	1
16	MF	IRL	Glen Rea	33 (7)	3	1	0	1	0	35 (7)	3	11	0
17	MF	ENG	Pelly Ruddock Mpanzu	38 (6)	2	1	0	1	0	40 (6)	2	4	0
18	MF	ENG	Jordan Clark	23 (11)	1	1 (1)	1	2 (1)	1	26 (13)	3	1	0
19	FW	IRL	James Collins	29 (13)	10	0 (1)	0	1	3	30 (14)	13	4	0
20	DF	IRL	Peter Kioso	0	0	0	0	1 (1)	0	1 (1)	0	1	0
21	GK	ENG	Harry Isted	0	0	0	0	0	0	0	0	0	0
22	MF	ENG	Kiernan Dewsbury-Hall *	36 (3)	3	1	0	0	0	37 (3)	3	3	0
23	DF	ENG	Brendan Galloway	0	0	1	0	0	0	1	0	0	0
~~24~~	DF	WAL	~~Rhys Norrington-Davies~~ * †	16 (2)	0	0 (1)	0	3	0	19 (3)	0	2	0
24	MF	SCO	Kal Naismith	17 (5)	1	1	0	0	0	18 (5)	1	1	0
25	MF	DRC	Kazenga LuaLua	5 (18)	2	0 (2)	0	2 (1)	0	7 (21)	2	3	0
26	DF	ENG	James Bree	16 (8)	1	2	0	1	0	19 (8)	1	0	0
27	FW	ENG	Sam Nombe *	1 (10)	0	1	0	0	0	2 (10)	0	1	0
28	MF	WAL	Joe Morrell	5 (5)	0	1	0	0	0	6 (5)	0	0	0
29	FW	ENG	Elijah Adebayo	15 (3)	5	0	0	0	0	15 (3)	5	0	0
30	MF	ENG	Dion Pereira	0 (1)	0	0	0	0	0	0 (1)	0	0	0
33	MF	ENG	Sam Beckwith	0	0	0	0	0	0	0	0	0	0
38	DF	ENG	Gabriel Osho	0	0	1	0	0	0	1	0	0	0
39	MF	ENG	Tom Ince *	3 (4)	0	0	0	0	0	3 (4)	0	0	0

Players not included in matchday squads
No.	Pos.	Nat.	Name
31	GK	NIR	Tiernan Parker
32	DF	ENG	Avan Jones
34	MF	ENG	Jake Peck
35	DF	ENG	Corey Panter
37	FW	ENG	Josh Neufville
