= Danny Potts =

Danny Potts may refer to:

- Dan Potts (footballer) (born 1994), English footballer
- Danny Potts, child actor in the 1984 film Greystoke: The Legend of Tarzan, Lord of the Apes
