= Harry Cornick =

English footballer (born 1995)

- Cornick with AFC Wimbledon in 2026

Personal information
- Full name: Harry Charles Frederick Cornick
- Date of birth: 9 April 1995 (age 31)
- Place of birth: Poole, England
- Height: 5 ft 9 in (1.75 m)
- Positions: Right winger; centre-forward

Team information
- Current team: AFC Wimbledon

Youth career
- Christchurch

Senior career*
Years	Team	Apps	(Gls)
2012–2013	Christchurch	33	(17)
2013–2017	AFC Bournemouth	0	(0)
2014	→ Welling United (loan)	5	(1)
2014	→ Aldershot Town (loan)	2	(0)
2015	→ Havant & Waterlooville (loan)	7	(2)
2015–2016	→ Yeovil Town (loan)	21	(5)
2016	→ Yeovil Town (loan)	15	(2)
2016–2017	→ Leyton Orient (loan)	11	(1)
2017–2023	Luton Town	211	(34)
2023–2026	Bristol City	60	(4)
2026	→ Stevenage (loan)	8	(1)
2026–	AFC Wimbledon	4	(0)
- * Club domestic league appearances and goals as of 1 November 2026 (UTC)

Harry Charles Frederick Cornick (born 9 April 1995) is an English professional footballer who plays as a right winger or centre-forward for EFL League One club AFC Wimbledon.

He started his career at Christchurch before joining AFC Bournemouth in 2013. While at Bournemouth, he had numerous loans at clubs across the National League, League Two and League One before joining Luton for an undisclosed fee in 2017. He moved to Bristol City in January 2023.

== Career ==
=== AFC Bournemouth ===
Cornick began his career with non-league Christchurch, scoring 17 goals in 33 Wessex League appearances, and joined AFC Bournemouth in September 2013 after a successful trial. Cornick went on loan to Conference Premier club Welling United in January 2014. He played five times for Welling scoring once in a 3–1 win away to Chester. He ended the season with a short loan spell at Aldershot Town.

Cornick made his professional debut for Bournemouth on 3 January 2015 in a 5–1 FA Cup victory over Rotherham United. In February 2015, Cornick went on loan to Havant & Waterlooville.

On 7 August 2015, Cornick joined League Two club Yeovil Town on a one-month loan. He made his debut the following day in a 3–2 defeat against Exeter City, scoring with his first touch after coming on as a half-time substitute.

On 26 July 2016, Cornick joined Leyton Orient on a six-month loan.

On 31 January 2017, Cornick joined Gillingham on loan until the end of the season.

=== Luton Town ===
On 8 August 2017, Cornick signed for League Two club Luton Town on a two-year contract for an undisclosed fee, with the option of a further year. His contract was extended by a further year at the end of the 2017–18 season after a promotion clause was triggered as a result of Luton's promotion to League One.

Cornick signed a new long-term contract with Luton in July 2019.

=== Bristol City ===
On 31 January 2023, Cornick signed for Championship club Bristol City on a three-and-a-half-year contract for an undisclosed fee.

==== Loan to Stevenage ====
On 17 January 2026, Cornick signed with EFL League One club Stevenage on a loan until the end of the 2025–26 season.

Cornick was released by Bristol City at the end of the 2025–26 season.

=== AFC Wimbledon ===
On 25 August 2026, Cornick joined EFL League One club AFC Wimbledon on a one-year deal with an option to extend.

== Career statistics ==
As of 17 February 2026

Appearances and goals by club, season and competition
Club	Season	League			FA Cup		League Cup		Other		Total	
Club	Season	Division	Apps	Goals	Apps	Goals	Apps	Goals	Apps	Goals	Apps	Goals
AFC Bournemouth	2013–14	Championship	0	0	0	0	0	0	—		0	0
AFC Bournemouth	2014–15	Championship	0	0	1	0	0	0	—		1	0
AFC Bournemouth	2015–16	Premier League	0	0	—		—		—		0	0
AFC Bournemouth	2016–17	Premier League	0	0	0	0	—		—		0	0
AFC Bournemouth	Total		0	0	1	0	0	0	—		1	0
Welling United (loan)	2013–14	Conference Premier	5	1	—		—		—		5	1
Aldershot Town (loan)	2013–14	Conference Premier	2	0	—		—		—		2	0
Havant & Waterlooville (loan)	2014–15	Conference South	7	2	—		—		2 (Note: Appearances in Conference South play-offs)	0	9	2
Yeovil Town (loan)	2015–16	League Two	36	7	1	0	1	0	4 (Note: Appearances in EFL Trophy)	1	42	8
Leyton Orient (loan)	2016–17	League Two	11	1	—		1	0	1	0	13	1
Gillingham (loan)	2016–17	League One	6	0	—		—		—		6	0
Luton Town	2017–18	League Two	37	5	2	0	0	0	2	0	41	5
Luton Town	2018–19	League One	32	6	2	2	1	0	2	0	37	8
Luton Town	2019–20	Championship	45	9	1	0	2	0	—		48	9
Luton Town	2020–21	Championship	40	1	1	0	2	0	—		43	1
Luton Town	2021–22	Championship	38	12	2	1	1	0	2 (Note: Appearances in EFL Championship play-offs)	0	43	13
Luton Town	2022–23	Championship	19	1	3	1	1	0	—		23	2
Luton Town	Total		211	34	11	4	7	0	6	0	235	38
Bristol City	2022–23	Championship	17	1	—		—		—		17	1
Bristol City	2023–24	Championship	39	2	4	0	2	1	—		45	3
Bristol City	2024–25	Championship	3	1	0	0	1	0	1	0	5	1
Bristol City	2025–26	Championship	1	0	0	0	0	0	—		1	0
Bristol City	Total		60	4	4	0	3	1	1	0	68	5
Stevenage (loan)	2025–26	League One	8	1	—		—		0	0	8	1
Career total			346	50	17	3	12	1	14	1	389	55

== Honours ==
Luton Town

- EFL League Two runner-up: 2017–18
- EFL League One: 2018–19
