= Glen Rea =

Footballer (born 1994)

Personal information
- Full name: Glen Charles Rea
- Date of birth: 3 September 1994 (age 32)
- Place of birth: Brighton, England
- Height: 6 ft 0 in (1.84 m)
- Positions: Defensive midfielder; centre-back

Team information
- Current team: Burgess Hill Town

Youth career
- –2013: Brighton & Hove Albion

Senior career*
Years	Team	Apps	(Gls)
2013–2016	Brighton & Hove Albion	0	(0)
2015–2016	→ Southend United (loan)	14	(0)
2016	→ Luton Town (loan)	10	(0)
2016–2023	Luton Town	174	(7)
2019	→ Woking (loan)	7	(0)
2022	→ Wigan Athletic (loan)	3	(0)
2023	→ Cheltenham Town (loan)	14	(0)
2023	Worthing	5	(0)
2024–2025	Worthing	37	(4)
2025–	Burgess Hill Town	0	(0)

International career
2014–2016	Republic of Ireland U21	10	(1)
- * Club domestic league appearances and goals as of 11:31, 4 October 2025 (UTC)

Glen Charles Rea (born 3 September 1994) is a semi-professional footballer who plays as a defensive midfielder or centre-back for Isthmian League Premier Division club Burgess Hill Town. Born in England, he played for the Republic of Ireland U21 national team.

== Club career ==
=== Brighton & Hove Albion ===
Born in Brighton, East Sussex, Rea began his career with the youth system at Brighton & Hove Albion, before earning a professional contract after completing his two-year scholarship. On 6 February 2015, Rea signed a contract extension, keeping him at the club until 2016.

Ahead of the 2015–16 season, Rea was given squad number 26, before making his professional debut for Brighton one week later in a 1–0 win away to Southend United in the League Cup first round, with Rea playing for the full 90 minutes. Following the expiration of his loan spells at Southend United and Luton Town, Brighton activated the option of a one-year extension on Rea's contract, but were willing to let him leave on a permanent transfer. Southend and Luton both expressed an interest in signing him on a permanent basis.

==== Southend United (loan) ====
On 27 August 2015, two weeks after the League Cup fixture, Southend manager Phil Brown expressed an interest in signing Rea on loan, claiming later that day the club were close to signing him. Brighton confirmed Rea had joined Southend on loan until 2 January 2016 a day later. He made his debut in a 2–2 draw away to Coventry City on 31 August. Rea made his final appearance for Southend in a 3–0 defeat at home to Doncaster Rovers on 2 January 2016, finishing his loan spell with 16 appearances.

=== Luton Town ===
On 17 March 2016, Rea signed for League Two club Luton Town on loan until the end of the 2015–16 season, linking back up with Luton manager Nathan Jones who had previously been his first-team coach at Brighton. He made his Luton debut in a 1–0 win away to Plymouth Argyle two days later. Rea finished his loan spell with 10 appearances and started every match.

Rea joined Luton permanently on 27 June 2016 on a two-year contract for an undisclosed fee. His first appearance after signing permanently came in a 3–0 win away to Plymouth Argyle on 6 August. Rea scored his first professional goal in a 2–1 defeat at home to Grimsby Town on 10 September.

He signed a new two-year contract with Luton at the end of May 2018. He suffered a partial tear of his cruciate ligament in a 2–0 win over Burton Albion on 22 December, which ruled him out for the rest of the season after making 27 appearances and scoring one goal. Rea joined National League club Woking on 25 October 2019 on a one-month loan to build up his match fitness.

==== Wigan Athletic (loan) ====
On 31 January 2022, Rea joined League One title chasers Wigan Athletic on loan until the end of the 2021–22 season. He was ruled out for the rest of the season after suffering a knee injury in a league game against Wimbledon, and returned to Luton on 17 March 2022.

==== Cheltenham Town (loan) ====
On 31 January 2023, Rea joined League One club Cheltenham Town on loan until the end of the season, remaining with Luton for a short time whilst he completed the rehabilitation from a knee injury.

On 1 September 2023, Rea departed Luton having had his contract terminated by mutual consent.

=== Worthing ===
On 24 October 2023, Rea joined National League South side Worthing on non-contract terms.

In December 2023, Rea informed manager Adam Hinshelwood of his decision to take a break from playing football, feeling that he wasn't in the right frame of mind to continue playing. He returned to Worthing in July 2024.

He departed the club by mutual consent in September 2025.

=== Burgess Hill Town ===
On 3 October 2025, Rea joined Isthmian League Premier Division club Burgess Hill Town.

== International career ==
Rea, who was born in England, is eligible to play for Republic of Ireland and was called up to the Republic of Ireland U21 squad on 13 November 2014. His debut came on 15 November in a 1–0 defeat to the United States, with Rea playing the match in midfield. Rea scored his first goal for the Republic of Ireland U21 on his second cap two days later, in a 2–2 draw with Russia.

== Career statistics ==
As of match played 8 February 2022

Appearances and goals by club, season and competition
Club	Season	League			FA Cup		League Cup		Other		Total	
Club	Season	Division	Apps	Goals	Apps	Goals	Apps	Goals	Apps	Goals	Apps	Goals
Brighton & Hove Albion	2014–15	Championship	0	0	0	0	0	0	—		0	0
Brighton & Hove Albion	2015–16	Championship	0	0	—		2	0	—		2	0
Brighton & Hove Albion	Total		0	0	0	0	2	0	—		2	0
Southend United (loan)	2015–16	League One	14	0	1	0	—		1 (Note: Appearance in Football League Trophy)	0	16	0
Luton Town (loan)	2015–16	League Two	10	0	—		—		—		10	0
Luton Town	2016–17	League Two	39	2	3	1	2	0	5 (Note: Three appearances in EFL Trophy, two in League Two play-offs)	0	49	3
Luton Town	2017–18	League Two	46	1	2	0	1	0	1 (Note: Appearance(s) in EFL Trophy)	0	50	1
Luton Town	2018–19	League One	22	1	2	0	1	0	2	0	27	1
Luton Town	2019–20	Championship	15	0	1	0	0	0	—		16	0
Luton Town	2020–21	Championship	40	3	1	0	1	0	—		42	3
Luton Town	2021–22	Championship	12	0	0	0	1	0	—		13	0
Luton Town	Total		184	7	9	1	6	0	8	0	207	8
Woking (loan)	2019–20	National League	7	0	—		—		0	0	7	0
Wigan Athletic (loan)	2021–22	League One	0	0	1	0	0	0	0	0	1	0
Career total			205	7	11	1	8	0	9	0	233	8

== Honours ==
Luton Town

- EFL League One: 2018–19
- EFL League Two second-place promotion: 2017–18
