= Dion Pereira =

Antiguan footballer (born 1999)

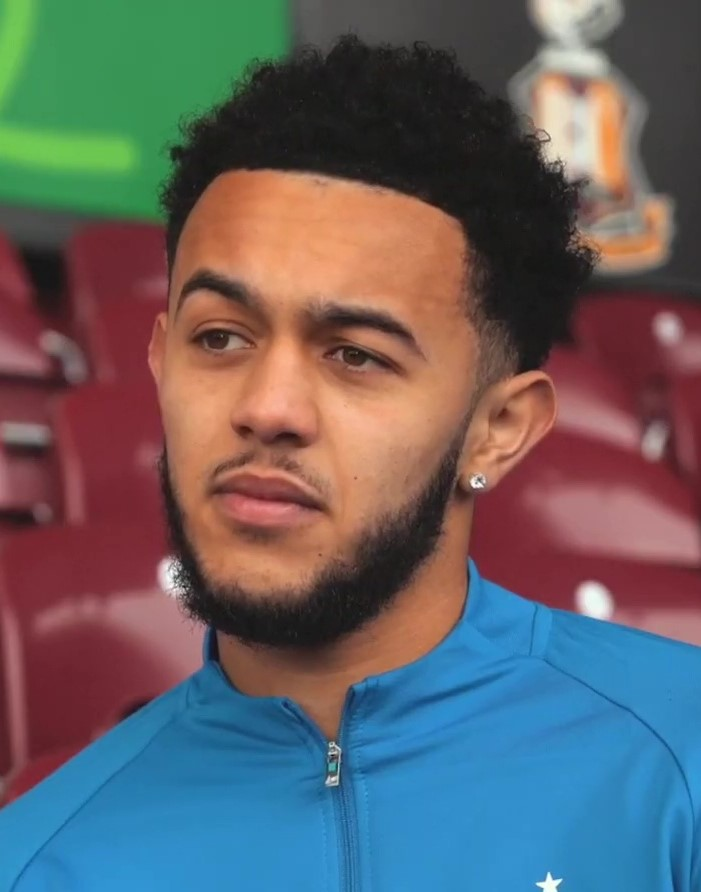
- Dion Pereira in 2022

Personal information
- Full name: Dion Enrico Pereira Greives
- Date of birth: 25 March 1999 (age 27)
- Place of birth: Watford, England
- Height: 1.80 m (5 ft 11 in)
- Position: Winger

Team information
- Current team: Crawley Town
- Number: 19

Youth career
- 2015–2017: Watford

Senior career*
Years	Team	Apps	(Gls)
2017–2019	Watford	2	(0)
2019	Atlanta United	18	(0)
2019	Atlanta United 2	5	(0)
2020–2025	Luton Town	1	(0)
2021	→ Yeovil Town (loan)	1	(0)
2022	→ Bradford City (loan)	10	(1)
2022–2023	→ Bradford City (loan)	14	(1)
2023–2024	→ Sutton United (loan)	14	(0)
2024	→ Dagenham & Redbridge (loan)	17	(3)
2024–2025	→ Dagenham & Redbridge (loan)	35	(10)
2025–	Crawley Town	15	(0)

International career
2023–	Antigua and Barbuda	9	(1)
- * Club domestic league appearances and goals as of 14:34, 2 January 2026 (UTC)

Dion Enrico Pereira Greives (born 25 March 1999) is a footballer who plays as a winger for EFL League Two side Crawley Town. Born in England, he plays for the Antigua and Barbuda national team.

== Club career ==
=== Watford ===
On 6 May 2017, Pereira made his senior debut for Watford in a 3–0 away defeat at Leicester City, coming on as a substitute in the 83rd minute for Mbaye Niang.

Pereira was awarded the Watford Young Player of the Season award for the 2016–17 season.

=== Atlanta United ===
On 15 January 2019, Pereira signed with MLS club Atlanta United. He later joined the club's affiliate side Atlanta United 2 and on 10 March 2019, made his debut for the side in the USL Championship in 2–0 win over Hartford Athletic.

Pereira was released by Atlanta before the start of their 2020 season.

=== Luton Town ===
On 3 November 2020, Pereira signed with Luton Town and joined the U23 team after 11 months without football.

On 8 October 2021, Pereira joined National League side Yeovil Town on a short-term loan deal. Pereira's loan with Yeovil Town was cut short after just one match after being recalled by Luton.

On 4 January 2022, Pereira joined League Two side Bradford City on loan until the end of the season. The move was assisted by Pereira's Luton teammate Carlos Mendes Gomes, who had been managed by Bradford City manager Derek Adams at Morecambe. On 1 September 2022, Pereira returned to Bradford City on loan until the end of the 2022–23 season.

On 1 September 2023, Pereira joined EFL League Two club Sutton United on a season-long loan.

On 27 January 2024, he joined National League side Dagenham & Redbridge on a loan until the end of the season. In June 2024, he returned to the Daggers on a season-long loan deal.

On 9 May 2025, it was announced that Dion Pereira would be released by Luton at the end of his contract.

=== Crawley Town ===
On 4 July 2025, Pereira signed for EFL League Two club Crawley Town on a free transfer.

== International career ==
Pereira made his debut for the Antigua and Barbuda national team against Bahamas on 14 October 2023.

== Personal life ==
Born in England, Pereira is of Brazilian, Trinidadian and Antiguan descent. He attended Queens' School in Bushey before dropping out in 2015.

== Career statistics ==
=== Club ===
As of match played 29 December 2025

Appearances and goals by club, season and competition
Club	Season	League			National Cup (Note: includes U.S. Open Cup, FA Cup)		League Cup (Note: includes EFL Cup)		Other		Total	
Club	Season	Division	Apps	Goals	Apps	Goals	Apps	Goals	Apps	Goals	Apps	Goals
Watford	2016–17	Premier League	2	0	0	0	0	0	—		2	0
Atlanta United	2019	Major League Soccer	18	0	2	0	—		1 (Note: Appearance in Campeones Cup)	0	21	0
Atlanta United 2	2019	USL Championship	5	0	—		—		—		5	0
Luton Town	2020–21	Championship	1	0	0	0	0	0	—		1	0
Luton Town	2021–22	Championship	0	0	0	0	1	0	—		1	0
Luton Town	2022–23	Championship	0	0	—		1	0	—		1	0
Luton Town	2023–24	Premier League	0	0	—		—		—		0	0
Luton Town	2024–25	Championship	0	0	—		0	0	—		0	0
Luton Town	Total		1	0	0	0	2	0	—		3	0
Yeovil Town (loan)	2021–22	National League	1	0	0	0	—		0	0	1	0
Bradford City (loan)	2021–22	League Two	10	1	—		—		—		10	1
Bradford City (loan)	2022–23	League Two	14	1	1	0	—		3 (Note: Appearance(s) in EFL Trophy)	0	18	1
Sutton United (loan)	2023–24	League Two	14	0	1	2	1	0	1	0	17	2
Dagenham & Redbridge (loan)	2023–24	National League	17	3	—		—		—		17	3
Dagenham & Redbridge (loan)	2024–25	National League	35	10	3	1	—		3 (Note: One appearance in FA Trophy, two in National League Cup)	1	41	12
Crawley Town	2025–26	League Two	15	0	1	0	0	0	0	0	16	0
Career total			132	15	8	3	3	0	8	1	151	19

=== International ===
As of match played 19 November 2024

Appearances and goals by national team and year
National team	Year	Apps	Goals
Antigua and Barbuda	2023	4	1
Antigua and Barbuda	2024	5	0
Total		9	1

As of match played 18 November 2023
Scores and results list Antigua and Barbuda's goal tally first, score column indicates score after each Pereira goal

List of international goals scored by Dion Pereira
No.	Date	Venue	Cap	Opponent	Score	Result	Competition	Ref.
1	18 November 2023	ABFA Technical Centre, Saint George, Antigua and Barbuda	3	Puerto Rico	1–1	2–3	2023–24 CONCACAF Nations League B	
