= Pelly Ruddock Mpanzu =

Congolese footballer (born 1994)

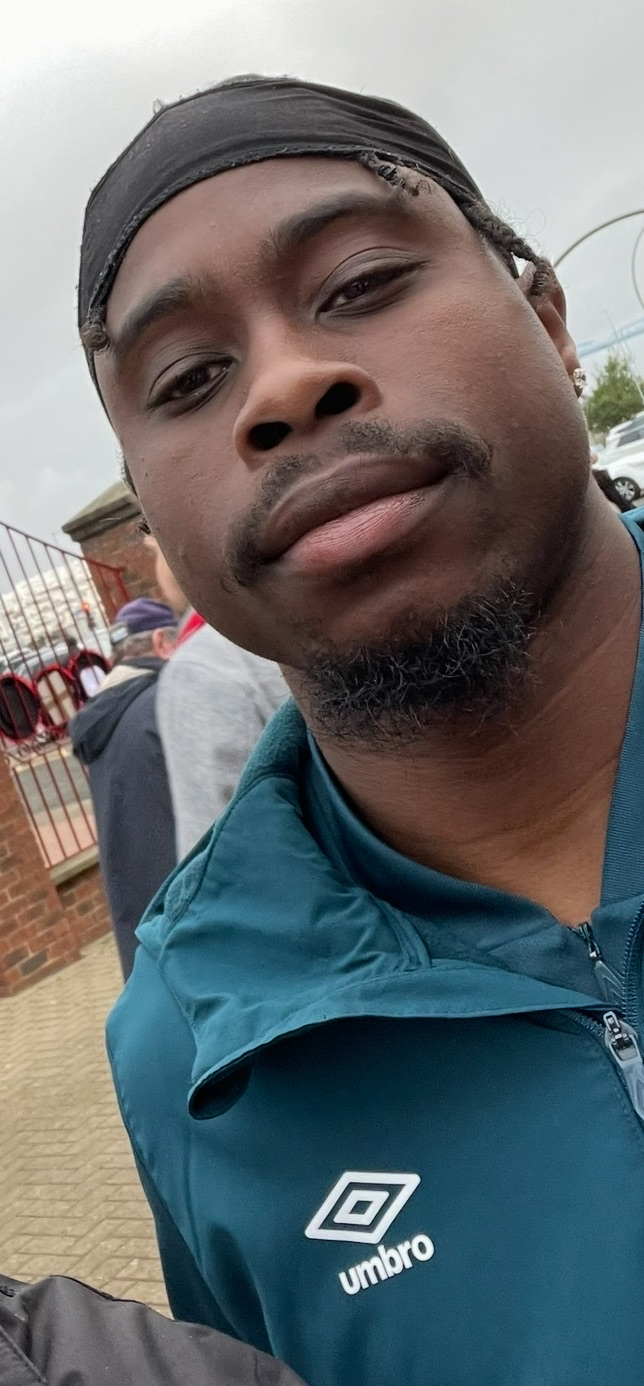
- Mpanzu with Luton Town in 2024

Personal information
- Full name: Pelly Ruddock Mpanzu
- Date of birth: 22 March 1994 (age 32)
- Place of birth: Hendon, England
- Height: 5 ft 9 in (1.75 m)
- Position: Central midfielder

Team information
- Current team: Cambridge United
- Number: 17

Youth career
- 2009–2011: Boreham Wood

Senior career*
Years	Team	Apps	(Gls)
2011	Boreham Wood	13	(0)
2011–2014	West Ham United	0	(0)
2013–2014	→ Luton Town (loan)	4	(0)
2014–2025	Luton Town	359	(23)
2025	→ Rotherham United (loan)	18	(1)
2025–	Cambridge United	59	(3)

International career^{‡}
2021	DR Congo	2	(0)
- * Club domestic league appearances and goals as of 08:27, 7 November 2026 (UTC) ‡ National team caps and goals as of 17:10, 12 May 2025 (UTC)

Pelly Ruddock Mpanzu (born 22 March 1994) is a professional footballer who plays as a central midfielder for EFL League One club Cambridge United. Born in England, he has represented the DR Congo national team.

In 2023, Mpanzu became the first footballer to climb from the non-league tiers of English football to the Premier League with the same club, having joined Luton Town in 2013, and remained with the club through their first Premier League season in 2023–24.

== Club career ==
=== Early career ===
Born in Hendon, Greater London, Mpanzu began his career with the youth system at Boreham Wood and made 13 first-team appearances.

=== West Ham United ===
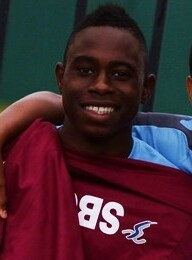
Mpanzu with West Ham United in 2014.

Mpanzu signed a two-and-a-half-year professional contract with Championship club West Ham United on 5 December 2011 after a successful trial. He was a member of the West Ham team which won the Ciutat de Barcelona Trophy against Espanyol in September 2013. Mpanzu made his first-team debut in a 2–0 win away to Burnley in the League Cup fourth round on 29 October 2013. West Ham manager Sam Allardyce said of his debut, "This was their big chance. Three players, all defenders, Pelly Ruddock Mpanzu, Dan Potts and Leo Chambers, can feel very proud of themselves, what they've done."

=== Luton Town ===
On 28 November 2013, Mpanzu signed for Conference Premier club Luton Town on loan until 4 January 2014. He made his Luton debut in central defence two days later in a 0–0 draw with Staines Town in the FA Trophy, and was named man of the match in the replay, which Luton won 2–0, while playing in central midfield. He played in central midfield for five further matches, all victories, before being recalled to West Ham's squad on 30 December due to his parent club's injury crisis. After impressing in his seven matches for Luton, manager John Still revealed that he was looking to bring Mpanzu back to Kenilworth Road. On 28 January 2014, Mpanzu signed for Luton permanently on a two-and-a-half-year contract for an undisclosed fee, in a transfer described as a "major coup". He scored his first goal for the club in a 7–0 win over Hereford United on 15 February 2014, before scoring his second two months later, a "scorching half-volley" in a 2–1 away win over Dartford. He finished 2013–14 with 24 appearances and two goals, as Luton won the Conference Premier title and promotion to League Two. Mpanzu said that his decision to leave West Ham and drop down the divisions had been "the right choice" as he had a winner's medal to justify it.

Mpanzu suffered numerous injuries, including a rare calcification of the hamstring muscle, over the course of 2014–15 and made 18 appearances, of which only 10 were in the starting lineup. He scored one goal during the campaign; an injury-time equaliser in a 1–1 draw with Bury.

He remained fit for most of the 2016–17 season, playing in 52 games in all competitions including both legs of the play-off semi-final, which Luton lost 6–5 on aggregate to Blackpool. Mpanzu signed a new three-year contract with Luton on 3 August 2017, with the option of a further year. In the following two seasons, he achieved two consecutive promotions with Luton to reach the Championship. In July 2021, he signed a new undisclosed-length deal to remain at the club.

On 28 January 2023, he played his 350th match with the club in a 2–2 draw against Grimsby Town in the FA Cup. With Luton Town's promotion to the Premier League secured after winning the 2023 EFL Championship play-off final against Coventry City, he became the first player to go from non-league to the Premier League with the same club. On 10 July 2023, he signed a new contract to extend his tenure at the club into the Premier League.

On 3 February 2025, Mpanzu joined League One side Rotherham United on loan for the remainder of the season.

Following Mpanzu's return from Rotherham United, Luton Town released him at the end of June.

=== Cambridge United ===
On 24 July 2025, Mpanzu joined EFL League Two club Cambridge United on a two-year deal.

== International career ==
Born in England, Mpanzu is of Congolese descent. He was called up to represent the DR Congo national team for a pair of friendlies in June 2021. He debuted with the DR Congo in a 1–0 friendly loss to Tunisia on 5 June 2021.

== Style of play ==
Mpanzu has been described as a "powerful" box-to-box midfielder with "endless energy". Mpanzu has stated that central midfield is his natural position, but that he is able to play as a centre-back.

== Personal life ==
His cousin Peter Kioso is also a footballer; the two played together at Luton Town.

== Career statistics ==
=== Club ===
As of match played 6 November 2026

Appearances and goals by club, season and competition
Club	Season	League			FA Cup		League Cup		Other		Total	
Club	Season	Division	Apps	Goals	Apps	Goals	Apps	Goals	Apps	Goals	Apps	Goals
Boreham Wood	2011–12	Conference South	13	0	0	0	—		0	0	13	0
West Ham United	2011–12	Championship	0	0	0	0	0	0	0	0	0	0
West Ham United	2012–13	Premier League	0	0	0	0	0	0	—		0	0
West Ham United	2013–14	Premier League	0	0	0	0	1	0	—		1	0
West Ham United	Total		0	0	0	0	1	0	0	0	1	0
Luton Town	2013–14	Conference Premier	21	2	0	0	—		3 (Note: Appearances in FA Trophy)	0	24	2
Luton Town	2014–15	League Two	16	1	1	0	1	0	0	0	18	1
Luton Town	2015–16	League Two	21	2	0	0	2	0	1 (Note: Appearance(s) in Football League/EFL Trophy)	0	24	2
Luton Town	2016–17	League Two	42	2	2	0	2	0	6 (Note: Four appearances in EFL Trophy, two in League Two play-offs)	0	52	2
Luton Town	2017–18	League Two	28	2	3	0	1	0	4	0	36	2
Luton Town	2018–19	League One	46	5	4	0	1	0	1	0	52	5
Luton Town	2019–20	Championship	44	3	0	0	2	0	—		46	3
Luton Town	2020–21	Championship	44	2	1	0	1	0	—		46	2
Luton Town	2021–22	Championship	34	1	1	0	0	0	—		35	1
Luton Town	2022–23	Championship	30	3	4	0	0	0	3 (Note: Appearances in the Championship play-offs)	0	37	3
Luton Town	2023–24	Premier League	27	0	3	0	2	0	—		32	0
Luton Town	2024–25	Championship	10	0	0	0	0	0	—		10	0
Luton Town	Total		363	23	19	0	12	0	18	0	412	23
Rotherham United (loan)	2024–25	League One	18	1	—		—		—		18	1
Cambridge United	2025–26	League Two	45	3	3	0	3	0	4	0	55	3
Cambridge United	2026–27	League One	14	0	1	0	2	0	2	2	19	2
Cambridge United	Total		59	3	4	0	5	0	6	2	74	5
Career total			453	27	23	0	18	0	24	2	518	29

=== International ===
Appearances and goals by national team and year
National team	Year	Apps	Goals
DR Congo	2021	2	0
Total		2	0

== Honours ==
Luton Town

- EFL Championship play-offs: 2023
- EFL League One: 2018–19
- EFL League Two second-place promotion: 2017–18
- Conference Premier: 2013–14

Individual

- Luton Town Player of the Season: 2019–20
