= Gabriel Osho =

English footballer (born 1998)

Personal information
- Full name: Gabriel Jeremiah Adedayo Osho
- Date of birth: 14 August 1998 (age 28)
- Place of birth: Reading, England
- Height: 1.85 m (6 ft 1 in)
- Position: Defender

Team information
- Current team: Cardiff City
- Number: 4

Youth career
- 2008–2016: Reading

Senior career*
Years	Team	Apps	(Gls)
2016–2020	Reading	7	(0)
2018	→ Maidenhead United (loan)	3	(0)
2018	→ Aldershot Town (loan)	8	(0)
2019	→ Bristol Rovers (loan)	0	(0)
2019–2020	→ Yeovil Town (loan)	6	(0)
2020–2024	Luton Town	71	(4)
2020–2021	→ Yeovil Town (loan)	4	(0)
2021	→ Rochdale (loan)	22	(1)
2024–2025	Auxerre	22	(1)
2025–	Cardiff City	29	(0)

International career^{‡}
2024–	Nigeria	2	(0)
- * Club domestic league appearances and goals as of 1 November 2026 (UTC) ‡ National team caps and goals as of 14 November 2024

Gabriel Jeremiah Adedayo Osho (born 14 August 1998) is a professional footballer who plays for EFL Championship club Cardiff City. Mainly a centre-back, Osho can be deployed as a full-back. Born in England, he represents the Nigeria national team.

== Early life and education ==
Born in Reading, Osho attended Leighton Park School in Reading and The Forest School in Winnersh.

== Club career ==
=== Reading ===
In July 2016, Osho signed his first professional deal with Reading, signing a new deal until the summer of 2020 on 3 January 2018.

After short loan spells at National League clubs Maidenhead United and Aldershot Town, Osho made his debut for Reading in a 0–1 defeat to Middlesbrough on 22 December 2018 earning man of the match.

On 29 January 2019, Osho joined Bristol Rovers on loan for the remainder of the 2018–19 season.

On 28 October 2019, Osho featured on trial for Ipswich Town U23's in their game against Coventry City.

On 7 December 2019, Osho joined National League side Yeovil Town on loan until 4 January 2020.

With his contract with Reading due to expire on 30 June 2020, and due to the effects of the COVID-19 pandemic on the 2019–20 season, Osho signed a short-term extension with Reading until the end of the season on 26 June 2020. Following the completion of the 2019–20 season, Osho was offered a new contract by Reading, but went on to decline the offer and leave the club.

In October 2020, he played for Salford City's development squad in a Central League match.

=== Luton Town ===
On 18 November 2020, Osho joined EFL Championship side Luton Town on a permanent deal. In December 2020, Osho rejoined National League side Yeovil Town on a one month loan deal.

On 21 January 2021, Osho joined Rochdale on loan until the end of the season.

Osho established himself as a first team player for Luton during the 2021–22 season, making 26 appearances. The following season, Osho scored in the Championship play-off semi-final against Sunderland as the team achieved promotion to the Premier League.

After missing the beginning of the 2023–24 season through injury, Osho made his Premier League debut in a 3–1 loss at Aston Villa on 29 October 2023. He scored his first Premier League goal in a 4–3 home defeat to Arsenal on 4 December.

On 24 May 2024, Luton said it was negotiating a new contract with the player.

=== Auxerre ===
On 11 July 2024, newly promoted Ligue 1 club Auxerre, announced the signing of Osho to a one-year contract, with the option of an additional two.

=== Cardiff City ===
On 29 August 2025, Osho joined League One club Cardiff City on a four-year deal for an undisclosed fee.

== International career ==
In March 2024, Osho was called up to the Nigerian national team for the first time, but did not make his debut due to injury. In November 2024, Osho was called up again and made his debut on 14 November 2024 in an Africa Cup of Nations qualifier against Benin.

== Personal life ==
Born in England, Osho is of Nigerian descent.

== Career statistics ==
As of 17 October 2026

Appearances and goals by club, season and competition
Club	Season	League			National cup (Note: Includes FA Cup, Coupe de France)		League cup (Note: Includes EFL Cup)		Other		Total	
Club	Season	Division	Apps	Goals	Apps	Goals	Apps	Goals	Apps	Goals	Apps	Goals
Reading	2016–17	Championship	0	0	0	0	0	0	—		0	0
Reading	2017–18	Championship	0	0	0	0	0	0	—		0	0
Reading	2018–19	Championship	2	0	0	0	0	0	—		2	0
Reading	2019–20	Championship	5	0	2	0	1	0	—		8	0
Reading	Total		7	0	2	0	1	0	—		10	0
Maidenhead United (loan)	2017–18	National League	3	0	0	0	—		—		3	0
Aldershot Town (loan)	2018–19	National League	8	0	3	0	—		—		11	0
Bristol Rovers (loan)	2018–19	League One	0	0	0	0	0	0	0	0	0	0
Yeovil Town (loan)	2019–20	National League	6	0	0	0	—		1 (Note: Appearance in FA Trophy)	0	7	0
Luton Town	2020–21	Championship	0	0	1	0	0	0	—		1	0
Luton Town	2021–22	Championship	23	0	2	0	1	0	—		26	0
Luton Town	2022–23	Championship	27	2	4	0	1	0	3 (Note: Appearances in Championship play-offs)	1	35	3
Luton Town	2023–24	Premier League	21	2	2	0	0	0	—		23	2
Luton Town	Total		71	4	9	0	2	0	3	1	85	5
Yeovil Town (loan)	2020–21	National League	4	0	0	0	—		0	0	4	0
Rochdale (loan)	2020–21	League One	22	1	—		—		—		22	1
Auxerre	2024–25	Ligue 1	20	1	1	0	—		—		21	1
Auxerre	2025–26	Ligue 1	2	0	0	0	—		—		2	0
Auxerre	Total		22	1	1	0	—		—		23	1
Cardiff City	2025–26	League One	19	0	0	0	1	0	2 (Note: Appearances in EFL Trophy)	0	22	0
Cardiff City	2026–27	Championship	9	0	0	0	1	0	0	0	10	0
Cardiff City	Total		28	0	0	0	2	0	2	0	32	0
Career total			162	6	15	0	4	0	6	1	187	7

== Honours ==
Luton Town

- EFL Championship play-offs: 2023
