= Brendan Galloway =

Zimbabwean footballer (born 1996)

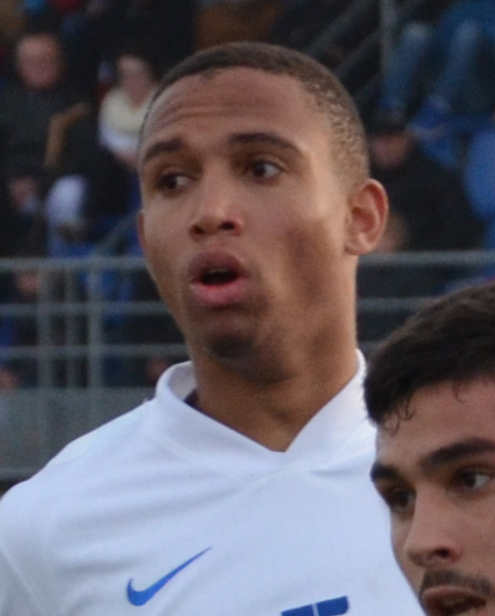
- Galloway playing for England U19s in 2015

Personal information
- Full name: Brendan Joel Zibusiso Galloway
- Date of birth: 17 March 1996 (age 30)
- Place of birth: Harare, Zimbabwe
- Height: 1.88 m (6 ft 2 in)
- Positions: Left-back; centre-back

Youth career
- 2006–2011: Milton Keynes Dons

Senior career*
| Years | Team | Apps | (Gls) |
| 2011–2014 | Milton Keynes Dons | 10 | (0) |
| 2014–2019 | Everton | 17 | (0) |
| 2016–2017 | → West Bromwich Albion (loan) | 3 | (0) |
| 2017–2018 | → Sunderland (loan) | 7 | (0) |
| 2019–2021 | Luton Town | 3 | (0) |
| 2021–2026 | Plymouth Argyle | 95 | (4) |

International career^{‡}
| 2012 | England U17 | 4 | (0) |
| 2013–2014 | England U18 | 3 | (0) |
| 2014–2015 | England U19 | 11 | (0) |
| 2016 | England U21 | 1 | (0) |
| 2021– | Zimbabwe | 7 | (0) |
- * Club domestic league appearances and goals as of 21 April 2026 (UTC) ‡ National team caps and goals as of 19:35, 13 November 2025 (UTC)

Brendan Joel Zibusiso Galloway (born 17 March 1996) is a Zimbabwean professional footballer who played as a defender for EFL League One club Plymouth Argyle. A former youth international for England, Galloway represents the Zimbabwe national team.

== Club career ==
=== Milton Keynes Dons ===
Brendan Galloway was born in Harare, Zimbabwe on 17 March 1996, and moved to England with his family when he was six years old. He started playing for Milton Keynes Dons when he joined the club's under-11 side.

He became the youngest first-team player in Milton Keynes Dons' history at 15 years of age after making his debut as a 79th-minute substitute in a 6–0 victory at home to Nantwich Town in the FA Cup first round on 12 November 2011. He made his league début after starting for MK Dons in a 2–1 victory at Rochdale on 28 April 2012. He scored his first senior goal for MK Dons in their 4–1 win over FC Halifax Town on 9 November 2013.

=== Everton ===
In August 2014 Everton signed Galloway for an undisclosed fee on a five-year contract. He spent the majority of the season playing for the under-21 side until the very latter stage of the league campaign. Galloway was given a chance and made his début for the senior side in Everton's 2–1 away win against West Ham United on 16 May 2015. He played at left back in the game, despite ordinarily being a centre-back. On the last day of the 2014–15 season, Galloway turned out for his senior home debut against Tottenham Hotspur.

On the opening day of the 2015–16 season, as regular left back Leighton Baines suffered an ankle injury in training and Luke Garbutt had joined Fulham on loan, Galloway started Everton's match against Watford.

Galloway agreed a new contract with Everton on 10 December 2015 and was at that time contracted to the club until at least June 2020.

==== Loan to West Bromwich Albion ====
On 22 August 2016, Galloway joined West Bromwich Albion on a season-long loan. Galloway made his first league start for West Brom on 28 August 2016 against Middlesbrough. On 10 April 2017, Galloway was recalled by Everton. It was reported that Galloway had been given permission to return to Everton early even though he remained registered with West Bromwich Albion who paid £1 million to take him on loan for the campaign.

=== Luton Town ===
On 3 July 2019, Galloway joined Luton Town for a free transfer from Everton. On 28 May 2021, Luton Town announced the departures of Galloway and several other players following the conclusion of their contracts

=== Plymouth Argyle ===
On 21 July 2021, after playing in several trial games in pre-season during the summer of 2021, Galloway joined Plymouth Argyle on a short-term contract until January 2022. On 14 August, Galloway made his league debut playing the full 90 minutes of a 1–0 win over Gillingham. He incurred an injury in October 2021 which ruled him out for the rest of the season but played sufficiently in the 2022-23 season to trigger an extension to his contract. In May 2024, Galloway signed a new two-year contract.

On 7 May 2026 the club announced he would be released in the summer when his contract expired.

== International career ==
Galloway is eligible to play for Zimbabwe or England. He was named in the England U-17 squad for the Nordic Under-17 Football Championship in 2012 by Kenny Swain. His first match for England was against the Faroe Islands in August 2012. He represented England in the 2014 UEFA Under-19 Championship qualifying campaign.

In 2016, Zimbabwe approached Galloway to play for them in the 2017 African Cup of Nations but Galloway chose to remain part of the England U21 set up. He formally represented Zimbabwe in a 1–0 2022 FIFA World Cup qualification loss to Ghana on 12 October 2021. During that match he played as a centre back, partnering Alec Mudimu, and Ghana struggled to break that defence.

On 11 December 2025, Galloway was called up to the Zimbabwe squad for the 2025 Africa Cup of Nations.

== Career statistics ==
=== Club ===
As of match played 21 April 2026

Appearances and goals by club, season and competition
| Club | Season | League | | | FA Cup | | League Cup | | Other | | Total | |
| Club | Season | Division | Apps | Goals | Apps | Goals | Apps | Goals | Apps | Goals | Apps | Goals |
|---|---|---|---|---|---|---|---|---|---|---|---|---|
| Milton Keynes Dons | 2011–12 | League One | 1 | 0 | 1 | 0 | 0 | 0 | 0 | 0 | 2 | 0 |
| Milton Keynes Dons | 2012–13 | League One | 1 | 0 | 1 | 0 | 0 | 0 | 0 | 0 | 2 | 0 |
| Milton Keynes Dons | 2013–14 | League One | 8 | 0 | 3 | 1 | 1 | 0 | 1 (Note: Appearance(s) in Football League Trophy) | 0 | 13 | 1 |
| Milton Keynes Dons | Total | | 10 | 0 | 5 | 1 | 1 | 0 | 1 | 0 | 17 | 1 |
| Everton | 2014–15 | Premier League | 2 | 0 | 0 | 0 | 0 | 0 | 0 | 0 | 2 | 0 |
| Everton | 2015–16 | Premier League | 15 | 0 | 2 | 0 | 2 | 0 | — | | 19 | 0 |
| Everton | 2016–17 | Premier League | 0 | 0 | — | | — | | — | | 0 | 0 |
| Everton | 2017–18 | Premier League | 0 | 0 | 0 | 0 | — | | 0 | 0 | 0 | 0 |
| Everton | 2018–19 | Premier League | 0 | 0 | 0 | 0 | 0 | 0 | — | | 0 | 0 |
| Everton | Total | | 17 | 0 | 2 | 0 | 2 | 0 | 0 | 0 | 21 | 0 |
| West Bromwich Albion (loan) | 2016–17 | Premier League | 3 | 0 | 1 | 0 | 1 | 0 | — | | 5 | 0 |
| Sunderland (loan) | 2017–18 | Championship | 7 | 0 | 0 | 0 | 1 | 0 | — | | 8 | 0 |
| Sunderland U21 (loan) | 2017–18 | — | | | — | | — | | 2 | 0 | 2 | 0 |
| Everton U21 | 2018–19 | — | | | — | | — | | 1 | 0 | 1 | 0 |
| Luton Town | 2019–20 | Championship | 3 | 0 | 0 | 0 | 2 | 0 | — | | 5 | 0 |
| Luton Town | 2020–21 | Championship | 0 | 0 | 1 | 0 | 0 | 0 | — | | 1 | 0 |
| Luton Town | Total | | 3 | 0 | 1 | 0 | 2 | 0 | — | | 6 | 0 |
| Plymouth Argyle | 2021–22 | League One | 14 | 2 | 1 | 0 | 1 | 0 | — | | 16 | 2 |
| Plymouth Argyle | 2022–23 | League One | 18 | 0 | 1 | 0 | 1 | 0 | 4 | 0 | 24 | 0 |
| Plymouth Argyle | 2023–24 | Championship | 26 | 0 | 3 | 1 | 0 | 0 | — | | 29 | 1 |
| Plymouth Argyle | 2024–25 | Championship | 13 | 0 | 0 | 0 | 1 | 0 | — | | 14 | 0 |
| Plymouth Argyle | 2025–26 | League One | 24 | 2 | 0 | 0 | — | | 2 | 1 | 26 | 3 |
| Plymouth Argyle | Total | | 95 | 4 | 5 | 1 | 3 | 0 | 6 | 1 | 109 | 6 |
| Career total | | | 135 | 4 | 14 | 2 | 10 | 0 | 10 | 1 | 169 | 7 |

=== International ===
As of match played 13 October 2025

Appearances and goals by national team and year
| National team | Year | Apps | Goals |
|---|---|---|---|
| Zimbabwe | 2021 | 2 | 0 |
| Zimbabwe | 2024 | 3 | 0 |
| Zimbabwe | 2025 | 1 | 0 |
| Total | | 6 | 0 |

== Honours ==
Everton U23s

- Premier League Cup: 2018–19

Plymouth Argyle

- EFL League One: 2022–23
- EFL Trophy runner-up: 2022–23

Individual

- Football League Apprentice of the Year: 2013–14 League One
