= Ryan Tunnicliffe =

English association football player

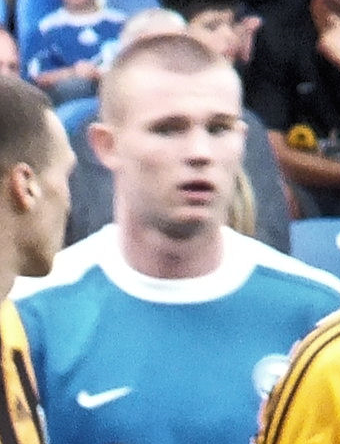
- Tunnicliffe playing for Peterborough United in 2011

Personal information
- Full name: Ryan Tunnicliffe
- Date of birth: 30 December 1992 (age 33)
- Place of birth: Heywood, England
- Height: 6 ft 0 in (1.83 m)
- Position: Midfielder

Team information
- Current team: King's Lynn Town

Youth career
- Manchester United

Senior career*
Years	Team	Apps	(Gls)
2009–2014	Manchester United	0	(0)
2011–2012	→ Peterborough United (loan)	27	(0)
2013	→ Barnsley (loan)	2	(0)
2013–2014	→ Ipswich Town (loan)	27	(0)
2014–2017	Fulham	59	(2)
2014	→ Wigan Athletic (loan)	5	(0)
2014	→ Blackburn Rovers (loan)	17	(1)
2017	→ Wigan Athletic (loan)	9	(1)
2017–2019	Millwall	51	(4)
2019–2021	Luton Town	64	(3)
2021–2023	Portsmouth	60	(3)
2023–2025	Adelaide United	23	(1)
2026–	King's Lynn Town	1	(1)

International career
2007–2008	England U16	8	(0)
2008–2009	England U17	10	(4)
- * Club domestic league appearances and goals as of 28 July 2026

Ryan Tunnicliffe (born 30 December 1992) is an English professional footballer who plays as a midfielder for National League North club King's Lynn Town.

Born in Heywood, Greater Manchester, he began his career with Manchester United but failed to break into the first team and joined Peterborough United, Barnsley and Ipswich Town on loan before making a permanent move to Fulham in January 2014. After loan spells with Wigan Athletic (twice) and Blackburn Rovers, Tunnicliffe left Fulham for Millwall in 2017. Two years later, he left for Luton Town. He has also played internationally for England at under-16 and under-17 levels.

== Club career ==
=== Manchester United ===
Born in Heywood, Greater Manchester, Tunnicliffe was first scouted by Manchester United at the age of nine, while playing for local side Roach Dynamos. He progressed through the Manchester United academy and signed as a scholar in July 2009. He turned professional in December the same year.

Tunnicliffe was a "key performer" as the United under-18 side won the FA Youth Cup in 2011. His performances that season earned him the club's Jimmy Murphy Young Player of the Year award.

==== Peterborough United (loan) ====
On 1 July 2011, Manchester United agreed for Tunnicliffe to spend a six-month loan spell at Peterborough United, alongside teammate Scott Wootton. He made his debut in the opening game of the season on 6 August in a 2–1 home win over Crystal Palace, coming on as a substitute for Lee Frecklington in the 87th minute. He then made his first start in a League Cup game against Stevenage and set up the opening goal for teammate David Ball.

=== Return to Manchester United ===
After returning from the loan spell at Peterborough United, Tunnicliffe was a regular in the Reserves and helped the team win two trophies at the end of the campaign, scoring his first goal for Warren Joyce's team at Chelsea.

Tunnicliffe made his senior Manchester United debut on 26 September 2012, when he came on as a substitute in the 2–1 League Cup win over Newcastle United; he came on in the 77th minute for Marnick Vermijl to win his father a bet that he had made 10 years earlier, with a return of £10,000.

==== Barnsley (loan) ====
On 21 February 2013, Barnsley signed Tunnicliffe on a 28-day loan after Scott Golbourne was ruled out for the rest of the season following knee surgery.

==== Ipswich Town (loan) ====
On 26 July 2013, Tunnicliffe joined Ipswich Town on a six-month loan. He was a regular in the Ipswich side throughout the first half of the 2013–14 season, but although manager Mick McCarthy expressed an interest in extending Tunnicliffe's loan deal, Tunnicliffe returned to Manchester United in January 2014.

=== Fulham ===
After just two appearances for the Manchester United first team, Tunnicliffe joined Fulham for an undisclosed fee on 31 January 2014, along with fellow Manchester United reserve midfielder Larnell Cole. There he was reunited with former Manchester United coach René Meulensteen, then in charge of Fulham. He made his debut for Fulham in a 2–2 draw against his former club Manchester United nine days later.

After Meulensteen's sacking as Fulham manager, Tunnicliffe and Cole were deemed by Meulensteen's successor Felix Magath to be surplus to requirements at the club, despite being played in every match eligible under Meulensteen. On 25 February 2014, just 25 days after signing for Fulham, Tunnicliffe joined Wigan Athletic on loan until the end of the season as cover for the injured Ben Watson. On 10 April, it was reported that Wigan manager Uwe Rösler had attempted to terminate Tunnicliffe's loan but Fulham refused to take the player back.

On 1 September 2014, Tunnicliffe joined Blackburn Rovers on a season-long loan deal. On 1 January 2015, he was called by his parent club thus ending the loan deal.

Tunnicliffe was given a two-match ban for the start of the 2015–16 season, a £5,000 fine and ordered to take an educational course after calling Middlesbrough's Patrick Bamford a "sausage boy" over Twitter.

=== Millwall ===
On 29 July 2017, Tunnicliffe signed with Millwall on a two-year deal following his release from Fulham. After appearing for 31 times in the 2018–19 season, he was released by Millwall in July 2019.

=== Luton Town ===
On 1 July 2019, Tunnicliffe became Luton Town's third signing since winning promotion to the Championship.

=== Portsmouth ===
Tunnicliffe agreed a two-year contract with League One club Portsmouth on 26 June 2021, with the option of a further year, effective once his Luton contract had expired at the end of that month. He scored his first goal for Portsmouth in a 1–0 win against Shrewsbury Town on 17 August 2021.

=== Adelaide United ===
On 19 September 2023, Tunnicliffe signed for a club abroad for the first time, joining Adelaide United on a two-year deal.

=== King's Lynn Town ===
On 28 July 2026, Tunnicliffe joined National League North club King's Lynn Town.

== International career ==
Tunnicliffe made his England under-16 debut in October 2007 at the age of 14, captaining the side to a 2–2 draw against Northern Ireland in the Victory Shield. He played for the under-16s a further seven times. In August 2008 he made his first appearance for the England under-17 team against Portugal. He was part of the squad for the 2009 European Championship. He has played a total of ten times for the under-17s, scoring four goals.

== Personal life ==
Tunnicliffe attended Siddal Moor Sports College. On 14 October 2012, Tunnicliffe was charged for drink-driving by Greater Manchester Police, after his car collided with a van in Green Lane, Heywood.

== Career statistics ==
=== Club ===
As of match played 10 April 2025

Appearances and goals by club, season and competition
Club	Season	League			Cup		League Cup		Other		Total	
Club	Season	Division	Apps	Goals	Apps	Goals	Apps	Goals	Apps	Goals	Apps	Goals
Manchester United	2010–11	Premier League	0	0	0	0	0	0	0	0	0	0
Manchester United	2011–12	Premier League	0	0	0	0	0	0	0	0	0	0
Manchester United	2012–13	Premier League	0	0	0	0	2	0	–		2	0
Manchester United	2013–14	Premier League	0	0	0	0	0	0	0	0	0	0
Manchester United	Total		0	0	0	0	2	0	0	0	2	0
Peterborough United (loan)	2011–12	Championship	27	0	1	0	2	0	–		30	0
Barnsley (loan)	2012–13	Championship	2	0	1	0	–		–		3	0
Ipswich Town (loan)	2013–14	Championship	27	0	2	0	0	0	–		29	0
Fulham	2013–14	Premier League	3	0	–		0	0	–		3	0
Fulham	2014–15	Championship	22	0	2	0	0	0	0	0	24	0
Fulham	2015–16	Championship	27	2	0	0	2	0	0	0	29	2
Fulham	2016–17	Championship	7	0	0	0	3	0	0	0	10	0
Fulham	Total		59	2	2	0	5	0	0	0	66	2
Wigan Athletic (loan)	2013–14	Championship	5	0	–		–		0	0	5	0
Blackburn Rovers (loan)	2014–15	Championship	17	1	–		–		0	0	17	1
Wigan Athletic (loan)	2016–17	Championship	9	1	1	0	0	0	0	0	10	1
Millwall	2017–18	Championship	24	1	2	0	1	0	0	0	27	1
Millwall	2018–19	Championship	27	3	3	0	2	0	0	0	32	3
Millwall	Total		51	4	5	0	3	0	0	0	59	4
Luton Town	2019–20	Championship	40	1	0	0	0	0	0	0	40	1
Luton Town	2020–21	Championship	24	2	2	0	2	0	0	0	28	2
Luton Town	Total		64	3	2	0	2	0	0	0	68	3
Portsmouth	2021–22	League One	30	2	0	0	1	0	1 (Note: Appearance(s) in EFL Trophy)	0	32	2
Portsmouth	2022–23	League One	30	1	3	0	0	0	4	0	37	1
Portsmouth	Total		60	3	3	0	1	0	5	0	69	3
Adelaide United	2023–24	A-League Men	22	1	0	0	-		-		22	1
Adelaide United	2024–25	A-League Men	1	0	3	0	-		-		4	0
Career total			333	15	17	0	15	0	5	0	370	15

== Honours ==
Individual

- Jimmy Murphy Young Player of the Year: 2010–11
