= James Bree (footballer) =

English footballer (born 1997)

- James Bree in 2025

Personal information
- Full name: James Patrick Bree
- Date of birth: 11 December 1997 (age 28)
- Place of birth: Wakefield, England
- Height: 5 ft 10 in (1.78 m)
- Position: Right-back

Team information
- Current team: Southampton
- Number: 14

Youth career
- 2006–2009: Ossett Town
- 2009–2014: Barnsley

Senior career*
Years	Team	Apps	(Gls)
2014–2017	Barnsley	50	(0)
2017–2020	Aston Villa	21	(0)
2019	→ Ipswich Town (loan)	14	(0)
2019–2020	→ Luton Town (loan)	39	(0)
2020–2023	Luton Town	93	(2)
2023–	Southampton	74	(4)
2025–2026	→ Charlton Athletic (loan)	21	(2)
- * Club domestic league appearances and goals as of 17:42, 7 November 2026 (UTC)

James Patrick Bree (born 11 December 1997) is an English professional footballer who plays as a right-back for EFL Championship club Southampton.

He started his professional playing career for Barnsley before joining Aston Villa in 2017. Bree spent time on loan with Ipswich Town and Luton Town, before joining the latter club permanently in August 2019. He then signed for Southampton in January 2023. Bree spent half of the 2025–26 season on loan at Charlton Athletic.

== Career ==
=== Barnsley ===
Bree began his career with Barnsley and made his professional debut on 3 May 2014 in a 3–2 home defeat to Queens Park Rangers, becoming the club's second youngest debutant.

=== Aston Villa ===
Bree signed for Aston Villa on 25 January 2017 on a four-and-a-half-year contract for an undisclosed fee, described by Barnsley as "substantial". He made his debut for Aston Villa on 4 February in a 2–1 away defeat to Nottingham Forest.

He joined another Championship club, Ipswich Town, on 31 January 2019 on loan until the end of the season. His debut came three days later in a 1–0 defeat at home to Sheffield Wednesday.

=== Luton Town ===
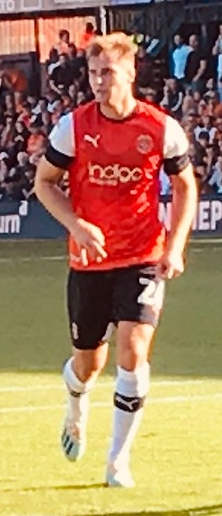
Bree with Luton Town in 2019

Following Aston Villa's promotion to the Premier League, Bree was loaned to Luton Town, who were newly promoted to the Championship, on 8 August 2019 on a season-long loan. He made his Luton debut as a 74th-minute substitute for Martin Cranie in a 2–1 away defeat to Cardiff City two days later. Bree contributed five assists as Luton avoided relegation to League One on the final day of the season.

Bree completed a permanent transfer to Luton on 1 September 2020. On 16 March 2021, he scored his first goal for the club in a 2–0 victory against Coventry City. His only other goal for the club came on 19 March 2022 in a 3–1 away victory against Hull City. Bree made 143 appearances for Luton in all competitions.

=== Southampton ===
==== 2023–2025 ====
On 26 January 2023, Bree signed a three-and-a-half-year contract with Southampton. He made his first appearance for Southampton on 31 January in a 2–1 defeat against Newcastle United in the EFL Cup semi-final second leg. Four days later, Bree made his Premier League debut in a 3–0 defeat to Brentford.

He was substituted with a suspected hamstring tweak on 23 December 2023 during a 1–0 away victory against Queens Park Rangers. Manager Russell Martin later confirmed that Bree was expected to be sidelined until the end of January. During a 3–2 defeat to Ipswich Town on 1 April 2024, he was shown a red card for a foul on Leif Davis.

On 28 August 2024, Bree scored his first goal for the club in a 5–3 away victory against Cardiff City in the EFL Cup. On 29 October, he scored the winner in a 3–2 victory against Stoke City in the EFL Cup.

==== 2025–present: Loan to Charlton Athletic and return to Southampton ====
On 1 September 2025, Bree joined Charlton Athletic on loan until January 2026, where he was re-united with Nathan Jones, his former manager at Luton Town and Southampton. He scored his first goal for the club on 27 September in a 3–0 victory against Blackburn Rovers. Bree returned to Southampton following his loan spell. Jones wanted to keep him and insisted Bree didn't want to return to Southampton.

Following his return from loan, Bree admitted a lack of communication between himself, Southampton and Charlton left him uncertain about his future. On 24 February 2026, he scored his first league goal for the club in a 5–0 victory against Queens Park Rangers.

On 12 June 2026, Bree signed a three-year contract extension. He scored the only goal in a 1–0 victory against Portsmouth in the South Coast derby on 11 October, which secured Southampton's first league victory against Portsmouth since November 2004. On 20 November, Bree was awarded the EFL Championship Goal of the Month for October after he scored a half-volley against West Ham United.

== Career statistics ==
As of match played 7 November 2026

Appearances and goals by club, season and competition
Club	Season	League			FA Cup		League Cup		Other		Total	
Club	Season	Division	Apps	Goals	Apps	Goals	Apps	Goals	Apps	Goals	Apps	Goals
Barnsley	2013–14	Championship	1	0	0	0	0	0	—		1	0
Barnsley	2014–15	League One	11	0	0	0	1	0	2 (Note: Appearances in Football League Trophy)	0	14	0
Barnsley	2015–16	League One	19	0	0	0	1	0	4	0	24	0
Barnsley	2016–17	Championship	19	0	2	0	1	0	—		22	0
Barnsley	Total		50	0	2	0	3	0	6	0	61	0
Aston Villa	2016–17	Championship	7	0	—		—		—		7	0
Aston Villa	2017–18	Championship	6	0	1	0	2	0	1 (Note: Appearance(s) in Championship play-offs)	0	10	0
Aston Villa	2018–19	Championship	8	0	1	0	2	0	—		11	0
Aston Villa	Total		21	0	2	0	4	0	1	0	28	0
Ipswich Town (loan)	2018–19	Championship	14	0	—		—		—		14	0
Luton Town (loan)	2019–20	Championship	39	0	1	0	2	0	—		42	0
Luton Town	2020–21	Championship	24	1	2	0	1	0	—		27	1
Luton Town	2021–22	Championship	42	1	1	0	0	0	2	0	45	1
Luton Town	2022–23	Championship	27	0	2	0	0	0	—		29	0
Luton Town	Total		132	2	6	0	3	0	2	0	143	2
Southampton	2022–23	Premier League	5	0	—		1	0	—		6	0
Southampton	2023–24	Championship	19	0	1	0	1	0	0	0	21	0
Southampton	2024–25	Premier League	17	0	2	0	4	2	—		23	2
Southampton	2025–26	Championship	18	2	4	1	0	0	2	0	24	3
Southampton	2026–27	Championship	15	2	0	0	2	0	—		17	2
Southampton	Total		74	4	7	1	8	2	2	0	91	7
Charlton Athletic (loan)	2025–26	Championship	21	2	1	0	—		—		22	2
Career total			312	8	18	1	18	2	11	0	359	11

== Honours ==
Barnsley

- Football League Trophy: 2015–16

Southampton

- EFL Championship play-offs: 2024
