= Simon Sluga =

Croatian professional footballer (born 1993)

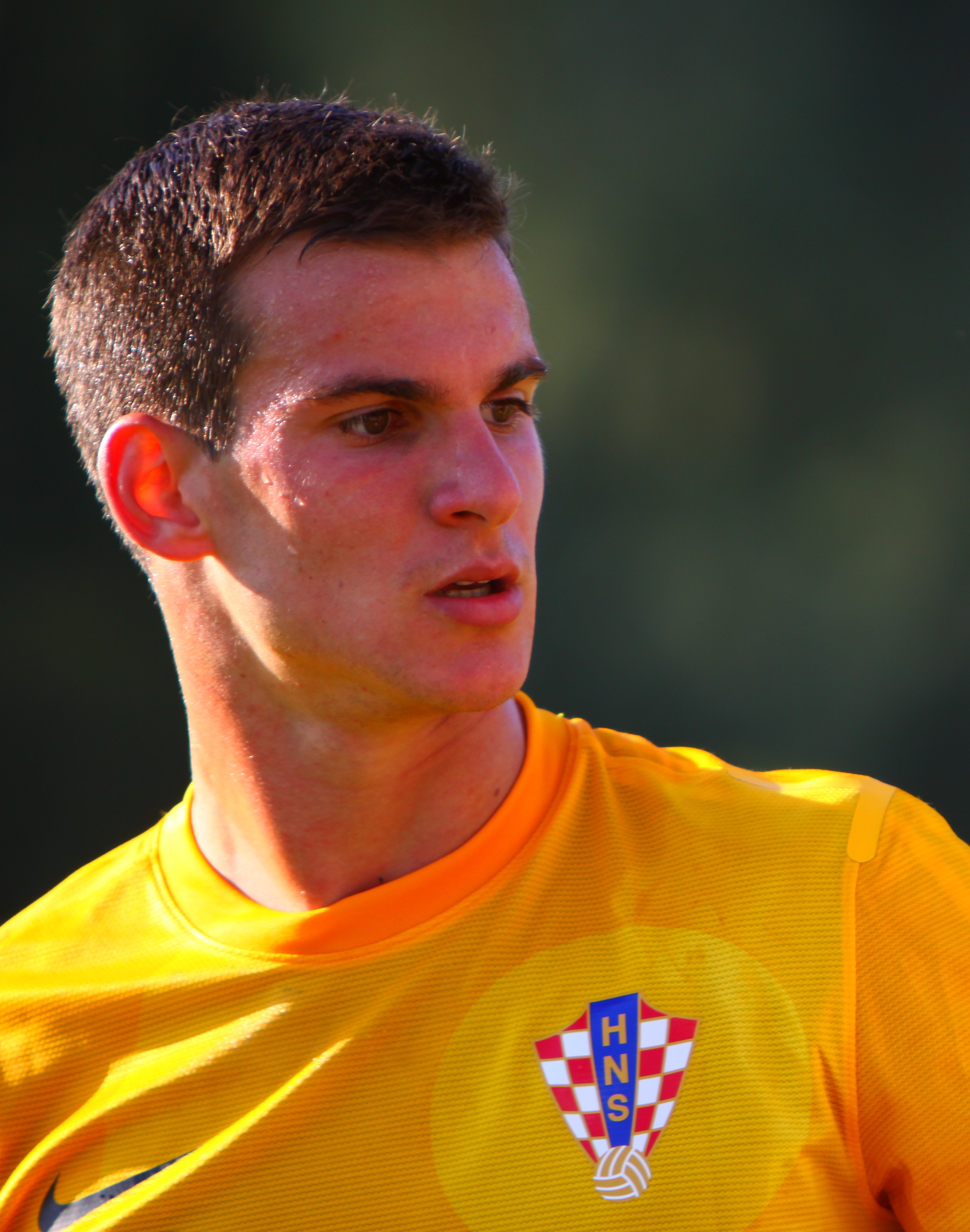
- Sluga playing for Croatia U19 at the 2012 UEFA European Under-19 Championship

Personal information
- Full name: Simon Sluga
- Date of birth: 17 March 1993 (age 33)
- Place of birth: Rijeka, Croatia
- Height: 1.90 m (6 ft 3 in)
- Position: Goalkeeper

Youth career
- 2003–2008: Jadran Poreč
- 2008–2013: Rijeka
- 2011–2012: → Juventus (loan)
- 2012–2013: → Hellas Verona (loan)

Senior career*
Years	Team	Apps	(Gls)
2013–2019	Rijeka	64	(0)
2013–2014	→ Pomorac (loan)	31	(0)
2014–2015	→ Lokomotiva (loan)	26	(0)
2015–2016	→ Spezia (loan)	0	(0)
2019–2022	Luton Town	91	(0)
2022–2024	Ludogorets Razgrad	20	(0)
2024–2025	Maccabi Tel Aviv	17	(0)
2025–	NK Celje	2	(0)

International career
2009–2010	Croatia U17	5	(0)
2011	Croatia U18	2	(0)
2011–2012	Croatia U19	9	(0)
2012–2013	Croatia U20	8	(0)
2012–2014	Croatia U21	3	(0)
2019–2020	Croatia	3	(0)
- * Club domestic league appearances and goals as of 30 March 2026

Simon Sluga (Croatian pronunciation: [sǐmon slǔːɡa]; born 17 March 1993) is a Croatian professional footballer who plays as a goalkeeper for Slovenian PrvaLiga club NK Celje.

== Club career ==
=== Rijeka ===
Before his professional career, Rijeka loaned Sluga to the youth academy of Juventus, and then to the youth academy of Hellas Verona. During the 2013–14 season he was loaned to Pomorac in Croatia's Druga HNL where he collected 31 caps and managed 17 clean sheets. He spent the 2014–15 season on loan with Lokomotiva where he was capped on 26 occasions. He returned to Rijeka following the end of the loan and made his professional debut on 19 July 2015 against Slaven Belupo. In August 2015, he was loaned to Spezia in Italy's Serie B.

=== Luton Town ===
On 19 July 2019, Sluga joined newly promoted Championship side Luton Town for a club record fee of €1.5 million, signing a three-year contract. On 2 August 2019, Sluga made his first appearance for Luton in a 3–3 draw against Middlesbrough. Sluga left Luton in 2022 having played 94 times in all competitions and keeping 26 clean sheets.

=== Ludogrets Razgrad ===
On 31 January 2022, Sluga joined First Professional Football League club Ludogorets Razgrad.

=== Maccabi Tel Aviv ===
On 17 October 2024, Sluga joined Israeli Premier League club Maccabi Tel Aviv on a contract until the end of the 2024–25 season.

== International career ==
He made his debut for Croatia on 11 June 2019 in a friendly against Tunisia, as a starter.

== Career statistics ==
=== Club ===
As of 18 October 2024

Appearances and goals by club, season and competition
Club	Season	League			National cup (Note: Includes Croatian Cup, FA Cup, Bulgarian Cup, Israel State Cup)		League cup		Other		Total	
Club	Season	Division	Apps	Goals	Apps	Goals	Apps	Goals	Apps	Goals	Apps	Goals
Rijeka	2014–15	Prva HNL	0	0	—		—		0	0	0	0
Rijeka	2015–16	Prva HNL	2	0	—		—		1 (Note: Appearance(s) in UEFA Europa League)	0	3	0
Rijeka	2016–17	Prva HNL	0	0	2	0	—		0	0	2	0
Rijeka	2017–18	Prva HNL	27	0	3	0	—		9 (Note: Six appearances in UEFA Champions League, three appearances in UEFA Europa League)	0	39	0
Rijeka	2018–19	Prva HNL	35	0	4	0	—		2	0	41	0
Rijeka	2019–20	Prva HNL	—		—		—		1 (Note: Appearance in Croatian Super Cup)	0	1	0
Rijeka	Total		64	0	9	0	—		13	0	86	0
Pomorac (loan)	2013–14	Druga HNL	31	0	0	0	—		—		31	0
Lokomotiva (loan)	2014–15	Prva HNL	26	0	2	0	—		—		28	0
Spezia (loan)	2015–16	Serie B	0	0	0	0	—		—		0	0
Luton Town	2019–20	Championship	33	0	1	0	0	0	—		34	0
Luton Town	2020–21	Championship	39	0	2	0	0	0	—		41	0
Luton Town	2021–22	Championship	19	0	0	0	0	0	—		19	0
Luton Town	Total		91	0	3	0	0	0	—		94	0
Ludogorets Razgrad	2021–22	First Professional Football League	2	0	3	0	—		0	0	5	0
Ludogorets Razgrad	2022–23	First Professional Football League	3	0	6	0	—		4 (Note: Two appearances in UEFA Champions League, two appearances in UEFA Europa League)	0	13	0
Ludogorets Razgrad	2023–24	First Professional Football League	15	0	2	0	—		5 (Note: Two appearances in UEFA Europe League, three appearances in UEFA Europa Conference League)	0	22	0
Ludogorets Razgrad	Total		20	0	11	0	0	0	9	0	40	0
Maccabi Tel Aviv	2024–25	Israeli Premier League	16	0	2	0	—		—		18	0
Career total			248	0	27	0	0	0	22	0	297	0

=== International ===
As of match played 11 November 2020

Appearances and goals by national team and year
National team	Year	Apps	Goals
Croatia	2019	2	0
Croatia	2020	1	0
Total		3	0

== Honours ==
HNK Rijeka

- Croatian Football Cup: 2018–19

Celje

- Slovenian PrvaLiga: 2025–26

Individual

- Luton Town Player of the Season: 2020–21
