= Dan Potts (footballer) =

English footballer (born 1994)

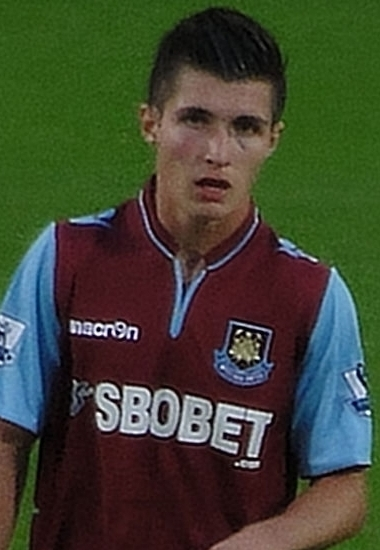
- Potts playing for West Ham United in 2012

Personal information
- Full name: Daniel Potts
- Date of birth: 13 April 1994 (age 32)
- Place of birth: Barking, England
- Height: 5 ft 8 in (1.72 m)
- Positions: Left-back; centre-back

Youth career
- 2003–2011: West Ham United

Senior career*
Years	Team	Apps	(Gls)
2011–2015	West Ham United	5	(0)
2012–2013	→ Colchester United (loan)	5	(0)
2013	→ Portsmouth (loan)	5	(0)
2015–2024	Luton Town	195	(10)
2024–2025	Charlton Athletic	1	(0)

International career
2011	United States U20	1	(0)
2012	England U18	1	(0)
2012–2013	England U19	2	(0)
2013	England U20	3	(0)
- * Club domestic league appearances and goals as of 17:10, 28 January 2025 (UTC)

Daniel Potts (born 13 April 1994) is an English professional footballer who plays as a left-back or centre-back. He is currently a free agent.

He was capped by the United States under-20 team and the England under-18, under-19 and under-20 teams. He has played for West Ham United, Luton Town and Charlton Athletic and had loan spells with Colchester United and Portsmouth.

== Club career ==
=== West Ham United ===
Born in Barking, Greater London, Potts joined West Ham United aged nine and signed as a scholar in May 2010. He made his reserve team debut away to Wolverhampton Wanderers on 27 April 2011, and his senior debut on 17 December in a 1–0 victory at home to Barnsley, just one day after signing a two-and-a-half-year professional contract with the club. He received the Young Hammer of the Year award in May 2012 after making four appearances in 2011–12, in which West Ham were promoted back to the Premier League after a 2–1 win over Blackpool in the 2012 Championship play-off final at Wembley Stadium.

Potts joined League One club Colchester United on 22 November 2012 on a one-month loan. He made his debut a day later in a 5–1 defeat away to Milton Keynes Dons. The loan was extended on 21 December for a further month. Potts was recalled from his loan by West Ham on 3 January 2013 and started in their 2–2 draw with Manchester United in the FA Cup third round two days later. He made his full Premier League debut in a 3–0 defeat away to Sunderland on 12 January, in which he made an error that led to the second goal. Potts came on as a 62nd-minute substitute for Jack Collison in a 5–1 defeat away to Arsenal on 23 January but suffered concussion after a clash of heads with Bacary Sagna. He was released from hospital the next day and played no further part in 2012–13.

He signed for League Two club Portsmouth on a one-month loan on 20 November 2013. Potts debuted three days later in a 2–1 defeat to Scunthorpe United at Fratton Park. He returned to West Ham in December, having made five appearances for Portsmouth.

Potts made his first and only appearance of 2014–15 in the League Cup second round at home to Sheffield United on 26 August 2014, which West Ham lost 5–4 in a penalty shoot-out after a 1–1 draw after extra time. He was released by West Ham at the end of the season after 12 years at the club.

=== Luton Town ===
Following his release by West Ham, Potts signed for League Two club Luton Town on a two-year contract. He made his debut in a 3–1 win at home to newly promoted Championship club Bristol City in the League Cup first round on 11 August 2015. Potts suffered a hamstring injury at the end of August, making his return in a 2–1 defeat away to League One team Gillingham in the Football League Trophy second round on 6 October. He replaced Scott Griffiths in the team after Griffiths' wife gave birth to their son, making four league appearances in October. However, in the last of these matches, a 2–1 defeat at home to Plymouth Argyle, Potts picked up an injury and was substituted after 28 minutes. His next appearance did not come until 5 March 2016 when he started in a 1–0 win away to Leyton Orient in place of the injured Jake Howells. Potts then started the next two matches, but sustained an ankle injury during the latter match, a 1–0 win away to Plymouth Argyle. He made his return from injury on 9 April, starting in Luton's 2–0 defeat at home to Accrington Stanley. Potts retained his place in the team for the remainder of 2015–16 and finished the season with 16 appearances. In the final of the 2022–23 EFL Championship playoffs, Potts scored the winning penalty goal against Coventry. This put Luton in the 2023–24 Premier League. On 24 May 2024, Luton announced he would be leaving after nine years at the club.

=== Charlton Athletic ===
On 6 September 2024, Potts signed a short-term contract with Charlton Athletic until early January 2025, having featured for the Addicks during pre-season.

On 28 January 2025, it was confirmed that Potts had departed the club following the expiration of his contract.

== International career ==
As his father was born in the United States, Potts was presumed eligible to play for both the England national football team and the United States men's national soccer team. Potts was invited and took part in a United States under-20 camp in 2011. He made his debut for the United States under-20 team as a substitute, playing 21 minutes in a 2–1 defeat to France in a friendly in Vichy. However, in April 2012, U.S. Soccer officials determined that Potts was not eligible for U.S. citizenship, as his father did not meet residency requirements to pass along citizenship to his son, meaning he could no longer play for the United States at any level.

Potts played the first half for the England under-18 team in a 3–0 win over Poland at Crewe's Alexandra Stadium on 7 March 2012. Later that year, he progressed to the England under-19 team, playing the full 90 minutes in a 1–0 win over Finland in a friendly on 13 November. On 21 March 2013, Potts played another full 90 minutes in a 1–0 win over Turkey.

On 28 May 2013, he was named in manager Peter Taylor's 21-man squad for the 2013 FIFA U-20 World Cup. Potts made his England under-20 team debut in a warm-up match on 16 June as a 45th-minute substitute in a 3–0 win over Uruguay. He played the full 90 minutes of England's first Group E match, a 2–2 draw with Iraq on 23 June. Three days later, Potts conceded a penalty as England drew 1–1 with Chile. After receiving a yellow card in the first two group matches, Potts was suspended for the final group match against Egypt, which England lost 2–0, and were eliminated from the competition after failing to win a match.

== Personal life ==
Potts is the son of former West Ham United captain Steve Potts and attended Marshalls Park School in Romford. His brother, Freddie, made his first-team debut for West Ham in December 2021.

At the age of 12, Potts was diagnosed with leukaemia. However, just before his 16th birthday he was given the all clear.

== Career statistics ==
As of match played 10 December 2024

Appearances and goals by club, season and competition
Club	Season	League			FA Cup		League Cup		Other		Total	
Club	Season	Division	Apps	Goals	Apps	Goals	Apps	Goals	Apps	Goals	Apps	Goals
West Ham United	2011–12	Championship	3	0	1	0	0	0	0	0	4	0
West Ham United	2012–13	Premier League	2	0	2	0	2	0	—		6	0
West Ham United	2013–14	Premier League	0	0	1	0	1	0	—		2	0
West Ham United	2014–15	Premier League	0	0	0	0	1	0	—		1	0
West Ham United	Total		5	0	4	0	4	0	0	0	13	0
Colchester United (loan)	2012–13	League One	5	0	—		—		—		5	0
Portsmouth (loan)	2013–14	League Two	5	0	—		—		—		5	0
Luton Town	2015–16	League Two	14	0	0	0	1	0	1 (Note: Appearance in Football League Trophy)	0	16	0
Luton Town	2016–17	League Two	23	0	1	0	1	0	3 (Note: One appearance in EFL Trophy, two appearances and one goal in League Two play-offs)	1	28	1
Luton Town	2017–18	League Two	42	6	3	1	0	0	0	0	45	7
Luton Town	2018–19	League One	24	1	2	0	0	0	1 (Note: Appearance in EFL Trophy)	0	27	1
Luton Town	2019–20	Championship	33	1	0	0	1	0	—		34	1
Luton Town	2020–21	Championship	24	1	2	0	0	0	—		26	1
Luton Town	2021–22	Championship	10	0	2	0	0	0	0	0	12	0
Luton Town	2022–23	Championship	25	1	2	0	0	0	1 (Note: Appearance in EFL Championship play-offs)	0	28	1
Luton Town	2023–24	Premier League	0	0	0	0	0	0	—		0	0
Luton Town	Total		195	10	12	1	3	0	6	1	216	12
Charlton Athletic	2024–25	League One	1	0	0	0	—		2 (Note: Appearances in EFL Trophy)	0	3	0
Career total			211	10	16	1	7	0	8	1	242	12

== Honours ==
Luton Town

- EFL Championship play-offs: 2023
- EFL League One: 2018–19
- EFL League Two second-place promotion: 2017–18

Individual

- Young Hammer of the Year: 2011–12
- PFA Team of the Year: 2017–18 League Two
