= 2019–20 Luton Town F.C. season =

English football club season

Luton Town F.C.
2019–20 season
- Owner: Luton Town Football Club 2020 Limited
- Chairman: David Wilkinson
- Manager: Graeme Jones (until 24 April 2020); Mick Harford (interim, from 24 April 2020 to 28 May 2020); Nathan Jones (from 28 May 2020)
- Stadium: Kenilworth Road
- Championship: 19th
- FA Cup: Third round (eliminated by AFC Bournemouth)
- EFL Cup: Third round (eliminated by Leicester City)
- Top goalscorer: League: James Collins (14); All: James Collins (14)
- Highest home attendance: 10,070 vs Stoke City, Championship, 29 February 2020
- Lowest home attendance: 5,435 vs Ipswich Town, EFL Cup, 13 August 2019
- Average home league attendance: 10,047
Home colours	Away colours	Third colours

The 2019–20 season was the 134th in the history of Luton Town Football Club, a professional association football club based in Luton, Bedfordshire, England. Their successive promotions from League Two in 2017–18 and League One in 2018–19 meant it was the club's first season in the Championship after a 12-year absence and 94th season in the English Football League. The season ran from 1 July 2019 to the end of the 2019–20 Championship season.

== Background and pre-season ==
Pre-season match details
Date	Opponents	Venue	Result	Score F–A	Scorers	Attendance	Ref.
6 July 2019	Welwyn Garden City	A	W	3–1	Collins (2) 16', 27', Hylton 83'	825	
13 July 2019	Bedford Town	A	W	2–1	Moncur 49', Jervis 85'	1,604	
16 July 2019	Basingstoke Town	N	W	7–2	Collins 23' pen., Shinnie 43', Lee 53', McManaman 55', Neufville 83', Cornick 92', Jervis 94'		
24 July 2019	C.S. Marítimo	N	W	2–0	Cornick 67', Collins 84' pen.		
27 July 2019	Norwich City	H	L	1–5	Potts 34'	4,218	

== Competitions ==
=== EFL Championship ===
EFL Championship match details
Date	League position	Opponents	Venue	Result	Score F–A	Scorers	Attendance	Ref.
2 August 2019	1st	Middlesbrough	H	D	3–3	Bradley 17', Cranie 24', Collins 85'	10,053	
10 August 2019	17th	Cardiff City	A	L	1–2	Pearson 86'	24,724	
17 August 2019	20th	West Bromwich Albion	H	L	1–2	Cornick 15'	10,059	
20 August 2019	23rd	Sheffield Wednesday	A	L	0–1		23,353	
24 August 2019	18th	Barnsley	A	W	3–1	Butterfield 2', Collins 5', Cornick 31'	13,250	
31 August 2019	15th	Huddersfield Town	H	W	2–1	Collins 57' pen., Shinnie 66'	10,062	
14 September 2019	16th	Queens Park Rangers	A	L	2–3	Cornick 36', Collins 48'	16,186	
21 September 2019	21st	Hull City	H	L	0–3		10,066	
28 September 2019	16th	Blackburn Rovers	A	W	2–1	Collins 17', Pearson 57'	15,319	
2 October 2019	17th	Millwall	H	D	1–1	McManaman 86'	10,049	
5 October 2019	18th	Derby County	A	L	0–2		27,944	
19 October 2019	16th	Bristol City	H	W	3–0	Mpanzu 56', Cornick 62', Williams 90+5' o.g.	10,064	
23 October 2019	18th	Fulham	A	L	2–3	Potts 60', LuaLua 90+3'	18,082	
26 October 2019	18th	Birmingham City	A	L	1–2	Cornick 67'	21,799	
2 November 2019	21st	Nottingham Forest	H	L	1–2	McManaman 87'	10,053	
9 November 2019	21st	Reading	A	L	0–3		15,251	
23 November 2019	21st	Leeds United	H	L	1–2	Collins 54'	10,068	
26 November 2019	20th	Charlton Athletic	H	W	2–1	Mpanzu 19', Brown 53'	10,004	
30 November 2019	21st	Brentford	A	L	0–7		11,287	
7 December 2019	20th	Wigan Athletic	H	W	2–1	McManaman 87', Moncur 90+3'	10,011	
10 December 2019	21st	Stoke City	A	L	0–3		20,216	
14 December 2019	21st	Preston North End	A	L	1–2	Collins 43' pen.	12,083	
21 December 2019	21st	Swansea City	H	L	0–1		10,062	
26 December 2019	22nd	Fulham	H	D	3–3	LuaLua 5', Collins 28', Cornick 84'	10,068	
29 December 2019	23rd	Bristol City	A	L	0–3		22,216	
1 January 2020	24th	Millwall	A	L	1–3	Bradley 41'	12,134	
11 January 2020	24th	Birmingham City	H	L	1–2	Collins 62' pen.	10,062	
19 January 2020	24th	Nottingham Forest	A	L	1–3	Cornick 23'	27,081	
28 January 2020	24th	Derby County	H	W	3–2	Mpanzu 67', Daniels 73', Bogle 86' o.g.	10,057	
1 February 2020	24th	West Bromwich Albion	A	L	0–2		25,141	
8 February 2020	24th	Cardiff City	H	L	0–1		10,041	
12 February 2020	23rd	Sheffield Wednesday	H	W	1–0	Collins 23'	10,001	
15 February 2020	23rd	Middlesbrough	A	W	1–0	Tunnicliffe 17'	19,734	
22 February 2020	24th	Charlton Athletic	A	L	1–3	Cornick 36'	18,969	
25 February 2020	23rd	Brentford	H	W	2–1	Baptiste 9' o.g., Cranie 45+2'	10,008	
29 February 2020	24th	Stoke City	H	D	1–1	Collins 90+1' pen.	10,070	
7 March 2020	23rd	Wigan Athletic	A	D	0–0		10,292	
20 June 2020	24th	Preston North End	H	D	1–1	McManaman 87'	0	
27 June 2020	23rd	Swansea City	A	W	1–0	Collins 72'	0	
30 June 2020	24th	Leeds United	A	D	1–1	Cornick 50'	0	
4 July 2020	24th	Reading	H	L	0–5		0	
7 July 2020	24th	Barnsley	H	D	1–1	Berry 13'	0	
10 July 2020	23rd	Huddersfield Town	A	W	2–0	Bradley 49', Lee 71'	0	
14 July 2020	23rd	Queens Park Rangers	H	D	1–1	Collins 20' pen.	0	
18 July 2020	22nd	Hull City	A	W	1–0	LuaLua 85'	0	
22 July 2020	19th	Blackburn Rovers	H	W	3–2	Carter 28' o.g., Johnson 35' o.g., Collins 60' pen.	0	

=== League table ===
Pos	Team	Pld	W	D	L	GF	GA	GD	Pts	Promotion, qualification or relegation
16	Sheffield Wednesday	46	15	11	20	58	66	−8	56	
17	Middlesbrough	46	13	14	19	48	61	−13	53	
18	Huddersfield Town	46	13	12	21	52	70	−18	51	
19	Luton Town	46	14	9	23	54	82	−28	51	
20	Birmingham City	46	12	14	20	54	75	−21	50	
21	Barnsley	46	12	13	21	49	69	−20	49	
22	Charlton Athletic (R)	46	12	12	22	50	65	−15	48	Relegation to EFL League One

Source: EFL Official Website
Rules for classification: 1) Points; 2) Goal difference; 3) Number of goals scored; 4) Head-to-head results; 5) Wins; 6) Away goals; 7) Penalty points (sec 9.5); 8) 12-point sending off offences
(R) Relegated

=== FA Cup ===
FA Cup match details
Round	Date	Opponents	Venue	Result	Score F–A	Scorers	Attendance	Ref.
Third round	4 January 2020	AFC Bournemouth	A	L	0–4		10,064	

=== EFL Cup ===
EFL Cup match details
Round	Date	Opponents	Venue	Result	Score F–A	Scorers	Attendance	Ref.
First round	13 August 2019	Ipswich Town	H	W	3–1	Jones 8', Lee 17' pen., Shinnie 55'	5,435	
Second round	27 August 2019	Cardiff City	A	W	3–0	Hoilett 43' o.g., Sheehan 63', Jervis 70'	4,111	
Third round	24 September 2019	Leicester City	H	L	0–4		8,260	

== Transfers ==
=== In ===
Date	Player	Club†	Fee	Ref.
1 July 2019	Martin Cranie	(Sheffield United)	Free	
1 July 2019	Callum McManaman	(Wigan Athletic)	Free	
1 July 2019	Ryan Tunnicliffe	(Millwall)	Free	
3 July 2019	Brendan Galloway	Everton	Free	
19 July 2019	Simon Sluga	HNK Rijeka	Undisclosed	
22 July 2019	Kazenga LuaLua	(Luton Town)	Free	
30 July 2019	Jacob Butterfield	(Derby County)	Free	
2 September 2019	Donervon Daniels	(Blackpool)	Free	
22 January 2020	Peter Kioso	Hartlepool United	Undisclosed	
30 January 2020	Eunan O'Kane	Leeds United	Undisclosed	

† Brackets around club names indicate the player's contract with that club had expired before he joined Luton.

=== Out ===
Date	Player	Club†	Fee	Ref.
1 July 2019	Luke Gambin	(Colchester United)	Released	
1 July 2019	Jack James		Released	
1 July 2019	Aaron Jarvis	(Sutton United)	Released	
1 July 2019	Kazenga LuaLua	(Luton Town)	Released	
1 July 2019	Alan McCormack	(Northampton Town)	Released	
1 July 2019	Arthur Read	(Brentford)	Compensation	
1 July 2019	Jack Senior		Released	
8 July 2019	Jack Stacey	AFC Bournemouth	Undisclosed	
31 January 2020	Alan Sheehan	(Lincoln City)	Released	
30 June 2020	Donervon Daniels	(Crewe Alexandra)	Released	
30 June 2020	Jake Jervis	(SJK Seinäjoki)	Released	
30 June 2020	Lloyd Jones		Released	
30 June 2020	Frankie Musonda	(Raith Rovers)	Released	
30 June 2020	Marek Štěch	(Mansfield Town)	Released	
22 July 2020	Jacob Butterfield	(Melbourne Victory)	Released	
22 July 2020	Callum McManaman		Released	

† Brackets around club names indicate the player joined that club after his Luton contract expired.

=== Loan in ===
Date	Player	Club	Return	Ref.
8 August 2019	Luke Bolton	Manchester City	End of season	
8 August 2019	James Bree	Aston Villa	End of season	
8 August 2019	Izzy Brown	Chelsea	End of season	
30 January 2020	Cameron Carter-Vickers	Tottenham Hotspur	End of season	

=== Loan out ===
Date	Player	Club	Return	Ref.
2 September 2019	Donervon Daniels	Doncaster Rovers	January 2020	
2 September 2019	Jake Jervis	Salford City	End of season	
3 September 2019	Harry Isted	Oxford City	30 September 2019	
13 September 2019	Josh Neufville	Solihull Moors	4 January 2020	
18 October 2019	Frankie Musonda	St Albans City	January 2020	
25 October 2019	Corey Panter	Hendon	One month	
25 October 2019	Glen Rea	Woking	One month	
29 November 2019	Corey Panter	Biggleswade Town	January 2020	
30 November 2019	Harry Isted	Wealdstone	January 2020	
14 January 2020	Corey Panter	Biggleswade Town	One month	
17 January 2020	Josh Neufville	Woking	One month	
31 January 2020	Lloyd Jones	Northampton Town	End of season	
6 February 2020	Sam Beckwith	Biggleswade Town	April 2020	
6 March 2020	Frankie Musonda	St Albans City	End of season	
10 March 2020	Jake Peck	Biggleswade Town	April 2020	

== Appearances and goals ==
Numbers in parentheses denote appearances as substitute.
Players with names struck through and marked † left the club during the playing season.
Players with names in italics and marked * were on loan from another club for the whole of their season with Luton.
Players listed with no appearances have been in the matchday squad but only as unused substitutes.
Key to positions: GK – Goalkeeper; DF – Defender; MF – Midfielder; FW – Forward

Players included in matchday squads
No.	Pos.	Nat.	Name	League		FA Cup		EFL Cup		Total		Discipline	
No.	Pos.	Nat.	Name	Apps	Goals	Apps	Goals	Apps	Goals	Apps	Goals	A yellow rectangle, denoting the yellow penalty card shown to a player being cautioned	A red rectangle, denoting the red penalty card shown to a player being sent off
1	GK	CZE	Marek Štěch	0	0	0	0	0	0	0	0	0	0
2	DF	ENG	Martin Cranie	19 (5)	2	0	0	0 (1)	0	19 (6)	2	3	0
3	DF	ENG	Dan Potts	31 (2)	1	0	0	1	0	32 (2)	1	10	0
4	MF	ENG	Ryan Tunnicliffe	37 (3)	1	0	0	0	0	37 (3)	1	3	0
5	DF	ENG	Sonny Bradley	39 (1)	3	0	0	0	0	39 (1)	3	2	0
6	DF	ENG	Matty Pearson	41 (1)	2	1	0	0	0	42 (1)	2	3	0
7	MF	ENG	Callum McManaman	10 (13)	4	0	0	1 (2)	0	11 (15)	4	1	0
8	MF	ENG	Luke Berry	15 (6)	1	0 (1)	0	3	0	18 (7)	1	5	0
9	FW	ENG	Danny Hylton	2 (9)	0	0	0	0	0	2 (9)	0	1	0
10	FW	ENG	Elliot Lee	8 (3)	1	1	0	3	1	12 (3)	2	1	0
11	MF	SCO	Andrew Shinnie	16 (5)	1	1	0	1	1	18 (5)	2	4	0
12	GK	CRO	Simon Sluga	33	0	1	0	0	0	34	0	1	0
14	FW	ENG	Harry Cornick	37 (8)	9	1	0	1 (1)	0	39 (9)	9	2	0
15	FW	ENG	Jake Jervis	0	0	0	0	1	1	1	1	0	0
16	MF	IRL	Glen Rea	13 (2)	0	1	0	0	0	14 (2)	0	9	0
17	MF	ENG	Pelly Ruddock Mpanzu	40 (4)	3	0	0	2	0	42 (4)	3	6	0
18	DF	USA	Cameron Carter-Vickers *	15 (1)	0	0	0	0	0	15 (1)	0	2	0
19	FW	IRL	James Collins	44 (2)	14	0	0	0	0	44 (2)	14	9	0
20	MF	ENG	George Moncur	1 (16)	1	1	0	2	0	4 (16)	1	1	0
22	MF	ENG	Luke Bolton *	10 (14)	0	0 (1)	0	2 (1)	0	12 (16)	0	1	0
23	DF	ENG	Brendan Galloway	0 (3)	0	0	0	2	0	2 (3)	0	0	0
24	FW	ENG	Izzy Brown *	17 (8)	1	0	0	2 (1)	0	19 (9)	1	5	0
25	MF	DRC	Kazenga LuaLua	15 (14)	3	0	0	1 (1)	0	16 (15)	3	3	0
26	DF	ENG	James Bree *	34 (5)	0	0 (1)	0	2	0	36 (6)	0	2	0
28	DF	ENG	Lloyd Jones	1 (3)	0	1	0	3	1	5 (3)	1	1	0
29	MF	ENG	Jacob Butterfield	11 (4)	1	1	0	1	0	13 (4)	1	2	0
30	DF	DRC	Peter Kioso	0 (1)	0	0	0	0	0	0 (1)	0	0	0
33	DF	MSR	Donervon Daniels	2 (1)	1	1	0	0	0	3 (1)	1	0	0
34	DF	ENG	Corey Panter	0	0	0	0	0	0	0	0	0	0
35	FW	ENG	Josh Neufville	0	0	0	0	0 (1)	0	0 (1)	0	0	0
36	GK	ENG	James Shea	13	0	0	0	3	0	16	0	0	0
44	DF	IRL	~~Alan Sheehan~~ †	2 (2)	0	1	0	2	1	5 (2)	1	0	0

Players not included in matchday squads
No.	Pos.	Nat.	Name
32	MF	IRL	Eunan O'Kane
37	DF	ENG	Frankie Musonda
40	GK	ENG	Harry Isted
41	MF	ENG	Jake Peck
42	GK	NIR	Tiernan Parker
