= Jake Peck =

English footballer (born 2000)

Personal information
- Full name: Jake David Peck
- Date of birth: 9 January 2000 (age 26)
- Place of birth: Luton, England
- Position: Midfielder

Team information
- Current team: Concord Rangers (on loan from Luton Town)

Youth career
- –2018: Luton Town

Senior career*
Years	Team	Apps	(Gls)
2018–2022	Luton Town	0	(0)
2020	→ Biggleswade Town (loan)	0	(0)
2021–	→ Concord Rangers (loan)	9	(1)
- * Club domestic league appearances and goals as of 20:19, 13 November 2021 (UTC)

Jake David Peck (born 9 January 2000) is an English professional footballer who plays as a midfielder for Concord Rangers on loan from Luton Town.

== Career ==
Born in Luton, Bedfordshire, Peck signed scholarship terms with Luton Town in the summer of 2017. He made his professional debut as an 87th-minute substitute for Jorge Grant in a 3–0 home win over Milton Keynes Dons in an EFL Trophy group stage match on 9 October 2018.

On 10 March 2020, Peck joined Biggleswade Town on a one-month loan. However, he didn't feature for the club after the coronavirus pandemic halted all levels of football. On 13 August 2021, he joined National League South side Concord Rangers on a season-long loan.

== Career statistics ==
As of end of 2018–19 season

Appearances and goals by club, season and competition
Club	Season	League			FA Cup		EFL Cup		Other		Total	
Club	Season	Division	Apps	Goals	Apps	Goals	Apps	Goals	Apps	Goals	Apps	Goals
Luton Town	2018–19	League One	0	0	0	0	0	0	1 (Note: Appearance in EFL Trophy)	0	1	0
Career total			0	0	0	0	0	0	1	0	1	0
