= 2023 EFL Championship play-off final =

Association football match in London

- Wembley Stadium in London hosted the final.
Coventry City	Luton Town
1	1
- After extra time Luton Town won 6–5 on penalties
- Date: 27 May 2023
- Venue: Wembley Stadium
- Man of the Match: Elijah Adebayo (Luton Town)
- Referee: Michael Oliver
- Attendance: 85,711

The 2023 EFL Championship play-off final was an association football match which was played on 27 May 2023 at Wembley Stadium in London, England, between Luton Town and Coventry City.

The match was to determine the third and final team to gain promotion from the EFL Championship, the second tier of English football, to the Premier League. Luton Town and Coventry City had finished third and fifth respectively in the league season. The top two teams of the 2022–23 EFL Championship, Burnley and Sheffield United, gained automatic promotion to the Premier League, while the clubs placed from third to sixth in the table took part in 2023 English Football League play-offs. The match was notable for the rapid ascent of both sides through the English league system, as both teams had played in League Two in the 2017–18 season.

With the score 1–1 after extra time with goals from Jordan Clark and Gustavo Hamer, Luton won the final on penalties to secure a return to the top flight after 31 seasons, and for the first time in the Premier League era, having been relegated the season prior to its formation. Success in the final was estimated by the accountancy company Deloitte to be worth £170 million to the winning team over the next three seasons.

== Route to the final ==
EFL Championship final table, leading positions
Pos	Team	Pld	W	D	L	GF	GA	GD	Pts
1	Burnley (C, P)	46	29	14	3	87	35	+52	101
2	Sheffield United (P)	46	28	7	11	73	39	+34	91
3	Luton Town (O, P)	46	21	17	8	57	39	+18	80
4	Middlesbrough	46	22	9	15	84	56	+28	75
5	Coventry City	46	18	16	12	58	46	+12	70
6	Sunderland	46	18	15	13	68	55	+13	69

Source: English Football League
(C) Champions; (O) Play-off winners; (P) Promoted

Luton Town finished the regular 2022–23 season in third place in the EFL Championship, the second tier of the English football league system, two places and 10 points ahead of Coventry City. They both therefore missed out on the two automatic places for promotion to the Premier League and instead took part in the play-offs to determine the third and final promoted team. Luton finished 11 points behind Sheffield United (who were promoted in second place) and 21 points behind league winners Burnley.

In their play-off semi-final, Luton faced sixth-placed Sunderland with the first match of the two-legged tie taking place at the Stadium of Light in Sunderland on 13 May 2023. Luton took the lead in the 11th minute after Sunderland had failed to clear a corner and Elijah Adebayo scored from a rebounded shot after Alfie Doughty's close range strike was saved by Anthony Patterson. Sunderland dominated the possession as the half progressed and they equalized in the 39th minute when Amad Diallo curled the ball into the top corner of the net following an Alex Pritchard free kick. Sunderland maintained their momentum in the second half and in the 63rd minute, Trai Hume scored with a header from a Jack Clarke cross. Luton rallied towards the end of the second-half but were unable to score an equalizer and the game finished 2–1. The second leg took place at Luton's Kenilworth Road on 16 May with both clubs fielding the same starting elevens. Luton scored in the 10th minute when Tom Lockyer won the ball from a corner and the ball fell to Gabriel Osho who reacted quickly to score. Luton added a second in the 43rd minute when an inswinging cross by Alfie Doughty was met by Lockyer to head home and make the score 2–0. Luton's tactic of putting high balls into the Sunderland penalty box continued to cause the Sunderland defence problems while Sunderland rarely troubled the Luton defence. No further goals were scored and Luton won 3–2 on aggregate winning a place in the final and a chance to return to the top tier of English football for the first time since 1992.

In the other play-off semi-final, on 14 May, Coventry City played Middlesbrough in the first leg at the Coventry Building Society Arena in Coventry. In a match described by BBC Sport's Ged Scott as "tense but poor", Coventry failed to have a single shot on target. Middlesbrough managed only two shots on target but also failed to score as the match ended 0–0. The second leg was played at the Riverside Stadium on 17 May. The only goal of the game came in the 57th minute when Middlesbrough lost possession on the half-way line. Coventry's Viktor Gyökeres played the ball into space past Middlesbrough goalkeeper, Zack Steffen. Gustavo Hamer took control of the ball and hit a precise shot into the roof of the net. Middlesbrough pressed for an equalizer and they had the ball in the net with two minutes to go only for it to be ruled out for offside. Eight minutes of added time were played but Middlesbrough could not find a way past the Coventry defence and the game ended 1–0 to Coventry and also 1–0 on aggregate, sending Coventry through to the final.

== Match ==
=== Background ===
This was Coventry City's second play-off final, the first being a 3–1 win against Exeter City in the 2018 League Two play-off final. They had last played in the Premier League in the 2000–01 season, when they were relegated to the Championship (then known as Football League Division One). Aside from the 2018 match, the club's prior visits to Wembley Stadium included the 1987 FA Cup final against Tottenham Hotspur, which Coventry won 3–2 after extra time, a defeat in their Charity Shield game against Everton the same year, and the 2017 EFL Trophy final in which they defeated Oxford United. Luton had appeared in one play-off final before this match – the 2012 Conference Premier play-off final, which they lost 2–1 to York City. Luton had not played in the top flight since 1992, when defeat on the final day of the season meant they were relegated while Coventry stayed up. In addition to the 2012 play-off final, Luton had completed seven other matches at Wembley before this one, including wins over Arsenal in the 1988 Football League Cup final and Scunthorpe in the 2009 Football League Trophy final, as well as five defeats. During the regular season, both matches between the two clubs finished in draws – a 2–2 result at Kenilworth Road in September 2022, followed by a 1–1 match at the Coventry Building Society Arena the following February. Gyökeres was Coventry's highest scorer with 21 goals while Luton's top marksman was Carlton Morris with 20.

Coventry manager, Mark Robins described the final as "one for the romantics" due to the rise of both teams from the lower tiers of English football, both clubs having been in League Two as recently as the 2017–18 season. Robins's Luton counterpart Rob Edwards echoed this sentiment before the match, noting the two clubs' recent history meant it was "not the play-off final people would have picked at the beginning of the season" while expressing his happiness that Luton could now "spend time in this position at the right end of the table".

The final was refereed by Michael Oliver, with Stuart Burt and Lee Betts as his assistants, and Graham Scott the fourth official. From 2022, the EFL had announced that the video assistant referee (VAR) system would be used at all play-off finals, and Andre Marriner was appointed in this role with Richard West his assistant.

Success in the final was estimated by the accountancy company Deloitte to be worth £170 million to the winning team over the next three seasons.

=== Summary ===
The match kicked off at 4:45 p.m. in front of a crowd 85,711, with more than 36,000 supports of each of the two teams present. Luton had the better of the opening phase of the match, and thought they'd scored after five minutes when Osho put the ball into the net from close range, but it was ruled out for offside. They suffered a setback on 10 minutes when their captain, Lockyer, collapsed while running off the ball, and had to be substituted. Lockyer was taken to hospital and had to undergo heart surgery. Luton's Morris had two chances to score on 14 and 20 minutes, before his side took the lead on 23 minutes. Adebayo received possession from a long ball forward and ran with it, beating Coventry defender Kyle McFadzean twice before passing to Jordan Clark who scored. Luton continued to dominate play in the minutes after their goal and had several opportunities to extend their lead. On 29 minutes, Adebayo missed a chance following a blocked Morris shot and, on 41 minutes, Luton had a goal disallowed when the ball went into the Coventry goal off Adebayo's arm following a Callum Doyle goal-line clearance. Luton's dominance waned towards the end of the half: Hamer had Coventry's first significant chance of the match on 43 minutes when he headed the ball over the crossbar following Jake Bidwell's cross, and they earned a free kick in an attacking position during stoppage time but Luton's goalkeeper Ethan Horvath was able to claim the ball.

Coventry brought on Matt Godden at half time, in place of Jamie Allen, adopting a more attacking formation. Their defender Luke McNally was booked early in the second half for a foul on Adebayo. Coventry began to dominate in the early stages of the half, earning a corner on 49 minutes and Gyökeres having a chance a minute later when he toed the ball past Osho and Horvath but he was unable to reconnect with the ball in front of the goal. Liam Kelly then had a chance for Coventry shortly afterwards, but his shot went over the crossbar. Coventry equalized on 66 minutes when Gyökeres ran down the left side of the field before crossing it for Hamer, scored past Horvath into the bottom-right corner of the goal. Gyökeres had a chance to give Coventry the lead on 73 minutes when he received the ball near the penalty spot, but his shot was too high. A minute later, Hamer sustained an ankle injury when landing on the ground and he eventually had to be substituted by Robins, Kasey Palmer replacing him. There were some chances for both sides in the remainder of the half, including one by Godden, who shot over the crossbar after receiving the ball from Gyökeres close to the penalty spot. There were eight minutes of stoppage time at the end of the second half with both teams trying to find a winning goal, but neither were successful. With the game finishing 1–1 after 90 minutes, it went to extra time.

Coventry started extra time with a long-range shot by Gyökeres which was saved by Horvath and then had an attacking free kick following a foul by Onyedinma, but it came to nothing. McNally then fouled Morris to give Luton a free kick but Coventry cleared it. Nine minutes into extra time, Clark ended up on the ground after competing for the ball with Wilson in the Coventry penalty area. He appealed for a penalty, but instead received a yellow card for diving. VAR confirmed that there was no penalty. The second half of extra time saw fewer chances as the players became tired, and on 24 minutes, Doyle had to be substituted with an injury, Jonathan Panzo coming on in his place. Panzo made an error with his first touch of the ball, and Joe Taylor took advantage to score what he thought was Luton's second goal past Wilson. After a VAR check, however, the goal was ruled out as Taylor was adjudged to have committed a handball prior to scoring. Luton had one more change in stoppage time, but Berry headed it wide and the game went to a penalty shoot-out.

The first five kicks for each side were scored – Morris, Taylor, Marvelous Nakamba, Clark and Luke Berry scoring for Luton and Godden, Gyökeres, Ben Sheaf, Josh Eccles and Kelly for Coventry. This took the shoot-out to sudden death. Dan Potts scored again for Luton but Fankaty Dabo then missed for Coventry, sealing a 6–5 shoot-out win for Luton and promotion to the Premier League.

=== Details ===
27 May 2023
16:45 BST

Coventry City	1–1 (a.e.t.)	Luton Town
Hamer 66'	Report	Clark 23'
Penalties
Godden (penalty scored); Gyökeres (penalty scored); Sheaf (penalty scored); Eccles (penalty scored); Kelly (penalty scored); Dabo (penalty missed)	5–6	(penalty scored) Morris; (penalty scored) Taylor; (penalty scored) Nakamba; (penalty scored) Clark; (penalty scored) Berry; (penalty scored) Potts

Wembley Stadium, London
Attendance: 85,711
Referee: Michael Oliver

Coventry City	Luton Town

GK	13	(England) Ben Wilson
CB	5	(England) Kyle McFadzean
CB	16	(Republic of Ireland) Luke McNally	(yellow card) 46'
CB	3	(England) Callum Doyle		(substituted off) 115'
DM	6	(Scotland) Liam Kelly (c)
DM	14	(England) Ben Sheaf
RM	7	(England) Brooke Norton-Cuffy		(substituted off) 90'
CM	8	(England) Jamie Allen		(substituted off) 46'
CM	38	(Netherlands) Gustavo Hamer		(substituted off) 80'
LM	27	(England) Jake Bidwell
CF	17	(Sweden) Viktor Gyökeres
Substitutes:
GK	1	(England) Simon Moore
DF	2	(England) Jonathan Panzo		(substituted on) 115'
DF	11	(England) Josh Wilson-Esbrand
DF	23	(England) Fankaty Dabo		(substituted on) 90'
MF	28	(England) Josh Eccles		(substituted on) 102'
MF	45	(Jamaica) Kasey Palmer		(substituted on) 80'	(substituted off) 102'
FW	24	(England) Matt Godden		(substituted on) 46'
Head coach:
(England) Mark Robins

GK	34	(United States) Ethan Horvath
CB	32	(England) Gabriel Osho		(substituted off) 112'
CB	4	(Wales) Tom Lockyer (c)		(substituted off) 12'
CB	29	(Jamaica) Amari'i Bell
RM	2	(England) Cody Drameh
CM	13	(Zimbabwe) Marvelous Nakamba
CM	17	(Democratic Republic of the Congo) Pelly Ruddock Mpanzu		(substituted off) 98'
LM	45	(England) Alfie Doughty		(substituted off) 84'
AM	18	(England) Jordan Clark	(yellow card) 99'
CF	11	(England) Elijah Adebayo		(substituted off) 105'
CF	9	(England) Carlton Morris
Substitutes:
GK	1	(England) James Shea
DF	3	(England) Dan Potts	(substituted on) 112'
DF	16	(England) Reece Burke	(substituted on) 12'
MF	8	(England) Luke Berry	(substituted on) 98'
MF	22	(Scotland) Allan Campbell
MF	23	(Nigeria) Fred Onyedinma	(substituted on) 84'
FW	25	(Wales) Joe Taylor	(substituted on) 105'
Head coach:
(Wales) Rob Edwards

Man of the Match:
Elijah Adebayo (Luton Town)

== Post-match ==
Edwards said after the match that "it feels incredible", although he caveated this by saying his thoughts were principally with the hospitalized Lockyer, noting that "health is the most important thing, more important than football". Edwards also commented on the upcoming challenge of playing in the Premier League, saying "we're not going to go mental" and indicating that he would continue his philosophy that the club should "play to [its] strengths". Luton's midfielder Pelly Ruddock Mpanzu, who had been with the club since 2014 when it was a non-League club playing in the fifth tier of English football, was jubilant, noting that he had "completed football" and joking that he planned to retire in the summer. Mpanzu then said: "it's been a journey, through the highs and lows but you've got to believe in yourself. Here I am, a Premier League player." Robins congratulated Luton on their victory, stating that "once the game is over and done with you've got to congratulate the winners; they've come out on top today, however tight the game may have been". He also expressed a desire to bounce back from the defeat, saying "we have to get back here as quickly as we possibly can".

On 29 May, Luton hosted a victory parade with an open-top bus to celebrate their promotion, which drove from Kenilworth Gardens to St George's Square. The event was attended by thousands of supporters and concluded with the team and manager brandishing the trophy on the balcony of Luton Town Hall.

Luton's stay in the Premier League was limited to just one season as they finished in 18th place out of 20 teams in 2023–24 and were relegated back to the Championship. They suffered a further relegation from the Championship to League One the following season. Three years after the game, Coventry were eventually promoted back to the Premier League as winners of the 2025/26 Championship.
