= Michael Rose (footballer, born 1995) =

Scottish footballer

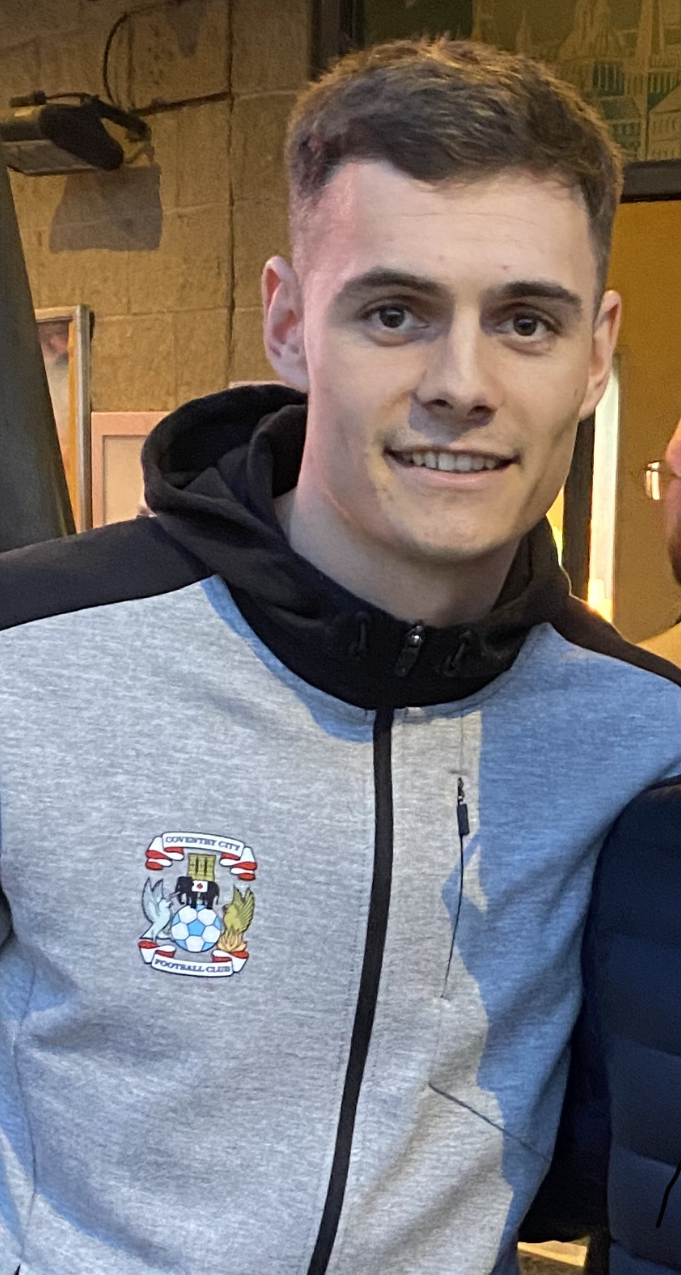
- Rose with Coventry City in June 2022

Personal information
- Full name: Michael Alexander Rose
- Date of birth: 11 October 1995 (age 31)
- Place of birth: Aberdeen, Scotland
- Height: 6 ft 2 in (1.89 m)
- Position: Centre-back

Team information
- Current team: Salford City
- Number: 5

Youth career
- Glendale
- 2003–2007: Aberdeen
- 2007–2010: Lewis United
- 2010–2015: Aberdeen

Senior career*
Years	Team	Apps	(Gls)
2015–2016	Aberdeen	1	(0)
2015	→ Forfar Athletic (loan)	7	(0)
2016–2019	Ayr United	88	(5)
2019–2023	Coventry City	101	(4)
2023–2025	Stoke City	59	(1)
2025–	Salford City	3	(0)
- * Club domestic league appearances and goals as of 17:54, 20 September 2025 (UTC)

Michael Alexander Rose (born 11 October 1995) is a Scottish professional footballer who plays as a centre-back for EFL League Two club Salford City.

Rose began his career with Aberdeen and spent time on loan for Forfar Athletic before signing for Ayr United in June 2016. After three seasons at Somerset Park, Rose moved to English club Coventry City in July 2019. He spent four years with the Sky Blues before joining Stoke City in July 2023.

== Career ==
=== Aberdeen ===
Raised in Bridge of Don, Rose attended Oldmachar Academy and started playing youth football with Glendale and Aberdeen until he was released at the age of 12. He played for Lewis United for three years before he was re-signed by Aberdeen, signing a professional contract at 17. Before making a senior appearance for Aberdeen, he joined Scottish League One side Forfar Athletic on loan for one month on 5 November 2015, with the loan then being extended for a further month on 7 December 2015. He made seven appearances with Forfar before returning to Aberdeen.

Rose made his debut for Aberdeen in a 3–0 defeat against St Johnstone on 22 April 2016. Rose was released by Aberdeen at the end of the 2015–16 season.

=== Ayr United ===
After leaving Aberdeen, Rose signed for newly promoted Scottish Championship side Ayr United in June 2016. In the 2016–17 season Rose made 24 appearances as Ayr finished bottom of the table and were relegated to League One. Ayr had much more successful 2017–18 campaign as they finished as champions on the final day of the season. Rose made 44 appearances in 2018–19 as Ayr reached the Premiership play–offs but were beaten 4–2 on aggregate by Inverness Caledonian Thistle. At the end of the season Rose was named in the PFA Scotland Scottish Championship Team of the Year.

=== Coventry City ===
Rose signed a pre-contract agreement with EFL League One side Coventry City in January 2019. Rose played 40 times in 2019–20 as Coventry won the League One title after the season was ended early due to the coronavirus pandemic. He signed a new three-year contract with Coventry in October 2020. Rose had an injury hit 2020–21 season and was restricted to 18 appearances.

Rose played 32 times in 2021–22, as Coventry finished in 12th position. He made 26 appearances in 2022–23, as Coventry reached the Championship play-off final where they lost on penalties to Luton Town. He was released by the club at the end of the season.

=== Stoke City ===
On 17 July 2023, Rose joined fellow Championship side Stoke City on a free transfer, signing a two-year deal. He scored his first goal for Stoke on 28 October 2023 in a 2–0 win against Middlesbrough. Rose made 41 appearances for Stoke in 2023–24 as the team avoided relegation, finishing 17th. In 2024–25, Rose competed with Ben Gibson, Ashley Phillips and Ben Wilmot at centre-back, making 25 appearances. He departed the club upon the expiration of his contract at the end of the season.

=== Salford City ===
On 21 August 2025, Rose joined League Two club Salford City on a three-year deal.

== Career statistics ==
As of match played 20 September 2025

Appearances and goals by club, season and competition
Club	Season	League			National Cup (Note: Includes FA Cup and Scottish FA Cup)		League Cup (Note: Includes EFL Cup and Scottish League Cup)		Other		Total	
Club	Season	Division	Apps	Goals	Apps	Goals	Apps	Goals	Apps	Goals	Apps	Goals
Aberdeen	2015–16	Scottish Premiership	1	0	0	0	0	0	0	0	1	0
Forfar Athletic (loan)	2015–16	Scottish League One	7	0	0	0	0	0	0	0	7	0
Ayr United	2016–17	Scottish Championship	20	1	4	0	0	0	0	0	24	1
Ayr United	2017–18	Scottish League One	34	2	3	0	2	0	1 (Note: Appearance(s) in the Scottish Challenge Cup.)	0	40	2
Ayr United	2018–19	Scottish Championship	34	2	2	0	5	0	3 (Note: One Appearance in the Scottish Challenge Cup and Two Appearances in 2019 Scottish Premiership Play-offs)	1	44	3
Ayr United	Total		88	5	9	0	7	0	4	1	108	6
Coventry City	2019–20	League One	31	2	6	0	2	0	1 (Note: Appearance(s) in the EFL Trophy.)	0	40	2
Coventry City	2020–21	Championship	17	0	0	0	1	0	—		18	0
Coventry City	2021–22	Championship	29	2	2	0	1	0	—		32	2
Coventry City	2022–23	Championship	24	0	1	0	1	0	0	0	26	0
Coventry City	Total		101	4	9	0	5	0	1	0	116	4
Stoke City	2023–24	Championship	37	1	1	0	3	0	—		41	1
Stoke City	2024–25	Championship	22	0	1	0	2	1	—		25	1
Stoke City	Total		59	1	2	0	5	1	0	0	66	2
Salford City	2025–26	League Two	3	0	0	0	0	0	1	0	4	0
Career total			259	10	20	0	17	1	6	1	302	12

== Honours ==
Ayr United

- Scottish League One: 2017–18

Coventry City

- EFL League One: 2019–20
