= Josh Wilson-Esbrand =

English footballer (born 2002)

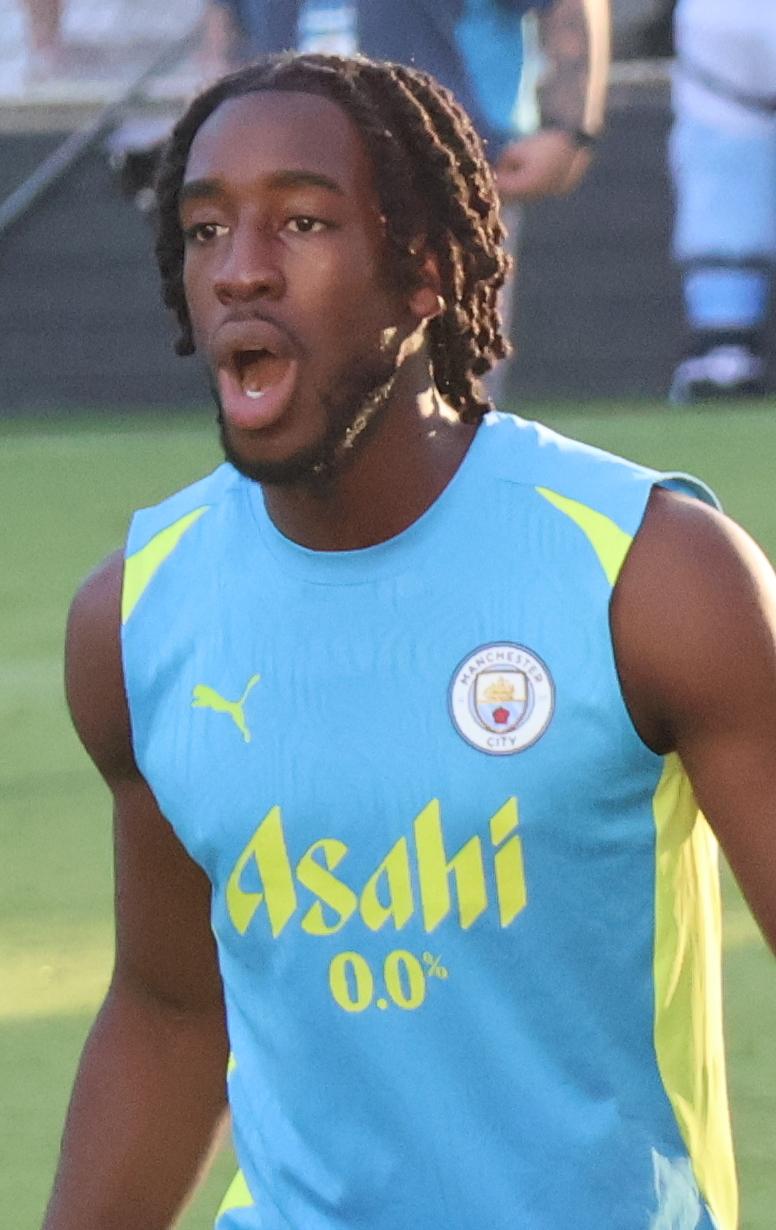
- Wilson-Esbrand with Manchester City in 2024

Personal information
- Full name: Joshua Darius Kamani Wilson-Esbrand
- Date of birth: 26 December 2002 (age 23)
- Place of birth: Hackney, England
- Height: 5 ft 9 in (1.76 m)
- Position: Left-back

Team information
- Current team: Manchester City
- Number: 97

Youth career
- –2019: West Ham United
- 2019–2021: Manchester City

Senior career*
Years	Team	Apps	(Gls)
2021–	Manchester City	0	(0)
2023	→ Coventry City (loan)	14	(0)
2023–2024	→ Reims (loan)	11	(1)
2024	→ Cardiff City (loan)	11	(0)
2025	→ Stoke City (loan)	6	(0)
2025–2026	→ Radomiak Radom (loan)	8	(0)

International career
2017	England U16	1	(0)
2019	England U18	2	(0)
2021	England U20	1	(0)
2023	England U21	2	(0)
- * Club domestic league appearances and goals as of 10:54, 2 July 2026 (UTC)

Joshua Darius Kamani Wilson-Esbrand (born 26 December 2002) is an English professional footballer who plays as a left-back for Premier League club Manchester City.

== Early life ==
Joshua Darius Kamani Wilson-Esbrand was born on 26 December 2002 in Hackney, Greater London. He is of Jamaican descent.

== Club career ==
In 2019, Wilson-Esbrand left West Ham United to join the academy of Manchester City. On 21 September 2021, he made his professional debut when he was named in the starting line up for Manchester City's EFL Cup tie against Wycombe Wanderers. He signed a five-year contract with Manchester City in February 2022.

On 10 January 2023, Wilson-Esbrand joined EFL Championship club Coventry City on a loan for the remainder of the 2022–23 season. He was part of the Coventry side that reached the play-offs and was an unused substitute as Coventry were beaten 6–5 on penalties after extra time ended 1–1 at Wembley Stadium by Luton Town in the 2023 EFL Championship play-off final.

In July 2023, Wilson-Esbrand joined French Ligue 1 side Reims on loan for the 2023–24 season. After making nine appearances for Reims he was recalled and loaned out to Cardiff City for the remainder of the season. He made 11 appearances for the Bluebirds before his season was ended early due to injury.

On 22 January 2025, Wilson-Esbrand was loaned out to EFL Championship club Stoke City until the end of the 2024–25 season. On the same day, he made his debut for the club in a 3–1 away defeat against Portsmouth, providing the assist to Ben Wilmot for Stoke's only goal of the game. Wilson-Esbrand made seven appearances for Stoke, as they finished in 18th position, avoiding relegation on the final day of the season.

On 8 September 2025, Wilson-Esbrand joined Ekstraklasa club Radomiak Radom on a season-long loan.

== International career ==
In November 2019, Wilson-Esbrand represented the England national under-18 team. On 11 November 2021, he made his under-20 debut in a 2–0 defeat to Portugal in the 2021–22 Under 20 Elite League.

On 19 November 2023, Wilson-Esbrand made his England U21 debut as a substitute in the 3–0 2025 UEFA European Under-21 Championship qualification victory away to Serbia.

== Career statistics ==
As of match played on 20 March 2026

Appearances and goals by club, season and competition
Club	Season	League			National cup (Note: Includes FA Cup, Coupe de France)		League cup (Note: Includes EFL Cup)		Other		Total	
Club	Season	Division	Apps	Goals	Apps	Goals	Apps	Goals	Apps	Goals	Apps	Goals
Manchester City U21	2020–21	—			—		—		1 (Note: Appearance(s) in EFL Trophy)	0	1	0
Manchester City U21	2021–22	—			—		—		2	0	2	0
Manchester City U21	2022–23	—			—		—		2	0	2	0
Manchester City U21	2024–25	—			—		—		1	0	1	0
Manchester City U21	Total		—		—		—		6	0	6	0
Manchester City	2021–22	Premier League	0	0	0	0	1	0	0	0	1	0
Manchester City	2022–23	Premier League	0	0	0	0	0	0	2 (Note: Appearances in UEFA Champions League)	0	2	0
Manchester City	2023–24	Premier League	0	0	0	0	0	0	0	0	0	0
Manchester City	2024–25	Premier League	0	0	0	0	0	0	0	0	0	0
Manchester City	Total		0	0	0	0	1	0	2	0	3	0
Coventry City (loan)	2022–23	Championship	14	0	0	0	0	0	—		14	0
Reims (loan)	2023–24	Ligue 1	9	1	0	0	—		—		9	1
Cardiff City (loan)	2023–24	Championship	11	0	0	0	0	0	—		11	0
Stoke City (loan)	2024–25	Championship	6	0	1	0	0	0	—		7	0
Radomiak Radom (loan)	2025–26	Ekstraklasa	8	0	0	0	—		—		8	0
Career total			48	1	1	0	1	0	8	0	58	1
