= 2022–23 Coventry City F.C. season =

Coventry City
2022–23 season
- Owner: Joy Seppala (SISU, until 10 January); Doug King (from 10 January)
- Chairman: Tim Fisher (until 10 January); Doug King (Executive chairman) (from 12 January)
- Manager: Mark Robins
- Stadium: Coventry Building Society Arena
- Championship: 5th
- Play-offs: Runners-up
- FA Cup: Third round
- EFL Cup: First round
- Top goalscorer: League: Viktor Gyökeres (21); All: Viktor Gyökeres (22)
Home colours	Away colours	Third colours

The 2022–23 season was the 139th season in the existence of Coventry City Football Club and the club's third consecutive season in the Championship. In addition to the league, they also competed in the FA Cup and EFL Cup.

== Pre-season and friendlies ==
The Sky Blues announced their first two pre-season fixtures on May 24, with a trips to Walsall and Leamington added to the schedule. A third against Oxford United was confirmed on 31 May. Another away pre-season trip was added to the schedule on June 8, against Portsmouth. A training camp in Spain, along with a friendly against Nottingham Forest, was also added to the schedule on June 27. They had an additional mid-season tour to Spain in November 2022, during the break for the 2022 FIFA World Cup.

Win Draw Loss Fixtures

2 July 2022 Friendly	Leamington	1–3	Coventry City	Leamington Spa
13:00 BST	Turner 2'	Report	Godden 60', 66'; Tavares 73'	Stadium: Your Co-op Community Stadium

8 July 2022 Friendly	Coventry City	3–1	Nottingham Forest	San Pedro del Pinatar, Spain
18:30 CEST	Godden 45+4'; Walker 54', 75'	Report	Biancone 40'	Stadium: Pinatar Arena

12 July 2022 Friendly	Coventry City	1–0	Forest Green Rovers	Lilleshall Hall
13:00 BST	Sheaf 11'	Report		Stadium: Lilleshall National Sports Centre; Attendance: 0 (behind-closed-doors)

13 July 2022 Friendly	Wolverhampton Wanderers U23s	1–8	Coventry City	Compton
14:00 BST	No. 9 (?)	Report	Waghorn (?); Godden (?); Rose (?); Gyökeres (?); Sheaf (?); Hamer (?)	Stadium: Sir Jack Hayward Training Ground; Attendance: 0 (behind-closed-doors)

16 July 2022 Friendly	Oxford United	0–2	Coventry City	Littlemore
15:00 BST			Panzo 40', 59'	Stadium: Kassam Stadium

19 July 2022 Friendly	Walsall	0–3	Coventry City	Bescot
19:30 BST			Palmer 51'; Eccles 65'; Tavares 78'	Stadium: Banks's Stadium

23 July 2022 Friendly	Portsmouth	0–2	Coventry City	Milton
15:00 BST		Report	Gyökeres 54'; Panzo 72'	Stadium: Fratton Park; Attendance: 5,694

== Competitions ==
=== Overall record ===
Competition	First match	Last match	Starting round	Record							
Competition	First match	Last match	Starting round	Pld	W	D	L	GF	GA	GD	Win %
Championship	31 July 2022	May 2023	Matchday 1	46	18	16	12	58	46	+12	39.13
FA Cup	7 January 2023	7 January 2023	Third round	1	0	0	1	3	4	−1	0.00
EFL Cup	10 August 2022	10 August 2022	First round	1	0	0	1	1	4	−3	0.00
Total				48	18	16	14	62	54	+8	37.50

Last updated: 8 May 2023
Source: [ Soccerway]

=== Championship ===
==== League table ====
Pos	Team	Pld	W	D	L	GF	GA	GD	Pts	Promotion, qualification or relegation
2	Sheffield United (P)	46	28	7	11	73	39	+34	91	Promotion to Premier League
3	Luton Town (O, P)	46	21	17	8	57	39	+18	80	Qualification for Championship play-offs
4	Middlesbrough	46	22	9	15	84	56	+28	75	Qualification for Championship play-offs
5	Coventry City	46	18	16	12	58	46	+12	70	Qualification for Championship play-offs
6	Sunderland	46	18	15	13	68	55	+13	69	Qualification for Championship play-offs
7	Blackburn Rovers	46	20	9	17	52	54	−2	69	
8	Millwall	46	19	11	16	57	50	+7	68	

Source: EFL Official Website
Rules for classification: 1) Points; 2) Goal difference; 3) Number of goals scored; 4) Head-to-head results; 5) Wins; 6) Away goals; 7) Penalty points (sec 9.5); 8) 12-point sending off offences
(O) Play-off winners; (P) Promoted

==== Results summary ====
Overall								Home						Away					
Pld	W	D	L	GF	GA	GD	Pts	W	D	L	GF	GA	GD	W	D	L	GF	GA	GD
46	18	16	12	58	46	+12	70	11	7	5	30	24	+6	7	9	7	28	22	+6

Last updated: 8 May 2023.
Source: [ Soccerway]

==== Results by round ====
Round	1	2	3	4	5	6	7	8	9	10	11	12	13	14	15	16	17	18	19	20	21	22	23	24	25	26	27	28	29	30	31	32	33	34	35	36	37	38	39	40	41	42	43	44	45	46
Ground	A	A	A	H	A	A	A	H	A	H	A	H	A	H	H	H	A	H	H	A	H	H	A	H	H	A	H	H	A	H	H	A	H	A	A	H	A	A	H	A	H	A	A	H	H	A
Result	D	L	L	L	L	D	D	W	D	L	W	W	W	D	L	W	W	W	W	L	D	W	L	D	D	L	L	W	L	D	W	W	W	D	W	D	D	W	L	D	D	W	D	W	W	D
Position	8	21	24	24	24	24	24	24	24	24	24	23	22	22	22	20	15	12	11	15	14	8	12	13	14	15	15	13	15	14	11	11	11	10	8	9	9	8	8	9	9	7	8	5	5	5

Updated to match(es) played on 8 May 2023. Source: [ Soccerway]
A = Away; H = Home; W = Win; D = Draw; L = Loss; P = Postponed

==== Matches ====
Win Draw Loss Fixtures

On 23 June, the league fixtures were announced.

31 July 2022 1	Sunderland	1–1	Coventry City	Sunderland
12:00 BST	Clarke 12', (yellow card) 51'; Evans (yellow card) 55'; Ballard (yellow card) 76'; O'Nien (yellow card) 90+4'	Report	Hamer (yellow card) 20'; Gyökeres 84'	Stadium: Stadium of Light; Attendance: 40,851; Referee: Darren Bond

13 August 2022 2	Millwall	3–2	Coventry City	London
15:00 BST	Shackleton (yellow card) 18'; Burey (yellow card) 30'; Cooper 36'; Honeyman 53'; Afobe (yellow card) 63'; McNamara (yellow card) 68'; Saville 85'	Report	McFadzean 2' (yellow card) 82'; Godden 28'; Hamer (yellow card) 37' (yellow-red card) 67'; Bidwell (yellow card) 64'	Stadium: The Den; Attendance: 13,880; Referee: Bobby Madley

27 August 2022 3	Hull City	3–2	Coventry City	Kingston upon Hull
15:00 BST	Estupiñán 11', 42', 56'; Woods (yellow card) 49'; Slater (yellow card) 81'; Ingram (yellow card) 90+4'	Report	Godden 29' (pen.), 69'; Rose (yellow card) 58'; McFadzean (yellow card) 82'	Stadium: MKM Stadium; Attendance: 17,874; Referee: Oliver Langford

31 August 2022 4	Coventry City	0–1	Preston North End	Coventry
19:45 BST	Wilson (yellow card) 36'	Report	Storey (yellow card) 28'; Jakobsen 73'; McCann (yellow card) 90+5'	Stadium: Coventry Building Society Arena; Attendance: 18,913; Referee: John Busby

3 September 2022 5	Norwich City	3–0	Coventry City	Norwich
15:00 BST	Pukki 14'; Byram (yellow card) 45'; Sargent 45+1'; Dowell 81'	Report		Stadium: Carrow Road; Attendance: 26,487; Referee: Gavin Ward

14 September 2022 6	Luton Town	2–2	Coventry City	Luton
19:45 BST	Morris 4', 15'; Onyedinma (yellow card) 31'; Lansbury (yellow card) 88'	Report	Gyökeres 11'; Hamer 62'; Sheaf (yellow card) 68'	Stadium: Kenilworth Road; Attendance: 9,546; Referee: Andy Davies

17 September 2022 7	Birmingham City	0–0	Coventry City	Birmingham
15:00 BST	Sanderson (yellow card) 87'	Report	Sheaf (yellow card) 53'; Panzo (yellow card) 73'; Dabo (yellow card) 87'; Hamer (red card) 89'	Stadium: St Andrew's Stadium; Attendance: 16,633; Referee: Graham Scott

1 October 2022 8	Coventry City	1–0	Middlesbrough	Coventry
15:00 BST	Gyökeres 17'; Dabo (yellow card) 49'; Palmer (yellow card) 56'; Bidwell (yellow card) 90+4'; Wilson (yellow card) 90+5'	Report	Jones (yellow card) 64'	Stadium: Coventry Building Society Arena; Attendance: 19,788; Referee: Steve Martin

4 October 2022 9	Bristol City	0–0	Coventry City	Bristol
19:45 BST	Atkinson (yellow card) 11'; Williams (yellow card) 78'	Report	Sheaf (yellow card) 79'	Stadium: Ashton Gate; Attendance: 18,658; Referee: James Bell

8 October 2022 10	Coventry City	0–1	Burnley	Coventry
15:00 BST	Gyökeres (yellow card) 45+4'	Report	Beyer (yellow card) 22'; Cork (yellow card) 30'; Tella 39'; Maatsen (yellow card) 44'	Stadium: Coventry Building Society Arena; Attendance: 19,445; Referee: John Busby

15 October 2022 11	Cardiff City	0–1	Coventry City	Cardiff
15:00 BST	Harris (yellow card) 56'	Report	Gyökeres 34' (yellow card) 40'; Sheaf (yellow card) 48'; Panzo (yellow card) 56'	Stadium: Cardiff City Stadium; Attendance: 19,861; Referee: Bobby Madley

19 October 2022 12	Coventry City	1–0	Sheffield United	Coventry
19:45 BST	Sheaf (yellow card) 40'; Dabo (yellow card) 42'; Bidwell (yellow card) 58'; McFadzean (yellow card) 76'; Waghorn 87' (pen.)	Report	McAtee (yellow card) 38'	Stadium: Coventry Building Society Arena; Attendance: 17,913; Referee: Keith Stroud

22 October 2022 13	Stoke City	0–2	Coventry City	Stoke-on-Trent
15:00 BST	Laurent (yellow card) 90+3'	Report	Allen 51'; Palmer (yellow card) 56'; Hamer 65'	Stadium: Bet365 Stadium; Attendance: 22,453; Referee: James Linington

25 October 2022 14	Coventry City	2–2	Rotherham United	Coventry
19:45 BST	McFadzean (yellow card) 15'; Hamer 76'; Gyökeres (yellow card) 85' (goal) 90+1' (pen.)	Report	Hall (yellow card) 35'; Bramall 43'; Odoffin (yellow card) 50'; Washington 80'; Norton-Cuffy (yellow card) 82'	Stadium: Coventry Building Society Arena; Attendance: 18,953; Referee: Andy Davies

29 October 2022 15	Coventry City	1–2	Blackpool	Coventry
15:00 BST	Sheaf (yellow card) 13'; Palmer 40'	Report	Madine 53', (yellow card) 90+3'; Dougall (yellow card) 56'; Patino (yellow card) 65'; Yates 80', (yellow card) 90+3'	Stadium: Coventry Building Society Arena; Attendance: 18,924; Referee: Darren Bond

1 November 2022 16	Coventry City	1–0	Blackburn Rovers	Coventry
19:45 GMT	Allen 41'; Eccles (yellow card) 56'; Palmer (yellow card) 90+3'	Report	Hyam (yellow card) 39'; Wharton (yellow card) 76'; Garrett (red card) 85'; Kaminski (yellow card) 90+3'; Ayala (yellow card) 90+4'	Stadium: The Coventry Building Society Arena; Attendance: 16,530; Referee: Tim Robinson

5 November 2022 17	Watford	0–1	Coventry City	Watford
15:00 GMT	Sierralta (yellow card) 69'; Choudhury (yellow card) 74'; Kamara (yellow card) 83'	Report	Gyökeres 50'; Eccles (yellow card) 60'; Wilson (yellow card) 90+5'	Stadium: Vicarage Road; Attendance: 20,164; Referee: Leigh Doughty

8 November 2022 18	Coventry City	2–0	Wigan Athletic	Coventry
19:45 GMT	Sheaf (yellow card) 38'; Panzo (yellow card) 63'; Hamer 77'; Gyökeres 90+5'	Report	Whatmough (yellow card) 21'	Stadium: The Coventry Building Society Arena; Attendance: 17,227; Referee: Steve Martin

12 November 2022 19	Coventry City	2–0	Queens Park Rangers	Coventry
15:00 GMT	Gyökeres 11', 78'; Doyle (yellow card) 27'; McFadzean (yellow card) 86'	Report	Field (yellow card) 65'; Chair (yellow card) 76'	Stadium: The Coventry Building Society Arena; Attendance: 23,201; Referee: John Busby

Mid-season break for 2022 FIFA World Cup

10 December 2022 20	Reading	1–0	Coventry City	Reading
14:00 GMT	Hendrick (yellow card) 45+4'; Mbengue 57', (yellow card) 90'	Report	Doyle (yellow card) 29'; Allen (yellow card) 63'; Eccles (yellow card) 75'	Stadium: Select Car Leasing Stadium; Attendance: 15,213; Referee: Matt Donohue

17 December 2022 21	Coventry City	3–3	Swansea City	Coventry
15:00 GMT	Panzo 29'; Allen 47'; Gyökeres 54'	Report	Wood (yellow card) 20'; Fulton (yellow card) 57', (goal) 76'; Piroe 68'; Cullen 84'	Stadium: Coventry Building Society Arena; Attendance: 17,985; Referee: Robert Jones

21 December 2022 22	Coventry City	1–0	West Bromwich Albion	Coventry
19:45 GMT	Burroughs (yellow card) 64'; Bidwell (yellow card) 85'; Gyökeres 90+3' (pen.)	Report	Gardner-Hickman (yellow card) 90+2'	Stadium: Coventry Building Society Arena; Attendance: 22,519; Referee: Keith Stroud

26 December 2022 23	Sheffield United	3–1	Coventry City	Sheffield
15:00 GMT	McAtee 35'; Clark 52'; Doyle 71'; Egan (yellow card) 41' (yellow-red card) 77'	Report	Sheaf (yellow card) 24'; Bidwell (yellow card) 60'; Palmer (yellow card) 68'; Gyökeres 75'	Stadium: Bramall Lane; Attendance: 29,651; Referee: Matt Donohue

29 December 2022 24	Coventry City	0–0	Cardiff City	Coventry
19:45 GMT	Sheaf (yellow card) 62'; Panzo (yellow card) 76'	Report	Kipré (yellow card) 45+3'	Stadium: Coventry Building Society Arena; Attendance: 21,421; Referee: Anthony Backhouse

1 January 2023 25	Coventry City	1–1	Bristol City	Coventry
15:00 GMT	Bidwell 12'; Panzo (yellow card) 43'; Dabo (yellow card) 72'; Allen (yellow card) 90+3'	Report	Semenyo 28'; Vyner (yellow card) 35'; Weimann (yellow card) 76'	Stadium: Coventry Building Society Arena; Attendance: 19,547; Referee: Jeremy Simpson

14 January 2023 26	Burnley	1–0	Coventry City	Burnley
15:00 GMT	Cork (yellow card) 11'; Taylor (yellow card) 59'; Tella (yellow card) 81'; Beyer 82'	Report	Norton-Cuffy (yellow card) 50'; Dabo (yellow card) 79'; Wilson (yellow card) 81'	Stadium: Turf Moor; Attendance: 21,290; Referee: David Webb

21 January 2023 27	Coventry City	2–4	Norwich City	Coventry
12:30 GMT	Allen 20'; Palmer 26'	Report	Rose 6' (o.g.); Hernández 10'; Sargent 18'; Dowell 65'; Aarons (yellow card) 89'	Stadium: Coventry Building Society Arena; Attendance: 19,877; Referee: Joshua Smith

28 January 2023 28	Coventry City	2–0	Huddersfield Town	Coventry
15:00 GMT	Panzo (yellow card) 4'; Hamer 53'; Palmer 71'	Report	Helik (yellow card) 52'; Lowton (yellow card) 89'	Stadium: CBS Arena; Attendance: 17,557; Referee: Seb Stockbridge

3 February 2023 29	West Bromwich Albion	1–0	Coventry City	West Bromwich
20:00 GMT	Diangana 15'; Yokuşlu (yellow card) 64'; Molumby (yellow card) 82'; Furlong (yellow card) 90+2'; O'Shea (yellow card) 90+5'	Report	Panzo (yellow card) 82'	Stadium: The Hawthorns; Attendance: 24,719; Referee: Gavin Ward

11 February 2023 30	Coventry City	1–1	Luton Town	Coventry
15:00 GMT	Godden 45+1' (pen.); Wilson-Esbrand (yellow card) 80' (yellow-red card) 85'; McFadzean (yellow card) 86'	Report	Lockyer 1'; Burke (yellow card) 44'; Osho (yellow card) 45'; Bell (yellow card) 64'; Morris (yellow card) 86'	Stadium: Coventry Building Society Arena; Attendance: 20,366; Referee: Steve Martin

14 February 2023 31	Coventry City	1–0	Millwall	Coventry
19:45 GMT	Norton-Cuffy (yellow card) 47'; Gyökeres 67'	Report	Mitchell (yellow card) 27'; Cooper (yellow card) 41'; Saville (yellow card) 55'	Stadium: Coventry Building Society Arena; Attendance: 16,446; Referee: Matt Donohue

18 February 2023 32	Rotherham United	0–2	Coventry City	Rotherham
15:00 GMT	Humphreys (yellow card) 33'; Ogbene (yellow card) 83'	Report	Norton-Cuffy (yellow card) 17'; Doyle (yellow card) 43'; Allen 46'; Gyökeres (yellow card) 83', (goal) 90+2'	Stadium: New York Stadium; Attendance: 10,856; Referee: Keith Stroud

25 February 2023 33	Coventry City	2–1	Sunderland	Coventry
12:30 GMT	Allen 25'; Palmer (yellow card) 39'; Eccles (yellow card) 45+2'; Wilson (yellow card) 86'; Gyökeres 89'	Report	Neil (yellow card) 23'; Diallo (yellow card) 45+2', (goal) 90+4'	Stadium: Coventry Building Society Arena; Attendance: 21,437; Referee: Dean Whitestone

28 February 2023 34	Preston North End	0–0	Coventry City	Preston
19:45 GMT	Lindsay (yellow card) 61'	Report	Doyle (yellow card) 47'; Eccles (yellow card) 78'; Hamer (yellow card) 90'; Gyökeres (yellow card) 90+5'	Stadium: Deepdale; Attendance: 13,891; Referee: John Busby

4 March 2023 35	Huddersfield Town	0–4	Coventry City	Huddersfield
15:00 GMT		Report	Howley (yellow card) 24'; Gyökeres 31', 59'; Hamer 55'; Walker 90+3'	Stadium: John Smith's Stadium; Attendance: 19,958; Referee: David Webb

11 March 2023 36	Coventry City	1–1	Hull City	Coventry
15:00 GMT	Godden 71'	Report	Estupiñán 52'	Stadium: Coventry Building Society Arena; Attendance: 22,206; Referee: Joshua Smith

14 March 2023 37	Wigan Athletic	1–1	Coventry City	Wigan
19:45 GMT	Darikwa (yellow card) 55'; McFadzean 83' (o.g.)	Report	Gyökeres 52'; Hamer (yellow card) 87'	Stadium: DW Stadium; Attendance: 11,014; Referee: Andy Woolmer

18 March 2023 38	Blackpool	1–4	Coventry City	Blackpool
15:00 GMT	Yates 35' (pen.)	Report	Gyökeres (yellow card) 14'; Sheaf 20'; McFadzean (yellow card) 34', (goal) 50'; Nelson 45+2' (o.g.); Godden 73'; Hamer (yellow card) 83'	Stadium: Bloomfield Road; Attendance: 14,055; Referee: Geoff Eltringham

1 April 2023 39	Coventry City	0–4	Stoke City	Coventry
15:00 GMT	Hamer (yellow card) 42'; Rose (yellow card) 57'	Report	Brown 6'; Campbell 40'; Smallbone 71'; Hoever 77'	Stadium: Coventry Building Society Arena; Attendance: 23,635; Referee: Sam Barrott

7 April 2023 40	Swansea City	0–0	Coventry City	Swansea
15:00 GMT	Darling (yellow card) 36'; Wood (yellow card) 76'	Report	McFadzean (yellow card) 36'; Gyökeres (yellow card) 87'; Dabo (yellow card) 90+1'	Stadium: Swansea.com Stadium; Attendance: 19,960; Referee: John Busby

10 April 2023 41	Coventry City	2–2	Watford	Coventry
15:00 GMT	McFadzean (yellow card) 14'; Eccles (yellow card) 45+3'; McNally (yellow card) 45+3'; Godden 58'; Sheaf 72'	Report	Pedro 6'; Choudhury (yellow card) 36'; Louza 45+1', (yellow card) 62'; Andrews (yellow card) 54'; Hoedt (yellow card) 88'	Stadium: Coventry Building Society Arena; Attendance: 21,112; Referee: Keith Stroud

15 April 2023 42	Queens Park Rangers	0–3	Coventry City	London
15:00 BST	Balogun (yellow card) 54'	Report	Gyökeres 10', 88'; McFadzean (yellow card) 34'; Eccles (yellow card) 45+3'; Doyle (yellow card) 52'; Hamer 86'	Stadium: Loftus Road Stadium; Attendance: 16,713 (2,964 away); Referee: Michael Salisbury

19 April 2023 43	Blackburn Rovers	1–1	Coventry City	Blackburn
19:45 GMT	Gallagher 39'; Travis (yellow card) 45+4'; Rankin-Costello (yellow card) 80'; Hedges (yellow card) 90+1'	Report	Doyle (yellow card) 90'; Wilson 90+5'	Stadium: Ewood Park; Attendance: 14,728; Referee: Jeremy Simpson

22 April 2023 44	Coventry City	2–1	Reading	Coventry
15:00 GMT	Godden 36'; Hamer 54' (yellow card) 81'; Wilson-Esbrand (yellow card) 61'; Eccles (yellow card) 87'; Norton-Cuffy (yellow card) 90+7'	Report	João 51'; Holmes (yellow card) 81'; Guinness-Walker (yellow card) 53'; Yiadom (yellow card) 56'; Fornah (yellow card) 90+7'	Stadium: Coventry Building Society Arena; Attendance: 23,694; Referee: Matthew Donohue

29 April 2023 45	Coventry City	2–0	Birmingham City	Coventry
15:00 GMT	Eccles 3'; Gyökeres 42' (pen.)	Report	Long (yellow card) 48'; Mejbri (yellow card) 90+5'	Stadium: Coventry Building Society Arena; Attendance: 30,175; Referee: James Linington

8 May 2023 46	Middlesbrough	1–1	Coventry City	Middlesbrough
15:00 GMT	Archer 45+4'; Jones (yellow card) 83'	Report	Hamer 22'; Kelly (yellow card) 26'; McFadzean (yellow card) 69'; Doyle (yellow card) 82'	Stadium: Riverside Stadium; Attendance: 32,187; Referee: John Busby

==== Play-offs ====
Coventry City finished 5th, in the regular season and were drawn against 4th place Middlesbrough.

14 May 2023 Semi final (1st leg)	Coventry City	0–0	Middlesbrough	Coventry
12:00 GMT		Report	Akpom (yellow card) 79'	Stadium: Coventry Building Society Arena; Attendance: 28,874; Referee: Bobby Madley

17 May 2023 Semi final (2nd leg)	Middlesbrough	0–1 (0–1 agg.)	Coventry City	Middlesbrough
20:00 GMT	Smith (yellow card) 16'; McNair (yellow card) 41'; Lenihan (yellow card) 69'; Jones (yellow card) 83'	Report	Doyle (yellow card) 34'; Hamer (yellow card) 45+3', (goal) 57'; McFadzean (yellow card) 61'; McNally (yellow card) 73'; Gyökeres (yellow card) 77'; Wilson (yellow card) 86'	Stadium: Riverside Stadium; Attendance: 32,154; Referee: David Coote

27 May 2023 Final	Coventry City	1–1 (a.e.t.) (5–6 p)	Luton Town	Wembley
16:45 GMT	McNally (yellow card) 46'; Hamer 66'	Report	Clark 23', (yellow card) 99'	Stadium: Wembley Stadium; Attendance: 85,711; Referee: Michael Oliver
	Penalties
	Godden (penalty scored); Gyökeres (penalty scored); Sheaf (penalty scored); Eccles (penalty scored); Kelly (penalty scored); Dabo (penalty missed)		(penalty scored) Morris; (penalty scored) Taylor; (penalty scored) Nakamba; (penalty scored) Clark; (penalty scored) Berry; (penalty scored) Potts

=== FA Cup ===
The Sky Blues entered the FA Cup in the third round and were drawn at home to Wrexham.

Win Draw Loss Fixtures

7 January 2023 Third round	Coventry City	3–4	Wrexham	Coventry
17:30 GMT	Sheaf 36'; Panzo (red card) 57'; Gyökeres 69'; Palmer 76'; Bidwell (yellow card) 83'; Rose (yellow card) 90+8'	Report	Dalby 12', (yellow card) 16'; Lee 18'; O'Connor 45+6'; Mullin (yellow card) 45+8', (goal) 58' (pen.); McAlinden (yellow card) 88'; Young (yellow card) 90+3'	Stadium: Coventry Building Society Arena; Attendance: 18,218; Referee: Tom Nield

=== EFL Cup ===
Win Draw Loss Fixtures

Coventry City were drawn at home to Bristol City in the first round. Due to an unplayable pitch at Coventry Building Society Arena the match was moved to Burton Albion's Pirelli Stadium.

10 August 2022 First round	Coventry City	1–4	Bristol City	Burton upon Trent
19:45 BST	Walker (yellow card) 34'; Allen 62'	Report	Vyner (yellow card) 1'; Naismith 12'; Conway 18', 30'; Weimann 90+4'	Stadium: Pirelli Stadium; Attendance: 2,680; Referee: Peter Wright

== Squad information ==
=== Squad details ===
No.	Name	Position	Nationality	Place of birth	Date of birth (age) *	Club apps *	Club goals *	Signed from	Date signed	Fee	Contract end
Goalkeepers
1	Simon Moore	GK	(England)	Sandown	19 May 1990 (aged 32)	42	0	Sheffield United	3 July 2021	Free	30 June 2024
13	Ben Wilson	GK	(England)	Stanley	9 August 1992 (aged 29)	42	0	Bradford City	1 July 2019	Free	30 June 2025
31	Tom Billson	GK	(England)	Leicester	18 October 2000 (aged 21)	1	0	Academy	1 July 2018	—N/a	30 June 2023
44	Cian Tyler	GK	(Wales) (England)	Coventry	22 March 2002 (aged 20)	0	0	Academy	10 November 2016	—N/a	30 June 2025
Defenders
2	Jonathan Panzo	CB	(England)	Brockley	25 October 2000 (aged 21)	0	0	Nottingham Forest	13 July 2022	Loan	30 June 2023
3	Callum Doyle	CB	(England)	Manchester	3 October 2003 (aged 18)	0	0	Manchester City	11 July 2022	Loan	30 June 2023
4	Michael Rose	CB	(Scotland)	Aberdeen	11 October 1995 (aged 26)	90	4	Ayr United	1 July 2019	Free	30 June 2023
5	Kyle McFadzean	CB	(England)	Sheffield	20 February 1987 (aged 35)	117	5	Burton Albion	1 July 2019	Free	30 June 2024
7	Brooke Norton-Cuffy	RB	(England)	Pimlico	12 January 2004 (aged 18)	0	0	Arsenal	6 January 2023	Loan	30 June 2023
11	Josh Wilson-Esbrand	LB	(England)	Hackney	26 December 2002 (aged 19)	0	0	Manchester City	10 January 2023	Loan	30 June 2023
16	Luke McNally	CB	(Republic of Ireland)	Enfield	20 September 1999 (aged 22)	0	0	Burnley	26 January 2023	Loan	30 June 2023
20	Todd Kane	RB	(England)	Huntingdon	17 September 1993 (aged 28)	31	1	Queens Park Rangers	31 August 2021	Undisclosed	30 June 2023
22	Josh Reid	LB	(Scotland)	Dingwall	3 May 2002 (aged 20)	1	0	Ross County	28 January 2021	Undisclosed	30 June 2024
23	Fankaty Dabo	RB	(England)	Southwark	11 October 1995 (aged 26)	100	0	Chelsea	1 July 2019	Free	30 June 2023
27	Jake Bidwell	LB	(England)	Southport	21 March 1993 (aged 29)	17	0	Swansea City	17 January 2022	Free	30 June 2025
29	Julien Dacosta	RB	(France)	Marseille	29 May 1996 (aged 26)	24	0	Chamois Niortais	6 July 2020	Free	30 June 2023
32	Jack Burroughs	RB	(Scotland) (England)	Coventry	21 March 2001 (aged 21)	6	0	Academy	7 August 2017	—N/a	30 June 2023
39	Abel Alabi	CB	(Republic of Ireland)		28 September 2003 (aged 18)	0	0	Waterford	1 January 2022	Undisclosed	30 June 2025
40	Dermi Lusala	RB	(England)	Edmonton	16 January 2003 (aged 19)	0	0	Tottenham Hotspur	1 July 2022	Free	30 June 2024
46	Blaine Rowe	RB	(England)	Coventry	22 March 2002 (aged 20)	0	0	Academy	1 July 2019	—N/a	30 June 2023
50	Jay McGrath	CB	(Republic of Ireland) (England)	Doncaster	15 April 2003 (aged 19)	0	0	Mickleover	17 July 2020	Undisclosed	30 June 2023
Midfielders
6	Liam Kelly	DM	(Scotland) (England)	Newport Pagnell	10 February 1990 (aged 32)	147	3	Leyton Orient	1 July 2017	Free	30 June 2023
8	Jamie Allen	CM	(England)	Rochdale	29 January 1995 (aged 27)	80	3	Burton Albion	1 July 2019	Undisclosed	30 June 2025
10	Callum O'Hare	AM	(England)	Solihull	1 May 1998 (aged 24)	135	12	Aston Villa	15 July 2020	Free	30 June 2024
14	Ben Sheaf	DM	(England)	Dartford	5 February 1998 (aged 24)	69	2	Arsenal	1 July 2021	Undisclosed	30 June 2026
28	Josh Eccles	CM	(England)	Coventry	6 April 2000 (aged 22)	28	0	Academy	14 August 2016	—N/a	30 June 2027
34	Ricardo Dinanga	LW	(Republic of Ireland)	Cork	6 December 2001 (aged 20)	0	0	Cork City	9 July 2021	Compensation	30 June 2023
36	Ryan Howley	CM	(Wales) (England)	Nuneaton	23 November 2003 (aged 18)	2	0	Academy	1 July 2021	—N/a	30 June 2023
38	Gustavo Hamer	CM	(Netherlands) (Brazil)	Itajaí	24 June 1997 (aged 25)	85	8	PEC Zwolle	3 July 2020	£1,350,000	30 June 2024
43	Marco Rus	MF	(Romania) (England)	Florești	23 January 2003 (aged 19)	0	0	Southampton	17 July 2021	Free	30 June 2023
45	Kasey Palmer	AM	(Jamaica) (England)	Lewisham	9 November 1996 (aged 25)	0	0	Bristol City	21 June 2022	Undisclosed	30 June 2025
49	Aidan Finnegan	CM	(England)	Birmingham	18 February 2003 (aged 19)	0	0	Birmingham City	5 October 2020	Free	30 June 2023
Forwards
9	Martyn Waghorn	CF	(England)	South Shields	23 January 1990 (aged 32)	29	1	Derby County	2 July 2021	Free	30 June 2023
17	Viktor Gyökeres	CF	(Sweden)	Bromölla	4 June 1998 (aged 24)	66	21	Brighton & Hove Albion	9 July 2021	Undisclosed	30 June 2024
18	Sean Maguire	CF	(Republic of Ireland) (England)	Luton	1 May 1994 (aged 28)	0	0	Preston North End	26 January 2023	Free	30 June 2023
19	Tyler Walker	CF	(England)	Nottingham	17 October 1996 (aged 25)	53	11	Nottingham Forest	28 August 2020	Undisclosed	30 June 2023
24	Matt Godden	CF	(England)	Canterbury	29 July 1991 (aged 30)	82	33	Peterborough United	6 August 2019	Undisclosed	30 June 2024
30	Fábio Tavares	FW	(Portugal) (England)	Porto	22 January 2001 (aged 21)	7	1	Rochdale	1 February 2021	Undisclosed	30 June 2025
35	Danny Cashman	FW	(England)	Crawley	8 January 2001 (aged 21)	0	0	Brighton & Hove Albion	6 August 2021	Free	30 June 2024
37	Tom Costello	CF	(England)		23 February 2003 (aged 19)	0	0	Wigan Athletic	1 July 2022	Free	30 June 2024
41	Will Bapaga	LW	(England)	Coventry	3 November 2002 (aged 19)	8	0	Academy	3 August 2019	—N/a	30 June 2023
47	Harrison Nee	CF	(England)		2 July 2003 (aged 18)	0	0	Academy	1 July 2022	—N/a	30 June 2023
Left before the end of the season
11	Tayo Adaramola	LB	(Republic of Ireland)	Dublin	12 November 2003 (aged 18)	0	0	Crystal Palace	27 July 2022	Loan	30 June 2023
15	Dominic Hyam	CB	(Scotland) (England)	Leuchars	20 December 1995 (aged 26)	190	9	Reading	1 July 2017	Free	30 June 2024
	Marcel Hilßner	RW	(Germany)	Leipzig	30 January 1995 (aged 27)	0	0	SC Paderborn	16 July 2020	Undisclosed	30 June 2023

* Player age and appearances/goals for the club as of beginning of 2022–23 season.

=== Appearances ===
Correct as of match played on 27 May 2023

No.	Nat.	Player	Pos.	Championship	FA Cup	EFL Cup	Championship Play-offs	Total
1	(England)	Simon Moore	GK	3	1			4
2	(England)	Jonathan Panzo	DF	24+5	1		0+2	32
3	(England)	Callum Doyle	DF	39+2	0+1	1	3	46
4	(Scotland)	Michael Rose	DF	18+6	1	1		26
5	(England)	Kyle McFadzean	DF	34+1		1	3	39
6	(Scotland)	Liam Kelly	MF	3+7	1		3	14
7	(England)	Brooke Norton-Cuffy	DF	14+7			3	24
8	(England)	Jamie Allen	MF	34+3	0+1	1	2+1	42
9	(England)	Martyn Waghorn	FW	3+8	1	0+1		13
10	(England)	Callum O'Hare	MF	8+3				11
11	(England)	Josh Wilson-Esbrand	DF	4+9				13
13	(England)	Ben Wilson	GK	43		1	3	47
14	(England)	Ben Sheaf	MF	33+2	1		2	38
16	(Republic of Ireland)	Luke McNally	DF	19			3	22
17	(Sweden)	Viktor Gyökeres	FW	44+2	0+1		3	50
18	(Republic of Ireland)	Sean Maguire	FW	1+6				7
19	(England)	Tyler Walker	FW	3+15		1		19
20	(England)	Todd Kane	DF	2+7	0+1			10
22	(Scotland)	Josh Reid	DF					
23	(England)	Fankaty Dabo	DF	20+7	1	1	0+2	31
24	(England)	Matt Godden	FW	22+8			1+2	33
27	(England)	Jake Bidwell	DF	40+5	1	0+1	3	50
28	(England)	Josh Eccles	MF	27+7		1	1+2	38
29	(France)	Julien Dacosta	DF					
30	(Portugal)	Fábio Tavares	FW	0+9	1	1		11
31	(England)	Tom Billson	GK					
32	(Scotland)	Jack Burroughs	DF	5+7	1	0+1		14
34	(Republic of Ireland)	Ricardo Dinanga	MF					
35	(England)	Danny Cashman	FW					
36	(Wales)	Ryan Howley	MF	2+2		0+1		5
37	(England)	Tom Costello	FW					
38	(Netherlands)	Gustavo Hamer	MF	39+2	0+1		3	45
39	(Republic of Ireland)	Abel Alabi	DF					
40	(England)	Dermi Lusala	DF					
41	(England)	Will Bapaga	FW					
43	(Romania)	Marco Rus	MF					
44	(Wales)	Cian Tyler	GK					
45	(Jamaica)	Kasey Palmer	MF	19+10	1	1	0+1	32
46	(England)	Blaine Rowe	DF					
47	(England)	Harrison Nee	FW					
49	(England)	Aidan Finnegan	MF					
50	(Republic of Ireland)	Jay McGrath	DF					
Left before the end of the season
11	(Republic of Ireland)	Tayo Adaramola	DF			1		1
15	(Scotland)	Dominic Hyam	DF	2				2
	(Germany)	Marcel Hilßner	MF					

=== Goalscorers ===
Correct as of match played on 27 May 2023

No.	Nat.	Player	Pos.	Championship	FA Cup	EFL Cup	Championship Play-offs	Total
17	(Sweden)	Viktor Gyökeres	FW	21	1	0	0	22
38	(Netherlands)	Gustavo Hamer	MF	9	0	0	2	11
24	(England)	Matt Godden	FW	8	0	0	0	8
8	(England)	Jamie Allen	MF	6	0	1	0	7
45	(Jamaica)	Kasey Palmer	MF	3	1	0	0	4
14	(England)	Ben Sheaf	MF	2	1	0	0	3
5	(England)	Kyle McFadzean	DF	2	0	0	0	2
2	(England)	Jonathan Panzo	DF	1	0	0	0	1
9	(England)	Martyn Waghorn	FW	1	0	0	0	1
13	(England)	Ben Wilson	GK	1	0	0	0	1
19	(England)	Tyler Walker	FW	1	0	0	0	1
27	(England)	Jake Bidwell	DF	1	0	0	0	1
28	(England)	Josh Eccles	MF	1	0	0	0	1
Own Goals				1	0	0	0	1
Totals				58	3	1	2	64

=== Yellow cards ===
Correct as of match played on 27 May 2023

No.	Nat.	Player	Pos.	Championship	FA Cup	EFL Cup	Championship Play-offs	Total
5	(England)	Kyle McFadzean	FW	11	0	0	1	12
14	(England)	Ben Sheaf	MF	9	0	0	0	9
3	(England)	Callum Doyle	DF	7	0	0	1	8
17	(Sweden)	Viktor Gyökeres	FW	7	0	0	1	8
28	(England)	Josh Eccles	MF	8	0	0	0	8
38	(Netherlands)	Gustavo Hamer	MF	7	0	0	1	8
2	(England)	Jonathan Panzo	DF	7	0	0	0	7
27	(England)	Jake Bidwell	DF	6	1	0	0	7
13	(England)	Ben Wilson	GK	5	0	0	1	6
23	(England)	Fankaty Dabo	DF	6	0	0	0	6
45	(Jamaica)	Kasey Palmer	MF	5	0	0	0	5
7	(England)	Brooke Norton-Cuffy	DF	4	0	0	0	4
4	(Scotland)	Michael Rose	DF	2	1	0	0	3
16	(Republic of Ireland)	Luke McNally	DF	1	0	0	2	3
8	(England)	Jamie Allen	MF	2	0	0	0	2
6	(Scotland)	Liam Kelly	MF	1	0	0	0	1
11	(England)	Josh Wilson-Esbrand	DF	1	0	0	0	1
19	(England)	Tyler Walker	FW	0	0	1	0	1
32	(Scotland)	Jack Burroughs	DF	1	0	0	0	1
36	(Wales)	Ryan Howley	MF	1	0	0	0	1
Totals				91	2	1	7	101

=== Red cards ===
Correct as of match played on 11 February 2023

No.	Nat.	Player	Pos.	Championship	FA Cup	EFL Cup	Championship Play-offs	Total
38	(Netherlands)	Gustavo Hamer	MF	2	0	0	0	2
2	(England)	Jonathan Panzo	DF	0	1	0	0	1
11	(England)	Josh Wilson-Esbrand	DF	1	0	0	0	1
Totals				3	1	0	0	4

=== Captains ===
Correct as of match played on 27 May 2023

No.	Nat.	Player	Pos.	Championship	FA Cup	EFL Cup	Championship Play-offs	Total
5	(England)	Kyle McFadzean	DF	32	0	1	0	33
8	(England)	Jamie Allen	MF	11	0	0	0	11
6	(Scotland)	Liam Kelly	MF	3	1	0	3	7
Totals				46	1	1	3	51

=== Penalties awarded ===
No.	Nat.	Player	Pos.	Date	Opponents	Ground	Success
24	(England)	Matt Godden	FW	27 August 2022	Hull City	MKM Stadium	✓
9	(England)	Martyn Waghorn	FW	19 October 2022	Sheffield United	Coventry Building Society Arena	✓
17	(Sweden)	Viktor Gyökeres	FW	25 October 2022	Rotherham United	Coventry Building Society Arena	✓
17	(Sweden)	Viktor Gyökeres	FW	21 December 2022	West Bromwich Albion	Coventry Building Society Arena	✓
17	(Sweden)	Viktor Gyökeres	FW	26 December 2022	Sheffield United	Bramall Lane	✗
24	(England)	Matt Godden	FW	11 February 2023	Luton Town	Coventry Building Society Arena	✓
17	(Sweden)	Viktor Gyökeres	FW	29 April 2023	Birmingham City	Coventry Building Society Arena	✓

=== Suspensions served ===
No.	Nat.	Player	Pos.	Date suspended	Reason	Matches missed
38	(Netherlands)	Gustavo Hamer	MF	13 August 2022	1 red card	Hull City (A)
38	(Netherlands)	Gustavo Hamer	MF	17 September 2022	1 red card	Middlesbrough (H); Bristol City (A); Burnley (H); Cardiff City (A)
14	(England)	Ben Sheaf	MF	19 October 2022	5 yellow cards	Stoke City (A)
5	(England)	Kyle McFadzean	DF	12 November 2022	5 yellow cards	Reading (A)
2	(England)	Jonathan Panzo	DF	7 January 2023	1 red card	Burnley (A)
11	(England)	Josh Wilson-Esbrand	DF	11 February 2023	1 red card	Millwall (H)

=== Monthly & weekly awards ===
No.	Nat.	Player	Pos.	Date	Award	Ref
5	(England)	Kyle McFadzean	DF	24 October 2022	EFL Championship Team of the Week	
38	(Netherlands)	Gustavo Hamer	MF	24 October 2022	EFL Championship Team of the Week	
14	(England)	Ben Sheaf	MF	3 November 2022	EFL Championship Team of the Week	
17	(Sweden)	Viktor Gyökeres	FW	7 November 2022	EFL Championship Team of the Week	
17	(Sweden)	Viktor Gyökeres	FW	14 November 2022	EFL Championship Team of the Week	
28	(England)	Josh Eccles	MF	14 November 2022	EFL Championship Team of the Week	
	(England)	Mark Robins		9 December 2022	EFL Championship Manager of the Month	
17	(Sweden)	Viktor Gyökeres	FW	9 December 2022	EFL Championship Player of the Month	
17	(Sweden)	Viktor Gyökeres	FW	20 December 2022	EFL Championship Team of the Week	
2	(England)	Jonathan Panzo	DF	29 January 2023	EFL Team of the Week	
16	(Republic of Ireland)	Luke McNally	DF	29 January 2023	EFL Team of the Week	
13	(England)	Ben Wilson	GK	12 February 2023	EFL Championship Team of the Week	
16	(Republic of Ireland)	Luke McNally	DF	12 February 2023	EFL Championship Team of the Week	
16	(Republic of Ireland)	Luke McNally	DF	16 February 2023	EFL Championship Team of the Week	
17	(Sweden)	Viktor Gyökeres	FW	28 February 2023	EFL Championship Team of the Week	
16	(Republic of Ireland)	Luke McNally	DF	5 March 2023	EFL Championship Team of the Week	
17	(Sweden)	Viktor Gyökeres	FW	5 March 2023	EFL Championship Team of the Week	
38	(Netherlands)	Gustavo Hamer	MF	5 March 2023	EFL Championship Team of the Week	
17	(Sweden)	Viktor Gyökeres	FW	16 March 2023	EFL Championship Team of the Week	
5	(England)	Kyle McFadzean	DF	20 March 2023	EFL Championship Team of the Week	
14	(England)	Ben Sheaf	MF	20 March 2023	EFL Championship Team of the Week	
17	(Sweden)	Viktor Gyökeres	FW	7 April 2023	EFL Championship Player of the Month	
13	(England)	Ben Wilson	GK	8 April 2023	EFL Championship Team of the Week	
14	(England)	Ben Sheaf	MF	11 April 2023	EFL Championship Team of the Week	
17	(Sweden)	Viktor Gyökeres	FW	17 April 2023	EFL Championship Team of the Week	
38	(Netherlands)	Gustavo Hamer	MF	17 April 2023	EFL Championship Team of the Week	
38	(Netherlands)	Gustavo Hamer	MF	20 April 2023	EFL Championship Team of the Week	
38	(Netherlands)	Gustavo Hamer	MF	25 April 2023	EFL Championship Team of the Week	
17	(Sweden)	Viktor Gyökeres	FW	2 May 2023	EFL Championship Team of the Week	
38	(Netherlands)	Gustavo Hamer	MF	5 May 2023	EFL Championship Player of the Month	

=== End-of-season awards ===
No.	Nat.	Player	Pos.	Date	Award	Ref
13	(England)	Ben Wilson	GK	23 April 2023	EFL Awards Team of the Season	
17	(Sweden)	Viktor Gyökeres	FW	23 April 2023	EFL Awards Team of the Season	
17	(Sweden)	Viktor Gyökeres	FW	30 April 2023	CCFC Top Goalscorer	
17	(Sweden)	Viktor Gyökeres	FW	30 April 2023	CCFC Family Zone Player of the Year	
3	(England)	Callum Doyle	DF	30 April 2023	CCFC Young Player of the Season	
43	(Romania)	Marco Rus	MF	30 April 2023	CCFC Development Player of the Year	
5	(England)	Kyle McFadzean	DF	30 April 2023	CCFC Community Player of the Year	
5	(England)	Kyle McFadzean	DF	30 April 2023	PFA Community Champion of the Season	
	(England)	Mike Reid		30 April 2023	CCFC Michelle Ridley Award	
17	(Sweden)	Viktor Gyökeres	FW	30 April 2023	CCFC JSB Player of the Year	
38	(Netherlands)	Gustavo Hamer	MF	30 April 2023	CCFC Goal of the Season	
17	(Sweden)	Viktor Gyökeres	FW	30 April 2023	CCFC Players' Player of the Season	
13	(England)	Ben Wilson	GK	30 April 2023	CCFC Special Recognition Award	
38	(Netherlands)	Gustavo Hamer	MF	30 April 2023	CCFC Player of the Season	
13	(England)	Ben Wilson	GK	8 May 2023	EFL Championship Golden Glove	
17	(Sweden)	Viktor Gyökeres	FW	29 August 2023	PFA Championship Team of the Year	

== Transfers ==
=== Transfers in ===
Date	Position	Nationality	Name	From	Fee	Ref.
21 June 2022	AM	(Jamaica)	Kasey Palmer	(England) Bristol City	Undisclosed	
1 July 2022	CF	(England)	Tom Costello	(England) Wigan Athletic	Free Transfer	
1 July 2022	RB	(England)	Dermi Lusala	(England) Tottenham Hotspur	Free Transfer	
26 January 2023	CB	(Italy)	Riccardo Di Trolio	(England) St Albans City	Free Transfer	
26 January 2023	CF	(Republic of Ireland)	Sean Maguire	(England) Preston North End	Free Transfer	

=== Loans in ===
Date from	Position	Nationality	Name	From	Date until	Ref.
11 July 2022	CB	(England)	Callum Doyle	(England) Manchester City	End of season	
13 July 2022	CB	(England)	Jonathan Panzo	(England) Nottingham Forest	End of season	
27 July 2022	LB	(Republic of Ireland)	Tayo Adaramola	(England) Crystal Palace	2 September 2022	(Note: On 2 September, Adaramola was recalled back to Crystal Palace, originally intended to be a season-long loan.)
6 January 2023	RB	(England)	Brooke Norton-Cuffy	(England) Arsenal	End of season	
10 January 2023	LB	(England)	Josh Wilson-Esbrand	(England) Manchester City	End of season	
26 January 2023	CB	(Republic of Ireland)	Luke McNally	(England) Burnley	End of Season	

=== Loans out ===
Date from	Position	Nationality	Name	To	Date until	Ref.
27 June 2022	RB	(France)	Julien Dacosta	(England) Shrewsbury Town	31 January 2023 (Note: On 31 January, Dacosta was recalled back from his loan at Shrewsbury Town)	
1 September 2022	FW	(England)	Danny Cashman	(England) Walsall	16 January 2023 (Note: On 16 January, Cashman was recalled back from his loan at Walsall)	
2 September 2022	DF	(Scotland)	George Burroughs	(England) Telford United	1 January 2023 (Note: On 25 November, Burroughs' loan stay at Telford was extended until January.)	
2 September 2022	GK	(Wales)	Cian Tyler	(England) Hereford	10 November 2022 (Note: On 10 October, Tyler's loan at Hereford was extended by a further month.)	
7 October 2022	GK	(England)	Luke Bell	(England) Stratford Town	7 November 2022	
14 November 2022	GK	(England)	Tom Billson	(England) Kidderminster Harriers	14 December 2022	
18 November 2022	CB	(Republic of Ireland)	Jay McGrath	(England) Alfreton Town	16 December 2022	
24 November 2022	GK	(England)	Luke Bell	(England) Slimbridge	24 December 2022	
25 November 2022	CB	(Republic of Ireland)	Adel Alabi	(England) Tamworth	1 January 2023	
25 November 2022	RB	(England)	Dermi Lusala	(England) Barwell	1 January 2023	
25 November 2022	CF	(England)	Harrison Nee	(England) Barwell	1 January 2023	
26 November 2022	LW	(Republic of Ireland)	Ricardo Dinanga	(England) Hereford	1 January 2023	
3 December 2022	MF	(Romania)	Marco Rus	(England) Hereford	1 January 2023	
2 January 2023	RB	(England)	Blaine Rowe	(Scotland) Falkirk	End of season	
12 January 2023	RB	(England)	Todd Kane	(England) Charlton Athletic	End of season	
13 January 2023	CF	(England)	Martyn Waghorn	(England) Huddersfield Town	End of season	
26 January 2023	CB	(Italy)	Riccardo Di Trolio	(England) St Albans City	End of season	
31 January 2023	FW	(England)	Danny Cashman	(England) Altrincham	22 March 2023	
31 January 2023	RB	(France)	Julien Dacosta	(France) AS Nancy	End of season	
31 January 2023	LB	(Scotland)	Josh Reid	(England) Stevenage	End of season	
10 February 2023	CB	(Republic of Ireland)	Adel Alabi	(England) Alvechurch	10 March 2023	
14 February 2023	CB	(Republic of Ireland)	Jay McGrath	(Republic of Ireland) St Patrick's Athletic	End of season	
10 March 2023	CF	(England)	Tom Costello	(England) Banbury United	End of Season	
23 March 2023	CB	(Republic of Ireland)	Adel Alabi	(England) Alvechurch	End of Season	
23 March 2023	LW	(Republic of Ireland)	Ricardo Dinanga	(England) Nuneaton Borough	End of Season	
23 March 2023	CM	(England)	Aidan Finnegan	(England) Alvechurch	End of Season	
23 March 2023	MF	(Romania)	Marco Rus	(England) Chorley	End of Season	
25 March 2023	GK	(England)	Tom Billson	(England) Scunthorpe United	End of Season	

=== Transfers out ===
Date	Position	Nationality	Name	To	Fee	Ref.
10 June 2022 (Note: The transfer was announced on 7 June, and would become official on June 10 once the transfer window opened)	CB	(England)	Declan Drysdale	(Wales) Newport County	Undisclosed	
10 June 2022 (Note: The transfer was announced on 11 May, and would become official on June 10 once the transfer window opened)	CM	(Republic of Ireland)	Jordan Shipley	(England) Shrewsbury Town	Undisclosed	
30 June 2022	AM	(Wales)	Aaron Evans-Harriott	(England) Evesham United	Released	
30 June 2022	RW	(England)	Jodi Jones	(England) Oxford United	Released	
30 June 2022	CM	(England)	Reece Massey	(England) Brackley Town	Released	
30 June 2022	AM	(England)	Jonny Ngandu	(Scotland) Hamilton Academical	Released	
30 June 2022	CB	(England)	Josh Pask	(Wales) The New Saints	Released	
30 June 2022	RB	(England)	Byron Wilson	(England) Brentford	Released	
28 August 2022	CB	(Scotland)	Dominic Hyam	(England) Blackburn Rovers	Undisclosed	
31 January 2023	RW	(Germany)	Marcel Hilßner	(Germany) Werder Bremen II	Mutual Consent	
