= Fankaty Dabo =

English footballer (born 1995)

Personal information
- Full name: Sheikh Mohamed Fankaty Dabo
- Date of birth: 11 October 1995 (age 31)
- Place of birth: Southwark, England
- Height: 5 ft 11 in (1.81 m)
- Position: Right-back

Youth career
- 2007–2016: Chelsea

Senior career*
| Years | Team | Apps | (Gls) |
| 2016–2019 | Chelsea | 0 | (0) |
| 2017 | → Swindon Town (loan) | 15 | (1) |
| 2017–2018 | → Vitesse (loan) | 26 | (0) |
| 2018–2019 | → Sparta Rotterdam (loan) | 21 | (0) |
| 2019–2023 | Coventry City | 116 | (0) |
| 2023–2024 | Forest Green Rovers | 31 | (0) |
| 2024–2025 | Raith Rovers | 9 | (0) |
| Total | | 218 | (1) |

International career
| 2011 | England U16 | 5 | (0) |
| 2011 | England U17 | 5 | (0) |
| 2014 | England U20 | 1 | (0) |
- * Club domestic league appearances and goals

Sheikh Mohamed Fankaty Dabo (born 11 October 1995) is an English former professional footballer who played as a right-back.

== Club career ==
Dabo began his career with Chelsea. On 11 January 2017, along with Chelsea teammates Charlie Colkett and Islam Feruz, Dabo joined League One side Swindon Town on loan for the remainder of the 2016–17 season. Three days later, Dabo made his debut in a 2–1 away victory against Bolton Wanderers, featuring for the entire 90 minutes. On 5 February 2017, Dabo scored his first goal for Swindon in their local derby against Oxford United.

On 25 June 2017, Dabo joined Dutch side Vitesse on a season-long loan. In August 2018 Dabo returned on loan to the Netherlands, this time with Sparta Rotterdam.

On 5 June 2019, it was announced that Dabo would join Coventry City on a three-year deal after his Chelsea contract expired on 1 July. Dabo won Coventry's 2019–20 'Player of the Year' award.

On 27 May 2023, he missed the final penalty for Coventry City in a 6–5 defeat in the penalty shootouts against Luton Town in the EFL Championship play-off final. Following that match, he received racist abuse, and was among the players who were released by the club by the end of the season.

On 1 September 2023, Dabo joined EFL League Two club Forest Green Rovers. In January 2024 Dabo was publicly criticised by manager Troy Deeney, who was himself criticised by some for speaking publicly. He was released following relegation at the end of the 2023–24 season.

On 23 September 2024, Dabo joined Scottish Championship club Raith Rovers on a short-term deal. He left the club in January 2025. He retired from professional football in January 2026.

== International career ==
Dabo was born in England and is of Sierra Leonean descent. He has represented England at under-16, under-17 and under-20 youth levels.

== Personal life ==
Dabo is a devout Muslim, and as of September 2024 was married with a son.

== Career statistics ==
Appearances and goals by club, season and competition
| Club | Season | League | | | National Cup | | League Cup | | Other | | Total | |
| Club | Season | Division | Apps | Goals | Apps | Goals | Apps | Goals | Apps | Goals | Apps | Goals |
|---|---|---|---|---|---|---|---|---|---|---|---|---|
| Chelsea | 2016–17 | Premier League | 0 | 0 | 0 | 0 | 0 | 0 | 0 | 0 | 0 | 0 |
| Chelsea | 2017–18 | Premier League | 0 | 0 | 0 | 0 | 0 | 0 | 0 | 0 | 0 | 0 |
| Chelsea | 2018–19 | Premier League | 0 | 0 | 0 | 0 | 0 | 0 | 0 | 0 | 0 | 0 |
| Chelsea | Total | | 0 | 0 | 0 | 0 | 0 | 0 | 0 | 0 | 0 | 0 |
| Swindon Town (loan) | 2016–17 | League One | 15 | 1 | 0 | 0 | 0 | 0 | 0 | 0 | 15 | 1 |
| Vitesse (loan) | 2017–18 | Eredivisie | 26 | 0 | 1 | 0 | — | | 7 (Note: Five appearances in UEFA Europa League; one appearance in Johan Cruyff Shield; one appearance in Eredivisie European play-offs.) | 0 | 34 | 0 |
| Sparta Rotterdam (loan) | 2018–19 | Eerste Divisie | 21 | 0 | 1 | 0 | — | | 4 (Note: Appearances in Eerste Divisie promotion play-offs.) | 0 | 26 | 0 |
| Coventry City | 2019–20 | League One | 32 | 0 | 6 | 0 | 2 | 0 | 1 (Note: Appearance in EFL Trophy) | 0 | 41 | 0 |
| Coventry City | 2020–21 | Championship | 28 | 0 | 0 | 0 | 1 | 0 | — | | 29 | 0 |
| Coventry City | 2021–22 | Championship | 29 | 0 | 1 | 0 | 0 | 0 | — | | 30 | 0 |
| Coventry City | 2022–23 | Championship | 27 | 0 | 1 | 0 | 1 | 0 | 2 (Note: Appearances in the 2023 English Football League play-offs) | 0 | 31 | 0 |
| Coventry City | Total | | 116 | 0 | 8 | 0 | 4 | 0 | 2 | 0 | 131 | 0 |
| Forest Green Rovers | 2023–24 | League Two | 31 | 0 | 2 | 0 | 0 | 0 | 2 (Note: Appearance in EFL Trophy) | 0 | 35 | 0 |
| Raith Rovers | 2024–25 | Scottish Championship | 9 | 0 | 1 | 0 | 0 | 0 | 0 | 0 | 10 | 0 |
| Career total | | | 218 | 1 | 13 | 0 | 4 | 0 | 16 | 0 | 251 | 1 |

== Honours ==
Coventry City

- EFL League One: 2019–20

Individual

- PFA Team of the Year: 2019–20 League One
- Coventry City Player of the Season: 2019–20
