= Oldmachar Academy =

Location
- Jesmond Drive; Bridge of Don, Aberdeen, AB22 8UR; Scotland

Information
- Type: Secondary School
- Motto: No fish we can't catch, No tower we can't climb, No river we can't cross
- Established: August 1982
- Local authority: Aberdeen City Council
- Staff: 40+
- Gender: Co-educational
- Age: 11 to 18
- Capacity: 1104
- Houses: Auchindoun, Crathes, Esslemont, Fyvie
- Colours: Purple, blue and silver
- Website: Oldmachar Academy

Oldmachar Academy is situated in Bridge of Don in the north of Aberdeen in an area of private housing. It is a six-year comprehensive, non-denominational school which opened to pupils in August 1982 (April 1983 on its present site). In 2004 it was ranked in the top 50 Secondary Schools in Scotland.

== Overview ==
The school consists of seven blocks built to form an irregular quadrangle, with playing fields to the north of the school. The school buildings have often been a target for vandals, with 140 incidents recorded between 2016 and 2019.

The school receives Primary 7 pupils from the 5 associated Primary schools in its 'Associate Schools Group'. These schools are:

- Danestone Primary School
- Forehill Primary School
- Glashieburn Primary School
- Greenbrae Primary School
- Middleton Park School

The current head teacher is Joanne Hesford, who took over in 2022 from Judith Mohammed.

The school has a capacity of 1,104 pupils. The school roll has gradually fallen over the years, with figures from Aberdeen City Council listing a roll of 852 in 2012, dropping to 656 in 2018, before being forecast to rise slightly in 2020.

The school has a tradition of promoting healthy eating among its pupils, including limiting the amount of fried food available in the canteen. The then-Rector Joseph Leiper took part in a Scotland-wide inquiry into healthy eating in schools in 2004. He was made an OBE for services to education in that year's New Year's Honours list.

== Houses ==
As of 2009, there are seven classes in each year group (A to G) except S1 which has six classes. There are four school houses, each named after a local Scottish castle beginning with the letter of the six corresponding classes. "G" does not have its own house due to there not being enough pupils and the absence of a first year "G" class, so they are split into the other houses by year.

The houses are:

- Auchindoun (1A–6A)
- Crathes (1C–6C)
- Esslemont (1E–6E)
- Fyvie (1F–6F)

== Head teachers ==
Name	Incumbency
Joanne Hesford	2022–Present
Judith Mohammed	2014-2022
Derek Brown	2009–2014
James Dalgarno	2004–2009
Joseph Leiper OBE	1984–2004
Campbell Westwood	1982-1984

== Notable former pupils ==
- Scott Booth, footballer
- Neil Fachie, cyclist
- Norman Macleod, journalist and news presenter (attended Oldmachar for two years)
- Scott Michie, footballer
- Gavin Rae, footballer
- Dennis Wyness, footballer
- Michael Rose, footballer
