= Luke McNally =

Irish footballer (born 1999)

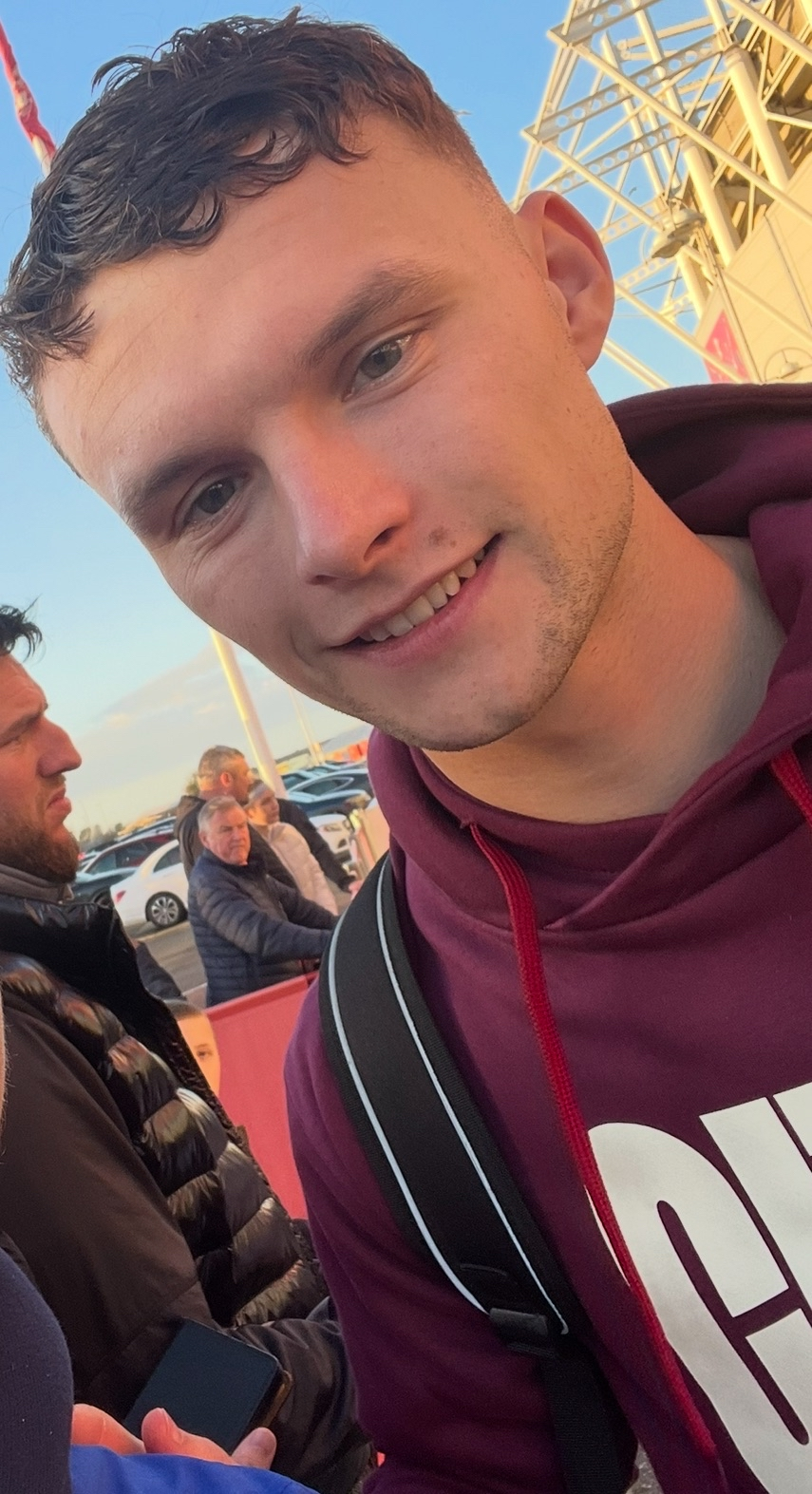
- Luke McNally in 2024.

Personal information
- Full name: Luke McNally
- Date of birth: 20 September 1999 (age 27)
- Place of birth: Enfield, Ireland
- Height: 1.93 m (6 ft 4 in)
- Position: Centre back

Team information
- Current team: Bristol City
- Number: 15

Youth career
- 2005–2015: Enfield Celtic
- 2015–2017: Drogheda United
- 2017–2018: St Patrick's Athletic

Senior career*
Years	Team	Apps	(Gls)
2017–2021	St Patrick's Athletic	18	(1)
2019	→ Drogheda United (loan)	27	(6)
2021–2022	Oxford United	30	(4)
2022–2024	Burnley	4	(0)
2023	→ Coventry City (loan)	19	(0)
2023–2024	→ Stoke City (loan)	38	(2)
2024–	Bristol City	31	(3)

International career
2017	Republic of Ireland U19	1	(0)
- * Club domestic league appearances and goals as of 17:23, 5 November 2026 (UTC)

Luke McNally (born 20 September 1999) is an Irish professional footballer who plays as a centre back for EFL Championship club Bristol City.

== Club career ==
=== Early career ===
Raised in Enfield, County Meath, McNally played for his local club Enfield Celtic before signing for his local League of Ireland club Drogheda United in August 2015. He played for the club's under 17 side for their 2015 and 2016 seasons before moving to Dublin club St Patrick's Athletic in March 2017, playing with their under 19 side. He played in the same Under 19s team as fellow future first-team players including Jake Walker, Brian Maher, Paul Clearly and Joe Manley. In 2018, his side got to the Enda McGuill Cup final, ultimately losing out 2–1 to Bohemians at Richmond Park on 4 September.

=== St Patrick's Athletic ===
McNally's first involvement in a first-team squad was on 8 August 2017, when he was named on the bench for a Leinster Senior Cup game against Firhouse Clover, remaining an unused substitute. On 8 February 2019, it was announced that McNally had signed a two-year professional contract with St Patrick's Athletic, while he would be loaned to Drogheda United for the 2019 League of Ireland First Division season.

==== Drogheda United loan ====
McNally's first appearance in a Drogheda United shirt came on 8 February 2019, playing in a friendly against his parent club St Patrick's Athletic on the same day that he signed for the club on loan. His competitive debut in senior football came on the opening night of the League of Ireland First Division season, as his side beat Cobh Ramblers 4–0 at United Park. The first senior goal of McNally's career also came against Cobh Ramblers, when he scored the 4th goal in a 4–1 away win at St Colman's Park on 27 April 2019. The month of May saw him score twice, scoring the 4th goal in a 5–0 win over Cabinteely at Stradbrook Road on the 18th, before scoring an equaliser in a 2–1 win away to Wexford at Ferrycarrig Park. On 28 June 2019, McNally scored an injury time header to beat Bray Wanderers by a goal to nil at United Park. McNally then scored in a 3–1 win over Galway United in August as well as scoring an equaliser against Shelbourne in a title-deciding match which his side lost 3–1 to finish runners up to Shels in second place. Drogheda United's second-place finish did, however, earn them a place in the League of Ireland promotion/relegation playoffs. They faced Cabinteely in the semi-final and lost the first leg 1–0 before beating them 5–1 in the second leg with McNally scoring a perfect hat-trick from centre back. Despite winning the first leg of the Playoff Final 1–0 at home to Premier Division side Finn Harps, McNally and Drogheda were beaten 2–0 at Finn Park in the second leg, denying them a place in the 2020 League of Ireland Premier Division. McNally finished his first full season with 37 appearances in all competitions, scoring 9 goals despite his defensive role in the team. At the club's end of season awards night, he was named as Drogheda United Young Player of the Year for 2019.

==== Return from loan ====
New Pat's manager Stephen O'Donnell decided to keep McNally on after an impressive season with Drogheda United, with McNally returning to Pat's first-team training for pre-season on 2 December 2019 ahead of the 2020 season. McNally signed a new two-year contract with the club on 27 January 2020. He made his senior debut for the club in the opening game of the season on 14 February 2020, a 1–0 loss to Waterford at Richmond Park. The season was halted after just 4 games due to the Coronavirus pandemic, which later resulted in the number of games in the season being halved. During this time McNally was linked with a move to EFL League One side Ipswich Town. The move failed to materialise, however, and he stayed at St Patrick's Athletic and scored his first goal for the club in a 3–2 loss to Finn Harps on 8 October 2020 with a header from a corner. On 2 December 2020, he was named the club's Young Player of the Year for 2020, following a season which he was one of only three players in the entire league to play every minute of every game in the season.

=== Oxford United ===
On 29 January 2021 it was confirmed that EFL League One side Oxford United had signed McNally on a 3 1/2-year contract for an undisclosed fee. He spent his first few months at the club undergoing a 'mini pre-season' to get fit following a hip injury, first making the first-team matchday squad on 2 April 2021 when he was an unused substitute away to Sunderland. He made his debut for the first team in July 2021 in a friendly against Oxford City during pre-season, in which teammate and fellow defender Sam Long described him as "an absolute machine". His competitive debut for the club came on 11 August 2021 in an EFL Cup tie away to Burton Albion at Pirelli Stadium, which his side won 4–2 on penalties after a 1–1 draw in 90 minutes to earn a tie with Queens Park Rangers in the next round. He made his league debut three days later in a 2–1 win over Charlton Athletic at the Kassam Stadium. McNally scored his first goal in English football on 23 November 2021, opening the scoring in a 3–1 win at home to Fleetwood Town.

=== Burnley ===
On 28 June 2022, it was announced that McNally had signed for EFL Championship club Burnley on a four-year contract for an undisclosed fee believed to be in the region of £2 million, making him new manager Vincent Kompany's second signing for the club. He made his debut on 12 August 2022, coming off the bench late on in a makeshift striker role during a 1–0 defeat to Watford at Vicarage Road.

==== Coventry City loan ====
On 26 January 2023 with game time at Turf Moor proving difficult to come by, McNally signed for Championship club Coventry City on loan until the end of the season. McNally made 22 appearances in all competitions for the club, including the full 120 minutes of the 2023 EFL Championship play-off final as his side missed out on promotion to the Premier League by losing on penalties to Luton Town at Wembley Stadium.

==== Stoke City loan ====
Following Burnley's promotion to the Premier League, it was announced on 2 August 2023 that McNally had signed for EFL Championship club Stoke City on a season-long loan deal. On 21 October 2023, McNally scored his first goal for the club, scoring the winning goal in a 2–1 victory at home to Sunderland. McNally made 41 appearances for Stoke during the 2023–24 season as Stoke successfully fought against relegation. On 21 May 2024, Burnley confirmed that McNally would return to the club following the end of his loan spell.

=== Bristol City ===
On 30 August 2024, McNally signed for Bristol City for an undisclosed fee. On 9 February 2025, McNally suffered a season ending Anterior cruciate ligament injury in a 1–0 defeat to Swansea City at Ashton Gate Stadium. He had scored 3 goals in 27 appearances in all competitions in his first season with the club up to that point. After missing the entire 2025–26 season, McNally made his first appearance in 20 months on 10 October 2026, playing the full 90 minutes in a 1–1 draw away to Charlton Athletic.

== International career ==
McNally made his debut for the Republic of Ireland U19 team on 2 February 2017 in a 2–1 win over Czech Republic U19 at the RSC, playing alongside future Republic of Ireland senior internationals Aaron Connolly, Dara O'Shea, Mark Travers and Lee O'Connor. In August 2020, he was called up to Jim Crawford's Republic of Ireland U21 team for a training camp in Belfast ahead of their qualifiers in October and November. He was again called up to train with the squad ahead of the October clash with Italy U21.

== Career statistics ==
As of match played on 4 November 2026

Appearances and goals by club, season and competition
Club	Season	League			National Cup (Note: Includes FAI Cup, FA Cup)		League Cup (Note: Includes League of Ireland Cup, EFL Cup)		Other		Total	
Club	Season	Division	Apps	Goals	Apps	Goals	Apps	Goals	Apps	Goals	Apps	Goals
St Patrick's Athletic	2019	LOI Premier Division	0	0	0	0	0	0	0	0	0	0
St Patrick's Athletic	2020	LOI Premier Division	18	1	1	0	—		—		19	1
St Patrick's Athletic	Total		18	1	1	0	0	0	0	0	19	1
Drogheda United (loan)	2019	LOI First Division	27	6	2	0	1	0	4 (Note: Appearances in League of Ireland promotion/relegation playoffs)	3	34	9
Oxford United	2020–21	League One	0	0	—		—		0	0	0	0
Oxford United	2021–22	League One	30	4	1	0	2	0	2 (Note: Appearances in EFL Trophy)	0	35	4
Oxford United	Total		30	4	1	0	2	0	2	0	35	4
Burnley	2022–23	Championship	2	0	1	0	1	0	—		4	0
Burnley	2023–24	Premier League	0	0	—		—		—		0	0
Burnley	2024–25	Championship	2	0	—		1	0	—		3	0
Burnley	Total		4	0	1	0	2	0	—		7	0
Coventry City (loan)	2022–23	Championship	19	0	—		—		3 (Note: Appearance in the 2023 English Football League play-offs)	0	22	0
Stoke City (loan)	2023–24	Championship	38	2	1	0	2	0	—		41	2
Bristol City	2024–25	Championship	26	3	1	0	—		0	0	27	3
Bristol City	2025–26	Championship	0	0	0	0	0	0	—		0	0
Bristol City	2026–27	Championship	5	0	0	0	0	0	—		5	0
Bristol City	Total		31	3	1	0	0	0	0	0	32	3
Career total			167	16	7	0	7	0	9	3	189	19

== Honours ==
Club

Burnley

- EFL Championship: 2022–23

Individual

- Drogheda United Young Player of the Year: 2019
- St Patrick's Athletic Young Player of the Year: 2020
