= Callum Doyle =

English footballer (born 2003)

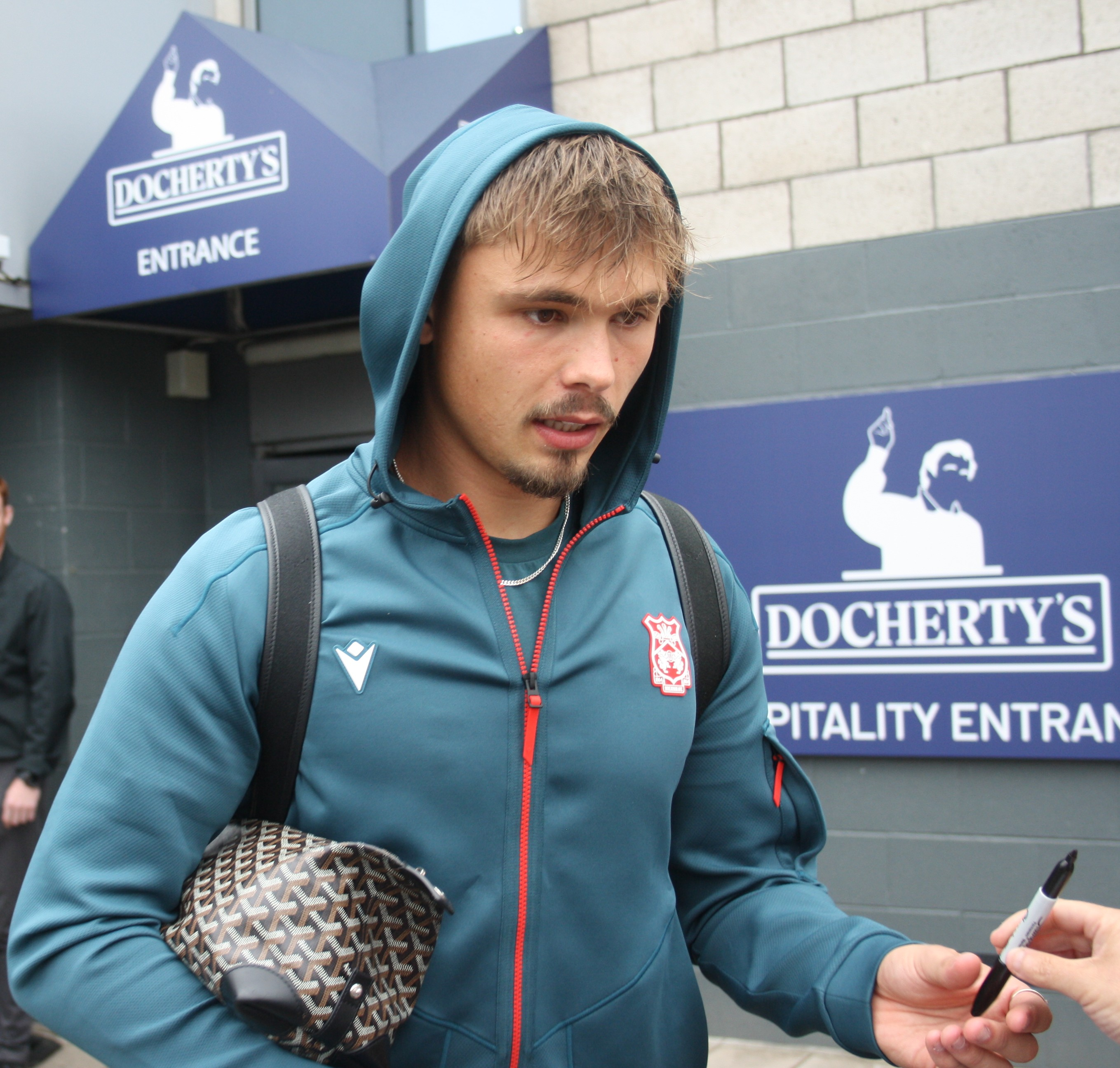
- Doyle in 2025

Personal information
- Full name: Callum Craig Doyle
- Date of birth: 3 October 2003 (age 23)
- Place of birth: Manchester, England
- Height: 6 ft 1 in (1.85 m)
- Position: Defender

Team information
- Current team: Wrexham
- Number: 2

Youth career
- –2021: Manchester City

Senior career*
Years	Team	Apps	(Gls)
2021–2025	Manchester City	0	(0)
2021–2022	→ Sunderland (loan)	36	(1)
2022–2023	→ Coventry City (loan)	41	(0)
2023–2024	→ Leicester City (loan)	17	(0)
2024–2025	→ Norwich City (loan)	40	(1)
2025–	Wrexham	49	(3)

International career^{‡}
2021	England U18	1	(0)
2021–2022	England U19	14	(1)
2022–2023	England U20	6	(0)
2023–2024	England U21	5	(2)
Medal record
Men's football
Representing England
UEFA European Under-19 Championship
Winner	2022
- * Club domestic league appearances and goals as of 09:16, 22 November 2026 (UTC) ‡ National team caps and goals as of 15:04, 6 November 2024 (UTC)

Callum Craig Doyle (born 3 October 2003) is an English professional footballer who plays as a defender for EFL Championship club Wrexham.

Beginning his career with Manchester City, Doyle spent loan spells with Sunderland, Coventry City, Leicester City, and Norwich City. With Sunderland he won promotion to the Championship, with Coventry he lost in the play-off final on penalties, and with Leicester he won automatic promotion after winning the Championship.

Doyle has represented England at various youth levels.

== Club career ==
Doyle began his career with Manchester City, moving on loan to Sunderland in July 2021. He made his professional debut on 7 August 2021, in a 2–1 league victory against Wigan Athletic, and he scored his first professional goal on 30 December 2021, in a 5–0 league win against Sheffield Wednesday. He made 44 appearances for the club in all competitions, as the club won promotion to the Championship via the play-offs.

On 12 July 2022, Doyle joined Championship club Coventry City on a season-long loan.

On 14 July 2023, he joined Championship club Leicester City on a season-long loan.

On 6 August 2024, he joined Championship side Norwich City on a season-long loan.

On 21 August 2025, Doyle signed for Championship side Wrexham on a four-year contract. In his first season at Wrexham he was named in the EFL Championship team of the season at the 2026 EFL awards.

== International career ==
Having represented England U18s, Doyle made his debut for the England U19s during a 2–0 victory over Italy U19s at St. George's Park on 2 September 2021.

On 17 June 2022, Doyle was included in the England U19 squad for the 2022 UEFA European Under-19 Championship. The England team won the tournament, beating Israel 3–1 in the final, with Doyle scoring England's first goal in that match.

On 10 May 2023, Doyle was included in the England squad for the 2023 FIFA U-20 World Cup. However, he did not arrive at the tournament until after the group stages due to Coventry City's participation in the 2023 EFL Championship play-off final. His only appearance of the tournament was as a late substitute in their round of sixteen defeat against Italy.

On 11 September 2023, Doyle made a goalscoring debut for England U21 during a 3–0 2025 UEFA European Under-21 Championship qualification win away to Luxembourg.

== Career statistics ==
As of match played on 21 November 2026

Appearances and goals by club, season and competition
Club	Season	League			FA Cup		EFL Cup		Other		Total	
Club	Season	Division	Apps	Goals	Apps	Goals	Apps	Goals	Apps	Goals	Apps	Goals
Manchester City	2020–21	Premier League	0	0	0	0	0	0	2 (Note: Appearances in the EFL Trophy for the U21s)	0	2	0
Manchester City	2021–22	Premier League	0	0	0	0	0	0	0	0	0	0
Manchester City	2022–23	Premier League	0	0	0	0	0	0	0	0	0	0
Manchester City	2023–24	Premier League	0	0	0	0	0	0	0	0	0	0
Manchester City	2024–25	Premier League	0	0	0	0	0	0	0	0	0	0
Manchester City	Total		0	0	0	0	0	0	0	0	0	0
Sunderland (loan)	2021–22	League One	36	1	1	0	4	0	3 (Note: Appearances in League One play-offs)	0	44	1
Coventry City (loan)	2022–23	Championship	41	0	1	0	1	0	3 (Note: Appearances in Championship play-offs)	0	46	0
Leicester City (loan)	2023–24	Championship	17	0	4	0	2	0	–		23	0
Norwich City (loan)	2024–25	Championship	40	1	1	0	2	0	–		43	1
Wrexham	2025–26	Championship	34	2	3	1	2	0	0	0	39	3
Wrexham	2026–27	Championship	15	1	0	0	1	0	0	0	16	1
Wrexham	Total		49	3	3	1	3	0	0	0	55	4
Career total			183	5	10	1	12	0	8	0	213	6

== Honours ==
Sunderland

- EFL League One play-offs: 2022

Leicester City

- EFL Championship: 2023–24

England U19

- UEFA European Under-19 Championship: 2022

Individual

- EFL Championship Team of the Year: 2025–26
