= Jonathan Panzo =

English footballer (born 2000)

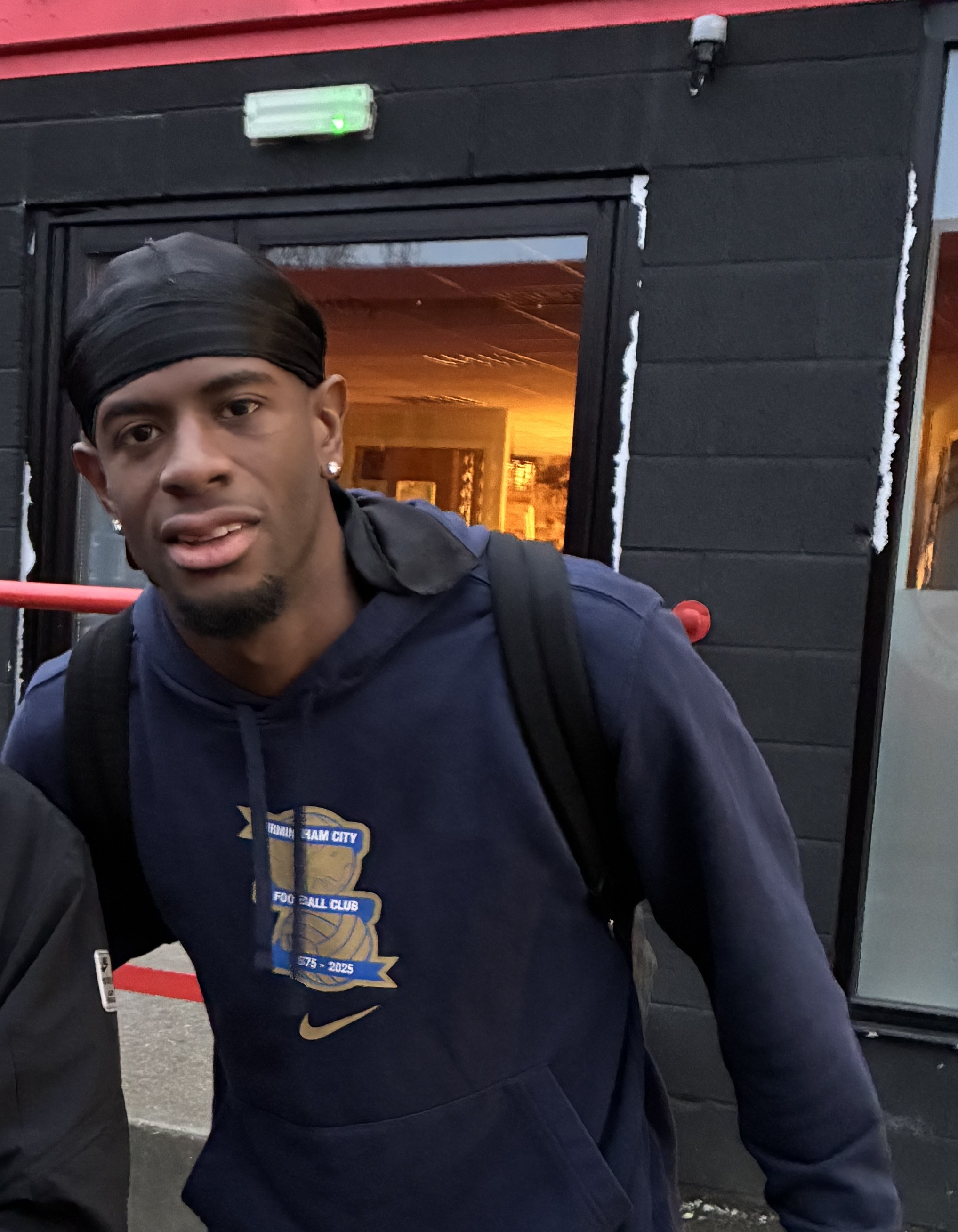
- Panzo in 2026.

Personal information
- Full name: Jonathan William Panzo
- Date of birth: 25 October 2000 (age 26)
- Place of birth: Brockley, London, England
- Height: 1.85 m (6 ft 1 in)
- Position: Centre-back

Team information
- Current team: Levadiakos
- Number: 4

Youth career
- 2010–2018: Chelsea

Senior career*
Years	Team	Apps	(Gls)
2018–2019	Monaco II	22	(1)
2018–2020	Monaco	2	(0)
2019–2020	→ Cercle Brugge (loan)	17	(0)
2020–2022	Dijon	22	(0)
2021–2022	Dijon II	4	(0)
2022–2025	Nottingham Forest	1	(0)
2022–2023	→ Coventry City (loan)	29	(1)
2023–2024	→ Cardiff City (loan)	4	(0)
2024	→ Standard Liège (loan)	11	(1)
2024–2025	→ Rio Ave (loan)	18	(1)
2025–2026	Rio Ave	14	(0)
2026	Birmingham City	8	(0)
2026–	Levadiakos	0	(0)

International career^{‡}
2015–2016	England U16	11	(0)
2016–2017	England U17	20	(0)
2017–2018	England U18	4	(0)
2018–2019	England U19	8	(0)
2019–2020	England U21	5	(0)
Medal record
Men's football
Representing England
FIFA U-17 World Cup
Winner	2017 India
UEFA European Under-17 Championship
Runner-up	2017 Croatia
- * Club domestic league appearances and goals as of 15:43, 6 April 2026 (UTC) ‡ National team caps and goals as of 22:14, 8 June 2023 (UTC)

Jonathan William Panzo (born 25 October 2000) is an English professional footballer who plays as a centre-back for Super League Greece club Levadiakos.

== Early life ==
Panzo was born in Brockley, London to parents from the Ivory Coast.

== Club career ==
=== Monaco ===
After playing for Chelsea, whom he joined at the age of nine, Panzo moved to Monaco in July 2018. He made his senior debut for their reserve team in the Championnat National 2. Panzo made his first team debut for Monaco on 19 December 2018, playing the full ninety minutes in 1–0 win over Lorient in the Coupe de la Ligue.

On 30 August 2019, Panzo joined Belgian club Cercle Brugge on a season-long loan.

=== Dijon ===
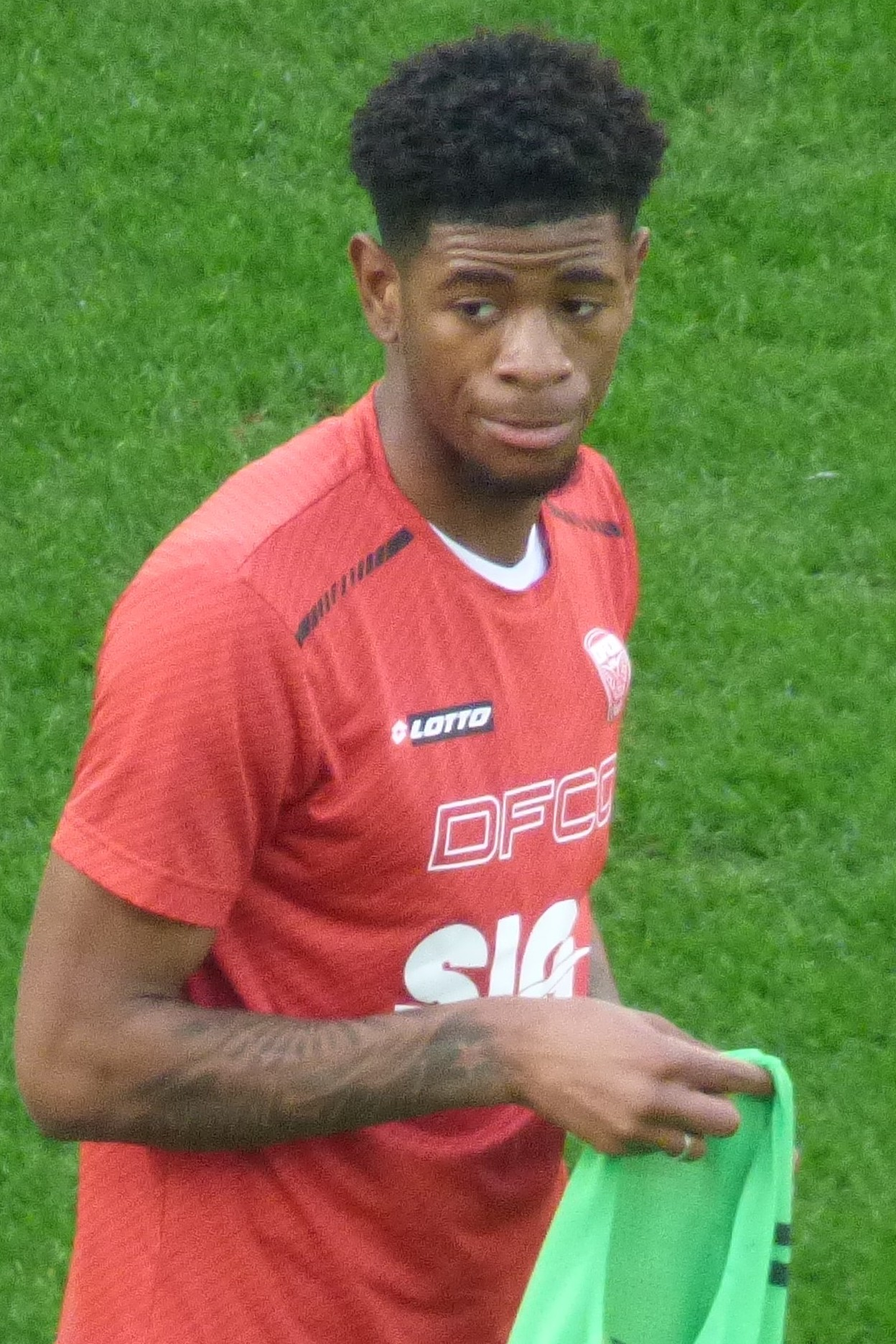
Panzo playing for Dijon in 2021.

In August 2020 he was linked with a return to the UK, with interest reported from Championship teams Coventry City, Derby County and Swansea City. Later that month, however, he was said to be close to remaining in France and transferring to Dijon. He eventually signed with club on 26 August 2020, for an undisclosed fee.

=== Nottingham Forest ===
On 31 January 2022, it was announced that Panzo had signed with Nottingham Forest of the EFL Championship managed by his former England U-17 coach Steve Cooper.

On 13 July 2022, Panzo joined Coventry City on loan for the 2022–23 season.

On 1 September 2023, Panzo joined Cardiff City on loan for the 2023–24 season. He was recalled in January 2024.

On 30 January 2024, he was loaned to Belgian Pro League side Standard Liège until the end of the season.

=== Rio Ave ===
On 17 July 2024, he moved on a season-long loan to Primeira Liga club Rio Ave.

On 2 June 2025, Panzo's move to Rio Ave was made permanent.

=== Birmingham City ===
Panzo returned to England on 2 February 2026, signing with Championship club Birmingham City. He was released in June 2026 following the end of his contract.

=== Levadiakos ===
On 15 September 2026, Panzo signed for Super League Greece club Levadiakos on a free transfer.

== International career ==
Panzo was part of the England U17 team which finished as runners-up to Spain in the 2017 UEFA European Under-17 Championship. He then went on to be part of the squad who beat Spain to win the 2017 FIFA U-17 World Cup. Panzo also represented England at under-19 level. He served as captain of the under-19 team.

On 30 August 2019, Panzo was included in the England U21 squad for the first time and made his debut during the 3–2 2021 U21 Euro qualifying win against Turkey on 6 September 2019.

== Career statistics ==
As of 6 April 2026

Club	Season	League			National cup (Note: Includes Belgian Cup, Coupe de France, FA Cup, Taça de Portugal)		League cup (Note: Includes Coupe de la Ligue, EFL Cup)		Other		Total	
Club	Season	Division	Apps	Goals	Apps	Goals	Apps	Goals	Apps	Goals	Apps	Goals
Monaco II	2018–19	Championnat National 2	22	1	—		—		—		22	1
Monaco	2018–19	Ligue 1	0	0	0	0	1	0	—		1	0
Monaco	2019–20	Ligue 1	2	0	0	0	0	0	—		2	0
Monaco	Total		2	0	0	0	1	0	0	0	3	0
Cercle Brugge (loan)	2019–20	Belgian First Division A	17	0	1	0	—		—		18	0
Dijon	2020–21	Ligue 1	22	0	1	0	—		—		23	0
Dijon	2021–22	Ligue 2	0	0	3	0	—		—		3	0
Dijon	Total		22	0	4	0	0	0	0	0	26	0
Dijon II	2021–22	Championnat National 3	4	0	—		—		—		4	0
Nottingham Forest	2021–22	Championship	1	0	0	0	0	0	—		1	0
Nottingham Forest	2022–23	Premier League	0	0	0	0	0	0	—		0	0
Nottingham Forest	2023–24	Premier League	0	0	0	0	0	0	—		0	0
Nottingham Forest	2024–25	Premier League	0	0	0	0	0	0	—		0	0
Nottingham Forest	Total		1	0	0	0	0	0	0	0	1	0
Coventry City (loan)	2022–23	Championship	29	1	1	0	0	0	2 (Note: Appearances in Championship play-offs)	0	32	1
Cardiff City (loan)	2023–24	Championship	4	0	0	0	1	0	—		5	0
Standard Liège (loan)	2023–24	Belgian Pro League	11	1	0	0	—		—		11	1
Rio Ave (loan)	2024–25	Primeira Liga	18	1	3	0	—		—		21	1
Rio Ave	2025–26	Primeira Liga	14	0	0	0	—		—		14	0
Birmingham City	2025–26	Championship	8	0	1	0	—		—		9	0
Career totals			152	4	10	0	2	0	2	0	166	4

== Honours ==
England U17

- FIFA U-17 World Cup: 2017
- UEFA European Under-17 Championship runner-up: 2017

Individual

- UEFA European Under-17 Championship Team of the Tournament: 2017
