= Ben Sheaf =

English footballer (born 1998)

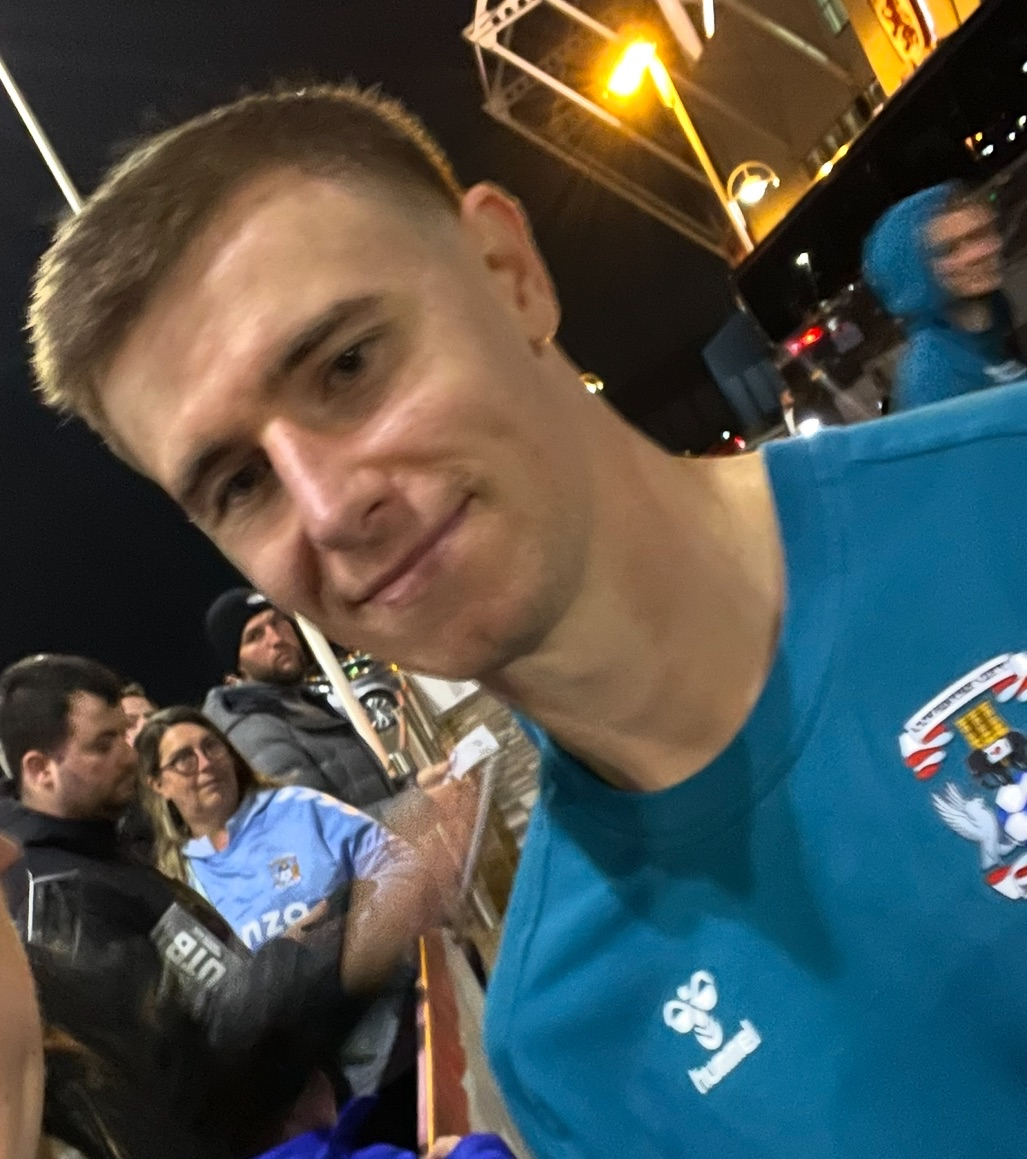
- Sheaf with Coventry City in 2024

Personal information
- Full name: Benjamin David Sheaf
- Date of birth: 5 February 1998 (age 28)
- Place of birth: Dartford, Kent, England
- Height: 6 ft 1 in (1.85 m)
- Position: Defensive midfielder

Team information
- Current team: Wrexham
- Number: 18

Youth career
- 2011–2014: West Ham United
- 2014–2017: Arsenal

Senior career*
Years	Team	Apps	(Gls)
2017–2021	Arsenal	0	(0)
2018	→ Stevenage (loan)	10	(0)
2019–2020	→ Doncaster Rovers (loan)	32	(1)
2020–2021	→ Coventry City (loan)	30	(0)
2021–2025	Coventry City	131	(7)
2025–	Wrexham	26	(0)

International career
2013–2014	England U16		
2015	England U18	2	(1)
- * Club domestic league appearances and goals as of 7 February 2026

Benjamin David Sheaf (born 5 February 1998) is an English professional footballer who plays as a defensive midfielder for EFL Championship club Wrexham. He has represented England at youth level.

== Club career ==
=== Arsenal ===
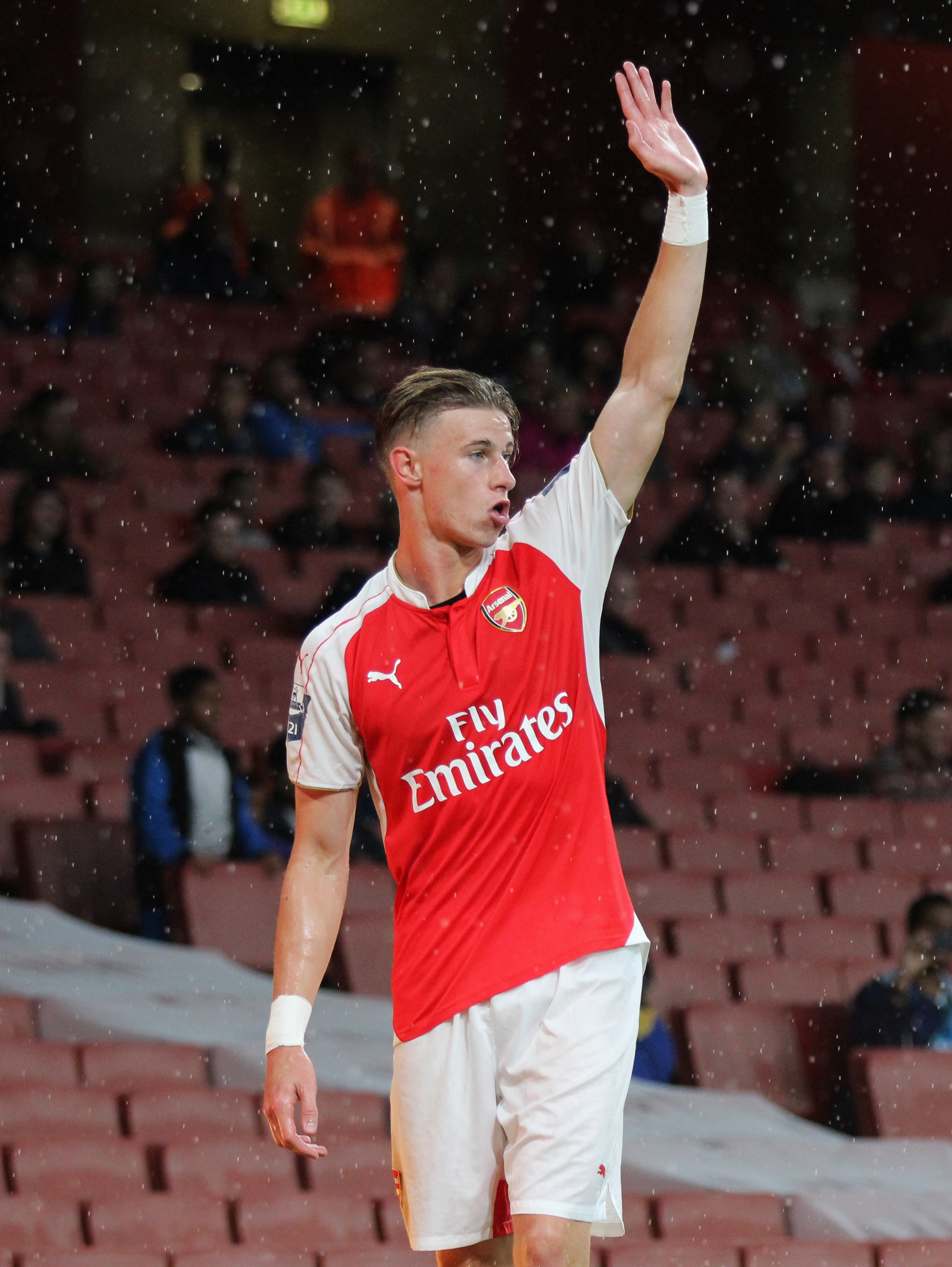
Sheaf with Arsenal U21 in 2015.

Sheaf started his youth career with the reserves of West Ham United at the age of 13, before joining the Arsenal youth setup on 2 July 2014. He earned the praise of senior team manager Arsène Wenger who said that Sheaf was "always ahead of the game". He scored his first goal for the Arsenal U19 in a 3–2 victory over Greek club Olympiacos on 29 September 2015, where he found the net in the 41st minute from the penalty spot.

In October 2015, Sheaf was invited to train with the first team, and days later he was an unused substitute in the club's 3–0 defeat against Sheffield Wednesday. He stated that, although the result was not satisfactory, the experience of being involved in the first-team was good for him as he got to "see how things are done". He made his first-team debut for Arsenal on 19 October 2017, coming on as an 89th-minute substitute for Francis Coquelin in a 1–0 victory over Red Star Belgrade in the UEFA Europa League.

==== Loan to Stevenage ====
Sheaf joined League Two side Stevenage on loan on 26 January 2018, joining the Hertfordshire club on a deal until the end of the 2017–18 season. He made his debut in a 2–0 loss against Notts County in League Two on 24 February. He made 10 appearances for the side by the end of the loan spell.

==== Loan to Doncaster Rovers ====
Sheaf joined League One side Doncaster Rovers on loan on 12 July 2019, joining the League One side for six months. He made his debut and was named in the starting line-up in a 1–1 draw against Gillingham on 3 August. His loan deal was extended until the end of the 2019–20 season on 7 January 2020. On 15 February 2020, he scored his first goal for the club in a 2–1 defeat against Gillingham in the reverse fixture. At the end, Sheaf played 38 games in all competitions for the side.

==== Coventry City ====
On 4 September 2020, Sheaf joined newly-promoted Championship side Coventry City on a season-long loan deal with the option to make the deal permanent after. He made his first appearance for the club in a 2–1 defeat against Bristol City on 12 September.

Sheaf signed for Coventry City on a three-year deal in July 2021.

==== Wrexham ====
On 1 September 2025, Sheaf joined Championship side Wrexham on a three-year deal.

== International career ==
Sheaf debuted for England under-16 team in the Victory Shield. As of July 2014, he has played twice for the under-16 national team. He was part of the England U18s which played a couple of friendlies against the Netherlands in September 2015. They won 2–0 in the first game which Sheaf scored a penalty and drew the second game 0–0.

== Personal life ==
Sheaf comes from a sporting family. His mother was a top-level volleyball and beach volleyball player, and his older brother Jake was also a professional beach volleyball player. Sheaf's father was a footballer at county level, whilst his younger brother Max is a current player for Hednesford Town FC winning promotion to the National League North in 2025-26 season.

== Career statistics ==
As of match played on 13 February 2026

Appearances and goals by club, season and competition
Club	Season	League			FA Cup		League Cup		Other		Total	
Club	Season	Division	Apps	Goals	Apps	Goals	Apps	Goals	Apps	Goals	Apps	Goals
Arsenal	2017–18	Premier League	0	0	0	0	1	0	1 (Note: Appearance in Europa League)	0	2	0
Arsenal	2018–19	Premier League	0	0	0	0	0	0	1 (Note: Appearance(s) in EFL Trophy for Arsenal U21 Squad)	0	1	0
Arsenal	2019–20	Premier League	0	0	0	0	0	0	—		0	0
Arsenal	2020–21	Premier League	0	0	0	0	0	0	—		0	0
Arsenal	Total		0	0	0	0	1	0	2	0	3	0
Stevenage (loan)	2017–18	League Two	10	0	0	0	0	0	—		10	0
Doncaster Rovers (loan)	2019–20	League One	32	1	3	0	1	0	2 (Note: Appearance(s) in EFL Trophy)	0	38	1
Coventry City (loan)	2020–21	Championship	30	0	1	0	1	0	—		32	0
Coventry City	2021–22	Championship	35	2	2	0	0	0	—		37	2
Coventry City	2022–23	Championship	35	2	1	1	0	0	2 (Note: Appearances in the EFL Championship play-offs)	0	38	3
Coventry City	2023–24	Championship	31	3	3	1	1	0	0	0	35	4
Coventry City	2024–25	Championship	29	0	0	0	2	0	2	0	33	0
Coventry City	2025–26	Championship	1	0	0	0	0	0	0	0	1	0
Coventry City	Total		131	7	6	2	3	0	4	0	144	9
Wrexham	2025–26	Championship	26	0	2	0	0	0	0	0	28	0
Career total			229	8	12	2	6	0	8	0	255	10
