= Ben Wilson (footballer, born 1992) =

English footballer (born 1992)

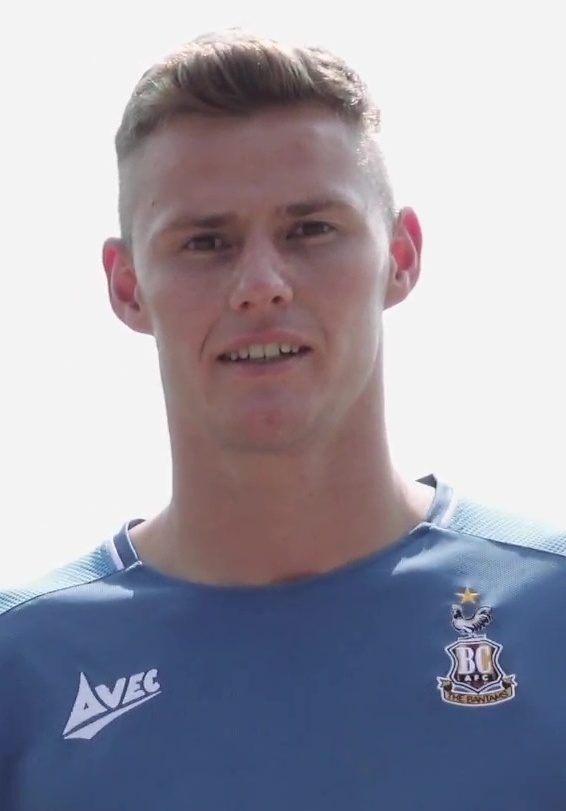
- Wilson in 2018

Personal information
- Full name: Ben Wilson
- Date of birth: 9 August 1992 (age 34)
- Place of birth: Stanley, England
- Height: 1.86 m (6 ft 1 in)
- Position: Goalkeeper

Team information
- Current team: Coventry City
- Number: 13

Youth career
- 2006–2011: Sunderland

Senior career*
Years	Team	Apps	(Gls)
2011–2013	Sunderland	0	(0)
2011	→ Harrogate Town (loan)	3	(0)
2012	→ Gateshead (loan)	0	(0)
2012–2013	→ Chesterfield (loan)	0	(0)
2013	Cambridge United	0	(0)
2013	Accrington Stanley	1	(0)
2014–2018	Cardiff City	4	(0)
2015	→ AFC Wimbledon (loan)	9	(0)
2017	→ Rochdale (loan)	8	(0)
2017–2018	→ Oldham Athletic (loan)	7	(0)
2018	→ AFC Telford United (loan)	17	(0)
2018–2019	Bradford City	6	(0)
2019–	Coventry City	97	(1)
- * Club domestic league appearances and goals as of 16:59, 25 August 2026 (UTC)

Ben Wilson (born 9 August 1992) is an English professional footballer who plays as a goalkeeper for Premier League club Coventry City.

== Career ==
=== Early career ===
Wilson began his career with Sunderland in 2006, earning a professional contract in 2010. He was sent on loan to Harrogate Town in 2013, playing three times.

Wilson was sent out on loan to Gateshead and Chesterfield, failing to make an appearance for either, and was released by Sunderland in the summer of 2013.

After leaving Sunderland, Wilson joined Cambridge United on a non-contract basis on 9 August 2013. He joined Accrington Stanley on 27 August 2013, and made his professional debut on 3 September 2013 in a 1–0 defeat against Crewe Alexandra in the Football League Trophy.

Wilson left Stanley after a single Football League Trophy appearance in November 2013; his contract was terminated by mutual consent.

=== Cardiff City ===
Wilson joined Cardiff City in the same month. On 7 July 2014, he played 10 minutes as a midfielder against Carmarthen Town in a friendly. He featured on the bench several times during the 2014–15 season and made several under-21 appearances. The following season, Wilson signed a new contract, keeping him in South Wales until 2017. He made his Cardiff debut against AFC Wimbledon on 11 August 2015, in the League Cup.

Two months later, Wilson joined AFC Wimbledon on an emergency one-month loan deal. Wilson was signed as a short-term replacement for the injured first-choice keeper James Shea. He made his Wimbledon debut on the same day he was signed in a 4–3 League Two away win against Accrington Stanley. However, after conceding a goal from a speculative long free-kick taken by Jerome Okimo from inside his own half in a 2–1 defeat to Stevenage, Wilson became embroiled in a social media row with Wimbledon supporters after they criticized his performance on Twitter. Wimbledon terminated his loan spell early on 14 December 2015.

His league debut for Cardiff City came on 27 August 2016, when he played in a 1–0 loss to Reading, after signing a two-year contract extension. Having not appeared for Cardiff since September 2016, Wilson then joined League One side Rochdale on loan for the remainder of the 2016–17 season.

At the start of the following season, Wilson joined Oldham Athletic on loan until 1 January 2018. On 31 January 2018, he was then loaned to non-league Telford United, making 17 league appearances.

=== Bradford City ===
Wilson signed for Bradford City in July 2018. In May 2019, following Bradford City's relegation to League Two, it was announced that he would leave the club when his contract expired on 30 June 2019.

=== Coventry City ===
In May 2019, Wilson agreed a three-year deal with Coventry City, which began in July 2019. He spent the 2019–20 season as backup to first-choice goalkeeper Marko Marosi and was limited to cup competitions.

He began the 2020–21 season in the same role, but made his league debut for the club as a late substitute in a 1–0 win at Cardiff after Marosi was injured. Subsequently, in Marosi's absence, he went on to start Coventry's next five matches.

Wilson ended the 2020–21 season as The Sky Blues' first-choice keeper. However, following the arrival of Simon Moore ahead of the 2021–22 season, Wilson reverted to substitute keeper as the club mounted a play-off push over the course of the campaign. Wilson did, however, play the final three matches of the season, and in the first of which he saved a last-minute penalty to ensure a point and a 0–0 draw in an away match with West Bromwich Albion

After Moore made several costly errors in the first three matches of the 2022–23 season, Wilson regained his starting berth and played in every league match after. On 20 January 2023, Wilson signed a new two-and-a-half-year contract keeping him at the club until 2025. On 19 April 2023, he scored a 95th-minute equalizer from a corner to secure a 1–1 away draw against fellow play-off rivals Blackburn Rovers, becoming the first Sky Blues keeper to score from open play since club legend Steve Ogrizovic in 1986. Wilson ended the campaign with an EFL Golden Glove-winning 20 clean sheets in 43 league starts, added two more shutouts in the Championship playoffs, and was named to the Championship Team of the Season.

After a strong previous campaign, Wilson began the 2023–24 season as the club's first-choice goalkeeper; however, he eventually lost his place to summer arrival Brad Collins and returned to being a substitute keeper.

== Career statistics ==
As of the match played on 10 January 2026

Appearances and goals by club, season and competition
Club	Season	League			FA Cup		League Cup		Other		Total	
Club	Season	Division	Apps	Goals	Apps	Goals	Apps	Goals	Apps	Goals	Apps	Goals
Harrogate Town (loan)	2011–12	Conference North	3	0	0	0	—		—		3	0
Gateshead (loan)	2011–12	Conference Premier	0	0	0	0	—		—		0	0
Chesterfield (loan)	2012–13	League Two	0	0	0	0	0	0	—		0	0
Cambridge United	2013–14	Conference Premier	0	0	0	0	0	0	—		0	0
Accrington Stanley	2013–14	League Two	0	0	0	0	0	0	1 (Note: Appearances in EFL Trophy)	0	1	0
Cardiff City	2014–15	Championship	0	0	0	0	0	0	—		0	0
Cardiff City	2015–16	Championship	0	0	0	0	1	0	—		1	0
Cardiff City	2016–17	Championship	3	0	0	0	0	0	—		0	0
Cardiff City	Total		3	0	0	0	1	0	0	0	4	0
AFC Wimbledon (loan)	2015–16	League Two	8	0	1	0	0	0	—		9	0
Rochdale (loan)	2016–17	League One	8	0	0	0	0	0	—		8	0
Oldham Athletic (loan)	2017–18	League One	5	0	0	0	1	0	1	0	7	0
AFC Telford United (loan)	2017–18	National League North	17	0	0	0	—		—		17	0
Bradford City	2018–19	League One	4	0	1	0	1	0	—		6	0
Coventry City	2019–20	League One	0	0	1	0	2	0	4	0	7	0
Coventry City	2020–21	Championship	27	0	1	0	0	0	—		28	0
Coventry City	2021–22	Championship	5	0	1	0	1	0	—		7	0
Coventry City	2022–23	Championship	43	1	0	0	1	0	3 (Note: Appearances in EFL Championship play-offs)	0	47	1
Coventry City	2023–24	Championship	18	0	4	0	0	0	0	0	22	0
Coventry City	2024–25	Championship	4	0	0	0	3	0	2	0	9	0
Coventry City	2025–26	Championship	0	0	1	0	2	0	0	0	3	0
Coventry City	2026–27	Premier League	0	0	0	0	0	0	0	0	0	0
Coventry City	Total		97	1	8	0	9	0	9	0	123	1
Career total			145	1	10	0	12	0	11	0	179	1

== Honours ==
Coventry City

- EFL Championship: 2025–26

Individual

- EFL Championship Golden Glove: 2022–23
- EFL Championship Team of the Season: 2022–23
