= 2018–19 Luton Town F.C. season =

English football club season

Luton Town F.C.
2018–19 season
- Owner: Luton Town Football Club 2020 Limited
- Chairman: David Wilkinson
- Manager: Nathan Jones (until 9 January 2019); Mick Harford (interim, from 10 January 2019 to 7 May 2019); Graeme Jones (from 7 May 2019)
- Stadium: Kenilworth Road
- League One: 1st (promoted)
- FA Cup: Third round (eliminated by Sheffield Wednesday)
- EFL Cup: First round (eliminated by West Bromwich Albion)
- EFL Trophy: Second round (eliminated by Southend United)
- Top goalscorer: League: James Collins (25); All: James Collins (25)
- Highest home attendance: 10,089 vs Oxford United, League One, 4 May 2019
- Lowest home attendance: 875 vs Milton Keynes Dons, EFL Trophy, 9 October 2018
- Average home league attendance: 9,516
Home colours	Away colours	Third colours

The 2018–19 season was the 133rd in the history of Luton Town Football Club, a professional association football club based in Luton, Bedfordshire, England. Their promotion from League Two in 2017–18 meant it was the club's first season in League One after a 10-year absence and 93rd season in the English Football League. The season ran from 1 July 2018 to 30 June 2019.

== Background and pre-season ==
The 2017–18 season was Nathan Jones' second full season as manager of Luton Town, having been appointed in January 2016. Luton began the season with an 8–2 victory over Yeovil Town, the club's biggest Football League victory since December 1996. Inconsistent results in their first six league matches left the club in mid-table, but seven wins from their next nine league matches, including a 7–1 win over Stevenage, saw Luton return to the top of the table. The club's first defeat in 10 league matches meant they lost first place once more, but they soon regained it three matches later, during which time they became the first team in the history of the Football League to score seven or more goals on three occasions before Christmas, after defeating Cambridge United 7–0. By early December, Luton were the highest-scoring team in the country with 63 goals in all competitions. However, their FA Cup third round exit at the hands of Newcastle United in January was followed up with a run of four wins from 12 league matches, which meant they relinquished first position once again in March. Luton finished the season in second place and were promoted to League One after a 10-year absence.

Pre-season match details
Date	Opponents	Venue	Result	Score F–A	Scorers	Attendance	Ref.
6 July 2018	Hitchin Town	A	W	6–2	Collins 22', Lee 39', Cornick 53', Jervis 70' pen., Gambin (2) 85', 90'	788	
13 July 2018	HNK Rijeka	N	L	0–2			
17 July 2018	Oxford City	A	L	0–3			
18 July 2018	Chesham United	A	W	5–1	Jervis 30', Grant (2) 65', 80', Hylton 84', Pearson 87'		
21 July 2018	St Albans City	A	W	6–3	Hylton (3) 5', 43', 45+3', Grant 16', Read 63', Collins 76'	1,044	
25 July 2018	Norwich City	H	L	1–3	Gambin 56'	2,957	
28 July 2018	Notts County	H	W	2–0	Grant 49', Lee 63'	2,301	
31 July 2018	Bedford Town	A	W	2–0	Tomlinson (2) 22', 75'	762	

== Review ==
=== August ===
Luton started the season with a 1–0 away defeat to Portsmouth on their return to League One, with Jamal Lowe scoring the winning goal in the 16th minute. The team recorded their first point of the season after drawing 1–1 at home to Sunderland, who took the lead shortly before half-time through Josh Maja with a shot into the bottom corner, before Matty Pearson equalised on 68 minutes from Alan Sheehan's cross. This was followed by a 1–0 away defeat to West Bromwich Albion in the first round of the EFL Cup, after Oliver Burke scored for the Championship team in the 62nd minute. Luton were beaten 3–1 away to Peterborough United, who were three goals up by half-time with two goals from Jason Cummings and one from Siriki Dembélé, before Danny Hylton scored a consolation goal for Luton from Andrew Shinnie's cross 12 minutes from time. Their first win of the season came after a 2–0 home victory over Southend United, in which Elliot Lee scored from seven yards to give Luton a second-minute lead after a shot from Pelly Ruddock Mpanzu deflected into his path. Hylton finished the scoring on 33 minutes with a penalty after Lee was fouled by Elvis Bwomono in the penalty area. Luton recorded a second successive home win after beating Shrewsbury Town 3–2, the away team taking the lead through a 23rd-minute penalty scored by Shaun Whalley. Jorge Grant levelled the score early into the second half with a free kick from 20 yards, before Lee Angol restored Shrewsbury's lead 15 minutes later after capitalising on a mistake by James Shea. Jack Stacey equalised from close range in the 73rd minute, and Lee scored the winning goal with a deflected 22-yard free kick three minutes later. Leeds United midfielder Eunan O'Kane was signed on loan until 10 January 2019, while Jake Jervis and Luke Gambin were loaned to AFC Wimbledon and Crawley Town respectively until the end of the season.

=== September ===
Luton went behind away to Wycombe Wanderers when Joe Jacobson scored a penalty in the 15th minute, who had another penalty saved by Shea in the second half, before Pearson equalised with a 68th-minute header, meaning the match ended in a 1–1 draw. Forward Josh Neufville signed a two-year professional contract with the club. Aaron Jarvis scored with a powerful shot into the bottom corner from six yards to give Luton a fifth-minute lead at home to Brighton & Hove Albion U21 in their opening EFL Trophy group stage match, and Grant scored on 79 minutes with a deflected shot to make the score 2–0. However, Brighton scored a consolation goal through Aaron Connolly with a header in the 86th minute, and the match finished as a 2–1 victory. Assistant manager Paul Hart was released from his contract to allow him to join Notts County as technical director. A 2–1 defeat away to Doncaster Rovers saw Luton's four-match unbeaten run come to an end, with the home team taking the lead in the sixth minute through Matty Blair. Lee equalised with a header shortly before half-time, and Ben Whiteman scored the winner for Doncaster less than a minute into the second half with a deflected 20-yard shot. Shinnie scored Luton's only goal in a 1–0 home win over Bristol Rovers with a low shot in the 62nd minute. Luton then drew 0–0 away to Blackpool. Free agent winger Kazenga LuaLua was signed on a contract until the end of the season. Luton drew 2–2 at home to Charlton Athletic, who had been on a four-match winning run. After going behind to Tariqe Fosu's 23rd-minute penalty, Luton scored two second half goals through Harry Cornick and James Collins, before Chris Solly equalised for Charlton with a volley in the fifth minute of stoppage time.

=== October ===
Steve Rutter, a former coach educator for The Football Association who taught Jones during his coaching courses, was appointed as assistant manager. Luton achieved their first away win of the season after beating Oxford United 2–1. Ricky Holmes gave the home team the lead early in the second half, before Luton equalised through Collins who followed up for the rebound after Cornick's shot had hit the crossbar from Mpanzu's cross. Potts scored the winning goal in the 98th minute with a header from Sheehan's free kick, after he had a goal disallowed earlier in stoppage time. Luton won 3–2 at home to Scunthorpe United, and took the lead in the 10th minute with a Cornick shot from a tight angle, before Scunthorpe equalised seven minutes later through Lee Novak. Lee restored Luton's lead in the 26th minute with a 20-yard left-footed shot and James Justin converted Stacey's low cross on 85 minutes, before Stephen Humphrys scored a consolation goal for Scunthorpe in stoppage time. Luton progressed to the second round of the EFL Trophy as Southern Group H winners after a 3–0 home win over Milton Keynes Dons, in which they took the lead in the 17th minute when Sheehan scored a penalty after David Kasumu tripped Shinnie. LuaLua doubled the lead with a curling shot into the bottom corner on 29 minutes, and Grant finished the scoring 15 minutes into the second half with a close-range header.

After a six-match unbeaten run in all competitions, Luton were defeated 3–2 away to Barnsley, with Brad Potts giving the home team the lead on five minutes with a low shot from 20 yards, and Cameron McGeehan scored in the 26th minute to make the score 2–0. Collins scored both of Luton's goals, the first in first-half stoppage time with a penalty, and the second in the 86th minute from the rebound after LuaLua's cross hit the post, either side of Mamadou Thiam's curling shot on 79 minutes. Luton entered their home match against Walsall with the visitors unbeaten away from home, and won 2–0 with goals scored in each half by Glen Rea from a Grant corner and Grant with a free kick from 25 yards. Luton moved into the play-off positions with a 4–1 home win over Accrington Stanley, taking the lead on five minutes when Hylton converted Justin's cross with a volley from close range, before the away team equalised through Offrande Zanzala with a powerful header in the 27th minute. After Shinnie restored Luton's lead with a 20-yard shot into the bottom corner in the 53rd minute, Hylton scored a minute later, before he completed his hat-trick on 70 minutes with a close-range header. Frankie Musonda joined National League South club Oxford City on a one-month loan. Luton won away to AFC Wimbledon in a league match for the first time after a 2–0 victory, with Mpanzu and Lee scoring in the second half.

=== November ===
Shea made a number of saves as Luton held Rochdale to a 0–0 away draw, in which Hylton was sent off for a studs-up challenge on Ian Henderson. Luton beat Wycombe Wanderers 2–0 at home in the first round of the FA Cup, with Shinnie opening the scoring from a left-footed 25-yard curling shot in off the post in the 41st minute, before Cornick capitalised on a mistake by Adam El-Abd, scoring with a shot into the bottom corner on 71 minutes. The team lost 2–1 away to Peterborough United in their final EFL Trophy group stage match, and were 2–0 down at half-time after goals from Colin Daniel and Ivan Toney, before Luton recorded a consolation goal after goalkeeper Conor O'Malley dropped Pearson's cross and scored an own goal in the 73rd minute.

Luton achieved their first home league win over Plymouth Argyle since 2003 after a 5–1 victory. Collins opened the scoring in the 12th minute with a shot into the bottom corner, before Lee rebounded in Cornick's parried shot on 23 minutes. Justin extended the lead six minutes later, and won a penalty in first-half stoppage time converted by Collins, which made the half-time score 4–0. Collins completed his hat-trick in the second half, and Plymouth scored a consolation goal through Joel Grant late into the match. Luton won for the seventh time in nine league matches after beating Gillingham 3–1 away, a result that saw them move into fourth place in the table. Shinnie gave Luton the lead in the 25th minute with a shot from the edge of the penalty area before Lee doubled the lead 10 minutes into the second half with a shot in off the crossbar from Collins' low cross. Lee made it 3–0 on 68 minutes with a shot into an empty net after Cornick's low shot hit the post, and Tom Eaves scored a consolation goal for Gillingham four minutes later from a tight angle. Justin rebounded in Cornick's parried shot to give Luton a 28th-minute lead in a home match against Bradford City. Lee scored twice in five minutes to make the score 3–0, and in the second half Cornick finished the scoring in the 89th minute, meaning the match ended in a 4–0 win.

=== December ===
Luton won 1–0 away in their second-round match of the FA Cup against Bury, with Cornick scoring the winning goal in the 42nd minute. Luton then played Southend United at home in the EFL Trophy second round, and took the lead in the 81st minute through Arthur Read with a shot from 18 yards before Stephen McLaughlin equalised for the visitors seven minutes later with a deflected 20-yard shot. The match finished 1–1 after normal time and Luton lost the penalty shoot-out 4–2, meaning they were eliminated from the competition. Luton moved into the automatic promotion places in second place with a 2–0 home win over Fleetwood Town, in which they took the lead on 11 minutes when Cornick converted Shinnie's low cross, before Craig Morgan scored an own goal in the 80th minute. Connor Tomlinson joined National League South club Hemel Hempstead Town on a youth loan for one month.

Luton won away to Coventry City for the first time since 1987 after a 2–1 victory, with the team's goals coming in the 38th and 57th minute from Pearson and Collins respectively, before Jonson Clarke-Harris scored a consolation goal for Coventry with a stoppage time penalty. Luton moved four points clear of third-placed Sunderland after beating Burton Albion 2–0 at home. Stacey opened the scoring in the first half with a left-footed shot into the bottom corner, and in the second half Collins scored a penalty after Hylton was fouled by Jamie Allen in the penalty area. Midfielder Drew Richardson, a first-year scholar, joined Isthmian League Premier Division club Harlow Town on work experience for one month. Shinnie and Cornick scored in each half of Luton's 2–0 away win over Scunthorpe United, a result that saw them move one point behind league-leaders Portsmouth. Luton had fallen two goals behind away to Walsall by the 67th minute with goals from Morgan Ferrier and Andy Cook. Collins brought Luton back into the match five minutes later with a shot through the legs of goalkeeper Liam Roberts from 10 yards, before LuaLua equalised in the fourth minute of stoppage time, meaning the match ended in a 2–2 draw. The result meant Luton would begin 2019 on a 12-match unbeaten league run.

=== January ===
Luton's first result of 2019 was a 0–0 home draw with Barnsley, with the best chance of the match coming from Lee's 20-yard shot which was saved by goalkeeper Adam Davies. Luton drew 0–0 away to Sheffield Wednesday to earn a third round replay in the FA Cup. Midfielder George Thorne joined on loan from Derby County until the end of the season, while Grant returned to Nottingham Forest after his loan was terminated early. Jones left Luton after being appointed the manager of Championship club Stoke City, with chief recruitment officer Mick Harford being appointed interim manager. Musonda joined Hemel Hempstead Town on loan until the end of the season. Collins scored a 67th-minute penalty as Luton came from behind to draw 1–1 away to Sunderland after Chris Maguire had given the home team the lead on 16 minutes. Luton were knocked out of the FA Cup after losing 1–0 at home to Sheffield Wednesday in a third round replay, who scored their goal a minute into the second half through Atdhe Nuhiu. Barnsley midfielder George Moncur was signed on a two-and-a-half-year contract for an undisclosed fee, and Jack James joined Havant & Waterlooville of the National League on a one-month youth loan.

Luton moved to within a point of Portsmouth once more with a 4–0 home win over Peterborough United, courtesy of a Collins hat-trick and Luke Berry's first goal of the season. Defender Toby Byron, a second-year scholar, joined Southern League Premier Division Central club Hitchin Town on work experience for one month. Pearson scored a 29th-minute header from a Justin corner as Luton beat Southend United 1–0 away and moved to the top of the table. Famewo was recalled from his loan at Grimsby and joined Championship club Norwich City for an undisclosed fee. Luton recorded their first league win over Portsmouth since 1995 after a 3–2 home victory, a result which saw them move five points clear of their second-placed opponents. The team were 1–0 up at half-time through Collins with a shot into the bottom corner, before Ronan Curtis equalised for Portsmouth early in the second half. Collins restored Luton's lead with a 77th-minute penalty, and Omar Bogle scored two minutes later to bring the score to 2–2, before Moncur scored the winner for Luton on 86 minutes with a free kick into the bottom corner. Queens Park Rangers defender Alex Baptiste, Nottingham Forest and Scotland international striker Jason Cummings, and Brighton & Hove Albion striker Aaron Connolly, a Republic of Ireland under-19 international, were signed on loan for the rest of 2018–19, while Lloyd Jones, Jack Senior and Jarvis were loaned to Plymouth, Harrogate Town and Falkirk respectively until the end of the season.

=== February ===
Luton moved six points clear at the top of the League One table with a 3–0 away win over Shrewsbury Town, in which Collins scored in each half, either side of Pearson's 53rd-minute cross into the top corner. This was followed by another 3–0 victory, this time at home to Wycombe Wanderers, which meant Luton equalled a club record of 19 matches unbeaten in the Football League. Luton took the lead in the 33rd minute when Collins converted Stacey's cross, before Moncur scored twice late in the second half. Harford's appointment as interim manager was extended until the end of the season. Luton set a new club record of 20 matches unbeaten in the Football League after beating Fleetwood Town 2–1 away. Moncur opened the scoring in the first half with a free kick into the top corner, and in the second half Mpanzu scored with a 20-yard curling shot before Fleetwood recorded a consolation goal through Paddy Madden in stoppage time. Read joined Hemel Hempstead Town on a one-month youth loan. Luton's six-match winning run came to an end after drawing 1–1 at home to Coventry City, in which Luton took the lead in the 16th minute through Pearson with a header from Justin's corner, before Jordan Shipley scored Coventry's equaliser later in the first half.

=== March ===
Hylton scored his first goal since October to give Luton a 59th-minute lead at home to Rochdale, before Collins scored his 20th goal of the season in stoppage time, meaning the team won 2–0. Luton extended their unbeaten league run to 23 matches after drawing 0–0 away to Plymouth Argyle. Stacey scored in the 16th minute from a low shot as Luton beat Bradford City 1–0 away, and the result meant the team set a new club record of 12 away matches unbeaten in the Football League. Goalkeeper Tiernan Parker joined Hitchin Town on a work experience loan. Luton were held by Gillingham to a 2–2 home draw, in which they took the lead shortly before half-time through Hylton, before Tom Eaves equalised for the away team with a header early in the second half. Stacey restored Luton's lead on 67 minutes with a near post shot past goalkeeper Tomáš Holý, and Luke O'Neill finished the scoring for Gillingham 12 minutes later with a free kick into the top corner. Mpanzu gave Luton a 33rd-minute lead at home to Doncaster Rovers with a 20-yard side-footed shot into the bottom corner, before Hylton doubled the lead with a close-range finish on 57 minutes. LuaLua made the score 3–0 in the 82nd minute, and Berry finished the scoring in stoppage time. Luton won an away league match against Bristol Rovers for the first time since 1980 with a 2–1 victory and equalled a club record of 27 league matches unbeaten in the process. Luton took a two-goal lead through Collins and Berry, before Jonson Clarke-Harris scored a consolation goal for Bristol Rovers in first-half stoppage time.

=== April and May ===
Luton drew 2–2 at home to Blackpool and extended their unbeaten league run to a club record 28 matches. Collins opened the scoring for Luton in the sixth minute from LuaLua's low cross, before Nya Kirby equalised for the visitors with a 20-yard volley on 30 minutes. Collins was sent off after receiving two yellow cards in two second-half minutes, and after Blackpool took the lead through Matty Virtue, Cummings scored four minutes from time to bring the score to 2–2. Luton lost 3–1 away to Charlton Athletic, despite taking the lead in the 15th minute through Cornick with a shot into the top corner. Lyle Taylor scored twice during the second half for the home team, the first coming on 54 minutes with a penalty and the second coming on 72 minutes from a low shot, either side of Igor Vetokele's 70th-minute goal. The result ended Luton's run of 76 matches unbeaten in all competitions in which they scored the opening goal.

Luton won 3–0 away to Accrington Stanley, and took the lead through Collins with a penalty in the 24th minute, before Mpanzu scored twice in the second half. This was followed by a 2–2 home draw with AFC Wimbledon, in which Luton took the lead on eight minutes through Lee from close range, before Joe Pigott equalised for the away team with a header in the 28th minute from Anthony Wordsworth's cross. Collins restored Luton's lead on 39 minutes with a powerful header, before Steve Seddon scored AFC Wimbledon's equaliser in second-half stoppage time. Luton's final away match of the season ended in a 2–1 defeat to Burton Albion, resulting in the team only being above second-placed Barnsley on goal difference. Collins gave Luton a 30th-minute lead from close range, before Burton scored twice in the second half through Lucas Akins. Luton were promoted to the Championship after Portsmouth were defeated 3–2 at home to Peterborough and Sunderland lost 2–1 away to Fleetwood. Graeme Jones was appointed as manager two days later, officially taking charge on 7 May 2019. Moncur scored a 25-yard free kick to give Luton a third-minute lead in their last match of the season at home to Oxford United, and Lee scored early in the second half to make the score 2–0. Luke Garbutt brought Oxford back into the match on 60 minutes, before Moncur restored Luton's two-goal advantage in the 73rd minute from close range, meaning the match ended in a 3–1 win. This meant Luton won the League One title and finished three points clear of second-placed Barnsley.

== Competitions ==
=== EFL League One ===
EFL League One match details
Date	League position	Opponents	Venue	Result	Score F–A	Scorers	Attendance	Ref.
4 August 2018	21st	Portsmouth	A	L	0–1		19,018	
11 August 2018	19th	Sunderland	H	D	1–1	Pearson 68'	10,059	
18 August 2018	22nd	Peterborough United	A	L	1–3	Hylton 78'	8,016	
21 August 2018	15th	Southend United	H	W	2–0	Lee 2', Hylton 33' pen.	9,086	
25 August 2018	10th	Shrewsbury Town	H	W	3–2	Grant 51', Stacey 73', Lee 76'	8,518	
1 September 2018	9th	Wycombe Wanderers	A	D	1–1	Pearson 68'	6,072	
8 September 2018	11th	Doncaster Rovers	A	L	1–2	Lee 45+1'	7,526	
15 September 2018	11th	Bristol Rovers	H	W	1–0	Shinnie 62'	8,912	
22 September 2018	12th	Blackpool	A	D	0–0		4,124	
29 September 2018	12th	Charlton Athletic	H	D	2–2	Cornick 74', Collins 81'	9,502	
2 October 2018	10th	Oxford United	A	W	2–1	Collins 55', Potts 90+8'	6,769	
6 October 2018	8th	Scunthorpe United	H	W	3–2	Cornick 10', Lee 26', Justin 85'	8,682	
13 October 2018	10th	Barnsley	A	L	2–3	Collins (2) 45+3' pen., 86'	12,688	
20 October 2018	7th	Walsall	H	W	2–0	Rea 20', Grant 55'	8,953	
23 October 2018	6th	Accrington Stanley	H	W	4–1	Hylton (3) 5', 54', 70', Shinnie 53'	8,454	
27 October 2018	5th	AFC Wimbledon	A	W	2–0	Mpanzu 61', Lee 80'	4,202	
3 November 2018	5th	Rochdale	A	D	0–0		3,689	
17 November 2018	5th	Plymouth Argyle	H	W	5–1	Collins (3) 12', 45+1' pen., 77', Lee 23', Justin 29'	10,004	
24 November 2018	4th	Gillingham	A	W	3–1	Shinnie 25', Lee (2) 55', 68'	5,671	
27 November 2018	3rd	Bradford City	H	W	4–0	Justin 28', Lee (2) 33', 38', Cornick 89'	8,568	
8 December 2018	2nd	Fleetwood Town	H	W	2–0	Cornick 11', Morgan 80' o.g.	8,528	
15 December 2018	2nd	Coventry City	A	W	2–1	Pearson 38', Collins 57'	12,559	
22 December 2018	2nd	Burton Albion	H	W	2–0	Stacey 17', Collins 73' pen.	9,538	
26 December 2018	2nd	Scunthorpe United	A	W	2–0	Shinnie 37', Cornick 50'	4,050	
29 December 2018	2nd	Walsall	A	D	2–2	Collins 72', LuaLua 90+4'	5,739	
1 January 2019	2nd	Barnsley	H	D	0–0		9,926	
12 January 2019	2nd	Sunderland	A	D	1–1	Collins 67' pen.	37,791	
19 January 2019	2nd	Peterborough United	H	W	4–0	Collins (3) 8', 27', 53', Berry 66'	10,055	
26 January 2019	1st	Southend United	A	W	1–0	Pearson 29'	8,460	
29 January 2019	1st	Portsmouth	H	W	3–2	Collins (2) 39', 77' pen., Moncur 86'	10,078	
2 February 2019	1st	Shrewsbury Town	A	W	3–0	Collins (2) 30', 69', Pearson 53'	6,859	
9 February 2019	1st	Wycombe Wanderers	H	W	3–0	Collins 33', Moncur (2) 85', 88'	10,072	
16 February 2019	1st	Fleetwood Town	A	W	2–1	Moncur 41', Mpanzu 49'	3,651	
24 February 2019	1st	Coventry City	H	D	1–1	Pearson 16'	9,810	
2 March 2019	1st	Rochdale	H	W	2–0	Hylton 59', Collins 90+1'	9,905	
9 March 2019	1st	Plymouth Argyle	A	D	0–0		11,081	
12 March 2019	1st	Bradford City	A	W	1–0	Stacey 16'	15,992	
16 March 2019	1st	Gillingham	H	D	2–2	Hylton 45', Stacey 67'	9,963	
23 March 2019	1st	Doncaster Rovers	H	W	4–0	Mpanzu 33', Hylton 57', LuaLua 82', Berry 90+2'	10,071	
30 March 2019	1st	Bristol Rovers	A	W	2–1	Collins 17', Berry 39'	9,037	
6 April 2019	1st	Blackpool	H	D	2–2	Collins 6', Cummings 86'	10,028	
13 April 2019	1st	Charlton Athletic	A	L	1–3	Cornick 15'	16,449	
20 April 2019	1st	Accrington Stanley	A	W	3–0	Collins 24' pen., Mpanzu (2) 68', 87'	3,271	
23 April 2019	1st	AFC Wimbledon	H	D	2–2	Lee 8', Collins 39'	10,070	
27 April 2019	1st	Burton Albion	A	L	1–2	Collins 30'	4,903	
4 May 2019	1st	Oxford United	H	W	3–1	Moncur (2) 3', 73', Lee 53'	10,089	

==== League table ====
Pos	Team	Pld	W	D	L	GF	GA	GD	Pts	Promotion, qualification or relegation
1	Luton Town (C, P)	46	27	13	6	90	42	+48	94	Promotion to the EFL Championship
2	Barnsley (P)	46	26	13	7	80	39	+41	91	Promotion to the EFL Championship
3	Charlton Athletic (O, P)	46	26	10	10	73	40	+33	88	Qualification for League One play-offs (Note: Four teams play for one spot and promotion to the EFL Championship.)
4	Portsmouth	46	25	13	8	83	51	+32	88	Qualification for League One play-offs
5	Sunderland	46	22	19	5	80	47	+33	85	Qualification for League One play-offs

Source: EFL Official Website
Rules for classification: 1) Points; 2) Goal difference; 3) Number of goals scored; 4) Head-to-head results
(C) Champions; (O) Play-off winners; (P) Promoted

=== FA Cup ===
FA Cup match details
Round	Date	Opponents	Venue	Result	Score F–A	Scorers	Attendance	Ref.
First round	10 November 2018	Wycombe Wanderers	H	W	2–0	Shinnie 41', Cornick 71'	5,343	
Second round	2 December 2018	Bury	A	W	1–0	Cornick 42'	2,977	
Third round	5 January 2019	Sheffield Wednesday	A	D	0–0		16,974	
Third round replay	15 January 2019	Sheffield Wednesday	H	L	0–1		9,259	

=== EFL Cup ===
EFL Cup match details
Round	Date	Opponents	Venue	Result	Score F–A	Scorers	Attendance	Ref.
First round	14 August 2018	West Bromwich Albion	A	L	0–1		10,404	

=== EFL Trophy ===
EFL Trophy match details
Round	Date	Opponents	Venue	Result	Score F–A	Scorers	Attendance	Ref.
Southern Group H	4 September 2018	Brighton & Hove Albion U21	H	W	2–1	Jarvis 5', Grant 79'	1,318	
Southern Group H	9 October 2018	Milton Keynes Dons	H	W	3–0	Sheehan 17' pen., LuaLua 29', Grant 60'	875	
Southern Group H	13 November 2018	Peterborough United	A	L	1–2	O'Malley 73' o.g.	2,017	
Second round	5 December 2018	Southend United	H	D	1–1; 2–4 pens.	Read 81'	1,545	

==== First round (Southern Section Group H) ====
Pos	Lge	Team	Pld	W	PW	PL	L	GF	GA	GD	Pts	Qualification
1	L1	Luton Town	3	2	0	0	1	6	3	+3	6	Round 2
2	L1	Peterborough United	3	1	0	2	0	7	6	+1	5	Round 2
3	ACA	Brighton & Hove Albion U21	3	1	1	0	1	6	6	0	5	
4	L2	Milton Keynes Dons	3	0	1	0	2	5	9	−4	2	

Source: Sky Sports

== Transfers ==
=== In ===
Date	Player	Club†	Fee	Ref.
1 June 2018	Andrew Shinnie	(Birmingham City)	Free	
26 June 2018	Matty Pearson	Barnsley	Undisclosed	
1 July 2018	Sonny Bradley	(Plymouth Argyle)	Free	
26 September 2018	Kazenga LuaLua	(Sunderland)	Free	
18 January 2019	George Moncur	Barnsley	Undisclosed	

† Brackets around club names indicate the player's contract with that club had expired before he joined Luton.

=== Out ===
Date	Player	Club†	Fee	Ref.
1 July 2018	Jordan Cook	(Grimsby Town)	Released	
1 July 2018	Kavan Cotter		Released	
1 July 2018	Scott Cuthbert	(Stevenage)	Released	
1 July 2018	Lawson D'Ath	(Milton Keynes Dons)	Released	
1 July 2018	Olly Lee	(Heart of Midlothian)	Free	
1 July 2018	Johnny Mullins	(Cheltenham Town)	Released	
29 January 2019	Akin Famewo	Norwich City	Undisclosed	
28 June 2019	James Justin	Leicester City	Undisclosed	

† Brackets around club names indicate the player joined that club after his Luton contract expired.

=== Loan in ===
Date	Player	Club	Return	Ref.
6 July 2018	Jorge Grant	Nottingham Forest	Terminated early 7 January 2019	
31 August 2018	Eunan O'Kane	Leeds United	10 January 2019	
7 January 2019	George Thorne	Derby County	End of season	
31 January 2019	Alex Baptiste	Queens Park Rangers	End of season	
31 January 2019	Aaron Connolly	Brighton & Hove Albion	End of season	
31 January 2019	Jason Cummings	Nottingham Forest	End of season	

=== Loan out ===
Date	Player	Club	Return	Ref.
6 July 2018	Akin Famewo	Grimsby Town	Recalled 29 January 2019	
31 August 2018	Luke Gambin	Crawley Town	End of season	
31 August 2018	Jake Jervis	AFC Wimbledon	End of season	
26 October 2018	Frankie Musonda	Oxford City	One month	
14 December 2018	Connor Tomlinson	Hemel Hempstead Town	One month	
24 December 2018	Drew Richardson	Harlow Town	One month	
9 January 2019	Frankie Musonda	Hemel Hempstead Town	End of season	
19 January 2019	Jack James	Havant & Waterlooville	One month	
23 January 2019	Toby Byron	Hitchin Town	One month	
31 January 2019	Aaron Jarvis	Falkirk	End of season	
31 January 2019	Lloyd Jones	Plymouth Argyle	End of season	
31 January 2019	Jack Senior	Harrogate Town	End of season	
22 February 2019	Arthur Read	Hemel Hempstead Town	One month	
15 March 2019	Tiernan Parker	Hitchin Town	Work experience	

== Appearances and goals ==
Numbers in parentheses denote appearances as substitute.
Players with names struck through and marked † left the club during the playing season.
Players with names in italics and marked * were on loan from another club for the whole of their season with Luton.
Players listed with no appearances have been in the matchday squad but only as unused substitutes.
Key to positions: GK – Goalkeeper; DF – Defender; MF – Midfielder; FW – Forward

Players included in matchday squads
No.	Pos.	Nat.	Name	League		FA Cup		EFL Cup		EFL Trophy		Total		Discipline	
No.	Pos.	Nat.	Name	Apps	Goals	Apps	Goals	Apps	Goals	Apps	Goals	Apps	Goals	A yellow rectangle, denoting the yellow penalty card shown to a player being cautioned	A red rectangle, denoting the red penalty card shown to a player being sent off
1	GK	CZE	Marek Štěch	5	0	0	0	0	0	2	0	7	0	0	0
2	DF	ENG	James Justin	35 (8)	3	4	0	1	0	2 (2)	0	42 (10)	3	1	0
3	DF	ENG	Dan Potts	15 (9)	1	0 (2)	0	0	0	1	0	16 (11)	1	5	0
4	MF	IRL	Alan McCormack	17 (2)	0	1	0	0	0	3	0	21 (2)	0	9 (Note: McCormack was booked against Accrington Stanley on 23 October, despite not making an appearance in the match.)	0
5	DF	ENG	Sonny Bradley	44 (1)	0	4	0	1	0	0	0	49 (1)	0	4	0
6	DF	ENG	Matty Pearson	46	6	4	0	1	0	1	0	52	6	2	0
7	DF	ENG	Jack Stacey	45	4	4	0	1	0	0	0	50	4	3	0
8	MF	ENG	Luke Berry	12 (9)	3	2	0	0 (1)	0	0	0	14 (10)	3	3	0
9	FW	ENG	Danny Hylton	18 (7)	8	1 (1)	0	0	0	1	0	20 (8)	8	4	2
10	FW	ENG	Elliot Lee	36 (2)	12	4	0	0 (1)	0	0	0	40 (3)	12	4	0
11	MF	SCO	Andrew Shinnie	39 (2)	4	4	1	1	0	1	0	45 (2)	5	9	1
12	DF	ENG	Alex Baptiste *	0 (2)	0	0	0	0	0	0	0	0 (2)	0	0	0
14	FW	ENG	Harry Cornick	14 (18)	6	2	2	1	0	2	0	19 (18)	8	0	0
15	FW	ENG	Jake Jervis	0 (2)	0	0	0	1	0	0	0	1 (2)	0	0	0
16	DF	IRL	Glen Rea	20 (2)	1	2	0	1	0	1 (1)	0	24 (3)	1	5	0
17	MF	ENG	Pelly Ruddock Mpanzu	46	5	3 (1)	0	1	0	0 (1)	0	50 (2)	5	6	0
18	MF	ENG	~~Jorge Grant~~ * †	13 (4)	2	0 (1)	0	0	0	4	2	17 (5)	4	2	0
18	FW	IRL	Aaron Connolly *	0 (2)	0	0	0	0	0	0	0	0 (2)	0	0	0
19	FW	IRL	James Collins	42 (2)	25	4	0	0	0	0	0	46 (2)	25	10	1
20	MF	ENG	George Moncur	4 (10)	6	0	0	0	0	0	0	4 (10)	6	1	0
21	DF	ENG	Jack Senior	0	0	0	0	0	0	3	0	3	0	1	0
22	MF	MLT	Luke Gambin	0	0	0	0	1	0	0	0	1	0	0	0
23	FW	AUS	Jason Cummings *	0 (5)	1	0	0	0	0	0	0	0 (5)	1	0	0
24	MF	ENG	George Thorne *	0 (3)	0	0	0	0	0	0	0	0 (3)	0	0	0
25	MF	DRC	Kazenga LuaLua	10 (12)	2	1 (2)	0	0	0	3	1	14 (14)	3	3	0
27	FW	ENG	Aaron Jarvis	0 (4)	0	0 (2)	0	0	0	4	1	4 (6)	1	0	0
28	DF	ENG	Lloyd Jones	0 (1)	0	0	0	0 (1)	0	3	0	3 (2)	0	1	0
32	MF	IRL	~~Eunan O'Kane~~ * †	0 (3)	0	0	0	0	0	1	0	1 (3)	0	0	0
34	DF	IRL	Jack James	0	0	0	0	0	0	1	0	1	0	0	0
35	MF	ENG	Arthur Read	0	0	0	0	0	0	4	1	4	1	0	0
36	GK	ENG	James Shea	41	0	4	0	1	0	0	0	46	0	1	0
37	DF	ENG	Frankie Musonda	0	0	0	0	0	0	1 (1)	0	1 (1)	0	0	0
40	GK	ENG	Harry Isted	0	0	0	0	0	0	2	0	2	0	0	0
41	MF	ENG	Jake Peck	0	0	0	0	0	0	0 (1)	0	0 (1)	0	0	0
44	DF	IRL	Alan Sheehan	4 (13)	0	0	0	0	0	4	1	8 (13)	1	2	0
45	DF	ENG	Corey Panter	0	0	0	0	0	0	0	0	0	0	0	0
47	FW	ENG	Connor Tomlinson	0	0	0	0	0	0	0 (1)	0	0 (1)	0	0	0
48	FW	ENG	Josh Neufville	0	0	0	0	0	0	0 (3)	0	0 (3)	0	0	0
49	MF	ENG	Drew Richardson	0	0	0	0	0	0	0	0	0	0	0	0

Players not included in matchday squads
No.	Pos.	Nat.	Name
39	DF	ENG	~~Akin Famewo~~ †
