= Jack James (footballer, born 2000) =

English footballer

Personal information
- Full name: Jack Alexander James
- Date of birth: 26 January 2000 (age 26)
- Place of birth: Bedford, England
- Position: Defender

Team information
- Current team: St Albans City
- Number: 2

Youth career
- –2017: Luton Town

Senior career*
Years	Team	Apps	(Gls)
2017–2019	Luton Town	0	(0)
2018	→ Hitchin Town (loan)	6	(0)
2019	→ Havant & Waterlooville (loan)	7	(0)
2019	Braintree Town	8	(1)
2019–2023	Gloucester City	67	(3)
2023–	St Albans City	100	(3)

International career^{‡}
2018	Republic of Ireland U18	2	(0)
2018–2019	Republic of Ireland U19	7	(0)
- * Club domestic league appearances and goals as of 16:45 4 May 2023 (UTC) ‡ National team caps and goals as of 15:26, 14 October 2019 (UTC)

Jack Alexander James (born 26 January 2000) is a professional footballer who plays as a defender for Isthmian Premier Division club St. Albans City.

== Club career ==
James made his first-team debut for Luton Town as a half-time substitute for James Justin against Tottenham Hotspur U21s in an EFL Trophy group stage match on 15 August 2017, which the team won with a 4–2 penalty shoot-out victory following a 2–2 draw after normal time. He signed his first professional contract with the club at the end of the 2017–18 season.

In January 2018, James was loaned out to Hitchin Town for one month. His first start for Luton Town came on 13 November 2018 in a 2–1 defeat to Peterborough United in the EFL Trophy.

On 19 January 2019, he was loaned out to Havant & Waterlooville on a one-month youth loan. On 15 February, the loan was extended until the end of the season.

On 12 October 2019, James joined National League South side, Braintree Town.

On 20 December 2019, James transferred to National League North Club Gloucester City

== International career ==
James is eligible to represent the Republic of Ireland at international level. He was called into the Republic of Ireland under-18 squad in March 2018, playing in two games.

James was later called up to the Republic of Ireland under-19 squad ahead of three qualifying matches for the 2019 UEFA European Under-19 Championship in October 2018. He played at left-back in all three games as Ireland topped their group.

== Career statistics ==
As of match played 18 January 2020

Appearances and goals by club, season and competition
Club	Season	League			FA Cup		EFL Cup		Other		Total	
Club	Season	Division	Apps	Goals	Apps	Goals	Apps	Goals	Apps	Goals	Apps	Goals
Luton Town	2017–18	League Two	0	0	0	0	0	0	1 (Note: Appearance(s) in EFL Trophy)	0	1	0
Luton Town	2018–19	League One	0	0	0	0	0	0	1	0	1	0
Luton Town	Total		0	0	0	0	0	0	2	0	2	0
Hitchin Town (loan)	2017–18	Southern League Premier Division	6	0	0	0	—		1 (Note: Appearance(s) in Southern League Cup)	0	7	0
Havant & Waterlooville (loan)	2018–19	National League	7	0	0	0	—		0	0	7	0
Braintree Town	2019–20	National League South	8	1	0	0	—		1 (Note: Appearance(s) in FA Trophy)	0	9	1
Gloucester City	2019–20	National League North	4	1	—		—		—		4	1
Career total			25	2	0	0	0	0	4	0	29	2
