= Danny Hylton =

English footballer (born 1989)

- Hylton in 2026

Personal information
- Full name: Daniel Thomas Hylton
- Date of birth: 25 February 1989 (age 37)
- Place of birth: Camden, England
- Height: 5 ft 11 in (1.81 m)
- Position: Striker

Team information
- Current team: Charlton Athletic (set piece and first-team coach)

Youth career
- 2005–2006: Aldershot Town

Senior career*
Years	Team	Apps	(Gls)
2006–2013	Aldershot Town	178	(35)
2007	→ Harlow Town (loan)	1	(0)
2013–2014	Rotherham United	1	(0)
2013	→ Bury (loan)	7	(2)
2014	→ AFC Wimbledon (loan)	17	(3)
2014–2016	Oxford United	85	(26)
2016–2022	Luton Town	147	(54)
2022–2024	Northampton Town	30	(0)
2024–2025	Charlton Athletic	6	(1)
Total		472	(121)
- * Club domestic league appearances and goals

Daniel Thomas Hylton (born 25 February 1989) is an English former professional footballer who played as a striker. He is a set piece and first-team coach at Charlton Athletic.

== Career ==
=== Aldershot Town ===
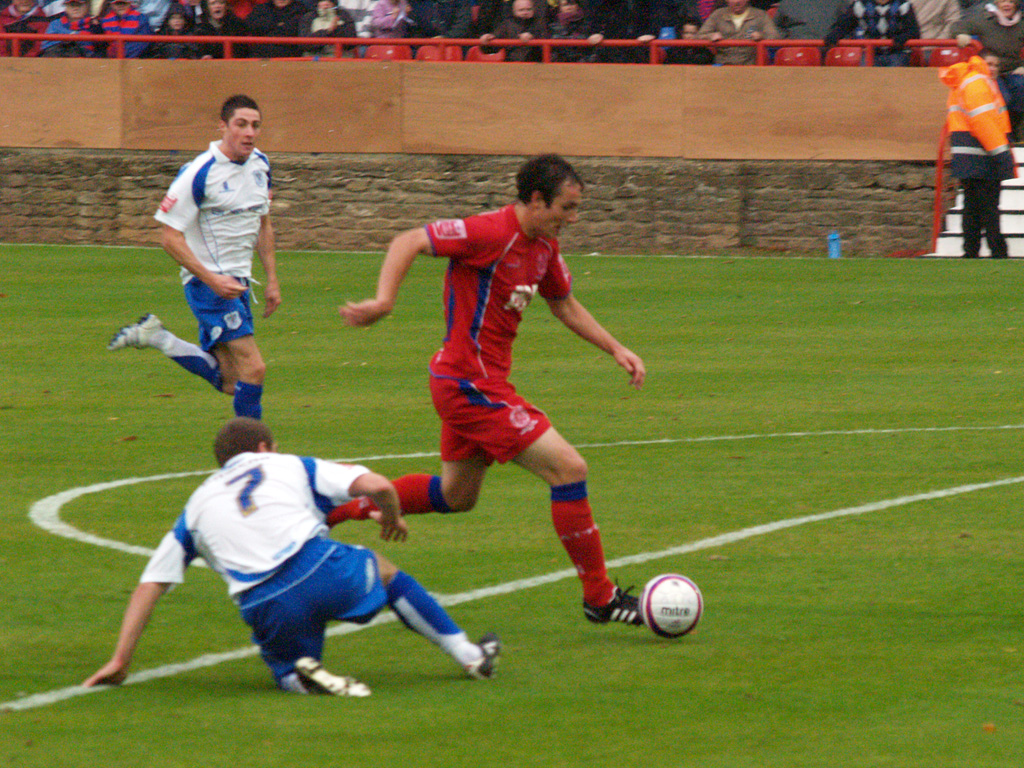
Hylton (right) playing for Aldershot Town in 2008.

Born in Camden, Greater London, Hylton joined Aldershot Town aged 16 in 2005, when he was signed by Terry Brown. During the 2007–08 season, Hylton was part of the team which won the Conference Premier title and the Conference League Cup. Among his appearances, Hylton played in their first League Cup match, when he came on as a 69th-minute substitute for Marvin Morgan in a 3–1 defeat to Coventry City on 13 August 2008.

In March 2007, Hylton joined Harlow Town on loan before he sustained an injury on his debut, making one appearance as a result.

On 6 January 2011, it was reported Hylton had agreed to sign for AFC Wimbledon. However, he later signed a one-year contract extension to remain with Aldershot under new manager Dean Holdsworth.

=== Rotherham United ===
On 18 June 2013, Hylton signed a two-year contract with newly promoted League One club Rotherham United, with the option of a third year. He made his Rotherham debut in a 1–0 win away to Brentford on 5 October. Ten days later, Hylton was loaned out to League Two club Bury until 23 November.

On 27 January 2014, Hylton joined AFC Wimbledon on loan for the remainder of the 2013–14 season. Rotherham were promoted to the Championship at the end of the season, and Hylton was transfer-listed.

=== Oxford United ===
Hylton joined League Two club Oxford United on a two-year contract on 6 June 2014. He ended the 2014–15 season as Oxford's top goalscorer with 16 goals in all competitions, 14 of which came in the league. On 3 April 2016, he scored Oxford's second goal in the 2016 Football League Trophy Final at Wembley Stadium, which Oxford lost 3–2 to Barnsley.

=== Luton Town ===
Hylton turned down a new contract with Oxford to sign for League Two club Luton Town on a two-year contract on 31 May 2016. He scored the opening goal on his debut in Luton's 3–0 win away to Plymouth Argyle on the opening day of 2016–17. Hylton scored a hat-trick for Luton in a 4–1 win at home to Wycombe Wanderers on 3 September, which saw him earn a place in the English Football League Team of the Week. He scored twice from the penalty spot for Luton in a 3–1 victory away to Exeter City in the FA Cup first round, ensuring their progression to the second round. Hylton signed a contract extension with Luton on 12 January 2017 until June 2019, with the prospect of a further extension until 2020, having scored 14 goals from 26 appearances up to that point in 2016–17. He scored twice during a home match against Crawley Town on 11 February, the first coming in the 70th minute and the second coming in the 76th minute, which made the score 2–1 to Luton, and was once again named in the English Football League Team of the Week. Hylton was named the PFA Fans' League Two Player of the Month for February 2017, during which he scored four goals in five league appearances. His performances for Luton saw him named in the PFA League Two Team of the Year, as well as being named Luton Town Player of the Season, voted for by the club's supporters. Hylton played in both legs of Luton's play-off semi-final defeat to Blackpool, which finished 6–5 on aggregate, and scored a penalty in the 3–3 home draw in the second leg. He finished the season with 47 appearances and 27 goals.

Ahead of 2017–18, Hylton had an operation on his lower leg which saw him miss the start of the season. His first appearance of the season came against Tottenham Hotspur U21 in an EFL Trophy group stage match on 15 August 2017, in which he was substituted at half-time. Hylton scored his first goal of 2017–18 in his 50th appearance for Luton with the equaliser away to Mansfield Town 11 days later, which finished a 2–2 draw. He was named the PFA Fans' League Two Player of the Month for October 2017, having scored four goals from five league appearances.

His contract was extended by a further year at the end of the 2017–18 season after a promotion clause was triggered as a result of Luton's promotion to League One.

=== Northampton Town ===
Hylton signed a two-year contract with League Two club Northampton Town on 21 June 2022 effective from 1 July when his Luton contract expired, making 28 appearances in all competitions in the 2022–23 season as the Cobblers won promotion from League Two.

He was released by the club upon the expiration of his contract at the end of the 2023–24 season, after making only four appearances, totaling at 32 appearances and zero goals across his time with the Cobblers.

=== Charlton Athletic ===
On 18 September 2024, Hylton signed for Charlton Athletic as a player-coach on a short-term deal reuniting him with his former manager Nathan Jones.

On 26 October 2024, Hylton made his debut for Charlton Athletic, coming on in the 81st minute of a 2–2 draw in League One with Wrexham at The Valley. In doing so, Hylton became the 1,000th player to play for Charlton in a professional game.

On 28 January 2025, it was confirmed that Hylton's contract had expired but that he would continue to train with the men's first-team squad.

On 24 February 2025, it was confirmed that Hylton had extended his player-coach contract with the club. On 30 May 2025, it was confirmed Hylton's playing contract at the club would not be renewed following the conclusion of his contract, but he would sign a contract to continue as part of Nathan Jones' backroom staff.

On 19 June 2025, Hylton announced his retirement from professional football but that he will continue at the club as part of Nathan Jones' backroom staff.

== Career statistics ==
As of matches played 21 April 2025

Appearances and goals by club, season and competition
Club	Season	League			FA Cup		League Cup		Other		Total	
Club	Season	Division	Apps	Goals	Apps	Goals	Apps	Goals	Apps	Goals	Apps	Goals
Aldershot Town	2005–06	Conference National	0	0	0	0	—		1 (Note: Appearance(s) in Hampshire Senior Cup)	0	1	0
Aldershot Town	2006–07	Conference National	1	0	1	0	—		6	5	8	5
Aldershot Town	2007–08	Conference Premier	23	5	2	0	—		12 (Note: Five appearances in FA Trophy, four appearances and one goal in Conference League Cup, two in Hampshire Senior Cup)	1	37	6
Aldershot Town	2008–09	League Two	29	5	2	0	1	0	1 (Note: Appearance(s) in Football League Trophy)	0	33	5
Aldershot Town	2009–10	League Two	21	3	1	0	1	0	1	0	24	3
Aldershot Town	2010–11	League Two	33	5	3	0	1	0	2	1	39	6
Aldershot Town	2011–12	League Two	44	13	3	0	4	2	1	1	52	16
Aldershot Town	2012–13	League Two	27	4	4	8	0	0	1	0	32	12
Aldershot Town	Total		178	35	16	8	7	2	25	8	226	53
Harlow Town (loan)	2006–07	Isthmian League Division One North	1	0	—		—		—		1	0
Rotherham United	2013–14	League One	1	0	—		0	0	1	0	2	0
Bury (loan)	2013–14	League Two	7	2	2	0	—		—		9	2
AFC Wimbledon (loan)	2013–14	League Two	17	3	—		—		—		17	3
Oxford United	2014–15	League Two	44	14	2	0	2	2	1	0	49	16
Oxford United	2015–16	League Two	41	12	4	0	2	1	5	1	52	14
Oxford United	Total		85	26	6	0	4	3	6	1	101	30
Luton Town	2016–17	League Two	39	21	2	3	2	0	4 (Note: Two appearances and two goals in EFL Trophy, two appearances and one goal in League Two play-offs)	3	47	27
Luton Town	2017–18	League Two	39	21	3	2	0	0	1 (Note: Appearance in EFL Trophy)	0	43	23
Luton Town	2018–19	League One	25	8	2	0	0	0	1	0	28	8
Luton Town	2019–20	Championship	11	0	0	0	0	0	—		11	0
Luton Town	2020–21	Championship	16	0	1	0	2	0	—		19	0
Luton Town	2021–22	Championship	17	4	3	0	0	0	2 (Note: Appearances in Championship play-offs)	0	22	4
Luton Town	Total		147	54	11	5	4	0	8	3	170	62
Northampton Town	2022–23	League Two	26	0	0	0	1	0	1	0	28	0
Northampton Town	2023–24	League One	4	0	0	0	0	0	0	0	4	0
Northampton Town	Total		30	0	0	0	1	0	1	0	32	0
Charlton Athletic	2024–25	League One	6	1	2	0	—		2	0	10	1
Career total			472	121	37	13	16	5	43	12	568	151

== Honours ==
Aldershot Town

- Conference League Cup: 2007–08
- Conference Premier: 2007–08

Oxford United

- Football League Trophy runner-up: 2015–16
- Football League Two second-place promotion: 2015–16

Luton Town

- EFL League Two second-place promotion: 2017–18
- EFL League One: 2018–19

Individual

- PFA Fans' League Two Player of the Month: February 2017, October 2017
- PFA Team of the Year: 2016–17 League Two, 2017–18 League Two
- Luton Town Player of the Season: 2016–17
