= Harry Isted =

English footballer (born 1997)

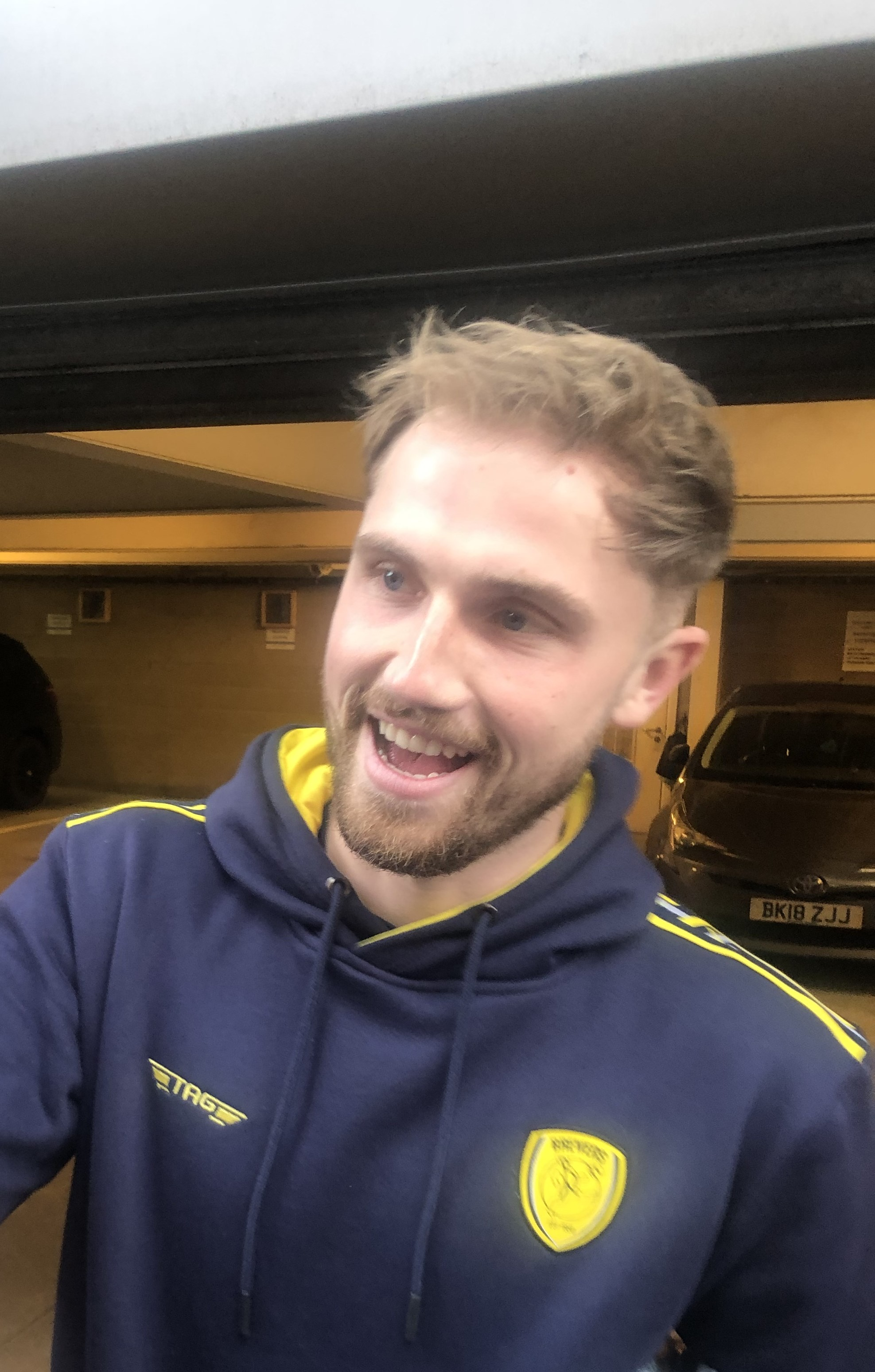
- Isted in 2024.

Personal information
- Full name: Harvey James Duke Isted
- Date of birth: 5 March 1997 (age 29)
- Place of birth: Chichester, England
- Height: 6 ft 1 in (1.86 m)
- Position: Goalkeeper

Team information
- Current team: Altrincham

Youth career
- Southampton
- 2016–2017: Stoke City

Senior career*
Years	Team	Apps	(Gls)
2017–2023	Luton Town	3	(0)
2018	→ Chesham United (loan)	7	(0)
2019	→ Oxford City (loan)	4	(0)
2019–2020	→ Wealdstone (loan)	10	(0)
2020	→ Wealdstone (loan)	11	(0)
2021	→ Wealdstone (loan)	12	(0)
2023	→ Barnsley (loan)	19	(0)
2023–2024	Charlton Athletic	21	(0)
2024–2025	Burton Albion	3	(0)
2025–2026	Forest Green Rovers	29	(0)
2026–	Altrincham	0	(0)
- * Club domestic league appearances and goals as of 12:15, 8 October 2026 (UTC)

Harvey James Duke Isted (born 5 March 1997) is an English professional footballer who plays as a goalkeeper for Altrincham.

He has also played for Southampton, Stoke City, Luton Town, Chesham United, Oxford City, Wealdstone, Barnsley, Charlton Athletic and Burton Albion.

== Early and personal life ==
Isted was born in Chichester, West Sussex and attended Chichester High School For Boys.

== Career ==
Isted joined League Two side Luton Town on 27 July 2017 following his release from Stoke City. He made his debut for the club over a year later in a 2–1 EFL Trophy victory over Brighton & Hove Albion U21.

In September 2019 he moved on loan to National League South club Oxford City for one month, keeping a clean sheet on his debut. In November 2019 he moved on loan to Wealdstone, also in the National League South. Having won promotion to the National League in his first season at the club, he re-joined Wealdstone on loan in September 2020. However, on 30 November 2020, Isted was recalled by Luton following an injury to fellow goalkeeper Simon Sluga. On 30 January 2021, Isted re-joined Wealdstone on loan for a third time.

Isted made his first appearance for Luton since 2018 in a 3–2 loss to Premier League side Chelsea in the FA Cup on 2 March 2022, coming on as an early substitute for the injured Jed Steer and winning praise for his performance. He made his league debut for Luton on 18 April 2022, almost five years since first joining the club, again coming on as a substitute after an injury to James Shea in a 1–0 Championship victory over Cardiff City. Five days later, Isted made his first start of the season and his first league start in a Luton shirt in the 1–1 home draw against Blackpool.

He moved on loan to Barnsley in January 2023.

On 24 June 2023, Isted agreed to join Charlton Athletic on a two-year deal when his contract at Luton Town expires at the end of June 2023.

On 27 July 2024, Isted joined Burton Albion on a three-year deal for an undisclosed fee.

On 7 November 2025, Isted was released by Burton Albion, and immediately signed by Forest Green Rovers. On 8 May 2026, the club announced it was releasing the player.

He signed for Altrincham in September 2026.

== Career statistics ==
As of match played 29 April 2026

Appearances and goals by club, season and competition
Club	Season	League			FA Cup		EFL Cup		Other		Total	
Club	Season	Division	Apps	Goals	Apps	Goals	Apps	Goals	Apps	Goals	Apps	Goals
Stoke City U23	2016–17	—			—		—		1 (Note: Appearance(s) in EFL Trophy)	0	1	0
Luton Town	2017–18	League Two	0	0	0	0	0	0	0	0	0	0
Luton Town	2018–19	League One	0	0	0	0	0	0	2	0	2	0
Luton Town	2019–20	Championship	0	0	0	0	0	0	—		0	0
Luton Town	2020–21	Championship	0	0	0	0	0	0	—		0	0
Luton Town	2021–22	Championship	2	0	1	0	0	0	0	0	3	0
Luton Town	2022–23	Championship	1	0	0	0	0	0	0	0	1	0
Luton Town	Total		3	0	1	0	0	0	2	0	6	0
Chesham United (loan)	2017–18	Southern League Premier Division	7	0	—		—		—		7	0
Oxford City (loan)	2019–20	National League South	4	0	—		—		—		4	0
Wealdstone (loan)	2019–20	National League South	10	0	—		—		—		10	0
Wealdstone (loan)	2020–21	National League	23	0	—		—		—		23	0
Barnsley (loan)	2022–23	League One	19	0	0	0	0	0	3 (Note: Appearances in the play-offs.)	0	22	0
Charlton Athletic	2023–24	League One	21	0	0	0	1	0	1	0	23	0
Burton Albion	2024–25	League One	3	0	1	0	0	0	4	0	8	0
Burton Albion	2025–26	League One	0	0	0	0	0	0	0	0	0	0
Burton Albion	Total		3	0	1	0	0	0	4	0	8	0
Forest Green Rovers	2025–26	National League	29	0	0	0	—		1 (Note: Appearance in the play-offs.)	0	30	0
Career total			119	0	2	0	1	0	12	0	134	0
