= Elliot Lee =

English footballer (born 1994)

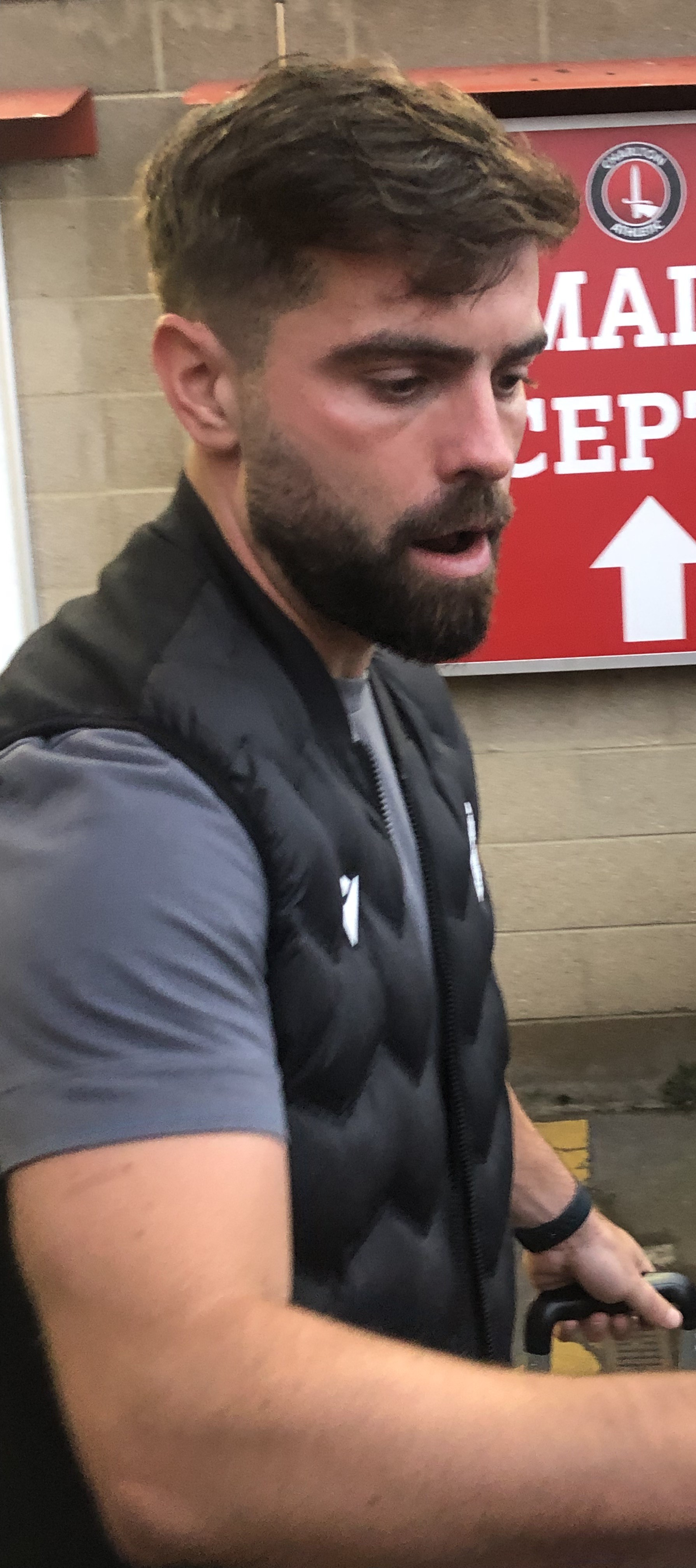
- Lee in 2024.

Personal information
- Full name: Elliot Robert Lee
- Date of birth: 16 December 1994 (age 31)
- Place of birth: Durham, England
- Height: 5 ft 10 in (1.77 m)
- Position: Attacking midfielder

Youth career
- –2012: West Ham United

Senior career*
Years	Team	Apps	(Gls)
2012–2016	West Ham United	2	(0)
2013	→ Colchester United (loan)	4	(1)
2014	→ Southend United (loan)	0	(0)
2015	→ Luton Town (loan)	11	(3)
2015–2016	→ Blackpool (loan)	4	(0)
2016	→ Colchester United (loan)	15	(2)
2016–2017	Barnsley	6	(0)
2017–2022	Luton Town	93	(24)
2021	→ Oxford United (loan)	18	(6)
2021–2022	→ Charlton Athletic (loan)	34	(3)
2022–2026	Wrexham	129	(36)
2026	→ Doncaster Rovers (loan)	18	(3)
- * Club domestic league appearances and goals as of 13:06, 1 September 2026 (UTC)

Elliot Robert Lee (born 16 December 1994) is an English professional footballer who plays as an attacking midfielder.

Lee started his career at West Ham United, where he was loaned to Colchester United, Southend United, Blackpool and Luton Town, before joining Barnsley in 2016 for an undisclosed fee. Lee left Barnsley after a year to sign for Luton and after five years with the club, signed for Wrexham. He is the son of former footballer Rob Lee and the younger brother of former footballer Olly Lee.

== Career ==
=== West Ham United ===
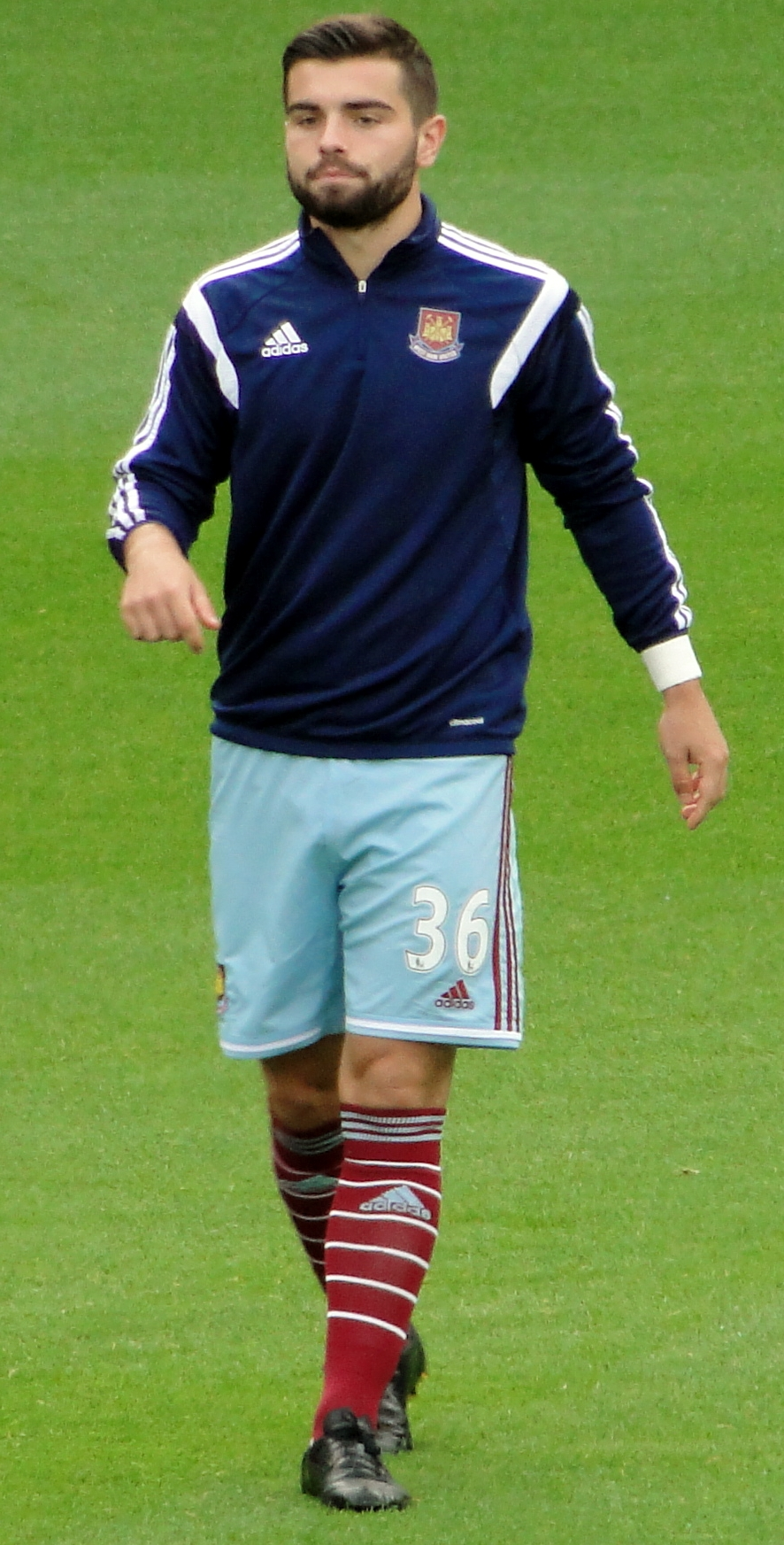
Lee warming up for West Ham United in 2014.

Born in Durham, Lee was a youth team player with West Ham United, making his debut for the reserve team in 2011 before signing his first professional contract in August 2012. His first appearance in a first-team squad was on 1 January 2013 when he was an unused substitute in a Premier League match against Norwich City. Lee then made his professional debut for West Ham, as a 78th-minute substitute for Ricardo Vaz Tê, on 16 January 2013 in a 1–0 defeat in the FA Cup third round replay at Old Trafford against Manchester United.

On 12 August 2013, Lee scored two first half goals for the West Ham development squad against Aston Villa Under-21s. On 31 August he made his Premier League debut for West Ham, coming on as an 88th-minute substitute for Mohammed Diamé in a 1–0 home defeat by Stoke City. Three weeks later, Lee scored a hat-trick against Newcastle Reserves in a 5–4 away win. He went on to score 11 matches that season for the development squad.

==== Loan to Colchester United ====
On 22 October 2013 he signed for Colchester United on a one-month youth loan. His only Colchester goal was scored on 2 November in an away draw against Rotherham United: in stoppage time in the second half, with Rotherham winning 2–1, Lee scored with a header which hit the bar and bounced over the line to make the final score 2–2. He returned to West Ham on 21 November after four appearances and one goal for Colchester United.

==== Loan to Southend United ====
On 31 October 2014 Lee joined Southend United on a three-month loan. Within hours of signing for Southend, Lee suffered a hamstring injury and returned to West Ham for treatment. On 5 November Lee was ruled out of playing for at least two months. His loan was cancelled on 6 November and he returned to West Ham United, his parent club.

==== Loan to Luton Town ====
On 19 February 2015, Lee joined Luton Town on loan for one month. Lee chose to wear the number 38 shirt in memory of his former teammate at West Ham, Dylan Tombides who also wore number 38. He scored on his debut for Luton two days later, four minutes after coming on as a substitute for Andy Drury in a 3–2 defeat away to AFC Wimbledon. On 24 March 2015, Lee scored twice in a 2–3 home defeat by Wycombe Wanderers. On scoring he revealed a T-shirt showing a picture of Tombides, to whom he dedicated his goals. The following day his loan contract with Luton was extended until the end of the 2014–15 season. Luton manager John Still said of Lee "Elliot's been fantastic for us and we're thrilled to have him for the rest of this season."

==== Return to West Ham ====
Lee scored another hat-trick for the development squad when they faced Conference Premier club Woking in a pre-season friendly on 5 August 2014. Lee was an unused substitute in the League Cup penalty shoot-out defeat by Sheffield United in the second round on 26 August 2014. He was given the number 36 for the first team the same day. On his first start for West Ham, on 9 July 2015, Lee scored his first goal for the club. In a Europa League first qualifying round match away against FC Lusitanos of Andorra, he scored the only goal from a cross from Matt Jarvis.

==== Loan to Blackpool ====
On 26 November 2015, Lee was loaned to League One club Blackpool until 3 January 2016. He made his debut two days later, as a half-time substitute for Bright Osayi-Samuel in a 1–0 win over local rivals Fleetwood Town at Bloomfield Road. In January 2016, having picked up an injury, Lee refused the offer of an extension to his loan and returned to West Ham. His refusal angered Blackpool manager, Neil McDonald, who was quoted as saying that Lee "would rather be at home with his mum and dad" than playing for Blackpool.

==== Second loan to Colchester United ====
On 18 January 2016, Lee signed on loan for Colchester United until the end of the 2015–16 season. He scored his first goal of his second spell on 12 March in a 3–3 draw with Wigan Athletic. He scored once more, making 15 appearances in total.

=== Barnsley ===
On 24 June 2016, Lee signed for Championship club Barnsley for an undisclosed fee. He made six appearances during the 2016–17 season, all as a substitute, but left the club by mutual consent on 4 July 2017.

=== Luton Town ===
Following his release from Barnsley on 4 July 2017, Lee signed for his former loan club Luton Town on a two-year contract. He scored in an 8–2 win over Yeovil Town on the opening day of the 2017–18 season on 5 August 2017.

His contract was extended by a further year at the end of the 2017–18 season after a promotion clause was triggered as a result of Luton's promotion to League One.

On 20 May 2022, it was announced that Lee would leave the club following the end of the 2021–22 season.

==== Loan to Oxford United ====
He joined Oxford United on loan until the end of the season on 1 February 2021. He scored six goals in eighteen appearances, all in League One.

==== Loan to Charlton Athletic ====
On 26 August 2021, Lee joined Charlton Athletic on a season-long loan for the 2021–22 campaign. He scored his first goal for Charlton in an EFL Trophy tie against Crawley Town on 31 August 2021.

=== Wrexham ===
On 8 July 2022, Lee signed a three-year deal with Wrexham. On 6 August 2022, Lee scored twice on his debut to help Wrexham come from behind to beat Eastleigh 2–1 He was named in the National League Team of the Year at the end of the 2022–23 season as Wrexham won the division. On 1 January 2024, Lee signed a contract extension with Wrexham, signing until the end of the 2026–27 season. Wrexham earned promotion as runners-up at the end of the 2023–24 season. Lee was nominated for the PFA League Two Player of the Year. He was also included in the PFA and EFL League Two Team of the Year.

Loan to Doncaster Rovers

On 2 February 2026, Lee joined League One side Doncaster Rovers on loan for the rest of the season. Lee then made his debut on 3 February 2026 in a 2-1 away win against Burton Albion.

On 21 March 2026, Lee scored the winner against his former club Barnsley, converting a second-half penalty to give Rovers a 1–0 win in the South Yorkshire derby at Oakwell.

On 1 September 2026 he departed the club after his contract was terminated by mutual consent.

== Personal life ==
He is the son of former Charlton Athletic, Newcastle United and England midfielder Rob Lee. His older brother, Olly, is also a former professional footballer.

He attended Brentwood School in Essex.

== Career statistics ==
As of end of 2025–26 season

Appearances and goals by club, season and competition
Club	Season	League			FA Cup		EFL Cup		Other		Total	
Club	Season	Division	Apps	Goals	Apps	Goals	Apps	Goals	Apps	Goals	Apps	Goals
West Ham United	2012–13	Premier League	0	0	1	0	0	0	—		1	0
West Ham United	2013–14	Premier League	1	0	0	0	0	0	—		1	0
West Ham United	2014–15	Premier League	1	0	0	0	0	0	—		1	0
West Ham United	2015–16	Premier League	0	0	0	0	0	0	4 (Note: Appearances in UEFA Europa League)	1	4	1
West Ham United	Total		2	0	1	0	0	0	4	1	7	1
Colchester United (loan)	2013–14	League One	4	1	0	0	—		—		4	1
Southend United (loan)	2014–15	League Two	0	0	—		—		—		0	0
Luton Town (loan)	2014–15	League Two	11	3	—		—		—		11	3
Blackpool (loan)	2015–16	League One	4	0	—		—		—		4	0
Colchester United (loan)	2015–16	League One	15	2	0	0	—		—		15	2
Barnsley	2016–17	Championship	6	0	0	0	0	0	—		6	0
Luton Town	2017–18	League Two	32	10	2	1	1	0	3 (Note: Appearance(s) in EFL Trophy)	1	38	12
Luton Town	2018–19	League One	38	12	4	0	1	0	0	0	43	12
Luton Town	2019–20	Championship	11	1	1	0	3	1	—		15	2
Luton Town	2020–21	Championship	12	1	1	0	3	0	—		16	1
Luton Town	2021–22	Championship	0	0	0	0	1	0	—		1	0
Luton Town	Total		93	24	8	1	9	1	3	1	113	27
Oxford United (loan)	2020–21	League One	18	6	—		—		2 (Note: Appearances in League One play-offs)	0	20	6
Charlton Athletic (loan)	2021–22	League One	34	3	3	0	—		2	1	39	4
Wrexham	2022–23	National League	45	12	5	2	—		1 (Note: Appearance in FA Trophy)	1	51	15
Wrexham	2023–24	League Two	46	16	4	0	2	0	1	0	53	16
Wrexham	2024–25	League One	38	8	1	0	1	0	4	1	44	9
Wrexham	2025–26	Championship	0	0	0	0	3	1	—		3	1
Wrexham	Total		129	36	10	2	6	1	6	2	151	41
Doncaster Rovers (loan)	2025–26	League One	18	3	—		—		0	0	18	3
Career total			334	78	22	3	15	2	17	5	388	88

== Honours ==
Luton Town

- EFL League One: 2018–19
- EFL League Two second-place promotion: 2017–18

Wrexham

- National League: 2022–23
- EFL League Two runner-up: 2023–24
- EFL League One runner-up: 2024–25

Individual

- National League Team of the Year: 2022–23
- EFL League Two Team of the Season: 2023–24
- PFA Team of the Year: 2023–24 League Two
