= Andrew Shinnie =

Scottish footballer (born 1989)

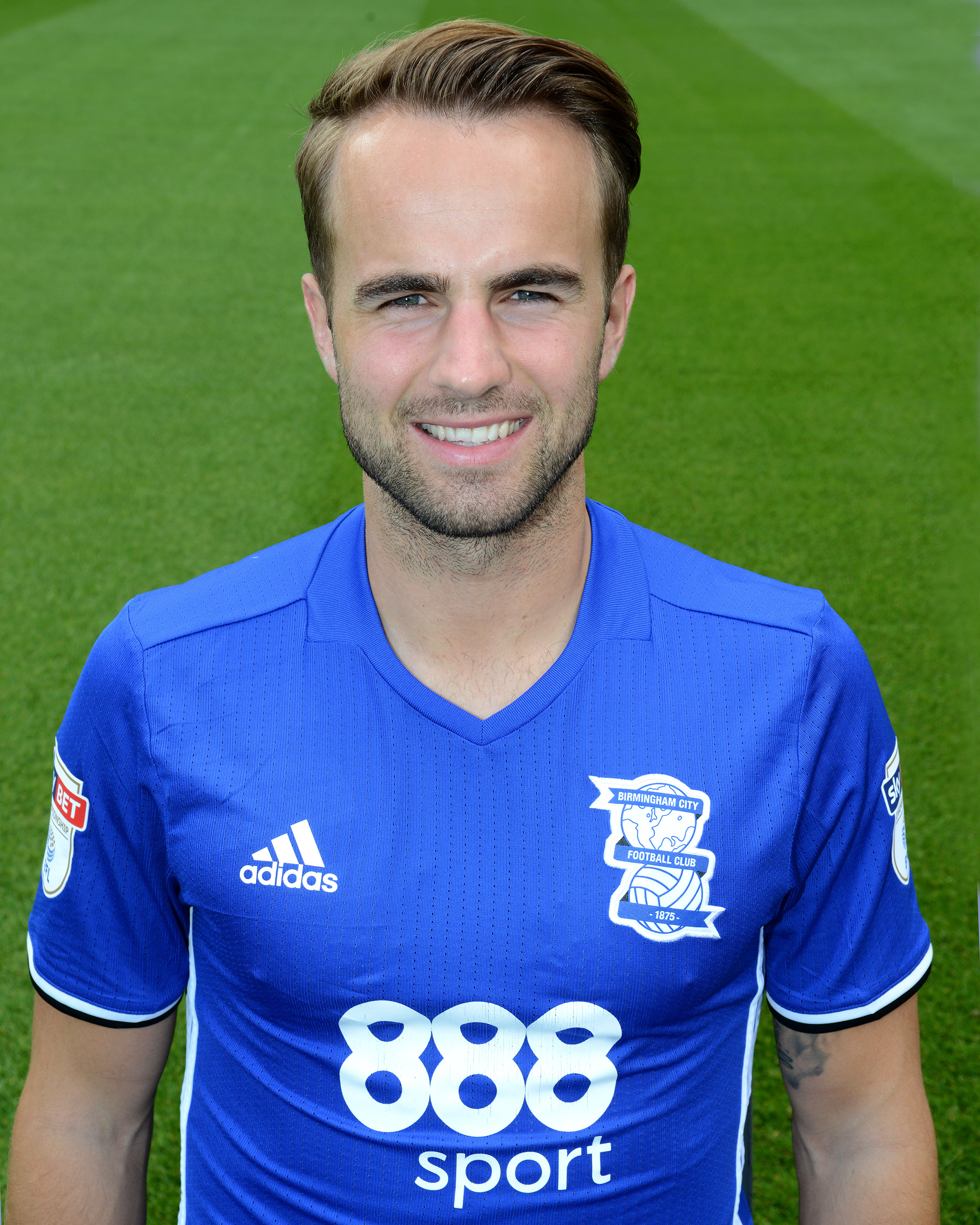
- Shinnie with Birmingham City in 2016

Personal information
- Full name: Andrew Murray Shinnie
- Date of birth: 17 July 1989 (age 37)
- Place of birth: Aberdeen, Scotland
- Height: 5 ft 11 in (1.81 m)
- Position: Attacking midfielder

Youth career
- 2006–2008: Rangers

Senior career*
Years	Team	Apps	(Gls)
2006–2011	Rangers	2	(0)
2008–2009	→ Dundee (loan)	20	(1)
2010	→ Dundee (loan)	12	(0)
2011–2013	Inverness Caledonian Thistle	57	(19)
2013–2018	Birmingham City	67	(4)
2016	→ Rotherham United (loan)	3	(0)
2016–2017	→ Hibernian (loan)	27	(1)
2017–2018	→ Luton Town (loan)	28	(1)
2018–2021	Luton Town	62	(5)
2020–2021	→ Charlton Athletic (loan)	16	(2)
2021	Charlton Athletic	13	(1)
2021–2026	Livingston	133	(10)
2026–	Stenhousemuir	0	(0)

International career
2007	Scotland U19	4	(0)
2009–2010	Scotland U21	3	(1)
2012	Scotland	1	(0)
- * Club domestic league appearances and goals as of 20 May 2026

Andrew Murray Shinnie (born 17 July 1989) is a Scottish professional footballer who plays for Scottish Championship club Stenhousemuir.

Shinnie started his professional career at Scottish Premier League side Rangers in 2006, but only made two league appearances in a five-year spell at the club. During his time at Rangers, he had two loan spells at Dundee: one during the 2008–09 season, and one in 2010, making 32 league appearances for the club. He joined Inverness Caledonian Thistle in July 2011, and made 57 league appearances in a two-year spell at the club, featuring in the 2012–13 PFA SPL Team of the Year, before joining Birmingham City in July 2013. He spent time on loan at Rotherham United in 2015–16, and then played on loan for Hibernian in 2016–17. After a loan spell during the 2017–18 season, Shinnie signed for Luton Town in June 2018.

Shinnie played at under-19 level for Scotland on four occasions in 2007, before making three appearances for the under-21 side in 2009 and 2010. He made his full international debut for Scotland in November 2012, in a 2–1 win over Luxembourg.

== Club career ==
=== Rangers ===
Shinnie made his first-team debut for Rangers on 17 March 2007, coming on as a substitute for Dado Pršo in a Scottish Premier League match against Aberdeen. On the same day, he scored two goals for Rangers' under-19 team against St Mirren under-19s. In April, he scored the first goal in the 5–0 win over rivals Celtic as Rangers won the 2007 Scottish Youth Cup Final. He went on to sign a new three-year professional contract to expire in the summer of 2010.

==== Dundee (loans) ====
Scottish First Division club Dundee signed Shinnie in November 2008 on loan for the rest of the season. On 29 November, he made his debut, coming on as a substitute in a 1–1 draw against St Johnstone; three months later on 21 February 2009, he scored his first senior goal in a 4–1 win over Livingston. Towards the end of the season, he scored an own goal in a 2–0 defeat to Clyde, and in the final game of the campaign, Darren Young opened the scoring after 32 seconds against Partick Thistle after the defence failed to clear Shinnie's corner; Dundee won the match 4–0.

Shinnie broke his foot during pre-season, and once back to fitness, returned to Dundee in January 2010 on loan until the end of the season. As in his first spell, he was a first-team regular for the duration of the loan spell.

=== Inverness Caledonian Thistle ===
Released by Rangers at the end of the 2010–11 season, Shinnie signed a two-year contract with SPL club Inverness Caledonian Thistle after impressing as a trialist in pre-season. He made his debut against Motherwell at Fir Park on 23 July. Shinnie scored his first goal for Inverness in a 2–1 victory over St Mirren on 1 October, and a month later scored a hat-trick as his team beat Kilmarnock 6–3 at Rugby Park. On 17 December 2011, he came on as a substitute against former club Rangers at Ibrox Park and scored to make the score 1–1. It was his seventh goal of the season but Inverness lost the game 2–1. Shinnie scored the second goal as Inverness beat Dunfermline Athletic 3–1 in the Scottish Cup fourth round replay on 18 January 2012, but broke a metatarsal during the match. The injury required surgery which was expected to keep him out for the rest of the season, although he was fit enough to return for the last three games. He felt he had been fortunate to leave Rangers before the club's financial problems took hold.

By mid-October the following season, Shinnie had scored seven goals, and manager Terry Butcher was anxious for him and teammate Josh Meekings to extend their contracts. At the end of the month he scored the first goal in Inverness CT's 3–0 League Cup quarter-final defeat of Rangers at Ibrox. His form earned him his first call-up to the full Scotland squad, and when he took the field in the friendly against Luxembourg, he became the first Inverness CT player to be capped for Scotland at senior level. By January, he had still not signed a new contract, and was linked with fellow SPL club Aberdeen, but had still not ruled out staying with Inverness CT. Shinnie scored the opening goal in the League Cup semi-final, but opponents Heart of Midlothian equalised, and then won the match in a penalty shootout. Shinnie's goalscoring form dipped as the season wore on – he produced only three goals in the 17 matches after the League Cup Final, compared with thirteen from 28 before it. – but his general form earned him a place on the four-man shortlist for the 2012–13 SPFA Players' Player of the Year Award and a place in the PFA Scotland SPL Team of the Year

=== Birmingham City ===
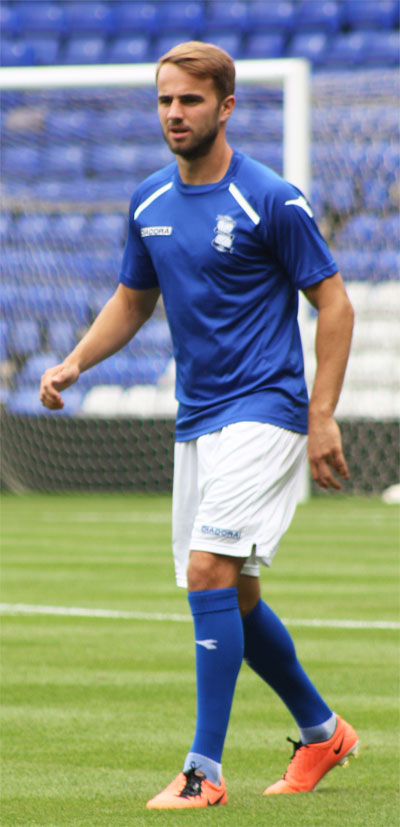
Shinnie training with Birmingham City in 2013 pre-season

In April, Shinnie signed a pre-contract agreement to join English Football League Championship club Birmingham City when his Inverness contract expired at the end of the season. He stated the move was "a difficult decision", but that "a three-year deal in a good league like the Championship was the right decision." and that he hoped the move would help him push for a place in the national team.

Shinnie made his Birmingham debut in a 1–0 defeat to Watford on the opening day of the season. He scored his first goal in the League Cup against Yeovil Town, when he "lashed home Chris Burke's fizzing cross"; Birmingham progressed to the third round on penalties. He should have scored at Queens Park Rangers in September, when he "blazed his shot over the crossbar" after Birmingham broke at pace, and he spent four games out of the league side, during which time he worked in the gym to improve his physical strength and in training on sharpness. He returned to orchestrate a 4–0 win against Millwall when manager Lee Clark's change of formation allowed him to play in his preferred playmaker role, and his first league goal opened the scoring in a 2–0 win at AFC Bournemouth on 14 December. He was regularly involved on matchdays for a time, but it was often as a substitute or in an unaccustomed wide position, and he was out of the side entirely between mid-January and March 2014. He returned with a good performance in a 3–3 draw at Burnley, and scored a headed goal in a 3–2 win away at fellow relegation candidates Millwall, but was substituted early in the next match when Clark wanted to field an extra striker. He was an unused substitute in the final match of the season, as Birmingham came back from 2–0 down at Bolton Wanderers to avoid relegation on goal difference via a stoppage-time equaliser and other results going in their favour.

Shinnie started the opening match of the 2014–15 season, but was omitted from the next two, and then injured his back playing for the under-21 side. His next first-team appearance was at Blackburn Rovers on 21 October when he was recalled to the squad by the caretaker managers the day after Clark was sacked; he came on in the 80th minute and came close to scoring an equaliser when his shot from 20 yards (18 m) struck the underside of the crossbar but failed to cross the line. Incoming manager Gary Rowett used Shinnie as the creative player in his preferred 4–2–3–1 formation, and he thrived in the role. By December, the Birmingham Mail's reporter thought he was "enjoying the finest spell of his Birmingham career", and a goal in a 6–1 defeat of Reading was a deserved reward for what Rowett called "fantastic" work-rate and build-up play. In March 2015, he scored the winner against Clark's new club, Blackpool, but then lost his regular place to loanee Diego Fabbrini.

Shinnie signed a two-year contract extension in the 2015 close season, but lost his first-choice playmaker role to loanee Jon Toral, whose goalscoring – and the fact that he was part of a winning side – made him hard to leave out.

==== Loans ====
Shinnie joined fellow Championship club Rotherham United on 27 January 2016 on loan until the end of the season. He made his debut three days later, as a second-half substitute with his side 2–1 down at home to Charlton Athletic; the match finished as a 4–1 defeat. He fell out of favour under Neil Warnock, who replaced Neil Redfearn as manager shortly after Shinnie's arrival, and made only three appearances during his loan spell.

Despite performing well in 2016 pre-season, Shinnie remained behind Diego Fabbrini as Birmingham's playmaker of choice, and on 17 August, he signed for Scottish Championship club Hibernian on loan for the season. He made his debut in Hibs' next match, coming on after 69 minutes with his side 2–0 ahead against St Mirren.

On 30 June 2017, Shinnie joined Luton Town of EFL League Two on loan for the season. He scored three goals from 34 appearances, as Luton were promoted to League One after finishing second in League Two.

=== Luton Town ===
Shinnie was released by Birmingham at the end of the 2017–18 season, and on 1 June 2018, he signed for Luton Town on a permanent two-year contract.

=== Charlton Athletic ===
Shinnie joined League One club Charlton Athletic on 16 October 2020 on loan for the 2020–21 season. He scored his first goal for Charlton in a 2–0 win over Oxford United on 27 October 2020.

On 19 February 2021, Shinnie's loan was made into a permanent deal until the end of the 2020–21 season.

On 18 May 2021, it was announced that Shinnie would leave Charlton Athletic at the end of his contract.

=== Livingston ===
Shinnie joined Scottish Premiership club Livingston on a two-year deal on 19 July 2021. He left Livi in May 2026 following the expiration of his contract.

== International career ==
Shinnie made his Scotland under-21 debut in a European Championship qualifier against Albania on 28 March 2009, and scored in the reverse fixture a few days later in a 5–2 victory. He played once more for the under-21 side. On 11 November 2012, Shinnie was called up to the full squad as a replacement for the match versus Luxembourg. Shinnie started the match, lining up in a wide midfield role in Billy Stark's 4–4–2 formation instead of his usual supporting role behind a lone striker, and contributed with an assist to one of Jordan Rhodes's two goals as Scotland won the match 2–1.

== Personal life ==
Shinnie was born in Aberdeen; he grew up in Cove Bay and attended Kincorth Academy. His younger brother Graeme also became a professional footballer, and they played together for Inverness Caledonian Thistle. The first time that the two brothers faced each other in a competitive game was in a 2016–17 Scottish Cup semi-final, between Andrew's Hibernian and Graeme's Aberdeen.

== Career statistics ==
As of match played 16 May 2025

Appearances and goals by club, season and competition
Club	Season	League			National cup (Note: Includes Scottish Cup, FA Cup)		League cup (Note: Includes Scottish League Cup, Football League Cup / EFL Cup)		Other		Total	
Club	Season	Division	Apps	Goals	Apps	Goals	Apps	Goals	Apps	Goals	Apps	Goals
Rangers	2006–07	Scottish Premier League	2	0	0	0	0	0	0	0	2	0
Rangers	2007–08	Scottish Premier League	0	0	0	0	0	0	0	0	0	0
Rangers	2008–09	Scottish Premier League	0	0	0	0	0	0	0	0	0	0
Rangers	2009–10	Scottish Premier League	0	0	0	0	0	0	0	0	0	0
Rangers	2010–11	Scottish Premier League	0	0	0	0	0	0	0	0	0	0
Rangers	Total		2	0	0	0	0	0	0	0	2	0
Dundee (loan)	2008–09	Scottish First Division	20	1	1	0	—		—		21	1
Dundee (loan)	2009–10	Scottish First Division	12	0	2	0	—		—		14	0
Dundee (loan)	Total		32	1	3	0	0	0	0	0	35	1
Inverness Caledonian Thistle	2011–12	Scottish Premier League	19	7	1	1	1	0	—		21	8
Inverness Caledonian Thistle	2012–13	Scottish Premier League	38	12	3	0	4	4	—		45	16
Inverness Caledonian Thistle	Total		57	19	4	1	5	4	0	0	66	24
Birmingham City	2013–14	Championship	26	2	0	0	2	1	—		28	3
Birmingham City	2014–15	Championship	27	2	1	0	0	0	—		29	2
Birmingham City	2015–16	Championship	14	0	1	0	2	1	—		17	1
Birmingham City	2016–17	Championship	0	0	0	0	0	0	—		0	0
Birmingham City	Total		67	4	2	0	4	2	0	0	73	6
Rotherham United (loan)	2015–16	Championship	3	0	—		—		—		3	0
Hibernian (loan)	2016–17	Scottish Championship	27	1	4	2	0	0	1 (Note: Appearance(s) in Scottish Challenge Cup)	0	32	3
Luton Town (loan)	2017–18	League Two	28	1	3	0	1	0	2 (Note: Appearance(s) in EFL Trophy)	2	34	3
Luton Town	2018–19	League One	41	4	4	1	1	0	1	0	47	5
Luton Town	2019–20	Championship	21	1	1	0	1	1	—		23	2
Luton Town	2020–21	Championship	0	0	0	0	2	0	—		2	0
Luton Town	Total		90	6	8	1	5	1	3	2	106	10
Charlton Athletic	2020–21	League One	29	3	0	0	—		0	0	29	3
Livingston	2021–22	Scottish Premiership	30	3	1	0	4	0	—		35	3
Livingston	2022–23	Scottish Premiership	33	1	2	0	5	1	—		40	2
Livingston	2023–24	Scottish Premiership	33	3	3	0	5	0	—		41	3
Livingston	2024–25	Scottish Championship	31	3	4	1	1	0	6 (Note: Four appearances and one goal in the Scottish Challenge Cup and two appearances in the Scottish Premiership Play-Offs)	1	42	5
Livingston	Total		127	10	10	1	15	1	6	1	158	13
Career total			434	44	31	5	29	8	10	3	504	60

== Honours ==
Hibernian

- Scottish Championship: 2016–17

Luton Town

- EFL League One: 2018–19
- EFL League Two runner-up: 2017–18

Livingston

- Scottish Challenge Cup: 2024–25
- Scottish Premiership play-offs: 2025

Individual

- PFA Scotland Team of the Year: 2012–13 Scottish Premier League
