= Kavan Cotter =

Association football player (born 1999)

Personal information
- Full name: Kavan John Cotter
- Date of birth: 3 May 1999 (age 27)
- Place of birth: Brent, England
- Height: 5 ft 11 in (1.81 m)
- Position: Midfielder

Team information
- Current team: Hitchin Town

Youth career
- Arsenal
- Queens Park Rangers
- –2016: Luton Town

Senior career*
| Years | Team | Apps | (Gls) |
| 2016–2018 | Luton Town | 0 | (0) |
| 2017 | → Hitchin Town (loan) | 6 | (0) |
| 2017 | → Hitchin Town (loan) | 12 | (0) |
| 2017–2018 | → Hitchin Town (loan) | 6 | (0) |
| 2018 | → Hitchin Town (loan) | 4 | (0) |
| 2018 | → Oxford City (loan) | 8 | (1) |
| 2018–2019 | Hemel Hempstead Town | 24 | (0) |
| 2018 | → Kings Langley (loan) | 5 | (0) |
| 2019– | Wealdstone | 0 | (0) |
| 2019– | → Farnborough (loan) | 0 | (0) |
- * Club domestic league appearances and goals as of 22:56, 29 May 2019 (UTC)

Kavan John Cotter (born 3 May 1999) is an English semi-professional footballer who plays as a midfielder for National League club Hitchin Town.

== Career ==
=== Luton Town and loan spells ===
Born in Brent, Greater London, Cotter started his career with Arsenal's youth academy, before moving to Queens Park Rangers. He then joined Luton Town at under-13 level, with whom he started his scholarship. Cotter was a member of the under-18 team that won the Youth Alliance South East title and the Youth Alliance Cup in 2015–16, and also reached the quarter-finals of the FA Youth Cup, in which they lost 1–0 to Blackburn Rovers. He captained the under-18 team the following season and made his first-team debut in a 2–1 victory away to Gillingham in an EFL Trophy group stage match on 30 August 2016. Cotter signed a professional contract with Luton on 23 May 2017. After signing, manager Nathan Jones said "It will be a big year for him as it's going to be a year when he can see if he can bridge that gap and we'll give him every opportunity to do that".

On 11 August 2017, Cotter signed for Southern League Premier Division club Hitchin Town on a one-month youth loan. He made six league appearances before returning to Luton. Cotter rejoined Hitchin on a one-month youth loan on 22 September. The loan was extended for another month on 23 October, before later being extended for a third month on 21 November, having made 22 appearances for Hitchin up to that point in 2017–18. He was recalled by Luton on 5 December, and started in a 4–0 home win over West Ham United U21 in the EFL Trophy second round, in which he scored Luton's third goal. Cotter returned to Hitchin on a one-month youth loan three days later. Having made a further six appearances for Hitchin, Cotter returned to Luton after the loan expired. On 12 February 2018, he rejoined Hitchin on a one-month youth loan and made five further appearances. Cotter was loaned out again on 16 March, joining National League South club Oxford City for the rest of the season. He finished the loan with one goal from nine appearances, as Oxford finished the season 16th in the table. He was released by Luton at the end of the season.

=== Hemel Hempstead Town ===
Following his release by Luton, Cotter signed for National League South club Hemel Hempstead Town, who loaned him out to Kings Langley of the Southern League Premier Division South on 13 August 2018. His debut came the following day in a 4–2 home defeat to Harrow Borough and he completed the loan spell with five appearances. After returning to Hemel Hempstead, he made his debut for the club on 22 September in a 6–1 away win over Bowers & Pitsea in the FA Cup second qualifying round.

=== Wealdstone ===
Cotter signed for fellow National League South club Wealdstone on 28 May 2019.

=== Hitchin Town ===
Cotter returned to Hitchin Town for a third spell in early 2026, having previously rejoined the club in March 2023. He made 38 appearances during the 2023–24 season before taking a break from football.

== Career statistics ==
As of 28 May 2019

Appearances and goals by club, season and competition
| Club | Season | League | | | FA Cup | | EFL Cup | | Other | | Total | |
| Club | Season | Division | Apps | Goals | Apps | Goals | Apps | Goals | Apps | Goals | Apps | Goals |
|---|---|---|---|---|---|---|---|---|---|---|---|---|
| Luton Town | 2016–17 | League Two | 0 | 0 | 0 | 0 | 0 | 0 | 1 (Note: Appearance in EFL Trophy) | 0 | 1 | 0 |
| Luton Town | 2017–18 | League Two | 0 | 0 | 0 | 0 | 0 | 0 | 1 | 1 | 1 | 1 |
| Luton Town | Total | | 0 | 0 | 0 | 0 | 0 | 0 | 2 | 1 | 2 | 1 |
| Hitchin Town (loan) | 2017–18 | Southern League Premier Division | 28 | 0 | 0 | 0 | — | | 7 (Note: Two appearances in Herts Charity Cup, three in Southern League Cup, two in FA Trophy) | 0 | 35 | 0 |
| Oxford City (loan) | 2017–18 | National League South | 8 | 1 | — | | — | | 1 (Note: Appearance in Oxfordshire Senior Cup) | 0 | 9 | 1 |
| Hemel Hempstead Town | 2018–19 | National League South | 24 | 0 | 4 | 0 | — | | 6 (Note: Three appearances in Herts Senior Cup, two in FA Trophy, one in Herts Charity Cup) | 0 | 34 | 0 |
| Kings Langley (loan) | 2018–19 | Southern League Premier Division South | 5 | 0 | — | | — | | — | | 5 | 0 |
| Wealdstone | 2019–20 | National League South | 0 | 0 | 0 | 0 | — | | 0 | 0 | 0 | 0 |
| Career total | | | 65 | 1 | 4 | 0 | 0 | 0 | 16 | 1 | 85 | 2 |
