= 2017–18 Luton Town F.C. season =

English football club season

Luton Town F.C.
2017–18 season
- Owner: Luton Town Football Club 2020 Limited
- Chairman: Nick Owen (until 3 August 2017); David Wilkinson (from 28 April 2018)
- Manager: Nathan Jones
- Stadium: Kenilworth Road
- League Two: 2nd (promoted)
- FA Cup: Third round (eliminated by Newcastle United)
- EFL Cup: First round (eliminated by Ipswich Town)
- EFL Trophy: Third round (eliminated by Peterborough United)
- Top goalscorer: League: Danny Hylton (21); All: Danny Hylton (23)
- Highest home attendance: 10,063 vs Notts County, League Two, 9 December 2017
- Lowest home attendance: 1,530 vs Barnet, EFL Trophy, 3 October 2017
- Average home league attendance: 8,676
Home colours	Away colours	Third colours

The 2017–18 season was the 132nd in the history of Luton Town Football Club, a professional association football club based in Luton, Bedfordshire, England. Their fourth-place finish in 2016–17 and defeat to Blackpool in the play-offs meant it was the club's fourth consecutive season in League Two and 92nd season in the English Football League. The season ran from 1 July 2017 to 30 June 2018.

== Background and pre-season ==
The 2016–17 season was Nathan Jones' first full season as manager of Luton Town, having been appointed in January 2016. Luton finished in fourth-place in the 2016–17 League Two table, having spent only one week of the season outside the top seven positions. This meant they reached the play-offs, and were beaten 6–5 on aggregate by Blackpool in the play-off semi-final, with the tie decided in the fifth minute of stoppage time by an own goal from goalkeeper Stuart Moore, who was on loan from Reading.

At the end of the 2016–17 season, Luton released Stephen O'Donnell, Danny Green, Zane Banton, Craig Mackail-Smith and Liam Gooch. Jonathan Smith, Josh McQuoid and Jake Gray were placed on the transfer list, with the latter signing for Yeovil Town for an undisclosed fee. Cameron McGeehan and Jack Marriott were sold to Championship and League One clubs Barnsley and Peterborough United respectively for undisclosed fees. Dan Potts was retained with a new one-year contract, while Craig King rejected a new contract in favour of dropping into non-League. James Justin signed a new three-year contract after Luton rejected a reported seven-figure bid from Championship club Nottingham Forest, while midfielder Pelly Ruddock Mpanzu extended his own contract at the club until 2020. Luton made eight summer signings, including goalkeepers Marek Štěch from Sparta Prague, James Shea from AFC Wimbledon, Harry Isted from Stoke City, defender Jack Stacey from Reading, midfielders Alan McCormack from Brentford, Andrew Shinnie on loan from Birmingham City, and strikers James Collins from Crawley Town, and Elliot Lee from Barnsley.

In terms of backroom staff, Luton chairman Nick Owen, who had fronted the consortium that took over and stabilised the club in 2008, announced he was to step down from the position on 3 August.

Pre-season match details
Date	Opponents	Venue	Result	Score F–A	Scorers	Attendance	Ref.
5 July 2017	Hitchin Town	A	D	2–2	Tomlinson 60', James 73'	1,332	
8 July 2017	Bedford Town	A	W	2–1	Collins 22', Potts 72' pen.	1,279	
15 July 2017	NK Bravo	A	W	6–2	Vassell (2) 8', 40', Cook 42', Collins (2) 58', 79', E. Lee 86' pen.	—	
18 July 2017	Hitchin Town	A	W	2–0	Rea 50', Collins 86'	533	
22 July 2017	Boreham Wood	A	W	2–0	Mpanzu 12', O. Lee 51'	—	
26 July 2017	Leicester City	H	L	0–1		4,237	
29 July 2017	Scunthorpe United	H	W	2–1	Collins 22' pen., Stacey 81'	1,735	

== Review ==
=== August ===
Luton began the season at home to Yeovil Town and won the match 8–2, the club's biggest Football League victory since a 6–0 win over Crewe Alexandra in December 1996. Otis Khan gave the away team the lead in the seventh minute with a free kick from 22 yards, before Olly Lee equalised five minutes later with a volley from Isaac Vassell's cross. James Collins put Luton in front on 19 minutes when he chipped the ball over goalkeeper Artur Krysiak and into the net, before Alan McCormack scored with a volley from 25 yards five minutes later to make the score 3–1. Vassell then scored twice in two minutes to give Luton a 5–1 lead, before Marek Štěch saved a penalty from Khan to ensure the score remained the same going into half-time. Collins scored twice in eight minutes after half-time to complete his hat-trick, before François Zoko scored a consolation goal for Yeovil a minute later with a header from Ryan Dickson's cross, and Elliot Lee scored Luton's eighth goal in the ninth minute of stoppage time. Transfer-listed midfielder Jonathan Smith had his contract with Luton terminated by mutual consent, allowing him to join Stevenage, while forward Harry Cornick was signed from AFC Bournemouth on a two-year contract, with the option of a one-year extension, for an undisclosed fee. Luton were knocked out of the EFL Cup in the first round after being beaten 2–0 at home to Championship club Ipswich Town, who scored in each half through David McGoldrick. Frankie Musonda signed a new contract with Luton, which contracted him to the club until the summer of 2019, and Kavan Cotter joined Southern League Premier Division club Hitchin Town on a one-month youth loan. Luton suffered their first league defeat of the season after losing 1–0 to Barnet, who scored in second-half stoppage time through Jack Taylor with a 25-yard curling shot. Vassell joined Championship club Birmingham City for an undisclosed fee.

Luton's first match in the EFL Trophy was at home to Tottenham Hotspur U21, and took the lead in the 19th minute through Luke Gambin with a drilled shot into the bottom corner, before the visitors equalised two minutes later when James Shea scored an own goal after Joe Pritchard's shot hit the post and rebounded off him. After going behind two minutes after half-time to Ryan Loft's goal, Josh McQuoid equalised on 51 minutes with a header from Jack James' cross. The match finished 2–2 and Luton went on to win the penalty shoot-out 4–2. This was followed by a 3–0 win at home to Colchester United, in which Olly Lee gave Luton the lead in first-half stoppage time after Colchester failed to clear a corner. Collins doubled the lead on 52 minutes with a curling shot into the top corner before Dan Potts touched in Alan Sheehan's free kick in the 83rd minute. Midfielder Luke Berry was signed from Cambridge United on a three-year contract, with the option of a one-year extension, for an undisclosed fee. Luton drew 2–2 away to Mansfield Town, who took the lead in the 23rd minute through Rhys Bennett after Luton failed to make a clearance, before Lee Angol doubled the lead on 71 minutes. Collins brought Luton back into the match in the 85th minute with a tap-in from close range, before Danny Hylton equalised four minutes later with a header from two yards. Štěch then saved a penalty from Jimmy Spencer in the sixth minute of stoppage time to ensure the score remained 2–2. Tyreeq Bakinson joined Championship club Bristol City for an undisclosed fee, while striker Aaron Jarvis was signed from Basingstoke Town on a one-year contract, with the option of a one-year extension, for an undisclosed fee.

=== September ===
Luton recorded their second successive away draw as they drew 0–0 with newly promoted Lincoln City. This was followed by a 3–0 defeat at home to Swindon Town, in which Scott Cuthbert was sent off in the 32nd minute for shirt pulling in the penalty area, with Luke Norris scoring the resulting penalty to give the visitors the lead. Chris Hussey doubled Swindon's lead six minutes after half-time, and Paul Mullin finished the scoring on 62 minutes with a powerful shot past Štěch. Luton returned to winning ways after a 2–0 win at home to Port Vale. Ben Whitfield scored an own goal on 38 minutes to put Luton in front before Jack Stacey scored five minutes after half-time with a powerful shot into the roof of the net to make the score 2–0, having run 60 yards in the process. Luton went behind away to Wycombe Wanderers when Adebayo Akinfenwa scored a header from Michael Harriman's cross in the 40th minute, before goalkeeper Scott Brown saved a penalty from Hylton on 52 minutes after he was fouled by Joe Jacobson. Cuthbert equalised with a volley in the 90th minute, and Collins scored with a close-range header in the eighth minute of stoppage time, meaning the match ended in a 2–1 win for Luton. Cotter returned to Hitchin Town on a one-month youth loan, while McQuoid was loaned to National League club Torquay United for three months. Hylton scored the only goal in the 53rd minute as Luton recorded a third successive victory after a 1–0 win at home to Chesterfield. Luton's run of wins ended with a 0–0 draw away to Morecambe, in which Jarvis made his debut as a substitute in the 87th minute. Sheehan scored a free kick to give Luton a 12th-minute lead at home to Newport County, before Hylton doubled the lead from close range 10 minutes later. Hylton then scored a penalty in the 35th minute to make the score 3–0 after Ben Tozer handled the ball in the penalty area, and Joss Labadie scored a consolation goal for Newport 10 minutes into the second half with a volley, the match finishing 3–1.

=== October ===
Luton went behind at home to Barnet in the EFL Trophy when Shea fouled Andre Blackman in the penalty area, with Jack Taylor scoring the resulting penalty to give the visitors the lead in the 63rd minute, before Elliot Lee equalised two minutes later with a 20-yard curling shot. The match finished 1–1 and Luton won the penalty shoot-out 4–3. Luton won 2–0 away to Accrington Stanley, a result that saw them move above Accrington into third place in the table. Collins opened the scoring with a tap-in on 22 minutes, and Hylton doubled the lead with a penalty late in the first half after Sheehan was tripped by Janoi Donacien in the penalty area. Berry scored a header to give Luton a third-minute lead at home to Stevenage, and Hylton scored four minutes later when he capitalised on a defensive mistake to make the score 2–0. Berry made it 3–0 with a shot into the bottom corner on 21 minutes, before Ben Kennedy pulled one back for Stevenage in first-half stoppage time. Hylton scored a penalty early into the second half, before Berry completed his hat-trick 10 minutes later with a 20-yard curling shot, and with further goals from Gambin and James Justin in stoppage time, the match finished 7–1.

Luton moved to the top of the table after a 4–1 win away to Exeter City. Collins opened the scoring for Luton from close range in the eighth minute, before Exeter equalised when Jake Taylor curled a shot into the top corner on 21 minutes. Potts restored Luton's lead shortly after half-time, before Hylton made it 3–1 with a powerful shot past goalkeeper Christy Pym in the 52nd minute, and Cornick finished the scoring three minutes later with a tap-in from close range from Hylton's cross. Luton's run of four successive league wins ended after drawing 0–0 away to Crawley Town, who had lost their last four home matches. Cotter's loan at Hitchin was extended for another month. A 3–0 defeat at home to Coventry City saw Luton's nine-match unbeaten run in the league come to an end, with the visitors taking the lead in the 17th minute through Marc McNulty with a header. Coventry scored twice in second-half stoppage time, the first coming after Rea was sent off for a foul on McNulty, with Jordan Shipley scoring the resulting free kick, and the second was scored by Duckens Nazon four minutes later to finish the scoring. Luton progressed to the second round of the EFL Trophy as Southern Group F winners after a 2–1 win away to AFC Wimbledon, in which they took the lead in the 12th minute when Andrew Shinnie's shot beat goalkeeper Joe McDonnell. Lyle Taylor equalised for AFC Wimbledon two minutes later with a shot into the bottom corner from close range, before Shinnie scored the winner on 72 minutes with a side-footed shot into the bottom corner.

=== November ===
Luton won 1–0 in their first-round match of the FA Cup at home to Portsmouth, in which Collins scored the only goal in first-half stoppage time with a left-footed shot into the bottom corner. Potts scored a header from Sheehan's corner to give Luton an 11th-minute lead away to Cheltenham Town, before the home team equalised through Jamie Grimes on 37 minutes. Elliot Lee put Luton back in front in the 86th minute when Sheehan's free kick hit the wall and fell to him inside the six-yard box before shooting into the bottom corner, and Will Boyle equalised for Cheltenham in the seventh minute of stoppage time from close range following Jerell Sellars' corner, the match finishing a 2–2 draw. Jack Senior signed a one-year contract extension with Luton, with the option of a further year. Luton moved back into the automatic promotion places after beating Cambridge United 7–0 at home, in which they took the lead after Potts scored from close range in the 24th minute. Olly Lee doubled the lead seven minutes later after chipping goalkeeper David Forde from 65 yards before Hylton scored on 35 minutes with a shot into the bottom corner to make the score 3–0. Elliot Lee extended the lead in first-half stoppage time with a volley into the top corner. Hylton scored from Stacey's cross in the 81st minute, before Elliot Lee scored Luton's sixth goal from 20 yards, and Hylton completed his hat-trick in the second minute of stoppage time from Sheehan's free kick. Cotter had his loan at Hitchin extended for another month.

Luton returned to the top of the table after a 3–0 win at home to Carlisle United, a result that ended Carlisle's seven-match unbeaten run. Shinnie gave Luton the lead in the 19th minute with a curling shot before Potts made it 2–0 with a diving header on 30 minutes. Cornick extended the lead in the 76th minute with a breakaway goal, and Jack Bonham saved a penalty from Hylton two minutes later to ensure the score remained 3–0. November ended with a third successive league win after Luton won 2–1 away to Crewe Alexandra, and took the lead in the 63rd minute with a Hylton shot that went in off the crossbar. Berry doubled the lead with a drilled shot four minutes later, and Crewe recorded a consolation goal after Johnny Mullins scored an own goal on 81 minutes.

=== December ===
Luton progressed to the third round of the FA Cup after beating Gateshead 5–0 away in the second round, in which Olly Lee opened the scoring in the 40th minute with a powerful shot from the edge of the penalty area. Potts doubled the lead on 62 minutes with a header from Shinnie's cross before Elliot Lee made it 3–0 five minutes later, and Luton finished the scoring in second-half stoppage time through Hylton and Berry. Cotter was recalled from his loan at Hitchin, and started in Luton's 4–0 home win over West Ham United U21 in the EFL Trophy second round. Lawson D'Ath gave Luton a 28th-minute lead with a header into the top corner from close range from Gambin's cross, and the lead was doubled 11 minutes into the second half through Jarvis with a half-volley from the edge of the penalty area. Cotter extended the lead in the 86th minute with a drilled shot from 15 yards, before Jordan Cook finished the scoring in stoppage time when an attempted clearance from goalkeeper Nathan Trott rebounded off him and into the net. Cotter was loaned back to Hitchin on a one-month youth loan. Luton drew their next match 1–1 at home to Notts County, having taken the lead through Mullins in the 26th minute with a header from Sheehan's corner before the away team equalised when Shola Ameobi headed the ball over Štěch and into the net from Jorge Grant's free kick in the 61st minute.

Luton extended their unbeaten league run to six matches after a 2–0 win away to Forest Green Rovers, in which Sheehan gave Luton the lead in first-half stoppage time with a drilled shot in off the post. Stacey was sent off on 60 minutes after catching Dan Wishart with a high boot, before Hylton extended the lead in the 68th minute with a tap-in after capitalising on a slip from goalkeeper Bradley Collins in the penalty area. Jarvis joined National League club Boreham Wood on a one-month youth loan, while striker Michael Shamalo joined Southern League Division One East club Barton Rovers on work experience. Luton won 2–0 at home to Grimsby Town, ending Grimsby's four-match unbeaten run and saw them move four points clear at the top of the table. Berry scored from 25 yards to give Luton a 40th-minute lead, before Collins made it 2–0 with a header into the bottom corner from Sheehan's free kick in the 61st minute. This was followed by a 5–0 home victory over Swindon Town, in which Luton took the lead three minutes into the second half through Collins with a curling shot into the top-left corner. Hylton doubled the lead seven minutes later with a header, his 15th goal of the season, before Matthew Taylor scored an own goal on 66 minutes from a Collins cross. Cornick made it 4–0 with a powerful shot in the 72nd minute, and Elliot Lee finished the scoring six minutes from time from a low curling shot. Luton's 12-match unbeaten run came to an end after a 4–0 away defeat to Port Vale in their final match of 2017. An own goal scored by Mullins gave the home team the lead in the 23rd minute, and in the second half Tom Pope scored twice, the first coming in the 60th minute and the second coming in the 82nd minute, either side of Ben Whitfield's 70th-minute goal.

=== January ===
Luton ended Lincoln City's seven-match unbeaten run with a 4–2 home victory on New Year's Day. Sheehan was sent off in the fourth minute after an altercation with Matt Rhead, with Michael Bostwick scoring the resulting 25-yard free kick to give Lincoln an early lead. Collins equalised from close range in the 32nd minute, before Matt Green restored Lincoln's lead two minutes later with a volley. However, Harry Anderson was sent off on 36 minutes after receiving a second yellow card for a foul on Shinnie, and Justin scored shortly before half-time with a shot from 22 yards into the bottom corner to make the score 2–2. Hylton converted Berry's cross in the 72nd minute, before Cornick finished the scoring 10 minutes later after he cut inside and scored with a powerful shot. Luton were beaten 3–1 in their third-round match of the FA Cup away to Newcastle United of the Premier League, who were three goals up by half-time with two goals from Ayoze Pérez and one from Jonjo Shelvey. Hylton scored a consolation goal for Luton early in the second half after rounding goalkeeper Freddie Woodman.

Luton were eliminated from the EFL Trophy after a 7–6 penalty shoot-out defeat to Peterborough United in the third round, and their best chance of the match came in the 37th minute when Cook's header hit the post from Cornick's cross. Luton lost 2–0 away to Chesterfield, who scored twice within a six-minute period, Joe Rowley scoring the opening goal in the 19th minute with a shot from eight yards, and Jak McCourt scored a penalty after Zavon Hines was tripped by Justin. Isted and James joined Chesham United and Hitchin of the Southern League Premier Division on a one-month youth loan and work experience respectively. Mullins scored a 64th-minute header from Olly Lee's free kick as Luton beat Morecambe 1–0 at home, moving six points clear at the top of the table. McQuoid's contract with Luton was cancelled by mutual consent. Luton recorded a second successive 1–0 victory away to Grimsby Town, with Collins scoring a 49th-minute winner from close range after goalkeeper Ben Killip tipped a Berry free kick onto the crossbar. Luton had fallen two goals behind at home to Wycombe Wanderers by the 39th minute of a 3–2 defeat, who scored through Paris Cowan-Hall and Nathan Tyson. Elliot Lee brought Luton back into the match four minutes later with a shot into the bottom corner, before Wycombe restored their two-goal advantage through a second goal from Tyson on 70 minutes, and Lee scored a consolation goal, his second of the match in the 78th minute. Defender Lloyd Jones and forward Jake Jervis were signed from Liverpool and Plymouth Argyle respectively on two-and-a-half-year contracts for undisclosed fees, while midfielder Flynn Downes joined on loan from Ipswich Town until the end of the season.

=== February ===
Cornick scored in the 38th minute with a deflected 18-yard shot as Luton beat their promotion rivals Exeter City 1–0 at home. Musonda went on a one-month youth loan to National League South club Oxford City. Luton saw their lead at the top of the table reduced to six points after a 1–1 draw away to Stevenage, in which they took the lead through Collins with a penalty five minutes from time after he was fouled by Ronnie Henry, before Danny Newton equalised for Stevenage three minutes later with a header from a Ben Kennedy corner. Cotter rejoined Hitchin on a one-month youth loan. Luton won 4–1 at home to Crawley Town, and took the lead in the 29th minute with an Olly Lee shot that went in off the crossbar, before Collins doubled the lead shortly before half-time with a deflected header from Lee's corner. Berry extended the lead with a drilled shot on 55 minutes, and Collins scored a 75th-minute penalty to make the score 4–0, before Crawley recorded a consolation goal through Karlan Ahearne-Grant three minutes from time. Shea signed a two-year contract extension with Luton, which contracted him to the club until 2020. Luton drew 2–2 at home to Cheltenham Town, who took the lead through Joe Morrell with a 30-yard shot in the 41st minute, and after Collins had a penalty saved by Scott Flinders, Mohamed Eisa doubled Cheltenham's lead early in the second half. Berry brought Luton back into the match on 58 minutes from close range before Sheehan headed an equaliser in the second minute of stoppage time from Gambin's corner.

=== March ===
Luton were held by Cambridge United to a 1–1 away draw, in which they took the lead in the 33rd minute when Collins rebounded in Hylton's parried shot, before he was sent off after receiving two yellow cards in four second-half minutes, and Jabo Ibehre equalised on 83 minutes with a header from Brad Halliday's cross. James' work experience loan at Hitchin was extended until 25 March. Luton were knocked off the top of the table by Accrington Stanley after a 2–1 home defeat, having topped the table since November. Sean McConville gave Accrington the lead with a curling shot into the top corner shortly before half-time, before Elliot Lee equalised in the 61st minute from Stacey's 70-yard pass, and Billy Kee scored the winner in the third minute of stoppage time with a drilled shot into the bottom corner from 25 yards. Luton drew 2–2 away to Coventry City, who took a two-goal lead in the first half through Peter Vincenti and Marc McNulty. Cuthbert pulled one back for Luton in the 55th minute with a header from Sheehan's free kick, before Collins headed an equaliser two minutes from time from Gambin's cross. Cotter joined Oxford City on loan for the rest of the season, while Musonda's loan was extended until the end of the season. Luton were held 1–1 away to Newport County, who took the lead in the second minute through Josh Sheehan who followed up for the rebound after Aaron Collins' shot was saved by Štěch, before Potts equalised with a header on 23 minutes. Luton returned to the top of the table after beating Barnet 2–0 at home, ending a run of five matches without a win. Hylton headed Luton into the lead on 47 minutes and Collins scored with a volley in the 67th minute. Luton lost 2–1 away to Colchester United, who were two goals up at half-time with goals from Tom Eastman and Luke Prosser before Hylton scored a penalty late in the second half after Gambin was fouled by Ryan Jackson in the penalty area.

=== April and May ===
Luton won 2–1 at home to Mansfield Town; having gone behind on 34 minutes to Kane Hemmings' goal, Collins equalised in the 61st minute from Mpanzu's cross, before Rea scored the winner with a tap-in 10 minutes later after goalkeeper Conrad Logan parried Sheehan's free kick into his path. Elliot Lee gave Luton a fourth-minute lead away to Yeovil Town from Hylton's flicked header, before the latter scored a penalty in the 20th minute after he was fouled by Ryan Dickson, who was sent off. François Zoko was then shown a red card on 32 minutes for an off-the-ball incident with McCormack, before Hylton made the score 3–0 from the rebound shortly before half-time after his initial shot from Collins' cross had hit the post. Luton then played Crewe Alexandra at home, who took the lead in the 35th minute through Jordan Bowery before Hylton equalised four minutes later with his 22nd goal of the season. Elliot Lee scored with a curling shot in first-half stoppage time, and Mpanzu finished the scoring with a 30-yard shot into the top corner early into the second half, meaning the match ended in a 3–1 win for Luton. Luton were promoted to League One after a 10-year absence following a 1–1 draw away to Carlisle United. Carlisle took the lead in the 13th minute when Danny Grainger scored a penalty after Richie Bennett was tripped by Shea in the penalty area, before Olly Lee equalised for Luton on 62 minutes from close range after a 20-yard shot from Hylton was parried by goalkeeper Jack Bonham. David Wilkinson was appointed as Nick Owen's successor as chairman. Luton's final home match of the season ended in a 3–1 victory over Forest Green Rovers, in which they took the lead in the 20th minute through Hylton who followed up for the rebound after Collins' shot was saved by goalkeeper Cameron Belford, before Christian Doidge equalised for the away team on 53 minutes. Olly Lee restored Luton's lead in the 86th minute when he converted Cornick's cross, and Mpanzu finished the scoring three minutes later with a deflected 20-yard shot. The result meant Luton secured second place in the table, with Accrington winning the League Two title. Luton's final match of the season was a 0–0 away draw with Notts County, in which Hylton was sent off for a second bookable offence.

== Competitions ==
=== EFL League Two ===
EFL League Two match details
Date	League position	Opponents	Venue	Result	Score F–A	Scorers	Attendance	Ref.
5 August 2017	1st	Yeovil Town	H	W	8–2	O. Lee 12', Collins (3) 19', 58', 66', McCormack 24', Vassell (2) 36', 38', E. Lee 90+9'	8,101	
12 August 2017	8th	Barnet	A	L	0–1		3,555	
19 August 2017	3rd	Colchester United	H	W	3–0	O. Lee 45+3', Collins 52', Potts 83'	7,865	
26 August 2017	5th	Mansfield Town	A	D	2–2	Collins 85', Hylton 89'	4,665	
2 September 2017	6th	Lincoln City	A	D	0–0		9,332	
9 September 2017	13th	Swindon Town	H	L	0–3		8,455	
12 September 2017	9th	Port Vale	H	W	2–0	Whitfield 38' o.g., Stacey 50'	7,046	
16 September 2017	4th	Wycombe Wanderers	A	W	2–1	Cuthbert 90', Collins 90+8'	5,512	
23 September 2017	3rd	Chesterfield	H	W	1–0	Hylton 53'	7,575	
26 September 2017	5th	Morecambe	A	D	0–0		1,354	
30 September 2017	5th	Newport County	H	W	3–1	Sheehan 12', Hylton (2) 22', 35' pen.	7,681	
7 October 2017	3rd	Accrington Stanley	A	W	2–0	Collins 22', Hylton 44' pen.	2,193	
14 October 2017	3rd	Stevenage	H	W	7–1	Berry (3) 3', 21', 62', Hylton (2) 7', 52' pen., Justin 90', Gambin 90+3'	9,208	
17 October 2017	1st	Exeter City	A	W	4–1	Collins 8', Potts 46', Hylton 52', Cornick 55'	4,209	
21 October 2017	1st	Crawley Town	A	D	0–0		3,494	
28 October 2017	3rd	Coventry City	H	L	0–3		9,670	
11 November 2017	4th	Cheltenham Town	A	D	2–2	Potts 11', E. Lee 86'	3,900	
18 November 2017	2nd	Cambridge United	H	W	7–0	Potts 24', O. Lee 31', Hylton (3) 35', 81', 90+2', E. Lee (2) 45+3', 88'	8,721	
21 November 2017	1st	Carlisle United	H	W	3–0	Shinnie 19', Potts 30', Cornick 76'	7,644	
25 November 2017	1st	Crewe Alexandra	A	W	2–1	Hylton 63', Berry 67'	4,571	
9 December 2017	1st	Notts County	H	D	1–1	Mullins 26'	10,063	
16 December 2017	1st	Forest Green Rovers	A	W	2–0	Sheehan 45+1', Hylton 68'	2,546	
23 December 2017	1st	Grimsby Town	H	W	2–0	Berry 40', Collins 61'	9,102	
26 December 2017	1st	Swindon Town	A	W	5–0	Collins 48', Hylton 55', Taylor 66' o.g., Cornick 72', E. Lee 84'	8,526	
30 December 2017	1st	Port Vale	A	L	0–4		5,523	
1 January 2018	1st	Lincoln City	H	W	4–2	Collins 32', Justin 43', Hylton 72', Cornick 82'	9,659	
13 January 2018	1st	Chesterfield	A	L	0–2		5,715	
20 January 2018	1st	Morecambe	H	W	1–0	Mullins 64'	8,476	
27 January 2018	1st	Grimsby Town	A	W	1–0	Collins 49'	4,159	
30 January 2018	1st	Wycombe Wanderers	H	L	2–3	E. Lee (2) 43', 78'	8,564	
3 February 2018	1st	Exeter City	H	W	1–0	Cornick 38'	8,788	
10 February 2018	1st	Stevenage	A	D	1–1	Collins 85' pen.	4,365	
13 February 2018	1st	Crawley Town	H	W	4–1	O. Lee 29', Collins (2) 45', 75' pen., Berry 55'	8,020	
24 February 2018	1st	Cheltenham Town	H	D	2–2	Berry 58', Sheehan 90+2'	8,453	
3 March 2018	1st	Cambridge United	A	D	1–1	Collins 33'	6,722	
10 March 2018	2nd	Accrington Stanley	H	L	1–2	E. Lee 61'	9,503	
13 March 2018	2nd	Coventry City	A	D	2–2	Cuthbert 55', Collins 88'	8,863	
17 March 2018	2nd	Newport County	A	D	1–1	Potts 23'	3,512	
24 March 2018	1st	Barnet	H	W	2–0	Hylton 47', Collins 67'	8,140	
30 March 2018	2nd	Colchester United	A	L	1–2	Hylton 88' pen.	5,461	
2 April 2018	2nd	Mansfield Town	H	W	2–1	Collins 61', Rea 71'	9,592	
7 April 2018	2nd	Yeovil Town	A	W	3–0	E. Lee 4', Hylton (2) 20' pen., 40'	4,316	
14 April 2018	2nd	Crewe Alexandra	H	W	3–1	Hylton 39', E. Lee 45+2', Mpanzu 51'	9,202	
21 April 2018	2nd	Carlisle United	A	D	1–1	O. Lee 62'	5,523	
28 April 2018	2nd	Forest Green Rovers	H	W	3–1	Hylton 20', O. Lee 86', Mpanzu 89'	10,029	
5 May 2018	2nd	Notts County	A	D	0–0		12,184	

==== League table ====
Pos	Team	Pld	W	D	L	GF	GA	GD	Pts	Promotion, qualification or relegation
1	Accrington Stanley (C, P)	46	29	6	11	76	46	+30	93	Promotion to EFL League One
2	Luton Town (P)	46	25	13	8	94	46	+48	88	Promotion to EFL League One
3	Wycombe Wanderers (P)	46	24	12	10	79	60	+19	84	Promotion to EFL League One
4	Exeter City	46	24	8	14	64	54	+10	80	Qualification for League Two play-offs (Note: Four teams play for one spot and promotion to EFL League One.)
5	Notts County	46	21	14	11	71	48	+23	77	Qualification for League Two play-offs

Source: BBC Sport
Rules for classification: 1) Points; 2) Goal difference; 3) Number of goals scored
(C) Champions; (P) Promoted

==== Results summary ====
Overall								Home						Away					
Pld	W	D	L	GF	GA	GD	Pts	W	D	L	GF	GA	GD	W	D	L	GF	GA	GD
46	25	13	8	94	46	+48	88	17	2	4	62	24	+38	8	11	4	32	22	+10

=== FA Cup ===
FA Cup match details
Round	Date	Opponents	Venue	Result	Score F–A	Scorers	Attendance	Ref.
First round	4 November 2017	Portsmouth	H	W	1–0	Collins 45+1'	5,333	
Second round	3 December 2017	Gateshead	A	W	5–0	O. Lee 40', Potts 62', E. Lee 67', Hylton 90+1', Berry 90+4'	1,339	
Third round	6 January 2018	Newcastle United	A	L	1–3	Hylton 49'	47,069	

=== EFL Cup ===
EFL Cup match details
Round	Date	Opponents	Venue	Result	Score F–A	Scorers	Attendance	Ref.
First round	8 August 2017	Ipswich Town	H	L	0–2		4,610	

=== EFL Trophy ===
EFL Trophy match details
Round	Date	Opponents	Venue	Result	Score F–A	Scorers	Attendance	Ref.
First round	15 August 2017	Tottenham Hotspur U21	H	D	2–2; 4–2 pens.	Gambin 19', McQuoid 51'	2,699	
First round	3 October 2017	Barnet	H	D	1–1; 4–3 pens.	E. Lee 65'	1,530	
First round	31 October 2017	AFC Wimbledon	A	W	2–1	Shinnie (2) 12', 72'	581	
Second round	5 December 2017	West Ham United U21	H	W	4–0	D'Ath 28', Jarvis 56', Cotter 86', Cook 90+1'	1,670	
Third round	9 January 2018	Peterborough United	H	D	0–0; 6–7 pens.		2,253	

==== First round (Southern Group F) ====
Pos	Lge	Team	Pld	W	PW	PL	L	GF	GA	GD	Pts	Qualification
1	L2	Luton Town (A)	3	1	2	0	0	5	4	+1	7	Round 2
2	L1	AFC Wimbledon (A)	3	2	0	0	1	9	8	+1	6	Round 2
3	L2	Barnet (E)	3	1	0	1	1	6	6	0	4	
4	ACA	Tottenham Hotspur U21 (E)	3	0	0	1	2	6	8	−2	1	

Updated to match(es) played on 28 November 2017. Source: Sky Sports
(A) Advances to a further round; (E) Eliminated

== Transfers ==
=== In ===
Date	Player	Club†	Fee	Ref.
26 June 2017	Jack Stacey	Reading	Undisclosed	
29 June 2017	James Collins	Crawley Town	Undisclosed	
1 July 2017	Alan McCormack	(Brentford)	Free	
1 July 2017	Marek Štěch	(Sparta Prague)	Free	
3 July 2017	James Shea	(AFC Wimbledon)	Free	
4 July 2017	Elliot Lee	(Barnsley)	Free	
27 July 2017	Harry Isted	(Stoke City)	Free	
8 August 2017	Harry Cornick	AFC Bournemouth	Undisclosed	
25 August 2017	Luke Berry	Cambridge United	Undisclosed	
31 August 2017	Aaron Jarvis	Basingstoke Town	Undisclosed	
31 January 2018	Jake Jervis	Plymouth Argyle	Undisclosed	
31 January 2018	Lloyd Jones	Liverpool	Undisclosed	

† Brackets around club names indicate the player's contract with that club had expired before he joined Luton.

=== Out ===
Date	Player	Club†	Fee	Ref.
1 July 2017	Zane Banton	(St Albans City)	Released	
1 July 2017	Liam Gooch	(Biggleswade Town)	Released	
1 July 2017	Danny Green	(Chelmsford City)	Released	
1 July 2017	Craig King	(Oxford City)	Released	
1 July 2017	Craig Mackail-Smith	(Wycombe Wanderers)	Released	
1 July 2017	Stephen O'Donnell	(Kilmarnock)	Released	
7 August 2017	Jonathan Smith	(Stevenage)	Released	
14 August 2017	Isaac Vassell	Birmingham City	Undisclosed	
31 August 2017	Tyreeq Bakinson	Bristol City	Undisclosed	
26 January 2018	Josh McQuoid	(Aldershot Town)	Released	

† Brackets around club names indicate the player joined that club after his Luton contract expired.

=== Loan in ===
Date	Player	Club	Return	Ref.
30 June 2017	Andrew Shinnie	Birmingham City	End of season	
31 January 2018	Flynn Downes	Ipswich Town	End of season	

=== Loan out ===
Date	Player	Club	Return	Ref.
11 August 2017	Kavan Cotter	Hitchin Town	11 September 2017	
22 September 2017	Kavan Cotter	Hitchin Town	Recalled 5 December 2017	
22 September 2017	Josh McQuoid	Torquay United	19 December 2017	
8 December 2017	Kavan Cotter	Hitchin Town	6 January 2018	
22 December 2017	Aaron Jarvis	Boreham Wood	One month	
22 December 2017	Michael Shamalo	Barton Rovers		
19 January 2018	Harry Isted	Chesham United	One month	
19 January 2018	Jack James	Hitchin Town	25 March 2018	
9 February 2018	Frankie Musonda	Oxford City	End of season	
12 February 2018	Kavan Cotter	Hitchin Town	One month	
16 March 2018	Kavan Cotter	Oxford City	End of season	

== Appearances and goals ==
Numbers in parentheses denote appearances as substitute.
Players with names struck through and marked † left the club during the playing season.
Players with names in italics and marked * were on loan from another club for the whole of their season with Luton.
Players listed with no appearances have been in the matchday squad but only as unused substitutes.
Key to positions: GK – Goalkeeper; DF – Defender; MF – Midfielder; FW – Forward

Players included in matchday squads
No.	Pos.	Nat.	Name	League		FA Cup		EFL Cup		EFL Trophy		Total		Discipline	
No.	Pos.	Nat.	Name	Apps	Goals	Apps	Goals	Apps	Goals	Apps	Goals	Apps	Goals	A yellow rectangle, denoting the yellow penalty card shown to a player being cautioned	A red rectangle, denoting the red penalty card shown to a player being sent off
1	GK	CZE	Marek Štěch	38	0	3	0	1	0	0	0	42	0	2	0
2	DF	ENG	James Justin	10 (7)	2	1	0	0	0	4	0	15 (7)	2	1	0
3	DF	ENG	Dan Potts	42	6	3	1	0	0	0	0	45	7	13	0
4	MF	IRL	Alan McCormack	15 (1)	1	0	0	0	0	0	0	15 (1)	1	7	0
5	DF	ENG	Johnny Mullins	14 (3)	2	2	0	0 (1)	0	2	0	18 (4)	2	1	0
6	DF	SCO	Scott Cuthbert	20 (3)	2	1	0	1	0	0	0	22 (3)	2	3	1
7	DF	ENG	Jack Stacey	40 (1)	1	2	0	1	0	1	0	44 (1)	1	2	1
8	MF	ENG	Olly Lee	38	6	3	1	1	0	0 (1)	0	42 (1)	7	6	0
9	FW	ENG	Danny Hylton	37 (2)	21	3	2	0	0	1	0	41 (2)	23	13	1
10	FW	ENG	Jordan Cook	1 (9)	0	0 (1)	0	1	0	4	1	6 (10)	1	4	1
11	MF	SCO	Andrew Shinnie *	24 (4)	1	3	0	1	0	1 (1)	2	29 (5)	3	3	0
14	FW	ENG	Harry Cornick	16 (21)	5	0 (2)	0	0	0	2	0	18 (23)	5	0	0
15	FW	ENG	Jake Jervis	2 (8)	0	0	0	0	0	0	0	2 (8)	0	0	0
16	DF	IRL	Glen Rea	39 (7)	1	2	0	1	0	1	0	43 (7)	1	5	1
17	MF	ENG	Pelly Ruddock Mpanzu	17 (11)	2	2 (1)	0	1	0	4	0	24 (12)	2	3	1
18	MF	ENG	Luke Berry	31 (3)	7	3	1	0	0	1 (1)	0	35 (4)	8	5	0
19	FW	IRL	James Collins	39 (3)	19	2	1	1	0	0	0	42 (3)	20	7	1
20	FW	ENG	~~Isaac Vassell~~ †	2	2	0	0	0	0	0	0	2	2	0	0
20	MF	ENG	Flynn Downes *	7 (3)	0	0	0	0	0	0	0	7 (3)	0	3	0
21	DF	ENG	Jack Senior	0	0	0	0	0	0	5	0	5	0	1	0
22	MF	MLT	Luke Gambin	4 (9)	1	0 (2)	0	0 (1)	0	4	1	8 (12)	2	1	0
23	FW	NIR	~~Josh McQuoid~~ †	0	0	0	0	0	0	0 (2)	1	0 (2)	1	0	0
24	MF	ENG	Lawson D'Ath	3 (6)	0	0	0	0	0	4	1	7 (6)	1	1	0
27	MF	ENG	~~Tyreeq Bakinson~~ †	0	0	0	0	0	0	1	0	1	0	0	0
27	FW	ENG	Aaron Jarvis	0 (1)	0	0	0	0	0	2 (1)	1	2 (2)	1	0	0
28	DF	ENG	Lloyd Jones	0 (1)	0	0	0	0	0	0	0	0 (1)	0	0	0
33	MF	ENG	Kavan Cotter	0	0	0	0	0	0	1	1	1	1	0	0
35	MF	ENG	Arthur Read	0	0	0	0	0	0	0 (2)	0	0 (2)	0	0	0
36	GK	ENG	James Shea	8	0	0	0	0	0	5	0	13	0	2	0
37	DF	ENG	Frankie Musonda	0	0	0	0	0	0	3 (1)	0	3 (1)	0	0	0
38	FW	ENG	Elliot Lee	16 (16)	10	1 (1)	1	1	0	3	1	21 (17)	12	2	0
39	DF	ENG	Akin Famewo	1 (2)	0	0	0	0	0	5	0	6 (2)	0	0	0
40	GK	ENG	Harry Isted	0	0	0	0	0	0	0	0	0	0	0	0
41	MF	ENG	Jake Peck	0	0	0	0	0	0	0	0	0	0	0	0
42	DF	ENG	Ciaren Jones	0	0	0	0	0	0	0	0	0	0	0	0
43	DF	IRL	Jack James	0	0	0	0	0	0	0 (1)	0	0 (1)	0	0	0
44	DF	IRL	Alan Sheehan	42	3	2	0	1	0	1	0	46	3	13	1
45	FW	ENG	Michael Shamalo	0	0	0	0	0	0	0	0	0	0	0	0
46	DF	ENG	Joe Mead	0	0	0	0	0	0	0	0	0	0	0	0
47	FW	ENG	Connor Tomlinson	0	0	0	0	0	0	0	0	0	0	0	0
48	FW	ENG	Josh Neufville	0	0	0	0	0	0	0	0	0	0	0	0
49	MF	ENG	Drew Richardson	0	0	0	0	0	0	0	0	0	0	0	0
