= 2022–23 EFL Championship =

19th season of the Football League Championship

EFL Championship
- Season: 2022–23
- Dates: 29 July 2022 – 8 May 2023
- Champions: Burnley; 2nd Championship title 4th 2nd tier title
- Promoted: Burnley; Sheffield United; Luton Town
- Relegated: Reading; Blackpool; Wigan Athletic
- Matches: 552
- Goals: 1,342 (2.43 per match)
- Top goalscorer: Chuba Akpom (Middlesbrough) (28 goals)
- Biggest home win: Middlesbrough 5–0 Reading (4 March 2023); Blackpool 6–1; Queens Park Rangers (14 March 2023)
- Biggest away win: Wigan Athletic 1–5 Burnley (27 August 2022); Stoke City 0–4 Watford (2 October 2022); Preston North End 0–4 Norwich City (14 January 2023); Huddersfield Town 0–4 Coventry City (4 March 2023); Sunderland 1–5; Stoke City (4 March 2023); Coventry City 0-4; Stoke City (1 April 2023)
- Highest scoring: Sunderland 4–4 Hull City (7 April 2023)
- Longest winning run: Burnley (10 games)
- Longest unbeaten run: Burnley (22 games)
- Longest winless run: Blackpool (14 games)
- Longest losing run: Birmingham City; Queens Park Rangers; Wigan Athletic (5 games)
- Highest attendance: 46,060; Sunderland 2–1; Luton Town (Play-off semi-final 1st leg) (13 May 2023)
- Lowest attendance: 8,618; Rotherham United 1–1; Millwall (5 October 2022)
- Total attendance: 10,351,379
- Average attendance: 18,787

The 2022–23 EFL Championship (referred to as the Sky Bet Championship for sponsorship reasons) was the 7th season of the EFL Championship under its current title and the 31st season under its current league division format.

The season started on 29 July 2022 and ended on 8 May 2023. Due to the 2022 FIFA World Cup in Qatar, the Championship took a 4-week break mid-season during the tournament. The break commenced in mid-November and the first round of fixtures after the World Cup was held on 10 December.

== Team changes ==
The following teams have changed division since the 2021–22 season:

=== To Championship ===
Promoted from League One

- Wigan Athletic
- Rotherham United
- Sunderland

Relegated from the Premier League

- Burnley
- Watford
- Norwich City

=== From Championship ===
Promoted to the Premier League

- Fulham
- Bournemouth
- Nottingham Forest

Relegated to League One

- Peterborough United
- Derby County
- Barnsley

== Stadiums ==
Locations of the 2022–23 EFL Championship teams
Locations of the 2022–23 EFL Championship North West teams

| Team | Location | Stadium | Capacity |
|---|---|---|---|
| Birmingham City | Birmingham | St Andrew's | 29,409 |
| Blackburn Rovers | Blackburn | Ewood Park | 31,367 |
| Blackpool | Blackpool | Bloomfield Road | 17,338 |
| Bristol City | Bristol | Ashton Gate Stadium | 27,000 |
| Burnley | Burnley | Turf Moor | 21,944 |
| Cardiff City | Cardiff | Cardiff City Stadium | 33,280 |
| Coventry City | Coventry | Coventry Building Society Arena | 32,609 |
| Huddersfield Town | Huddersfield | Kirklees Stadium | 24,121 |
| Hull City | Kingston upon Hull | MKM Stadium | 25,586 |
| Luton Town | Luton | Kenilworth Road | 10,356 |
| Middlesbrough | Middlesbrough | Riverside Stadium | 34,742 |
| Millwall | London (South Bermondsey) | The Den | 20,146 |
| Norwich City | Norwich | Carrow Road | 27,244 |
| Preston North End | Preston | Deepdale | 23,404 |
| Queens Park Rangers | London (White City) | Loftus Road | 18,439 |
| Reading | Reading | Madejski Stadium | 24,161 |
| Rotherham United | Rotherham | New York Stadium | 12,021 |
| Sheffield United | Sheffield | Bramall Lane | 32,050 |
| Stoke City | Stoke-on-Trent | bet365 Stadium | 30,089 |
| Sunderland | Sunderland | Stadium of Light | 49,000 |
| Swansea City | Swansea | Swansea.com Stadium | 21,088 |
| Watford | Watford | Vicarage Road | 22,200 |
| West Bromwich Albion | West Bromwich | The Hawthorns | 26,850 |
| Wigan Athletic | Wigan | DW Stadium | 25,138 |

== Personnel and sponsoring ==
| Team | Manager | Captain | Kit manufacturer | Shirt sponsor (front) | Shirt sponsor (back) | Shorts sponsor |
|---|---|---|---|---|---|---|
| Birmingham City | (England) John Eustace | (England) Troy Deeney | (United States) Nike | BoyleSports | Impact | amglogistics.co.uk |
| Blackburn Rovers | (Denmark) Jon Dahl Tomasson | (England) Lewis Travis | (Italy) Macron | Totally Wicked | Watson Ramsbottom Solicitors | None |
| Blackpool | (Scotland) Stephen Dobbie (interim) | (Wales) Chris Maxwell | (Germany) Puma | Utilita | Visit Blackpool | simPRO |
| Bristol City | (England) Nigel Pearson | (Austria) Andreas Weimann | (Denmark) Hummel | Huboo | None | Digital NRG |
| Burnley | (Belgium) Vincent Kompany | (England) Jack Cork | (England) Umbro | Classic Football Shirts (Home & Third); EMA Equity Partners (Away) | Vertu Motors | None |
| Cardiff City | (France) Sabri Lamouchi | (England) Joe Ralls | (United States) New Balance | Tourism Malaysia | None | None |
| Coventry City | (England) Mark Robins | (Scotland) Liam Kelly | (Denmark) Hummel | BoyleSports | XL Motors | G&R Scaffolding |
| Huddersfield Town | (England) Neil Warnock | (England) Jonathan Hogg | (England) Umbro | Utilita | SportsBroker | Skinny Food Co |
| Hull City | (England) Liam Rosenior | (England) Lewie Coyle | (England) Umbro | Corendon Airlines | Efes | Tomya |
| Luton Town | (Wales) Rob Edwards | (England) Sonny Bradley | (England) Umbro | Utilita (Home); Star Platforms (Away); Ryebridge (Third) | Toureen Group (Home); Utilita (Away & Third) | MuscleSquad |
| Middlesbrough | (England) Michael Carrick | (England) Jonny Howson | (Italy) Erreà | Unibet | Host and Stay | Cornerstone Business Solutions |
| Millwall | (England) Gary Rowett | (England) Shaun Hutchinson | (Denmark) Hummel | Huski Chocolate | Masons Scaffolding | Wiggett Group |
| Norwich City | (United States) David Wagner | (Scotland) Grant Hanley | (Spain) Joma | Lotus Cars | AEC Illuminazione | War Paint for Men |
| Preston North End | (England) Ryan Lowe | (Republic of Ireland) Alan Browne | (United States) Nike | PAR Group | PAR Group | None |
| Queens Park Rangers | (England) Gareth Ainsworth | (Norway) Stefan Johansen | (Italy) Erreà | Convivia | CopyBet | Ground Construction Limited |
| Reading | (Republic of Ireland) Noel Hunt (Interim) | (Ghana) Andy Yiadom | (Italy) Macron | Select Car Leasing | Rapidz | RSSL |
| Rotherham United | (England) Matt Taylor | (England) Richard Wood | (Germany) Puma | IPM Group (Home); Asura Financial Technologies (Away & Third) | Garner UK (Home); KCM Waste Management (Away & Third) | Mears Group |
| Sheffield United | (England) Paul Heckingbottom | (England) Billy Sharp | (Italy) Erreà | Randox | Ultimate Champions | None |
| Stoke City | (Scotland) Alex Neil | (England) Lewis Baker | (Italy) Macron | bet365 | None | None |
| Sunderland | (England) Tony Mowbray | (Northern Ireland) Corry Evans | (United States) Nike | Spreadex Sports | Vertu Motors | None |
| Swansea City | (Scotland) Russell Martin | (England) Matt Grimes | (Spain) Joma | Westacres (Home); Swansea University (Away); Owens Group (Third) | Swansea Building Society | The Travel House (Home); DWJ Wealth Management (Away & Third) |
| Watford | (England) Chris Wilder | (England) Tom Cleverley | (Spain) Kelme | Stake.com | Corpay | None |
| West Bromwich Albion | (Spain) Carlos Corberán | (England) Jake Livermore | (Germany) Puma | Ideal Heating | None | None |
| Wigan Athletic | (Scotland) Shaun Maloney | (Zimbabwe) Tendayi Darikwa | (Germany) Puma | Big Help Project (Home & Away); EPIC.gi (Third) | None | None |

== Managerial changes ==
| Team | Outgoing manager | Manner of departure | Date of vacancy | Position in table | Incoming manager | Date of appointment |
|---|---|---|---|---|---|---|
| Queens Park Rangers | (England) Mark Warburton | End of contract | 7 May 2022 | Pre-season | (England) Michael Beale | 1 June 2022 |
| Blackburn Rovers | (England) Tony Mowbray | End of contract | 7 May 2022 | Pre-season | (Denmark) Jon Dahl Tomasson | 14 June 2022 |
| Watford | (England) Roy Hodgson | End of contract | 22 May 2022 | Pre-season | (Wales) Rob Edwards | 23 May 2022 |
| Burnley | (England) Mike Jackson | End of caretaker spell | 22 May 2022 | Pre-season | (Belgium) Vincent Kompany | 14 June 2022 |
| Blackpool | (England) Neil Critchley | Signed by Aston Villa | 2 June 2022 | Pre-season | (England) Michael Appleton | 17 June 2022 |
| Birmingham City | (England) Lee Bowyer | Sacked | 2 July 2022 | Pre-season | (England) John Eustace | 3 July 2022 |
| Huddersfield Town | (Spain) Carlos Corberán | Resigned | 7 July 2022 | Pre-season | (England) Danny Schofield | 7 July 2022 |
| Stoke City | (Northern Ireland) Michael O'Neill | Sacked | 25 August 2022 | 21st | (Scotland) Alex Neil | 28 August 2022 |
| Sunderland | (Scotland) Alex Neil | Signed by Stoke City | 28 August 2022 | 12th | (England) Tony Mowbray | 30 August 2022 |
| Huddersfield Town | (England) Danny Schofield | Sacked | 14 September 2022 | 23rd | (Scotland) Mark Fotheringham | 28 September 2022 |
| Cardiff City | (Wales) Steve Morison | Sacked | 18 September 2022 | 18th | (England) Mark Hudson (Note: Hudson was initially named interim manager before being appointed manager until the end of the season on 14 November 2022.) | 18 September 2022 |
| Rotherham United | (England) Paul Warne | Signed by Derby County | 22 September 2022 | 8th | (England) Matt Taylor | 4 October 2022 |
| Watford | (Wales) Rob Edwards | Sacked | 26 September 2022 | 10th | (Croatia) Slaven Bilić | 26 September 2022 |
| Hull City | (Georgia (country)) Shota Arveladze | Sacked | 30 September 2022 | 20th | (England) Liam Rosenior | 3 November 2022 |
| Middlesbrough | (England) Chris Wilder | Sacked | 3 October 2022 | 22nd | (England) Michael Carrick | 24 October 2022 |
| West Bromwich Albion | (England) Steve Bruce | Sacked | 10 October 2022 | 22nd | (Spain) Carlos Corberán | 25 October 2022 |
| Luton Town | (Wales) Nathan Jones | Signed by Southampton | 10 November 2022 | 9th | (Wales) Rob Edwards | 17 November 2022 |
| Wigan Athletic | (England) Leam Richardson | Sacked | 10 November 2022 | 23rd | (Ivory Coast) Kolo Touré | 29 November 2022 |
| Queens Park Rangers | (England) Michael Beale | Signed by Rangers | 28 November 2022 | 7th | (England) Neil Critchley | 11 December 2022 |
| Norwich City | (England) Dean Smith | Sacked | 27 December 2022 | 5th | (United States) David Wagner | 6 January 2023 |
| Cardiff City | (England) Mark Hudson | Sacked | 14 January 2023 | 21st | (France) Sabri Lamouchi | 27 January 2023 |
| Blackpool | (England) Michael Appleton | Sacked | 18 January 2023 | 23rd | (Republic of Ireland) Mick McCarthy | 19 January 2023 |
| Wigan Athletic | (Ivory Coast) Kolo Touré | Sacked | 26 January 2023 | 24th | (Scotland) Shaun Maloney | 28 January 2023 |
| Huddersfield Town | (Scotland) Mark Fotheringham | Sacked | 8 February 2023 | 22nd | (England) Neil Warnock | 13 February 2023 |
| Queens Park Rangers | (England) Neil Critchley | Sacked | 19 February 2023 | 17th | (England) Gareth Ainsworth | 21 February 2023 |
| Watford | (Croatia) Slaven Bilić | Sacked | 7 March 2023 | 9th | (England) Chris Wilder | 7 March 2023 |
| Blackpool | (Republic of Ireland) Mick McCarthy | Mutual consent | 8 April 2023 | 23rd | (Scotland) Stephen Dobbie (interim) | 8 April 2023 |
| Reading | (England) Paul Ince | Sacked | 11 April 2023 | 22nd | (Republic of Ireland) Noel Hunt (interim) | 11 April 2023 |

== League table ==
| Pos | Team | Pld | W | D | L | GF | GA | GD | Pts | Promotion, qualification or relegation |
|---|---|---|---|---|---|---|---|---|---|---|
| 1 | Burnley (C, P) | 46 | 29 | 14 | 3 | 87 | 35 | +52 | 101 | Promotion to Premier League |
| 2 | Sheffield United (P) | 46 | 28 | 7 | 11 | 73 | 39 | +34 | 91 | Promotion to Premier League |
| 3 | Luton Town (O, P) | 46 | 21 | 17 | 8 | 57 | 39 | +18 | 80 | Qualification for Championship play-offs |
| 4 | Middlesbrough | 46 | 22 | 9 | 15 | 84 | 56 | +28 | 75 | Qualification for Championship play-offs |
| 5 | Coventry City | 46 | 18 | 16 | 12 | 58 | 46 | +12 | 70 | Qualification for Championship play-offs |
| 6 | Sunderland | 46 | 18 | 15 | 13 | 68 | 55 | +13 | 69 | Qualification for Championship play-offs |
| 7 | Blackburn Rovers | 46 | 20 | 9 | 17 | 52 | 54 | −2 | 69 | |
| 8 | Millwall | 46 | 19 | 11 | 16 | 57 | 50 | +7 | 68 | |
| 9 | West Bromwich Albion | 46 | 18 | 12 | 16 | 59 | 53 | +6 | 66 | |
| 10 | Swansea City | 46 | 18 | 12 | 16 | 68 | 64 | +4 | 66 | |
| 11 | Watford | 46 | 16 | 15 | 15 | 56 | 53 | +3 | 63 | |
| 12 | Preston North End | 46 | 17 | 12 | 17 | 45 | 59 | −14 | 63 | |
| 13 | Norwich City | 46 | 17 | 11 | 18 | 57 | 54 | +3 | 62 | |
| 14 | Bristol City | 46 | 15 | 14 | 17 | 55 | 56 | −1 | 59 | |
| 15 | Hull City | 46 | 14 | 16 | 16 | 51 | 61 | −10 | 58 | |
| 16 | Stoke City | 46 | 14 | 11 | 21 | 55 | 54 | +1 | 53 | |
| 17 | Birmingham City | 46 | 14 | 11 | 21 | 47 | 58 | −11 | 53 | |
| 18 | Huddersfield Town | 46 | 14 | 11 | 21 | 47 | 62 | −15 | 53 | |
| 19 | Rotherham United | 46 | 11 | 17 | 18 | 49 | 60 | −11 | 50 | |
| 20 | Queens Park Rangers | 46 | 13 | 11 | 22 | 44 | 71 | −27 | 50 | |
| 21 | Cardiff City | 46 | 13 | 10 | 23 | 41 | 58 | −17 | 49 | |
| 22 | Reading (R) | 46 | 13 | 11 | 22 | 46 | 68 | −22 | 44 (Note: Reading were deducted 6 points for breaching an EFL business plan.) | Relegation to League One |
| 23 | Blackpool (R) | 46 | 11 | 11 | 24 | 48 | 72 | −24 | 44 | Relegation to League One |
| 24 | Wigan Athletic (R) | 46 | 10 | 15 | 21 | 38 | 65 | −27 | 39 (Note: Wigan Athletic received a 3 point deduction in March 2023 after breaching a suspended sentence for late wage payments, followed by a further 3 point penalty in May 2023 for paying players late.) | Relegation to League One |

Source: EFL Official Website
Rules for classification: 1) Points; 2) Goal difference; 3) Number of goals scored; 4) Head-to-head results; 5) Wins; 6) Away goals; 7) Penalty points (sec 9.5); 8) 12-point sending off offences
(C) Champions; (O) Play-off winners; (P) Promoted; (R) Relegated

== Play-offs ==
Semi-finals
3 | Luton Town | 1 | 2 | 3
6 | Sunderland | 2 | 0 | 2
4 | Middlesbrough | 0 | 0 | 0
5 | Coventry City | 0 | 1 | 1

Final
3 | Luton Town | 1 (6)
5 | Coventry City | 1 (5)

First leg

13 May 2023
17:30

| Sunderland | 2–1 | Luton Town |
|---|---|---|
| Diallo 39'; Hume 63' | Report | Adebayo 11' |

Stadium of Light, Sunderland
Attendance: 46,060
Referee: Tim Robinson
14 May 2023
12:00

| Coventry City | 0–0 | Middlesbrough |
|---|---|---|
| | Report |

Coventry Building Society Arena, Coventry
Attendance: 28,874
Referee: Robert Madley

Second leg

16 May 2023
20:00

| Luton Town | 2–0 | Sunderland |
|---|---|---|
| Osho 10'; Lockyer 43' | Report |

Kenilworth Road, Luton
Attendance: 10,013
Referee: Simon Hooper

Luton Town won 3–2 on aggregate.

17 May 2023
20:00

| Middlesbrough | 0–1 | Coventry City |
|---|---|---|
| | Report | Hamer 57' |

Riverside Stadium, Middlesbrough
Attendance: 32,154
Referee: David Coote

Coventry City won 1–0 on aggregate.

=== Final ===
27 May 2023
16:45 BST

| Coventry City | 1–1 (a.e.t.) | Luton Town |
|---|---|---|
| Hamer 66' | Report | Clark 23' |
Penalties
| Godden (penalty scored); Gyökeres (penalty scored); Sheaf (penalty scored); Eccles (penalty scored); Kelly (penalty scored); Dabo (penalty missed) | 5–6 | (penalty scored) Morris; (penalty scored) Taylor; (penalty scored) Nakamba; (penalty scored) Clark; (penalty scored) Berry; (penalty scored) Potts |

Wembley Stadium, London
Attendance: 85,711
Referee: Michael Oliver

== Results ==
| Home \ Away | BIR | BLB | BLP | BRC | BUR | CAR | COV | HUD | HUL | LUT | MID | MIL | NOR | PNE | QPR | REA | ROT | SHU | STO | SUN | SWA | WAT | WBA | WIG |
|---|---|---|---|---|---|---|---|---|---|---|---|---|---|---|---|---|---|---|---|---|---|---|---|---|
| Birmingham City | — | 1–0 | 0–1 | 3–0 | 1–1 | 0–2 | 0–0 | 2–1 | 0–1 | 0–1 | 1–3 | 0–0 | 1–2 | 1–2 | 2–0 | 3–2 | 2–0 | 1–2 | 0–0 | 1–2 | 2–2 | 1–1 | 2–0 | 0–1 |
| Blackburn Rovers | 2–1 | — | 1–0 | 2–3 | 0–1 | 1–0 | 1–1 | 1–0 | 0–0 | 1–1 | 1–2 | 2–1 | 0–2 | 1–4 | 1–0 | 2–1 | 3–0 | 1–0 | 0–1 | 2–0 | 1–0 | 2–0 | 2–1 | 0–0 |
| Blackpool | 0–0 | 0–1 | — | 3–3 | 0–0 | 1–3 | 1–4 | 2–2 | 1–3 | 0–1 | 0–3 | 2–3 | 0–1 | 4–2 | 6–1 | 1–0 | 0–0 | 1–2 | 1–0 | 1–1 | 0–1 | 3–1 | 0–2 | 1–0 |
| Bristol City | 4–2 | 1–1 | 2–0 | — | 1–2 | 2–0 | 0–0 | 2–0 | 1–0 | 2–0 | 2–2 | 1–2 | 1–0 | 2–1 | 1–2 | 1–1 | 2–1 | 0–1 | 1–2 | 2–3 | 1–1 | 0–0 | 0–2 | 1–1 |
| Burnley | 3–0 | 3–0 | 3–3 | 2–1 | — | 3–0 | 1–0 | 4–0 | 1–1 | 1–1 | 3–1 | 2–0 | 1–0 | 3–0 | 1–2 | 2–1 | 3–2 | 2–0 | 1–1 | 0–0 | 4–0 | 1–1 | 2–1 | 3–0 |
| Cardiff City | 1–0 | 1–0 | 1–1 | 2–0 | 1–1 | — | 0–1 | 1–2 | 2–3 | 1–2 | 1–3 | 0–1 | 1–0 | 0–0 | 0–0 | 1–0 | 1–0 | 0–1 | 1–1 | 0–1 | 2–3 | 1–2 | 1–1 | 1–1 |
| Coventry City | 2–0 | 1–0 | 1–2 | 1–1 | 0–1 | 0–0 | — | 2–0 | 1–1 | 1–1 | 1–0 | 1–0 | 2–4 | 0–1 | 2–0 | 2–1 | 2–2 | 1–0 | 0–4 | 2–1 | 3–3 | 2–2 | 1–0 | 2–0 |
| Huddersfield Town | 2–1 | 2–2 | 0–1 | 0–0 | 0–1 | 1–0 | 0–4 | — | 2–0 | 1–2 | 4–2 | 1–0 | 1–1 | 0–1 | 1–1 | 2–0 | 2–0 | 1–0 | 3–1 | 0–2 | 0–0 | 0–2 | 2–2 | 1–2 |
| Hull City | 0–2 | 0–1 | 1–1 | 2–1 | 1–3 | 1–0 | 3–2 | 1–1 | — | 0–2 | 1–3 | 1–0 | 2–1 | 0–0 | 3–0 | 1–2 | 0–0 | 0–2 | 0–3 | 1–1 | 1–1 | 1–0 | 2–0 | 2–1 |
| Luton Town | 0–0 | 2–0 | 3–1 | 1–0 | 0–1 | 1–0 | 2–2 | 3–3 | 0–0 | — | 2–1 | 2–2 | 2–1 | 0–1 | 3–1 | 0–0 | 1–1 | 1–1 | 1–0 | 1–1 | 1–0 | 2–0 | 2–3 | 1–2 |
| Middlesbrough | 1–0 | 1–2 | 3–0 | 1–1 | 1–2 | 2–3 | 1–1 | 0–0 | 3–1 | 2–1 | — | 1–0 | 5–1 | 4–0 | 3–1 | 5–0 | 0–0 | 2–2 | 1–1 | 1–0 | 2–1 | 2–0 | 1–1 | 4–1 |
| Millwall | 0–1 | 3–4 | 2–1 | 0–0 | 1–1 | 2–0 | 3–2 | 0–1 | 0–0 | 0–0 | 2–0 | — | 2–3 | 2–0 | 0–2 | 0–1 | 3–0 | 3–2 | 2–0 | 1–1 | 2–1 | 3–0 | 2–1 | 1–1 |
| Norwich City | 3–1 | 0–2 | 0–1 | 3–2 | 0–3 | 2–0 | 3–0 | 2–1 | 3–1 | 0–1 | 1–2 | 2–0 | — | 2–3 | 0–0 | 1–1 | 0–0 | 0–1 | 3–1 | 0–1 | 0–3 | 0–1 | 1–1 | 1–1 |
| Preston North End | 0–1 | 1–1 | 3–1 | 1–2 | 1–1 | 2–0 | 0–0 | 1–2 | 0–0 | 1–1 | 2–1 | 2–4 | 0–4 | — | 0–1 | 2–1 | 0–0 | 0–2 | 0–2 | 0–3 | 1–0 | 0–0 | 1–0 | 2–1 |
| Queens Park Rangers | 0–1 | 1–3 | 0–1 | 0–2 | 0–3 | 3–0 | 0–3 | 1–2 | 3–1 | 0–3 | 3–2 | 1–2 | 1–1 | 0–2 | — | 2–1 | 1–1 | 1–1 | 0–0 | 0–3 | 1–1 | 1–0 | 0–1 | 2–1 |
| Reading | 1–1 | 3–0 | 3–1 | 2–0 | 0–0 | 2–1 | 1–0 | 3–1 | 1–1 | 1–1 | 1–0 | 0–1 | 1–1 | 1–2 | 2–2 | — | 2–1 | 0–1 | 2–1 | 0–3 | 2–1 | 2–2 | 0–2 | 1–1 |
| Rotherham United | 2–0 | 4–0 | 3–0 | 1–3 | 2–2 | 1–2 | 0–2 | 2–1 | 2–4 | 0–2 | 1–0 | 1–1 | 1–2 | 1–2 | 3–1 | 4–0 | — | 0–0 | 2–2 | 2–1 | 1–1 | 1–1 | 3–1 | 0–2 |
| Sheffield United | 1–1 | 3–0 | 3–3 | 1–0 | 5–2 | 4–1 | 3–1 | 1–0 | 1–0 | 0–1 | 1–3 | 2–0 | 2–2 | 4–1 | 0–1 | 4–0 | 0–1 | — | 3–1 | 2–1 | 3–0 | 1–0 | 2–0 | 1–0 |
| Stoke City | 1–2 | 3–2 | 2–0 | 1–2 | 0–1 | 2–2 | 0–2 | 3–0 | 0–0 | 2–0 | 2–2 | 0–1 | 0–0 | 0–1 | 0–1 | 4–0 | 0–1 | 3–1 | — | 0–1 | 1–1 | 0–4 | 1–2 | 0–1 |
| Sunderland | 2–1 | 2–1 | 0–0 | 1–1 | 2–4 | 0–1 | 1–1 | 1–1 | 4–4 | 1–1 | 2–0 | 3–0 | 0–1 | 0–0 | 2–2 | 1–0 | 3–0 | 1–2 | 1–5 | — | 1–3 | 2–2 | 1–2 | 2–1 |
| Swansea City | 3–4 | 0–3 | 2–1 | 2–0 | 1–2 | 2–0 | 0–0 | 1–0 | 3–0 | 0–2 | 1–3 | 2–2 | 0–1 | 4–2 | 1–0 | 3–2 | 1–1 | 0–1 | 1–3 | 2–1 | — | 4–0 | 3–2 | 2–2 |
| Watford | 3–0 | 1–1 | 2–0 | 2–0 | 1–0 | 1–3 | 0–1 | 2–3 | 0–0 | 4–0 | 2–1 | 0–2 | 2–1 | 0–0 | 2–3 | 2–0 | 1–1 | 1–0 | 2–0 | 2–2 | 1–2 | — | 3–2 | 1–1 |
| West Bromwich Albion | 2–3 | 1–1 | 1–0 | 0–2 | 1–1 | 0–0 | 1–0 | 1–0 | 5–2 | 0–0 | 2–0 | 0–0 | 2–1 | 2–0 | 2–2 | 1–0 | 3–0 | 0–2 | 2–0 | 1–2 | 2–3 | 1–1 | — | 1–0 |
| Wigan Athletic | 1–1 | 1–0 | 2–1 | 1–1 | 1–5 | 1–3 | 1–1 | 1–0 | 1–4 | 0–2 | 1–4 | 2–1 | 0–0 | 0–0 | 1–0 | 0–1 | 0–0 | 1–2 | 0–1 | 1–4 | 0–2 | 0–1 | 1–1 | — |

Source: EFL.com
Legend: Blue = home team win; Yellow = draw; Red = away team win.
For upcoming matches, an "a" indicates there is an article about the rivalry between the two participants.

== Season statistics ==
=== Top scorers ===
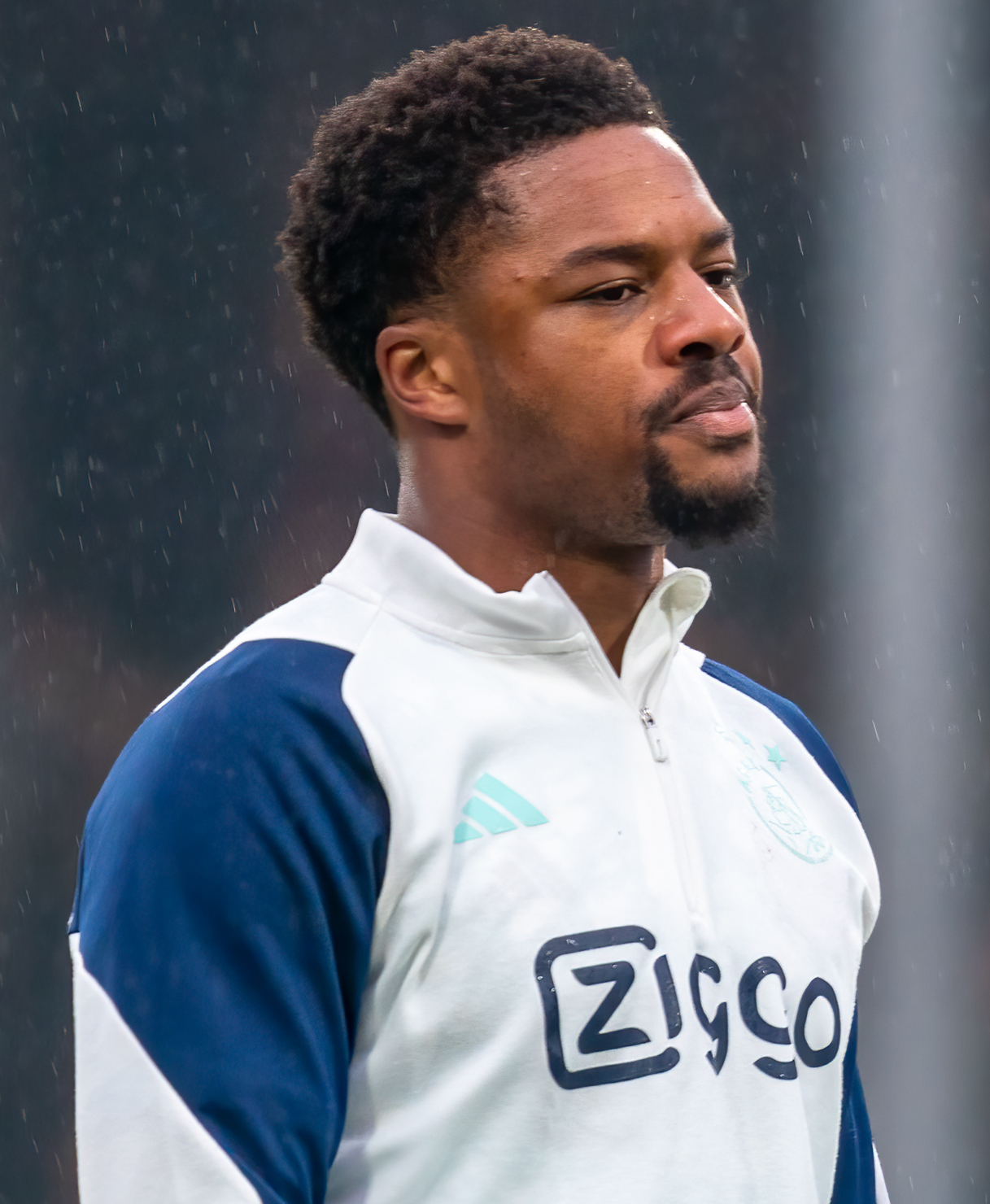
Middlesbrough's Chuba Akpom was the season's top goalscorer, having scored 28 goals. Akpom also won the award for EFL Championship Player of the Season.

| Rank | Player | Club | Goals |
|---|---|---|---|
| 1 | (England) Chuba Akpom | Middlesbrough | 28 |
| 2 | (Sweden) Viktor Gyökeres | Coventry City | 21 |
| 3 | (England) Carlton Morris | Luton Town | 20 |
| 4 | (Suriname) Joël Piroe | Swansea City | 19 |
| 5 | (Wales) Tom Bradshaw | Millwall | 17 |
| 5 | (Nigeria) Nathan Tella | Burnley | 17 |
| 7 | (Netherlands) Zian Flemming | Millwall | 15 |
| 8 | (Ivory Coast) Amad Diallo^{1} | Sunderland | 14 |
| 8 | (Chile) Ben Brereton Díaz | Blackburn Rovers | 14 |
| 8 | (Senegal) Iliman Ndiaye | Sheffield United | 14 |
| 8 | (England) Jerry Yates | Blackpool | 14 |

- ^{1} Includes 1 goal in The Championship play-offs.

==== Hat-tricks ====
| Player | For | Against | Result | Date |
|---|---|---|---|---|
| (Colombia) Óscar Estupiñán | Hull City | Coventry City | 3–2 (H) | 27 August 2022 |
| (Republic of Ireland) Scott Hogan | Birmingham City | West Bromwich Albion | 3–2 (A) | 14 September 2022 |
| (Wales) Tom Bradshaw | Millwall | Watford | 3–0 (H) | 19 October 2022 |
| (Netherlands) Zian Flemming | Millwall | Preston North End | 4–2 (A) | 12 November 2022 |
| (England) Chuba Akpom | Middlesbrough | Wigan Athletic | 4–1 (H) | 26 December 2022 |
| (Nigeria) Nathan Tella | Burnley | Preston North End | 3–0 (H) | 11 February 2023 |
| (Wales) Tom Bradshaw | Millwall | Sheffield United | 3–2 (H) | 18 February 2023 |
| (Nigeria) Nathan Tella | Burnley | Hull City | 3–1 (A) | 15 March 2023 |

=== Clean sheets ===
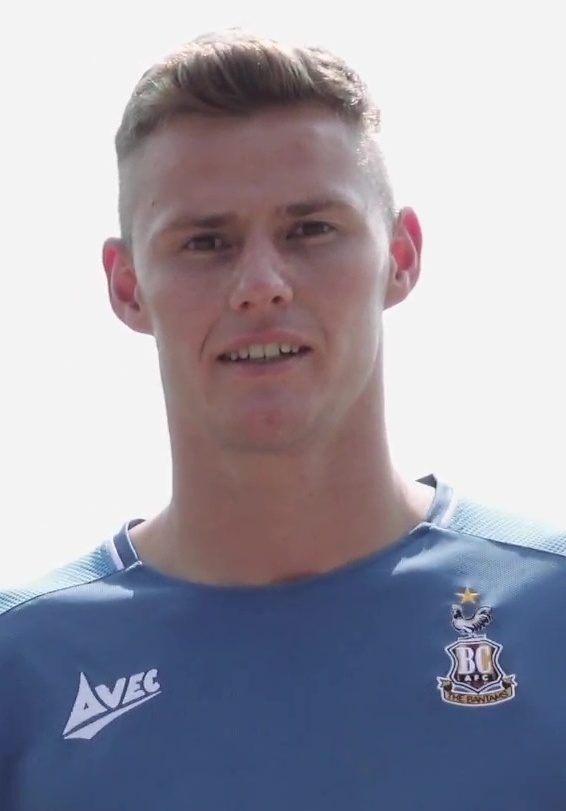
Coventry City's Ben Wilson won The Championship's Golden Glove award this season, keeping 22 clean sheets, as The Sky Blues reached The Championship play-off final.

| Rank | Player | Club | Clean sheets |
|---|---|---|---|
| 1 | (England) Ben Wilson^{2} | Coventry City | 22 |
| 2 | (United States) Ethan Horvath^{1} | Luton Town | 20 |
| 3 | (Kosovo) Arijanet Muric | Burnley | 18 |
| 4 | (England) Wes Foderingham | Sheffield United | 17 |
| 4 | (England) Freddie Woodman | Preston North End | 17 |
| 6 | (Austria) Daniel Bachmann | Watford | 16 |
| 7 | (England) Anthony Patterson | Sunderland | 14 |
| 7 | (England) John Ruddy | Birmingham City | 14 |
| 9 | (Sweden) Viktor Johansson | Rotherham United | 13 |
| 10 | (England) Ryan Allsop | Cardiff City | 12 |
| 10 | (England) George Long | Millwall | 12 |

- ^{1} Includes 1 clean sheet in The Championship play-offs.
- ^{2} Includes 2 clean sheets in The Championship play-offs.

=== Discipline ===
==== Player ====
- Most yellow cards: 14
  - (Bangladesh) Hamza Choudhury (Watford)
  - (Ghana) Andy Yiadom (Reading)
- Most red cards: 2
  - (England) Marvin Ekpiteta (Blackpool)
  - (England) Wes Foderingham (Sheffield United)
  - (Netherlands) Gustavo Hamer (Coventry City)
  - (Ivory Coast) Hassane Kamara (Watford)
  - (England) Gabriel Osho (Luton Town)

==== Club ====
- Most yellow cards: 108
  - Swansea City
- Most red cards: 9
  - Blackpool
- Fewest yellow cards: 74
  - Hull City
- Fewest red cards: 0
  - Birmingham City
  - Millwall
  - Queens Park Rangers

== Awards ==
=== Monthly ===
| Month | Manager of the Month | | Player of the Month | | Reference |
|---|---|---|---|---|---|
| August | (England) Paul Heckingbottom | Sheffield United | (Colombia) Óscar Estupiñán | Hull City | |
| September | (England) Paul Heckingbottom | Sheffield United | (England) Carlton Morris | Luton Town | |
| October | (Belgium) Vincent Kompany | Burnley | (England) Jerry Yates | Blackpool | |
| November | (England) Mark Robins | Coventry City | (Sweden) Viktor Gyökeres | Coventry City | |
| December | (Belgium) Vincent Kompany | Burnley | (England) Chuba Akpom | Middlesbrough | |
| January | (Belgium) Vincent Kompany | Burnley | (Netherlands) Ian Maatsen | Burnley | |
| February | (Belgium) Vincent Kompany | Burnley | (Wales) Tom Bradshaw | Millwall | |
| March | (England) Michael Carrick | Middlesbrough | (Sweden) Viktor Gyökeres | Coventry City | |
| April | (England) Paul Heckingbottom | Sheffield United | (Netherlands) Gustavo Hamer | Coventry City | |

=== Annual ===
| Award | Winner | Club |
|---|---|---|
| Player of the Season | (England) Chuba Akpom | Middlesbrough |
| Young Player of the Season | (England) Alex Scott | Bristol City |
| Apprentice of the Season | (England) Ashley Phillips | Blackburn Rovers |

Championship Team of the Season

| Pos. | Player | Club | Ref. |
|---|---|---|---|
| GK | (England) Ben Wilson | Coventry City | |
| RB | (Wales) Connor Roberts | Burnley | |
| CB | (Bosnia and Herzegovina) Anel Ahmedhodžić | Sheffield United | |
| CB | (Wales) Tom Lockyer | Luton Town | |
| LB | (Netherlands) Ian Maatsen | Burnley | |
| CM | (England) Alex Scott | Bristol City | |
| CM | (England) Josh Brownhill | Burnley | |
| CM | (Nigeria) Nathan Tella | Burnley | |
| FW | (Senegal) Iliman Ndiaye | Sheffield United | |
| FW | (England) Chuba Akpom | Middlesbrough | |
| FW | (Sweden) Viktor Gyökeres | Coventry City | |
| Manager | (Belgium) Vincent Kompany | Burnley | |

=== PFA Championship Team of the Year ===
| Pos. | Player | Club |
|---|---|---|
| GK | (Kosovo) Arijanet Muric | Burnley |
| RB | (Wales) Connor Roberts | Burnley |
| CB | (Bosnia and Herzegovina) Anel Ahmedhodžić | Sheffield United |
| CB | (Wales) Tom Lockyer | Luton Town |
| LB | (Netherlands) Ian Maatsen | Burnley |
| CM | (England) Josh Brownhill | Burnley |
| CM | (Nigeria) Nathan Tella | Burnley |
| CM | (Senegal) Iliman Ndiaye | Sheffield United |
| FW | (England) Chuba Akpom | Middlesbrough |
| FW | (Sweden) Viktor Gyökeres | Coventry City |
| FW | (England) Carlton Morris | Luton Town |

== Attendances ==
| # | Football club | Home games | Average attendance |
|---|---|---|---|
| 1 | Sunderland AFC | 23 | 39,046 |
| 2 | Sheffield United | 23 | 28,746 |
| 3 | Norwich City | 23 | 26,069 |
| 4 | Middlesbrough FC | 23 | 26,012 |
| 5 | West Bromwich Albion | 23 | 23,094 |
| 6 | Stoke City | 23 | 20,570 |
| 7 | Coventry City | 23 | 20,385 |
| 8 | Bristol City | 23 | 20,374 |
| 9 | Burnley FC | 23 | 19,953 |
| 10 | Cardiff City | 23 | 19,455 |
| 11 | Watford FC | 23 | 19,172 |
| 12 | Huddersfield Town | 23 | 18,978 |
| 13 | Hull City | 23 | 17,973 |
| 14 | Swansea City | 23 | 16,821 |
| 15 | Birmingham City | 23 | 16,758 |
| 16 | Preston North End | 23 | 16,119 |
| 17 | Queens Park Rangers | 23 | 14,977 |
| 18 | Blackburn Rovers | 23 | 14,772 |
| 19 | Millwall FC | 23 | 14,767 |
| 20 | Reading FC | 23 | 14,027 |
| 21 | Wigan Athletic | 23 | 12,210 |
| 22 | Blackpool FC | 23 | 12,192 |
| 23 | Rotherham United | 23 | 10,515 |
| 24 | Luton Town | 23 | 9,854 |
