= 2023 Super League season results =

2023 British rugby league results

Super League XXVIII is the 2023 season of the Super League, and 128th season of rugby league in Great Britain. The season began on 16 February 2023.

The full fixture list was released on 3 November 2022, with newly promoted Leigh Leopards set to take on Salford Red Devils, whilst defending champions St Helens, will only begin their season in round 2, due to their involvement in the World Club Challenge.

All times (including matches played in France) are UK local time; GMT (UTC±00:00) until 26 March, BST (UTC+01:00) thereafter.

== Regular season ==
=== Round 1 ===
| Home | Score | Away | Match information |
| Home | Score | Away | Date and time (GMT) | Venue | Referee | Attendance |
|---|---|---|---|---|---|---|
| Warrington Wolves | 42–10 | Leeds Rhinos | 16 February 2023, 20:00 | Halliwell Jones Stadium | Liam Moore | 11,082 |
| Wakefield Trinity | 24–38 | Catalans Dragons | 17 February 2023, 19:30 | The Be Well Support Stadium | Tom Grant | 4,076 |
| Leigh Leopards | 10–20 | Salford Red Devils | 17 February 2023, 20:00 | Leigh Sports Village | Jack Smith | 8,589 |
| Hull KR | 27–18 | Wigan Warriors | 18 February 2023, 13:00 | Sewell Group Craven Park | Chris Kendall | 10,029 |
| Hull FC | 32–30 | Castleford Tigers | 19 February 2023, 15:00 | MKM Stadium | Marcus Griffiths | 15,383 |
| St Helens | 32–18 | Huddersfield Giants | 13 August 2023, 17:00 (Note: Original fixture on 17 February postponed, due to St Helens' involvement in the World Club Challenge) | Totally Wicked Stadium | Ben Thaler | 12,028 |

=== Round 2 ===
| Home | Score | Away | Match information |
| Home | Score | Away | Date and time (GMT) | Venue | Referee | Attendance |
|---|---|---|---|---|---|---|
| Salford Red Devils | 10–24 | Hull KR | 23 February 2023, 20:00 | AJ Bell Stadium | Marcus Griffiths | 5,565 |
| Huddersfield Giants | 16–26 | Warrington Wolves | 24 February 2023, 19:45 | John Smiths Stadium | Chris Kendall | 7,737 |
| Leeds Rhinos | 18–22 | Hull FC | 24 February 2023, 20:00 | Headingley | Jack Smith | 16,140 |
| Wigan Warriors | 60–0 | Wakefield Trinity | 24 February 2023, 20:00 | DW Stadium | Aaron Moore | 12,306 |
| Catalans Dragons | 14–6 | Leigh Leopards | 25 February 2023, 18:00 | Stade Gilbert Brutus | Tom Grant | 7,862 |
| Castleford Tigers | 6–24 | St Helens | 26 February 2023, 13:00 | The Mend-A-Hose Jungle | Liam Moore | 10,062 |

=== Round 3 ===
| Home | Score | Away | Match information |
| Home | Score | Away | Date and time (GMT) | Venue | Referee | Attendance |
|---|---|---|---|---|---|---|
| Warrington Wolves | 36–20 | Salford Red Devils | 2 March 2023, 20:00 | Halliwell Jones Stadium | Jack Smith | 9,616 |
| Catalans Dragons | 38–6 | Hull FC | 3 March 2023, 18:00 | Stade Gilbert Brutus | Marcus Griffiths | 6,933 |
| Wakefield Trinity | 0–8 | Huddersfield Giants | 3 March 2023, 19:45 | The Be Well Support Stadium | Aaron Moore | 4,155 |
| Castleford Tigers | 0–36 | Wigan Warriors | 3 March 2023, 20:00 | The Mend-A-Hose Jungle | Tom Grant | 7,565 |
| Hull KR | 25–30 | Leigh Leopards | 3 March 2023, 20:00 | Sewell Group Craven Park | Liam Moore | 8,448 |
| St Helens | 24–25 | Leeds Rhinos | 3 March 2023, 20:00 | Totally Wicked Stadium | Chris Kendall | 15,148 |

=== Round 4 ===
| Home | Score | Away | Match information |
| Home | Score | Away | Date and time (GMT) | Venue | Referee | Attendance |
|---|---|---|---|---|---|---|
| Wigan Warriors | 10–18 | Catalans Dragons | 9 March 2023, 20:00 | DW Stadium | Marcus Griffiths | 11,451 |
| Huddersfield Giants | 36–6 | Castleford Tigers | 10 March 2023, 20:00 | John Smiths Stadium | Tom Grant | 4,070 |
| Hull KR | 10–18 | Warrington Wolves | 10 March 2023, 20:00 | Sewell Group Craven Park | Jack Smith | 7,500 |
| Leeds Rhinos | 26–0 | Wakefield Trinity | 10 March 2023, 20:00 | Headingley | Ben Thaler | 11,717 |
| Leigh Leopards | 20–12 | St Helens | 10 March 2023, 20:00 | Leigh Sports Village | Aaron Moore | 7,737 |
| Hull FC | 14–60 | Salford Red Devils | 11 March 2023, 15:00 | MKM Stadium | Chris Kendall | 11,323 |

=== Round 5 ===
| Home | Score | Away | Match information |
| Home | Score | Away | Date and time (GMT) | Venue | Referee | Attendance |
|---|---|---|---|---|---|---|
| Castleford Tigers | 14–8 | Leeds Rhinos | 16 March 2023, 20:00 | The Mend-A-Hose Jungle | Aaron Moore | 7,458 |
| Huddersfield Giants | 12–14 | Wigan Warriors | 17 March 2023, 19:45 | John Smiths Stadium | Jack Smith | 5,777 |
| St Helens | 20–12 | Hull FC | 17 March 2023, 20:00 | Totally Wicked Stadium | Liam Moore | 10,350 |
| Warrington Wolves | 38–20 | Leigh Leopards | 17 March 2023, 20:00 | Halliwell Jones Stadium | Ben Thaler | 12,073 |
| Catalans Dragons | 26–12 | Hull KR | 18 March 2023: 18:00 | Stade Gilbert Brutus | Chris Kendall | 7,682 |
| Salford Red Devils | 14–13 † | Wakefield Trinity | 19 March 2023: 15:00 | AJ Bell Stadium | Marcus Griffiths | 4,757 |

† - After extra time

=== Round 6 ===
| Home | Score | Away | Match information |
| Home | Score | Away | Date and time (GMT) | Venue | Referee | Attendance |
|---|---|---|---|---|---|---|
| Huddersfield Giants | 12–14 | St Helens | 23 March 2023, 20:00 | John Smiths Stadium | Jack Smith | 4,684 |
| Castleford Tigers | 0–38 | Warrington Wolves | 24 March 2023, 20:00 | The Mend-A-Hose Jungle | Marcus Griffiths | 7,348 |
| Wakefield Trinity | 6–34 | Hull KR | 24 March 2023, 20:00 | The Be Well Support Stadium | Aaron Moore | 4,705 |
| Wigan Warriors | 20–16 | Salford Red Devils | 24 March 2023, 20:00 | DW Stadium | Chris Kendall | 11,492 |
| Leeds Rhinos | 32–22 | Catalans Dragons | 25 March 2023: 13:00 | Headingley | Liam Moore | 14,321 |
| Hull FC | 16–24 | Leigh Leopards | 25 March 2023: 15:00 | MKM Stadium | Ben Thaler | 10,952 |

=== Round 7 ===
| Home | Score | Away | Match information |
| Home | Score | Away | Date and time (GMT) | Venue | Referee | Attendance |
|---|---|---|---|---|---|---|
| Leigh Leopards | 6–34 | Wigan Warriors | 30 March 2023, 20:00 | Leigh Sports Village | Liam Moore | 9,189 |
| Hull KR | 20–12 | Leeds Rhinos | 31 March 2023, 20:00 | Sewell Group Craven Park | Marcus Griffiths | 8,000 |
| St Helens | 38–0 | Wakefield Trinity | 31 March 2023, 20:00 | Totally Wicked Stadium | Chris Kendall | 10,304 |
| Warrington Wolves | 34–6 | Hull FC | 1 April 2023, 13:00 | Halliwell Jones Stadium | Aaron Moore | 10,797 |
| Catalans Dragons | 22–18 | Castleford Tigers | 1 April 2023, 17:00 | Stade Gilbert Brutus | Jack Smith | 8,109 |
| Salford Red Devils | 16–26 | Huddersfield Giants | 2 April 2023, 15:00 | AJ Bell Stadium | Ben Thaler | 4,764 |

=== Round 8 (rivals round/Easter weekend) ===
| Home | Score | Away | Match information |
| Home | Score | Away | Date and time (GMT) | Venue | Referee | Attendance |
|---|---|---|---|---|---|---|
| Castleford Tigers | 16–4 | Wakefield Trinity | 6 April 2023, 20:00 | The Mend-A-Hose Jungle | Marcus Griffiths | 8,075 |
| Hull FC | 0–40 | Hull KR | 7 April 2023, 12:30 | MKM Stadium | Jack Smith | 20,985 |
| Wigan Warriors | 14–6 | St Helens | 7 April 2023, 15:00 | DW Stadium | Liam Moore | 24,275 |
| Leigh Leopards | 20–22 | Salford Red Devils | 8 April 2023, 14:30 | Leigh Sports Village | Aaron Moore | 6,002 |
| Catalans Dragons | 14–20 | Warrington Wolves | 8 April 2023, 16:00 | Stade Gilbert Brutus | Chris Kendall | 10,786 |
| Leeds Rhinos | 18–17 | Huddersfield Giants | 9 April 2023, 18:00 | Headingley | Ben Thaler | 13,234 |

=== Round 9 ===
| Home | Score | Away | Match information |
| Home | Score | Away | Date and time (GMT) | Venue | Referee | Attendance |
|---|---|---|---|---|---|---|
| Salford Red Devils | 14–6 | Castleford Tigers | 13 April 2023, 20:00 | AJ Bell Stadium | Aaron Moore | 4,468 |
| Huddersfield Giants | 26–14 | Catalans Dragons | 14 April 2023, 19:45 | John Smiths Stadium | Liam Moore | 4,685 |
| Hull KR | 26–14 | St Helens | 14 April 2023, 20:00 | Sewell Group Craven Park | Ben Thaler | 8,765 |
| Leeds Rhinos | 34–10 | Hull FC | 14 April 2023, 20:00 | Headingley | Jack Smith | 12,644 |
| Warrington Wolves | 6–13 | Wigan Warriors | 14 April 2023, 20:00 | Halliwell Jones Stadium | Chris Kendall | 15,026 |
| Wakefield Trinity | 0–32 | Leigh Leopards | 16 April 2023, 15:00 | The Be Well Support Stadium | Marcus Griffiths | 4,710 |

=== Round 10 ===
| Home | Score | Away | Match information |
| Home | Score | Away | Date and time (BST) | Venue | Referee | Attendance |
|---|---|---|---|---|---|---|
| St Helens | 28–6 | Warrington Wolves | 20 April 2023, 20:00 | Totally Wicked Stadium | Jack Smith | 14,866 |
| Castleford Tigers | 7–12 | Hull KR | 21 April 2023, 20:00 | The Mend-A-Hose Jungle | Marcus Griffiths | 7,110 |
| Leigh Leopards | 20–6 | Leeds Rhinos | 21 April 2023, 20:00 | Leigh Sports Village | Ben Thaler | 6,686 |
| Salford Red Devils | 16–14 | Catalans Dragons | 23 April 2023, 14:15 | AJ Bell Stadium | Chris Kendall | 3,974 |
| Hull FC | 20–14 | Huddersfield Giants | 23 April 2023, 15:00 | MKM Stadium | Liam Moore | 10,859 |
| Wigan Warriors | 22–6 | Wakefield Trinity | 23 April 2023, 15:00 | DW Stadium | Aaron Moore | 12,240 |

=== Round 11 ===
| Home | Score | Away | Match information |
| Home | Score | Away | Date and time (BST) | Venue | Referee | Attendance |
|---|---|---|---|---|---|---|
| Hull FC | 14–10 | Wigan Warriors | 4 May 2023, 20:00 | MKM Stadium | Ben Thaler | 10,251 |
| Catalans Dragons | 24–12 | St Helens | 5 May 2023, 19:45 | Stade Gilbert Brutus | Liam Moore | 10,763 |
| Hull KR | 28–0 | Huddersfield Giants | 5 May 2023, 20:00 | Sewell Group Craven Park | Chris Kendall | 7,250 |
| Leeds Rhinos | 12–22 | Salford Red Devils | 5 May 2023, 20:00 | Headingley | Jack Smith | 13,007 |
| Leigh Leopards | 30–6 | Castleford Tigers | 5 May 2023, 20:00 | Leigh Sports Village | Aaron Moore | 5,423 |
| Warrington Wolves | 32–18 | Wakefield Trinity | 5 May 2023, 20:00 | Halliwell Jones Stadium | Marcus Griffiths | 10,209 |

=== Round 12 ===
| Home | Score | Away | Match information |
| Home | Score | Away | Date and time (BST) | Venue | Referee | Attendance |
|---|---|---|---|---|---|---|
| Wakefield Trinity | 6–26 | Hull FC | 11 May 2023, 20:00 | The Be Well Support Stadium | Jack Smith | 3,976 |
| Huddersfield Giants | 4–30 | Leigh Leopards | 12 May 2023, 19:45 | John Smiths Stadium | Marcus Griffiths | 4,977 |
| Castleford Tigers | 22–46 | Catalans Dragons | 12 May 2023, 20:00 | The Mend-A-Hose a Jungle | Aaron Moore | 5,788 |
| Warrington Wolves | 21–14 | Hull KR | 12 May 2023, 20:00 | Halliwell Jones Stadium | Ben Thaler | 10,129 |
| Wigan Warriors | 18–40 | Leeds Rhinos | 12 May 2023, 20:00 | DW Stadium | Liam Moore | 12,167 |
| St Helens | 26–12 | Salford Red Devils | 13 May 2023, 13:00 | Totally Wicked Stadium | Chris Kendall | 11,881 |

=== Round 13 ===
| Home | Score | Away | Match information |
| Home | Score | Away | Date and time (BST) | Venue | Referee | Attendance |
|---|---|---|---|---|---|---|
| Hull KR | 22–26 | Wigan Warriors † | 25 May 2023, 20:00 | Sewell Group Craven Park | Jack Smith | Not given |
| Catalans Dragons | 36–6 | Wakefield Trinity | 26 May 2023, 18:00 | Stade Gilbert Brutus | Ben Thaler | 8,123 |
| Huddersfield Giants | 20–4 | Castleford Tigers | 26 May 2023, 19:45 | John Smiths Stadium | Aaron Moore | 4,206 |
| Leeds Rhinos | 12–13 | St Helens † | 26 May 2023, 20:00 | Headingley Stadium | Liam Moore | 14,161 |
| Leigh Leopards | 30–12 | Warrington Wolves | 26 May 2023, 20:00 | Leigh Sports Village | Chris Kendall | 8,120 |
| Salford Red Devils | 29–22 | Hull FC | 28 May 2023, 15:00 | AJ Bell Stadium | Marcus Griffiths | 4,569 |

† – After extra time

=== Round 14 (Magic Weekend) ===
| Team 1 | Score | Team 2 | Match information |
| Team 1 | Score | Team 2 | Date and time (BST) | Venue | Referee | Attendance |
|---|---|---|---|---|---|---|
| Salford Red Devils | 26–16 | Hull KR | 3 June 2023, 13:30 | St James' Park | Chris Kendall | 36,943 (Day 1) |
| Wigan Warriors | 22–46 | Catalans Dragons | 3 June 2023, 16:00 | St James' Park | Liam Moore | 36,943 (Day 1) |
| Leeds Rhinos | 24–26 | Castleford Tigers | 3 June 2023, 18:00 | St James' Park | Ben Thaler | 36,943 (Day 1) |
| Wakefield Trinity | 4–30 | Leigh Leopards | 4 June 2023, 12:00 | St James' Park | Aaron Moore | 26,326 (Day 2) |
| St Helens | 48–6 | Huddersfield Giants | 4 June 2023, 14:30 | St James' Park | Marcus Griffiths | 26,326 (Day 2) |
| Hull FC | 30–18 | Warrington Wolves | 4 June 2023, 16:40 | St James' Park | Jack Smith | 26,326 (Day 2) |

=== Round 15 ===
| Home | Score | Away | Match information |
| Home | Score | Away | Date and time (BST) | Venue | Referee | Attendance |
|---|---|---|---|---|---|---|
| Castleford Tigers | 10–42 | Salford Red Devils | 9 June 2023, 20:00 | The Mend-A-Hose Jungle | Jack Smith | 6,354 |
| Leigh Leopards | 28–16 | Hull FC | 9 June 2023, 20:00 | Leigh Sports Village | Ben Thaler | 6,006 |
| St Helens | 34–16 | Wigan Warriors | 9 June 2023, 20:00 | Totally Wicked Stadium | Chris Kendall | 17,088 |
| Warrington Wolves | 30–26 | Huddersfield Giants | 10 June 2023, 17:00 | Halliwell Jones Stadium | Liam Moore | 9,007 |
| Catalans Dragons | 38–4 | Hull KR | 10 June 2023, 18:00 | Stade Gilbert Brutus | Marcus Griffiths | 9,453 |
| Wakefield Trinity | 24–14 | Leeds Rhinos | 11 June 2023, 15:00 | The Be Well Support Stadium | Aaron Moore | 4,710 |

=== Round 16 ===
| Home | Score | Away | Match information |
| Home | Score | Away | Date and time (BST) | Venue | Referee | Attendance |
|---|---|---|---|---|---|---|
| Hull FC | 34–6 | St Helens | 22 June 2023, 20:00 | MKM Stadium | Jack Smith | 9,937 |
| Castleford Tigers | 23–14 | Warrington Wolves | 23 June 2023, 20:00 | The Mend-A-Hose a Jungle | Marcus Griffiths | 6,066 |
| Hull KR | 28–12 | Wakefield Trinity | 23 June 2023, 20:00 | Sewell Group Craven Park | Chris Kendall | Not Given |
| Leeds Rhinos | 54–0 | Huddersfield Giants | 23 June 2023, 20:00 | Headingley | Ben Thaler | 14,590 |
| Catalans Dragons | 38–30 | Leigh Leopards | 24 June 2023, 18:00 | Stade Gilbert Brutus | Liam Moore | 9,636 |
| Salford Red Devils | 6–26 | Wigan Warriors | 25 June 2023, 15:00 | AJ Bell Stadium | Aaron Moore | 7,854 |

=== Round 17 ===
| Home | Score | Away | Match information |
| Home | Score | Away | Date and time (BST) | Venue | Referee | Attendance |
|---|---|---|---|---|---|---|
| Warrington Wolves | 6–22 | Leeds Rhinos | 29 June 2023, 20:00 | Halliwell Jones Stadium | Chris Kendall | 8,981 |
| Wakefield Trinity | 32–6 | Salford Red Devils | 30 June 2023, 19:45 | The Be Well Support Stadium | Ben Thaler | 3,854 |
| Leigh Leopards | 34–4 | Hull KR | 30 June 2023, 20:00 | Leigh Sports Village | Marcus Griffiths | 6,012 |
| St Helens | 22–0 | Castleford Tigers | 30 June 2023, 20:00 | Totally Wicked Stadium | Aaron Moore | 11,490 |
| Wigan Warriors | 22–6 | Huddersfield Giants | 30 June 2023, 20:00 | DW Stadium | Jack Smith | 13,464 |
| Hull FC | 18–28 | Catalans Dragons | 1 July 2023, 15:00 | MKM Stadium | Liam Moore | 13,480 |

=== Round 18 ===
| Home | Score | Away | Match information |
| Home | Score | Away | Date and time (BST) | Venue | Referee | Attendance |
|---|---|---|---|---|---|---|
| Wakefield Trinity † | 27–26 | Wigan Warriors | 7 July 2023, 19:45 | The Be Well Support Stadium | Marcus Griffiths | 4,185 |
| Castleford Tigers | 16–34 | Leigh Leopards | 7 July 2023, 20:00 | The Mend-A-Hose a Jungle | Liam Moore | 6,344 |
| Warrington Wolves | 20–24 | St Helens | 7 July 2023, 20:00 | Halliwell Jones Stadium | Jack Smith | 12,385 |
| Catalans Dragons | 14–22 | Huddersfield Giants | 8 July 2023, 19:00 | Stade Gilbert Brutus | Chris Kendall | 9,182 |
| Hull KR | 6–16 | Hull FC | 9 July 2023, 12:00 | Sewell Group Craven Park | Ben Thaler | 12,225 |
| Salford Red Devils | 14–16 | Leeds Rhinos | 9 July 2023, 15:00 | AJ Bell Stadium | Aaron Moore | 5,157 |

† – After extra time

=== Round 19 ===
| Home | Score | Away | Match information |
| Home | Score | Away | Date and time (BST) | Venue | Referee | Attendance |
|---|---|---|---|---|---|---|
| St Helens | 12–14 | Catalans Dragons | 13 July 2023, 20:00 | Totally Wicked Stadium | Liam Moore | 12,193 |
| Huddersfield Giants | 34–6 | Wakefield Trinity | 14 July 2023, 19:45 | John Smiths Stadium | Aaron Moore | 5,872 |
| Leeds Rhinos | 18–19 | Hull KR † | 14 July 2023, 20:00 | Headingley | Tom Grant | 13,728 |
| Wigan Warriors | 26–12 | Warrington Wolves | 14 July 2023, 20:00 | DW Stadium | Chris Kendall | 13,105 |
| Hull FC | 36–18 | Castleford Tigers | 15 July 2023, 15:00 | MKM Stadium | Marcus Griffiths | 12,352 |
| Salford Red Devils | 22–24 | Leigh Leopards | 16 July 2023, 15:00 | AJ Bell Stadium | Ben Thaler | 6,892 |

† – After extra time

=== Round 20 ===
| Home | Score | Away | Match information |
| Home | Score | Away | Date and time (BST) | Venue | Referee | Attendance |
|---|---|---|---|---|---|---|
| Huddersfield Giants | 19–12 | Hull FC | 27 July 2023, 20:00 | John Smiths Stadium | Aaron Moore | 4,579 |
| Hull KR | 34–16 | Castleford Tigers | 28 July 2023, 20:00 | Sewell Group Craven Park | Chris Kendall | N/A |
| St Helens | 22–18 | Leeds Rhinos | 28 July 2023, 20:00 | Totally Wicked Stadium | Liam Moore | 12,108 |
| Wigan Warriors | 44–18 | Leigh Leopards | 29 July 2023, 13:00 | DW Stadium | Jack Smith | 15,377 |
| Catalans Dragons | 42–0 | Salford Red Devils | 29 July 2023, 18:00 | Stade Gilbert Brutus | Marcus Griffiths | 9,503 |
| Wakefield Trinity | 42–6 | Warrington Wolves | 30 July 2023, 15:00 | The Be Well Support Stadium | Tom Grant | 4,470 |

=== Round 21 ===
| Home | Score | Away | Match information |
| Home | Score | Away | Date and time (BST) | Venue | Referee | Attendance |
|---|---|---|---|---|---|---|
| Castleford Tigers | 0–28 | Huddersfield Giants | 4 August 2023, 20:00 | The Mend-A-Hose a Jungle | Tom Grant | 6,452 |
| Warrington Wolves | 10–30 | Catalans Dragons | 4 August 2023, 20:00 | Halliwell Jones Stadium | Liam Moore | 10,312 |
| Wigan Warriors | 64–6 | Hull KR | 4 August 2023, 20:00 | DW Stadium | Aaron Moore | 11,464 |
| Hull FC | 42–4 | Wakefield Trinity | 6 August 2023, 15:00 | MKM Stadium | Chris Kendall | 11,956 |
| Leeds Rhinos | 6–13 | Leigh Leopards | 6 August 2023, 15:00 | Headingley | Marcus Griffiths | 12,785 |
| Salford Red Devils | 15–18 | St Helens | 6 August 2023, 15:00 | AJ Bell Stadium | Jack Smith | 6,515 |

=== Round 22 ===
| Home | Score | Away | Match information |
| Home | Score | Away | Date and time (BST) | Venue | Referee | Attendance |
|---|---|---|---|---|---|---|
| Huddersfield Giants | 8–30 | Salford Red Devils | 18 August 2023, 19:45 | John Smiths Stadium | Liam Moore | 4,685 |
| St Helens | 28–6 | Hull KR | 18 August 2023, 20:00 | Totally Wicked Stadium | Tom Grant | 11,258 |
| Wakefield Trinity | 12–28 | Castleford Tigers | 18 August 2023, 20:00 | The Be Well Support Stadium | Chris Kendall | 4,710 |
| Wigan Warriors † | 13–12 | Hull FC | 18 August 2023, 20:00 | DW Stadium | Aaron Moore | 12,107 |
| Leigh Leopards | 14–30 | Catalans Dragons | 19 August 2023, 15:00 | Leigh Sports Village | Jack Smith | 8,602 |
| Leeds Rhinos | 24–22 | Warrington Wolves | 20 August 2023, 15:00 | Headingley | Ben Thaler | 15,166 |

† = After extra time

=== Round 23 ===
| Home | Score | Away | Match information |
| Home | Score | Away | Date and time (BST) | Venue | Referee | Attendance |
|---|---|---|---|---|---|---|
| Salford Red Devils | 20–0 | Wakefield Trinity | 25 August 2023, 19:45 | AJ Bell Stadium | Tom Grant | 3,836 |
| Castleford Tigers | 4–34 | St Helens | 25 August 2023, 20:00 | The Mend-A-Hose a Jungle | Aaron Moore | 6,668 |
| Hull KR | 52–10 | Leigh Leopards | 25 August 2023, 20:00 | Sewell Group Craven Park | Jack Smith | Not given |
| Hull FC | 4–18 | Warrington Wolves | 26 August 2023, 15:00 | MKM Stadium | Chris Kendall | 11,624 |
| Catalans Dragons | 0–34 | Wigan Warriors | 26 August 2023, 18:00 | Stade Gilbert Brutus | Liam Moore | 10,614 |
| Huddersfield Giants | 21–12 | Leeds Rhinos | 27 August 2023, 15:00 | John Smiths Stadium | Marcus Griffiths | 6,621 |

=== Round 24 ===
| Home | Score | Away | Match information |
| Home | Score | Away | Date and time (BST) | Venue | Referee | Attendance |
|---|---|---|---|---|---|---|
| Hull KR | 26–18 | Catalans Dragons | 1 September 2023, 20:00 | Sewell Group Craven Park | Ben Thaler | N/A |
| Wigan Warriors | 26–8 | Salford Red Devils | 1 September 2023, 20:00 | DW Stadium | Chris Kendall | 12,905 |
| Hull FC | 12–28 | Leeds Rhinos | 2 September 2023, 15:00 | MKM Stadium | Tom Grant | 11,064 |
| Warrington Wolves | 66–12 | Castleford Tigers | 2 September 2023, 15:00 | Halliwell Jones Stadium | Jack Smith | 9,103 |
| Leigh Leopards | 34–16 | Huddersfield Giants | 3 September 2023, 15:00 (Note: original match on 1 September was abandoned after 45 minutes due to floodlight failure.) | Leigh Sports Village | Liam Moore | 6,064 |
| Wakefield Trinity | 16–32 | St Helens | 3 September 2023, 15:00 | The Be Well Support Stadium | Marcus Griffiths | 4,544 |

=== Round 25 ===
| Home | Score | Away | Match information |
| Home | Score | Away | Date and time (BST) | Venue | Referee | Attendance |
|---|---|---|---|---|---|---|
| Wakefield Trinity | 10–18 | Catalans Dragons | 8 September 2023, 19:30 | The Be Well Support Stadium | Aaron Moore | 3,348 |
| Huddersfield Giants | 18–26 | Hull KR | 8 September 2023, 19:45 | John Smiths Stadium | Tom Grant | 4,628 |
| Castleford Tigers | 29–12 | Hull FC | 8 September 2023, 20:00 | The Mend-A-Hose a Jungle | Ben Thaler | 7,947 |
| St Helens | 22–12 | Leigh Leopards | 8 September 2023, 20:00 | Totally Wicked Stadium | Chris Kendall | 13,428 |
| Leeds Rhinos | 0–50 | Wigan Warriors | 9 September 2023, 14:45 | Headingley | Jack Smith | 12,861 |
| Salford Red Devils † | 24–20 | Warrington Wolves | 10 September 2023, 12:45 | AJ Bell Stadium | Liam Moore | 6,252 |

† = after extra time

=== Round 26 ===
| Home | Score | Away | Match information |
| Home | Score | Away | Date and time (BST) | Venue | Referee | Attendance |
|---|---|---|---|---|---|---|
| Leigh Leopards † | 20–19 | Wakefield Trinity | 15 September 2023, 20:00 | Leigh Sports Village | Tom Grant | 5,565 |
| Warrington Wolves | 6–18 | St Helens | 15 September 2023, 20:00 | Halliwell Jones Stadium | Jack Smith | 12,855 |
| Wigan Warriors | 48–6 | Castleford Tigers | 15 September 2023, 20:00 | DW Stadium | Chris Kendall | 13,109 |
| Hull FC | 20–52 | Huddersfield Giants | 16 September 2023, 15:00 | MKM Stadium | James Vella |
| Catalans Dragons | 61–0 | Leeds Rhinos | 16 September 2023, 18:00 | Stade Gilbert Brutus | Ben Thaler |
| Hull KR | 12–0 | Salford Red Devils | 16 September 2023, 19:30 | Sewell Group Craven Park | Liam Moore |

† Match decided in extra time.

=== Round 27 ===
| Home | Score | Away | Match information |
| Home | Score | Away | Date and time (BST) | Venue | Referee | Attendance |
|---|---|---|---|---|---|---|
| Huddersfield Giants | 8–20 | Warrington Wolves | 22 September 2023, 20:00 | John Smiths Stadium | Tom Grant | 5,656 |
| Leeds Rhinos | 46–0 | Castleford Tigers | 22 September 2023, 20:00 | Headingley | James Vella | 15,000 |
| Leigh Leopards | 6–10 | Wigan Warriors | 22 September 2023, 20:00 | Leigh Sports Village | Liam Moore | 10,308 |
| Salford Red Devils | 8–19 | Catalans Dragons | 22 September 2023, 20:00 | AJ Bell Stadium | Jack Smith | 4,250 |
| St Helens | 30–12 | Hull FC | 22 September 2023, 20:00 | Totally Wicked Stadium | Ben Thaler | 14,036 |
| Wakefield Trinity | 12–56 | Hull KR | 22 September 2023, 20:00 | The Be Well Support Stadium | Chris Kendall | 4,700 |

== Play-offs ==
=== Team bracket ===
Eliminators
4 | Hull KR | 20
5 | Leigh | 6
3 | St Helens | 16
6 | Warrington | 8

Semi-finals
2 | Catalans | 12
3 | St Helens | 6
1 | Wigan | 42
4 | Hull KR | 12

Grand Final
1 | Wigan | 10
2 | Catalans | 2

=== Summary ===
| Home | Score | Away | Match Information |
| Home | Score | Away | Date and Time (Local) | Venue | Referee | Attendance |
|---|---|---|---|---|---|---|
Eliminators
| Hull KR | 20–6 | Leigh Leopards | 29 September 2023, 20:00 | Sewell Group Craven Park | Jack Smith |
| St Helens | 16–8 | Warrington Wolves | 30 September 2023, 12:45 | Totally Wicked Stadium | Ben Thaler | 13,801 |
Semi-finals
| Catalans Dragons | 12–6 | St Helens | 6 October 2023, 20:00 | Stade Gilbert Brutus | Chris Kendall | 11,530 |
| Wigan Warriors | 42–12 | Hull KR | 7 October 2022, 12:45 | DW Stadium | Liam Moore | 15,162 |
Grand Final
| Wigan Warriors | – | Catalans Dragons | 14 October 2023, 18:00 | Old Trafford | Liam Moore |
