= Skinny Food Co =

British food and beverage brand

- Company type: Private Limited
- Industry: Food processing
- Founded: 1 February 2018; 8 years ago
- Founders: Wayne Starkie; James Whiting
- Headquarters: Nottingham, United Kingdom
- Products: Diet foods
- Revenue: ▲£19million (2022)
- Website: theskinnyfoodco.com

Skinny Food Co is a British food and beverage brand owned by 'Not Guilty Food Co', based in Nottingham, England. It was founded in 2018 by Wayne Starkie and James Whiting. As of 2022, the company reported annual revenue of over £19m.

== History ==
Not Guilty Food Co was established in 2018 by Wayne Starkie and James Whiting with a focus on creating healthier alternative versions to popular high in saturated fat, salt and sugar (HFSS) junk foods. The company was initially launched with a range of sugar-free zero-calorie syrups and condiments that are water-based and artificially sweetened.

The company sells products directly to consumers through their website, but has also expanded to a range of UK supermarkets, including Spar in 2019, Morrisons in 2020, Lidl in 2021, Asda in 2022 and Tesco in 2023. Skinny Food Co products are also available in health food stores such as Holland & Barrett and discount shops such as B&M and TK Maxx.

In 2021, founder Jame Whiting was named in the Forbes 30 under 30 in the retail and e-commerce category.

In 2022 the company was listed eighteenth on The Sunday Times 100 list of fastest growing companies in the UK.

The Skinny Food Co brand has also undertaken sponsorship deals with professional sports clubs in the Midlands and North of England, including football clubs Huddersfield Town AFC, Birmingham City FC, Hull City AFC and Nottingham Forest FC.

== Products ==
The company's products initially focussed on sauces and syrups, however they are now reported to manufacture over 200 lines, mostly low-sugar and low-calorie foods, including:

- Zero Calorie Syrups - Sugar-free syrups for use in breakfasts, desserts and drinks
- Skinny Sauces - Low calorie, fat-free and sugar-free condiments
- Skinny Spreads - Sugar-free chocolate spreads and fruit preserves
- Chocoholic Collection - Low-sugar chocolate bars and other confectionery
- Carb Alternative Options - Low-carbohydrate versions of bread, noodles, rice and pasta
- Baking Kits - Low-sugar baking mixes for cookies and cakes

== Criticisms and controversies ==
The brand has had four rulings upheld against them with the Advertising Standards Authority. These focused on a range of advertising claims, including a blanket use of “zero calorie” terminology in ranges with a low calorific content, misleading comparisons of the sugar content of fruits in relation to their products, and their misrepresentation of positive reviews.

In 2019, the brand drew criticism when an advertising campaign with television personality and former model Katie Price utilised her children on her social media channels.

In July 2021, The Skinny Food Co recalled a variety of Skinny High Protein Low Sugar Duo Bars because they contain milk which is not correctly declared on the label.

In August 2021, it was reported that Swedish vegan food brand Oatly, had opposed the company's attempt to register a trademark for “Skinny Barista”.
