= Totally Wicked =

British electronic cigarette company

Totally Wicked is an electronic cigarette company from Blackburn, England. Established by Jason Cropper in 2008, he was succeeded as chief executive in 2013 by his brother Fraser. In June 2025, it was announced that the company had been sold to Wittyace UK Holding. The company has sponsored the stadium of St Helens R.F.C. and the kit of Blackburn Rovers F.C.

== History ==
Totally Wicked was founded on 8 October 2008 by Jason Cropper, five years after Hon Lik had patented the modern electronic cigarette. The company opened its first High Street store in 2011 and began expanding in 2013.

In June 2013, Jason Cropper resigned as chief executive after sending e-mails to a Member of the European Parliament and to the Medicines and Healthcare products Regulatory Agency (MHRA), in which he doubted their motives for attempting to restrict electronic cigarettes. He retained 83% of the stock of the company, and his brother Fraser succeeded him as chief executive. Pillbox 38, the parent company of Totally Wicked, donated £25,000 to the UK Independence Party (UKIP) in May 2013, and Jason Cropper donated £11,000 in July; UKIP leader Nigel Farage then defended electronic cigarettes in the European Parliament.

In 2016, Totally Wicked founded the Independent British Vaping Trade Association (IBVTA). BBC News reported in 2018 that Totally Wicked was the largest chain of vaping stores, with 140 outlets in the UK. As of 2022, the company had over 400 stores, as well as selling inside Asda, Sainsbury's and Bargain Booze. It had over 140 direct employees, and a turnover of £43.5 million for the year ending 31 March 2021. In August 2019, Totally Wicked agreed a deal for its products to be sold in 445 WHSmith stores.

Totally Wicked opposed government plans to ban single-use disposable electronic cigarettes, believing that it would cause a black market of unsafe products.

In the 12 months up to April 2024, Totally Wicked made a pre-tax profit of £8.1 million, compared to £3.3 million for the previous year, and its turnover increased from £90.4 million to a record £118.1 million.

In June 2025, it was revealed on Companies House that Fraser Cropper sold Totally Wicked to Wittyace UK Holding, owned by Chinese national Ying Wang in Hong Kong and registered in Cambridge. Cropper stood down as director. While financial details were not disclosed, the new owner took over 75% of the shares.

== Sponsorship ==
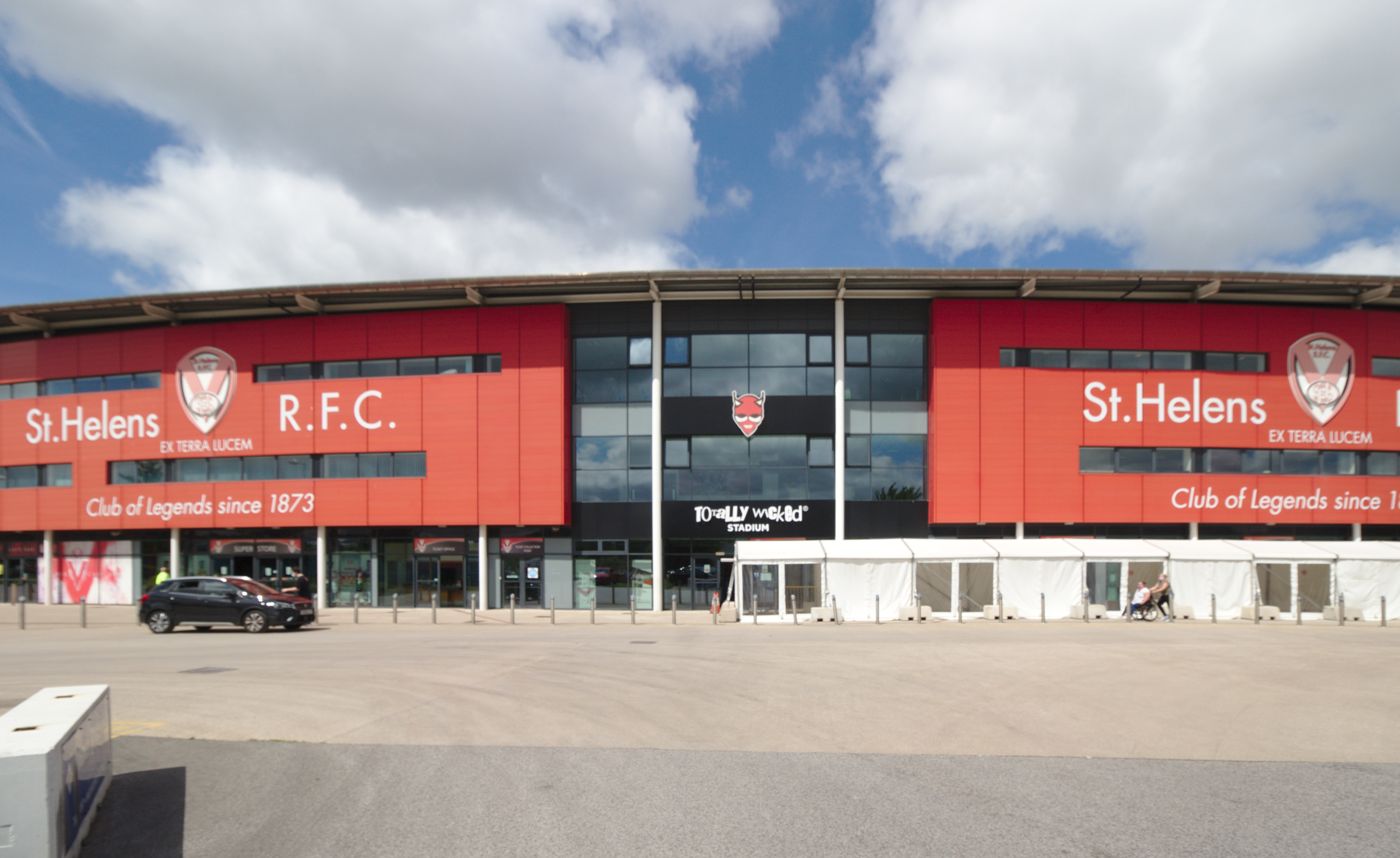
St Helens R.F.C.'s stadium in 2021, with Totally Wicked sponsorship

In 2013, Totally Wicked became the sponsor of the north stand at St Helens R.F.C.'s Langtree Park stadium. In November 2016, the stadium was renamed the Totally Wicked Stadium on a five-year deal. The deal was extended until 2025; the company cited National Institute for Health and Care Research and Cancer Research UK statistics that smoking had declined at one of the fastest national rates in St Helens, Merseyside over the period of sponsorship.

Totally Wicked sponsored the training kits of Blackburn Rovers F.C. from 2018, becoming the primary sponsor in January 2022 due to an early end to the previous sponsor. The company sponsored the club on one-year rolling contracts, ending in June 2024.

The sponsorship was criticised by Members of Parliament from both the Conservative and Labour parties over concerns that it could encourage children to use electronic cigarettes. Totally Wicked and Blackburn Rovers said that there was no evidence that children had been attracted to the brand, and that electronic cigarettes aid in smoking cessation. The law did not permit Blackburn Rovers to sell children's shirts featuring the Totally Wicked logo, nor for players aged under 18 to wear them.
