= BrewDog Stadium =

Rugby league stadium, St Helens, Merseyside, England

- St Helens Stadium
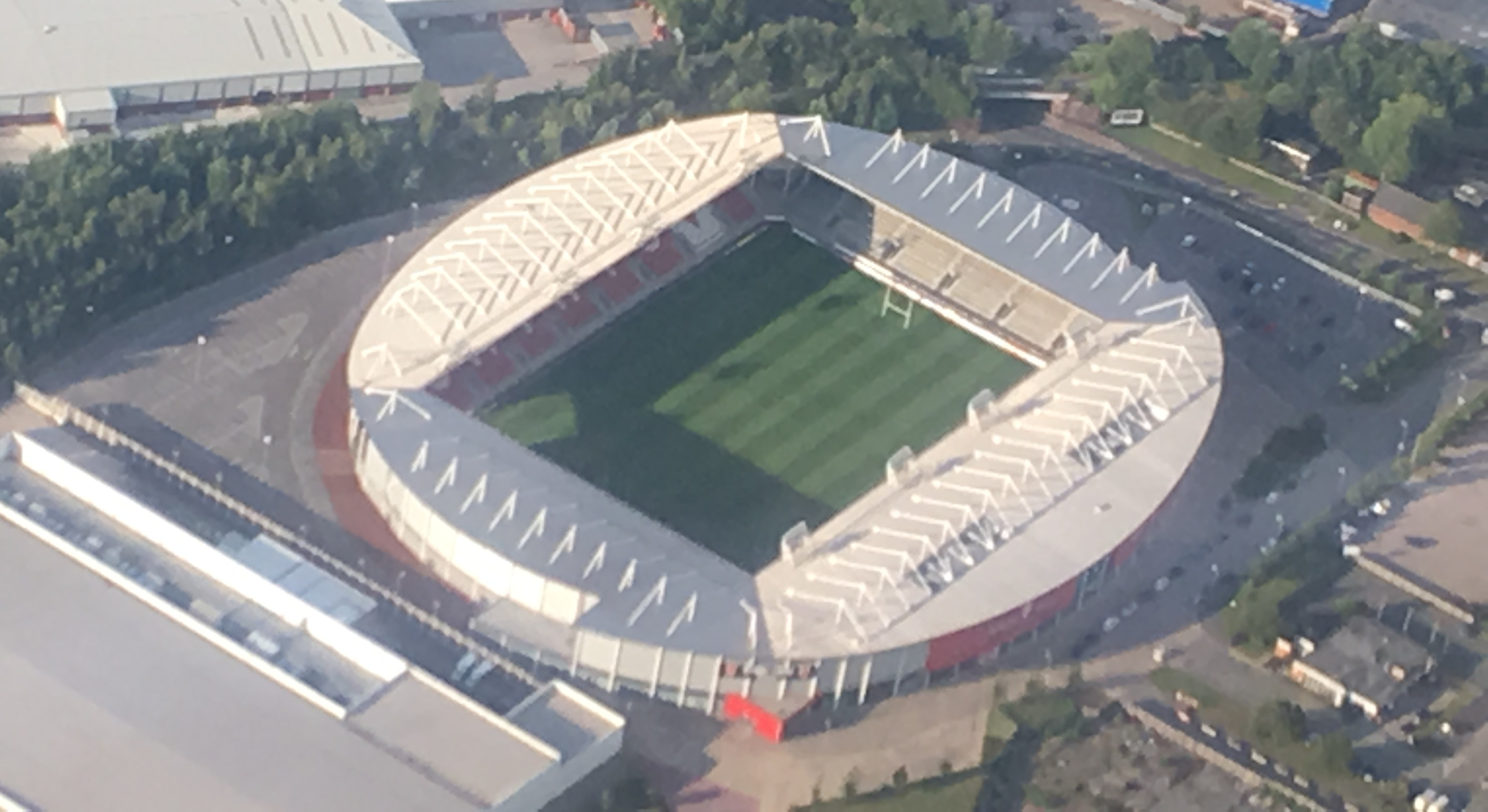
- Interactive map of BrewDog Stadium
- Full name: BrewDog Stadium
- Former names: Langtree Park (2012–2017) Totally Wicked Stadium (2017–2025)
- Location: BrewDog Stadium; McManus Drive; Peasley Cross; St Helens; WA9 3AL
- Coordinates: 53°26′51″N 2°43′39″W
- Owner: St Helens R.F.C.
- Operator: St Helens R.F.C.
- Capacity: 18,000
- Surface: Hybrid Desso
- Record attendance: 17,980 (St. Helens vs Wigan 6 April 2012) (St. Helens vs Wigan 18 April 2014)

Construction
- Built: 2010–2011
- Opened: 2011
- Cost: £25 Million
- Architect: Barr Construction
- Main contractor: Langtree Group

Tenants
- St. Helens (2011–present); Liverpool F.C. Women (2024–present)

Website
- https://www.brewdogstadium.com/

BrewDog Stadium is a multi-purpose stadium in St Helens, Merseyside, England. Previously known as the Totally Wicked Stadium, between 2017 and 2025, and as Langtree Park between 2012 and 2017, it has a capacity of over 18,000 and is the home ground of rugby league club St Helens R.F.C. and football club Liverpool F.C. Women. The stadium was granted planning permission in 2008 and construction started in 2010.

The first rugby league match played at the stadium was between St. Helens and Widnes on Friday 20 January 2012. St. Helens won the opening game by 42–24 and moved in ready for the 2012 Super League season.

From the 2024–25 season, Liverpool FC Women play at the stadium, after signing a 10 year deal.

== Plans and construction ==
The proposed plans came in three parts. The proposed parts were:

1. The transformation of the derelict former United Glass site to create a new 18,000-capacity stadium for St. Helens as well as a 140,000 sq ft (13,000 m^{2}) Tesco Extra next to the rugby ground. The stadium itself was to be a seating and standing arena with an oval shaped roof extending out from the south stand.
2. The redevelopment of the existing town centre Tesco store in Chalon Way into alternative high quality retail use, enhancing the retail available in St Helens town centre.
3. The development of the existing St. Helens site at Knowsley Road to create high quality residential accommodation, regenerating the local area.

The club stressed that if one of the three parts fell through, the whole project would have been in jeopardy. However councillors in St Helens approved the new Saints' stadium. Members of the Planning Committee endorsed the triple planning application granting permission subject to terms and conditions and a health and safety risk assessment

Demolition of the former UGB Glass plant began in late January 2009, with construction due to begin after the clearance of the 46-acre (190,000 m^{2}) site had been completed. In July 2010, the building contractor Barr Construction Ltd was selected to build the new stadium. Construction commenced on 23 August 2010, with the Tesco store completed in October 2011 and the stadium in November 2011.

In the initial build, the North, East and West stands would be exposed from the rear with a gap between the walls and roof. During the 2012 and 2013 seasons, fans complained of the open air nature of stands. During bad weather the concourse behind the stands would become slippery and gusts would form on the concourses. In August 2013 cladding was added to the stands to protect fans inside the ground from wind and rain.

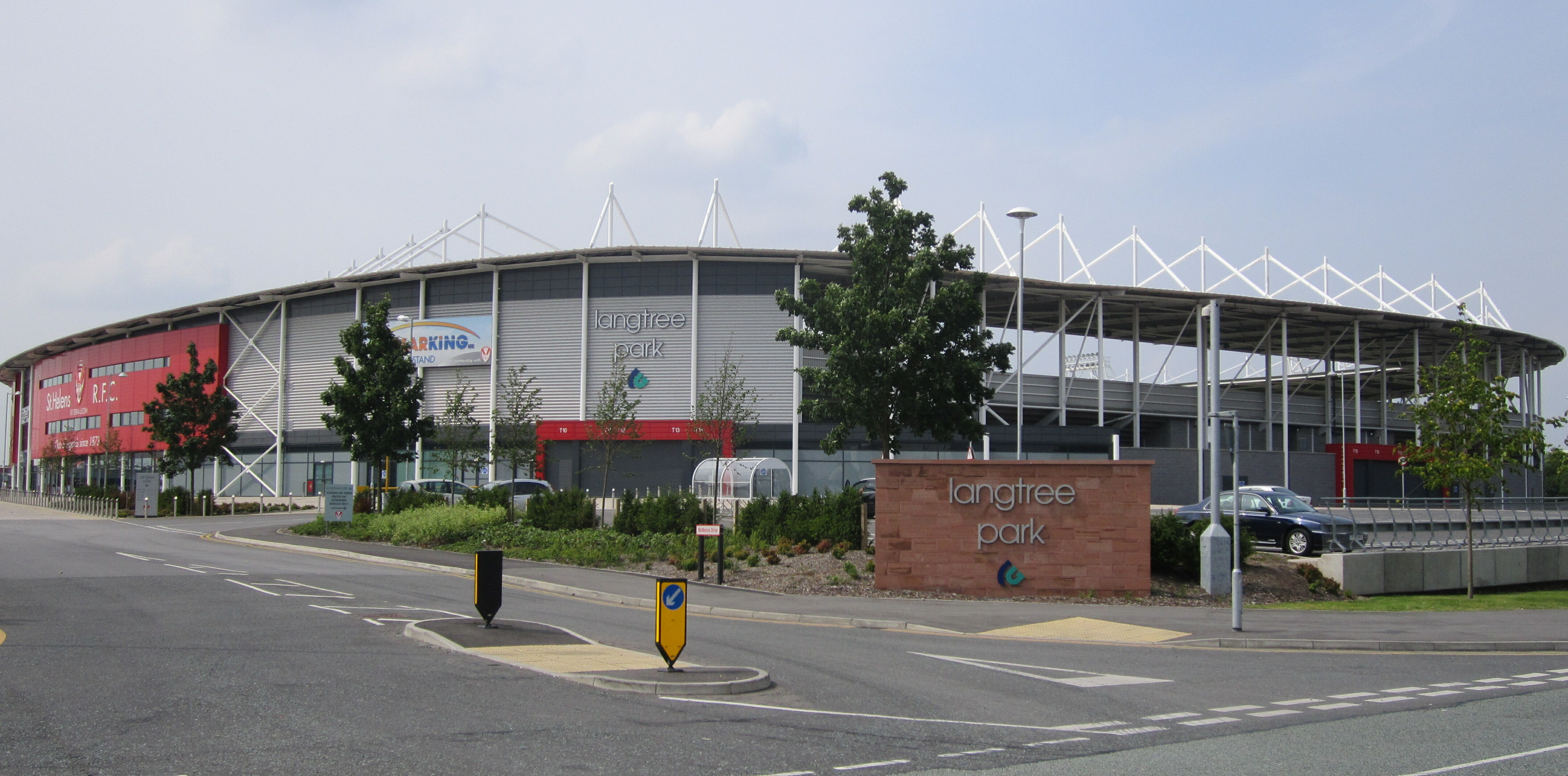
Entrance to Langtree Park in 2012

== Layout ==
The stadium has two terraced stands and two seated, the pitch is grass although the touchline has some astro-turf. The match day hospitality consists of the sale of the Saints Gold beer which is served inside the ground at a number of kiosks and in the Redvee cafe bar. The stadium has a large Saints badge on the outside with the recently restored town motto: Ex Terra Lucem underneath. A bronze statue of former club captain Keiron Cunningham stands over the main entrance.

The stadium can be accessed via a number of routes, including the Steve Prescott bridge, named in memory of Steve Prescott MBE, a former St. Helens and Hull F.C. player renowned for his fund raising contributions to charity.

=== North Stand ===
Capacity – 4,718 (seated)
The North Stand runs parallel to the South Stand along the side of the pitch. The stand is completely seated and has SAINTS V spelt out in the seats and is occupied by home fans.

=== South Stand ===
Capacity – 5,233 (seated)
The South Stand is the main stand of the ground and holds the club's hospitality boxes, tunnel and player changing rooms, ticket office, bar and club shop as well as the TV gantry.

=== East Stand ===
Capacity – 3,899 (standing)
The East Stand is located behind the goal posts and is completely terraced. The stand also houses the score board in the North East corner and the stand is used by away fans.

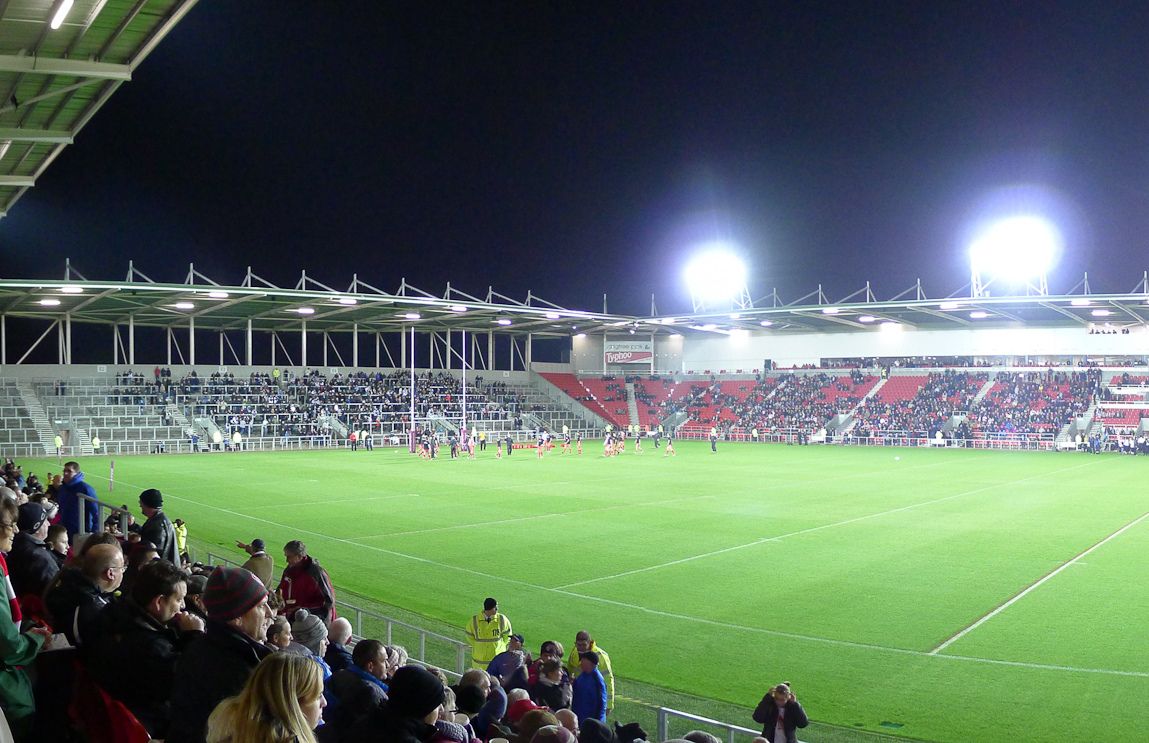
East Stand of Langtree Park on opening night in January 2012

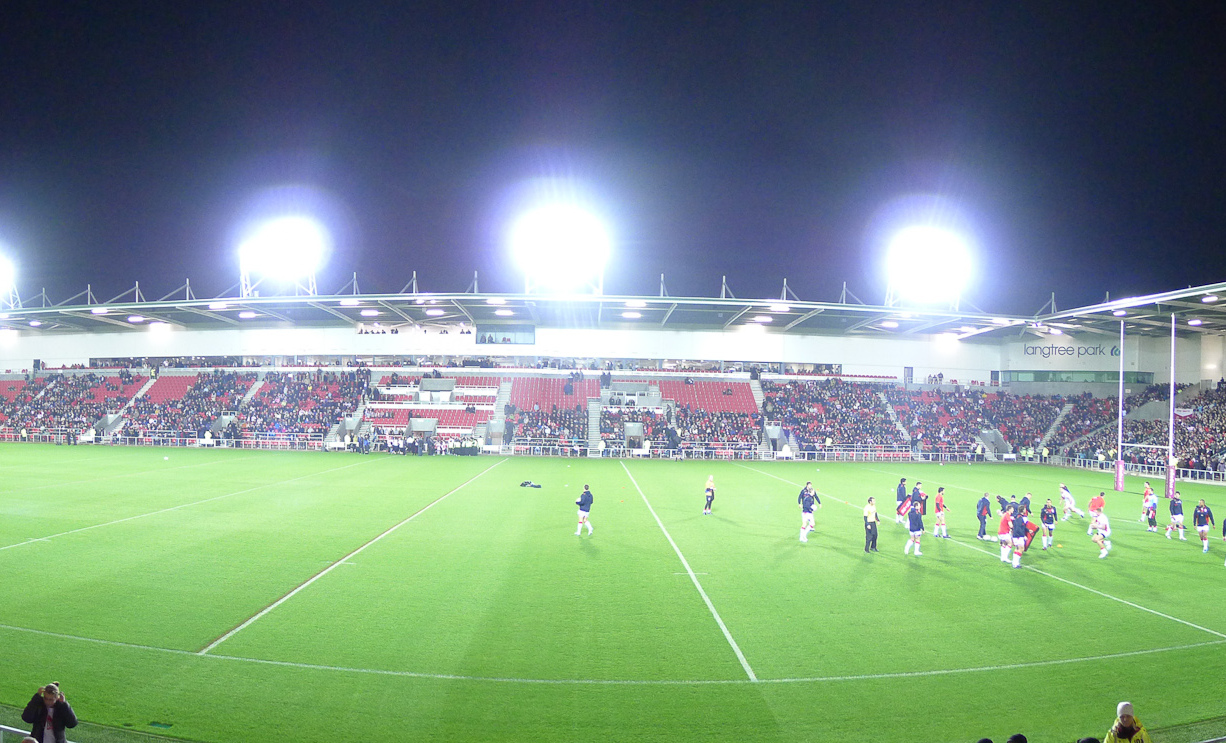
North Stand of Langtree Park on opening night in January 2012

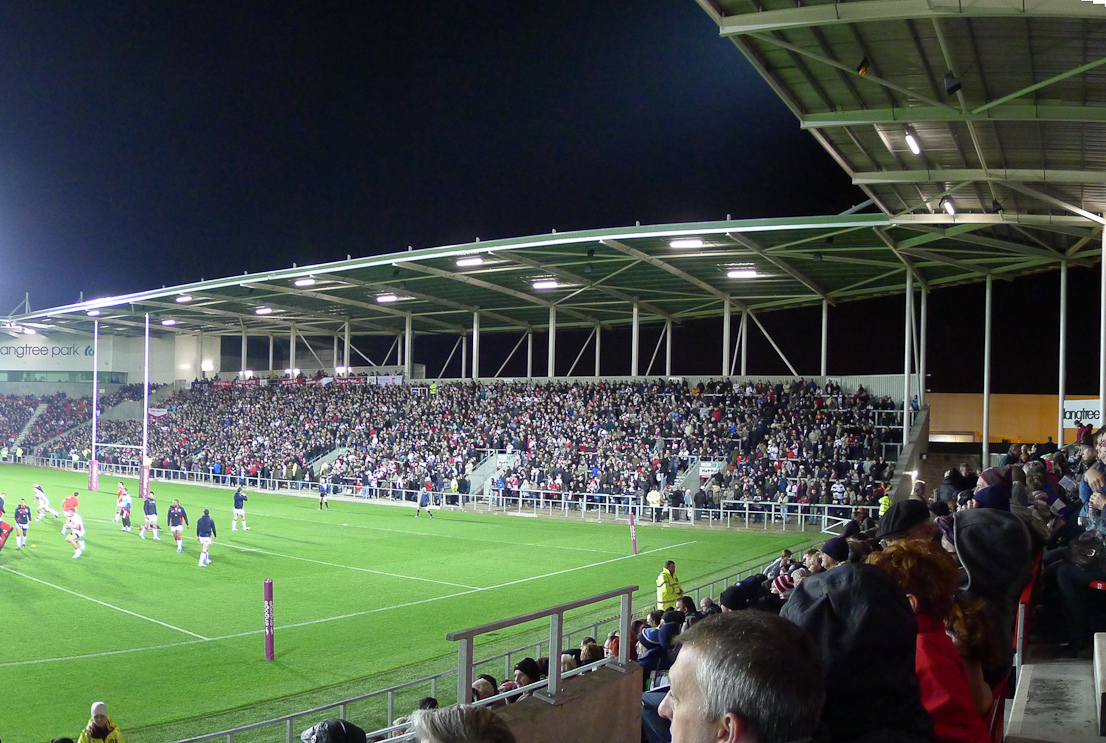
West Stand of Langtree Park on opening night in January 2012

=== West Stand ===
Capacity – 3,796 (118 seats)
The West Stand is mostly terracing but also has 118 seated in the corner of the stand.

== Usage ==
=== Rugby league ===
St Helens played their first league game at the ground in 2012, when they won against Salford. Their record victory at the stadium was 82-0 against Salford in round 1 of the 2025 season. The highest recorded attendance for a match so far was 17,980 against Wigan on 6 April, with an average attendance of 14,212 for the 2012 season.

The venue hosted the first of two Rugby league International Origin match in 2012 between England and the Exiles. Langtree Park held a group match in the 2013 Rugby League World Cup between Australia and Fiji. The stadium hosted three group games in the 2021 Rugby League World Cup.

The stadium also hosted the opening match of the 2023 Tonga rugby league tour of England.

Date	Winner	Score	Runners up	Competition	Attendance
16 June 2012	England	18-10	Exiles	International Origin	11,083
16 June 2012	England Knights	62-4	Ireland	Friendly	11,083
2 November 2013	Australia	34-2	Fiji	2013 World Cup	14,137
18 October 2022	Tonga	24-18	Papua New Guinea	2021 World Cup	10,409
24 October 2022	Tonga	32-6	Wales	2021 World Cup	7,752
29 October 2022	Australia	66-6	Italy	2021 World Cup	5,586
23 October 2023	England	22-18	Tonga	2023 Tonga rugby league tour of England	12,898

The stadium played host to the Challenge Cup Semi Final between Warrington and Leeds on 9 August 2014.

=== Association football ===
All of Liverpool U19s NextGen matches in the 2012–13 season were held at Langtree Park, as were many Under 21s matches.

In 2024, Liverpool FC Women began playing at the BrewDog Stadium, moving from Prenton Park. The stadium was re-branded, to cater to both St Helens and LFC Women. Because of this new partnership, the pitch was replaced with a "Premier League standard pitch".

=== Concerts ===
The BrewDog Stadium hosts major concerts with a capacity of 25,000. Past performances include Jacqui Abbott & Paul Heaton in 2022 and The Who with a full orchestra in 2023.

== Sponsorship ==
Prior to the opening of the stadium, it was announced on 15 November 2011 that the stadium's primary developers, the Langtree Group, had gained the naming rights, resulting in the stadium being named Langtree Park.

In 2016, St Helens signed a five-year deal with Totally Wicked, a vaping and e-cigarettes company, for the naming rights to the stadium, effective in early 2017. In April 2022, the deal with Totally Wicked was extended until 2025.

The stadium rebranded to the BrewDog Stadium in October 2025 following the agreement of a ten year partnership between St Helens and multinational brewery BrewDog.

The stadium is also referred to as the "St Helens Stadium" when in use by Liverpool FC Women.

Year	Sponsor	Name
2012–2016	Langtree Group	Langtree Park
2017–2025	Totally Wicked	Totally Wicked Stadium
2025–present	BrewDog	BrewDog Stadium
