= 2004–05 SC Heerenveen season =

SC Heerenveen
2004–05 season
- Chairman: (Netherlands) Riemer van der Velde
- Manager: (Netherlands) Gertjan Verbeek
- Stadium: Alkmaarderhout
- Eredivisie: 5th
- KNVB Cup: Round of 16
- UEFA Cup: Round of 32
- Top goalscorer: Klaas-Jan Huntelaar (16)
- Highest home attendance: 21,000
- Average home league attendance: 18,436

During the 2004–05 Dutch football season, AZ Alkmaar competed in the Eredivisie.

== Season summary ==
In Gertjan Verbeek's first season in charge, Heerenveen dropped one place to finish 5th, qualifying yet again for the UEFA Cup.

== First-team squad ==
Squad at end of season

Note: Flags indicate national team as defined under FIFA eligibility rules; some limited exceptions apply. Players may hold more than one non-FIFA nationality.

No.	Pos.	Nation	Player
2	DF	NED	Said Bakkati
3	DF	SWE	Petter Hansson
4	DF	NED	Michel Breuer
5	DF	NED	Marcel Seip
6	MF	POL	Arkadiusz Radomski
7	MF	NOR	Daniel Berg Hestad
8	MF	FIN	Mika Väyrynen (Note: Väyrynen was born in Eskilstuna, Sweden, but was raised in Finland and made his international debut for Finland in March 2002.)
10	FW	SWE	Lasse Nilsson
11	MF	NOR	André Hanssen
12	MF	NED	Yuri Rose
14	DF	POL	Tomasz Rząsa
15	DF	NED	Klaas-Jan Huntelaar
16	MF	BEL	Spencer Verbiest
17	MF	NED	Uğur Yıldırım

No.	Pos.	Nation	Player
18	DF	NED	Jos Hooiveld
19	MF	NED	Victor Sikora (on loan from Ajax)
20	FW	GRE	Georgios Samaras
21	MF	NED	Arnold Bruggink
22	DF	FIN	Hannu Haarala
23	MF	AUT	Thomas Prager
24	GK	NED	Boy Waterman
26	GK	BEL	Brian Vandenbussche
28	DF	NED	Jerrel Wolfgang
29	DF	NED	Jeroen Drost
30	DF	NED	Henrico Drost
32	MF	NED	Oğuzhan Türk
37	MF	NED	Joey van den Berg
40	FW	MDA	Denis Calincov

=== Left club during season ===
Note: Flags indicate national team as defined under FIFA eligibility rules; some limited exceptions apply. Players may hold more than one non-FIFA nationality.

No.	Pos.	Nation	Player
3	FW	NED	Santi Kolk (to Feyenoord)
9	MF	NED	Youssouf Hersi (Note: Hersi was born in Dire Dawa, Ethiopia, but was raised in the Netherlands from the age of 7 and represented the Netherlands at every youth level from U-16 to U-21.) (to Vitesse)
10	MF	SWE	Stefan Selaković (on loan to Göteborg)

No.	Pos.	Nation	Player
11	MF	NED	Paul de Lange (to RBC Roosendaal)
21	MF	DEN	Jesper Håkansson (on loan to RBC Roosendaal)
