= 2016–17 Reading F.C. season =

Reading F.C.
2016–17 season
- Manager: Jaap Stam
- Stadium: Madejski Stadium
- Championship: 3rd
- Play-offs: Runners-up (eliminated by Huddersfield Town)
- FA Cup: Third round (eliminated by Manchester United)
- EFL Cup: Fourth round (eliminated by Arsenal)
- Top goalscorer: League: Yann Kermorgant (18); All: Yann Kermorgant (19)
- Highest home attendance: 23,055 vs Leeds United (1 April 2017)
- Lowest home attendance: 6,848 vs Milton Keynes (23 August 2016; EFL Cup)
- Average home league attendance: 17,481, League; 16,636, All
Home colours	Away colours

The 2016–17 season was Reading's 146th year in existence and fourth consecutive season in the Championship, and covers the period from 1 July 2016 to 30 June 2017. Reading finished 3rd in the league, qualifying for the play-offs, eventually losing to Huddersfield Town in the final on penalties.

== Season review ==
=== Pre-season ===
On 26 May, Reading announced a pre-season friendly against local rivals Swindon Town on 19 July, and against Boreham Wood on 3 July. The following day the club released manager Brian McDermott of his duties, whilst also announcing a pre-season friendly against Premier League side Bournemouth. On 31 May, Reading announced their fourth pre-season friendly, an away trip to Lincoln City on July 16, 2016.

On 13 June, Reading announced Jaap Stam as their new manager, replacing Brian McDermott who was fired at the end of May. Four days later Reading extended their sponsorship deal with Carabao Daeng for another three seasons.

On 21 June, Reading announced that Academy Manager Eamonn Dolan had died following a battle with cancer.

Reading announced on 7 July that they would be travelling to Oosterbeek, Netherlands for a weeklong training camp, with a friendly against Saudi Professional League side Al-Taawoun on 15 July. This meant Martin Kuhl would manage the fixture against Lincoln City on 16 July 2016 as the rest of the squad would be returning home on that same day.

On 26 July, Reading announced that they had accepted an invitation to enter their Category One Academy in the revamped EFL Trophy, being drawn against Bristol Rovers, Portsmouth and Yeovil Town the following day. On 28 July, the U23 side wear drawn against Everton, Athletic Bilbao and Hertha BSC in the Premier League International Cup.

==== Transfers ====
Following the conclusion of the 2015–16 season, Reading announced on 9 May 2016 that they would not be renewing the contracts of Anton Ferdinand, Hal Robson-Kanu, Simon Cox, Nana Owusu, Pierce Sweeney, Lewis Collins, Noor Husin, Hammad Lawal, Samúel Friðjónsson, Conor Shaughnessy and Bogdan Vashchuk. Friðjónsson went on to sign a three-and-a-half-year contract with Norwegian Tippeligaen side Vålerenga on 16 June 2016, with Cox joining Southend United on 16 July 2016 and Sweeney joining Exeter City on 28 July 2016.

Also on 9 May 2016, Reading offered new contracts to Dominic Hyam, Robert Dickie, Shane Griffin, Sean Long, Aaron Kuhl, Liam Kelly, Zak Jules and George Legg, as well as Under-18 players Omar Richards, Harrison Bennett, Ryan East, Sam Smith, Luke Southwood, Billy Collings and Joe Tupper.

On 25 May 2016, Reading announced that they had signed Danzell Gravenberch on a three-year contract from FC Dordrecht, with the transfer to be confirmed upon the opening of the transfer window on 1 July 2016. During June, Reading were linked with Joey van den Berg, Tyler Blackett, and Tim Matavž. On 28 June, Van den Berg signed a two-year contract, which was completed upon the opening of the transfer window on 1 July.

As well as the transfers of Gravenberch and van den Berg being completed on 1 July, Reading announced that youngsters Lewis Ward, Zak Jules, George Legg, Sean Long, Shane Griffin, Liam Kelly, Aaron Kuhl, Robert Dickie, Dominic Hyam, Ryan East, Harrison Bennett, Joe Tupper, Billy Collings, Omar Richards, Luke Southward and Thomas McIntyre had all signed deals to stay with the club.

On 4 July, forward Rowan Liburd left the club on a permanent transfer, joining Stevenage for an undisclosed fee. Four days later, 8 July, Reading signed Joseph Mendes from Le Havre on a two-year contract for an undisclosed fee.

Aaron Tshibola left the club for Aston Villa on 10 July, for an undisclosed fee. The following day it was announced that Finnish goalkeeper Anssi Jaakkola had signed from Ajax Cape Town on a two-year deal. On 14 July, Reading signed John Swift to a three-year contract following his release from Chelsea, with Roy Beerens joining two days later on a three-year contract from Hertha BSC.

On 28 July, youngster Sean Long joined Cambridge United on a six-month loan deal, with Yakou Méïte joining on a three-year deal from Paris Saint-Germain the following day.

=== August ===
Reading started the season with a 1–0 home win over Preston North End on 6 August thanks to a goal from John Swift on his debut, before following it up with a 2–0 victory over Plymouth Argyle in the EFL Cup three days later, with goals from Joey van den Berg and Roy Beerens. Reading's first defeat of the season came on 13 August, where they lost 0–2 to Wolverhampton Wanderers at Molineux. Reading suffered their second defeat of the season on 17 August, a 4–1 away defeat to Newcastle United. Reading came from behind to earn a 2–2 draw against Brighton & Hove Albion on 20 August, and a further 2–2 draw, against Milton Keynes Dons on 23 August, saw Reading advance to the third round of the EFL Cup after winning 4–2 on penalties.

Reading's last match of the month was on 27 August, where they saw a 0–1 away win at Cardiff after an 89th-minute goal by Yann Kermorgant.

==== Transfers ====
On 3 August, Paolo Hurtado returned to Vitória de Guimarães on a season-long loan, Lewis Ward joined Margate until 3 January 2017, George Legg joined Hungerford Town on a season-long loan, and Oliver Norwood moved to Brighton & Hove Albion on a three-year contract for an undisclosed fee. On 5 August, winger Callum Harriott signed a three-year contract, moving from Charlton Athletic for an undisclosed fee.

Reading loaned Craig Tanner to Plymouth Argyle, and signed Liechtenstein international midfielder Sandro Wieser to a three-year contract the next day. On 19 August, youngster Aaron Kuhl moved to National League side Boreham Wood on loan until 28 January 2017, whilst defender Liam Moore became the club's tenth summer signing, joining the club from Leicester City the next day on a four-year contract. Tyler Blackett was signed to a three-year deal on 22 August.

On 25 August, Robert Dickie returned to Cheltenham Town on loan until 2 January 2017. Goalkeeper Jonathan Bond joined Gillingham on loan on 26 August, until 7 January 2017.

Near the end of the August, Reading where linked with a loan-move for Ghanaian Captain Asamoah Gyan from Shanghai SIPG, with the striker undertaking a medical at the club on 29 August. The following day, Reading backed out of the deal due to Gyan failing a medical.

On transfer deadline day, 31 August, Jack Stacey joined Exeter City on loan until 23 January 2017, Tarique Fosu joined Colchester United on loan until 7 January 2017, and Dominic Hyam joined Portsmouth until 8 January 2017.

During the summer transfer window, Portuguese youngster Lisandro Semedo left the club, joining AEZ Zakakiou in the Cypriot First Division.

=== September ===
Reading's first match in September was a 2–1 league win against Ipswich at the Madejski Stadium on 9 September, in which all three goals came from penalties. Reading's two were taken by Garath McCleary and Danny Williams, who scored in first- and second-half injury time respectively. A midweek home tie against Birmingham on 13 September gave Reading one point from the 0–0 draw, and a 1–2 away win at Barnsley the following weekend saw Reading move to eighth place in the Championship, drawing on points with sixth-place Brentford. Reading progressed to the fourth round of the EFL Cup after a 1–2 away win against Brighton and Hove Albion on 20 September. The draw for the round took place on 21 September, with Reading drawn against Arsenal.

Reading saw a third consecutive win—and a continuation of their eight-match unbeaten run—on 24 September with a 1–0 home win against Huddersfield, with Reading rising to fourth in the league.

At the end of September, midfielder Érico Sousa joined the club on trial, featuring in the clubs U23 Development League fixture against Derby County on 26 September.

Reading's last game of the month was away at Brentford, which also saw the eight-game unbeaten run end after a 4–1 defeat.

=== October ===
On 1 October Reading hosted Derby County in a match that saw four former Reading players—Matěj Vydra, Alex Pearce, Nick Blackman and Chris Baird—return to the Madejski Stadium. Vydra gave Derby the lead in the second half, although Reading equalised through George Evans in the 90th minute. The draw continued Reading's undefeated run at home. A further draw came after the international break, when on 15 October a 1–1 result at Queens Park Rangers took Reading to 7th in the league. A home loss on 18 October against Aston Villa brought the end of Reading's unbeaten home run. Despite holding a 1–1 draw since the early stages of the second half, Reading conceded a penalty in the 90th minute, with the resultant goal giving Aston Villa their first away win in over a year. Reading's final two league games of the month came on 22 and 29 October, where they beat Rotherham United 0–1 and Nottingham Forest 2–0. Reading were knocked out of the EFL Cup on 25 October following a 2–0 defeat to Arsenal at the Emirates Stadium.

On 6 October 2016 Icelandic U19 defender Sindri Scheving joined Cirencester Town on a one-month loan deal.

=== November ===
Reading began November with a 0–3 away win at Wigan Athletic, a result which saw them move up to 4th in the Championship. After the November international break, Reading recorded their fourth and fifth consecutive league wins, with 3–0 and 2–1 home victories against Burton Albion and Bristol City respectively, which saw them move up to 3rd in the league.

=== December ===
On 2 December, young Scottish defender Zak Jules joined Braintree Town on a month-long loan deal. Reading's winning run ended on 3 December with a 5–0 away loss to Fulham, during which Danny Williams received a red card; Reading however remained at third place. On 10 December Reading returned to winning form with a 2–1 home win against Sheffield Wednesday, although this was short-lived with a 2–0 away loss at Leeds United three days later.

Two consecutive wins followed, with a 2–3 away victory at Blackburn Rovers on 17 December and a 3–1 home victory against Norwich City on 26 December, results which saw Reading retain their 3rd-place position. Reading's final match of 2016 was at home against Fulham on 30 December. The scoreless game was abandoned by officials at half time due to dense fog, with the rescheduled match due to take place on 24 January 2017.

On 23 December, Icelandic youth international Axel Andrésson joined Bath City on loan until 25 February 2017, whilst academy graduate Liam Kelly signed a new contract, keeping him at the club until the summer of 2019, on 30 December.

=== January ===
Reading started 2017 with a 2–3 away win at Bristol City on 3 January. Trailing 2–0 until the final 20 minutes of the match, Reading scored three goals—including a stoppage-time strike by Kermogant—to ensure victory. On 5 January 2017, Ali Al-Habsi extended his contract with the club until the end of the 2018–19 season. Reading's FA Cup third round match against Manchester United took place at Old Trafford on 7 January. Manchester United took the lead in the 7th minute, when Wayne Rooney scored his 249th goal for the club, levelling the club record set by Bobby Charlton. Further goals from Anthony Martial and Marcus Rashford secured United's place in the fourth round with a 4–0 victory. On 12 January, Reading suffered their second home defeat of the season, when former Royal Jamie Mackie scored for Queens Park Rangers in their 0–1 victory. On 17 January, Garath McCleary extended his contract with the club until the summer of 2020. Reading had a second consecutive league defeat on 21 January, when they lost 3–2 away to Derby. Reading returned to winning form on 24 January at the rescheduled home fixture against Fulham. Beerens scored from the rebound of a John Swift penalty, and Al Habsi saved a 90th-minute Fulham penalty to give Reading a 1–0 win. Reading won again on 28 January at home to Cardiff City, which included goals from Swift and Kermogant. The month ended with a 0–1 away win at Birmingham City on 31 January.

==== Transfers ====
On 5 January 2017, Reading were linked with a move for Liverpool defender Tiago Ilori, whilst Sean Long joined Lincoln City on loan for the remainder of the 2016–17 season. On 12 January 2017, Tarique Fosu extended his loan deal with Colchester United until the end of the season. Tanner extended his stay with Plymouth Argyle until the end of the season on 16 January 2017, with Billy Collings moving to Brighton & Hove Albion the following day for an undisclosed fee. Ilori's move was announced on 18 January, with Jake Cooper joining Millwall on loan until the end of the season the following day, Jake Sheppard joining Dagenham & Redbridge on a youth-loan deal until the end of the season and Harrison Bennett joined Margate on a month-long youth-loan deal on 20 January.

On 21 January, Scottish youth international forward, Harry Cardwell, joined Brighton & Hove Albion on loan for the rest of the season, with Jack Stacey extending his loan-deal with Exeter City until the end of the season on 23 January. The following day Niall Keown joined Scottish Premiership side Partick Thistle on loan for the remainder of the season, whilst Zak Jules also headed north of the border on 27 January, joining Motherwell on loan until the end of the season.

Reading completed the signing of Romanian International Adrian Popa, on a three-and-a-half-year contract on 30 January, with Jordon Mutch, Reece Oxford and Lewis Grabban all joining on loan until the end of the season the following day.

Also on Transfer Deadline Day, Stuart Moore joined Luton Town and Dominic Samuel joined Ipswich Town on loan for the rest of the season.

=== February ===
February began with a 2–2 away draw with Ipswich Town; on the same day Shane Griffin signed for Cork City. On 9 February, Jaap Stam was nominated for January's manager of the month, winning it the following day. Also on 10 February, Yann Kermorgant signed a new one-year extension to his contract, keeping him at Reading until the summer of 2018.

On 11 February Reading again drew, hosting Barnsley in a goalless match.

On 13 February, Reading announced that academy players Ramarni Medford-Smith, Teddy Howe, Jordan Holsgrove and Tyler Frost, had all signed their first pro-contract with the club. The following day Reading returned to winning form with a 3–2 home win against Brentford.

On 17 February, Lewis Ward returned to Margate on an initial one-month loan deal, and Harrison Bennett extended his loan for another month.

Reading's final two matches of the month, on 21 and 25 February, were both away losses to Huddersfield (1–0) and Brighton and Hove Albion (3–0) respectively.

On 25 February 2017, youngster Terence Vancooten joined Basingstoke Town on loan for the rest of the season, with Bath City extending Axel Andrésson's loan deal until the end of the season on 28 February.

=== March ===
Owing to the international break, Reading only played four matches in March. On 4 March, Reading beat Wolverhampton Wanderers 2–0 at home, before holding then-league leaders Newcastle United to a 0–0 home draw on 7 March. Reading's only loss that month came on 11 March, with a 3–0 away defeat to Preston North End.

George Legg was recalled from his loan deal with Hungerford Town early, on 16 March, with Lewis Ward joining Hungerford Town the next day on loan until the end of the season. The same day, Reading travelled to Sheffield Wednesday where a 0–2 away win saw Adrian Popa run the length of the pitch in stoppage time to seal the victory.

On 23 March, Dominic Hyam joined Aldershot Town until the end of the season.

On 27 March, John Swift was nominated for the EFL Young Player of the Year.

=== April ===
Reading moved to 4th on 1 April after a 1–0 home win against Leeds saw the two teams swap league positions. A 3–1 home win against Blackburn Rovers on 4 April saw Reading briefly move to 3rd place prior to Huddersfield Town's 3–0 victory over Norwich City the following evening, which pushed Reading back to 4th. Reading's next match was a 7–1 away defeat to Norwich City on 8 April, in a game that saw six of Norwich's goals (as well as Kermogant's goal for Reading) scored before half time. Despite the loss, Reading retained their league position. The following day, the club announced that they had received conditional approval from the English Football League (EFL) for the takeover of the club by Dai Yongge and Dai Xiu Li. Two matches were played over the Easter bank holiday weekend. At the first, away to Aston Villa on 15 April, Reading returned to winning form with a 1–3 win. A consecutive victory occurred at the Madejski Stadium just 48 hours later, when Reading came from behind to beat already-relegated Rotherham United 2–1.

On 22 April Reading lost 3–2 away to Nottingham Forest, remaining in third place pending the result of Huddersfield Town's midweek game against Wolverhampton Wanderers.

A 1–0 home win against Wigan Athletic on 29 April guaranteed Reading's place in the play-offs.

=== May ===
On 4 May, Kermorgant was nominated for April's Championship Player of the Month, winning the award the following day.

Reading's final league game of the season was a 2–4 away win at Burton Albion on 7 May, which confirmed their play-off semi-final opponents would be Fulham. The away leg of this took place at Craven Cottage on 13 May, ending in a 1–1 draw. Jordan Obita opened the scoring in the second half, although Fulham equalised just over 10 minutes later. McShane received a red card for a high challenge, which suspended him for the upcoming home leg and potentially the play-off final.

On 12 May, Reading announced that they had offered new contracts to Jake Sheppard, Tarique Fosu, Zak Jules, Lewis Ward, Ryan East. Andy Rinomhota, Andrija Novakovich, Sam Smith and Luke Southwood, whilst George Legg and Axel Andrésson had already signed new deals. On the same day, Ethan Coleman, Tom Holmes, Danny Loader and Kosta Sparta signed their first professional deals with the club whilst Liam Driscoll, Ben House, Joel Rollinson and Ade Shokunbi were all also offered professional contracts.

The club also announced on 12 May that Harrison Bennett, Aaron Kuhl, Stuart Moore, Joe Tupper, Terence Vancooten, Sean Long, Craig Tanner, Jack Denton, Dominic Hyam and Harry Cardwell would be leaving the club on the expiration of their contract.

On 16 May, Kermorgant scored the only goal in Reading's 1–0 win over Fulham to progress to the Championship Play-off Final. The same evening, the club announced that the EFL had approved the majority share takeover from Chinese investors Dai Yongge and Dai Xiuli.

On 29 May, Reading played in the EFL Championship play-off final against Huddersfield Town, drawing 0–0 in both regular and extra time before losing 4–3 in a penalty shootout. The defeat meant Reading's 2017–18 season would be their fifth successive season of Championship football.

== Transfers ==
=== In ===
Date	Position	Nationality	Name	From	Fee	Ref.
25 May 2016 †	DF	(Netherlands)	Danzell Gravenberch	FC Dordrecht	Undisclosed	
28 June 2016 †	MF	(Netherlands)	Joey van den Berg	SC Heerenveen	Free	
1 July 2016	DF	(England)	Terence Vancooten	Staines Town		
8 July 2016	FW	(France)	Joseph Mendes	Le Havre	Undisclosed	
11 July 2016	GK	(Finland)	Anssi Jaakkola	Ajax Cape Town	Undisclosed	
14 July 2016	MF	(England)	John Swift	Chelsea	Free	
16 July 2016	MF	(Netherlands)	Roy Beerens	Hertha BSC	Undisclosed	
29 July 2016	FW	(Ivory Coast)	Yakou Méïte	Paris Saint-Germain	Undisclosed	
5 August 2016	MF	(England)	Callum Harriott	Charlton Athletic	Undisclosed	
18 August 2016	MF	(Liechtenstein)	Sandro Wieser	Thun	Free	
20 August 2016	DF	(England)	Liam Moore	Leicester City	Undisclosed	
22 August 2016	DF	(England)	Tyler Blackett	Manchester United	Undisclosed	
1 September 2016	MF	(Germany)	Anil Capkın	1. FC Köln II	Free	
18 January 2017	DF	(Portugal)	Tiago Ilori	Liverpool	Undisclosed	
30 January 2017	MF	(Romania)	Adrian Popa	Steaua București	Undisclosed	

† Gravenberch and van den Berg's transfers were announced on the above dates, but were not finalised until 1 July.

=== Out ===
Date	Position	Nationality	Name	To	Fee	Ref.
4 July 2016	FW	(England)	Rowan Liburd	Stevenage	Undisclosed	
10 July 2016	MF	(England)	Aaron Tshibola	Aston Villa	Undisclosed	
3 August 2016	MF	(Northern Ireland)	Oliver Norwood	Brighton & Hove Albion	Undisclosed	
August 2016	MF	(Portugal)	Lisandro Semedo	AEZ Zakakiou	Undisclosed	
17 January 2017	GK	(England)	Billy Collings	Brighton & Hove Albion	Undisclosed	
31 January 2017	MF	(Germany)	Anil Capkın	Bonner SC		
4 February 2017	DF	(Republic of Ireland)	Shane Griffin	Cork City	Undisclosed	
1 March 2017	DF	(Iceland)	Sindri Scheving	Valur	Undisclosed	

=== Loans in ===
Date from	Position	Nationality	Name	From	Date to	Ref.
31 January 2017	MF	(England)	Jordon Mutch	Crystal Palace	End of Season	
31 January 2017	DF	(England)	Reece Oxford	West Ham United	End of Season	
31 January 2017	FW	(England)	Lewis Grabban	Bournemouth	End of Season	

=== Loans out ===
Date from	Position	Nationality	Name	To	Date to	Ref.
28 July 2016	DF	(Republic of Ireland)	Sean Long	Cambridge United	6 months	
3 August 2016	MF	(Peru)	Paolo Hurtado	Vitória de Guimarães	End of season	
3 August 2016	GK	(England)	Lewis Ward	Margate	3 January 2017	
3 August 2016	GK	(England)	George Legg	Hungerford Town	16 March 2017	
18 August 2016	FW	(England)	Craig Tanner	Plymouth Argyle	16 January 2017	
19 August 2016	MF	(England)	Aaron Kuhl	Boreham Wood	28 January 2017	
25 August 2016	DF	(England)	Robert Dickie	Cheltenham Town	2 January 2017	
26 August 2016	GK	(England)	Jonathan Bond	Gillingham	7 January 2017	
26 August 2016	FW	(England)	Sam Smith	Bishop's Stortford	27 November 2016	
31 August 2016	MF	(England)	Jack Stacey	Exeter City	23 January 2017	
31 August 2016	MF	(England)	Tarique Fosu	Colchester United	7 January 2017	
31 August 2016	DF	(Scotland)	Dominic Hyam	Portsmouth	8 January 2017	
6 October 2016	DF	(Iceland)	Sindri Scheving	Cirencester Town	6 November 2016	
2 December 2016	DF	(Scotland)	Zak Jules	Braintree Town	2 January 2017	
23 December 2016	DF	(Iceland)	Axel Andrésson	Bath City	25 February 2017	
5 January 2017	DF	(Republic of Ireland)	Sean Long	Lincoln City	End of season	
12 January 2017	MF	(England)	Tarique Fosu	Colchester United	End of season	
16 January 2017	FW	(England)	Craig Tanner	Plymouth Argyle	End of season	
19 January 2017	DF	(England)	Jake Cooper	Millwall	End of season	
20 January 2017	MF	(Scotland)	Jake Sheppard	Dagenham & Redbridge	End of season	
20 January 2017	MF	(England)	Harrison Bennett	Margate	18 February 2017	
21 January 2017	FW	(Scotland)	Harry Cardwell	Brighton & Hove Albion	End of season	
23 January 2017	MF	(England)	Jack Stacey	Exeter City	End of season	
24 January 2017	DF	(Republic of Ireland)	Niall Keown	Partick Thistle	End of season	
27 January 2017	DF	(Scotland)	Zak Jules	Motherwell	End of season	
31 January 2017	GK	(England)	Stuart Moore	Luton Town	End of season	
31 January 2017	FW	(England)	Dominic Samuel	Ipswich Town	End of season	
17 February 2017	GK	(England)	Lewis Ward	Margate	18 March 2017	
17 February 2017	MF	(England)	Harrison Bennett	Margate	18 March 2017	
25 February 2017	DF	(England)	Terence Vancooten	Basingstoke Town	End of season	
28 February 2017	DF	(Iceland)	Axel Andrésson	Bath City	End of season	
17 March 2017	GK	(England)	Lewis Ward	Hungerford Town	End of season	
23 March 2017	DF	(Scotland)	Dominic Hyam	Aldershot Town	End of season	

=== Released ===
Date	Position	Nationality	Name	Joined	Date	Ref.
30 June 2017	GK	(England)	Stuart Moore	Barrow	1 July 2017	
30 June 2017	GK	(England)	Joe Tupper	Crystal Palace	1 July 2018	
30 June 2017	DF	(England)	Terence Vancooten	Stevenage	18 July 2017	
30 June 2017	DF	(Republic of Ireland)	Sean Long	Lincoln City	1 July 2017	
30 June 2017	DF	(Scotland)	Dominic Hyam	Coventry City	1 July 2017	
30 June 2017	DF	(Scotland)	Zak Jules	Shrewsbury Town	1 July 2017	
30 June 2017	MF	(England)	Harrison Bennett	Swindon Supermarine	30 October 2017	
30 June 2017	MF	(England)	Jack Denton	Windsor	July 2017	
30 June 2017	MF	(England)	Tarique Fosu	Charlton Athletic	1 July 2017	
30 June 2017	MF	(England)	Aaron Kuhl	Basingstoke Town	October 2019	
30 June 2017	MF	(United States)	Danny Williams	Huddersfield Town	4 July 2017	
30 June 2017	FW	(England)	Craig Tanner	Motherwell	5 June 2017	
30 June 2017	FW	(Scotland)	Harry Cardwell	Grimsby Town	17 July 2017	

=== Trial ===
Date From	Date To	Position	Nationality	Name	Last club
11 July 2016	20 July 2016	DF	(Argentina)	Gastón Campi	Racing Club
26 September 2016		MF	(Portugal)	Érico Sousa	NK Celje
23 January 2017		FW	(Netherlands)	Adham El Idrissi	Jong Ajax
24 January 2017		MF	(England)	Rio Dasilva	AFC Oaklands

== Squad ==
As of match played 29 May 2017

No.	Name	Nationality	Position	Date of birth (Age (Note: Age as of the end of the season))	Signed from	Signed in	Contract ends	Apps.	Goals
Goalkeepers
1	Jonathan Bond	(England)	GK	19 May 1993 (aged 24)	Watford	2015	2018	14	0
26	Ali Al-Habsi	(Oman)	GK	30 December 1981 (aged 35)	Wigan Athletic	2015	2019	91	0
31	Anssi Jaakkola	(Finland)	GK	13 March 1987 (aged 30)	Ajax Cape Town	2016	2018	3	0
40	Stuart Moore	(England)	GK	8 September 1994 (aged 22)	Academy	2013	2017	0	0
43	George Legg	(England)	GK	30 April 1996 (aged 21)	Academy	2015		0	0
56	Luke Southwood (Note: Luke Southwood was born in Oxford, England, representing England at U20 level before going on to make his international debut for Northern Ireland in March 2022.)	(England)	GK	6 December 1997 (aged 19)	Academy	2016		0	0
57	Joe Tupper	(England)	GK	15 November 1997 (aged 19)	Academy	2016	2017	0	0
	Lewis Ward	(England)	GK	5 March 1997 (aged 20)	Academy	2015		0	0
Defenders
2	Chris Gunter	(Wales)	RB	21 July 1989 (aged 27)	Nottingham Forest	2012	2018	218	3
3	Jake Cooper	(England)	CB	3 February 1995 (aged 22)	Academy	2013	2018	54	4
5	Paul McShane	(Republic of Ireland)	DF	6 January 1986 (aged 31)	Hull City	2015	2018	71	4
11	Jordan Obita (Note: Obita was born in Oxford, England, but qualified to represent Uganda and made his international debut for Uganda in June 2025.)	(England)	DF	8 December 1993 (aged 23)	Academy	2010	2018	162	4
16	Liam Moore (Note: Liam Moore was born in Loughborough, England, but qualified to represent Jamaica, and made his international debut for Jamaica in March 2021.)	(England)	DF	31 January 1993 (aged 24)	Leicester City	2016	2020	47	1
20	Tiago Ilori (Note: Tiago Ilori was born in Hampstead, England, but qualified to represent Portugal through his mother, representing Portugal at U18, U19, U20, U21 and U23 level.)	(Portugal)	DF	26 February 1993 (aged 24)	Liverpool	2017	2020	8	0
22	Zak Jules (Note: Zak Jules was born in Islington, England, but qualified to represent Scotland through his mother, representing Scotland at U17, U19, U20, and U21 level.)	(Scotland)	DF	2 July 1997 (aged 19)	Academy	2015		0	0
24	Tyler Blackett	(England)	DF	2 April 1994 (aged 23)	Manchester United	2016	2019	40	0
28	Danzell Gravenberch	(Netherlands)	DF	13 February 1994 (aged 23)	Dordrecht	2016	2019	5	0
30	Tennai Watson	(England)	DF	4 March 1997 (aged 20)	Academy	2015	2018	7	0
32	Reece Oxford	(England)	DF	16 December 1998 (aged 18)	Loan from West Ham United	2017	2017	4	0
34	Niall Keown (Note: Keown was born in Oxford, England, but also qualified to represent Republic of Ireland and Northern Ireland through his grandparents. Keown made his debut for Republic of Ireland U21 in 2016.)	(Republic of Ireland)	RB	5 April 1995 (aged 22)	Academy	2013	2018	2	0
47	Axel Andrésson	(Iceland)	DF	27 January 1998 (aged 19)	Academy	2016		0	0
52	Gabriel Osho (Note: Osho was born in Reading, England, but qualified to represent Nigeria and made his international debut for Nigeria in November 2024.)	(England)	DF	14 August 1997 (aged 19)	Academy	2016		0	0
53	Omar Richards	(England)	DF	15 February 1998 (aged 19)	Academy	2016		0	0
58	Terence Vancooten (Note: Terence Vancooten was born in Kingston upon Thames, England, but qualified to represent Guyana, making his debut in October 2017.)	(England)	DF	29 December 1997 (aged 19)	Staines Town	2016	2017	0	0
59	Tom McIntyre (Note: Tom McIntyre was born in Reading, England, but qualified to represent Scotland, representing them at U17, U20 and U21 level.)	(Scotland)	DF	6 November 1998 (aged 18)	Academy	2016		0	0
61	Teddy Howe	(England)	DF	9 October 1998 (aged 18)	Academy	2017		0	0
63	Ramarni Medford-Smith	(England)	DF	21 October 1998 (aged 18)	Academy	2017		0	0
	Robert Dickie	(England)	DF	3 March 1996 (aged 21)	Academy	2014		1	0
	Dominic Hyam	(Scotland)	DF	20 December 1995 (aged 21)	Academy	2014	2017	0	0
	Sean Long	(Republic of Ireland)	RB	2 April 1995 (aged 22)	Academy	2013	2017	1	0
	Sindri Scheving	(Iceland)	DF	19 November 1997 (aged 19)	Academy	2016		0	0
Midfielders
4	Joey van den Berg	(Netherlands)	MF	13 February 1986 (aged 31)	SC Heerenveen	2016	2018	34	1
6	George Evans	(England)	CM	13 December 1994 (aged 22)	Manchester City	2016	2019	49	2
7	Roy Beerens	(Netherlands)	MF	22 December 1987 (aged 29)	Hertha BSC	2016	2019	43	7
8	John Swift	(England)	MF	23 June 1995 (aged 21)	Chelsea	2016	2019	42	9
12	Garath McCleary (Note: McCleary was born in Oxford, England, but qualified to represent Jamaica and made his international debut for Jamaica in February 2013.)	(Jamaica)	RW	15 May 1987 (aged 30)	Nottingham Forest	2012	2020	193	26
15	Callum Harriott (Note: Callum Harriott was born in Norbury, England, but qualified to represent Guyana, making his international debut for Guyana in March 2019.)	(England)	MF	4 March 1994 (aged 23)	Charlton Athletic	2016	2019	16	3
17	Sandro Wieser	(Liechtenstein)	MF	3 February 1993 (aged 24)	Thun	2016	2019	0	0
21	Stephen Quinn	(Republic of Ireland)	MF	1 April 1986 (aged 31)	Hull City	2015	2018	43	2
23	Danny Williams (Note: Williams was born in Karlsruhe, Germany, and represented Germany at U-15 level. Williams also qualified to play for the United States through his parents, and made his debut for them in October 2011.)	(United States)	CM	8 March 1989 (aged 28)	Hoffenheim	2013	2017	156	14
25	Adrian Popa	(Romania)	MF	24 July 1988 (aged 28)	Steaua București	2017	2020	8	1
29	Josh Barrett (Note: Josh Barrett was born in Oxford, England, but qualified to represent the Republic of Ireland through his parents, representing the Republic of Ireland at U16, U17, U19 and U21 level.)	(Republic of Ireland)	MF	21 June 1998 (aged 18)	Academy	2015		3	0
35	Jake Sheppard	(Scotland)	MF	30 May 1997 (aged 19)	Academy	2015	2017	0	0
37	Jack Stacey	(England)	MF	6 April 1996 (aged 21)	Academy	2014	2019	6	0
38	Liam Kelly (Note: Liam Kelly was born in Basingstoke, England, but qualified to represent the Republic of Ireland through his parents, representing the Republic of Ireland at U19 and U21 level.)	(Republic of Ireland)	MF	22 November 1995 (aged 21)	Academy	2014	2019	34	1
39	Tariqe Fosu (Note: Tariqe Fosu was born in Wandsworth, England, but qualified to represent the Ghana, making his debut in October 2020.)	(England)	MF	5 November 1995 (aged 21)	Academy	2014	2017	1	0
42	Andy Rinomhota (Note: Rinomhota was born in Leeds, England, but qualified to represent Zimbabwe and made his international debut for Zimbabwe in November 2023.)	(England)	MF	21 April 1997 (aged 20)	Academy	2016		0	0
48	Harrison Bennett	(England)	MF	23 September 1997 (aged 19)	Academy	2016	2017	0	0
51	Ryan East	(England)	MF	7 August 1998 (aged 18)	Academy	2016		0	0
54	Jordon Mutch	(England)	MF	2 December 1991 (aged 25)	Loan from Crystal Palace	2017	2017	9	1
60	Tyler Frost	(England)	MF	7 August 1999 (aged 17)	Academy	2017		0	0
	Conor Davis	(Republic of Ireland)	MF	3 June 1998 (aged 18)	Academy	2016		0	0
	Paolo Hurtado	(Peru)	MF	27 July 1990 (aged 26)	Paços de Ferreira	2015	2018	6	0
	Jordan Holsgrove	(Scotland)	MF	10 September 1999 (aged 17)	Academy	2017		0	0
	Aaron Kuhl	(England)	MF	30 January 1996 (aged 21)	Academy	2014	2017	8	0
Forwards
9	Joseph Mendes (Note: Mendes was born in Évreux, France, but qualified to represent Guinea-Bissau and made his international debut for Guinea-Bissau in June 2019.)	(France)	FW	30 March 1991 (aged 26)	Le Havre	2016	2018	16	3
10	Deniss Rakels	(Latvia)	FW	20 August 1992 (aged 24)	KS Cracovia	2016	2018	17	3
14	Dominic Samuel	(England)	FW	1 April 1994 (aged 23)	Academy	2012	2018	16	2
18	Yann Kermorgant	(France)	FW	8 November 1981 (aged 35)	Bournemouth	2016	2018	65	22
19	Yakou Méïté (Note: Yakou Méïte was born in Paris, France, but qualified to represent the Ivory Coast, representing the Ivory Coast at U17, U20 and U23 level.)	(Ivory Coast)	FW	11 February 1996 (aged 21)	Paris Saint-Germain	2016	2019	15	1
27	Craig Tanner	(England)	FW	27 October 1994 (aged 22)	Academy	2013	2017	5	1
36	Andrija Novakovich	(United States)	FW	21 September 1996 (aged 20)	University School of Milwaukee	2014		2	0
41	Harry Cardwell (Note: Harry Cardwell was born in Beverley, England, but qualified to represent Scotland, representing the Scotland at U19 and U21 level.)	(Scotland)	FW	23 October 1996 (aged 20)	Academy	2014	2017	0	0
50	Lewis Grabban	(England)	FW	12 January 1988 (aged 29)	Loan from Bournemouth	2017	2017	19	3
55	Sam Smith	(England)	FW	8 March 1998 (aged 19)	Academy	2016		0	0
62	Danny Loader (Note: Loader was born in Reading, England, but qualified to represent Cameroon, and made his international debut for Cameroon in March 2025 having previously represented England various youth level.)	(England)	FW	28 August 2000 (aged 16)	Academy	2016		0	0
Left during the season
33	Shane Griffin	(Republic of Ireland)	DF	8 September 1994 (aged 22)	Academy	2013		0	0
	Billy Collings	(England)	GK	10 October 1997 (aged 19)	Academy	2016		0	0

== Friendlies ==
9 July 2016 Friendly	Boreham Wood	0–5	Reading	Borehamwood
15:00 BST		Report	Evans 44'; Rakels 59'; Fosu 79', 90'; L.Kelly 84'	Stadium: Meadow Park; Referee: C O'Donnell

15 July 2016 Friendly	Al-Taawoun	1–3	Reading	Arnhem, Netherlands
17:00 BST	Al-Zein 81'	Report	Manoel 39' (o.g.); Williams 40'; Kermorgant 90'	Stadium: Sportpark Schuytgraaf

16 July 2016 Friendly	Lincoln City	4–1	Reading	Lincoln
15:00 BST	J.Caton 1'; Muldoon 3'; Waterfall 49'; Wood 86'	[ Report]	Smith 82'	Stadium: Sincil Bank

19 July 2016 Friendly	Swindon Town	1–2	Reading	Swindon
19:45 BST	Goddard 45'	Report	Rakels 79'; Stacey 88'	Stadium: County Ground

23 July 2016 Friendly	AFC Wimbledon	2–0	Reading	Kingston upon Thames
15:00 BST	Parrett 1'; Poleon 20'	Report		Stadium: Kingsmeadow

29 July 2016 Friendly	Reading	1–1	Bournemouth	Reading
20:00 BST	Swift 50'	Report	L.Cook 37'	Stadium: Madejski Stadium; Attendance: 6,600

== Competitions ==
=== Championship ===
==== League table ====
Pos	Team	Pld	W	D	L	GF	GA	GD	Pts	Promotion, qualification or relegation
1	Newcastle United (C, P)	46	29	7	10	85	40	+45	94	Promotion to the Premier League
2	Brighton & Hove Albion (P)	46	28	9	9	74	40	+34	93	Promotion to the Premier League
3	Reading	46	26	7	13	68	64	+4	85	Qualification for the Championship play-offs (Note: Four teams play for one spot and promotion to the Premier League.)
4	Sheffield Wednesday	46	24	9	13	60	45	+15	81	Qualification for the Championship play-offs
5	Huddersfield Town (O, P)	46	25	6	15	56	58	−2	81	Qualification for the Championship play-offs

Source: English Football League, Soccerway
Rules for classification: 1) Points; 2) Goal difference; 3) Number of goals scored; 4) Points in head-to-head matches; 5) Goal difference in head-to-head matches; 6) Goals scored in head-to-head matches; 7) Play-off.
(C) Champions; (O) Play-off winners; (P) Promoted

==== Results summary ====
Overall								Home						Away					
Pld	W	D	L	GF	GA	GD	Pts	W	D	L	GF	GA	GD	W	D	L	GF	GA	GD
46	26	7	13	68	64	+4	85	16	5	2	35	16	+19	10	2	11	33	48	−15

Last updated: 7 May 2017.
Source: #Matches

==== Results by matchday ====
Round	1	2	3	4	5	6	7	8	9	10	11	12	13	14	15	16	17	18	19	20	21	22	23	24	25	26	27	28	29	30	31	32	33	34	35	36	37	38	39	40	41	42	43	44	45	46
Ground	H	A	A	H	A	H	H	A	H	A	H	A	H	A	H	A	H	H	A	H	A	A	H	A	H	A	H	H	A	A	H	H	A	A	H	H	A	A	H	H	A	A	H	A	H	A
Result	W	L	L	D	W	W	D	W	W	L	D	D	L	W	W	W	W	W	L	W	L	W	W	W	L	L	W	W	W	D	D	W	L	L	W	D	L	W	W	W	L	W	W	L	W	W
Position	8	15	20	21	15	11	12	8	4	9	8	8	10	8	5	4	3	3	3	3	3	3	3	3	3	5	3	3	3	3	4	4	4	5	5	5	5	5	4	4	4	4	3	3	3	3

Updated to match(es) played on 7 May 2017. Source: Matches
A = Away; H = Home; W = Win; D = Draw; L = Loss

==== Matches ====
6 August 2016 1	Reading	1–0	Preston North End	Reading
15:00 BST (UTC+1)	Swift 35'; McShane (yellow card) 36'; Evans (yellow card) 50'	BBC Report; Reading Report	Cunningham (yellow card) 50'; Gallagher (yellow card) 59'	Stadium: Madejski Stadium; Attendance: 15,754; Referee: Andy Davies

13 August 2016 2	Wolverhampton Wanderers	2–0	Reading	Wolverhampton
15:00 BST (UTC+1)	Batth (yellow card) 12'; Doherty 42'; Mason 47'; Evans (yellow card) 79'	BBC Report; Reading Report	Obita (yellow card) 88'; Kermorgant (yellow card) 90+3'	Stadium: Molineux; Attendance: 20,425; Referee: Darren Bond

17 August 2016 3	Newcastle United	4–1	Reading	Newcastle upon Tyne
19:45 BST (UTC+1)	Gayle (yellow card) 3' (goal) 69', 89'; Hayden 20'; Ritchie 50' (pen.)	BBC Report; Reading Report	Obita (yellow card) 19'; Williams (yellow card) 40'; McCleary 45' (pen.); Gunter (yellow card) 49'; Kermorgant (yellow card) 62'; Evans (yellow card) 68'	Stadium: St James' Park; Attendance: 48,209; Referee: Andy Madley

20 August 2016 4	Reading	2–2	Brighton & Hove Albion	Reading
15:00 BST (UTC+1)	Swift 2' van den Berg (yellow card) 8' (yellow-red card) 90'; McShane 59'; Williams (yellow card) 90+2'; Kermorgant (yellow card) 90+4'	BBC Report; Reading Report	van den Berg 8' (o.g.); Knockaert 46'; Dunk (yellow card) 57'; Bong (yellow card) 72'	Stadium: Madejski Stadium; Attendance: 16,781; Referee: Mike Jones

27 August 2016 5	Cardiff City	0–1	Reading	Cardiff
15:00 BST (UTC+1)		BBC Report; Reading Report	Kermorgant 89'	Stadium: Cardiff City Stadium; Attendance: 15,013; Referee: Andy Woolmer

9 September 2016 6	Reading	2–1	Ipswich Town	Reading
20:00 BST (UTC+1)	Moore (yellow card) 29'; Gunter (yellow card) 38'; Evans (yellow card) 41'; McCleary 45+2' (pen.); Blackett (yellow card) 49' van den Berg (yellow card) 90+4'; Williams 90+5' (pen.)	BBC Report; Reading Report	Pitman 50' (pen.); Chambers (yellow card) 52'; Berra (yellow card) 90+4'; Knudsen (yellow card) 90+5'; Skuse (yellow card) 90+5'	Stadium: Madejski Stadium; Attendance: 15,146; Referee: Jeremy Simpson

13 September 2016 7	Reading	0–0	Birmingham City	Reading
20:00 BST (UTC+1)		BBC Report; Reading Report		Stadium: Madejski Stadium; Attendance: 14,602; Referee: Chris Kavanagh

17 September 2016 8	Barnsley	1–2	Reading	Barnsley
15:00 BST (UTC+1)	Hammill (yellow card) 33'; Hourihane (yellow card) 35'; Armstrong (yellow card) 63' (goal) 81'	BBC Report; Reading Report	McCleary 9' (red card) 34'; Swift 27' (yellow card) 50'; Kermorgant (yellow card) 42'; Williams (yellow card) 45+1'; Blackett (yellow card) 60'	Stadium: Oakwell; Attendance: 12,675; Referee: David Coote

24 September 2016 9	Reading	1–0	Huddersfield Town	Reading
15:00 BST (UTC+1)	Obita (yellow card) 35'; Beerens 41'; Gunter (yellow card) 56'	BBC Report; Reading Report	van La Parra (yellow card) 23' (yellow-red card) 26'; Smith (yellow card) 27'; Löwe (yellow card) 45'; Hudson (yellow card) 59'; Kachunga (yellow card) 66'	Stadium: Madejski Stadium; Attendance: 17,030; Referee: James Linington

27 September 2016 10	Brentford	4–1	Reading	Brentford
19:45 BST (UTC+1)	Dean (yellow card) 5'; McCormack (yellow card) 19'; Clarke 41'; Vibe 44'; Colin 58'; Bjelland (yellow card) 69'; Yennaris (yellow card) 81'; Hogan 86'	BBC Report; Reading Report	van den Berg (yellow card) 16'; Swift (yellow card) 19'; Kermorgant 64' (pen.)	Stadium: Griffin Park; Attendance: 9,679; Referee: Oliver Langford

1 October 2016 11	Reading	1–1	Derby County	Reading
15:00 BST (UTC+1)	McCleary (yellow card) 60'; Gunter (yellow card) 61'; Evans 90'	BBC Report; Reading Report	Johnson (yellow card) 44'; Vydra 62'; Hughes (yellow card) 65'; Ince (yellow card) 90'; Butterfield (yellow card) 90+4'	Stadium: Madejski Stadium; Attendance: 17,002; Referee: Tim Robinson

15 October 2016 12	Queens Park Rangers	1–1	Reading	Shepherd's Bush
15:00 BST (UTC+1)	Wszołek 14'; Lynch (yellow card) 49'	BBC Report; Reading Report	Williams 21' van den Berg (yellow card) 46'	Stadium: Loftus Road; Attendance: 15,048; Referee: Steve Martin

18 October 2016 13	Reading	1–2	Aston Villa	Reading
20:00 BST (UTC+1)	Williams (penalty missed) 54'; Kermorgant 54'; McCleary (yellow card) 90+3'	BBC Report; Reading Report	Kodjia 38'; Hutton (yellow card) 78'; Ayew 90' (pen.)	Stadium: Madejski Stadium; Attendance: 20,331; Referee: Andy Woolmer

22 October 2016 14	Rotherham United	0–1	Reading	Rotherham
15:00 BST (UTC+1)	Blackstock (yellow card) 52'; Halford (yellow card) 69'	BBC Report; Reading Report	Gunter (yellow card) 52'; McShane 86'; Swift (yellow card) 89'	Stadium: New York Stadium; Attendance: 8,800; Referee: Scott Duncan

29 October 2016 15	Reading	2–0	Nottingham Forest	Reading
15:00 BST (UTC+1)	McCleary 10'; Moore (yellow card) 26' van den Berg (yellow card) 52'; Gunter 62'; Williams (yellow card) 83'	BBC Report; Reading Report	Traoré (yellow card) 36'; Lansbury (yellow card) 51'	Stadium: Madejski Stadium; Attendance: 17,093; Referee: Andy Davies

5 November 2016 16	Wigan Athletic	0–3	Reading	Wigan
15:00 GMT (UTC)	MacDonald (yellow card) 45+1'; Power (yellow card) 62'; Perkins (yellow card) 69'	BBC Report; Reading Report	McCleary 1', 5'; McShane (yellow card) 33'; Kermorgant 63' (pen.)	Stadium: DW Stadium; Attendance: 10,277; Referee: David Coote

19 November 2016 17	Reading	3–0	Burton Albion	Reading
15:00 GMT (UTC)	Samuel 22' (yellow card) 63'; Williams 29'; McCleary (yellow card) 64'; Brayford 77' (o.g.); McShane (yellow card) 90+4'	BBC Report; Reading Report	Turner (yellow card) 44'	Stadium: Madejski Stadium; Attendance: 15,545; Referee: Keith Stroud

26 November 2016 18	Reading	2–1	Bristol City	Reading
15:00 GMT (UTC)	McCleary 13'; Beerens 19' (yellow card) 61'; Moore (yellow card) 48'	BBC Report; Reading Report	Bryan (yellow card) 83'; O'Neil 87'; Wilbraham (yellow card) 90+4'	Stadium: Madejski Stadium; Attendance: 18,778; Referee: Tim Robinson

3 December 2016 19	Fulham	5–0	Reading	Fulham
15:00 GMT (UTC)	Gunter 15' (o.g.); Aluko (yellow card) 40' (goal) 68'; Martin 49', 90'; Johansen 71'	BBC Report; Reading Report	McShane (yellow card) 2'; Obita (yellow card) 50'; Williams (red card) 54' van den Berg (yellow card) 57'; Evans (yellow card) 88'	Stadium: Craven Cottage; Attendance: 18,217; Referee: Oliver Langford

10 December 2016 20	Reading	2–1	Sheffield Wednesday	Reading
15:00 GMT (UTC)	Evans (yellow card) 44' van den Berg (yellow card) 48'; Beerens 57', 76'; McShane (yellow card) 80'	BBC Report; Reading Report	Nuhiu (yellow card) 29'; Lee (yellow card) 72'; Hutchinson (yellow card) 73'; Wallace (yellow card) 79'; Loovens (yellow card) 80'; Fletcher 90+2'	Stadium: Madejski Stadium; Attendance: 18,153; Referee: Tony Harrington

13 December 2016 21	Leeds United	2–0	Reading	Leeds
19:45 GMT (UTC)	Wood 19'; Ayling (yellow card) 49'; Doukara 90+1' (pen.)	BBC Report; Reading Report	Méïte (yellow card) 86'	Stadium: Elland Road; Attendance: 21,242; Referee: Geoff Eltringham

17 December 2016 22	Blackburn Rovers	2–3	Reading	Blackburn
15:00 GMT (UTC)	Graham 44'; Lowe (yellow card) 66'; Brown 73'	BBC Report; Reading Report	Samuel 32'; McCleary (yellow card) 36'; Moore 60'; Evans 90+2'	Stadium: Ewood Park; Attendance: 10,982; Referee: Jeremy Simpson

26 December 2016 23	Reading	3–1	Norwich City	Reading
15:00 GMT (UTC)	van den Berg (yellow card) 29'; Kermorgant 37'; McCleary 68'; Harriott 90+1'; Swift (yellow card) 90+4'	BBC Report; Reading Report	Tettey (yellow card) 34'; Pinto (yellow card) 37'; Oliveira 60'; Howson (red card) 67'	Stadium: Madejski Stadium; Attendance: 21,180; Referee: Andrew Davies

30 December 2016 24	Reading	Abandoned	Fulham	Reading
20:00 GMT (UTC)	Williams (yellow card) 36'	BBC Report	Fredericks (yellow card) 9'	Stadium: Madejski Stadium; Referee: James Linington

2 January 2017 25	Bristol City	2–3	Reading	Bristol
15:00 GMT (UTC)	Abraham 27', 47' (pen.) (yellow card) 62'; Little (yellow card) 64'	BBC Report; Reading Report	Kermorgant (yellow card) 39' (goal) 86', 90+3' van den Berg (yellow card) 68'; Kelly 72'; Moore (yellow card) 77'	Stadium: Ashton Gate Stadium; Attendance: 20,074; Referee: Roger East

12 January 2017 26	Reading	0–1	Queens Park Rangers	Reading
20:00 GMT (UTC)	Moore (yellow card) 85' van den Berg (yellow card) 89'	BBC Report; Reading Report	Mackie 28' (yellow card) 33'; Wszołek (yellow card) 87'	Stadium: Madejski Stadium; Attendance: 12,655; Referee: Oliver Langford

21 January 2017 27	Derby County	3–2	Reading	Derby
15:00 GMT (UTC)	Bent 36'; Ince 63' (yellow card) 90+8'; Hughes 74'; Bryson (yellow card) 79'; Russell (yellow card) 85'	BBC Report; Reading Report	Swift 16' (yellow card) 41'; Méïte 80'; Obita (yellow card) 87' (yellow-red card) 90+6'	Stadium: iPro Stadium; Attendance: 28,393; Referee: Peter Bankes

24 January 2017 24	Reading	1–0	Fulham	Reading
20:00 GMT (UTC)	McShane (yellow card) 32'; Beerens 49'; McCleary (yellow card) 68'	BBC Report; Reading Report	Martin (yellow card) 72'	Stadium: Madejski Stadium; Attendance: 16,012; Referee: Steve Martin

28 January 2017 28	Reading	2–1	Cardiff City	Reading
15:00 GMT (UTC)	Swift 42'; Moore (yellow card) 45'; Kermorgant 60'	BBC Report; Reading Report	Bamba (yellow card) 8'; Ralls 45+1' (pen.)	Stadium: Madejski Stadium; Attendance: 18,558; Referee: James Adcock

31 January 2017 29	Birmingham City	0–1	Reading	Birmingham
19:45 GMT (UTC)	Gleeson (yellow card) 56'	BBC Report; Reading Report	McCleary (yellow card) 56'; Swift 77'; Méïte (yellow card) 90+2'	Stadium: St Andrew's; Attendance: 16,672; Referee: Jeremy Simpson

4 February 2017 30	Ipswich Town	2–2	Reading	Ipswich
15:00 GMT (UTC)	Lawrence 43', 61'; Knudsen (yellow card) 90+4'	BBC Report; Reading Report	Mutch 52'; Obita 78'; Grabban (yellow card) 85'; Evans (yellow card) 89'	Stadium: Portman Road; Attendance: 15,091; Referee: Geoff Eltringham

11 February 2017 31	Reading	0–0	Barnsley	Reading
15:00 GMT (UTC)	Obita (yellow card) 34'; Gunter (yellow card) 69'	BBC Report; Reading Report	Jones (yellow card) 61'; Armstrong (yellow card) 90+5'	Stadium: Madejski Stadium; Attendance: 16,222; Referee: Darren Bond

14 February 2017 32	Reading	3–2	Brentford	Reading
20:00 GMT (UTC)	Swift 22'; Williams 77' (yellow card) 82'; Beerens 81'; Mutch (yellow card) 90+4'	BBC Report; Reading Report	Canós (yellow card) 55'; Jota (yellow card) 57' (goal) 63'; Vibe 66'; Woods (yellow card) 72'	Stadium: Madejski Stadium; Attendance: 15,710; Referee: Keith Stroud

21 February 2017 33	Huddersfield Town	1–0	Reading	Huddersfield
19:45 GMT (UTC)	Billing 82'; Hefele (yellow card) 90'	BBC Report; Reading Report	Kermorgant (yellow card) 90+2'	Stadium: The John Smith's Stadium; Attendance: 19,894; Referee: Tony Harrington

25 February 2017 34	Brighton & Hove Albion	3–0	Reading	Falmer
17:30 GMT (UTC)	Stephens (yellow card) 27'; Baldock 35'; Sidwell (yellow card) 55'; Murphy 56'; Knockaert 80'	BBC Report; Reading Report	Evans (yellow card) 68'	Stadium: Falmer Stadium; Attendance: 29,613; Referee: Peter Bankes

4 March 2017 35	Reading	2–1	Wolverhampton Wanderers	Reading
15:00 GMT (UTC)	Kermorgant 48' (yellow card) 90+1'; McShane 78'; Williams (yellow card) 90+1'	BBC Report; Reading Report	Williamson (yellow card) 38' (yellow-red card) 85'; Marshall 50'; Dicko (yellow card) 66'	Stadium: Madejski Stadium; Attendance: 18,629; Referee: Andy Madley

7 March 2017 36	Reading	0–0	Newcastle United	Reading
20:00 GMT (UTC)	Gunter (yellow card) 90+2'	BBC Report; Reading Report		Stadium: Madejski Stadium; Attendance: 23,121; Referee: Andy Davies

11 March 2017 37	Preston North End	3–0	Reading	Preston
15:00 GMT (UTC)	Boyle (yellow card) 29'; Barkhuizen 31', 49'; Horgan 40'	BBC Report; Reading Report	Gunter (yellow card) 90+1'	Stadium: Deepdale; Attendance: 10,787; Referee: Scott Duncan

17 March 2017 38	Sheffield Wednesday	0–2	Reading	Sheffield
19:45 GMT (UTC)		BBC Report; Reading Report	Kermorgant 13'; Blackett (yellow card) 25'; Obita (yellow card) 64'; Popa 90+6'	Stadium: Hillsborough Stadium; Attendance: 26,072; Referee: Geoff Eltringham

1 April 2017 39	Reading	1–0	Leeds United	Reading
17:30 BST (UTC+1)	Kermorgant 21' (yellow card) 90'; Swift (yellow card) 52'; Williams (yellow card) 84'	BBC Report; Reading Report		Stadium: Madejski Stadium; Attendance: 23,055; Referee: Keith Stroud

4 April 2017 40	Reading	3–1	Blackburn Rovers	Reading
20:00 BST (UTC+1)	Kermorgant 14', 29'; Blackett (yellow card) 47'; McCleary 78'	BBC Report; Reading Report	Bennett 77'	Stadium: Madejski Stadium; Attendance: 15,353; Referee: James Adcock

8 April 2017 41	Norwich City	7–1	Reading	Norwich
15:00 BST (UTC+1)	Oliveira 3' (pen.); Hoolahan 15', 41'; Pritchard 26', 35'; Martin 31'; Murphy (yellow card) 88'; Jerome 89'	BBC Report; Reading Report	Kermorgant 39'; Moore (yellow card) 59'; Obita (yellow card) 88'	Stadium: Carrow Road; Attendance: 26,163; Referee: James Linington

15 April 2017 42	Aston Villa	1–3	Reading	Birmingham
15:00 BST (UTC+1)	Chester 14'; Bacuna (yellow card) 78'	BBC Report; Reading Report	Mendes 6', 16'; Williams (yellow card) 16'; Obita (yellow card) 66'; Grabban 79' (pen.); Swift (yellow card) 86'	Stadium: Villa Park; Attendance: 30,742; Referee: Scott Duncan

17 April 2017 43	Reading	2–1	Rotherham United	Reading
15:00 BST (UTC+1)	Grabban 66'; Swift 79'	BBC Report; Reading Report	Vaulks (yellow card) 17'; Adeyemi 19'; Mattock (yellow card) 85'	Stadium: Madejski Stadium; Attendance: 16,711; Referee: Chris Kavanagh

22 April 2017 44	Nottingham Forest	3–2	Reading	West Bridgford
15:00 BST (UTC+1)	Vaughan (yellow card) 12'; Assombalonga 31', 47'; Carayol 54'; Ward (yellow card) 90+2'	BBC Report; Reading Report	Blackett (yellow card) 25'; Kermorgant 58', 74'; Gunter (yellow card) 83'	Stadium: City Ground; Attendance: 20,323; Referee: Geoff Eltringham

29 April 2017 45	Reading	1–0	Wigan Athletic	Reading
15:00 BST (UTC+1)	Kermorgant 6'; Evans (yellow card) 13'; Moore (yellow card) 45+3'; Gunter (yellow card) 51'; Williams (yellow card) 64'; Kelly (yellow card) 87'	BBC Report; Reading Report	Connolly (yellow card) 50'	Stadium: Madejski Stadium; Attendance: 19,177; Referee: Tim Robinson

7 May 2017 46	Burton Albion	2–4	Reading	Burton upon Trent
12:00 BST (UTC+1)	Turner 69'; Woodrow 72'; Irvine (yellow card) 77'	BBC Report; Reading Report	Mendes 3'; Obita 21'; Kermorgant 64'; Grabban 84'	Stadium: Pirelli Stadium; Attendance: 6,264; Referee: Simon Hooper

==== Play-offs ====
13 May 2017 Semi-final 1st leg	Fulham	1–1	Reading	Fulham
17:30 BST	Malone (yellow card) 54'; McDonald (yellow card) 56'; Cairney 65'	BBC Report; Reading Report	Swift (yellow card) 40'; Kermorgant (yellow card) 42'; Obita 53'; McShane (red card) 80'	Stadium: Craven Cottage; Attendance: 23,717; Referee: Stuart Attwell

16 May 2017 Semi-final 2nd leg	Reading	1–0 (2–1 agg.)	Fulham	Reading
19:45 BST	Kermorgant 49' (pen.) (yellow card) 51'; Moore (yellow card) 52'	BBC Report; Reading Report	McDonald (yellow card) 38'; Johansen (yellow card) 58'; Malone (yellow card) 65'	Stadium: Madejski Stadium; Attendance: 22,044; Referee: Martin Atkinson

29 May 2017 Final	Huddersfield Town	0–0 (a.e.t.) (4–3 p)	Reading	Wembley
15:00 BST	Hogg (yellow card) 29'; Kachunga (yellow card) 61'; Smith (yellow card) 75'	BBC Report	van den Berg (yellow card) 17'; Kermorgant (yellow card) 19'; Obita (yellow card) 105'	Stadium: Wembley Stadium; Attendance: 76,682; Referee: Neil Swarbrick
	Penalties
	Löwe (penalty scored); Hefele (penalty missed); Wells (penalty scored); Mooy (penalty scored); Schindler (penalty scored)		Kermorgant (penalty scored); Williams (penalty scored); Kelly (penalty scored); Moore (penalty missed); Obita (penalty missed)

=== EFL Cup ===
8 August 2016 First round	Reading	2–0	Plymouth Argyle	Reading
20:00 BST (UTC+1)	van den Berg 16'; Beerens 28'	BBC Report; Reading Report		Stadium: Madejski Stadium; Attendance: 6,979; Referee: Simon Hooper

23 August 2016 Second round	Reading	2–2 (a.e.t.) (4–2 p)	Milton Keynes Dons	Reading
20:00 BST (UTC+1)	Jaakkola (yellow card) 34'; Harriott 68', 114'; Moore (yellow card) 81'; Quinn (yellow card) 81'; Williams (yellow card) 118'	BBC Report; Reading Report	Bowditch 34' (pen.) (yellow card) 60'; Upson (yellow card) 103'; Tshimanga 118'	Stadium: Madejski Stadium; Attendance: 6,848; Referee: Charles Breakspear
	Penalties
	Williams (penalty scored); Evans (penalty scored); Quinn (penalty scored); Harriott (penalty missed); Obita (penalty scored)		(penalty scored) Upson; (penalty missed) Reeves; (penalty missed) Carruthers; (penalty scored) Williams

20 September 2016 Third round	Brighton & Hove Albion	1–2	Reading	Falmer
19:45 BST (UTC+1)	Sidwell (yellow card) 79'; Hemed 85'; Norwood (yellow card) 87'; Skalák (yellow card) 90+4'	BBC Report; Reading Report	Quinn 32'; Blackett (red card) 41'; Swift 54' (yellow card) 61'	Stadium: The Amex; Attendance: 6,235; Referee: Lee Probert

25 October 2016 Fourth round	Arsenal	2–0	Reading	London
19:45 BST (UTC+1)	Oxlade-Chamberlain 33', 78'	BBC Report; Reading Report	McCleary (yellow card) 76'; Moore (yellow card) 79'	Stadium: Emirates Stadium; Attendance: 59,865; Referee: Graham Scott

=== FA Cup ===
7 January 2017 Third round	Manchester United	4–0	Reading	Manchester
12:30 GMT (UTC)	Rooney 7'; Martial 15'; Young (yellow card) 54'; Rashford 75', 79'	BBC Report; Reading Report		Stadium: Old Trafford; Attendance: 74,396; Referee: Andre Marriner

=== Professional U23 Development League ===
==== Table ====
Pos	Team	Pld	W	D	L	GF	GA	GD	Pts	Relegation
1	Everton U23s (C)	22	15	3	4	48	21	+27	48	
2	Manchester City EDS	22	13	6	3	54	33	+21	45	
3	Liverpool U23s	22	13	4	5	47	27	+20	43	
4	Arsenal U23s	22	10	3	9	40	32	+8	33	
5	Chelsea U23s	22	7	9	6	40	32	+8	30	
6	Manchester United U23s	22	6	8	8	29	38	−9	26	
7	Sunderland U23s	22	6	7	9	27	37	−10	25	
8	Derby County U23s	22	6	6	10	31	42	−11	24	
9	Leicester City U23s	22	5	8	9	31	42	−11	23	
10	Tottenham Hotspur U23s	22	6	4	12	33	44	−11	22	
11	Reading U23s (R)	22	6	4	12	36	56	−20	22	Relegation to Division 2
12	Southampton U23s (R)	22	5	6	11	28	40	−12	21	Relegation to Division 2

Updated to match(es) played on 15 May 2017. Source:
(C) Champions; (R) Relegated

==== Results ====
12 August 2016 1	Arsenal U23	0–2	Reading U23	Borehamwood
19:00 BST	Kamara (yellow card) 73'	Report	Rinomhota 70'; Cardwell 80'	Stadium: Meadow Park; Attendance: 411; Referee: Samuel Allison

22 August 2016 2	Reading U23	1–4	Tottenham Hotspur U23	Finchampstead
14:00 BST	Rinomhota 73'; J.Sheppard (yellow card) 83'	Report	Edwards 32', 47'; Miller 48'; Harrison 51' (yellow card) 81'; Amos (yellow card) 83'	Stadium: Hogwood Park; Attendance: 89; Referee: Adam Bromley

26 August 2016 3	Reading U23	3–2	Manchester City EDS	Reading
19:00 BST	Wieser 14'; Fosu 33'; T.Mcintyre 43'; J.Sheppard (yellow card) 69'; Barrett (yellow card) 72'; Cardwell (yellow card) 90+6'	Report	Fernandes 63'; Buckley-Ricketts 90+3'; C.Oliver (yellow card) 90+6'	Stadium: Madejski Stadium; Attendance: 753; Referee: Christopher O'Donnell

12 September 2016 4	Southampton U23	3–1	Reading U23	Marchwood
19:00 BST	A.Jones 10'; Bakary (yellow card) 32'; Sims (yellow card) 40' (goal) 64', 89'; Hesketh (yellow card) 90+1'	Report	Novakovich 84'	Stadium: Staplewood Campus; Attendance: 180; Referee: Samuel Allison

19 September 2016 5	Reading U23	2–1	Chelsea U23	Reading
19:05 BST	T.Frost 52'; S.Griffin (yellow card) 77'; Smith 86'; Rinomhota (yellow card) 90+4'	Report	Ugbo 43'; D.Sterling (yellow card) 89'	Stadium: Madejski Stadium; Attendance: 754; Referee: David Rock

26 September 2016 6	Derby County U23	2–1	Reading U23	Burton upon Trent
19:00 BST	Vernam 6'; Guy 56'; K.Gordon (yellow card) 90+2'	Report	Barrett (yellow card) 56'; T.Mcintyre 84'	Stadium: St George's Park National Football Centre; Attendance: 162; Referee: Karl Evans

17 October 2016 7	Reading U23	3–6	Everton U23	High Wycombe
19:00 BST	Novakovich 10', 15'; T.Mcintyre (yellow card) 20' (goal) 89'	Report	Niasse 20', 38', 41'; Dowell (yellow card) 31' (goal) 51'; Davies (yellow card) 43'; Calvert-Lewin 55'; Connolly (yellow card) 73'; Walsh 78'	Stadium: Adams Park; Attendance: 132; Referee: Chris O'Donnell

23 October 2016 8	Sunderland U23	1–1	Reading U23	Hetton-le-Hole
12:00 BST	Honeyman 38'; Greenwood (yellow card) 46'; G.Brady (yellow card) 53'; T.Robson (yellow card) 84'; E.Embleton (yellow card) 88'	Report	Richards 12' (yellow card) 57'	Stadium: Eppleton Colliery Welfare Ground; Attendance: 158; Referee: Martin Coy

28 October 2016 9	Leicester City U23	3–2	Reading U23	Leicester
13:00 GMT (UTC)	R.Uche 65'; A.Pascanu 75' (yellow card) 82'; Benalouane (yellow card) 68'; Barnes 87'; D.Johnson (yellow card) 90+3'	Report	T.Frost 47'; Keown (yellow card) 51'; H.Bennett (yellow card) 62'; R.East 73'	Stadium: Holmes Park; Attendance: 86; Referee: Wayne Barratt

20 November 2016 10	Liverpool U23	2–0	Reading U23	Birkenhead
13:00 GMT (UTC)	Sakho 14'; Woodburn 84'	Report		Stadium: Prenton Park; Attendance: 251; Referee: Scott Oldham

28 November 2016 11	Reading U23	2–2	Manchester United U23	High Wycombe
19:00 GMT (UTC)	Hyam 25'; Mendes (yellow card) 31' (goal) 52'; J.Sheppard (yellow card) 78'	Report	Harrop 29' (pen.), 29'; El Fitouri (yellow card) 48'; Goss (yellow card) 72'	Stadium: Adams Park; Attendance: 256; Referee: Allan Young

10 December 2016 12	Manchester City EDS	2–1	Reading U23	Manchester
13:00 GMT (UTC)	Fernandes 52'; Díaz 71'	Report	Barrett 7'	Stadium: Academy Stadium; Attendance: 188; Referee: Peter Wright

6 January 2017 13	Reading U23	4–2	Southampton U23	Finchampstead
13:00 GMT (UTC)	A.Jones 10' (o.g.); Mendes 15'; Dickie 60'; J.Sheppard (yellow card) 69'; T.Frost (yellow card) 71'; Novakovich 74' (pen.); Barrett (yellow card) 78'	Report	Seager 72' (pen.); O.Cook 80'	Stadium: Hogwood Park; Attendance: 62; Referee: Rob Whitton

16 January 2017 14	Everton U23	3–0	Reading U23	Liverpool
19:00 GMT (UTC)	N.Broadhead 10'; Dowell 52'; H.Charsley 55'	Report	Cooper (yellow card) 60'	Stadium: Goodison Park; Attendance: 155; Referee: Martin Coy

30 January 2017 15	Reading U23	3–3	Derby County U23	High Wycombe
19:00 GMT (UTC)	Novakovich 14', 52'; Rinomhota (yellow card) 28'; T.Frost 75'; Smith (yellow card) 90'	Report	C.MacDonald (yellow card) 30' (goal) 63'; A.Babos 74'; Bennett 90+6'	Stadium: Adams Park; Attendance: 109; Referee: Craig Hicks

5 February 2017 16	Chelsea U23	2–0	Reading U23	Aldershot
12:05 GMT (UTC)	Andrésson 18' (o.g.); Ugbo 49'	Report		Stadium: Recreation Ground; Attendance: 327; Referee: Sam Purkiss

19 February 2017 17	Manchester United U23	0–2	Reading U23	Leigh
12:00 GMT (UTC)	Harrop (yellow card) 71'; McTominay (yellow card) 85'	Report	G.Osho 32'; Smith 58'	Stadium: Leigh Sports Village; Attendance: 1,035; Referee: Thomas Bramall

6 March 2017 18	Reading U23	1–5	Liverpool U23	High Wycombe
19:00 GMT (UTC)	Mendes 36' (pen.); Dickie (yellow card) 38'; T.Holmes (yellow card) 57'; Rinomhota (yellow card) 85'	Report	Gomez 6' (yellow card) 65'; Ojo (yellow card) 18'; R.Brewster 34', 42'; Woodburn (yellow card) 64' (goal) 66'; N.Phillips 87'	Stadium: Adams Park; Attendance: 237; Referee: Adrian Quelch

13 March 2017 19	Tottenham Hotspur U23	4–0	Reading U23	Stevenage
19:00 GMT (UTC)	Loft 11'; Onomah 31' (yellow card) 46'; J.Brown 33'; S.Tracey 54'; Maghoma (yellow card) 83'	Report		Stadium: Broadhall Way; Attendance: 337; Referee: Constantine Hatzidakis

10 April 2017 20	Reading U23	2–5	Arsenal U23	Finchampstead
13:00 BST	Novakovich 2'; J.Holsgrove 24'; Andrésson (yellow card) 74'	Report	Bramall (yellow card) 29' (goal) 71'; Holding (yellow card) 35'; Debuchy 45'; Reine-Adélaïde (yellow card) 51'; Sanogo 53', 68', 73'; Jenkinson (yellow card) 79'	Stadium: Hogwood Park; Attendance: 106; Referee: Chris O'Donnell

24 April 2017 21	Reading U23	2–2	Leicester City U23	Reading
19:00 BST	Rakels 6'; Méïte 13'; Gravenberch (yellow card) 41'	Report	Moore 30' (yellow card) 45+2'; Choudhury 35' (pen.); J.Gordon (yellow card) 41'; C.Wood (yellow card) 57'; A.Pascanu (yellow card) 90+3'	Stadium: Madejski Stadium; Attendance: 207; Referee: Dean Treleaven

8 May 2017 22	Reading U23	3–2	Sunderland U23	Reading
19:00 BST	G.Brady 51' (o.g.); Barrett 56' (pen.); Rinomhota (yellow card) 57'; Richards (yellow card) 60'; Novakovich 64'	Report	Maja 85'; E.Embleton 90+2'	Stadium: Madejski Stadium; Attendance: 278; Referee: Adrian Quelch

=== Premier League Cup ===
==== Group stage ====
Team	Pld	W	D	L	GF	GA	GD	Pts
Reading	6	4	1	1	16	9	+7	13
Sheffield United	6	2	2	2	12	13	−1	8
Birmingham City	6	2	1	3	7	12	−5	7
Stoke City	6	1	2	3	8	9	−1	5

1 October 2016 1	Birmingham City	1–3	Reading U23	Solihull
11:00 BST	O'Keeffe	Report	Rinomhota; T.McIntyre; T.Frost	Stadium: Damson Park

2 December 2016 2	Reading U23	1–0	Stoke City	Reading
GMT (UTC)	Smith	Report		Stadium: Madejski Stadium

17 December 2016 3	Sheffield United	3–3	Reading U23	Sheffield
GMT (UTC)	H.Gilmour; Hallam (pen.); J.Wright	Report	Smith; J.Balogun; Barrett	Stadium: Brammall Lane

23 January 2017 4	Reading U23	4–1	Birmingham City	High Wycombe
GMT (UTC)	Novakovich; T.Frost; Smith	Report	Brown 35'	Stadium: Adams Park

23 January 2017 5	Reading U23	1–3	Sheffield United	High Wycombe
GMT (UTC)	T.Frost	Report	J.Wright (pen.); S.Mallon	Stadium: Adams Park

2 March 2017 6	Stoke City	1–4	Reading U23	Stoke-on-Trent
GMT (UTC)	J.Devlin 90'	Report	Novakovich 29', 40'; Barrett 59', 81'	Stadium: Clayton Wood Training Ground

==== Knockout stage ====
20 March 2017 Round of 16	Reading U23	4–1	Middlesbrough U23	High Wycombe
13:00 GMT (UTC)	Mendes; G.Osho; Méïte	Report	Fewster	Stadium: Adams Park

3 April 2017 Quarterfinal	Newcastle United U23	0–1	Reading U23	Newcastle upon Tyne
BST		Report	Novakovich (pen.)	Stadium: Whitley Park

30 April 2017 Semifinal	Reading U23	4–1	Norwich City U23	Reading
13:00 BST	Dickie 29'; Smith 37', 88'; T.Frost 43'	Report	Grant 48'	Stadium: Madejski Stadium

==== Final ====
15 May 2017	Swansea City U23	2–0	Reading U23	Swansea
BST	King	Report		Stadium: Liberty Stadium

=== Premier League International Cup ===
==== Group stage ====
Team	Pld	W	D	L	GF	GA	GD	Pts
(Germany) Hertha BSC	3	2	1	0	7	3	+4	7
(Spain) Athletic Bilbao	3	2	1	0	7	5	+2	7
(England) Everton	3	1	0	2	4	6	−2	3
(England) Reading	3	0	0	3	3	7	−4	0

18 August 2016 1	Everton (England)	2–1	Reading U23	Southport
19:00 BST (UTC+1)	Dyson 7'; Evans 12'	Report	Fosu 36'	Stadium: Haig Avenue

23 November 2016	Reading U23	2–3	(Spain) Athletic Bilbao	High Wycombe
19:00 GMT (UTC)	Méïte 4', 9'	Report	Southwood 45+3' (o.g.); Bilbao 71'; Villalibre 72'	Stadium: Adams Park

14 December 2016	Reading U23	0–2	(Germany) Hertha BSC	Reading
19:00 GMT (UTC)		Report	Friede 64'; Beyer 74'	Stadium: Madejski Stadium

=== EFL Trophy ===
==== Group stage ====
Pos	Div	Team	Pld	W	PW	PL	L	GF	GA	GD	Pts	Qualification
1	L2	Yeovil Town	3	2	0	1	0	6	3	+3	7	Advance to Round 2
2	ACA	Reading U21	3	1	1	0	1	5	6	−1	5	Advance to Round 2
3	L2	Portsmouth	3	1	0	1	1	6	6	0	4	
4	L1	Bristol Rovers	3	0	1	0	2	2	4	−2	2	

Source: Sky Sports

30 August 2016 1	Bristol Rovers	2–3	Reading U21	Bristol
19:45 BST (UTC+1)	Taylor 60' (yellow card) 73'; Brown (yellow card) 73'; Easter (yellow card) 74' (goal) 81'; Roos (yellow card) 78'; McChrystal (yellow card) 83'	Summary; Reading Report	Stacey 33'; Samuel (yellow card) 59'; Watson (yellow card) 72'; J.Sheppard 77'; Mendes 84' (pen.)	Stadium: Memorial Stadium; Attendance: 1,418; Referee: B.Huxtable

4 October 2016 2	Portsmouth	2–2 (3–4 p)	Reading U21	Portsmouth
19:45 BST (UTC+1)	Main 57', 63'	Summary	Novakovich 7'; Mendes 52' (pen.); Rinomhota (yellow card) 78'	Stadium: Fratton Park; Attendance: 1,355; Referee: Oli Langford
	Penalties
	Smith (penalty scored); Naismith (penalty scored); Bennett (penalty missed); Lalkovič (penalty missed); Evans (penalty scored); May (penalty missed); Whatmough (penalty missed)		(penalty scored) Mendes; (penalty scored) Blackett; (penalty scored) Kelly; (penalty missed) Samuel; (penalty missed) S.Griffin; (penalty missed) Watson; (penalty scored) T.Frost

9 November 2016 3	Reading U21	0–2	Yeovil Town	Reading
19:30 GMT (UTC)		Summary	Mugabi (yellow card) 43'; Eaves 48'; Zoko 89'	Stadium: Madejski Stadium; Attendance: 739; Referee: John Busby

==== Knockout stage ====
21 December 2016 Round 2	Southampton U23	1–1 (3–4 p)	Reading U21	Southampton
19:00 GMT (UTC)	Isgrove 30'; J.Vokins (yellow card) 83'	Summary	Cooper (yellow card) 26'; Keown 50'	Stadium: St Mary's Stadium; Attendance: 1,679; Referee: Lee Collins
	Penalties
	A.Jones (penalty missed); T.O'Connor (penalty missed); C.Slattery (penalty scored); A.Little (penalty scored); Isgrove (penalty scored)		Cooper (penalty scored); Wieser (penalty scored); Watson (penalty scored); T.Frost (penalty missed); Méïte (penalty scored)

10 January 2017 Round 3	Yeovil Town	4–2	Reading U21	Yeovil
19:00 GMT (UTC)	Khan 24'; Zoko 32'; Lawless (yellow card) 45+1'; Sowunmi 65' (yellow card) 76'; Dolan (yellow card) 67'; Shephard (yellow card) 83'; J.Sheppard 88' (o.g.); Maddison (yellow card) 90+2'	Summary	Wieser (red card) 18'; Novakovich 45'; Rinomhota (yellow card) 83'; Barrett 90+2' (pen.) (yellow card) 90+4'	Stadium: Huish Park; Attendance: 1,081; Referee: John Brooks

== Squad statistics ==
As of match played 29 May 2017

=== Appearances and goals ===
No.	Pos	Nat	Player	Total		Championship		FA Cup		League Cup		Playoffs	
No.	Pos	Nat	Player	Apps	Goals	Apps	Goals	Apps	Goals	Apps	Goals	Apps	Goals
2	DF	(Wales) WAL	Chris Gunter	52	1	46	1	1	0	1+1	0	3	0
3	DF	(England) ENG	Jake Cooper	5	0	0+3	0	0	0	2	0	0	0
4	MF	(Netherlands) NED	Joey van den Berg	34	1	26+2	0	1	0	2	1	2+1	0
5	DF	(Republic of Ireland) IRL	Paul McShane	31	3	29+1	3	0	0	0	0	1	0
6	MF	(England) ENG	George Evans	43	2	24+11	2	1	0	2+2	0	3	0
7	MF	(Netherlands) NED	Roy Beerens	43	7	37+3	6	1	0	1+1	1	0	0
8	MF	(England) ENG	John Swift	42	9	31+5	8	0+1	0	2	1	3	0
9	FW	(France) FRA	Joseph Mendes	16	3	2+10	3	0	0	2	0	0+2	0
10	FW	(Latvia) LAT	Deniss Rakels	3	0	1+1	0	0	0	1	0	0	0
11	DF	(England) ENG	Jordan Obita	43	3	28+9	2	0+1	0	3	0	1+1	1
12	MF	(Jamaica) JAM	Garath McCleary	45	9	39+2	9	1	0	1	0	0+2	0
14	FW	(England) ENG	Dominic Samuel	12	2	6+3	2	0+1	0	2	0	0	0
15	MF	(England) ENG	Callum Harriott	16	3	3+9	1	0	0	4	2	0	0
16	DF	(England) ENG	Liam Moore	47	1	40	1	1	0	3	0	3	0
18	FW	(France) FRA	Yann Kermorgant	48	19	34+8	18	1	0	1+1	0	3	1
19	FW	(Ivory Coast) CIV	Yakou Méïte	15	1	1+13	1	0	0	0+1	0	0	0
20	DF	(Portugal) POR	Tiago Ilori	8	0	2+3	0	0	0	0	0	2+1	0
21	MF	(Republic of Ireland) IRL	Stephen Quinn	10	1	1+6	0	0	0	2+1	1	0	0
23	MF	(United States) USA	Danny Williams	47	4	36+5	4	1	0	1+1	0	3	0
24	DF	(England) ENG	Tyler Blackett	40	0	33+1	0	1	0	2	0	3	0
25	MF	(Romania) ROU	Adrian Popa	8	1	4+4	1	0	0	0	0	0	0
26	GK	(Oman) OMA	Ali Al-Habsi	51	0	46	0	1	0	1	0	3	0
28	DF	(Netherlands) NED	Danzell Gravenberch	5	0	0+2	0	0	0	1+2	0	0	0
30	DF	(England) ENG	Tennai Watson	7	0	0+3	0	0	0	4	0	0	0
31	GK	(Finland) FIN	Anssi Jaakkola	3	0	0	0	0	0	3	0	0	0
32	DF	(England) ENG	Reece Oxford	5	0	2+3	0	0	0	0	0	0	0
38	MF	(Republic of Ireland) IRL	Liam Kelly	34	1	21+7	1	1	0	3	0	0+2	0
50	FW	(England) ENG	Lewis Grabban	19	3	7+9	3	0	0	0	0	3	0
54	MF	(England) ENG	Jordon Mutch	9	1	8+1	1	0	0	0	0	0	0
Players away from the club on loan:
Players who left Reading during the season:

=== Goal scorers ===
As of match played 16 May 2017

Place	Position	Nation	Number	Name	Championship	FA Cup	League Cup	Play-offs	Total
1	FW	(France)	18	Yann Kermorgant	18	0	0	1	19
2	MF	(Jamaica)	12	Garath McCleary	9	0	0	0	9
2	MF	(England)	8	John Swift	8	0	1	0	9
4	MF	(Netherlands)	7	Roy Beerens	6	0	1	0	7
5	MF	(United States)	23	Danny Williams	4	0	0	0	4
6	DF	(Republic of Ireland)	5	Paul McShane	3	0	0	0	3
6	MF	(England)	15	Callum Harriott	1	0	2	0	3
6	FW	(France)	9	Joseph Mendes	3	0	0	0	3
6	FW	(England)	50	Lewis Grabban	3	0	0	0	3
6	DF	(England)	11	Jordan Obita	2	0	0	1	3
11	FW	(England)	14	Dominic Samuel	2	0	0	0	2
11	MF	(England)	6	George Evans	2	0	0	0	2
13	DF	(Wales)	2	Chris Gunter	1	0	0	0	1
13	DF	(England)	16	Liam Moore	1	0	0	0	1
13	MF	(Republic of Ireland)	38	Liam Kelly	1	0	0	0	1
13	FW	(Ivory Coast)	19	Yakou Méïte	1	0	0	0	1
13	MF	(England)	54	Jordon Mutch	1	0	0	0	1
13	MF	(Romania)	25	Adrian Popa	1	0	0	0	1
13	MF	(Netherlands)	4	Joey van den Berg	0	0	1	0	1
13	MF	(Republic of Ireland)	21	Stephen Quinn	0	0	1	0	1
13				Own goal	1	0	0	0	1
Total					68	0	6	2	76

=== Clean sheets ===
Place	Position	Nation	Number	Name	Championship	Playoffs	FA Cup	League Cup	Total
1	GK	(Oman)	26	Ali Al-Habsi	15	2	0	0	17
2	GK	(Finland)	31	Anssi Jaakkola	0	0	0	1	1
TOTALS					15	2	0	1	18

=== Disciplinary record ===
As of match played 16 May 2017

Number	Nation	Position	Name	Championship		FA Cup		League Cup		Play-offs		Total	
Number	Nation	Position	Name	Yellow card	Red card	Yellow card	Red card	Yellow card	Red card	Yellow card	Red card	Yellow card	Red card
2	(Wales)	DF	Chris Gunter	10	0	0	0	0	0	0	0	10	0
4	(Netherlands)	MF	Joey van den Berg	11	1	0	0	0	0	1	0	12	1
5	(Republic of Ireland)	DF	Paul McShane	6	0	0	0	0	0	0	1	6	1
6	(England)	MF	George Evans	8	0	0	0	0	0	0	0	8	0
7	(Netherlands)	MF	Roy Beerens	1	0	0	0	0	0	0	0	1	0
8	(England)	MF	John Swift	7	0	0	0	1	0	1	0	9	0
11	(England)	DF	Jordan Obita	10	1	0	0	0	0	1	0	11	1
12	(Jamaica)	MF	Garath McCleary	6	1	0	0	1	0	0	0	7	1
14	(England)	FW	Dominic Samuel	1	0	0	0	0	0	0	0	1	0
16	(England)	DF	Liam Moore	8	0	0	0	2	0	1	0	11	0
18	(France)	FW	Yann Kermorgant	8	0	0	0	0	0	3	0	11	0
19	(Ivory Coast)	FW	Yakou Méïte	2	0	0	0	0	0	0	0	2	0
21	(Republic of Ireland)	MF	Stephen Quinn	0	0	0	0	1	0	0	0	1	0
23	(United States)	MF	Danny Williams	9	1	0	0	1	0	0	0	10	1
24	(England)	DF	Tyler Blackett	5	0	0	0	0	1	0	0	5	1
31	(Finland)	GK	Anssi Jaakkola	0	0	0	0	1	0	0	0	1	0
38	(Republic of Ireland)	MF	Liam Kelly	1	0	0	0	0	0	0	0	1	0
50	(England)	FW	Lewis Grabban	1	0	0	0	0	0	0	0	1	0
54	(England)	MF	Jordon Mutch	1	0	0	0	0	0	0	0	1	0
Total				95	4	0	0	7	1	7	1	109	6

== U21/23 statistics ==
As of match played 15 May 2017

=== Appearances and goals ===
No.	Pos	Nat	Player	Total		Premier League 2		Premier League Cup		EFL Trophy		Premier League International Cup	
No.	Pos	Nat	Player	Apps	Goals	Apps	Goals	Apps	Goals	Apps	Goals	Apps	Goals
1	GK	(England) ENG	Jonathan Bond	5	0	4	0	0	0	0	0	1	0
3	DF	(England) ENG	Jake Cooper	7	0	4	0	0	0	2	0	1	0
9	FW	(France) FRA	Joseph Mendes	8	7	4	3	1	2	2	2	0+1	0
10	FW	(Latvia) LAT	Deniss Rakels	7	1	5	1	2	0	0	0	0	0
14	FW	(England) ENG	Dominic Samuel	7	0	3	0	1	0	3	0	0	0
15	MF	(England) ENG	Callum Harriott	1	0	1	0	0	0	0	0	0	0
17	MF	(Liechtenstein) LIE	Sandro Wieser	7	1	4	1	0	0	2	0	1	0
19	FW	(Ivory Coast) CIV	Yakou Méïte	9	4	4	1	3	1	1	0	1	2
20	DF	(Portugal) POR	Tiago Ilori	1	0	1	0	0	0	0	0	0	0
21	MF	(Republic of Ireland) IRL	Stephen Quinn	2	0	2	0	0	0	0	0	0	0
22	DF	(Scotland) SCO	Zak Jules	15	0	11	0	2	0	0	0	2	0
24	DF	(England) ENG	Tyler Blackett	1	0	0	0	0	0	1	0	0	0
27	FW	(England) ENG	Craig Tanner	1	0	1	0	0	0	0	0	0	0
28	DF	(Netherlands) NED	Danzell Gravenberch	9	0	4	0	0	0	3	0	2	0
29	MF	(Republic of Ireland) IRL	Josh Barrett	35	6	20+2	2	6	3	3+1	1	3	0
30	DF	(England) ENG	Tennai Watson	12	0	4	0	3	0	4	0	1	0
31	GK	(Finland) FIN	Anssi Jaakkola	4	0	0	0	1	0	3	0	0	0
32	DF	(England) ENG	Reece Oxford	1	0	1	0	0	0	0	0	0	0
34	DF	(Republic of Ireland) IRL	Niall Keown	6	1	2	0	1	0	1+1	1	1	0
35	MF	(Scotland) SCO	Jake Sheppard	18	1	10+1	0	3+1	0	1+1	1	1	0
36	FW	(United States) USA	Andrija Novakovich	33	15	16+3	8	8	5	3	2	3	0
37	MF	(England) ENG	Jack Stacey	5	1	3	0	0	0	1	1	1	0
38	MF	(Republic of Ireland) IRL	Liam Kelly	5	0	2	0	0	0	2	0	1	0
39	MF	(England) ENG	Tariqe Fosu	4	2	2	1	0	0	1	0	1	1
40	GK	(England) ENG	Stuart Moore	7	0	4	0	1	0	2	0	0	0
41	FW	(Scotland) SCO	Harry Cardwell	10	1	0+6	1	0+1	0	1+1	0	0+1	0
42	MF	(England) ENG	Andy Rinomhota	39	3	22	2	10	1	5	0	2	0
43	GK	(England) ENG	George Legg	5	0	3	0	2	0	0	0	0	0
45	DF	(Scotland) SCO	Dominic Hyam	11	1	6+2	1	0	0	1	0	2	0
47	DF	(Iceland) ISL	Axel Andrésson	12	0	4+3	0	2+2	0	0	0	1	0
48	MF	(England) ENG	Harrison Bennett	11	0	6+1	0	3	0	0	0	1	0
51	MF	(England) ENG	Ryan East	18	1	7+3	1	7	0	0	0	1	0
52	DF	(England) ENG	Gabriel Osho	14	2	6+1	1	6	1	1	0	0	0
53	DF	(England) ENG	Omar Richards	24	1	12	1	8	0	1+1	0	2	0
55	FW	(England) ENG	Sam Smith	22	7	5+5	2	6+2	5	1+2	0	1	0
56	GK	(England) ENG	Luke Southwood	17	0	11	0	4	0	0	0	2	0
58	DF	(England) ENG	Terence Vancooten	6	0	1+2	0	2	0	0	0	0+1	0
59	DF	(Scotland) SCO	Tom McIntyre	9	4	5	3	1	1	3	0	0	0
60	MF	(England) ENG	Tyler Frost	33	7	12+6	3	9	4	3+2	0	1	0
61	DF	(England) ENG	Teddy Howe	3	0	1+1	0	1	0	0	0	0	0
62	FW	(England) ENG	Danny Loader	11	0	1+5	0	1+2	0	1+1	0	0	0
63	DF	(England) ENG	Ramarni Medford-Smith	9	0	3+1	0	1+2	0	2	0	0	0
	GK	(Australia) AUS	Liam Driscoll	2	0	0+1	0	1	0	0	0	0	0
	GK	(England) ENG	Lewis Ward	1	0	0	0	1	0	0	0	0	0
	DF	(England) ENG	Robert Dickie	16	2	10	1	6	1	0	0	0	0
	DF	(England) ENG	Tom Holmes	7	0	2+2	0	2+1	0	0	0	0	0
	DF	(England) ENG	Jamal Balogun	1	1	0	0	0+1	1	0	0	0	0
	DF	(England) ENG	Akin Odimayo	4	0	0+1	0	0+3	0	0	0	0	0
	MF	(England) ENG	Aaron Kuhl	3	0	1	0	0	0	0	0	2	0
	MF	(Portugal) POR	Érico Sousa	1	0	1	0	0	0	0	0	0	0
	MF	(Scotland) SCO	Jordan Holsgrove	10	1	4+1	1	4+1	0	0	0	0	0
	FW	(Scotland) SCO	Ben House	1	0	0	0	1	0	0	0	0	0
Players away from the club on loan:
Players who left Reading during the season:
33	DF	(Republic of Ireland) IRL	Shane Griffin	8	0	4	0	1	0	1+2	0	0	0

=== Goal scorers ===
As of match played 10 January 2017

Place	Position	Nation	Number	Name	Premier League 2	Premier League Cup	EFL Trophy	Premier League International Cup	Total
1	FW	(United States)	36	Andrija Novakovich	8	5	2	0	15
2	MF	(England)	60	Tyler Frost	3	4	0	0	7
2	FW	(France)	9	Joseph Mendes	3	2	2	0	7
2	FW	(England)	55	Sam Smith	2	5	0	0	7
5	MF	(Republic of Ireland)	29	Josh Barrett	2	3	1	0	6
6	DF	(Scotland)	59	Thomas McIntyre	3	1	0	0	4
6	FW	(Ivory Coast)	19	Yakou Méïte	1	1	0	2	4
8	MF	(England)	42	Andy Rinomhota	2	1	0	0	3
9	DF	(England)	52	Gabriel Osho	1	1	0	0	2
9	DF	(England)		Robert Dickie	1	1	0	0	2
9				Own goal	2	0	0	0	2
12	FW	(Latvia)	10	Deniss Rakels	1	0	0	0	1
12	MF	(Liechtenstein)	17	Sandro Wieser	1	0	0	0	1
12	MF	(England)	39	Tariqe Fosu	1	0	0	0	1
12	FW	(Scotland)	41	Harry Cardwell	1	0	0	0	1
12	DF	(Scotland)	45	Dominic Hyam	1	0	0	0	1
12	MF	(England)	51	Ryan East	1	0	0	0	1
12	DF	(England)	53	Omar Richards	1	0	0	0	1
12	MF	(Scotland)		Jordan Holsgrove	1	0	0	0	1
12	DF	(England)		Jamal Balogun	0	1	0	0	1
12	MF	(Scotland)	35	Jake Sheppard	0	0	1	0	1
12	DF	(Republic of Ireland)	34	Niall Keown	0	0	1	0	1
Total					36	25	7	3	71

=== Disciplinary record ===
As of match played 10 January 2017

Number	Nation	Position	Name	Premier League 2		Premier League Cup		EFL Trophy		Total	
Number	Nation	Position	Name	Yellow card	Red card	Yellow card	Red card	Yellow card	Red card	Yellow card	Red card
3	(England)	DF	Jake Cooper	1	0	0	0	1	0	2	0
9	(France)	FW	Joseph Mendes	1	0	0	0	0	0	1	0
14	(England)	FW	Dominic Samuel	0	0	0	0	1	0	1	0
17	(Liechtenstein)	MF	Sandro Wieser	0	0	0	0	0	1	0	1
28	(Netherlands)	DF	Danzell Gravenberch	1	0	0	0	0	0	1	0
29	(Republic of Ireland)	MF	Josh Barrett	3	0	0	0	1	0	4	0
30	(England)	DF	Tennai Watson	0	0	0	0	1	0	1	0
33	(Republic of Ireland)	DF	Shane Griffin	1	0	0	0	0	0	1	0
34	(Republic of Ireland)	DF	Niall Keown	1	0	0	0	0	0	1	0
35	(Scotland)	MF	Jake Sheppard	4	0	0	0	0	0	4	0
41	(Scotland)	FW	Harry Cardwell	1	0	0	0	0	0	1	0
42	(England)	MF	Andy Rinomhota	4	0	0	0	2	0	6	0
47	(Iceland)	DF	Axel Andrésson	1	0	0	0	0	0	1	0
48	(England)	MF	Harrison Bennett	1	0	0	0	0	0	1	0
53	(England)	DF	Omar Richards	2	0	0	0	0	0	2	0
55	(England)	FW	Sam Smith	1	0	0	0	0	0	1	0
59	(Scotland)	DF	Tom McIntyre	1	0	0	0	0	0	1	0
60	(England)	MF	Tyler Frost	1	0	0	0	0	0	1	0
	(England)	DF	Tom Holmes	1	0	0	0	0	0	1	0
	(England)	DF	Robert Dickie	1	0	0	0	0	0	1	0
Total				26	0	0	0	6	1	32	1

== Awards ==
=== Manager of the Month ===
Month	Name	Award
September	Jaap Stam	Nominated
November	Jaap Stam	Nominated
January	Jaap Stam	Won

=== Player of the Month ===
Month	Name	Award
November	Ali Al-Habsi	Nominated
April	Yann Kermorgant	Won

=== Young Player of the Month ===
Month	Name	Award
January	John Swift	Won

=== Young Player of the Year ===
Name	Award
John Swift	Nominated
