= Jerrel =

Jerrel is a masculine given name. Notable people with this name include:

- Jerrel Britto (born 1992), Trinidadian footballer
- Jerrel Feller (born 1987), Dutch athlete who specialises in the 100 meter relay
- Jerrel Floyd Hasselbaink (born 1972), Dutch football manager and former player
- Jerrel Jernigan (born 1989), American professional football player
- Jerrel Venetiaan (born 1971), retired Dutch kickboxer and mixed martial artist
- Jerrel Wilson (1941–2005), nicknamed "Thunderfoot", American football player
- Jerrel Wolfgang (born 1984), Dutch footballer
- Jerrel Yakel, American neuroscientist

== See also ==
- Jerel, given name
- Jerrell, given name
