= Jarrell =

Jarrell may refer to:

== Places ==
- Jarrell Plantation, historic site
- Jarrell, Texas, city in Williamson County

== People with the given name Jarrell ==
- Jarrell Brantley (born 1996), American professional basketball player
- Jarrell Huang (born 2000), Singaporean singer-songwriter
- Jarrell Miller (born 1988), American boxer and kickboxer

== People with the surname Jarrell ==
- Albert E. Jarrell (1901–1977), commissioned officer in the United States Navy
- Charles Michael Jarrell (born 1940), American prelate of the Roman Catholic Church
- Jae Jarrell (born 1935), American artist
- Mary von Schrader Jarrell (1914–2007), patron of the arts and memoirist
- Michael Jarrell (born 1958), Swiss composer
- Randall Jarrell (1914–1965) American poet, literary critic
- Tommy Jarrell (1901–1985), American fiddler, banjo player, and singer
- Wadsworth Jarrell (born 1929), African-American painter

== See also ==
- Jarell, given name
- Jarrell tornado, an F5 tornado that affected the city of Jarrell, Texas
