= Jervell =

Jervell is a surname. Notable people with the surname include:

- Anton Jervell (1901–1987), Norwegian physician, politician, and organizational leader
- Jacob Jervell (1925–2014), Norwegian theologian, professor emeritus, author, and priest

== See also ==
- Jerrell
