= Jerell =

Jerell is a given name. Notable people with the name include:

- Jerell Adams (born 1992), American football player
- Jerell Sellars (born 1995), English footballer
- Jerell Springer (born 1999), American basketball player

== See also ==
- Jarell, given name
- Jerel, given name
- Jerrell, given name
