= George Evans (footballer, born 1994) =

English footballer

Personal information
- Full name: George Evans
- Date of birth: 13 December 1994 (age 31)
- Place of birth: Cheadle, England
- Height: 1.84 m (6 ft 1/2 in)
- Positions: Defensive midfielder; centre-back; right-back

Team information
- Current team: Burton Albion
- Number: 12

Youth career
- 2003–2013: Manchester City

Senior career*
Years	Team	Apps	(Gls)
2013–2016	Manchester City	0	(0)
2013–2014	→ Crewe Alexandra (loan)	23	(1)
2015	→ Scunthorpe United (loan)	16	(1)
2015–2016	→ Walsall (loan)	12	(3)
2016–2018	Reading	59	(3)
2018–2021	Derby County	34	(0)
2021–2023	Millwall	55	(2)
2023–2025	Wrexham	34	(0)
2025–	Burton Albion	35	(2)

International career
2011	England U17	4	(0)
2012	England U19	1	(0)
- * Club domestic league appearances and goals as of 1 October 2025 (UTC)

George Evans (born 13 December 1994) is an English professional footballer who plays as a defensive midfielder, centre-back or right-back for EFL League One club Burton Albion.

== Career ==
=== Manchester City ===
Evans was born in Cheadle, Greater Manchester and joined Manchester City at the age of six. After several seasons in Manchester City's academy, Evans first came to prominence with several appearances on the bench for City during the 2012–13 season, although he was ultimately not given a debut for the senior team. In the following season, Evans began playing for the Elite Development Squad before being loaned to Crewe Alexandra at the end of October. Within a week he was given his first senior cap, being named in the starting line-up for Crewe's home league game against Bradford City, against whom he played a full 90 minutes. Evans' first goal for Crewe Alexandra came on 23 November against local rivals Port Vale.

On 30 January 2015, he joined Scunthorpe United on loan until the end of the season. Evans made 16 appearances during his loan spell, scoring once. On 22 September 2015, Evans made his First Team debut for Manchester City when he came on as a substitute during a 4–1 win against Sunderland in the League Cup. In doing so, he became the second Manchester City player to represent the club at all levels from under-8s right through to the senior team, after Chris Chantler.

On 20 October 2015, Evans joined League One club Walsall on a one-month loan deal. He made his Walsall debut on the same day against Barnsley and scored the opening goal in a 0–2 away win. On 24 November 2015, after "playing week in, week out", he extended his loan at Walsall until 9 January 2016 and was then extended again until 26 January 2016, the maximum allowed time for an emergency loan deal. On 16 January 2016 he was recalled by parent club Manchester City as an offer had been made for a permanent move away from the club.

=== Reading ===
On 19 January 2016, Evans joined Championship club Reading on a three-and-a-half-year deal until 2019. Evans scored his first goal for the club in a 1–1 draw with Derby County on 1 October 2016.

=== Derby County ===
On 31 July 2018, Evans joined Championship club Derby County for an undisclosed fee, believed to be around £1m, on a 3-year deal He signed a contract extension in August 2020 to take him through until the summer of 2022.

=== Millwall ===
On 1 February 2021, Evans joined Championship club Millwall for an undisclosed fee. He scored his first goal for Millwall, a late equaliser, in a 1-1 draw against Luton Town on 23 February 2021.

=== Wrexham ===
In September 2023 Evans joined EFL League Two club Wrexham on a two-year contract. On July 1, 2024, following Wrexham's promotion to EFL League One, Evans signed a two-year extension to stay with the club. On 1 September 2025 he left the club by mutual consent.

=== Burton Albion ===
Also on 1 September 2025, Evans signed for EFL League One side Burton Albion on a one year deal with an additional option year.

On 8 May 2026, the club announced a new one-year deal for the player.

== Career statistics ==
As of match played 26 August 2025

Appearances and goals by club, season and competition
Club	Season	League			FA Cup		League Cup		Other		Total	
Club	Season	Division	Apps	Goals	Apps	Goals	Apps	Goals	Apps	Goals	Apps	Goals
Manchester City	2013–14	Premier League	0	0	0	0	0	0	—		0	0
Manchester City	2014–15	Premier League	0	0	0	0	0	0	0	0	0	0
Manchester City	2015–16	Premier League	0	0	0	0	1	0	—		1	0
Manchester City	Total		0	0	0	0	1	0	0	0	1	0
Crewe Alexandra (loan)	2013–14	League One	23	1	2	0	0	0	0	0	25	1
Scunthorpe United (loan)	2014–15	League One	16	1	0	0	0	0	0	0	16	1
Walsall (loan)	2015–16	League One	12	3	4	1	0	0	0	0	16	4
Reading	2015–16	Championship	6	0	0	0	0	0	—		6	0
Reading	2016–17	Championship	35	2	1	0	4	0	3 (Note: Appearances in Championship Play-Offs)	0	43	2
Reading	2017–18	Championship	18	1	2	0	3	1	—		22	2
Reading	Total		59	3	3	1	7	1	3	0	72	4
Derby County	2018–19	Championship	11	0	2	0	1	0	—		14	0
Derby County	2019–20	Championship	17	0	1	0	2	0	—		20	0
Derby County	2020–21	Championship	6	0	0	0	2	0	—		8	0
Derby County	Total		34	0	3	0	5	0	—		42	0
Millwall	2020–21	Championship	19	1	0	0	0	0	—		19	1
Millwall	2021–22	Championship	23	1	0	0	2	0	—		25	1
Millwall	2022–23	Championship	11	0	1	0	1	0	—		13	0
Millwall	2023–24	Championship	2	0	0	0	1	0	—		3	0
Millwall	Total		55	2	1	0	4	0	—		60	2
Wrexham	2023–24	League Two	27	0	4	0	0	0	1 (Note: Appearances in EFL Trophy)	0	32	0
Wrexham	2024–25	League One	7	0	0	0	1	0	3 (Note: Appearances in EFL Trophy)	0	11	0
Wrexham	2025–26	Championship	0	0	0	0	2	0	—		2	0
Wrexham	Total		34	0	4	0	3	0	4	0	45	0
Career total			233	10	17	1	20	1	7	0	277	12

== Honours ==
Wrexham

- EFL League One runner-up: 2024–25
- EFL League Two runner-up: 2023–24
