= Joseph Mendes =

Footballer (born 1991)

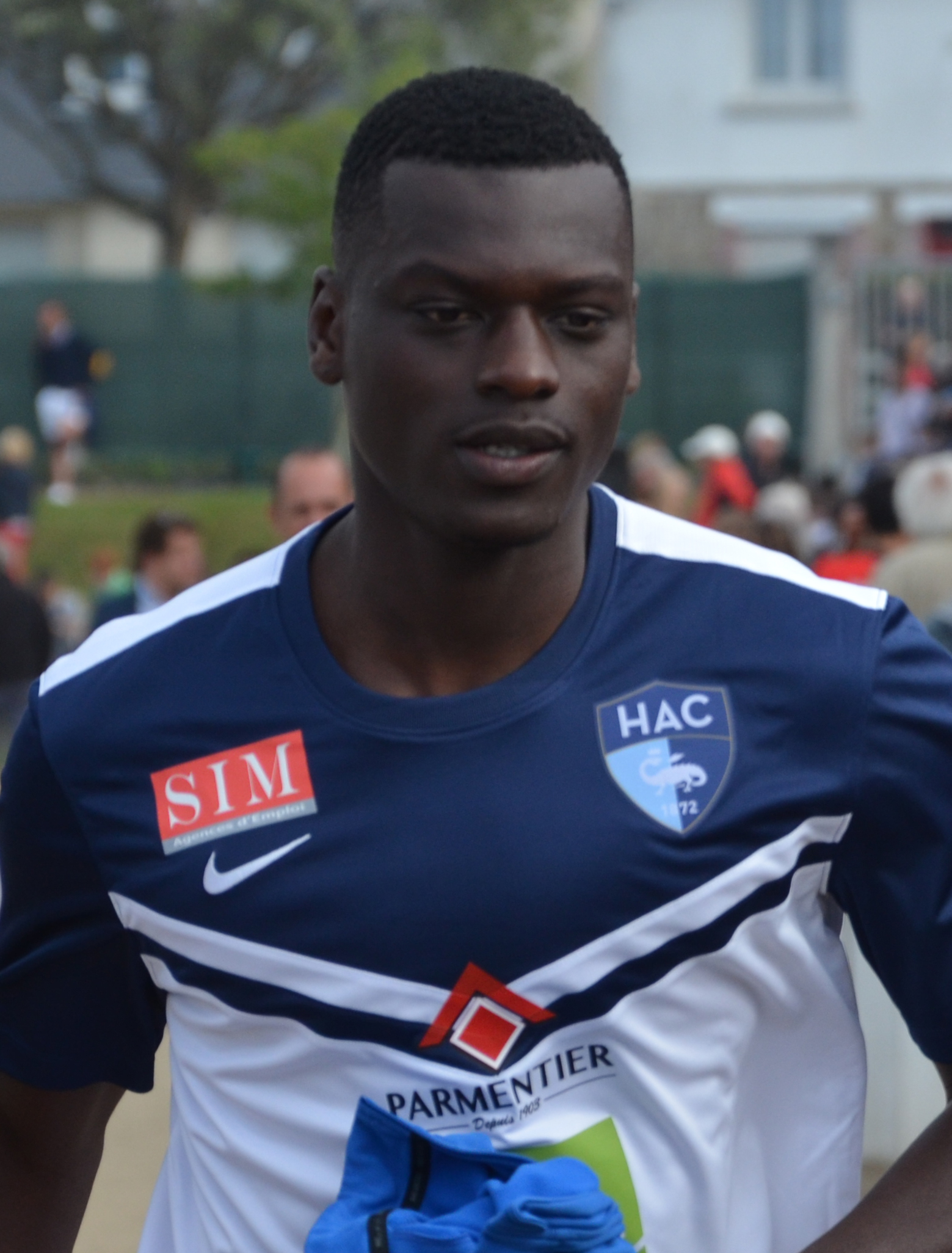
- Mendes with Le Havre in 2015

Personal information
- Full name: Joseph Mendes
- Date of birth: 30 March 1991 (age 35)
- Place of birth: Évreux, France
- Height: 1.86 m (6 ft 1 in)
- Position: Forward

Senior career*
Years	Team	Apps	(Gls)
2010–2011	Grenoble	13	(1)
2011–2012	Épinal	22	(3)
2012–2013	Le Mans	20	(3)
2012–2013	Le Mans B	9	(4)
2014	Lokomotiv Plovdiv	7	(0)
2014	Luzenac	0	(0)
2014–2016	Le Havre	59	(11)
2015	Le Havre B	4	(1)
2016–2018	Reading	15	(3)
2018–2020	Ajaccio	32	(0)
2019–2020	Ajaccio B	5	(2)
2020–2022	Niort	54	(6)
2022–2023	Rodez	24	(2)
2023–2025	Dijon	7	(1)
2024	Dijon B	1	(0)

International career^{‡}
2019–	Guinea-Bissau	10	(4)
- * Club domestic league appearances and goals as of 16 May 2025 ‡ National team caps and goals as of 22:10, 1 September 2021 (UTC)

Joseph Mendes (born 30 March 1991) is a professional footballer who plays as a forward. Born in France, he represents the Guinea-Bissau national team.

== Club career ==
Born in Évreux, Mendes began his career at Grenoble in Ligue 2. He made 14 total appearances in his only season, and scored his only goal on 17 December 2010, when he came on as an 84th-minute substitute for Yoric Ravet and wrapped up a 3–1 home win over Dijon. In October 2011, he signed for Championnat National team Épinal.

In 2012, Mendes returned to the second tier with Le Mans. He remained there until December 2013, when he signed an 18-month deal with Lokomotiv Plovdiv in the Bulgarian A Football Group. In June 2014, he returned to Ligue 2 with newly promoted club Luzenac AP, who eventually were suspended from competition due to an inadequate stadium and released all of their professionals. In August, he signed a three-year deal with Le Havre in the same competition. He scored a career-best 9 goals in 2015–16, including two in a 3–1 win at Auxerre on 6 May 2016.

On 8 July 2016, Mendes signed a two-year contract with Championship side Reading. Mendes scored a brace, on his first start in a 3–1 away victory over Aston Villa on 15 April 2017. He played only seven times in his second season, and in May 2018 Reading decided against renewing his contract.

On 2 July 2018, Mendes signed for Ligue 2 club AC Ajaccio. He joined up again with Ghislain Gimbert, his former Le Havre strike partner. Goalless across his entire first season, he scored his first goal for the Corsicans on 13 August 2019 in a 4–1 home win over Valenciennes in the first round of the Coupe de la Ligue.

In 2020, Mendes signed for Ligue 2 side Niort.

On 1 July 2022, Mendes joined Rodez on a two-year deal.

On 28 August 2023, Mendes moved to Dijon on a one-year contract with an optional second year.

== International career ==
Born in France to a Bissau-Guinean father and a Senegalese mother, Mendes was first selected to the Guinea-Bissau national football team for the 2019 Africa Cup of Nations qualification match against Namibia in November 2018. He made his debut on 8 June 2019 in a friendly against Angola, as a starter, and later that month was chosen for the 2019 Africa Cup of Nations, in which his team were eliminated from the group stage in Egypt.

In September 2019, Mendes scored all of Guinea-Bissau's goals in a 3–1 aggregate win over São Tomé and Príncipe in the first round of qualification for the 2022 FIFA World Cup.

== Career statistics ==
As of match played 1 February 2022

Appearances and goals by club, season and competition
Club	Season	League			National cup		League cup		Other		Total	
Club	Season	Division	Apps	Goals	Apps	Goals	Apps	Goals	Apps	Goals	Apps	Goals
Grenoble	2010–11	Ligue 2	15	1	2	0	0	0	–		17	1
SAS Épinal	2011–12	Championnat National	22	3	0	0	–		–		22	3
Le Mans	2012–13	Ligue 2	20	3	2	2	0	0	–		22	5
Lokomotiv Plovdiv	2013–14	Parva Liga	7	0	1	0	–		–		8	0
Le Havre	2014–15	Ligue 2	22	2	1	0	0	0	–		23	2
Le Havre	2015–16	Ligue 2	37	9	0	0	1	0	–		38	9
Le Havre	Total		59	11	1	0	1	0	0	0	61	11
Reading	2016–17	Championship	12	3	0	0	2	0	2	0	16	3
Reading	2017–18	Championship	3	0	0	0	1	0	–		4	0
Reading	Total		15	3	0	0	3	0	2	0	20	3
Ajaccio	2018–19	Ligue 2	27	0	0	0	2	0	–		29	0
Ajaccio	2019–20	Ligue 2	5	0	0	0	2	1	–		7	1
Ajaccio	Total		32	0	0	0	4	1	0	0	36	1
Chamois Niortais	2020–21	Ligue 2	23	1	1	0	—		0	0	24	1
Chamois Niortais	2021–22	Ligue 2	15	3	— (Note: Niort excluded from the 2021–22 Coupe de France)		—		—		15	3
Chamois Niortais	Total		38	4	1	0	0	0	0	0	39	4
Career total			208	25	7	2	8	1	2	0	225	28

=== International ===
Scores and results list Guinea-Bissau's goal tally first, score column indicates score after each Mendes goal.

List of international goals scored by Joseph Mendes
No.	Date	Venue	Opponent	Score	Result	Competition
1	4 September 2019	Estádio Nacional 12 de Julho, São Tomé, São Tomé and Príncipe	São Tomé and Príncipe	1–0	1–0	2022 FIFA World Cup qualification
2	10 September 2019	Estádio 24 de Setembro, Bissau, Guinea-Bissau	São Tomé and Príncipe	1–1	2–1	2022 FIFA World Cup qualification
3	10 September 2019	Estádio 24 de Setembro, Bissau, Guinea-Bissau	São Tomé and Príncipe	2–1	2–1	2022 FIFA World Cup qualification
4	1 September 2021	Stade Olympique, Nouakchott, Mauritania	Guinea	1–1	1–1	2022 FIFA World Cup qualification
