= Jerel =

Jerel is a male given name. Notable people with this name include:

- Jerel Blassingame (born 1981), American basketball player
- Jerel Ifil (born 1982), English football player
- Jerel McNeal (born 1987), American basketball player
- Jerel Myers (born 1981), American American football player
- Jerel Worthy (born 1990), American American football player

== See also ==
- Jerell, given name
- Jerrel, given name
