= Andy Rinomhota =

Zimbabwe international footballer (born 1997)

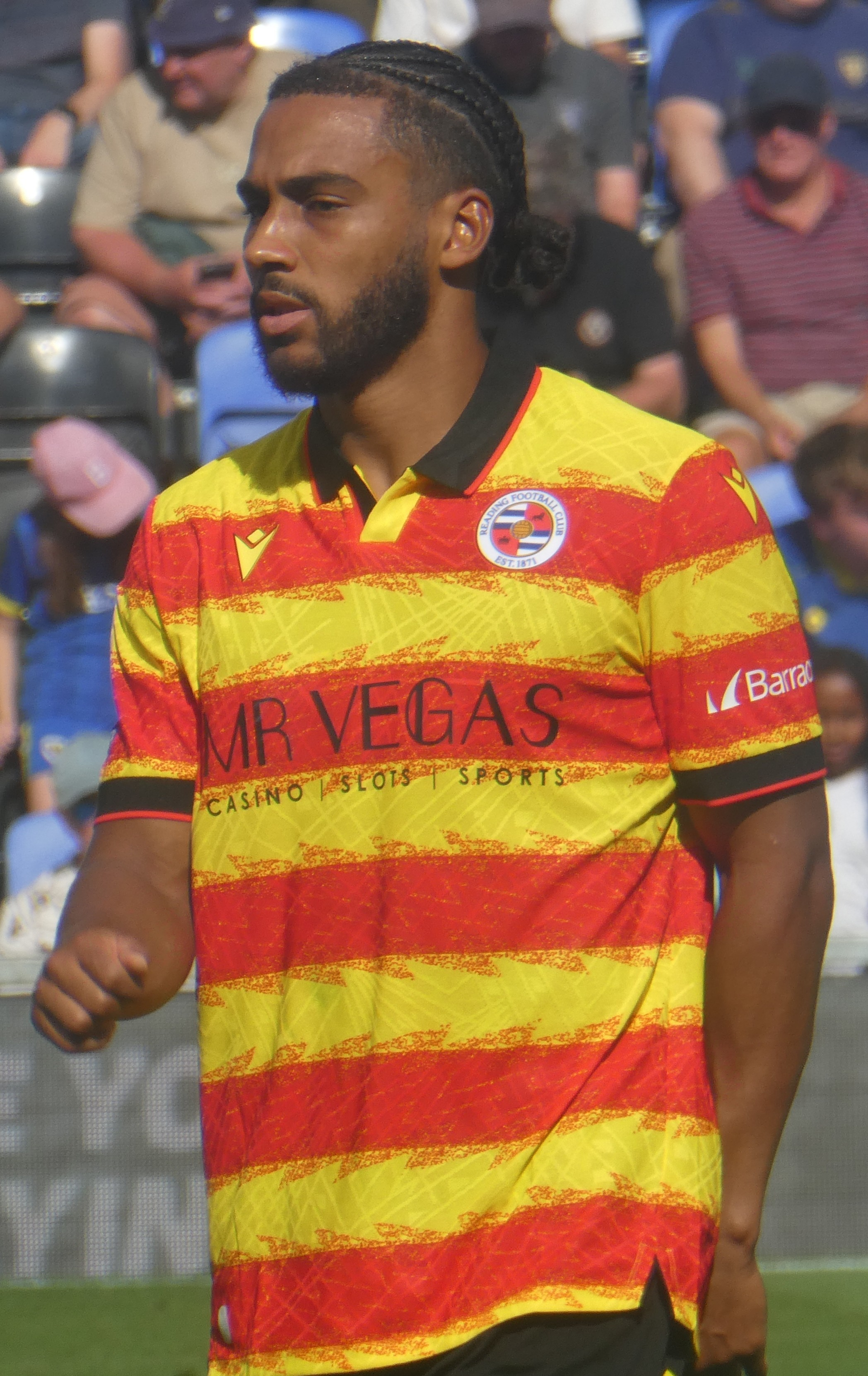
- Andy Rinomhota with Reading in 2026

Personal information
- Full name: Andrew Farai Rinomhota
- Date of birth: 21 April 1997 (age 29)
- Place of birth: Leeds, England
- Height: 1.75 m (5 ft 9 in)
- Position: Midfielder

Team information
- Current team: Reading
- Number: 4

Youth career
- –2014: AFC Portchester
- 2015–2018: Reading

Senior career*
Years	Team	Apps	(Gls)
2014–2015	AFC Portchester	30	(10)
2018–2022	Reading	125	(3)
2022–2025	Cardiff City	72	(0)
2024	→ Rotherham United (loan)	16	(0)
2025–	Reading	9	(0)

International career^{‡}
2023–	Zimbabwe	15	(0)
- * Club domestic league appearances and goals as of 09:15, 29 September 2025 (UTC) ‡ National team caps and goals as of 09:15, 29 September 2025 (UTC)

Andrew Farai Rinomhota (born 21 April 1997) is a professional footballer who plays as a midfielder for EFL League One club Reading. Born in England, he plays for the Zimbabwe national team.

== Club career ==
Rinomhota was born in Leeds, West Yorkshire, to a Zimbabwean father and an English mother. He started his career in the youth team of A.F.C. Portchester before he was promoted to the first team in the Wessex League due to an injury crisis. After impressing for the first team, scoring ten goals in 30 league games, manager Graham Rix contacted EFL Championship club Reading to send a scout to watch Rinomhota in action, which subsequently resulted in a two-week trial. In April 2015, he signed for Reading on an initial two-year contract with the option of a further twelve-month extension. He spent the majority of his first season with the club with under-18 and under-21 sides, moving up to the under-23 side in the 2016–17 season to play for the side in the EFL Trophy, amassing a total of thirty-nine appearances in all competitions. He was promoted to the first team in the summer of 2017 and joined the side on the pre-season tour of the Netherlands. In August 2017, he made his professional debut in the 2–0 EFL Cup win over Gillingham, playing the full ninety minutes. On 8 December 2017, Rinomhota signed a new contract with Reading until the summer of 2021. On 25 February 2019, Rinomhota signed a new three-year contract with Reading, lasting until the summer of 2022. Rinomhota scored his first goal for Reading against top of the table Norwich City on 10 April 2019 in the last minute of added time (90+7') in a 2–2 draw at Carrow Road. After an exceptional debut season, Rinomhota was awarded the 2018–19 player of the season.

On 24 June 2022, it was announced that Rinomhota would join Welsh club Cardiff City on a three-year deal from 1 July 2022.

Rinomhota joined Rotherham United on loan until the end of the season on transfer deadline day, 1 February 2024.

He won Players' Player of the Season during the 2024-25 season, when Cardiff were relegated to EFL League One. On 21 June 2025, the club announced he would be leaving at the end of the month when his contract expired.

On 12 November 2025, Rinomhota returned to Reading, on a deal until the end of the season to link-up with his former manager Leam Richardson from his loan spell at Rotherham United who replaced Noel Hunt on 28 October 2025. On 14 June 2026, Rinomhota extended his contract with Reading until the summer of 2027.

== International career ==
In December 2017, Zimbabwe explored the option of convincing Rinomhota to represent them at international level, which he is qualified to play for through his father. In May 2018, Rinomhota was named in Zimbabwe's provisional squad for the 2018 COSAFA Cup. However, Zimbabwe faced difficulties in getting Rinomhota into their squad, as Zimbabwean law required him to renounce his British citizenship in order to get a local passport. He eventually made his debut for Zimbabwe on 19 November 2023 in a 2026 World Cup qualifier against Nigeria played in Rwanda.

On 11 December 2025, Rinomhota was called by Zimbabwe for their participation in the 2025 Africa Cup of Nations.

== Career statistics ==
As of match played 19 September 2026

Appearances and goals by club, season and competition
Club	Season	League			Cup		League Cup		Other		Total	
Club	Season	Division	Apps	Goals	Apps	Goals	Apps	Goals	Apps	Goals	Apps	Goals
Reading	2015–16	Championship	0	0	0	0	0	0	—		0	0
Reading	2016–17	Championship	0	0	0	0	0	0	0	0	0	0
Reading	2017–18	Championship	0	0	0	0	2	0	—		2	0
Reading	2018–19	Championship	26	1	1	0	1	0	—		28	1
Reading	2019–20	Championship	37	1	5	1	3	0	—		45	2
Reading	2020–21	Championship	42	1	0	0	1	0	—		43	1
Reading	2021–22	Championship	20	0	1	0	0	0	—		21	0
Reading	Total		125	3	7	1	7	0	0	0	139	4
Cardiff City	2022–23	Championship	39	0	2	0	0	0	0	0	41	0
Cardiff City	2023–24	Championship	3	0	1	0	3	0	0	0	7	0
Cardiff City	2024–25	Championship	30	0	2	0	2	0	—		34	0
Cardiff City	Total		72	0	5	0	5	0	0	0	82	0
Rotherham United (loan)	2023–24	Championship	16	0	—		—		—		16	0
Reading	2025–26	League One	3	0	0	0	0	0	0	0	3	0
Reading	2026–27	League One	6	0	0	0	1	0	0	0	7	0
Reading	Total		9	0	0	0	1	0	0	0	10	0
Career total			222	3	12	1	13	0	0	0	247	4

=== International ===
As of match played 28 September 2025

Appearances and goals by national team and year
National team	Year	Apps	Goals
Zimbabwe	2023	1	0
Zimbabwe	2024	10	0
Zimbabwe	2025	2	0
Zimbabwe	2026	2	0
Total		15	0
