= Dai Xiuli =

Chinese businesswoman

Dai Xiuli (Chinese: 戴秀丽 / 秀丽·霍肯) is a Chinese businesswoman. She is the minority owner of Reading.

== Career ==
In 2021, Dai became minority owner of English side Reading.
