= Jarell =

Jarell is the name of:

- Jarell Carter (born 1995), American football cornerback
- Jarell Christian (born 1986), American former professional basketball player
- Jarell Eddie (born 1991), American professional basketball player
- Jarell Houston or J-Boog (born 1985), American R&B singer
- Jarell Martin (born 1994), American professional basketball player
- Jarell Quansah (born 2003), English association footballer

== See also ==
- Jerell, given name
