= Mary von Schrader Jarrell =

American patron of the arts and memoirist

- Born: May 2, 1914
- Died: July 30, 2007 (aged 93)
- Spouse: Randall Jarrell

Mary von Schrader Jarrell (May 2, 1914 – July 30, 2007) was an American patron of the arts and memoirist. She was the widow of Randall Jarrell and worked consistently to memorialize his impact not only on herself but on the very world of American poetry.

== Biography ==
Mary von Schrader Jarrell was born Mary Eloise von Schrader on May 2, 1914, in St. Louis, Missouri to parents Colonel Alleyne von Schrader and Irene McNeal Bond. By 1930, von Schrader was living with her parents in Long Beach, California. She was a Montessori alumni and a graduate of Stanford where she reported that she studied as a philosophy major and English minor.

On June 18, 1936, von Schrader married William Melville Garton Jr. Their marriage was not to last. In July 1951, Mary Eloise (von Schrader) Garton became divorced from William Garton Jr.

Quickly after this, Mary von Schrader met and fell in love with Randall Jarrell. The two were married by November 1952. Randall Jarrell and Mary von Schrader met at a three-week writer's conference at the University of Colorado at Boulder, where Randall Jarrell was already considered an established poet-critic and Mary was exploring her art.

Mary Jarrell stated that for the two of them it was love at first sight and that he soon gave her the manuscript for Seven League Crutches which was still in long script. They spent time together reviewing, drinking and talking. They came to call themselves, as they would for the rest of their time together, a “group of two” (Jarrell, M., Remembering). They moved around the country some in accordance with the various teaching jobs and positions of Randall Jarrell until finally settling down in Greensboro, North Carolina where Jarrell held his final position at the University of North Carolina at Greensboro (Burt). There, they remained together, with the exception of Randall Jarrell's hospital stays, until the shocking and sudden death of Randall Jarrell in 1965 when he was struck by a car (Jarrell, M. Remembering).

Mary von S. Jarrell did not marry again. She worked on her own writing and memorializing her second husband's work.

At the age of 93, Mary von Schrader Jarrell died on July 30, 2007, at the Well-Springs Retirement Community.

== Writing ==
Before her marriage to Randall Jarrell, Mary von S. Jarrell had already written three unpublished novels, which she called her “unfinished cathedrals” and was a well-honed writer, but with her experience in working with Jarrell's work, Mary became dedicated to the act of memorializing Randall Jarrell's works even further after his death (Jarrell, M., Remembering).

In the few years after Randall Jarrell's death she completed Jerome, The Biography of a Poem, in 1971, The Knee-Baby in 1973, Randall Jarrell’s Letters in 1988, Randall’s Letters, Expanded and published some of her poetry and essays in literary magazines such as Harpers.

The Greensboro Central Library awarded her with a life-size portrait of her husband as a part of their mural of outstanding residents, naming her “a Greensboro author and library supporter whose writing and lectures have kept alive her husband’s legacy.” She was also presented with the “Angel of the Literary Arts” award in 1998 by the North Carolina Writer's Network.

In 1999, she published a memoir, Remembering Randall (1999). In reviewing the book, The New Yorker described it as a "rhapsodic, intently detailed memoir of her dream poet". The New York Times said "In its selective details the memoir is more of a sundial than a weather report" and "it is in his words more than hers - he was the writer, after all - that we catch a glimpse of her constancy and behind it, her own pain."

== Bibliography ==
- Jerome, The Biography of a Poem (1971)
- The Knee-Baby (1973) 0374442444,9780374442446
- Randall Jarrell's Letters (1988)
- Randall's Letters, Expanded
- Remembering Randall (1999)

== Sources ==
- Burt, Stephen. Randall Jarrell and His Age. New York: Columbia UP, 2002. Print.
- Jarrell, Mary von Schrader. “Another Endangered Species: Reflections on Editing Randall Jarrell’s Letters.” Originally in Crossroads, 2002. Web. 20 Apr. 2012.
- Jarrell, Mary von Schrader. Remembering Randall. New York: Harper, 1999. Print.
