= Richard Bakary =

Beninese footballer

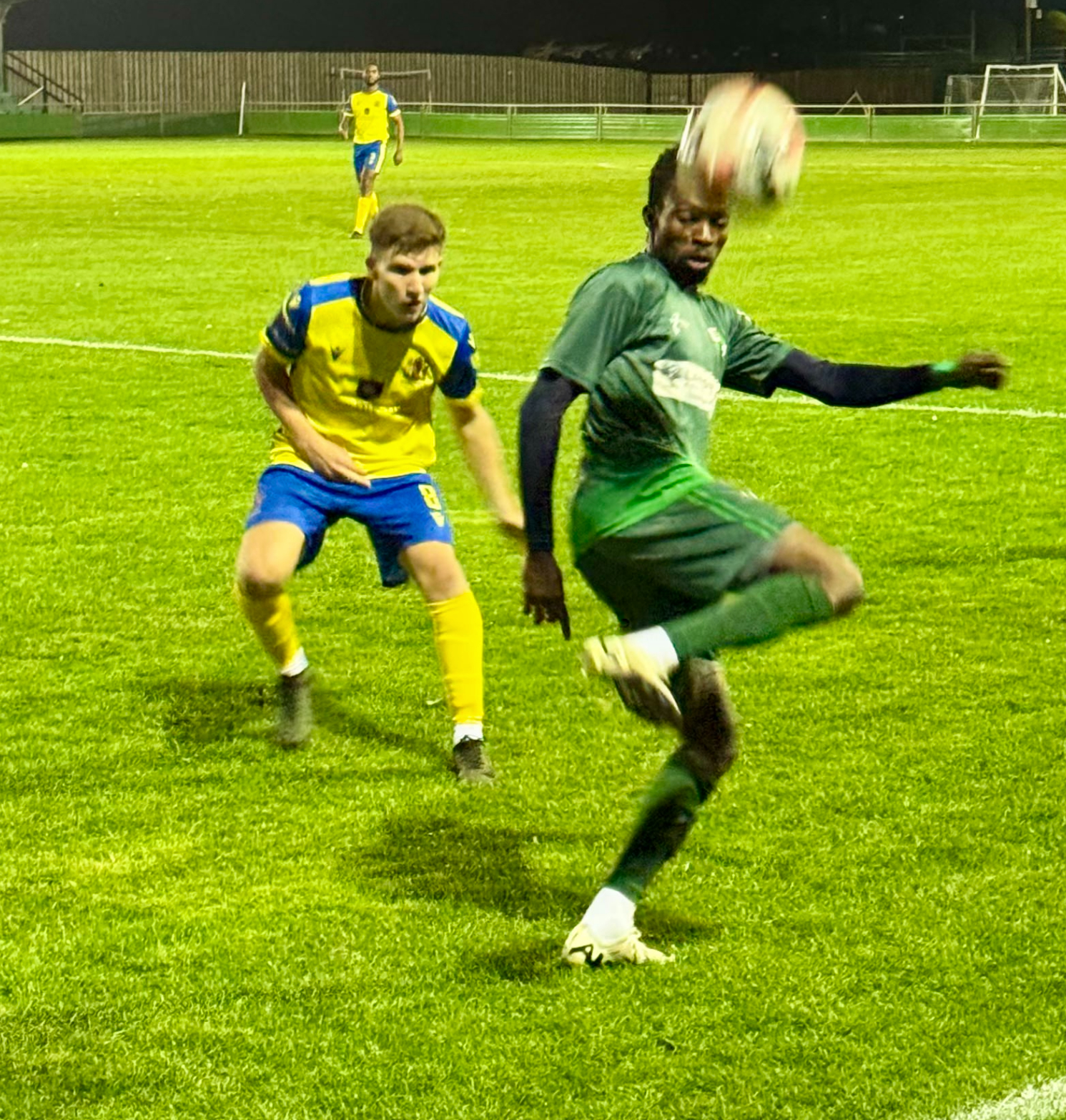
- Bakary (right) in action in 2025

Personal information
- Full name: Mohamed Richard Bakary
- Date of birth: 17 October 1997 (age 29)
- Place of birth: Porto-Novo, Benin
- Position: Winger

Team information
- Current team: Totton & Eling

Youth career
- –2012: Welling United
- 2012–2014: Chelsea
- 2014–2018: Southampton

Senior career*
Years	Team	Apps	(Gls)
2019–2020	AFC Totton	16	(2)
2022	Blackfield & Langley	9	(5)
2023	Alresford Town	8	(2)
2023–2024	Lymington Town	29	(4)
2024–2025	Bournemouth FC	20	(6)
2025–2026	Blackfield & Langley	19	(3)
2026–	Totton & Eling	2	(0)

International career^{‡}
2017	Benin	1	(0)
- * Club domestic league appearances and goals as of 08:35, 26 August 2026 (UTC) ‡ National team caps and goals as of 18:56, 24 March 2017 (UTC)

Mohamed Richard Bakary (born 17 October 1997) is a footballer who plays as a winger for Totton & Eling. He has represented Benin at senior international level.

== Club career ==
Having started his career as an attacking player he signed for Chelsea before Southampton swooped and converted him to a defensive player during his 4 years with club. But at the end of the 2017–18 season, his contract with Southampton was not renewed. He made no first team appearances for the club but made many appearances for the U23's before his release.

On 5 September 2019, Bakary joined A.F.C. Totton.

Bakary featured for Blackfield & Langley in 2022. The following year, he was featuring for Alresford Town having dual-registered with the club from Winchester City. Bakary was playing for Wessex League side Lymington Town in March 2024.

On 20 July 2024, Bakary signed for Bournemouth FC. He finished the season with Blackfield & Langley and resigned for them ahead of the new season.

On 28 July 2026, Bakary signed for Totton & Eling.

== International career ==
He represented Benin in a friendly match against Mauritania on 24 March 2017.
