= Jerrell =

Jerrell is a masculine given name. Notable people with the given name include:

- Jerrell Freeman (born 1986), American football player
- Jerrell Gavins (born 1988), Canadian football player
- Jerrell Harris (born 1989), American football player
- Jerrell Jackson (born 1990), American football player
- Jerrell Powe (born 1987), American football player

== See also ==
- Michael Jerrell (born 1999), American football player
- Jerell, given name
- Jerrel, given name
