= Joey van den Berg =

Dutch footballer (born 1986)

Personal information
- Full name: Joey van den Berg
- Date of birth: 13 February 1986 (age 40)
- Place of birth: Nijeveen, Netherlands
- Height: 1.85 m (6 ft 1 in)
- Position: Defensive midfielder

Youth career
- SVN '69
- Heerenveen

Senior career*
Years	Team	Apps	(Gls)
2005–2006	Heerenveen	2	(0)
2006	Omniworld	19	(1)
2006–2007	MSC		
2007–2008	Go Ahead Eagles	11	(1)
2008–2010	Alcides		
2010–2013	PEC Zwolle	73	(15)
2013–2016	Heerenveen	97	(8)
2016–2019	Reading	61	(1)
2018–2019	→ NEC (loan)	28	(1)
2019	NEC	1	(0)
2020	Alcides	3	(0)
Total		262	(25)
- * Club domestic league appearances and goals

Joey van den Berg (born 13 February 1986) is a Dutch retired footballer who played as a defensive midfielder. He played professional football for SC Heerenveen, FC Omniworld, Go Ahead Eagles, PEC Zwolle and Reading. (Note: Joey van den Berg at WorldFootball.net)

== Career ==
=== Dutch Club Career ===
A tough-tackling defensive midfielder, Van den Berg received a record-equaling 7th Eredivisie red card in March 2016.

=== Reading ===
On 28 June 2016, it was announced that Reading would sign Van den Berg on a two-year contract after his current deal expired at SC Heerenveen and when the transfer window officially opened on 1 July 2016. He scored his first goal for Reading in a 2–0 EFL Cup win against Plymouth Argyle on 9 August 2016. On 27 September 2017, van den Berg extended his contract with Reading until the summer of 2019.

On 25 July 2018, van den Berg joined NEC in the Dutch Eerste Divisie on a season-long loan deal.

He was released by Reading at the end of the 2018–19 season.

=== NEC ===
After his release by Reading in July 2019, he rejoined his old club, NEC on a two-year contract. However, after only one month, the club's director, Wilco van Schaik, indicated to the veteran, that his salary weighed heavily on the budget and that NEC therefore was prepared to allow Van den Berg to leave transfer-free. that other, younger players will be preferred for the time being. In addition, Van den Berg had to give up his shirt number 8. Van den Berg revealed in the medias, that the coaches suddenly told him, that "you get little playing time this season". On 4 November 2019, his contract was terminated.

=== Alcides ===
After three months without a club, van den Berg signed a deal with Dutch amateur club MVV Alcides - the club he also played for in - on 3 February 2020, after failing to find a professional club during the January transfer market.

On 20 September 2020 the club confirmed, that van den Berg suffered from knee problems and probably wouldn't play for the club anymore. However, he would continue to participate in the trainings.

== Career statistics ==
=== Club ===
As of match played 15 March 2019.

Appearances and goals by club, season and competition
Club	Season	League			National Cup		League Cup		Other		Total	
Club	Season	Division	Apps	Goals	Apps	Goals	Apps	Goals	Apps	Goals	Apps	Goals
PEC Zwolle	2010–11	Eerste Divisie	27	5	2	0	-		4	0	33	5
PEC Zwolle	2011–12	Eerste Divisie	30	7	1	0	-		-		31	7
PEC Zwolle	2012–13	Eredivisie	16	3	1	0	-		-		17	3
PEC Zwolle	Total		73	15	4	0	-	-	4	0	81	15
SC Heerenveen	2012–13	Eredivisie	13	0	0	0	-		2	0	15	0
SC Heerenveen	2013–14	Eredivisie	29	2	2	0	-		2	0	33	2
SC Heerenveen	2014–15	Eredivisie	29	2	1	0	-		4	0	34	2
SC Heerenveen	2015–16	Eredivisie	26	4	3	0	-		-		29	4
SC Heerenveen	Total		97	8	6	0	-	-	8	0	111	8
Reading	2016–17	Championship	28	0	1	0	2	1	3	0	34	1
Reading	2017–18	Championship	33	1	1	0	0	0	–		34	1
Reading	Total		61	1	2	0	2	1	3	0	68	2
NEC (loan)	2018–19	Eerste Divisie	24	0	1	0	-		-		25	0
Career total			255	24	13	0	2	1	15	0	285	25

== Honours ==
PEC Zwolle

- Eerste Divisie (1): 2011–12
