= Jerrel Yakel =

American neuroscientist

Jerry Yakel is an American neuroscientist currently at National Institutes of Health and an Elected Fellow of the American Association for the Advancement of Science.
