= Jerrel Wolfgang =

Dutch footballer

Personal information
- Date of birth: 8 January 1984 (age 42)
- Place of birth: Almelo, Netherlands
- Height: 1.83 m (6 ft 0 in)
- Position: Centre-back

Youth career
- VV Hardegarijp
- –2004: SC Heerenveen

Senior career*
Years	Team	Apps	(Gls)
2004–2006	SC Heerenveen U21/U23		
2004–2006	SC Heerenveen	0	(0)
2005–2006	Helmond Sport (loan)	11	(0)
2006–2009	VV Sneek		
2009–2011	FC Den Helder		

International career
2004–2005	Netherlands U21	3	(0)
- * Club domestic league appearances and goals

Jerrel Wolfgang (born 8 January 1984) is a Dutch former professional footballer who played for Eerste Divisie club Helmond Sport during the 2005–06 season.
