= 2023–24 C.F. Os Belenenses season =

C.F. Os Belenenses
2023–24 season
- Manager: Bruno Dias (until 4 November); Vasco Faísca (from 6 November to 28 February); Mariano Barreto (from 29 February)
- Stadium: Estádio do Restelo
- Liga Portugal 2: 18th (relegated)
- Taça de Portugal: Third round
- Taça da Liga: Second round
- Top goalscorer: League: Ricardo Matos (5); All: Ricardo Matos (5)
- Biggest defeat: Os Belenenses 0–5 União de Leiria; Nacional 5–0 Os Belenenses

The 2023–24 season was the 105th season in the history of Clube de Futebol Os Belenenses and first season back in the Liga Portugal 2.

== Transfers ==
=== In ===
Pos.	Player	Transferred from	Fee	Date	Source
DF	(Brazil) Fabão	(Brazil) Portuguesa-RJ		1 July 2023	
MF	(Senegal) Moha Keita	(Spain) Sabadell		4 July 2023	
DF	(Malta) Cain Attard	(Malta) Birkirkara		6 July 2023	
DF	(Portugal) Rui Correia	(Portugal) Estrela da Amadora		12 July 2023	
FW	(Portugal) Zequinha	(Portugal) Vitória Setúbal		22 January 2024	

== Pre-season and friendlies ==
7 July 2023 Friendly	Os Belenenses (Portugal)	3–1	(Portugal) Os Belenenses U19
	Chapi Romano; Pina; Midana Sambú

12 July 2023 Friendly	1º Dezembro (Portugal)	1–0	(Portugal) Os Belenenses
14:00

15 July 2023 Friendly	Estoril (Portugal)	2–1	(Portugal) Os Belenenses	Estoril
	Cassiano 45'; Pereira 85'		Sambú 55'	Stadium: Estádio António Coimbra da Mota

26 July 2023 Friendly	Os Belenenses (Portugal)	6–1	(Portugal) Oriental

2 August 2023 Friendly	Os Belenenses (Portugal)	1–3	(Angola) Petro de Luanda	Lisbon
17:00	86'		Gilberto 57', 59'; Apado 87'	Stadium: Estádio do Restelo

5 August 2023 Friendly	Os Belenenses (Portugal)	4–1	(Portugal) Estrela da Amadora	Oeiras
	Serra 4'; Matos 60'; Pina 63'; Moninhas 90'	Report	Keliano 8'	Stadium: Cidade do Futebol

== Competitions ==
=== Overall record ===
Competition	First match	Last match	Starting round	Final position	Record							
Competition	First match	Last match	Starting round	Final position	Pld	W	D	L	GF	GA	GD	Win %
Liga Portugal 2	12 August 2023	17 May 2024	Matchday 1	18th	34	6	8	20	28	59	−31	17.65
Taça de Portugal	24 September 2023	22 October 2023	Second round	Third round	2	1	0	1	2	2	+0	50.00
Taça da Liga	23 July 2023	29 July 2023	First round	Second round	2	1	0	1	4	7	−3	50.00
Total					38	8	8	22	34	68	−34	21.05

Source: Competitions

=== Liga Portugal 2 ===
==== League table ====
Pos	Team	Pld	W	D	L	GF	GA	GD	Pts	Promotion or relegation
14	Leixões	34	7	16	11	29	38	−9	37	
15	Oliveirense	34	8	10	16	37	54	−17	34	
16	Feirense (O)	34	8	7	19	31	49	−18	31	Qualification for relegation play-offs
17	Länk Vilaverdense (Note: Länk Vilaverdense were deducted 1 point for financial irregularities.) (R)	34	8	4	22	30	59	−29	27	Relegation to Liga 3
18	Belenenses (R)	34	6	8	20	28	59	−31	26	Relegation to Liga 3

Source: Liga Portugal 2
Rules for classification: 1) Points; 2) Head-to-head points; 3) Head-to-head goal difference; 4) Head-to-head away goals scored; 5) Goal difference; 6) Matches won; 7) Goals scored; 8) Play-off.
(O) Play-off winners; (R) Relegated

==== Results summary ====
Overall								Home						Away					
Pld	W	D	L	GF	GA	GD	Pts	W	D	L	GF	GA	GD	W	D	L	GF	GA	GD
34	6	8	20	28	59	−31	26	4	4	9	15	26	−11	2	4	11	13	33	−20

==== Matches ====
The league fixtures were unveiled on 5 July 2023.

12 August 2023 1	AVS	1–0	Os Belenenses	Vila das Aves
18:00				Stadium: Estádio do CD Aves; Referee: João Pedro Pinheiro

20 August 2023 2	Os Belenenses	1–1	Porto B	Lisbon
14:00				Stadium: Estádio do Restelo; Referee: Bruno Pires Costa

26 August 2023 3	Os Belenenses	1–1	Mafra	Lisbon
15:30				Stadium: Estádio do Restelo; Referee: Vitor Ferreira

1 September 2023 4	Tondela	0–1	Os Belenenses	Tondela
				Stadium: Estádio Dr. Magalhães Pessoa

17 September 2023 5	Os Belenenses	0–5	União de Leiria	Lisbon
				Stadium: Estádio do Restelo

2 October 2023 6	Torreense	2–2	Os Belenenses

8 October 2023 7	Os Belenenses	1–2	Marítimo	Lisbon
				Stadium: Estádio do Restelo

28 October 2023 8	Leixões	1–0	Os Belenenses

4 November 2023 9	Os Belenenses	0–2	Länk Vilaverdense	Lisbon
				Stadium: Estádio do Restelo

10 November 2023 10	Feirense	1–0	Os Belenenses

19 November 2023 11	Os Belenenses	2–0	Penafiel	Lisbon
14:00	Matos 7'; Maxuel 90+6'			Stadium: Estádio do Restelo; Referee: Márcio Torres

1 December 2023 12	Académico de Viseu	3–1	Os Belenenses	Viseu
18:00				Stadium: Estádio do Fontelo; Referee: Ricardo Baixinho

10 December 2023 13	Os Belenenses	1–0	Oliveirense	Lisbon
				Stadium: Estádio do Restelo

16 December 2023 14	Nacional	5–0	Os Belenenses	Funchal
				Stadium: Estádio da Madeira

22 December 2023 15	Os Belenenses	0–0	Santa Clara	Lisbon
				Stadium: Estádio do Restelo

6 January 2024 16	Benfica B	2–1	Os Belenenses	Seixal
15:30				Stadium: Benfica Campus; Referee: Rui Lima

13 January 2024 17	Os Belenenses	0–1	Paços de Ferreira	Lisbon
14:00			Fonte 90+1'	Stadium: Estádio do Restelo; Referee: Flávio Duarte

20 January 2024 18	Os Belenenses	1–3	AVS	Lisbon
14:00	Carvalho 29'		Paraíba 8', 63'; Nenê 47'	Stadium: Estádio do Restelo; Referee: João Afonso

28 January 2024 19	Porto B	3–0	Paços de Ferreira	Vila Nova de Gaia
15:30				Stadium: Estádio Luís Filipe Menezes; Referee: Pedro Ramalho

2 February 2024 20	Mafra	1–1	Os Belenenses	Mafra
20:45				Stadium: Estádio Municipal; Referee: Gonçalo Neves

11 February 2024 21	Os Belenenses	0–0	Tondela	Lisbon
				Stadium: Estádio do Restelo

17 February 2024 22	União de Leiria	4–2	Os Belenenses

25 February 2024 23	Os Belenenses	0–2	Torreense	Lisbon
				Stadium: Estádio do Restelo

5 March 2024 25	Marítimo	1–1	Os Belenenses	Funchal
	Euller 16'		Keita 71'	Stadium: Estádio do Marítimo

11 March 2024 25	Os Belenenses	1–2	Leixões	Lisbon
				Stadium: Estádio do Restelo

18 March 2024 26	Länk FC Vilaverdense	1–1	Os Belenenses	Coimbra
20:15				Stadium: Estádio Cidade de Coimbra; Referee: David Silva

29 March 2024 27	Os Belenenses	3–1	Feirense	Lisbon
11:00				Stadium: Estádio do Restelo; Referee: Bruno Pires Costa

6 April 2024 28	Penafiel	3–0	Os Belenenses	Penafiel
11:00	André Silva 49'; Robinho 54' (pen.); Gabriel Barbosa 81'			Stadium: Estádio Municipal 25 de Abril; Referee: José Bessa

13 April 2024 29	Os Belenenses	1–0	Académico de Viseu	Lisbon
11:00	Matos 66'			Stadium: Estádio do Restelo; Referee: Vitor Ferreira

21 April 2024 30	Oliveirense	1–2	Os Belenenses	Oliveira de Azeméis
11:00				Stadium: Estádio Carlos Osório; Referee: Tiago Martins

28 April 2024 31	Os Belenenses	1–3	Nacional	Lisbon
15:30				Stadium: Estádio do Restelo; Referee: António Nobre

3 May 2024 32	Santa Clara	2–0	Os Belenenses	Ponta Delgada
18:00	Calila 53'; Almeida 63'			Stadium: Estádio de São Miguel; Referee: Fabio Melo

10 May 2024 33	Os Belenenses	2–3	Benfica B	Lisbon
18:00	Pina 35' (pen.); Matos 42'		Bajrami 44'; Félix 63'; Pereira 73'	Stadium: Estádio do Restelo; Referee: André Narciso

17 May 2024 34	Paços de Ferreira	2–1	Os Belenenses	Paços de Ferreira
18:00				Stadium: Estádio da Mata Real; Referee: Sérgio Guelho

=== Taça de Portugal ===
24 September 2023	Quarteirense SAD	0–1	Os Belenenses	Quarteira
15:00				Stadium: Estádio Municipal de Quarteira

22 October 2023	Os Belenenses	1–2	Gil Vicente	Lisbon
17:00	Sambú 1', (yellow card) 60'; Maxuel (yellow card) 34'; Manso (yellow card) 39'		Wilson (yellow card) 51'; Baturina 68'; Fujimoto (yellow card) 74', (goal) 87'	Stadium: Estádio do Restelo; Referee: Nuno Miguel Serrano Almeida

=== Taça da Liga ===
23 July 2023 First round	Os Belenenses	3–2	Famalicão	Lisbon
18:00	Attard (yellow card) 2', (goal) 14'; Akas 61'; Danny (yellow card) 72'; Valente 90+11' (pen.); Keita (yellow card) 90+14'		Riccieli 31'; Pablo (yellow card) 52'; Cádiz 67'; Sá (yellow card) 24' (yellow-red card) 90+1'	Stadium: Estádio do Restelo; Referee: Fábio Melo

29 July 2023 Second round	Estoril	5–1	Os Belenenses	Estoril
20:30	Martins 45+2'; Araújo 56'; Feltes 64'; João Carlos 74', 89'		Valente (yellow card) 1', (penalty missed) 35'; Sambú 90+2'	Stadium: Estádio António Coimbra da Mota; Referee: Anzhony Rodrigues
