= Liam Moore =

Jamaican footballer (born 1993)

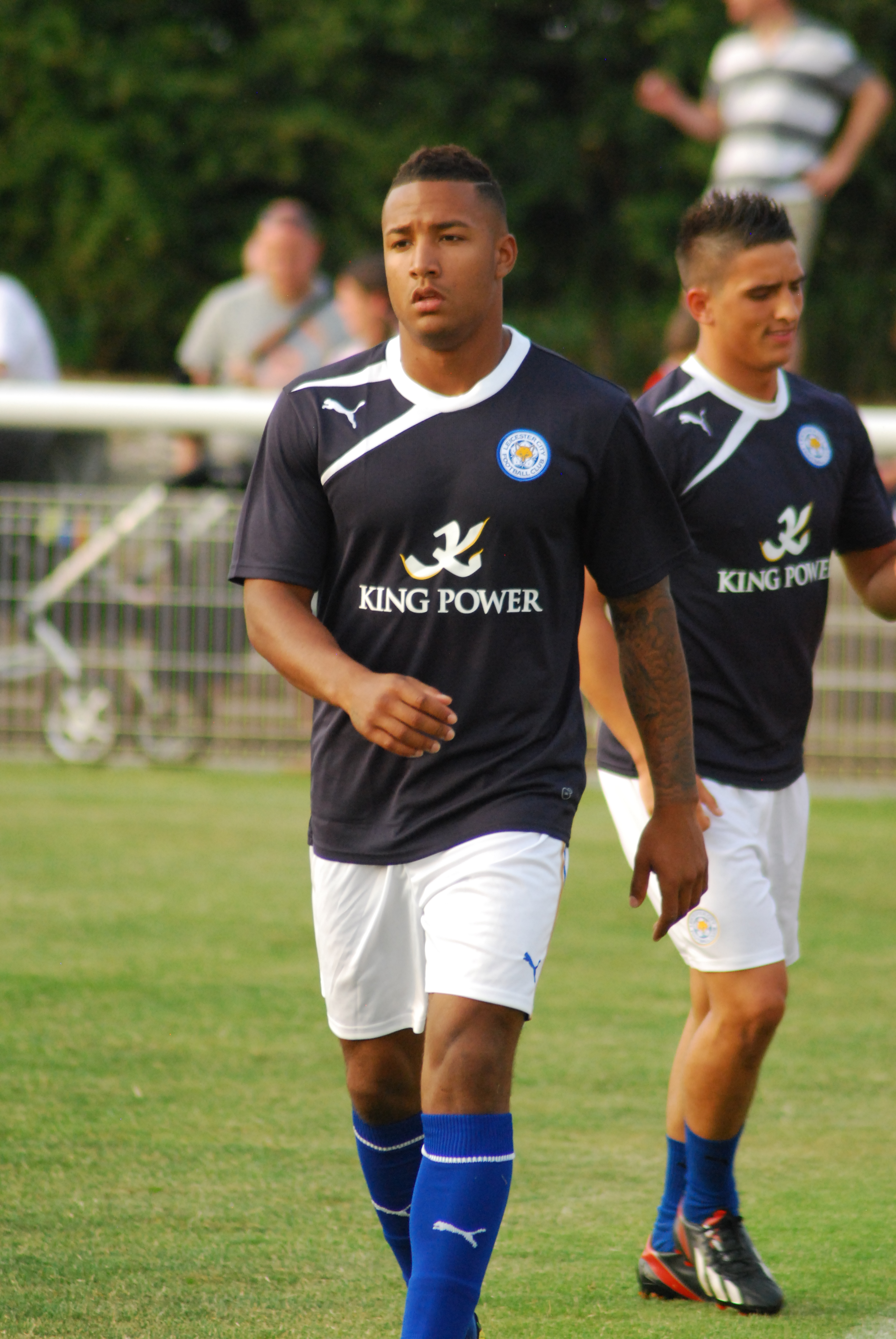
- Moore training with Leicester City in 2013

Personal information
- Full name: Liam Simon Moore
- Date of birth: 31 January 1993 (age 33)
- Place of birth: Loughborough, England
- Height: 1.85 m (6 ft 1 in)
- Position: Centre-back

Team information
- Current team: Spalding United

Youth career
- Leicester City

Senior career*
Years	Team	Apps	(Gls)
2011–2016	Leicester City	59	(1)
2011	→ Bradford City (loan)	17	(0)
2013	→ Brentford (loan)	7	(0)
2015	→ Brentford (loan)	3	(0)
2015–2016	→ Bristol City (loan)	10	(0)
2016–2023	Reading	219	(8)
2022	→ Stoke City (loan)	4	(0)
2024	Northampton Town	8	(0)
2024–	Spalding United	0	(0)
Total		327	(9)

International career
2009	England U17	3	(0)
2014	England U20	4	(0)
2012–2015	England U21	10	(1)
2021–2022	Jamaica	10	(0)
- * Club domestic league appearances and goals

Liam Simon Moore (born 31 January 1993) is a former professional footballer who plays as a centre-back for Spalding United. Born and raised in England, he represented Jamaica at international level.

== Club career ==
=== Leicester City ===
Born in Loughborough, Leicestershire, Moore began his career with Leicester City, joining the club when he was eight years old and his boyhood club. Moore was captain of the youth team that reached the quarter-finals of the 2010–11 FA Youth Cup. He appeared twice as an unused substitute for the first team throughout the 2010–11 season. By the summer of 2011, Moore graduated.

Moore signed a one-month loan contract with Bradford City on 5 August 2011. He made his senior debut on 6 August 2011 in a 2–1 defeat away to Aldershot Town. Moore quickly became a first team regular for the club before he lost his first place in his remaining months there. Moore's announced his desire to stay with Bradford City at the end of the initial month's duration, and his loan was later extended until 31 December 2011. Moore returned to his parent club following the end of his loan deal on 31 December 2011. Moore ended his Bradford loan with 22 appearances to his name.

After returning to Leicester, Moore made his debut for them two days later, starting the game against Crystal Palace on 2 January 2012. Two weeks later on 19 January 2012, he signed a contract with the club, keeping him until 2013. He did not make another appearance for Leicester until 28 April 2012, when he played in their 2–1 win against Leeds United.

Ahead of the 2012–13 season, Moore was allocated the number 22 shirt. He started in the first six matches of the 2012–13 season before dropped for two matches. After becoming a first-team regular at the start of the 2012–13 season, Moore was scouted by Arsenal, Manchester United, Tottenham Hotspur, Everton and Aston Villa. He signed a new three-year contract with the club in September 2012. Moore returned to the first team, coming on as a 28th-minute substitute, in a 2–1 win against Middlesbrough on 28 September 2012. In a follow–up match against Huddersfield Town, he set up a goal for Anthony Knockaert, who scored twice in a 2–0 win. By November, Moore soon found himself placed on the substitute bench and made only two appearances until being loaned out to Brentford.

On 20 February 2013, Moore joined Brentford on loan until the end of the 2012–13 season. He made his Brentford debut, starting the whole game, in a 2–1 win against Crawley Town on 26 February 2013. Moore became a first team regular for the club despite suffering from ankle injury along the way. Following his recall by his parent club, he made seven appearances that season.

Moore was recalled to Leicester on 30 March 2013 to act as cover during club captain Wes Morgan's suspension. Moore made his first appearance for the side since being loaned out, coming against Barnsley on 1 April 2013, as Leicester City lost 2–0. He then made two more appearances for the side, as the club were unsuccessful in the Championship Play–Offs.

Ahead of the 2013–14 season, Moore was allocated the number 18 shirt. At the start of the 2013–14 season, he regained his first team place, forming a centre–back partnership alongside Wes Morgan and then rotating to the right–back position. Moore scored his first ever senior goal for Leicester City on 14 September 2013, scoring the opener in an eventual 2–0 home victory over Wigan Athletic. His impressive performances early on in the 2013–14 season saw him being named the Football League Young Player of the Month for September 2013. Moore has credited club captain Wes Morgan and manager Nigel Pearson with his improved form.

In January 2014 he was the subject of transfer bids from Premier League club Fulham. However, during a 2–0 win against Middlesbrough on 25 January 2014, Moore suffered a rib injury and was substituted in the 9th minute as a result. He made his return to the first team on 22 February 2014 against Nottingham Forest, coming on as a 64th-minute substitute in a 2–2 draw. Since returning from injury, Moore found himself placed on the substitutes bench, due to the good form of Morgan and Marcin Wasilewski, only appearing five times for the club in the remaining matches of the 2013–14 season. Despite this, his contributions to Leicester City saw them get promoted to the Premier League. For his performance, making thirty–three appearances in all competitions, he was nominated for Football League's Young Player of the Year award but lost out to Will Hughes.

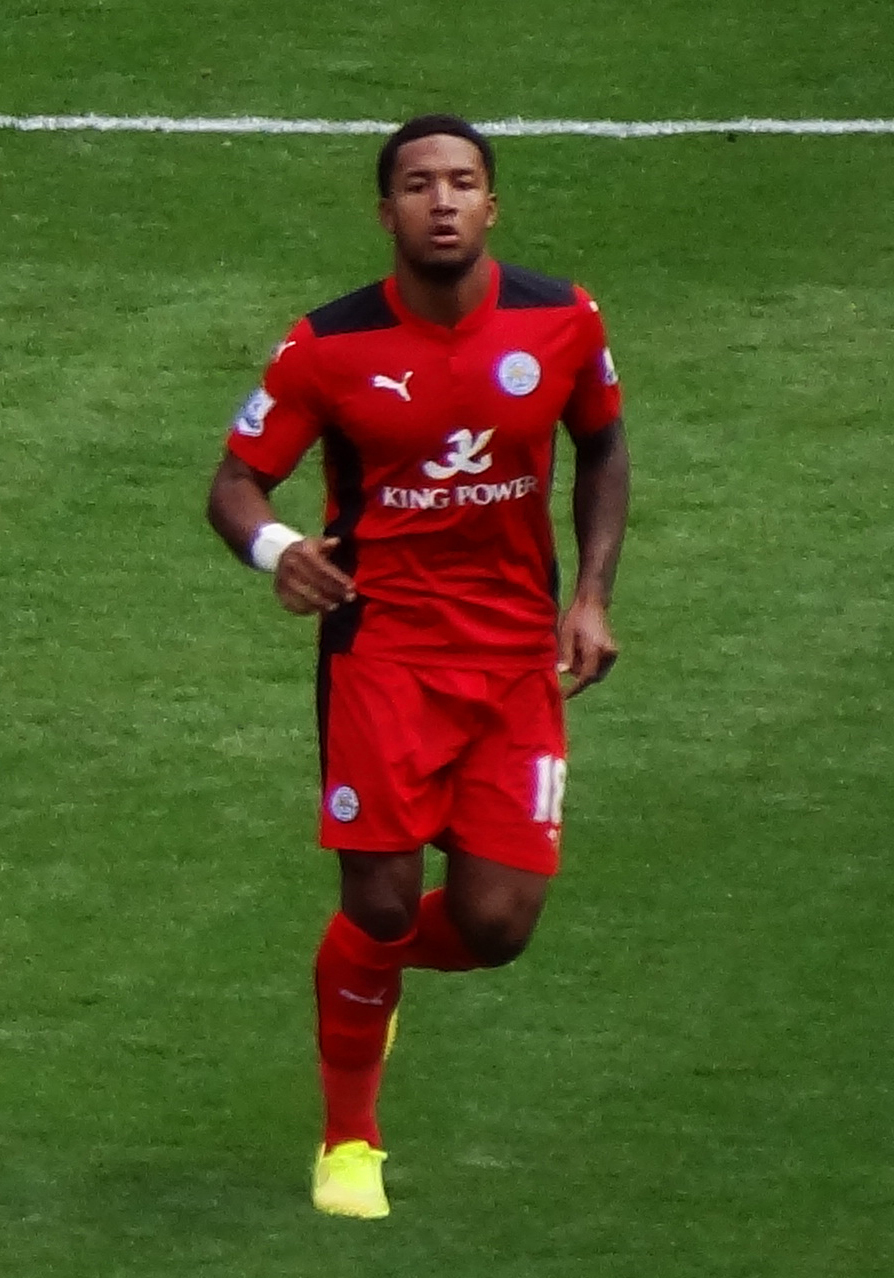
Moore playing for Leicester City in 2014.

Ahead of the 2014–15 season, Moore signed a contract extension with the club, keeping him until 2017. He then made his Premier League debut in Leicester's opening day, playing the entirety of a 2–2 draw at home to Everton on 16 August 2014. Moore then started in the next eight league matches for the side. However, he was dropped from the first team and was placed on the substitute bench. Moore also faced his own injury concern along the way.

On 26 February 2015, Moore joined Brentford on loan until the end of the 2014–15 season. He went straight into the starting line-up, displacing Harlee Dean, before being dropped from the squad in favour of Dean after three "stuttering" appearances. Moore failed to appear again and was recalled to the King Power Stadium on 2 April.

Moore made his only appearance of the 2015–16 season for Leicester City, coming against Bury in the second round of the League Cup at Gigg Lane, as they won 4–1. However, his first team opportunities was limited once again, due to strong competitions within the defence.

Moore signed on loan for Bristol City on 1 September 2015, until 4 January 2016. He made his debut for the club, starting a match and played 63 minutes before being substituted, in a 4–2 loss against Birmingham City on 12 September 2015. Since making his debut for Bristol City, Moore found himself in and out of the starting line–up for the side despite facing sidelined along the way. Having made ten appearances for Bristol City, he returned to his parent club.

Following his loan spell at Bristol City came to an end, he made no further appearances for the club before Leicester's Premier League trophy presentation on 7 May 2016, making him ineligible for a winner's medal (a minimum of five league games is required). Moore later reflected this in an interview with The Atlantic, saying: "It would have taken just five appearances to get a winners' medal, and that medal I would have cherished for ever. I remember crying, trying to hide my tears, but saying I would be back stronger for this. It was so difficult, but it was such an eye-opener. It will go down as an amazing day, but a tough day in my career. My family were coming and everyone was adamant I had played a part in how we had got to that point. Everything was great during the game (a 3-1 win over Everton), but it hit me when I wasn't on the podium — I hadn't played any minutes in the league (for Leicester) that season. The moment they said, 'And this season's Premier League champions are… Leicester City', and Wes lifted the trophy, it was one of the best and worst feelings in my life. I had just seen my boyhood club, the club that means so much to me, become champions, but I then realised that some of the decisions I had made in the past year had cost me the chance of being involved."

=== Reading ===
Moore signed a four-year contract with Reading on 20 August 2016 to seal a permanent switch from Leicester. The move was reported to be an undisclosed fee, which later to be revealed to have cost £1.5 million. Upon joining the club, he said Leicester City wanted him to stay but opted to leave for Reading.

Moore made his Reading debut, starting the whole game against Milton Keynes in the second round of the League Cup, and played throughout 120 minutes following a 2–2 draw and went on to win 4–2 in the penalty shootout. He made his the club's league debut, keeping a clean sheet, in a 1–0 win against Cardiff City on 27 August 2016. Since making his debut for the club, Moore quickly established himself in the starting eleven, playing in the centre–back position alongside Paul McShane. He then kept four consecutive clean sheets between 22 October 2016 and 19 November 2016 for Reading. Moore started in every match until he was suspended for one match, due to picking up five yellow cards this season so far. Despite this, his impact at Reading was praised by the club's technical director, Brian Tevreden. Moore scored his first goal for Reading against Blackburn Rovers on 17 December 2016. However, during a 0–0 draw against Newcastle United on 7 March 2017, he suffered a hamstring injury in the 50th minute and was substituted as a result. After recovering from a hamstring injury, Moore regained his first team place for the rest of the season and helped Reading reach the playoffs at the end of his first season with them; which his name was mentioned in the BBC Sport article, describing him as playing a "key role". He then played in both legs of the semi–final Championship play–offs against Fulham, as the club won 2–1 on aggregate. In the EFL Championship play-off final against Huddersfield Town, Moore started the whole game, playing 120 minutes, and was two Reading players to miss the shootout, resulting in the opposition team promoted to the Premier League.

Ahead of the 2017–18 season, Moore signed a new four-year contract with Reading on 2 August 2017. At the start of the 2017–18 season, he continued to regain his first team place, playing in the centre–back position alongside Tiago Ilori and McShane. Moore then set up the club's second goal of the game, in a 2–1 win against Aston Villa on 15 August 2017. He then scored his first goal of the season, in a 2–1 loss against Norwich City on 30 September 2017. His performance later earned him Player of the Month for September. It wasn't until on 4 November 2017 when Moore scored his second goal of the season, in a 4–2 win against Derby County. Two weeks later on 21 November 2017, he scored his third goal of the season, in a 2–2 draw against Bolton Wanderers. This was followed up by keeping two consecutive clean sheets against Sheffield Wednesday and Barnsley. His performance attracted interests from clubs that wanted to sign him in the January transfer window but no move was materialised. Throughout the 2017–18 season, Reading struggled that left the team 20th in the league table, just three points of relegation. Despite this, Moore was further awarded three more times, including Player of the Season.

At the start of the 2018–19 season, Moore missed the first two league matches, due to the transfer speculation over his future at Reading. Amid to his future at the club, he made his first appearance of the 2018–19 season, starting the whole game and was given the armband, in a 2–0 win against Birmingham City in the first round of the League Cup. Moore once again captained Reading in his 100th appearance for the side, in a 1–1 draw against Aston Villa on 25 August 2018. It was announced on 31 August 2018 that he signed a contract extension with the club, keeping him until 2023. The day after signing a contract extension with Reading, Moore scored his first goal of the season, in a 2–1 loss against Sheffield Wednesday. Since returning to the first team, he continued to regain his first team place, playing in the centre–back position, as well as, being captain following the injury of McShane. This lasted until Moore suffered a knock that saw him miss four matches. It wasn't until on 26 December 2018 when he returned to the starting line–up as captain, in a 1–0 loss against Millwall. However, his return was short–lived when Moore suffered an injury once again, resulting in missing two matches. But he returned to the starting line–up as captain, in a 2–0 loss against Manchester United in the third round of the FA Cup. Moore then helped Reading keep two consecutive clean sheets, coming against Aston Villa and Sheffield Wednesday between 2 February 2019 and 9 February 2019. Following a 4–0 defeat against Sheffield United on 15 February 2019, he apologised to the club's supporters, who made the trip to Yorkshire. Moore later helped Reading avoid relegation for the second time by finishing 20th place in the league.

Ahead of the 2019–20 season, Moore was named as Reading captain. At the start of the 2019–20 season, he continued to regain his first team place, playing in the centre–back position, as well as, captaining for the club. During a 4–1 loss against Fulham on 1 October 2019, Moore was at fault when his mistimed back pass led to Tom Cairney's goal. After the match, he acknowledged the criticism and vowed to take responsibility as captain. In a follow–up match against Bristol City, Moore played in the centre midfield position, as Reading lost 1–0. However, during a 2–1 win against Millwall on 2 November 2019, which was his 150th appearance for the club, he suffered a shoulder injury that saw him substituted in the 58th minute. But Moore made a quick recovery and returned to the starting line–up, in a 3–0 win against Luton Town on 8 November 2019. He then helped Reading keep four consecutive clean sheets between 14 December 2019 and 29 December 2019. Since the start of the 2019–20 season, Moore started in every match until he missed one match, due to illness and returned on 7 March 2020, coming on as an 81st-minute substitute, in a 3–1 win against Birmingham City. Moore continued as a first-team regular, and by the time the season was suspended because of the COVID-19 pandemic, he had made 36 league appearances. Once the season resumed behind closed doors, Moore remained an integral part of the team despite being dropped to the substitute bench along the way. He then played in the defensive midfield position against Middlesbrough on 14 July 2020 and scored his first goal of the season, in a 2–1 loss.

On 15 January 2022, Moore was stripped of the Club Captaincy after stating his desire to leave the club.

On 31 January 2022, Moore joined Stoke City on loan for the remainder of the 2021–22 season. He made six appearances for Stoke before he suffered a season-ending lateral collateral ligament injury in training.

On 17 May 2023, Reading announced that Moore would leave the club at the end of his contract on 30 June 2023.

=== Northampton Town ===
On 13 February 2024, Moore signed for Northampton Town on a contract until the end of the season. Moore said that it took longer than he expected to find a new club. He was released by the club at the end of the 2023–24 season.

=== Retirement ===
Moore announced his retirement on 25 August 2024 following a series of injuries.

=== Post-retirement ===
In October 2024, Moore announced the foundation of Prime Precision Football Academy alongside fellow footballer Nathan Fox.

On 7 November 2024, Southern League Premier Division Central club Spalding United announced the signing of Moore.

== International career ==
Moore has represented England at under-17, under-20 and under-21 youth international level. He made his England U17 debut, playing 10 minutes, in a 1–1 draw against Italy U17 on 26 August 2009. Moore went on to make three appearances for the U17 side.

On 8 November 2012, he was called up to the England under-21 team for the first time for a friendly against Northern Ireland. He made his debut in the game, coming on as a substitute in the 83rd minute for Jack Robinson. He was recalled to the under-21 squad in November 2013. Moore helped England reach the 2015 UEFA European Under-21 Championship by scoring in the second leg of the play-offs, which England won 2–1 against Croatia. England had already won the first leg 2–1, which meant they progressed to the finals with a 4–2 aggregate win. He went on to make ten appearances and scoring once for the U21 side.

Moore was called up to the England U20 squad for the first time in May 2014 for that summer's Toulon Tournament and European qualifiers. He made his England U20 debut, starting the whole game in the first game of the Toulon Tournament, in a 3–0 win over Qatar. Moore went on to make four appearances for the England U20 side. Moore is eligible to represent Jamaica internationally, through descent.

In March 2021, he was one of six English-born players to receive their first call-up to the Jamaica national team. He made his full international debut in a 4–1 loss to the United States on 25 March 2021.

== Personal life ==
Moore and his wife Roxi have two children.

On 18 April 2018, Moore paid 50 supporters with his own money to help them travel to Hillsborough Stadium prior to away match against Sheffield Wednesday. In the midst of the COVID-19 pandemic, Moore made a statement, urging people to follow "all the messages and advice given by the Government" regarding self-isolation. In May 2020, he was among all the first team players to defer 'substantial' percentage of their salary for the next three months. Moore volunteered delivering personal protective equipment to the Royal Berkshire Hospital, having become an ambassador for UKMaskforce.

== Career statistics ==
=== Club ===
Appearances and goals by club, season and competition
Club	Season	League			FA Cup		League Cup		Other		Total	
Club	Season	Division	Apps	Goals	Apps	Goals	Apps	Goals	Apps	Goals	Apps	Goals
Leicester City	2011–12	Championship	2	0	—		—		—		2	0
Leicester City	2012–13	Championship	16	0	0	0	1	0	0	0	17	0
Leicester City	2013–14	Championship	30	1	0	0	3	0	—		33	1
Leicester City	2014–15	Premier League	11	0	2	0	1	0	—		14	0
Leicester City	2015–16	Premier League	0	0	0	0	1	0	—		1	0
Leicester City	Total		59	1	2	0	6	0	0	0	67	1
Bradford City (loan)	2011–12	League Two	17	0	1	0	1	0	3 (Note: Appearances in Football League Trophy)	0	22	0
Brentford (loan)	2012–13	League One	7	0	—		—		—		7	0
Brentford (loan)	2014–15	Championship	3	0	—		—		—		3	0
Bristol City (loan)	2015–16	Championship	10	0	—		—		—		10	0
Reading	2016–17	Championship	40	1	1	0	3	0	3	0	47	1
Reading	2017–18	Championship	46	3	1	0	2	0	—		49	3
Reading	2018–19	Championship	38	1	1	0	2	0	—		41	1
Reading	2019–20	Championship	43	1	0	0	1	0	—		44	1
Reading	2020–21	Championship	32	0	0	0	1	0	—		33	0
Reading	2021–22	Championship	17	2	—		0	0	—		17	2
Reading	2022–23	Championship	3	0	0	0	0	0	—		3	0
Reading	Total		219	8	3	0	9	0	3	0	233	8
Stoke City (loan)	2021–22	Championship	4	0	2	0	—		—		6	0
Northampton Town	2023–24	League One	8	0	—		—		—		8	0
Career total			327	9	8	0	16	0	6	0	357	9

=== International ===
Appearances and goals by national team and year
National team	Year	Apps	Goals
Jamaica	2021	9	0
Total		9	0

== Honours ==
Leicester City

- Football League Championship: 2013–14

Individual

- Football League Young Player of the Month: September 2013
