= 2018–19 Reading F.C. season =

Reading
2018–19 season
- Manager: Paul Clement (until 6 December); Scott Marshall (caretaker, 6–22 December); José Gomes (from 22 December 2018)
- Stadium: Madejski Stadium
- Championship: 20th
- FA Cup: Third round (vs. Manchester United)
- EFL Cup: Second round (vs. Watford)
- Top goalscorer: League: Yakou Méïté (12); All: Yakou Méïté (13)
- Highest home attendance: 17,255 vs West Bromwich Albion (22 April 2019)
- Lowest home attendance: 11,271 vs Blackburn Rovers (13 February 2019)
- Average home league attendance: 14,991
Home colours	Away colours

The 2018–19 season was Reading's 148th year in existence and sixth consecutive season in the Championship, and covers the period from 1 July 2018 to 30 June 2019.

== Season review ==
=== Pre-season ===
On 18 May 2018, Reading announced that they would be taking part in a six-day pre-season training camp in Bad Erlach, Austria, with two friendlies scheduled to be played against as yet un-confirmed opposition. The EFL Cup first round draw took place on 15 June 2018, in Vietnam, drawing Reading at home against Birmingham City.

==== Transfers and contracts ====
Reading announced their first summer signing on 17 May 2018, Andy Yiadom signed a four-year contract with Reading, officially joining his new club on 1 July after the expiration of his Barnsley contract. Reading's second summer signing was announced on 5 June, with David Meyler signing a two-year contract, with the option of an additional year, on a free transfer from Hull City upon the conclusion of contract with them on 30 June. The following day, Reading announced that John O'Shea had signed a one-year contract to commence on 1 July 2018.

On 20 June, Reading announced that Andrija Novakovich had signed a new two-year contract with the club, and that he would spend the next season on loan at Eredivisie club Fortuna Sittard. Two days after, it was announced that goalkeeper Lewis Ward had also extended his contract with the club until the summer of 2020. On 2 July, Reading announced that youngsters Jamal Balogun, Andre Burley, Cameron Green, Adam Liddle, Akin Odimayo, Moroyin Omolabi and Jazz Wallace had all signed their first professional contracts with the club, whilst goalkeeper Luke Southwood had also signed a new two-year contract.

On 3 July, Reading announced that Ethan Bristow, Jeriel Dorsett, Josh Hewitt, Morgan Kealy, Conor Lawless, Kian Leavy, Jordan Murray, Thierry Nevers, Michael Olise, Oliver Pendlebury, Myles Roberts and Fabio Sole had all been inducted into their Under-18 squad on two-year scholarship deals.

Reading signed Marc McNulty from Coventry City, on 6 July, to a four-year contract for an undisclosed fee. Two days later, it was announced that Danzell Gravenberch had re-joined KSV Roeselare on loan for second successive season.

On 10 July, Reading parted company with striker Yann Kermorgant by mutual agreement and Tennai Watson joined AFC Wimbledon on a season-long loan deal. Reading announced that they had signed Darren Sidoel from Ajax on a three-year contract on 17 July.

Academy graduate Jökull Andrésson agreed a two-year contract with Reading on 24 July, before joining Hungerford Town on loan until 1 January 2019. The following day, Joey van den Berg moved to NEC on a season-long loan deal, whilst Colchester United goalkeeper Sam Walker joined the club on a three-year deal. On 27 July, Lewis Ward joined Northampton Town on a season-long loan.

Sam Baldock signed a three-year contract with Reading, joining from Brighton and Hove Albion on 30 July. The following day, Reading confirmed that George Evans had moved to Derby County for an undisclosed fee and Sam Smith joined Oxford United on a season-long loan.

==== Matches ====
On 30 June, Reading played their first pre-season fixture away at Eastleigh. The Royals lost the fixture 2–1, with the National League side scoring a late winner through Ben Williamson. Prior to this, Paul McCallum had put the hosts ahead in the first half, before Leandro Bacuna's equaliser. Reading played two different teams composed of first team players in either half.

On 7 July, Reading faced League One outfit AFC Wimbledon at Kingsmeadow. Former-Royals loanee Kwesi Appiah put the hosts ahead, before Joe Pigott doubled their advantage just before the break. Adrian Popa and Sam Smith levelled the game with two goals in five minutes following the restart. Egli Kaja restored Wimbledon's lead, with Kane Crichlow wrapping up a 4–2 victory for the Dons with six minutes to play. As with the Eastleigh fixture, Reading fielded separate teams in either half. A 0–0 draw with Premier League Fulham followed a week later at the Recreation Ground in Aldershot. Twenty-one different players featured for Reading.

As part of the club's training camp in Bad Erlach, Austria, the Royals faced Turkish giants Beşiktaş in Graz, as part of the Turks' preparation for their Europa League campaign. Ryan Babel and Oğuzhan Özyakup put Beşiktaş into a two-goal lead in the second half, before Sam Smith and Marc McNulty levelled the contest in the final ten minutes. On the 20 July, Reading faced former Russian champions Rubin Kazan in Ilz with the sides playing out a 0–0 draw.

On 28 July, Reading played their only home match of pre-season with the visit of Crystal Palace. The Premier League side won 4–0, with goals from Alexander Sørloth, Wilfried Zaha (two) and James Tomkins, rounding of a winless pre-season for Reading.

=== August ===
Reading opened the season with a 2–1 home defeat against Derby County on 3 August. Reading opened the scoring in the 52nd minute through Jón Daði Böðvarsson, before Mason Mount equalised in the 60th minute and Tom Lawrence scored a last minute header to seal the victory for Derby County. Reading's second game of the season saw them travel to Nottingham Forest on 11 August. A single Hillal Soudani goal in the 68th minute saw the host emerge victorious, and Reading dropping to the foot of the table. On 14 August Reading hosted Birmingham City in the First Round of the EFL Cup, with goals from Yakou Méïté and John Swift securing Reading's first win of the season and their place in the Second Round of the League Cup.

On 15 August, Axel Andrésson signed a new contract with Reading until the summer of 2020, and then immediately joined Norwegian OBOS-ligaen club Viking FK on loan until the end of their season.

On 17 August, goalkeeper Liam Driscoll joined Hungerford Town on an emergency loan after Jökull Andrésson was ruled out for a couple of week due to injury in a prior game.

On 20 August, Reading announced the signing of winger Josh Sims on a season-long loan deal from Southampton.

On 31 August, Reading announced that Saeid Ezatolahi had joined the club on a season-long loan deal from Rostov, and that Liam Moore had signed a new five-year contract, keeping him at Reading until the summer of 2023.

=== September ===
A 2–1 defeat to Sheffield Wednesday on 1 September means Reading suffer their most winless season in their 147-year history despite Liam Moore's late header in the 78th minute.

On 7 September, goalkeeper George Legg joined Aldershot Town on a one-month loan deal.

On 12 September, Reading confirmed that Brian Tevreden had left the club to become Chief Executive at K.S.V. Roeselare, with Gianluca Nani taking over as Sporting Director.

=== October ===
On 3 October, Reading announced that Yakou Méïte had signed a new contract with Reading, until the summer of 2022.

On 5 October 2018, Gabriel Osho joined Aldershot Town on loan until 4 November 2018, whilst Ade Shokunbi joined Billericay Town until January 2019.

=== November ===
On 7 November, Gabriel Osho had his loan with Aldershot Town extended until the New Year, with Josh Barrett joining Osho at Aldershot Town on 10 November, signing an initial one-month loan deal On 16 November, George Legg joined Braintree Town on a month-long loan deal, whilst Adam Liddle and Joel Rollinson signed youth loan moves with Eastbourne Borough until 16 December.

On 19 November, Ron Gourlay left his role as CEO of Reading with immediate effect.

=== December ===
On 3 December, Reading were drawn away to Manchester United by Ruud Gullit and Paul Ince.

Paul Clement was sacked as manager on 6 December, with U23 manager Scott Marshall taking temporary charge of the first team, and Gabriel Osho being recalled early from his loan deal with Aldershot Town. The following day, 7 December, Gianluca Nani left the club by mutual consent less than three months after joining Reading.

On 16 December, young midfielder Tyler Frost joined Havant & Waterlooville on a month-long loan deal. On 20 December, Reading announced that Adrian Popa had moved to Ludogorets Razgrad on loan for the rest of the season, with Axel Andrésson moving to Viking FK on permanent deal the following day.

On 21 December, Wealdstone announced the signing of Ramarni Medford-Smith on loan for one-month.

Following Reading's 1–0 home defeat to Middlesbrough on 22 December, Reading announced the appointment of José Gomes as their new manager.

On 24 December, goalkeeper Luke Southwood joined Eastleigh on a one-month loan deal.

=== January ===
==== Transfers ====
On 29 December 2018, Oxford United announced that Sam Smith would return to Reading earl from his loan deal, after they'd activated a clause in the contract. On 3 January 2019, Pelle Clement left the club to join Eredivisie club PEC Zwolle, who were managed by Ex-Reading manager Jaap Stam. The following day Ben House joined Swindon Town on loan until the end of the season, whilst Darren Sidoel joined K.S.V. Roeselare on loan until the end if the season.

On 7 January, Reading announced that David Edwards had left the club to re-join Shrewsbury Town, whilst Josh Sims' loan deal had been ended early and he'd returned to Southampton, and Ovie Ejaria joined on loan until the end of the season from Liverpool.

On 9 January, Lewis Baker joined Reading on loan for the remainder of the season from Chelsea.

On 14 January, Reading announced that Lewis Ward's loan with Northampton Town had ended early, and that he would join Forest Green Rovers on loan for the remainder of the season. On 18 January, Reading announced that George Legg had joined Boreham Wood on loan until the end of the season, Sam Smith had joined Shrewsbury Town until the end of the season, and Tyler Frost and Ramarni Medford-Smith had extended their loans with Havant & Waterlooville and Wealdstone respectively for an additional month. On 22 January, Reading announced the singing of Nélson Oliveira on loan from Norwich City until the end of the season. The next day, 23 January, Emiliano Martínez joined on loan from Arsenal for the remainder of the season. On 24 January, Luke Southwood extended his loan deal with Eastleigh until the end of the season. The following day Matt Miazga became the second Chelsea players to join Reading on loan for the rest of the season. On 29 January, Gabriel Osho joined Bristol Rovers on loan for the remainder of the season, whilst Tiago Ilori moved permanently to Sporting CP for an undisclosed fee. On 31 January, transfer deadline day, Leandro Bacuna left the club for Cardiff City on an undisclosed fee, and David Meyler and Marc McNulty left the club on loan for the remainder of the season, joining Coventry City and Hibernian respectively.

=== February ===
On 6 February, Salisbury announced that Liam Driscoll had joined them on loan, replacing follow Reading youth keeper James Hillson who'd moved to Arsenal on loan. On 10 February, Vito Mannone joined Minnesota United on loan terms which run until 1 January 2020.

On 25 February, Andy Rinomhota signed a new contract with Reading, lasting until the summer of 2022. The following day, Tom McIntyre, Teddy Howe and Jordan Holsgrove extended their contracts until the summer of 2021, Tom Holmes signed a new contract until the summer of 2022, and Sone Aluko moved to Beijing Renhe on loan until the end of the 2019 season.

=== March ===
On 12 March, Ryan East signed a new contract, until the summer of 2021, and made his first team debut against Leeds United.

=== April ===
On 17 April, Reading announced that Macron would be the team's new kit supplier for three seasons beginning at the start of the 2019–20 season.

=== May ===
On 10 May Reading announced that they had offered new contracts to Tyler Frost, Adam Liddle, Ramarni Medford-Smith, Adam Desbois, Marcel Elva-Fountaine and Roberto Nditi and a first professional deal to Imari Samuels. Reading also confirmed that first team members George Legg, Anssi Jaakkola, Paul McShane, Danzell Gravenberch, Callum Harriott and Joey van den Berg would all leave the club following the completion of their contracts at the end of June, with John O'Shea retiring from football. Also leaving the club would be youngsters Jamal Balogun, Cameron Green, Moroyin Omolabi, Joel Rollinson, Ademola Shokunbi, Jazz Wallace, Jacob Pemberton, James Hillson. Shamar Moore, Terrance Saydee, Khalid Simmo and Thomas Stevens.

On 27 May 2019, Michael Olise was called up to the France at the 2019 Toulon Tournament, whilst the following day Danny Loader was called up to represent England, and Josh Barrett to represent Republic of Ireland.

On 28 May, youth team goalkeeper Coniah Boyce-Clarke agreed to sign a professional contract which Reading, until the summer of 2023, to commence the summer after his 17th birthday. On the same day, Claudio Osorio, Nelson Abbey and Malachi Talent-Aryeetey agreed to sign professional terms with the club once they turn 17.

== Transfers ==
=== In ===
Date	Position	Nationality	Name	From	Fee	Ref.
17 May 2018 (Note: The transfers of Yiadom, Meyler & O'Shea were announced prior to the completion of the transfer. The players officially joined the club on 1 July 2018.)	DF	(Ghana)	Andy Yiadom	Barnsley	Free	
5 June 2018	MF	(Republic of Ireland)	David Meyler	Hull City	Free	
6 June 2018	DF	(Republic of Ireland)	John O'Shea	Sunderland	Free	
6 July 2018	FW	(Scotland)	Marc McNulty	Coventry City	Undisclosed	
17 July 2018	DF	(Netherlands)	Darren Sidoel	Ajax	Undisclosed	
25 July 2018	GK	(England)	Sam Walker	Colchester United	Free	
30 July 2018	FW	(England)	Sam Baldock	Brighton & Hove Albion	Undisclosed	

=== Loans in ===
Start date	Position	Nationality	Name	From	End date	Ref.
20 August 2018	MF	(England)	Josh Sims	Southampton	7 January 2019	
31 August 2018	MF	(Iran)	Saeid Ezatolahi	Rostov	End of Season	
7 January 2019	MF	(England)	Ovie Ejaria	Liverpool	End of Season	
9 January 2019	MF	(England)	Lewis Baker	Chelsea	End of Season	
22 January 2019	FW	(Portugal)	Nélson Oliveira	Norwich City	End of Season	
23 January 2019	GK	(Argentina)	Emiliano Martínez	Arsenal	End of Season	
25 January 2019	DF	(United States)	Matt Miazga	Chelsea	End of Season	

=== Out ===
Date	Position	Nationality	Name	To	Fee	Ref.
31 July 2018	MF	(England)	George Evans	Derby County	Undisclosed	
21 December 2018	DF	(Iceland)	Axel Andrésson	Viking	Undisclosed	
3 January 2019	MF	(Netherlands)	Pelle Clement	PEC Zwolle	Undisclosed	
29 January 2019	DF	(Portugal)	Tiago Ilori	Sporting CP	Undisclosed	
31 January 2019	MF	(Curaçao)	Leandro Bacuna	Cardiff City	Undisclosed	

=== Loans out ===
Start date	Position	Nationality	Name	To	End date	Ref.
20 June 2018	FW	(United States)	Andrija Novakovich	Fortuna Sittard	31 May 2019	
9 July 2018	DF	(Netherlands)	Danzell Gravenberch	KSV Roeselare	31 May 2019	
10 July 2018	DF	(England)	Tennai Watson	AFC Wimbledon	31 May 2019	
24 July 2018	GK	(Iceland)	Jökull Andrésson	Hungerford Town	1 January 2019	
25 July 2018	MF	(Netherlands)	Joey van den Berg	NEC	31 May 2019	
27 July 2018	GK	(England)	Lewis Ward	Northampton Town	14 January 2019	
31 July 2018	FW	(England)	Sam Smith	Oxford United	1 January 2019	
15 August 2018	DF	(Iceland)	Axel Andrésson	Viking	11 November 2018	
17 August 2018	GK	(Australia)	Liam Driscoll	Hungerford Town		
7 September 2018	GK	(England)	George Legg	Aldershot Town	October 2018	
5 October 2018	DF	(England)	Gabriel Osho	Aldershot Town	6 December 2018	
5 October 2018	MF	(England)	Ade Shokunbi	Billericay Town	January 2019	
19 October 2018	GK	(England)	James Hillson	Salisbury	6 February 2019	
10 November 2018	MF	(Republic of Ireland)	Josh Barrett	Aldershot Town	December 2018	
16 November 2018	GK	(England)	George Legg	Braintree Town	16 December 2018	
16 November 2018	MF	(Australia)	Joel Rollinson	Eastbourne Borough	16 December 2018	
16 November 2018	FW	(England)	Adam Liddle	Eastbourne Borough	16 December 2018	
16 December 2018	MF	(England)	Tyler Frost	Havant & Waterlooville	16 February 2019	
21 December 2018	DF	(England)	Ramarni Medford-Smith	Wealdstone	16 February 2019	
20 December 2018	MF	(Romania)	Adrian Popa	Ludogorets Razgrad	End of the Season	
24 December 2018	GK	(England)	Luke Southwood	Eastleigh	End of Season	
4 January 2019	FW	(Scotland)	Ben House	Swindon Town	End of Season	
4 January 2019	DF	(Netherlands)	Darren Sidoel	KSV Roeselare	31 May 2019	
14 January 2019	GK	(England)	Lewis Ward	Forest Green Rovers	End of Season	
18 January 2019	GK	(England)	George Legg	Boreham Wood	End of Season	
18 January 2019	FW	(England)	Sam Smith	Shrewsbury Town	End of Season	
29 January 2019	DF	(England)	Gabriel Osho	Bristol Rovers	End of Season	
31 January 2019	MF	(Republic of Ireland)	David Meyler	Coventry City	End of Season	
31 January 2019	FW	(Scotland)	Marc McNulty	Hibernian	End of Season	
6 February 2019	GK	(England)	James Hillson	Arsenal	End of Season	
6 February 2019	GK	(Australia)	Liam Driscoll	Salisbury	End of Season	
10 February 2019	GK	(Italy)	Vito Mannone	Minnesota United	1 January 2020	
26 February 2019	FW	(Nigeria)	Sone Aluko	Beijing Renhe	1 January 2020	

=== Released ===
Date	Position	Nationality	Name	Joined	Date	Ref
10 July 2018	FW	(France)	Yann Kermorgant	Vannes	2 October 2018	
31 December 2018	MF	(England)	Jordan Murray	AFC Bournemouth	1 January 2019	
7 January 2019	MF	(Wales)	David Edwards	Shrewsbury Town	7 January 2019	
30 June 2019	GK	(England)	James Hillson	Arsenal	2 July 2019	
30 June 2019	GK	(England)	George Legg	Thatcham Town	9 September 2020	
30 June 2019	GK	(Finland)	Anssi Jaakkola	Bristol Rovers	1 July 2019	
30 June 2019	DF	(England)	Jamal Balogun	Watford	12 July 2019	
30 June 2019	DF	(England)	Jacob Pemberton	Loughborough University		
30 June 2019	DF	(Republic of Ireland)	John O'Shea	Retired		
30 June 2019	DF	(Republic of Ireland)	Paul McShane	Rochdale	10 October 2019	
30 June 2019	DF	(Netherlands)	Danzell Gravenberch	TOP Oss		
30 June 2019	MF	(Australia)	Joel Rollinson	Stevenage	5 August 2019	
30 June 2019	MF	(England)	Samuel Faniyan	Hertford Town		
30 June 2019	MF	(England)	Cameron Green	Watford	12 July 2019	
30 June 2019	MF	(England)	Moroyin Omolabi	Berkhamsted		
30 June 2019	MF	(England)	Terrance Saydee	Staines Town		
30 June 2019	MF	(England)	Ademola Shokunbi	Beaconsfield Town		
30 June 2019	MF	(England)	Khalid Simmo	Flackwell Heath		
30 June 2019	MF	(England)	Jazz Wallace	Thatcham Town	26 February 2022	
30 June 2019	MF	(Guyana)	Callum Harriott	Colchester United	7 September 2019	
30 June 2019	MF	(Netherlands)	Joey van den Berg	NEC		
30 June 2019	FW	(England)	Shamar Moore	Cardiff City		
30 June 2019	FW	(England)	Thomas Stevens	Kasem Bundit University		

== Squad ==
As of match played 5 May 2019

No.	Name	Nationality	Position	Date of birth (Age (Note: Age as of the end of the season))	Signed from	Signed in	Contract ends	Apps.	Goals
Goalkeepers
26	Emiliano Martínez	(Argentina)	GK	2 September 1992 (aged 26)	loan from Arsenal	2019	2019	18	0
28	Sam Walker	(England)	GK	2 October 1991 (aged 27)	Colchester United	2018	2021	9	0
31	Anssi Jaakkola	(Finland)	GK	13 March 1987 (aged 32)	Ajax Cape Town	2016	2019	30	0
34	Lewis Ward	(England)	GK	5 March 1997 (aged 22)	Academy	2015	2020	0	0
40	George Legg	(England)	GK	30 April 1996 (aged 23)	Academy	2015		0	0
	Jökull Andrésson	(Iceland)	GK	25 August 2001 (aged 17)	Academy	2018	2020	0	0
	Liam Driscoll	(Australia)	GK	8 May 1999 (aged 19)	Academy	2017	2020	0	0
Defenders
2	Chris Gunter	(Wales)	DF	21 July 1989 (aged 29)	Nottingham Forest	2012	2020	294	4
3	Andy Yiadom (Note: Andy Yiadom was born in Holloway, England, but qualified to represent Ghana and made his international debut for Ghana in January 2017. He previously represented England at C level.)	(Ghana)	DF	2 December 1991 (aged 27)	Barnsley	2018	2022	47	1
4	John O'Shea	(Republic of Ireland)	DF	30 April 1981 (aged 38)	Sunderland	2018	2019	11	0
5	Paul McShane	(Republic of Ireland)	DF	6 January 1986 (aged 33)	Hull City	2015	2019	103	4
6	Liam Moore (Note: Liam Moore was born in Loughborough, England, but qualified to represent Jamaica, and made his international debut for Jamaica in March 2021.)	(England)	DF	31 January 1993 (aged 26)	Leicester City	2016	2023	137	5
11	Jordan Obita (Note: Obita was born in Oxford, England, but qualified to represent Uganda and made his international debut for Uganda in June 2025.)	(England)	DF	8 December 1993 (aged 25)	Academy	2010	2020	165	4
19	Matt Miazga	(United States)	DF	19 July 1995 (aged 23)	loan from Chelsea	2019	2019	18	0
24	Tyler Blackett	(England)	DF	2 April 1994 (aged 25)	Manchester United	2016	2020	100	0
27	Omar Richards	(England)	DF	15 February 1998 (aged 21)	Academy	2016	2021	28	2
30	Tennai Watson	(England)	DF	4 March 1997 (aged 22)	Academy	2015	2021	7	0
44	Tom Holmes	(England)	DF	12 March 2000 (aged 19)	Academy	2017	2022	1	0
46	Tom McIntyre (Note: Tom McIntyre was born in Reading, England, but qualified to represent Scotland, representing them at U17, U20 and U21 level.)	(Scotland)	DF	6 November 1998 (aged 20)	Academy	2016	2021	2	0
47	Gabriel Osho (Note: Osho was born in Reading, England, but qualified to represent Nigeria and made his international debut for Nigeria in November 2024.)	(England)	DF	14 August 1997 (aged 21)	Academy	2016	2020	2	0
49	Teddy Howe	(England)	DF	9 October 1998 (aged 20)	Academy	2017	2021	1	0
	Ramarni Medford-Smith	(England)	DF	21 October 1998 (aged 20)	Academy	2017		0	0
Midfielders
8	David Meyler	(Republic of Ireland)	MF	29 May 1989 (aged 29)	Hull City	2018	2020	5	0
10	John Swift	(England)	MF	23 June 1995 (aged 23)	Chelsea	2016	2022	105	16
12	Garath McCleary (Note: Garath McCleary was born in Oxford, England, but qualified to represent Jamaica and made his international debut for Jamaica in February 2013.)	(Jamaica)	MF	15 May 1987 (aged 31)	Nottingham Forest	2012	2020	246	26
15	Callum Harriott (Note: Callum Harriott was born in Norbury, England, but qualified to represent Guyana, making his international debut for Guyana in March 2019.)	(Guyana)	MF	4 March 1994 (aged 25)	Charlton Athletic	2016	2019	29	4
16	Lewis Baker	(England)	MF	25 April 1995 (aged 24)	loan from Chelsea	2019	2019	19	1
18	Ovie Ejaria	(England)	MF	18 November 1997 (aged 21)	loan from Liverpool	2019	2019	16	1
32	Saeid Ezatolahi	(Iran)	MF	1 October 1996 (aged 22)	loan from Rostov	2018	2019	4	0
35	Andy Rinomhota (Note: Rinomhota was born in Leeds, England, but qualified to represent Zimbabwe and made his international debut for Zimbabwe in November 2023.)	(England)	MF	21 April 1997 (aged 22)	Academy	2017	2022	30	1
38	Liam Kelly (Note: Liam Kelly was born in Basingstoke, England, but qualified to represent the Republic of Ireland through his parents, representing the Republic of Ireland at U19 and U21 level.)	(Republic of Ireland)	MF	22 November 1995 (aged 23)	Academy	2014	2020	94	9
39	Josh Barrett (Note: Jost Barrett was born in Oxford, England, but qualified to represent the Republic of Ireland, representing the Republic of Ireland at U16, U17, U19 and U21 level.)	(Republic of Ireland)	MF	21 June 1998 (aged 20)	Academy	2015	2021	6	0
42	Ryan East	(England)	MF	7 August 1998 (aged 20)	Academy	2016	2021	1	0
48	Michael Olise (Note: Michael Olise qualifies to represent England, Nigeria and France, making his international debut for France U18 in June 2019 at the 2019 Toulon Tournament.)	(France)	MF	12 December 2001 (aged 17)	Academy	2018	2020	4	0
51	Tyler Frost	(England)	MF	7 August 1999 (aged 19)	Academy	2017		0	0
52	Joel Rollinson	(Australia)	MF	16 November 1998 (aged 20)	Academy	2017		0	0
54	Ade Shokunbi	(England)	MF	17 December 1998 (aged 20)	Academy	2017		0	0
58	Jordan Holsgrove	(Scotland)	MF	10 September 1999 (aged 19)	Academy	2017	2021	0	0
Forwards
9	Sam Baldock	(England)	FW	15 March 1989 (aged 30)	Brighton & Hove Albion	2018	2021	23	5
17	Modou Barrow	(The Gambia)	FW	13 October 1992 (aged 26)	Swansea City	2017	2021	82	14
21	Yakou Méïté (Note: Yakou Méïte was born in Paris, France, but qualified to represent the Ivory Coast, representing the Ivory Coast at U17, U20 and U23 level.)	(Ivory Coast)	FW	11 February 1996 (aged 23)	Paris Saint-Germain	2016	2022	55	14
22	Nélson Oliveira	(Portugal)	FW	8 August 1991 (aged 27)	loan from Norwich City	2019	2019	10	3
23	Jón Daði Böðvarsson	(Iceland)	FW	25 May 1992 (aged 26)	Wolverhampton Wanderers	2017	2020	56	16
43	Danny Loader (Note: Loader was born in Reading, England, but qualified to represent Cameroon, and made his international debut for Cameroon in March 2025 having previously represented England various youth level.)	(England)	FW	28 August 2000 (aged 18)	Academy	2016		23	1
45	Ben House (Note: House was born in Guildford, England, but qualified to represent Scotland, and made his debut for Scotland U20 in March 2019.)	(Scotland)	FW	5 July 1999 (aged 19)	Academy	2017	2020	0	0
	Sam Smith	(England)	FW	8 March 1998 (aged 21)	Academy	2016	2021	12	2
Academy
	Morgan Kealy	(England)	GK	16 January 2003 (aged 16)	Academy	2018	2020	0	0
	Myles Roberts	(England)	GK	9 December 2001 (aged 17)	Academy	2018	2020	0	0
	Ethan Bristow (Note: Ethan Bristow was born in England, but qualified to represent Saint Kitts and Nevis, and made his international debut for Saint Kitts and Nevis in November 2023.)	(England)	DF	27 November 2001 (aged 17)	Academy	2018	2020	0	0
	Jeriel Dorsett (Note: Jeriel Dorsett was born in Enfield, England, but qualified to represent Montserrat and made his international debut for Montserrat in September 2023. He previously represented England at U18 level.)	(England)	DF	4 May 2002 (aged 17)	Academy	2018	2020	0	0
	Josh Hewitt	(England)	DF	19 September 2001 (aged 17)	Academy	2018	2020	0	0
	Conor Lawless	(England)	MF	13 September 2001 (aged 17)	Academy	2018	2020	0	0
	Oliver Pendlebury	(England)	MF	19 January 2002 (aged 17)	Academy	2018	2020	0	0
	Fabio Sole	(England)	MF	6 September 2001 (aged 17)	Academy	2018	2020	0	0
	Kian Leavy	(Republic of Ireland)	MF	21 March 2002 (aged 17)	Academy	2018	2020	0	0
	Thierry Nevers	(England)	FW	5 February 2001 (aged 18)	Academy	2018	2020	0	0
Out on loan
1	Vito Mannone	(Italy)	GK	2 March 1988 (aged 31)	Sunderland	2017	2020	47	0
14	Sone Aluko (Note: Sone Aluko was born in Hounslow, England, but qualified to represent Nigeria and made his international debut for Nigeria in May 2009. He previously represented Nigeria at U20 and U23 level and England at U16, U17, U18 and U19 level.)	(Nigeria)	FW	19 February 1989 (aged 30)	Fulham	2017	2021	60	4
25	Adrian Popa	(Romania)	MF	24 July 1988 (aged 30)	Steaua București	2017	2020	17	1
28	Danzell Gravenberch	(Netherlands)	DF	13 February 1994 (aged 25)	Dordrecht	2016	2019	5	0
29	Marc McNulty	(Scotland)	FW	14 September 1992 (aged 26)	Coventry City	2018	2022	15	1
36	Andrija Novakovich	(United States)	FW	21 September 1996 (aged 22)	University School of Milwaukee	2014	2020	2	0
	Luke Southwood (Note: Luke Southwood was born in Oxford, England, representing England at U20 level before going on to make his international debut for Northern Ireland in March 2022.)	(England)	GK	6 December 1997 (aged 21)	Academy	2016	2020	0	0
	Darren Sidoel	(Netherlands)	DF	10 March 1998 (aged 21)	Ajax	2018	2021	0	0
	Joey van den Berg	(Netherlands)	MF	13 February 1986 (aged 33)	SC Heerenveen	2016	2019	68	2
Left during the season
7	Leandro Bacuna (Note: Leandro Bacuna was born in Groningen, Netherlands, but qualified to represent Curaçao and made his international debut for Curaçao in March 2016. He previously represented Netherlands Antilles at U20 level and Netherlands at U19 and U21 level.)	(Curaçao)	MF	21 August 1991 (aged 27)	Aston Villa	2017	2021	66	5
16	David Edwards (Note: David Edwards was born in Pontesbury, England, but qualified to represent Wales and made his international debut for Nigeria in November 2007. He previously represented Wales at U21 level.)	(Wales)	MF	3 February 1986 (aged 33)	Wolverhampton Wanderers	2017	2019	35	3
18	Yann Kermorgant	(France)	FW	8 November 1981 (aged 37)	Bournemouth	2016	2019	92	24
19	Josh Sims	(England)	MF	28 March 1997 (aged 22)	loan from Southampton	2018	2019	16	0
20	Tiago Ilori (Note: Tiago Ilori was born in Hampstead, England, but qualified to represent Portugal through his mother, representing Portugal at U18, U19, U20, U21 and U23 level.)	(Portugal)	DF	26 February 1993 (aged 26)	Liverpool	2017	2020	64	1
22	Pelle Clement	(Netherlands)	MF	19 May 1996 (aged 22)	AFC Ajax	2017	2020	29	0
26	George Evans	(England)	CM	13 December 1994 (aged 24)	Manchester City	2016	2019	72	4
37	Axel Andrésson	(Iceland)	DF	27 January 1998 (aged 21)	Academy	2016	2020	2	0
	Jordan Murray	(England)	MF		Academy	2018	2020	0	0

== Friendlies ==
30 June 2018 Friendly	Eastleigh	2–1	Reading	Eastleigh
12:30 BST	McCallum 14'; Williamson 86'	Report	Bacuna 78'	Stadium: Silverlake Stadium; Attendance: 738

7 July 2018 Friendly	AFC Wimbledon	4–2	Reading	Kingston upon Thames
12:00 BST	Appiah 36'; Pigott 42'; Kaja 74'; K.Critchlow 84'	Report	Popa 51'; Smith 56'	Stadium: Kingsmeadow

14 July 2018 Friendly	Fulham	0–0	Reading	Aldershot
13:30 BST		Report		Stadium: Recreation Ground

17 July 2018 Friendly	Beşiktaş	2–2	Reading	Graz, Austria
18:00 BST	Babel 60'; Özyakup 75'	Report	Smith 84'; McNulty 90'	Stadium: Sportzentrum Graz-Weinzödl

20 July 2018 Friendly	Rubin Kazan	0–0	Reading	Ilz, Austria
16:00 BST		Report

28 July 2018 Friendly	Reading	0–4	Crystal Palace	Reading
15:00 BST		Report	Sørloth 33'; Zaha 48', 64'; Tomkins 69'	Stadium: Madejski Stadium

== Competitions ==
=== Championship ===
==== League table ====
Pos	Team	Pld	W	D	L	GF	GA	GD	Pts	Promotion, qualification or relegation
17	Birmingham City	46	14	19	13	64	58	+6	52 (Note: Birmingham City were deducted 9 points for failure to comply with the EFL profitability and sustainability rules.)	
18	Wigan Athletic	46	13	13	20	51	64	−13	52	
19	Queens Park Rangers	46	14	9	23	53	71	−18	51	
20	Reading	46	10	17	19	49	66	−17	47	
21	Millwall	46	10	14	22	48	64	−16	44	
22	Rotherham United (R)	46	8	16	22	52	83	−31	40	Relegation to EFL League One
23	Bolton Wanderers (R)	46	8	8	30	29	78	−49	32 (Note: Brentford were awarded a 1–0 win over Bolton due to Bolton's inability to hold the fixture.)	Relegation to EFL League One

Source: Sky Sports Archived 25 September 2019 at the Wayback Machine
Rules for classification: 1) Points; 2) Goal difference; 3) Number of goals scored; 4) Head-to-head results
(R) Relegated

==== Result summary ====
Overall								Home						Away					
Pld	W	D	L	GF	GA	GD	Pts	W	D	L	GF	GA	GD	W	D	L	GF	GA	GD
46	10	17	19	49	66	−17	47	8	6	9	29	31	−2	2	11	10	20	35	−15

Last updated: 5 May 2019.
Source: Results

==== Results by matchday ====
Round	1	2	3	4	5	6	7	8	9	10	11	12	13	14	15	16	17	18	19	20	21	22	23	24	25	26	27	28	29	30	31	32	33	34	35	36	37	38	39	40	41	42	43	44	45	46
Ground	H	A	H	A	A	H	A	H	H	A	H	A	H	A	A	H	H	A	A	H	H	A	H	A	A	H	H	A	A	H	A	H	A	H	A	H	H	A	H	A	A	H	A	H	A	H
Result	L	L	L	D	D	L	W	L	W	D	L	L	W	L	L	W	D	D	L	D	L	D	L	L	D	L	W	L	D	D	D	W	L	D	W	W	L	D	W	L	D	W	D	D	L	D
Position	19	24	23	23	23	24	22	22	20	20	20	21	19	21	22	22	20	21	20	21	22	21	21	23	23	23	22	22	22	22	22	21	21	21	21	19	20	21	19	21	20	19	19	20	20	20

Updated to match(es) played on 5 May 2019. Source: https://www.11v11.com/teams/reading/tab/leagueTables/1-january-2019/
A = Away; H = Home; W = Win; D = Draw; L = Loss

==== Results ====
3 August 2018 1	Reading	1–2	Derby County	Reading
20:00 BST (UTC+1)	Meyler (yellow card) 37'; Kelly (yellow card) 38'; Böðvarsson 52'; Méïte (yellow card) 88'	Report	Wisdom (yellow card) 22'; Bryson (yellow card) 43'; Lowe (yellow card) 46'; Mount 60'; Johnson (yellow card) 88'; Lawrence 90+4'	Stadium: Madejski Stadium; Attendance: 16,923; Referee: Robert Jones

11 August 2018 2	Nottingham Forest	1–0	Reading	West Bridgford
15:00 BST (UTC+1)	Soudani 68'	Report	Barrow (yellow card) 80'	Stadium: City Ground; Attendance: 27,948; Referee: Steve Martin

18 August 2018 3	Reading	0–1	Bolton Wanderers	Reading
15:00 BST (UTC+1)	Blackett (yellow card) 25'; Kelly (yellow card) 65'	Report	Wheater (yellow card) 11'; Wildschut 48'	Stadium: Madejski Stadium; Attendance: 13,318; Referee: James Linington

22 August 2018 4	Blackburn Rovers	2–2	Reading	Blackburn
19:45 BST (UTC+1)	Mulgrew 51' (pen.), 76' (pen.); Evans (yellow card) 86'	Report	Böðvarsson 12', 25'	Stadium: Ewood Park; Attendance: 11,818; Referee: Oliver Langford

26 August 2018 5	Aston Villa	1–1	Reading	Birmingham
15:00 BST (UTC+1)	Elmohamady 51'	Report	Méïte (yellow card) 58'; Sims (yellow card) 70'; Baldock 90+3' (pen.)	Stadium: Villa Park; Attendance: 33,405; Referee: Darren England

1 September 2018 6	Reading	1–2	Sheffield Wednesday	Reading
15:00 BST (UTC+1)	Moore 64'; Sims (yellow card) 87'	Report	Reach 12'; Penney (yellow card) 19'; João 46'	Stadium: Madejski Stadium; Attendance: 14,352; Referee: Gavin Ward

15 September 2018 7	Preston North End	2–3	Reading	Preston
15:00 BST (UTC+1)	Johnson 31'; Robinson 76'; Earl (yellow card) 90+4'	Report	Baldock 23'; Yiadom (yellow card) 43'; Ilori 52'; Bacuna 81'	Stadium: Deepdale; Attendance: 10,849; Referee: Darren Bond

19 September 2018 8	Reading	1–2	Norwich City	Reading
20:00 BST (UTC+1)	Méïte (yellow card) 27'; Gunter (yellow card) 54'; Böðvarsson 72'	Report	Pukki 14'; Vrančić 73' (yellow card) 76'; Aarons (yellow card) 81'; Tettey (yellow card) 90+4'	Stadium: Madejski Stadium; Attendance: 12,822; Referee: Tim Robinson

22 September 2018 9	Reading	3–0	Hull City	Reading
15:00 BST (UTC+1)	Baldock 4'; O'Shea (yellow card) 58' (red card) 83'; Böðvarsson 70'; Yiadom 81'	Report	Campbell (yellow card) 33'; Elphick (yellow card) 90'	Stadium: Madejski Stadium; Attendance: 12,409; Referee: Jeremy Simpson

29 September 2018 10	Brentford	2–2	Reading	Brentford
15:00 BST (UTC+1)	Maupay 11' (yellow card) 78'; McEachran (yellow card) 52'; Watkins (yellow card) 55'; Benrahma (yellow card) 63' (yellow-red card) 86'; Barbet 90+2'; Judge (yellow card) 90+6'	Report	Böðvarsson 25'; Bacuna (yellow card) 52'; Swift 64'	Stadium: Griffin Park; Attendance: 10,045; Referee: Geoff Eltringham

2 October 2018 11	Reading	0–1	Queens Park Rangers	Reading
20:00 BST (UTC+1)	Méïte (yellow card) 55'; Ezatolahi (yellow card) 68'; Sims (yellow card) 70'	Report	Leistner 64'	Stadium: Madejski Stadium; Attendance: 13,568; Referee: Andy Davies

6 October 2018 12	West Bromwich Albion	4–1	Reading	West Bromwich
15:00 BST (UTC+1)	Dawson (yellow card) 41'; Gayle 49', 65'; Barry (yellow card) 52'; Barnes 72'; Bartley 80'	Report	Bacuna 6'; Swift (yellow card) 51'; Ilori (yellow card) 56'; Moore (yellow card) 82'	Stadium: The Hawthorns; Attendance: 22,865; Referee: Darren England

20 October 2018 13	Reading	3–1	Millwall	Reading
15:00 BST (UTC+1)	Méïté 28', 86'; Baldock 45' (pen.); Rinomhota (yellow card) 90+6'	Report	M.Wallace 34'; Romeo (yellow card) 44'; Cooper (yellow card) 59'	Stadium: Madejski Stadium; Attendance: 14,532; Referee: David Webb

23 October 2018 14	Birmingham City	2–1	Reading	Birmingham
19:45 BST (UTC+1)	Gardner 49' (yellow card) 90+3'; Jutkiewicz 70'	Report	Yiadom (yellow card) 18'; Swift (yellow card) 64'; Méïté 90'	Stadium: St Andrew's; Attendance: 22,126; Referee: Tony Harrington

27 October 2018 15	Swansea City	2–0	Reading	Swansea
15:00 BST (UTC+1)	McBurnie 36' (pen.), 84' (yellow card) 54'; Nordfeldt (yellow card) 66'	Report	Baldock (yellow card) 81'	Stadium: Liberty Stadium; Attendance: 18,785; Referee: Keith Stroud

3 November 2018 16	Reading	3–2	Bristol City	Reading
15:00 GMT (UTC)	Méïté 8'; Kelly 45+1'; Bacuna (yellow card) 59', (goal) 66'; Rinomhota (yellow card) 69'; Yiadom (yellow card) 87'; Baldock (yellow card) 90+1'; Gunter (yellow card) 90+6'	Report	Pack 23'; Brownhill 45+3'; Walsh (yellow card) 59'; Weimann (yellow card) 84'	Stadium: Madejski Stadium; Attendance: 14,455; Referee: James Linington

10 November 2018 17	Reading	2–2	Ipswich Town	Reading
15:00 GMT (UTC)	Méïté 7', 84'; Barrow (yellow card) 13'	Report	Edwards 5'; Sears 11'; Chambers (yellow card) 45+2'; Spence (yellow card) 86'	Stadium: Madejski Stadium; Attendance: 14,952; Referee: Darren Bond

24 November 2018 18	Wigan Athletic	0–0	Reading	Wigan
15:00 GMT (UTC)	Roberts (yellow card) 53'; Powell (yellow card) 59'; Garner (yellow card) 90+3'	Report	Gunter (yellow card) 33'	Stadium: DW Stadium; Attendance: 9,211; Referee: Oliver Langford

27 November 2018 19	Leeds United	1–0	Reading	Leeds
19:45 GMT (UTC)	Alioski (yellow card) 44'; Douglas (yellow card) 55'; Dallas 60' (yellow card) 81'	Report	McCleary (yellow card) 64'; Bacuna (yellow card) 75'; McNulty (penalty missed) 89'	Stadium: Elland Road; Attendance: 27,806; Referee: Mike Dean

1 December 2018 20	Reading	2–2	Stoke City	Reading
15:00 GMT (UTC)	Bacuna (yellow card) 35'; McNulty 42'; Yiadom (yellow card) 89'; Barrow 90+4'	Report	Afobe 48'; McClean (yellow card) 60'; Ince 69'	Stadium: Madejski Stadium; Attendance: 14,414; Referee: David Coote

8 December 2018 21	Reading	0–2	Sheffield United	Reading
17:30 GMT (UTC)	Loader (yellow card) 80'	Report	Fleck (yellow card) 23'; Sharp 84'; Baldock 86' (o.g.)	Stadium: Madejski Stadium; Attendance: 12,066; Referee: James Linington

15 December 2018 22	Rotherham United	1–1	Reading	Rotherham
15:00 GMT (UTC)	Mattock (yellow card) 45+2' (goal) 90'	Report	Sims (yellow card) 6'; Baldock 9'; Jaakkola (yellow card) 88'	Stadium: New York Stadium; Attendance: 8,775; Referee: Ross Joyce

22 December 2018 23	Reading	0–1	Middlesbrough	Reading
15:00 GMT (UTC)	Rinomhota (yellow card) 73'; Blackett (yellow card) 90'	Report	Bešić (yellow card) 41'; Friend 77'; Saville (yellow card) 79'	Stadium: Madejski Stadium; Attendance: 14,943; Referee: Steve Martin

26 December 2018 24	Millwall	1–0	Reading	Bermondsey
15:00 GMT (UTC)	Wallace 8'; Elliott (yellow card) 38'; Gregory (yellow card) 53'; Ferguson (yellow card) 77'	Report	Blackett (red card) 9'; Moore (yellow card) 67'; Bacuna (red card) 88'	Stadium: The Den; Attendance: 12,202; Referee: Andy Davies

29 December 2018 25	Queens Park Rangers	0–0	Reading	Shepherd's Bush
15:00 GMT (UTC)	Cousins (yellow card) 48'; Scowen (yellow card) 52'; Furlong (yellow card) 70'	Report	Swift (yellow card) 62'; O'Shea (yellow card) 68'	Stadium: Loftus Road; Attendance: 15,721; Referee: Robert Jones

1 January 2019 26	Reading	1–4	Swansea City	Reading
15:00 GMT (UTC)	Ilori (yellow card) 67'; Barrow (yellow card) 75'; Harriott 77'	Report	McBurnie 2', 48' (pen.); Roberts 30' (yellow card) 53' van der Hoorn 45'	Stadium: Madejski Stadium; Attendance: 15,644; Referee: Tim Robinson

12 January 2019 27	Reading	2–0	Nottingham Forest	Reading
15:00 GMT (UTC)	Swift 23'; Richards (yellow card) 32'; Moore (yellow card) 62'; Yiadom (yellow card) 62'; Robinson 87' (o.g.)	Report	Fox (yellow card) 8' (yellow-red card) 62'; Colback (yellow card) 38'; Murphy (yellow card) 61'; Robinson (yellow card) 62'; Darikwa (red card) 83'	Stadium: Madejski Stadium; Attendance: 15,034; Referee: Oliver Langford

19 January 2019 28	Derby County	2–1	Reading	Derby
15:00 GMT (UTC)	Holmes 3' (yellow card) 81'; Wilson 40'; Malone (yellow card) 69'	Report	Ejaria (yellow card) 65'; Aluko 66'	Stadium: Pride Park Stadium; Attendance: 26,404; Referee: Andy Woolmer

29 January 2019 29	Bolton Wanderers	1–1	Reading	Bolton
19:45 GMT (UTC)	Noone (yellow card) 35'; Taylor (yellow card) 58'; Hobbs 90+2'	Report	Gunter (yellow card) 53'; Rinomhota (yellow card) 60'; Swift (yellow card) 63'; Oliveira 74' (pen.)	Stadium: University of Bolton Stadium; Attendance: 12,195; Referee: Scott Duncan
Note: Match originally scheduled for 26 January, but moved due to Bolton's progression to the Fourth Round of the FA Cup.

2 February 2019 30	Reading	0–0	Aston Villa	Reading
15:00 GMT (UTC)	Swift (yellow card) 53'; Oliveira (yellow card) 55'; Yiadom (yellow card) 62'	Report	El Ghazi (yellow card) 49'; Whelan (yellow card) 49'; Carroll (yellow card) 87'; Hourihane (yellow card) 90+6'	Stadium: Madejski Stadium; Attendance: 17,458; Referee: Geoff Eltringham

9 February 2019 31	Sheffield Wednesday	0–0	Reading	Sheffield
15:00 GMT (UTC)		Report		Stadium: Hillsborough; Attendance: 23,412; Referee: John Brooks

13 February 2019 32	Reading	2–1	Blackburn Rovers	Reading
20:00 GMT (UTC)	Ejaria (yellow card) 40'; Swift 45+1'; Oliveira 86'	Report	Brereton (yellow card) 41'; Bell 82'	Stadium: Madejski Stadium; Attendance: 11,271; Referee: Stephen Martin

16 February 2019 33	Sheffield United	4–0	Reading	Sheffield
15:00 GMT (UTC)	Freeman 1'; Norwood (yellow card) 13'; Madine 16', 44'; Fleck 49'; Cranie (yellow card) 57'	Report	Swift (yellow card) 71'	Stadium: Bramall Lane; Attendance: 26,513; Referee: Robert Jones

23 February 2019 34	Reading	1–1	Rotherham United	Reading
15:00 GMT (UTC)	Ejaria 31'; Swift (yellow card) 54'	Report	Mattock (yellow card) 50'; Williams (yellow card) 59'; Ajayi 79'; Vaulks (yellow card) 89'	Stadium: Madejski Stadium; Attendance: 15,958; Referee: Jeremy Simpson

2 March 2019 35	Ipswich Town	1–2	Reading	Ipswich
15:00 GMT (UTC)	Nsiala (yellow card) 57'; Nolan (yellow card) 65'; Edwards 83' (yellow card) 85'	Report	Blackett (yellow card) 12'; Oliveira (yellow card) 13' (goal) 19'; Moore (yellow card) 37'; Barrow 90' (yellow card) 90+1'	Stadium: Portman Road; Attendance: 23,009; Referee: Geoff Eltringham

9 March 2019 36	Reading	3–2	Wigan Athletic	Reading
15:00 GMT (UTC)	Miazga (yellow card) 42'; Swift 45+3'; Moore (yellow card) 50'; Barrow 89'; Méïté 90+7' (yellow card) 90+8'	Report	Powell 20'; Garner (yellow card) 42' (goal) 64'; Robinson (yellow card) 57'; Jacobs (yellow card) 70'	Stadium: Madejski Stadium; Attendance: 15,401; Referee: Andy Davies

12 March 2019 37	Reading	0–3	Leeds United	Reading
20:00 GMT (UTC)	Swift (yellow card) 82'	Report	Roberts (yellow card) 9'; Klich 14'; Hernández 22', 43'; Ayling (yellow card) 29'; Douglas (yellow card) 86'	Stadium: Madejski Stadium; Attendance: 17,101; Referee: Gavin Ward

16 March 2019 38	Stoke City	0–0	Reading	Stoke-on-Trent
15:00 GMT (UTC)	Etebo (yellow card) 73'; Batth (yellow card) 77'; McClean (yellow card) 90'	Report	Harriott (yellow card) 44'; McCleary (yellow card) 62'; Swift (yellow card) 73'	Stadium: bet365 Stadium; Attendance: 24,368; Referee: Jeremy Simpson

30 March 2019 39	Reading	2–1	Preston North End	Reading
15:00 GMT (UTC)	Méïte 30'; Barrow 36'	Report	Fisher (yellow card) 72'; Moult 90+3'	Stadium: Madejski Stadium; Attendance: 16,771; Referee: Tony Harrington

6 April 2019 40	Hull City	3–1	Reading	Hull
15:00 BST (UTC+1)	de Wijs (yellow card) 15'; Grosicki 53', 77'; Pugh 65'; Irvine (yellow card) 73'; Martin (yellow card) 90+2'	Report	Baker 16'; Martínez (yellow card) 45'; Blackett (yellow card) 90+4'	Stadium: KCOM Stadium; Attendance: 11,268; Referee: Tim Robinson

10 April 2019 41	Norwich City	2–2	Reading	Norwich
19:45 BST (UTC+1)	Godfrey 86'; Zimmermann 88'	Report	Méïté 30'; Martínez (yellow card) 48'; Baker (yellow card) 62'; Rinomhota 90+7'	Stadium: Carrow Road; Attendance: 26,662; Referee: Keith Stroud

13 April 2019 42	Reading	2–1	Brentford	Reading
15:00 GMT (UTC)	Méïté 8', 15'; Ejaria (yellow card) 37'; Rinomhota (yellow card) 44'; Gunter (yellow card) 56'; Harriott (yellow card) 87'	Report	Maupay 45'; Sørensen (yellow card) 51'	Stadium: Madejski Stadium; Attendance: 16,892; Referee: Steve Martin

19 April 2019 43	Bristol City	1–1	Reading	Bristol
12:00 GMT (UTC)	Brownhill 72'	Report	Méïté 48'	Stadium: Ashton Gate; Attendance: 23,309; Referee: Oliver Langford

22 April 2019 44	Reading	0–0	West Bromwich Albion	Reading
15:00 GMT (UTC)	McCleary (yellow card) 84'; Yiadom (yellow card) 90+4'	Report	Harper (yellow card) 79'	Stadium: Madejski Stadium; Attendance: 17,255; Referee: Gavin Ward

27 April 2019 45	Middlesbrough	2–1	Reading	Middlesbrough
15:00 GMT (UTC)	Wing 31'; Assombalonga 39' (pen.); Howson (yellow card) 55'; Saville (yellow card) 90'; Hugill (yellow card) 90+5'	Report	Loader 11'; Harriott (yellow card) 66'	Stadium: Riverside Stadium; Attendance: 22,003; Referee: John Brooks

5 May 2019 46	Reading	0–0	Birmingham City	Reading
12:30 GMT (UTC)		Report	Harding (yellow card) 83'	Stadium: Madejski Stadium; Attendance: 17,247; Referee: Keith Stroud

=== EFL Cup ===
The second round draw was made from the Stadium of Light on 16 August.

14 August 2018 First Round	Reading	2–0	Birmingham City	Reading
20:00 BST (UTC+1)	Méïté 11'; Swift 72'; Rinomhota (yellow card) 78'	Report	Gardner (yellow card) 18'; Dacres-Cogley (yellow card) 30'	Stadium: Madejski Stadium; Attendance: 6,934; Referee: Dean Whitestone

29 August 2018 Second Round	Reading	0–2	Watford	Reading
20:00 BST (UTC+1)	Méïté (yellow card) 89'	Report	Success 36'; Quina 62'; Navarro (yellow card) 90+3'	Stadium: Madejski Stadium; Attendance: 9,265; Referee: Andy Davies

=== FA Cup ===
5 January 2019 Third Round	Manchester United	2–0	Reading	Manchester
12:30 GMT (UTC)	Mata 22' (pen.); Lukaku 45+4'; Chong (yellow card) 77'	Report	Yiadom (yellow card) 33'	Stadium: Old Trafford; Attendance: 73,918; Referee: Stuart Attwell

== Squad statistics ==
As of match played 5 May 2019

=== Appearances and goals ===
No.	Pos	Nat	Player	Total		Championship		FA Cup		League Cup	
No.	Pos	Nat	Player	Apps	Goals	Apps	Goals	Apps	Goals	Apps	Goals
2	DF	(Wales) WAL	Chris Gunter	24	0	18+5	0	0	0	1	0
3	DF	(Ghana) GHA	Andy Yiadom	47	1	44	1	1	0	1+1	0
4	DF	(Republic of Ireland) IRL	John O'Shea	11	0	7+2	0	0	0	1+1	0
5	DF	(Republic of Ireland) IRL	Paul McShane	5	0	4+1	0	0	0	0	0
6	DF	(England) ENG	Liam Moore	41	1	38	1	1	0	2	0
9	FW	(England) ENG	Sam Baldock	23	5	15+6	5	0	0	1+1	0
10	MF	(England) ENG	John Swift	37	4	28+6	3	1	0	2	1
12	MF	(Jamaica) JAM	Garath McCleary	32	0	14+17	0	1	0	0	0
15	MF	(Guyana) GUY	Callum Harriott	13	1	2+10	1	1	0	0	0
16	MF	(England) ENG	Lewis Baker	19	1	17+2	1	0	0	0	0
17	FW	(The Gambia) GAM	Modou Barrow	38	4	25+11	4	0+1	0	1	0
18	MF	(England) ENG	Ovie Ejaria	16	1	16	1	0	0	0	0
19	DF	(United States) USA	Matt Miazga	18	0	18	0	0	0	0	0
21	FW	(Ivory Coast) CIV	Yakou Méïté	40	13	31+6	12	0+1	0	2	1
22	FW	(Portugal) POR	Nélson Oliveira	10	3	9+1	3	0	0	0	0
23	FW	(Iceland) ISL	Jón Daði Böðvarsson	20	7	9+11	7	0	0	0	0
24	DF	(England) ENG	Tyler Blackett	31	0	28+2	0	0	0	1	0
26	GK	(Argentina) ARG	Emiliano Martínez	18	0	18	0	0	0	0	0
27	DF	(England) ENG	Omar Richards	13	0	9+2	0	1	0	1	0
28	GK	(England) ENG	Sam Walker	9	0	7	0	0	0	2	0
31	GK	(Finland) FIN	Anssi Jaakkola	16	0	15	0	1	0	0	0
32	MF	(Iran) IRI	Saeid Ezatolahi	4	0	4	0	0	0	0	0
35	MF	(England) ENG	Andy Rinomhota	28	1	24+2	1	1	0	0+1	0
38	MF	(Republic of Ireland) IRL	Liam Kelly	22	1	17+3	1	1	0	1	0
39	MF	(Republic of Ireland) IRL	Josh Barrett	2	0	1+1	0	0	0	0	0
42	MF	(England) ENG	Ryan East	1	0	1	0	0	0	0	0
43	FW	(England) ENG	Danny Loader	22	1	8+13	1	1	0	0	0
46	DF	(Scotland) SCO	Tom McIntyre	2	0	1+1	0	0	0	0	0
48	MF	(France) FRA	Michael Olise	4	0	2+2	0	0	0	0	0
49	DF	(England) ENG	Teddy Howe	1	0	0+1	0	0	0	0	0
Players away from the club on loan:
1	GK	(Italy) ITA	Vito Mannone	6	0	6	0	0	0	0	0
8	MF	(Republic of Ireland) IRL	David Meyler	5	0	5	0	0	0	0	0
14	FW	(Nigeria) NGR	Sone Aluko	20	1	13+6	1	0+1	0	0	0
25	MF	(Romania) ROU	Adrian Popa	1	0	0+1	0	0	0	0	0
29	FW	(Scotland) SCO	Marc McNulty	15	1	4+9	1	0	0	2	0
47	DF	(England) ENG	Gabriel Osho	2	0	1+1	0	0	0	0	0
Players who appeared for Reading but left during the season:
7	MF	(Curaçao) CUW	Leandro Bacuna	28	3	23+3	3	0	0	2	0
19	MF	(England) ENG	Josh Sims	17	0	5+11	0	0	0	0+1	0
20	DF	(Portugal) POR	Tiago Ilori	22	1	19	1	1	0	2	0
22	MF	(Netherlands) NED	Pelle Clement	1	0	0	0	0	0	0+1	0

=== Goal scorers ===
Place	Position	Nation	Number	Name	Championship	FA Cup	League Cup	Total
1	FW	(Ivory Coast)	21	Yakou Méïté	12	0	1	13
2	FW	(Iceland)	23	Jón Daði Böðvarsson	7	0	0	7
3	FW	(England)	9	Sam Baldock	5	0	0	5
4	FW	(The Gambia)	17	Modou Barrow	4	0	0	4
4	MF	(England)	10	John Swift	3	0	1	4
6	MF	(Curaçao)	7	Leandro Bacuna	3	0	0	3
6	FW	(Portugal)	22	Nélson Oliveira	3	0	0	3
8	DF	(England)	6	Liam Moore	1	0	0	1
8	DF	(Portugal)	20	Tiago Ilori	1	0	0	1
8	DF	(Ghana)	3	Andy Yiadom	1	0	0	1
8	MF	(Republic of Ireland)	38	Liam Kelly	1	0	0	1
8	FW	(Scotland)	29	Marc McNulty	1	0	0	1
8	MF	(Guyana)	15	Callum Harriott	1	0	0	1
8	FW	(Nigeria)	14	Sone Aluko	1	0	0	1
8	MF	(England)	18	Ovie Ejaria	1	0	0	1
8	MF	(England)	16	Lewis Baker	1	0	0	1
8	MF	(England)	35	Andy Rinomhota	1	0	0	1
8	FW	(England)	43	Danny Loader	1	0	0	1
8				Own goal	1	0	0	1
Total					49	0	2	51

=== Clean sheets ===
Place	Position	Nation	Number	Name	Championship	FA Cup	League Cup	Total
1	GK	(Argentina)	26	Emiliano Martínez	5	0	0	5
2	GK	(Finland)	31	Anssi Jaakkola	3	0	0	3
3	GK	(England)	1	Sam Walker	1	0	1	2
TOTALS					9	0	1	10

=== Disciplinary record ===
Number	Nation	Position	Name	Championship		FA Cup		League Cup		Total	
Number	Nation	Position	Name	Booked	Sent off (straight red)	Booked	Sent off (straight red)	Booked	Sent off (straight red)	Booked	Sent off (straight red)
2	(Wales)	DF	Chris Gunter	5	0	0	0	0	0	5	0
3	(Ghana)	DF	Andy Yiadom	7	0	1	0	0	0	8	0
4	(Republic of Ireland)	DF	John O'Shea	2	1	0	0	0	0	2	1
6	(England)	DF	Liam Moore	5	0	0	0	0	0	5	0
9	(England)	FW	Sam Baldock	2	0	0	0	0	0	2	0
10	(England)	MF	John Swift	9	0	0	0	0	0	9	0
12	(Jamaica)	MF	Garath McCleary	3	0	0	0	0	0	3	0
15	(Guyana)	MF	Callum Harriott	3	0	0	0	0	0	3	0
16	(England)	MF	Lewis Baker	1	0	0	0	0	0	1	0
17	(The Gambia)	FW	Modou Barrow	4	0	0	0	0	0	4	0
18	(England)	MF	Ovie Ejaria	3	0	0	0	0	0	3	0
19	(United States)	DF	Matt Miazga	1	0	0	0	0	0	1	0
21	(Ivory Coast)	FW	Yakou Méïté	5	0	0	0	1	0	6	0
22	(Portugal)	FW	Nélson Oliveira	2	0	0	0	0	0	2	0
24	(England)	DF	Tyler Blackett	4	1	0	0	0	0	4	1
26	(Argentina)	GK	Emiliano Martínez	2	0	0	0	0	0	2	0
27	(England)	DF	Omar Richards	1	0	0	0	0	0	1	0
32	(Iran)	MF	Saeid Ezatolahi	1	0	0	0	0	0	1	0
35	(England)	MF	Andy Rinomhota	5	0	0	0	1	0	6	0
38	(Republic of Ireland)	MF	Liam Kelly	2	0	0	0	0	0	2	0
43	(England)	FW	Danny Loader	1	0	0	0	0	0	1	0
Players away on loan:
8	(Republic of Ireland)	MF	David Meyler	1	0	0	0	0	0	1	0
Players who left Reading during the season:
7	(Curaçao)	MF	Leandro Bacuna	4	1	0	0	0	0	4	1
19	(England)	MF	Josh Sims	4	0	0	0	0	0	4	0
20	(Portugal)	DF	Tiago Ilori	2	0	0	0	0	0	2	0
Total				80	3	1	0	2	0	83	3

== Awards ==
=== Player of the season ===
Player of the season
#	Nation	Position	Player
1	(England)	MF	Andy Rinomhota
2	(Ghana)	DF	Andy Yiadom
3	(Ivory Coast)	FW	Yakou Méïté
