= 2025–26 FC Argeș Pitești season =

FC Argeș Pitești
- Chairman: Dănuț Coman
- Manager: Bogdan Andone
- Stadium: Orășenesc Stadium
- SuperLiga: Regular season: 6th
- SuperLiga: Championship play-off: 6th
- Cupa României: Semi-finals
- Top goalscorer: Ricardo Matos (10)

In the 2025-26 season, Fotbal Club Argeș plays in the Romanian SuperLiga after a two-year absence and in the Romanian Cup.

== Transfers ==
=== In ===
Pos.	Player	Transferred to	Fee	Date	Source
FW	(Brazil) Caio Ferreira	(Moldova) Bălți		1 July 2025	
DF	(Kosovo) Leard Sadriu	(Slovenia) Mura		1 July 2025	
MF	(Spain) Rober Sierra	(Romania) CSA Steaua București		1 July 2025	
FW	(Portugal) Ricardo Matos	(Romania) FC Gloria Buzău		8 July 2025	
FW	(Tunisia) Adel Bettaieb	(Romania) Universitatea Cluj		13 July 2025	
FW	(Romania) Claudiu Micovschi	(Romania) Rapid București		13 January 2026	

== Pre-season and friendlies ==
24 July 2025	Argeș Pitești	9–0	Vulturii Fărcăşeşti
10:00

8 August 2025	Argeș Pitești	6–1	CS Viitorul Dăești
10:30

6 September 2025	Argeș Pitești	3–0	AFC Câmpulung Muscel
11:00

14 November 2025	Argeș Pitești	6–0	AFC Câmpulung Muscel
11:00

6 January 2026	Argeș Pitești (Romania)	1–2	(Turkey) Bursaspor
16:00

9 January 2026	Argeș Pitești (Romania)	1–2	(Turkey) Gaziantep FK	Antalya, Turkey
14:30

== Competitions ==
=== Overal record ===
Competition	First match	Last match	Starting round	Final position	Record							
Competition	First match	Last match	Starting round	Final position	Pld	W	D	L	GF	GA	GD	Win %
SuperLiga	11 July 2025		Matchday 1		30	15	5	10	37	28	+9	50.00
Cupa României	27 August 2025	21 April 2026	Play-off round	Semi-finals	1	0	1	0	1	1	+0	0.00
Total					31	15	6	10	38	29	+9	48.39

Source: Competitions

=== SuperLiga ===
==== Regular season ====
Pos	Team	Pld	W	D	L	GF	GA	GD	Pts	Qualification
1	Universitatea Craiova	30	17	9	4	53	27	+26	60	Advances to Play-off
2	Rapid București	30	16	8	6	47	30	+17	56	Advances to Play-off
3	Universitatea Cluj	30	16	6	8	48	27	+21	54	Advances to Play-off
4	CFR Cluj	30	15	8	7	49	40	+9	53	Advances to Play-off
5	Dinamo București	30	14	10	6	42	28	+14	52	Advances to Play-off
6	Argeș Pitești	30	15	5	10	37	28	+9	50	Advances to Play-off
7	FCSB	30	13	7	10	48	40	+8	46	Advances to Play-out
8	UTA Arad	30	11	10	9	39	44	−5	43	Advances to Play-out
9	Botoșani	30	11	9	10	37	29	+8	42	Advances to Play-out
10	Oțelul Galați	30	11	8	11	39	32	+7	41	Advances to Play-out
11	Farul Constanța	30	10	7	13	39	37	+2	37	Advances to Play-out
12	Petrolul Ploiești	30	7	11	12	24	31	−7	32	Advances to Play-out
13	Csíkszereda Miercurea Ciuc	30	8	8	14	30	58	−28	32	Advances to Play-out
14	Unirea Slobozia	30	7	4	19	27	46	−19	25	Advances to Play-out
15	Hermannstadt	30	5	8	17	29	50	−21	23	Advances to Play-out
16	Metaloglobus București	30	2	6	22	25	66	−41	12	Advances to Play-out

Source: LPF (in Romanian)
Rules for classification: 1) Points; 2) Head-to-head points; 3) Head-to-head goal difference; 4) Head-to-head goals scored; 5) Goal difference; 6) Goals scored; 7) Play-off.

==== Results summary ====
Overall								Home						Away					
Pld	W	D	L	GF	GA	GD	Pts	W	D	L	GF	GA	GD	W	D	L	GF	GA	GD
30	15	5	10	37	28	+9	50	8	3	4	18	10	+8	7	2	6	19	18	+1

Last updated: complete.

==== Results by round ====
Round	1	2	3	4	5	6	7
Ground	H	A	A	H	A	H	A
Result	L	L	W	W	L	W	W
Position							

A = Away; H = Home; W = Win; D = Draw; L = Loss

==== Matches ====
11 July 2025 1	Argeș Pitești	0–2	Rapid București
21:30

18 July 2025 2	Universitatea Craiova	3–1	Argeș Pitești
21:30

27 July 2025 3	CFR Cluj	0–2	Argeș Pitești
18:30

2 August 2025 4	Argeș Pitești	3–1	Csíkszereda Miercurea Ciuc
18:30

11 August 2025 5	Botoșani	3–1	Argeș Pitești
19:00

18 August 2025 6	Argeș Pitești	2–0	Oțelul Galați
19:00

24 August 2025 7	FCSB	0–2	Argeș Pitești
21:30

31 August 2025 8	Argeș Pitești	2–1	Metaloglobus București
16:00

13 September 2025 9	UTA Arad	3–3	Argeș Pitești
16:00

20 September 2025 10	Argeș Pitești	1–0	Universitatea Cluj
18:45

26 September 2025 11	Hermannstadt	0–1	Argeș Pitești
18:00

4 October 2025 12	Argeș Pitești	0–1	Petrolul Ploiești
17:30

17 October 2025 13	Farul Constanța	0–0	Argeș Pitești
20:30

24 October 2025 14	Argeș Pitești	1–1	Dinamo București
20:30

1 November 2025 15	Unirea Slobozia	0–1	Argeș Pitești
17:30

8 November 2025 16	Rapid București	2–0	Argeș Pitești
20:30

21 November 2025 17	Argeș Pitești	1–2	Universitatea Craiova
20:30

29 November 2025 18	Argeș Pitești	3–0	CFR Cluj
16:30

6 December 2025 19	Csíkszereda Miercurea Ciuc	0–2	Argeș Pitești
17:00

13 December 2025 20	Argeș Pitești	0–0	Botoșani
17:00

20 December 2025 21	Oțelul Galați	2–1	Argeș Pitești
17:00

16 January 2026 22	Argeș Pitești	1–0	FCSB
20:00

23 January 2026 23	Metaloglobus București	0–2	Argeș Pitești
17:00

31 January 2026 24	Argeș Pitești	0–1	UTA Arad
17:00

3 February 2026 25	Universitatea Cluj	3–1	Argeș Pitești
18:00

6 February 2026 26	Argeș Pitești	3–1	Hermannstadt
17:00

13 February 2026 27	Petrolul Ploiești	2–1	Argeș Pitești
20:00

22 February 2026 28	Argeș Pitești	1–0	Farul Constanța
15:00

1 March 2026 29	Dinamo București	0–1	Argeș Pitești
18:00

8 March 2026 30	Argeș Pitești	0–0	Unirea Slobozia
17:00

==== Championship play-off ====
Pos	Team	Pld	W	D	L	GF	GA	GD	Pts	Qualification
1	Universitatea Craiova (C)	10	6	2	2	12	6	+6	50	Qualification to Champions League first qualifying round
2	Universitatea Cluj	10	6	1	3	13	11	+2	46	Qualification to Europa League first qualifying round (Note: The winner of the 2025–26 Cupa României (Universitatea Craiova) qualifies for the Europa League first qualifying round. Since the champions won the cup, this berth passed to the second place team.)
3	CFR Cluj	10	4	4	2	8	7	+1	43	Qualification to Conference League second qualifying round
4	Dinamo București	10	3	4	3	13	12	+1	39	Qualification to European competition play-offs
5	Rapid București	10	1	3	6	8	14	−6	34	
6	Argeș Pitești	10	1	4	5	6	10	−4	32	

Source: LPF (in Romanian)
Rules for classification: 1) Points; 2) Points without rounding; 3) Points in the regular season; 4) Head-to-head points; 5) Head-to-head goal difference; 6) Head-to-head goals scored; 7) Goal difference; 8) Goals scored; 9) Play-off (only if needed to decide champion or teams for UEFA competitions). (Note: only criteria 7 and 8 are applied to establish the classification during the competition.
(C) Champions

==== Results by round ====
Round	1	2	3	4	5	6
Ground	A	H	H	A	H	H
Result	W	L	D	D	L	
Position						

A = Away; H = Home; W = Win; D = Draw; L = Loss

13 March 2026 1	Universitatea Craiova	0–1	Argeș Pitești	Craiova
20:30

21 March 2026 2	Argeș Pitești	0–1	Universitatea Cluj	Mioveni
20:30				Stadium: Orășenesc Stadium

4 April 2026 3	Argeș Pitești	1–1	Dinamo București	Mioveni
19:30				Stadium: Orășenesc Stadium

13 April 2026 4	Rapid București	0–0	Argeș Pitești	Bucharest
18:30

17 April 2026 5	Argeș Pitești	0–1	CFR Cluj	Mioveni
20:30				Stadium: Orășenesc Stadium

27 April 2026 6	Argeș Pitești	v	Universitatea Craiova	Mioveni
20:30				Stadium: Orășenesc Stadium; Referee: Rareș Vidican

=== Cupa României ===
==== Play-off round ====
27 August 2025	FC Agricola Borcea	0–1	Argeș Pitești
17:30

==== Group stage ====
29 October 2025 1	Metaloglobus București	2–3	Argeș Pitești
15:00

2 December 2025 2	Argeș Pitești	2–1	Rapid București
19:30

10 February 2026 3	Dumbrăvița	1–2	Argeș Pitești
20:00

==== Knockout stage ====
4 March 2026 Quarter-finals	Argeș Pitești	3–2 (a.e.t.)	Gloria Bistrița
17:30

21 April 2026 Semi-finals	Argeș Pitești	1–1 (4–5 p)	Universitatea Cluj
19:30
