= Tiago Ilori =

Portuguese footballer (born 1993)

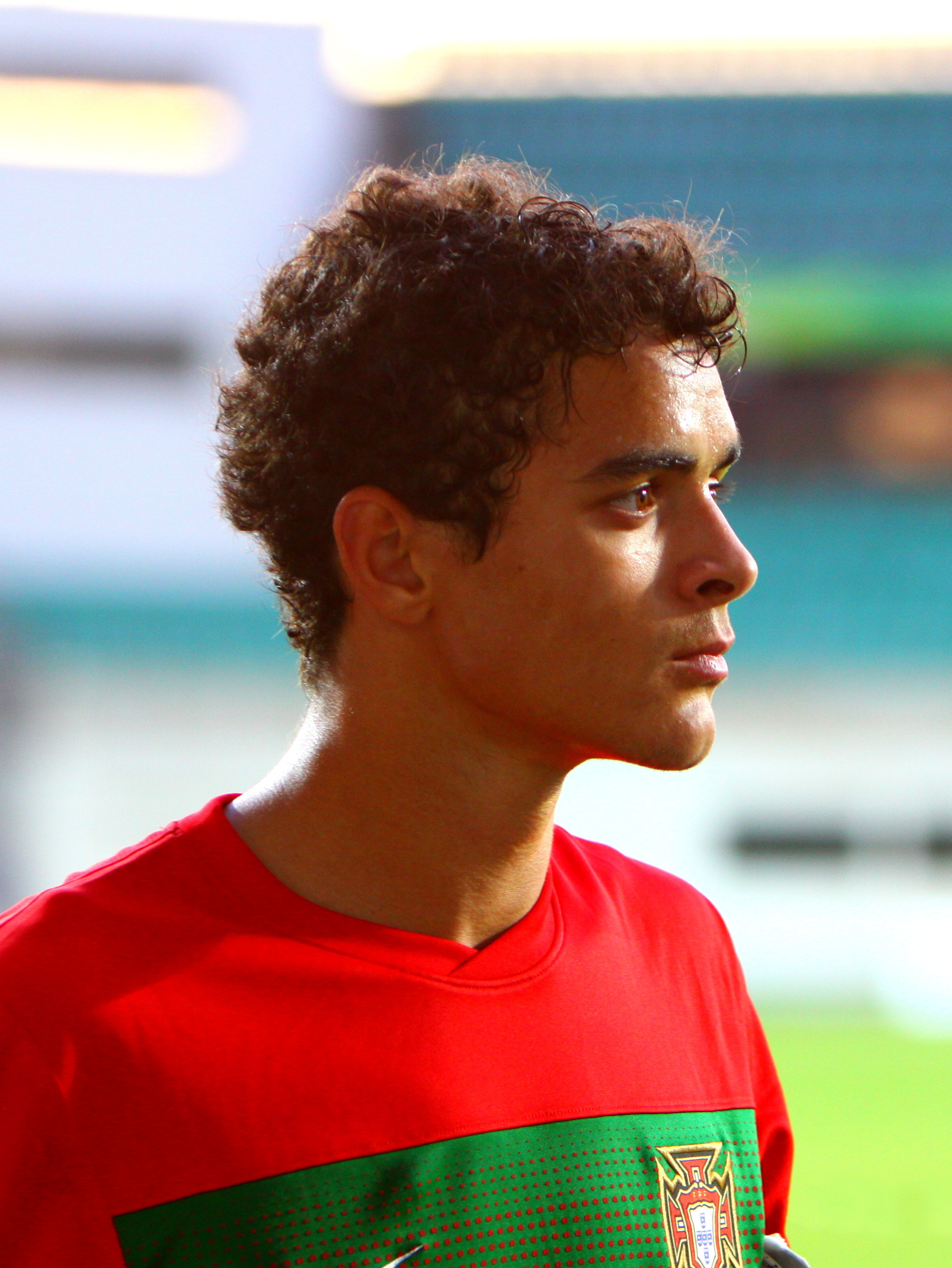
- Ilori playing for Portugal U19 in 2012

Personal information
- Full name: Tiago Abiola Delfim Almeida Ilori
- Date of birth: 26 February 1993 (age 33)
- Place of birth: Hampstead, England
- Height: 1.90 m (6 ft 3 in)
- Position: Centre-back

Youth career
- 2002–2006: Imortal
- 2006–2012: Sporting CP
- 2007–2008: → Estoril (loan)

Senior career*
| Years | Team | Apps | (Gls) |
| 2011–2013 | Sporting CP | 12 | (1) |
| 2012–2013 | Sporting CP B | 20 | (0) |
| 2013–2017 | Liverpool | 0 | (0) |
| 2014 | → Granada (loan) | 9 | (0) |
| 2014–2015 | → Bordeaux (loan) | 12 | (1) |
| 2015–2016 | → Aston Villa (loan) | 0 | (0) |
| 2017–2019 | Reading | 53 | (1) |
| 2019–2023 | Sporting CP | 14 | (0) |
| 2021 | → Lorient (loan) | 0 | (0) |
| 2021–2022 | → Boavista (loan) | 10 | (1) |
| 2022–2023 | → Paços Ferreira (loan) | 3 | (0) |
| 2024 | Belenenses | 8 | (0) |
| 2025 | Dila | 16 | (0) |

International career
| 2010–2011 | Portugal U18 | 2 | (0) |
| 2011–2012 | Portugal U19 | 15 | (1) |
| 2012–2013 | Portugal U20 | 9 | (0) |
| 2013–2015 | Portugal U21 | 10 | (1) |
| 2016 | Portugal U23 | 3 | (0) |
Medal record
Men's football
Representing Portugal
UEFA European Under-21 Championship
| Runner-up | 2015 Czech Republic |
- * Club domestic league appearances and goals as of 15:13, 2 March 2026 (UTC)

Tiago Abiola Delfim Almeida Ilori (born 26 February 1993) is a Portuguese professional footballer who plays as a centre-back.

He started his career with Sporting CP, making his debut with the first team in 2011 before signing with Liverpool two years later. He spent three seasons in the English Championship with Reading after joining in January 2017, and also played in Spain and France.

Ilori earned 36 caps for Portugal at youth level, including ten with the under-21 team.

== Club career ==
=== Sporting CP ===
Born in Hampstead, London to a British father of Nigerian descent and a Portuguese mother, Ilori spent his childhood in the town of Albufeira in the Algarve, where he started playing football with local Imortal DC. He joined Sporting CP's youth ranks in the summer of 2006 as a striker, being loaned to Lisbon neighbours G.D. Estoril Praia at the age of 14 and returning for three more years already reconverted as a stopper.

Ilori made his official debut for the Lions' first team on 6 November 2011, featuring the full 90 minutes in a 3–1 Primeira Liga home win against U.D. Leiria. On 14 December he played his first game in the UEFA Europa League, starting in a 2–0 group stage loss to SS Lazio at the Stadio Olimpico as his team had already secured the first place in their group.

In only his fourth competitive appearance for Sporting, on 16 February 2013 at Gil Vicente FC, Ilori again played the entire match, and helped to a 3–2 victory by scoring the former's second goal in the sixth minute.

=== Liverpool ===
On 2 September 2013, Ilori was signed by Liverpool for an undisclosed fee, reported to be around £7 million. It was also announced that The Football Association were in talks with the player for him to switch nationality and represent England internationally.

On 5 January 2014, Ilori was named on his new team's bench for the first time, in an FA Cup match against Oldham Athletic. Fifteen days later, he was loaned to Granada CF in La Liga until the end of the campaign. On 7 February he made his debut for the Andalusians, in a 1–0 away defeat to RCD Espanyol. In the following round he also started, and assisted Piti for the game's only goal at home against Real Betis.

Ilori was loaned again on 18 August 2014, now to FC Girondins de Bordeaux from France. He scored in his third Ligue 1 appearance, helping a to a 1–1 draw at AS Saint-Étienne.

Fellow Premier League club Aston Villa signed Ilori on a season-long loan deal on 1 September 2015. On 7 January 2016, the move was cancelled and he returned to Liverpool, making his first competitive appearance with the first team the following day by starting the FA Cup third round match against Exeter City, which ended with a 2–2 draw at St James Park.

=== Reading ===
Ilori completed a transfer to EFL Championship side Reading on 18 January 2017, for a reported £3.75 million. He made his debut three days later, starting in a 3–2 away loss against Derby County. He totalled eight matches for the season, including the penalty shootout loss to Huddersfield Town in the play-off final on 29 May.

On 5 August 2017, Ilori was sent off in the first game of the new campaign for a foul on Paweł Wszołek, from which Conor Washington scored a penalty in a 2–0 Queens Park Rangers victory. He scored his first goal in English football on 15 September 2018, in a 3–2 win at Preston North End.

=== Return to Sporting ===
On 29 January 2019, Ilori returned to Sporting for an undisclosed fee, with the player signing a four-and-a-half-year contract. During most of his spell, he played second-fiddle to Sebastián Coates and Jérémy Mathieu.

Ilori joined FC Lorient on 1 February 2021, on loan until 30 June. In August, in a similar deal, he moved to Boavista FC.

In July 2022, still owned by Sporting, Ilori signed a one-year loan deal with F.C. Paços de Ferreira. In August 2023, he left the Estádio José Alvalade after his contract expired.

=== Later career ===
Ilori returned to Portugal and its capital on 30 December 2023, agreeing to a six-month contract at C.F. Os Belenenses of the Liga Portugal 2. On 25 March 2025, he moved to the Georgian Erovnuli Liga with FC Dila Gori on a deal until the end of the season.

On 10 December 2025, Ilori was an unused substitute as Dila won the Georgian Cup by defeating FC Iberia 1999 3–1; his compatriot Pedro Mendes took part in the match.

== International career ==
Ilori played for Portugal at four youth levels, representing the nation at the 2012 UEFA European Under-19 Championship, the 2013 FIFA U-20 World Cup, the 2013 Toulon Tournament and the 2015 UEFA European Under-21 Championship. He remained eligible to play for Portugal, England and Nigeria as a senior.

== Career statistics ==
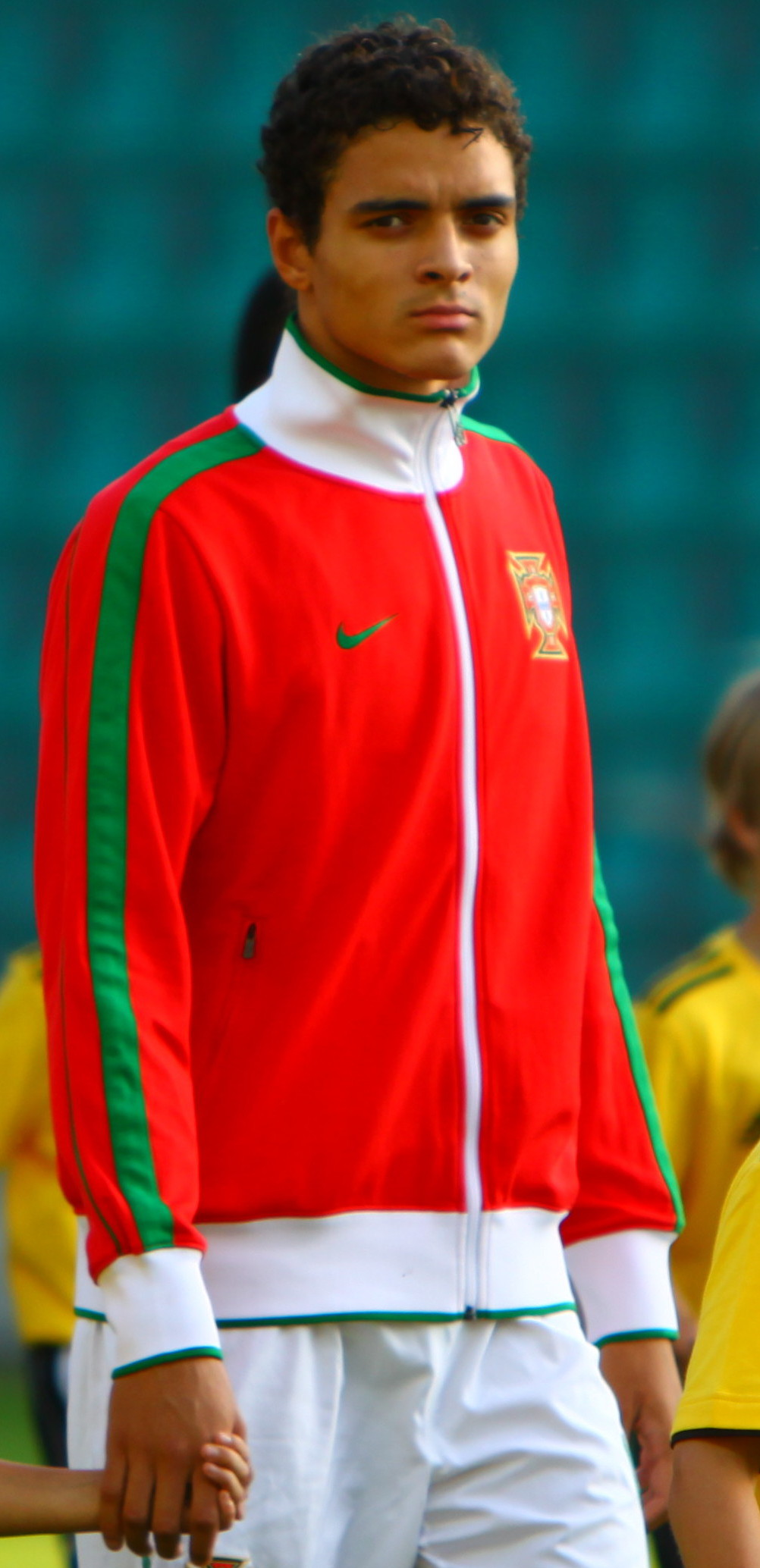
Ilori in 2012

As of match played 6 December 2025

Appearances and goals by club, season and competition
| Club | Season | League | | | National cup | | League cup | | Continental | | Other | | Total | |
| Club | Season | Division | Apps | Goals | Apps | Goals | Apps | Goals | Apps | Goals | Apps | Goals | Apps | Goals |
|---|---|---|---|---|---|---|---|---|---|---|---|---|---|---|
| Sporting CP | 2011–12 | Primeira Liga | 1 | 0 | 0 | 0 | 0 | 0 | 1 (Note: Appearances in UEFA Europa League) | 0 | — | | 2 | 0 |
| Sporting CP | 2012–13 | Primeira Liga | 11 | 1 | 0 | 0 | 0 | 0 | 1 | 0 | — | | 12 | 1 |
| Sporting CP | Total | | 12 | 1 | 0 | 0 | 0 | 0 | 2 | 0 | 0 | 0 | 14 | 1 |
| Liverpool | 2013–14 | Premier League | 0 | 0 | 0 | 0 | 0 | 0 | — | | — | | 0 | 0 |
| Liverpool | 2014–15 | Premier League | 0 | 0 | 0 | 0 | 0 | 0 | 0 | 0 | — | | 0 | 0 |
| Liverpool | 2015–16 | Premier League | 0 | 0 | 3 | 0 | 0 | 0 | 0 | 0 | — | | 3 | 0 |
| Liverpool | 2016–17 | Premier League | 0 | 0 | 0 | 0 | 0 | 0 | — | | — | | 0 | 0 |
| Liverpool | Total | | 0 | 0 | 3 | 0 | 0 | 0 | 0 | 0 | 0 | 0 | 3 | 0 |
| Granada (loan) | 2013–14 | La Liga | 9 | 0 | 0 | 0 | — | | — | | — | | 9 | 0 |
| Bordeaux (loan) | 2014–15 | Ligue 1 | 12 | 1 | 2 | 0 | 1 | 0 | — | | — | | 15 | 1 |
| Aston Villa (loan) | 2015–16 | Premier League | 0 | 0 | 0 | 0 | 0 | 0 | — | | — | | 0 | 0 |
| Reading | 2016–17 | Championship | 5 | 0 | 0 | 0 | 0 | 0 | — | | 3 (Note: Appearances in EFL Championship play-offs) | 0 | 8 | 0 |
| Reading | 2017–18 | Championship | 29 | 0 | 3 | 0 | 2 | 0 | — | | — | | 34 | 0 |
| Reading | 2018–19 | Championship | 19 | 1 | 1 | 0 | 2 | 0 | — | | — | | 22 | 1 |
| Reading | Total | | 53 | 1 | 4 | 0 | 4 | 0 | 0 | 0 | 3 | 0 | 64 | 1 |
| Sporting CP | 2018–19 | Primeira Liga | 6 | 0 | 3 | 0 | 0 | 0 | 1 | 0 | — | | 10 | 0 |
| Sporting CP | 2019–20 | Primeira Liga | 8 | 0 | 0 | 0 | 1 | 0 | 4 | 0 | — | | 13 | 0 |
| Sporting CP | 2020–21 | Primeira Liga | 0 | 0 | 0 | 0 | 0 | 0 | 0 | 0 | — | | 0 | 0 |
| Sporting CP | Total | | 14 | 0 | 3 | 0 | 1 | 0 | 5 | 0 | 0 | 0 | 23 | 0 |
| Lorient (loan) | 2020–21 | Ligue 1 | 0 | 0 | 0 | 0 | 0 | 0 | — | | — | | 0 | 0 |
| Boavista (loan) | 2021–22 | Primeira Liga | 10 | 1 | 1 | 0 | 1 | 0 | — | | — | | 12 | 1 |
| Paços Ferreira (loan) | 2022–23 | Primeira Liga | 3 | 0 | 1 | 0 | 0 | 0 | — | | — | | 4 | 0 |
| Os Belenenses | 2023–24 | Liga Portugal 2 | 8 | 0 | 0 | 0 | 0 | 0 | — | | — | | 8 | 0 |
| Dila | 2025 | Erovnuli Liga | 16 | 0 | 2 | 0 | — | | 1 (Note: Appearances in UEFA Conference League) | 0 | — | | 19 | 0 |
| Career total | | | 137 | 4 | 15 | 0 | 7 | 0 | 8 | 0 | 3 | 0 | 171 | 4 |

== Honours ==
Sporting CP

- Taça de Portugal: 2018–19

Dila

- Georgian Cup: 2025
