= George Legg =

English footballer

Personal information
- Full name: George Jack Adam Legg
- Date of birth: 30 April 1996 (age 30)
- Place of birth: Reading, England
- Height: 6 ft 6 in (1.98 m)
- Position: Goalkeeper

Team information
- Current team: Swindon Supermarine

Youth career
- –2014: Reading
- 2013: → Oxford United (loan)

Senior career*
Years	Team	Apps	(Gls)
2013–2019	Reading	0	(0)
2013	→ Holyport (loan)	2	(0)
2014	→ Hendon (loan)	10	(0)
2014	→ Dunstable Town (loan)	1	(0)
2015	→ Chesham United (loan)	12	(0)
2015–2016	→ Hampton & Richmond Borough (loan)	7	(0)
2016	→ Gosport Borough (loan)	10	(0)
2016–2017	→ Hungerford Town (loan)	31	(0)
2018	→ Barnet (loan)	3	(0)
2018	→ Aldershot Town (loan)	2	(0)
2018	→ Braintree Town (loan)	5	(0)
2019	→ Boreham Wood (loan)	8	(0)
2020	Thatcham Town	8	(0)
2023	Hanwell Town	11	(0)
2024–2025	Uxbridge	19	(0)
2025–2026	Swindon Supermarine	0	(0)
- * Club domestic league appearances and goals as of 16:44, 14 September 2024 (UTC)

George Jack Adam Legg (born 30 April 1996) is an English footballer who plays as a goalkeeper for Swindon Supermarine.

== Career ==
Legg began his career in the academy at Reading, where he had loan spells at Holyport, Oxford United, Hendon, Dunstable Town, Chesham United, Hampton & Richmond Borough, Gosport Borough and Hungerford Town, from whom he was recalled from a season-long loan to appear on the bench in two Championship matches. Legg featured for Reading's development team in the EFL Trophy in the 2017–18 season before joining Barnet on loan on 31 January 2018. He made his English Football League debut against Colchester United on 24 February 2018.

On 7 September 2018, Legg joined Aldershot Town on a month long loan, where he made 2 appearances in the Vanarama Conference. He then returned to Reading and was on the bench for 2 Championship games.

On 16 November 2018, Legg joined Braintree Town on a month-long loan deal. On 18 January 2019, Legg joined Boreham Wood on loan until the end of the season.

He was released by Reading at the end of the 2018–19 season.

George signed with Thatcham Town in 2020 before being released in November of the same year.

In June 2023, Legg signed for Hanwell Town. followed by a move to Uxbridge starting in 2024, with whom he achieved promotion to the Southern League Premier Division South in the 2024/25 season.[3]

On 8 June 2025, Legg signed for Swindon Supermarine under Bobby Wilkinson, a former manager from his loan-spell at Hungerford Town in 2016.

== Career statistics ==
=== Club ===
As of Matches played 22 April 2019

Appearances and goals by club, season and competition
Club	Season	League			National Cup		League Cup		Continental		Other		Total	
Club	Season	Division	Apps	Goals	Apps	Goals	Apps	Goals	Apps	Goals	Apps	Goals	Apps	Goals
Reading	2014–15	Championship	0	0	0	0	0	0	–		–		0	0
Reading	2015–16	Championship	0	0	0	0	0	0	–		–		0	0
Reading	2016–17	Championship	0	0	0	0	0	0	–		0	0	0	0
Reading	2017–18	Championship	0	0	0	0	0	0	–		–		0	0
Reading	2018–19	Championship	0	0	0	0	0	0	–		–		0	0
Reading	Total		0	0	0	0	0	0	-	-	0	0	0	0
Reading U23	2016–17	Premier League 2 - Division 1	3	0	2	0	—		0	0	0	0	5	0
Reading U23	2017–18	Premier League 2 - Division 2	15	0	0	0	—		2	0	3 (Note: Appearances in EFL Trophy)	0	20	0
Reading U23	2018-19	Premier League 2- Division 2	1	0	0	0	–		1	0	0	0	2	0
Reading U23	Total		19	0	2	0	—		3	0	3	0	27	0
Holyport (loan)	2013–14	Hellenic League Premier Division	2	0	0	0	–		–		0	0	2	0
Hendon (loan)	2014–15	Isthmian League Premier Division	10	0	0	0	–		–		0	0	10	0
Dunstable Town (loan)	2014–15	Southern League Premier Division	1	0	1	0	–		–		0	0	2	0
Chesham United (loan)	2015–16	Southern League Premier Division	12	0	4	0	–		–		0	0	16	0
Hampton & Richmond Borough (loan)	2015–16	Isthmian League Premier Division	7	0	1	0	–		–		0	0	8	0
Gosport Borough (loan)	2015–16	National League South	10	0	0	0	0	0	–		–		10	0
Hungerford Town (loan)	2016–17	National League South	31	0	0	0	–		–		–		31	0
Barnet (loan)	2017–18	League Two	3	0	0	0	0	0	–		–		3	0
Aldershot Town (loan)	2018–19	National League	2	0	0	0	–		–		0	0	2	0
Braintree Town (loan)	2018–19	National League	5	0	0	0	–		–		0	0	5	0
Boreham Wood (loan)	2018–19	National League	8	0	0	0	–		–		0	0	8	0
Thatcham Town FC	2020-2021	Division One South	1	0	0	0	0	0	0	0	0	0	1	0
Career total			116	0	8	0	0	0	2	0	3	0	129	0
