= Midana Sambú =

Portuguese footballer

Personal information
- Full name: Midana Quintino Sambú
- Date of birth: 10 June 1998 (age 28)
- Place of birth: Bissau, Guinea-Bissau
- Height: 1.70 m (5 ft 7 in)
- Positions: Winger; attacking midfielder

Team information
- Current team: Belenenses
- Number: 11

Youth career
- –2015: Sacavenense
- 2016–2019: Braga

Senior career*
Years	Team	Apps	(Gls)
2015–2016	Sacavenense	1	(0)
2016–2019	Braga B	11	(0)
2019–2020	Fátima	16	(1)
2020–2021	Valadares Gaia	27	(6)
2021–2022	Torreense	24	(2)
2023–	Belenenses	80	(9)

International career^{‡}
2016	Portugal U18	5	(0)
2017	Portugal U19	3	(0)
- * Club domestic league appearances and goals as of 7 May 2026 ‡ National team caps and goals as of 14 February 2017

Midana Quintino Sambú (born 10 June 1998) is a Bissau-Guinean-born Portuguese professional footballer who plays as a winger or attacking midfielder for Liga 3 club Belenenses.

== Club career ==
On 27 September 2017, Sambú made his professional debut with Braga B in a 2017–18 LigaPro match against Famalicão.

On 23 December 2022, Sambú signed with Os Belenenses.
