= Duarte Valente =

Portuguese footballer

Personal information
- Full name: Duarte Urtigueira Gouveia Beirão Valente
- Date of birth: 2 November 1999 (age 27)
- Place of birth: Estoril, Portugal
- Height: 1.82 m (6 ft 0 in)
- Position: Defensive midfielder

Team information
- Current team: Al Bidda

Youth career
- 2008–2017: Estoril

Senior career*
Years	Team	Apps	(Gls)
2017–2021	Estoril	16	(0)
2021	Karmiotissa	12	(0)
2021–2022	Olympiacos Volos	4	(0)
2022–2024	Belenenses	65	(7)

International career^{‡}
2018	Portugal U19	4	(0)
- * Club domestic league appearances and goals as of 1 June 2024 ‡ National team caps and goals as of 5 June 2018

Duarte Urtigueira Gouveia Beirão Valente (born 2 November 1999) is a Portuguese professional footballer who plays as a defensive midfielder.

== Club career ==
On 14 August 2017, Valente made his professional debut with Estoril Praia in a 2017–18 Primeira Liga match against Vitória Guimarães.
