= Gianluca Nani =

Gianluca Nani (born 1 October 1962) is an Italian sporting and football technical director.

== Football career ==
Nani organised football tournaments in Spain before working as Brescia Calcio's sporting director commencing in 1999. During this time he was credited with developing talents such as World Cup winners Andrea Pirlo and Luca Toni. He was also involved in the arrival of 1993 FIFA World Player of the Year Roberto Baggio, who spent four years at the club.

On 17 March 2008 it was announced that he would take up this role for English Premier League team West Ham United. He joined the club in June 2008 having signed a three-year contract, and had responsibility for the academy, scouting, transfers (with team manager Gianfranco Zola), and for the training ground department. In February 2010, Nani was dismissed from his role as technical director at West Ham.

In July 2012, Nani joined Watford as a technical director. He was joined at the club by Zola, as well as former West Ham chief executive Scott Duxbury. Nani resigned from his position on 2 September 2014 to pursue new challenges.

In December 2015, Nani was named the new Technical Director of Abu Dhabi outfit Al Jazira Club, a UAE League club chaired by Manchester City owner Sheikh Mansour bin Zayed Al Nahyan.

On 7 December 2018, Nani left Reading by mutual consent, less than three months after joining the club.

== Personal life ==
Born in Rome, Nani studied law. He speaks English, Spanish, and French along with his native Italian.
