= Rúben Pina =

Cape Verdean footballer (born 2000)

Personal information
- Full name: Rúben Filipe Tavares Pina
- Date of birth: 20 January 2000 (age 26)
- Place of birth: Lisbon, Portugal
- Height: 1.84 m (6 ft 0 in)
- Position: Winger

Team information
- Current team: Leixões
- Number: 88

Youth career
- 2008–2009: Olivais e Moscavide
- 2009–2012: Sporting CP
- 2012–2017: Belenenses
- 2017–2020: Aves
- 2020–2022: Estoril

Senior career*
Years	Team	Apps	(Gls)
2022–2023	Alverca	26	(4)
2023–2024	Belenenses	31	(3)
2024–2026	Chaves	35	(6)
2026–	Leixões	9	(0)

International career^{‡}
2025–	Cape Verde	2	(0)
- * Club domestic league appearances and goals as of 11 September 2026 ‡ National team caps and goals as of 13:23, 30 May 2025 (UTC)

Rúben Filipe Tavares Pina (Portuguese: [ˈʀu.bɛn fi.ˈli.pɨ ta.ˈva.ɾɨʃ ˈpi.nɐ]; born 20 January 2000) is a professional footballer who plays as a winger for Liga Portugal 2 club Leixões. Born in Portugal, he plays for the Cape Verde national team.

== Club career ==
Pina is a product of the youth academies of the Portuguese clubs Olivais e Moscavide, Sporting CP, Belenenses, Aves, and Estoril.

On 10 July 2022, he signed with the Liga 3 side Alverca on a contract until 2024 where he began his senior career.

On 27 July 2023, he moved to Belenenses in the Liga Portugal 2.

On 2 July 2024, he transferred to Chaves. On 29 January 2026, his contract was terminated by mutual agreement.

== International career ==
Born in Portugal, Pina is of Cape Verdean descent. He was called up to the Cape Verde national team for a set of friendlies in May 2025.
