= Ricardo Matos (footballer, born 2000) =

Portuguese footballer

Personal information
- Full name: Ricardo Manuel Pinho Matos
- Date of birth: 25 March 2000 (age 26)
- Place of birth: Vale de Figueira, Portugal
- Height: 1.83 m (6 ft 0 in)
- Position: Forward

Team information
- Current team: Argeş Piteşti
- Number: 17

Youth career
- 2009–2019: Benfica
- 2018: → Belenenses (loan)
- 2019: Ascoli

Senior career*
Years	Team	Apps	(Gls)
2020–2021	Ascoli	5	(0)
2021	→ Casertana (loan)	12	(2)
2021–2022	Olhanense	11	(7)
2022–2024	Portimonense	20	(2)
2023–2024	→ Belenenses (loan)	29	(5)
2024–2025	Gloria Buzău	22	(6)
2025–	Argeş Piteşti	43	(11)
- * Club domestic league appearances and goals as of 6 November 2026

Ricardo Manuel Pinho Matos (born 25 March 2000) is a Portuguese professional footballer who plays as a forward for Liga I club Argeș Pitești.

== Club career ==
On 7 August 2019, he signed a 3-year contract with Italian Serie B club Ascoli.

He made his Serie B debut for Ascoli on 18 January 2020 in a game against Trapani. He substituted Leonardo Morosini in the 83rd minute.

On 1 February 2021, he joined Serie C club Casertana on loan.

On 16 August 2021, he joined to Ascoli on permanent basis.

On 31 January 2022 he joined Primeira Liga club Portimonense.

On 14 July 2023, Portimonense sent Matos on a season-long loan to Liga Portugal 2 side Belenenses.

== Career statistics ==
=== Club ===
As of match played 6 November 2026

Club	Season	League			National cup (Note: Includes Coppa Italia, Taça de Portugal, Cupa României)		Europe		Other		Total	
Club	Season	Division	Apps	Goals	Apps	Goals	Apps	Goals	Apps	Goals	Apps	Goals
Ascoli	2019–20	Serie B	2	0	–		–		–		2	0
Ascoli	2020–21	Serie B	3	0	1	0	–		–		4	0
Ascoli	Total		5	0	1	0	–		–		6	0
Casertana (loan)	2020–21	Serie C	12	2	–		–		0	0	12	2
Olhanense	2021–22	Campeonato de Portugal	10	7	4	3	–		–		14	10
Portimonense	2021–22	Primeira Liga	5	1	–		–		–		5	1
Portimonense	2022–23	Primeira Liga	15	1	1	0	–		3 (Note: Appearances in Taça da Liga)	1	19	2
Portimonense	Total		20	2	1	0	–		3	1	24	3
Belenenses (loan)	2023–24	Liga Portugal 2	29	5	2	1	–		1	0	32	10
Gloria Buzău	2024–25	Liga I	22	6	0	0	–		–		22	6
Argeș Pitești	2025–26	Liga I	33	10	6	2	–		–		39	12
Argeș Pitești	2026–27	Liga I	10	1	0	0	–		–		10	1
Argeș Pitești	Total		43	11	6	2	–		–		49	13
Career total			141	33	13	6	–		4	1	158	40
