= Brian Tevreden (footballer, born 1981) =

Dutch footballer and club executive

Personal information
- Full name: Brian Tevreden
- Date of birth: 26 November 1981 (age 44)
- Place of birth: Amsterdam, Netherlands
- Height: 1.79 m (5 ft 10 1/2 in)
- Position: Defender

Senior career*
Years	Team	Apps	(Gls)
2002–2004	Volendam	34	(0)
2004–2006	Emmen	50	(1)
2006–2007	Panthrakikos	19	(2)
2007–2008	Fostiras	11	(0)
2008–2009	Dordrecht	2	(0)
Total		116	(3)
- * Club domestic league appearances and goals

Brian Tevreden (born 26 November 1981) is a Dutch former professional footballer who now works as general manager for the Suriname national football team.

== Playing career ==
Tevreden began his career as a defender with FC Volendam and he spent two seasons with the club, appearing in 15 Eredivisie matches. He joined Eerste divisie club FC Emmen in July 2004 after playing against Mansfield Town for Leeds United. In late 2006, Tevreden moved to Greece where he would play for Panthrakikos F.C. in the Beta Ethniki and Fostiras F.C. in the Gamma Ethniki. He returned to the Netherlands to play for FC Dordrecht in the 2008–09 Eerste divisie season.

== After retirement ==
After retiring from professional football Tevreden joined Ajax in 2011 as a coach working within the club's youth system.

In February 2016 Tevreden left Ajax to join English club Reading where he was appointed Head of International Football and Development. When Director of Football at Reading Nick Hammond left the club to join West Brom in April 2016, Tevreden was promoted to take up the role of Director of Football. In September 2018, he left the club and became chief executive at Belgian side K.S.V. Roeselare. In 2024 Brian officially became the general manager of the Surinamese national football team.
