= Gravenberch =

Gravenberch is a surname. Notable people with the surname include:

- Adolf Frederik Gravenberch (1811–1906), Surinamese physician
- Danzell Gravenberch (born 1994), Dutch footballer
- Ryan Gravenberch (born 2002), Dutch footballer
