= Delano Rigters =

Surinamese footballer

Personal information
- Full name: Delano Lloyd Rigters
- Date of birth: December 31, 1956 (age 69)
- Place of birth: Coronie District, Surinam
- Position: Forward

Youth career
- 1970–1972: Racing Club Coronie
- 1972–1974: Voorwaarts

Senior career*
| Years | Team | Apps | (Gls) |
| 1974–1975 | Voorwaarts | ? | (?) |
| 1975–1976 | MVV | ? | (?) |
| 1976–1990 | Robinhood | ? | (?) |
| 1990–1991 | Real Sranang | ? | (?) |

International career^{‡}
| 1976–1990 | Suriname | 17 | (5) |
- * Club domestic league appearances and goals as of December 20, 2015 ‡ National team caps and goals as of December 20, 2015

Delano Lloyd Rigters (born 31 December 1956) is a former Surinamese International football player who played his entire career in Suriname, playing for Voorwaarts, MVV, Robinhood as well as for the Suriname national team. He spent 16 years with Robinhood, finishing as the league top goal scorer four times. He also helped his club win ten national titles, having made it to the CONCACAF Champions' Cup final on three occasions.

== Career ==
=== Early career ===
Rigters was born in 1956 in the Coronie District, Surinam where he joined local Racing Club Coronie at age 12. As a young child he was already allowed to play matches with the first team, and had won the District championship on a few occasions before moving to the Capital Paramaribo to join the youth ranks of S.V. Voorwaarts.

=== SV Voorwaarts ===
In 1972 Rigters relocated to Paramaribo to attend the Technical School, where he was living in Latour. He joined the youth ranks of S.V. Voorwaarts, stating their willingness to integrate youth players into the selection as his reason for joining the club. Progressing through the ranks, Rigters made his debut for the first team in 1974 playing his first full season in the SVB Hoofdklasse at age 18. A year later he was called up for military service, forcing him to part ways with his club.

=== MVV ===
In 1975 Rigters was called up to serve in the military. During his service he played for the Militaire Voetbal Vereniging for two seasons. The first season saw MVV win the SVB Eerste Klasse title undefeated, thus getting promoted to the SVB Hoofdklasse. The following season saw Rigters gain widespread attention for his goal scoring abilities. He was the only player from MVV who was called up to play for the national team in their 1978 FIFA World Cup qualifying campaign, where he played amongst the likes of Edwin Schal, Frits Purperhart and Roy Vanenburg.

=== SV Robinhood ===
In 1976 Rigters joined S.V. Robinhood right after the team had returned from a trip to the Netherlands, where they had lost to AFC Ajax 4–3 and defeated HFC Haarlem in a 3–1 win. Rigters found himself playing with the likes of Roy George, Arnold Miller, Wilfred Garden, Remie Olmberg, Errol Emanuelson, Milton Lieveld, Harold Held en Roy and John Castillon. As part of one of the best teams in Suriname's football history, Rigters won 10 national championships with the club in the years between 1979 and 1989, only leaving the 1982 national title behind to S.V. Leo Victor. It was at Robinhood where Rigters was given his nickname 'DC-10', named after the McDonnell Douglas DC-10 jet airliner.

In Rigters first season with the club Robinhood would go on to win consecutive national titles while also making it to the 1976 CONCACAF Champions' Cup final, finishing second to Águila from El Salvador, losing 8–2 on aggregate score in the final. In 1977, he helped Robinhood to the 1977 CONCACAF Champions' Cup final for the second time in a row where they faced Club América from Mexico, losing 2–1 on aggregate score. In 1982, he helped Robinhood back to a second-place finish at the 1982 CONCACAF Champions' Cup where they faced Pumas UNAM from Mexico in the final, losing 3–2 on aggregate score. In 1983 the team were back in the 1983 CONCACAF Champions' Cup finals, where they faced Atlante F.C. from Mexico in the final, losing 6–1 on aggregate score. It was Rigters fifth time in the finals of the competition without lifting the cup.

In July 1986, Rigters travelled to the Netherlands to play friendly matches in pre-season training. Robinhood lost to SBV Excelsior 1–0, and Kleurrijk 2–1, while defeating PEC Zwolle 2–1, and drawing equal with HFC Haarlem 1–1, and FC Volendam 3–3. The final match against Ajax was lost 5–2.

During his tenure with Robinhood, he helped the team win National titles in 1979, 1980, 1981, 1983, 1984, 1985, 1986, 1987, 1988, 1989, and was the league top scorer in 1984, 1987, 1988, 1989. His last top scorer award was shared with Maikal Peel with both finishing as joint top scorers that season. He immigrated to the Netherlands in 1990 and is remembered as one of the greatest footballers in the country's history.

=== Real Sranang ===
After relocating to Amsterdam, Netherlands, Rigters played for Real Sranang in the Vierde Klasse of amateur football in the Netherlands for one season, playing on a team with the likes of Errol Emanuelson, Guno Zorgvol, Ronald Amelo, Jules Polanen and Ryan Bindraba, all former players in Suriname, before he eventually retired from the sport.

== International career ==
Rigters played for the Suriname national team for almost the entirety of his professional career, except for a period in 1978 when he was not called up by Dutch manager Rob Groener. He played his first major International tournament in 1977 in Mexico for the country's 1978 FIFA World Cup qualifying campaign. He made his debut for the first team on 14 November 1976 in a 1–1 draw against Trinidad and Tobago at the National Stadion in Paramaribo. He scored his first goal for the national team on 18 September 1977 against Trinidad and Tobago, scoring the opener in a 2–1 win at home. He also played in the 1986 FIFA World Cup qualifying campaign, as well as in the 1979 CFU Championship, and the 1990 Caribbean Cup qualification.

== Career statistics ==
=== International goals ===
Scores and results list Suriname' goal tally first.

| Goal | Date | Venue | Opponent | Score | Result | Competition |
|---|---|---|---|---|---|---|
| 1. | 18 September 1977 | National Stadion, Paramaribo, Suriname | Trinidad and Tobago | 1–0 | 2–1 | 1978 FIFA World Cup qualification |
| 2. | 8 October 1977 | Estadio Universitario, Monterrey, Mexico | Guatemala | 2–0 | 2–3 | 1978 FIFA World Cup qualification |
| 3. | 15 November 1979 | National Stadion, Paramaribo, Suriname | Trinidad and Tobago | 1–0 | 3–0 | 1979 CFU Championship |
| 4. | 6 March 1985 | Tiburcio Carías Andino, Tegucigalpa, Honduras | Honduras | 1–2 | 1–2 | 1986 FIFA World Cup qualification |
| 5. | 29 April 1990 | André Kamperveen Stadion, Paramaribo, Suriname | Guyana | 4–0 | 5–0 | 1990 Caribbean Cup qualification |

== Honours ==
=== Club ===
MVV

- SVB Eerste Klasse (1): 1976

S.V. Robinhood

- SVB Hoofdklasse (10): 1979, 1980, 1981, 1983, 1984, 1985, 1986, 1987, 1988, 1989
- CONCACAF Champions' Cup Runners-up (3): 1977, 1982, 1983

=== Individual ===
- SVB Hoofdklasse Top Goalscorer (4): 1984, 1987, 1988, 1989
