= 2017–18 Reading F.C. season =

Reading
2017–18 season
- Manager: Jaap Stam (until 21 March 2018); Paul Clement (from 23 March 2018)
- Stadium: Madejski Stadium
- Championship: 20th
- FA Cup: Fourth round (eliminated by Sheffield Wednesday)
- EFL Cup: Third round (eliminated by Swansea City)
- Top goalscorer: League: Modou Barrow (10); All: Modou Barrow; Jón Daði Böðvarsson (10)
- Highest home attendance: 21,771 vs Burton Albion (26 December 2017)
- Lowest home attendance: 4,986 vs Stevenage (16 January 2018)
- Average home league attendance: 15,181
Home colours	Away colours

The 2017–18 season was Reading's 147th year in existence and fifth consecutive season in the Championship, and covers the period from 1 July 2017 to 30 June 2018.

== Season review ==
=== Pre-season ===
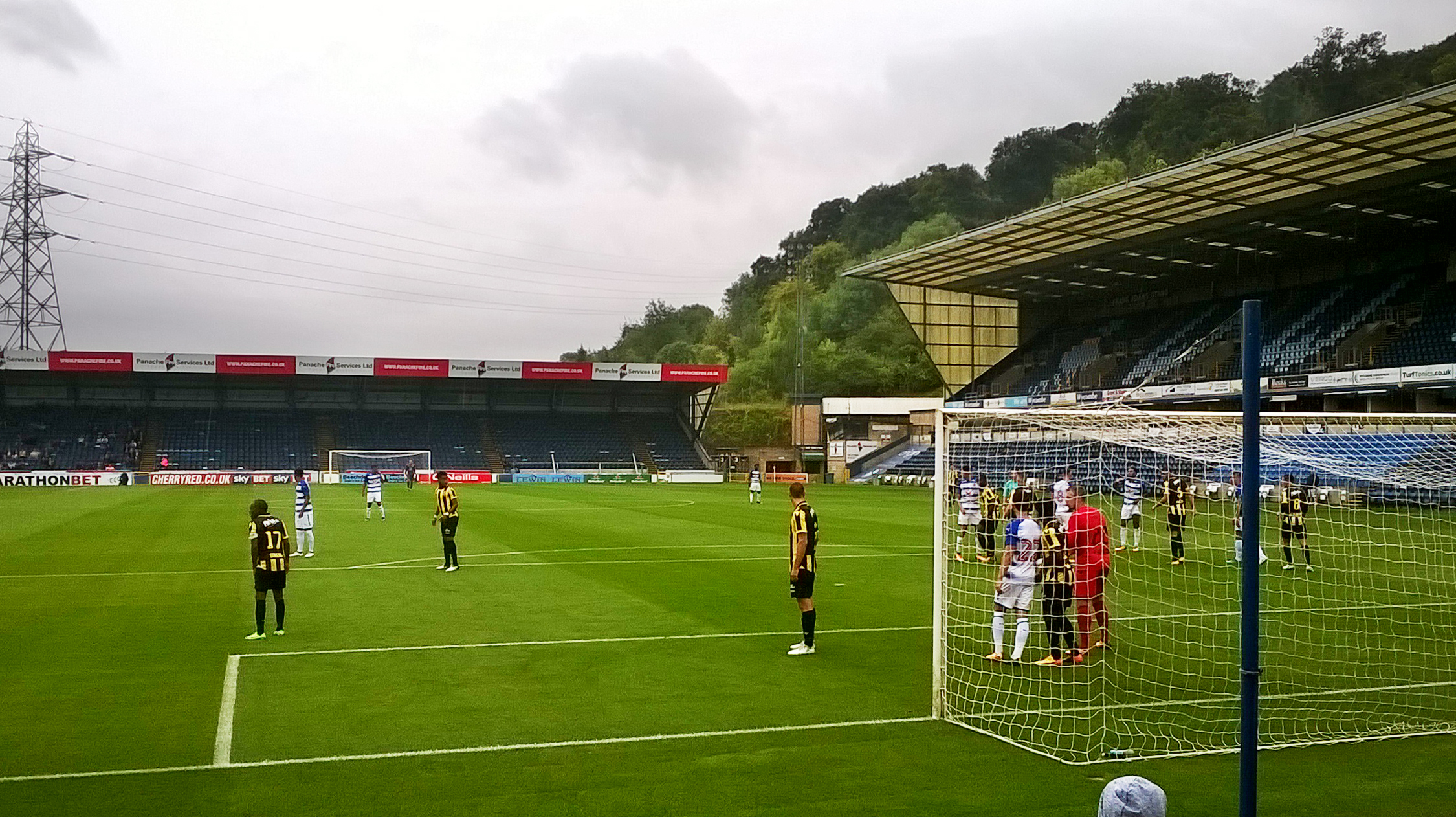
Reading hosted KNVB Cup winners SBV Vitesse in a friendly at Adams Park on 29 July 2017

On 31 May, Reading announced that they would be returning to the Netherlands for a 10-day training camp. On 6 June, Reading announced that they would host two behind-doors friendlies with QPR at the club's Hogwood Park training facility, with the fixtures taking place on 8 July.

On 16 June 2017, Reading were given a home tie against League One side Gillingham in the EFL Cup first-round draw. In the following days, it was announced that the match would take place on 8 August.

For the second year in a row, Reading accepted the invitation to enter their Category One academy into the EFL Trophy.

On 4 July 2017, manager Jaap Stam signed a new two-year contract with Reading, keeping him at the club until 2019. The club's assistant manager, Andries Ulderink, and first team coach, Said Bakkati, also signed new deals to extend their stay. Chief Executive Nigel Howe was elected to the EFL Board on the same day. The following day, defender Chris Gunter committed his future to the club by signing a new three-year contract extension.

On 6 July, Reading announced that whilst they are in the Netherlands on their pre-season tour, they will play in friendlies against K.V. Kortrijk, of the Belgian top flight, and Turkish Süper Lig club Gençlerbirliği on 15 July, and Dutch Eredivisie team Sparta Rotterdam and Belgian second tier side Cercle Brugge on 22 July. The same day, Liam Kelly joined Stam and Gunter by extending his contract until 2020; youngsters Sam Smith, Ryan East, Jake Sheppard, Lewis Ward and Andy Rinomhota all agreed new deal; Liam Driscoll, Ben House, Joel Rollinson and Ade Shokunbi moved unto the U-23s from the U18's whilst Ethan Coleman, Tom Holmes and Kosta Sparta signed professional deals.

On 27 July, Steven Reid left the club to pursue new coaching opportunities and challenges.

On 29 July, Reading hosted KNVB Cup winners SBV Vitesse in a friendly match at Wycombe Wanderers' Adams Park. The venue was chosen due to the renovation of the pitch at the Madejski Stadium. The match, which was Reading's only pre-season friendly to take place in front of spectators in the UK, saw Reading lose 3–2.

On 31 July, John Swift signed a new five-year contract with Reading, keeping him at the club until 2022, whilst Liam Moore signed a new four-year deal on 2 August.

==== Transfers ====
Following the conclusion of the 2016–17 regular season, Reading announced on 16 May 2016 that they would not be renewing the contracts of Aaron Kuhl, Harrison Bennett, Stuart Moore, Joe Tupper, Terence Vancooten, Sean Long, Craig Tanner, Jack Denton and Harry Cardwell. Long went on to sign for Lincoln City on 18 May, whilst Dominic Hyam agreed to join Coventry City on 24 May.

On 19 June, Tarique Fosu moved permanently to Charlton Athletic after turning down a new contract at Reading.

On 26 June, Reading announced that two academy players would be leaving the club. Zak Jules had turned down a new contract with the club and had signed for Shrewsbury Town, while Jack Stacey had moved to Luton Town on a permanent deal. Additionally, two players left the club on loan on the same day. Deniss Rakels completed his move to Lech Poznań for the season and Jonathan Bond transferred to Peterborough United until 3 January 2018. On 28 June, Reading announced their first signing of the summer, Pelle Clement on a three-year contract from AFC Ajax.

On 1 July, Niall Keown moved to Partick Thistle for an undisclosed fee, rejoining the club he spent the second half of the previous season at. The following day, Reading announced that Andrija Novakovich had signed a new 2-year contract with the club and that he would spend the 2017–18 season on loan at Eerste Divisie side SC Telstar. On 4 July, Danzell Gravenberch moved to K.S.V. Roeselare on a season-long loan deal.

The contract of Danny Williams was not extended, despite a contract offer being made by Reading. He was officially released by the club on 1 July, signing for Premier League newcomers Huddersfield Town four days later.

Yakou Méïte signed a season-long loan deal with Sochaux on 8 July.

Reading completed their second signing of the summer on 14 July, Jón Daði Böðvarsson signing on a three-year contract from Wolverhampton Wanderers. Two days later, Saudi club Al-Hilal confirmed the signing of Ali Al-Habsi on a three-year contract, with Reading confirming the move on 17 July. Academy graduate Dominic Samuel left the club on 19 July, signing a three-year deal with Blackburn Rovers for an undisclosed fee, whilst Vito Mannone joined the club on a three-year contract from Sunderland for £2,000,000. Paolo Hurtado left the club on 20 July, having played 6 times for the Royals in his two-year spell, returning to Vitória de Guimarães on a permanent deal for an undisclosed fee.

Reading announced that Jake Cooper had signed for Millwall on a permanent deal on 28 July 2017. On 1 August, Robert Dickie joined Lincoln City on loan until January 2018, whilst Lewis Ward moved to Hungerford Town on loan until the end of February 2018.

Modou Barrow became Reading's fourth summer signing on 3 August, signing a four-year deal, before young goalkeeper Luke Southwood joined Bath City on a six-month loan deal the next day. On 11 August, youngsters Cameron Green and Conor Davis joined Basingstoke Town on an initial one-month loan, with Leandro Bacuna became Reading's fifth summer arrival, signing a four-year deal, on 13 August. Reading transfer dealings then went quiet for two weeks before announced the signing of David Edwards on a two-year contract from Wolverhampton Wanderers on 26 August.

Three days later, 29 August, Reading signed Sone Aluko to a four-year contract, moving from Fulham for an undisclosed fee, with Sandro Wieser joining K.S.V. Roeselare on a season-long load deal on 31 August, transfer deadline day.

=== August ===
Reading started the season, on 5 August, with a 0–2 away defeat to Queens Park Rangers, Conor Washington gave QPR the lead in the 22nd minute before doubling his, and QPR's, goals on from the penalty spot on the 59th minute after Tiago Ilori earned a red card for the challenge on Pawel Wszolek. Three days later Reading faced Gillingham in the first round of the EFL Cup, winning 2–0 thanks to two Liam Kelly goals. Andy Rinomhota and Sam Smith made their debuts for Reading from the start whilst Axel Andrésson also made his debut, coming on as a second-half substitute. Reading's first home league game came on 12 August against Fulham, where Tomáš Kalas was shown a straight red card in the 1st minute for pulling back Modou Barrow. Liam Kelly then gave Reading the lead in the 61st minute with his third goal of the season, before former Reading player Lucas Piazon equalised in the 82nd minute to give Fulham the draw. Reading followed up their first point of the season with a trip to Aston Villa on 15 August. The game finished 2–1 to Reading with the lead coming after an Adrian Popa cross deflected off Glenn Whelan into his own net in the 49th minute. Modou Barrow extended Readings lead 6 minutes later with his first goal for the club, before Conor Hourihane pulled a goal back late on. Reading suffered their second defeat of the season away to Preston North End on 19 August, with the only goal of the game being scored by Jordan Hugill in the 22nd minute. Reading got back to winning ways on 22 August, with a 3–1 extra time victory over Millwall in the Second Round of the EFL Cup. Shane Ferguson cancelled out Leandro Bacuna's first goal for the club, before George Evans scored on the stroke of half time in extra and Sam Smith scored his first goal for Reading with 4 minutes to go. Reading traveled to St Andrew's on 26 August to face Birmingham City, with goals from Jón Daði Böðvarsson and George Evans securing the three-points. On 30 August, Reading announced that Jordan Obita had signed a new three-year contract with the club, and that skipper Paul McShane extending his contract until 2019.

On 31 August Reading's home game against Barnsley, due to take place on 12 September, was postponed as Barnsley's Second Round EFL Cup match against Derby County was moved to the same date.

=== September ===
At the start of September Young keeper Liam Driscoll joined Staines Town on loan. Readings first game of September took place on the 9th, with Bristol City visiting the Madejski Stadium and leaving with a 1–0 win after Aden Flint scored an 84th-minute winner for the visitors. On 8 September, Reading confirmed that their home game against Barnsley, originally scheduled for 12 September, had been re-arranged for 28 November. Readings next game was on 16 September, away to Brentford. Brentford took the lead in the 16th minute through Josh Clarke before Liam Moore was fouled in the box and Liam Kelly slotted the equaliser in from the spot to earn Reading a point. On 19 September Reading hosted Swansea City in the Third round of the EFL Cup. After a goalless first half Alfie Mawson broke the deadlock with near post header from a corner in the 52nd minute before a George Evans pass struck the referee, Andy Davies in the centre circle, with ball breaking to Swansea and Jordan Ayew finishing the move off to see Swansea City win 2–0 and advance into the next round. On 23 September Reading hosted Hull City, after a first half Fraizer Campbell goal for the visitors, substitute Jón Daði Böðvarsson scored in the 87th minute to give both teams a point. Reading lost to Millwall on the 26th at The Den. Dave Edwards gave Reading the lead in the 73rd minute with his first goal for the club, before George Saville scored twice in the last 10 minutes to give the hosts all three points. On 27 September, Joey van den Berg extended his contract with Reading until the summer of 2019. On 30 September, Reading hosted Norwich City in a live Sky Sports game. Norwich took the lead through James Maddison in the 10th minute, with Liam Moore equalising a few minutes later to leave the teams level at half time. Early in the second half Cameron Jerome scored the winner for Norwich with Marley Watkins being sentoff for a dangerous tackle on Chris Gunter in stoppage time.

=== October ===
Reading started October with an away trip to Leeds United, on 14 October. Reading took the lead through former Leeds loanee Modou Barrow in the 84th minute, before Vito Mannone saved a 91st minute Pablo Hernández penalty to give Reading the win. The following Saturday, 21st, Reading faced Sheffield United at Bramall Lane. The Blades went 2–0 up before halftime with goals from Paul Coutts and Billy Sharp, before Roy Beerens gave Reading hope of a point with a late consolation goal to end the game 2–1 to Sheffield United. Middlesbrough were the visitors to the Madejski Stadium on 28 October, and ran out 2–0 winners over Reading thanks to a Grant Leadbitter first half penalty and Britt Assombalonga early in the second half. Reading's last game of October was a home game against Nottingham Forest on 31 October. John Swift gave Reading the lead in the 10th minute before scoring his, and Reading's second midway through the second half. Sone Aluko scored his first Reading goal in the 78th minute to give Reading a 3–0 lead, before Ben Osborn scored a late consolation goal for Nottingham Forest in the final 5 minutes, leaving Reading 3–1 winners.

=== November ===
On 1 November, Reading announced that Yann Kermorgant had put off his retirement plans at the end of the season to sign a new contract with the club until the summer of 2019. Three days later Reading traveled to Pride Park to face Derby. Reading took a 2–0 half time lead after goals from Liam Moore and Sone Aluko inside the first 15 minutes. Roy Beerens extended the lead to 3–0 just before the hour mark, with Johnny Russell pulling one back for Derby in the 71st minute. Modou Barrow scored his third goal for Reading 4 minutes later to restore Readings 3 goal advantage with Chris Martin scoring Derbys second in injury time to leave Reading taking all 3 points. On 9 November, Lewis Ward returned to Reading from his loan deal with Hungerford Town earl as an unconfirmed higher league club had made an inquiry into taking him on loan, joining Aldershot Town on loan until 3 January the following day. After the international break, Reading hosted Wolverhampton Wanderers on 18 November, with the visitors running out 2–0 winners thanks to goals from Ivan Cavaleiro and Matt Doherty. Readings 17th game of the season was a midweek fixture away to Bolton Wanderers on 21 November. The home side took a 2–0 lead with goals from Reece Burke and Darren Pratley inside the first 25 minutes, whilst Reading also lost John Swift to injury. In the second half Reading pulled two goals back in the last 15 minutes, from Liam Moore and a Leandro Bacuna penalty, to end the game 2–2. On 24 November, Conor Davis joined Gosport Borough on loan, with Reading following up their draw away at Bolton with a home draw against Sheffield Wednesday the following day, 25 November, leaving them 18th in the table. On 28 November Reading hosted Barnsley in their re-arranged home game from 12 September, first half goals from Dave Edwards, and a Joey van den Berg screamer gave Reading a 2–0 half time lead. In the second-half substitute Jón Daði Böðvarsson came on and rounded off the scoring to give Reading a 3–0 win that lifted them into 16th position in the league. On 30 November, Reading announced that Omar Richards had signed a new deal with club until 2021.

=== December ===
Reading started December with a 3–1 away victory over Sunderland on 2 December. The game saw Callum McManaman sent off for two yellow cards before half time, before goals from David Edwards and two from Modou Barrow saw Reading take a 3–0 lead before former Royals loanee Lewis Grabban scored a late penalty. On 4 December, Reading were drawn away to Stevenage in the Third Round of the FA Cup. On 6 December, Axel Andrésson joined Torquay United on a one-month youth loan deal until 6 January 2018. Two days later, Andy Rinomhota signed a new contract with Reading until the summer of 2021. Reading's second game of December was a home match against Cardiff City, originally scheduled for 15:00hrs on 9 December, the game was moved to 20:00hrs on 11 December so it could be shown on Sky Sports. Reading took a 2–0 lead going into half time, thanks to an own goal from Callum Paterson and Modou Barrow's third goal of the month, with former Reading defender Sean Morrison also going off injured. With less than 10 minutes to go Neil Warnock was sent-off for Cardiff City, before goals from Joe Bennett and Lee Tomlin rescued a point for the visitors. On 16 December, Ipswich Town scored two first half goal, through Callum Connolly and Joe Garner, at Portman Road to inflict Readings ninth defeat of the season. On 21 December, Josh Barrett signed a new contract with Reading, until the summer of 2021, whilst also agreeing to join EFL League Two side Coventry City on loan 1 January 2018, until the end of the season. On 23 December, Reading hosted Burton Albion in a 1–2 defeat which saw Burton Albion take the lead through Tom Flanagan in the 40th minute. Modou Barrow equalised for Reading in the 76th minute before Tom Naylor scored the winner for Burton in the 81st minute. Reading lost their third game in a row on 26 December, away to Bristol City, with both Bristol goals coming in the second half, from Jamie Paterson in the 68th minute and Lloyd Kelly in 93rd minute. On 30 December, Jake Sheppard joined Guiseley on loan for the remainder of the season. Reading's last game of 2017 was away to Barnsley in a game that ended 1–1 after Ethan Pinnock scored a stoppage time equaliser for the home side to rule out a second half Yann Kermorgant strike.

=== January ===
On 2 January, Reading hosted Birmingham City in a game that ended 0–2 to the visitors, with the goals coming from Jacques Maghoma and Sam Gallagher. On 5 January, Academy Manager Lee Heron left the club explore new opportunities. Reading traveled to Stevenage on 6 January for their FA Cup third-round match, with the match ending 0–0, forcing a reply at the Madejski Stadium on 16 January.

Reading drew 0–0 away at Hull City on 13 January, before winning 3–0 against Stevenage in their Third round reply thanks to a Jón Daði Böðvarsson hattrick. Following Reading's 3–0 victory over Stevenage, their away match against Burton Albion was rearranged to 30 January due to it now clashing with the clubs FA Cup fourth-round match against Sheffield Wednesday. Reading suffered their defeat in their next Championship fixture, a 0–1 home defeat against Brentford on 20 January, with Lasse Vibe scoring the goal.

Reading were knocked out of the 2017–18 FA Cup on 26 January, losing 3–1 to Sheffield Wednesday at Hillsborough. Sheffield Wednesday took a 3–0 lead thanks to two goals from Atdhe Nuhiu and one from George Boyd before Cameron Dawson turned into his own net to give Reading a consolation goal. Reading's first league victory in eight games came on 30 January, in their rearranged fixture against Burton Albion from 27 January. Reading traveled to Burton Albion's Pirelli Stadium where two goals from Jón Daði Böðvarsson and one from Chris Gunter secured the points for the Royals, with Lucas Akins scoring a penalty for the hosts.

==== Transfers ====
On 3 January, goalkeepers Jonathan Bond and Luke Southwood both extended their respective loan deals with, Peterborough United and Bath City, until the end of the season, whilst with youngsters Gabriel Osho and Thomas McIntyre signing new contracts, until the summer of 2020, on the same day. The next day, 4 January, Lewis Ward extended his loan deal with Aldershot Town until 4 March, whilst Robert Dickie moved to Oxford United on a permanent transfer for an undisclosed fee. On 17 January, Reading confirmed that Deniss Rakels' loan deal with Lech Poznań had ended, and that Rakels had joined Cracovia on loan for the remainder of the season. Two days later, 19 January, Ade Shokunbi joined Nuneaton Town on a youth-loan until 17 February. On 29 January, Adrian Popa joined Al-Taawoun on loan for the remainder of the season, whilst Tommy Elphick joined the club on loan for the remainder of the season from Aston Villa. On transfer deadline day, 31 January, Chris Martin joined the club on loan until the end of the season, whilst George Legg joined Barnet on loan for the remainder of the season and Roy Beerens joined Vitesse permanently.

=== February ===
On 1 February, Tennai Watson signed a new contract until the summer 2021, with Sam Smith follow suit by also signing a new contract until 2021. On 3 February Reading hosted Millwall, losing 0–2 after an own goal from Leandro Bacuna in the 70th minute followed by a second goal 3 minutes later from Lee Gregory. On 5 February, Reading announced that Former Premier League EPPP chief, Ged Roddy MBE, had been appointed as the club's new academy manager. Reading traveled to Middlesbrough on 10 February, losing 2–1 to goal either side of halftime from Adama Traoré and a consolation goal from loanee Chris Martin whilst Britt Assombalonga also missed a late penalty for the hosts. On 20 February, Reading traveled to the City Ground to face Nottingham Forest, taking the lead through Omar Richards in the 35th minute before Lee Tomlin equalised in the 84th minute to share the points between the two teams. On 23 February, U23 captain Gabriel Osho joined Maidenhead United on a one-month youth loan deal. The following day, 24 February, Reading hosted Derby County in a six-goal thriller. Derby County took the lead in the 6th minute through Kasey Palmer before Liam Kelly equalised 10 minutes later. Modou Barrow gave Reading the lead in the 32nd minute with Richard Keogh level the game three minutes later to seeing the game in to half time at 2–2. Tom Lawrence regained the lead for Derby County in the first minute of the second half, with the final equaliser coming in the 80th minute from Jón Daði Böðvarsson before Chris Baird was shown a red card late on for rash challenge on Barrow. On 27 February, Jake Sheppard returned from his loan deal at Guiseley, before Reading suffered defeat to Sheffield United at home later in the evening. Billy Sharp gave the visitors the lead in the 11th minute, with Mark Duffy extending the lead in the 44th, giving Sheffield United a 2–0 half time lead. Omar Richards scored his second of the season early in the second half to reduce the deficit, before Leandro Bacuna missed a 62nd-minute penalty and Billy Sharp scored his second of the game, and Sheffield United's third, a minute later to wrap up the points.

=== March ===
Reading's first scheduled game was due to be played on 3 March against Wolverhampton Wanderers at Molineux, however the game was postponed on the morning of the 3rd due to adverse weather conditions leaving the pitch unplayable, with the match being rescheduled for 13 March. On 7 March, Lewis Ward extended his loan deal with Aldershot Town until the end of the season. On 6 March Reading hosted Bolton Wanderers in a 1–1 draw which saw former Royal Adam Le Fondre equalise for Bolton on half time to cancel out an earlier Modou Barrow strike. Reading drew their fourth game in five on, coming from behind to draw 2–2 with Leeds United at the Madejski Stadium on 10 March. Jón Daði Böðvarsson put Reading ahead in the 16th minute before Pontus Jansson and Pablo Hernández either side of halftime gave Leeds a 2–1 lead, before an Eunan O'Kane own goal gave both sides a point. On 12 March, Jake Sheppard joined Wealdstone on loan until the end of the season.

Reading's rearranged match away to Wolverhampton Wanderers took place on 13 March, Matt Doherty scoring either side of Benik Afobe to give Wolverhampton Wanderers a 3–0 win. On 15 March, Reading announced that goalkeeper Liam Driscoll and forward Ben House had signed new contract with club until the summer of 2020.

Reading traveled to Norwich City on 17 March, losing 3–2 after being 3–1 down at half time. Mario Vrančić opened the scoring for Norwich in the 14th minute, before Grant Hanley extended it in the 26th with Liam Kelly pulling a goal back in the 32nd minute. Anssi Jaakkola brought down James Maddison in the 36th, with Maddison picking himself up to slot away the penalty to make it 3–1 at halftime. Sam Smith finished of the scoring in the 51st minute to end the game 3–2 to Norwich. On 21 March, manager Jaap Stam left the club with immediate effect. The following day, 22 March, youth goalkeeper Jökull Andrésson joined Camberley Town on loan. Reading announced the appointment of Paul Clement as the club's new manager on 23 March. Reading hosted Queens Park Rangers for Paul Clement's first match in charge of Reading. An early Sone Aluko goal proved to be the difference with second-half substitute Yann Kermorgant being sentoff in the 81st minute for two yellow cards.

=== April ===
Reading traveled to Aston Villa on 3 April in a game that they lost 3–0. Midfielder David Edwards was given a first half red card after picking up two bookings in the first 30 minutes of the game. Shortly after half time Birkir Bjarnason broke the deadlock with Conor Hourihane and Scott Hogan adding to the tally later in the game. Reading won their second game under Paul Clement on 7 April, a 1–0 victory over Preston North End thanks to a first half strike by Modou Barrow. Reading traveled to Fulham on 10 April, suffering a 1–0 defeat after Stefan Johansen scored in the 25th minute and Leandro Bacuna was sentoff in the 93rd minute, Readings third red card in four games. 14 April saw Reading host Sunderland at the Madejski Stadium, taking the lead through a Liam Kelly penalty in the 20th minute. After halftime, Paddy McNair and Lee Cattermole scored to give Sunderland the lead before substitute Yann Kermorgant came on and scored to grab a point for Reading. Readings penultimate away trip of the season was to Hillsborough to face Sheffield Wednesday on 21 April. Sheffield Wednesday took the lead in the 34th minute through Fernando Forestieri, before George Boyd extended the lead in the 52nd. Forestieri grabbed his second goal of the match and Wednesdays third in the 73rd minute before Tyler Blackett was sentoff for Reading in the 76th minute and the game ended 3–0 to Sheffield Wednesday.

Reading suffered their heaviest defeat of the season in their last home game of the season, a 4–0 defeat by Ipswich Town on 28 April. Ipswich Town's goals came courtesy of Martyn Waghorn in the 71st minute, Jordan Spence in the 79th, Freddie Sears in the 91st and Callum Connolly in the 94th.

=== May ===
Reading's final game of the season was away to Cardiff City on 5 May, with the hosts needing to equal or better Fulhams result away to Birmingham City and Reading needing a draw to survive relegation. The match ended 0–0 resulting in Reading finishing the season in 20th place, 3 points of relegation, with 44 Points and Cardiff being promoted to the Premier League as runners-up.

On 11 May 2018, Reading announced that they had exercised a third-year option clause in Anssi Jaakkola's contract, keeping the goalkeeper at the club until the summer of 2019. Whilst they had also offered contracts to U23 goalkeepers Luke Southwood and Lewis Ward and second year scholars Akin Odimayo, Jamal Balogun and Andre Burley with Moroyin Omolabi, Cameron Green, Jazz Wallace and Jack Nolan all accepting professional contracts with the club. On the same day Reading announced that Stephen Quinn, Joseph Mendes, Jonathan Bond, Deniss Rakels, Conor Davis, Jake Sheppard, Gabriel Rosario, Kosta Sparta, Harry Philby, Jack Buchanan, Leon Okuboyejo and Joseph Wilson will all leave the club at the end of contracts.

On 17 May, Reading announced their first signing of the 2018–19 season, Andy Yiadom signed a four-year contract with Reading, officially joining his new club on 1 July after the expiration of his Barnsley contract.

=== June ===
On 1 June 2018, Sandro Wieser was released by mutual consent.

== Transfers ==
=== In ===
Date	Position	Nationality	Name	From	Fee	Ref.
28 June 2017	MF	(Netherlands)	Pelle Clement	AFC Ajax	Undisclosed	
14 July 2017	FW	(Iceland)	Jón Daði Böðvarsson	Wolverhampton Wanderers	Undisclosed	
19 July 2017	GK	(Italy)	Vito Mannone	Sunderland	Undisclosed	
3 August 2017	FW	(The Gambia)	Modou Barrow	Swansea City	Undisclosed	
13 August 2017	MF	(Curaçao)	Leandro Bacuna	Aston Villa	Undisclosed	
26 August 2017	MF	(Wales)	David Edwards	Wolverhampton Wanderers	Undisclosed	
29 August 2017	FW	(Nigeria)	Sone Aluko	Fulham	Undisclosed	

=== Out ===
Date	Position	Nationality	Name	To	Fee	Ref.
26 June 2017	MF	(England)	Jack Stacey	Luton Town	Undisclosed	
1 July 2017	DF	(Republic of Ireland)	Niall Keown	Partick Thistle	Undisclosed	
16 July 2017	GK	(Oman)	Ali Al-Habsi	Al-Hilal	Undisclosed	
19 July 2017	FW	(England)	Dominic Samuel	Blackburn Rovers	Undisclosed	
20 July 2017	MF	(Peru)	Paolo Hurtado	Vitória de Guimarães	Undisclosed	
28 July 2017	DF	(England)	Jake Cooper	Millwall	Undisclosed	
4 January 2018	DF	(England)	Robert Dickie	Oxford United	Undisclosed	
31 January 2018	MF	(Netherlands)	Roy Beerens	Vitesse	Undisclosed	

=== Loans in ===
Date from	Position	Nationality	Name	From	Date to	Ref.
29 January 2018	DF	(England)	Tommy Elphick	Aston Villa	End of season	
31 January 2018	FW	(Scotland)	Chris Martin	Derby County	End of season	

=== Loans out ===
Date from	Position	Nationality	Name	To	Date to	Ref.
26 June 2017	FW	(Latvia)	Deniss Rakels	Lech Poznań	17 January 2018	
26 June 2017	GK	(England)	Jonathan Bond	Peterborough United	End of season	
2 July 2017	FW	(United States)	Andrija Novakovich	Telstar	Season-Long	
4 July 2017	DF	(Netherlands)	Danzell Gravenberch	Roeselare	Season-Long	
7 July 2017	FW	(Ivory Coast)	Yakou Méïte	Sochaux	Season-Long	
1 August 2017	GK	(England)	Robert Dickie	Lincoln City	January 2018	
1 August 2017	GK	(England)	Lewis Ward	Hungerford Town	9 November 2017	
4 August 2017	GK	(England)	Luke Southwood	Bath City	End of season	
11 August 2017	MF	(England)	Cameron Green	Basingstoke Town	11 September 2017	
11 August 2017	FW	(Republic of Ireland)	Conor Davis	Basingstoke Town	11 September 2017	
31 August 2017	MF	(Liechtenstein)	Sandro Wieser	Roeselare	Season-Long	
11 September 2017	GK	(Australia)	Liam Driscoll	Staines Town	16 December 2017	
10 November 2017	GK	(England)	Lewis Ward	Aldershot Town	4 March 2018	
24 November 2017	FW	(Republic of Ireland)	Conor Davis	Gosport Borough		
6 December 2017	DF	(Iceland)	Axel Andrésson	Torquay United	6 January 2018	
16 December 2017	GK	(United States)	Gabe Rosario	Staines Town	28 December 2017	
21 December 2017 †	MF	(Republic of Ireland)	Josh Barrett	Coventry City	End of season	
30 December 2017	DF	(Scotland)	Jake Sheppard	Guiseley	27 February 2018	
17 January 2018	FW	(Latvia)	Deniss Rakels	Cracovia	End of season	
19 January 2018	MF	(England)	Ade Shokunbi	Nuneaton Town	17 February 2018	
27 January 2018	MF	(Romania)	Adrian Popa	Al-Taawoun	End of season	
31 January 2018	GK	(England)	George Legg	Barnet	End of season	
23 February 2018	DF	(England)	Gabriel Osho	Maidenhead United	24 March 2018	
13 March 2018	DF	(Scotland)	Jake Sheppard	Wealdstone	End of season	
22 March 2018	GK	(Iceland)	Jökull Andrésson	Camberley Town	End of season	

† Barrett's move was announced on the above date, but was not active until 1 January 2018.

=== Released ===
Date	Position	Nationality	Name	Joined	Date	Ref.
1 June 2018	MF	(Liechtenstein)	Sandro Wieser	FC Vaduz	12 June 2018	
30 June 2018	GK	(England)	Jonathan Bond	West Bromwich Albion	16 July 2018	
30 June 2018	GK	(United States)	Gabriel Rosario	Huddersfield Town	4 July 2018	
30 June 2018	DF	(England)	Harry Philby	Basingstoke Town	10 August 2018	
30 June 2018	DF	(England)	Joseph Wilson	Fleet Town		
30 June 2018	DF	(Scotland)	Jake Sheppard	Wealdstone	1 July 2018	
30 June 2018	MF	(Australia)	Kosta Sparta	AFC Wimbledon	1 July 2018	
30 June 2018	MF	(England)	Jack Buchanan			
30 June 2018	MF	(Republic of Ireland)	Stephen Quinn	Burton Albion	22 August 2018	
30 June 2018	FW	(France)	Joseph Mendes	AC Ajaccio	2 July 2018	
30 June 2018	FW	(Republic of Ireland)	Conor Davis	University College Dublin	30 July 2018	
30 June 2018	FW	(Latvia)	Deniss Rakels	Pafos	16 July 2018	

== Squad ==
As of match played 6 May 2018

No.	Name	Nationality	Position	Date of birth (Age (Note: Age as of the end of the season))	Signed from	Signed in	Contract ends	Apps.	Goals
Goalkeepers
1	Vito Mannone	(Italy)	GK	2 March 1988 (aged 30)	Sunderland	2017	2020	41	0
31	Anssi Jaakkola	(Finland)	GK	13 March 1987 (aged 31)	Ajax Cape Town	2016	2019	14	0
40	Liam Driscoll	(Australia)	GK	8 May 1999 (aged 18)	Academy	2017	2020	0	0
43	George Legg	(England)	GK	30 April 1996 (aged 22)	Academy	2015		0	0
44	Lewis Ward	(England)	GK	5 March 1997 (aged 21)	Academy	2015		0	0
	Luke Southwood (Note: Luke Southwood was born in Oxford, England, representing England at U20 level before going on to make his international debut for Northern Ireland in March 2022.)	(England)	GK	6 December 1997 (aged 20)	Academy	2016		0	0
	Jonathan Bond	(England)	GK	19 May 1993 (aged 24)	Watford	2015	2018	14	0
Defenders
2	Chris Gunter	(Wales)	DF	21 July 1989 (aged 28)	Nottingham Forest	2012	2020	270	4
3	Tommy Elphick	(England)	DF	7 September 1987 (aged 30)	loan from Aston Villa	2018	2018	4	0
5	Paul McShane	(Republic of Ireland)	DF	6 January 1986 (aged 32)	Hull City	2015	2019	98	4
6	Liam Moore (Note: Liam Moore was born in Loughborough, England, but qualified to represent Jamaica, and made his international debut for Jamaica in March 2021.)	(England)	DF	31 January 1993 (aged 25)	Leicester City	2016	2021	96	4
11	Jordan Obita (Note: Obita was born in Oxford, England, but qualified to represent Uganda and made his international debut for Uganda in June 2025.)	(England)	DF	8 December 1993 (aged 24)	Academy	2010	2020	165	4
20	Tiago Ilori (Note: Tiago Ilori was born in Hampstead, England, but qualified to represent Portugal through his mother, representing Portugal at U18, U19, U20, U21 and U23 level.)	(Portugal)	DF	26 February 1993 (aged 25)	Liverpool	2017	2020	42	0
24	Tyler Blackett	(England)	DF	2 April 1994 (aged 24)	Manchester United	2016	2019	68	0
28	Danzell Gravenberch	(Netherlands)	DF	13 February 1994 (aged 24)	Dordrecht	2016	2019	5	0
30	Tennai Watson	(England)	DF	4 March 1997 (aged 21)	Academy	2015	2021	7	0
37	Axel Andrésson	(Iceland)	DF	27 January 1998 (aged 20)	Academy	2016		2	0
46	Teddy Howe	(England)	DF	9 October 1998 (aged 19)	Academy	2017		0	0
48	Ramarni Medford-Smith	(England)	DF	21 October 1998 (aged 19)	Academy	2017		0	0
49	Gabriel Osho (Note: Osho was born in Reading, England, but qualified to represent Nigeria and made his international debut for Nigeria in November 2024.)	(England)	DF	14 August 1997 (aged 20)	Academy	2016	2020	0	0
50	Omar Richards	(England)	DF	15 February 1998 (aged 20)	Academy	2016	2021	16	2
57	Tom Holmes	(England)	DF	12 March 2000 (aged 18)	Academy	2017		1	0
59	Tom McIntyre (Note: Tom McIntyre was born in Reading, England, but qualified to represent Scotland, representing them at U17, U20 and U21 level.)	(Scotland)	DF	6 November 1998 (aged 19)	Academy	2016	2020	0	0
Midfielders
4	Joey van den Berg	(Netherlands)	MF	13 February 1986 (aged 32)	SC Heerenveen	2016	2019	68	2
8	George Evans	(England)	MF	13 December 1994 (aged 23)	Manchester City	2016	2019	72	4
10	John Swift	(England)	MF	23 June 1995 (aged 22)	Chelsea	2016	2022	68	11
12	Garath McCleary (Note: Garath McCleary was born in Oxford, England, but qualified to represent Jamaica and made his international debut for Jamaica in February 2013.)	(Jamaica)	MF	15 May 1987 (aged 30)	Nottingham Forest	2012	2020	214	26
15	Callum Harriott (Note: Callum Harriott was born in Norbury, England, but qualified to represent Guyana, making his international debut for Guyana in March 2019.)	(England)	MF	4 March 1994 (aged 24)	Charlton Athletic	2016	2019	16	3
16	David Edwards	(Wales)	MF	3 February 1986 (aged 32)	Wolverhampton Wanderers	2017	2019	35	3
19	Leandro Bacuna (Note: Leandro Bacuna was born in Groningen, Netherlands, but qualified to represent Curaçao and made his international debut for Curaçao in March 2016. He previously represented Netherlands Antilles at U20 level and Netherlands at U19 and U21 level.)	(Curaçao)	MF	21 August 1991 (aged 26)	Aston Villa	2017	2021	38	2
21	Stephen Quinn	(Republic of Ireland)	MF	1 April 1986 (aged 32)	Hull City	2015	2018	45	2
22	Pelle Clement	(Netherlands)	MF	19 May 1996 (aged 21)	AFC Ajax	2017	2020	28	0
25	Adrian Popa	(Romania)	MF	24 July 1988 (aged 29)	Steaua București	2017	2020	16	1
35	Jake Sheppard	(Scotland)	MF	30 May 1997 (aged 20)	Academy	2015	2018	0	0
38	Liam Kelly (Note: Liam Kelly was born in Basingstoke, England, but qualified to represent the Republic of Ireland through his parents, representing the Republic of Ireland at U19 and U21 level.)	(Republic of Ireland)	MF	22 November 1995 (aged 22)	Academy	2014	2020	72	8
39	Josh Barrett (Note: Josh Barrett was born in Oxford, England, but qualified to represent the Republic of Ireland through his parents, representing the Republic of Ireland at U16, U17, U19 and U21 level.)	(Republic of Ireland)	MF	21 June 1998 (aged 19)	Academy	2015	2021	4	0
41	Ryan East	(England)	MF	7 August 1998 (aged 19)	Academy	2016		0	0
42	Andy Rinomhota (Note: Rinomhota was born in Leeds, England, but qualified to represent Zimbabwe and made his international debut for Zimbabwe in November 2023.)	(England)	MF	21 April 1997 (aged 21)	Academy	2017	2021	2	0
51	Tyler Frost	(England)	MF	7 August 1999 (aged 18)	Academy	2017		0	0
52	Joel Rollinson	(Australia)	MF	16 November 1998 (aged 19)	Academy	2017		0	0
54	Ade Shokunbi	(England)	MF	17 December 1998 (aged 19)	Academy	2017		0	0
58	Jordan Holsgrove	(Scotland)	MF	10 September 1999 (aged 18)	Academy	2017		0	0
	Sandro Wieser	(Liechtenstein)	MF	3 February 1993 (aged 25)	Thun	2016	2019	0	0
Forwards
9	Joseph Mendes (Note: Mendes was born in Évreux, France, but qualified to represent Guinea-Bissau and made his international debut for Guinea-Bissau in June 2019.)	(France)	FW	30 March 1991 (aged 27)	Le Havre	2016	2018	20	3
14	Sone Aluko (Note: Sone Aluko was born in Hounslow, England, but qualified to represent Nigeria and made his international debut for Nigeria in May 2009. He previously represented Nigeria at U20 and U23 level and England at U16, U17, U18 and U19 level.)	(Nigeria)	FW	19 February 1989 (aged 29)	Fulham	2017	2021	40	3
17	Modou Barrow	(The Gambia)	FW	13 October 1992 (aged 25)	Swansea City	2017	2021	45	10
18	Yann Kermorgant	(France)	FW	8 November 1981 (aged 36)	Bournemouth	2016	2019	92	24
23	Jón Daði Böðvarsson	(Iceland)	FW	25 May 1992 (aged 25)	Wolverhampton Wanderers	2017	2020	36	10
27	Chris Martin (Note: Martin was born in Beccles, England, but qualified to represent Scotland and made his international debut for Scotland in May 2014.)	(Scotland)	FW	4 November 1988 (aged 29)	Derby County	2018	2018	10	1
36	Andrija Novakovich	(United States)	FW	21 September 1996 (aged 21)	University School of Milwaukee	2014	2019	2	0
45	Ben House (Note: House was born in Guildford, England, but qualified to represent Scotland, and made his debut for Scotland U20 in March 2019.)	(England)	FW	5 July 1999 (aged 18)	Academy	2017	2020	0	0
55	Sam Smith	(England)	FW	8 March 1998 (aged 20)	Academy	2016	2021	11	2
56	Danny Loader (Note: Loader was born in Reading, England, but qualified to represent Cameroon, and made his international debut for Cameroon in March 2025 having previously represented England various youth level.)	(England)	FW	28 August 2000 (aged 17)	Academy	2016		1	0
59	Conor Davis	(Republic of Ireland)	FW	3 June 1998 (aged 19)	Academy	2016	2018	0	0
	Yakou Méïté (Note: Yakou Méïte was born in Paris, France, but qualified to represent the Ivory Coast, representing the Ivory Coast at U17, U20 and U23 level.)	(Ivory Coast)	FW	11 February 1996 (aged 22)	Paris Saint-Germain	2016	2019	15	1
	Deniss Rakels	(Latvia)	FW	20 August 1992 (aged 25)	KS Cracovia	2016	2018	17	3
Left during the season
1	Ali Al-Habsi	(Oman)	GK	30 December 1981 (aged 34)	Wigan Athletic	2015	2019	91	0
3	Jake Cooper	(England)	DF	3 February 1995 (aged 21)	Academy	2013	2018	54	4
7	Roy Beerens	(Netherlands)	MF	22 December 1987 (aged 28)	Hertha BSC	2016	2019	63	9
14	Dominic Samuel	(England)	FW	1 April 1994 (aged 22)	Academy	2012	2018	16	2
34	Niall Keown (Note: Keown was born in Oxford, England, but also qualified to represent Republic of Ireland and Northern Ireland through his grandparents. Keown made his debut for Republic of Ireland U21 in 2016.)	(Republic of Ireland)	DF	5 April 1995 (aged 21)	Academy	2013	2018	2	0
37	Jack Stacey	(England)	MF	6 April 1996 (aged 20)	Academy	2014	2019	6	0
	Robert Dickie	(England)	DF	3 March 1996 (aged 20)	Academy	2014		1	0
	Paolo Hurtado	(Peru)	MF	27 July 1990 (aged 25)	Paços de Ferreira	2015	2018	6	0

== Friendlies ==
8 July 2017 Friendly	Reading	2–1	Queens Park Rangers	Wokingham
12:00 BST	Beerens 19'; East 39'	Report	Washington 40' (pen.)	Stadium: Hogwood Park; Attendance: Behind Closed Doors

8 July 2017 Friendly	Reading	5–2	Queens Park Rangers	Wokingham
14:30 BST	Loader 8', 26', 39', 54'; Popa 14'	Report	Grego-Cox 86'; C.Owens 90'	Stadium: Hogwood Park; Attendance: Behind Closed Doors

15 July 2017 Friendly	K.V. Kortrijk	1–0	Reading	Oosterbeek, Netherlands
14:00 BST	Ouali 60'	Report		Attendance: Behind Closed Doors

15 July 2017 Friendly	Gençlerbirliği	2–2	Reading	Oosterbeek, Netherlands
17:30 BST	Milinkovic 7', 85'	Report	Popa 83'; Beerens 90+5'	Attendance: Behind Closed Doors

22 July 2017 Friendly	Sparta Rotterdam	0–0	Reading	Oosterbeek, Netherlands
10:00 BST				Attendance: Behind Closed Doors

22 July 2017 Friendly	Cercle Brugge	1–1	Reading	Oosterbeek, Netherlands
12:30 BST	G.Tormin 28'		Obita 52'	Attendance: Behind Closed Doors

29 July 2017 Friendly	Reading	2–3	Vitesse	High Wycombe
15:00 BST	Swift 63' (pen.); Popa 71'	Report	Linssen 14'; Matavž 31', 51'	Stadium: Adams Park; Attendance: 1,894; Referee: Mr D Whitestone

=== Under 23s ===
11 July 2017 Friendly	Reading U23	5–1	Kingstonian	Wokingham
18:30 BST		Report		Stadium: Hogwood Park; Attendance: Behind Closed Doors

15 July 2017 Friendly	Reading U23	1–2	Hungerford Town	Wokingham
13:00 BST	Goal		Williams; R.Tyler	Stadium: Hogwood Park; Attendance: Behind Closed Doors

18 July 2017 Friendly	Bath City	3–1	Reading U23	Bath
19:30 BST	L.Capoue 82'; Lucas 88'; R.Misso 90'	Report	C.Regis 28'	Stadium: Twerton Park

22 July 2017 Friendly	Wealdstone	6–1	Reading U23	Ruislip
15:00 BST				Stadium: Grosvenor Vale

29 July 2017 Friendly	Braintree Town	2–0	Reading U23	Braintree
15:00 BST	S.McLoughlin 50'; B.Crook 82' (pen.)			Stadium: Cressing Road

5 August 2017 Friendly	Reading U23	0–0	Bournemouth U23	Wokingham
15:00 BST				Stadium: Hogwood Park

14 November 2017 Friendly	Reading U23	1–3	Brentford B	Wokingham
13:00 GMT (UTC)	Barrett 11'	Report	Macleod 16'; Alves 49'; Assibey-Mensah 84'	Stadium: Hogwood Park

21 January 2018 Friendly	Brentford B	9–1	Reading U23	Osterley
13:00 GMT (UTC)	Judge 10'; Macleod 12' 52'; Marcondes 17' 45'; Field 63' 64'; Westbrooke 85'; Cole 90'	Report	Popa 90'	Stadium: Jersey Road

24 January 2018 Friendly	Reading U23	3–2	Brentford B	Wokingham
13:00 GMT (UTC)	15' (pen.); 31'; 60'	Report	Clayton 9' Archibald 68'	Stadium: Hogwood Park

== Competitions ==
=== Championship ===
==== League table ====
Pos	Team	Pld	W	D	L	GF	GA	GD	Pts	Promotion, qualification or relegation
18	Hull City	46	11	16	19	70	70	0	49	
19	Birmingham City	46	13	7	26	38	68	−30	46	
20	Reading	46	10	14	22	48	70	−22	44	
21	Bolton Wanderers	46	10	13	23	39	74	−35	43	
22	Barnsley (R)	46	9	14	23	48	72	−24	41	Relegation to EFL League One

Source: English Football League
Rules for classification: 1) Points; 2) Goal difference; 3) Number of goals scored
(R) Relegated

==== Results summary ====
Overall								Home						Away					
Pld	W	D	L	GF	GA	GD	Pts	W	D	L	GF	GA	GD	W	D	L	GF	GA	GD
46	10	14	22	48	70	−22	44	5	8	10	25	35	−10	5	6	12	23	35	−12

Last updated: 12 May 2018.
Source: #Results

==== Results by matchday ====
Round	1	2	3	4	5	6	7	8	9	10	11	12	13	14	15	16	17	18	19	20	21	22	23	24	25	26	27	28	29	30	31	32	33	34	35	36	37	38	39	40	41	42	43	44	45	46
Ground	A	H	H	A	A	H	A	H	A	H	A	A	H	H	A	H	A	H	H	A	H	A	H	A	A	H	A	H	A	H	A	A	H	H	H	H	A	A	H	A	H	A	H	A	H	A
Result	L	D	W	L	W	L	D	D	L	L	W	L	L	W	W	L	D	D	W	W	D	L	L	L	D	L	D	L	W	L	L	D	D	L	D	D	L	L	W	L	W	L	D	L	L	D
Position	24	20	14	18	11	16	18	18	18	20	20	20	20	20	18	19	19	18	16	14	14	14	14	17	17	18	18	18	18	18	18	18	18	18	18	19	19	20	19	19	19	19	19	19	19	20

Updated to match(es) played on 6 May 2018. Source: 11v11.com
A = Away; H = Home; W = Win; D = Draw; L = Loss

==== Results ====
5 August 2017 1	Queens Park Rangers	2–0	Reading	Shepherd's Bush, London
15:00 BST (UTC+1)	Washington 22', 59' (pen.); Lynch (yellow card) 57'	Report	Ilori (red card) 56'; Barrow (yellow card) 90+1'	Stadium: Loftus Road; Attendance: 14,460; Referee: Scott Duncan

12 August 2017 2	Reading	1–1	Fulham	Reading
15:00 BST (UTC+1)	Kelly 61'; Moore (yellow card) 70'; Ilori (yellow card) 71'; Swift (yellow card) 73'	Report	Kalas (red card) 1'; Piazon 82'; Kamara (yellow card) 90+4'	Stadium: Madejski Stadium; Attendance: 17,398; Referee: Simon Hooper

15 August 2017 3	Reading	2–1	Aston Villa	Reading
20:00 BST (UTC+1)	Moore (yellow card) 36'; Whelan 49' (o.g.); Barrow 55'; McCleary (yellow card) 90'	Report	Green (yellow card) 27'; Hourihane (yellow card) 37' (goal) 87'	Stadium: Madejski Stadium; Attendance: 20,144; Referee: Kevin Friend

19 August 2017 4	Preston North End	1–0	Reading	Preston
15:00 BST (UTC+1)	Pearson (yellow card) 12'; Hugill 22'; Fisher (yellow card) 38'	Report	Moore (yellow card) 19'; Evans (yellow card) 45+1'; Gunter (yellow card) 90+1'	Stadium: Deepdale; Attendance: 11,174; Referee: Andy Madley

26 August 2017 5	Birmingham City	0–2	Reading	Birmingham
15:00 BST (UTC+1)		Report	Böðvarsson 60'; Evans 85'	Stadium: St Andrew's; Attendance: 19,993; Referee: Steve Martin

9 September 2017 6	Reading	0–1	Bristol City	Reading
15:00 BST (UTC+1)	van den Berg (yellow card) 32'	Report	Baker (yellow card) 41'; Flint 84'	Stadium: Madejski Stadium; Attendance: 18,650; Referee: James Linington

12 September 2017 7	Reading	v	Barnsley	Reading
20:00 BST (UTC+1)				Stadium: Madejski Stadium
Note: Match postponed on 31 August, due to Barnsley's Second Round EFL Cup match against Derby County being moved to the same date, with the game re-arranged to 28 November.

16 September 2017 8	Brentford	1–1	Reading	Brentford
15:00 BST (UTC+1)	Clarke 16'; Maupay (yellow card) 72'	Report	McShane (yellow card) 5'; McCleary (yellow card) 25'; Edwards (yellow card) 24'; Kelly 70' (pen.); Obita (yellow card) 81'	Stadium: Griffin Park; Attendance: 9,739; Referee: Tony Harrington

23 September 2017 9	Reading	1–1	Hull City	Reading
15:00 BST (UTC+1)	Böðvarsson 87'	Report	Campbell 28'	Stadium: Madejski Stadium; Attendance: 15,749; Referee: Steve Martin

26 September 2017 10	Millwall	2–1	Reading	Bermondsey
19:45 BST (UTC+1)	Saville 80', 85'; Wallace (yellow card) 87'	Report	Edwards 73'	Stadium: The Den; Attendance: 10,399; Referee: Andy Madley

30 September 2017 11	Reading	1–2	Norwich City	Reading
17:30 BST (UTC+1)	Bacuna (yellow card) 6'; Moore 13' (yellow card) 60'; Beerens (yellow card) 63' van den Berg (yellow card) 66'	Report	Maddison 10'; Jerome 52'; Reed (yellow card) 78'; Watkins (red card) 90+2'	Stadium: Madejski Stadium; Attendance: 14,226; Referee: Tim Robinson

14 October 2017 12	Leeds United	0–1	Reading	Leeds
15:00 BST (UTC+1)	Sáiz (yellow card) 29'; O'Kane (yellow card) 35'; Berardi (yellow card) 59'; Hernández (yellow card) 85' (penalty missed) 90+1'; Ayling (yellow card) 86'	Report	van den Berg (yellow card) 53'; Barrow 84' (yellow card) 85'	Stadium: Elland Road; Attendance: 33,900; Referee: Jeremy Simpson

21 October 2017 13	Sheffield United	2–1	Reading	Sheffield
15:00 BST	Coutts 19'; Sharp 37'; Brooks (yellow card) 90+3'	Report	van den Berg (yellow card) 56'; McShane (yellow card) 57'; Beerens 85'	Stadium: Bramall Lane; Attendance: 26,265; Referee: David Coote

28 October 2017 14	Reading	0–2	Middlesbrough	Reading
15:00 BST (UTC+1)	McShane (yellow card) 45+1'	Report	Leadbitter 14' (pen.); Assombalonga (yellow card) 49' (goal) 74'	Stadium: Madejski Stadium; Attendance: 17,928; Referee: Oliver Langford

31 October 2017 15	Reading	3–1	Nottingham Forest	Reading
20:00 GMT (UTC)	Swift 13', 70'; Aluko 78'	Report	Lichaj (yellow card) 9'; Osborn 86'	Stadium: Madejski Stadium; Attendance: 14,868; Referee: Paul Tierney

4 November 2017 16	Derby County	2–4	Reading	Derby
15:00 GMT (UTC)	Winnall (yellow card) 23'; Nugent (yellow card) 60'; Russell 71'; Johnson (yellow card) 81'; Martin (yellow card) 84' (goal) 90+1'	Report	Moore 9'; Aluko 13'; Gunter (yellow card) 32'; Beerens 54'; Barrow (yellow card) 67' (goal) 75'; Mannone (yellow card) 84'	Stadium: Pride Park Stadium; Attendance: 25,938; Referee: Keith Stroud

18 November 2017 17	Reading	0–2	Wolverhampton Wanderers	Reading
15:00 GMT (UTC)	Bacuna (yellow card) 20' van den Berg (yellow card) 56'	Report	Cavaleiro 16'; Doherty (yellow card) 59' (goal) 88'; Bennett (yellow card) 64'	Stadium: Madejski Stadium; Attendance: 20,708; Referee: Roger East

21 November 2017 18	Bolton Wanderers	2–2	Reading	Horwich
20:00 GMT (UTC)	Robinson (yellow card) 14'; Burke 18'; Pratley 23'; Madine (yellow card) 81'	Report	Moore 76'; Bacuna 83' (pen.)	Stadium: Macron Stadium; Attendance: 13,113; Referee: Andrew Madley

25 November 2017 19	Reading	0–0	Sheffield Wednesday	Reading
15:00 GMT (UTC)		Report	Loovens (yellow card) 24'	Stadium: Madejski Stadium; Attendance: 18,382; Referee: David Coote

28 November 2017 7	Reading	3–0	Barnsley	Reading
20:00 GMT (UTC)	Edwards 20' van den Berg 29'; Böðvarsson 88'	Report	Williams (yellow card) 83'	Stadium: Madejski Stadium; Attendance: 13,317; Referee: Darren Bond
Note: Match original scheduled for 12 September.

2 December 2017 20	Sunderland	1–3	Reading	Sunderland
15:00 GMT (UTC)	McManaman (yellow card) 15' (yellow-red card) 45+3'; Cattermole (yellow card) 35'; Oviedo (yellow card) 43'; Grabban 76' (pen.)	Report	McShane (yellow card) 16'; Aluko (yellow card) 43'; Edwards 53'; Barrow 68', 71'	Stadium: Stadium of Light; Attendance: 27,386; Referee: Keith Stroud

11 December 2017 21	Reading	2–2	Cardiff City	Reading
20:00 GMT (UTC)	Paterson 16' (o.g.); Barrow 41'; Kelly (yellow card) 51'; Bacuna (yellow card) 87'	Report	Bogle (yellow card) 33'; Bennett 83'; Tomlin 90+1'	Stadium: Madejski Stadium; Attendance: 16,670; Referee: Steve Martin
Note: Match originally scheduled for 15:00 on 9 December, but rearranged for Sky Sports.

16 December 2017 22	Ipswich Town	2–0	Reading	Ipswich
15:00 GMT (UTC)	Connolly 3'; Garner 27'; Waghorn (yellow card) 34'; Knudsen (yellow card) 69'; Webster (yellow card) 88'	Report	Barrow (yellow card) 8'; Bacuna (yellow card) 9'; McShane (yellow card) 52'; Edwards (yellow card) 66'	Stadium: Portman Road; Attendance: 13,832; Referee: Peter Bankes

23 December 2017 23	Reading	1–2	Burton Albion	Reading
15:00 GMT (UTC)	Barrow 76'	Report	Flanagan 40'; Murphy (yellow card) 55'; Naylor 81'	Stadium: Madejski Stadium; Attendance: 21,771; Referee: John Brooks

26 December 2017 24	Bristol City	2–0	Reading	Bristol
15:00 GMT (UTC)	Baker (yellow card) 31'; Pack (yellow card) 38'; Paterson 68'; Woodrow (yellow card) 82'; Kelly 90+3'	Report	Aluko (yellow card) 30'; Bacuna (yellow card) 72'	Stadium: Ashton Gate Stadium; Attendance: 23,116; Referee: Oliver Langford

30 December 2017 25	Barnsley	1–1	Reading	Barnsley
15:00 GMT (UTC)	Pinnock 90+1'	Report	Kermorgant 68'; Aluko (yellow card) 82'	Stadium: Oakwell; Attendance: 11,945; Referee: Simon Hooper

2 January 2018 26	Reading	0–2	Birmingham City	Reading
20:00 GMT (UTC)	Swift (yellow card) 85'	Report	Maghoma 24'; Gallagher 64'	Stadium: Madejski Stadium; Attendance: 14,491; Referee: James Linington

13 January 2018 27	Hull City	0–0	Reading	Kingston upon Hull
15:00 GMT (UTC)	Larsson (yellow card) 89'	Report		Stadium: KCOM Stadium; Attendance: 14,300; Referee: Darren England

20 January 2018 28	Reading	0–1	Brentford	Reading
15:00 GMT (UTC)	van den Berg (yellow card) 10'; Gunter (yellow card) 45+1'; Evans (yellow card) 90+4'	Report	Watkins (yellow card) 60'; Vibe 74'; Woods (yellow card) 84'; Bjelland (yellow card) 85'; Canós (yellow card) 86'	Stadium: Madejski Stadium; Attendance: 17,893; Referee: Darren Bond

30 January 2018 29	Burton Albion	1–3	Reading	Burton upon Trent
19:45 GMT (UTC)	Turner (yellow card) 29'; Buxton (yellow card) 38'; Akins 51' (pen.); McFadzean (yellow card) 86'	Report	Böðvarsson 20', 68' (yellow card) 68'; Moore (yellow card) 27'; Gunter 57'; Ilori (yellow card) 70'	Stadium: Pirelli Stadium; Attendance: 2,750; Referee: Robert Jones
Note: Match rearranged from 27 January 2017 due to Reading's FA Cup fourth-round tie against Sheffield Wednesday.

3 February 2018 30	Reading	0–2	Millwall	Reading
15:00 GMT (UTC)	Ilori (yellow card) 18'; Edwards (yellow card) 83'; Bacuna (yellow card) 84'	Report	McLaughlin (yellow card) 41'; Wallace (yellow card) 55'; Bacuna 70' (o.g.); Gregory 73'; Cooper (yellow card) 78'	Stadium: Madejski Stadium; Attendance: 17,282; Referee: Geoff Eltringham

10 February 2018 31	Middlesbrough	2–1	Reading	Middlesbrough
15:00 GMT (UTC)	Traoré 44', 49'; Friend (yellow card) 73'; Assombalonga (penalty missed) 85'; Clayton (yellow card) 88'	Report	van den Berg (yellow card) 60'; Martin 78'; Gunter (yellow card) 83'; Bacuna (yellow card) 87'	Stadium: Riverside Stadium; Attendance: 23,491; Referee: David Coote

17 February 2018 32	Reading	v	Sheffield United	Reading
15:00 GMT (UTC)		[BBC Report] [Reading Report]		Stadium: Madejski Stadium
Note: Games moved to 27 February, due to Sheffield United's FA Cup fifth-round match against Leicester City

20 February 2018 33	Nottingham Forest	1–1	Reading	West Bridgford
19:45 GMT (UTC)	Osborn (yellow card) 62'; Tomlin (yellow card) 74' (goal) 84'; Figueiredo (yellow card) 77'	Report	Richards 35' (yellow card) 76'; Kelly (yellow card) 37'; Gunter (yellow card) 78'	Stadium: City Ground; Attendance: 21,846; Referee: Stephen Martin

24 February 2018 34	Reading	3–3	Derby County	Reading
15:00 GMT (UTC)	Kelly 16'; Barrow 32'; Richards (yellow card) 49'; Böðvarsson 80'; Moore (yellow card) 83'	Report	Palmer 6' (yellow card) 50'; Olsson (yellow card) 20'; Keogh 35' (yellow card) 83'; Lawrence 46'; Weimann (yellow card) 83'; Baird (red card) 85'; Carson (yellow card) 86'	Stadium: Madejski Stadium; Attendance: 17,647; Referee: Tony Harrington

27 February 2018 32	Reading	1–3	Sheffield United	Reading
20:00 GMT (UTC)	Richards 51' van den Berg (yellow card) 57'; Bacuna (penalty missed) 62'; Mannone (yellow card) 64'; Clement (yellow card) 70'	Report	Sharp 11', 63'; Duffy 44'; Basham (yellow card) 50'; Donaldson (yellow card) 83'	Stadium: Madejski Stadium; Attendance: Andy Davies; Referee: 6,769
Note: Games moved from 17 February, due to Sheffield United's FA Cup fifth-round match against Leicester City

3 March 2018 35	Wolverhampton Wanderers	v	Reading	Wolverhampton
17:30 GMT (UTC)				Stadium: Molineux Stadium
Note: Match postponed on match day, due to adverse weather conditions rendering the pitch unplayable.

6 March 2018 36	Reading	1–1	Bolton Wanderers	Reading
20:00 GMT (UTC)	Barrow 32' (yellow card) 33'; Edwards (yellow card) 64'; Evans (yellow card) 81'	Report	Le Fondre 45'; Buckley (yellow card) 57'; Flanagan (yellow card) 89'; Henry (yellow card) 90+1'	Stadium: Madejski Stadium; Attendance: 8,631; Referee: James Linington

10 March 2018 37	Reading	2–2	Leeds United	Reading
15:00 GMT (UTC)	Böðvarsson 16'; Evans (yellow card) 24'; Kelly (yellow card) 31'; O'Kane 58' (o.g.)	Report	Jansson 43'; Pennington (yellow card) 48'; Hernández 56'	Stadium: Madejski Stadium; Attendance: 19,770; Referee: Scott Duncan

13 March 2018 35	Wolverhampton Wanderers	3–0	Reading	Wolverhampton
19:45 GMT (UTC)	Doherty 40', 73'; Afobe 58'; Bennett (yellow card) 85'	Report	Gunter (yellow card) 51'; Evans (yellow card) 54'	Stadium: Molineux Stadium; Attendance: 27,341; Referee: Robert Jones
Note: Match originally scheduled for 3 March 2018, but postponed due to adverse weather conditions rendering the pitch unplayable.

17 March 2018 38	Norwich City	3–2	Reading	Norwich
15:00 GMT (UTC)	Vrančić 14'; Hanley 26' (yellow card) 62'; Hernández (yellow card) 25'; Maddison 37' (pen.)	Report	Kelly 32'; Jaakkola (yellow card) 36'; Clement (yellow card) 45'; Smith 51'; Barrow (yellow card) 70'; Blackett (yellow card) 73'; Kermorgant (yellow card) 89'	Stadium: Carrow Road; Attendance: 25,098; Referee: Oliver Langford

30 March 2018 39	Reading	1–0	Queens Park Rangers	Reading
17:30 BST (UTC+1)	Aluko 13', (yellow card) 90'; Martin (yellow card) 21'; Kermorgant (yellow card) 70' (yellow-red card) 81'	Report	Bidwell (yellow card) 57'; Freeman (yellow card) 69'; Lynch (yellow card) 82'	Stadium: Madejski Stadium; Attendance: 20,273; Referee: David Coote

3 April 2018 40	Aston Villa	3–0	Reading	Birmingham
19:45 BST (UTC+1)	Bjarnason 46'; Hourihane 63'; Hogan 70'	Report	Edwards (yellow card) 17' (yellow-red card) 30'	Stadium: Villa Park; Attendance: 29,223; Referee: Darren Bond

7 April 2018 41	Reading	1–0	Preston North End	Reading
15:00 BST (UTC+1)	Barrow 12'; Bacuna (yellow card) 17'; Swift (yellow card) 60'	Report	Davies (yellow card) 11'; Fisher (yellow card) 27'	Stadium: Madejski Stadium; Attendance: 15,501; Referee: Andy Madley

10 April 2018 42	Fulham	1–0	Reading	Fulham
19:45 BST (UTC+1)	Johansen 25'; Targett (yellow card) 60'	Report	Richards (yellow card) 33'; Bacuna (red card) 90+3'	Stadium: Craven Cottage; Attendance: 19,272; Referee: Lee Mason

14 April 2018 43	Reading	2–2	Sunderland	Reading
15:00 BST (UTC+1)	Kelly 20' (pen.); Kermorgant 79'; Swift (yellow card) 85'	Report	McNair 47'; Cattermole 66'; Love (yellow card) 90+4'	Stadium: Madejski Stadium; Attendance: 17,348; Referee: Steve Martin

21 April 2018 44	Sheffield Wednesday	3–0	Reading	Sheffield
15:00 BST (UTC+1)	Forestieri 34', 73'; Boyd 52'	Report	Blackett (red card) 76'	Stadium: Hillsborough Stadium; Attendance: 24,373; Referee: Jeremy Simpson

28 April 2018 45	Reading	0–4	Ipswich Town	Reading
15:00 BST (UTC+1)		Report	Waghorn 71'; Spence 79'; Sears 90+1'; Connolly 90+3'	Stadium: Madejski Stadium; Attendance: 17,683; Referee: Keith Stroud

6 May 2018 46	Cardiff City	0–0	Reading	Cardiff
12:30 BST (UTC+1)	Hoilett (yellow card) 58'	Report	Elphick (yellow card) 27'; Kermorgant (yellow card) 74'	Stadium: Cardiff City Stadium; Attendance: 32,478; Referee: Bobby Madley

=== EFL Cup ===
8 August 2017 First round	Reading	2–0	Gillingham	Reading
20:00 BST	Kelly 71', 86'	Report	Cundle (yellow card) 39'	Stadium: Madejski Stadium; Attendance: 5,936; Referee: Brett Huxtable

22 August 2017 Second round	Reading	3–1 (a.e.t.)	Millwall	Reading
20:00 BST	Bacuna 34'; Evans 105'; Smith 116'	Report	Ferguson 37'	Stadium: Madejski Stadium; Attendance: 7,148; Referee: Charles Breakspear

19 September 2017 Third round	Reading	0–2	Swansea City	Reading
20:00 BST	Bacuna (yellow card) 42'	Report	Fer (yellow card) HT; Mawson 52'; Olsson (yellow card) 56'; Ayew 83'	Stadium: Madejski Stadium; Attendance: 8,729; Referee: Andy Davies

=== FA Cup ===
6 January 2018 Third Round	Stevenage	0–0	Reading	Stevenage
15:00 GMT (UTC)	Newton (yellow card) 37'; Pett (yellow card) 90+3'	Report	Richards (yellow card) 56'; Bacuna (yellow card) 78'	Stadium: Broadhall Way; Attendance: 3,877; Referee: Ben Toner

16 January 2018 Third Round Replay	Reading	3–0	Stevenage	Reading
20:00 GMT (UTC)	Böðvarsson 32', 44', 64'	Report	Newton (yellow card) 40'	Stadium: Madejski Stadium; Attendance: 4,986; Referee: Tim Robinson

26 January 2018 Fourth round	Sheffield Wednesday	3–1	Reading	Sheffield
19:45 GMT (UTC)	Pelupessy (yellow card) 6'; Matias (yellow card) 16'; Nuhiu 29', 53'; Boyd 62'	Report	Ilori (yellow card) 84'; Dawson 87' (o.g.)	Stadium: Hillsborough Stadium; Attendance: 14,848; Referee: John Brooks

=== Professional U23 Development League ===
==== Table ====
Pos	Team	Pld	W	D	L	GF	GA	GD	Pts	Promotion or qualification
1	Blackburn Rovers U23s (P)	22	15	4	3	47	20	+27	49	Promotion to Division 1
2	Aston Villa U23s	22	14	1	7	51	29	+22	43	Qualification for Play-offs
3	Brighton & Hove Albion U23s (P)	22	11	7	4	46	25	+21	40	Qualification for Play-offs
4	Middlesbrough U23s	22	11	4	7	41	36	+5	37	Qualification for Play-offs
5	Reading U23s	22	10	4	8	38	44	−6	34	Qualification for Play-offs
6	Southampton U23s	22	10	3	9	41	37	+4	33	
7	Fulham U23s	22	9	3	10	38	37	+1	30	
8	Norwich City U23s	22	8	6	8	32	33	−1	30	
9	Wolverhampton Wanderers U23s	22	8	4	10	30	41	−11	28	
10	Newcastle United U23s	22	6	3	13	29	45	−16	21	
11	Stoke City U23s	22	6	2	14	31	46	−15	20	
12	West Bromwich Albion U23s	22	2	3	17	21	52	−31	9	

Updated to match(es) played on 12 May 2018. Source:
(P) Promoted

==== Results ====
14 August 2017 1	Southampton U23	4–0	Reading U23	Southampton
19:00 BST	T.Johnson 15' (yellow card) 45'; J.Afolabi 25', 60'; G.Osho 52' (o.g.); A.Little (yellow card) 70'	Report	Loader (yellow card) 45+2'; East (yellow card) 63'	Stadium: St Mary's Stadium; Attendance: 761; Referee: Savvas Yianni

18 August 2017 2	Reading U23	3–5	Blackburn Rovers U23	Finchampstead
13:00 BST	R.Medford-Smith 10'; Loader (yellow card) 17' (goal) 26' (pen.); Smith (yellow card) 59'; M.Platt 87' (o.g.)	Report	Nuttall 3' (pen.), 6' (pen.) (yellow card) 28'; J.Rankin-Costello 23'; W.Tomlinson (yellow card) 33'; C.Doyle (yellow card) 36'; S.Mols 45'; M.Platt 72'; L.Hardcastle (yellow card) 81'; J.Doyle (yellow card) 90'	Stadium: Hogwood Park; Attendance: 83; Referee: Chris Pollard

25 August 2017 3	Brighton & Hove Albion U23	1–2	Reading U23	Falmer
19:00 BST	M.Sanders (yellow card) 29'; G.Cox (yellow card) 47'; Tilley (yellow card) 54'; Alzate 56'	Report	Barrett 13' (yellow card) 33'; T.Howe (yellow card) 88'; J.Holsgrove 90'	Stadium: Falmer Stadium; Attendance: 243; Referee: Chris O'Donnell

11 September 2017 4	Reading U23	2–1	Fulham U23	High Wycombe
19:00 BST	Smith 25', 56'; Rinomhota (yellow card) 48'	Report	E.Adebayo 49'; Edun (yellow card) 82'	Stadium: Adams Park; Attendance: 247

18 September 2017 5	Wolverhampton Wanderers U23	1–2	Reading U23	Wolverhampton
19:00 BST	Collins 56'; S.Seedorf (yellow card) 78'; C.Herc (yellow card) 90+4'; Xavier (yellow card) 90+5'	Report	Loader 8', 69'; G.Osho (yellow card) 19'; Barrett (yellow card) 90+4'	Stadium: Molineux Stadium; Referee: Joe Hull

25 September 2017 6	Reading U23	2–2	Norwich City U23	Finchampstead
13:00 BST	Smith 3', 29'; T.Holmes (yellow card) 23'; Loader (yellow card) 43'; Axel Andrésson (yellow card) 63' (yellow-red card) 89'; J.Sheppard (yellow card) 70'; R.Medford-Smith (yellow card) 90'	Report	S.Mourgos 41'; O.Odusina (yellow card) 55'; T.Cantwell 89' (pen.)	Stadium: Hogwood Park; Attendance: 93; Referee: Samuel Allison

15 October 2017 7	Middlesbrough U23	3–4	Reading U23	Middlesbrough
13:00 BST	Miller 64'; Tavernier 73' (red card) 90+3'; B.Liddle (yellow card) 78'; Wing 86'	Report	House 3', 28'; J.Holsgrove (yellow card) 16'; Barrett 58'; G.Legg (yellow card) 76'; East 81'	Stadium: Riverside Stadium; Attendance: 274; Referee: Ryan Johnson

23 October 2017 8	Reading U23	3–2	Aston Villa U23	Reading
19:00 BST	Barrett 9', 55' (yellow card) 90+4'; House 23'; R.Medford-Smith (yellow card) 77'; T.Howe (yellow card) 90+2'; East (yellow card) 90+5'	Report	O'Hare 7'; McKirdy (yellow card) 28' (goal) 49'; Grealish (yellow card) 45+2'; M.Clark (yellow card) 75'; J.Doyle-Hayes (yellow card) 90+6'	Stadium: Madejski Stadium; Attendance: 473; Referee: Daniel Middleton

30 October 2017 9	West Bromwich Albion U23	0–2	Reading U23	Kidderminster
19:00 GMT	K.Jameson (yellow card) 69'	Report	Barrett 21'; J.Holsgrove 25'; A.Burley (yellow card) 30'; J.Sheppard (yellow card) 60'	Stadium: Aggborough Stadium; Attendance: 156; Referee: Peter Gibbons

20 November 2017 10	Newcastle United U23	4–1	Reading U23	Newcastle upon Tyne
19:00 GMT	G.Osho 20' (o.g.); J.Yarney (yellow card) 35'; Heardman (penalty missed) 57'; L.Charman 79', 90+2'; Roberts 84'	Report	Barrett 28'; G.Osho (red card) 57'; House (yellow card) 59'; R.Medford-Smith (yellow card) 78'	Stadium: Whitley Park; Attendance: 208; Referee: Ryan Johnson

26 November 2017 11	Stoke City U23	2–3	Reading U23	Burton upon Trent
14:00 GMT	T.Campbell 59'; Ngoy (yellow card) 61'; Verlinden (yellow card) 75'; S.Ayoola 87'	Report	Barrett 48', 68'; R.Medford-Smith (yellow card) 67'; Loader 82'	Stadium: St George's Park National Football Centre

11 December 2017 12	Blackburn Rovers U23	v	Reading U23	Leigh
19:00 GMT				Stadium: Leigh Sports Village

18 December 2017 13	Reading U23	1–1	Southampton U23	Finchampstead
12:30 GMT	J.Sheppard (yellow card) 45'; House (yellow card) 45' (goal) 90'; Odimayo (yellow card) 60'	Report	A.Little (yellow card) 50' (yellow-red card) 79'; McQueen 77' (pen.); Hesketh (yellow card) 88'; C.Slattery (yellow card) 90+4'	Stadium: Hogwood Park; Attendance: 73; Referee: Carl Brook

8 January 2018 14	Reading U23	2–1	Brighton & Hove Albion U23	Reading
19:00 GMT	Odimayo 75'; Popa (yellow card) 82'; G.Osho (yellow card) 90+1'; Loader 90+5' (pen.)	Report	Hall (yellow card) 74'; Bjørdal 80' (yellow card) 90+5'	Stadium: Madejski Stadium; Attendance: 276; Referee: David Rock

12 January 2018 15	Fulham U23	2–2	Reading U23	Fulham
19:00 GMT	M.Jenz (yellow card) 19'; Williams 45', 64'	Report	Popa 61', 69'	Stadium: Craven Cottage; Attendance: 251; Referee: Sam Purkiss

29 January 2018 16	Reading U23	0–0	Wolverhampton Wanderers U23	Reading
19:00 GMT	House (yellow card) 37'; Loader (yellow card) 53'; J.Holsgrove (yellow card) 63'	Report	B.Goodliffe (yellow card) 45'	Stadium: Madejski Stadium; Attendance: 173; Referee: Carl Brook

4 February 2018 17	Norwich City U23	2–0	Reading U23	Norwich
14:00 GMT	Abrahams 12' (pen.); J.Thomas (yellow card) 28'; S.Mourgos 78' (yellow card) 90+3'; O.Odusina (yellow card) 84'	Report	Kelly (yellow card) 38'; G.Osho (yellow card) 41'; A.Shokunbi (yellow card) 54'; House (yellow card) 84'	Stadium: Carrow Road; Referee: Alan Dale

9 February 2018 12	Blackburn Rovers U23	2–0	Reading U23	Leyland
19:00 GMT	D.Butterworth; Nuttall	Report	T.Howe (yellow card); House (yellow card)	Stadium: County Ground; Referee: Matthew Dicicco

18 February 2018 18	Reading U23	2–3	Middlesbrough U23	High Wycombe
13:00 GMT	T.Frost 29'; A.Shokunbi 87'	Report	Soisalo 27'; T.O'Neill 49'; K.Spence (yellow card) 62'; H.Coulson 79'	Stadium: Adams Park; Attendance: 77; Referee: So Kai Man

5 March 2018 19	Reading U23	2–0	West Bromwich Albion U23	High Wycombe
19:00 GMT	Harriott (yellow card) 30'; Odimayo (yellow card) 53'; J.Sheppard 58' (yellow card) 67'; T.Frost 77'	Report	P.Martinez (yellow card) 85'	Stadium: Adams Park; Attendance: 136; Referee: Gary Parsons

12 March 2018 20	Aston Villa U23	3–1	Reading U23	Birmingham
19:00 GMT	J.Cox (yellow card) 36'; L.Driscoll 39' (o.g.); T.Howe 65' (o.g.); Hepburn-Murphy 69'	Report	Mendes 8'; J.Rollinson (yellow card) 44'	Stadium: Villa Park; Attendance: 371

16 April 2018 21	Reading U23	1–4	Newcastle United U23	High Wycombe
19:00 BST	Odimayo (yellow card) 50'; Frost 60'; Holmes (yellow card) 66'; T.Howe (yellow card) 75'	Report	A.Wilson 15' (yellow card) 76'; O.Bailey 51'; J.Yarney 55'; O'Connor 67'	Stadium: Adams Park; Attendance: 136; Referee: Sam Purkiss

23 April 2018 22	Reading U23	3–1	Stoke City U23	Reading
19:00 BST	Smith 36', 42', 86'; Rinomhota (yellow card) 75'; A.Burley (yellow card) 90+2'	Report	Shenton (yellow card) 24'; W.Forrester 55'	Stadium: Madejski Stadium; Referee: Richard Hulme

==== Play-offs ====
2 May 2018 Semi-final	Aston Villa U23	4–3	Reading U23	Birmingham
19:00 BST	Sarkic (yellow card) 59'; Hepburn-Murphy 62', 90+4' (yellow card) 90+6'; Suliman 64'; Blackett-Taylor 79'	Report	G.Osho 61'; R.Medford-Smith (yellow card) 63'; T.Mcintyre 75'; T.Howe 81'	Stadium: Villa Park; Referee: Joseph Johnson

=== Premier League International Cup ===
==== Group stage ====
Team	Pld	W	D	L	GF	GA	GD	Pts
(England) Arsenal	3	2	1	0	6	2	+4	7
(Portugal) Porto	3	2	0	1	3	1	+2	6
(Germany) Bayern Munich	3	1	0	2	3	6	−3	3
(England) Reading	3	0	1	2	0	3	−3	1

22 September 2017 1	Reading U23 (England)	0–2	(Portugal) Porto B	Southampton
19:00 BST		Report	Galeno 82'; Pereira 90' (pen.)	Stadium: Staplewood Campus; Referee: Savvas Yianni

30 November 2017 2	Arsenal U23 (England)	0–0	(England) Reading U23	Borehamwood
19:00 GMT	Dasilva (yellow card) 54'; Sheaf (yellow card) 79'	Report	Loader (yellow card) 20'	Stadium: Meadow Park; Referee: Ala Dale

8 December 2017 3	Reading U23 (England)	0–1	(Germany) Bayern Munich II	High Wycombe
19:00 GMT		Report	N.Tarnat 12'; M.Shabani (yellow card) 79'	Stadium: Adams Park; Referee: Allan Young

=== EFL Trophy ===
==== Group stage ====
Pos	Lge	Team	Pld	W	PW	PL	L	GF	GA	GD	Pts	Qualification
1	L1	Gillingham (Q)	3	3	0	0	0	10	6	+4	9	Round 2
2	L1	Southend United (Q)	3	2	0	0	1	4	2	+2	6	Round 2
3	L2	Colchester United (E)	3	0	1	0	2	2	5	−3	2	
4	ACA	Reading U21 (E)	3	0	0	1	2	7	10	−3	1	

Updated to match(es) played on 7 November 2017. Source: EFL.com
(E) Eliminated; (Q) Qualified to the phase indicated

29 August 2017 1	Colchester United	2–2 (6–5 p)	Reading U21	Colchester
19:30 BST	Szmodics 5'; O'Sullivan (yellow card) 78'; McKeown 87'	Report	Barrett 19'; Andrésson (yellow card) 28'; R.Medford-Smith (yellow card) 40'; House 42' (yellow card) 52'	Stadium: Colchester Community Stadium; Attendance: 572; Referee: Gavin Ward
	Penalties
	Kinsella (penalty scored); James (penalty scored); Mandron (penalty scored); Dr.Wright (penalty scored); O'Sullivan (penalty scored); Jackson (penalty scored)		(penalty scored) Andrésson; (penalty scored) Smith; (penalty scored) J.Holsgrove; (penalty scored) Holmes; (penalty scored) Barrett; (penalty missed) J.Rollinson

3 October 2017 2	Southend United	1–0	Reading U21	Southend-on-Sea
19:45 BST	Fortuné (yellow card) 23'; Robinson 31'	Report		Stadium: Roots Hall; Attendance: 1,148; Referee: Andy Haines

7 November 2017 3	Gillingham	7–5	Reading U21	Gillingham
19:45 GMT	Cundle 1'; Wilkinson 12'; Wagstaff 29' (yellow card) 53'; O'Neill 39'; N.Mbo (yellow card) 65' (goal) 80'; Oldaker 82', 90'	Report	J.Rollinson 38'; Popa 49', 83'; Holmes (yellow card) 52'; R.Medford-Smith 57'; J.Sheppard 68'	Stadium: Priestfield Stadium; Attendance: 1,039; Referee: Craig Hicks

== Squad statistics ==
As of match played 6 May 2018

=== Appearances and goals ===
No.	Pos	Nat	Player	Total		Championship		FA Cup		League Cup	
No.	Pos	Nat	Player	Apps	Goals	Apps	Goals	Apps	Goals	Apps	Goals
1	GK	(Italy) ITA	Vito Mannone	41	0	41	0	0	0	0	0
2	DF	(Wales) WAL	Chris Gunter	52	1	46	1	2+1	0	3	0
3	DF	(England) ENG	Tommy Elphick	4	0	2+2	0	0	0	0	0
4	MF	(Netherlands) NED	Joey van den Berg	34	1	31+2	1	1	0	0	0
5	DF	(Republic of Ireland) IRL	Paul McShane	27	0	23+3	0	1	0	0	0
6	DF	(England) ENG	Liam Moore	49	3	46	3	1	0	2	0
8	MF	(England) ENG	George Evans	22	2	9+9	1	1	0	3	1
9	FW	(France) FRA	Joseph Mendes	4	0	1+2	0	0	0	1	0
10	MF	(England) ENG	John Swift	26	2	17+7	2	0+1	0	1	0
11	DF	(England) ENG	Jordan Obita	3	0	0+2	0	0	0	1	0
12	MF	(Jamaica) JAM	Garath McCleary	21	0	9+9	0	2	0	1	0
14	FW	(Nigeria) NGR	Sone Aluko	40	3	36+3	3	1	0	0	0
16	MF	(Wales) WAL	David Edwards	35	3	27+5	3	3	0	0	0
17	FW	(The Gambia) GAM	Modou Barrow	45	10	37+4	10	1+1	0	0+2	0
18	FW	(France) FRA	Yann Kermorgant	30	2	16+12	2	1+1	0	0	0
19	MF	(Curaçao) CUW	Leandro Bacuna	38	2	29+4	1	3	0	2	1
20	DF	(Portugal) POR	Tiago Ilori	34	0	26+3	0	3	0	2	0
21	MF	(Republic of Ireland) IRL	Stephen Quinn	2	0	0	0	0	0	1+1	0
22	MF	(Netherlands) NED	Pelle Clement	28	0	10+13	0	2	0	2+1	0
23	FW	(Iceland) ISL	Jón Daði Böðvarsson	36	10	20+13	7	2	3	0+1	0
24	DF	(England) ENG	Tyler Blackett	28	0	19+6	0	1	0	0+2	0
27	FW	(Scotland) SCO	Chris Martin	10	1	4+6	1	0	0	0	0
31	GK	(Finland) FIN	Anssi Jaakkola	11	0	5	0	3	0	3	0
37	DF	(Iceland) ISL	Axel Andrésson	2	0	0	0	0	0	1+1	0
38	MF	(Republic of Ireland) IRL	Liam Kelly	38	7	29+5	5	2	0	2	2
42	MF	(England) ENG	Andy Rinomhota	2	0	0	0	0	0	2	0
50	DF	(England) ENG	Omar Richards	16	2	9+4	2	1+1	0	1	0
55	FW	(England) ENG	Sam Smith	11	2	4+4	1	0+1	0	2	1
56	FW	(England) ENG	Danny Loader	1	0	0	0	0	0	0+1	0
57	DF	(England) ENG	Tom Holmes	1	0	1	0	0	0	0	0
Players away from the club on loan:
25	MF	(Romania) ROU	Adrian Popa	8	0	3+3	0	0	0	2	0
39	MF	(Republic of Ireland) IRL	Josh Barrett	1	0	0	0	0	0	1	0
Players who appeared for Reading but left during the season:
7	MF	(Netherlands) NED	Roy Beerens	20	2	9+8	2	2	0	1	0

=== Goal scorers ===
As of match played 6 May 2018

Place	Position	Nation	Number	Name	Championship	FA Cup	League Cup	Total
1	FW	(The Gambia)	17	Modou Barrow	10	0	0	10
1	FW	(Iceland)	23	Jón Daði Böðvarsson	7	3	0	10
3	MF	(Republic of Ireland)	38	Liam Kelly	5	0	2	7
4				Own goal	3	1	0	4
5	DF	(England)	6	Liam Moore	3	0	0	3
5	MF	(Wales)	16	David Edwards	3	0	0	3
5	FW	(Nigeria)	14	Sone Aluko	3	0	0	3
8	MF	(England)	10	John Swift	2	0	0	2
8	MF	(Netherlands)	7	Roy Beerens	2	0	0	2
8	DF	(England)	50	Omar Richards	2	0	0	2
8	FW	(France)	18	Yann Kermorgant	2	0	0	2
8	MF	(England)	8	George Evans	1	0	1	2
8	MF	(Curaçao)	19	Leandro Bacuna	1	0	1	2
8	FW	(England)	55	Sam Smith	1	0	1	2
14	MF	(Netherlands)	4	Joey van den Berg	1	0	0	1
14	DF	(Wales)	2	Chris Gunter	1	0	0	1
14	FW	(Scotland)	27	Chris Martin	1	0	0	1
Total					48	4	5	57

=== Clean sheets ===
Place	Position	Nation	Number	Name	Championship	FA Cup	League Cup	Total
1	GK	(Italy)	1	Vito Mannone	8	0	0	8
2	GK	(Finland)	31	Anssi Jaakkola	0	2	1	3
TOTALS					8	2	1	11

=== Disciplinary record ===
As of match played 6 May 2018

Number	Nation	Position	Name	Championship		FA Cup		League Cup		Total	
Number	Nation	Position	Name	Yellow card	Red card	Yellow card	Red card	Yellow card	Red card	Yellow card	Red card
1	(Italy)	GK	Vito Mannone	2	0	0	0	0	0	2	0
2	(Wales)	DF	Chris Gunter	6	0	0	0	0	0	6	0
3	(England)	DF	Tommy Elphick	1	0	0	0	0	0	1	0
4	(Netherlands)	MF	Joey van den Berg	8	0	0	0	0	0	8	0
5	(Republic of Ireland)	DF	Paul McShane	5	0	0	0	0	0	5	0
6	(England)	DF	Liam Moore	6	0	0	0	0	0	6	0
8	(England)	MF	George Evans	5	0	0	0	0	0	5	0
10	(England)	MF	John Swift	4	0	0	0	0	0	4	0
11	(England)	DF	Jordan Obita	1	0	0	0	0	0	1	0
12	(Jamaica)	MF	Garath McCleary	2	0	0	0	0	0	2	0
14	(Nigeria)	FW	Sone Aluko	4	0	0	0	0	0	4	0
16	(Wales)	MF	David Edwards	6	1	0	0	0	0	6	1
17	(The Gambia)	FW	Modou Barrow	5	0	0	0	0	0	5	0
18	(France)	FW	Yann Kermorgant	4	1	0	0	0	0	4	1
19	(Curaçao)	MF	Leandro Bacuna	8	1	1	0	1	0	10	1
20	(Portugal)	DF	Tiago Ilori	3	1	1	0	0	0	4	1
22	(Netherlands)	MF	Pelle Clement	2	0	0	0	0	0	2	0
23	(Iceland)	FW	Jón Daði Böðvarsson	1	0	0	0	0	0	1	0
24	(England)	DF	Tyler Blackett	1	1	0	0	0	0	1	1
27	(Scotland)	FW	Chris Martin	1	0	0	0	0	0	1	0
31	(Finland)	GK	Anssi Jaakkola	1	0	0	0	0	0	1	0
38	(Republic of Ireland)	MF	Liam Kelly	3	0	0	0	0	0	3	0
50	(England)	DF	Omar Richards	3	0	1	0	0	0	4	0
Players who left Reading during the season:
7	(Netherlands)	MF	Roy Beerens	1	0	0	0	0	0	1	0
Total					82	5	3	0	1	87	5

== U21/23 statistics ==
As of match played 23 April 2018

=== Appearances and goals ===
No.	Pos	Nat	Player	Total		Premier League 2		Premier League 2 Playoff		Premier League Cup		EFL Trophy		Premier League International Cup	
No.	Pos	Nat	Player	Apps	Goals	Apps	Goals	Apps	Goals	Apps	Goals	Apps	Goals	Apps	Goals
9	FW	(France) FRA	Joseph Mendes	4	1	4	1	0	0	0	0	0	0	0	0
15	MF	(England) ENG	Callum Harriott	1	0	1	0	0	0	0	0	0	0	0	0
20	DF	(Portugal) POR	Tiago Ilori	1	0	0	0	0	0	0	0	0	0	1	0
22	MF	(Netherlands) NED	Pelle Clement	2	0	0	0	0	0	0	0	1	0	1	0
24	DF	(England) ENG	Tyler Blackett	1	0	0	0	0	0	0	0	0	0	1	0
30	DF	(England) ENG	Tennai Watson	8	0	6	0	1	0	0	0	0	0	1	0
31	GK	(Finland) FIN	Anssi Jaakkola	1	0	0	0	0	0	0	0	0	0	1	0
37	DF	(Iceland) ISL	Axel Andrésson	11	0	9	0	0	0	0	0	1	0	1	0
38	MF	(Republic of Ireland) IRL	Liam Kelly	1	0	1	0	0	0	0	0	0	0	0	0
40	GK	(Australia) AUS	Liam Driscoll	7	0	7	0	0	0	0	0	0	0	0	0
41	MF	(England) ENG	Ryan East	29	1	22	1	1	0	0	0	3	0	3	0
42	MF	(England) ENG	Andy Rinomhota	8	0	5	0	1	0	0	0	1	0	1	0
45	FW	(England) ENG	Ben House	22	5	14+4	4	1	0	0	0	2	1	0+1	0
46	DF	(England) ENG	Teddy Howe	15	1	6+8	0	0+1	1	0	0	0	0	0	0
48	DF	(England) ENG	Ramarni Medford-Smith	27	2	19+2	1	1	0	0	0	3	1	1+1	0
49	DF	(England) ENG	Gabriel Osho	25	1	20	0	1	1	0	0	3	0	1	0
50	DF	(England) ENG	Omar Richards	4	0	1	0	0	0	0	0	0	0	3	0
51	MF	(England) ENG	Tyler Frost	22	3	14+3	3	1	0	0	0	2+1	0	0+1	0
52	MF	(Australia) AUS	Joel Rollinson	17	1	9+5	0	0	0	0	0	1+1	1	1	0
54	MF	(England) ENG	Ade Shokunbi	9	1	4+5	1	0	0	0	0	0	0	0	0
55	FW	(England) ENG	Sam Smith	9	7	6	7	0	0	0	0	2	0	1	0
56	FW	(England) ENG	Danny Loader	17	5	13	5	1	0	0	0	0	0	3	0
57	DF	(England) ENG	Tom Holmes	24	0	16+1	0	1	0	0	0	3	0	2+1	0
58	MF	(Scotland) SCO	Jordan Holsgrove	20	2	15+2	2	0	0	0	0	1	0	2	0
59	FW	(Republic of Ireland) IRL	Conor Davis	1	0	0+1	0	0	0	0	0	0	0	0	0
60	MF	(Saint Kitts and Nevis) SKN	Andre Burley	6	0	3+1	0	0	0	0	0	2	0	0	0
61	MF	(England) ENG	Cameron Green	2	0	1+1	0	0	0	0	0	0	0	0	0
67	DF	(England) ENG	Akin Odimayo	6	1	4+2	1	0	0	0	0	0	0	0	0
	GK	(England) ENG	Luke Southwood	2	0	0	0	1	0	0	0	0	0	1	0
	DF	(Scotland) SCO	Tom McIntyre	7	1	2+3	0	1	1	0	0	0	0	1	0
	MF	(England) ENG	Jamal Balogun	1	0	1	0	0	0	0	0	0	0	0	0
	MF	(England) ENG	Ethan Coleman	3	0	0+3	0	0	0	0	0	0	0	0	0
	MF	(England) ENG	Jack Nolan	5	0	0+4	0	0+1	0	0	0	0	0	0	0
	MF	(England) ENG	Khalid Simmo	1	0	0+1	0	0	0	0	0	0	0	0	0
	MF	(England) ENG	Joseph Wilson	1	0	0+1	0	0	0	0	0	0	0	0	0
	FW	(England) ENG	Toyosi Olusanya	1	0	0+1	0	0	0	0	0	0	0	0	0
Players away from the club on loan:
25	MF	(Romania) ROU	Adrian Popa	5	4	3	2	0	0	0	0	1	2	1	0
35	DF	(Scotland) SCO	Jake Sheppard	15	2	10	1	0	0	0	0	2	1	3	0
39	MF	(Republic of Ireland) IRL	Josh Barrett	18	9	11+1	8	0	0	0	0	2+1	1	3	0
43	GK	(England) ENG	George Legg	20	0	15	0	0	0	0	0	3	0	2	0
Players who left Reading during the season:

=== Goal scorers ===
As of match played 16 April 2018

Place	Position	Nation	Number	Name	Premier League 2	Premier League 2 Playoff	Premier League Cup	EFL Trophy	Premier League International Cup	Total
1	MF	(Republic of Ireland)	39	Josh Barrett	8	0	1	0	9	
2	FW	(England)	55	Sam Smith	7	0	0	0	0	7
3	FW	(England)	56	Danny Loader	5	0	0	0	0	5
3	FW	(Scotland)	45	Ben House	4	0	0	1	0	5
5	MF	(Romania)	25	Adrian Popa	2	0	0	2	0	4
6	MF	(England)	51	Tyler Frost	3	0	0	0	0	3
7	MF	(Scotland)	58	Jordan Holsgrove	2	0	0	0	0	2
7	DF	(England)	48	Ramarni Medford-Smith	1	0	0	1	0	2
7	DF	(Scotland)	35	Jake Sheppard	1	0	0	1	0	2
9	MF	(England)	41	Ryan East	1	0	0	0	0	1
9	DF	(England)	67	Akin Odimayo	1	0	0	0	0	1
9	MF	(England)	54	Ade Shokunbi	1	0	0	0	0	1
9	FW	(France)	9	Joseph Mendes	1	0	0	0	0	1
9	DF	(England)	49	Gabriel Osho	0	1	0	0	0	1
9	DF	(Scotland)		Tom McIntyre	0	1	0	0	0	1
9	DF	(England)	46	Teddy Howe	0	1	0	0	0	1
9	MF	(Australia)	52	Joel Rollinson	0	0	0	1	0	1
9				Own goal	1	0	0	0	0	1
Total					38	3	0	7	0	48

=== Disciplinary record ===
As of match played 16 April 2018

Number	Nation	Position	Name	Premier League 2		Premier League 2 Playoff		Premier League Cup		EFL Trophy		Premier League International Cup		Total	
Number	Nation	Position	Name	Yellow card	Red card	Yellow card	Red card	Yellow card	Red card	Yellow card	Red card	Yellow card	Red card	Yellow card	Red card
15	(England)	MF	Callum Harriott	1	0	0	0	0	0	0	0	0	0	1	0
37	(Iceland)	DF	Axel Andrésson	2	1	0	0	0	0	1	0	0	0	3	1
38	(Republic of Ireland)	MF	Liam Kelly	1	0	0	0	0	0	0	0	0	0	1	0
41	(England)	MF	Ryan East	2	0	0	0	0	0	0	0	0	0	2	0
42	(England)	MF	Andy Rinomhota	2	0	0	0	0	0	0	0	0	0	2	0
45	(Scotland)	FW	Ben House	5	0	0	0	0	0	1	0	0	0	6	0
46	(England)	DF	Teddy Howe	4	0	0	0	0	0	0	0	0	0	4	0
48	(England)	DF	Ramarni Medford-Smith	4	0	1	0	0	0	1	0	0	0	6	0
52	(Australia)	MF	Joel Rollinson	1	0	0	0	0	0	0	0	0	0	1	0
54	(England)	MF	Ade Shokunbi	1	0	0	0	0	0	0	0	0	0	1	0
55	(England)	FW	Sam Smith	1	0	0	0	0	0	0	0	0	0	1	0
56	(England)	FW	Danny Loader	4	0	0	0	0	0	0	0	1	0	5	0
57	(England)	DF	Tom Holmes	2	0	0	0	0	0	1	0	0	0	3	0
58	(Scotland)	MF	Jordan Holsgrove	2	0	0	0	0	0	0	0	0	0	2	0
60	(Saint Kitts and Nevis)	MF	Andre Burley	2	0	0	0	0	0	0	0	0	0	2	0
67	(England)	DF	Akin Odimayo	3	0	0	0	0	0	0	0	0	0	3	0
Players out on loan:
25	(Romania)	MF	Adrian Popa	1	0	0	0	0	0	0	0	0	0	1	0
35	(Scotland)	DF	Jake Sheppard	4	0	0	0	0	0	0	0	0	0	4	0
39	(Republic of Ireland)	MF	Josh Barrett	3	0	0	0	0	0	0	0	0	0	3	0
43	(England)	GK	George Legg	1	0	0	0	0	0	0	0	0	0	1	0
49	(England)	DF	Gabriel Osho	3	1	0	0	0	0	0	0	0	0	3	1
Total				49	2	1	0	0	0	4	0	1	0	55	2
