= Danzell Gravenberch =

Surinamese footballer (born 1994)

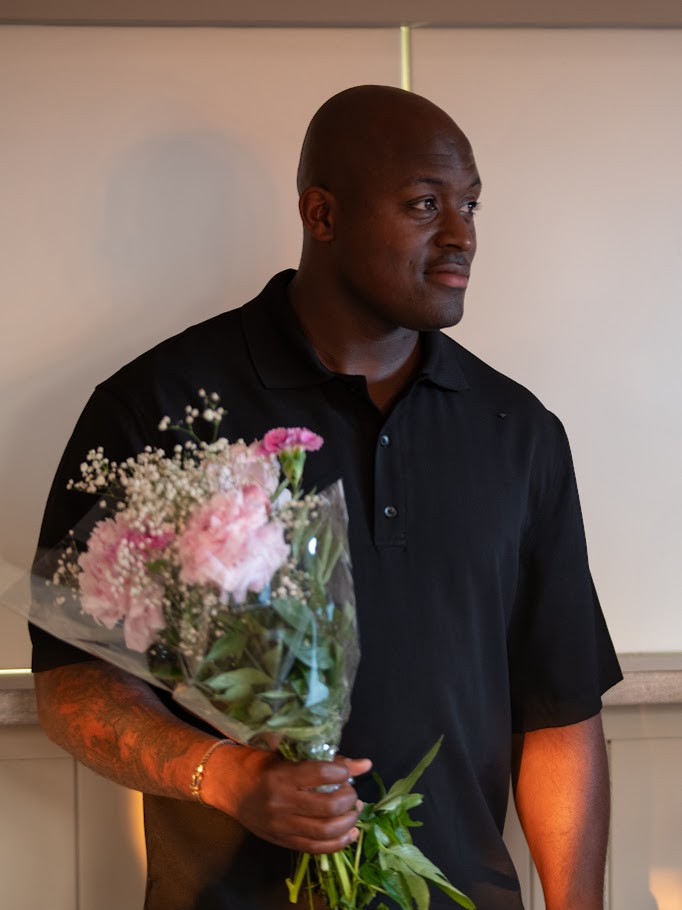
- Gravenberch in 2025

Personal information
- Full name: Danzell Orlando Marcelino Gravenberch
- Date of birth: 13 February 1994 (age 32)
- Place of birth: Amsterdam, Netherlands
- Height: 1.86 m (6 ft 1 in)
- Positions: Striker; centre-back

Team information
- Current team: Real Sranang (manager)

Youth career
- 2002: SV Bijlmer
- 2002–2013: Ajax

Senior career*
Years	Team	Apps	(Gls)
2013–2014	Ajax	0	(0)
2013–2014	→ Jong Ajax	15	(1)
2014	→ NEC (loan)	6	(0)
2014–2015	Universitatea Cluj	17	(1)
2015–2016	Dordrecht	28	(0)
2016–2019	Reading	2	(0)
2017–2019	→ Roeselare (loan)	30	(0)
2019–2020	TOP Oss	9	(0)
2020	Dordrecht	8	(2)
2020–2021	Sparta	20	(4)
2021–2023	De Graafschap	43	(8)
2023	Karmiotissa	18	(1)
2023–2024	Telstar	26	(3)
2024–2025	Den Bosch	36	(6)
Total		250	(26)

International career
2010	Netherlands U16	4	(0)
2010–2011	Netherlands U17	9	(1)
2011–2012	Netherlands U18	2	(0)
2012–2013	Netherlands U19	5	(0)
2023	Suriname	1	(0)

Managerial career
- 2024–: Real Sranang
Medal record
Men's football
Representing Netherlands
UEFA European Under-17 Championship
Winner	2011 Serbia
- * Club domestic league appearances and goals

Danzell Orlando Marcelino Gravenberch (born 13 February 1994) is a former professional footballer who played as a striker. Born in the Netherlands, he played for the Suriname national team. He is the manager of Derde Klasse club Real Sranang.

== Club career ==
=== Ajax ===
Born in Amsterdam, Gravenberch began playing football in the youth ranks of local amateur side SV Bijlmer, from where he was recruited to join the Ajax Academy in 2002. Gravenberch helped the Ajax A1 youth squad win the 2011–12 Nike Eredivisie league title. The team finished as runners-up to Inter Milan in the NextGen Series (the Champions League equivalent for under-20 teams) after losing on penalties (5–3) following a 1–1 deadlock after extra time.

On 7 June 2012, it was announced that Gravenberch had signed his first professional contract, a three-year deal binding him to the club until 30 June 2015. Gravenberch began his career in the youth teams of Ajax as a striker, but was moved back to play as a defender while playing for Jong Ajax under manager Fred Grim in the 2012–13 Beloften Eredivisie. Jong Ajax were promoted to the Eerste Divisie, the second tier of professional football in the Netherlands, for the 2013–14 season. Gravenberch made his professional debut in a 2–0 away loss to FC Oss in the Eerste Divisie on 8 August 2013. He was cautioned before being replaced by Sven Nieuwpoort on 46 minutes.

==== NEC (loan) ====
On 17 January 2014, it was announced that Gravenberch had been sent on loan to NEC until the end of the season.

=== Universitatea Cluj ===
On 4 September 2014, it was announced that Gravenberch had signed with Romanian club Universitatea Cluj. The move came after an unsuccessful trial period with Scottish Premiership side Dundee. Gravenberch signed a 2-year contract with U Cluj, reuniting him with his former coach and now technical director of the club Alfons Groenendijk, as well as newly appointed manager and former Ajax player George Ogăraru. He made his Liga I debut on 14 September 2014 in an away match against FC Rapid București which ended in a 2–1 loss.

=== FC Dordrecht ===
On 24 June 2015 it was announced that Gravenberch had returned to the Netherlands, signing with the recently relegated FC Dordrecht, competing in the Eerste Divisie.

=== Reading ===
On 25 May 2016 Reading announced the signing of Gravenberch on a three-year contract, the deal was then officially completed when the transfer window opened on 1 July 2016. On 23 August 2016 Gravenberch made his competitive debut vs MK Dons in the EFL Cup. He made his league debut as a late substitute against Aston Villa on 18 October 2016. In October 2016, Gravenberch was criticized by Arsenal manager, Arsene Wenger, for a challenge on Lucas Perez, which left the Arsenal striker out for at least 6 weeks.

On 4 July 2017, Gravenberch moved to Belgian First Division B club Roeselare for two seasons on loan. However, he was injured throughout his first season with Roesleare.

He was released by Reading at the end of the 2018–19 season.

=== Return to the Netherlands ===
In September 2019, Gravenberch joined Eerste Divisie club TOP Oss. After an unfortunate first half of the season, in which he failed to score and was also utilised as a centre-back, he left the club again. Gravenberch would play the remainder of the season at his former club Dordrecht.

In June 2020, Sparta Rotterdam picked up Gravenberch from Dordrecht one a one-year deal. With Sparta, he scored his first-ever goals in the Eredivisie, ending the 2020–21 season with 4 goals in 20 appearances. On 30 March 2021, it was announced that his contract would not be extended.

In May 2021, Gravenberch signed a two-year contract with De Graafschap.

After a short stint with Cypriot club Karmiotissa, Gravenberch signed a one-year contract with Eerste Divisie club Telstar on 31 August 2023.

On 30 July 2024, Gravenberch signed with FC Den Bosch for the 2024–25 season, with an option for the 2025–26 season. He left the club in June 2025, and announced his retirement from football.

== International career ==
Gravenberch has played for the Netherlands at various youth levels. On 6 February 2010, he received his first U-16 cap in a match against Italy at the Albufeira 4 Nations Tournament in Portugal.

On 17 September 2010, Gravenberch made his U-17 debut in another encounter with Italy during the Ursapharm-Vier-Nationen-Turnier in Germany. The following year, he was selected by Albert Stuivenberg to play in the 2012 UEFA European Under-17 Championship, where he helped the Netherlands to their second consecutive title, defeating Germany in the final 5–4 on penalties, after extra time following a 1–1 deadlock. Gravenberch was also selected for the 2011 FIFA U-17 World Cup in Mexico where he scored his first goal in the second group stage match against North Korea. He appeared in all three group stage matches, of which they managed one victory, a draw and a loss resulting in an early exit from the tournament for the Dutch.

On 11 November 2011, Gravenberch made his U-18 debut in a friendly match against Romania. His U-19 debut came in a friendly match against Scotland on 10 September 2012. He was selected by U-19 head coach Wim van Zwam for the 2013 UEFA European Under-19 Championship in Lithuania, appearing in all three group stage matches before being eliminated following one win and two losses.

In 2023, however, Gravenberch decided to represent the home country of his parents, Suriname, and made his debut in March 2023 against Mexico.

== Coaching career ==
On 18 June 2024, while still playing football professionally, Gravenberch was announced as head coach of Vierde Klasse club Real Sranang. He led the team to promotion to the Derde Klasse in his first season, after already in January 2025 having extended his contract with the club until 2026.

== Personal life ==
Gravenberch is of Surinamese descent. His younger brother, Ryan Gravenberch, is also a professional footballer.

== Career statistics ==
Appearances and goals by club, season and competition
Club	Season	League			National cup (Note: Includes KNVB Cup, Romanian Cup, Belgian Cup)		League cup (Note: Includes Cupa Ligii, EFL Cup)		Other		Total	
Club	Season	Division	Apps	Goals	Apps	Goals	Apps	Goals	Apps	Goals	Apps	Goals
Ajax	2013–14	Eredivisie	0	0	0	0	—		0	0	0	0
Ajax	2014–15	Eredivisie	0	0	0	0	—		0	0	0	0
Ajax	Total		0	0	0	0	—		0	0	0	0
NEC (loan)	2013–14	Eredivisie	6	0	1	0	—		2 (Note: Appearances in Eredivisie relegation play-offs)	0	9	0
Universitatea Cluj	2014–15	Liga I	17	1	4	0	1	0	—		22	1
Dordrecht	2015–16	Eerste Divisie	28	0	0	0	—		—		28	0
Reading	2016–17	Championship	2	0	0	0	3	0	—		5	0
Reading	2017–18	Championship	0	0	0	0	0	0	—		0	0
Reading	Total		2	0	0	0	3	0	—		5	0
Roeselare (loan)	2017–18	Belgian First Division B	6	0	1	0	—		—		7	0
Roeselare (loan)	2018–19	Belgian First Division B	24	0	0	0	—		—		24	0
Roeselare (loan)	Total		30	0	1	0	—		—		31	0
TOP Oss	2019–20	Eerste Divisie	9	0	2	0	—		—		11	0
Dordrecht	2019–20	Eerste Divisie	8	2	—		—		—		8	2
Sparta Rotterdam	2020–21	Eredivisie	20	4	1	1	—		—		21	5
De Graafschap	2021–22	Eerste Divisie	24	4	0	0	—		2 (Note: Appearance(s) in Eredivisie promotion play-offs)	1	26	5
De Graafschap	2022–23	Eerste Divisie	19	4	2	1	—		—		21	5
De Graafschap	Total		43	8	2	1	—		2	1	47	10
Karmiotissa	2022–23	Cypriot First Division	17	1	—		—		—		17	1
Karmiotissa	2023–24	Cypriot First Division	1	0	—		—		—		1	0
Karmiotissa	Total		18	1	—		—		—		18	1
Telstar	2023–24	Eerste Divisie	26	3	1	0	—		—		27	3
FC Den Bosch	2024–25	Eerste Divisie	36	6	1	0	—		1	0	27	3
Career total			250	26	13	2	4	0	5	1	272	29

== Honours ==
=== Club ===
Ajax U19

- A-Junioren Eredivisie: 2011–12
- NextGen Series runner-up: 2011–12

Universitatea Cluj

- Cupa României runner-up: 2014–15

=== International ===
Netherlands U17

- UEFA European Under-17 Football Championship: 2011
