= Omar Richards =

English footballer (born 1998)

Personal information
- Full name: Omar Tyrell Crawford Richards
- Date of birth: 15 February 1998 (age 28)
- Place of birth: Lewisham, England
- Height: 5 ft 9 in (1.74 m)
- Positions: Left-back; wing-back

Team information
- Current team: Aris
- Number: 3

Youth career
- 2008–2013: Fulham
- 2013–2017: Reading

Senior career*
Years	Team	Apps	(Gls)
2017–2021	Reading	92	(2)
2021–2022	Bayern Munich	12	(0)
2022–2026	Nottingham Forest	0	(0)
2023–2024	→ Olympiacos (loan)	10	(0)
2024–2025	→ Rio Ave (loan)	26	(0)
2025–2026	→ Rio Ave (loan)	14	(0)
2026–	Aris	4	(0)

International career
2019	England U21	1	(0)
- * Club domestic league appearances and goals as of 19 September 2026

Omar Tyrell Crawford Richards (born 15 February 1998) is an English professional footballer who plays as a left back or a wing back for Greek Super League club Aris.

== Club career ==
=== Reading ===
Richards played for local teams before he joined Fulham at age 10. Following his release from Fulham Under-16, he first played at Kinetic Academy, and then he signed his first professional contract with Reading under academy manager Eamonn Dolan in July 2016. Reading's academy coach, David Dodds, converted him from a left-sided forward into a left-back.

Richards made his debut for Reading under coach Jaap Stam on the opening day of the 2017–18 season, coming on as a 59th minute substitute for Jón Daði Böðvarsson following Tiago Ilori's red card. On 30 November 2017, Reading announced that Richards had signed a new deal with club until 2021. He scored his first professional goal in a 1–1 draw with Nottingham Forest on 20 February 2018.

=== Bayern Munich ===
On 27 May 2021, Bayern Munich announced the signing of Richards to a four-year contract as a free agent once his Reading contract expired in June 2021.

=== Nottingham Forest ===
On 10 July 2022, recently promoted Premier League club Nottingham Forest announced the signing of Richards on a four-year contract for an €8.5 million transfer fee.

==== Loans to Olympiacos and Rio Ave ====
On 25 August 2023, Richards joined Greek Super League club Olympiacos on loan for the 2023–24 season.

On 20 August 2024, Richards joined Primeira Liga side Rio Ave on a season-long loan. On 1 September 2025, he returned to Rio Ave on another season-long loan deal.

=== Aris ===
On 21 August 2026, Richards joined Greek Super League side Aris on a four-year contract.

== International career ==
Born in England, Richards is of Jamaican descent and has expressed an interest in representing the Jamaica national team. On 30 August 2019, Richards received his first international call-up with a place in the England U21 squad. He eventually made his U21 debut on 11 October 2019 as a substitute during a 2–2 draw against Slovenia in Maribor.

== Personal life ==
Richards was born in Lewisham; where he grew up with his mother, a single parent, and two brothers.

== Career statistics ==
As of match played 1 March 2026

Appearances and goals by club, season and competition
Club	Season	League			National cup (Note: Includes FA Cup, DFB-Pokal, Greek Football Cup, Taça de Portugal)		League cup (Note: Includes EFL Cup)		Europe		Other		Total	
Club	Season	Division	Apps	Goals	Apps	Goals	Apps	Goals	Apps	Goals	Apps	Goals	Apps	Goals
Reading U23	2016–17	—			—		—		—		2 (Note: Appearances in EFL Trophy)	0	2	0
Reading	2017–18	Championship	13	2	2	0	1	0	—		—		16	2
Reading	2018–19	Championship	10	0	1	0	1	0	—		—		12	0
Reading	2019–20	Championship	28	0	4	1	2	0	—		—		34	1
Reading	2020–21	Championship	41	0	0	0	1	0	—		—		42	0
Reading	Total		92	2	7	1	5	0	—		2	0	106	3
Bayern Munich	2021–22	Bundesliga	12	0	1	0	—		4 (Note: Appearances in UEFA Champions League)	0	0	0	17	0
Bayern Munich	Total		12	0	1	0	—		4	0	0	0	17	0
Nottingham Forest	2022–23	Premier League	0	0	0	0	0	0	—		—		0	0
Olympiacos (loan)	2023–24	Super League Greece	10	0	1	0	—		3 (Note: One appearance in the UEFA Europa League, two appearance in the UEFA Europa Conference League)	0	—		14	0
Rio Ave (loan)	2024–25	Primeira Liga	26	0	5	0	—		—		—		31	0
Rio Ave (loan)	2025–26	Primeira Liga	14	0	0	0	—		—		—		14	0
Rio Ave (loan)	Total		50	0	6	0	0	0	3	0	—		59	0
Aris	2026–27	Super League Greece	0	0	0	0	—		—		—		0	0
Career total			154	2	14	1	5	0	7	0	2	0	182	3

== Honours ==
Bayern Munich

- Bundesliga: 2021–22
- DFL-Supercup: 2021

Olympiacos

- UEFA Europa Conference League: 2023–24
