= Joel Rollinson =

Australian soccer player (born 1998)

Personal information
- Full name: Joel Robert Paul Rollinson
- Date of birth: 16 November 1998 (age 27)
- Place of birth: Reading, England
- Position: Winger

Youth career
- 2016–2017: Reading

Senior career*
| Years | Team | Apps | (Gls) |
| 2017–2019 | Reading | 0 | (0) |
| 2018–2019 | → Eastbourne Borough (loan) | 9 | (1) |
| 2019–2020 | Stevenage | 1 | (0) |
| 2019–2020 | → Cray Wanderers (loan) | 19 | (3) |
| 2020–2022 | Eastbourne Borough | 55 | (7) |
| 2022–2023 | Hungerford Town | 32 | (3) |
| 2023–2024 | Weymouth | 30 | (2) |
| 2024 | → Beaconsfield Town (dual-reg.) | 6 | (1) |
| 2024 | Farnham Town | 1 | (0) |
| 2024–2025 | Bracknell Town | 34 | (7) |
| 2025 | Basingstoke Town | 7 | (0) |
| 2025–2026 | Ascot United | 4 | (0) |
| 2026 | Bracknell Town | 5 | (0) |
- * Club domestic league appearances and goals as of 12:48, 13 October 2026 (UTC)

Joel Robert Paul Rollinson (born 16 November 1998) is an English professional footballer who plays as a winger.

== Career ==
=== Reading ===
Rollinson began his career at Reading, progressing through the club's academy. During the 2017–18 season, he made two appearances for the Reading under-23 team in the EFL Trophy, debuting as an 88th-minute substitute in a 2–2 draw against Colchester United on 27 August 2017, and scoring in a 7–5 defeat to Gillingham on 7 November 2017.

Without making a senior appearance for Reading, Rollinson joined National League South club Eastbourne Borough on loan on 16 November 2018, initially for one month. He made his debut the following day in a 1–0 away defeat to Bath City. After four appearances, his loan was extended for a further month, and he scored in a 2–1 home victory over Dulwich Hamlet on 1 January 2019. Rollinson made a total of 13 appearances, scoring once, before being released by Reading at the conclusion of the season.

=== Stevenage ===
Prior to the 2019–20 season, Rollinson underwent a trial with League Two club Stevenage before signing permanently on 5 August 2019. He made his debut on 20 August 2019, appearing as an 85th-minute substitute in a 1–0 home defeat to Bradford City. After one further first-team appearance, Rollinson joined Isthmian League Premier Division club Cray Wanderers on a three-month loan on 5 November 2019. He scored 38 seconds into his debut in a 6–1 victory against Cheshunt on 9 November 2019. The loan was later extended for the remainder of the season on 9 February 2020. Rollinson made 20 appearances and scored three goals during his time with Cray Wanderers. He was released by Stevenage in June 2020.

=== Eastbourne Borough ===
Ahead of the 2020–21 season, Rollinson returned to Eastbourne Borough on a permanent basis. He made 23 appearances during his first season back at Eastbourne, scoring three times, as the National League South season was curtailed in February 2021 due to restrictions associated with the COVID-19 pandemic.

=== Further spells in non-League ===
On 7 June 2022, Rollinson joined fellow National League South club Hungerford Town.

In May 2023, he signed for Weymouth following Hungerford's relegation.

On 27 May 2024, Rollinson joined newly-promoted Isthmian League South Central Division club Farnham Town ahead of the 2024–25 campaign, but was released in September. Following his departure from Farnham, Rollinson joined Bracknell Town.

== Career statistics ==
As of match played 23 September 2025

| Club | Season | League | | | FA Cup | | EFL Cup | | Other | | Total | |
| Club | Season | Division | Apps | Goals | Apps | Goals | Apps | Goals | Apps | Goals | Apps | Goals |
|---|---|---|---|---|---|---|---|---|---|---|---|---|
| Reading | 2017–18 | Championship | 0 | 0 | 0 | 0 | 0 | 0 | 0 | 0 | 0 | 0 |
| Reading | 2018–19 | Championship | 0 | 0 | 0 | 0 | 0 | 0 | 0 | 0 | 0 | 0 |
| Reading | Total | | 0 | 0 | 0 | 0 | 0 | 0 | 0 | 0 | 0 | 0 |
| Reading U21 | 2017–18 | | | | | | | | 2 (Note: Appearance(s) in EFL Trophy) | 1 | 2 | 1 |
| Eastbourne Borough (loan) | 2018–19 | National League South | 9 | 1 | 0 | 0 | — | | 4 (Note: Three appearances in FA Trophy; one appearance in Sussex Senior Challenge Cup) | 0 | 13 | 1 |
| Stevenage | 2019–20 | League Two | 1 | 0 | 0 | 0 | 0 | 0 | 1 | 0 | 2 | 0 |
| Cray Wanderers (loan) | 2019–20 | Isthmian League Premier Division | 19 | 3 | 0 | 0 | — | | 1 (Note: Appearance in Alan Turvey Trophy) | 0 | 20 | 3 |
| Eastbourne Borough | 2020–21 | National League South | 19 | 3 | 4 | 0 | — | | 0 | 0 | 23 | 3 |
| Eastbourne Borough | 2021–22 | National League South | 36 | 4 | 3 | 0 | — | | 3 (Note: Two appearances in FA Trophy; one appearance in Sussex Senior Challenge Cup) | 0 | 42 | 4 |
| Eastbourne Borough | Total | | 55 | 7 | 7 | 0 | 0 | 0 | 3 | 0 | 65 | 7 |
| Hungerford Town | 2022–23 | National League South | 32 | 3 | 0 | 0 | — | | 3 (Note: Appearances in FA Trophy) | 0 | 35 | 3 |
| Weymouth | 2023–24 | National League South | 31 | 2 | 0 | 0 | — | | 2 | 0 | 33 | 2 |
| Beaconsfield Town | 2023–24 | Southern League Premier Division South | 6 | 1 | — | | — | | — | | 6 | 1 |
| Farnham Town | 2024–25 | Isthmian League South Central Division | 1 | 0 | 2 | 0 | — | | 2 | 0 | 5 | 0 |
| Bracknell Town | 2024–25 | Southern League Premier Division South | 34 | 7 | — | | — | | 4 (Note: Appearances in Berks & Bucks Senior Cup) | 3 | 38 | 10 |
| Basingstoke Town | 2025–26 | Southern League Premier Division South | 7 | 0 | 1 | 0 | — | | 0 | 0 | 8 | 0 |
| Career total | | | 195 | 24 | 10 | 0 | 0 | 0 | 22 | 4 | 227 | 28 |
