= Sheridan Ming =

Bermudian cricketer (born 1965)

Personal information
- Born: 3 August 1965 (age 61); Bermuda
- Batting: Right-handed
- Bowling: Right-arm medium-slow

Domestic team information
- Years: Team
- 2000/01: Bermuda

Career statistics
Competition	List A
Matches	1
Runs scored	0
Batting average	0.00
100s/50s	–/–
Top score	0
Balls bowled	–
Wickets	–
Bowling average	–
5 wickets in innings	–
10 wickets in match	–
Best bowling	–
Catches/stumpings	–/–
- Source: Cricinfo, 31 March 2013

Sheridan Ming (born 3 August 1965) is a former Bermudian cricketer. Ming was a right-handed batsman who bowled right-arm medium-slow.

Ming made a single List A appearance for Bermuda against the Windward Islands at Ronald Webster Park in the 2000/01 Red Stripe Bowl. The Windward Islands batted first, making 252/5 from their fifty overs. Bermuda were dismissed for 147 in their innings to lose the match by 105 runs, with Ming being dismissed for a duck by Roy Marshall.
