= Real Sranang =

Dutch football club

Coordinates: 52°20′57″N 4°56′46″E

Real Sranang SV
- Full name: Real Sranang Sport Vereeniging
- Nickname: Sranang
- Founded: 1 June 1960; 66 years ago
- Ground: Sportpark Middenmeer, Amsterdam, Netherlands
- Capacity: 400
- League: Vierde Klasse (2023–24)
- Website: www.realsranang.com
Home colours

Real Sranang (English: Royal Suriname) is an amateur association football club from Amsterdam, Netherlands, founded on 1 June 1960, that plays its home games at the Sportpark Middenmeer.

== History ==
Founded on 1 June 1960, by Surinamese immigrants in Amsterdam, Sranang means Suriname in the Sranan Tongo language, and the club is known to be mostly composed of players from the Surinamese community of Amsterdam. The club started the 2013–14 season fielding a Saturday team in the Derde Klasse, and a Sunday team playing in the Vijfde Klasse of the KNVB district West-I. The Sunday first team withdrew from the competition after only seven matches played.
