= 2019–20 Reading F.C. season =

Reading
2019–20 season
- Manager: José Gomes (until 9 October); Mark Bowen (from 14 October)
- Stadium: Madejski Stadium
- Championship: 14th
- FA Cup: Fifth round vs Sheffield United
- EFL Cup: Third round vs Wolverhampton Wanderers
- Top goalscorer: League: Yakou Méïté (13); All: Yakou Méïté (17)
- Highest home attendance: 16,918 vs Leeds United (26 November 2019)
- Lowest home attendance: 10,088 vs Wigan Athletic (26 February 2020)
- Average home league attendance: 11,969
Home colours	Away colours

The 2019–20 season was Reading's 149th year in existence and seventh consecutive season in the Championship, and covers the period from 1 July 2019 to 22 July 2020.

== Season review ==
=== Pre-season ===
On 14 May, Reading announced that they would be heading to Estepona on 7 July, for a two-week training camp that would feature a number of friendly matches.

On 20 June, the fixture list for the 2019–20 EFL Championship season was released, with Reading opening their campaign at home to Sheffield Wednesday, and a couple of hours later Reading where drawn away to Wycombe Wanderers in the first round of the EFL Cup. On 28 June, Reading announced a new principal sponsorship deal with Casumo for two years.

On 2 July, Nicky Shorey returned to the club, taking up the role of Academy Lead Scout, and Mehmet Ali joined from Tottenham Hotspur as U23 Assistant Coach. Three days later, Liam Moore was confirmed as club captain, replacing Paul McShane who had left the club following the expiration of his contract. On 22 July, John O'Shea returned to the club as First Team Coach.

==== Transfers and contracts ====
On 20 June, Lewis Ward moved to Exeter City for an undisclosed fee. On 27 June, Tyler Frost, Adam Liddle and Ramarni Medford-Smith all signed new professional deals until the end of the 2019–20 season, whilst Adam Desbois, Marcel Elva-Fountaine and Roberto Nditi signed their first professional contracts also until the end of the season.

On 8 July, Liam Kelly moved to Feyenoord on a permanent transfer, and Darren Sidoel left the club by mutual consent. On 11 July, Reading announced the season-long loan signing of João Virgínia from Everton. The following day, Reading announced that Jón Daði Böðvarsson had left the club to join Millwall on a permanent transfer. On 15 July, Michael Olise signed a three-year professional contract with Reading. Later that week, on 19 July, Reading announced the signing of Michael Morrison on a two-year contract after his Birmingham City contract expired at the end of the previous season. Reading announced the signing of Charlie Adam on 22 July on a one-year contract after his Stoke City contract expired at the end of the previous season. Two days later, 24 July, Reading announced the return of Matt Miazga on a season-long loan deal from Chelsea, and that forward Marc McNulty had moved to Sunderland on loan for the season. At the end of the month, Reading announced the half-season loan of Liam Driscoll to Yeovil Town and the release of David Meyler, on 30 and 31 July respectively.

On 1 August, Luke Southwood moved to Hamilton Academical on loan until 5 January 2020. The following day, Reading announced the signing of Lucas Boyé on a season-long loan deal from Torino, whilst Sam Smith moved to Cambridge United on loan for the season.

==== Matches ====
On 6 July, Reading won their first preseason friendly in two seasons, a 2–0 victory over Southend United at their Hogwood Training Ground, with goals coming from Michael Olise in the first half and Modou Barrow in the second half. Four days later, Reading defeated Gibraltar United 10–0 in the first game of their Spanish tour in Marbella. Danny Loader scored a hat-trick, Jordan Holsgrove and Yakou Méïté both scored braces and Andrija Novakovich, Tom McIntyre and Josh Barrett also scored. Reading's second game in Spain was against Sevilla at the Estadio Municipal Felipe del Valle in San José de la Rinconada. Reading took the lead in the 57th minute through Novakovich, before a Nolito penalty and José Lara goal game the La Liga club the victory. On 16 July Reading took part in two friendly matches, the first being a 0–0 draw against Malaga B, with the second being a 1–0 victory over Extremadura thanks to a 60th-minute Loader penalty. Reading ended their Spanish tour by playing two games on 20 July, the first being a 1–0 defeat to Lincoln City, with Granada defeating Reading by the same scoreline later in the evening. On Wednesday 24 July, Reading drew with Birmingham City in a behind-doors friendly at Hogwood Park, with the only Reading goal coming from Novakovich. Later on in the afternoon of 24 July, Reading defeated Peterborough United 4–2, with the Reading goals coming from Tyler Blackett, Barrow, John Swift and Barrett. Reading finished their pre-season preparations by hosting Chelsea at the Madejski Stadium on 28 July. Reading took the lead through Barrett in the first half before Ross Barkley and Kenedy scored seeing Chelsea go into half time leading 2–1. Shortly into the second half Michael Morrison equalised before a quick fire double from Mason Mount saw Chelsea take a 4–2 lead. With 19 minutes to go, Sam Baldock pulled one goal back to leave the final score Reading 3–4 Chelsea.

=== August ===
At the start of August, Myles Roberts joined Tonbridge Angels on loan after former Reading goalkeeper Jon Henly was ruled out with a shoulder injury.

Reading's first match of the season was a 1–3 home defeat to Sheffield Wednesday on 3 August, with Yakou Méïté scoring Reading's only goal.

On 5 August Adam Desbois left Reading to join Brighton & Hove Albion, whilst Rafael was released by Sampdoria, with Reading signing him on a three-year contract the following day. Also on 6 August, Reading announced the season-long loan signing of Pelé from AS Monaco, and the signing of Lucas João on a four-year contract from Sheffield Wednesday. On 7 August, George Pușcaș signed for Reading on a five-year contract from Inter Milan for an undisclosed fee. On Transfer Deadline day, 8 August, Ovie Ejaria returned to the club on a season-long loan from Liverpool with a view to a permanent move, whilst Lexus Beeden joined the U23 squad from Tooting & Mitcham. Reading played their second game of the season on 10 August, a 2–1 away defeat to Hull City with Lucas João scoring Readings only goal of the game midway through the second half.

On 12 August, Modou Barrow moved to Denizlispor on a season-long loan deal, with Reading confirming the deal a day later. Also on 13 August, Yeovil Town confirmed that Liam Driscoll had returned to Reading after suffering an injury with The Glovers.

Reading took part in the first round of the EFL Cup on 13 August, drawing 1–1 away to Wycombe Wanderers with George Pușcaș scoring the equaliser in the 63rd minute to force penalties. Reading's debut goalkeeper Rafael Cabral saved two out of four penalties he faced with Reading scoring all of theirs to progress 4–2 on penalties. Following the match the second-round draw was made, with Reading being given an away trip to Plymouth Argyle.

On 16 August, Adrian Popa moved to FCSB on a season-long loan deal.

On 27 August, Jordan Holsgrove joined Atlético Baleares on a season-long loan deal.

On 30 August, Tennai Watson joined Coventry City on loan until 2 January 2020.

=== September ===
On 2 September, Andrija Novakovich left Reading in a permanent transfer to Frosinone for an undisclosed fee, and Tom Holmes joined Roeselare on a season-long loan.

On 18 September, Reading announced the signing of goalkeeper James Holden, winger Femi Azeez and forward Augustus McGiff to their academy.

On 20 September, Akin Odimayo joined Hungerford Town on a one-month loan deal.

On 25 September, Myles Roberts joined Bognor Regis Town on loan.

At the end of September, James Holden joined Bognor Regis Town on loan as cover for the injured Myles Roberts.

=== October ===
On 1 October, Yakou Méïté extended his contract with Reading until the summer of 2023.

On 4 October, after two clean sheets in two games for Bognor Regis Town, James Holden joined Bracknell Town on loan a short-term loan deal.

On 8 October, Reading announced the singing of Werick Caetano on a contract until the end of the season, with Caetano joining up with the U23.

On 9 October, Reading sacked manager José Gomes. On 14 October, Mark Bowen was appointed as Gomes' replacement moving down from the role of Sporting Director.

On 21 October, 17-year-old defender Jeriel Dorsett signed his first professional contract with the club until the summer of 2021.

On 26 October, Reading's away match against Nottingham Forest was postponed due to the adverse weather conditions in the East Midlands.

On 28 October, Gabriel Osho featured on trial for Ipswich Town U23's in their game against Coventry City.

=== November ===
On 12 November, Ramarni Medford-Smith joined Torquay United on loan until 1 January 2020, whilst Ben House joined Dagenham & Redbridge also on loan until 1 January 2020.

On 22 November, Jökull Andrésson signed a new contract with Reading, keeping him at the club until the summer of 2022.

On 26 November, Reading confirmed that Academy Manager Ged Roddy had left the club.

=== December ===
On 2 December, Reading were drawn at home to Blackpool in the Third Round of the 2019–20 FA Cup.

On 4 December, Reading announced that Michael Gilkes had been appointed as Academy Manager, after Ged Roddy left the club in November.

On 7 December, Reading confirmed that Gabriel Osho had joined Yeovil Town on loan until 4 January 2020.

On 16 December, Readings postponed match against Nottingham Forest on 26 October, was confirmed as being rearranged to 22 January 2020 at 19:45.

=== January ===
Reading began January with a 2–1 victory over Fulham at Craven Cottage thanks to goals from John Swift, his third goal in as many games, and Charlie Adam. Reading's second game of January came on 4 January at home to Blackpool in the Third Round of the FA Cup. Reading went behind to a 28th-minute goal from Nathan Delfouneso, before Sam Baldock equalised in the 56th. Armand Gnanduillet restored Blackpools lead in the 60th minute before Danny Loader equalised in the 66th. In the 68th minute Teddy Howe conceded a penalty, with Gnanduillet stepping up and trying a Panenka, which came back off the crossbar before being cleared, leaving the match to end 2–2.

On 6 January, Thierry Nevers signed his first professional contract with Reading, until the summer 2021.

On 9 January, Mark Bowen was nominated for the December Championship Manager of the Month, whilst Rafael Cabral was nominated for December Player of the Month.

On 17 January, Bowen extended his contract as Reading manager until the summer of 2021.

On 28 January, Conor Lawless signed a new contract with Reading, keeping him at the club until the summer of 2021.

==== Transfers ====
On 7 January, Josh Barrett left the club to join Bristol Rovers on a permanent contract, and João Virgínia returned to Everton. On 13 January, New Zealand international midfielder Matthew Ridenton joined Reading for a week-long trial. On 16 January, Jack Nolan moved to Walsall for an undisclosed fee.

On 21 January, Luke Southwood signed a new contract with Reading until the summer of 2021, and then returned to Hamilton Academical on loan until the end of the season.

On 30 January, Ben House returned to Dagenham & Redbridge on loan for the remainder of the season, U23 goalkeeper, Myles Roberts, left the club to sign for Watford, and Reading announced the signing of Felipe Araruna on a 2.5-year contract from São Paulo.

On 31 January, academy graduate Teddy Howe left to club to sign permanently with Blackpool, and Vito Mannone joined Esbjerg fB on loan for the remainder of the season. Later that same day, Reading announced that Marc McNulty had swapped a loan deal at Sunderland to join Hibernian until the end of the season, and that Ayub Masika had joined the club on loan from Beijing Renhe on loan until the end of the season.

=== February ===
On 8 February, Femi Azeez joined Bracknell Town on an initial 28-day loan deal.

On 11 February, Adam Liddle joined Derry City on loan until 30 June.

On 14 February, Akin Odimayo and Andre Burley both moved to Waterford on loan.

On 18 February, Imari Samuels signed his first professional contract with the club, keeping him at Reading until the summer of 2022, with Reading also confirming the signing of Joseph Ajose on a contract until the summer of 2021 after impressing on trial having left Port Vale.

=== March ===
On 2 March, Josh Hewitt signed his first professional contract, keeping him at Reading until the summer of 2021.

On 13 March, the EFL postponed all league fixtures until 3 April due to the COVID-19 pandemic.

On 19 March, the EFL postponed all league fixtures until 30 April due to the continuing coronavirus pandemic.

=== April ===
On 3 April, the EFL postponed all league fixtures indefinitely until it is safe to resume.

On 15 April, Reading announced that Chief Executive Nigel Howe and manager Mark Bowen agreed to defer a substantial percentage of their salary for April, May and June.

=== May ===
On 26 May, Reading's first team players agreed to a wage deferral for May, June and July.

On 29 May, Esbjerg fB announced that Vito Mannone's loan had been extended by a further month enabling him to finish the extended Danish Superliga season.

On 31 May, the EFL announced that the Championship had agreed to a provisional return date of 20 June to finish the season by 30 July, with the potential of Matchday squads being extended to 20 players, and 5 substitutions being permitted.

=== June ===
On 8 June, the EFL confirmed the revised schedule for the remaining nice games of the season.

On 18 June, Atlético Baleares announced that Jordan Holsgrove had returned to Reading, after they declined to extend Holsgrove's loan until the end of the Segunda División B play-offs.

On 26 June, Reading agreed contract extensions until the end of the season with Chris Gunter, Jordan Obita, Tyler Blackett, Gabriel Osho, Garath McCleary and Charlie Adam whilst it was announced that Danny Loader had turned down the contract extension, therefor leaving the club on 30 June 2020.

=== July ===
On 1 July, AS Monaco confirmed that the loan deals for Pelé's loan deal with Reading had been extended until the end of the season.

On 2 July Reading announced that Coniah Boyce-Clarke, James Holden and Augustus McGiff had all professional terms with the club, whilst Femi Azeez had signed a new one-year contract after previous deal had expired on 30 June. It was also confirmed that all five loan players, Lucas Boyé, Ovie Ejaria, Pelé, Ayub Masika and Matt Miazga, had extended their stay until the end of the season. Whilst the club confirmed that Liam Driscoll, Lexus Beeden, Andre Burley, Marcel Elva-Fountaine, Ramarni Medford-Smith, Akin Odimayo, Emmanuel Obamakinwa, Werick Caetano, Ethan Coleman, Tyler Frost, Pedro Neves, Roberto Nditi, Ben House and Adam Liddle had all left the club after their contracts had expired.

On 20 July, Reading confirmed the permanent transfer of Modou Barrow to Jeonbuk Hyundai Motors.

Ahead of the final game of the season, on 22 July, Rafael Cabral was announced as the player of the season.

On 25 July, Reading confirmed that Chris Gunter, Jordan Obita, Tyler Blackett, Garath McCleary and Charlie Adam would all be leaving the club when their contracts expired at the end of the month, whilst Gabriel Osho had been offered a new contract by the club.

== Transfers ==
=== In ===
Date	Position	Nationality	Name	From	Fee	Ref.
19 July 2019	DF	(England)	Michael Morrison	Birmingham City	Free	
22 July 2019	MF	(Scotland)	Charlie Adam	Stoke City	Free	
6 August 2019	GK	(Brazil)	Rafael	Sampdoria	Free	
6 August 2019	FW	(Portugal)	Lucas João	Sheffield Wednesday	Undisclosed	
7 August 2019	FW	(Romania)	George Pușcaș	Internazionale	Undisclosed	
8 August 2019	DF	(England)	Lexus Beeden	Tooting & Mitcham	Undisclosed	
18 September 2019	GK	(England)	James Holden	Bury	Free	
18 September 2019	MF	(England)	Femi Azeez	Wealdstone	Free	
18 September 2019	FW	(United States)	Augustus McGiff	New York City Academy	Undisclosed	
8 October 2019	MF	(Brazil)	Werick Caetano	Vasco da Gama	Undisclosed	
30 January 2020	MF	(Brazil)	Felipe Araruna	São Paulo	Undisclosed	
18 February 2020	MF	(England)	Joseph Ajose	Port Vale	Free	

=== Loans in ===
Start date	Position	Nationality	Name	From	End date	Ref.
11 July 2019	GK	(Portugal)	João Virgínia	Everton	7 January 2020	
24 July 2019	DF	(United States)	Matt Miazga	Chelsea	End of Season	
2 August 2019	FW	(Argentina)	Lucas Boyé	Torino	End of Season	
6 August 2019	MF	(Guinea-Bissau)	Pelé	AS Monaco	End of Season	
8 August 2019	MF	(England)	Ovie Ejaria	Liverpool	End of Season	
31 January 2020	FW	(Kenya)	Ayub Masika	Beijing Renhe	End of Season	

=== Out ===
Date	Position	Nationality	Name	To	Fee	Ref.
20 June 2019	GK	(England)	Lewis Ward	Exeter City	Undisclosed	
8 July 2019	MF	(Republic of Ireland)	Liam Kelly	Feyenoord	Undisclosed	
12 July 2019	FW	(Iceland)	Jón Daði Böðvarsson	Millwall	Undisclosed	
5 August 2019	GK	(England)	Adam Desbois	Brighton & Hove Albion	Undisclosed	
2 September 2019	FW	(United States)	Andrija Novakovich	Frosinone	Undisclosed	
7 January 2020	MF	(Republic of Ireland)	Josh Barrett	Bristol Rovers	Undisclosed	
16 January 2020	FW	(England)	Jack Nolan	Walsall	Undisclosed	
30 January 2020	GK	(England)	Myles Roberts	Watford	Undisclosed	
31 January 2020	DF	(England)	Teddy Howe	Blackpool	Undisclosed	
20 July 2020	FW	(The Gambia)	Modou Barrow	Jeonbuk Hyundai Motors	Undisclosed	

=== Loans out ===
Start date	Position	Nationality	Name	To	End date	Ref.
10 February 2019	GK	(Italy)	Vito Mannone	Minnesota United	1 January 2020	
26 February 2019	FW	(Nigeria)	Sone Aluko	Beijing Renhe	1 January 2020	
24 July 2019	FW	(Scotland)	Marc McNulty	Sunderland	31 January 2019	
30 July 2019	GK	(Australia)	Liam Driscoll	Yeovil Town	13 August 2019	
August 2019	GK	(England)	Myles Roberts	Tonbridge Angels	September 2019	
1 August 2019	GK	(England)	Luke Southwood	Hamilton Academical	5 January 2020	
2 August 2019	FW	(England)	Sam Smith	Cambridge United	End of Season	
12 August 2019	FW	(The Gambia)	Modou Barrow	Denizlispor	31 May 2020	
16 August 2019	MF	(Romania)	Adrian Popa	FCSB	End of Season	
27 August 2019	MF	(Scotland)	Jordan Holsgrove	Atlético Baleares	18 June 2020	
30 August 2019	DF	(England)	Tennai Watson	Coventry City	2 January 2020	
2 September 2019	DF	(England)	Tom Holmes	Roeselare	End of Season	
20 September 2019	DF	(England)	Akin Odimayo	Hungerford Town	20 October 2019	
25 September 2019	GK	(England)	Myles Roberts	Bognor Regis Town		
28 September 2019	GK	(England)	James Holden	Bognor Regis Town		
4 October 2019	GK	(England)	James Holden	Bracknell Town		
12 November 2019	DF	(England)	Ramarni Medford-Smith	Torquay United	1 January 2020	
12 November 2019	FW	(Scotland)	Ben House	Dagenham & Redbridge	1 January 2020	
7 December 2019	DF	(England)	Gabriel Osho	Yeovil Town	4 January 2020	
21 January 2020	GK	(England)	Luke Southwood	Hamilton Academical	End of Season	
30 January 2020	FW	(Scotland)	Ben House	Dagenham & Redbridge	End of Season	
31 January 2020	GK	(Italy)	Vito Mannone	Esbjerg fB	End of Season	
31 January 2020	FW	(Scotland)	Marc McNulty	Hibernian	End of Season	
8 February 2020	MF	(England)	Femi Azeez	Bracknell Town	6 March 2020	
11 February 2020	FW	(England)	Adam Liddle	Derry City	30 June 2020	
14 February 2020	DF	(Saint Kitts and Nevis)	Andre Burley	Waterford	30 June 2020	
14 February 2020	DF	(England)	Akin Odimayo	Waterford	30 June 2020	

=== Released ===
Date	Position	Nationality	Name	Joined	Date	Ref
8 July 2019	DF	(Netherlands)	Darren Sidoel	Arda Kardzhali	8 August 2019	
31 July 2019	MF	(Republic of Ireland)	David Meyler	Retired	30 August 2019	
4 September 2019	MF	(England)	Fabio Sole	Oxford United	4 September 2019	
30 June 2020	GK	(Australia)	Liam Driscoll	Bayswater City		
30 June 2020	GK	(Italy)	Vito Mannone	AS Monaco	11 September 2020	
30 June 2020	DF	(England)	Lexus Beeden	Welling United	3 October 2020	
30 June 2020	DF	(England)	Marcel Elva-Fountaine	Burnley U23	17 August 2020	
30 June 2020	DF	(England)	Ramarni Medford-Smith	Marlow	19 September 2020	
30 June 2020	DF	(England)	Roberto Nditi	Bracknell Town	12 September 2020	
30 June 2020	DF	(England)	Emmanuel Obamakinwa	Wembley		
30 June 2020	DF	(England)	Akin Odimayo	Swindon Town	18 August 2020	
30 June 2020	DF	(Saint Kitts and Nevis)	Andre Burley	Wycombe Wanderers	29 September 2020	
30 June 2020	MF	(Brazil)	Werick Caetano	Miedź Legnica	26 February 2021	
30 June 2020	MF	(Brazil)	Pedro Neves	Cartagena	10 August 2020	
30 June 2020	MF	(England)	Ethan Coleman	Brackley Town	19 September 2020	
30 June 2020	MF	(England)	Tyler Frost	Crawley Town	1 August 2020	
30 June 2020	MF	(Romania)	Adrian Popa	Voluntari	16 October 2020	
30 June 2020	FW	(Cameroon)	Danny Loader	Porto	20 August 2020	
30 June 2020	FW	(England)	Adam Liddle	Chelmsford City	29 July 2020	
30 June 2020	FW	(Scotland)	Ben House	Eastleigh	12 August 2020	
31 July 2020	DF	(England)	Tyler Blackett	Nottingham Forest	15 August 2020	
31 July 2020	DF	(England)	Gabriel Osho	Luton Town	18 November 2020	
31 July 2020	DF	(England)	Jordan Obita	Oxford United	9 November 2020	
31 July 2020	DF	(Wales)	Chris Gunter	Charlton Athletic	8 October 2020	
31 July 2020	MF	(Jamaica)	Garath McCleary	Wycombe Wanderers	4 November 2020	
31 July 2020	MF	(Scotland)	Charlie Adam	Dundee	15 September 2020	

=== Trial ===
Date from	Position	Nationality	Name	Date to	Ref
1 July 2019	MF	(England)	Denzeil Boadu		
September 2019	MF	(Brazil)	Werick Caetano	8 October 2019	
October 2019	FW	(France)	Emmanuel Samba		
13 January 2020	MF	(New Zealand)	Matthew Ridenton	17 January 2020	

== Squad ==
As of match played 22 July 2020

No.	Name	Nationality	Position	Date of birth (age)	Signed from	Signed in	Contract ends	Apps.	Goals
Goalkeepers
1	Sam Walker	(England)	GK	2 October 1991 (aged 28)	Colchester United	2018	2021	14	0
33	Rafael Cabral	(Brazil)	GK	20 May 1990 (aged 30)	Sampdoria	2019	2022	46	0
40	Jökull Andrésson	(Iceland)	GK	25 August 2001 (aged 18)	Academy	2018	2022	0	0
43	Luke Southwood (Note: Luke Southwood was born in Oxford, England, representing England at U20 level before going on to make his international debut for Northern Ireland in March 2022.)	(England)	GK	6 December 1997 (aged 22)	Academy	2016	2021	0	0
Defenders
2	Chris Gunter	(Wales)	DF	21 July 1989 (aged 31)	Nottingham Forest	2012	2020	314	4
4	Michael Morrison	(England)	DF	3 March 1988 (aged 32)	Birmingham City	2019	2021	48	2
5	Matt Miazga	(United States)	DF	19 July 1995 (aged 25)	loan from Chelsea	2019	2020	42	2
6	Liam Moore (Note: Liam Moore was born in Loughborough, England, but qualified to represent Jamaica, and made his international debut for Jamaica in March 2021.)	(England)	DF	31 January 1993 (aged 27)	Leicester City	2016	2023	181	6
11	Jordan Obita (Note: Obita was born in Oxford, England, but qualified to represent Uganda and made his international debut for Uganda in June 2025.)	(England)	DF	8 December 1993 (aged 26)	Academy	2010	2020	191	7
16	Tom McIntyre (Note: Tom McIntyre was born in Reading, England, but qualified to represent Scotland, representing them at U17, U20 and U21 level.)	(Scotland)	DF	6 November 1998 (aged 21)	Academy	2016	2021	16	0
17	Andy Yiadom (Note: Andy Yiadom was born in Holloway, England, but qualified to represent Ghana and made his international debut for Ghana in January 2017. He previously represented England at C level.)	(Ghana)	DF	2 December 1991 (aged 28)	Barnsley	2018	2022	73	2
24	Tyler Blackett	(England)	DF	2 April 1994 (aged 26)	Manchester United	2016	2020	122	0
27	Omar Richards	(England)	DF	15 February 1998 (aged 22)	Academy	2016	2021	62	3
30	Tennai Watson	(England)	DF	4 March 1997 (aged 23)	Academy	2015	2021	7	0
34	Gabriel Osho (Note: Osho was born in Reading, England, but qualified to represent Nigeria and made his international debut for Nigeria in November 2024.)	(England)	DF	14 August 1997 (aged 22)	Academy	2016	2020	10	0
46	Jeriel Dorsett (Note: Jeriel Dorsett was born in Enfield, England, but qualified to represent Montserrat and made his international debut for Montserrat in September 2023. He previously represented England at U18 level.)	(England)	DF	4 May 2002 (aged 18)	Academy	2018	2021	1	0
	Tom Holmes	(England)	DF	12 March 2000 (aged 20)	Academy	2017	2022	1	0
Midfielders
8	Andy Rinomhota (Note: Rinomhota was born in Leeds, England, but qualified to represent Zimbabwe and made his international debut for Zimbabwe in November 2023.)	(England)	MF	21 April 1997 (aged 23)	Academy	2017	2022	75	3
10	John Swift	(England)	MF	23 June 1995 (aged 25)	Chelsea	2016	2022	150	22
12	Garath McCleary (Note: Garath McCleary was born in Oxford, England, but qualified to represent Jamaica and made his international debut for Jamaica in February 2013.)	(Jamaica)	MF	15 May 1987 (aged 33)	Nottingham Forest	2012	2020	270	27
14	Ovie Ejaria	(England)	MF	18 November 1997 (aged 22)	loan from Liverpool	2019	2020	56	4
20	Felipe Araruna	(Brazil)	MF	12 March 1996 (aged 24)	São Paulo	2020	2022	3	0
21	Michael Olise (Note: Michael Olise qualifies to represent England, Nigeria and France, making his international debut for France U18 in June 2019 at the 2019 Toulon Tournament.)	(France)	MF	12 December 2001 (aged 18)	Academy	2018	2022	27	0
26	Charlie Adam	(Scotland)	MF	10 December 1985 (aged 34)	Stoke City	2019	2020	27	2
28	Jordan Holsgrove	(Scotland)	MF	10 September 1999 (aged 20)	Academy	2017	2021	0	0
29	Pelé (Note: Pelé was born in Agualva-Cacém, Portugal, but qualified to represent Guinea-Bissau and made his international debut for Guinea-Bissau in June 2017. He previously represented Portugal at various youth levels.)	(Guinea-Bissau)	MF	29 September 1991 (aged 28)	loan from AS Monaco	2019	2020	34	1
32	Ryan East	(England)	MF	7 August 1998 (aged 21)	Academy	2016	2021	1	0
Forwards
9	Sam Baldock	(England)	FW	15 March 1989 (aged 31)	Brighton & Hove Albion	2018	2021	51	11
18	Lucas Boyé	(Argentina)	FW	28 February 1996 (aged 24)	loan from Torino	2019	2020	24	2
19	Yakou Méïté (Note: Yakou Méïte was born in Paris, France, but qualified to represent the Ivory Coast, representing the Ivory Coast at U17, U20 and U23 level.)	(Ivory Coast)	FW	11 February 1996 (aged 24)	Paris Saint-Germain	2016	2023	100	31
23	Sone Aluko (Note: Sone Aluko was born in Hounslow, England, but qualified to represent Nigeria and made his international debut for Nigeria in May 2009. He previously represented Nigeria at U20 and U23 level and England at U16, U17, U18 and U19 level.)	(Nigeria)	FW	19 February 1989 (aged 31)	Fulham	2017	2021	66	4
25	Ayub Masika	(Kenya)	FW	10 September 1992 (aged 27)	loan from Beijing Renhe	2020	2020	6	0
31	Lucas João (Note: Lucas João was born in Lisbon, Portugal, and represented Portugal twice in Friendly matches in 2015, before switching international allegiances to Angola in 2022, making his debut for against Guinea-Bissau in March 2022.)	(Portugal)	FW	4 September 1993 (aged 26)	Sheffield Wednesday	2019	2023	19	6
38	Thierry Nevers	(England)	FW	5 February 2001 (aged 19)	Academy	2018	2021	0	0
47	George Pușcaș	(Romania)	FW	8 April 1996 (aged 24)	Inter Milan	2019	2024	42	14
	Sam Smith	(England)	FW	8 March 1998 (aged 22)	Academy	2016	2021	12	2
	Marc McNulty	(Scotland)	FW	14 September 1992 (aged 27)	Coventry City	2018	2022	15	1
U23
	Coniah Boyce-Clarke (Note: Coniah Boyce-Clarke was born in England, but qualified to represent Jamaica, and made his international debut for Jamaica U20 in June 2022.)	(England)	GK	1 March 2003 (aged 17)	Academy	2019		0	0
	James Holden	(England)	GK	4 September 2001 (aged 18)	Bury	2019		0	0
	Morgan Kealy	(England)	GK	16 January 2003 (aged 16)	Academy	2018	2020	0	0
	Ethan Bristow (Note: Ethan Bristow was born in England, but qualified to represent Saint Kitts and Nevis, and made his international debut for Saint Kitts and Nevis in November 2023.)	(England)	DF	27 November 2001 (aged 17)	Academy	2018	2020	0	0
	Josh Hewitt	(England)	DF	19 September 2001 (aged 18)	Academy	2018	2021	0	0
	Femi Azeez (Note: Azeez was born in Westminster, England, but qualified to represent Nigeria and made his international debut for Nigeria in May 2026.)	(England)	MF	5 June 2001 (aged 19)	Wealdstone	2019	2021	0	0
	Conor Lawless	(England)	MF	13 September 2001 (aged 18)	Academy	2018	2021	0	0
	Oliver Pendlebury	(England)	MF	19 January 2002 (aged 18)	Academy	2018	2020	0	0
	Kian Leavy	(Republic of Ireland)	MF	21 March 2002 (aged 17)	Academy	2018	2020	0	0
Left during the season
7	Modou Barrow	(The Gambia)	FW	13 October 1992 (aged 27)	Swansea City	2017	2021	83	14
15	Danny Loader (Note: Loader was born in Reading, England, but qualified to represent Cameroon, and made his international debut for Cameroon in March 2025 having previously represented England various youth level.)	(England)	FW	28 August 2000 (aged 19)	Academy	2016	2020	35	2
20	João Virgínia	(Portugal)	GK	10 October 1999 (aged 20)	loan from Everton	2019	2020	3	0
22	Teddy Howe	(England)	DF	9 October 1998 (aged 21)	Academy	2017	2021	6	0
23	Andrija Novakovich	(United States)	FW	21 September 1996 (aged 23)	University School of Milwaukee	2014	2020	3	0
25	Adrian Popa	(Romania)	MF	24 July 1988 (aged 31)	FCSB	2017	2020	17	1
35	Akin Odimayo	(England)	DF	28 November 1999 (aged 20)	Academy	2016	2020	1	0
36	Ramarni Medford-Smith	(England)	DF	21 October 1998 (aged 21)	Academy	2017	2020	1	0
37	Tyler Frost	(England)	MF	7 August 1999 (aged 20)	Academy	2017	2020	0	0
39	Josh Barrett (Note: Jost Barrett was born in Oxford, England, but qualified to represent the Republic of Ireland, representing the Republic of Ireland at U16, U17, U19 and U21 level.)	(Republic of Ireland)	MF	21 June 1998 (aged 22)	Academy	2015	2021	13	2
41	Ethan Coleman	(England)	MF	28 January 2000 (aged 20)	Academy	2016	2020	0	0
42	Andre Burley (Note: Burley was born in Slough, England, but qualified to represent Saint Kitts and Nevis, and made his international debut for Saint Kitts and Nevis in March 2021.)	(Saint Kitts and Nevis)	DF	10 September 1999 (aged 20)	Academy	2016	2020	3	0
45	Ben House (Note: House was born in Guildford, England, but qualified to represent Scotland, and made his debut for Scotland U20 in March 2019.)	(Scotland)	FW	5 July 1999 (aged 21)	Academy	2017	2020	1	0
	Liam Driscoll	(Australia)	GK	8 May 1999 (aged 21)	Academy	2017	2020	0	0
	Myles Roberts	(England)	GK	9 December 2001 (aged 18)	Academy	2018	2020	0	0
	Vito Mannone	(Italy)	GK	2 March 1988 (aged 32)	Sunderland	2017	2020	47	0
	Lexus Beeden	(England)	DF	10 February 2000 (aged 20)	Academy	2019		0	0
	Marcel Elva-Fountaine	(England)	DF	14 November 2000 (aged 19)	Academy	2019	2020	0	0
	Roberto Nditi	(England)	DF	1 October 2000 (aged 19)	Academy	2019	2020	0	0
	Emmanuel Obamakinwa	(England)	DF	30 November 2000 (aged 19)	Academy	2019	2020	0	0
	Werick Caetano	(Brazil)	MF	25 April 1999 (aged 21)	Vasco da Gama	2019	2020	0	0
	Pedro Neves	(Brazil)	MF	5 September 2001 (aged 18)	Everton	2019	2020	0	0
	Fabio Sole	(England)	MF	6 September 2001 (aged 17)	Academy	2018	2020	0	0
	Adam Liddle	(England)	FW	26 October 1999 (aged 20)	Academy	2018	2020	0	0
	Jack Nolan	(England)	FW	25 May 2001 (aged 19)	Academy	2019		0	0

== Friendlies ==
6 July 2019	Reading	2–0	Southend United	Wokingham
12:00 BST (UTC+1)	Olise 29'; Barrow 50'	Report		Stadium: Hogwood Park; Attendance: Behind Closed Doors

10 July 2019	Gibraltar United	0–10	(England) Reading	Marbella, Spain
18:30 BST (UTC+1)		Report	J.Holsgrove 6', 35'; Novakovich 35'; Méïté 55' (pen.), 83'; Loader 57', 69', 87'; McIntyre 75'; Barrett 88'	Stadium: Marbella Football Center
Note: Match originally scheduled against Europa, but changed on 8 July due to Europa's involvement in the UEFA Europa League.

13 July 2019	Sevilla (Spain)	2–1	(England) Reading	San José de la Rinconada, Spain
20:00 BST (UTC+1)	Nolito 66' (pen.); Lara 86'	Report	Novakovich 57'	Stadium: Estadio Municipal "Felipe del Valle"

16 July 2019	Malaga B (Spain)	0–0	(England) Reading	Marbella, Spain
9:00 BST (UTC+1)		Report		Stadium: Marbella Football Center

16 July 2019	Extremadura (Spain)	0–1	(England) Reading	Marbella, Spain
18:30 BST (UTC+1)		Report	Loader 60' (pen.)	Stadium: Marbella Football Center

20 July 2019	Lincoln City (England)	1–0	(England) Reading	Marbella, Spain
11:00 CEST	Anderson 88'	Report		Stadium: Marbella Football Center

20 July 2019	Granada (Spain)	1–0	(England) Reading	Marbella, Spain
18:30 BST (UTC+1)	Azeez 79'	Report		Stadium: Estadio Municipal de Marbella

24 July 2019	Reading	1–1	Birmingham City	Wokingham
12:00 BST (UTC+1)	Novakovich 87'	Report	Mrabti 67'	Stadium: Hogwood Park
Note: Match behind closed doors

24 July 2019	Reading	4–2	Peterborough United	Reading
16:00 BST (UTC+1)	Blackett 20'; Barrow 38'; Swift 52'; Barrett 61'	Report	Toney 43'; Eisa 50'	Stadium: Madejski Stadium

28 July 2019	Reading	3–4	Chelsea	Reading
15:00 BST (UTC+1)	Barrett 13'; Morrison 49'; Baldock 71'	Report	Barkley 22'; Kenedy 42'; Mount 57', 60'	Stadium: Madejski Stadium; Attendance: 19,463; Referee: Tim Robinson

10 June 2020	Chelsea	1–0	Reading	Cobham
BST (UTC+1)	Pedro	Report		Stadium: Cobham Training Centre; Attendance: 0
Note: Match behind closed doors

14 June 2020	Reading	3–1	Portsmouth	Reading
BST (UTC+1)	João; Richards; Olise	Report	Hawkins	Stadium: Madejski Stadium; Attendance: 0
Note: Match behind closed doors

22 June 2020	Reading	2–1	Oxford United	Reading
BST (UTC+1)	McCleary; Loader; Baldock (penalty missed)	Report	Woodburn	Stadium: Bearwood Park

=== U23 ===
6 July 2019	Salisbury	1–0	Reading U23	Salisbury
15:00 BST (UTC+1)	D.Young 84'	Report		Stadium: Raymond McEnhill Stadium

17 July 2019	Tooting & Mitcham United	3–2	Reading U23	Morden, London
BST (UTC+1)				Stadium: Imperial Fields

27 July 2019	Reading U23	3–0	QPR
BST (UTC+1)	A.Liddle

27 July 2019	Olympiacos U19 (Greece)	v	(England) Reading U23	West Bridgford
13:00 BST (UTC+1)				Stadium: Nottingham Forest Training Centre

30 July 2019	Reading U23	1–2	West Ham United U23	Wokingham
13:00 BST (UTC+1)	33'		Holland 23'; Scully 76'	Stadium: Hogwood Park; Attendance: Behind Closed Doors

6 August 2019	KSV Roeselare (Belgium)	1–2	(England) Reading U23	Roeselare, Belgium
14:00 BST (UTC+1)	Túlio 11'	Report	Odimayo 31'; Popa 37'	Stadium: Schiervelde Stadion

== Competitions ==
=== League table ===
Pos	Team	Pld	W	D	L	GF	GA	GD	Pts
11	Blackburn Rovers	46	17	12	17	66	63	+3	63
12	Bristol City	46	17	12	17	60	65	−5	63
13	Queens Park Rangers	46	16	10	20	67	76	−9	58
14	Reading	46	15	11	20	59	58	+1	56
15	Stoke City	46	16	8	22	62	68	−6	56
16	Sheffield Wednesday	46	15	11	20	58	66	−8	56
17	Middlesbrough	46	13	14	19	48	61	−13	53

Source: EFL Official Website
Rules for classification: 1) Points; 2) Goal difference; 3) Number of goals scored; 4) Head-to-head results; 5) Wins; 6) Away goals; 7) Penalty points (sec 9.5); 8) 12-point sending off offences

==== Result summary ====
Overall								Home						Away					
Pld	W	D	L	GF	GA	GD	Pts	W	D	L	GF	GA	GD	W	D	L	GF	GA	GD
46	15	11	20	58	59	−1	56	7	4	12	26	34	−8	8	7	8	32	25	+7

Last updated: 22 July 2020.
Source: Results

==== Results by matchday ====
Round	1	2	3	4	5	6	7	8	9	10	11	12	13	14	15	16	17	18	19	20	21	22	23	24	25	26	27	28	29	30	31	32	33	34	35	36	37	38	39	40	41	42	43	44	45	46
Ground	H	A	H	A	A	H	A	H	A	H	A	H	A	H	H	A	H	A	H	A	A	H	H	A	A	H	A	A	H	A	H	H	A	A	H	H	A	H	A	H	A	H	A	H	A	H
Result	L	L	W	D	W	L	L	L	D	L	L	W	D	W	W	L	L	W	L	D	D	W	W	W	W	D	L	D	L	D	D	L	W	L	L	W	W	D	L	L	W	D	W	L	L	L
Position	24	22	17	15	11	16	17	20	20	21	22	20	20	19	17	18	18	18	18	18	18	16	15	14	14	14	16	15	15	15	16	16	15	16	16	16	14	14	15	16	14	13	13	14	15	14

Updated to match(es) played on 22 July 2020. Source: 11v11
A = Away; H = Home; W = Win; D = Draw; L = Loss; P = Postponed

==== Results ====
3 August 2019 1	Reading	1–3	Sheffield Wednesday	Reading
15:00 BST (UTC+1)	Méïté 54'	Report	Harris 30'; Fletcher (yellow card) 44'; Hutchinson 56' (yellow card) 77'; Reach (yellow card) 61'; Westwood (red card) 80'; João 90+7'	Stadium: Madejski Stadium; Attendance: 16,319; Referee: James Linington

10 August 2019 2	Hull City	2–1	Reading	Kingston upon Hull
15:00 BST (UTC+1)	Bowen 6'; Irvine 16' de Wijs (yellow card) 30'; Kingsley (yellow card) 90'	Report	Boyé (yellow card) 39'; Yiadom (yellow card) 60'; João 66'	Stadium: KCOM Stadium; Attendance: 10,673; Referee: Matt Donohue

18 August 2019 3	Reading	3–0	Cardiff City	Reading
12:00 BST (UTC+1)	Pușcaș 25', 40'; Moore (yellow card) 43'; Swift 83'	Report	Bacuna (yellow card) 7'; Ralls (yellow card) 45'	Stadium: Madejski Stadium; Attendance: 14,252; Referee: Andy Davies

21 August 2019 4	West Bromwich Albion	1–1	Reading	West Bromwich
19:45 BST (UTC+1)	Gibbs (yellow card) 40'; Sawyers (yellow card) 49'; Zohore 88' (pen.)	Report	Yiadom (yellow card) 50'; Ejaria 71'; Adam (yellow card) 90+4'	Stadium: The Hawthorns; Attendance: 21,803; Referee: Peter Bankes

24 August 2019 5	Huddersfield Town	0–2	Reading	Huddersfield
15:00 BST (UTC+1)	Brown (yellow card) 40'	Report	Richards (yellow card) 30'; Ejaria 71'; Morrison 84'	Stadium: John Smith’s Stadium; Attendance: 21,847; Referee: Tony Harrington

31 August 2019 6	Reading	0–2	Charlton Athletic	Reading
15:00 BST (UTC+1)	Pelé (yellow card) 25'	Report	Field (yellow card) 10'; Leko 51'; Pratley (yellow card) 77'; Taylor 80' (pen.); Gallagher (yellow card) 84'	Stadium: Madejski Stadium; Attendance: 16,906; Referee: Jarred Gillett

14 September 2019 7	Middlesbrough	1–0	Reading	Middlesbrough
15:00 BST (UTC+1)	Johnson 59'	Report	McIntyre (yellow card) 27'; Boyé (yellow card) 44'; Morrison (yellow card) 58'	Stadium: Riverside Stadium; Attendance: 19,414; Referee: Robert Jones

21 September 2019 8	Reading	1–2	Blackburn Rovers	Reading
15:00 BST (UTC+1)	Yiadom (yellow card) 32'; Morrison (yellow card) 37'; Swift 57'	Report	Armstrong 8'; Dack 48'; Cunningham (yellow card) 79'; Bennett (yellow card) 90+3'	Stadium: Madejski Stadium; Attendance: 16,906; Referee: Matt Donohue

28 September 2019 9	Swansea City	1–1	Reading	Swansea
15:00 BST (UTC+1)	Borja 3'	Report	Boyé (yellow card) 27'; Moore (yellow card) 48'; Rinomhota (yellow card) 73'; Yiadom 90'	Stadium: Liberty Stadium; Attendance: 16,036; Referee: Keith Stroud

1 October 2019 10	Reading	1–4	Fulham	Reading
20:00 BST (UTC+1)	Swift (yellow card) 5' (yellow-red card) 20'; Moore (yellow card) 71'; Méïté 89'	Report	Cairney 13', 67'; Mitrović 26', 29'	Stadium: Madejski Stadium; Attendance: 13,809; Referee: Andy Woolmer

5 October 2019 11	Bristol City	1–0	Reading	Bristol
15:00 BST (UTC+1)	Diédhiou 12'; Rowe (yellow card) 18'	Report	Moore (yellow card) 65'; Rinomhota (yellow card) 74'	Stadium: Ashton Gate; Attendance: 21,419; Referee: Steve Martin

19 October 2019 12	Reading	1–0	Preston North End	Reading
15:00 BST (UTC+1)	Obita (yellow card) 8'; Miazga 90+8' (yellow card) 90+8'	Report	Nugent (yellow card) 16'; Pearson (yellow card) 90+1'	Stadium: Madejski Stadium; Attendance: 14,135; Referee: Dean Whitestone

22 October 2019 13	Queens Park Rangers	2–2	Reading	Shepherd's Bush
19:45 BST (UTC+1)	Wells 29'; Hugill 58' (yellow card) 90'; Eze (yellow card) 90+5'	Report	Pușcaș 31'; Rinomhota (yellow card) 56'; Baldock 74'; Miazga (yellow card) 90'	Stadium: Loftus Road; Attendance: 12,330; Referee: Jeremy Simpson

26 October 2019 14	Nottingham Forest	v	Reading	West Bridgford
15:00 BST (UTC+1)				Stadium: City Ground
Note: Match postponed due to adverse weather conditions at the City Ground.

2 November 2019 15	Reading	2–1	Millwall	Reading
15:00 GMT (UTC)	Obita 9'; Baldock 37'; Yiadom (yellow card) 41'	Report	J.Wallace 63'	Stadium: Madejski Stadium; Attendance: 14,485; Referee: Tony Harrington

9 November 2019 16	Reading	3–0	Luton Town	Reading
15:00 GMT (UTC)	Morrison 22'; Ejaria 30'; McCleary 79'	Report	Bolton (yellow card) 25'	Stadium: Madejski Stadium; Attendance: 15,251; Referee: Andy Woolmer

23 November 2019 17	Brentford	1–0	Reading	Brentford
15:00 GMT (UTC)	Jansson (yellow card) 9'; Watkins 62'; Dasilva (yellow card) 78'; Jensen (yellow card) 82'	Report	Yiadom (yellow card) 4'; Swift (yellow card) 29'; Méïté (yellow card) 79'	Stadium: Griffin Park; Attendance: 11,892; Referee: David Coote

26 November 2019 18	Reading	0–1	Leeds United	Reading
20:00 GMT (UTC)	Richards (yellow card) 44'	Report	Ayling (yellow card) 40'; Harrison 87'	Stadium: Madejski Stadium; Attendance: 16,918; Referee: Darren Bond

30 November 2019 19	Wigan Athletic	1–3	Reading	Wigan
15:00 GMT (UTC)	Mulgrew (yellow card) 7'; Garner 34' (yellow card) 79'	Report	Morrison (yellow card) 43'; Pușcaș 79' (pen.), 80', 84' (yellow card) 81'	Stadium: DW Stadium; Attendance: 8,965; Referee: Jeremy Simpson

7 December 2019 20	Reading	2–3	Birmingham City	Reading
15:00 GMT (UTC)	Méïté 45'; Pușcaș (yellow card) 90'; João 90+5'	Report	Morrison 41' (o.g.); Bela 59'; McEachran (yellow card) 62'; Álvaro 88'	Stadium: Madejski Stadium; Attendance: 14,103; Referee: Tim Robinson

11 December 2019 21	Barnsley	1–1	Reading	Barnsley
19:45 GMT (UTC)	Woodrow 58'; Sibbick (yellow card) 62'; Dougall (yellow card) 81'	Report	Morrison (yellow card) 45+1'; João 76'	Stadium: Oakwell; Attendance: 11,510; Referee: Matt Donohue

14 December 2019 22	Stoke City	0–0	Reading	Stoke-on-Trent
15:00 GMT (UTC)	McClean (yellow card) 90'	Report	Adam (yellow card) 36'; Pelé (yellow card) 47'; Moore (yellow card) 85'	Stadium: bet365 Stadium; Attendance: 21,701; Referee: Lee Mason

21 December 2019 23	Reading	3–0	Derby County	Reading
15:00 GMT (UTC)	Adam 5' (pen.) (yellow card) 62'; João 58'; Blackett (yellow card) 82'; Méïté 86' (pen.)	Report	Malone (red card) 4'; Lawrence (yellow card) 36'; Knight (yellow card) 55'; Lowe (yellow card) 60'; Holmes (yellow card) 74'; Bogle (yellow card) 80'; Sibley (yellow card) 82'; Forsyth (yellow card) 86'	Stadium: Madejski Stadium; Attendance: 14,831; Referee: Michael Salisbury

26 December 2019 24	Reading	1–0	Queens Park Rangers	Reading
19:30 GMT (UTC)	Swift 52'; Gunter (yellow card) 74'	Report		Stadium: Madejski Stadium; Attendance: 12,495; Referee: James Linington

29 December 2019 25	Preston North End	0–2	Reading	Preston
15:00 GMT (UTC)		Report	Swift 12'; João 16'	Stadium: Deepdale; Attendance: 13,680; Referee: Jarred Gillett

1 January 2020 26	Fulham	1–2	Reading	Fulham
15:00 GMT (UTC)	Bryan (yellow card) 45'; Cavaleiro 61' (yellow card) 62'; Mitrović (yellow card) 73'; Knockaert (yellow card) 90+2'	Report	Swift 14'; Adam 48'; Pelé (yellow card) 68'; João (yellow card) 76'; Morrison (yellow card) 90+2'	Stadium: Craven Cottage; Attendance: 18,575; Referee: Geoff Eltringham

11 January 2020 27	Reading	1–1	Nottingham Forest	Reading
15:00 GMT (UTC)	Swift (yellow card) 38'; Méïté (yellow card) 87'; Rafael (yellow card) 90+6'; Figueiredo 90+7' (o.g.); Blackett (yellow card) 90+7'	Report	Silva (yellow card) 45+1'; Watson (yellow card) 90+2' (goal) 90+6'	Stadium: Madejski Stadium; Attendance: 16,602; Referee: Dean Whitestone

18 January 2020 28	Millwall	2–0	Reading	Bermondsey
15:00 GMT (UTC)	Bradshaw (yellow card) 19'; Smith 71'; Böðvarsson 82'	Report	Adam (yellow card) 33'; Ejaria (yellow card) 70'; Morrison (yellow card) 80'	Stadium: The Den; Attendance: 14,011; Referee: Keith Stroud

22 January 2020 14	Nottingham Forest	1–1	Reading	West Bridgford
19:45 GMT (UTC)	Ribeiro (yellow card) 66'; Grabban 80'	Report	Pelé (yellow card) 23'; Ejaria (yellow card) 72'; Baldock 84'	Stadium: City Ground; Attendance: 26,840; Referee: David Webb
Note: Match original scheduled for 26 October 2019, but postponed due to adverse weather conditions at the City Ground.

28 January 2020 29	Reading	0–1	Bristol City	Reading
20:00 GMT (UTC)	Gunter (yellow card) 45+1'	Report	Diédhiou (yellow card) 33'; Paterson 62'; Smith (yellow card) 66'; Brownhill (yellow card) 74'	Stadium: Madejski Stadium; Attendance: 11,633; Referee: James Linington
Note: Match originally scheduled for 25 January, but rearranged due to Reading's FA Cup fourth-round match against Cardiff City taking place on the 25th.

31 January 2020 30	Cardiff City	1–1	Reading	Cardiff
19:45 GMT (UTC)	J.Richards (yellow card) 56'; Paterson 70'; Nelson (yellow card) 88'; Morrison (yellow card) 90'	Report	Méïté 8'; Baldock (yellow card) 45+1'; Obita (yellow card) 56'	Stadium: Cardiff City Stadium; Attendance: 22,518; Referee: Simon Hooper

8 February 2020 31	Reading	1–1	Hull City	Reading
15:00 GMT (UTC)	Obita 56'; Aluko (yellow card) 85'	Report	Lopes (yellow card) 48'; McLoughlin (yellow card) 71'; Wilks 82'; Irvine (yellow card) 88'	Stadium: Madejski Stadium; Attendance: 13,393; Referee: Andy Davies

12 February 2020 32	Reading	1–2	West Bromwich Albion	Reading
20:00 GMT (UTC)	Pușcaș 11' (pen.); Yiadom (yellow card) 20'; Obita (yellow card) 38'	Report	Bartley (yellow card) 10' (goal) 49'; Pereira 26'; Sawyers (yellow card) 31'	Stadium: Madejski Stadium; Attendance: 13,942; Referee: Matt Donohue

15 February 2020 33	Sheffield Wednesday	0–3	Reading	Sheffield
15:00 GMT (UTC)	Urhoghide (yellow card) 16' (yellow-red card) 49'	Report	Méïté 21'; Ejaria (yellow card) 67'; Pușcaș 72'; Yiadom (yellow card) 81'; Baldock 90+1' (pen.)	Stadium: Hillsborough Stadium; Attendance: 22,199; Referee: Andy Woolmer

22 February 2020 34	Leeds United	1–0	Reading	Leeds
15:00 GMT (UTC)	Ayling (yellow card) 10'; Hernández 57'	Report	Swift (yellow card) 16'; Méïté (yellow card) 36'	Stadium: Elland Road; Attendance: 35,483; Referee: Jarred Gillett

26 February 2020 35	Reading	0–3	Wigan Athletic	Reading
20:00 GMT (UTC)	Yiadom (yellow card) 26'; Pelé (yellow card) 39'; Méïté (yellow card) 78'	Report	Moore 23'; Byrne (yellow card) 62'; Lowe 67'; Jacobs 90+9'	Stadium: Madejski Stadium; Attendance: 10,088; Referee: Geoff Eltringham

29 February 2020 36	Reading	2–0	Barnsley	Reading
15:00 GMT (UTC)	Méïté 17'; Pușcaș 60' (yellow card) 61'	Report	Mowatt (yellow card) 39'; Williams (yellow card) 42'; Sollbauer (yellow card) 54'	Stadium: Madejski Stadium; Attendance: 13,263; Referee: Jeremy Simpson

7 March 2020 37	Birmingham City	1–3	Reading	Birmingham
15:00 GMT (UTC)	Hogan 6'; Bellingham (yellow card) 55'; Colin (yellow card) 72'	Report	Miazga 51'; Méïté 56'; Swift (yellow card) 69'; Pelé 87'	Stadium: St Andrew's; Attendance: 19,525; Referee: Andy Davies

20 June 2020 38	Reading	1–1	Stoke City	Reading
15:00 BST (UTC+1)	João 7'	Report	McClean (yellow card) 62'; Clucas (yellow card) 89'; Powell 90+2'	Stadium: Madejski Stadium; Attendance: 0 Referee: Michael Salisbury
Note: Match originally scheduled for 14 March, but postponed on 13 March due to the COVID-19 pandemic. Match played behind closed doors.

27 June 2020 39	Derby County	2–1	Reading	Derby
13:00 BST (UTC+1)	Lawrence (yellow card) 13' (red card) FT 44'; Rooney 45+3' (pen.); Shinnie (yellow card) 74'; Holmes (yellow card) 90+2'	Report	Rinomhota 62'; Miazga (red card) FT	Stadium: Pride Park; Attendance: 0 Referee: Scott Duncan
Note: Match originally scheduled for 17 March, but postponed on 13 March due to the COVID-19 pandemic. Match played behind closed doors.

30 June 2020 40	Reading	0–3	Brentford	Reading
18:00 BST (UTC+1)		Report	Mbeumo 23'; Dasilva 64'; Jansson (yellow card) 67'; Valencia 90'	Stadium: Madejski Stadium; Attendance: 0 Referee: Dean Whitestone
Note: Match originally scheduled for 21 March, but postponed on 13 March due to the COVID-19 pandemic. Match played behind closed doors.

4 July 2020 41	Luton Town	0–5	Reading	Luton
15:00 BST (UTC+1)		Report	Pelé (yellow card) 15'; Méïté 17', 18', 35', 62'; Pușcaș 57'	Stadium: Kenilworth Road; Attendance: 0 Referee: James Linington
Note: Match originally scheduled for 4 April, but postponed on 19 March due to the COVID-19 pandemic. Match played behind closed doors.

7 July 2020 42	Reading	0–0	Huddersfield Town	Reading
18:00 BST (UTC+1)	Méïté (yellow card) 20'; Pelé (yellow card) 67'	Report	Toffolo (yellow card) 39'; Stanković (yellow card) 50'	Stadium: Madejski Stadium; Attendance: 0 Referee: Steve Martin
Note: Match originally scheduled for 10 April, but postponed on 19 March due to the COVID-19 pandemic.

11 July 2020 43	Charlton Athletic	0–1	Reading	Charlton
12:30 BST (UTC+1)	Doughty (yellow card) 63'; Cullen (yellow card) 69'; Forster-Caskey (yellow card) 85'; Phillips (yellow card) 90'	Report	Pușcaș 3' (pen.); Blackett (yellow card) 45'; Osho (yellow card) 73'; Baldock (yellow card) 77'	Stadium: The Valley; Attendance: 0 Referee: Darren Bond
Note: Match originally scheduled for 13 April, but postponed on 19 March due to the COVID-19 pandemic.

14 July 2020 44	Reading	1–2	Middlesbrough	Reading
18:00 BST (UTC+1)	Pușcaș (yellow card) 19'; Moore 33'; Rinomhota (yellow card) 58'	Report	Fletcher 45'; Roberts 82'	Stadium: Madejski Stadium; Attendance: 0 Referee: Andy Woolmer
Note: Match originally scheduled for 18 April, but postponed on 19 March due to the COVID-19 pandemic.

18 July 2020 45	Blackburn Rovers	4–3	Reading	Blackburn
15:00 BST (UTC+1)	Brereton 3'; Armstrong 6'; Rothwell 56'; Davenport (yellow card) 71'; Gallagher 87'	Report	Swift 15'; Baldock 64'; Méïté 68'	Stadium: Ewood Park; Attendance: 0 Referee: Tim Robinson
Note: Match originally scheduled for 25 April, but postponed on 19 March due to the COVID-19 pandemic.

22 July 2020 46	Reading	1–4	Swansea City	Reading
15:00 BST (UTC+1)	Méïté (red card) 40'; Pușcaș 42' (pen.) (yellow card) 82'	Report	Brewster 17'; Routledge 66', 90+2'; Cullen 85'	Stadium: Madejski Stadium; Attendance: 0 Referee: Steve Martin
Note: Match originally scheduled for 2 May, but postponed on 3 April due to the COVID-19 pandemic.

=== EFL Cup ===
13 August 2019 First Round	Wycombe Wanderers	1–1 (2–4 p)	Reading	High Wycombe
19:45 BST (UTC+1)	Samuel 59'	Report	Pușcaș 63'	Stadium: Adams Park; Attendance: 4,802; Referee: Darren England
	Penalties
	Gape (penalty scored); Freeman (penalty missed); Pattison (penalty scored); Onyedinma (penalty missed)		Pușcaș (penalty scored); Baldock (penalty scored); Swift (penalty scored); Loader (penalty scored)

27 August 2019 Second Round	Plymouth Argyle	2–4	Reading	Plymouth
19:45 BST (UTC+1)	Taylor 23'; Baxter 54'; Cooper (yellow card) 86'	Report	Adam (yellow card) 24'; Barrett 35', 72'; Méïté 87' (pen.), 90+1' (yellow card) 88'	Stadium: Home Park; Attendance: 8,365; Referee: Kevin Johnson

25 September 2019 Third Round	Wolverhampton Wanderers	1–1 (4–2 p)	Reading	Wolverhampton
19:45 BST (UTC+1)	Neto (yellow card) 20'; Jordão 27'; Perry (yellow card) 90+4'	Report	Swift (yellow card) 63'; Boyé 90+9'	Stadium: Molineux Stadium; Attendance: 20,702; Referee: Peter Bankes
	Penalties
	Neves (penalty scored); Vallejo (penalty scored); Bennett (penalty scored); Vinagre (penalty scored)		Pușcaș (penalty scored); Swift (penalty missed); Boyé (penalty missed); Miazga (penalty scored)

=== FA Cup ===
4 January 2020 Third Round	Reading	2–2	Blackpool	Reading
15:01 GMT (UTC)	Baldock 56'; Loader 66'	Report	Delfouneso 28'; Gnanduillet 60', (penalty missed) 68'; Macdonald (yellow card) 65'; Guy (yellow card) 72'; Tilt (yellow card) 90+2'	Stadium: Madejski Stadium; Attendance: 10,181; Referee: John Brooks
Note: All FA Cup third-round ties will be delayed by one minute to help promote mental health.

14 January 2020 Third round replay	Blackpool	0–2	Reading	Blackpool
19:45 GMT (UTC)	Virtue (yellow card) 24'; Spearing (yellow card) 55'; Husband (yellow card) 85'	Report	Boyé 42'; Obita 82'	Stadium: Bloomfield Road; Attendance: 5,213; Referee: Darren Bond

25 January 2020 Fourth round	Reading	1–1	Cardiff City	Reading
15:00 GMT (UTC)	Méïté 8' (yellow card) 9'; McIntyre (yellow card) 45+1' (yellow-red card) 81'; Howe (yellow card) 90+1'	Report	Paterson 5'	Stadium: Madejski Stadium; Attendance: 12,798; Referee: Marc Edwards

4 February 2020 Fourth round replay	Cardiff City	3–3 (a.e.t.) (1–4 p)	Reading	Cardiff
19:45 GMT (UTC)	Murphy 19', 93' (yellow card) 87'; Vaulks (yellow card) 39'; Glatzel 54'; J. Richards (yellow card) 66'; Whyte (yellow card) 75'	Report	O. Richards 69' (yellow card) 87'; Rinomhota 79' (yellow card) 99'; Osho (yellow card) 81'; Méïté 116'	Stadium: Cardiff City Stadium; Attendance: 4,832; Referee: Gavin Ward
	Penalties
	Flint (penalty missed); Vaulks (penalty missed); Pack (penalty scored)		(penalty scored) McCleary; (penalty scored) Osho; (penalty scored) Obita; (penalty scored) Aluko

3 March 2020 Fifth round	Reading	1–2 (a.e.t.)	Sheffield United	Reading
20:00 GMT (UTC)	Pușcaș 43' (pen.); Rinomhota (yellow card) 51'	Report	McGoldrick 2'; Sharp 105+1'; Retsos (yellow card) 120'	Stadium: Madejski Stadium; Attendance: 15,129; Referee: Kevin Friend

== Squad statistics ==
As of match played 22 July 2020

=== Appearances and goals ===
No.	Pos	Nat	Player	Total		Championship		FA Cup		League Cup	
No.	Pos	Nat	Player	Apps	Goals	Apps	Goals	Apps	Goals	Apps	Goals
1	GK	(England) ENG	Sam Walker	5	0	0	0	4	0	1	0
2	DF	(Wales) WAL	Chris Gunter	21	0	18+2	0	1	0	0	0
4	DF	(England) ENG	Michael Morrison	48	2	43+1	2	2	0	1+1	0
5	DF	(United States) USA	Matt Miazga	24	2	19+1	2	3	0	1	0
6	DF	(England) ENG	Liam Moore	44	1	40+3	1	0	0	1	0
8	MF	(England) ENG	Andy Rinomhota	45	2	28+9	1	4+1	1	3	0
9	FW	(England) ENG	Sam Baldock	28	6	12+12	5	1+1	1	0+2	0
10	MF	(England) ENG	John Swift	45	6	40+1	6	2	0	0+2	0
11	DF	(England) ENG	Jordan Obita	26	3	14+7	2	3+1	1	1	0
12	MF	(Jamaica) JAM	Garath McCleary	24	1	2+17	1	3+2	0	0	0
14	MF	(England) ENG	Ovie Ejaria	39	3	36	3	1	0	1+1	0
16	DF	(Scotland) SCO	Tom McIntyre	14	0	9+1	0	2	0	2	0
17	DF	(Ghana) GHA	Andy Yiadom	25	1	24	1	1	0	0	0
18	FW	(Argentina) ARG	Lucas Boyé	24	2	5+14	0	2	1	2+1	1
19	FW	(Ivory Coast) CIV	Yakou Méïté	45	17	32+8	13	3	2	2	2
20	MF	(Brazil) BRA	Felipe Araruna	3	0	2+1	0	0	0	0	0
21	MF	(France) FRA	Michael Olise	23	0	13+6	0	3	0	1	0
23	FW	(Nigeria) NGR	Sone Aluko	6	0	0+2	0	1+3	0	0	0
24	DF	(England) ENG	Tyler Blackett	22	0	16+4	0	1	0	1	0
25	FW	(Kenya) KEN	Ayub Masika	6	0	0+5	0	0+1	0	0	0
26	MF	(Scotland) SCO	Charlie Adam	27	2	8+13	2	2+1	0	3	0
27	DF	(England) ENG	Omar Richards	34	1	23+5	0	4	1	2	0
29	MF	(Guinea-Bissau) GBS	Pelé	34	1	26+5	1	1+1	0	1	0
31	FW	(Portugal) POR	Lucas João	19	6	12+7	6	0	0	0	0
33	GK	(Brazil) BRA	Rafael Cabral	46	0	44	0	1	0	1	0
34	DF	(England) ENG	Gabriel Osho	8	0	4+1	0	1+1	0	1	0
46	DF	(England) ENG	Jeriel Dorsett	1	0	0	0	0+1	0	0	0
47	FW	(Romania) ROU	George Pușcaș	42	14	30+8	12	2	1	1+1	1
Players who appeared for Reading but left during the season:
7	FW	(The Gambia) GAM	Modou Barrow	1	0	1	0	0	0	0	0
15	FW	(Cameroon) CMR	Danny Loader	12	1	1+6	0	2+1	1	1+1	0
20	GK	(Portugal) POR	João Virgínia	3	0	2	0	0	0	1	0
22	DF	(England) ENG	Teddy Howe	5	0	0	0	3	0	2	0
23	FW	(United States) USA	Andrija Novakovich	1	0	0+1	0	0	0	0	0
35	DF	(England) ENG	Akin Odimayo	1	0	0	0	0	0	1	0
36	DF	(England) ENG	Ramarni Medford-Smith	1	0	0	0	0+1	0	0	0
39	MF	(Republic of Ireland) IRL	Josh Barrett	7	2	2+3	0	0	0	2	2
42	DF	(Saint Kitts and Nevis) SKN	Andre Burley	3	0	0	0	2+1	0	0	0
45	FW	(Scotland) SCO	Ben House	1	0	0	0	0+1	0	0	0

=== Goal scorers ===
Place	Position	Nation	Number	Name	Championship	FA Cup	League Cup	Total
1	FW	(Ivory Coast)	19	Yakou Méïté	13	2	2	17
2	FW	(Romania)	47	George Pușcaș	12	1	1	14
3	FW	(Portugal)	31	Lucas João	6	0	0	6
3	MF	(England)	10	John Swift	6	0	0	6
3	FW	(England)	9	Sam Baldock	5	1	0	6
6	MF	(England)	14	Ovie Ejaria	3	0	0	3
6	DF	(England)	11	Jordan Obita	2	1	0	3
8	DF	(England)	4	Michael Morrison	2	0	0	2
8	MF	(Scotland)	26	Charlie Adam	2	0	0	2
8	DF	(United States)	5	Matt Miazga	2	0	0	2
8	MF	(England)	8	Andy Rinomhota	1	1	0	2
8	FW	(Argentina)	18	Lucas Boyé	0	1	1	2
8	MF	(Republic of Ireland)	39	Josh Barrett	0	0	2	2
13	DF	(Ghana)	17	Andy Yiadom	1	0	0	1
13	MF	(Jamaica)	12	Garath McCleary	1	0	0	1
13	MF	(Guinea-Bissau)	29	Pelé	1	0	0	1
13	DF	(England)	6	Liam Moore	1	0	0	1
13	FW	(Cameroon)	15	Danny Loader	0	1	0	1
13	DF	(England)	27	Omar Richards	0	1	0	1
13				Own goal	1	0	0	1
Total					59	9	6	73

=== Clean sheets ===
Place	Position	Nation	Number	Name	Championship	FA Cup	League Cup	Total
1	GK	(Brazil)	33	Rafael Cabral	13	0	0	13
2	GK	(England)	1	Sam Walker	0	1	0	1
TOTALS					13	1	0	14

=== Disciplinary record ===
Number	Nation	Position	Name	Championship		FA Cup		League Cup		Total	
Number	Nation	Position	Name	Booked	Sent off (straight red)	Booked	Sent off (straight red)	Booked	Sent off (straight red)	Booked	Sent off (straight red)
2	(Wales)	DF	Chris Gunter	2	0	0	0	0	0	2	0
4	(England)	DF	Michael Morrison	5	0	0	0	0	0	5	0
5	(United States)	DF	Matt Miazga	2	1	0	0	0	0	2	1
6	(England)	DF	Liam Moore	5	0	0	0	0	0	5	0
8	(England)	MF	Andy Rinomhota	4	0	2	0	0	0	6	0
9	(England)	FW	Sam Baldock	2	0	0	0	0	0	2	0
10	(England)	MF	John Swift	6	1	0	0	1	0	7	1
11	(England)	DF	Jordan Obita	3	0	0	0	0	0	3	0
14	(England)	MF	Ovie Ejaria	3	0	0	0	0	0	3	0
16	(Scotland)	DF	Tom McIntyre	1	0	2	1	0	0	3	1
17	(Ghana)	DF	Andy Yiadom	8	0	0	0	0	0	8	0
18	(Argentina)	FW	Lucas Boyé	3	0	0	0	0	0	3	0
19	(Ivory Coast)	FW	Yakou Méïté	5	1	1	0	1	0	7	1
23	(Nigeria)	FW	Sone Aluko	1	0	0	0	0	0	1	0
24	(England)	DF	Tyler Blackett	2	0	0	0	0	0	2	0
26	(Scotland)	MF	Charlie Adam	4	0	0	0	1	0	5	0
27	(England)	DF	Omar Richards	3	0	1	0	0	0	4	0
29	(Guinea-Bissau)	MF	Pelé	7	0	0	0	0	0	7	0
31	(Portugal)	FW	Lucas João	1	0	0	0	0	0	1	0
33	(Brazil)	GK	Rafael Cabral	1	0	0	0	0	0	1	0
34	(England)	DF	Gabriel Osho	1	0	1	0	0	0	2	0
47	(Romania)	FW	George Pușcaș	5	0	0	0	0	0	5	0
Players away on loan:
Players who left Reading during the season:
22	(England)	DF	Teddy Howe	0	0	1	0	0	0	1	0
Total				74	3	7	1	3	0	84	4

== Awards ==
=== Manager of the Month ===
Month	Name	Award
December	Mark Bowen	Nominated

=== Player of the Month ===
Month	Name	Award
December	Rafael Cabral	Nominated

=== Player of the season ===
Player of the season
#	Nation	Position	Player
1	(Brazil)	GK	Rafael Cabral
