= Pedro Neves =

Pedro Neves may refer to:

- Pedro Luís Neves (born 1955), Portuguese composer
- Pedro Miguel Neves (born 1968), Portuguese basketball player
- Pedro Neves (footballer, born 1981), Portuguese footballer
- Pedro Neves (footballer, born 2001), Portuguese footballer
