= Teddy Howe =

English footballer

Personal information
- Full name: Teddy William Howe
- Date of birth: 9 October 1998 (age 28)
- Place of birth: Oxford, England
- Height: 1.77 m (5 ft 9 1/2 in)
- Position: Defender

Youth career
- 2008–2017: Reading

Senior career*
Years	Team	Apps	(Gls)
2017–2020	Reading	1	(0)
2020–2022	Blackpool	0	(0)
2021	→ Scunthorpe United (loan)	12	(0)
2022	Barnet	18	(0)
2022–2024	Weymouth	52	(1)
2024–2025	Hemel Hempstead Town	20	(1)
2024–2025	→ Bracknell Town (loan)	19	(0)
2026	Bracknell Town	5	(0)
- * Club domestic league appearances and goals as of 12:50, 13 October 2026 (UTC)

Teddy William Howe (born 9 October 1998) is an English professional footballer who plays as a defender. He has previously played for Reading, Blackpool, Scunthorpe United and Barnet. He is the son of the former Reading director Nigel Howe.

== Career ==
=== Reading ===
A product of the academy, Howe signed his first professional contract with Reading in February 2017. On 26 February 2019, Howe extended his contract with the Royals until the summer of 2021. He made his first appearance for Reading against Birmingham City on 5 May 2019.

=== Blackpool ===
Howe signed for Blackpool on 31 January 2020, in a two-and-a-half-year deal, plus an option to extend for a further twelve months. On 1 February 2021, Howe joined League Two side Scunthorpe United on loan for the remainder of the 2020–21 season.

He was released by Blackpool by mutual consent on 18 January 2022.

=== Barnet ===
Howe signed for Barnet on 24 January 2022. He left the Bees at the end of the season after 18 appearances.

=== Weymouth ===
On 23 September 2022, Howe signed for National League South strugglers Weymouth.

=== Hemel Hempstead Town ===
In May 2024, Howe joined Hemel Hempstead Town, reuniting with former Weymouth manager Bobby Wilkinson.

On 27 December 2024, Howe joined Southern League Premier Division South side Bracknell Town on an initial one-month loan deal.

=== Bracknell Town ===
After being without a club in the 2025-26 season, Howe re-joined Bracknell on a permanent basis.

== Career statistics ==
=== Club ===
As of end of 2023–24 season

Appearances and goals by club, season and competition
Club	Season	League			National Cup		League Cup		Other		Total	
Club	Season	Division	Apps	Goals	Apps	Goals	Apps	Goals	Apps	Goals	Apps	Goals
Reading	2018–19	Championship	1	0	0	0	0	0	—		1	0
Reading	2019–20	Championship	0	0	3	0	2	0	—		5	0
Reading	Total		1	0	3	0	2	0	0	0	6	0
Blackpool	2020–21	League One	0	0	0	0	0	0	2 (Note: Appearance in the EFL Trophy)	0	2	0
Scunthorpe United (loan)	2020–21	League Two	12	0	0	0	0	0	0	0	12	0
Barnet	2021–22	National League	18	0	0	0	0	0	0	0	18	0
Weymouth	2022–23	National League South	16	1	3	1	—		0	0	19	2
Weymouth	2023–24	National League South	36	0	2	0	—		2 (Note: Appearance(s) in FA Trophy)	0	40	0
Weymouth	Total		52	1	5	1	0	0	2	0	59	2
Career total			83	1	8	1	2	0	4	0	97	2
