= Andre Burley =

English footballer

Personal information
- Full name: Andre Maurice Keith Burley
- Date of birth: 10 September 1999 (age 27)
- Place of birth: Slough, England
- Height: 1.80 m (5 ft 11 in)
- Position: Centre-back

Team information
- Current team: Farnborough
- Number: 15

Youth career
- –2018: Reading

Senior career*
Years	Team	Apps	(Gls)
2018–2020	Reading	0	(0)
2020	→ Waterford (loan)	3	(0)
2020–2022	Wycombe Wanderers	0	(0)
2020–2021	→ Hungerford Town (loan)	5	(0)
2021–2022	→ Maidenhead United (loan)	3	(0)
2022	→ Hungerford Town (loan)	15	(0)
2022–2025	Oxford City	109	(5)
2025–2026	Dagenham & Redbridge	2	(0)
2026–	Farnborough	2	(0)

International career^{‡}
2021–	Saint Kitts and Nevis	28	(2)
- * Club domestic league appearances and goals as of 21:51, 22 October 2026 (UTC) ‡ National team caps and goals as of 23:36, 6 June 2025 (UTC)

Andre Maurice Keith Burley (born 10 September 1999) is a professional footballer who plays as a defender for National League South club Farnborough. Born in England, he represents Saint Kitts and Nevis internationally.

== Club career ==
A youth product of Reading, Burley signed his first professional contract with the club on 2 July 2018. He made his professional debut with Reading in a 2–2 FA Cup tie with Blackpool on 4 January 2020. He signed on loan with the Irish club Waterford on 14 February 2020 for the remainder of the 2019–20 season. On 29 September 2020, Burley signed with Wycombe Wanderers. He moved to Hungerford Town on loan on 14 December 2020. On 5 November 2021, it was announced that he had joined Maidenhead United on loan for the remainder of the season. His loan spell ended early and he returned to Wycombe on 17 January 2022, before re-joining Hungerford on loan later that month.

On 29 June 2022, he dropped into non-league football permanently to sign for National League South side Oxford City. He impressed in his first season with the club making 42 appearances as the club were promoted to the National League having beaten Worthing in the play-off final. Following promotion, Burley signed a new one-year contract. Oxford City struggled with the step-up in division for the 2023–24 season and ended up being relegated straight back down after finishing bottom of the league, however, Burley committed to a third year at Marsh Lane under new manager Sam Cox. Oxford City struggled again in the league during the 2024–25 season in National League North, having to travel long distances, but did make it through to the quarter finals in the FA Trophy. Burley departed the club in August 2025, having made well over 100 appearances.

On 2 August 2025, Burley signed for newly-relegated National League South side Dagenham & Redbridge on a one-year contract. Unfortunately he was injured in just his second game for Dagenham against Salisbury on 16 August, suffering an ACL tear which kept him on the sidelines for a sustained period.

On 10 October 2026, Burley joined National League South club Farnborough.

== International career ==
Burley was called up to represent the Saint Kitts and Nevis U20s for the 2018 CONCACAF U-20 Championship. He made his debut for Saint Kitts and Nevis national football team on 24 March 2021 in a World Cup qualifier against Puerto Rico.

== Career statistics ==
=== Club ===
As of match played 17 October 2026

Appearances and goals by club, season and competition
Club	Season	League			National Cup (Note: Includes FA Cup)		League Cup (Note: Includes EFL Cup)		Other		Total	
Club	Season	Division	Apps	Goals	Apps	Goals	Apps	Goals	Apps	Goals	Apps	Goals
Reading U21	2017–18	—							2 (Note: Appearance(s) in EFL Trophy)	0	2	0
Reading	2019–20	Championship	0	0	3	0	0	0	—		3	0
Waterford (loan)	2020	LOI Premier Division	3	0	—		—		—		3	0
Wycombe Wanderers	2020–21	Championship	0	0	0	0	0	0	0	0	0	0
Wycombe Wanderers	2021–22	League One	0	0	—		2	0	2	0	4	0
Wycombe Wanderers	Total		0	0	0	0	2	0	2	0	4	0
Hungerford Town (loan)	2020–21	National League South	5	0	—		—		1 (Note: Appearance(s) in FA Trophy)	0	6	0
Maidenhead United (loan)	2021–22	National League	3	0	1	0	—		—		4	0
Hungerford Town (loan)	2021–22	National League South	15	0	—		—		—		15	0
Oxford City	2022–23	National League South	39	1	3	0	—		2 (Note: Appearance(s) in National League South play-offs)	0	44	1
Oxford City	2023–24	National League	36	2	1	0	—		0	0	37	2
Oxford City	2024–25	National League North	34	2	1	0	—		4	1	39	3
Oxford City	Total		109	5	5	0	—		6	1	120	6
Dagenham & Redbridge	2025–26	National League South	2	0	0	0	—		0	0	2	0
Farnborough	2026–27	National League South	2	0	—		—		0	0	2	0
Career total			139	5	9	0	2	0	11	1	161	6

=== International ===
As of match played 6 June 2025

Appearances and goals by national team and year
National team	Year	Apps	Goals
Saint Kitts and Nevis	2021	5	0
Saint Kitts and Nevis	2022	2	0
Saint Kitts and Nevis	2023	13	0
Saint Kitts and Nevis	2024	7	2
Saint Kitts and Nevis	2025	1	0
Total		28	2

=== International goals ===
#	Date	Venue	Opponent	Score	Result	Competition
1.	20 March 2024	San Marino Stadium, Serravalle, San Marino	San Marino	2–1	3–1	Friendly
2.	14 November 2024	SKNFA Technical Center, Basseterre, Saint Kitts and Nevis	Cuba	2–1	2–1	2025 CONCACAF Gold Cup qualification play-in
