= Rafael Cabral =

Brazilian footballer (born 1990)

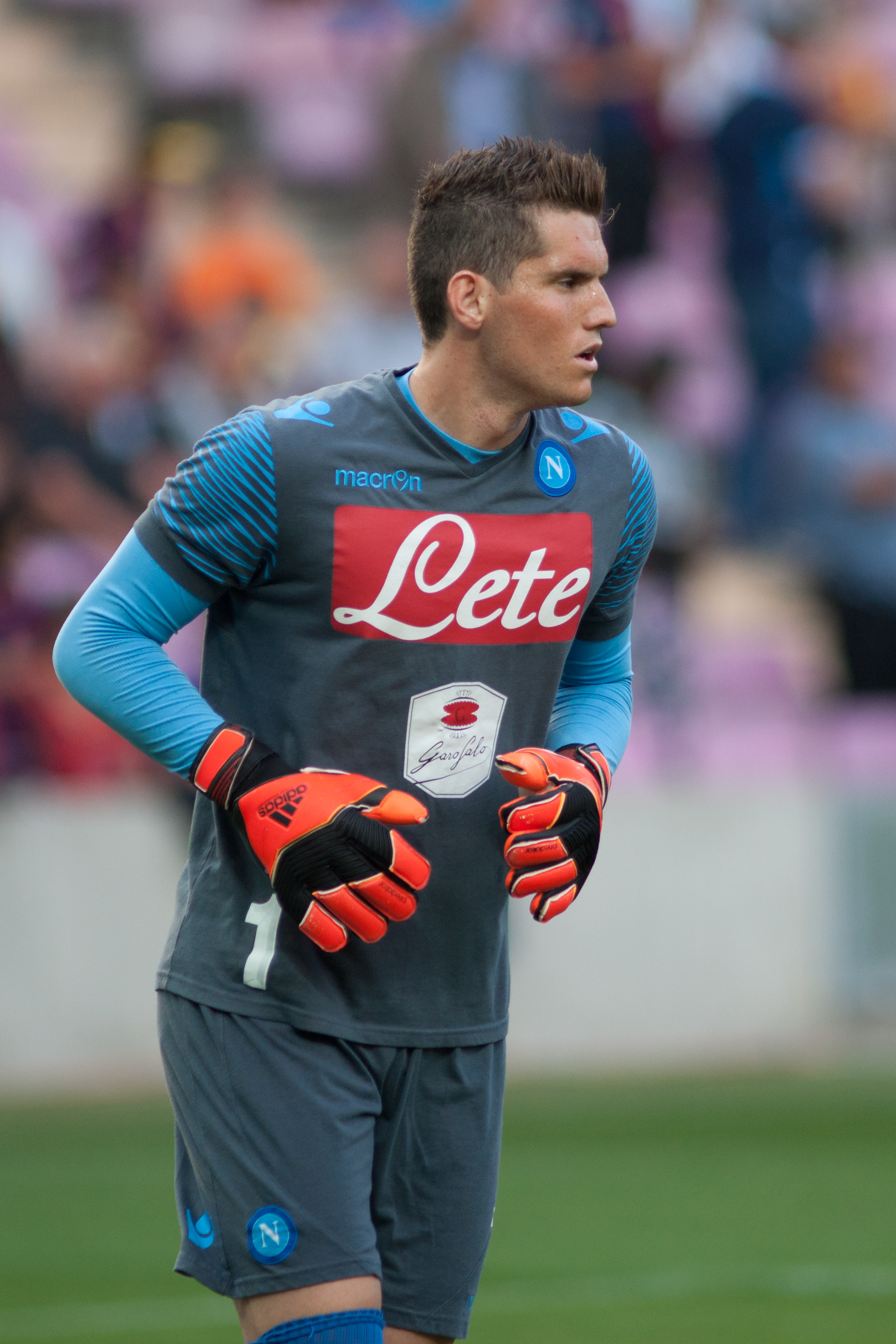
- Rafael playing for Napoli in 2014

Personal information
- Full name: Rafael Cabral Barbosa
- Date of birth: 20 May 1990 (age 36)
- Place of birth: Sorocaba, Brazil
- Height: 1.86 m (6 ft 1 in)
- Position: Goalkeeper

Team information
- Current team: Real Salt Lake
- Number: 1

Youth career
- 2006–2010: Santos

Senior career*
Years	Team	Apps	(Gls)
2010–2013	Santos	151	(0)
2013–2018	Napoli	32	(0)
2018–2019	Sampdoria	2	(0)
2019–2022	Reading	95	(0)
2022–2024	Cruzeiro	107	(0)
2024	→ Grêmio (loan)	6	(0)
2025–	Real Salt Lake	34	(0)

International career^{‡}
2012	Brazil Olympic	1	(0)
2012	Brazil	3	(0)
- * Club domestic league appearances and goals as of 25 November 2025 ‡ National team caps and goals as of 9 June 2012

Rafael Cabral Barbosa (born 20 May 1990), known as Rafael Cabral or simply Rafael, is a Brazilian professional footballer who plays as a goalkeeper for Real Salt Lake.

== Club career ==
=== Santos ===
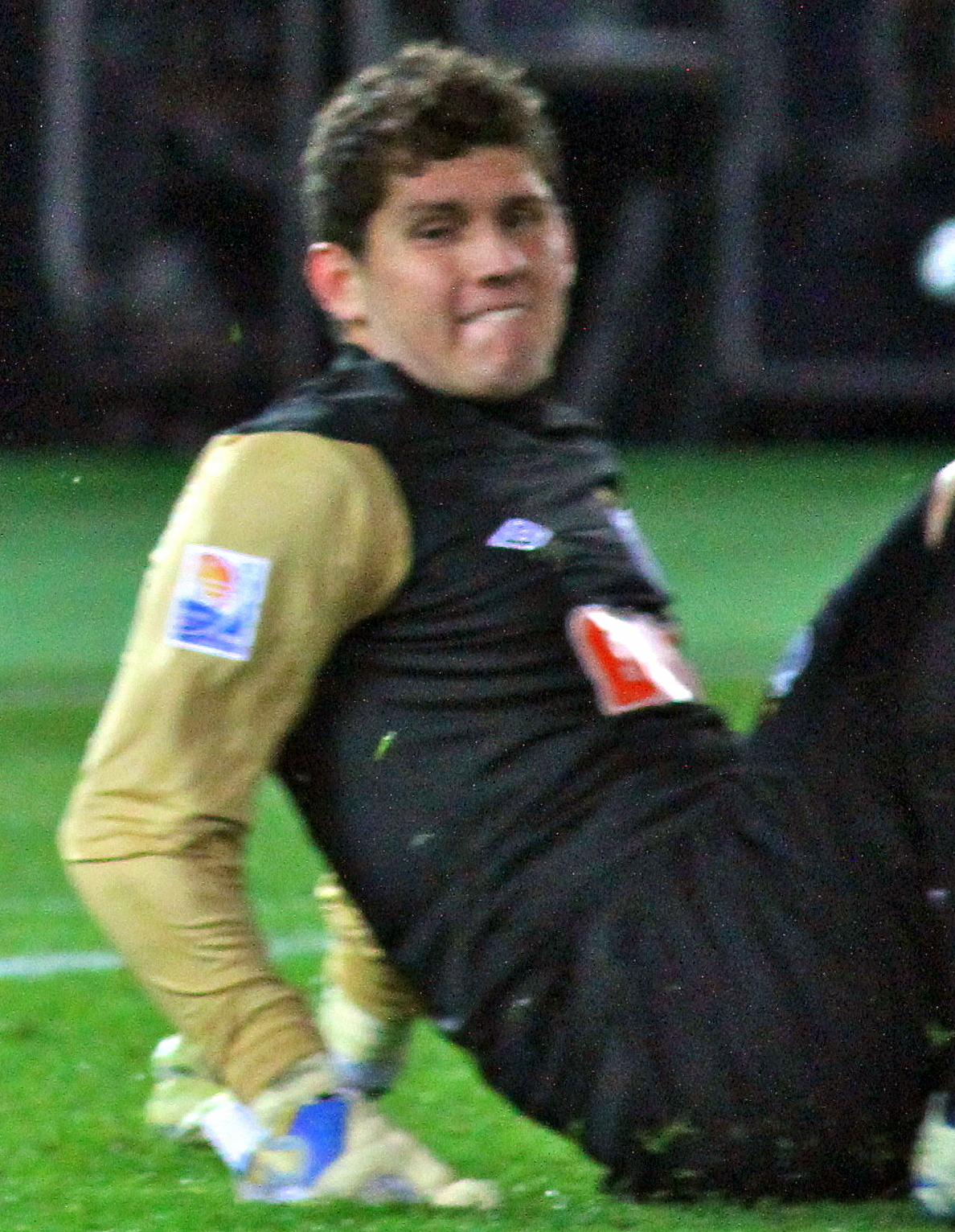
Rafael playing for Santos in the 2011 FIFA Club World Cup final

Born in Sorocaba, Rafael joined Santos youth system in 2006. In 2010, he was promoted to the first team, but broke his right leg in a split with the centre back Domingos and sidelined for four months.

Rafael played in the second half of the match between Santos and the New York Red Bulls in the United States. It was won by Red Bull by 3–1 but Rafael did not concede a goal, the three goals from New York were scored in the first half, when the goalkeeper was Fábio Costa.

His debut in the first team for Santos in an official game took place on 2 June 2010, the match between Santos and Cruzeiro in Mineirão, where the score was 0–0. He took the place of Felipe, who had played all previous 37 matches that season.

On 20 August 2012, Rafael Cabral's right eye started bleeding when he collided with Juan Manuel Martínez in a 2012 Campeonato Brasileiro Série A fixture between Santos and Corinthians. He then recovered and was able to continue the game. Santos won the game 3–2.

=== Napoli ===
On 28 June 2013, Rafael was sold from Santos to Italian side Napoli. The Azzurri paid €5 million for the Brazilian goalkeeper. Rafael made his UEFA Champions League debut against Arsenal in a group stage match in Naples. Napoli won the match 2–0 and Rafael was able to keep a clean sheet against the English side. Nevertheless, Napoli was unable to advance out of the group stages.

He was manager Rafael Benítez's first-choice goalkeeper for the 2014–15 season following the departure of the loaned-in Pepe Reina. On 22 December, in the 2014 Supercoppa Italiana in Doha, he gave Napoli victory over Juventus by saving from Simone Padoin in sudden death at the end of a penalty shootout.

=== Sampdoria ===
On 22 July 2018, Rafael Cabral signed with U.C. Sampdoria on a free transfer. On 5 August 2019, Sampdoria announced that Rafael Cabral’s contract with the club had been terminated by mutual agreement.

=== Reading ===
On 6 August 2019, Reading announced the signing of Rafael on a three-year contract. Rafael made his debut against Wycombe Wanderers in the EFL Cup and saved two penalties in the penalty shootout win. Rafael made his Sky Bet Championship debut against Cardiff City and gained his first clean sheet for the club in a 3–0 victory. He then went on to claim the No. 1 spot, beating out Everton loanee João Virginia and Sam Walker. Rafael’s heroics during consecutive games in the month of December earned him a spot on WhoScored.com Team of the Month for December 2019.

On 22 July 2020, ahead of the final game of the 2019–20 season, Rafael was announced as the clubs player of the season.

On 17 January 2022, Rafael left Reading after his contract was terminated by mutual consent.

=== Cruzeiro ===
On 19 January 2022, Rafael returned to Brazil after 9 years in Europe, signing for Série B club Cruzeiro on a two-year contract.

=== Real Salt Lake ===
On 21 January 2025, Rafael signed with MLS side Real Salt Lake.

== International career ==
Rafael made his debut for Brazil against the United States on 30 May 2012, in a 4–1 win.

He was called up to the Brazil national under-23 football team at the London 2012 Summer Olympics but was later replaced due to injury.

== Career statistics ==
=== Club ===
As of match played 13 April 2025

Appearances and goals by club, season and competition
Club	Season	League			State league (Note: Includes Campeonato Paulista, Campeonato Mineiro)		National cup		League cup (Note: Includes EFL Cup)		Continental		Other		Total	
Club	Season	Division	Apps	Goals	Apps	Goals	Apps	Goals	Apps	Goals	Apps	Goals	Apps	Goals	Apps	Goals
Santos	2010	Série A	32	0	0	0	2	0	—		2 (Note: Appearances in the Copa Sudamericana)	0	—		36	0
Santos	2011	Série A	32	0	20	0	—		—		14 (Note: Appearances in the Copa Libertadores)	0	2 (Note: Appearance(s) in the FIFA Club World Cup)	0	68	0
Santos	2012	Série A	25	0	14	0	—		—		12	0	2 (Note: Appearance(s) in the Recopa Sudamericana)	0	53	0
Santos	2013	Série A	5	0	23	0	4	0	—		—		—		32	0
Santos	Total		94	0	57	0	6	0	—		28	0	4	0	189	0
Napoli	2013–14	Serie A	8	0	—		1	0	—		2 (Note: One appearance in the UEFA Champions League and one appearance in the UEFA Europa League)	0	—		11	0
Napoli	2014–15	Serie A	23	0	—		0	0	—		8 (Note: Two appearance in the UEFA Champions League and six appearance in the UEFA Europa League)	0	1 (Note: Appearance in the Supercoppa Italiana)	0	32	0
Napoli	2015–16	Serie A	0	0	—		0	0	—		0	0	—		0	0
Napoli	2016–17	Serie A	1	0	—		1	0	—		0	0	—		2	0
Napoli	2017–18	Serie A	0	0	—		0	0	—		0	0	—		0	0
Napoli	Total		32	0	—		2	0	—		10	0	1	0	45	0
Sampdoria	2018–19	Serie A	2	0	—		2	0	—		—		—		4	0
Reading	2019–20	EFL Championship	44	0	—		1	0	1	0	—		—		46	0
Reading	2020–21	EFL Championship	45	0	—		0	0	0	0	—		—		45	0
Reading	2021–22	EFL Championship	6	0	—		1	0	0	0	—		—		7	0
Reading	Total		95	0	—		2	0	1	0	—		—		98	0
Cruzeiro	2022	Série B	37	0	11	0	6	0	—		—		—		54	0
Cruzeiro	2023	Série A	37	0	10	0	4	0	—		—		—		51	0
Cruzeiro	2024	Série A	0	0	12	0	1	0	—		2	0	—		15	0
Cruzeiro	Total		74	0	33	0	11	0	—		2	0	—		120	0
Grêmio (loan)	2024	Série A	6	0	0	0	0	0	—		0	0	—		6	0
Real Salt Lake	2025	Major League Soccer	8	0	—		0	0	—		2 (Note: Appearances in the CONCACAF Champions Cup)	0	—		10	0
Career total			311	0	90	0	23	0	1	0	42	0	5	0	472	0

== Honours ==
Santos

- São Paulo State League: 2010, 2011, 2012
- Copa do Brasil: 2010
- Copa Libertadores: 2011
- Recopa Sudamericana: 2012

Napoli

- Coppa Italia: 2013–14
- Supercoppa Italiana: 2014

Cruzeiro

- Campeonato Brasileiro Série B: 2022

Individual

- Reading Player of the Season: 2019–20
