= Ovie Ejaria =

English footballer (born 1997)

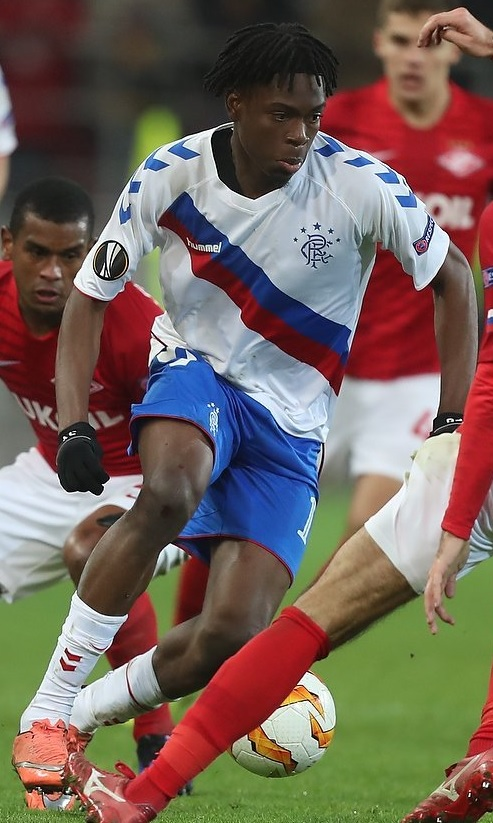
- Ejaria playing for Rangers in 2018

Personal information
- Full name: Oviemuno Dominic Ejaria
- Date of birth: 18 November 1997 (age 28)
- Place of birth: Southwark, England
- Height: 6 ft 0 in (1.83 m)
- Position: Midfielder

Youth career
- 2005–2014: Arsenal
- 2014–2016: Liverpool

Senior career*
Years	Team	Apps	(Gls)
2016–2020	Liverpool	2	(0)
2018	→ Sunderland (loan)	11	(1)
2018	→ Rangers (loan)	14	(1)
2019–2020	→ Reading (loan)	52	(4)
2020–2023	Reading	72	(5)
2025–2026	Oviedo	8	(0)

International career
2016–2017	England U20	7	(2)
2018	England U21	1	(0)
- * Club domestic league appearances and goals as of 13:32, 28 April 2026 (UTC)

Oviemuno Dominic Ejaria (born 18 November 1997) is an English professional footballer who plays as a midfielder. He is a former England under-21 international.

== Club career ==
=== Liverpool ===
Living in Southwark, Greater London, he grew up supporting Arsenal for whom he played for nine years before signing for Liverpool in 2014. His first competitive call-up came on 16 September 2016 in a Premier League match against Chelsea. He was an unused substitute in Liverpool's 2–1 victory. Four days later, he made his first-team debut against Derby County in the EFL Cup, replacing Roberto Firmino in a 3–0 victory.

On 25 October, Ejaria made his full debut in the fourth round of the EFL Cup in a 2–1 win over against Tottenham at Anfield. On 6 November 2016, he debuted in the Premier League, coming on as a substitute in Liverpool's 6–1 home win over Watford.

==== Loan to Sunderland ====
On 31 January 2018, Ejaria made a deadline day switch to Sunderland, signing on loan for the remainder of the season. He made 11 appearances in total as the club were relegated to League One. His only goal, and his first in senior football, came in the final match of the regular season when he opened the scoring in a 3–0 win over the eventual league champions, Wolverhampton Wanderers.

==== Loan to Rangers ====
In June 2018, Ejaria moved on loan to Scottish Premiership club Rangers for the 2018–19 season, managed by former Liverpool captain and academy coach Steven Gerrard, after signing a new long-term contract with Liverpool. He made his debut on 12 July, coming on as a second-half substitute in Rangers' 2–0 UEFA Europa League win over Macedonian team Shkupi. He scored his first goal for the club in a Scottish Premiership match against Motherwell on 26 August. Four days later on 30 August he scored against Russian Premier League team FC Ufa in the away leg of the Europa League Play-off Round, the 1–1 result sent Rangers into the Group stage 2–1 on aggregate. In December 2018 his loan was curtailed earlier than planned and he returned to training with Liverpool.

=== Reading ===
On 7 January 2019, Ejaria joined Championship club Reading on loan until the end of the 2018–19 season. He rejoined Reading on 8 August on loan for the 2019–20 season, with Reading having an obligation to sign Ejaria permanently at the end of the season. On 2 July, Reading confirmed that Ejaria's loan deal from Liverpool had been extended until the end of July to account for prolonged 2019–20 season.

On 28 August 2020, Ejaria signed a permanent four-year contract with Reading which would earn him an annual salary of £650,000. On 18 December 2023, Ejaria left the club by mutual consent. Following his release by Reading, Ejaria was reported to have gone on trial with EFL Championship club Plymouth Argyle. In October 2024, Ejaria went on trial with Egyptian Premier League club Zamalek, managed by his former Reading Manager José Gomes.

=== Oviedo ===
In July 2025, Ejaria went on trial with newly promoted La Liga side Real Oviedo, managed by another of Ejaria's previous Reading managers, Veljko Paunović. On 13 August, he signed a permanent two-year contract with the club.

== International career ==
Ejaria is eligible to represent England or Nigeria internationally. He trained with the Nigeria under-17 team in 2013 and stated that his international allegiance lay with the country in 2014. However, despite rumours of a senior Nigeria call up being in the offing, Ejaria accepted a call up to the England U20 team on 30 September 2016. He made his debut for the Under-20 team on 7 October, in a 3–1 win against Germany, playing the whole match.

Ejaria was selected for the England under-20 team in the 2017 FIFA U-20 World Cup. He made his first start in a game in the first round match against South Korea, and came on as a substitute the quarter-final against Mexico, but was an unused substitute in the final where England beat Venezuela 1–0.

He was called up for the England under-21 team in March 2018, making his debut in a friendly against Romania. He was called up again in May 2018 for the Toulon Tournament but had to withdraw from the squad due to an injury.

In December 2019, Nigeria national team coach Gernot Rohr urged the Nigeria Football Federation to get Ejaria to switch allegiance to Nigeria.

== Personal life ==
Ejaria was born and raised in England to Nigerian parents. He is an Arsenal fan.

== Career statistics ==
As of match played 23 April 2026

Appearances and goals by club, season and competition
Club	Season	League			National Cup (Note: Includes FA Cup)		League Cup (Note: Includes EFL Cup, Scottish League Cup)		Europe		Total	
Club	Season	Division	Apps	Goals	Apps	Goals	Apps	Goals	Apps	Goals	Apps	Goals
Liverpool	2016–17	Premier League	2	0	3	0	3	0	—		8	0
Liverpool	2017–18	Premier League	0	0	0	0	0	0	0	0	0	0
Liverpool	Total		2	0	3	0	3	0	0	0	8	0
Sunderland (loan)	2017–18	Championship	11	1	—		—		—		11	1
Rangers (loan)	2018–19	Scottish Premiership	14	1	0	0	3	0	11 (Note: Appearances UEFA Europa League)	1	28	2
Reading (loan)	2018–19	Championship	16	1	—		—		—		16	1
Reading (loan)	2019–20	Championship	36	3	1	0	2	0	—		39	3
Reading (loan)	Total		52	4	1	0	2	0	0	0	55	4
Reading	2020–21	Championship	38	3	0	0	0	0	—		38	3
Reading	2021–22	Championship	26	2	0	0	0	0	—		26	2
Reading	2022–23	Championship	8	0	0	0	0	0	—		8	0
Reading	2023–24	League One	0	0	0	0	0	0	—		0	0
Reading	Total		72	5	0	0	0	0	—		72	5
Oviedo	2025–26	La Liga	8	0	0	0	—		—		8	0
Career total			159	11	4	0	8	0	11	1	182	12

== Honours ==
England U20

- FIFA U-20 World Cup: 2017
