= Tyler Blackett =

English footballer (born 1994)

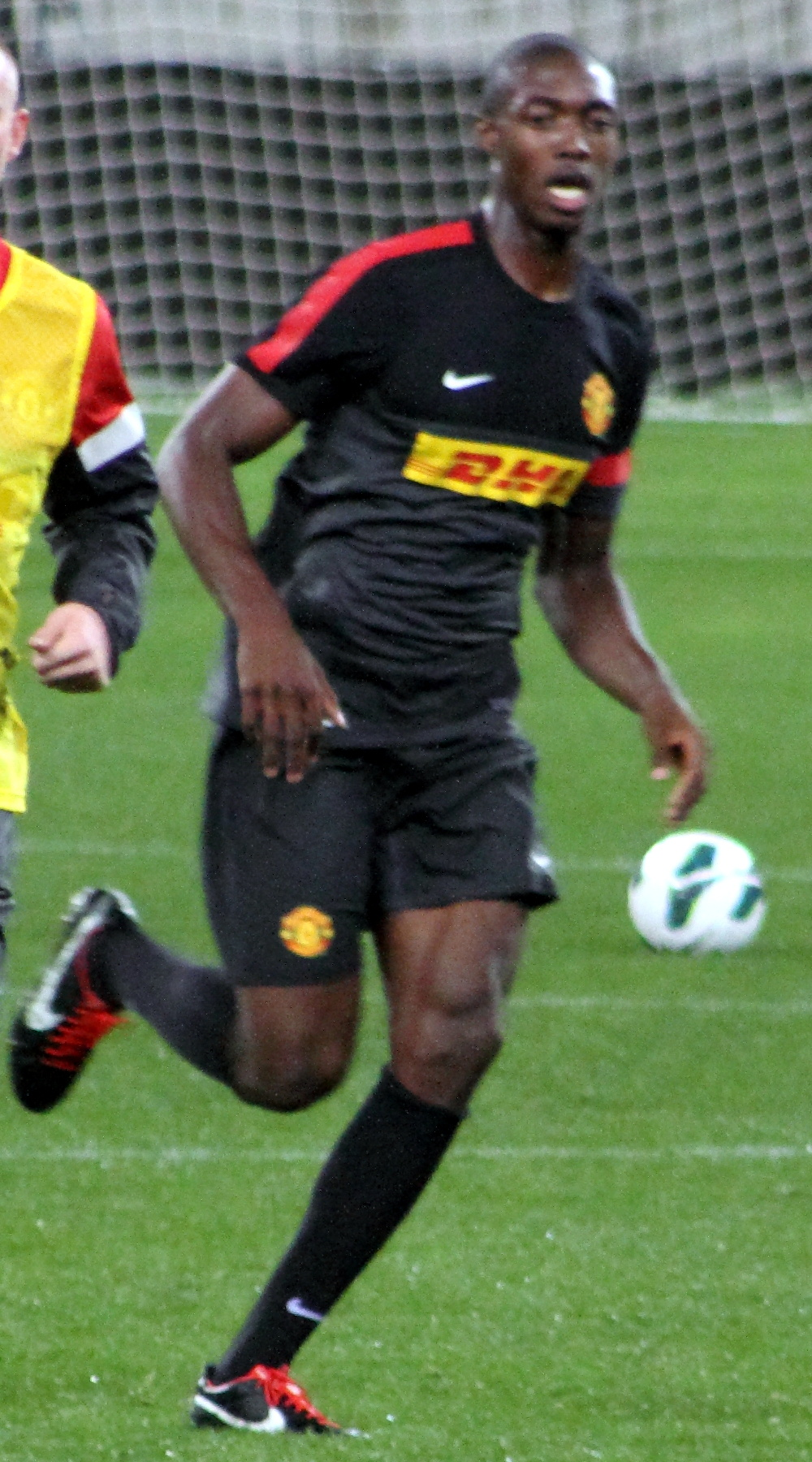
- Blackett in training with Manchester United in late 2012

Personal information
- Full name: Tyler Nathan Blackett
- Date of birth: 2 April 1994 (age 32)
- Place of birth: Manchester, England
- Height: 6 ft 2 in (1.88 m)
- Position: Defender

Team information
- Current team: New Mexico United
- Number: 24

Youth career
- Fletcher Moss Rangers
- 2002–2012: Manchester United

Senior career*
Years	Team	Apps	(Gls)
2012–2016	Manchester United	11	(0)
2013–2014	→ Blackpool (loan)	5	(0)
2014	→ Birmingham City (loan)	8	(0)
2015–2016	→ Celtic (loan)	3	(0)
2016–2020	Reading	110	(0)
2020–2021	Nottingham Forest	14	(0)
2021–2022	FC Cincinnati	31	(1)
2023–2024	Rotherham United	16	(1)
2026–	New Mexico United	17	(0)

International career
2009	England U16	2	(0)
2011	England U17	2	(0)
2011–2012	England U18	2	(0)
2012–2013	England U19	2	(0)
2014	England U21	1	(0)
- * Club domestic league appearances and goals as of 10:17, 10 November 2026 (UTC)

Tyler Nathan Blackett (born 2 April 1994) is an English professional footballer who plays as a left-back or centre-back for USL Championship side New Mexico United. He joined Manchester United's youth academy in 2002 and worked his way through to the first-team, as well as spending time on loan to Blackpool, Birmingham City and Celtic. He then played for Reading and Nottingham Forest and in Major League Soccer for FC Cincinnati before returning to English football with Rotherham United. He has played for England from under-16 to under-21 levels.

== Club career ==
=== Manchester United ===
Blackett began his football career with youth club Fletcher Moss Rangers, and signed for Manchester United in 2002 at the age of 8. He signed a professional contract with United in July 2012.

==== Blackpool (loan) ====
On 1 November 2013, Blackett signed for Championship club Blackpool on a month-long loan. The next day, he made his debut for the Seasiders, playing the whole 90 minutes in a 1–0 league win at Nottingham Forest. On 5 December 2013, Blackpool extended Blackett's loan until 1 January 2014.

==== Birmingham City (loan) ====
On 31 January 2014, Blackett signed for Championship club Birmingham City on a youth loan until the end of the season. Together with fellow Manchester United loanee Tom Thorpe, Blackett started the next day's match, at home to Derby County. After 38 minutes, he tripped Will Hughes to concede a penalty, which Darren Randolph saved. Birmingham came back from 3–1 down to draw, the equaliser scored by a third United loanee, Federico Macheda, in stoppage time.

=== 2014–15 season: Return to United ===
During the 2014–15 pre-season, Blackett played at centre-back for Manchester United in a 3–5–2 formation and his performances led to him earning praise from new manager Louis van Gaal. In the club's final pre-season match against Valencia at Old Trafford, he provided the assist for Marouane Fellaini's stoppage-time winner to make the score 2–1.

As a result of an injury crisis and the departure of experienced defenders Rio Ferdinand and Nemanja Vidić from the club, Blackett was drafted into the first team squad on a permanent basis. Blackett made his competitive debut for Manchester United on 16 August 2014, in the first match of the 2014–15 Premier League season, playing the full 90 minutes and being booked in a 2–1 home defeat to Swansea City in Van Gaal's first competitive match as Manchester United manager. He also played in the next game away at Sunderland, which ended in a 1–1 draw with Blackett making an important clearance during the match to help earn Manchester United a point. Blackett also played in the 0–0 draw against Burnley on 30 August 2014. During the game he received a yellow card for a mistimed challenge. Blackett then played in United's first win of the season when they beat Queens Park Rangers 4–0 as a centre-back rather than a full-back. He was sent off in the 82nd minute on 21 September as United lost 5–3 at Leicester City.

On 17 May 2015 in a home match against Arsenal, Blackett came on in place of Marcos Rojo after 73 minutes, and nine minutes later deflected a Theo Walcott cross for an own goal past United goalkeeper Victor Valdés to cause a 1–1 draw. In total, Blackett made 12 Premier League appearances during the 2014–15 season.

==== Celtic (loan) ====
On 29 August 2015, Blackett was loaned to Scottish Premiership club Celtic until the end of the 2015–16 season. He made his debut playing at left-back in a league match at Aberdeen on 12 September 2015, but Celtic lost 2–1 to the league leaders. Blackett dropped out of the side for a few matches, but returned on 4 October for a league match at Hamilton Accies, taking the place of the suspended Efe Ambrose in central defence and helped Celtic to a 2–1 win.

=== Reading ===
On 22 August 2016, Blackett signed a four-year contract with Championship club Reading. Head coach Jaap Stam, a former Manchester United player, praised the defender for his versatility and attacking presence.

With his contract with Reading due to expire on 30 June 2020, and due to the effects of the COVID-19 pandemic on the 2019–20 season, Blackett signed a short-term extension with Reading until the end of the season. Following the completion of the 2019–20 season, Reading announced that Blackett would leave the club at the end of July 2020.

=== Nottingham Forest ===
On 15 August 2020, Blackett joined Nottingham Forest on a permanent contract. He made his debut for the club on 12 September, starting in a 2–0 defeat away to Queens Park Rangers.

=== FC Cincinnati ===
On 6 August 2021, Blackett joined Major League Soccer club FC Cincinnati on a free transfer. Blackett was released by Cincinnati following their 2022 season.

=== Rotherham United ===
On 8 March 2023, Blackett returned to England when he joined Championship club Rotherham United on a short-term contract until the end of the season. On 7 May 2024, after the club were relegated, Rotherham announced the player would be released in the summer after his contract expired.

=== New Mexico United ===
On 2 March 2026, New Mexico United announced they had signed Blackett to a contract for the remainder of the 2026 USL Championship season.

== International career ==
=== Background ===
Blackett qualifies to play for England, Barbados or Jamaica internationally and has represented England at various youth levels.

=== England Under-16s ===
In September 2009, Blackett was called up to the England U16 squad for the 2009 Victory Shield match against Wales. On 15 October, he started the 1–0 win against Wales, but was replaced by Alex Henshall a few minutes before half-time. Blackett was recalled to the squad for the final Victory Shield match against Scotland in November 2009; he replaced Sam Magri in the 69th minute as England won 2–1 at the Tynecastle Stadium in Edinburgh. The victory sealed England's ninth consecutive Victory Shield.

=== England Under-17s ===
Blackett was called up to the England U17 squad for the Algarve Tournament in February 2011. He started England's opening game of the tournament on 24 February, playing the full 90 minutes in a 1–1 draw with Romania. He was an unused substitute in the 3–1 defeat against Germany, but came on to replace Alex Henshall in the 76th minute of the 2–2 draw with Portugal.

=== England Under-18s ===
In November 2011, Blackett was called up to the England U18 squad for a friendly against Slovakia. On 16 November, he started the 1–1 draw with Slovakia, before being replaced by Courtney Meppen-Walter in the 65th minute. He retained his place in the squad for the friendly against Poland in February 2012, coming on at half-time as England won 3–0 at the Alexandra Stadium.

=== England Under-19s ===
In August 2012, Blackett was called up to the England U19 squad for a friendly against Germany. On 6 September, he started the game in Hamburg, playing the whole 90 minutes as England lost 3–1. Blackett earned his second call up for a friendly with Denmark in January 2013, he started the game before being replaced by Lewis Baker in the 67th minute as England won 3–1 at the Keepmoat Stadium.

=== England Under-21s ===
In August 2014 Blackett received his first call up to the England U21 squad after becoming part of the Manchester United first team squad and starting the first two games of the season.

== Career statistics ==
=== Club ===
As of end of 2023–24 season

Appearances and goals by club, season and competition
Club	Season	League			National cup (Note: Includes FA Cup, Scottish Cup, U.S. Open Cup)		League cup (Note: Includes Football League Cup / EFL Cup, Scottish League Cup)		Europe		Other		Total	
Club	Season	Division	Apps	Goals	Apps	Goals	Apps	Goals	Apps	Goals	Apps	Goals	Apps	Goals
Manchester United	2012–13	Premier League	0	0	0	0	0	0	0	0	—		0	0
Manchester United	2013–14	Premier League	0	0	0	0	0	0	0	0	0	0	0	0
Manchester United	2014–15	Premier League	11	0	1	0	0	0	—		—		12	0
Manchester United	2015–16	Premier League	0	0	0	0	—		0	0	—		0	0
Manchester United	Total		11	0	1	0	0	0	0	0	0	0	12	0
Blackpool (loan)	2013–14	Championship	5	0	—		—		—		—		5	0
Birmingham City (loan)	2013–14	Championship	8	0	—		—		—		—		8	0
Celtic (loan)	2015–16	Scottish Premiership	3	0	1	0	1	0	3 (Note: Appearances in UEFA Europa League)	0	—		8	0
Reading	2016–17	Championship	34	0	1	0	2	0	—		3 (Note: Appearances in Championship play-offs)	0	40	0
Reading	2017–18	Championship	25	0	1	0	2	0	—		—		28	0
Reading	2018–19	Championship	31	0	0	0	1	0	—		—		32	0
Reading	2019–20	Championship	20	0	1	0	1	0	—		—		22	0
Reading	Total		110	0	3	0	6	0	—		3	0	122	0
Reading U23	2016–17	—			—		—		—		1 (Note: Appearance in EFL Trophy)	0	1	0
Nottingham Forest	2020–21	Championship	14	0	1	0	1	0	—		—		16	0
FC Cincinnati	2021	MLS	11	1	0	0	—		—		—		11	1
FC Cincinnati	2022	MLS	20	0	1	0	—		—		—		21	0
FC Cincinnati	Total		31	1	1	0	—		—		—		32	1
Rotherham United	2022–23	Championship	6	0	—		—		—		—		6	0
Rotherham United	2023–24	Championship	10	1	0	0	2	0	—		—		12	1
Rotherham United	Total		16	1	0	0	2	0	—		—		18	1
Career total			198	2	7	0	10	0	3	0	4	0	222	2

== Honours ==
Celtic

- Scottish Premiership: 2015–16
