= Myles Roberts =

English footballer (born 2001)

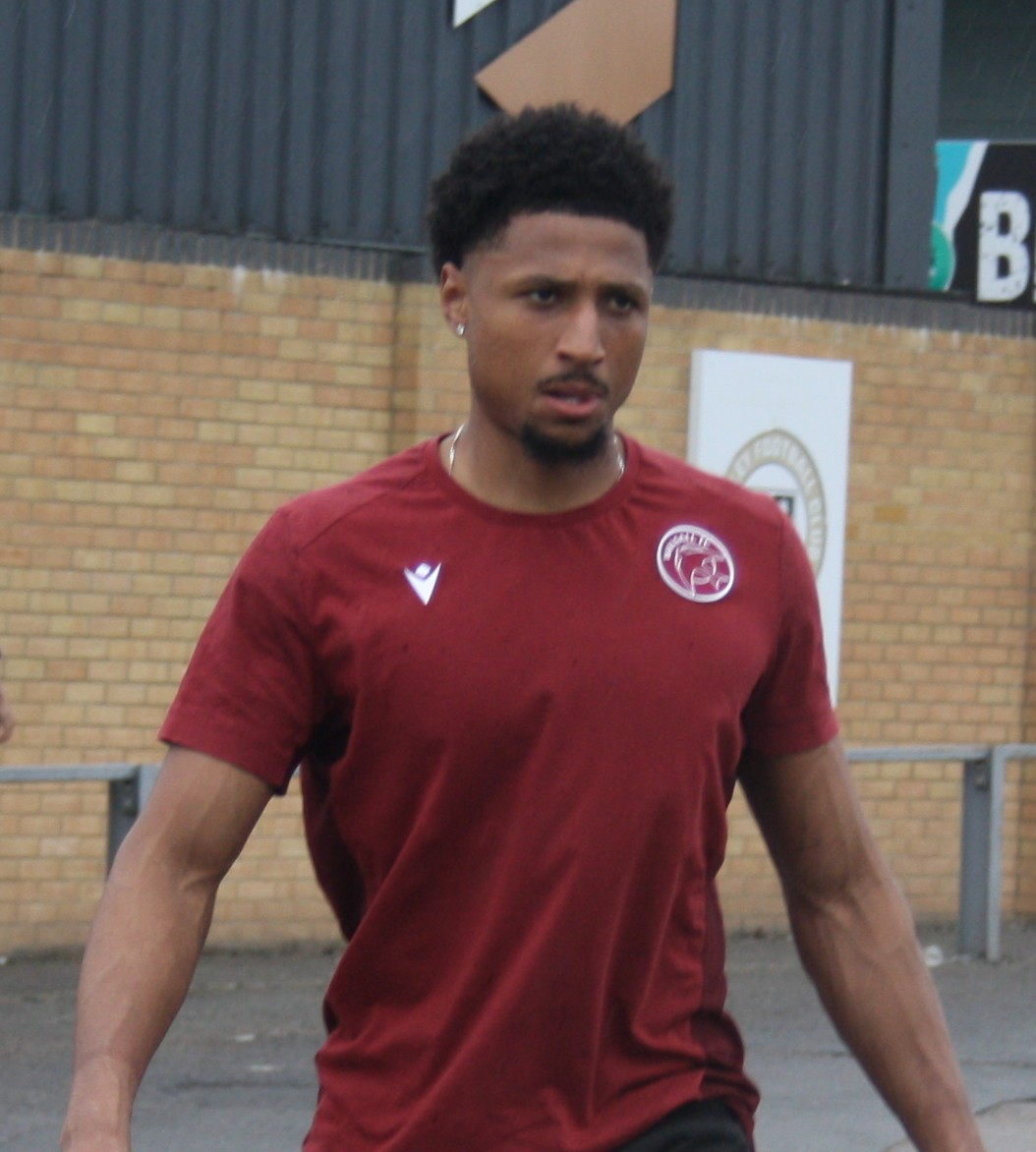
- Roberts in 2026

Personal information
- Full name: Myles Conrad Roberts
- Date of birth: 9 December 2001 (age 24)
- Place of birth: England
- Height: 1.93 m (6 ft 4 in)
- Position: Goalkeeper

Youth career
- Reading

Senior career*
Years	Team	Apps	(Gls)
2018–2019	Reading	0	(0)
2018–2019	→ Wealdstone (loan)	1	(0)
2019	→ Tonbridge Angels (loan)	5	(0)
2020–2026	Watford	0	(0)
2020	→ Wingate & Finchley (loan)	6	(0)
2021–2022	→ Concord Rangers (loan)	36	(0)
2022–2023	→ Welling United (loan)	29	(0)
2024–2025	→ Partick Thistle (loan)	19	(0)
2025	→ Bristol Rovers (loan)	0	(0)
2025–2026	→ Walsall (loan)	43	(0)
- * Club domestic league appearances and goals as of 08:54, 3 May 2026 (UTC)

Myles Conrad Roberts (born 12 December 2001) is an English footballer who plays as a goalkeeper most recently for EFL Championship club Watford.

== Career ==
=== Early career ===
During his early life, Roberts played as a striker for his local Sunday League team, before transitioning to the goalkeeper position.

Roberts began his professional career at Reading, coming through the club's youth sides. During his time with the club Roberts had short-term loan spells with Wealdstone and Tonbridge Angels.

=== Watford ===
After leaving Reading, Roberts signed with Watford in January 2020. Roberts has had multiple loan spells away from Watford, including full seasons with National League South clubs Concord Rangers and Welling United. During his time with Welling, Roberts was recalled by Watford in order to train with the club's first team squad. Despite the recall, Roberts still won the Welling United manager's player of the year award.

==== Partick Thistle (loan) ====
In July 2024 Roberts joined Scottish Championship club Partick Thistle on a season-long loan.

Roberts made his Partick Thistle debut in the opening league game of the 2024–25 season, keeping a clean sheet and earning the man of the match award in a 0–0 home draw with Greenock Morton. Roberts won Partick Thistle player of the month in his first month with the club, as voted for by Thistle supporters. Roberts once again won Partick Thistle player of the month in October 2024.

Following an impressive first half of the season with Thistle Roberts was recalled by Watford in January 2025.

==== Bristol Rovers (loan) ====
On 3 February 2025, Roberts joined League One side Bristol Rovers on loan for the remainder of the season. In April 2025, having still yet to make an appearance for the Gas, manager Iñigo Calderón confirmed that Roberts was to expected to return to his parent club for an operation.

==== Walsall (loan) ====
On 30 June 2025, Roberts joined League Two side Walsall on a season-long loan deal.

On 22 May 2026, Watford said it was releasing the player.
