= José Lara =

Spanish footballer

Personal information
- Full name: José Alonso Lara
- Date of birth: 7 March 2000 (age 26)
- Place of birth: Seville, Spain
- Height: 1.61 m (5 ft 3 in)
- Position: Winger

Team information
- Current team: Orihuela
- Number: 8

Youth career
- 2007–2017: Sevilla

Senior career*
Years	Team	Apps	(Gls)
2017–2020	Sevilla B	49	(6)
2018–2021	Sevilla	1	(0)
2020–2021	→ Deportivo La Coruña (loan)	22	(2)
2021–2023	Betis B	57	(2)
2023–2025	Alcoyano	59	(5)
2025–	Orihuela	25	(1)

International career
2017	Spain U17	20	(3)
2018	Spain U18	4	(0)
2018	Spain U19	2	(0)
Medal record
Men's football
Representing Spain
Mediterranean Games
Winner	2018 Spain
FIFA U-17 World Cup
Runner-up	2017 India
UEFA European Under-17 Championship
Winner	2017 Croatia
- * Club domestic league appearances and goals as of 16 May 2026

José Alonso Lara (born 7 March 2000) is a Spanish professional footballer who plays as a left winger for Segunda Federación club Orihuela.

== Club career ==
Born in Seville, Andalusia, Lara represented Sevilla FC as a youth. On 28 October 2016, while still a youth, he signed his first professional contract by agreeing to a deal until 2019.

On 3 December 2017, aged only 17, Lara made his professional debut with the reserves by starting in a 1–1 Segunda División home draw against CD Lugo. He scored his first goal the following 28 April, netting the game's only in a home defeat of AD Alcorcón.

Lara made his first team – and La Liga – debut on 19 May 2018, coming on as a late substitute for Nolito in a 1–0 home win against Deportivo Alavés. On 11 September 2020, he was loaned to Deportivo de La Coruña, freshly relegated to the third division, for one year.

Lara terminated his contract with Sevilla on 1 July 2021, and moved to crosstown rivals Real Betis twelve days later, being assigned to the B-team in Primera División RFEF.

== Honours ==
=== International ===
Spain U17

- UEFA European Under-17 Championship: Champion 2017
- FIFA Under-17 World Cup: Runner-up 2017

Spain U18

- Mediterranean Games: Gold Medal 2018
