= Roberto Nditi =

English footballer (born 2000)

Personal information
- Full name: Roberto Yohana Nditi
- Date of birth: 1 October 2000 (age 26)
- Place of birth: Basingstoke, England
- Height: 1.80 m (5 ft 11 in)
- Position: Defender

Team information
- Current team: Forfar Athletic

Youth career
- Reading

Senior career*
| Years | Team | Apps | (Gls) |
| 2019–2020 | Reading | 0 | (0) |
| 2019 | → Eastbourne Borough (loan) | 5 | (0) |
| 2020–2021 | Bracknell Town | 5 | (0) |
| 2021 | Forfar Athletic | 9 | (0) |
| 2021–2022 | Queen of the South | 27 | (0) |
| 2022– | Forfar Athletic | 41 | (1) |
- * Club domestic league appearances and goals as of 15:54, 14 January 2024 (UTC)

Roberto Yohana Nditi (born 1 October 2000) is an English footballer who plays for Scottish club Forfar Athletic as a defender.

== Club career ==
Born in Basingstoke, Nditi spent his early career with Reading, where he was captain of their under-16 team. He turned professional in June 2019, and in September 2019 he moved on loan to Eastbourne Borough. He was released by Reading at the end of the 2019–20 season, and after leaving Reading he played for Bracknell Town.

He signed with Forfar Athletic in February 2021, being linked with a transfer to Hearts, before moving to Queen of the South for the 2021–22 season. After one season he returned to Forfar.

== International career ==
Nditi was named in the provisional Tanzania squad for the delayed 2023 Africa Cup of Nations in January 2024, but he was not selected in their final squad list.

== Personal life ==
Born in England, Nditi has Tanzanian and Italian heritage. His father Eric is from Tanzania. His half-brother is former Chelsea trainee Adam Nditi, while his two younger brothers, twins Zion and Paulo, are also footballers.

== Style of play ==
Primarily a central defender, Nditi can play anywhere in defence.
