= Werick Caetano =

Brazilian footballer (born 1999)

Personal information
- Full name: Werick Maciel Caetano de Oliveira
- Date of birth: 25 April 1999 (age 27)
- Place of birth: Gurupi, Brazil
- Height: 1.83 m (6 ft 0 in)
- Position: Attacking midfielder

Team information
- Current team: Uttaradit

Youth career
- Sant Quirze
- Fruitosenc
- 2013–2014: Vic Riuprimer
- 2014–2016: Barcelona
- 2016–2017: Girona
- 2017–2018: Damm
- 2018–2019: Vasco da Gama
- 2019–2020: Reading

Senior career*
Years	Team	Apps	(Gls)
2020–2022	Miedź Legnica II	33	(9)
2022	→ Wigry Suwałki (loan)	12	(0)
2022–2023	Stomil Olsztyn	26	(2)
2024–2025	Beroe Stara Zagora	29	(0)
2024	→ SHB Da Nang (loan)	9	(3)
2025	Sancataldese	9	(1)
2025–2026	Tuttocuoio	3	(0)
2026–	Uttaradit	0	(0)
- * Club domestic league appearances and goals as of 1 March 2026

Werick Maciel Caetano de Oliveira (born 25 April 1999) is a Brazilian professional footballer who plays as an attacking midfielder for Thai League 2 club Uttaradit.

== Early life ==
Caetano is a native of Gurupi, Tocantins. He moved from Brazil to Spain at the age of seven, and holds a Spanish passport.

== Club career ==
On 8 October 2019, EFL Championship club Reading announced the signing of Caetano on a contract until the end of the season, with Caetano joining up with the U23s. On 2 July 2020, Reading announced that Caetano had left the club after his contract had expired.

In August 2024, Caetano moved to Vietnam, signing for V.League 1 club SHB Da Nang on a short term on deal.

== International career ==
He been called up to the Brazil national under-18 football team.

== Style of play ==
He has been described as a player with "exquisite technique, elegance in driving, dribbling and passing, good vision of the game and an effective arrival from second line thanks to its power".
