= Pedro Neves (footballer, born 2001) =

Portuguese footballer (born 2001)

Personal information
- Full name: Pedro Vinagre Pedrosa Neves
- Date of birth: 5 September 2001 (age 25)
- Place of birth: São Paulo, Brazil
- Height: 5 ft 10 in (1.78 m)
- Position: Midfielder

Youth career
- –2016: Charlton Athletic
- 2016–2019: Everton
- 2019–2020: Reading

Senior career*
Years	Team	Apps	(Gls)
2020	Cartagena		
2020	→ Yeclano (loan)		
2021–2023	Bragantino		
2021–2022	→ Red Bull Bragantino II (loan)	1	(0)
2022–2023	→ Resende (loan)	0	(0)
2023	→ Botafogo-PB (loan)		
- * Club domestic league appearances and goals as of 13:47, 24 September 2024 (UTC)

Pedro Vinagre Pedrosa Neves (born 5 September 2001) is footballer who plays as a winger for Red Bull Bragantino. He is known for his speed.

== Early life ==
Neves was born in Brazil and is the son of Sergio Neves. He moved to England at age 12 and was called up to represent Portugal at the youth international level.

== Career ==
On 2 July 2020 Neves was released by Reading at the end of his contract. On 10 August 2020, Cartagena announced the signing of Neves.
