= 2024–25 Luton Town F.C. season =

English football club season

Luton Town
2024–25 season
- Owner: Luton Town Football Club 2020 Ltd
- Chairman: David Wilkinson
- Manager: Rob Edwards (until 9 January); Matt Bloomfield (from 14 January)
- Stadium: Kenilworth Road
- Championship: 22nd (relegated)
- FA Cup: Third round
- EFL Cup: Second round
- Top goalscorer: League: Carlton Morris (8); All: Carlton Morris (8)
- Highest home attendance: 11,965 v Coventry City (26 Apr 2025, Championship)
- Lowest home attendance: 10,537 v Stoke City (10th Dec 2024, Championship)
- Average home league attendance: 11,555
- Biggest win: 3–0 v Watford (Home, 19 Oct 2024, Championship)
- Biggest defeat: 5–1 v Middlesbrough (Away, 9 Nov 2024, Championship); 4–0 v Burnley (Away, 8 Mar 2025, Championship)
Home colours	Away colours	Third colours

The 2024–25 season was the 139th season in the history of Luton Town Football Club and their first season back in the Championship, since the 2022–23 season following their relegation from the Premier League in the previous season. In addition to the domestic league, the club also took part in the FA Cup, and the EFL Cup.

Luton's season began poorly with the club failing to win any of their first 4 games despite being considered favourites for an immediate return to the Premier League.

On 9 January 2025, manager Rob Edwards left the club by mutual consent, three days after a 2–1 loss to Queens Park Rangers that left the Hatters 20th in the table, 2 points above the relegation zone. On 14 January 2025, Luton announced that Wycombe Wanderers manager Matt Bloomfield would take over from Edwards on a three-and-a-half year deal.

Luton's relegation to League One was confirmed on the final day of the season after they lost 5–3 away to West Bromwich Albion and Hull City drew 1–1 away to Portsmouth. This made Luton the fourth team in football league history to suffer back to back relegations from the first tier to the third tier and the first team since Sunderland in the 2017–18 season and the second team to suffer it at any tier twice after 2012–13 Wolves.

== Transfers ==
=== In ===
Date	Pos.	Player	From	Fee	Ref.
6 July 2024	CM	(Grenada) Shandon Baptiste	(England) Brentford	Free	
11 July 2024	RB	(England) Reuell Walters	(England) Arsenal	Free	
20 August 2024	CB	(Republic of Ireland) Mark McGuinness	(Wales) Cardiff City	Undisclosed	
20 August 2024	CM	(England) Liam Walsh	(Wales) Swansea City	Free	
30 August 2024	DM	(Spain) Lamine Fanne	(Sweden) AIK	Undisclosed	
10 September 2024	RM	(Nigeria) Victor Moses	(Russia) Spartak Moscow	Free	
19 December 2024	CB	(Netherlands) Erik Pieters	(England) West Bromwich Albion	Free	
1 January 2025 (Note: The transfer was announced on 31 December, and would become official on January 1 once the transfer window reopened.)	CB	(Republic of the Congo) Christ Makosso	(Belgium) RWD Molenbeek	Undisclosed	
10 January 2025	RW	(Guyana) Isaiah Jones	(England) Middlesbrough	Undisclosed	
28 January 2025	AM	(Norway) Thelo Aasgaard	(England) Wigan Athletic	Undisclosed	
30 January 2025	CF	(Republic of Ireland) Millenic Alli	(England) Exeter City	Undisclosed	
3 February 2025	CF	(Norway) Lasse Nordås	(Norway) Tromsø	Undisclosed	

=== Out ===
Date	Pos.	Player	To	Fee	Ref.
27 June 2024	LB	(England) Ryan Giles	(England) Hull City	Undisclosed	
1 July 2024	CM	(England) Ross Barkley	(England) Aston Villa	Undisclosed	
30 July 2024	CM	(England) Jake Burger	(England) Rochdale	Undisclosed	
9 August 2024	SS	(England) John McAtee	(England) Bolton Wanderers	Undisclosed	
28 August 2024	RW	(Republic of Ireland) Chiedozie Ogbene	(England) Ipswich Town	Undisclosed	
12 September 2024	RW	(England) Andros Townsend	(Turkey) Antalyaspor	Undisclosed	
10 January 2025	CF	(Wales) Joe Taylor	(England) Huddersfield Town	Undisclosed	
30 January 2025	CM	(Scotland) Allan Campbell	(Scotland) Dundee United	Free	
15 February 2025	CB	(England) Aidan Francis-Clarke	(England) Braintree Town	Free	
22 March 2025	RB	(England) Jacob Pinnington	(England) Braintree Town	Free	

=== Loaned in ===
Date	Pos.	Player	From	Date until	Ref.
22 August 2024	CM	(Germany) Tom Krauß	(Germany) Mainz 05	30 January 2025 (Note: On 30 January, Krauß's loan was terminated at the players request)	
28 January 2025	CB	(Scotland) Kal Naismith	(England) Bristol City	End of Season	
31 January 2025	RW	(England) Josh Bowler	(England) Nottingham Forest	End of Season	

=== Loaned out ===
Date	Pos.	Player	To	Date until	Ref.
1 July 2024 (Note: The loan was announced on 4 June, and would officially commence on July 1)	LW	(Antigua and Barbuda) Dion Pereira	(England) Dagenham & Redbridge	End of Season	
1 July 2024 (Note: The loan was announced on 25 June, and would officially commence on July 1)	GK	(England) Jack Walton	(Scotland) Dundee United	End of Season	
2 August 2024	RB	(England) Jacob Pinnington	(England) Solihull Moors	13 January 2025 (Note: On 13 January, Pinnington was recalled back from his loan at Solihull and was subsequently loaned to Braintree)	
7 August 2024	CM	(England) Axel Piesold	(Northern Ireland) Cliftonville	End of Season	
26 August 2024	CM	(Scotland) Allan Campbell	(England) Charlton Athletic	End of Season	
30 August 2024	DM	(Spain) Lamine Fanne	(Sweden) AIK	30 November 2024	
30 August 2024	CM	(England) Jayden Luker	(England) Grimsby Town	End of Season	
30 August 2024	CF	(Canada) Aribim Pepple	(England) Southend United	10 January 2025 (Note: On 10 January, Pepple was recalled back from his loan at Southend)	
20 September 2024	CF	(England) Oliver Lynch	(England) Dulwich Hamlet	5 January 2025 (Note: On 18 October, Lynch's loan at Dulwich Hamlet was extended until January)	
27 September 2024	GK	(Australia) Henry Blackledge	(England) Berkhamsted	26 October 2024	
27 September 2024	GK	(England) Jameson Horlick	(England) Dulwich Hamlet	26 October 2024	
18 October 2024	CB	(England) Jack Bateson	(England) Farnborough	16 November 2024	
25 October 2024	CB	(England) Josh Odell-Bature	(England) Bedford Town	23 November 2024	
7 January 2025	CF	(England) Oliver Lynch	(England) Hemel Hempstead Town	End of Season	
12 January 2025	CF	(Canada) Aribim Pepple	(England) Chesterfield	End of Season	
13 January 2025	CB	(England) Aidan Francis-Clarke	(England) Braintree Town	15 February 2025 (Note: On 15 February, Francis-Clarke's loan at Braintree was made permanent)	
13 January 2025	RB	(England) Jacob Pinnington	(England) Braintree Town	22 March 2025 (Note: On 22 March, Pinnington's loan at Braintree was made permanent)	
18 January 2025	GK	(England) Jameson Horlick	(England) Bedford Town	21 March 2025	
3 February 2025	CB	(England) Tom Holmes	(Belgium) Dender	End of Season	
3 February 2025	DM	(Democratic Republic of the Congo) Pelly Ruddock Mpanzu	(England) Rotherham United	End of Season	
3 February 2025	CF	(England) Cauley Woodrow	(England) Blackburn Rovers	End of Season	
19 March 2025	CM	(England) Jack Lorentzen-Jones	(England) Hemel Hempstead Town	End of Season	
21 March 2025	GK	(England) Jameson Horlick	(England) Hemel Hempstead Town	End of Season	
28 March 2025	DM	(Portugal) Dominic Dos Santos Martins	(England) Hitchin Town	End of Season	
28 March 2025	CF	(England) Tate Xavier-Jones	(England) Kettering Town	End of Season	

=== Released / Out of Contract ===
Date	Pos.	Player	Subsequent club	Join date	Ref.
30 June 2024	CM	(England) Luke Berry	(England) Charlton Athletic	1 July 2024	
30 June 2024	CM	(England) Millar Matthews-Lewis	(England) Farnborough	2 July 2024	
30 June 2024	CB	(England) Ben Tompkins	(England) Hemel Hempstead Town	4 July 2024	
30 June 2024	CB	(Nigeria) Gabriel Osho	(France) AJ Auxerre	11 July 2024	
30 June 2024	CF	(England) Josh Allen	(England) AFC Sudbury	29 July 2024	
30 June 2024	CF	(England) Archie Heron	(United States) Michigan State Spartans	1 August 2024	
30 June 2024	CF	(England) Tobias Braney	(England) Bowers & Pitsea	3 August 2024	
30 June 2024	LB	(England) Dan Potts	(England) Charlton Athletic	6 September 2024	
30 June 2024	AM	(Nigeria) Fred Onyedinma	(England) Wycombe Wanderers	10 September 2024	
30 June 2024	CM	(Wales) Elliot Thorpe	(England) Wealdstone	14 September 2024	
30 June 2024	CF	(Zimbabwe) Admiral Muskwe	(England) Harrogate Town	2 December 2024	
30 June 2024	GK	(Wales) Oliver Camis			
30 June 2024	CF	(England) Will Houghton			
30 June 2024	CB	(England) Max Scott			
30 August 2024	CM	(Republic of Ireland) Louie Watson	(England) Crawley Town	21 February 2025	
3 January 2025	CB	(England) Josh Odell-Bature	(England) Hitchin Town	3 January 2025	
19 January 2025	CB	(Netherlands) Erik Pieters	(England) Derby County	28 March 2025	

== Pre-season and friendlies ==
On 18 June, Luton announced their first pre-season friendly, against Dundee United. Two weeks later, a further four pre-season matches were confirmed, against AGF, Rukh Lviv, Göztepe and Celta Vigo.

Win Draw Loss Fixtures

9 July 2024 Friendly	Luton Town	3–0	Stevenage	Luton
14:00 BST	Morris 2' (pen.); Chong 16'; Taylor 50'	Report		Stadium: The Brache; Attendance: 0 (Behind-closed-doors)

13 July 2024 Friendly	Luton Town	1–2	AGF	Luton
13:00 BST	Morris 45+1'	Report	Links 14'; Andersen 76'	Stadium: The Brache; Attendance: 0 (Behind-closed-doors)

16 July 2024 Friendly	Rukh Lviv	0–1	Luton Town	TBC, Slovenia
15:00 CEST (14:00 BST)		Report	Morris 16'	Stadium: TBC; Attendance: 0 (Behind-closed-doors)

20 July 2024 Friendly	Göztepe	3–2	Luton Town	TBA, Slovenia
16:00 CEST (15:00 BST)		Report	Nelson 72', 89'	Stadium: TBA; Attendance: 0 (Behind-closed-doors)

26 July 2024 Friendly	Dundee United	2–2	Luton Town	Dundee
19:45 BST	Babunski 16'; Moult 76' (pen.)	Report	Clark 34' (pen.); Doughty 45+1'	Stadium: Tannadice Park

3 August 2024 Friendly	Luton Town	1–3	Celta Vigo	Luton
15:00 BST	Doughty 66'	Report	Swedberg 23'; Durán 84'; Aspas 88'	Stadium: Kenilworth Road; Attendance: 6,051

== Competitions ==
=== Championship ===
==== League table ====
Pos	Team	Pld	W	D	L	GF	GA	GD	Pts	Promotion, qualification or relegation
20	Preston North End	46	10	20	16	48	59	−11	50	
21	Hull City	46	12	13	21	44	54	−10	49	
22	Luton Town (R)	46	13	10	23	45	69	−24	49	Relegation to EFL League One
23	Plymouth Argyle (R)	46	11	13	22	51	88	−37	46	Relegation to EFL League One
24	Cardiff City (R)	46	9	17	20	48	73	−25	44	Relegation to EFL League One

Source: English Football League
Rules for classification: 1) Points; 2) Goal difference; 3) Number of goals scored; 4) Head-to-head results; 5) Wins; 6) Away goals; 7) Penalty points (sec 9.5); 8) Number of 12-point sending off offences; 9) Play-off (only if needed to determine promotion/relegation)
(R) Relegated

==== Results summary ====
Overall								Home						Away					
Pld	W	D	L	GF	GA	GD	Pts	W	D	L	GF	GA	GD	W	D	L	GF	GA	GD
46	13	10	23	45	69	−24	49	9	7	7	25	22	+3	4	3	16	20	47	−27

Last updated: 3 May 2025.
Source: Soccerway

==== Results by round ====
Round	1	2	3	4	5	6	7	8	9	10	11	12	13	14	15	16	17	18	19	20	21	22	23	24	25	26	27	28	29	30	32	33	31^{1}	34	35	36	37	38	39	40	41	42	43	44	45	46
Ground	H	A	A	H	A	H	A	H	A	H	H	A	H	H	A	H	A	A	H	H	A	H	A	A	H	A	H	A	H	A	A	H	H	A	H	A	A	H	A	H	A	H	A	H	H	A
Result	L	D	L	L	W	W	L	D	L	W	L	L	D	W	L	W	L	L	D	W	L	W	L	L	L	L	D	L	L	D	L	L	D	L	W	L	W	D	W	D	D	L	W	W	W	L
Position	23	20	23	23	19	15	18	20	21	17	19	22	21	19	21	16	16	19	18	15	19	15	18	19	20	20	23	23	23	23	24	24	24	24	22	23	23	23	23	23	23	23	22	22	21	22
Points	0	1	1	1	4	7	7	8	8	11	11	11	12	15	15	18	18	18	19	22	22	25	25	25	25	25	26	26	26	27	27	27	28	28	31	31	34	35	38	39	40	40	43	46	49	49

Source: EFL
A = Away; H = Home; W = Win; D = Draw; L = Loss; P = Postponed
Notes:
- ^{1} Matchday 31 (vs. Plymouth Argyle) was postponed due to Plymouth's involvement in the FA Cup.

==== Matches ====
The league fixtures were announced on 26 June 2024.

Win Draw Loss Fixtures

12 August 2024 1	Luton Town	1–4	Burnley	Luton
20:00 BST	Nelson (yellow card) 51'; Chong 55', (yellow card) 60'	Report	Brownhill 6'; Odobert 37'; Trafford (yellow card) 43'; Lucas Pires (yellow card) 59'; Cullen (yellow card) 62'; O'Shea 72'; Vitinho 81'	Stadium: Kenilworth Road; Attendance: 11,777; Referee: Matt Donohue

17 August 2024 2	Portsmouth	0–0	Luton Town	Portsmouth
12:30 BST	Shaughnessy (yellow card) 36'; Pack (yellow card) 42'; Dozzell (yellow card) 60'	Report	Kaminski (yellow card) 29' (yellow-red card) 31'; Clark (yellow card) 74'; Chong (yellow card) 85'	Stadium: Fratton Park; Attendance: 20,293; Referee: John Busby
Note: Fixture was initially scheduled for a 15:00 kick-off, but was moved for live Sky Sports broadcast.

24 August 2024 3	Preston North End	1–0	Luton Town	Preston
15:00 BST	Keane 39'; Whiteman (yellow card) 41'; Potts (yellow card) 43'; Frøkjær-Jensen (yellow card) 58'; Kesler-Hayden (yellow card) 72'; Greenwood (yellow card) 76'; Holmes (yellow card) 81'	Report	Baptiste (yellow card) 54'	Stadium: Deepdale; Attendance: 15,245; Referee: Dean Whitestone

30 August 2024 4	Luton Town	1–2	Queens Park Rangers	Luton
20:00 BST	Chong (yellow card) 2'; Dunne 18' (o.g.); Doughty (yellow card) 48'; Clark (yellow card) 79'	Report	Cook (yellow card) 30'; Field (yellow card) 51'; Madsen 59'; Frey 62'	Stadium: Kenilworth Road; Attendance: 11,798; Referee: Bobby Madley
Note: Fixture was initially scheduled for 31 August, but was moved for live Sky Sports broadcast.

14 September 2024 5	Millwall	0–1	Luton Town	Bermondsey
12:30 BST	De Norre (yellow card) 22'; Hutchinson (yellow card) 90+4'	Report	Mengi 10', (yellow card) 41'; Kaminski (yellow card) 85'; Doughty (yellow card) 89'	Stadium: The Den; Attendance: 14,804; Referee: Josh Smith
Note: Fixture was initially scheduled for a 15:00 kick-off, but was moved for live Sky Sports broadcast.

21 September 2024 6	Luton Town	2–1	Sheffield Wednesday	Luton
15:00 BST	Morris 77' (pen.), 88'; Burke (yellow card) 80'	Report	Bannan 52'; Bernard (yellow card) 67' (yellow-red card) 74'; Ingelsson (yellow card) 71'	Stadium: Kenilworth Road; Attendance: 11,805; Referee: Gavin Ward

27 September 2024 7	Plymouth Argyle	3–1	Luton Town	Plymouth
20:00 BST	Al Hajj 8'; Randell (yellow card) 36'; Cissoko 69', 90+3'	Report	Adebayo (yellow card) 15'; Moses 71'; Walters (yellow card) 83'; Burke (yellow card) 87'; Clark (yellow card) 87'	Stadium: Home Park; Attendance: 16,616; Referee: John Busby
Note: Fixture was initially scheduled for 28 September, but was moved for live Sky Sports broadcast.

1 October 2024 8	Luton Town	2–2	Oxford United	Luton
19:45 BST	Clark 10'; Krauß 37'; Doughty (yellow card) 56'; Walsh (red card) 77'; Mpanzu (yellow card) 90+6'; Burke (yellow card) 90+7'	Report	Goodrham 45'; Kioso (yellow card) 48'; Rodrigues 54'; El Mizouni (yellow card) 68'; Moore (yellow card) 89'	Stadium: Kenilworth Road; Attendance: 11,397; Referee: James Bell

5 October 2024 9	Sheffield United	2–0	Luton Town	Sheffield
15:00 BST	Rak-Sakyi 12', 52'; Ahmedhodžić (yellow card) 27'; Arblaster (yellow card) 33'	Report	Walters (yellow card) 29'	Stadium: Bramall Lane; Attendance: 27,925; Referee: John Brooks

19 October 2024 10	Luton Town	3–0	Watford	Luton
12:30 BST	Clark 11', (yellow card) 16'; Doughty (yellow card) 35'; Morris 47'; Hashioka (yellow card) 61'; Brown 90+1'	Report	Bayo (yellow card) 6'; Porteous (yellow card) 37'	Stadium: Kenilworth Road; Attendance: 11,758; Referee: Stephen Martin

23 October 2024 11	Luton Town	1–2	Sunderland	Luton
19:45 BST	Adebayo 63'; Holmes (yellow card) 90+8'; Morris (yellow card) 90+8'	Report	Rigg (yellow card) 29', (goal) 55'; Mundle 66'; Patterson (yellow card) 73'; Bellingham (yellow card) 90+8'; O'Nien (yellow card) 90+8'	Stadium: Kenilworth Road; Attendance: 11,332; Referee: Tom Nield

26 October 2024 12	Coventry City	3–2	Luton Town	Coventry
12:30 BST	Kitching (yellow card) 13'; Simms 59'; Torp 76'; Sheaf (yellow card) 80'; Wright 90+1'	Report	Morris 15' (pen.), (yellow card) 18'; Doughty (yellow card) 17'; McGuinness (yellow card) 22'; Adebayo 37'; Holmes (yellow card) 54' (yellow-red card) 90'	Stadium: Coventry Building Society Arena; Attendance: 26,409; Referee: Bobby Madley
Note: Fixture was initially scheduled for a 15:00 kick-off, but was moved for live Sky Sports broadcast.

1 November 2024 13	Luton Town	1–1	West Bromwich Albion	Luton
20:00 GMT	Chong 60'; Bell (yellow card) 90'	Report	Furlong (yellow card) 41'; Maja 45+4'; Styles (yellow card) 55'	Stadium: Kenilworth Road; Attendance: 11,665; Referee: Dean Whitestone
Note: Fixture was initially scheduled for 2 November, but was moved for live Sky Sports broadcast.

6 November 2024 14	Luton Town	1–0	Cardiff City	Luton
20:00 GMT	Morris (yellow card) 43'; Brown 57'; Mengi (yellow card) 84'	Report	Goutas (yellow card) 86'	Stadium: Kenilworth Road; Attendance: 10,655; Referee: Matt Donohue
Note: Fixture was initially scheduled for a 19:45 kick-off, but was moved for live Sky Sports broadcast.

9 November 2024 15	Middlesbrough	5–1	Luton Town	Middlesbrough
12:30 GMT	Burgzorg 30', 54', (yellow card) 31'; Latte Lath 42'; Azaz 51', 87'	Report	Baptiste (yellow card) 15'; Hashioka (yellow card) 49'; Clark (yellow card) 62', (goal) 77'; Morris (yellow card) 66'	Stadium: Riverside Stadium; Attendance: 23,692; Referee: Tony Harrington
Note: Fixture was initially scheduled for a 15:00 kick-off, but was moved for live Sky Sports broadcast.

23 November 2024 16	Luton Town	1–0	Hull City	Luton
15:00 GMT	Burke (yellow card) 22'; McGuinness 33'; Nakamba (yellow card) 39'	Report	Coyle (yellow card) 37'	Stadium: Kenilworth Road; Attendance: 11,386; Referee: Thomas Bramall

27 November 2024 17	Leeds United	3–0	Luton Town	Leeds
19:45 GMT	Byram 10'; Piroe 45+1'; James 81'; Ramazani (yellow card) 90'	Report	Hashioka (yellow card) 50'; Clark (yellow card) 68'	Stadium: Elland Road; Attendance: 35,340; Referee: Sam Allison
Note: Fixture was initially scheduled for 26 November, but was moved for live Sky Sports broadcast.

30 November 2024 18	Norwich City	4–2	Luton Town	Norwich
15:00 GMT	Crnac 25', 33'; Hernández (yellow card) 63'; Marcondes 81'; Sainz 86'	Report	Adebayo 20'; Brown 48'; McGuinness (yellow card) 71'; Woodrow (yellow card) 74'	Stadium: Carrow Road; Attendance: 26,719; Referee: Josh Smith

7 December 2024 19	Luton Town	1–1	Swansea City	Luton
15:00 GMT	Adebayo 17'	Report	Grimes 64'	Stadium: Kenilworth Road; Attendance: 11,264; Referee: James Bell

10 December 2024 20	Luton Town	2–1	Stoke City	Luton
19:45 GMT	Morris 24'; Chong (yellow card) 55'; Adebayo 90'	Report	Cannon 6'; Burger (yellow card) 85'; Koumas (yellow card) 89'	Stadium: Kenilworth Road; Attendance: 10,537; Referee: Tom Nield

14 December 2024 21	Blackburn Rovers	2–0	Luton Town	Blackburn
15:00 GMT	Pickering (yellow card) 1'; Cozier-Duberry 32'; Beck 40'; Gueye (yellow card) 52'; Rankin-Costello (yellow card) 61'	Report	Clark (yellow card) 3'; Brown (yellow card) 60'; Walsh (red card) 73'	Stadium: Ewood Park; Attendance: 13,857; Referee: Michael Salisbury

20 December 2024 22	Luton Town	2–1	Derby County	Luton
20:00 GMT	Andersen (yellow card) 37'; Holmes 89'; Morris 90+2'	Report	Phillips (yellow card) 41'; Jackson 58'; Elder (yellow card) 67'; Nelson (yellow card) 89'	Stadium: Kenilworth Road; Attendance: 11,667; Referee: Andrew Kitchen
Note: Fixture was initially scheduled for 21 December, but was moved for live Sky Sports broadcast.

26 December 2024 23	Bristol City	1–0	Luton Town	Bristol
15:00 GMT	Twine 47', (yellow card) 58'; Dickie (yellow card) 85'	Report	Morris (yellow card) 58'	Stadium: Ashton Gate; Attendance: 21,828; Referee: Peter Bankes

29 December 2024 24	Swansea City	2–1	Luton Town	Swansea
15:00 GMT	Franco 38'; Peart-Harris 90+1'; Grimes (yellow card) 90+6'	Report	Morris 5'; McGuinness (yellow card) 30'; Johnson (yellow card) 31' (yellow-red card) 68'; Clark (yellow card) 60'	Stadium: Swansea.com Stadium; Attendance: 16,414; Referee: Farai Hallam

1 January 2025 25	Luton Town	0–1	Norwich City	Luton
15:00 GMT	Nelson (yellow card) 38'	Report	Núñez 73'; Doyle (yellow card) 89'	Stadium: Kenilworth Road; Attendance: 11,828; Referee: Jarred Gillett

6 January 2025 26	Queens Park Rangers	2–1	Luton Town	Shepherd's Bush
20:00 GMT	Frey 24'; Varane (yellow card) 49'; Fox 62'	Report	McGuinness 45+2'; Chong (yellow card) 56'	Stadium: Loftus Road; Attendance: 14,025; Referee: Andy Davies
Note: Fixture was initially scheduled for 4 January, but was moved for live Sky Sports broadcast.

18 January 2025 27	Luton Town	0–0	Preston North End	Luton
15:00 GMT	Brown (yellow card) 42'; Holmes (yellow card) 55'; Morris (yellow card) 62'	Report	Storey (yellow card) 17'; Hughes (yellow card) 69'	Stadium: Kenilworth Road; Attendance: 11,540; Referee: Tim Robinson

21 January 2025 28	Oxford United	3–2	Luton Town	Oxford
19:45 GMT	Phillips (yellow card) 10'; Helik 22'; Brown 59'; Leigh 69'; Brannagan (yellow card) 83'	Report	Krauß 11', (yellow card) 38'; Nelson (yellow card) 24'; McGuinness 26'; Jones (yellow card) 50'	Stadium: Kassam Stadium; Attendance: 11,035; Referee: Stephen Martin

25 January 2025 29	Luton Town	0–1	Millwall	Luton
12:30 GMT	Andersen (yellow card) 74'; Walsh (yellow card) 90+8'	Report	Connolly (penalty missed) 34'; Ivanović 61'; Saville (yellow card) 71'; Cooper (yellow card) 74'; Honeyman (yellow card) 88'; Tanganga (yellow card) 90+7'	Stadium: Kenilworth Road; Attendance: 11,418; Referee: Gavin Ward
Note: Fixture was initially scheduled for a 15:00 kick-off, but was moved for live Sky Sports broadcast.

1 February 2025 30	Sheffield Wednesday	1–1	Luton Town	Sheffield
15:00 GMT	Smith 60' (pen.); Bernard (yellow card) 75'	Report	Doughty 31'; Kaminski (yellow card) 67'	Stadium: Hillsborough Stadium; Attendance: 27,437; Referee: Ben Toner

12 February 2025 32	Sunderland	2–0	Luton Town	Sunderland
19:45 GMT	Le Fée 13'; Isidor 58'	Report	Fanne (yellow card) 54'; Johnson (yellow card) 90+4'	Stadium: Stadium of Light; Attendance: 37,929; Referee: John Busby

15 February 2025 33	Luton Town	0–1	Sheffield United	Luton
15:00 GMT	Nakamba (yellow card) 62'	Report	Ahmedhodžić (yellow card) 22', (goal) 79'; Souza (yellow card) 30'; Clarke (yellow card) 33'	Stadium: Kenilworth Road; Attendance: 11,461; Referee: Lewis Smith

19 February 2025 31	Luton Town	1–1	Plymouth Argyle	Luton
19:45 GMT	Brown 55'	Report	Talovierov 70'; Szűcs (yellow card) 77'; Bundu (yellow card) 90+1'	Stadium: Kenilworth Road; Attendance: 11,752; Referee: James Linington
Note: Fixture was initially scheduled for 8 February, but was moved due to Plymouth's FA Cup involvements.

23 February 2025 34	Watford	2–0	Luton Town	Watford
15:00 GMT	Ngakia (yellow card) 5'; Dele-Bashiru 11' (pen.); Kayembe 23'; Pollock (yellow card) 58'	Report	Andersen (yellow card) 42'; Morris (yellow card) 73'	Stadium: Vicarage Road; Attendance: 20,252; Referee: Andrew Kitchen
Note: Fixture was initially scheduled for 22 February, but was moved on request from local police.

1 March 2025 35	Luton Town	1–0	Portsmouth	Luton
15:00 GMT	Clark 25'; Brown (yellow card) 55'; Kaminski (yellow card) 90'	Report	Dozzell (yellow card) 5'; Ritchie (yellow card) 16'; Murphy (yellow card) 39'; Saydee (yellow card) 90+5'	Stadium: Kenilworth Road; Attendance: 11,662; Referee: Sam Allison

8 March 2025 36	Burnley	4–0	Luton Town	Burnley
15:00 GMT	Cullen (yellow card) 16'; McGuinness 30' (o.g.); Foster 39'; Lucas Pires (yellow card) 41'; Brownhill 53'; Estève (yellow card) 89'; Barnes 90+4'	Report	Naismith (yellow card) 12' (yellow-red card) 19'; Clark (yellow card) 53'; Nelson (yellow card) 80'	Stadium: Turf Moor; Attendance: 19,453; Referee: Stephen Martin

11 March 2025 37	Cardiff City	1–2	Luton Town	Cardiff
19:45 GMT	Chambers 50'; O'Dowda (yellow card) 67'	Report	Clark 57'; Jones (yellow card) 78'; Aasgaard 80'	Stadium: Cardiff City Stadium; Attendance: 16,641; Referee: Andy Davies

15 March 2025 38	Luton Town	0–0	Middlesbrough	Luton
15:00 GMT	Brown (yellow card) 64'; Walsh (yellow card) 67'	Report	Iling-Junior (yellow card) 24'; Dijksteel (yellow card) 75'; Hackney (yellow card) 89'	Stadium: Kenilworth Road; Attendance: 11,815; Referee: Farai Hallam

29 March 2025 39	Hull City	0–1	Luton Town	Kingston upon Hull
12:30 GMT		Report	A. Jones 46' (o.g.)	Stadium: MKM Stadium; Attendance: 23,005; Referee: Darren Bond
Note: Fixture was initially scheduled for a 15:00 kick-off, but was moved for live Sky Sports broadcast.

5 April 2025 40	Luton Town	1–1	Leeds United	Luton
12:30 BST	Jones 15', (yellow card) 22'	Report	James 28'; Bogle (yellow card) 40'; Solomon (yellow card) 59'	Stadium: Kenilworth Road; Attendance: 11,867; Referee: Thomas Bramall
Note: Fixture was initially scheduled for a 15:00 kick-off, but was moved for live Sky Sports broadcast.

8 April 2025 41	Stoke City	1–1	Luton Town	Stoke-on-Trent
19:45 BST	Tchamadeu (yellow card) 47'; Bae Jun-ho (yellow card) 50'; Baker 74'	Report	McGuinness (yellow card) 4'; Morris (yellow card) 42'; Alli 90+1'	Stadium: Bet365 Stadium; Attendance: 21,226; Referee: Dean Whitestone

12 April 2025 42	Luton Town	0–1	Blackburn Rovers	Luton
15:00 BST	Mengi (yellow card) 73'	Report	Travis (yellow card) 27'; Montgomery (yellow card) 47' (yellow-red card) 58'; Ōhashi 52'; Dolan (yellow card) 67'; Tóth (yellow card) 87'	Stadium: Kenilworth Road; Attendance: 11,552; Referee: David Webb

18 April 2025 43	Derby County	0–1	Luton Town	Derby
12:30 BST	Langås (yellow card) 29'; Jackson (yellow card) 90+5'	Report	Alli 10', (yellow card) 68'; Morris (yellow card) 38'	Stadium: Pride Park Stadium; Attendance: 32,159; Referee: James Linington
Note: Fixture was initially scheduled for a 15:00 kick-off, but was moved for live Sky Sports broadcast.

21 April 2025 44	Luton Town	3–1	Bristol City	Luton
15:00 BST	Aasgaard 49'; Morris 59'; Jones 72'	Report	McCrorie (yellow card) 22'; Tanner 52'; Earthy (yellow card) 82'; Knight (yellow card) 83'	Stadium: Kenilworth Road; Attendance: 11,874; Referee: John Busby

26 April 2025 45	Luton Town	1–0	Coventry City	Luton
12:30 BST	Walsh (yellow card) 65' (red card) 68'; Morris (yellow card) 69'; Jones (yellow card) 86'; Baptiste 90'	Report	Dasilva (red card) 13'; Binks (yellow card) 45+5'; Collins (yellow card) 58'; Sheaf (yellow card) 69'; Grimes (yellow card) 84'; Eccles (yellow card) 86'	Stadium: Kenilworth Road; Attendance: 11,965; Referee: Oliver Langford
Note: Fixture was initially scheduled for a 15:00 kick-off, but was moved for live Sky Sports broadcast.

3 May 2025 46	West Bromwich Albion	5–3	Luton Town	West Bromwich
12:30 BST	Fellows 7', 33'; Dike 30'; Styles 57', 61'; Ajayi (yellow card) 73'; Furlong (yellow card) 90+5'	Report	Alli 9', 88'; Clark 65', (yellow card) 90+4'; Aasgaard (yellow card) 72'	Stadium: The Hawthorns; Attendance: 25,615; Referee: Darren Bond
Note: Fixture was initially scheduled for a 15:00 kick-off, but all EFL Championship final matchday fixtures were moved to an earlier kick-off.

=== FA Cup ===
As a Championship side, Luton entered the FA Cup in the third round, where they were drawn away to Premier League side Nottingham Forest.

Win Draw Loss Fixtures

11 January 2025 Third round	Nottingham Forest	2–0	Luton Town	West Bridgford
15:00 GMT	Yates 40'; Sosa 68'	Report		Stadium: City Ground; Attendance: 29,445; Referee: Darren England

=== EFL Cup ===
As a top two Championship side, Luton entered the EFL Cup in the second round, where they were drawn away to fellow Championship side Queens Park Rangers.

Win Draw Loss Fixtures

27 August 2024 Second round	Queens Park Rangers	1–1 (4–1 p)	Luton Town	Shepherd's Bush
19:45 BST	Santos 11', (yellow card) 33'; Colback (yellow card) 48'; Celar (yellow card) 84'	Report	Nelson 16'; Walters (yellow card) 40'; Morris (yellow card) 72'	Stadium: Loftus Road; Attendance: 7,132; Referee: Leigh Doughty
	Penalties
	Celar (penalty scored); Dembélé (penalty scored); Clarke-Salter (penalty scored); Paal (penalty scored)		(penalty missed) Woodrow; (penalty scored) Doughty; (penalty missed) Chong

== Statistics ==
=== Appearances and goals ===
As of match played 3 May 2025

Players with no appearances are not included on the list
Italics indicate a loaned in player

No.	Pos	Nat	Player	Total		Championship		FA Cup		EFL Cup	
No.	Pos	Nat	Player	Apps	Goals	Apps	Goals	Apps	Goals	Apps	Goals
1	GK	(England) ENG	James Shea	2	0	1+1	0	0	0	0	0
2	DF	(England) ENG	Reuell Walters	16	0	11+3	0	1	0	1	0
3	DF	(Jamaica) JAM	Amari'i Bell	33	0	31	0	1	0	1	0
5	DF	(Denmark) DEN	Mads Juel Andersen	9	0	5+3	0	0	0	0+1	0
6	DF	(Republic of Ireland) IRL	Mark McGuinness	44	3	41+2	3	1	0	0	0
7	FW	(Nigeria) NGR	Victor Moses	18	1	12+6	1	0	0	0	0
8	MF	(Norway) NOR	Thelo Aasgaard	17	2	17	2	0	0	0	0
9	FW	(England) ENG	Carlton Morris	43	8	37+4	8	1	0	1	0
10	FW	(England) ENG	Cauley Woodrow	16	0	1+14	0	0	0	0+1	0
11	FW	(England) ENG	Elijah Adebayo	41	5	31+8	5	0+1	0	1	0
12	DF	(Scotland) SCO	Kal Naismith	10	0	5+5	0	0	0	0	0
13	MF	(Zimbabwe) ZIM	Marvelous Nakamba	23	0	15+6	0	1	0	1	0
14	FW	(Netherlands) NED	Tahith Chong	31	2	24+6	2	0	0	1	0
15	DF	(England) ENG	Teden Mengi	20	1	17+3	1	0	0	0	0
16	DF	(England) ENG	Reece Burke	18	0	10+7	0	0	0	1	0
17	MF	(Democratic Republic of the Congo) COD	Pelly Ruddock Mpanzu	9	0	1+8	0	0	0	0	0
18	MF	(England) ENG	Jordan Clark	42	6	37+3	6	0+1	0	1	0
19	FW	(Scotland) SCO	Jacob Brown	30	4	11+18	4	0+1	0	0	0
20	MF	(England) ENG	Liam Walsh	28	0	18+8	0	1	0	0+1	0
21	FW	(Republic of Ireland) IRL	Millenic Alli	16	4	6+10	4	0	0	0	0
22	MF	(Spain) ESP	Lamine Fanne	13	0	6+6	0	1	0	0	0
24	GK	(Belgium) BEL	Thomas Kaminski	47	0	45	0	1	0	1	0
25	FW	(Guyana) GUY	Isaiah Jones	18	2	16+1	2	1	0	0	0
26	MF	(Grenada) GRN	Shandon Baptiste	17	1	7+9	1	0	0	0+1	0
27	DF	(Japan) JPN	Daiki Hashioka	17	0	12+5	0	0	0	0	0
28	DF	(Republic of the Congo) CGO	Christ Makosso	13	0	12+1	0	0	0	0	0
29	DF	(Wales) WAL	Tom Holmes	20	1	15+3	1	1	0	0+1	0
37	MF	(England) ENG	Zack Nelson	23	1	7+14	0	1	0	1	1
38	DF	(England) ENG	Joe Johnson	8	0	5+3	0	0	0	0	0
43	MF	(England) ENG	Josh Phillips	1	0	0+1	0	0	0	0	0
44	FW	(Norway) NOR	Lasse Nordås	10	0	2+8	0	0	0	0	0
45	MF	(England) ENG	Alfie Doughty	27	1	25+1	1	0	0	1	0
47	FW	(England) ENG	Josh Bowler	8	0	0+8	0	0	0	0	0
Player(s) who featured whilst on loan but returned to parent club during the season:
8	MF	(Germany) GER	Tom Krauß	23	2	20+3	2	0	0	0	0
Player(s) who featured but departed the club permanently during the season:
7	FW	(Republic of Ireland) IRL	Chiedozie Ogbene	3	0	3	0	0	0	0	0
25	FW	(Wales) WAL	Joe Taylor	13	0	0+13	0	0	0	0	0
30	FW	(England) ENG	Andros Townsend	1	0	0+1	0	0	0	0	0

== New stadium ==
In December 2024, the club announced that its plans to build a new stadium at the Power Court site had been approved by Luton Borough Council. The plan involves the construction of a 25,000 capacity stadium at the Luton town centre with a hotel and a music venue.
