= Joe Johnson (footballer, born 2006) =

English footballer (born 2006)

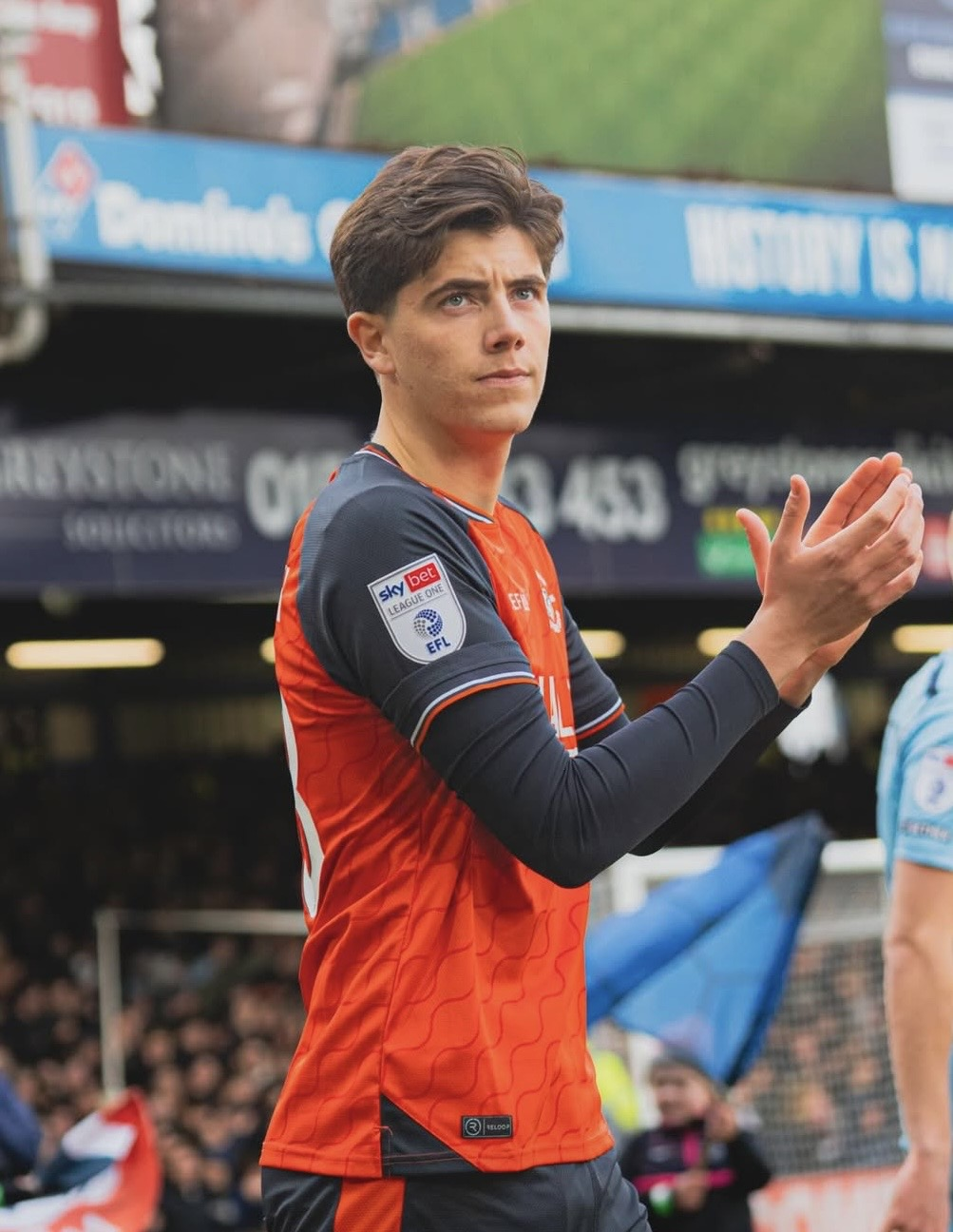
- Johnson in 2026

Personal information
- Full name: Joseph Nathan Johnson
- Date of birth: 21 February 2006 (age 20)
- Place of birth: Barnet, England
- Height: 6 ft 4 in (1.93 m)
- Position: Left-back

Team information
- Current team: Luton Town
- Number: 12

Youth career
- 2009–2012: Pro FA FC (was TFA Totteridge)
- 2012–2016: Arsenal
- 2016–2020: Focus Football
- 2020–2023: Luton Town

Senior career*
Years	Team	Apps	(Gls)
2023–	Luton Town	34	(0)

International career^{‡}
2023	England U17	1	(0)
2023–2024	England U18	5	(0)
2024–2025	England U19	10	(0)
- * Club domestic league appearances and goals as of 18:39, 31 October 2026 (UTC) ‡ National team caps and goals as of 10:49, 15 June 2025 (UTC)

Joseph Nathan Johnson (born 21 February 2006) is an English professional footballer who plays as a left-back for EFL League One club Luton Town.

== Club career ==
Born in the London Borough of Barnet, Johnson began his career with Arsenal, joining at the age of six from Pro FA FC (was TFA Totteridge). After being released by Arsenal four years later, he spent time in the Focus Football Academy, before joining Luton Town in 2020. He signed his first professional contract with Luton Town in March 2023.

After three years in the academy of the Hatters, Johnson made his professional debut on 24 April 2023, coming on as a second-half substitute for Alfie Doughty in a 2–1 win against Middlesbrough. In doing so, he became the first academy graduate to make their debut for the club in the Championship in fifteen years. He would make another appearance on the last day of the season against Hull City.

Johnson made his first start for the club in a 1–0 EFL Cup loss to Exeter City on 26 September 2023. His next appearance and FA Cup debut came four months later in a 2–1 win away to Everton, coming on as a substitute for Alfie Doughty in the 76th minute. Johnson would make his Premier League debut on 13 April 2024, coming on for Jordan Clark in the 88th minute against Manchester City, who he also came on as a substitute against in the FA Cup two months prior. His second Premier League appearance came on the last day of the season against Fulham, again coming off the bench as a substitute.

Johnson's first League start came on the opening day of the 2024–25 Season against Burnley.

== International career ==
Johnson was called up to the England under-18 squad in October 2023, featuring in three friendly matches in Marbella, Spain. He made more appearances for the U18 side starting in a Tri-Nations tournament fixture against Northern Ireland.

Johnson was called up to the England under-17 squad for the 2023 FIFA U-17 World Cup. He made his only appearance starting in a group stage victory over Iran. He did not feature in their round of sixteen elimination against Uzbekistan.

On 4 September 2024, Johnson made his England U19 debut against Italy in Nedelišće. He was a member of the squad at the 2025 UEFA European Under-19 Championship and came off the bench as a late substitute in their opening game of the tournament against Norway.

== Career statistics ==
=== Club ===
As of match played 17 November 2026

Appearances and goals by club, season and competition
Club	Season	League			FA Cup		League Cup		Other		Total	
Club	Season	Division	Apps	Goals	Apps	Goals	Apps	Goals	Apps	Goals	Apps	Goals
Luton Town	2022–23	Championship	2	0	0	0	0	0	–		2	0
Luton Town	2023–24	Premier League	2	0	2	0	1	0	–		5	0
Luton Town	2024–25	Championship	8	0	0	0	0	0	–		8	0
Luton Town	2025–26	League One	18	0	1	0	0	0	2 (Note: Appearances in EFL Trophy)	0	21	0
Luton Town	2026–27	League One	4	0	1	0	1	0	2	1	8	1
Career total			34	0	4	0	2	0	4	1	44	1
