= Teden Mengi =

English footballer (born 2002)

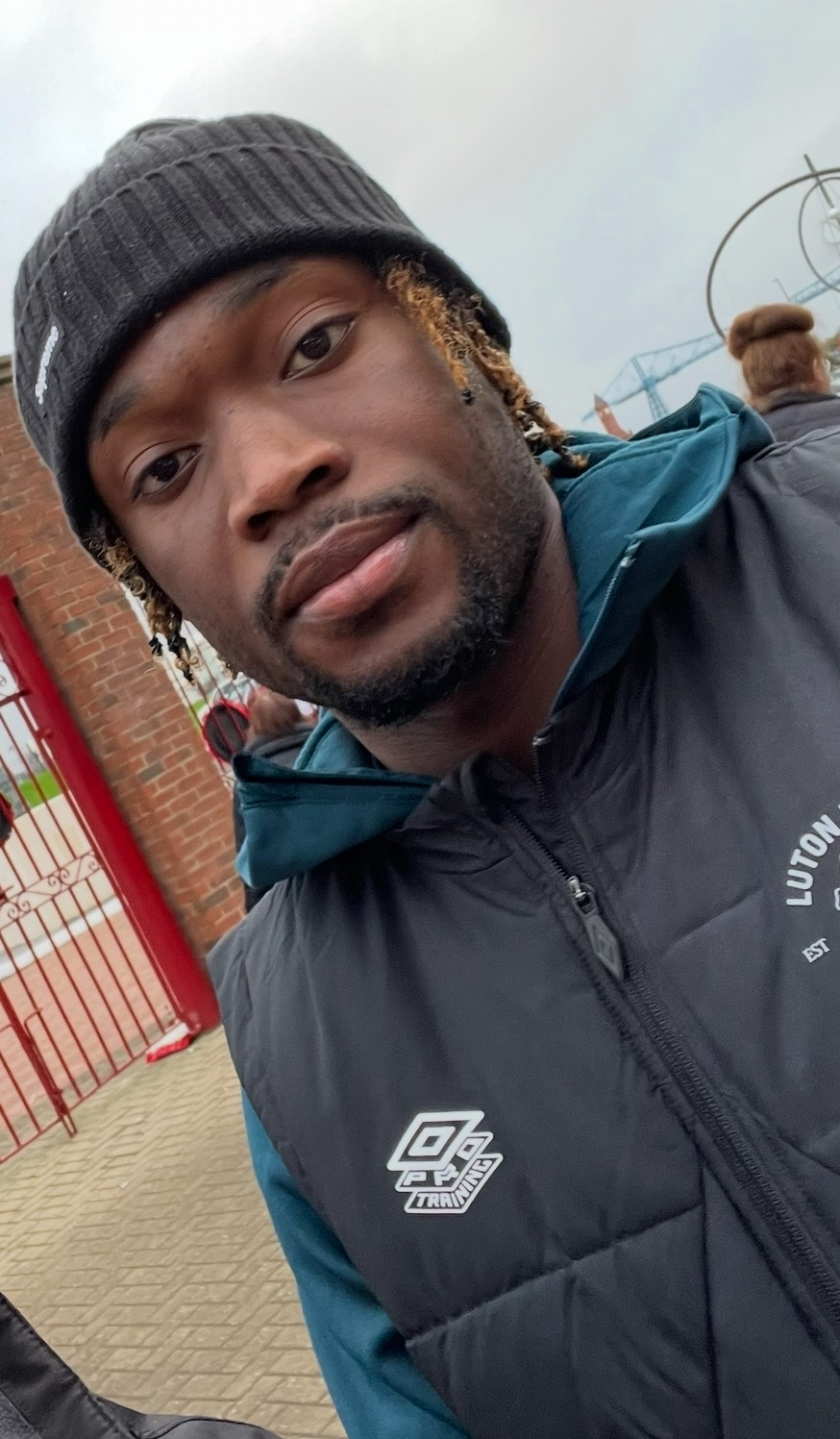
- Mengi with Luton Town in 2024

Personal information
- Full name: Teden Mambuene Mengi
- Date of birth: 30 April 2002 (age 24)
- Place of birth: Manchester, England
- Height: 6 ft 0 in (1.83 m)
- Position: Centre-back

Team information
- Current team: Luton Town
- Number: 15

Youth career
- 2009–2019: Manchester United

Senior career*
Years	Team	Apps	(Gls)
2019–2023	Manchester United	0	(0)
2021	→ Derby County (loan)	9	(0)
2022	→ Birmingham City (loan)	9	(0)
2023–	Luton Town	72	(2)

International career^{‡}
2016	England U15	2	(0)
2018	England U16	4	(0)
2018–2019	England U17	6	(0)
2019	England U18	4	(0)
2021	England U20	1	(0)
2024	England U21	3	(0)
- * Club domestic league appearances and goals as of 18:59, 21 November 2026 (UTC) ‡ National team caps and goals as of 19:41, 7 December 2024 (UTC)

Teden Mambuene Mengi (born 30 April 2002) is an English professional footballer who plays as a centre-back for EFL League One club Luton Town.

Mengi is a graduate of the Manchester United youth system. He made his senior debut for the club in the UEFA Europa League in August 2020. He had spells on loan at Derby County in 2021 and Birmingham City in 2022. He is an England youth international and has represented the country from under-15 to under-21 level.

== Club career ==
=== Manchester United ===
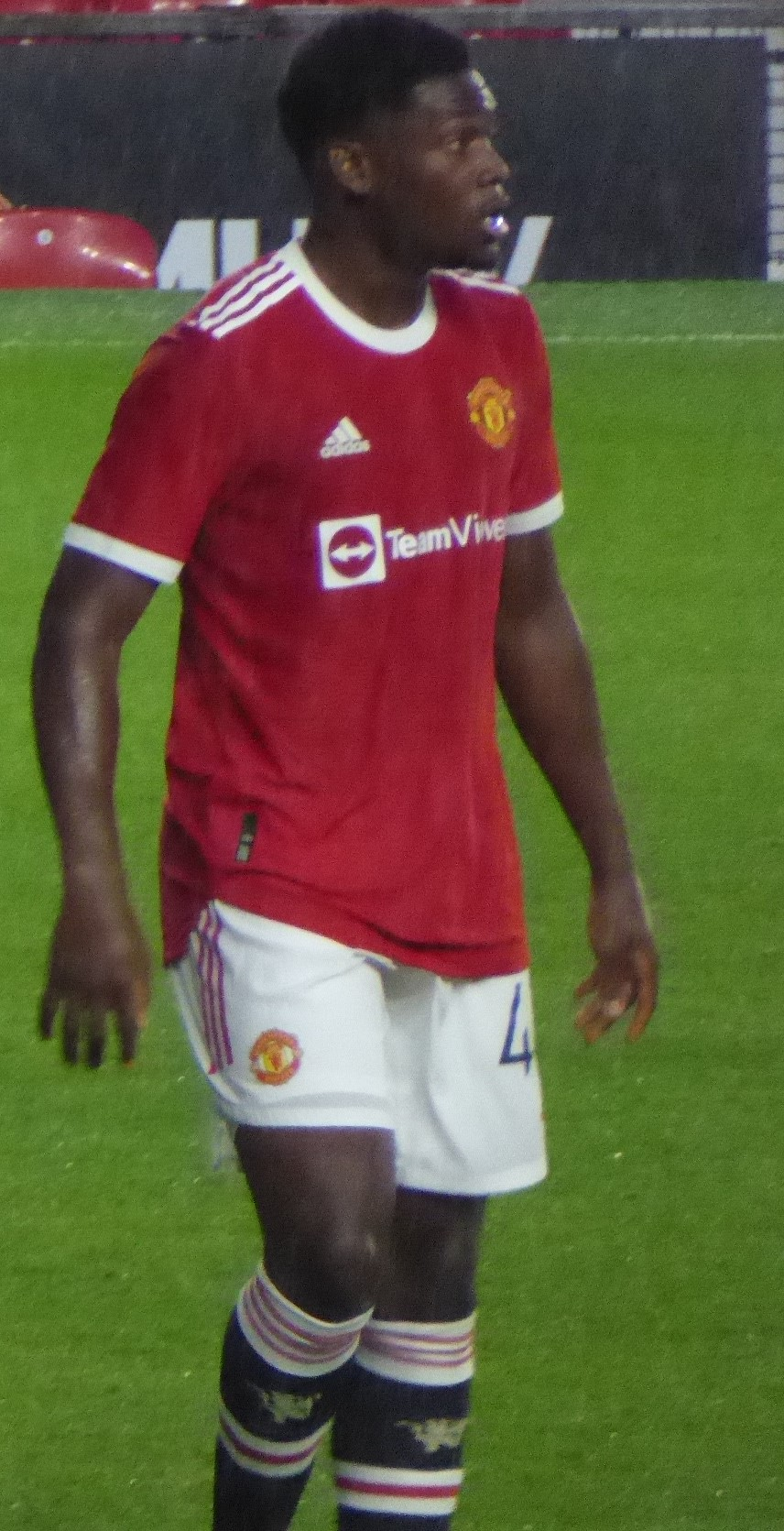
Mengi with Manchester United in 2021.

Mengi joined the Manchester United youth system at the age of seven. He made his first appearance for the club in an under-18 Premier League match against Sunderland on 28 October 2017. He signed his first professional contract in September 2019. He played three games for the under-21s in the 2019–20 EFL Trophy, making his debut against Lincoln City on 1 October. Soon after, he was an unused substitute for the United senior team for the first time in a Europa League match against Astana on 28 November.

Mengi made his senior debut on 5 August 2020, coming on as an 84th-minute substitute for Timothy Fosu-Mensah in a UEFA Europa League match against LASK. Mengi was promoted to the first team on 17 September ahead of the 2020–21 season, but although he was included as a substitute for EFL Cup games and on an expanded bench in the UEFA Champions League, he did not appear again for the first team in 2020.

==== Loans to Derby County and Birmingham City ====
In February 2021, he was sent on loan to EFL Championship club Derby County, managed by former United captain Wayne Rooney, for the remainder of the 2020–21 season. In March, he signed a new contract with Manchester United until June 2024, with the option of another year. After suffering an injury in April, Mengi returned to United early from Derby. Mengi joined another Championship club, Birmingham City, in January 2022 on loan for the rest of the 2021–22 season. He impressed, but a recurring hamstring injury restricted him to just ten appearances.

=== Luton Town ===
On 31 August 2023, Mengi joined newly promoted Premier League club Luton Town for an undisclosed fee, signing a long-term contract. He scored the first goal of his senior career on 25 November to give Luton the lead against Crystal Palace; although Palace equalised immediately afterwards, Jacob Brown secured Luton's first home win of the Premier League season.

== International career ==
Mengi has represented England at under-15, under-16, under-17 and under-18 levels. He was a member of the under-17 squad at the 2019 UEFA European Under-17 Championship.

In October 2021, Mengi was called up to train with the England senior team. On 11 November, Mengi made his England U20 debut during a 2–0 defeat to Portugal in the 2021–22 Under 20 Elite League.

On 26 March 2024, Mengi made his England under-21 debut as a second-half substitute during a 7–0 win against Luxembourg in a 2025 European Under-21 Championship qualifier at the Toughsheet Community Stadium, Bolton.

== Personal life ==
Mengi was born in Manchester, England, and is of Angolan descent. He attended Wright Robinson College in Gorton, Manchester.

== Career statistics ==
As of match played 21 November 2026

Appearances and goals by club, season and competition
Club	Season	League			FA Cup		League Cup		Europe		Other		Total	
Club	Season	Division	Apps	Goals	Apps	Goals	Apps	Goals	Apps	Goals	Apps	Goals	Apps	Goals
Manchester United U21	2019–20	—	—		—		—		—		3 (Note: Appearance(s) in EFL Trophy)	0	3	0
Manchester United U21	2020–21	—	—		—		—		—		3	0	3	0
Manchester United U21	2021–22	—	—		—		—		—		1	0	1	0
Manchester United U21	2022–23	—	—		—		—		—		2	0	2	0
Manchester United U21	Total		0	0	0	0	0	0	0	0	9	0	9	0
Manchester United	2019–20	Premier League	0	0	0	0	0	0	1 (Note: Appearance in UEFA Europa League)	0	—		1	0
Manchester United	2020–21	Premier League	0	0	0	0	0	0	0	0	—		0	0
Manchester United	2021–22	Premier League	0	0	0	0	0	0	1 (Note: Appearance in UEFA Champions League)	0	—		1	0
Manchester United	2022–23	Premier League	0	0	0	0	0	0	0	0	—		0	0
Manchester United	Total		0	0	0	0	0	0	2	0	0	0	2	0
Derby County (loan)	2020–21	Championship	9	0	—		—		—		—		9	0
Birmingham City (loan)	2021–22	Championship	9	0	1	0	—		—		—		10	0
Luton Town	2023–24	Premier League	30	1	4	0	1	0	—		—		35	1
Luton Town	2024–25	Championship	20	1	0	0	0	0	—		—		20	1
Luton Town	2025–26	League One	21	0	2	1	0	0	—		2	0	25	1
Luton Town	2026–27	League One	1	0	0	0	0	0	—		1	0	2	0
Luton Town	Total		72	2	6	1	1	0	—		3	0	82	3
Career total			89	2	7	1	1	0	2	0	12	0	111	3
