= Tom Holmes (footballer) =

English footballer (born 2000)

Personal information
- Full name: Thomas Richard Holmes
- Date of birth: 12 March 2000 (age 26)
- Place of birth: Ealing, England
- Height: 1.91 m (6 ft 3 in)
- Position: Defender

Youth career
- 2008–2017: Reading

Senior career*
Years	Team	Apps	(Gls)
2017–2024	Reading	121	(1)
2019–2020	→ KSV Roeselare (loan)	11	(0)
2024–2026	Luton Town	19	(1)
2024	→ Reading (loan)	4	(0)
2025	→ Dender EH (loan)	2	(0)
2025–2026	→ Rotherham United (loan)	6	(0)
- * Club domestic league appearances and goals as of 21:23, 1 September 2026 (UTC)

Thomas Richard Holmes (born 12 March 2000) is an English professional footballer who last played as a defender for EFL League One club Luton Town. He is currently a free agent.

== Career ==
=== Reading ===
Born in Ealing, London and growing up in Reading, Holmes joined the academy at Reading at the age of 8, becoming a season ticket holder at the club from age 11.

In July 2017, Holmes signed his first professional deal with Reading, making his first team debut on 6 March 2018 in a 1–1 draw against Bolton Wanderers.

On 26 February 2019, Holmes signed a new contract with the club until the summer of 2022.

==== Loan to Roeselare ====
On 2 September 2019 Holmes moved to Belgian First Division B club Roeselare on loan for the 2019–20 season.

==== Return to Reading ====
On 5 December 2021, Holmes scored his first goal for Reading – a bicycle kick against Hull City.

On 17 June 2022, Holmes signed a new three-year contract with Reading. Four days later on 21 July, he was confirmed as Reading's vice-captain for the 2022–23 season, behind captain Andy Yiadom.

On 17 January 2024, Holmes signed for Premier League side Luton Town, returning to Reading on loan until the end of the 2023–24 season.

=== Luton Town ===
After his initial loan to Reading, Holmes joined Luton Town for the start of the 2024–25 season following the club's relegation to the Championship.

==== Dender EH loan ====
On 3 February 2025, Holmes joined Belgian Pro League club Dender EH on loan for the remainder of the 2024–25 season.

==== Rotherham United loan ====
On 1 September 2025, Holmes joined fellow League One side Rotherham United on a season-long loan deal. Five days later he made his debut in a 1–0 win over Exeter City but suffered a knee injury that was expected to keep him out for two months. He was recalled by Luton on 12 January 2026.

On 1 September 2026, Holmes' contract with Luton Town was terminated by mutual consent.

== Personal life ==
Born in England, Holmes is of Canadian descent through his grandmother.

In 2023, Holmes was studying a degree on a part-time basis.

== Career statistics ==
As of start of 2026–27 season

Appearances and goals by club, season and competition
Club	Season	League			National Cup (Note: Includes FA Cup, Belgian Cup)		League Cup (Note: Includes EFL Cup)		Other		Total	
Club	Season	Division	Apps	Goals	Apps	Goals	Apps	Goals	Apps	Goals	Apps	Goals
Reading U21	2017–18	—			—		—		3 (Note: Appearance(s) in EFL Trophy)	0	3	0
Reading	2017–18	Championship	1	0	0	0	0	0	—		1	0
Reading	2018–19	Championship	0	0	0	0	0	0	—		0	0
Reading	2019–20	Championship	0	0	0	0	0	0	—		0	0
Reading	2020–21	Championship	39	0	0	0	1	0	—		40	0
Reading	2021–22	Championship	32	1	1	0	1	0	—		34	1
Reading	2022–23	Championship	40	0	1	0	1	0	—		42	0
Reading	2023–24	League One	9	0	1	0	0	0	2	0	12	0
Reading	Total		121	1	3	0	3	0	2	0	129	1
KSV Roeselare (loan)	2019–20	Belgian First Division B	11	0	0	0	—		—		11	0
Luton Town	2023–24	Premier League	0	0	0	0	0	0	—		0	0
Luton Town	2024–25	Championship	18	1	1	0	1	0	—		20	1
Luton Town	2025–26	League One	1	0	0	0	1	0	0	0	2	0
Luton Town	Total		19	1	1	0	2	0	0	0	22	1
Reading (loan)	2023–24	League One	4	0	0	0	0	0	0	0	4	0
Dender EH (loan)	2024–25	Belgian Pro League	2	0	0	0	—		—		2	0
Rotherham United (loan)	2025–26	League One	6	0	0	0	0	0	1	0	7	0
Career total			163	2	5	0	5	0	6	0	178	2
