= 2023–24 Luton Town F.C. season =

English football club season

Luton Town
2023–24 season
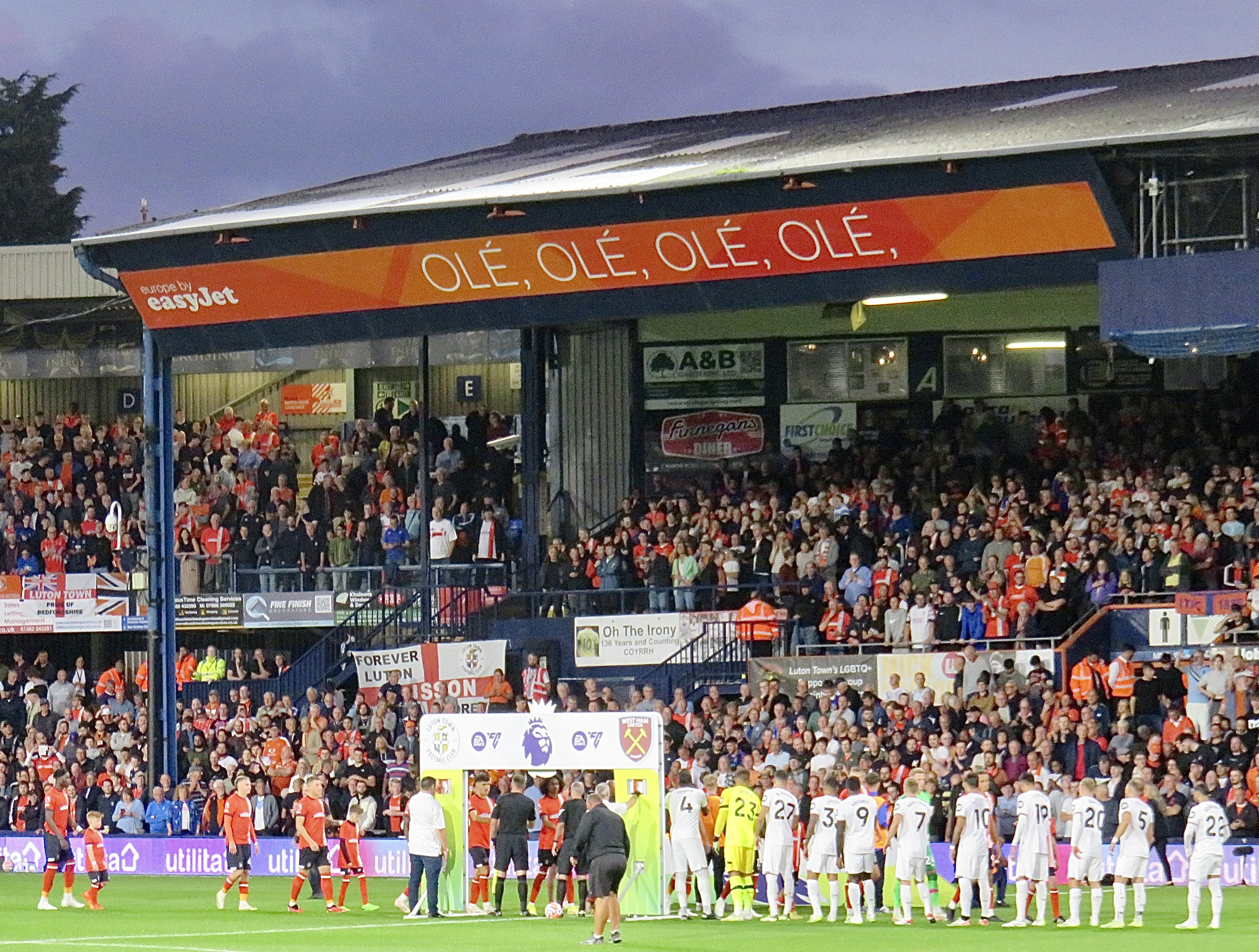
- Luton Town and West Ham United players shaking hands before a league match on 1 September 2023
- Owner: Luton Town Football Club 2020 Ltd
- Chairman: David Wilkinson
- Manager: Rob Edwards
- Stadium: Kenilworth Road
- Premier League: 18th (relegated)
- FA Cup: Fifth round
- EFL Cup: Third round
- Top goalscorer: League: Carlton Morris (11); All: Carlton Morris (11)
- Highest home attendance: 12,027 v Fulham (9 May 2024, Premier League)
- Lowest home attendance: 9,468 v Gillingham (29 Aug 2023, EFL Cup)
- Average home league attendance: 11,278
- Biggest win: 4–0 v Brighton & Hove Albion (Home, 30 Jan 2024, Premier League)
- Biggest defeat: 2–6 v Manchester City (Home, 27 Feb 2024, FA Cup); 5–1 v Manchester City (Away, 13 Apr 2024, Premier League); 1–5 v Brentford (Home, 20 Apr 2024, Premier League)
Home colours	Away colours	Third colours

The 2023–24 season was the 138th season in the history of Luton Town and their first ever season in the Premier League. It was the club's first return to the top flight of English football since the 1991–92 season. In addition to the domestic league, the club also participated in the FA Cup and the EFL Cup.

Luton were relegated from the Premier League on the final day of the season following a 4–2 home loss to Fulham, combined with results elsewhere.

== Squad ==
As of 18 March 2024

No.	Player	Position	Nationality	Place of birth	Date of birth (age)	Signed from	Date signed	Fee	Contract end
Goalkeepers
1	James Shea	GK	(England)	Islington	16 July 1991 (age 35)	AFC Wimbledon	3 July 2017	Undisclosed	30 June 2024
23	Tim Krul	GK	(Netherlands)	The Hague	3 April 1988 (age 38)	Norwich City	17 August 2023	Undisclosed	30 June 2024
24	Thomas Kaminski	GK	(Belgium)	Dendermonde	23 October 1992 (age 34)	Blackburn Rovers	3 August 2023	£2,500,000	30 June 2026
Defenders
2	Gabriel Osho	CB/DM	(England)	Reading	14 August 1998 (age 28)	Reading	18 November 2020	Free transfer	30 June 2024
3	Dan Potts	CB/LB	(England)	Barking	13 April 1994 (age 32)	West Ham United	29 May 2015	Free transfer	30 June 2024
4	Tom Lockyer	CB	(Wales)	Cardiff	3 December 1994 (age 31)	Charlton Athletic	1 September 2020	Undisclosed	30 June 2025
5	Mads Andersen	CB	(Denmark)	Albertslund	27 December 1997 (age 28)	Barnsley	3 July 2023	Undisclosed	30 June 2026
12	Issa Kaboré	RB	(Burkina Faso)	Bobo-Dioulasso	12 May 2001 (age 25)	Manchester City	21 July 2023	Loan	31 May 2024
15	Teden Mengi	CB	(England)	Manchester	30 April 2002 (age 24)	Manchester United	31 August 2023	Undisclosed	Unknown
16	Reece Burke	CB	(England)	Newham	2 September 1996 (age 30)	Hull City	1 July 2021	Free transfer	30 June 2025
27	Daiki Hashioka	RB	(Japan)	Saitama	17 May 1999 (age 27)	(Belgium) Sint-Truiden	30 January 2024	Undisclosed	30 June 2026
29	Amari'i Bell	CB/LB	(Jamaica)	(England) Burton upon Trent	5 May 1994 (age 32)	Blackburn Rovers	1 July 2021	Free transfer	30 June 2024
38	Joe Johnson	LB	(England)	Barnet	9 January 2006 (age 20)	Academy	9 August 2023	—N/a	30 June 2024
45	Alfie Doughty	LB/LWB	(England)	Poplar	21 December 1999 (age 26)	Stoke City	20 June 2022	Undisclosed	30 June 2024
Midfielders
6	Ross Barkley	CM	(England)	Liverpool	5 December 1993 (age 32)	(France) Nice	9 August 2023	Free Transfer	30 June 2024
8	Luke Berry	CM	(England)	Cambridge	12 July 1992 (age 34)	Cambridge United	25 August 2017	Undisclosed	30 June 2024
13	Marvelous Nakamba	DM	(Zimbabwe)	Hwange	19 January 1994 (age 32)	Aston Villa	20 July 2023	Undisclosed	30 June 2026
17	Pelly Ruddock Mpanzu	DM	(Democratic Republic of the Congo)	(England) Hendon	22 March 1994 (age 32)	West Ham United	28 January 2014	Undisclosed	30 June 2025
18	Jordan Clark	CAM/RW	(England)	Hoyland	22 September 1993 (age 33)	Accrington Stanley	5 August 2020	Free transfer	30 June 2024
28	Albert Sambi Lokonga	CM	(Belgium)	Verviers	22 October 1999 (age 27)	Arsenal	1 September 2023	Loan	31 May 2024
32	Fred Onyedinma	AM	(Nigeria)	Lagos	24 November 1996 (age 29)	Wycombe Wanderers	25 May 2021	Undisclosed	30 June 2024
43	Zack Nelson	CM	(England)	Enfield	21 May 2005 (age 21)	Academy	21 January 2023	—N/a	30 June 2025
—	Axel Piesold	CM	(England)	(England) Muswell Hill	9 November 2000 (age 26)	Free agent	24 September 2021	—N/a	30 June 2024
Forwards
7	Chiedozie Ogbene	RW	(Republic of Ireland)	(Nigeria) Lagos	1 May 1997 (age 29)	Rotherham United	1 July 2023	Free transfer	30 June 2025
9	Carlton Morris	CF	(England)	Cambridge	16 December 1995 (age 30)	Barnsley	1 July 2022	Undisclosed	30 June 2026
10	Cauley Woodrow	CF	(England)	Hemel Hempstead	2 December 1994 (age 31)	Barnsley	6 July 2022	£1,700,000	30 June 2026
11	Elijah Adebayo	CF	(England)	Brent	7 January 1998 (age 28)	Walsall	1 February 2021	Undisclosed	30 June 2024
14	Tahith Chong	RW	(Netherlands)	(Curaçao) Willemstad	4 December 1999 (age 26)	Birmingham City	13 July 2023	Undisclosed	30 June 2026
19	Jacob Brown	CF	(Scotland)	(England) Halifax	10 April 1998 (age 28)	Stoke City	10 August 2023	Undisclosed	30 June 2026
30	Andros Townsend	RW	(England)	Leytonstone	16 July 1991 (age 35)	Free agent	11 October 2023	Free transfer	30 June 2026
Out on Loan
15	Admiral Muskwe	CF	(Zimbabwe)	Harare	21 August 1998 (age 28)	Leicester City	15 July 2021	Undisclosed	30 June 2024
20	Louie Watson	CM	(Republic of Ireland)	(England) Croydon	7 July 2001 (age 25)	Derby County	1 July 2022	Undisclosed	30 June 2024
21	John McAtee	CF	(England)	Salford	23 July 1999 (age 27)	Grimsby Town	2 August 2022	Undisclosed	30 June 2024
22	Allan Campbell	CM	(Scotland)	Glasgow	4 July 1998 (age 28)	(Scotland) Motherwell	15 June 2021	Undisclosed	30 June 2024
25	Joe Taylor	CF	(England)	Peterborough	18 November 2002 (age 23)	Peterborough United	31 January 2022	Undisclosed	30 June 2024
26	Ryan Giles	LB	(England)	Telford	26 January 2000 (age 26)	Wolverhampton Wanderers	28 July 2023	Undisclosed	30 June 2026
40	Aidan Francis-Clarke	CM	(England)		2 July 2004 (age 22)	Academy	1 July 2022	—N/a	30 June 2025
—	Tom Holmes	CB	(England)	Reading	12 March 2000 (age 26)	Reading	17 January 2024	Undisclosed	30 June 2027
—	Aribim Pepple	CF	(Canada)	(England) Kettering	25 December 2002 (age 23)	(Canada) Cavalry	2 August 2022	Undisclosed	30 June 2024
—	Dion Pereira	LW	(Antigua and Barbuda)	(England) Watford	25 March 1999 (age 27)	Free agent	3 November 2020	—N/a	30 June 2024
—	Jack Walton	GK	(England)	Bury	23 April 1998 (age 28)	Barnsley	30 January 2023	Undisclosed	30 June 2024

== Transfers ==
=== In ===
Date	Pos.	Player	Transferred from	Fee	Ref.
1 July 2023	RW	(Republic of Ireland) Chiedozie Ogbene	(England) Rotherham United	Free transfer	
3 July 2023	CB	(Denmark) Mads Andersen	(England) Barnsley	Undisclosed	
14 July 2023	RW	(Netherlands) Tahith Chong	(England) Birmingham City	Undisclosed	
20 July 2023	DM	(Zimbabwe) Marvelous Nakamba	(England) Aston Villa	Undisclosed	
28 July 2023	LB	(England) Ryan Giles	(England) Wolverhampton Wanderers	Undisclosed	
3 August 2023	GK	(Belgium) Thomas Kaminski	(England) Blackburn Rovers	Undisclosed	
9 August 2023	MF	(England) Ross Barkley	(France) Nice	Free transfer	
10 August 2023	CF	(Scotland) Jacob Brown	(England) Stoke City	Undisclosed	
17 August 2023	GK	(Netherlands) Tim Krul	(England) Norwich City	Undisclosed	
31 August 2023	CB	(England) Teden Mengi	(England) Manchester United	Undisclosed	
11 October 2023	RW	(England) Andros Townsend	Free agent (previously (England) Everton)	Free transfer	
17 January 2024	CB	(England) Tom Holmes	(England) Reading	Undisclosed	
30 January 2024	RB	(Japan) Daiki Hashioka	(Belgium) Sint-Truiden	Undisclosed	
1 February 2024	GK	(Australia) Henry Blackledge	(Australia) Brisbane Roar	Undisclosed	
1 February 2024	GK	(Wales) Oliver Camis	Free agent	—N/a	
1 February 2024	CF	(England) Taylan Harris	(England) Reading	Undisclosed	

=== Out ===
Date	Pos.	Player	Transferred to	Fee	Ref.
30 June 2023	CB	(England) Sonny Bradley	(England) Derby County	End of contract	
30 June 2023	GK	(England) Harry Isted	(England) Charlton Athletic	Released	
30 June 2023	RB	(England) Avan Jones	(England) Chesham United	Released	
30 June 2023	CM	(England) Henri Lansbury	Retired	Released	
30 June 2023	DM	(England) Conor Lawless	(England) Dagenham & Redbridge	Released	
30 June 2023	RW	(England) Josh Neufville	(England) AFC Wimbledon	Released	
30 June 2023	CM	(England) Callum Nicolson	(England) AFC Dunstable	Released	
30 June 2023	DM	(England) Casey Pettit	(England) Maidenhead United	Released	
30 June 2023	LB	(Wales) Josh Williams	(England) Hemel Hempstead	Released	
24 July 2023	RW	(Guinea-Bissau) Carlos Mendes Gomes	(England) Bolton Wanderers	Undisclosed	
24 August 2023	AM	(England) Luke Freeman	(England) Barnet	Mutual consent	
2 September 2023	GK	(England) Matt Macey	(England) Portsmouth	Mutual Consent	
2 September 2023	DM	(England) Glen Rea	(England) Worthing	Mutual consent	
1 February 2024	DM	(England) Tyrelle Newton		Mutual consent	

=== Loaned in ===
Date	Pos.	Player	Loaned from	Until	Ref.
21 July 2023	RB	(Burkina Faso) Issa Kaboré	(England) Manchester City	End of season	
1 September 2023	CM	(Belgium) Albert Sambi Lokonga	(England) Arsenal	End of season	

=== Loaned out ===
Date	Pos.	Player	Loaned to	Date until	Ref.
10 July 2023	GK	(England) Jack Walton	(Scotland) Dundee United	End of season	
12 July 2023	CM	(Wales) Elliot Thorpe	(England) Shrewsbury Town	8 January 2024 (Note: On 8 January, Thorpe was recalled back early from his season-long loan at Shrewsbury.)	
26 July 2023	AM	(Nigeria) Fred Onyedinma	(England) Rotherham United	10 January 2024 (Note: On 10 January, Onyedinma returned back early from his season-long loan at Rotherham.)	
30 July 2023	CB	(England) Ben Tompkins	(England) Braintree Town	End of season (Note: On 8 January, Tompkins' loan at Braintree was extended until the end of season.)	
5 August 2023	CF	(Wales) Joe Taylor	(England) Colchester United	8 January 2024 (Note: On 8 January, Taylor was recalled back early from his season-long loan at Colchester.)	
18 August 2023	CF	(Canada) Aribim Pepple	(England) Bromley	8 January 2024 (Note: On 8 January, Pepple was recalled back early from his season-long loan at Bromley.)	
23 August 2023	CF	(England) Tobias Braney	(England) Bishop's Stortford	1 January 2024	
24 August 2023	SS	(England) John McAtee	(England) Barnsley	End of season	
25 August 2023	CF	(England) Josh Allen	(England) Chesham United	1 January 2024	
1 September 2023	CM	(Scotland) Allan Campbell	(England) Millwall	End of season	
1 September 2023	CF	(Zimbabwe) Admiral Muskwe	(England) Exeter City	End of season	
1 September 2023	LW	(Antigua and Barbuda) Dion Pereira	(England) Sutton United	9 January 2024 (Note: On 9 January, Pereira was recalled back early from his season-long loan at Sutton.)	
1 September 2023	CM	(Republic of Ireland) Louie Watson	(England) Charlton Athletic	End of season	
2 September 2023	CB	(England) Aidan Francis-Clarke	(England) Dagenham & Redbridge	End of season	
2 January 2024	GK	(England) Jameson Horlick	(England) Dorchester Town	End of season	
8 January 2024	CF	(England) Tobias Braney	(England) Hayes & Yeading United	End of season	
9 January 2024	CF	(Wales) Joe Taylor	(England) Lincoln City	End of season	
16 January 2024	CM	(England) Jayden Luker	(England) Woking	End of season	
17 January 2024	CB	(England) Tom Holmes	(England) Reading	End of season	
18 January 2024	CM	(England) Millar Matthews-Lewis	(England) Farnborough	End of season	
27 January 2024	LW	(Antigua and Barbuda) Dion Pereira	(England) Dagenham & Redbridge	End of season	
30 January 2024	LB	(England) Ryan Giles	(England) Hull City	End of season	
1 February 2024	CF	(England) Josh Allen	(England) AFC Sudbury	End of season	
1 February 2024	CM	(England) Jake Burger	(England) St Albans City	End of season	
1 February 2024	CF	(Canada) Aribim Pepple	(Scotland) Inverness Caledonian Thistle	End of season	
1 February 2024	CB	(England) Jacob Pinnington	(England) AFC Sudbury	End of season	
5 February 2024	CB	(England) Jack Bateson	(England) Hitchin Town	End of season	
5 February 2024	CF	(England) Oliver Lynch	(England) Hitchin Town	End of season	

== Pre-season and friendlies ==
On 4 July, the Hatters announced their first pre-season friendly, against Ipswich Town. Three days later, a second was added, against Sheffield Wednesday. A third was added, against Wolverhampton Wanderers. The club's final friendly was confirmed to be against VfL Bochum in a double-header.

Win Draw Loss Fixtures

14 July 2023 Friendly	Luton Town	3–1	Peterborough United	Burton upon Trent
14:00 BST	Morris 28'; McAtee 68' Pereira 70'	Report	Clarke-Harris 65'	Stadium: St George's Park National Football Centre; Attendance: 0 (behind closed doors)

25 July 2023 Friendly	Ipswich Town	1–1	Luton Town	Colchester
19:30 BST	Burns 14'	Report	Morris 75' (pen.)	Stadium: JobServe Community Stadium

29 July 2023 Friendly	Sheffield Wednesday	1–2	Luton Town	Sheffield
15:00 BST	Smith 8' (pen.)	Report	Mpanzu 23'; Morris 82'	Stadium: Hillsborough Stadium

2 August 2023 Friendly	Wolverhampton Wanderers	0–0	Luton Town	Wolverhampton
19:30 BST		Report		Stadium: Molineux Stadium

5 August 2023 Friendly	VfL Bochum	2–1	Luton Town	Bochum, Germany
13:30 CEST; 12:30 BST	Stöger 9'; Asano 51'	Report	Lockyer 38'	Stadium: Vonovia Ruhrstadion

5 August 2023 Friendly	VfL Bochum	1–3	Luton Town	Bochum, Germany
15:15 CEST; 16:15 BST	Bero 17'	Report	Berry 14', 76'; Adebayo 70'	Stadium: Vonovia Ruhrstadion

== Competitions ==
=== Overall record ===
Competition	First match	Last match	Starting round	Final position	Record							
Competition	First match	Last match	Starting round	Final position	Pld	W	D	L	GF	GA	GD	Win %
Premier League	12 August 2023	19 May 2024	Matchday 1	18th	38	6	8	24	52	85	−33	15.79
FA Cup	7 January 2024	27 February 2024	Third round	Fifth round	4	2	1	1	6	7	−1	50.00
EFL Cup	29 August 2023	26 September 2023	Second round	Third round	2	1	0	1	3	3	+0	50.00
Total					44	9	9	26	61	95	−34	20.45

Source: Soccerway

=== Premier League ===
==== League table ====
Pos	Team	Pld	W	D	L	GF	GA	GD	Pts	Qualification or relegation
16	Brentford	38	10	9	19	56	65	−9	39	
17	Nottingham Forest	38	9	9	20	49	67	−18	32 (Note: Nottingham Forest were deducted four points for breaching profitability and sustainability rules. The club appealed the decision but were unsuccessful.)	
18	Luton Town (R)	38	6	8	24	52	85	−33	26	Relegation to EFL Championship
19	Burnley (R)	38	5	9	24	41	78	−37	24	Relegation to EFL Championship
20	Sheffield United (R)	38	3	7	28	35	104	−69	16	Relegation to EFL Championship

Source: Premier League
Rules for classification: 1) Points; 2) Goal difference; 3) Goals scored; 4) If the champions, relegated teams or qualified teams for UEFA competitions cannot be determined by rules 1 to 3, rules 4.1 to 4.3 are applied – 4.1) Points gained in head-to-head record between such teams; 4.2) Away goals scored in head-to-head record between such teams; 4.3) Play-offs
(R) Relegated

==== Results summary ====
Overall								Home						Away					
Pld	W	D	L	GF	GA	GD	Pts	W	D	L	GF	GA	GD	W	D	L	GF	GA	GD
38	6	8	24	52	85	−33	26	4	4	11	28	37	−9	2	4	13	24	48	−24

Source: Soccerway

==== Results by round ====
Round	1	3	4	5	6	7	2^{1}	8	9	10	11	12	13	14	15	16	17	18	19	20	21	22	23	24	25	26^{3}	27	28	17^{4}	29	30	31	32	33	34	35	36	37	38
Ground	A	A	H	A	H	A	H	H	A	A	H	A	H	A	H	H	A	H	A	H	A	H	A	H	H	A	H	A	A	H	A	A	H	A	H	A	H	A	H
Result	L	L	L	L	D	W	L	L	D	L	D	L	W	L	L	L	V	W	W	L	D	W	D	L	L	L	L	D	L	D	L	L	W	L	L	L	D	L	L
Position	18	19	19	20	18	17	17	17	17	18	17	17^{2}	17	17	18	18	—	18	18	18	18	17	17	17	18	18	18	18	18	17^{5}	18	18	18	18	18	18	18	18	18
Points	0	0	0	0	1	4	4	4	5	5	6	6	9	9	9	9	—	12	15	15	16	19	20	20	20	20	20	21	21	22	22	22	25	25	25	25	26	26	26

Source: Soccerway
A = Away; H = Home; W = Win; D = Draw; L = Loss; V = Void
Notes:
- ^{1} Matchday 2 (vs Burnley) was postponed due to renovation works at Kenilworth Road.
- ^{2} Luton Town were originally 18th at the end of Matchday 12. On 17 November 2023, Everton were deducted 10 points, subsequently bringing Luton Town up to 17th.
- ^{3} Matchday 26 (vs Liverpool) was postponed due to Liverpool's EFL Cup final involvement.
- ^{4} Matchday 17 (vs Bournemouth) was rescheduled and replayed in full due to a Tom Lockyer cardiac arrest which happened during the original match.
- ^{5} Luton Town were originally 18th at the end of Matchday 29. On 18 March 2024, Nottingham Forest were deducted 4 points, subsequently bringing Luton Town up to 17th.

==== Matches ====
On 15 June, the Premier League fixtures were released.

Win Draw Loss Fixtures

12 August 2023 1	Brighton & Hove Albion	4–1	Luton Town	Brighton and Hove
15:00 BST	Estupiñán (yellow card) 7'; March 36'; Mitoma (yellow card) 43'; João Pedro 71' (pen.); Adingra 85'; Ferguson 90+5'	Report	Andersen (yellow card) 51'; Kaboré (yellow card) 59'; Morris 81' (pen.)	Stadium: Falmer Stadium; Attendance: 31,672; Referee: David Coote

25 August 2023 3	Chelsea	3–0	Luton Town	Fulham
20:00 BST	Sterling 17', 68'; Fernández (yellow card) 73'; Jackson 75'; Maatsen (yellow card) 90'	Report	Lockyer (yellow card) 27'; Nakamba (yellow card) 30'; Brown (yellow card) 78'	Stadium: Stamford Bridge; Attendance: 39,893; Referee: Robert Jones
Note: Live on Sky Sports

1 September 2023 4	Luton Town	1–2	West Ham United	Luton
20:00 BST	Nakamba (yellow card) 87'; Andersen 90+2'	Report	Bowen 37'; Emerson (yellow card) 81'; Zouma 85'	Stadium: Kenilworth Road; Attendance: 10,802; Referee: Paul Tierney

16 September 2023 5	Fulham	1–0	Luton Town	Fulham
15:00 BST	Castagne (yellow card) 40'; Diop (yellow card) 44'; Carlos Vinícius 65'	Report	Chong (yellow card) 27'; Kaminski (yellow card) 37'	Stadium: Craven Cottage; Attendance: 24,467; Referee: Michael Salisbury

23 September 2023 6	Luton Town	1–1	Wolverhampton Wanderers	Luton
15:00 BST	Morris 65' (pen.)	Report	Bellegarde (red card) 39'; João Gomes (yellow card) 45+1'; Neto 50'; Lemina (yellow card) 90+6'	Stadium: Kenilworth Road; Attendance: 10,893; Referee: Josh Smith

30 September 2023 7	Everton	1–2	Luton Town	Liverpool
15:00 BST	Calvert-Lewin 41'	Report	Lockyer 24'; Morris 31'; Kaboré (yellow card) 66'	Stadium: Goodison Park; Attendance: 39,289; Referee: Anthony Taylor

3 October 2023 2	Luton Town	1–2	Burnley	Luton
19:30 BST	Brown (yellow card) 36'; Burke (yellow card) 59'; Adebayo 84'; Chong (yellow card) 90+2'; Nakamba (yellow card) 90+3'	Report	Foster 45+2'; Roberts (yellow card) 66'; Bruun Larsen 85'; Taylor (yellow card) 90+4'	Stadium: Kenilworth Road; Attendance: 10,918; Referee: Peter Bankes
Note: Match, originally scheduled for 19 August 2023, but was postponed due to ground improvements works in relation to Premier League broadcast and media requirements.

7 October 2023 8	Luton Town	0–1	Tottenham Hotspur	Luton
12:30 BST	Lockyer (yellow card) 19'; Morris (yellow card) 34'	Report	Bissouma (yellow card) 38' (yellow-red card) 45+4'; Van de Ven 52'; Højbjerg (yellow card) 68'	Stadium: Kenilworth Road; Attendance: 10,929; Referee: John Brooks

21 October 2023 9	Nottingham Forest	2–2	Luton Town	West Bridgford
15:00 BST	Wood 48', 76'; Sangaré (yellow card) 60'; Gibbs-White (yellow card) 82'; Murillo (yellow card) 90+8'	Report	Ogbene 83'; Adebayo 90+2'	Stadium: City Ground; Attendance: 29,361; Referee: Craig Pawson

29 October 2023 10	Aston Villa	3–1	Luton Town	Birmingham
14:00 GMT	McGinn 17'; Zaniolo (yellow card) 28'; Diaby 49'; Cash (yellow card) 51'; Lockyer 62' (o.g.); Kamara (yellow card) 71'	Report	Kaboré (yellow card) 53'; Doughty (yellow card) 75'; Martínez 83' (o.g.)	Stadium: Villa Park; Attendance: 41,785; Referee: John Brooks

5 November 2023 11	Luton Town	1–1	Liverpool	Luton
16:30 GMT	Nakamba (yellow card) 44'; Chong 80'	Report	Mac Allister (yellow card) 54'; Díaz 90+5'	Stadium: Kenilworth Road; Attendance: 11,049; Referee: Andrew Madley

11 November 2023 12	Manchester United	1–0	Luton Town	Trafford
15:00 GMT	Lindelöf 59'	Report	Kaboré (yellow card) 74'; Lockyer (yellow card) 90+3'	Stadium: Old Trafford; Attendance: 73,599; Referee: Graham Scott

25 November 2023 13	Luton Town	2–1	Crystal Palace	Luton
15:00 GMT	Lockyer (yellow card) 44'; Osho (yellow card) 50'; Barkley (yellow card) 59'; Clark (yellow card) 69'; Mengi 72'; Brown 83'; Adebayo (yellow card) 90+1'; Kaminski (yellow card) 90+10'	Report	Lerma (yellow card) 13'; Olise 74'	Stadium: Kenilworth Road; Attendance: 11,029; Referee: Jarred Gillett

2 December 2023 14	Brentford	3–1	Luton Town	Brentford
15:00 GMT	Maupay 49'; Mee 56'; Baptiste 81'; Nørgaard (yellow card) 81'	Report	Kaminski (yellow card) 38'; Chong (yellow card) 50'; Brown 76'	Stadium: Brentford Community Stadium; Attendance: 17,075; Referee: Anthony Taylor

5 December 2023 15	Luton Town	3–4	Arsenal	Luton
20:15 GMT	Osho 25'; Brown (yellow card) 33'; Barkley (yellow card) 44', (goal) 57'; Adebayo 49'	Report	Martinelli 20'; Gabriel Jesus 45', (yellow card) 45+1'; Havertz 60'; Rice 90+7'	Stadium: Kenilworth Road; Attendance: 11,112; Referee: Sam Barrott

10 December 2023 16	Luton Town	1–2	Manchester City	Luton
14:00 GMT	Adebayo 45+2'; Nakamba (yellow card) 58'; Doughty (yellow card) 77'	Report	Silva 62'; Grealish 65'; Rodri (yellow card) 73'	Stadium: Kenilworth Road; Attendance: 11,047; Referee: Tim Robinson

23 December 2023 18	Luton Town	1–0	Newcastle United	Luton
15:00 GMT	Townsend 25'; Barkley (yellow card) 56'; Mengi (yellow card) 89'	Report	Hall (yellow card) 90+4'	Stadium: Kenilworth Road; Attendance: 11,042; Referee: Darren England

26 December 2023 19	Sheffield United	2–3	Luton Town	Sheffield
15:00 GMT	Ahmedhodžić (yellow card) 14', (goal) 69'; Hamer (yellow card) 41'; McBurnie 61'; Baldock (yellow card) 78'; Robinson (yellow card) 79'; Norwood (yellow card) 90+4'	Report	Doughty 17'; Robinson 77' (o.g.); Ben Slimane 81' (o.g.)	Stadium: Bramall Lane; Attendance: 31,041; Referee: Sam Allison

30 December 2023 20	Luton Town	2–3	Chelsea	Luton
12:30 GMT	Brown (yellow card) 27'; Mengi (yellow card) 77'; Barkley 80'; Adebayo 87'	Report	Palmer 12', 70'; Madueke 37'; Disasi (yellow card) 87'; Gusto (yellow card) 90+4'	Stadium: Kenilworth Road; Attendance: 11,041; Referee: Paul Tierney

12 January 2024 21	Burnley	1–1	Luton Town	Burnley
19:45 GMT	Amdouni 36'; Trafford (yellow card) 90+3'	Report	Morris 90+2'	Stadium: Turf Moor; Attendance: 20,155; Referee: Tony Harrington
Note: The match was originally scheduled for 15 January 2024, but was moved forward due to Luton's involvement in an FA Cup replay.

30 January 2024 22	Luton Town	4–0	Brighton & Hove Albion	Luton
19:45 GMT	Adebayo 1', 42', 56'; Ogbene 3'; Sambi Lokonga (yellow card) 25'; Clark (yellow card) 64'	Report	Igor (yellow card) 13'; Baleba (yellow card) 73'	Stadium: Kenilworth Road; Attendance: 10,994; Referee: Robert Jones

3 February 2024 23	Newcastle United	4–4	Luton Town	Newcastle upon Tyne
15:00 GMT	Longstaff 7', 23'; Burn (yellow card) 56'; Trippier 67'; Barnes 73'; Murphy (yellow card) 76'	Report	Osho 21', (yellow card) 90'; Barkley 40'; Morris 59' (pen.); Sambi Lokonga (yellow card) 60'; Adebayo 62'	Stadium: St James' Park; Attendance: 52,211; Referee: Thomas Bramall

10 February 2024 24	Luton Town	1–3	Sheffield United	Luton
15:00 GMT	Morris (yellow card) 41', (goal) 52' (pen.)	Report	Holgate (yellow card) 10'; Hamer (yellow card) 26'; Archer 30'; McAtee 36' (pen.); Vinícius 72'	Stadium: Kenilworth Road; Attendance: 11,138; Referee: Chris Kavanagh

18 February 2024 25	Luton Town	1–2	Manchester United	Luton
16:30 GMT	Morris 14'; Woodrow (yellow card) 17'; Townsend (yellow card) 70'; Osho (yellow card) 87'	Report	Højlund 1', 7'; Shaw (yellow card) 20'; Casemiro (yellow card) 34'; Maguire (yellow card) 42'; Mainoo (yellow card) 75'; Lindelöf (yellow card) 81'	Stadium: Kenilworth Road; Attendance: 11,483; Referee: David Coote

21 February 2024 26	Liverpool	4–1	Luton Town	Liverpool
19:30 GMT	Van Dijk 56'; Gakpo 58'; Díaz 71'; Gomez (yellow card) 82'; Elliott 90'	Report	Ogbene 12'; Doughty (yellow card) 18'; Woodrow (yellow card) 42'; Barkley (yellow card) 77'; Kaboré (yellow card) 89'	Stadium: Anfield; Attendance: 59,896; Referee: Andrew Madley
Note: The match was originally scheduled for 25 February 2024, but was brought forward due to Liverpool's involvement in the EFL Cup final.

2 March 2024 27	Luton Town	2–3	Aston Villa	Luton
17:30 GMT	Burke (yellow card) 38'; Chong 66'; Morris 72'	Report	Watkins 24', 38'; Douglas Luiz (yellow card) 45'; Bailey (yellow card) 45+5'; Rogers (yellow card) 50'; Digne 89'; Zaniolo (yellow card) 90+2'	Stadium: Kenilworth Road; Attendance: 11,594; Referee: Michael Oliver
Note: The match was originally scheduled to kick-off at 15:00, but was moved forward for live Sky Sports coverage.

9 March 2024 28	Crystal Palace	1–1	Luton Town	Selhurst
15:00 GMT	Mateta 11'; Eze (yellow card) 39'; Muñoz (yellow card) 86'	Report	Kaboré (yellow card) 27'; Burke (yellow card) 57'; Berry (yellow card) 90+1'; Woodrow 90+6'	Stadium: Selhurst Park; Attendance: 25,103; Referee: Sunny Singh Gill

13 March 2024 17	Bournemouth	4–3	Luton Town	Bournemouth
19:30 GMT	Solanke 50'; Zabarnyi 62'; Semenyo 64', 83'; Smith (yellow card) 69'	Report	Chong 9'; Clark (yellow card) 30'; Ogbene 31', (yellow card) 66'; Barkley 45+1'	Stadium: Dean Court; Attendance: 11,198; Referee: Sam Allison
Note: Match, originally scheduled for 16 December 2023, was abandoned and rescheduled to 13 March 2024 to be replayed in full due to a Tom Lockyer cardiac arrest which happened during the original match.

16 March 2024 29	Luton Town	1–1	Nottingham Forest	Luton
15:00 GMT	Kaboré (yellow card) 30'; Berry 89'	Report	Wood 34'; Toffolo (yellow card) 84'; Sels (yellow card) 90'	Stadium: Kenilworth Road; Attendance: 11,630; Referee: Darren England

30 March 2024 30	Tottenham Hotspur	2–1	Luton Town	Tottenham
15:00 GMT	Kaboré 51' (o.g.); Son Heung-min 86'; Højbjerg (yellow card) 90+5'; Lo Celso (yellow card) 90+6'	Report	Chong 3'; Barkley (yellow card) 31'; Burke (yellow card) 36'; Mpanzu (yellow card) 46'; Mengi (yellow card) 90'	Stadium: Tottenham Hotspur Stadium; Attendance: 61,534; Referee: Jarred Gillett

3 April 2024 31	Arsenal	2–0	Luton Town	Holloway
19:30 BST	Ødegaard 24'; Hashioka 44' (o.g.); Havertz (yellow card) 66'	Report	Onyedinma (yellow card) 74'	Stadium: Emirates Stadium; Attendance: 60,262; Referee: Craig Pawson

6 April 2024 32	Luton Town	2–1	Bournemouth	Luton
15:00 BST	Clark 73'; Morris 90'	Report	Tavernier 52'	Stadium: Kenilworth Road; Attendance: 11,797; Referee: Andrew Madley

13 April 2024 33	Manchester City	5–1	Luton Town	Manchester
15:00 BST	Hashioka 2' (o.g.); De Bruyne (yellow card) 43'; Kovačić 64'; Haaland 76' (pen.); Doku 87'; Gvardiol 90+3'	Report	Barkley 81'	Stadium: City of Manchester Stadium; Referee: John Brooks

20 April 2024 34	Luton Town	1–5	Brentford	Luton
15:00 BST	Doughty (yellow card) 88'; Berry 90+2'	Report	Wissa 24', 45+1'; Pinnock (yellow card) 38', (goal) 62'; Damsgaard (yellow card) 48'; Lewis-Potter 64'; Schade 86'	Stadium: Kenilworth Road; Attendance: 11,877; Referee: Jarred Gillett

27 April 2024 35	Wolverhampton Wanderers	2–1	Luton Town	Wolverhampton
15:00 BST	João Gomes (yellow card) 11'; Hwang Hee-chan 39', (yellow card) 81'; Toti 50'; Sarabia (yellow card) 90+5'	Report	Sambi Lokonga (yellow card) 58'; Morris 80'	Stadium: Molineux; Attendance: 31,512; Referee: David Coote

3 May 2024 36	Luton Town	1–1	Everton	Luton
20:00 BST	Adebayo 31'; Chong (yellow card) 43'	Report	Garner (yellow card) 9'; Calvert-Lewin 24' (pen.); Gueye (yellow card) 53'; Gomes (yellow card) 90+3'	Stadium: Kenilworth Road; Attendance: 11,873; Referee: Tim Robinson
Note: Fixture was initially scheduled for 4 May, but was moved for live Sky Sports broadcast.

11 May 2024 37	West Ham United	3–1	Luton Town	Stratford
15:00 BST	Emerson (yellow card) 52'; Ward-Prowse 54'; Souček 65'; Earthy 76'	Report	Sambi Lokonga 6'; Barkley (yellow card) 10'; Burke (yellow card) 79'; Morris (yellow card) 83'	Stadium: London Stadium; Referee: Michael Oliver

19 May 2024 38	Luton Town	2–4	Fulham	Luton
16:00 BST	Sambi Lokonga (yellow card) 34'; Morris 45+1' (pen.), (yellow card) 73'; Clark (yellow card) 48'; Doughty 55', (yellow card) 59'; Johnson (yellow card) 75'	Report	Reed (yellow card) 22'; Traoré 43', (yellow card) 73'; Jiménez 45+3', 49'; Robinson (yellow card) 54'; Wilson 69'; Cairney (yellow card) 88'	Stadium: Kenilworth Road; Attendance: 12,027; Referee: Matt Donohue

==== Abandoned match with Bournemouth ====
On 16 December 2023, during the match away against Bournemouth, Luton defender Tom Lockyer collapsed due to a cardiac arrest in the 59th minute of the match resulting in the match being abandoned in the 65th minute. On 20 December 2023, the Premier League ruled the match would be replayed in full at a later date. On 7 February 2024, it was announced that the rearranged fixture would take place on 13 March 2024.

16 December 2023 17	Bournemouth	1–1; Abandoned	Luton Town	Bournemouth
15:00 GMT	Solanke 58'	Report	Adebayo 3'; Doughty (yellow card) 12'	Stadium: Dean Court; Attendance: 11,185; Referee: Simon Hooper

=== FA Cup ===
As a Premier League side, Luton entered in the third round, and were drawn at home to EFL League One club Bolton Wanderers. In the fifth round, they were drawn at home to the holders, Manchester City.

Win Draw Loss Fixtures

7 January 2024 Third round	Luton Town	0–0	Bolton Wanderers	Luton
14:00 GMT	Clark (yellow card) 90+1'	Report		Stadium: Kenilworth Road; Attendance: 10,739; Referee: Andrew Madley

16 January 2024 Third round replay	Bolton Wanderers	1–2	Luton Town	Bolton
19:45 GMT	Charles 11'; Forrester (yellow card) 27'	Report	Chong 15'; Mengi (yellow card) 31'; Ogbene 57'; Clark (yellow card) 64'	Stadium: Toughsheet Community Stadium; Attendance: 10,878; Referee: Thomas Bramall

27 January 2024 Fourth round	Everton	1–2	Luton Town	Liverpool
15:00 GMT	Harrison 55'; Chermiti (yellow card) 90+1'	Report	Mykolenko 39' (o.g.); Burke (yellow card) 90+1'; Woodrow 90+6'	Stadium: Goodison Park; Attendance: 37,713; Referee: Simon Hooper

27 February 2024 Fifth round	Luton Town	2–6	Manchester City	Luton
20:00 GMT	Clark 45', 52'	Report	Haaland 3', 18', 40', 55', 58'; Kovačić 72'	Stadium: Kenilworth Road; Attendance: 11,163; Referee: Anthony Taylor

=== EFL Cup ===
Luton entered the competition in the second round, and were drawn at home to Gillingham. They were then drawn away to Exeter City in the third round.

Win Draw Loss Fixtures

29 August 2023 Second round	Luton Town	3–2	Gillingham	Luton
19:45 BST	Brown 2'; Doughty 28'; Berry (yellow card) 34'; Woodrow 66'	Report	Dieng (yellow card) 43'; Clarke 55'; Nichols 88'	Stadium: Kenilworth Road; Attendance: 9,468; Referee: Jeremy Simpson

26 September 2023 Third round	Exeter City	1–0	Luton Town	Exeter
19:45 BST	Mitchell (yellow card) 48' (yellow-red card) 88', (goal) 83'; Harper (yellow card) 51'; Sinisalo (yellow card) 78'; Sweeney (yellow card) 90+6'; Carroll (yellow card) 90+6'	Report	Mengi (yellow card) 35'; Chong (yellow card) 42'	Stadium: St James Park; Attendance: 7,360; Referee: James Bell

== Squad statistics ==
As of 18 March 2024

=== Appearances and goals ===
No.	Pos	Nat	Player	Total		Premier League		FA Cup		EFL Cup	
No.	Pos	Nat	Player	Apps	Goals	Apps	Goals	Apps	Goals	Apps	Goals
Goalkeepers
1	GK	(England) ENG	James Shea	1	0	1	0	0	0	0	0
23	GK	(Netherlands) NED	Tim Krul	6	0	0	0	4	0	2	0
24	GK	(Belgium) BEL	Thomas Kaminski	29	0	29	0	0	0	0	0
Defenders
2	DF	(England) ENG	Gabriel Osho	20	2	16	2	2	0	2	0
3	DF	(England) ENG	Dan Potts	0	0	0	0	0	0	0	0
4	DF	(Wales) WAL	Tom Lockyer	15	1	14	1	0	0	1	0
5	DF	(Denmark) DEN	Mads Andersen	10	1	8	1	0	0	2	0
12	DF	(Burkina Faso) BFA	Issa Kaboré	22	0	20	0	0	0	2	0
15	DF	(England) ENG	Teden Mengi	27	1	22	1	4	0	1	0
16	DF	(England) ENG	Reece Burke	18	0	14	0	3	0	1	0
27	DF	(Japan) JPN	Daiki Hashioka	4	0	3	0	1	0	0	0
29	DF	(Jamaica) JAM	Amari'i Bell	27	0	21	0	4	0	2	0
38	DF	(England) ENG	Joe Johnson	3	0	0	0	2	0	1	0
45	DF	(England) ENG	Alfie Doughty	34	3	28	2	4	0	2	1
Midfielders
6	MF	(England) ENG	Ross Barkley	29	5	24	5	4	0	1	0
8	MF	(England) ENG	Luke Berry	12	2	9	2	1	0	2	0
13	MF	(Zimbabwe) ZIM	Marvelous Nakamba	14	0	13	0	0	0	1	0
17	MF	(Democratic Republic of the Congo) COD	Pelly Ruddock Mpanzu	26	0	21	0	3	0	2	0
18	MF	(England) ENG	Jordan Clark	18	2	15	0	3	2	0	0
23	MF	(Nigeria) NGR	Fred Onyedinma	0	0	0	0	0	0	0	0
28	MF	(Belgium) BEL	Albert Sambi Lokonga	14	0	12	0	2	0	0	0
43	MF	(England) ENG	Zack Nelson	1	0	1	0	0	0	0	0
Forwards
7	FW	(Republic of Ireland) IRL	Chiedozie Ogbene	34	5	28	4	4	1	2	0
9	FW	(England) ENG	Carlton Morris	34	11	29	11	4	0	1	0
10	FW	(England) ENG	Cauley Woodrow	20	3	15	1	3	1	2	1
11	FW	(England) ENG	Elijah Adebayo	28	10	23	10	3	0	2	0
14	FW	(Netherlands) NED	Tahith Chong	29	5	24	4	4	1	1	0
19	FW	(Scotland) SCO	Jacob Brown	22	3	19	2	1	0	2	1
30	FW	(England) ENG	Andros Townsend	24	1	20	1	4	0	0	0
Players transferred out during the season
26	DF	(England) ENG	Ryan Giles	14	0	11	0	2	0	1	0
