= Ross Barkley =

English footballer (born 1993)

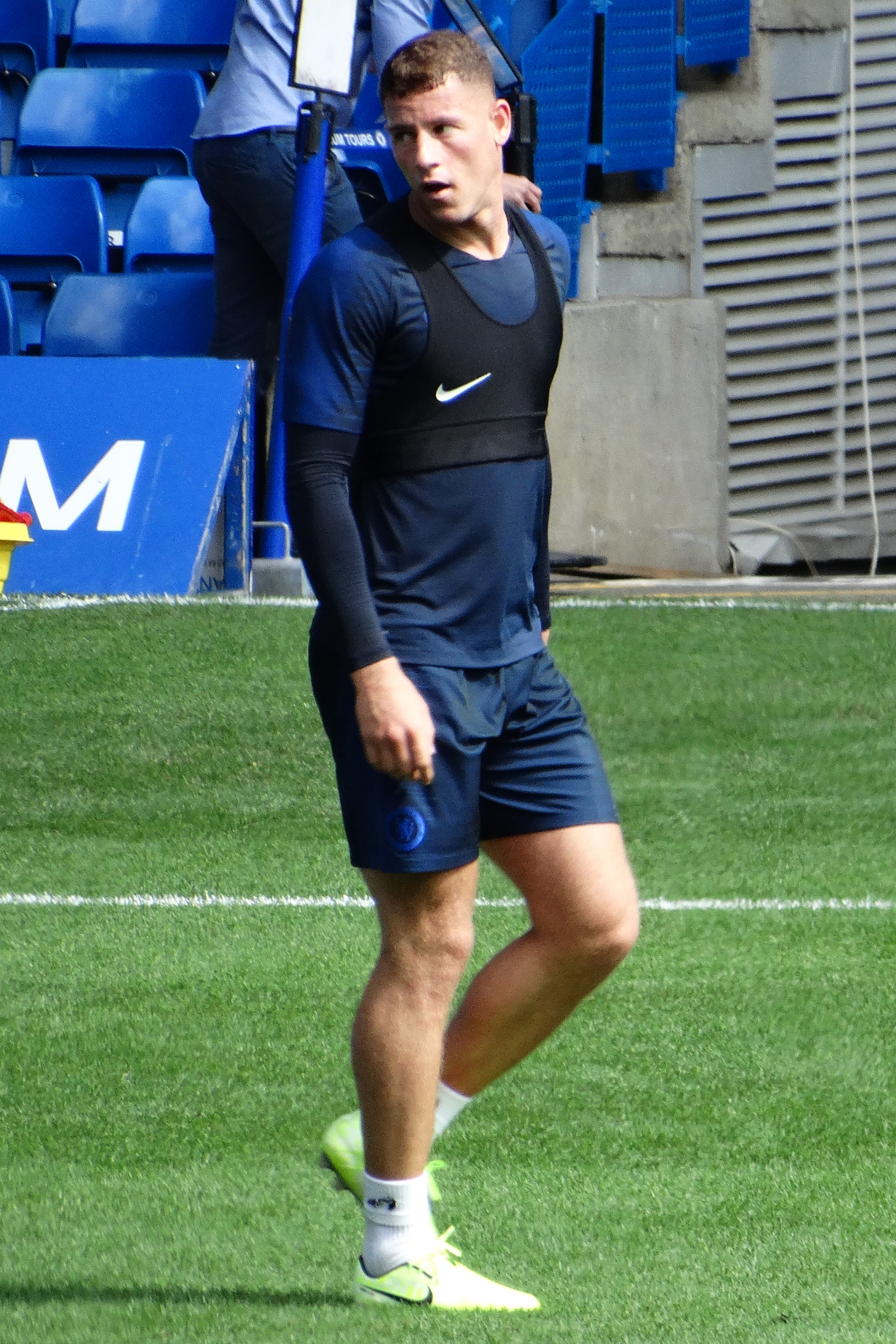
- Barkley training with Chelsea in 2019

Personal information
- Full name: Ross Barkley
- Date of birth: 5 December 1993 (age 32)
- Place of birth: Liverpool, England
- Height: 6 ft 2 in (1.89 m)
- Position: Midfielder

Team information
- Current team: Aston Villa
- Number: 6

Youth career
- 2005–2010: Everton

Senior career*
Years	Team	Apps	(Gls)
2010–2018	Everton	150	(21)
2012	→ Sheffield Wednesday (loan)	13	(4)
2013	→ Leeds United (loan)	4	(0)
2018–2022	Chelsea	58	(5)
2020–2021	→ Aston Villa (loan)	24	(3)
2022–2023	Nice	27	(4)
2023–2024	Luton Town	32	(5)
2024–	Aston Villa	52	(6)

International career
2008–2009	England U16	6	(2)
2009–2010	England U17	7	(2)
2010–2012	England U19	12	(0)
2013	England U20	3	(0)
2011–2013	England U21	5	(1)
2013–2019	England	33	(6)
Medal record
Men's football
Representing England
UEFA European Under-17 Championship
Winner	2010 Liechtenstein
UEFA Nations League
Third place	2019 Portugal
- * Club domestic league appearances and goals as of 21:10, 21 November 2026 (UTC)

Ross Barkley (born 5 December 1993) is an English professional footballer who plays as a midfielder for Premier League club Aston Villa.

Barkley began his professional career at Everton in 2010. After loan spells at Sheffield Wednesday and Leeds United he became a regular in their team, playing 179 total games and scoring 27 goals for Everton. He signed for Chelsea in 2018 and won the FA Cup in 2018, the UEFA Europa League in 2019 and the FIFA Club World Cup in 2021.

A former youth international across numerous levels, Barkley made his senior debut for the England national team in 2013. He played for England at the 2014 FIFA World Cup in Brazil, and was also selected in Roy Hodgson's 23-man squad for UEFA Euro 2016. During his time as an international, he earned 33 caps.

== Early life and career ==
Ross Barkley was born on 5 December 1993 in Liverpool, Merseyside. In 2005, he joined Everton as an 11-year-old and played for the club's youth teams. He was named as a substitute in a first team league match in early 2010–11, and was expected to make his Premier League debut before his leg was broken in one place after a collision with Liverpool's Andre Wisdom during an England under-19 match in October 2010.

== Club career ==
=== Everton ===
==== Early career ====
Barkley recovered from his injury in time to join the first team for pre-season training before the beginning of 2011–12. During pre-season, Tim Cahill heralded Barkley as the most talented footballer he had worked with. He made his debut in Everton's first home match of the season, a 1–0 defeat to Queens Park Rangers, and was named man of the match by Radio City Sport. His early performances were highly praised, with Martin Keown predicting that "[Barkley will] be one of the best players we'll ever see in this country." He signed a new four-and-a-half-year contract in December 2011.

On 14 September 2012, Barkley joined Sheffield Wednesday on a one-month loan, making his debut the same day in an away defeat against Brighton & Hove Albion. He scored his first goal for the club, a penalty, against Bolton Wanderers the following week. His loan was extended before he was recalled by Everton after playing 13 matches for Wednesday. He again went out on loan, this time to Leeds United for an "initial one-month stint", in January 2013 and made his debut for Leeds in a derby match against Barnsley.

==== 2013–2018 ====
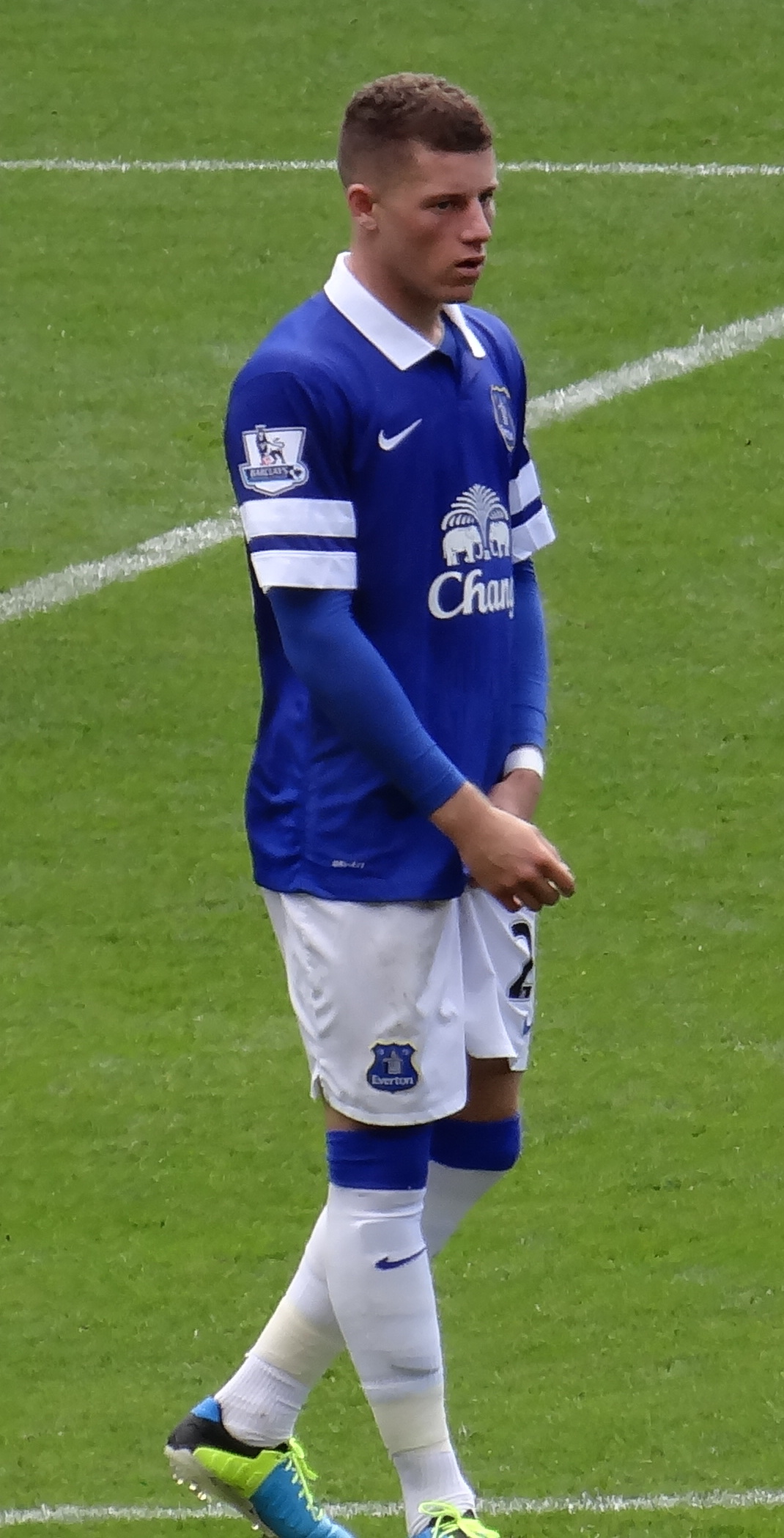
Barkley playing for Everton in 2013

Barkley re-joined the Everton first team for the 2013–14 season. He scored his first goal for the club on the opening day in a 2–2 draw against Norwich City, and was later named man of the match. During the first half of the season, Barkley put in several man-of-the-match performances, notably against Arsenal and Swansea City – the latter whom he scored the winner against. He received praise from pundits including Alan Hansen and Gary Lineker who said Barkley was a star in the making and a prodigious talent.

Barkley's first FA Cup goal came on 4 January 2014, opening a 4–0 win over Queens Park Rangers in the third round. In March, Barkley scored a superb solo goal against Newcastle United in which he ran from his own half to net the opener in a 3–0 victory. On 18 April 2014, he was named as one of the six players on the shortlist for the PFA Young Player of the Year award. He scored a total of 6 goals in 34 Premier League matches throughout the season, including a goal against Manchester City on 3 May which BBC Sport described as "spectacular" and was awarded goal of the season at Everton's end of year awards.

On 29 July 2014, Barkley signed a new contract with Everton, keeping him at the club until 2018. Before the start of the 2014–15 season he suffered an injury to his medial collateral ligament, and did not play until 18 October 2014, setting up Romelu Lukaku's goal in a 3–0 home league win over Aston Villa. He scored his first goal of the season in a 3–1 win over Queens Park Rangers on 15 December.

Barkley started the 2015–16 season with goals in Everton's first two league matches.

Barkley scored Everton's first goal of the 2016–17 season on the opening day of the season, netting in the fifth minute of a 1–1 home draw against Tottenham Hotspur. In May 2017, Everton manager Ronald Koeman issued an ultimatum to Barkley, stating that if he was not signing a new contract, despite being offered an extension by the club, he would be sold in the summer. Koeman said on 26 July that Barkley had told him that he was ready for a new challenge and that he would not be signing a new contract with the club.

Barkley did not feature for Everton in his final season with the club, having been sidelined with a long-term hamstring injury.

=== Chelsea ===
==== 2018–2019 ====
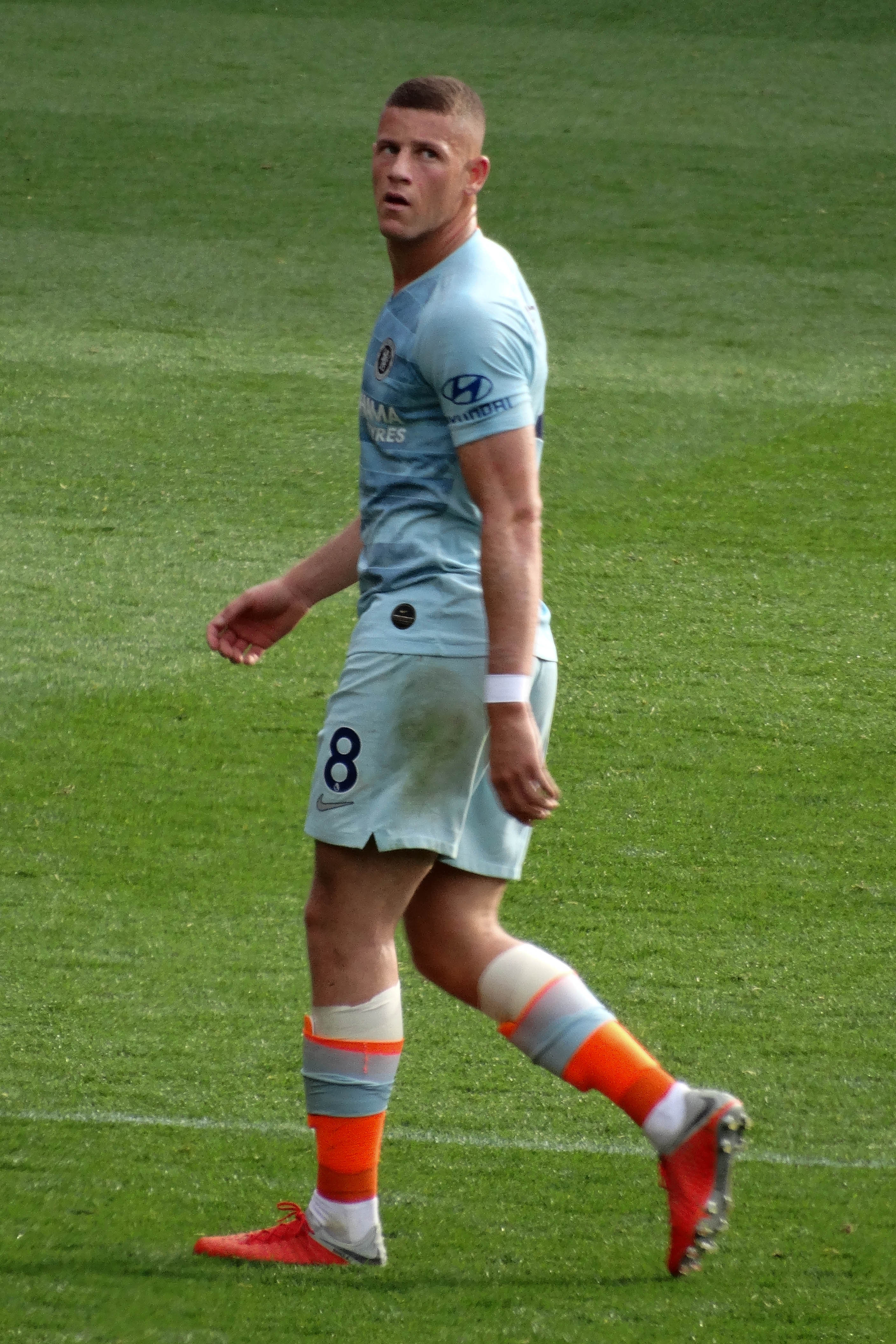
Barkley playing for Chelsea in 2018

On 5 January 2018, Barkley joined Premier League club Chelsea for a fee of £15 million, signing a five-and-a-half-year contract with the defending champions. He was assigned shirt number 8 by the club, the same number he wore at Everton. Barkley had been close to joining Chelsea previously on the summer transfer deadline day, before a move failed to materialise due to him suffering a long-term injury and wanting to consider his options. Days after its completion, the transfer was referred to Merseyside Police by the Mayor of Liverpool, Joe Anderson, to investigate the possibility of fraud in the transaction. No fraud was found.

Barkley made his Chelsea debut in a 2–1 defeat at Arsenal in the semi-final second leg of the EFL Cup on 24 January. He came on as a first-half substitute, replacing the injured Willian. Barkley made his Premier League debut for Chelsea in a 3–0 home loss to AFC Bournemouth. At the end of the season he was an unused substitute as Chelsea beat Manchester United in the 2018 FA Cup final.

On 7 October, Barkley scored his first goal for Chelsea in a 3–0 win away to Southampton in the Premier League after a strong start to the season under new manager Maurizio Sarri. He followed that up with a last minute equaliser at home to Manchester United on 20 October. On 28 October, he scored for the third game running against Burnley, in a 4–0 away win. On 15 February 2019, Barkley scored his first European goal as Chelsea beat Malmö 2–1 in their Europa League last 32 first leg tie. He scored again in his second successive Europa League game against Malmö six days later in the second-leg tie at home. On 29 May, Barkley appeared in Chelsea's 4–1 victory over Arsenal in the 2019 UEFA Europa League final, coming on as a substitute for Mateo Kovačić.

==== 2019–20 season ====
On 17 September 2019, Barkley missed a vital penalty in a home Champions League game against Valencia. The miss sparked controversy as moments prior had revealed Barkley stepped up to take the penalty without consulting teammates, particularly Jorginho and Willian, the club's two preferred penalty takers. Chelsea would eventually lose the match 0–1. After the game, manager Frank Lampard defended his actions, stating that Barkley was the club's designated penalty taker. Barkley scored his first goal of the season in a 7–1 win over Grimsby Town in the third round of the EFL Cup.

In November 2019, Barkley was pictured topless in a nightclub. As a result, he was left out of Chelsea's squad travelling to Valencia, and Lampard was critical of him. On 23 September 2020, Barkley scored his first goal of the season, the third in a 6–0 home win over Barnsley in the EFL Cup third round.

==== 2020–21 season: Loan to Aston Villa ====
On 30 September 2020, Barkley joined fellow Premier League side Aston Villa on a season-long loan. On 4 October, Barkley made his Villa debut, scoring one goal in a 7–2 home victory over Liverpool which was his club's biggest league win for 25 years, and followed this two weeks later with a late winner in a 1–0 away win over Leicester City to give Villa their best start to a season for 90 years.

==== 2021–22 season ====
Barkley returned to Chelsea for the 2021–22 season. He made his first appearance in a 2021–22 EFL Cup third-round match at home to Aston Villa on 22 September 2021, coming on as a substitute for Hakim Ziyech in the second half. On 2 October, Barkley made his first Premier League appearance of the season and played a crucial part in the build up that saw Timo Werner score his side's second goal, as Chelsea won 3–1 at home against Southampton.

On 22 May 2022, in the last league game of the season, Barkley marked his 100th appearance for Chelsea with the winning goal against Watford, which was also the final goal of the Roman Abramovich era. Barkley left Chelsea by mutual consent on 29 August.

=== Nice ===
Barkley signed for French Ligue 1 club Nice on 4 September 2022. On 10 June 2023, it was announced that Barkley would be leaving Nice in the summer, having made a total of 28 appearances and scoring four goals for the French club.

=== Luton Town ===
On 9 August 2023, Barkley joined newly-promoted Premier League club Luton Town on a free transfer. He made his debut in a 3–0 defeat away to Chelsea on 25 August. He scored his first goal for Luton in a 4–3 home loss to Arsenal on 5 December.

Despite relegation, Barkley was named Luton Town Player of the Season for the 2023–24 season.

=== Return to Aston Villa ===
On 1 July 2024, following Luton Town's relegation from Premier League, Aston Villa announced the return of Barkley on a permanent transfer, as he signed a three-year contract with the club; he joined for an undisclosed fee, reported to be £5 million.

Barkley briefly missed the start of the 2025–26 season at Aston Villa due to what manager Unai Emery described as a "personal issue". He returned to Aston Villa training in September 2025.

On 30 November 2025, Barkley suffered a knee injury 13 minutes after coming onto the pitch from the bench in a 1–0 victory over Wolverhampton Wanderers. The injury was expected to keep him sidelined for around two months.

== International career ==
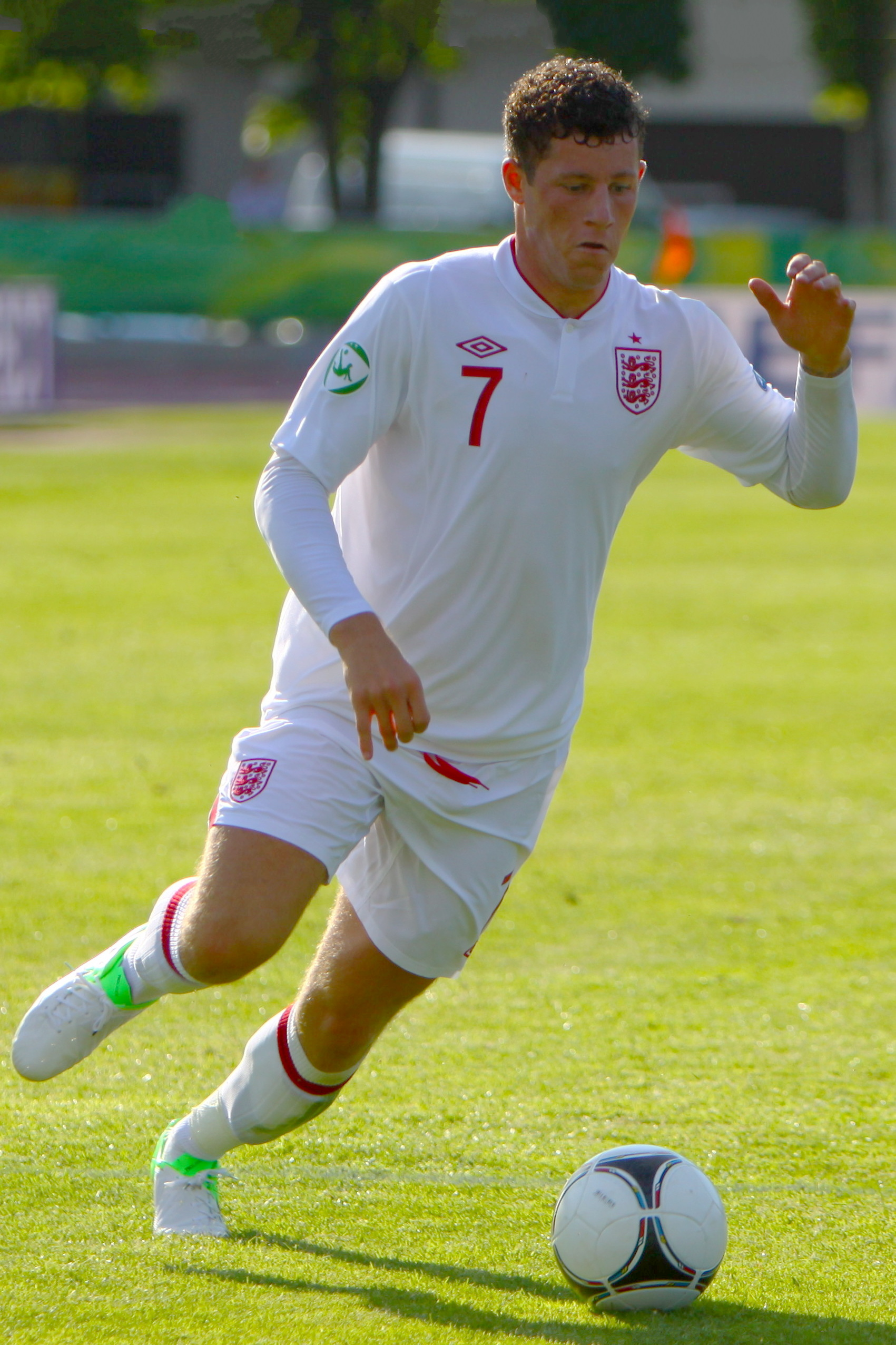
Barkley playing for England U19 in 2012

Barkley has represented England at under-16, under-17, under-19, under-20, under-21 and senior level.

He was selected to play in the 2009 Montaigu Tournament and captained the team to success, beating Germany 2–1 on penalties in the final. He also helped England win the 2010 UEFA European Under-17 Championship with two goals en route to the final where England beat Spain 2–1.

19 year-old Barkley was called up to the England U-21 squad in August 2011. On 28 May 2013, he was named in manager Peter Taylor's 21-man squad for the 2013 FIFA U-20 World Cup. He made his debut on 16 June, in a 3–0 win in a warm-up match against Uruguay. He scored his first goal for England under-21s on 13 August 2013, in a 6–0 win against Scotland.

Barkley was called up to the senior England squad in August 2013, and earned his first senior cap the following month, coming on as a substitute for Jack Wilshere in a 4–0 win in a World Cup qualifier against Moldova at Wembley. He was named in the England squad for the 2014 FIFA World Cup in Brazil, and made his World Cup debut as a 61st-minute substitute for Danny Welbeck in England's 2–1 opening defeat to Italy in Manaus. He played the full match in England's final group match, a 0–0 draw with Costa Rica in Belo Horizonte. He scored his first goal for the senior team in a 6–0 win against San Marino in a UEFA Euro 2016 qualifier in September 2015.

== Style of play ==
In 2013, then-Everton manager Roberto Martínez described Barkley as a mix of Paul Gascoigne and Michael Ballack. then-England manager Roy Hodgson said that Barkley's "pace and power" as well as his "excellent technique" were reminiscent of Gascoigne, and former England and Chelsea midfielder Frank Lampard said that Barkley reminded him of a young Wayne Rooney.

== Personal life ==
Barkley is of Nigerian descent through his paternal grandfather and bears his mother's maiden name instead of his father's name, Effanga. Barkley says that his father was "in and out" of his life during his childhood, but he was primarily raised by his mother alone.

In April 2017, Barkley was the victim of what his solicitors called an "unprovoked attack" after being punched twice in the face by a man in a Liverpool nightclub. In the aftermath to this attack, Kelvin MacKenzie, writing in The Sun newspaper, compared Barkley to "a gorilla in the zoo", leading to a police investigation into whether this constituted a racial hate crime. The Sun later issued an apology for the article, while Everton joined their rivals Liverpool in banning Sun journalists from their stadium and training ground.

In September 2019, police were called after Barkley was involved in an altercation with a taxi driver after dropping chips in a taxi. Police escorted the drunken Barkley to a cash machine so that he could pay for the taxi. Chelsea manager Frank Lampard stated that while Barkley acted in a naïve way, he had not broken any club rules and would not be punished. However, Barkley revealed in a later interview that, because this night out was the night before a Champions League game against Lille, he was punished by being made to travel to the game, but being forced to watch the match from inside the club coach.

In an interview in November 2025, Barkley stated that he had not drunk alcohol since the previous summer, as he was planning on going throughout the rest of his career without drinking.

== Career statistics ==
=== Club ===
As of match played 21 November 2026

Appearances and goals by club, season and competition
Club	Season	League			National cup (Note: Includes FA Cup, Coupe de France)		League cup (Note: Includes Football League/EFL Cup)		Europe		Other		Total	
Club	Season	Division	Apps	Goals	Apps	Goals	Apps	Goals	Apps	Goals	Apps	Goals	Apps	Goals
Everton	2010–11	Premier League	0	0	0	0	0	0	—		—		0	0
Everton	2011–12	Premier League	6	0	1	0	2	0	—		—		9	0
Everton	2012–13	Premier League	7	0	1	0	1	0	—		—		9	0
Everton	2013–14	Premier League	34	6	3	1	1	0	—		—		38	7
Everton	2014–15	Premier League	29	2	2	0	0	0	5 (Note: Appearance(s) in UEFA Europa League)	0	—		36	2
Everton	2015–16	Premier League	38	8	4	2	6	2	—		—		48	12
Everton	2016–17	Premier League	36	5	1	0	2	1	—		—		39	6
Everton	2017–18	Premier League	0	0	—		0	0	0	0	—		0	0
Everton	Total		150	21	12	3	12	3	5	0	—		179	27
Sheffield Wednesday (loan)	2012–13	Championship	13	4	—		—		—		—		13	4
Leeds United (loan)	2012–13	Championship	4	0	—		—		—		—		4	0
Chelsea	2017–18	Premier League	2	0	1	0	1	0	0	0	—		4	0
Chelsea	2018–19	Premier League	27	3	3	0	5	0	12	2	1 (Note: Appearance in FA Community Shield)	0	48	5
Chelsea	2019–20	Premier League	21	1	5	3	1	1	3 (Note: Appearances in UEFA Champions League)	0	1 (Note: Appearances in UEFA Super Cup)	0	31	5
Chelsea	2020–21	Premier League	2	0	—		1	1	—		—		3	1
Chelsea	2021–22	Premier League	6	1	2	0	3	0	3	0	0	0	14	1
Chelsea	Total		58	5	11	3	11	2	18	2	2	0	100	12
Aston Villa (loan)	2020–21	Premier League	24	3	0	0	—		—		—		24	3
Nice	2022–23	Ligue 1	27	4	1	0	—		0	0	—		28	4
Luton Town	2023–24	Premier League	32	5	4	0	1	0	—		—		37	5
Aston Villa	2024–25	Premier League	20	3	2	0	1	0	6	1	—		29	4
Aston Villa	2025–26	Premier League	21	3	1	0	0	0	1	0	—		23	3
Aston Villa	2026–27	Premier League	11	0	0	0	2	1	4	3	1	0	18	4
Aston Villa	Total		52	6	3	0	3	1	11	4	1	0	70	11
Career total			360	48	31	6	27	6	34	6	3	0	455	66

=== International ===
Appearances and goals by national team and year
National team	Year	Apps	Goals
England	2013	3	0
England	2014	7	0
England	2015	9	2
England	2016	3	0
England	2018	3	0
England	2019	8	4
Total		33	6

England score listed first, score column indicates score after each Barkley goal

List of international goals scored by Ross Barkley
No.	Date	Venue	Cap	Opponent	Score	Result	Competition	Ref.
1	5 September 2015	San Marino Stadium, Serravalle, San Marino	14	San Marino	3–0	6–0	UEFA Euro 2016 qualifying	
2	12 October 2015	LFF Stadium, Vilnius, Lithuania	17	Lithuania	1–0	3–0	UEFA Euro 2016 qualifying	
3	25 March 2019	Podgorica City Stadium, Podgorica, Montenegro	27	Montenegro	2–1	5–1	UEFA Euro 2020 qualifying	
4	25 March 2019	Podgorica City Stadium, Podgorica, Montenegro	27	Montenegro	3–1	5–1	UEFA Euro 2020 qualifying	
5	14 October 2019	Vasil Levski National Stadium, Sofia, Bulgaria	33	Bulgaria	2–0	6–0	UEFA Euro 2020 qualifying	
6	14 October 2019	Vasil Levski National Stadium, Sofia, Bulgaria	33	Bulgaria	3–0	6–0	UEFA Euro 2020 qualifying	

== Honours ==
Chelsea

- FA Cup: 2017–18; runner-up: 2019–20, 2021–22
- UEFA Europa League: 2018–19
- FIFA Club World Cup: 2021
- EFL Cup runner-up: 2018–19

Aston Villa

- UEFA Europa League: 2025–26

England U17

- UEFA European Under-17 Championship: 2010

England

- UEFA Nations League third place: 2018–19

Individual

- UEFA European Under-17 Championship Team of the Tournament: 2010
- Luton Town Player of the Season: 2023–24
- Everton Young Player of the Year: 2012–13, 2013–14
- Sheffield Wednesday Player of the Month: October 2012
