= Alfie Doughty =

English footballer (born 1999)

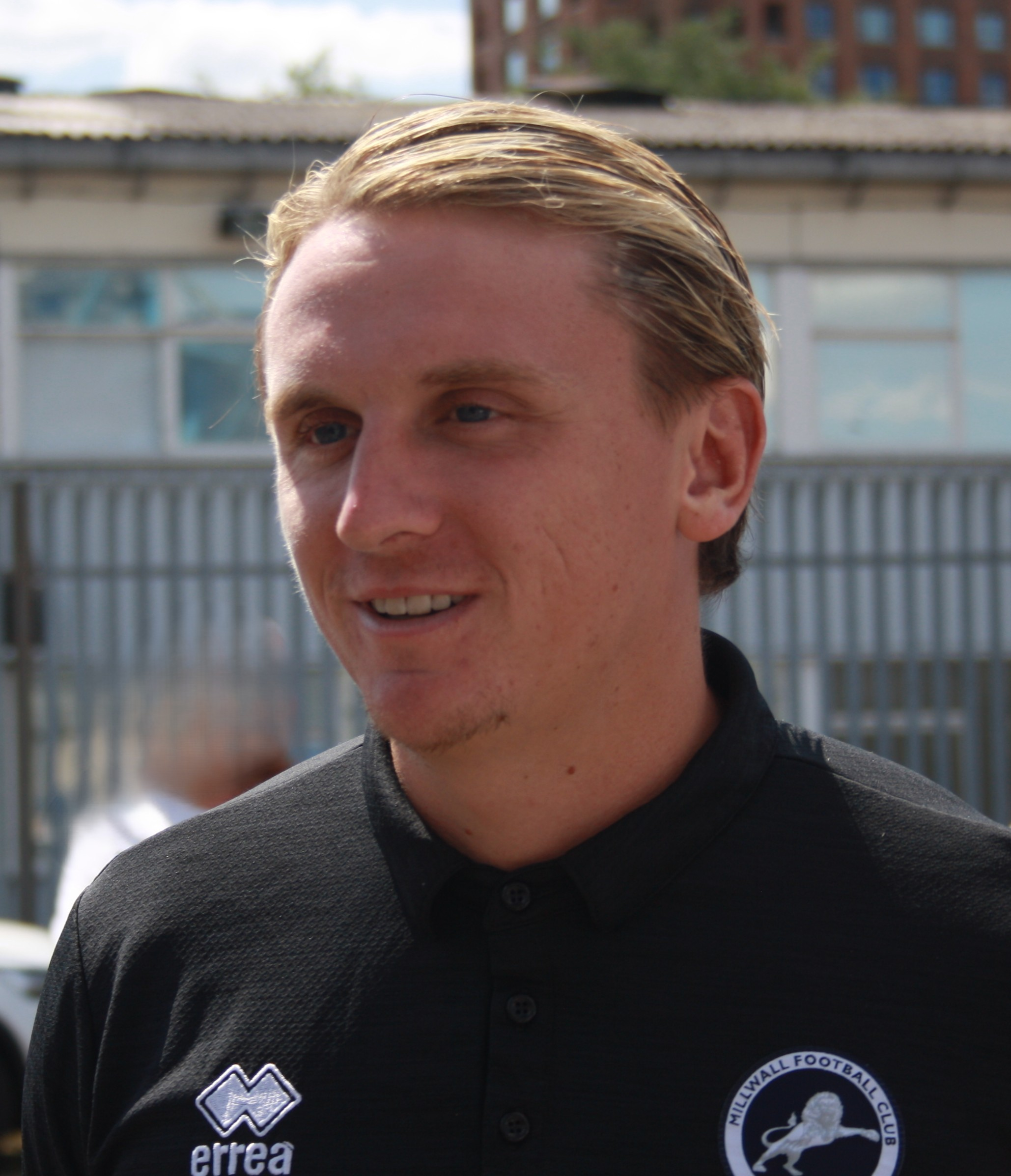
- Alfie Doughty in 2026

Personal information
- Full name: Alfie Henry Doughty
- Date of birth: 21 December 1999 (age 26)
- Place of birth: Hatfield, England
- Height: 1.83 m (6 ft 0 in)
- Positions: Full-back; wing-back; midfielder

Team information
- Current team: Millwall
- Number: 45

Youth career
- 2007–2018: Charlton Athletic

Senior career*
Years	Team	Apps	(Gls)
2018–2021	Charlton Athletic	36	(3)
2018–2019	→ Kingstonian (loan)	13	(3)
2019	→ Bromley (loan)	8	(2)
2021–2022	Stoke City	11	(0)
2022	→ Cardiff City (loan)	9	(1)
2022–2025	Luton Town	91	(5)
2025–	Millwall	28	(0)
- * Club domestic league appearances and goals as of 02:38, 2 November 2026 (UTC)

Alfie Henry Doughty (born 21 December 1999) is an English professional footballer who plays as a full-back, wing-back or midfielder for EFL Championship club Millwall.

== Career ==
=== Charlton Athletic ===
Doughty joined the Charlton Athletic Academy at the age of eight and progressed through the youth teams to the first team where he made his debut in the EFL Cup against Milton Keynes Dons on 14 August 2018.

On 19 October 2018, Doughty joined Kingstonian on loan until 17 November 2018. Doughty scored two goals for Kingstonian on his league debut for the club against Harlow Town. In total Doughty made 16 first team appearances for Kingstonian - 13 in the league - scoring four goals, three of which came in league matches. On 7 September, Doughty joined Bromley on a one-month loan.

Doughty returned to first team action for Charlton against Forest Green Rovers in the first round of the EFL Cup on 13 August 2019 before breaking into the first team on a regular basis at the club later in the 2019–20 season. Doughty made 30 appearances for the Addicks as they suffered relegation from the Championship on the final day of the season. His performances during the season saw him voted as Charlton's young player of the year. Doughty started the 2020–21 season in good form but suffered a season ending hamstring injury on 24 October 2020 away at Northampton Town. In January 2021, Doughty turned down a new contract offer from Charlton following interest from Stoke City.

=== Stoke City ===
On 22 January 2021, Doughty moved to Stoke City for an undisclosed fee. Doughty returned from his injury in July 2021 and scored in a pre-season friendly against Hibernian. However he was unable to establish himself in Michael O'Neill's team and was limited to 11 league appearances all as a substitute. On 29 January 2022, Doughty joined Cardiff City loan on loan for the remainder of the 2021–22 season. Doughty made nine appearances for the Bluebirds, scoring once before his loan was cut short due to injury.

=== Luton Town ===
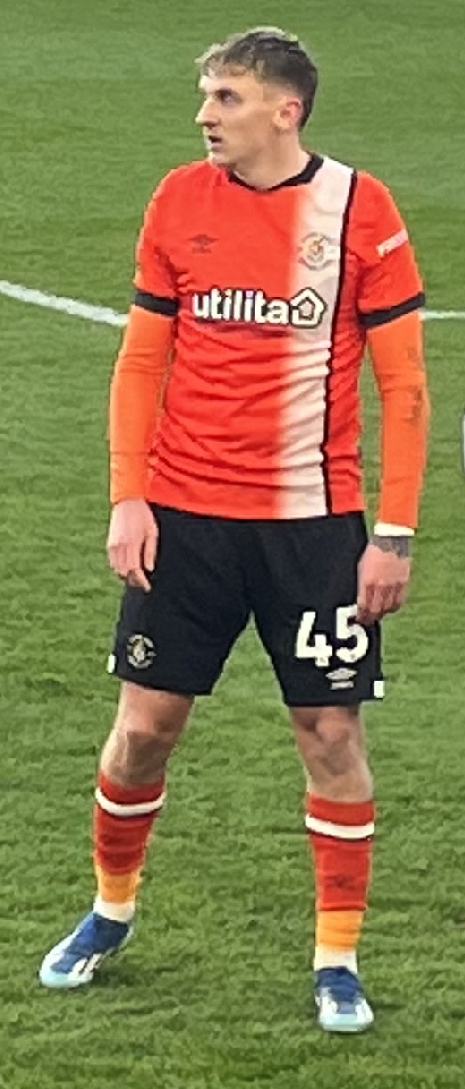
Alfie Doughty with Luton Town in 2024.

On 20 June 2022, Doughty joined Luton Town for an undisclosed fee.

Doughty made his Luton debut in a 1–0 win at Norwich City in the EFL Championship on 18 October 2022. He scored his first goal for the club in a 3–0 win at Queens Park Rangers on 29 December. The goal was later nominated for the Championship's Goal of the Month award for December 2022.

On 16 May 2023, he assisted Tom Lockyer's decisive goal in Luton's 2–0 win over Sunderland in the Championship play-off semi-final, giving the Hatters a 3–2 aggregate win. He played 84 minutes of the play-off final against Coventry City at Wembley Stadium, where Luton were promoted to the Premier League with a 6–5 penalty shootout win.

Doughty made his Premier League debut as a 64th-minute substitute for Issa Kaboré in the team's opening match of the 2023–24 season, a 4–1 loss at Brighton & Hove Albion on 12 August. His first goal of the season came in a 3–2 EFL Cup win at home to Gillingham on 29 August. The goal was later awarded EFL Cup Goal of the Round on 8 September.

On 30 September, Doughty assisted Carlton Morris's winning goal against Everton at Goodison Park – Luton's first Premier League win. He scored his first Premier League goal in a 3–2 win at Sheffield United on 26 December.

=== Millwall ===
On 28 July 2025, Doughty joined Millwall for an undisclosed fee, that included a sell-on clause to academy team Charlton Athletic of £0.

== Career statistics ==
As of match played 31 October 2026

Appearances and goals by club, season and competition
Club	Season	League			FA Cup		League Cup		Other		Total	
Club	Season	Division	Apps	Goals	Apps	Goals	Apps	Goals	Apps	Goals	Apps	Goals
Charlton Athletic	2018–19	League One	0	0	0	0	1	0	0	0	1	0
Charlton Athletic	2019–20	Championship	29	2	0	0	1	0	—		30	2
Charlton Athletic	2020–21	League One	7	1	0	0	2	0	1 (Note: One appearance in EFL Trophy)	0	10	1
Charlton Athletic	Total		36	3	0	0	4	0	1	0	41	3
Kingstonian (loan)	2018–19	Isthmian League Premier Division	13	3	0	0	0	0	3 (Note: Two appearances and one goal in FA Trophy and one appearance in Surrey Senior Cup)	1	16	4
Bromley (loan)	2019–20	National League	8	2	1	0	0	0	0	0	9	2
Stoke City	2020–21	Championship	0	0	0	0	0	0	—		0	0
Stoke City	2021–22	Championship	11	0	1	0	4	0	—		16	0
Stoke City	Total		11	0	1	0	4	0	0	0	16	0
Cardiff City (loan)	2021–22	Championship	9	1	—		—		—		9	1
Luton Town	2022–23	Championship	28	2	4	0	0	0	3 (Note: Appearances in the Championship play-offs)	0	35	2
Luton Town	2023–24	Premier League	37	2	4	0	2	1	—		43	3
Luton Town	2024–25	Championship	26	1	0	0	1	0	—		27	1
Luton Town	Total		91	5	8	0	3	1	3	0	105	6
Millwall	2025–26	Championship	25	0	1	0	0	0	2	0	28	0
Millwall	2026–27	Championship	3	0	0	0	0	0	—		3	0
Millwall	Total		28	0	1	0	0	0	2	0	31	0
Career total			196	14	11	0	11	1	9	1	227	16

== Honours ==
Luton Town

- EFL Championship play-offs: 2023

Individual

- Charlton Athletic Young Player of the Year: 2019–20
