= 2026 EFL Trophy final =

- Event: 2025–26 EFL Trophy
Luton Town	Stockport County
3	1
- Date: 12 April 2026
- Venue: Wembley Stadium, London
- Attendance: 49,517

The 2026 EFL Trophy final, known as the Vertu Trophy final for sponsorship reasons, was an association football match that was played on 12 April 2026 at Wembley Stadium, London, England. It was played between League One teams Luton Town and Stockport County. The match decided the winners of the 2025–26 EFL Trophy, a knock-out tournament comprising clubs from League One and League Two of the English Football League (EFL), as well as 16 Category One academy sides representing Premier League and Championship clubs. Luton won their second title, having first won the competition in 2009. Stockport finished as runners-up for the third time, having done so in 1992 and 1993. Both clubs are nicknamed "The Hatters".

The match was televised live on Sky Sports Football and was available for streaming via Sky Go. Highlights were shown on free-to-air channel ITV4 later that evening. A national radio broadcast was provided by Talksport 2, with local stations BBC Three Counties Radio and BBC Radio Manchester also having their own match commentaries.

== Route to the final ==
Note: In all results below, the score of the finalist is given first (H: home; A: away).

Luton Town		Round	Stockport County	
Opponent	Result	Group stage	Opponent	Result
Barnet	4–1 (H)	Matchday 1	Wolverhampton Wanderers U21	5–3 (H)
Cambridge United	1–3 (A)	Matchday 2	Salford City	1–3 (A)
Brighton & Hove Albion U21	3–1 (H)	Matchday 3	Wigan Athletic	1–1 (6–5 p) (H)
Southern section Group H: Pos / Team / Pld / Pts; 1 / Luton Town / 3 / 6; 2 / Cambridge United / 3 / 6; 3 / Barnet / 3 / 5; 4 / Brighton & Hove Albion U21 / 3 / 1; Source: EFL		Final standings	Northern section Group A: Pos / Team / Pld / Pts; 1 / Salford City / 3 / 9; 2 / Stockport County / 3 / 5; 3 / Wolverhampton Wanderers U21 / 3 / 3; 4 / Wigan Athletic / 3 / 1; Source: EFL	
Opponent	Result	Knockout stage	Opponent	Result
Exeter City	4–0 (H)	Round of 32	Crewe Alexandra	1–1 (4–1 p) (A)
Swindon Town	1–2 (H) (Note: Swindon Town defeated Luton Town in the last 16, eliminating them from the competition. However as a result of Swindon fielding two ineligible players in the tie, Luton were fully reinstated in the Quarter-finals after Swindon have been withdrawn from the competition.)	Round of 16	Harrogate Town	2–1 (H)
Plymouth Argyle	2–1 (H)	Quarter-final	Port Vale	4–0 (A)
Northampton Town	2–1 (H)	Semi-final	Doncaster Rovers	1–0 (A)

== Match ==
=== Details ===
12 April 2026
15:00 BST

Luton Town	3–1	Stockport County
Lawrence 22'; Wells 39', 90+1'	Report	Sidibeh 11'

Wembley Stadium, London
Attendance: 49,517
Referee: Martin Coy
Assistant Referees: Marc Wilson, Joe Simpson

Luton Town	Stockport County

GK	1	(England) James Shea
RB	25	(Guyana) Isaiah Jones	(yellow card) 78'	(substituted off) 87'
CB	16	(England) Hakeem Odoffin
CB	5	(Denmark) Mads Andersen
LB	3	(Scotland) Kal Naismith (c)
DM	8	(England) Liam Walsh
RM	27	(England) Jake Richards	(yellow card) 76'	(substituted off) 88'
CM	18	(England) Jordan Clark
CM	54	(Jamaica) Kasey Palmer		(substituted off) 90+7'
LM	32	(Scotland) Emilio Lawrence		(substituted off) 77'
CF	21	(Bermuda) Nahki Wells	(yellow card) 90+2'	(substituted off) 90+7'
Substitutes:
GK	24	(Republic of Ireland) Josh Keeley
DF	17	(Netherlands) Nigel Lonwijk		(substituted on) 88'
MF	23	(Northern Ireland) George Saville		(substituted on) 90+7'
FW	12	(Iraq) Ali Al-Hamadi
FW	14	(England) Shayden Morris		(substituted on) 87'
FW	22	(Jamaica) Devante Cole		(substituted on) 90+7'
FW	30	(England) Gideon Kodua		(substituted on) 77'
Manager:
(England) Jack Wilshere

GK	34	(Jamaica) Corey Addai
RB	14	(England) Tayo Edun
CB	5	(Nigeria) Joseph Olowu		(substituted off) 65'
CB	15	(England) Ethan Pye	(yellow card) 37'
LB	23	(England) Ben Osborn
DM	27	(England) Odin Bailey		(substituted off) 85'
DM	26	(Northern Ireland) Oliver Norwood (c)
AM	7	(England) Jack Diamond		(substituted off) 90+3'
AM	28	(England) Josh Stokes		(substituted off) 85'
CF	19	(England) Kyle Wootton
CF	29	(The Gambia) Adama Sidibeh		(substituted off) 65'
Substitutes:
GK	1	(England) Ben Hinchliffe
DF	3	(England) Owen Dodgson		(substituted on) 90+3'
MF	4	(England) Lewis Bate		(substituted on) 85'
MF	48	(England) Che Gardner
FW	9	(England) Tanto Olaofe		(substituted on) 65'
FW	11	(Jamaica) Malik Mothersille		(substituted on) 65'
FW	20	(Republic of Ireland) Louie Barry		(substituted on) 85'
Manager:
(England) Dave Challinor
