= Luton Town F.C. Player of the Season =

English football club award

Luton Town Football Club players of the season are voted for at the end of each season. There are a number of awards given at the end of season award ceremony:

- Luton Town Supporters' Trust (LTST) Player of the Season
- Players' Player of the Season
- Young Player of the Season
- Internet Player of the Season
- LTST Junior Members' Player of the Season
- Goal of the Season

== Supporters' Trust Player of the Season ==
As of the end of the 2025–26 season

Season	Name	Position	Nationality	Ref.
1999–2000	Gary Doherty	Defender	Republic of Ireland	
2000–01	Matthew Taylor	Midfielder	England	
2001–02	Steve Howard	Striker	Scotland	
2002–03	Chris Coyne	Defender	Australia	
2003–04	Emmerson Boyce	Defender	Barbados	
2004–05	Kevin Nicholls	Midfielder	England	
2005–06	Markus Heikkinen	Defender	Finland	
2006–07	Leon Barnett	Defender	England	
2007–08	Keith Keane	Midfielder	Republic of Ireland	
2008–09	Keith Keane	Midfielder	Republic of Ireland	
2009–10	George Pilkington	Defender	England	
2010–11	Mark Tyler	Goalkeeper	England	
2011–12	János Kovács	Defender	Hungary	
2012–13	Alex Lawless	Midfielder	Wales	
2013–14	Steve McNulty	Defender	England	
2014–15	Nathan Doyle	Midfielder	England	
2015–16	Jack Marriott	Striker	England	
2016–17	Danny Hylton	Striker	England	
2017–18	Alan Sheehan	Defender	Republic of Ireland	
2018–19	Jack Stacey	Defender	England	
2019–20	Pelly Ruddock Mpanzu	Midfielder	England	
2020–21	Simon Sluga	Goalkeeper	Croatia	
2021–22	Kal Naismith	Defender	Scotland	
2022–23	Tom Lockyer	Defender	Wales	
2023–24	Ross Barkley	Midfielder	England	
2024–25	Jordan Clark	Midfielder	England	
2025–26	Jordan Clark	Midfielder	England	

== Young Player of the Season ==
As of the end of the 2025–26 season

Season	Name	Position	Nationality	Ref.
1999–2000	Matthew Taylor	Midfielder	England	
2000–01	Lee Mansell	Midfielder	England	
2001–02	Kevin Foley	Defender	Republic of Ireland	
2002–03	Kevin Foley	Defender	Republic of Ireland	
2003–04	Kevin Foley	Defender	Republic of Ireland	
2004–05	Curtis Davies	Defender	England	
2005–06	Keith Keane	Midfielder	Republic of Ireland	
2006–07	Dean Brill	Goalkeeper	England	
2007–08	Ryan Charles	Striker	England	
2008–09	Jake Howells	Defender	Wales	
2009–10	Jake Howells	Defender	Wales	
2010–11	Jake Howells	Defender	Wales	
2011–12	Adam Watkins	Midfielder	England	
2013–14	Andre Gray	Striker	England	
2014–15	Luke Trotman	Defender	England	
2015–16	Jack Marriott	Striker	England	
2015–16	Cameron McGeehan	Midfielder	Northern Ireland	
2016–17	James Justin	Defender	England	
2017–18	Jack Stacey	Defender	England	
2018–19	James Justin	Defender	England	
2019–20	Sam Beckwith	Midfielder	England	
2020–21	Aidan Francis-Clarke	Defender	England	
2021–22	Ed McJannet	Midfielder	Republic of Ireland	
2022–23	Joe Johnson	Defender	England	
2023–24	Zack Nelson	Midfielder	England	
2024–25	Christ Makosso	Defender	Congo	
2025–26	Jake Richards	Midfielder	England	
