= Liam Walsh (footballer) =

English footballer

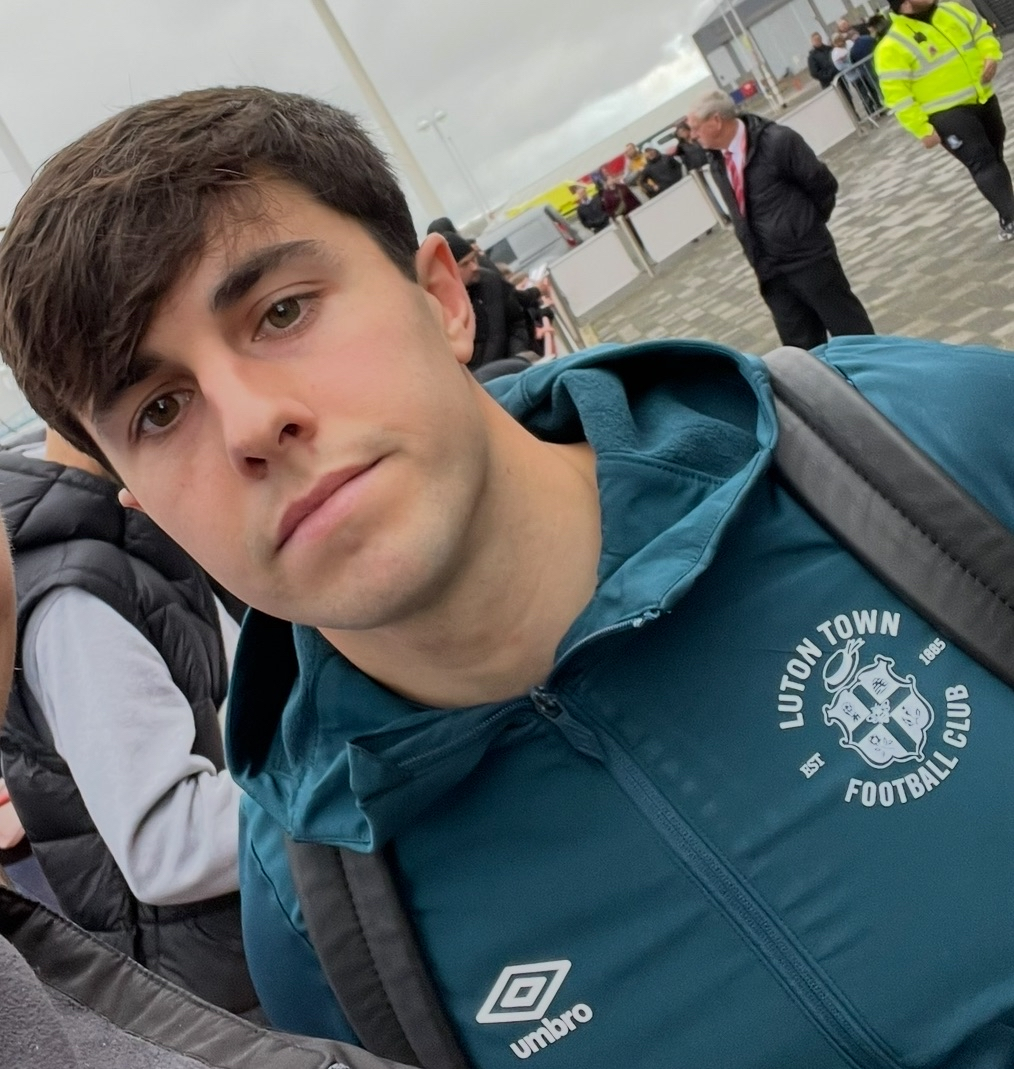
- Walsh in 2024

Personal information
- Full name: Liam Walsh
- Date of birth: 15 September 1997 (age 29)
- Place of birth: Huyton, Merseyside
- Height: 6 ft 3 in (1.90 m)
- Position: Midfielder

Team information
- Current team: Luton Town
- Number: 8

Youth career
- 2003–2015: Everton

Senior career*
Years	Team	Apps	(Gls)
2015–2018	Everton	0	(0)
2016	→ Yeovil Town (loan)	15	(1)
2017–2018	→ Birmingham City (loan)	3	(0)
2018–2021	Bristol City	18	(0)
2019–2020	→ Coventry City (loan)	26	(3)
2021–2024	Swansea City	32	(2)
2022	→ Hull City (loan)	3	(0)
2024–	Luton Town	74	(1)

International career
2012	England U16	1	(0)
2014–2015	England U18	2	(0)
- * Club domestic league appearances and goals as of 18:54, 21 November 2026 (UTC)

Liam Walsh (born 15 September 1997) is an English professional footballer who plays as a midfielder for EFL League One club Luton Town.

He started his career at Everton, and also spent time on loan at Yeovil Town, for whom he made his Football League debut, and at Birmingham City and Coventry City.

== Club career ==
=== Everton ===
Born in Huyton, England, Walsh started his career at Everton when he joined them at five years old. In July 2014, Walsh signed a scholarships with the academy. Eight months later, he signed his first professional contract with the club. Walsh progressed through Everton's academy, regularly appearing for the Under-18 and Under-23 sides.

On 1 August 2015, Walsh appeared in the first team for the first time as an unused substitute, in a 2–0 loss against Leeds United. In November 2015, he scored a memorable goal from the halfway line during an Under-18 game against Derby. As a result, he was awarded the club's Goal of the Month for November.

After his loan spell at Yeovil Town ended, Walsh continued to feature for the Under-23 sides in the 2016–17 season. He started the season well when he set up two goals as captain, in a 2–0 win over Bolton Wanderers in the Group Stage of EFL Trophy. He shortly signed a contract extension with the club, keeping him until 2019. Walsh then became a regular in the midfield position for the Under-23 sides, under David Unsworth's side. His number of outstanding performance resulted in him being named Premier League 2 Player of the Month in February 2017. After helping the side win the Premier League 2 title at the end of the season, Walsh was shortlisted for the league's Player of the Year award. Walsh was also called up to the England squad for the U20 World Cup in South Korea but suffered an injury towards the end of the 2016/17 season which meant he was unable to participate.

==== Loan spells ====
On 6 January 2016, Walsh joined Football League Two side Yeovil Town on a one-month loan, and made his debut four days later in the FA Cup third round against Carlisle United. He then set up a goal for Jack Compton, who later scored a hat–trick, in a 3–2 win over AFC Wimbledon on 30 January 2016, followed up by scoring his first goal for the club, in a 1–1 draw against Luton Town. The initial loan was extended on two occasions, before extending it until the end of the season. Despite missing out on two occasions, due to illness and suspension, Walsh finished the 2016–17 season, making 17 appearances in all competitions. After his loan spell at Yeovil Town came to an end, Walsh reflected his time there, stating he "became a man."

Walsh signed for Championship club Birmingham City on 31 August 2017, on loan until 3 January 2018. He was one of six debutants in the starting eleven for Birmingham's next fixture, away to Norwich City; he played 57 minutes and was yellow-carded in the first half as his team lost 1–0. He appeared twice more under Harry Redknapp's management, but not at all under successor Steve Cotterill, and returned to train with his parent club in mid-November, although the loan remained in force until its official expiry date.

=== Bristol City ===
On 5 January 2018, Walsh signed a two-and-a-half-year contract with Championship club Bristol City, joining for an undisclosed fee. Upon joining the club, Manager Lee Johnson said about Walsh: "I think Liam gives us something slightly different to what we have already and adds to the qualities we already have in midfield. He loves getting on the ball and is a very good passer with both his left and right foot. He's a brilliant player, who can come in and compete immediately. Hopefully he can improve and he improves us." Walsh, himself, felt leaving Everton for Bristol City was a right time for him to leave.

Walsh made his Bristol City debut, coming on as a second–half substitute in the 72nd minutes, in a 2–1 loss against Manchester City in the Semi-final first leg of the EFL Cup. On 13 January 2018, he made his league debut for the club, where he started and played 69 minutes before being substituted, in a 1–0 loss against Norwich City. However, Walsh spent the rest of the season being featured in and out of the first team. At the end of the 2017–18 season, he went on to make eight appearances for the side in all competitions.

He scored his first goal for City in an EFL Cup tie against Queens Park Rangers on 13 August 2019.

On 2 September 2019, Walsh signed for League One side Coventry City on loan until the end of the season. His performances for Coventry during the 2019–20 season led to Walsh being named in the League One PFA Team of the Year.

On 14 May 2021, Walsh was released by Bristol City following the expiration of his contract.

=== Swansea City ===
Walsh joined Swansea City on a free transfer on 8 July 2021; he signed a three-year contract.

==== Hull City (loan) ====
On 31 January 2022, Walsh joined Hull City on loan until the end of the 2021–22 season. He made his debut on 8 February, in the away match against Derby County.

Walsh left Swansea when his contract expired at the end of the 2023–24 season.

=== Luton Town ===
On 20 August 2024, following a trial period with the club, Walsh joined Championship side Luton Town. On 12 April 2026, he started in the squad that won the 2026 EFL Trophy final.

On 5 June 2026, Walsh signed a new contract with the club.

== International career ==
Walsh is eligible to play for England and Italy.

After representing England U16 side in 2012, Walsh was called up by England U18 for the first time on 16 September 2014. He made his England U18 debut on 24 September 2014, where he started the whole game, in a 2–0 loss against Italy U18. Walsh went on to make appearance for England U18 side.

== Personal life ==
Walsh attended Cardinal Heenan Catholic High School in West Derby and Wade Deacon High School in Widnes. Apart from his father, Walsh's family are Everton supporters. Walsh is in a relationship with Aston Villa midfielder Missy Bo Kearns; the pair announced Kearns was pregnant with their first child in March 2026, before revealing they had suffered a miscarriage later that month.

== Career statistics ==
As of match played 21 November 2026

Appearances and goals by club, season and competition
Club	Season	League			FA Cup		League Cup		Other		Total	
Club	Season	Division	Apps	Goals	Apps	Goals	Apps	Goals	Apps	Goals	Apps	Goals
Everton	2015–16	Premier League	0	0	—		0	0	—		0	0
Everton	2016–17	Premier League	0	0	0	0	0	0	—		0	0
Everton	2017–18	Premier League	0	0	0	0	—		0	0	0	0
Everton	Total		0	0	0	0	0	0	0	0	0	0
Everton U23	2016–17	—			—		—		2 (Note: Appearances in EFL Trophy)	0	2	0
Yeovil Town (loan)	2015–16	League Two	15	1	2	0	0	0	0	0	17	1
Birmingham City (loan)	2017–18	Championship	3	0	—		—		—		3	0
Bristol City	2017–18	Championship	6	0	—		2	0	—		8	0
Bristol City	2018–19	Championship	9	0	0	0	1	0	—		10	0
Bristol City	2019–20	Championship	0	0	0	0	1	1	—		1	1
Bristol City	2020–21	Championship	3	0	0	0	0	0	—		3	0
Bristol City	Total		18	0	0	0	4	1	—		22	1
Coventry City (loan)	2019–20	League One	26	3	7	1	—		1	0	34	4
Swansea City	2021–22	Championship	5	0	1	0	1	0	—		7	0
Swansea City	2022–23	Championship	7	0	0	0	0	0	—		7	0
Swansea City	2023–24	Championship	20	2	0	0	0	0	—		20	2
Swansea City	Total		32	2	1	0	1	0	—		34	2
Hull City (loan)	2021–22	Championship	3	0	—		—		—		3	0
Luton Town	2024–25	Championship	26	0	2	0	2	0	—		28	0
Luton Town	2025–26	League One	33	1	2	0	1	0	4	1	40	2
Luton Town	2026–27	League One	15	0	1	0	2	0	2	0	20	0
Luton Town	Total		74	1	5	0	5	0	6	1	88	2
Career total			171	7	15	1	10	1	9	1	203	10

== Honours ==
Coventry City

- EFL League One: 2019–20

Luton Town

- EFL Trophy: 2025–26

Individual

- PFA Team of the Year: 2019–20 League One
