= Lamine Fanne =

Spanish footballer (born 2004)

Personal information
- Full name: Mouhamed Lamine Fanne Dabo
- Date of birth: 30 January 2004 (age 22)
- Place of birth: Kandiounkou, Senegal
- Height: 1.85 m (6 ft 1 in)
- Position: Midfielder

Team information
- Current team: Venezia
- Number: 8

Youth career
- Constància
- 2023–2024: AIK

Senior career*
Years	Team	Apps	(Gls)
2024	AIK	20	(0)
2025–2026	Luton Town	33	(1)
2026–	Venezia	2	(0)
2026	→ Pescara (loan)	7	(0)
- * Club domestic league appearances and goals as of 23:44, 17 October 2026 (UTC)

Mouhamed Lamine Fanne Dabo (born 30 January 2004) is a Spanish professional footballer who plays as a midfielder for Serie A club Venezia.

== Career ==
Fanne was born in Kandiounkou, Senegal, moving to Spain as a young child. He played for Constància before moving to Swedish club AIK in 2023. In August 2024 he signed for EFL League One club Luton Town, effective from 1 January 2025.

On 1 February 2026 he signed a four-and-a-half-year contract with Serie B club Venezia. The next day he was loaned to Pescara.

== Career statistics ==
As of match played 2 September 2026

Appearances and goals by club, season and competition
Club	Season	League			National cup (Note: Includes Swedish Cup, FA Cup, Coppa Italia)		League cup (Note: Includes EFL Cup)		Other		Total	
Club	Season	Division	Apps	Goals	Apps	Goals	Apps	Goals	Apps	Goals	Apps	Goals
AIK	2024	Allsvenskan	20	0	2	0	—		—		22	0
Luton Town	2024–25	Championship	12	0	1	0	0	0	—		13	0
Luton Town	2025–26	League One	21	1	2	1	1	0	3 (Note: Appearances in EFL Trophy)	0	27	2
Luton Town	Total		33	1	3	1	1	0	3	0	40	2
Venezia	2025–26	Serie B	0	0	0	0	—		—		0	0
Venezia	2026–27	Serie A	0	0	2	0	—		—		2	0
Venezia	Total		0	0	2	0	—		—		2	0
Pescara (loan)	2025–26	Serie B	6	0	0	0	—		—		6	0
Career total			59	1	7	1	1	0	3	0	65	2
