= Emilio Lawrence =

Scottish footballer (born 2005)

Personal information
- Full name: Emilio Alford Anthony Lawrence
- Date of birth: 20 September 2005 (age 21)
- Place of birth: Manchester, England
- Height: 1.75 m (5 ft 9 in)
- Position: Winger

Team information
- Current team: Luton Town (on loan from Manchester City)
- Number: 11

Youth career
- 2012–2022: Everton
- 2022–2026: Manchester City

Senior career*
| Years | Team | Apps | (Gls) |
| 2026– | Manchester City | 0 | (0) |
| 2026 | → Luton Town (loan) | 17 | (1) |
| 2026– | → Luton Town (loan) | 11 | (0) |

International career^{‡}
| 2020 | England U15 | 1 | (0) |
| 2021 | Scotland U16 | 1 | (0) |
| 2021 | England U16 | 1 | (0) |
| 2025– | Scotland U21 | 5 | (4) |
- * Club domestic league appearances and goals as of 22:48, 3 November 2026 (UTC) ‡ National team caps and goals as of 03:01, 12 January 2026 (UTC)

Emilio Alford Anthony Lawrence (born 20 September 2005) is a professional footballer who plays as a winger for EFL League One club Luton Town, on loan from Premier League club Manchester City. Born in England, he plays for the Scotland U21s.

== Club career ==
A product of the youth academy of Everton, Lawrence joined the academy of Manchester City in 2022.

On 8 January 2026, he joined Luton Town on loan in the EFL League One for the rest of the 2025–26 season. On 10 January 2025, he made his senior and professional debut with Luton Town in a 2–1 League One win over Stevenage.

He scored his first senior goal against Stockport County at Kenilworth Road on 21 March 2026.

He was in the squad for the 2026 EFL Trophy final, in which he scored in the 22nd minute to take Luton level with Stockport County. They achieved a 3–1 victory, with Lawrence winning the first trophy of his career.

== International career ==
Born in England, Lawrence was born to an English father of Jamaican descent, and a Scottish mother. He represented both the Scotland and England U16s in 2021. He was first called up to the Scotland U21s for a set of 2025 UEFA European Under-21 Championship qualification matches in October 2023.

== Career statistics ==
=== Club ===
As of match played 17 November 2026

Appearances and goals by club, season and competition
| Club | Season | League | | | FA Cup | | League Cup | | Other | | Total | |
| Club | Season | Division | Apps | Goals | Apps | Goals | Apps | Goals | Apps | Goals | Apps | Goals |
|---|---|---|---|---|---|---|---|---|---|---|---|---|
| Manchester City U21 | 2023–24 | – | | | – | | – | | 2 (Note: Appearance(s) in EFL Trophy) | 0 | 2 | 0 |
| Manchester City U21 | 2024–25 | – | | | – | | – | | 2 | 0 | 2 | 0 |
| Manchester City U21 | 2025–26 | – | | | – | | – | | 3 | 0 | 3 | 0 |
| Manchester City U21 | Total | | – | | – | | – | | 7 | 0 | 7 | 0 |
| Manchester City | 2025–26 | Premier League | 0 | 0 | 0 | 0 | 0 | 0 | 0 | 0 | 0 | 0 |
| Manchester City | 2026–27 | Premier League | 0 | 0 | 0 | 0 | 0 | 0 | 0 | 0 | 0 | 0 |
| Manchester City | Total | | 0 | 0 | 0 | 0 | 0 | 0 | 0 | 0 | 0 | 0 |
| Luton Town (loan) | 2025–26 | League One | 17 | 1 | – | | – | | 4 | 1 | 21 | 2 |
| Luton Town (loan) | 2026–27 | League One | 11 | 0 | 1 | 1 | 1 | 0 | 3 | 0 | 16 | 1 |
| Luton Town (loan) | Total | | 28 | 1 | 1 | 1 | 1 | 0 | 7 | 1 | 37 | 3 |
| Career total | | | 28 | 1 | 1 | 1 | 1 | 0 | 14 | 1 | 44 | 3 |

== Honours ==
Luton Town

- EFL Trophy: 2025–26
