= Jake Richards (footballer) =

English footballer (born 2007)

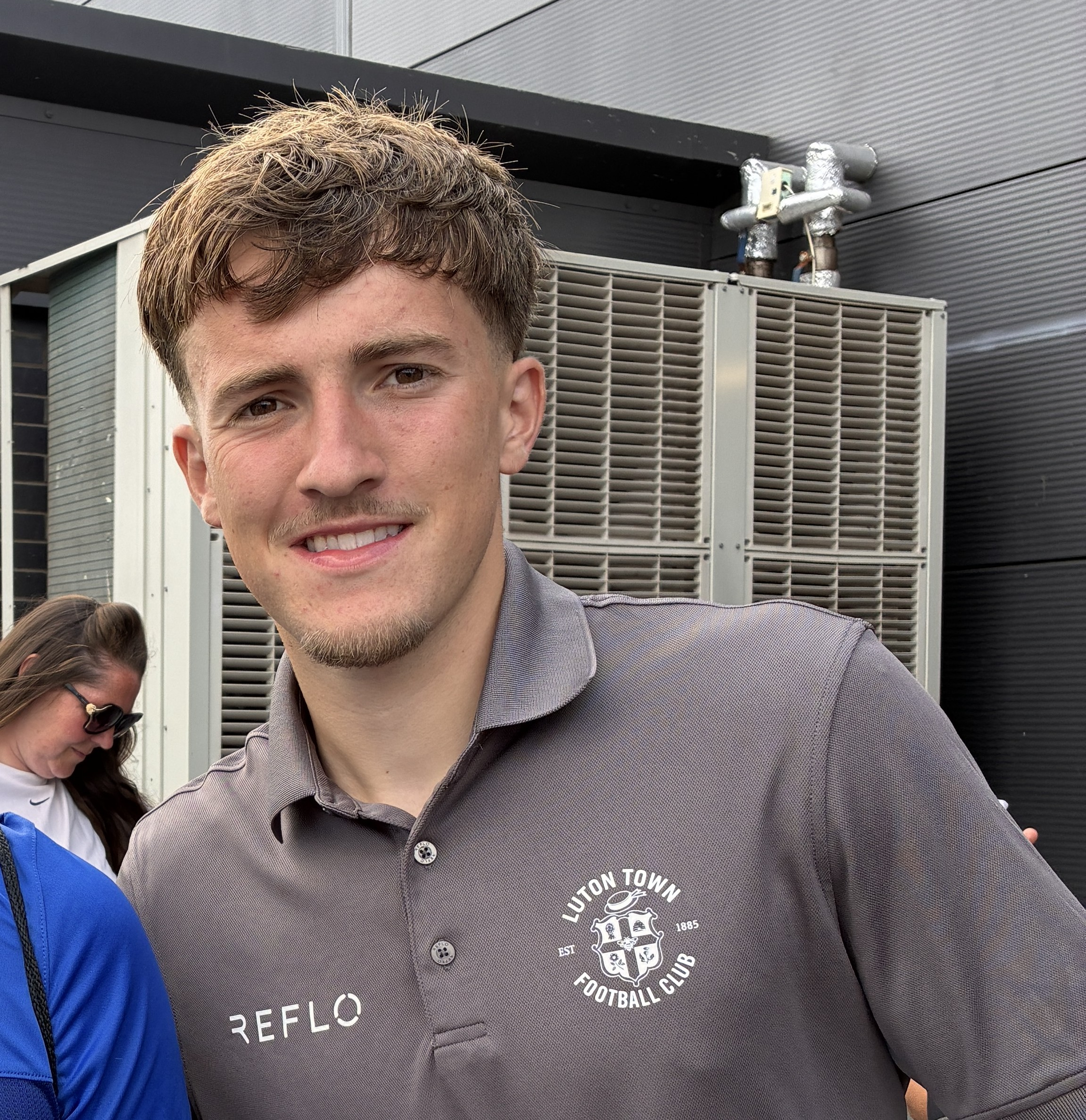
- Richards in 2026 with Luton Town

Personal information
- Full name: Jake Thomas Richards
- Date of birth: 8 August 2007 (age 19)
- Place of birth: Devon, England
- Height: 1.80 m (5 ft 11 in)
- Positions: Midfielder; winger

Team information
- Current team: Luton Town
- Number: 7

Youth career
- –2018: Yeovil Town
- 2018–2023: Exeter City

Senior career*
| Years | Team | Apps | (Gls) |
| 2023–2025 | Exeter City | 19 | (1) |
| 2025– | Luton Town | 42 | (6) |
- * Club domestic league appearances and goals as of 18:52, 21 November 2026 (UTC)

Jake Thomas Richards (born 8 August 2007) is an English footballer who plays as a midfielder for EFL League One club Luton Town.

A graduate of the Exeter City academy, Richards played for the club until a move to Luton in 2025.

== Career ==
=== Exeter City ===
After having previously played for Yeovil Town's academy, Richards joined Exeter City at Under-12's level and progressed through the ranks to sign an academy scholarship in August 2023. He made his senior debut the following week in a 2–1 EFL Cup victory over Crawley Town. He made his league debut a month later in a defeat to Leyton Orient. On 27 April 2025, he was named EFL League One Apprentice of the Season.

On 1 July 2025, Exeter City announced that Richards had informed them of his intentions to explore other opportunities away from the club.

=== Luton Town ===
On 5 July 2025, Richards joined fellow League One side Luton Town, with Exeter City receiving a training compensation fee.

Richards made his Luton debut on 12 August 2025 in an EFL Cup defeat against Coventry City. In his first season at the club, he made 36 appearances, scoring 5 goals, earning praise from manager Jack Wilshere.

Richards started for Luton Town in the 2026 EFL Trophy final, in which the team achieved a 3–1 win over Stockport County.

== Career statistics ==
As of match played 21 November 2026

Appearances and goals by club, season and competition
| Club | Season | League | | | FA Cup | | EFL Cup | | Other | | Total | |
| Club | Season | Division | Apps | Goals | Apps | Goals | Apps | Goals | Apps | Goals | Apps | Goals |
|---|---|---|---|---|---|---|---|---|---|---|---|---|
| Exeter City | 2023–24 | League One | 6 | 0 | 1 | 0 | 2 | 0 | 3 (Note: Appearance(s) in EFL Trophy) | 0 | 12 | 0 |
| Exeter City | 2024–25 | League One | 13 | 1 | 3 | 0 | 0 | 0 | 4 | 1 | 20 | 2 |
| Exeter City | Total | | 19 | 1 | 4 | 0 | 2 | 0 | 7 | 1 | 32 | 2 |
| Luton Town | 2025–26 | League One | 27 | 5 | 2 | 0 | 1 | 0 | 6 | 0 | 36 | 5 |
| Luton Town | 2026–27 | League One | 15 | 1 | 1 | 0 | 2 | 0 | 3 | 0 | 21 | 1 |
| Luton Town | Total | | 42 | 6 | 3 | 0 | 3 | 0 | 9 | 0 | 57 | 6 |
| Career total | | | 61 | 7 | 7 | 0 | 5 | 0 | 16 | 1 | 89 | 8 |

== Honours ==
Luton Town

- EFL Trophy: 2025–26

Individual

- EFL League One Apprentice of the Year: 2024–25
- Luton Town Young Player of the Season: 2025–26
