= Hakeem Odoffin =

English footballer (born 1998)

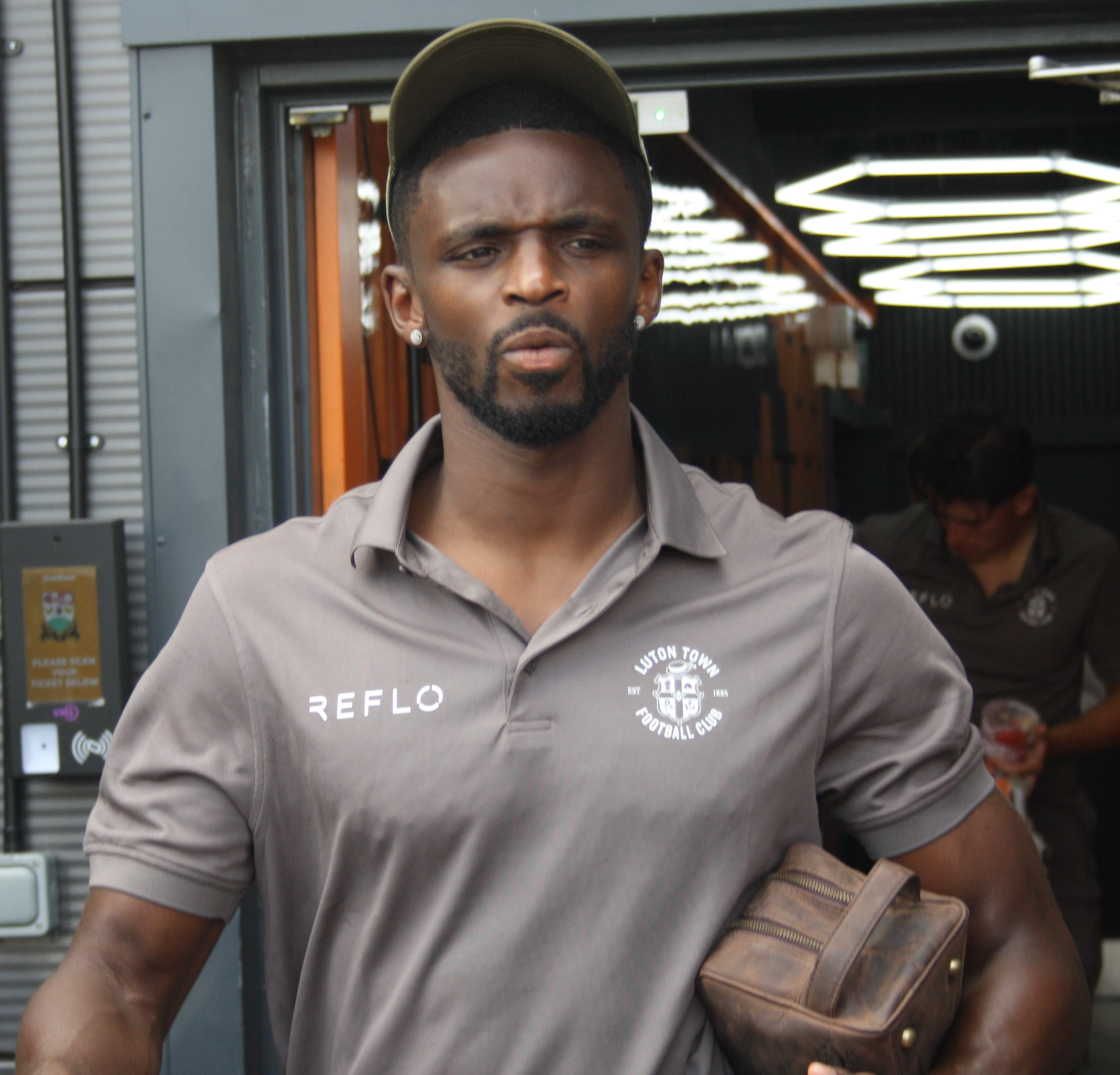
- Odoffin in 2026 with Luton Town

Personal information
- Full name: Hakeem Ademola Okonlawan Odoffin
- Date of birth: 13 April 1998 (age 28)
- Place of birth: Barnet, England
- Height: 6 ft 3 in (1.91 m)
- Positions: Centre-back; right-back; midfielder

Team information
- Current team: Luton Town
- Number: 2

Youth career
- –2012: Tottenham Hotspur
- 2012–2014: Reading
- 2014–2015: Barnet

Senior career*
Years	Team	Apps	(Gls)
2014–2016	Barnet	1	(0)
2016–2018	Wolverhampton Wanderers	0	(0)
2016–2017	→ Eastleigh (loan)	20	(0)
2018–2019	Northampton Town	12	(0)
2019–2020	Livingston	20	(0)
2020–2021	Hamilton Academical	37	(3)
2021–2025	Rotherham United	116	(13)
2025–	Luton Town	26	(2)
- * Club domestic league appearances and goals as of 21:12, 20 October 2026 (UTC)

Hakeem Ademola Okonlawan Odoffin (born 13 April 1998) is an English professional footballer who plays as a defender for EFL League One club Luton Town.

Starting his senior career at his hometown club Barnet, Odoffin went on to play for Wolverhampton Wanderers, Eastleigh, Northampton Town, Livingston, Hamilton Academical and Rotherham United before joining Luton in 2025.

== Early life ==
Hakeem Ademola Okonlawan Odoffin was born on 13 April 1998 in the London Borough of Barnet, England to parents of Nigerian descent.

As a child, he spent time at the Tottenham Hotspur academy, before joining Reading in 2012. He was released after two years at the club.

== Career ==
=== Barnet ===
Odoffin joined Barnet on a two-year scholarship in 2014. He made his debut for the club in a Herts Senior Cup match against St. Margaretsbury on 26 November 2014.

The following season he made his professional debut for Barnet on 5 December 2015, starting in an FA Cup second round tie at home to Newport County. Odoffin made two senior appearances for the Bees.

=== Wolverhampton Wanderers and Eastleigh ===
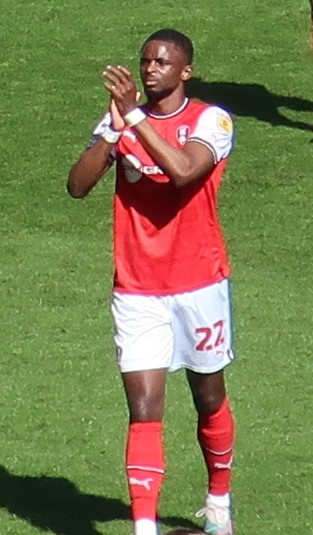
Odoffin playing for Rotherham United

Odoffin joined Wolverhampton Wanderers in January 2016 for an undisclosed fee. He joined Eastleigh on loan in December 2016 where he was sent off on his debut against Southport. He went on to make 21 appearances for Eastleigh.

He was released by Wolves at the end of the 2017–18 season.

=== Northampton Town ===
Odoffin joined Northampton Town on a two-year deal in July 2018, however left the club the following January due to limited first-team opportunities. He started 10 times for the club.

=== Livingston ===
On 30 January 2019, Odoffin signed for Scottish Premiership club Livingston. He left the club at the end of the following season, having made 20 appearances for the club.

=== Hamilton Academical ===
On 31 July 2020, Odoffin moved to fellow Scottish Premiership side Hamilton Academical for an undisclosed fee, signing a one-year contract. He was used in both defence and midfield by manager Brian Rice, and reportedly had made more interceptions than any other under-23 player in Europe. In March 2021, he signed a one-year contract extension with Hamilton.

=== Rotherham United ===
In August 2021, Odoffin returned to England - signing a three-year deal with EFL League One club Rotherham United. He made his debut in the first game of the 2021–22 season against Plymouth Argyle on 7 August 2021, coming on as a second-half substitute.

In the 2024–25 season, Odoffin often captained the side in the absence of Jonson Clarke-Harris.

On 19 May 2025, Rotherham United announced that Odoffin had left the club after rejecting a new deal. He made 139 appearances in his 4 years at the club.

=== Luton Town ===
On 10 July 2025, he joined Luton Town as a free agent. After the club discovered a non-musculoskeletal issue during his medical, he was not available for selection until he made his debut as a substitute on 25 October 2025 against former club Northampton Town.

Odoffin played in the 2026 EFL Trophy final, in which Luton beat Stockport County 3–1 to win the competition.

== Career statistics ==
As of match played 20 October 2026

Appearances and goals by club, season and competition
Club	Season	League			National Cup (Note: Includes FA Cup and Scottish Cup)		League Cup (Note: Includes EFL Cup and Scottish League Cup)		Other		Total	
Club	Season	Division	Apps	Goals	Apps	Goals	Apps	Goals	Apps	Goals	Apps	Goals
Barnet	2014–15	Conference Premier	0	0	0	0	—		1 (Note: Appearance in Herts Senior Cup)	0	1	0
Barnet	2015–16	League Two	1	0	1	0	0	0	0	0	2	0
Barnet	Total		1	0	1	0	0	0	1	0	3	0
Wolverhampton Wanderers	2016–17	Championship	0	0	0	0	0	0	—		0	0
Wolverhampton Wanderers	2017–18	Championship	0	0	0	0	0	0	—		0	0
Wolverhampton Wanderers	Total		0	0	0	0	0	0	—		0	0
Eastleigh (loan)	2016–17	National League	20	0	1	0	—		0	0	21	0
Northampton Town	2018–19	League Two	12	0	1	0	0	0	3 (Note: Appearance(s) in the EFL Trophy)	0	16	0
Livingston	2018–19	Scottish Premiership	13	0	0	0	0	0	—		13	0
Livingston	2019–20	Scottish Premiership	7	0	0	0	0	0	—		7	0
Livingston	Total		20	0	0	0	0	0	—		20	0
Hamilton Academical	2020–21	Scottish Premiership	37	3	1	0	3	1	—		41	4
Hamilton Academical	2021–22	Scottish Championship	0	0	0	0	1	0	—		1	0
Hamilton Academical	Total		37	3	1	0	4	1	—		42	4
Rotherham United	2021–22	League One	11	0	3	0	1	0	7	1	22	1
Rotherham United	2022–23	Championship	23	4	1	0	1	0	—		26	4
Rotherham United	2023–24	Championship	38	4	1	0	1	0	—		40	4
Rotherham United	2024–25	League One	44	5	1	0	2	1	5	1	52	7
Rotherham United	Total		116	13	6	0	5	1	12	2	139	16
Luton Town	2025–26	League One	17	2	1	0	0	0	3	0	21	2
Luton Town	2026–27	League One	9	0	0	0	2	0	2	0	13	0
Luton Town	Total		26	2	1	0	2	0	5	0	34	2
Career total			232	18	11	0	11	2	21	2	275	22

== Honours ==
Luton Town

- EFL Trophy: 2025–26
