= Jordan Clark (English footballer) =

English footballer (born 1993)

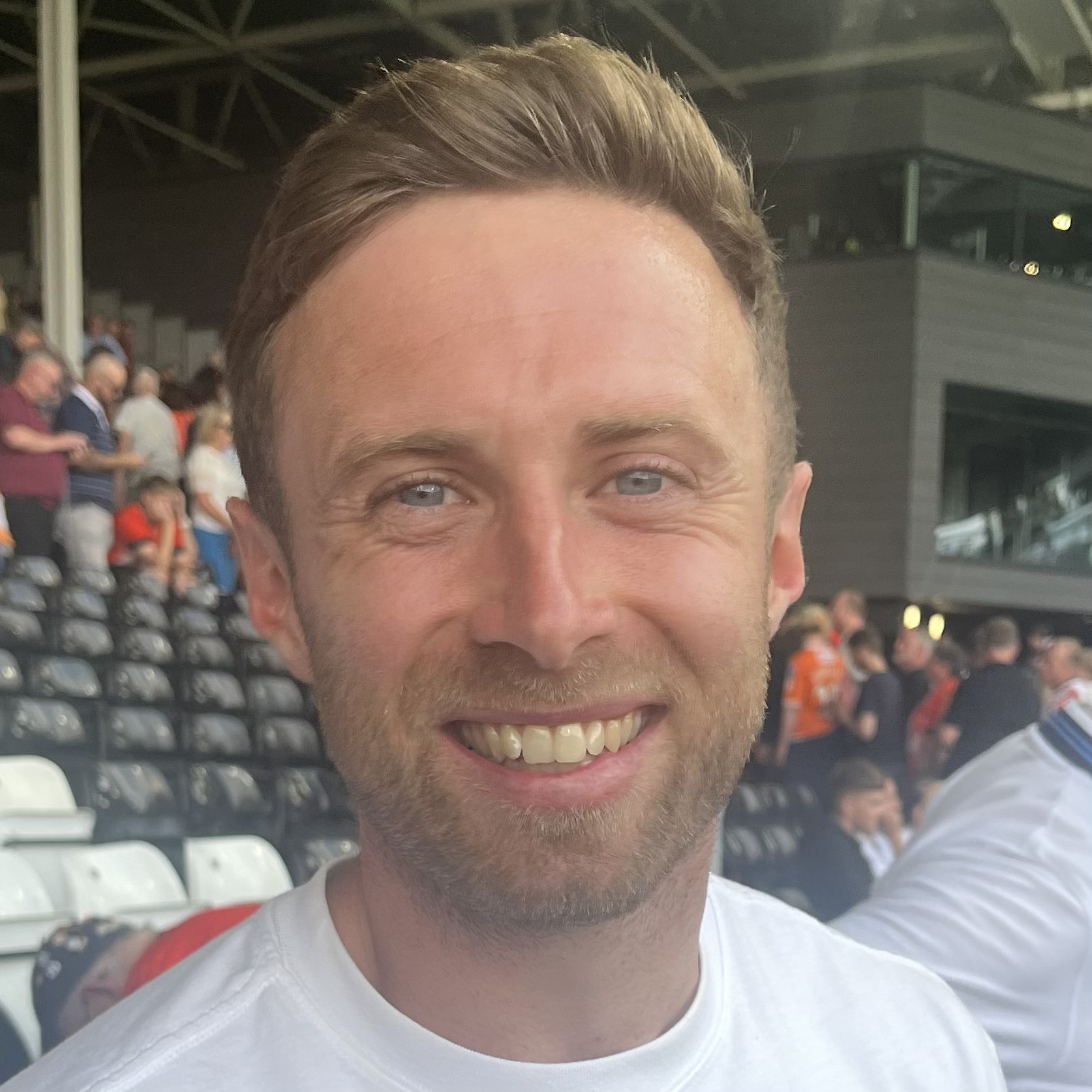
- Clark in 2023

Personal information
- Full name: Jordan Charles Clark
- Date of birth: 22 September 1993 (age 33)
- Place of birth: Hoyland, England
- Height: 1.83 m (6 ft 0 in)
- Position: Midfielder

Team information
- Current team: Luton Town
- Number: 18

Youth career
- –2011: Barnsley

Senior career*
Years	Team	Apps	(Gls)
2011–2014	Barnsley	6	(0)
2013	→ Chesterfield (loan)	2	(0)
2013	→ Scunthorpe United (loan)	1	(0)
2014	→ Hyde (loan)	16	(1)
2014–2016	Shrewsbury Town	47	(5)
2016–2020	Accrington Stanley	162	(20)
2020–	Luton Town	207	(27)
- * Club domestic league appearances and goals as of 19:01, 21 November 2026 (UTC)

Jordan Charles Clark (born 22 September 1993) is an English professional footballer who plays as a midfielder for EFL League One club Luton Town.

== Career ==
=== Barnsley ===
Clark won Barnsley's 'Most Promising Academy Player' award for the 2009–10 season, and signed a scholarship deal with the club in July 2010. He signed his first professional contract in March 2011, alongside Danny Rose. He made his senior debut for Barnsley on 12 April 2011, in a 1–0 defeat at home to Queens Park Rangers. On 11 September 2012, Clark signed a contract extension with the club, keeping him at Barnsley until 2014.

On 22 February 2013, Clark was loaned out to Chesterfield on an initial one-month deal. He made his Chesterfield debut the following day, coming on as an 80th-minute substitute for Neal Trotman, in a 1–0 loss against Gillingham. Clark made one more appearance, playing 90 minutes, in a 0–0 draw against Aldershot Town before being recalled by Barnsley on 26 March 2013.

On 2 August 2013, Clark went on loan again to Scunthorpe United. He made his debut the next day, coming on as a late substitute for Andy Welsh, in a 2–0 win over Mansfield Town, returning to his parent club on 11 September 2013.

In February 2014 he joined Hyde on another loan deal, making his Hyde debut as a second-half substitute for David Poole, in a 4–3 loss against Lincoln City. On 22 February 2014, Clark scored his first professional career goal, in a 2–2 draw against Aldershot Town.

Clark was released by Barnsley at the end of the 2013–14 season.

=== Shrewsbury Town ===
Following a trial spell, Clark went on to join League Two side Shrewsbury Town on 17 July 2014, re-uniting with new Shrewsbury manager Micky Mellon who had previously been assistant, and later caretaker-manager at Barnsley.

Clark made his Shrewsbury Town debut in a 2–2 draw against Wimbledon on the opening day of the season. On 30 August 2014, Clark scored his first goals for the club, both in a 2–0 win over Luton Town. His third goal of the season, against Bury, described as a "superb angled volley", was awarded the winner of the club's Goal of the Month competition for October 2014.

Clark found his playing role reduced in the second half of the season, mostly used as a substitute. However, he contributed two assists, in a 4–0 win over Exeter City on 11 April 2015, as Shrewsbury closed in on promotion to League One. At the end of the season, Clark signed a one-year contract extension.

On 5 September 2015, he scored a last-minute winning goal in a 2–1 win at former club Barnsley, Town's first win of the League One season. It was announced Clark was to be released by the club in May 2016.

=== Accrington Stanley ===
After leaving Shrewsbury, he signed for Accrington Stanley in August 2016. He scored his first goal for Accrington in an EFL Trophy tie against Chesterfield on 4 October 2016.

He was offered a new contract by the club at the end of the 2019–20 season.

=== Luton Town ===
On 5 August 2020 Clark signed for Luton Town on a free transfer after his Accrington contract expired.

On 27 May 2023, he scored the goal in regular time and a penalty in the penalty shoot-out for Luton in the EFL Championship play-off final against Coventry City, which ended 1–1 after extra time. Luton won on penalties, ensuring they would play in the Premier League in the 2023–24 season.

On 6 April 2024, Clark scored his first Premier League goal in a 2–1 win over Bournemouth.

Despite a disappointing season that resulted in a second consecutive relegation, Clark was named Player of the Season for the 2024–25 season, also winning Players' Player of the Season and Goal of the Season.

Clark was in the Luton Town squad which achieved a 3–1 win against Stockport County in the 2026 EFL Trophy final.

On 3 June 2026, it was announced that Clark had signed a new long-term contract with the club.

== Career statistics ==
As of match played 21 November 2026

Appearances and goals by club, season and competition
Club	Season	League			FA Cup		League Cup		Other		Total	
Club	Season	Division	Apps	Goals	Apps	Goals	Apps	Goals	Apps	Goals	Apps	Goals
Barnsley	2010–11	Championship	4	0	0	0	0	0	—		4	0
Barnsley	2011–12	Championship	2	0	0	0	0	0	—		2	0
Barnsley	2012–13	Championship	0	0	0	0	1	0	—		1	0
Barnsley	2013–14	Championship	0	0	0	0	—		—		0	0
Barnsley	Total		6	0	0	0	1	0	—		7	0
Chesterfield (loan)	2012–13	League Two	2	0	—		—		—		2	0
Scunthorpe United (loan)	2013–14	League Two	1	0	—		0	0	0	0	1	0
Hyde (loan)	2013–14	Conference Premier	16	1	—		—		—		16	1
Shrewsbury Town	2014–15	League Two	27	3	2	0	3	0	1 (Note: Appearance(s) in Football League Trophy/EFL Trophy)	0	33	3
Shrewsbury Town	2015–16	League One	20	2	4	0	0	0	2	0	26	2
Shrewsbury Town	Total		47	5	6	0	3	0	3	0	59	5
Accrington Stanley	2016–17	League Two	42	1	4	1	2	0	2	1	50	3
Accrington Stanley	2017–18	League Two	43	8	1	0	2	1	2	0	48	9
Accrington Stanley	2018–19	League One	43	5	4	1	1	0	5	3	53	9
Accrington Stanley	2019–20	League One	34	6	1	0	1	0	4	2	40	8
Accrington Stanley	Total		162	20	10	2	6	1	13	6	191	29
Luton Town	2020–21	Championship	34	1	2	1	3	1	—		39	3
Luton Town	2021–22	Championship	25	2	1	0	0	0	2 (Note: Appearances in Championship play-offs)	0	28	2
Luton Town	2022–23	Championship	38	2	3	1	0	0	3	1	44	4
Luton Town	2023–24	Premier League	23	1	3	2	0	0	—		26	3
Luton Town	2024–25	Championship	40	6	1	0	1	0	—		42	6
Luton Town	2025–26	League One	37	12	0	0	0	0	4	1	41	13
Luton Town	2026–27	League One	10	3	1	1	1	0	3	4	15	8
Luton Town	Total		207	27	11	5	5	1	12	6	235	39
Career total			441	53	27	7	15	2	28	12	511	74

== Honours ==
Shrewsbury Town

- Football League Two second-place promotion: 2014–15

Accrington Stanley

- EFL League Two: 2017–18

Luton Town

- EFL Championship play-offs: 2023
- EFL Trophy: 2025–26

Individual

- Accrington Stanley Player of the Season: 2018–19
- Luton Town Player of the Season: 2024–25, 2025–26
