= Josh Phillips (footballer) =

English footballer (born 2005)

Personal information
- Full name: Joshua Phillips
- Date of birth: 17 August 2005 (age 21)
- Place of birth: London, England
- Position: Forward

Team information
- Current team: Sholing

Youth career
- Fulham
- 2023–2024: Luton Town

Senior career*
Years	Team	Apps	(Gls)
2024–2026	Luton Town	1	(0)
2024	→ Bath City (loan)	5	(0)
2025	→ Torquay United (loan)	4	(0)
2025–2026	→ Bedford Town (loan)	28	(2)
2026–	Sholing	0	(0)
- * Club domestic league appearances and goals as of 22:32, 9 October 2026 (UTC)

Joshua Phillips (born 17 August 2005) is an English footballer who plays as a forward for Southern League Premier Division South club Sholing.

== Career ==
Born in London, Phillips began his career with the Fulham Academy before joining Luton Town in summer 2023 following a successful trial.

On 30 October 2024, Phillips joined National League South side Bath City on an initial one-month loan deal. Following his return from the loan, he began training with the Luton Town first-team, impressing manager Rob Edwards enough to be given a first-team debut as a late substitute in a 1–0 defeat to Bristol City on 26 December 2024.

On 22 August 2025, Phillips returned to the National League South, joining Torquay United on a one-month loan deal. In October 2025, he joined National League North side Bedford Town on a further one-month loan.

Phillips was released by Luton Town at the end of the 2025–26 season.

On 9 October 2026, Phillips joined Southern League Premier Division South side Sholing.

== Career statistics ==
As of match played 11 April 2026

Appearances and goals by club, season and competition
Club	Season	League			FA Cup		League Cup		Other		Total	
Club	Season	Division	Apps	Goals	Apps	Goals	Apps	Goals	Apps	Goals	Apps	Goals
Luton Town	2024–25	Championship	1	0	0	0	0	0	—		1	0
Luton Town	2025–26	League One	0	0	0	0	1	0	1 (Note: Appearance(s) in EFL Trophy)	0	2	0
Luton Town	Total		1	0	0	0	1	0	1	0	3	0
Bath City (loan)	2024–25	National League South	5	0	0	0	—		1 (Note: Appearance(s) in FA Trophy)	0	6	0
Torquay United (loan)	2025–26	National League South	4	0	0	0	—		0	0	4	0
Bedford Town (loan)	2025–26	National League North	28	2	0	0	—		0	0	28	2
Sholing	2026–27	Southern League Premier Division South	0	0	0	0	—		0	0	0	0
Career total			38	2	0	0	1	0	2	0	41	2
