= Shayden Morris =

English footballer (born 2002)

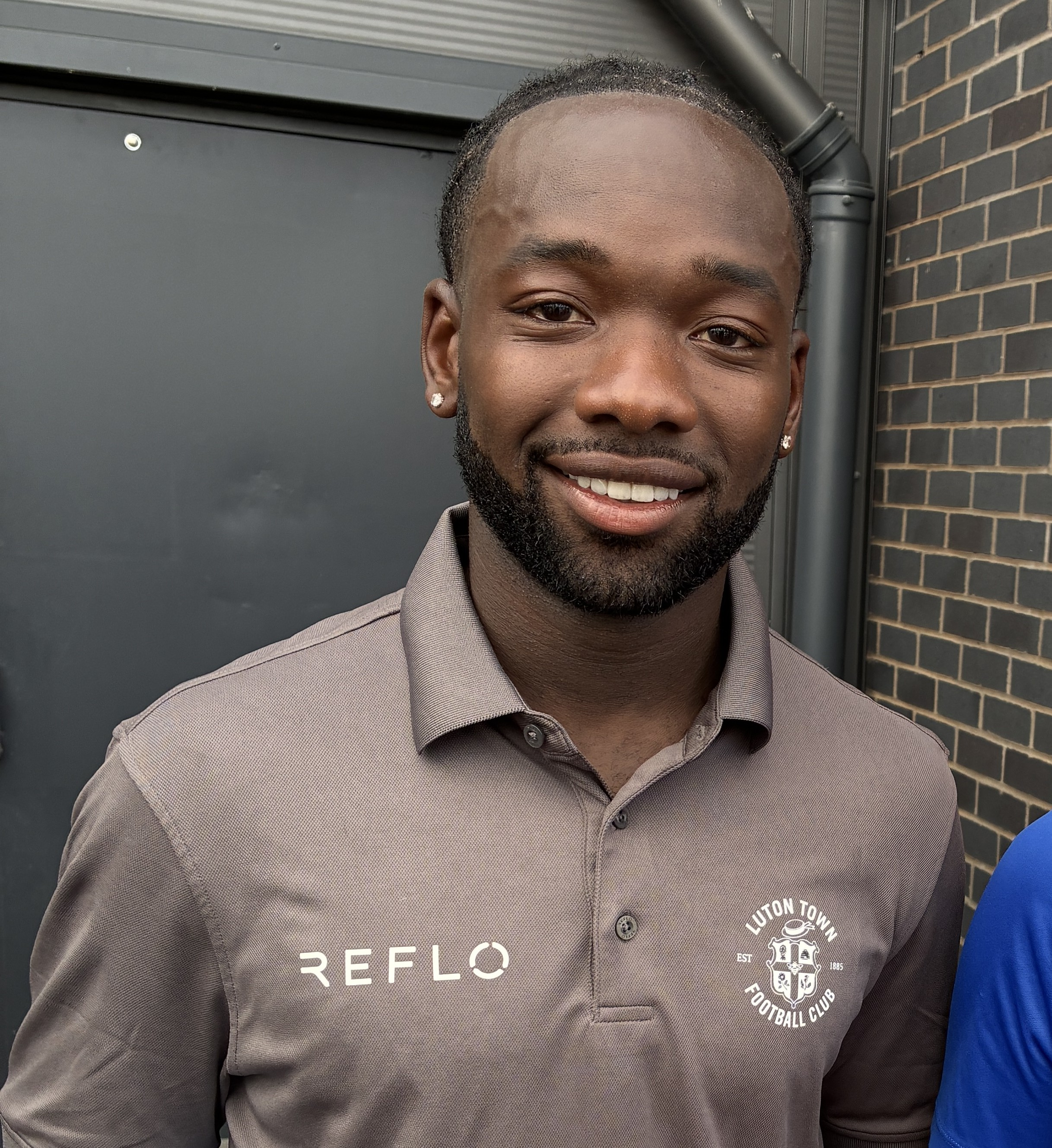
- Morris in 2026.

Personal information
- Full name: Shayden Jermaine Morris
- Date of birth: 30 March 2002 (age 24)
- Place of birth: Newham, England
- Height: 6 ft 0 in (1.83 m)
- Position: Right winger

Team information
- Current team: Luton Town
- Number: 14

Youth career
- –2018: Southend United
- 2018–2019: Fleetwood Town

Senior career*
Years	Team	Apps	(Gls)
2019–2022	Fleetwood Town	32	(2)
2022–2025	Aberdeen	65	(3)
2025–	Luton Town	31	(5)
- * Club domestic league appearances and goals as of 16:19, 2 May 2026 (UTC)

Shayden Jermaine Morris (born 30 March 2002) is an English professional footballer who plays as a right winger for EFL League One club Luton Town.

== Early life and education ==
Morris was born in Newham and attended Brampton Manor Academy in East Ham.

== Career ==
=== Fleetwood Town ===
After playing youth football for Southend United, Morris joined Fleetwood Town's academy in 2018 on a two-year scholarship. He made his senior debut for Fleetwood Town as a substitute in their 1–1 EFL Trophy draw with Liverpool U21 on 25 September 2019. On 16 July 2020, Morris signed his first professional contract – a one-year contract with the option of a further year. On 15 January 2021, he signed a new contract lasting until summer 2023. He made his league debut for the club on 16 January 2021 in a 1–0 League One defeat at home to Portsmouth. Morris scored his first professional goal in a 3–2 home win over Cheltenham Town on 21 August 2021.

=== Aberdeen ===
Morris moved to Scottish club Aberdeen for an undisclosed fee in August 2022. He made his debut for the club on 13 August 2022, in a 3–2 defeat against Motherwell in the Scottish Premiership. On 20 July 2024, he scored his first goal for the club in a 4–0 win against East Kilbride in the Scottish League Cup. On 24 May 2025, he won the Scottish Cup with Aberdeen, beating Celtic on penalties. He won Aberdeen's Player of the Year award for the 2024–25 season, where he was primarily featured as an impact substitute, playing all games in the Scottish Premiership but starting only 11 of those games.

=== Luton Town ===
On 1 September 2025, Morris signed for League One club Luton Town for an undisclosed fee. He scored on his debut as a substitute the following day, in a 4–1 win against Barnet. He was a substitute in the 2026 EFL Trophy final, in which Luton achieved a 3–1 win against Stockport County.

== Career statistics ==
As of match played 8 August 2026

Appearances and goals by club, season and competition
Club	Season	League			National Cup (Note: Includes FA Cup, Scottish Cup)		League Cup (Note: Includes EFL Cup, Scottish League Cup)		Other		Total	
Club	Season	Division	Apps	Goals	Apps	Goals	Apps	Goals	Apps	Goals	Apps	Goals
Fleetwood Town	2019–20	EFL League One	0	0	0	0	0	0	1 (Note: Appearances in EFL Trophy)	0	1	0
Fleetwood Town	2020–21	EFL League One	5	0	0	0	0	0	4	0	9	0
Fleetwood Town	2021–22	EFL League One	26	2	1	0	1	0	2	0	30	2
Fleetwood Town	2022–23	EFL League One	1	0	0	0	0	0	0	0	1	0
Fleetwood Town	Total		32	2	1	0	1	0	7	0	41	2
Aberdeen	2022–23	Scottish Premiership	13	0	0	0	2	0	—		15	0
Aberdeen	2023–24	Scottish Premiership	12	0	2	0	2	0	3 (Note: Two appearances in the UEFA Europa League, one appearance in the UEFA Conference League)	0	19	0
Aberdeen	2024–25	Scottish Premiership	38	3	5	1	6	1	—		49	5
Aberdeen	2025–26	Scottish Premiership	2	0	0	0	1	0	0	0	3	0
Aberdeen	Total		65	3	7	1	11	1	3	0	86	5
Luton Town	2025–26	EFL League One	31	5	1	0	0	0	7	2	39	7
Luton Town	2026–27	EFL League One	0	0	0	0	1	0	0	0	1	0
Luton Town	Total		31	5	1	0	1	0	7	2	40	7
Career total			128	10	9	1	13	1	17	2	167	14

== Honours ==
Aberdeen

- Scottish Cup: 2024–25

Luton Town

- EFL Trophy: 2025–26
