= Christ Makosso =

Congolese footballer (born 2004)

Personal information
- Full name: Christ Melik Makosso
- Date of birth: 9 May 2004 (age 22)
- Place of birth: Brazzaville, Congo
- Height: 1.92 m (6 ft 4 in)
- Position: Defender

Team information
- Current team: Auxerre
- Number: 15

Youth career
- Ajax Moungali

Senior career*
Years	Team	Apps	(Gls)
2021–2023	CARA Brazzaville		
2023–2024	Sochaux B	8	(0)
2023–2024	Sochaux	13	(0)
2024–2025	RWDM	23	(1)
2025–2026	Luton Town	24	(0)
2026	→ Oxford United (loan)	6	(0)
2026–	Auxerre	2	(0)

International career^{‡}
2022–	Congo	6	(0)
- * Club domestic league appearances and goals as of 11:26, 11 September 2026 (UTC) ‡ National team caps and goals as of 09:48, 26 June 2026 (UTC)

Christ Melik Makosso (born 9 May 2004) is a Congolese professional footballer who plays as a defender for Ligue 1 club Auxerre and the Congo national team.

== Club career ==
=== Early career ===
Born in Brazzaville, Makosso spent his early career in the Congo with Ajax de Moungali and CARA Brazzaville.

=== Sochaux ===
On 17 March 2023, Makosso joined French Ligue 2 club Sochaux. Initially playing for their reserve team in the Championnat National 3 and Under-19's team, he made his first-team debut for the club on 6 May 2023 as a substitute against Amiens. He signed his first professional contract on 16 May – a three-year deal with the club.

=== RWDM ===
On 25 January 2024, Makosso joined Belgian Pro League side RWDM on a four-year contract. He made 10 appearances in his first season at the club, ending with a relegation to the Challenger Pro League. He went on to make 13 further appearances in the second-tier, as well as scoring his first career goal.

=== Luton Town ===
In January 2025, Makosso was signed by EFL Championship club Luton Town. He made his debut for the club on 23 February 2025, in a 2–0 derby defeat against Watford. Although the 2024–25 season ended in disappointment as the club suffered a second consecutive relegation, Makosso's impact following his arrival saw him named both Young Player of the Season and Signing of the Season at the club's awards night.

In January 2026, Makosso joined Championship club Oxford United on loan until the end of the season, joining up with his former Luton Town manager Matt Bloomfield.

=== Auxerre ===
In July 2026 he returned to France, siging with Auxerre.

== International career ==
After playing for, and captaining, the country's youth teams, Makosso made his international debut for Congo on 4 September 2022 in an African Nations Championship second round qualifier against Central African Republic, ending with a 1–0 win.

== Career statistics ==
As of match played 4 September 2026

Appearances and goals by club, season and competition
Club	Season	League			National cup (Note: Includes Coupe de France, Belgian Cup, FA Cup)		League cup (Note: Includes EFL Cup)		Other		Total	
Club	Season	Division	Apps	Goals	Apps	Goals	Apps	Goals	Apps	Goals	Apps	Goals
Sochaux B	2022–23	Championnat National 3	6	0	—		—		—		6	0
Sochaux B	2023–24	Championnat National 3	2	0	—		—		—		2	0
Sochaux B	Total		8	0	0	0	0	0	0	0	8	0
Sochaux	2022–23	Ligue 2	5	0	0	0	—		—		5	0
Sochaux	2023–24	Championnat National	8	0	2	0	—		—		10	0
Sochaux	Total		13	0	2	0	0	0	0	0	15	0
RWDM	2023–24	Belgian Pro League	10	0	0	0	—		—		10	0
RWDM	2024–25	Challenger Pro League	13	1	0	0	—		—		13	1
RWDM	Total		23	1	0	0	0	0	0	0	23	1
Luton Town	2024–25	EFL Championship	13	0	0	0	0	0	—		13	0
Luton Town	2025–26	EFL League One	11	0	0	0	0	0	4 (Note: Appearances in EFL Trophy)	0	15	0
Luton Town	Total		24	0	0	0	0	0	4	0	28	0
Oxford United (loan)	2025–26	EFL Championship	6	0	1	0	0	0	—		7	0
Auxerre	2026–27	Ligue 1	2	0	0	0	—		—		2	0
Career total			76	1	3	0	0	0	4	0	83	1

== Honours ==
Individual

- Luton Town Young Player of the Season: 2024–25
