= 2025–26 Luton Town F.C. season =

English football club season

Luton Town
2025–26 season
- Owner: Luton Town Football Club 2020 Ltd
- Chairman: David Wilkinson
- Manager: Matt Bloomfield (until 6 October); Jack Wilshere (from 13 October)
- Stadium: Kenilworth Road
- EFL League One: 7th
- FA Cup: Second round
- EFL Cup: First round
- EFL Trophy: Winners
- Top goalscorer: League: Jordan Clark (12); All: Jordan Clark (13)
- Highest home attendance: 11,801 v Plymouth Argyle (13 Sept 2025, League One)
- Lowest home attendance: 2,212 v Brighton & Hove Albion U21 (28 Oct 2025, EFL Trophy)
- Average home league attendance: 11,039
- Biggest win: 4–0 v Wycombe Wanderers (Home, 26 Dec 2025, League One)
- Biggest defeat: 5–0 v Barnsley (Away, 22 Nov 2025, League One)
Home colours	Away colours	Third colours

The 2025–26 season was the 140th season in the history of Luton Town Football Club and their first season back in League One since the 2018–19 season following successive relegations from the Premier League two years ago and the EFL Championship the previous season. In addition to the domestic league, the club also participated in the FA Cup, the EFL Cup, and the EFL Trophy – the latter of which they won.

== Managerial changes ==
On 6 October, the club parted company with manager Matt Bloomfield after 33 games in charge and a win ratio of 36.36%. A week later, Jack Wilshere was appointed as the new manager.

Managerial record in the 2025–26 season
Manager	From	To	Record					Ref.
Manager	From	To	P	W	D	L	Win %	Ref.
(England) Matt Bloomfield	Start of season	6 October 2025	13	6	1	6	46.2	
(Wales) Alex Lawless (caretaker)	6 October 2025	13 October 2025	1	0	0	1	0.0	
(England) Jack Wilshere	13 October 2025	End of season	43	22	11	10	51.2	
Total			57	28	12	17	49.1	

== Transfers and contracts ==
=== In ===
Date	Pos.	No.	Player	From	Fee	Ref.
1 July 2025 (Note: The transfer was announced on 10 June, and would become official on 1 July once his contract at Bristol City had expired)	CB	3	(Scotland) Kal Naismith	(England) Bristol City	Free	
1 July 2025 (Note: The transfer was announced on 11 June, and would become official on 1 July once his contract at Millwall had expired)	CM	23	(Northern Ireland) George Saville	(England) Millwall	Free	
4 July 2025	CM	27	(England) Jake Richards	(England) Exeter City	Compensation	
10 July 2025	CDM	16	(England) Hakeem Odoffin	(England) Rotherham United	Free	
10 July 2025	CF	21	(Bermuda) Nahki Wells	(England) Bristol City	Free	
19 July 2025	GK	24	(Republic of Ireland) Josh Keeley	(England) Tottenham Hotspur	£1,000,000	
1 August 2025	LB	33	(England) Cohen Bramall	(England) Portsmouth	Free	
1 August 2025	CF	9	(England) Jerry Yates	(Wales) Swansea City	Undisclosed	
1 September 2025	LM	35	(England) Ethon Archer	(England) Cheltenham Town	Undisclosed	
1 September 2025	CF	31	(England) Joe Gbodé	(England) Gillingham	£300,000	
1 September 2025	RW	14	(England) Shayden Morris	(Scotland) Aberdeen	Undisclosed	
31 January 2026	CF	22	(Jamaica) Devante Cole	(England) Port Vale	Undisclosed	
2 February 2026	CM	4	(Norway) Sverre Sandal	(Norway) KFUM Oslo	Undisclosed	
6 February 2026	CF	30	(England) Gideon Kodua	(England) West Ham United	£1,000,000	

=== Out ===
Date	Pos.	No.	Player	To	Fee	Ref.
26 June 2025	CF	9	(England) Carlton Morris	(England) Derby County	Undisclosed	
27 June 2025	RB	27	(Japan) Daiki Hashioka	(Czech Republic) Slavia Prague	Undisclosed	
1 July 2025	GK	24	(Belgium) Thomas Kaminski	(England) Charlton Athletic	Undisclosed	
4 July 2025	CF	—	(Canada) Aribim Pepple	(England) Plymouth Argyle	Undisclosed	
5 July 2025	CAM	8	(Norway) Thelo Aasgaard	(Scotland) Rangers	£3,500,000	
9 July 2025	CB	16	(England) Reece Burke	(England) Charlton Athletic	Undisclosed	
22 July 2025	GK	–	(England) Jack Walton	(England) Preston North End	Undisclosed	
28 July 2025	LWB	45	(England) Alfie Doughty	(England) Millwall	Undisclosed	
29 August 2025	CAM	14	(Curaçao) Tahith Chong	(England) Sheffield United	Undisclosed	
1 September 2025	CB	6	(Republic of Ireland) Mark McGuinness	(England) Sheffield United	Undisclosed	
14 January 2026	CF	—	(Northern Ireland) Sam Anderson	(Northern Ireland) Dungannon Swifts	Undisclosed	
1 February 2026	CM	22	(Spain) Lamine Fanne	(Italy) Venezia	Undisclosed	

=== Loans in ===
Date	Pos.	No.	Player	From	Date until	Ref.
10 July 2025	CB	17	(Netherlands) Nigel Lonwijk	(England) Wolverhampton Wanderers	31 May 2026	
22 July 2025	CF	30	(England) Gideon Kodua	(England) West Ham United	6 February 2026 (Note: On 6 February, the club triggered the option to make Kodua's loan move permanent)	
1 September 2025	CF	12	(Iraq) Ali Al-Hamadi	(England) Ipswich Town	31 May 2026 (Note: Obiligation to buy if certain criteria's are met)	
9 January 2026	LW	32	(Scotland) Emilio Lawrence	(England) Manchester City	31 May 2026	
22 January 2026	CAM	54	(Jamaica) Kasey Palmer	(England) Hull City	31 May 2026	
2 February 2026	CM	6	(Netherlands) Davy van den Berg	(Netherlands) Utrecht	31 May 2026 (Note: Includes a conditional obligation to buy)	

=== Loans out ===
Date	Pos.	No.	Player	To	Date until	Ref.
23 July 2025	CF	41	(England) Taylan Harris	(England) Tranmere Rovers	6 January 2026	
29 July 2025	CM	34	(England) Jayden Luker	(England) Notts County	31 May 2026	
30 July 2025	GK	—	(England) Liam Coyne	(England) Biggleswade	27 August 2025	
31 July 2025	CF	—	(England) Oliver Lynch	(England) Tamworth	31 May 2026 (Note: On 2 January, Lynch's loan at Tamworth was extended until the end of the season)	
8 August 2025	CM	—	(Rwanda) Claude Kayibanda	(England) Bedford Town	5 September 2025	
22 August 2025	CF	39	(England) Josh Phillips	(England) Torquay United	19 September 2025	
29 August 2025	CF	—	(England) Tate Xavier-Jones	(Scotland) Airdrieonians	1 January 2026	
1 September 2025	CF	—	(Northern Ireland) Sam Anderson	(Northern Ireland) Dungannon Swifts	1 January 2026	
1 September 2025	LM	—	(England) Ethon Archer	(England) Cheltenham Town	1 January 2026	
1 September 2025	CB	29	(England) Tom Holmes	(England) Rotherham United	12 January 2026 (Note: On 12 January, Holmes' initial season-long loan at Rotherham United was terminated)	
1 September 2025	CF	10	(England) Cauley Woodrow	(England) Wycombe Wanderers	31 May 2026	
2 October 2025	CF	39	(England) Josh Phillips	(England) Bedford Town	31 May 2026 (Note: On 4 November, Phillips' loan at Bedford was extended until January. Then on 9 January it was extended further for another month. Then on 11 February it was extended once again until the end of the season)	
8 November 2025	GK	—	(Australia) Henry Blackledge	(England) Cheshunt	6 December 2025	
6 December 2025	GK	—	(Australia) Henry Blackledge	(England) Gosport Borough	27 February 2026 (Note: On 27 February, Blackledge's loan was terminated after sustaining an injury. He was replaced by Lucas Thomas)	
20 December 2025	GK	—	(England) Liam Coyne	(England) Biggleswade	17 January 2026	
2 January 2026	CM	48	(England) Jack Lorentzen-Jones	(England) Hemel Hempstead Town	31 May 2026 (Note: On 2 February, Lorentzen-Jones' loan at Hemel Hempstead Town was extended until the end of the season)	
6 January 2026	CF	20	(Norway) Lasse Nordås	(Netherlands) Heerenveen	31 May 2026	
8 January 2026	CF	—	(England) Jamie Odegah	(England) Chelmsford City	31 May 2026 (Note: On 10 February, Odegah's loan at Chelmsford City was extended until the end of the season)	
9 January 2026	CF	—	(England) Tate Xavier-Jones	(Wales) Merthyr Town	31 May 2026	
14 January 2026	LW	7	(Republic of Ireland) Millenic Alli	(England) Portsmouth	31 May 2026	
16 January 2026	CM	—	(England) Charlie Trustram	(England) Bedford Town	11 February 2026	
20 January 2026	CAM	37	(England) Zack Nelson	(England) AFC Wimbledon	31 May 2026	
21 January 2026	LW	35	(England) Ethon Archer	(England) Port Vale	31 May 2026	
21 January 2026	CF	31	(England) Joe Gbodé	(England) Woking	31 May 2026	
30 January 2026	CF	9	(England) Jerry Yates	(England) Sheffield Wednesday	31 May 2026	
31 January 2026	CB	28	(Republic of the Congo) Christ Makosso	(England) Oxford United	31 May 2026 (Note: Option to buy)	
2 February 2026	CF	19	(Scotland) Jacob Brown	(England) Portsmouth	31 May 2026	
2 February 2026	RB	2	(England) Reuell Walters	(England) Blackpool	31 May 2026	
11 February 2026	CF	–	(England) Taylan Harris	(England) Braintree Town	11 March 2026	
26 February 2026	CB	45	(Italy) Vladimir Paternoster	(England) Welling United	31 May 2026 (Note: On 27 March, Paternoster's loan at Welling United was extended until the end of the season)	
26 February 2026	CM	—	(Northern Ireland) Dylan Stitt	(England) Hemel Hempstead Town	26 March 2026	
26 February 2026	GK	41	(England) Lucas Thomas	(England) Gosport Borough	31 May 2026 (Note: Thomas replaced Henry Blackledge after he sustained an injury. On 27 March, his loan at Gosport Borough was extended until the end of the season)	
6 March 2026	GK	—	(England) Liam Coyne	(England) AFC Sudbury	31 May 2026	
13 March 2026	RB	36	(Cyprus) Zach Ioannides	(England) Basingstoke Town	31 May 2026	
13 March 2026	CM	—	(England) Charlie Trustram	(England) Bromsgrove Sporting	31 May 2026	
20 March 2026	LB	—	(England) Kai Source	(England) St Ives Town	31 May 2026	
26 March 2026	GK	46	(England) Charlie Booth	(England) Marine	2 April 2026	

=== Released / Out of contract ===
Date	Pos.	No.	Player	Subsequent club	Join date	Ref.
30 June 2025	CM	—	(England) Axel Piesold	(Republic of Ireland) Galway United	2 July 2025	
30 June 2025	LB	3	(Jamaica) Amari'i Bell	(England) Charlton Athletic	4 July 2025	
30 June 2025	LW	—	(Antigua and Barbuda) Dion Pereira	(England) Crawley Town	4 July 2025	
30 June 2025	CDM	17	(Democratic Republic of the Congo) Pelly Ruddock Mpanzu	(England) Cambridge United	24 July 2025	
30 June 2025	CB	—	(England) Jack Bateson	(England) Hemel Hempstead Town	25 July 2025	
30 June 2025	CDM	—	(Portugal) Dominic Dos Santos Martins	(England) Morpeth Town	10 September 2025	
30 June 2025	RW	7	(Nigeria) Victor Moses	(Kazakhstan) FC Kaisar	24 January 2026	
30 June 2025	GK	23	(Netherlands) Tim Krul	Retired		
30 June 2025	GK	31	(England) Jameson Horlick			
30 June 2025	CB	—	(England) Tyrell Giwa	(United States) Northeast Hawks	August 2025	
7 October 2025	CB	—	(Wales) Tom Lockyer	(England) Bristol Rovers	23 October 2025	
2 February 2026	CDM	13	(Zimbabwe) Marvelous Nakamba	(England) Sheffield Wednesday	2 February 2026	

=== New contract ===
Date	Pos.	No.	Player	Contract until	Ref.
4 June 2025	CF	43	(England) Josh Phillips	Undisclosed	
28 August 2025	GK	1	(England) James Shea	Undisclosed	

== Pre-season and friendlies ==
On 13 June, Luton Town announced three pre-season friendlies, against Tottenham Hotspur, Boreham Wood and Gillingham. Four days later, a trip to Southend United was confirmed. A training camp in Slovenia along with a friendly against Triglav Kranj was also added.

5 July 2025 Friendly	Boreham Wood	0–3	Luton Town	Borehamwood
13:00 BST		Report	Woodrow 10'; Fanne 55', 77'	Stadium: Meadow Park; Referee: Dave Rock

12 July 2025 Friendly	Triglav Kranj	1–8	Luton Town	Kranj, Slovenia
12:00 CEST		Report	Nelson 35'; Paternoster 50'; Xavier-Jones 52'; Nordås 55', 69'; Baptiste 60'; Harris 65'; Odegah 79'	Stadium: Stanko Mlakar Stadium

15 July 2025 Friendly	Luton Town	4–1	Colchester United	Luton
13:00 BST	Richards 40'; Nordås 57'; Wells 66'; Alli 76'	Report	Trialist 64' (pen.)	Stadium: The Brache; Attendance: 0 (behind-closed-doors)
Note: 2x60 minute matches

19 July 2025 Friendly	Gillingham	0–2	Luton Town	Gillingham
15:00 BST		Report	Clark 29', 39'	Stadium: Priestfield Stadium; Attendance: 1,967

22 July 2025 Friendly	Southend United	0–2	Luton Town	Southend-on-Sea
19:45 BST		Report	Woodrow 41'; Nordås 80'	Stadium: Roots Hall; Attendance: 1,919 (179 Town)

26 July 2025 Friendly	Luton Town	0–0	Tottenham Hotspur	Luton
15:00 BST		Report		Stadium: Kenilworth Road; Attendance: 10,871

== Competitions ==
=== Overall record ===
Competition	First match	Last match	Starting round	Final position	Record							
Competition	First match	Last match	Starting round	Final position	Pld	W	D	L	GF	GA	GD	Win %
EFL League One	1 August 2025	2 May 2026	Matchday 1	7th	46	21	11	14	68	56	+12	45.65
FA Cup	31 October 2025	6 December 2025	First round	Second round	2	1	1	0	6	5	+1	50.00
EFL Cup	12 August 2025	12 August 2025	First round	First round	1	0	0	1	0	1	−1	0.00
EFL Trophy	2 September 2025	12 April 2026	Group stage	Winners	8	6	0	2	20	10	+10	75.00
Total					57	28	12	17	94	72	+22	49.12

Last updated: 2 May 2026
Source: Soccerway

=== EFL League One ===
==== League table ====
Pos	Team	Pld	W	D	L	GF	GA	GD	Pts	Promotion, qualification or relegation
5	Bolton Wanderers (O, P)	46	19	18	9	70	52	+18	75	Qualification for League One play-offs
6	Stevenage	46	21	12	13	49	46	+3	75	Qualification for League One play-offs
7	Luton Town	46	21	11	14	68	56	+12	74	
8	Plymouth Argyle	46	22	7	17	75	63	+12	73	
9	Huddersfield Town	46	18	13	15	74	64	+10	67	

Source: EFL Official Website
Rules for classification: 1) Points; 2) Goal difference; 3) Number of goals scored; 4) Head-to-head results; 5) Wins; 6) Away goals; 7) Penalty points (sec 9.5); 8) 12-point sending off offences
(O) Play-off winners; (P) Promoted

==== Results summary ====
Overall								Home						Away					
Pld	W	D	L	GF	GA	GD	Pts	W	D	L	GF	GA	GD	W	D	L	GF	GA	GD
46	21	11	14	68	56	+12	74	13	6	4	37	24	+13	8	5	10	31	32	−1

Last updated: 2 May 2026.
Source: Soccerway

==== Results by round ====
Round	1	2	3	4	5	6	8	9	10	7^{1}	11	13	14	15	16	17	12^{2}	18	19	20	21	22	23	24	26	27	28	29	30	31	32	33	34	35	36	25^{3}	37	38	39	41	42	43	44	40^{4}	45	46
Ground	H	A	A	H	H	A	H	A	H	A	A	H	A	A	H	A	H	H	A	H	A	H	H	A	H	H	A	A	H	H	A	A	H	A	H	A	A	H	H	H	A	H	A	A	H	A
Result	W	W	L	W	L	W	L	L	W	D	L	L	W	W	D	L	W	D	D	D	L	W	W	L	W	D	L	L	W	W	L	L	D	D	L	D	W	W	D	W	W	W	D	W	W	W
Position	8	4	9	6	11	7	9	11	10	7	11	14	10	9	8	12	7	7	7	7	8	8	8	8	7	7	7	9	7	7	8	9	10	10	11	11	11	11	11	11	10	8	8	7	7	7
Points	3	6	6	9	9	12	12	12	15	16	16	16	19	22	23	23	26	27	28	29	29	32	35	35	38	39	39	39	42	45	45	45	46	47	47	48	51	54	55	58	61	64	65	68	71	74

Source: EFL
A = Away; H = Home; W = Win; D = Draw; L = Loss; P = Postponed
Notes:
- ^{1} Matchday 7 (vs. Blackpool) was postponed due to international call-ups.
- ^{2} Matchday 12 (vs. Huddersfield Town) was postponed due to international call-ups.
- ^{3} Matchday 25 (vs. Doncaster Rovers) was postponed due to a frozen pitch and then again due to EFL Trophy involvements.
- ^{4} Matchday 40 (vs. Rotherham United) was postponed due to international call-ups.

==== Matches ====
On 26 June the EFL League One fixtures were announced, with Luton hosting AFC Wimbledon on the opening weekend.

Win Draw Loss Fixtures

1 August 2025 1	Luton Town	1–0	AFC Wimbledon	Luton
20:00 BST	Alli (yellow card) 83'; Johnson 85' (o.g.)	Report	Lewis (yellow card) 36'	Stadium: Kenilworth Road; Attendance: 11,735; Referee: Thomas Parsons

9 August 2025 2	Peterborough United	0–2	Luton Town	Peterborough
12:30 BST	Okagbue (yellow card) 62'; Khela (yellow card) 82'	Report	Andersen 60', (yellow card) 72'; Wells (yellow card) 84'; Clark 85'	Stadium: London Road Stadium; Attendance: 10,827 (2,995 in the away end); Referee: Scott Oldham
Note: Fixture was originally scheduled for a 15:00 kick-off, but was moved for live Sky Sports broadcasting.

16 August 2025 3	Bradford City	2–1	Luton Town	Bradford
15:00 BST	Pointon (yellow card) 30', (goal) 48'; Humphrys 33'; Power (yellow card) 82'	Report	Alli (yellow card) 17'; Lonwijk (yellow card) 27'; Kodua 86'	Stadium: Valley Parade; Attendance: 20,233 (1,338 backing Town); Referee: Edward Duckworth

19 August 2025 4	Luton Town	1–0	Wigan Athletic	Luton
19:45 BST	Saville 9', (yellow card) 67'	Report	Brenan (yellow card) 11'; Kerr (yellow card) 55'	Stadium: Kenilworth Road; Attendance: 10,751 (562 from Wigan); Referee: Carl Brook

23 August 2025 5	Luton Town	0–1	Cardiff City	Luton
12:30 BST	Keeley (yellow card) 52'; Saville (yellow card) 55'	Report	Willock 68'; Chambers (yellow card) 86'	Stadium: Kenilworth Road; Attendance: 11,456 (inc. 1,345 in away end); Referee: Martin Coy
Note: Fixture was originally scheduled for a 15:00 kick-off, but was moved for live Sky Sports broadcasting.

30 August 2025 6	Burton Albion	0–3	Luton Town	Burton upon Trent
15:00 BST		Report	Nordås 18'; Nelson (yellow card) 31', (goal) 59'; Alli 45'	Stadium: Pirelli Stadium; Attendance: 4,487 (Inc. 1,675 Hatters); Referee: Peter Wright

13 September 2025 8	Luton Town	2–3	Plymouth Argyle	Luton
15:00 BST	Yates 20' (pen.); Lonwijk (yellow card) 26'; Wells 49' (pen.); Alli (yellow card) 52'	Report	Sorinola 15'; Sarpong-Wiredu (yellow card) 19'; Ibrahim 45+5', 75'; Edwards (red card) 50'; Mumba (yellow card) 76'; Galloway (yellow card) 90+7'	Stadium: Kenilworth Road; Attendance: 11,801 (inc. 1,342 in away end); Referee: Oliver Yates

20 September 2025 9	Lincoln City	3–1	Luton Town	Lincoln
12:30 BST	House 12', 90'; Collins (yellow card) 17'; Obikwu 85'	Report	Lonwijk (yellow card) 24'; Yates (yellow card) 45+2'; Saville (yellow card) 53'; Mengi (yellow card) 55'; Gbodé (yellow card) 72'; Clark 77'	Stadium: Sincil Bank; Attendance: 9,255 (inc. 1,433 in away end); Referee: Sebastian Stockbridge
Note: Fixture was originally scheduled for a 15:00 kick-off, but was moved for live Sky Sports broadcasting.

27 September 2025 10	Luton Town	1–0	Doncaster Rovers	Luton
15:00 BST	Naismith 40'; Wells (penalty missed) 43'; Keeley (yellow card) 45+5'; Kodua (yellow card) 77'	Report	Middleton (yellow card) 39'	Stadium: Kenilworth Road; Attendance: 10,957 (inc. 1,072 Doncaster fans); Referee: Tim Robinson

30 September 2025 7	Blackpool	2–2	Luton Town	Blackpool
19:45 BST	Hamilton 9', 53'; Fletcher (yellow card) 41'; Morgan (yellow card) 90+1'	Report	Clark 78'; Saville (yellow card) 90+1'; Kodua 90+1' (pen.)	Stadium: Bloomfield Road; Attendance: 8,530 (inc. 491 Luton fans); Referee: Martin Woods
Note: Fixture was originally scheduled for 6 September, but was postponed due to sufficient international call-ups in the squad.

4 October 2025 11	Stevenage	2–0	Luton Town	Stevenage
15:00 BST	White (yellow card) 40'; Sweeney (yellow card) 45+1'; Campbell 65'; Roberts 71'; Marschall (yellow card) 83'	Report	Makosso (yellow card) 35'	Stadium: Broadhall Way; Attendance: 7,228 (inc. 1,363 away); Referee: James Bell

18 October 2025 13	Luton Town	0–2	Mansfield Town	Luton
15:00 BST	Wells (penalty missed) 34'	Report	Oates 40'; Roberts 59' (pen.)	Stadium: Kenilworth Road; Attendance: 11,784 (inc. 1,308 from Mansfield); Referee: Ross Joyce

25 October 2025 14	Northampton Town	0–1	Luton Town	Northampton
15:00 BST	Perkins (yellow card) 13'; Swyer (yellow card) 45+1'	Report	Fanne (yellow card) 40', (goal) 77'; Naismith (yellow card) 52'	Stadium: Sixfields Stadium; Attendance: 8,029 (inc. 1,551 Hatters' fans); Referee: Matt Corlett

8 November 2025 15	Stockport County	0–3	Luton Town	Edgeley
15:00 GMT	Dodgson (yellow card) 20' (yellow-red card) 81'; Lowe (penalty missed) 56'	Report	Naismith (yellow card) 30'; Richards 34'; Bramall 38', (yellow card) 41'; Saville (yellow card) 54'; Keeley (yellow card) 65'; Jones 69'	Stadium: Edgeley Park; Attendance: 10,090 (inc. 1,151 Town fans); Referee: Josh Smith

15 November 2025 16	Luton Town	0–0	Rotherham United	Luton
15:00 GMT	Andersen (yellow card) 33'	Report	Douglas (yellow card) 83'	Stadium: Kenilworth Road; Attendance: 11,091 (711 Millers' fans); Referee: Craig Hicks

22 November 2025 17	Barnsley	5–0	Luton Town	Barnsley
15:00 GMT	Cleary 7', (yellow card) 39'; Kelly 35'; Connell 45'; Kodua 62' (o.g.); Bland (yellow card) 62'; Keillor-Dunn 75'	Report	Saville (yellow card) 16'; Walsh (yellow card) 43'	Stadium: Oakwell; Attendance: 10,882 (inc. 1,478 Town fans); Referee: Thomas Parsons

25 November 2025 12	Luton Town	2–1	Huddersfield Town	Luton
19:45 GMT	Richards 33'; Yates 71'	Report	Harness (yellow card) 54'; Castledine 64'	Stadium: Kenilworth Road; Attendance: 9,971 (inc. 589 Huddersfield fans); Referee: Andrew Humphries
Note: Fixture was originally schedule for 11 October, but was postponed due to international call-ups.

29 November 2025 18	Luton Town	1–1	Bolton Wanderers	Luton
15:00 GMT	Lonwijk (yellow card) 57'; Kodua 83'	Report	Dempsey 8'; Simons (yellow card) 53' (yellow-red card) 70'; Dacres-Cogley (yellow card) 61'	Stadium: Kenilworth Road; Attendance: 11,204 (inc. 1,329 from Bolton); Referee: Ruebyn Ricardo

9 December 2025 19	Leyton Orient	1–1	Luton Town	Leyton
19:45 GMT	Archibald 50'; Happe (yellow card) 62'	Report	Walsh (yellow card) 41'; Andersen (yellow card) 86'; Kodua 90+6'	Stadium: Brisbane Road; Attendance: 8,176 (1,246 Town fans); Referee: Darren Drysdale

13 December 2025 20	Luton Town	2–2	Port Vale	Luton
15:00 GMT	Bramall 26'; Clark (yellow card) 65'; Andersen 70'	Report	Heneghan (yellow card) 15'; Waine 42'; Cole 54'; Byers (yellow card) 77'	Stadium: Kenilworth Road; Attendance: 10,867; Referee: Lee Swabey

18 December 2025 21	Reading	3–2	Luton Town	Reading
20:00 GMT	Wing 8' (pen.); Marriott 52'; Yiadom (yellow card) 72'; Ehibhatiomhan 78', (yellow card) 90'	Report	Clark 59'; Lonwijk 76'; Brown (yellow card) 77'	Stadium: Madejski Stadium; Attendance: 9,252 (inc. 1,101 Town fans); Referee: Edward Duckworth
Note: Fixture was originally scheduled for 20 December, but was rescheduled for live Sky Sports broadcasting.

26 December 2025 22	Luton Town	4–0	Wycombe Wanderers	Luton
15:00 GMT	Kodua 7', 44'; Clark 70'; Morris 78'	Report	Westergaard (yellow card) 41'; Norris (yellow card) 79'	Stadium: Kenilworth Road; Attendance: 11,596 (1,092 from Wycombe); Referee: Dean Whitestone

29 December 2025 23	Luton Town	3–0	Leyton Orient	Luton
19:45 GMT	Kodua 8'; Clark 19' (pen.); Morris 37'; Mengi (yellow card) 52'; Nelson (yellow card) 90+1'	Report		Stadium: Kenilworth Road; Attendance: 11,736 (1,327 Orient fans); Referee: Neil Hair

1 January 2026 24	Exeter City	1–0	Luton Town	Exeter
15:00 GMT	Doyle-Hayes (yellow card) 25'; Cox (yellow card) 29'; Sweeney 50'; Brierley (yellow card) 78'	Report	Brown (yellow card) 67'	Stadium: St James Park; Attendance: 7,912 (inc. 996 Town fans); Referee: Matthew Russell

10 January 2026 26	Luton Town	2–1	Stevenage	Luton
12:30 GMT	Lonwijk (yellow card) 22'; Clark (penalty missed) 29', 55'; Kodua 64'	Report	Freestone 53', (yellow card) 90'; Roberts (yellow card) 69'	Stadium: Kenilworth Road; Attendance: 11,434 (inc. 1,299 in the away end); Referee: Simon Mather
Note: Fixture was originally scheduled for a 15:00 kick-off, but was rescheduled for live Sky Sports broadcasting.

17 January 2026 27	Luton Town	2–2	Lincoln City	Luton
15:00 GMT	Kodua 35'; Wells 45+3'; Bramall (yellow card) 49'	Report	Draper 11', (yellow card) 90+5'; Street 22', (yellow card) 39'; Varfolomeyev (yellow card) 45+6'; McGrandles (yellow card) 46'; Jefferies (yellow card) 75'	Stadium: Kenilworth Road; Attendance: 11,230 (inc. 1,328 from Lincoln); Referee: Scott Oldham

24 January 2026 28	Plymouth Argyle	1–0	Luton Town	Plymouth
12:30 GMT	Ross (yellow card) 45+1'; Galloway 45+3'; Curtis (yellow card) 54'; Boateng (yellow card) 71'; Szűcs (yellow card) 84'	Report	Lonwijk (yellow card) 80'	Stadium: Home Park; Attendance: 15,949 (inc. 790 Hatters' fans); Referee: Elliot Bell
Note: Fixture was originally scheduled for a 15:00 kick-off, but was rescheduled for live Sky Sports broadcasting.

27 January 2026 29	Huddersfield Town	1–0	Luton Town	Huddersfield
19:45 GMT	May (red card) 29'; Ledson 48'; Low (yellow card) 86'	Report	Walsh (yellow card) 4'; Andersen (yellow card) 44'	Stadium: Kirklees Stadium; Attendance: 15,367 (inc. 450+ Luton fans); Referee: Matt Corlett

31 January 2026 30	Luton Town	1–0	Blackpool	Luton
15:00 GMT	Clark 71'; Naismith (yellow card) 90+8'	Report		Stadium: Kenilworth Road; Attendance: 10,697 (728 from Blackpool); Referee: Martin Woods

7 February 2026 31	Luton Town	2–1	Bradford City	Luton
12:30 GMT	Richards 39'; Morris 55'; Palmer (yellow card) 67'; Keeley (yellow card) 75'	Report	Tilt (yellow card) 27'; Neufville (yellow card) 43'; Humphrys 90+6'	Stadium: Kenilworth Road; Attendance: 11,000 (inc. 1,343 from Bradford); Referee: Richard Eley
Note: Fixture was originally scheduled for a 15:00 kick-off, but was rescheduled for live Sky Sports broadcasting.

14 February 2026 32	Cardiff City	3–1	Luton Town	Leckwith
15:00 GMT	Turnbull 11', (yellow card) 13'; Bagan (yellow card) 18'; Colwill 37'; Ng 42'; Trott (yellow card) 64'	Report	Clark 20' (pen.); Lonwijk (yellow card) 45+1'; Palmer (yellow card) 76'	Stadium: Cardiff City Stadium; Attendance: 19,524 (inc. 830 Town fans); Referee: Oliver Yates

18 February 2026 33	Wigan Athletic	1–0	Luton Town	Wigan
19:45 GMT	Aimson (yellow card) 23'; Borges Rodrigues (yellow card) 27'; Moxon (yellow card) 37'; Taylor 73'; Sessegnon (yellow card) 89'	Report	Richards (yellow card) 35'; Lonwijk (yellow card) 63'	Stadium: Brick Community Stadium; Attendance: 8,440 (inc. 618 Town fans); Referee: Jamie O'Connor
Note: Fixture was initially scheduled for 17 February, but was rearranged due to Wigan in FA Cup involvements on the preceding Sunday.

21 February 2026 34	Luton Town	1–1	Burton Albion	Luton
15:00 GMT	Wells 13'; Palmer (yellow card) 36'; Keeley (yellow card) 82'; van den Berg (yellow card) 89'	Report	Evans (yellow card) 29'; Lofthouse (yellow card) 74'; Cannon (yellow card) 89'; Tavares 90+2'	Stadium: Kenilworth Road; Attendance: 10,364; Referee: Seb Stockbridge

28 February 2026 35	Port Vale	1–1	Luton Town	Burslem
15:00 GMT	Hall (yellow card) 6'; Waine 29', (yellow card) 87'; Humphreys (yellow card) 25'	Report	Wells 5'; Johnson (yellow card) 22'; Clark (yellow card) 40'; Naismith (yellow card) 43'	Stadium: Vale Park; Attendance: 7,335 (inc. 1,168 Town fans); Referee: Lee Swabey

7 March 2026 36	Luton Town	2–3	Reading	Luton
15:00 GMT	Lonwijk 45+3'; Saville 53'; Clark (yellow card) 70'	Report	Ehibhatiomhan 5', 81', 84'; Fraser (yellow card) 21'; O'Connor (yellow card) 44'; Williams (yellow card) 80'; Pereira (yellow card) 90+1'	Stadium: Kenilworth Road; Attendance: 11,375 (inc. 1,311 from Reading); Referee: Oliver Mackey

10 March 2026 25	Doncaster Rovers	1–1	Luton Town	Doncaster
19:45 GMT	Hanlan 60'; Gotts (yellow card) 90+4'	Report	Palmer 27', (yellow card) 68'; Clark (yellow card) 41'; Walsh (yellow card) 72'	Stadium: Eco-Power Stadium; Attendance: 7,470 (642 Hatters fans); Referee: Andrew Humphries
Note: Fixture was originally scheduled for 4 January, but it was postponed due to a frozen pitch. It was then postponed again due to EFL Trophy involvements.

14 March 2026 37	Wycombe Wanderers	1–2	Luton Town	High Wycombe
15:00 GMT	Harris (yellow card) 61'; Harvie (yellow card) 70'; Vidigal (yellow card) 84'; Quitirna 90+7'	Report	Naismith 21'; Palmer 39'; Saville (yellow card) 45+1'	Stadium: Adams Park; Attendance: 6,721 (inc. 1,482 Town fans); Referee: Craig Hicks

17 March 2026 38	Luton Town	3–2	Exeter City	Luton
19:45 GMT	Palmer 13'; Clark 29' (pen.); Odoffin 45+5'; Lawrence (yellow card) 72'	Report	Cole 25', (yellow card) 45+4'; Niskanen 49'; McMillan (yellow card) 82'	Stadium: Kenilworth Road; Attendance: 9,216 (inc. 471 from Exeter); Referee: Alex Chilowicz

21 March 2026 39	Luton Town	1–1	Stockport County	Luton
12:30 GMT	Lawrence 28'; Al-Hamadi (yellow card) 77'	Report	Osborn (yellow card) 45+2'; Edun (yellow card) 62'; Norwood 78'	Stadium: Kenilworth Road; Attendance: 10,791 (inc. 1,132 from Stockport); Referee: Bobby Madley
Note: Fixture was initially scheduled for a 15:00 kick-off, but was brought forward for Sky Sports broadcasting.

3 April 2026 41	Luton Town	2–1	Peterborough United	Luton
15:00 BST	Richards 20'; Keeley (yellow card) 33'; Clark 50'; Naismith (yellow card) 80'; Palmer (yellow card) 90+4'	Report	Leonard (penalty missed) 35'; Morgan 75'; Lisbie (yellow card) 80'; Kamara (yellow card) 90+3'	Stadium: Kenilworth Road; Attendance: 11,429 (inc. 1,338 from Peterborough); Referee: Isaac Searle

6 April 2026 42	AFC Wimbledon	0–3	Luton Town	Wimbledon
15:00 BST	Lewis (yellow card) 28'	Report	Palmer 12'; Al-Hamadi 59'; Richards (yellow card) 63', (goal) 79'	Stadium: Plough Lane; Attendance: 8,668 (inc. 930 Town fans); Referee: Carl Brook

15 April 2026 43	Luton Town	2–1	Northampton Town	Luton
19:45 BST	Walsh 43'; Naismith 85'; Lonwijk (yellow card) 90+1'; Keeley (yellow card) 90+4'		Hoskins 31'; McGeehan (yellow card) 62'; McCarthy (yellow card) 76'; Campbell (yellow card) 77'	Stadium: Kenilworth Road; Attendance: 9,638; Referee: James Durkin
Note: Fixture was initially scheduled for 11 April, but was rearranged due to the 2026 EFL Trophy final.

18 April 2026 44	Mansfield Town	2–2	Luton Town	Mansfield
15:00 BST	Russell 21', 28'; Hewitt (yellow card) 66'; Dwyer (yellow card) 84'		Palmer 40'; Morris 50'; Naismith (yellow card) 66'	Stadium: Field Mill; Attendance: 6,418; Referee: Edward Duckworth

21 April 2026 40	Rotherham United	0–2	Luton Town	Rotherham
19:45 BST	Clarke (yellow card) 43'	Report	Palmer 8', 44'; Odoffin (yellow card) 88'; Keeley (yellow card) 90+1'	Stadium: New York Stadium; Attendance: 7,497 (inc. 650 Hatters); Referee: Sam Mulhall
Note: Fixture was initially scheduled for 28 March, but was rearranged due to international call-ups.

25 April 2026 45	Luton Town	2–1	Barnsley	Luton
15:00 BST	Wells 16' (pen.); Walsh (yellow card) 55'; Palmer 79'		Phillips 26'; O'Keeffe (yellow card) 45'; Earl (yellow card) 45+1'; Connell (yellow card) 49'; Bland (yellow card) 67'; O'Connell (yellow card) 90+5'	Stadium: Kenilworth Road; Attendance: 11,781; Referee: Harry Wager

2 May 2026 46	Bolton Wanderers	2–3	Luton Town	Bolton
15:00 BST	Conway (yellow card) 13'; Osei-Tutu 20'; Cissoko 45+3', (yellow card) 60'; Forino (yellow card) 63'; Sheehan (yellow card) 78'		Clark 15' (pen.); Walsh (yellow card) 35'; Odoffin 62'; Palmer (yellow card) 63'; van den Berg (yellow card) 88'; Morris 90+3'	Stadium: Toughsheet Community Stadium; Attendance: 25,555; Referee: Carl Brook

=== FA Cup ===
Luton were drawn at home to Forest Green Rovers in the first round and away to Fleetwood Town in the second round.

Win Draw Loss Fixtures

31 October 2025 First round	Luton Town	4–3	Forest Green Rovers	Luton
19:30 GMT	Fanne 23', (yellow card) 65'; Wells 30', 53'; Naismith (yellow card) 84'; Kodua 90+2'	Report	Knowles 61', (yellow card) 89'; McAllister 68' (pen.); Dausch 79'	Stadium: Kenilworth Road; Attendance: 4,511 (inc. 462 from Forest Green); Referee: Stephen Parkinson

6 December 2025 Second round	Fleetwood Town	2–2 (4–2 p)	Luton Town	Fleetwood
15:00 GMT	Ennis 65', 83'; Graydon (yellow card) 68'	Report	Yates 73'; Johnson (yellow card) 74'; Nelson (yellow card) 78'; Mengi 90+3'	Stadium: Highbury Stadium; Attendance: 1,180 (inc. 663 Luton fans); Referee: Oliver Yates
	Penalties
	Coughlan (penalty scored); Ennis (penalty scored); Holgate (penalty scored); Neal (penalty scored)		Kodua (penalty scored); Naismith (penalty scored); Brown (penalty missed); Walsh (penalty missed)

=== EFL Cup ===
Luton were drawn away to Coventry City in the first round.

Win Draw Loss Fixtures

12 August 2025 First round	Coventry City	1–0	Luton Town	Coventry
19:45 BST	Simms 57'	Report	Holmes (yellow card) 40'	Stadium: Coventry Building Society Arena; Attendance: 10,536 (515 Town fans); Referee: Leigh Doughty

=== EFL Trophy ===
Luton were drawn against Barnet, Cambridge United and Brighton & Hove Albion U21 in the group stage. After winning the group, Town were drawn at home to Exeter City in the round of 32. and to Swindon Town in the round of 16.

Luton were eliminated by Swindon Town in the Round of 16. Swindon were later removed from the competition by the EFL after fielding two ineligible players; Ollie Clarke was serving a suspension by the FA and Aaron Drinan was not named on the team sheet. On 4 February, Luton were reinstated prior to the quarter-final match against Plymouth Argyle.

They later went on to win the competition, achieving a 3–1 victory against Stockport County at Wembley Stadium on 12 April 2026.

==== Group stage ====
Pos	Div	Team	Pld	W	PW	PL	L	GF	GA	GD	Pts	Qualification
1	L1	Luton Town	3	2	0	0	1	8	5	+3	6	Advance to Round 2
2	L2	Cambridge United	3	2	0	0	1	6	4	+2	6	Advance to Round 2
3	L2	Barnet	3	1	1	0	1	5	7	−2	5	
4	ACA	Brighton & Hove Albion U21	3	0	0	1	2	2	5	−3	1	

Source: EFL

Win Draw Loss Fixtures

2 September 2025 South Group H	Luton Town	4–1	Barnet	Luton
19:30 BST	Nordås 11'; Yates 19'; Bramall 45+2'; Morris 87' (pen.)	Report	Kensdale (yellow card) 6'; Winterburn (yellow card) 86'; Senior 90+6'	Stadium: Kenilworth Road; Attendance: 3,157 (Inc. 404 Barnet fans); Referee: Stephen Parkinson

7 October 2025 South Group H	Cambridge United	3–1	Luton Town	Cambridge
19:00 BST	McConnell 33'; Kachunga 46', 80'	Report	Andersen 15'; Morris (yellow card) 44'	Stadium: Abbey Stadium; Attendance: 1,767 (inc. 591 Hatters); Referee: Jacob Miles

28 October 2025 South Group H	Luton Town	3–1	Brighton & Hove Albion U21	Luton
19:00 GMT	Bramall (yellow card) 36'; Yates 37', 43' (pen.), (yellow card) 54'; Evans 79'; Nordås (yellow card) 90+2'	Report	Keogh (yellow card) 69'; Atom 74'; Mackley (yellow card) 86'	Stadium: Kenilworth Road; Attendance: 2,212 (inc. 69 from Brighton); Referee: Alex Chilowicz

==== Knockout stages ====
2 December 2025 Round of 32	Luton Town	4–0	Exeter City	Luton
19:00 GMT	Nordås 13', 40'; Morris 34'; Nelson 67'; Lorentzen-Jones (yellow card) 90+3'	Report	Fitzwater (yellow card) 39'; Dean (yellow card) 52'; Niskanen (yellow card) 71'; Francis (yellow card) 72'; Wareham (yellow card) 84'	Stadium: Kenilworth Road; Attendance: 2,233 (inc. 136 from Exeter); Referee: Kirsty Dowle

13 January 2026 Round of 16	Luton Town	1–2	Swindon Town	Luton
19:00 GMT	Yates 7' (pen.); Walters (yellow card) 78'; Archer (yellow card) 90+8'	Report	Mabete (yellow card) 22', (goal) 53'; Wright 37'; McGregor (yellow card) 60'	Stadium: Kenilworth Road; Attendance: 3,243 (inc. 585 in away end); Referee: Peter Wright

24 February 2026 Quarter-final	Luton Town (Note: Luton Town were reinstated prior to the quarter-finals after Swindon Town were removed from the competition by the EFL for fielding two ineligible players in the Round of 16.)	2–1	Plymouth Argyle	Luton
19:00 GMT	Jones 16'; Clark 89' (pen.)	Report	Edwards (yellow card) 55'; Finn 77'; Ross (yellow card) 88'; Hazard (yellow card) 89'	Stadium: Kenilworth Road; Attendance: 4,203 (inc. 785 from Plymouth); Referee: Benjamin Speedie

4 March 2026 Semi-final	Luton Town	2–1	Northampton Town	Luton
19:30 GMT	Naismith (yellow card) 16'; Wells 53', (yellow card) 60'; Clark (yellow card) 79'; Walsh 82'	Report	McAdam 17'	Stadium: Kenilworth Road; Attendance: 10,280 (inc. 1,311 from Northampton); Referee: Tom Reeves

==== Final ====
12 April 2026
15:00 BST

Luton Town	3–1	Stockport County
Lawrence 22'; Wells 39', 90+1'	Report	Sidibeh 11'

Wembley Stadium, London
Attendance: 49,517
Referee: Martin Coy
Assistant Referees: Marc Wilson, Joe Simpson

== Statistics ==
=== Appearances ===
As of match played 2 May 2026

Players with no appearances are not included on the list; italics indicate loaned in player

No.	Pos	Nat	Player	Total		League One		FA Cup		EFL Cup		EFL Trophy	
No.	Pos	Nat	Player	Apps	Goals	Apps	Goals	Apps	Goals	Apps	Goals	Apps	Goals
1	GK	(England) ENG	James Shea	11	0	1+0	0	1+0	0	1+0	0	8+0	0
2	DF	(England) ENG	Reuell Walters	7	0	3+1	0	1+0	0	0+0	0	2+0	0
3	DF	(Scotland) SCO	Kal Naismith	45	3	35+3	3	1+1	0	0+0	0	5+0	0
4	MF	(Norway) NOR	Sverre Sandal	3	0	0+3	0	0+0	0	0+0	0	0+0	0
5	DF	(Denmark) DEN	Mads Andersen	40	3	30+3	2	1+0	0	0+0	0	6+0	1
6	MF	(Netherlands) NED	Davy van den Berg	17	0	6+9	0	0+0	0	0+0	0	2+0	0
7	MF	(Republic of Ireland) IRL	Millenic Alli	22	1	12+4	1	1+0	0	0+1	0	2+2	0
8	MF	(England) ENG	Liam Walsh	40	2	29+4	1	1+1	0	1+0	0	4+0	1
9	FW	(England) ENG	Jerry Yates	29	7	11+11	2	0+2	1	0+1	0	3+1	4
10	FW	(England) ENG	Cauley Woodrow	2	0	0+1	0	0+0	0	1+0	0	0+0	0
11	FW	(England) ENG	Elijah Adebayo	2	0	0+2	0	0+0	0	0+0	0	0+0	0
12	FW	(Iraq) IRQ	Ali Al-Hamadi	14	1	2+11	1	0+1	0	0+0	0	0+0	0
14	MF	(England) ENG	Shayden Morris	39	7	10+21	5	0+1	0	0+0	0	3+4	2
15	DF	(England) ENG	Teden Mengi	25	1	21+0	0	2+0	1	0+0	0	2+0	0
16	DF	(England) ENG	Hakeem Odoffin	21	2	12+5	2	0+1	0	0+0	0	3+0	0
17	DF	(Netherlands) NED	Nigel Lonwijk	45	2	34+3	2	1+0	0	0+1	0	2+4	0
18	MF	(England) ENG	Jordan Clark	41	13	33+4	12	0+0	0	0+0	0	4+0	1
19	FW	(Scotland) SCO	Jacob Brown	8	0	3+4	0	0+1	0	0+0	0	0+0	0
20	FW	(Norway) NOR	Lasse Nordås	17	4	4+7	1	1+0	0	1+0	0	3+1	3
21	FW	(Bermuda) BER	Nahki Wells	43	10	28+11	5	1+0	2	0+0	0	3+0	3
22	FW	(Jamaica) JAM	Devante Cole	14	0	6+6	0	0+0	0	0+0	0	0+2	0
23	MF	(Northern Ireland) NIR	George Saville	43	2	26+12	2	2+0	0	0+0	0	2+1	0
24	GK	(Republic of Ireland) IRL	Josh Keeley	46	0	45+0	0	1+0	0	0+0	0	0+0	0
25	MF	(Guyana) GUY	Isaiah Jones	20	2	14+3	1	1+0	0	0+0	0	2+0	1
26	MF	(Grenada) GRN	Shandon Baptiste	4	0	2+2	0	0+0	0	0+0	0	0+0	0
27	MF	(England) ENG	Jake Richards	36	5	17+10	5	2+0	0	0+1	0	4+2	0
28	DF	(Republic of the Congo) CGO	Christ Makosso	15	0	10+1	0	0+0	0	0+0	0	3+1	0
29	DF	(England) ENG	Tom Holmes	2	0	0+1	0	0+0	0	1+0	0	0+0	0
30	FW	(England) ENG	Gideon Kodua	48	10	22+16	9	0+2	1	1+0	0	5+2	0
31	FW	(England) ENG	Joe Gbodé	7	0	0+4	0	0+0	0	0+0	0	1+2	0
32	FW	(Scotland) SCO	Emilio Lawrence	21	2	16+1	1	0+0	0	0+0	0	3+1	1
33	DF	(England) ENG	Cohen Bramall	35	3	17+13	2	1+0	0	1+0	0	3+0	1
35	MF	(England) ENG	Ethon Archer	1	0	0+0	0	0+0	0	0+0	0	0+1	0
36	MF	(Cyprus) CYP	Zacharias Ioannides	1	0	0+0	0	0+0	0	0+0	0	0+1	0
37	MF	(England) ENG	Zack Nelson	27	2	6+13	1	1+1	0	1+0	0	5+0	1
38	DF	(England) ENG	Joe Johnson	21	0	16+2	0	1+0	0	0+0	0	1+1	0
39	FW	(England) ENG	Josh Phillips	2	0	0+0	0	0+0	0	0+1	0	0+1	0
42	DF	(Spain) ESP	Christian Chigozie	2	0	0+0	0	0+0	0	1+0	0	1+0	0
44	MF	(England) ENG	Harry Fox	3	0	0+0	0	0+0	0	0+0	0	1+2	0
47	DF	(Wales) WAL	Finley Evans	1	1	0+0	0	0+0	0	0+0	0	1+0	1
48	MF	(England) ENG	Jack Lorentzen-Jones	1	0	0+0	0	0+0	0	0+0	0	0+1	0
49	FW	(Poland) POL	Dawid Gawel	1	0	0+0	0	0+0	0	0+0	0	0+1	0
54	MF	(Jamaica) JAM	Kasey Palmer	23	8	18+2	8	0+0	0	0+0	0	1+2	0
Players who featured but departed the club during the season:
6	DF	(Republic of Ireland) IRL	Mark McGuinness	7	0	4+2	0	0+0	0	1+0	0	0+0	0
13	MF	(Zimbabwe) ZIM	Marvelous Nakamba	4	0	0+1	0	0+0	0	0+0	0	2+1	0
22	MF	(Spain) ESP	Lamine Fanne	27	2	15+6	1	2+0	1	1+0	0	1+2	0

=== Goals ===
As of match played 2 May 2026

Rank	Pos.	No.	Player	League One	FA Cup	EFL Cup	EFL Trophy	Total
1	MF	18	(England) Jordan Clark	12	0	0	1	13
2	FW	21	(Bermuda) Nahki Wells	5	2	0	3	10
2	FW	30	(England) Gideon Kodua	9	1	0	0	10
4	MF	54	(Jamaica) Kasey Palmer	8	0	0	0	8
5	FW	9	(England) Jerry Yates	2	1	0	4	7
5	MF	14	(England) Shayden Morris	5	0	0	2	7
7	MF	27	(England) Jake Richards	5	0	0	0	5
8	FW	20	(Norway) Lasse Nordås	1	0	0	3	4
9	DF	3	(Scotland) Kal Naismith	3	0	0	0	3
9	DF	33	(England) Cohen Bramall	2	0	0	1	3
11	DF	5	(Denmark) Mads Andersen	2	0	0	0	2
11	MF	8	(England) Liam Walsh	1	0	0	1	2
11	DF	16	(England) Hakeem Odoffin	2	0	0	0	2
11	DF	17	(Netherlands) Nigel Lonwijk	2	0	0	0	2
11	MF	22	(Spain) Lamine Fanne	1	1	0	0	2
11	MF	23	(Northern Ireland) George Saville	2	0	0	0	2
11	MF	25	(Guyana) Isaiah Jones	1	0	0	1	2
11	FW	32	(Scotland) Emilio Lawrence	1	0	0	1	2
11	MF	37	(England) Zack Nelson	1	0	0	1	2
20	MF	7	(Republic of Ireland) Millenic Alli	1	0	0	0	1
20	FW	12	(Iraq) Ali Al-Hamadi	1	0	0	0	1
20	DF	15	(England) Teden Mengi	0	1	0	0	1
20	DF	47	(Wales) Finley Evans	0	0	0	1	1
Own goals			1	0	0	0	1	
Total				73	6	0	14	93

=== Clean sheets ===
As of match played 2 May 2026

Rank	No.	Player	League One	FA Cup	EFL Cup	EFL Trophy	Total
1	24	(Republic of Ireland) Josh Keeley	13	0	0	0	13
2	1	(England) James Shea	0	0	0	1	1
Total			13	0	0	1	14

=== Disciplinary record ===
As of match played 2 May 2026

Rank	No.	Pos.	Player	League One			FA Cup			EFL Cup			EFL Trophy			Total		
Rank	No.	Pos.	Player	Yellow card	(yellow card) (yellow-red card)	Red card	Yellow card	(yellow card) (yellow-red card)	Red card	Yellow card	(yellow card) (yellow-red card)	Red card	Yellow card	(yellow card) (yellow-red card)	Red card	Yellow card	(yellow card) (yellow-red card)	Red card
1	17	DF	(Netherlands) Nigel Lonwijk	9	0	0	0	0	0	0	0	0	0	0	0	9	0	0
2	3	DF	(Scotland) Kal Naismith	6	0	0	1	0	0	0	0	0	1	0	0	8	0	0
2	24	GK	(Republic of Ireland) Josh Keeley	8	0	0	0	0	0	0	0	0	0	0	0	8	0	0
4	23	MF	(Northern Ireland) George Saville	7	0	0	0	0	0	0	0	0	0	0	0	7	0	0
5	8	MF	(England) Liam Walsh	6	0	0	0	0	0	0	0	0	0	0	0	6	0	0
5	54	MF	(Jamaica) Kasey Palmer	6	0	0	0	0	0	0	0	0	0	0	0	6	0	0
7	18	MF	(England) Jordan Clark	4	0	0	0	0	0	0	0	0	1	0	0	5	0	0
8	5	DF	(Denmark) Mads Andersen	4	0	0	0	0	0	0	0	0	0	0	0	4	0	0
9	7	MF	(Republic of Ireland) Millenic Alli	3	0	0	0	0	0	0	0	0	0	0	0	3	0	0
9	21	FW	(Bermuda) Nahki Wells	1	0	0	0	0	0	0	0	0	2	0	0	3	0	0
9	27	MF	(England) Jake Richards	2	0	0	0	0	0	0	0	0	1	0	0	3	0	0
9	33	DF	(England) Cohen Bramall	2	0	0	0	0	0	0	0	0	1	0	0	3	0	0
9	37	MF	(England) Zack Nelson	2	0	0	1	0	0	0	0	0	0	0	0	3	0	0
14	6	MF	(Netherlands) Davy van den Berg	2	0	0	0	0	0	0	0	0	0	0	0	2	0	0
14	9	FW	(England) Jerry Yates	1	0	0	0	0	0	0	0	0	1	0	0	2	0	0
14	15	DF	(England) Teden Mengi	2	0	0	0	0	0	0	0	0	0	0	0	2	0	0
14	19	FW	(Scotland) Jacob Brown	2	0	0	0	0	0	0	0	0	0	0	0	2	0	0
14	22	MF	(Spain) Lamine Fanne	1	0	0	1	0	0	0	0	0	0	0	0	2	0	0
14	38	DF	(England) Joe Johnson	1	0	0	1	0	0	0	0	0	0	0	0	2	0	0
20	2	DF	(England) Reuell Walters	0	0	0	0	0	0	0	0	0	1	0	0	1	0	0
20	12	FW	(Iraq) Ali Al-Hamadi	1	0	0	0	0	0	0	0	0	0	0	0	1	0	0
20	16	DF	(England) Hakeem Odoffin	1	0	0	0	0	0	0	0	0	0	0	0	1	0	0
20	20	FW	(Norway) Lasse Nordås	0	0	0	0	0	0	0	0	0	1	0	0	1	0	0
20	25	MF	(Guyana) Isaiah Jones	0	0	0	0	0	0	0	0	0	1	0	0	1	0	0
20	28	DF	(Republic of the Congo) Christ Makosso	1	0	0	0	0	0	0	0	0	0	0	0	1	0	0
20	29	DF	(England) Tom Holmes	0	0	0	0	0	0	1	0	0	0	0	0	1	0	0
20	30	FW	(England) Gideon Kodua	1	0	0	0	0	0	0	0	0	0	0	0	1	0	0
20	31	FW	(England) Joe Gbodé	1	0	0	0	0	0	0	0	0	0	0	0	1	0	0
20	32	FW	(Scotland) Emilio Lawrence	1	0	0	0	0	0	0	0	0	0	0	0	1	0	0
20	35	MF	(England) Ethon Archer	0	0	0	0	0	0	0	0	0	1	0	0	1	0	0
20	48	MF	(England) Jack Lorentzen-Jones	0	0	0	0	0	0	0	0	0	1	0	0	1	0	0
Total				74	0	0	4	0	0	1	0	0	12	0	0	91	0	0
