= Josh Keeley =

Irish footballer (born 2003)

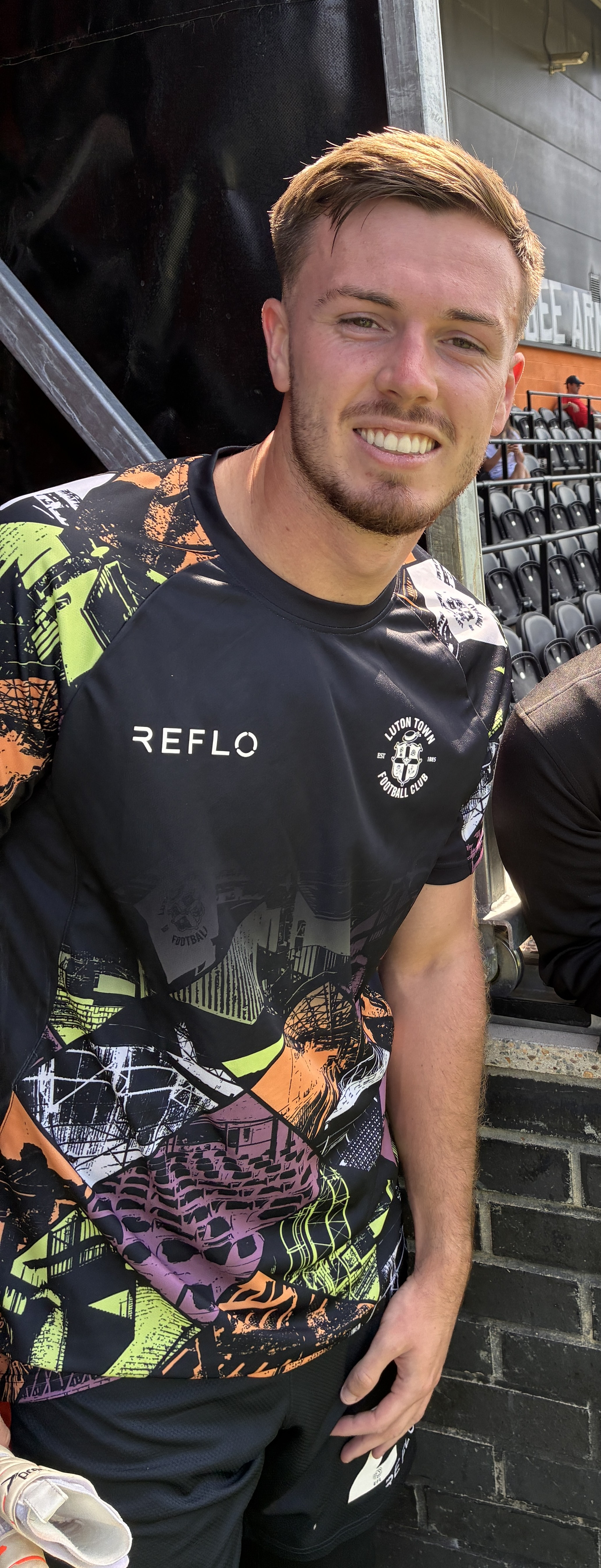
- Keeley in 2026.

Personal information
- Full name: Josh Keeley
- Date of birth: 17 May 2003 (age 23)
- Place of birth: Dunboyne, Ireland
- Height: 1.91 m (6 ft 3 in)
- Position: Goalkeeper

Team information
- Current team: Luton Town
- Number: 24

Youth career
- –2021: St Patrick's Athletic

Senior career*
Years	Team	Apps	(Gls)
2021–2022	St Patrick's Athletic	1	(0)
2022–2025	Tottenham Hotspur	0	(0)
2024	→ Barnet (loan)	18	(0)
2024–2025	→ Leyton Orient (loan)	36	(0)
2025–	Luton Town	51	(0)

International career^{‡}
2022	Republic of Ireland U19	1	(0)
2023–2024	Republic of Ireland U21	10	(0)
2026–	Republic of Ireland	1	(0)
- * Club domestic league appearances and goals as of 20:57, 10 September 2026 (UTC) ‡ National team caps and goals as of 19:09, 16 May 2026 (UTC)

Josh Keeley (born 17 May 2003) is an Irish professional footballer who plays as a goalkeeper for EFL League One club Luton Town and the Republic of Ireland national team.

== Club career ==
=== St Patrick's Athletic ===
Keeley began his senior career playing for League of Ireland Premier Division club St Patrick's Athletic, where he turned professional in January 2021 after coming through the club's academy. Keeley progressed through the club's academy, winning the league at U15, U17 and U19 levels before being called up to the bench of the first team in their final game of 2020 at home to Bohemians. On 23 July 2021, Keeley made his debut in senior football, replacing Vítězslav Jaroš from the bench in a 6–0 win over Bray Wanderers in the FAI Cup. He made his league debut for the club on 12 November 2021 in their final home game of the season in a 2–2 draw with Finn Harps at Richmond Park.

=== Tottenham Hotspur ===
On 1 July 2022, Keeley signed for Premier League club Tottenham Hotspur. In July 2023, he was called up to be part of the first team squad that travelled to Australia, Thailand and Singapore. After again being part of the summer pre-season tour the following season, in August 2024 he signed a new three-year-contract with the club.

==== Barnet loan ====
In January 2024, he signed on loan for Barnet in the National League until the end of the season. He made a total of 21 appearances in all competitions for the club during his loan spell.

==== Leyton Orient loan ====
Keeley signed on loan for EFL League One club Leyton Orient in August 2024. On 30 November 2024, he scored his first goal for the club, the first of his career, with a 99th-minute equaliser to take the game to extra time in an eventual 2–1 win at home to Oldham Athletic in the FA Cup. He set a club record with seven clean sheets in all competitions on 29 December. Keeley was named Leyton Orient Supporters' Club Young Player of the Year, Leyton Orient Supporters' Club Merit Award and Goal of the Season winner at the club's end of season awards night.

=== Luton Town ===
On 19 July 2025, Keeley signed for EFL League One club Luton Town for a fee of £1 million.

== International career ==
A former Republic of Ireland under-19 and under-21 international, Keeley was called up to train with the Republic of Ireland senior team in June 2024. On 14 May 2025, he received his first senior call up to the Republic of Ireland national team for their friendly fixtures against Senegal and Luxembourg in June. On 16 May 2026, Keeley made his senior Republic of Ireland debut, replacing Max O'Leary from the bench in a 5–0 win over Grenada in a friendly.

== Personal life ==
Keeley is the brother of fellow professional footballer Conor Keeley, a defender who has played for various clubs in the League of Ireland and NIFL Premiership. Their father Brendan Keeley was also a goalkeeper, who played for NIFL Premiership club Newry City among others.

== Career statistics ==
=== Club ===
As of match played 17 November 2026

Appearances and goals by club, season and competition
Club	Season	League			National cup (Note: Includes FAI Cup, FA Cup)		League cup (Note: Includes EFL Cup)		Other		Total	
Club	Season	Division	Apps	Goals	Apps	Goals	Apps	Goals	Apps	Goals	Apps	Goals
St Patrick's Athletic	2021	LOI Premier Division	1	0	1	0	—		—		2	0
St Patrick's Athletic	2022	LOI Premier Division	0	0	0	0	—		0	0	0	0
St Patrick's Athletic	Total		1	0	1	0	0	0	0	0	2	0
Tottenham Hotspur U21	2022–23	—			—		—		2 (Note: Appearances in EFL Trophy)	0	2	0
Tottenham Hotspur U21	2023–24	—			—		—		3	0	3	0
Tottenham Hotspur U21	Total				—		—		5	0	5	0
Barnet (loan)	2023–24	National League	18	0	—		—		3 (Note: Appearances in the FA Trophy)	0	21	0
Leyton Orient (loan)	2024–25	League One	36	0	4	1	1	0	4 (Note: One appearance in the EFL Trophy and three appearances in the EFL League One play-offs)	0	45	1
Luton Town	2025–26	League One	45	0	1	0	0	0	0	0	46	0
Luton Town	2026–27	League One	6	0	1	0	2	0	1	0	10	0
Luton Town	Total		51	0	2	0	2	0	1	0	56	0
Career total			106	0	7	1	3	0	8	0	124	1

=== International ===
As of match played on 16 May 2026

Appearances and goals by national team and year
National team	Year	Apps	Goals
Republic of Ireland
Republic of Ireland	2026	1	0
Total		1	0

== Honours ==
Luton Town

- EFL Trophy: 2025–26
