= Mads Juel Andersen =

Danish footballer (born 1997)

Mads Andersen
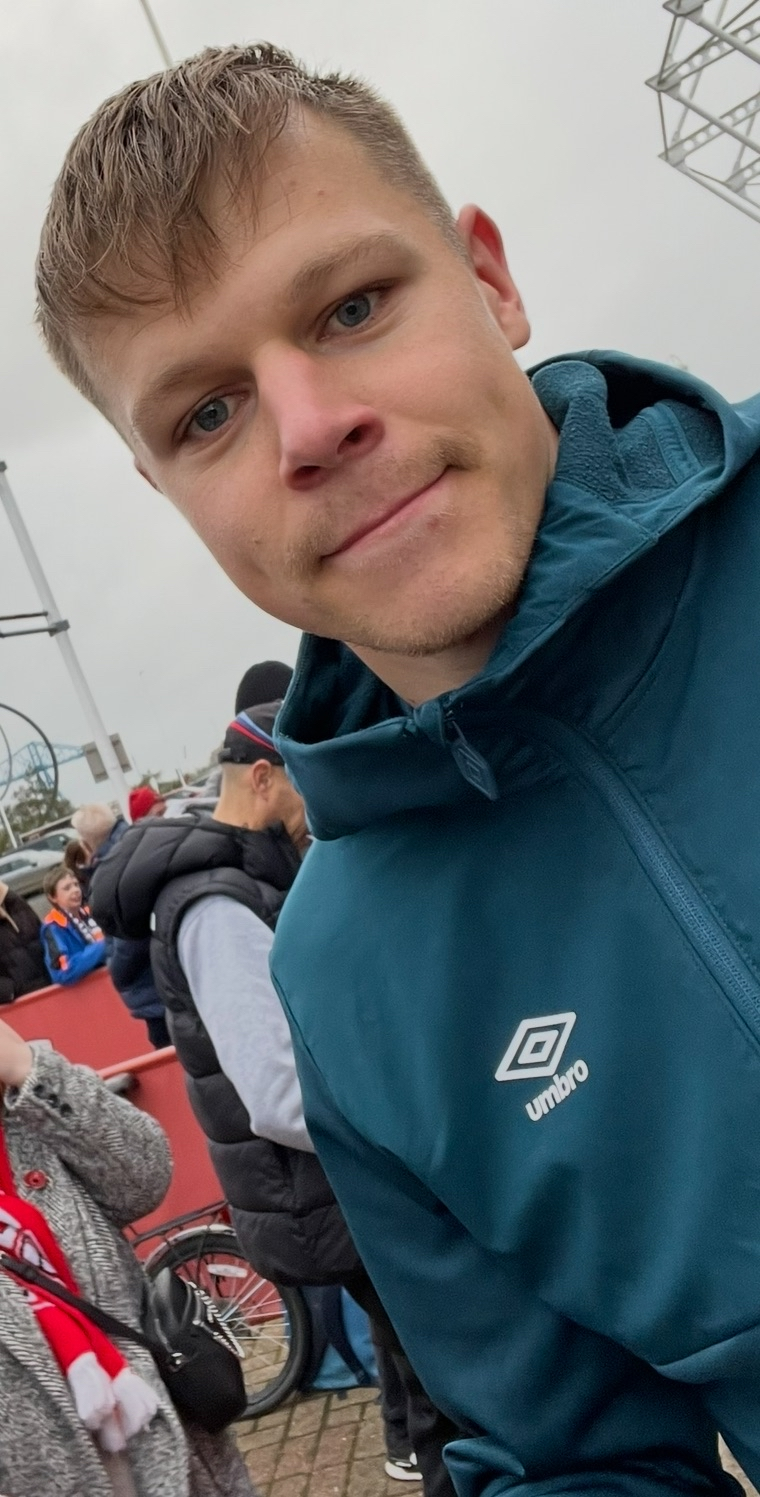
- Andersen with Luton Town in 2024

Personal information
- Full name: Mads Juel Andersen
- Date of birth: 27 December 1997 (age 28)
- Place of birth: Albertslund, Denmark
- Height: 1.94 m (6 ft 4 in)
- Position: Centre-back

Team information
- Current team: Luton Town
- Number: 5

Youth career
- 2002–2005: Herstedøster
- 2005: Albertslund
- 2005–2016: Brøndby

Senior career*
Years	Team	Apps	(Gls)
2016–2017	Brøndby	0	(0)
2016–2017	→ HB Køge (loan)	25	(2)
2017–2019	Horsens	28	(4)
2019–2023	Barnsley	146	(3)
2023–	Luton Town	63	(5)

International career^{‡}
2015–2016	Denmark U19	2	(0)
- * Club domestic league appearances and goals as of 18:48, 21 November 2026 (UTC) ‡ National team caps and goals as of 16:55, 20 November 2026 (UTC)

Mads Juel Andersen (born 27 December 1997) is a Danish professional footballer who plays as a centre-back for EFL League One club Luton Town.

== Club career ==
=== Youth career ===
Andersen started his football career at Herstedøster at the age of five. He has stated that he only joined the club to be with his friends – having preferred to go into athletics instead.

After playing for nine months at Albertslund, Andersen joined Brøndby's academy at the age of nine.

=== Brøndby ===
In November 2015, Andersen penned his first professional contract with Brøndby. On 12 April 2015, he was named in his first squad for the club in a match against SønderjyskE, where he remained on the bench for the whole game.

In the 2015–16 season, Andersen was only called up for one game. In the following season, he was loaned out to HB Køge in the 1st Division until January, with the deal later being extended to the end of the season. Andersen played 25 league games and scored two goals for the club before he returned to Brøndby.

Andersen got his debut for Brøndby in the Danish Cup against Ledøje-Smørum Fodbold, where he played all 90 minutes. However, he didn't make any appearances in the league for the club, before he left.

=== Horsens ===
On 27 September 2017 it was announced that Andersen would join Superliga side AC Horsens from the new year. From the 2018–19 season, Andersen turned in to a very important player for the club, becoming a regular starter for the team. He played 20 league games and scored three goals in that season.

=== Barnsley ===
On 21 June 2019, Andersen left Horsens to move abroad, joining EFL Championship side Barnsley for a reported fee of £900,000 in a four-year contract. In his first season with the club, Andersen was a regular starter and played in almost every game. He scored his first goal for Barnsley in a 2–2 draw with Cardiff City on 27 January 2021. Andersen was appointed captain from the 2022–23 season.

=== Luton Town ===
On 3 July 2023, Andersen signed for newly promoted Premier League club Luton Town for an undisclosed fee. He scored Luton's first ever home Premier League goal on 1 September 2023 against West Ham United in a 2–1 defeat.

Andersen was sidelined in October 2023 with a hamstring injury, followed by a recurring calf issue that limited him to just eight appearances in his debut season with Luton. In February 2024, he consulted a specialist to address the calf problem.

In the 2024–25 season, Andersen once again was limited by injury issues. In the next season following the club's double relegation, he became a regular starter for the club in League One, making 33 appearances.

== International career ==
Andersen made his debut for the Denmark Under-19s national team on 14 November 2015 in a Euro U19 qualifier against Israel, following two appearances as an unused substitute.

== Career statistics ==
As of match played 21 November 2026

Appearances and goals by club, season and competition
Club	Season	League			National cup (Note: Includes Danish Cup, FA Cup)		League cup (Note: Includes EFL Cup)		Other		Total	
Club	Season	Division	Apps	Goals	Apps	Goals	Apps	Goals	Apps	Goals	Apps	Goals
Brøndby	2015–16	Superliga	0	0	0	0	—		0	0	0	0
Brøndby	2016–17	Superliga	0	0	0	0	—		0	0	0	0
Brøndby	2017–18	Superliga	0	0	1	0	—		0	0	1	0
Brøndby	Total		0	0	1	0	—		0	0	1	0
HB Køge (loan)	2016–17	1st Division	25	2	3	0	—		—		28	2
Horsens	2017–18	Superliga	8	1	0	0	—		—		8	1
Horsens	2018–19	Superliga	20	3	2	1	—		2 (Note: Appearances in Danish Superliga relegation playoffs)	0	24	4
Horsens	Total		28	4	2	1	—		2	0	32	5
Barnsley	2019–20	Championship	38	0	2	0	1	0	—		41	0
Barnsley	2020–21	Championship	46	1	3	0	2	0	2 (Note: Appearances in EFL Championship play-offs)	0	53	1
Barnsley	2021–22	Championship	28	1	2	1	0	0	—		30	2
Barnsley	2022–23	League One	44	1	2	0	2	1	3 (Note: Appearances in EFL Trophy)	0	51	2
Barnsley	Total		156	3	9	1	5	1	5	0	175	5
Luton Town	2023–24	Premier League	8	1	0	0	2	0	—		10	1
Luton Town	2024–25	Championship	8	0	0	0	1	0	—		9	0
Luton Town	2025–26	League One	33	2	1	0	0	0	6	1	37	3
Luton Town	2026–27	League One	14	2	1	0	0	0	3	0	18	2
Luton Town	Total		63	5	2	0	3	0	9	1	77	6
Career total			272	14	17	2	8	1	16	1	313	18

== Honours ==
Luton Town

- EFL Trophy: 2025–26

Individual

- Barnsley Player of the Season: 2022–23
- EFL League One Team of the Season: 2022–23
- PFA Team of the Year: 2022–23 League One
