= Kal Naismith =

Scottish footballer (born 1992)

Personal information
- Full name: Kal Alexander Naismith
- Date of birth: 18 February 1992 (age 34)
- Place of birth: Glasgow, Scotland
- Height: 6 ft 1 in (1.85 m)
- Position: Centre-back

Team information
- Current team: Luton Town
- Number: 3

Youth career
- –2011: Rangers

Senior career*
Years	Team	Apps	(Gls)
2011–2013	Rangers	17	(1)
2011	→ Cowdenbeath (loan)	9	(2)
2012	→ Partick Thistle (loan)	8	(0)
2013–2015	Accrington Stanley	73	(14)
2015–2018	Portsmouth	82	(18)
2015–2016	→ Hartlepool United (loan)	4	(0)
2018–2021	Wigan Athletic	79	(6)
2021–2022	Luton Town	64	(3)
2022–2025	Bristol City	44	(1)
2025	→ Luton Town (loan)	10	(0)
2025–	Luton Town	47	(3)

International career
2007–2008	Scotland U16	4	(1)
2008–2009	Scotland U17	8	(0)
- * Club domestic league appearances and goals as of 22:40, 3 November 2026 (UTC)

Kal Alexander Naismith (born 18 February 1992) is a Scottish professional footballer who plays as a defender and is the captain of EFL League One club Luton Town.

A Rangers youth graduate, Naismith made his breakthrough into the first team in the 2012–13 season, after loan spells at Cowdenbeath and Partick Thistle. He subsequently moved to England and played for Accrington Stanley, Portsmouth, Wigan Athletic, Luton Town and Bristol City before returning to Luton in January 2025. He has represented Scotland at youth international level.

== Club career ==
=== Rangers ===
Born in Glasgow, Naismith joined the Rangers academy at young age.

==== Cowdenbeath (loan) ====
Naismith joined Second Division club Cowdenbeath on loan at the end of August 2011. He made his debut on 10 September against East Fife, going on to score his first goals for the club on 24 September - scoring both goals in their 2–1 win over Albion Rovers. With matches limited due to call offs, his last game came on 10 December against Arbroath.

==== Partick Thistle (loan) ====
On 5 January 2012, Naismith joined First Division club Partick Thistle on loan until the end of the season, however was unable to play against Queen of the South in the Scottish Cup that weekend as he was cup tied having played for Cowdenbeath earlier in the season. He made his debut on 13 January, starting in their 1–0 defeat to Hamilton Academical.

==== Return to Rangers ====
After spending the 2011–12 season out on loan, Naismith made his debut for Rangers as a substitute on 29 July 2012, in a 2–1 win over Brechin City in the Challenge Cup.

He scored his first goal for Rangers against Forres Mechanics in the Second Round of the 2012–13 Scottish Cup.

On 9 August 2013, Naismith mutually agreed with Rangers to terminate his contract.

=== Accrington Stanley ===
In Summer 2013, Naismith was given a trial at English League Two club Accrington Stanley, completing a switch to them on a free transfer shortly after. He made his debut for the club on 10 August, starting in a 2–2 home draw against Portsmouth.

Naismith scored his first goal for Stanley on 22 October 2013, netting the winner in a 2–1 home success over Bristol Rovers. He also scored braces against Torquay United and Mansfield Town, finishing the 2013–14 season with ten goals in 38 appearances.

Naismith was also a regular starter for the club in 2014–15, scoring four goals in 35 games.

=== Portsmouth ===
On 28 May 2015, Naismith signed a three-year deal with fellow League Two side Portsmouth, for an undisclosed fee.

On 13 November 2025, Naismith joined Hartlepool United on a short-term loan deal until January.

Naismith scored 13 goals in the season for Portsmouth, which saw them finish as league champions – confirmed on the last day of the season.

At the end of the 2017–18 season, Portsmouth announced that Naismith had rejected a new deal from the club, deciding to pursue other options elsewhere.

=== Wigan Athletic ===
On 30 May 2018, Naismith signed a three-year deal with Championship side Wigan Athletic. He scored his first goal for Wigan in a 4–2 loss at Sheffield United on 27 October 2018.

On 7 January 2021, Naismith left Wigan by mutual consent.

=== Luton Town ===
On 15 January 2021, Naismith signed for Championship side Luton Town on a permanent deal. He scored his first goal for Luton on 27 February 2021 in a 3–2 win against Sheffield Wednesday. On 15 January 2022, he scored a last minute goal in a 3–2 win over Bournemouth.

Despite being offered a new contract with Luton Town, Naismith left the club at the end of the 2021–22 season.

=== Bristol City ===
On 27 May 2022, Naismith signed a three-year deal with Championship side Bristol City on a free transfer. He scored his first goal for Bristol City in an EFL Cup win over Coventry City on 10 August 2022.

On 28 January 2025, Naismith was sent out on loan to former club Luton Town until the end of the season, and was later released by Bristol City at the end of his contract on 1 July 2025.

=== Return to Luton Town ===
On 10 June 2025, Naismith signed permanently for Luton Town on a free transfer after having been on loan at the club since January.

On 25 July 2025, Luton manager Matt Bloomfield confirmed Naismith would be the club's captain from the 2025–26 season, following the departures of Tom Lockyer and Carlton Morris.

== International career ==
Naismith has represented Scotland at Under-16 level, making his debut against Wales on 5 October 2007. His first goal came on 29 November against England. He later represented the Under-17 team, making eight appearances.

== Personal life ==
On 20 September 2010, Naismith and fellow Rangers player Kyle Hutton were abducted in Edinburgh by two men and driven around the city in Hutton's car, before being dumped in the Niddrie area of the city. Naismith and Hutton were mugged and car was stolen. Both thieves were subsequently convicted and prosecuted and Hutton's car was retrieved.

== Style of play ==
Naismith has played in a variety of positions throughout his career, including as a striker, winger and in midfield. In the 2025–26 season for Luton Town, he primarily played as a left-back or centre-back. His main attributes are his ball control and versatility.

== Career statistics ==
As of match played 3 November 2026

Appearances and goals by club, season and competition
Club	Season	League			National Cup (Note: Includes Scottish Cup and FA Cup)		League Cup (Note: Includes Scottish League Cup and EFL Cup)		Other		Total	
Club	Season	Division	Apps	Goals	Apps	Goals	Apps	Goals	Apps	Goals	Apps	Goals
Rangers	2011–12	Scottish Premier League	0	0	0	0	0	0	0	0	0	0
Rangers	2012–13	Scottish Third Division	17	1	4	2	0	0	3 (Note: Appearances in Scottish Challenge Cup)	0	24	3
Rangers	Total		17	1	4	2	0	0	3	0	24	3
Cowdenbeath (loan)	2011–12	Scottish Second Division	9	2	1	0	0	0	0	0	10	2
Partick Thistle (loan)	2011–12	Scottish First Division	8	0	0	0	0	0	0	0	8	0
Accrington Stanley	2013–14	League Two	38	10	1	0	1	0	0	0	40	10
Accrington Stanley	2014–15	League Two	35	4	2	0	1	0	1 (Note: Appearance(s) in the Football League/EFL Trophy)	0	39	4
Accrington Stanley	Total		73	14	3	0	2	0	1	0	79	14
Portsmouth	2015–16	League Two	19	3	1	0	0	0	2 (Note: One appearance in the Football League Trophy and one appearance in League Two play-offs)	0	22	3
Portsmouth	2016–17	League Two	37	13	0	0	1	1	3	1	41	15
Portsmouth	2017–18	League One	26	2	0	0	1	0	4	1	31	3
Portsmouth	Total		82	18	1	0	2	1	9	2	94	21
Hartlepool United (loan)	2015–16	League Two	4	0	—		—		—		4	0
Wigan Athletic	2018–19	Championship	30	1	1	0	1	0	—		32	1
Wigan Athletic	2019–20	Championship	37	3	0	0	1	0	—		38	3
Wigan Athletic	2020–21	League One	12	2	0	0	1	0	1	1	14	3
Wigan Athletic	Total		79	6	1	0	3	0	1	1	84	7
Luton Town	2020–21	Championship	22	1	1	0	0	0	—		23	1
Luton Town	2021–22	Championship	42	2	1	1	0	0	2 (Note: Appearances in Championship play-offs)	0	45	3
Luton Town	Total		64	3	2	1	0	0	2	0	68	4
Bristol City	2022–23	Championship	25	0	3	0	2	1	—		30	1
Bristol City	2023–24	Championship	13	1	0	0	2	1	—		15	2
Bristol City	2024–25	Championship	6	0	0	0	1	0	—		7	0
Bristol City	Total		44	1	3	0	5	2	—		52	3
Luton Town (loan)	2024–25	Championship	10	0	0	0	0	0	—		10	0
Luton Town	2025–26	League One	38	3	2	0	0	0	5	0	45	3
Luton Town	2026–27	League One	9	0	0	0	1	0	2	0	12	0
Luton Town	Luton Town total		121	6	4	1	1	0	9	0	135	7
Career total			437	48	17	3	13	3	23	3	490	57

== Honours ==
Rangers

- Scottish Third Division: 2012–13

Portsmouth

- EFL League Two: 2016–17

Luton Town

- EFL Trophy: 2025–26

Individual

- Luton Town Player of the Season: 2021–22
