= Cohen Bramall =

English footballer (born 1996)

Personal information
- Full name: Cohen Conrad Bramall
- Date of birth: 2 April 1996 (age 30)
- Place of birth: Crewe, England
- Height: 5 ft 9 in (1.75 m)
- Position: Left back

Team information
- Current team: Milton Keynes Dons
- Number: 15

Senior career*
Years	Team	Apps	(Gls)
2010–2014	Kidsgrove Athletic		
2014	→ Alsager Town (dual reg.)		
2014	Nantwich Town		
2014	Market Drayton Town		
2014–2015	Newcastle Town		
2015–2016	Market Drayton Town		
2016–2017	Hednesford Town	21	(0)
2017–2019	Arsenal	0	(0)
2017–2018	→ Birmingham City (loan)	5	(0)
2019–2021	Colchester United	47	(1)
2021–2022	Lincoln City	46	(2)
2022–2025	Rotherham United	91	(2)
2025	Portsmouth	12	(0)
2025–2026	Luton Town	30	(2)
2026–	Milton Keynes Dons	6	(0)
- * Club domestic league appearances and goals as of 21:04, 14 September 2026 (UTC)

Cohen Conrad Bramall (born 2 April 1996) is an English professional footballer who plays as a left back for EFL League One club Milton Keynes Dons.

He played non-league football for several years before joining Arsenal in 2017. He spent the 2017–18 season on loan to Birmingham City of the Championship. After Arsenal released him in 2019, he joined Colchester United, and went on to play for Lincoln City, Rotherham United and Portsmouth before signing for Luton Town in 2025.

== Early life and career ==
=== Early life and career ===
Bramall was born in Crewe, Cheshire. He began his career in non-League football in his local area, with Kidsgrove Athletic, Alsager Town, Nantwich Town, Market Drayton Town – with whom he won the 2015–16 Shropshire Premier Cup in his second spell at the club – and Newcastle Town. In May 2016, he moved to Northern Premier League Premier Division club Hednesford Town. He played on a part-time basis while working at a Bentley car factory.

Bramall was first offered a trial with Championship club Sheffield Wednesday, appearing with their under-23 side in a match. Crystal Palace of the Premier League were also interested in signing him.

=== Arsenal ===
After a short trial, Bramall signed professional forms with Premier League club Arsenal on 9 January 2017. The fee was officially undisclosed, but was widely reported as around £40,000. He spent the remainder of the season playing for the club's under-23 side. In July, Bramall joined the first-team squad for Arsenal's pre-season tour of Australia and China, making his senior debut in a friendly against A-League side Sydney FC.

On 21 August 2017, Bramall and Arsenal teammate Carl Jenkinson were loaned to Championship club Birmingham City until the end of the season. On Bramall's return to Arsenal, he played three times for their under-21 team in the 2018–19 EFL Trophy, and the club confirmed he would be released when his contract expired at the end of the season.

==== Birmingham City (loan) ====
Bramall made his senior professional debut the next day in Birmingham's starting eleven for their EFL Cup match against Bournemouth. He played 78 minutes in a 2–1 defeat. He made his first Football League appearance in Birmingham's next match, playing the whole of a 2–0 defeat at home to Reading. That was his last appearance until December, when, with central defenders Harlee Dean suspended and Marc Roberts injured, he started at left wing-back in a 1–0 loss away to Fulham.

Despite speculation that the loan might be cut short in the January transfer window, he remained at the club, and returned to the league team on 3 February, as a substitute for the injured Jonathan Grounds in a 3–1 win away to Sheffield Wednesday. He was involved in an incident for which Wednesday's Marco Matias was sent off for violent conduct. Former referee Mark Halsey said afterwards that if there had been a dismissable offence, it was committed by Bramall, and Matias' red card was rescinded on appeal. Bramall played in two more Championship matches in February, but those were his last.

=== Colchester United ===
Bramall signed a two-year contract with League Two club Colchester United on 2 August 2019. He made his debut for the club the following day in Colchester's 1–1 home draw with Port Vale. He was sent off for the first time in his professional career on 13 August for violent conduct during Colchester's 3–0 win against Swindon Town in the EFL Cup. He scored his first professional goal with a well taken free kick in Colchester's 3–0 win over Carlisle United on 21 December 2019.

=== Lincoln City ===
On 1 February 2021, he joined Lincoln City for an undisclosed fee, signing a multi-year contract. He made his debut coming off the bench against Hull City on 9 February 2021. On the opening day of the 2021–22 season, Bramall was subject to alleged racist abuse from a fan during the game against Gillingham. A man from Gillingham was later arrested on suspicion of assault and an additional allegation of racial abuse was being looked into. On 8 February 2022, he scored his first goal for the club, against Morecambe.

=== Rotherham United ===
On 1 July 2022, Bramall joined Rotherham United after his release clause was met. He scored his first goal for the club on 25 October 2022 in a 2–2 draw against Coventry City.

=== Portsmouth ===
On 31 January 2025, Bramall joined Championship club Portsmouth for an undisclosed fee on a short-term deal until the end of the season. He was released upon the expiration of his short-term deal.

=== Luton Town ===
On 1 August 2025, Bramall joined League One side Luton Town. He scored his first goal for Luton in an EFL Trophy tie against Barnet on 2 September 2025. On 8 May 2026, the club said the player would leave in the summer once his contract had expired.

=== Milton Keynes Dons ===
On 3 July 2026, Bramall joined League One side Milton Keynes Dons, reuniting with former Rotherham manager Paul Warne. He made his debut on 8 August 2026 in a 4–1 EFL Cup first round defeat away to Norwich City.

== Career statistics ==
As of match played 12 September 2026

Club	Season	League			FA Cup		EFL Cup		Other		Total	
Club	Season	Division	Apps	Goals	Apps	Goals	Apps	Goals	Apps	Goals	Apps	Goals
Hednesford Town	2016–17	NPL Premier Division	21	0	1	1	—		4 (Note: Three appearances in FA Trophy, one in Birmingham Senior Cup)	0	26	1
Arsenal	2017–18	Premier League	0	0	—		—		—		0	0
Arsenal	2018–19	Premier League	0	0	0	0	0	0	0	0	0	0
Arsenal	Total		0	0	0	0	0	0	0	0	0	0
Arsenal U21	2018–19	—			—		—		3 (Note: Appearance(s) in EFL Trophy)	0	3	0
Birmingham City (loan)	2017–18	Championship	5	0	2	0	1	0	—		8	0
Colchester United	2019–20	League Two	24	1	1	0	4	0	3 (Note: One appearance in EFL Trophy, two appearances and one goal in League Two play-offs)	1	32	2
Colchester United	2020–21	League Two	23	0	1	0	1	0	0	0	25	0
Colchester United	Total		47	1	2	0	5	0	3	1	57	2
Lincoln City	2020–21	League One	17	0	—		—		1	0	18	0
Lincoln City	2021–22	League One	29	2	2	0	1	0	4	0	36	2
Lincoln City	Total		46	2	2	0	1	0	5	0	54	2
Rotherham United	2022–23	Championship	39	1	1	0	2	0	0	0	42	1
Rotherham United	2023–24	Championship	36	1	1	0	2	0	0	0	39	1
Rotherham United	2024–25	League One	16	0	1	0	1	0	3	0	21	0
Rotherham United	Total		91	2	3	0	5	0	3	0	102	2
Portsmouth	2024–25	Championship	12	0	—		—		—		12	0
Luton Town	2025–26	League One	30	2	1	0	1	0	3	1	35	3
Milton Keynes Dons	2026–27	League One	6	0	0	0	1	0	0	0	7	0
Career total			258	7	11	1	14	0	21	2	304	10

== Honours ==
Market Drayton Town

- Shropshire Premier Cup: 2015–16
