= Carl Jenkinson =

English footballer (born 1992)

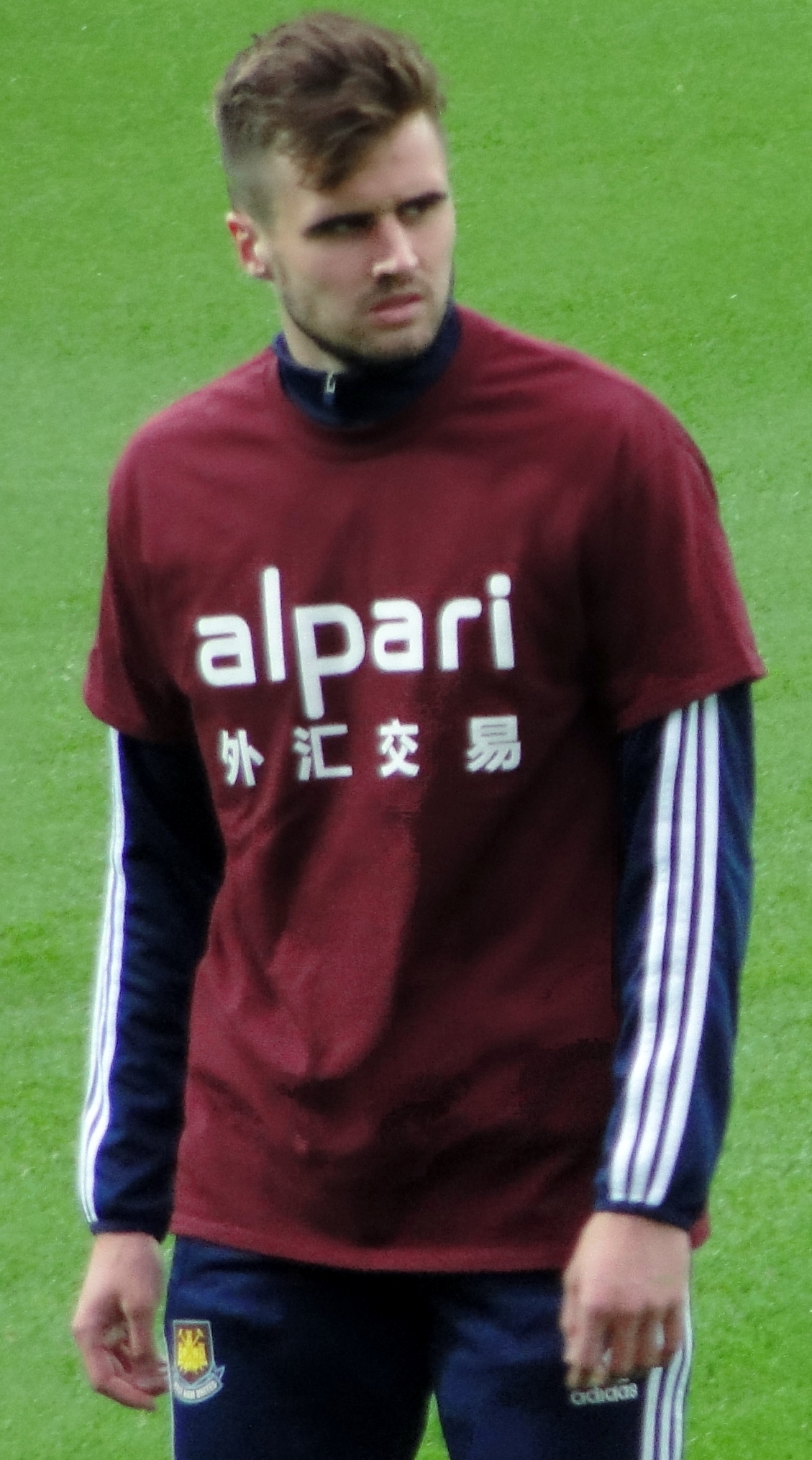
- Jenkinson warming up for West Ham United in 2014

Personal information
- Full name: Carl Daniel Jenkinson
- Date of birth: 8 February 1992 (age 34)
- Place of birth: Harlow, England
- Height: 6 ft 1 in (1.85 m)
- Position: Right-back

Youth career
- –2010: Charlton Athletic

Senior career*
Years	Team	Apps	(Gls)
2010–2011	Charlton Athletic	8	(0)
2010	→ Welling United (loan)	10	(0)
2010	→ Eastbourne Borough (loan)	4	(0)
2011–2019	Arsenal	41	(1)
2014–2016	→ West Ham United (loan)	52	(2)
2017–2018	→ Birmingham City (loan)	7	(0)
2019–2022	Nottingham Forest	11	(0)
2022	→ Melbourne City (loan)	22	(2)
2022–2024	Newcastle Jets	32	(0)
2024–2026	Bromley	16	(0)
Total		203	(5)

International career
2008	England U17	1	(0)
2010	Finland U19	3	(1)
2011	Finland U21	1	(0)
2013–2015	England U21	14	(2)
2012	England	1	(0)
- * Club domestic league appearances and goals

Carl Daniel Jenkinson (born 8 February 1992) is an English former professional footballer who played as a right-back.

Jenkinson began his career with Charlton Athletic before joining Arsenal in 2011. He spent the 2014–15 and 2015–16 seasons on loan at West Ham United, but his second spell was cut short by a mid-season cruciate ligament injury. He spent the 2017–18 season on loan to Championship club Birmingham City. He represented both England and Finland at youth level before making his debut for the senior England team in 2012.

== Club career ==
=== Charlton Athletic ===
Jenkinson joined Charlton Athletic as a six-year-old, and took up a scholarship in 2008. He joined Conference South club Welling United on work experience terms in January 2010, and made ten league appearances.

He signed his first professional contract in 2010, and was named in a Charlton squad for the first time for their 4–3 League Cup defeat away to Shrewsbury Town in August. In November, he started a three-month loan with Conference Premier club Eastbourne Borough. He made five appearances in the first month, including a man-of-the-match performance in the FA Trophy against Boreham Wood, before being recalled by Charlton. He went straight into the starting eleven at right-back for the Football League Trophy Southern Section semi-final clash with Brentford at Griffin Park, and played the whole match as Brentford won the penalty shoot-out after a goalless draw. Jenkinson was given his Football League debut by Chris Powell on 15 February 2011; he replaced Simon Francis after 52 minutes of a 2–1 League One defeat at Hartlepool United. He made seven more league appearances that season, all as a starter.

=== Arsenal ===
==== 2011–12 season ====
Jenkinson signed for Arsenal in June 2011, for an undisclosed fee thought to be around £1 million.

On 16 August, he made his competitive debut in the final qualifying round of the UEFA Champions League against Udinese, as a 55th-minute substitute for the injured left-back Johan Djourou. He made his Premier League debut against Liverpool, four days later, starting at right-back. Jenkinson kept his place in the team, starting in the second leg against Udinese and then in an eventful Premier League fixture against Manchester United at Old Trafford. He crossed for Robin van Persie to score Arsenal's second goal of a match that United won 8–2, but was sent off three minutes later for a second yellow card. According to The Guardian's player ratings, he had "no protection in front of him, no guidance to the side of him and gave a hapless display as a consequence." Jenkinson played regularly after Bacary Sagna broke a leg in October, but suffered a stress fracture in his lower back which kept him out for three months. He made his return in the North London Derby against Tottenham Hotspur on 26 February 2012, playing the last 15 minutes of a 5–2 victory, but appeared only twice more in what remained of the season.

==== 2012–13 season ====
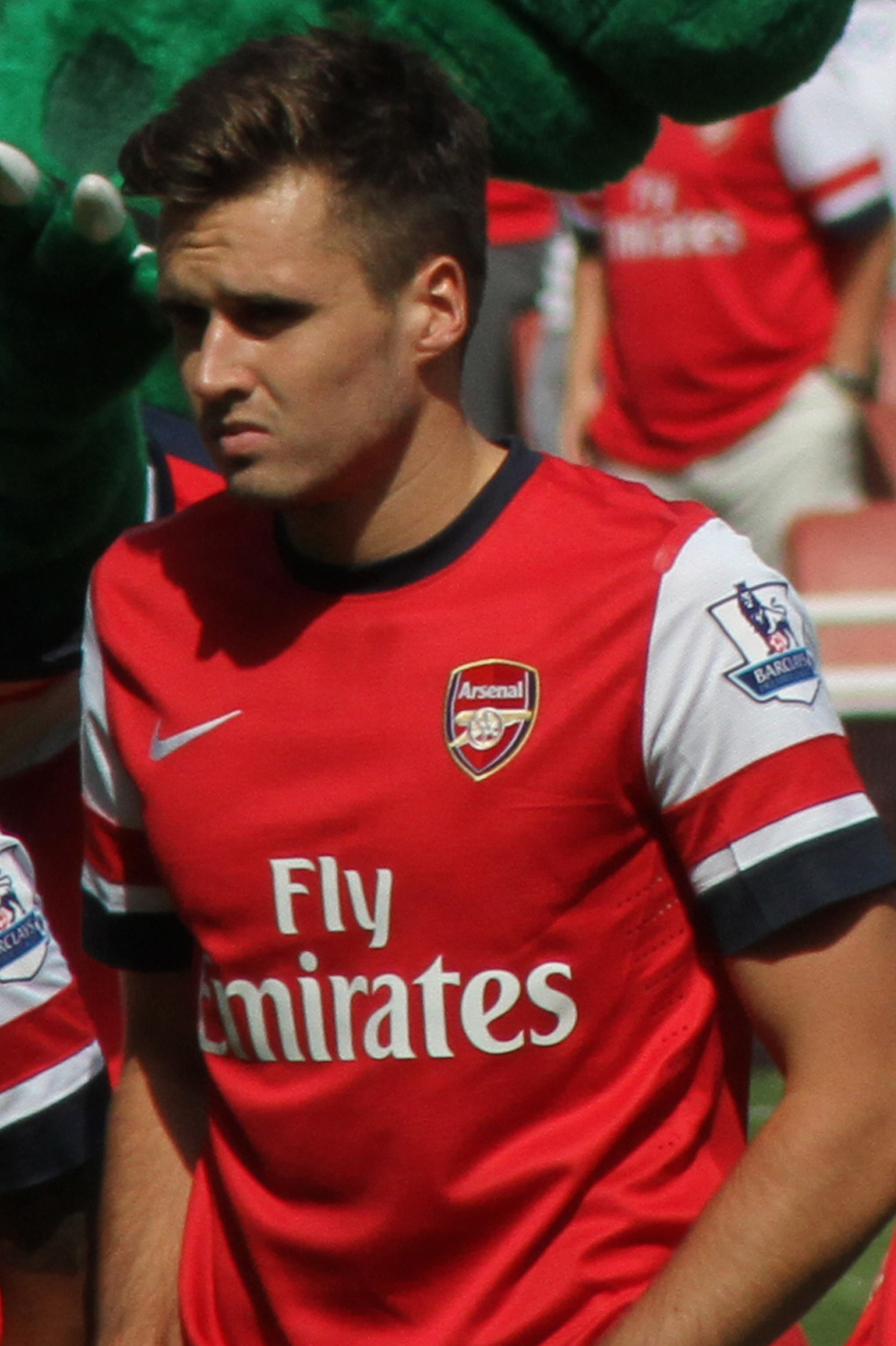
Jenkinson playing for Arsenal in 2012

With Sagna still unavailable through injury, Jenkinson was a regular starter in the first couple of months of the 2012–13 season. His performances improved, earning appreciation from teammates, media, and England manager Roy Hodgson.

Jenkinson and teammates Alex Oxlade-Chamberlain, Kieran Gibbs, Aaron Ramsey and Jack Wilshere all signed new long-term contracts with Arsenal in December 2012. He made only six more appearances in the rest of the season; in one of the six, a 1–0 win away to Sunderland on 9 February which he started only because Laurent Koscielny was injured in the warm-up, he was sent off after being booked twice for a "lunge" on Jack Colback and a "clumsy challenge" on Stéphane Sessègnon.

On 13 March, Jenkinson played the full 90 minutes as Arsenal beat Bayern Munich at the Allianz Arena.

==== 2013–14 season ====
Jenkinson featured in all three of Arsenal's opening matches of the 2013–14 season as injuries to defenders Thomas Vermaelen and Koscielny forced Sagna to fill in at centre-back and Jenkinson to deputise at right-back. Despite Koscielny later returning, Jenkinson kept his place in the first-team after impressing against Fenerbahçe.

On 11 May 2014, Jenkinson scored his first senior team goal for Arsenal in their 2–0 victory over Norwich City on the last day of the 2013–14 season.

In a campaign where Arsenal won their first trophy since 2005, Jenkinson played the full 90 minutes in the FA Cup matches against Coventry and Liverpool whilst he appeared as a substitute in the quarter final victory against Everton.

==== West Ham United loans ====
On 31 July 2014, Jenkinson joined fellow London-based top-flight club West Ham United for a season-long loan deal. He suffered a pre-season hamstring injury in August, in a match in the Schalke 04 Cup against Málaga, and did not make his debut for West Ham until 15 September, in a 2–2 away draw against Hull City. Jenkinson quickly established himself as the team's first-choice right-back and impressed pundits and fans with his consistent displays and good form.

After signing a new long-term contract with Arsenal in July 2015, Jenkinson rejoined West Ham United on loan for a second season. On 15 August, he played in goal for the final moments of a 2–1 home defeat to Leicester City when Adrián had been sent off with no substitutions remaining. A week later, Jenkinson himself was sent off for a foul on Max Gradel in a 4–3 home defeat to AFC Bournemouth. He scored his first West Ham goal on 3 October in a 2–2 away draw against Sunderland. With West Ham losing 2–0 in first-half added time, he scored from Victor Moses' cross to make the score 2–1. Jenkinson suffered a "significant" knee injury on 23 January 2016, after clashing with Sergio Agüero in a home 2–2 draw against Manchester City. It was confirmed as an ACL injury, and Jenkinson returned to Arsenal for rehabilitation.

==== 2016–17 season ====
Before the opening match of the 2016–17 season, Arsène Wenger stated that Jenkinson was expected to be fit for first-team action in November. He made his first appearance for Arsenal since 2014 slightly ahead of schedule, on 25 October, starting at right-back in the team's 2–0 League Cup win over Reading. He received plaudits for his performance which was focused more on attack than defence and he had a chance early on to open the scoring. Jenkinson played in four matches in November, but after the last – the League Cup quarter-final loss to Southampton in which he made an error that cost Arsenal a goal and his substitution was cheered by Arsenal fans – Wenger suggested that he lacked confidence and needed to regain his competitiveness away from the spotlight. Jenkinson himself disagreed, and concluded that if he was out of the team, he needed to move to a club where he would play regularly. In the January 2017 transfer window, a fee was agreed for a permanent move to Crystal Palace, managed by Sam Allardyce with whom Jenkinson had worked at West Ham, but the player could not agree personal terms. He remained at Arsenal for the rest of the season, but did not play for the first team.

==== 2017–18 season: Birmingham City loan ====
On 21 August 2017, Jenkinson and fellow Arsenal full-back Cohen Bramall joined Championship club Birmingham City on loan for the 2017–18 season. He was given squad number 22. Jenkinson hoped that regular football would restart his stagnating career. After half an hour of his debut, playing at right-back five days later at home to Reading, Jenkinson dislocated a shoulder in a collision with teammate Michael Morrison and was expected to be "out long-term". He made his return to the first team when he started the FA Cup tie against Huddersfield Town on 27 January 2018, and earned a league start two weeks later, replacing the injured Jonathan Grounds. After five more starts, he lost his place, new manager Garry Monk preferring the inexperienced but promising Wes Harding.

==== 2018–19 season ====
Jenkinson remained at Arsenal at the start of the 2018–19 season, the final year of his contract with the club. Under new head coach Unai Emery, Jenkinson made eight appearances across all competitions.

Arsenal did not concede a single goal whilst Jenkinson was on the pitch in their last three UEFA Europa League group stage matches against Sporting CP, Vorskla and Qarabag.

On 27 February, he started his first Premier League match for Arsenal in 830 days, playing the full 90 minutes in a 5–1 win over Bournemouth at the Emirates Stadium.

=== Nottingham Forest ===
On 7 August 2019, Jenkinson signed a three-year deal with Championship club Nottingham Forest for an undisclosed fee. He featured irregularly for Forest under both Sabri Lamouchi and Chris Hughton, being used mainly as a rotation option. At the end of the 2020–21 season, Jenkinson was told that he was not in Hughton's plans and was free to leave the club.

On 19 January 2022, Jenkinson joined Australian A-League side Melbourne City on loan until the end of the season. On 10 June 2022, Nottingham Forest announced Jenkinson would be leaving the club once his contract expired.

==== Melbourne City loan ====
Jenkinson made his first A-League appearance as a substitute against Central Coast Mariners. He scored his first goal for the club less than 20 minutes after coming on to replace Kerrin Stokes.

On 18 February, Jenkinson scored again, this time against Newcastle Jets. Jenkinson played in all of the remaining fixtures as Melbourne City finished the season as 'Premiers'.

Melbourne City crashed out of the 2022 AFC Champions League despite being undefeated in the group stage. Jenkinson scored one goal in six matches, against Jeonnam Dragons.

=== Newcastle Jets ===
In August 2022, Jenkinson signed for A-League side Newcastle Jets on a two-year contract.

=== Bromley ===
On 27 September 2024, Jenkinson signed for League Two side Bromley during the 2024–25 season. He was allocated the number six shirt.

On 14 May 2026, it was announced that Jenkinson would leave Bromley following the expiration of his contract.

=== Retirement ===
On 16 August 2026, Jenkinson announced his retirement from professional football.

== International career ==
Jenkinson has an English father and a Finnish-Swede mother, and represented both England and Finland at youth international level.

Jenkinson played for England at under-17 level, but then switched his allegiances to Finland at under-18 level. He was part of the team that competed at the 2010 Granatkin Memorial tournament, at which he made three appearances and captained the team in the 1–0 defeat by Ukraine. He also made an appearance for the Finland under-21 team on 3 June 2011 in a 2013 European Championship qualifying match that resulted in a 0–0 draw with Malta.

In October 2012, England manager Roy Hodgson confirmed that Jenkinson had trained with the senior team prior to their World Cup qualifier against Poland, after fellow right-back Kyle Walker withdrew, and that the player had elected to make himself available for England rather than Finland in future, despite the increased competition for places. He made his senior debut for England on 14 November, as a 74th-minute substitute for Glen Johnson in a 4–2 friendly defeat against Sweden.

In October 2013, Jenkinson was first called up to the England U21 squad for European Championship qualifiers against Lithuania and San Marino. He kept his place in the squad for the following qualifiers, one of which was against his former team Finland U21, a match in which he started.

== Personal life ==
Jenkinson was born in Harlow, Essex, to an English father, Steve, and a Finnish-Swedish mother, Hayde; he has an older brother, Marc. He was raised in Buckhurst Hill, and attended Davenant Foundation School in nearby Loughton. Jenkinson is a boyhood Arsenal fan, and attended matches with his father and brother.

== Career statistics ==
=== Club ===
As of match played 7 March 2026

Appearances and goals by club, season and competition
Club	Season	League			National cup (Note: Includes FA Cup, Australia Cup)		League cup (Note: Includes Football League/EFL Cup)		Continental		Other		Total	
Club	Season	Division	Apps	Goals	Apps	Goals	Apps	Goals	Apps	Goals	Apps	Goals	Apps	Goals
Charlton Athletic	2009–10	League One	0	0	0	0	0	0	—		0	0	0	0
Charlton Athletic	2010–11	League One	8	0	0	0	0	0	—		1 (Note: Appearance in Football League Trophy)	0	9	0
Charlton Athletic	Total		8	0	0	0	0	0	—		1	0	9	0
Welling United (loan)	2009–10	Conference South	10	0	—		—		—		—		10	0
Eastbourne Borough (loan)	2010–11	Conference Premier	4	0	—		—		—		1 (Note: Appearance in FA Trophy)	0	5	0
Arsenal	2011–12	Premier League	9	0	0	0	1	0	4 (Note: Appearances in UEFA Champions League)	0	—		14	0
Arsenal	2012–13	Premier League	14	0	1	0	1	0	5	0	—		21	0
Arsenal	2013–14	Premier League	14	1	3	0	2	0	3	0	—		22	1
Arsenal	2014–15	Premier League	0	0	0	0	0	0	0	0	—		0	0
Arsenal	2015–16	Premier League	0	0	0	0	0	0	0	0	—		0	0
Arsenal	2016–17	Premier League	1	0	0	0	2	0	2	0	—		5	0
Arsenal	2017–18	Premier League	0	0	0	0	0	0	0	0	—		0	0
Arsenal	2018–19	Premier League	3	0	1	0	1	0	3 (Note: Appearance(s) in UEFA Europa League)	0	—		8	0
Arsenal	Total		41	1	5	0	7	0	17	0	—		70	1
West Ham United (loan)	2014–15	Premier League	32	0	4	0	0	0	—		—		36	0
West Ham United (loan)	2015–16	Premier League	20	2	1	0	1	0	1	0	—		23	2
West Ham United (loan)	Total		52	2	5	0	1	0	1	0	—		59	2
Birmingham City (loan)	2017–18	Championship	7	0	2	0	0	0	—		—		9	0
Nottingham Forest	2019–20	Championship	8	0	1	0	1	0	—		—		10	0
Nottingham Forest	2020–21	Championship	3	0	2	0	0	0	—		—		5	0
Nottingham Forest	2021–22	Championship	0	0	0	0	0	0	—		—		0	0
Nottingham Forest	Total		11	0	3	0	1	0	—		—		15	0
Melbourne City (loan)	2021–22	A-League Men	22	2	—		—		6 (Note: Appearances in AFC Champions League)	1	—		28	3
Newcastle Jets	2022–23	A-League Men	23	0	0	0	—		—		—		23	0
Newcastle Jets	2023–24	A-League Men	9	0	2	0	—		—		—		11	0
Newcastle Jets	Total		32	0	2	0	—		—		—		34	0
Bromley	2024–25	League Two	11	0	1	0	0	0	—		1 (Note: Appearance in EFL Trophy)	0	13	0
Bromley	2025–26	League Two	5	0	0	0	0	0	—		0	0	5	0
Bromley	Total		16	0	1	0	0	0	—		1	0	18	0
Career total			203	5	18	0	9	0	24	1	3	0	257	6

=== International ===
As of match played 14 November 2012

Appearances and goals by national team and year
National team	Year	Apps	Goals
England	2012	1	0
Total		1	0

== Honours ==
Arsenal

- FA Cup: 2013–14
- UEFA Europa League runner-up: 2018–19

Melbourne City

- A-League Men Premiership: 2021–22

Bromley

- EFL League Two: 2025–26
