= 2017–18 Birmingham City F.C. season =

Birmingham City F.C.
2017–18 season
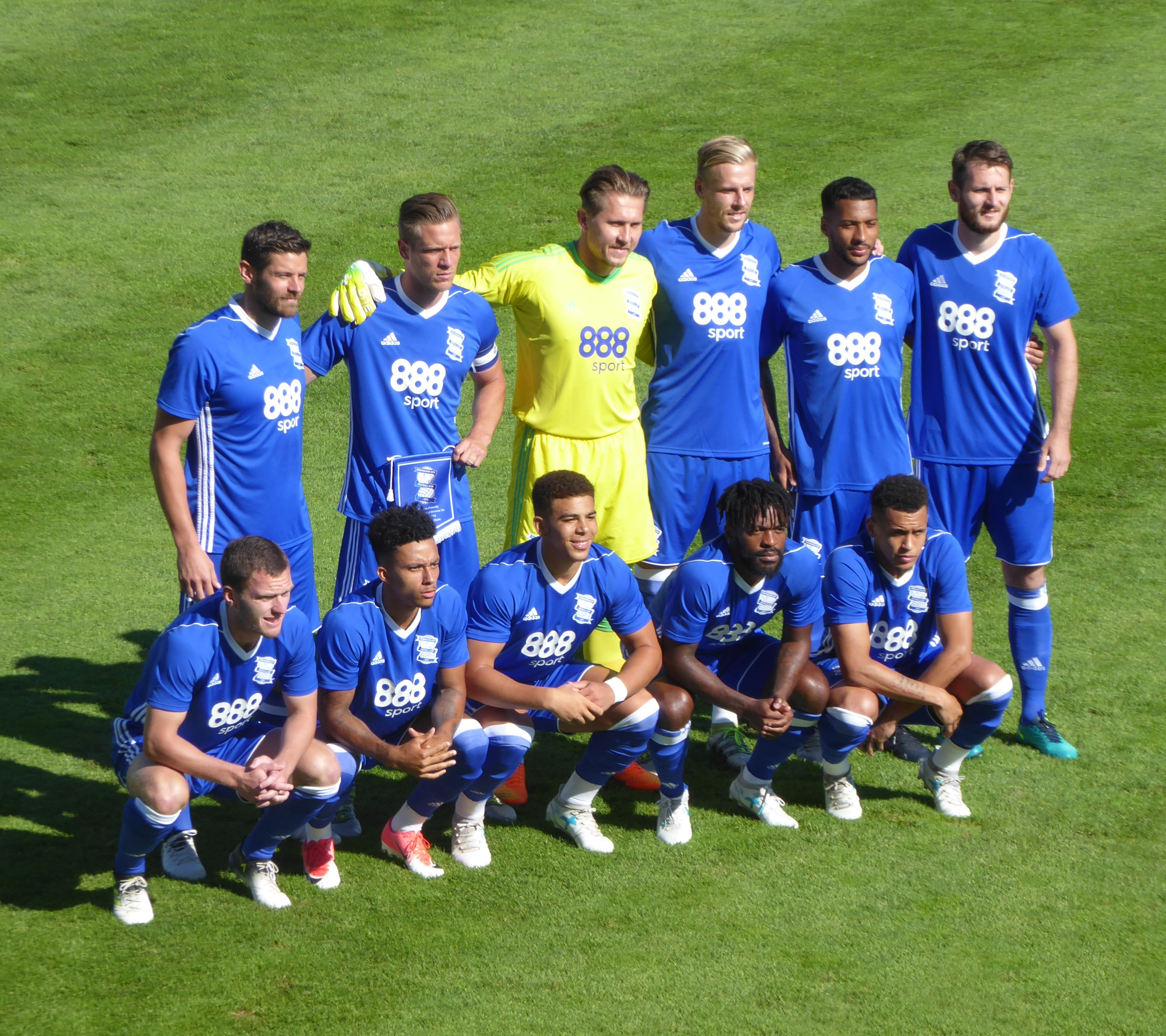
- Back, l–r: Jutkiewicz, Michael Morrison, Kuszczak, Roberts, Davis, Grounds. Front, l–r: Gardner, Dacres-Cogley, Adams, Maghoma, Ravel Morrison
- Owner: Trillion Trophy Asia
- Manager: Harry Redknapp; (until 16 September 2017); Lee Carsley (caretaker); Steve Cotterill; (2 October 2017 – 3 March 2018); Garry Monk (from 4 March 2018)
- Stadium: St Andrew's
- Championship: 19th
- FA Cup: Fourth round (eliminated by Huddersfield Town)
- EFL Cup: Second round (eliminated by AFC Bournemouth)
- Top goalscorer: League: Sam Gallagher (6); All: Che Adams (9)
- Highest home attendance: 27,608 (vs Fulham, 6 May 2018)
- Lowest home attendance: 7,623 (vs Burton Albion, FA Cup 3rd round, 6 January 2018)
- Average home league attendance: 21,041
| Home colours | Away colours | Third colours |

The 2017–18 season is Birmingham City Football Club's 115th season in the English football league system and seventh consecutive season in the second-tier Championship. For the second season running, they finished in 19th place after going into the final day still in danger of relegation. As with all English Football League clubs, the first team also competed in the FA Cup, in which they lost in a fourth-round replay to Huddersfield Town, and in the EFL Cup, from which they were eliminated by AFC Bournemouth in the second round.

After a poor start to the season, with only one win from the first eight matches, and only two weeks after the close of the transfer window, during which he was allowed to bring in 13 new players, Harry Redknapp was sacked as manager. He was succeeded by Steve Cotterill, who was dismissed after five months, having failed to take the team clear of potential relegation. Garry Monk was appointed on 4 March to become Birmingham's fifth permanent manager in 15 months.

Thirty-five players made at least one appearance in first-team competition, of whom five were loan signings; there were thirteen different goalscorers. Winger Jacques Maghoma appeared in 44 of the club's 51 fixtures over the season Che Adams was top scorer overall, with 9 goals in all competitions, and in league matches, Sam Gallagher top scored with just 6. The average league attendance, of 21,041, was some 12% up on 2016–17.

The season covers the period from 1 July 2017 to 30 June 2018.

== Background and pre-season ==
Having led the team to tenth-place finishes in the previous two seasons, with the team lying just outside the play-off positions, and two days after three new directors had joined the board, manager Gary Rowett and his backroom staff were sacked on 14 December 2016. Later that day, former West Ham United and Watford manager Gianfranco Zola was announced as Rowett's successor. After four months, during which the team won just twice and dropped to 20th place, three points outside the relegation zone with three matches remaining, Zola resigned, to be replaced by Harry Redknapp, initially to the end of the season. Needing to win their final match if Blackburn Rovers and Nottingham Forest both won their final fixture – which they did – Birmingham won 1–0 away to Bristol City to avoid relegation and finish in 19th place.

The club appointed Jeff Vetere as director of football, and Redknapp agreed to stay on as manager for another year. His backroom staff included Kevin Bond as assistant manager, Paul Groves as first-team coach, Kevin Hitchcock as goalkeeping coach, and former Birmingham player Lee Carsley as head professional development coach. Summer signings for 2017–18 included goalkeeper David Stockdale, whose part in Brighton & Hove Albion's promotion to the Premier League earned him selection for the PFA Championship Team of the Year, Barnsley's captain and centre back Marc Roberts, and midfielder Craig Gardner, whose loan from West Bromwich Albion was made permanent. Five attacking midfielders left: Kerim Frei returned to Turkey with Süper Lig runners-up İstanbul Başakşehir, Greg Stewart, Andrew Shinnie and Diego Fabbrini left on season-long loans, and Viv Solomon-Otabor left on loan until January.

The home kit consists of a blue shirt with white trim at the neck and white stripes down the side seams, white shorts with blue trim and blue stripes down the side seams, and blue socks with white trim at the turnover. The away kit reverses the colours of the home kit. The kits are supplied by Adidas and bear the logo of the club's principal sponsor, online bookmaker 888sport.

After a training camp in Stegersbach, Austria, during which they played friendly matches against German second-tier club 1. FC Union Berlin and Hapoel Ironi Kiryat Shmona of the Israeli Premier League, Birmingham City's first-team pre-season programme continued with visits to Oxford United and Kidderminster Harriers and a home fixture against Swansea City.

Pre-season match details
| Date | Opponents | Venue | Result | Score F–A | Scorers | Attendance | Refs |
|---|---|---|---|---|---|---|---|
| 11 July 2017 | 1. FC Union Berlin | N | L | 0–1 | | 450 | |
| 15 July 2017 | Hapoel Ironi Kiryat Shmona | N | W | 2–0 | Maghoma 18', Frei 60' | | |
| 22 July 2017 | Oxford United | A | W | 2–0 | Davis 9', Adams 29' | 3,507 | |
| 26 July 2017 | Kidderminster Harriers | A | D | 1–1 | Donaldson 32' | 2,387 | |
| 29 July 2017 | Swansea City | H | L | 0–2 | | 6,188 | |

== Month-by-month season review ==
=== August ===
Birmingham City opened their 2017–18 EFL Championship season away to Ipswich Town, without injured striker Lukas Jutkiewicz, unsettled centre-back Ryan Shotton, and club captain Paul Robinson, who was serving the final instalment of a three-match ban. The team lined up in a 4–4–2 formation with David Stockdale in goal, Emilio Nsue and Jonathan Grounds at full back, Michael Morrison (captain) and Marc Roberts at centre back, Cheikh Ndoye alongside Craig Gardner in central midfield, David Davis and Jacques Maghoma as wide midfielders, and Che Adams and Clayton Donaldson in the forward line. Birmingham had the better of the first half, but early in the second, Ipswich were "perhaps fortunate" that Jordan Spence was not sent off for a professional foul on Donaldson and promptly broke forward for Joe Garner to score the only goal of the match. Without centre-back Aden Flint, a transfer target for Birmingham, Bristol City took the lead in the second minute of their visit to St Andrew's; Gardner equalised after half an hour. Davis, who was suffering from a virus, and the injured Grounds were replaced at half-time by Maikel Kieftenbeld and Robinson; 15 minutes later, Adams' hamstring injury gave winger David Cotterill a first league appearance for Birmingham since January. Maghoma "displayed a brilliant piece of individual finishing", and despite Kieftenbeld's sending off for a mistimed tackle – which was rescinded on appeal – the ten men held on for the win.

A goalless draw with Bolton Wanderers at St Andrew's was marked by the inclusion of Ryan Shotton, despite a reportedly imminent transfer to Middlesbrough, first in the matchday squad and then on the field after Morrison suffered a facial injury, and a "quiet" debut for former Luton Town striker Isaac Vassell. Redknapp said afterwards that he couldn't claim to have enjoyed the match, that "it was almost the same team which struggled to stay up last season and that is a big worry", and if the club failed to sign some quality players it would be "another tough season". Wearing a mask to protect his broken nose and damaged cheekbone, Morrison started the televised visit to Burton Albion and Shotton, whose wife had recently given birth, was left out entirely. Donaldson's cross was knocked down by Jutkiewicz for Maghoma to tap in against his former club, but after the break, Birmingham conceded two well-worked goals to lose to Burton for the third time in three attempts. Redknapp was vitriolic afterwards, accusing the players of having "ruined Zola last year", of failing to "win any battles", criticising "four or five of them" for disappearing, and stating that what he needs "is to change a lot of them because that's not good enough." Before the next fixture, three loanees arrived from Premier League clubs: inexperienced full-back Cohen Bramall and England international defender Carl Jenkinson, both from Arsenal, and Southampton striker Sam Gallagher. All three started at home to Reading. Jenkinson dislocated his shoulder after half an hour, and a 2–0 defeat left Birmingham 20th in the table going into the international break.

Six more players joined before the transfer window closed: centre-back Harlee Dean, full-back Maxime Colin and – for a club record fee – Spanish winger Jota, all from Brentford, free-agent midfielder Jason Lowe, late of Blackburn Rovers, and two young loanee midfielders, Everton's Liam Walsh and Jérémie Boga, who made his Premier League debut for Chelsea early in the season. An attempt to sign former Arsenal midfielder Alex Song from Rubin Kazan fell through. Robert Tesche and Cheick Keita left the club on season-long loans. In permanent departures, Shotton completed his move to Middlesbrough, Donaldson joined Sheffield United, and, after bids for midfield partner Davis were rejected, Kieftenbeld was reported to have signed for Derby County. However, the league refused to ratify the transfer because of problems with the documentation. After the window closed, the club issued a statement talking up the financial contribution made by the owners to support the manager: "Blues have undergone a major transformation, with the owners showing the ambition and providing resources to help create an exciting, new-look side under Redknapp".

=== September ===
September began with three more hamstring injuries, to Adams, Jota and Lowe, and three successive defeats – away to Norwich City with six debutants in the starting eleven, away to Leeds United, a result that took the hosts top of the table, and at home to Preston North End, which left Birmingham 23rd in the table. Just hours after the match, the board issued a statement:

Unfortunately due to the poor start to the campaign which sees the club second from bottom of the Championship, we are left with no choice but to terminate the contract of the manager with immediate effect.

Redknapp said that, despite the frustrations of the amount of injuries and by the failure to sign some of his primary transfer targets, he was enjoying his work, believed he would have brought success to the club, and was disappointed that he was given no more than a week with the new players to prove it.

Under the caretaker management of development coach and former Birmingham midfielder Lee Carsley, and despite a wrist injury to Stockdale that was expected to keep him out for some weeks, the losing streak ended after a 1–1 draw with Gary Rowett's Derby County; they took a second-half lead via Jutkiewicz's first touch, but could not hold on to the lead. At home to Sheffield Wednesday, Vassell's first goal for Birmingham gave them their second win of the season. On 29 September, Steve Cotterill, who worked with Redknapp in the final three games of the 2016–17 season, signed a two-and-a-half-year contract as Birmingham's fourth permanent manager in ten months. He watched Carsley oversee Hull City end a five-match winless run by beating Birmingham 6–1 – Gallagher's stoppage-time goal was his first for the club – before formally taking charge on 2 October.

=== October ===
Cotterill began his tenure with a home fixture against top-of-the-table Cardiff City. Ahead of the match, he commented that the large size of the squad made it "awkward" to omit players whose training performances would normally justify their inclusion on matchday. He made several changes to the team, recalling Kieftenbeld – for the first time since his transfer to Derby fell through – Grounds, Roberts and Adams, and naming Vassell as a lone striker in a 4–2–3–1 formation with Ndoye in the middle of the three. After Adams gave the team a 19th-minute lead "with a low, right-foot shot after a superb mazy run", they had chances to extend their advantage against a Cardiff team that had no shots on target. In contrast, what Cotterill described as a tentative start to the televised visit to Millwall allowed the hosts to gain and keep the advantage in a 2–0 win. The final October fixture was the Second City derby at home to Aston Villa. In a misguided attempt to boost the atmosphere inside the stadium, the club distributed cardboard "clappers" in the home fans' areas; unsurprisingly, they were thrown onto the pitch during the match. The resulting controversy, which included Daily Mail columnist Martin Samuel advocating closure of the ground, overshadowed an entertaining but goalless draw in which both teams had chances – Jota shot over the bar when clean through with only the goalkeeper to beat – and both sets of fans united in applause in support of the victims of the 1974 Birmingham pub bombings. The month ended with confirmation that Isaac Vassell had ruptured a cruciate ligament during the Villa match and was unlikely to be back before the end of the season.

=== November ===
Four points from a possible fifteen during November established Birmingham in and around 21st place in the table. They scored only twice. Adams' early goal and "a succession of fine saves" by Kuszczak gave Birmingham a home win against Nottingham Forest, and away to Sheffield United, a corner was cleared to Boga who took a couple of steps forward before "thumping a curling effort" past the goalkeeper from outside the penalty area; the hosts equalised in the second half to restrict Birmingham to just their second away point of the season. Three 2–0 defeats completed the league return: at home to Brentford and away to Barnsley and Middlesbrough.

=== December ===
Three defeats by the odd goal, in the second of which, in front of more than 4000 travelling supporters at Fulham, Boga hit a 75th-minute penalty well over the bar, left Birmingham bottom of the table. Cotterill received a vote of confidence from the directors before the visit to Sunderland, in which Gallagher opened the scoring and was then sent off for two yellow cards, and Birmingham's determined defending with ten men earned them a draw. The point left them still bottom, three points adrift of safety; as the Birmingham Mail pointed out, for the past eight seasons, the team bottom of the Championship at Christmas had been relegated. With only Jutkiewicz of the senior strikers available for the visit of Norwich City, Birmingham conceded in each half and failed to score. In the final fixture of 2017, at home to fifth-placed Leeds United, Maghoma's late goal gave Birmingham their first win in eight matches. With relegation rivals Bolton and Sunderland both winning and Burton Albion drawing, Birmingham remained at the foot of the table going into the transfer window.

=== January ===
The new year began with another win, away to Reading. Maghoma opened the scoring, continuing a run of form that the local paper was to describe as "the best football of his Blues career", and Gallagher's fourth goal for the club gave Birmingham a 2–0 win. Cotterill thought his team were improving: "We are learning, we are fitter, we are more organised and we are settled now." Two opponents were booked for bad fouls on Maghoma and Grounds hit the post twice at home to Derby County, but the visitors won 3–0. Maghoma's assist for Gallagher allowed Birmingham to earn a draw at Preston North End, and another assist, this time for Boga's header, contributed to a 3–1 victory at home to relegation rivals Sunderland before an injury forced his substitution; the third goal was Gallagher's fifth in seven league matches. January's results earned Cotterill a nomination for the EFL Championship Manager of the Month award: according to the rationale, "never has his ebullience and self-confidence been more fiercely tested. Seven points from four games to move out of the bottom three say that he is winning the battle."

Cotterill said that Birmingham's approach to the January transfer window would be "strategic": they would not be paying over the odds, and would be interested in loans. He went into the transfer window "close to landing two new additions", but three weeks later, after releasing David Cotterill and selling Nsue to APOEL FC, he was discussing more outgoings and the implications of Financial Fair Play. By the time the window closed, Stephen Gleeson had left for Ipswich, Che Adams had not left, Kieftenbeld and Grounds had signed contract extensions – Maghoma would do the same a few days later – but there were no additions.

=== February–March ===
Despite Maghoma's absence, the winning run continued at Sheffield Wednesday – who had two men sent off – via Davis's second goal in consecutive matches and Jota's first goals for the club. Jonathan Grounds, the team's only senior left back, suffered a badly torn medial knee ligament during the match and was expected to be out for the rest of the season. Going into the visit to Aston Villa, the mood was positive, but the hosts extended their winning streak to seven league matches with a 2–0 result. Cotterill's "hope that this was a one-off" proved unfounded. With a midfield weakened by the absence of Kieftenbeld, serving a two-match ban for accumulated yellow cards, and Davis injured, Birmingham lost the next three matches, conceding eight goals and scoring none. The results included a 5–0 defeat at Brentford, and a 2–0 loss at home to Barnsley, during which Cotterill was given a police escort off the field and objects including a plastic bottle were thrown at him. He spoke of the players "look[ing] frightened to play at home".

During the following week, the parent company released their accounts for the six months ending December 2017: they showed a loss of £17.8 million loss – more than in the previous twelve months. Holding company chairman Zhao Wenqing flew to England for talks. Cotterill outlined the past two months from his viewpoint, and described Zhao as "incredibly supportive". A fifth successive defeat, by 2–1 at Nottingham Forest on 3 March, preceded the dismissal that same day of not only Cotterill, but also the coaching staff and senior sports science staff inherited from previous incumbents, as well as director of football Jeff Vetere. The board's statement expressed "great regret and sadness" at the decision, and commended Cotterill's professionalism, work ethic and honesty.

The Daily Telegraph reported that "Birmingham's transfer activity was allegedly disrupted by an ongoing row between two key figures in the boardroom, leaving Cotterill unable to make any additions", that chief executive Xuandong Ren's position was in doubt, and that agent Darren Dein, who held a consultancy role with the owners, had been "marginalised". Channel 5's Football on 5 pundit Chris Iwelumo commented on the adverse effects of lack of communication between the club's ownership and its other stakeholders, and felt that a new manager might face the same problems as his predecessors if the infrastructure remained unchanged. The Birmingham Mail's Brian Dick recognised that "Cotterill had a little more than half a season to effect the positive change Blues are so desperate to see but unfortunately for him it proved too difficult", but noted that "many of the problems and strategic issues that have blighted three previous managers remain. One can only wonder if Harry Houdini could succeed where Harry Redknapp – and now Steve Cotterill have come up short."

The next evening, Birmingham appointed former Swansea City, Leeds United and Middlesbrough manager Garry Monk on a three-and-a-half-year contract as their fifth permanent manager in fifteen months. He was accompanied by members of the backroom staff that had worked with him at some or all of his previous clubs: Pep Clotet as assistant manager, James Beattie (first-team coach), Darryl Flahavan (goalkeeping coach), Sean Rush (head of performance) and Ryan Needs (head of analysis).

=== March–May ===
Monk's first fixture was at home to Middlesbrough, the club from which he was sacked in December. He made two team changes, restoring Jota to the starting eleven after a month out of it and giving Jutkiewicz a first league start of 2018. Although they lost 1–0, the victory putting Middlesbrough back in the playoff positions, Monk's post-match interview highlighted the positives: "I thought we limited their threats very well, so from a defensive point of [view] we were very, very good. When the goal went in I was very pleased with the commitment, the attitude and the passion the players showed today along with a passionate crowd." Away to Cardiff City, Birmingham were 3–0 down by half-time. Monk brought Roberts on for Jenkinson, and the team brought the score back to 3–2, but still finished with their eighth consecutive defeat. In the last match before the international break, played in a snowstorm, Birmingham finally broke the losing streak by beating Hull City 3–0. Monk gave academy product Wes Harding a league debut at right back, chosen ahead of more experienced players because his pace and tenacity would better counteract the threat from Hull's wingers.

Birmingham beat Ipswich Town 1–0 courtesy of Jota's penalty. BBC Sport remarked that "The most noticeable difference since Monk's appointment has been the greater influence of Spanish forward Jota, who struggled for goals following his club-record move from Brentford in August, but has been pivotal in Blues' successive wins either side of the international break." Nearly 5,000 fans travelled to Bolton Wanderers on a Tuesday night to see Jutkiewicz's first league goal in six months give Birmingham another 1–0 win. He also scored in the next two matches but the team gained only one point, through his late equaliser at home to Burton Albion, and a 2–0 defeat away to already-promoted Wolverhampton Wanderers in which Dean was sent off, left them two points above the relegation places with three matches remaining.

Sheffield United's Mark Duffy approached the visit to his former club with the intention of scoring and proving some of its fans wrong. He duly scored after just seven minutes, but his extravagant celebration antagonised the home supporters and disappointed his manager; Birmingham went on to win 2–1. A defeat at Queens Park Rangers, after which Monk said the pressure of avoiding relegation had affected the players so that they showed fear, meant that for the second successive season their fate would be decided on the last day of the season. At home to Fulham, who were on a 23-match unbeaten run and needed to win to have a chance of automatic promotion, Birmingham's performance belied their standing as the division's lowest scorers as they completed a 3–1 win. According to Monk, they produced "what the fans want to see. They want to see commitment and fight and then, on top of that, they want to see some quality, and we had that." They finished in 19th place, the same as in 2016–17, but with seven points fewer.

== Championship ==
=== League table ===
| Pos | Team | Pld | W | D | L | GF | GA | GD | Pts |
|---|---|---|---|---|---|---|---|---|---|
| 17 | Nottingham Forest | 46 | 15 | 8 | 23 | 51 | 65 | −14 | 53 |
| 18 | Hull City | 46 | 11 | 16 | 19 | 70 | 70 | 0 | 49 |
| 19 | Birmingham City | 46 | 13 | 7 | 26 | 38 | 68 | −30 | 46 |
| 20 | Reading | 46 | 10 | 14 | 22 | 48 | 70 | −22 | 44 |
| 21 | Bolton Wanderers | 46 | 10 | 13 | 23 | 39 | 74 | −35 | 43 |

Rules for classification: 1) Points; 2) Goal difference; 3) Number of goals scored

=== Result summary ===
| Overall | | | | | | | | Home | | | | | | Away | | | | | |
| Pld | W | D | L | GF | GA | GD | Pts | W | D | L | GF | GA | GD | W | D | L | GF | GA | GD |
|---|---|---|---|---|---|---|---|---|---|---|---|---|---|---|---|---|---|---|---|
| 46 | 13 | 7 | 26 | 35 | 67 | −32 | 46 | 10 | 3 | 10 | 18 | 23 | −5 | 3 | 4 | 16 | 17 | 44 | −27 |

=== Match results ===
General source: Match content not verifiable from these sources is referenced individually.

| Date | League position | Opponents | Venue | Result | Score F–A | Scorers | Attendance | Refs |
|---|---|---|---|---|---|---|---|---|
| 5 August 2017 | 17th | Ipswich Town | A | L | 0–1 | | 18,153 | |
| 12 August 2017 | 10th | Bristol City | H | W | 2–1 | Gardner 30', Maghoma 74' | 21,269 | |
| 15 August 2017 | 11th | Bolton Wanderers | H | D | 0–0 | | 20,215 | |
| 18 August 2017 | 13th | Burton Albion | A | L | 1–2 | Maghoma 29' | 4,948 | |
| 26 August 2017 | 20th | Reading | H | L | 0–2 | | 19,993 | |
| 9 September 2017 | 21st | Norwich City | A | L | 0–1 | | 26,335 | |
| 12 September 2017 | 22nd | Leeds United | A | L | 0–2 | | 31,507 | |
| 16 September 2017 | 23rd | Preston North End | H | L | 1–3 | Colin 35' | 21,168 | |
| 23 September 2017 | 23rd | Derby County | A | D | 1–1 | Jutkiewicz 64' | 27,392 | |
| 27 September 2017 | 22nd | Sheffield Wednesday | H | W | 1–0 | Vassell 76' | 20,365 | |
| 30 September 2017 | 22nd | Hull City | A | L | 1–6 | Gallagher 90+1' | 15,608 | |
| 13 October 2017 | 19th | Cardiff City | H | W | 1–0 | Adams 19' | 19,059 | |
| 21 October 2017 | 21st | Millwall | A | L | 0–2 | | 14,797 | |
| 29 October 2017 | 21st | Aston Villa | H | D | 0–0 | | 24,408 | |
| 1 November 2017 | 21st | Brentford | H | L | 0–2 | | 19,045 | |
| 4 November 2017 | 22nd | Barnsley | A | L | 0–2 | | 12,946 | |
| 18 November 2017 | 21st | Nottingham Forest | H | W | 1–0 | Adams 5' | 21,071 | |
| 22 November 2017 | 21st | Middlesbrough | A | L | 0–2 | | 22,848 | |
| 25 November 2017 | 21st | Sheffield United | A | D | 1–1 | Boga 38' | 27,427 | |
| 4 December 2017 | 22nd | Wolverhampton Wanderers | H | L | 0–1 | | 19,641 | |
| 9 December 2017 | 22nd | Fulham | A | L | 0–1 | | 19,644 | |
| 16 December 2017 | 24th | Queens Park Rangers | H | L | 1–2 | Gallagher 57' | 20,107 | |
| 23 December 2017 | 24th | Sunderland | A | D | 1–1 | Gallagher 16' | 27,427 | |
| 26 December 2017 | 24th | Norwich City | H | L | 0–2 | | 19,967 | |
| 30 December 2017 | 24th | Leeds United | H | W | 1–0 | Maghoma 83' | 21,673 | |
| 2 January 2018 | 23rd | Reading | A | W | 2–0 | Maghoma 24', Gallagher 64' | 14,491 | |
| 13 January 2018 | 23rd | Derby County | H | L | 0–3 | | 22,121 | |
| 20 January 2018 | 23rd | Preston North End | A | D | 1–1 | Gallagher 63' | 13,529 | |
| 30 January 2018 | 20th | Sunderland | H | W | 3–1 | Davis 28', Boga 44', Gallagher 54' | 19,601 | |
| 3 February 2018 | 19th | Sheffield Wednesday | A | W | 3–1 | Davis 8', Jota 21', 45+5' | 25,648 | |
| 11 February 2018 | 20th | Aston Villa | A | L | 0–2 | | 41,233 | |
| 17 February 2018 | 19th | Millwall | H | L | 0–1 | | 19,111 | |
| 20 February 2018 | 20th | Brentford | A | L | 0–5 | | 9,511 | |
| 24 February 2018 | 22nd | Barnsley | H | L | 0–2 | | 19,822 | |
| 3 March 2018 | 22nd | Nottingham Forest | A | L | 1–2 | Morrison 87' | 23,296 | |
| 6 March 2018 | 22nd | Middlesbrough | H | L | 0–1 | | 18,301 | |
| 10 March 2018 | 22nd | Cardiff City | A | L | 2–3 | Gardner 54' pen., Colin 90+5' | 19,634 | |
| 17 March 2018 | 22nd | Hull City | H | W | 3–0 | Jota 12', 59', Adams 48' | 22,970 | |
| 31 March 2018 | 21st | Ipswich Town | H | W | 1–0 | Jota 21' pen. | 20,555 | |
| 3 April 2018 | 21st | Bolton Wanderers | A | W | 1–0 | Jutkiewicz 40' | 21,097 | |
| 7 April 2018 | 20th | Burton Albion | H | D | 1–1 | Jutkiewicz 87' | 22,311 | |
| 10 April 2018 | 20th | Bristol City | A | L | 1–3 | Jutkiewicz 34' | 20,288 | |
| 15 April 2018 | 21st | Wolverhampton Wanderers | A | L | 0–2 | | 29,536 | |
| 21 April 2018 | 20th | Sheffield United | H | W | 2–1 | Roberts 32', Maghoma 69' | 23,579 | |
| 28 April 2018 | 20th | Queens Park Rangers | A | L | 1–3 | Adams 27' | 15,805 | |
| 6 May 2018 | 19th | Fulham | H | W | 3–1 | Jutkiewicz 15', Dean 43', Adams 89' | 27,608 | |

== FA Cup ==
As with all clubs in the top two divisions, Birmingham entered the FA Cup in the third round. Drawn at home to fellow Championship club Burton Albion, Birmingham went through 1–0 in a "scrappy" match after Sam Gallagher ran onto Jacques Maghoma's cross to score his fourth goal in five matches. For the fourth-round tie, both Birmingham and their hosts, Premier League club Huddersfield Town, made seven changes, Cotterill also switching to three at the back with Cohen Bramall and Carl Jenkinson, recently returned to fitness, at wing-back. The match ended 1–1 after Lukas Jutkiewicz took advantage of a defensive mistake to equalise. He also had a header disallowed for what was reported as a "dubious" offside decision, and Huddersfield's Joe Lolley should have won the match in stoppage time.

With a televised home tie against Manchester United and associated £247,000 broadcast fee at stake for the winners, Huddersfield fielded a stronger side for the replay, while Birmingham again made seven changes, playing three at the back and omitting David Davis and Maikel Kieftenbeld – both one yellow card short of a suspension – from the midfield ahead of the weekend's Second City derby. Che Adams opened the scoring for Birmingham after 52 minutes, but the visitors equalised after Tom Ince's shot was parried and Marc Roberts put the ball into his own net while trying to clear. In the first few minutes of extra time, Huddersfield took a 3–1 lead against tiring opponents, and the match finished as a 4–1 defeat. Use of a fourth substitute during extra time of an FA Cup tie, trialled in the later rounds of the 2016–17 edition, was permitted from the first round in 2017–18. The 18-year-old midfielder Charlie Lakin became the first Birmingham player to be used under that arrangement when he made his senior debut, replacing Jason Lowe with 20 minutes left.

FA Cup match details
| Round | Date | Opponents | Venue | Result | Score F–A | Scorers | Attendance | Refs |
|---|---|---|---|---|---|---|---|---|
| Third round | 6 January 2018 | Burton Albion | H | W | 1–0 | Gallagher 56' | 7,623 | |
| Fourth round | 27 January 2018 | Huddersfield Town | A | D | 1–1 | Jutkiewicz 55' | 13,047 | |
| Fourth round replay | 6 February 2018 | Huddersfield Town | H | L | 1–4 aet | Adams 52' | 13,175 | |

== EFL Cup ==
In the first round of the EFL Cup, Birmingham were drawn at home to Crawley Town of League Two. They had little difficulty beating a Crawley side with nine changes from their preceding league match: Che Adams scored his first senior hat-trick, and goals from David Davis and Robert Tesche gave Birmingham a 5–1 win. In the second round, at home to Premier League club AFC Bournemouth, Birmingham lined up in a 3–5–2 formation and gave a debut to loanee Cohen Bramall at left wing-back and a first start to Isaac Vassell. They had the better of the first half, and took the lead after 11 minutes when Jonathan Grounds headed a corner down to the unmarked Maikel Kieftenbeld who tapped in. After Vassell beat defenders for pace, turned the goalkeeper and rolled the ball towards goal, Tyrone Mings was able to get back to clear. Vassell was replaced through injury at half-time, Bournemouth equalised a minute later, the momentum switched, and a defensive lapse allowed Marc Pugh to score the winner after 68 minutes.

EFL Cup match details
| Round | Date | Opponents | Venue | Result | Score F–A | Scorers | Attendance | Refs |
|---|---|---|---|---|---|---|---|---|
| First round | 8 August 2017 | Crawley Town | H | W | 5–1 | Adams 27', 42', 66', Davis 38', Tesche 49' | 7,814 | |
| Second round | 22 August 2017 | AFC Bournemouth | H | L | 1–2 | Kieftenbeld 11' | 8,245 | |

== Transfers ==
=== In ===
| Date | Player | Club† | Fee | Refs |
|---|---|---|---|---|
| 1 July 2017 | Craig Gardner | West Bromwich Albion | Undisclosed | |
| 1 July 2017 | Marc Roberts | Barnsley | Undisclosed | |
| 1 July 2017 | David Stockdale | (Brighton & Hove Albion) | Free | |
| 13 July 2017 | Cheikh Ndoye | (Angers) | Free | |
| 14 August 2017 | Isaac Vassell | Luton Town | Undisclosed | |
| 30 August 2017 | Harlee Dean | Brentford | Undisclosed | |
| 31 August 2017 | Maxime Colin | Brentford | Undisclosed | |
| 31 August 2017 | Jota | Brentford | Undisclosed (Note: Confirmed as a club record, in excess of the £6 million paid for Nikola Žigić in 2010.) | |
| 31 August 2017 | Jason Lowe | (Blackburn Rovers) | Free | |

† Brackets round a club's name indicate the player's contract with that club had expired before he joined Birmingham.

=== Loan in ===
| Date | Player | Club | Return | Refs |
|---|---|---|---|---|
| 21 August 2017 | Cohen Bramall | Arsenal | End of season | |
| 21 August 2017 | Sam Gallagher | Southampton | End of season | |
| 21 August 2017 | Carl Jenkinson | Arsenal | End of season | |
| 28 August 2017 | Jérémie Boga | Chelsea | End of season | |
| 31 August 2017 | Liam Walsh | Everton | 3 January 2018 | |

=== Out ===
| Date | Player | Club† | Fee | Refs |
|---|---|---|---|---|
| 21 July 2017 | Kerim Frei | İstanbul Başakşehir | Undisclosed | |
| 8 August 2017 | Adam Legzdins | Burnley | Undisclosed | |
| 30 August 2017 | Ryan Shotton | Middlesbrough | Undisclosed | |
| 31 August 2017 | Clayton Donaldson | Sheffield United | Undisclosed | |
| 19 December 2017 | David Cotterill | (ATK) | Mutual consent | |
| 8 January 2018 | Emilio Nsue | APOEL | Undisclosed | |
| 8 January 2018 | David Popa | UTA Arad | Mutual consent | |
| 19 January 2018 | Stephen Gleeson | Ipswich Town | Free | |
| 19 January 2018 | Dan Cleary | (Dundalk) | Mutual consent | |
| 1 June 2018 | Andrew Shinnie | Luton Town | Free | |
| 8 June 2018 | Jason Lowe | Bolton Wanderers | Free | |
| 30 June 2018 | Tai-Reece Chisholm | (Barnsley) | Released | |
| 30 June 2018 | Jordan Clarke | | Released | |
| 30 June 2018 | Tyrell Hamilton | (AFC Bournemouth) | Released | |
| 30 June 2018 | Wes McDonald | (Yeovil Town) | Released | |
| 30 June 2018 | Olly Mulders | (Stourport Swifts) | Released | |
| 30 June 2018 | Paul Robinson | | Retired | |
| 30 June 2018 | Jack Storer | (Partick Thistle) | Released | |
| 30 June 2018 | Matthew Timms | | Released | |
| 1 July 2018 | Robert Tesche | (VfL Bochum) | Released | |

† Brackets round a club's name denote the player joined that club after his Birmingham City contract expired.

=== Loan out ===
| Date | Player | Club | Return | Refs |
|---|---|---|---|---|
| 27 June 2017 | Greg Stewart | Aberdeen | End of season | |
| 30 June 2017 | Andrew Shinnie | Luton Town | End of season | |
| 26 July 2017 | Dan Cleary | Solihull Moors | 2 January 2018 | |
| 26 July 2017 | Viv Solomon-Otabor | Blackpool | End of season | |
| 26 July 2017 | Connal Trueman | Solihull Moors | Recalled 22 September 2017 | |
| 27 July 2017 | Diego Fabbrini | Real Oviedo | 30 June 2018 | |
| 31 August 2017 | Cheick Keita | Bologna | End of season | |
| 31 August 2017 | Dan Scarr | Wycombe Wanderers | End of season | |
| 31 August 2017 | Robert Tesche | VfL Bochum | End of season | |
| 14 September 2017 | Wes McDonald | Solihull Moors | 14 October 2017 | |
| 15 September 2017 | Luke Maxwell | Gateshead | 17 December 2017 | |
| 5 October 2017 | Jack Storer | Gloucester City | Short-term | |
| 23 November 2017 | Olly Mulders | Mickleover Sports | 30 June 2018 | |
| 23 November 2017 | Matthew Timms | Mickleover Sports | 30 December 2017 | |
| 24 November 2017 | Kyle McFarlane | Nuneaton Town | 2 January 2018 | |
| 22 December 2017 | Jack Storer | Solihull Moors | 18 January 2018 | |
| 3 January 2018 | Ronan Hale | Derry City | 30 June 2018 | |
| 18 January 2018 | Nicolai Brock-Madsen | Cracovia | 30 June 2018 | |

== Appearances and goals ==
Numbers in parentheses denote appearances made as a substitute.
Players marked † left the club during the playing season.
Players with names in italics and marked * were on loan from another club for the whole of their season with Birmingham.
Players listed with no appearances have been in the matchday squad but only as unused substitutes.
Key to positions: GK – Goalkeeper; DF – Defender; MF – Midfielder; FW – Forward

Players' appearances and goals by competition
| No. | Pos. | Nat. | Name | League | | FA Cup | | EFL Cup | | Total | | Discipline | |
| No. | Pos. | Nat. | Name | Apps | Goals | Apps | Goals | Apps | Goals | Apps | Goals | A yellow rectangle, denoting the yellow penalty card shown to a player being cautioned | A red rectangle, denoting the red penalty card shown to a player being sent off |
|---|---|---|---|---|---|---|---|---|---|---|---|---|---|
| 2 | DF | EQG | Emilio Nsue † | 15 (3) | 0 | 0 | 0 | 2 | 0 | 17 (3) | 0 | 0 | 0 |
| 3 | DF | ENG | Jonathan Grounds | 26 | 0 | 1 (1) | 0 | 2 | 0 | 29 (1) | 0 | 6 | 0 |
| 4 | DF | ENG | Marc Roberts | 26 (4) | 1 | 3 | 0 | 2 | 0 | 30 (4) | 1 | 4 | 0 |
| 5 | DF | ENG | Ryan Shotton † | 0 (1) | 0 | 0 | 0 | 1 | 0 | 1 (1) | 0 | 1 | 0 |
| 5 | DF | FRA | Maxime Colin | 35 | 2 | 1 | 0 | 0 | 0 | 36 | 2 | 3 | 0 |
| 6 | MF | NED | Maikel Kieftenbeld | 33 (2) | 0 | 1 | 0 | 2 | 1 | 36 (2) | 1 | 12 | 1 |
| 7 | MF | GER | Robert Tesche | 0 | 0 | 0 | 0 | 0 (1) | 1 | 0 (1) | 1 | 0 | 0 |
| 8 | MF | ENG | Craig Gardner | 20 (6) | 2 | 2 (1) | 0 | 0 (1) | 0 | 22 (8) | 2 | 2 | 0 |
| 9 | FW | JAM | Clayton Donaldson † | 4 | 0 | 0 | 0 | 0 | 0 | 4 | 0 | 0 | 0 |
| 10 | FW | ENG | Lukas Jutkiewicz | 19 (16) | 5 | 2 | 1 | 0 (1) | 0 | 21 (17) | 6 | 0 | 0 |
| 11 | FW | ENG | Isaac Vassell | 3 (6) | 1 | 0 | 0 | 1 | 0 | 4 (6) | 1 | 0 | 0 |
| 12 | DF | ENG | Harlee Dean | 34 | 1 | 3 | 0 | 0 | 0 | 37 | 1 | 10 | 2 |
| 13 | GK | ENG | David Stockdale | 36 | 0 | 3 | 0 | 0 | 0 | 39 | 0 | 1 | 0 |
| 14 | FW | ENG | Che Adams | 16 (14) | 5 | 2 | 1 | 1 | 3 | 19 (14) | 9 | 1 | 1 |
| 15 | DF | ENG | Cohen Bramall * | 3 (2) | 0 | 2 | 0 | 1 | 0 | 6 (2) | 0 | 0 | 0 |
| 17 | MF | SEN | Cheikh Ndoye | 28 (9) | 0 | 2 (1) | 0 | 0 | 0 | 30 (10) | 0 | 6 | 1 |
| 18 | FW | ENG | Sam Gallagher * | 23 (10) | 6 | 1 | 1 | 0 | 0 | 24 (10) | 7 | 5 | 1 |
| 19 | MF | COD | Jacques Maghoma | 32 (9) | 5 | 1 | 0 | 2 | 0 | 35 (9) | 5 | 3 | 0 |
| 20 | MF | CIV | Jérémie Boga * | 24 (7) | 2 | 1 (2) | 0 | 0 | 0 | 25 (9) | 2 | 0 | 0 |
| 21 | MF | ENG | Jason Lowe | 6 (3) | 0 | 2 | 0 | 0 | 0 | 8 (3) | 0 | 3 | 0 |
| 22 | DF | ENG | Carl Jenkinson * | 7 | 0 | 2 | 0 | 0 | 0 | 9 | 0 | 1 | 0 |
| 23 | MF | WAL | David Cotterill † | 2 (5) | 0 | 0 | 0 | 1 | 0 | 3 (5) | 0 | 0 | 0 |
| 24 | MF | ENG | Liam Walsh * † | 1 (2) | 0 | 0 | 0 | 0 | 0 | 1 (2) | 0 | 1 | 0 |
| 25 | DF | ENG | Josh Dacres-Cogley | 1 (2) | 0 | 0 (2) | 0 | 0 | 0 | 1 (4) | 0 | 0 | 0 |
| 26 | MF | ENG | David Davis | 33 (5) | 2 | 1 | 0 | 2 | 1 | 36 (5) | 3 | 14 | 0 |
| 27 | FW | ESP | Jota | 24 (8) | 5 | 1 (1) | 0 | 0 | 0 | 25 (9) | 5 | 1 | 0 |
| 28 | DF | ENG | Michael Morrison | 33 | 1 | 2 | 0 | 0 | 0 | 35 | 1 | 10 | 0 |
| 29 | GK | POL | Tomasz Kuszczak | 10 | 0 | 0 | 0 | 2 | 0 | 12 | 0 | 0 | 0 |
| 30 | DF | IRL | Corey O'Keeffe | 0 | 0 | 0 | 0 | 0 | 0 | 0 | 0 | 0 | 0 |
| 33 | DF | MLI | Cheick Keita | 0 (1) | 0 | 0 | 0 | 0 | 0 | 0 (1) | 0 | 0 | 0 |
| 39 | GK | ENG | Connal Trueman | 0 | 0 | 0 | 0 | 0 | 0 | 0 | 0 | 0 | 0 |
| 40 | DF | ENG | Paul Robinson | 0 (2) | 0 | 0 | 0 | 1 (1) | 0 | 1 (3) | 0 | 0 | 0 |
| 44 | FW | DEN | Nicolai Brock-Madsen | 0 | 0 | 0 | 0 | 0 | 0 | 0 | 0 | 0 | 0 |
| 45 | DF | ENG | Wes Harding | 9 | 0 | 0 | 0 | 0 (2) | 0 | 9 (2) | 0 | 2 | 0 |
| 46 | DF | ENG | Steve Seddon | 0 | 0 | 0 | 0 | 0 | 0 | 0 | 0 | 0 | 0 |
| 47 | MF | ENG | Charlie Lakin | 0 | 0 | 0 (1) | 0 | 0 | 0 | 0 (1) | 0 | 0 | 0 |
| 48 | MF | ENG | Odin Bailey | 0 | 0 | 0 | 0 | 0 | 0 | 0 | 0 | 0 | 0 |
| 49 | FW | COD | Beryly Lubala | 0 (1) | 0 | 0 | 0 | 0 | 0 | 0 (1) | 0 | 0 | 0 |
| 50 | MF | IRL | Stephen Gleeson † | 3 (2) | 0 | 0 | 0 | 2 | 0 | 5 (2) | 0 | 0 | 0 |

Players not included in matchday squads
| No. | Pos. | Nat. | Name |
|---|---|---|---|
| 1 | GK | ENG | Adam Legzdins † |
