= 2022–23 Rotherham United F.C. season =

Rotherham United
2022–23 season
- Chairman: Tony Stewart
- Manager: Paul Warne (until 22 September); Matt Taylor (from 4 October)
- Stadium: New York Stadium
- Championship: 19th
- FA Cup: Third round
- EFL Cup: Second round
- Top goalscorer: League: Chiedozie Ogbene (8); All: Chiedozie Ogbene (9)
- Highest home attendance: 11,517 vs Stoke City, 26 December 2022, Championship
- Lowest home attendance: 3,808 vs Morecambe, 23 August 2022, EFL Cup
Home colours	Away colours	Third colours

The 2022–23 season was the 98th season in the existence of Rotherham United Football Club and the club's first season back in the Championship since the 2020–21 season, following their promotion from League One last season. In addition to the league, they also competed in the 2022–23 FA Cup and the 2022–23 EFL Cup.

== Players ==
=== Current squad ===
As of 9 May 2023.

Note: Flags indicate national team as defined under FIFA eligibility rules; some limited exceptions apply. Players may hold more than one non-FIFA nationality.

No.	Pos.	Nation	Player
1	GK	SWE	Viktor Johansson
2	DF	JAM	Wes Harding
3	DF	ENG	Cohen Bramall
4	MF	IRL	Conor Coventry (on loan from West Ham United)
6	DF	ENG	Richard Wood (captain)
7	MF	GHA	Tariqe Fosu (on loan from Brentford)
8	MF	ENG	Ben Wiles
9	FW	ENG	Tom Eaves
10	FW	ENG	Jordan Hugill
11	MF	IRL	Chiedozie Ogbene
12	FW	IRL	Georgie Kelly
14	FW	NIR	Conor Washington
16	MF	SCO	Jamie Lindsay
17	DF	NIR	Shane Ferguson
18	MF	ENG	Oliver Rathbone
20	DF	ENG	Grant Hall (on loan from Middlesbrough)
21	DF	ENG	Lee Peltier

No.	Pos.	Nation	Player
22	MF	ENG	Hakeem Odoffin
23	DF	ENG	Sean Morrison
24	DF	ENG	Cameron Humphreys
26	GK	SCO	Robbie Hemfrey
28	DF	AUS	Bailey Wright (on loan from Sunderland)
29	DF	NOR	Leo Hjelde (on loan from Leeds United)
30	DF	IRL	Peter Kioso
31	GK	ENG	Josh Vickers
34	MF	ENG	Curtis Durose
35	MF	ENG	Hamish Douglas
36	MF	ENG	Joel Holvey
40	MF	POR	Domingos Quina (on loan from Watford)
42	DF	ENG	Tyler Blackett
—	FW	ENG	Jerome Greaves
—	DF	ENG	Nathan Exton
—	MF	ENG	Samuel Greenhouse

=== Out on loan ===
Note: Flags indicate national team as defined under FIFA eligibility rules; some limited exceptions apply. Players may hold more than one non-FIFA nationality.

No.	Pos.	Nation	Player
5	DF	SCO	Jamie McCart (on loan at Leyton Orient until end of the season)
15	DF	ENG	Tolaji Bola (on loan at Bradford City until end of the season)
19	FW	IRL	Joshua Kayode (on loan at MK Dons until end of the season)

No.	Pos.	Nation	Player
25	DF	ENG	Jake Hull (on loan at Buxton until end of the season)
32	MF	ENG	Mack Warne (on loan at Bridlington Town until end of the season)
33	FW	NIR	Ciaran McGuckin (on loan at Scarborough Athletic until end of the season)

== Squad statistics ==
=== Player statistics ===
As of final game of the season, 8 May 2023.

Players with zero appearances have been unused substitutes in one or more games.

No.	Pos.	Nat.	Name	Total		League		FA Cup		EFL Cup		Other		Discipline	
No.	Pos.	Nat.	Name	Apps	Goals	Apps	Goals	Apps	Goals	Apps	Goals	Apps	Goals	Yellow card	Red card
1	GK	(Sweden)	Viktor Johansson	44	0	43	0	1	0	0	0	0	0	3	0
26	GK	(Scotland)	Robbie Hemfrey	0+1	0	0+1	0	0	0	0	0	0	0	0	0
31	GK	(England)	Josh Vickers	5	0	3	0	0	0	2	0	0	0	0	0
2	DF	(Jamaica)	Wes Harding	35+11	1	33+10	1	1	0	1+1	0	0	0	9	0
3	DF	(England)	Cohen Bramall	30+12	1	27+12	1	1	0	2	0	0	0	9	1
5	DF	(Scotland)	Jamie McCart	3+7	0	1+6	0	0+1	0	2	0	0	0	0	0
6	DF	(England)	Richard Wood	22+8	4	21+7	4	1	0	0+1	0	0	0	3	0
15	DF	(England)	Tolaji Bola	0+2	0	0+2	0	0	0	0	0	0	0	0	0
20	DF	(England)	Grant Hall	19+2	0	18+2	0	0	0	1	0	0	0	5	0
21	DF	(England)	Lee Peltier	32+4	1	30+4	1	0	0	2	0	0	0	7	0
23	DF	(England)	Sean Morrison	2	0	2	0	0	0	0	0	0	0	0	0
24	DF	(England)	Cameron Humphreys	36+4	0	35+3	0	1	0	0+1	0	0	0	6	0
25	DF	(England)	Jake Hull	0	0	0	0	0	0	0	0	0	0	0	0
28	DF	(Australia)	Bailey Wright	5+2	0	5+2	0	0	0	0	0	0	0	0	0
29	DF	(Norway)	Leo Hjelde	11+2	0	11+2	0	0	0	0	0	0	0	5	0
30	DF	(Republic of Ireland)	Peter Kioso	7+5	0	5+5	0	1	0	1	0	0	0	0	0
42	DF	(England)	Tyler Blackett	3+3	0	3+3	0	0	0	0	0	0	0	0	0
4	MF	(Republic of Ireland)	Conor Coventry	16	0	16	0	0	0	0	0	0	0	3	0
7	MF	(Ghana)	Tarique Fosu	15+4	1	15+4	1	0	0	0	0	0	0	1	0
8	MF	(England)	Ben Wiles	24+3	2	24+3	2	0	0	0	0	0	0	4	0
11	MF	(Republic of Ireland)	Chiedozie Ogbene	36+6	9	36+3	8	0+1	0	0+2	1	0	0	3	0
16	MF	(Scotland)	Jamie Lindsay	21+18	2	19+17	2	1	0	1+1	0	0	0	2	0
17	MF	(Northern Ireland)	Shane Ferguson	21+12	3	20+11	3	1	0	0+1	0	0	0	2	0
18	MF	(England)	Oliver Rathbone	35+6	5	32+6	4	1	0	2	1	0	0	10	0
22	MF	(England)	Hakeem Odoffin	16+9	4	15+8	4	1	0	0+1	0	0	0	5	0
32	MF	(England)	Mack Warne	0	0	0	0	0	0	0	0	0	0	0	0
34	MF	(England)	Curtis Durose	0	0	0	0	0	0	0	0	0	0	0	0
35	MF	(England)	Hamish Douglas	0	0	0	0	0	0	0	0	0	0	0	0
36	MF	(England)	Joel Holvey	0+1	0	0+1	0	0	0	0	0	0	0	0	0
40	MF	(Portugal)	Domingos Quina	3+5	0	3+5	0	0	0	0	0	0	0	2	1
9	FW	(England)	Tom Eaves	6+15	0	5+15	0	0	0	1	0	0	0	3	0
10	FW	(England)	Jordan Hugill	18	5	18	5	0	0	0	0	0	0	4	0
12	FW	(Republic of Ireland)	Georgie Kelly	5+26	4	3+26	4	0	0	2	0	0	0	1	0
14	FW	(Northern Ireland)	Conor Washington	22+15	6	20+15	5	1	1	1	0	0	0	1	0
19	FW	(Republic of Ireland)	Joshua Kayode	0+1	0	0	0	0	0	0+1	0	0	0	0	0
Players who left the club during the season
4	MF	(England)	Daniel Barlaser	29+2	2	28	2	0+1	0	1+1	0	0	0	4	0
10	DF	(England)	Brooke Norton-Cuffy	15+6	0	14+6	0	0	0	1	0	0	0	4	0
7	MF	(Scotland)	Scott High	3+12	0	1+12	0	0	0	2	0	0	0	0	0

=== Goalscorers ===
As of final game of season, 8 May 2023.

Place	Position	Nation	Number	Name	Total	League	FA Cup	EFL Cup	Other
1	MF	(Republic of Ireland)	11	Chiedozie Ogbene	9	8	0	1	0
2	FW	(Northern Ireland)	14	Conor Washington	6	5	1	0	0
3	FW	(England)	10	Jordan Hugill	5	5	0	0	0
=	MF	(England)	18	Oliver Rathbone	5	4	0	1	0
5	DF	(England)	6	Richard Wood	4	4	0	0	0
=	FW	(Republic of Ireland)	12	Georgie Kelly	4	4	0	0	0
=	MF	(England)	22	Hakeem Odoffin	4	4	0	0	0
8	DF	(Northern Ireland)	17	Shane Ferguson	3	3	0	0	0
9	MF	(England)	4	Dan Barlaser	2	2	0	0	0
=	MF	(England)	8	Ben Wiles	2	2	0	0	0
=	MF	(Scotland)	16	Jamie Lindsay	2	2	0	0	0
12	DF	(Jamaica)	2	Wes Harding	1	1	0	0	0
=	DF	(England)	3	Cohen Bramall	1	1	0	0	0
=	MF	(Ghana)	7	Tarique Fosu	1	1	0	0	0
=	DF	(England)	21	Lee Peltier	1	1	0	0	0

== Pre-season and friendlies ==
On 18 May 2022, Crewe Alexandra confirmed a home pre-season fixture (for 23 July) with Rotherham United; though the match was later removed from the Crewe's original press release. A day later it was confirmed Paul Warne would take his side overseas to Croatia for a warm-weather training camp in July. The Millers announced their first pre-season fixture against Parkgate. A second followed six days later, against Doncaster Rovers. A trip to Salford City was also added to the pre-season calendar. Harrogate Town was next added to the pre-season calendar. A fifth away friendly was also confirmed, against Mansfield Town. Millers' final friendly was announced to be against Crewe Alexandra on 23 July. A behind-closed-doors meeting against Fleetwood Town in Croatia was confirmed in July.

Win Draw Loss Fixtures

1 July 2022 Friendly	Parkgate	2–4	Rotherham United	Parkgate
19:00 BST	Tracey 48'; Rippon 70'	Report	Bola 19'; Kelly 36'; Ayres 78'; Washington 86'	Stadium: Roundwood

7 July 2022 Friendly	Fleetwood Town	0–2	Rotherham United	Pula, Croatia
19:00 CEST		Report	Kelly 20', 60' (pen.)	Stadium: Park Plaza; Attendance: 0 (behind-closed-doors)

12 July 2022 Friendly	Harrogate Town	0–3	Rotherham United	Harrogate
19:00 BST		Report	Odoffin 9'; Barlaser 12'; McGuckin 76'	Stadium: EnviroVent Stadium; Attendance: 869; Referee: Tom Nield

13 July 2022 Friendly	Salford City	1–1	Rotherham United	Salford
19:00 BST	McAleny 15'	Report	Kayode 90+1'	Stadium: Peninsula Stadium

16 July 2022 Friendly	Mansfield Town	1–1	Rotherham United	Mansfield
15:00 BST	Oates 85'	Report	Kayode 60'	Stadium: One Call Stadium; Attendance: 2,440; Referee: Josh Smith

19 July 2022 Friendly	Doncaster Rovers	2–2	Rotherham United	Doncaster
19:00 BST	Miller 11', 58'	Report	Odoffin 16'; Kelly 77'	Stadium: Eco-Power Stadium

23 July 2022 Friendly	Crewe Alexandra	1–2	Rotherham United	Crewe
15:00 BST	Agyei 40'	Report	Washington 1'; Kelly 39'	Stadium: Mornflake Stadium

== Competitions ==
=== Overall record ===
Competition	First match	Last match	Starting round	Final position	Record							
Competition	First match	Last match	Starting round	Final position	Pld	W	D	L	GF	GA	GD	Win %
Championship	30 July 2022	8 May 2023	Matchday 1	19th	46	11	17	18	49	60	−11	23.91
FA Cup	7 January 2023	7 January 2023	Third round	Third round	1	0	0	1	1	4	−3	0.00
EFL Cup	10 August 2022	23 August 2022	First round	Second round	2	1	0	1	2	2	+0	50.00
Total					49	12	17	20	52	66	−14	24.49

Last updated: 8 May 2023
Source: FBREF

=== Championship ===
==== League table ====
Pos	Team	Pld	W	D	L	GF	GA	GD	Pts	Promotion, qualification or relegation
16	Stoke City	46	14	11	21	55	54	+1	53	
17	Birmingham City	46	14	11	21	47	58	−11	53	
18	Huddersfield Town	46	14	11	21	47	62	−15	53	
19	Rotherham United	46	11	17	18	49	60	−11	50	
20	Queens Park Rangers	46	13	11	22	44	71	−27	50	
21	Cardiff City	46	13	10	23	41	58	−17	49	
22	Reading (R)	46	13	11	22	46	68	−22	44 (Note: Reading were deducted 6 points for breaching an EFL business plan.)	Relegation to League One

Source: EFL Official Website
Rules for classification: 1) Points; 2) Goal difference; 3) Number of goals scored; 4) Head-to-head results; 5) Wins; 6) Away goals; 7) Penalty points (sec 9.5); 8) 12-point sending off offences
(R) Relegated

==== Results summary ====
Overall								Home						Away					
Pld	W	D	L	GF	GA	GD	Pts	W	D	L	GF	GA	GD	W	D	L	GF	GA	GD
46	11	17	18	49	60	−11	50	9	6	8	37	30	+7	2	11	10	12	30	−18

Last updated: 1 May 2023.
Source: [ Soccerway]

==== Results by round ====
Round	1	2	3	4	5	6	7	8	9	10	11	12	13	14	15	16	17	18	19	20	21	22	23	24	25	26	27	28	29	30	31	32	33	34	35	36	37	38	39	40	41	42	43	44	45	46
Ground	H	H	A	A	H	A	H	H	A	H	H	A	H	A	H	A	A	A	H	A	A	H	A	H	A	A	H	A	H	A	A	H	H	A	H	A	H	A	H	A	H	H	A	H	H	A
Result	D	W	D	D	W	L	D	W	D	L	D	L	W	W	L	D	L	L	L	W	D	L	L	D	L	L	W	D	D	D	L	L	W	D	W	L	L	D	W	D	L	D	L	L	W	D
Position	12	8	10	13	5	12	12	9	8	12	12	17	16	11	11	11	13	14	17	14	16	18	19	19	21	21	19	20	20	20	20	21	20	20	18	20	20	20	18	18	18	18	19	20	19	19

Updated to match(es) played on 1 May 2023. Source: [ Soccerway]
A = Away; H = Home; W = Win; D = Draw; L = Loss; P = Postponed

==== Matches ====
Win Draw Loss Fixtures

On 23 June, the league fixtures were announced.

30 July 2022 1	Rotherham United	1–1	Swansea City	Rotherham
15:00 BST	Ogbene 16'; Bramall (yellow card) 90+3'	Report	Darling 38'; Sorinola (yellow card) 55'; Piroe (yellow card) 80'	Stadium: AESSEAL New York Stadium; Attendance: 10,454; Referee: Matt Donohue

7 August 2022	Coventry City	Postponed	Rotherham United	Coventry
15:00 BST				Stadium: Coventry Building Society Arena
Note: Match was postponed due to playing surface deemed to be unsafe and unplayable.

13 August 2022 2	Rotherham United	4–0	Reading	Rotherham
15:00 BST	Wood 7'; Washington 15'; Lindsay 18'; Ogbene 45+2'	Report	Yiadom (yellow card) 57'; Long (yellow card) 85'	Stadium: New York Stadium; Attendance: 9,263; Referee: Steve Martin

16 August 2022 3	Preston North End	0–0	Rotherham United	Preston
19:45 BST	Storey (yellow card) 90+6'	Report	Bramall (yellow card) 38'; Harding (yellow card) 63'; Johansson (yellow card) 74'	Stadium: Deepdale; Attendance: 14,479; Referee: Oliver Langford

20 August 2022 4	Queens Park Rangers	1–1	Rotherham United	Shepherd's Bush
15:00 BST	Dickie (yellow card) 29'; Willock 43'; Dozzell (yellow card) 64'; Field (yellow card) 74'	Report	Ogbene 33'; Humphreys (yellow card) 64'; Johansson (yellow card) 90+5'	Stadium: Loftus Road Stadium; Attendance: 12,230; Referee: Andy Woolmer

27 August 2022 5	Rotherham United	2–0	Birmingham City	Rotherham
15:00 BST	Wood 28', 71'; Rathbone (yellow card) 40'; Barlaser (penalty missed) 63'	Report	Deeney (yellow card) 41'; James (yellow card) 45+2'	Stadium: New York Stadium; Attendance: 11,027; Referee: Gavin Ward

31 August 2022 6	Sunderland	3–0	Rotherham United	Sunderland
19:45 BST	Stewart 52', 65'; Clarke 70'	Report	Peltier (yellow card) 26'; Norton-Cuffy (yellow card) 51'; Barlaser (yellow card) 54'; Ferguson (yellow card) 67'	Stadium: Stadium of Light; Attendance: 36,530; Referee: Tony Harrington

3 September 2022 7	Rotherham United	1–1	Watford	Rotherham
15:00 BST	Wood 2'; Harding (yellow card) 18'; Peltier (yellow card) 27'; Wiles (yellow card) 32'	Report	Bayo 33'; Asprilla (yellow card) 41'; Kayembe (yellow card) 66'	Stadium: New York Stadium; Attendance: 10,607; Referee: Leigh Doughty

10 September 2022	Sheffield United	Postponed	Rotherham United	Sheffield
15:00 BST				Stadium: Bramall Lane
Note: Fixture was postponed as a mark of respect following the passing of Queen Elizabeth II.

14 September 2022 8	Rotherham United	3–0	Blackpool	Rotherham
19:45 BST	Ogbene 34'; Rathbone (yellow card) 73'; Harding 82'; Kelly 85'	Report	Thorniley (yellow card) 80'	Stadium: New York Stadium; Attendance: 9,105; Referee: Michael Salisbury

17 September 2022 9	Middlesbrough	0–0	Rotherham United	Middlesbrough
19:45 BST	Howson (yellow card) 43'	Report	Humphreys (yellow card) 45+2'; Bramall (yellow card) 80'	Stadium: Riverside Stadium; Attendance: 22,960; Referee: Tim Robinson

1 October 2022 10	Rotherham United	0–2	Wigan Athletic	Rotherham
15:00 BST	Wood (yellow card) 45+1'; Norton-Cuffy (yellow card) 50'; Wiles (yellow card) 52'	Report	Keane 12'; Amos (yellow card) 76'; Naylor 84'	Stadium: New York Stadium; Attendance: 10,761; Referee: Andy Davies

5 October 2022 11	Rotherham United	1–1	Millwall	Rotherham
19:45 BST	Barlaser 9' (pen.); Hall (yellow card) 55'; Eaves (yellow card) 79'	Report	Flemming 42'; Saville (yellow card) 52'; Cooper (yellow card) 60'	Stadium: New York Stadium; Attendance: 8,618; Referee: Dean Whitestone

8 October 2022 12	Blackburn Rovers	3–0	Rotherham United	Blackburn
15:00 BST	Brereton Díaz 21' (pen.) 63'; Szmodics 75'	Report	Hall (yellow card) 20'; Rathbone (yellow card) 54'; Barlaser (yellow card) 90+1'	Stadium: Ewood Park; Attendance: 12,233; Referee: Oliver Langford

15 October 2022 13	Rotherham United	2–1	Huddersfield Town	Rotherham
12:30 BST	Washington 25'; Rathbone (yellow card) 42'; Kelly 61'; Harding (yellow card) 89'; Hall (yellow card) 90+3'	Report	Ward 29'; Holmes (yellow card) 60'; Nakayama (yellow card) 74'	Stadium: New York Stadium; Attendance: 11,006; Referee: Jeremy Simpson

18 October 2022 14	Stoke City	0–1	Rotherham United	Stoke-on-Trent
20:00 BST		Report	Rathbone 6'; Wiles (yellow card) 40'; Hall (yellow card) 45'; Harding (yellow card) 66'	Stadium: Bet365 Stadium; Attendance: 18,036; Referee: Gavin Ward

22 October 2022 15	Rotherham United	2–4	Hull City	Rotherham
15:00 BST	Barlaser 45+2'; Odoffin (yellow card) 49'; Kelly 89'	Report	Greaves 44'; Christie 52'; Longman 59'; Tufan 85'	Stadium: New York Stadium; Attendance: 11,220; Referee: Steve Martin

25 October 2022 16	Coventry City	2–2	Rotherham United	Coventry
19:45 BST	McFadzean (yellow card) 15'; Hamer 76'; Gyökeres (yellow card) 85' (goal) 90+1' (pen.)	Report	Hall (yellow card) 35'; Bramall 43'; Odoffin (yellow card) 50'; Washington 79'; Norton-Cuffy (yellow card) 82'	Stadium: The Coventry Building Society Arena; Attendance: 18,953; Referee: Andy Davies

29 October 2022 17	Cardiff City	1–0	Rotherham United	Leckwith
15:00 BST	Philogene 65'	Report	Peltier (yellow card) 73'	Stadium: Cardiff City Stadium; Attendance: 17,395; Referee: Oliver Langford

2 November 2022 18	Burnley	3–2	Rotherham United	Burnley
19:45 GMT	Rodriguez 35'; Maatsen (yellow card) 89'; Brownhill (yellow card) 89'; Benson 90+1'; Beyer (yellow card) 90+10'; Dervişoğlu 90+10'	Report	Wiles 3' (yellow card) 90'; Ogbene 64'; Bramall (yellow card) 68' (yellow-red card) 75'; Barlaser (yellow card) 90'	Stadium: Turf Moor; Attendance: 17,572; Referee: Leigh Doughty

5 November 2022 19	Rotherham United	1–2	Norwich City	Rotherham
15:00 GMT	Rathbone 49'; Ogbene (yellow card) 89'	Report	McLean 17'; Ramsey 50'; McCallum (yellow card) 84'; Gibson (yellow card) 90+2'; Hugill (yellow card) 90+6'	Stadium: New York Stadium; Attendance: 10,913; Referee: Dean Whitestone

8 November 2022 20	Sheffield United	0–1	Rotherham United	Sheffield
19:45 GMT	Sharp (yellow card) 71'; Norwood (yellow card) 90+5'	Report	Wiles 38'; Peltier (yellow card) 44'; Johansson (yellow card) 45'; Harding (yellow card) 45+2'	Stadium: Bramall Lane; Attendance: 30,700; Referee: Keith Stroud

12 November 2022 21	Luton Town	1–1	Rotherham United	Luton
15:00 GMT	Doughty (yellow card) 66'; Berry 90'	Report	Lindsay 1'; Harding (yellow card) 18'; Barlaser (yellow card) 23'; Peltier (yellow card) 47'; Bramall (yellow card) 88'; Eaves (yellow card) 89'; Washington (yellow card) 90+3'; Norton-Cuffy (yellow card) 90+8'	Stadium: Kenilworth Road; Attendance: 10,071; Referee: Steve Martin

10 December 2022 22	Rotherham United	1–3	Bristol City	Rotherham
12:30 GMT	Ogbene 25'; Wood (yellow card) 39'	Report	Harding 14' (o.g.); Williams 30'; King (yellow card) 43'; Wells (yellow card) 50'; Pring (yellow card) 60', (goal) 73'; Semenyo (yellow card) 90+1'	Stadium: AESSEAL New York Stadium; Attendance: 10,167; Referee: Sam Barrott

17 December 2022 23	West Bromwich Albion	3–0	Rotherham United	West Bromwich
15:00 GMT	Wallace 20'; Diangana 57'; Thomas-Asante (penalty missed) 70', 70'; O'Shea (yellow card) 78'	Report	Humphreys (yellow card) 69'; Kelly (yellow card) 72'	Stadium: The Hawthorns; Attendance: 22,519; Referee: John Busby

26 December 2022 24	Rotherham United	2–2	Stoke City	Rotherham
15:00 GMT	Eaves (yellow card) 3'; Thompson 45' (o.g.); Washington 71'	Report	Souttar (yellow card) 45+1'; Campbell 61'; Peltier 80' (o.g.); Brown (yellow card) 90+5'	Stadium: AESSEAL New York Stadium; Attendance: 11,517; Referee: David Webb

29 December 2022 25	Huddersfield Town	2–0	Rotherham United	Huddersfield
19:45 GMT	Rudoni (yellow card) 11'; Holmes 31'; Hogg (yellow card) 43'; Rhodes 56'; Boyle (yellow card) 73'	Report	Bramall (yellow card) 33'; Harding (yellow card) 42'	Stadium: John Smith's Stadium; Attendance: 19,378; Referee: Jeremy Simpson

1 January 2023 26	Millwall	3–0	Rotherham United	Bermondsey
15:00 GMT	Bradshaw 4', 81'; Cooper (yellow card) 51'; Humphreys 66' (o.g.)	Report	Lindsay (yellow card) 76'	Stadium: The Den; Attendance: 12,899; Referee: Gavin Ward

14 January 2023 27	Rotherham United	4–0	Blackburn Rovers	Rotherham
12:30 GMT	Oddofin 1'; Rathbone 52', (yellow card) 73'; Ferguson 76'; Washington 90+3'	Report		Stadium: AESSEAL New York Stadium; Attendance: 10,345; Referee: Dean Whitestone

21 January 2023 28	Watford	1–1	Rotherham United	Watford
15:00 GMT	Mario Gaspar (yellow card) 39'; Bachmann (yellow card) 45+7'; Ferreira 53'; Sierralta (yellow card) 90+2'	Report	Ferguson 20', (yellow card) 45+6'; Hjelde (yellow card) 30'; Peltier (yellow card) 90+5'	Stadium: Vicarage Road; Attendance: 18,911; Referee: David Webb

4 February 2023 29	Rotherham United	0–0	Sheffield United	Rotherham
12:30 GMT	Rathbone (yellow card) 78'	Report	Ahmedhodžić (yellow card) 56'	Stadium: AESSEAL New York Stadium; Attendance: 11,485; Referee: Graham Scott

11 February 2023 30	Blackpool	0–0	Rotherham United	Blackpool
15:00 GMT	Dougall (yellow card) 81'	Report		Stadium: Bloomfield Road; Attendance: 12,262; Referee: Josh Smith

14 February 2023 31	Reading	2–1	Rotherham United	Reading
19:45 GMT	Carroll 52', (yellow card) 90+6'; Yiadom (yellow card) 60'; Fornah 90'	Report	Peltier 37'	Stadium: Select Car Leasing Stadium; Attendance: 9,492; Referee: John Busby

18 February 2023 32	Rotherham United	0–2	Coventry City	Rotherham
15:00 GMT	Humphreys (yellow card) 33'; Ogbene (yellow card) 83'	Report	Norton-Cuffy (yellow card) 17'; Doyle (yellow card) 43'; Allen 46'; Gyökeres (yellow card) 83', (goal) 90+2'	Stadium: AESSEAL New York Stadium; Attendance: 10,865 (2,179 away); Referee: Keith Stroud

21 February 2023 33	Rotherham United	2–1	Sunderland	Rotherham
19:45 GMT	Rathbone 19'; Hugill (yellow card) 37'; Ferguson 56'; Coventry (yellow card) 82'	Report	Cirkin (yellow card) 40'; Gelhardt 61'	Stadium: AESSEAL New York Stadium; Attendance: 10,522 (2,190 away); Referee: Chris Kavanagh

27 February 2023 34	Swansea City	1–1	Rotherham United	Landore
20:00 GMT	Latibeaudiere (yellow card) 34'; Piroe 42'; Wood (yellow card) 71'; Cabango (yellow card) 81'	Report	Hugill (yellow card) 10'; Ogbene 52'; Hjelde (yellow card) 58'	Stadium: Swansea.com Stadium; Attendance: 15,144; Referee: Gavin Ward

5 March 2023 35	Rotherham United	3–1	Queens Park Rangers	Rotherham
15:00 GMT	Hugill 15', (yellow card) 34', (goal) 70' (pen.); Harding (yellow card) 82'; Odoffin 90'	Report	Adomah (yellow card) 42'; Field (yellow card) 49'; Dickie (yellow card) 69'; Lowe 83' (pen.)	Stadium: AESSEAL New York Stadium; Attendance: 10,563 (1,162); Referee: Darren Bond

11 March 2023 36	Birmingham City	2–0	Rotherham United	Birmingham
15:00 GMT	Khadra 5'; Long 35'; Trusty (yellow card) 80'	Report	Odoffin (yellow card) 29'; Hjelde (yellow card) 45+2'; Fosu (yellow card) 87'	Stadium: St. Andrew's Stadium; Attendance: 15,932; Referee: Geoff Eltringham

14 March 2023 37	Rotherham United	1–2	Preston North End	Rotherham
19:45 GMT	Odoffin (yellow card) 17', (goal) 35'; Ogbene (yellow card) 42'	Report	Cannon 23'; Evans 45+2'; Potts (yellow card) 90'; Fernández (yellow card) 90+4'	Stadium: AESSEAL New York Stadium; Attendance: 9,003 (723 away); Referee: Steve Martin

18 March 2023	Rotherham United	Abandoned	Cardiff City	Rotherham
15:00 GMT			Philogene 5'	Stadium: AESSEAL New York Stadium; Referee: Oliver Langford
Note: Fixture was abandoned with 48 minutes played due to unplayable pitch following a rain deluge.

1 April 2023 38	Hull City	0–0	Rotherham United	Kingston upon Hull
15:00 BST		Report	Humphreys (yellow card) 35'; Peltier (yellow card) 60'; Quina (red card) 79'	Stadium: MKM Stadium; Attendance: 23,432 (2,018 away); Referee: David Webb

7 April 2023 39	Rotherham United	3–1	West Bromwich Albion	Rotherham
13:00 BST	Hugill 42', 50'; Coventry (yellow card) 48'; Fosu 76'; Rathbone (yellow card) 82'	Report	Swift 32' (pen.); Townsend (yellow card) 68'; Bartley (yellow card) 70'; Grant (yellow card) 74'; Chalobah (yellow card) 78'	Stadium: New York Stadium; Attendance: 11,098; Referee: Tim Robinson

10 April 2023 40	Norwich City	0–0	Rotherham United	Norwich
15:00 BST		Report	Coventry (yellow card) 42'	Stadium: Carrow Road; Attendance: 26,269; Referee: Jeremy Simpson

15 April 2023 41	Rotherham United	0–2	Luton Town	Rotherham
15:00 BST	Hjelde (yellow card) 36'; Quina (yellow card) 90+4'	Report	Burke (yellow card) 37'; Morris 45'; Woodrow (penalty missed) 47', 47'; Campbell (yellow card) 61'; Drameh (yellow card) 78'; Nakamba (yellow card) 90'; Mpanzu (yellow card) 90+6'	Stadium: AESSEAL New York Stadium; Attendance: 11,009 (2,125 away); Referee: Leigh Doughty

18 April 2023 42	Rotherham United	2–2	Burnley	Rotherham
19:45 BST	Vitinho 45+2' (o.g.); Quina (yellow card) 68'; Kelly 85'	Report	Twine 26'; Maatsen (yellow card) 45+4'; Benson 81', (yellow card) 82'	Stadium: AESSEAL New York Stadium; Attendance: 10,566 (2,202 away); Referee: Bobby Madley

22 April 2023 43	Bristol City	2–1	Rotherham United	Ashton Gate
15:00 BST	Conway 15'; Scott (yellow card) 66'; Weimann (yellow card) 88', (goal) 90+1'; Nigel Pearson (yellow card) off the pitch'	Report	Humphreys (yellow card) 39'; Hugill (yellow card) 52', (goal) 67' (pen.); Bramall (yellow card) 56'	Stadium: Ashton Gate Stadium; Attendance: 19,350 (739 away); Referee: Josh Smith

27 April 2023 44	Rotherham United	1–2	Cardiff City	Rotherham
20:00 BST	Ogbene 37'; Rathbone (yellow card) 59'	Report	Etete 11'; Kaba (penalty missed) 45+2'; Kipré 87'	Stadium: AESSEAL New York Stadium; Attendance: 10,219 (864 away); Referee: Oliver Langford

29 April 2023 45	Rotherham United	1–0	Middlesbrough	Rotherham
15:00 BST	Lindsay (yellow card) 29'; Odoffin 48', (yellow card) 68'; Bramall (yellow card) 79'	Report	Hackney (yellow card) 17'; Dijksteel (red card) 45+5'	Stadium: AESSEAL New York Stadium; Attendance: 11,508 (2,212 away); Referee: Keith Stroud

8 May 2023 46	Wigan Athletic	0–0	Rotherham United	Wigan
15:00 BST		Report	Hjelde (yellow card) 59'; Harding (yellow card) 60'	Stadium: DW Stadium; Attendance: 17,788; Referee: Tim Robinson

=== FA Cup ===
The Millers were drawn away to Ipswich Town in the third round.

Win Draw Loss Fixtures

7 January 2023 Third round	Ipswich Town	4–1	Rotherham United	Ipswich
15:00 GMT	Humphreys 43'; Keogh (yellow card) 47'; Chaplin 74' (pen.); Ladapo 79'; Burns 87' (pen.)	Report	Washington 47' (pen.); Rathbone (yellow card) 54'; Wood (yellow card) 89'	Stadium: Portman Road; Attendance: 15,728; Referee: Seb Stockbridge

=== EFL Cup ===
Win Draw Loss Fixtures

Rotherham were drawn away to Port Vale in the first round and at home to Morecambe in the second round.

10 August 2022 First round	Port Vale	1–2	Rotherham United	Burslem
19:45 BST	Smith (yellow card) 44'; Benning 81'	Report	Rathbone 8', (yellow card) 90+2'; Ogbene 45+4'; Bramall (yellow card) 78'	Stadium: Vale Park; Attendance: 3,094; Referee: Bobby Madden

23 August 2022 Second round	Rotherham United	0–1	Morecambe	Rotherham
19:45 BST		Report	Gnahoua 72'	Stadium: New York Stadium; Attendance: 3,808; Referee: Peter Wright

== Transfers ==
=== In ===
Date	Pos	Player	Transferred from	Fee	Ref
23 June 2022	RB	(Republic of Ireland) Peter Kioso	(England) Luton Town	Undisclosed	
1 July 2022	LB	(England) Cohen Bramall	(England) Lincoln City	Undisclosed	
1 July 2022 (Note: The transfer was announced on 24 June, and became official on July 1, once his Hull City contract expired)	CF	(England) Tom Eaves	(England) Hull City	Free Transfer	
1 July 2022 (Note: The transfer was announced on 27 June, and became official on July 1, once his St Johnstone contract expired)	CB	(Scotland) Jamie McCart	(Scotland) St Johnstone	Free Transfer	
1 July 2022 (Note: The transfer was announced on 27 May, and became official on July 1, once his Charlton Athletic contract expired)	CF	(Northern Ireland) Conor Washington	(England) Charlton Athletic	Free Transfer	
5 July 2022	CB	(England) Cameron Humphreys	(Belgium) Zulte Waregem	Free Transfer	
28 July 2022	RB	(England) Lee Peltier	(England) Middlesbrough	Free Transfer	
2 September 2022	GK	(Scotland) Robbie Hemfrey	(England) Stoke City	Free Transfer	
10 January 2023	CB	(England) Sean Morrison	(Wales) Cardiff City	Free Transfer	
25 January 2023	CF	(England) Jordan Hugill	(England) Norwich City	Free Transfer	
8 March 2023	LB	(England) Tyler Blackett	Unattached	Free Transfer	

=== Out ===
Date	Pos	Player	Transferred to	Fee	Ref
30 June 2022 (Note: The transfer was announced on 17 June, and became official once his contract expired)	GK	(England) Alfie Burnett	(England) Forest Green Rovers	Free transfer	
30 June 2022	CB	(Republic of Ireland) Jake Cooper	(England) Altrincham	Released	
30 June 2022	RW	(England) Jacob Gratton	Unattached	Released	
30 June 2022 (Note: The transfer was announced on 22 June, and became official once his contract expired)	CB	(England) Michael Ihiekwe	(England) Sheffield Wednesday	Free transfer	
30 June 2022	CF	(England) Freddie Ladapo	(England) Ipswich Town	Released	
30 June 2022	CB	(England) Angus MacDonald	(England) Swindon Town	Released	
30 June 2022	LB	(England) Joe Mattock	(England) Harrogate Town	Released	
30 June 2022	LW	(England) Mickel Miller	(England) Plymouth Argyle	Released	
30 June 2022 (Note: The transfer was announced on 22 June, and became official once his contract expired)	CF	(England) Michael Smith	(England) Sheffield Wednesday	Free transfer	
27 July 2022	GK	(England) Josh Chapman	Unattached	Contract cancelled	
29 January 2023	CM	(England) Dan Barlaser	(England) Middlesbrough	Undisclosed fee	

=== Loans in ===
Date	Pos	Player	Loaned from	On loan until	Ref
23 July 2022	CB	(England) Grant Hall	(England) Middlesbrough	End of Season	
29 July 2022	CM	(Scotland) Scott High	(England) Huddersfield Town	11 January 2023 (Note: On 11 January, High returned to Huddersfield)	
22 August 2022	RB	(England) Brooke Norton-Cuffy	(England) Arsenal	6 January 2023 (Note: On 6 January, Norton-Cuffy was recalled by Arsenal)	
12 January 2023	LB	(Norway) Leo Hjelde	(England) Leeds United	End of Season	
20 January 2023	LW	(Ghana) Tariqe Fosu	(England) Brentford	End of Season	
26 January 2023	DM	(Republic of Ireland) Conor Coventry	(England) West Ham United	End of Season	
31 January 2023	CM	(Portugal) Domingos Quina	(England) Watford	End of Season	
31 January 2023	CB	(Australia) Bailey Wright	(England) Sunderland	End of Season	

=== Loans out ===
Date	Pos	Player	Loaned to	On loan until	Ref
10 August 2022	MF	(England) Curtis Durose	(England) Gainsborough Trinity	End of season (Note: On 6 January, Durose's loan at Gainsborough was extended by a further month. On 7 February 2023 it was again extended to the end of the season)	
10 August 2022	DF	(England) Mackenzie Warne	(England) Gainsborough Trinity	7 September 2022	
29 August 2022	CF	(Republic of Ireland) Joshua Kayode	(England) Milton Keynes Dons	End of season	
27 September 2022	CB	(England) Jake Hull	(England) Boston United	27 October 2022	
6 October 2022	CM	(Northern Ireland) Ciaran McGuckin	(England) Scarborough Athletic	End of season (Note: On 6 January, McGuckin's loan at Scarborough was extended until the end of the season)	
16 January 2023	LB	(England) Tolaji Bola	(England) Bradford City	End of season	
17 January 2023	CB	(Scotland) Jamie McCart	(England) Leyton Orient	End of season	
19 January 2023	CM	(England) Mackenzie Warne	(England) Bridlington Town	End of season	
3 February 2023	CB	(England) Jake Hull	(England) Buxton	End of season	
