= Jake Hull =

English footballer

Personal information
- Full name: Jake Matthew Hull
- Date of birth: 20 October 2001 (age 25)
- Place of birth: Sheffield, England
- Height: 1.99 m (6 ft 6 in)
- Position: Central defender

Team information
- Current team: Scarborough Athletic

Senior career*
Years	Team	Apps	(Gls)
2020–2025	Rotherham United	0	(0)
2020	→ Matlock Town (loan)	1	(0)
2021–2022	→ Guiseley (loan)	18	(1)
2022	→ Hartlepool United (loan)	7	(0)
2022	→ Boston United (loan)	4	(0)
2023	→ Buxton (loan)	12	(0)
2023–2024	→ Buxton (loan)	22	(1)
2025–	Scarborough Athletic	34	(2)
- * Club domestic league appearances and goals as of 22:04, 22 May 2026 (UTC)

Jake Matthew Hull (born 22 October 2001) is an English professional footballer who plays as a defender for National League North club Scarborough Athletic.

== Career ==
Born in Sheffield, Hull began his career at Rotherham United, signing his first professional contract in August 2020. He joined Matlock Town on a two-month youth loan on 25 September 2020, but returned in October after just one month, despite impressing. On 20 April 2021, he signed a new contract, keeping him with Rotherham until June 2022.

He scored on his senior debut for Rotherham in the EFL Trophy on 7 September 2021 in a 6–0 win against Doncaster Rovers. He moved to Guiseley on loan in August 2021, returning to Rotherham in January 2022. He moved on loan to Hartlepool United later that month.

In September 2022, Hull joined Boston United on a one-month loan deal.

In February 2023, Hull was loaned to Buxton on a deal that covered the remainder of the 2022–23 season. He returned on loan to Buxton for the 2023–24 season.

Upon returning to Rotherham for the 2024–25 season, he was omitted from the club's squad list. He was released upon the expiry of his contract in June 2025.

In July 2025, Hull joined National League North side Scarborough Athletic.

== Career statistics ==
As of match played 28 April 2026

Appearances and goals by club, season and competition
Club	Season	League			FA Cup		League Cup		Other		Total	
Club	Season	Division	Apps	Goals	Apps	Goals	Apps	Goals	Apps	Goals	Apps	Goals
Rotherham United	2020–21	Championship	0	0	0	0	0	0	0	0	0	0
Rotherham United	2021–22	League One	0	0	0	0	0	0	3 (Note: Appearance(s) in the EFL Trophy.)	2	3	2
Rotherham United	2022–23	Championship	0	0	0	0	0	0	0	0	0	0
Rotherham United	2023–24	Championship	0	0	0	0	0	0	0	0	0	0
Rotherham United	2024–25	League One	0	0	0	0	0	0	2	0	2	0
Rotherham United	Total		0	0	0	0	0	0	5	2	5	2
Matlock Town (loan)	2020–21	NPL Premier Division	1	0	1	0	0	0	0	0	2	0
Guiseley (loan)	2021–22	National League North	18	1	2	1	0	0	1 (Note: Appearance(s) in the FA Trophy.)	0	21	2
Hartlepool United (loan)	2021–22	League Two	7	0	0	0	0	0	0	0	7	0
Boston United (loan)	2022–23	National League North	4	0	0	0	—		0	0	4	0
Buxton (loan)	2022–23	National League North	12	0	—		—		—		12	0
Buxton (loan)	2023–24	National League North	22	1	1	0	—		1	0	24	1
Scarborough Athletic	2025–26	National League North	34	2	0	0	—		2	0	36	2
Career total			98	4	4	1	0	0	9	2	111	7
