= Conor Coventry =

Irish-English footballer (born 2000)

- Coventry with Charlton Athletic in 2026

Personal information
- Full name: Conor James Coventry
- Date of birth: 25 March 2000 (age 26)
- Place of birth: Waltham Forest, England
- Height: 1.77 m (5 ft 10 in)
- Position: Defensive midfielder

Team information
- Current team: Charlton Athletic
- Number: 6

Youth career
- 2010–2018: West Ham United

Senior career*
Years	Team	Apps	(Gls)
2018–2024	West Ham United	1	(0)
2020	→ Lincoln City (loan)	7	(0)
2021–2022	→ Peterborough United (loan)	12	(0)
2022	→ Milton Keynes Dons (loan)	20	(1)
2023	→ Rotherham United (loan)	16	(0)
2024–	Charlton Athletic	116	(1)

International career^{‡}
2016–2017	Republic of Ireland U17	10	(0)
2018–2019	Republic of Ireland U19	5	(0)
2019–2022	Republic of Ireland U21	28	(3)
2025–	Republic of Ireland	7	(0)
- * Club domestic league appearances and goals as of 17:10, 21 November 2026 (UTC) ‡ National team caps and goals as of 21:55, 4 October 2026 (UTC)

Conor James Coventry (born 25 March 2000) is a professional footballer who plays as a defensive midfielder for EFL Championship club Charlton Athletic and the Republic of Ireland national team.

Previously, he has played for West Ham United and also spent time on loan at Lincoln City, Peterborough United, Milton Keynes Dons and Rotherham United.

Born in England, he represents the Republic of Ireland at international level. Coventry is the Republic of Ireland's all-time record holder for the most appearances at U21 level with 28 caps.

== Club career ==
=== West Ham United ===
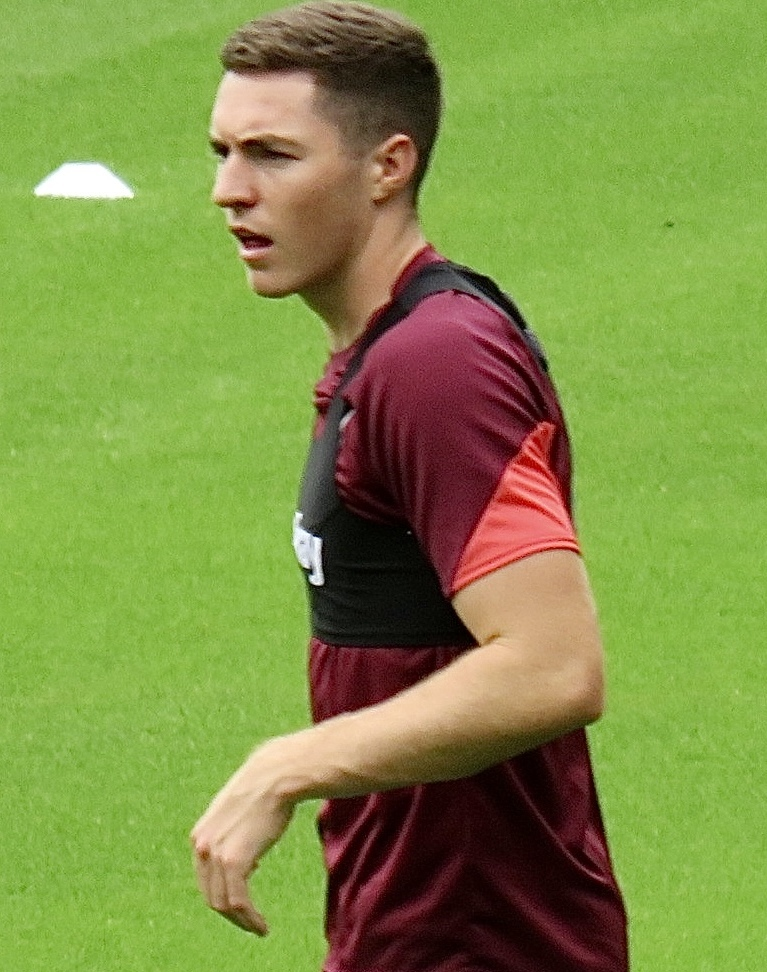
Coventry warming up for West Ham United in 2021

Coventry joined the youth academy of West Ham United at the age of 10. He scored his first goal for the under-23 team on his debut on 20 February 2017, in a 2–0 victory against Fulham. During the 2017–18 season, he played ten times in Professional Development League and four times in EFL Trophy and won the Academy Player of the Year award at the end of the season on 25 April 2018.

On 25 May 2018, Coventry signed his first professional contract with the club. About it, he said "I've worked for this for a long time so yes, I'm really happy to sign the deal". On 26 September, he made his first team debut, coming on as a substitute for Pedro Obiang in an 8–0 victory against Macclesfield Town in the EFL Cup. In January 2020, Coventry signed a new contract with West Ham which would see him stay at the club until 2023.

On 7 August 2022, Coventry made his Premier League debut as a 92nd-minute substitute for Pablo Fornals in a 2–0 home defeat to Manchester City.

In six seasons, Coventry made only 10 appearances for West Ham, including his single Premier League appearance in August 2022, before joining Charlton Athletic in January 2024.

==== Lincoln City (loan) ====
He signed on loan for League One club Lincoln City until the end of the 2019–20 season on 10 January 2020.

==== Peterborough United (loan) ====
Coventry signed a season-long loan deal with Championship team Peterborough United on 31 August 2021. He made 12 appearances for Peterborough before returning to West Ham in January 2022.

==== Milton Keynes Dons (loan) ====
On 18 January 2022, Coventry joined League One club Milton Keynes Dons on loan for the remainder of the 2021–22 season, playing his first game in the No. 14 shirt for the Dons on 22 January in a home loss versus Doncaster, where he was substituted in the 75th minute by Hiram Boateng.

Whilst on loan, Coventry scored his first professional league goal on 5 April 2022 in a 2–1 home win over Crewe Alexandra. He went on to make 22 appearances for MK Dons as the club secured a third-placed play-off finish.

==== Rotherham United (loan) ====
On 26 January 2023, Coventry joined Championship team Rotherham United on loan until the end of the 2022–23 season.

=== Charlton Athletic ===
On 12 January 2024, Coventry joined Charlton Athletic on a three-and-a-half-year deal for an undisclosed fee.

Coventry's first goal for Charlton came on 26 November 2024 in the 82nd minute of a 1–0 League One victory, away at Burton Albion.

== International career ==
Born in England, Coventry was eligible for both the England and Republic of Ireland national teams through his mother. Opting for the Republic of Ireland, he played regularly for the country's U17 and U19 sides before making his debut for Stephen Kenny's U21 team during the 2019 Toulon Tournament where the side finished in fourth place. Coventry was later named the team's captain and went on to feature regularly for the side.

He was called up to the Republic of Ireland senior squad for the first time in March 2021, replacing the injured Conor Hourihane in the squad for the World Cup Qualification matches against Serbia and Luxembourg and a friendly against Qatar, although did not make an appearance.

On 6 June 2022, Coventry made his 25th appearance for the U21 side, in a 3–1 win over Montenegro, setting a new national record for appearances at that level by a single player breaking the record of Graham Barrett.

On 16 November 2024, Coventry was called up again to the senior Republic of Ireland squad for its match with England.

On 13 November 2025, he made his senior Ireland debut when he came on as a substitute in a 2–0 win over Portugal in a World Cup qualifier.

== Career statistics ==
=== Club ===
As of match played 21 November 2026

Appearances and goals by club, season and competition
Club	Season	League			FA Cup		EFL Cup		Other		Total	
Club	Season	Division	Apps	Goals	Apps	Goals	Apps	Goals	Apps	Goals	Apps	Goals
West Ham United U23	2018–19	—							1 (Note: Appearance(s) in EFL Trophy)	0	1	0
West Ham United U23	2020–21	—							2	2	2	2
West Ham United U23	2023–24	—							1	0	1	0
West Ham United	2018–19	Premier League	0	0	0	0	1	0	—		1	0
West Ham United	2019–20	Premier League	0	0	0	0	1	0	—		1	0
West Ham United	2020–21	Premier League	0	0	0	0	1	0	—		1	0
West Ham United	2021–22	Premier League	0	0	—		—		—		0	0
West Ham United	2022–23	Premier League	1	0	0	0	1	0	5 (Note: Appearance(s) in UEFA Europa Conference League)	0	7	0
West Ham United	2023–24	Premier League	0	0	0	0	0	0	0	0	0	0
West Ham United	West Ham United total		1	0	0	0	4	0	5	0	10	0
Lincoln City (loan)	2019–20	League One	7	0	—		—		—		7	0
Peterborough United (loan)	2021–22	Championship	12	0	0	0	0	0	—		12	0
Milton Keynes Dons (loan)	2021–22	League One	20	1	—		—		2 (Note: Appearance(s) in League One play-offs)	0	22	1
Rotherham United (loan)	2022–23	Championship	16	0	—		—		—		16	0
Charlton Athletic	2023–24	League One	17	0	—		—		—		17	0
Charlton Athletic	2024–25	League One	44	1	3	0	1	0	4 (Note: One appearance in the EFL Trophy and three appearances in the League One play-offs)	0	52	1
Charlton Athletic	2025–26	Championship	40	0	1	0	0	0	—		41	0
Charlton Athletic	2026–27	Championship	15	0	0	0	1	0	—		16	0
Charlton Athletic	Charlton Athletic total		116	1	4	0	2	0	4	0	126	1
Career total			172	2	4	0	6	0	15	2	197	4

=== International ===
As of match played 4 October 2026

Appearances and goals by national team and year
National team	Year	Apps	Goals
Republic of Ireland
Republic of Ireland	2025	1	0
Republic of Ireland	2026	6	0
Total		7	0

== Honours ==
West Ham United

- UEFA Europa Conference League: 2022–23

Charlton Athletic

- EFL League One play-offs: 2025

Individual

- West Ham United Academy Player of the Year: 2017–18
- FAI Under-21 International Player of the Year: 2021
