= Wes Harding =

Footballer (born 1996)

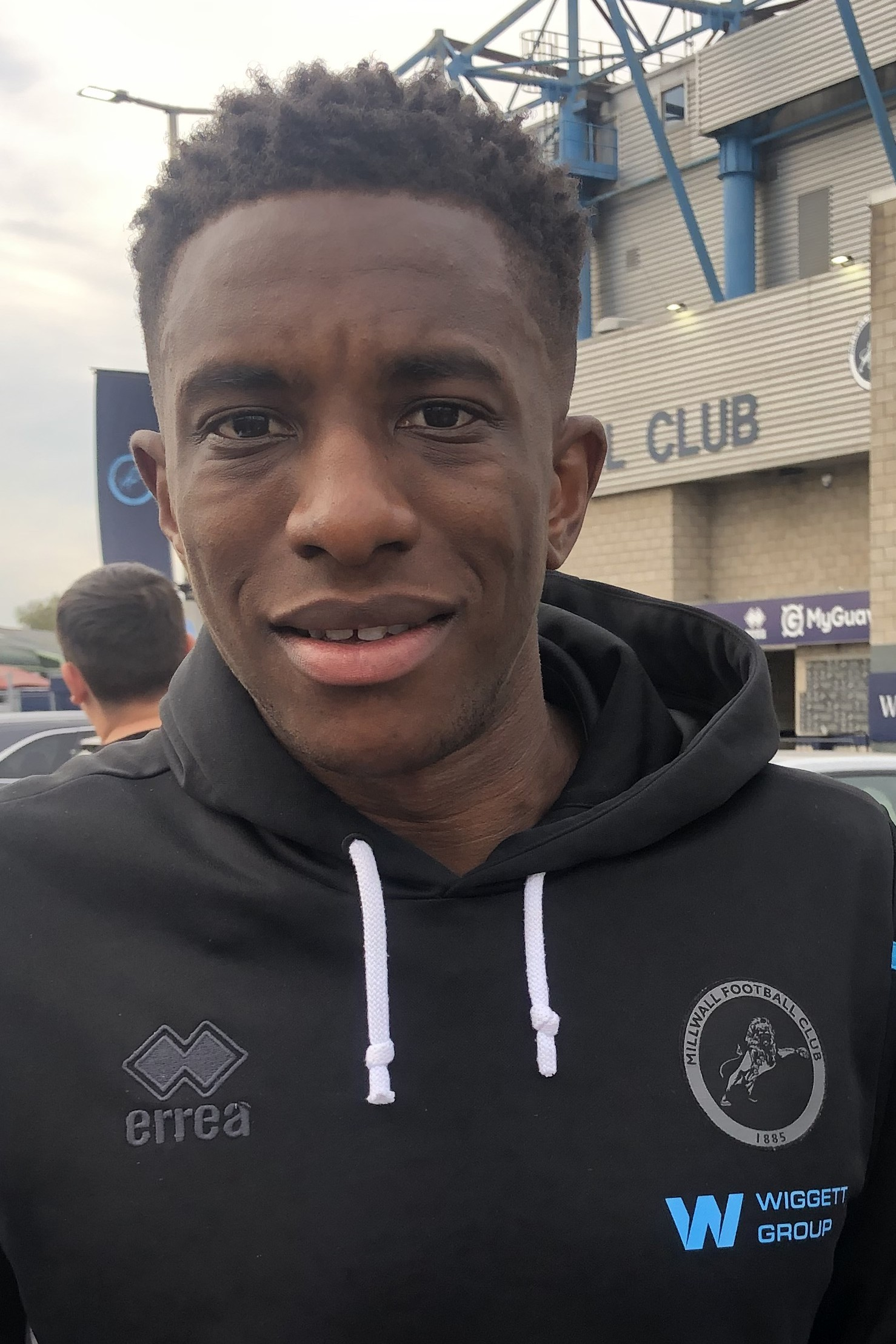
- Harding in 2025.

Personal information
- Full name: Wesley Nathan Hylton Harding
- Date of birth: 20 October 1996 (age 30)
- Place of birth: Leicester, England
- Height: 5 ft 11 in (1.81 m)
- Position: Defender

Team information
- Current team: Plymouth Argyle
- Number: 45

Youth career
- 200?–2013: Aston Villa
- 2013–2015: Birmingham City

Senior career*
Years	Team	Apps	(Gls)
2015–2020	Birmingham City (Note: Soccerbase counts the match at Brentford on 2 October 2018, in which Harding was an unused substitute, among his appearances.)	51	(0)
2016	→ Alfreton Town (loan)	3	(0)
2020–2023	Rotherham United	127	(1)
2023–2026	Millwall	37	(3)
2026	→ Plymouth Argyle (loan)	14	(0)
2026–	Plymouth Argyle	13	(0)

International career^{‡}
2021–	Jamaica	3	(0)
- * Club domestic league appearances and goals as of 17:02, 24 October 2026 (UTC) ‡ National team caps and goals as of 23:37, 30 June 2024 (UTC)

Wesley Nathan Hylton Harding (born 20 October 1996) is a professional footballer who plays as a defender, either at right back or centre back, for EFL League One club Plymouth Argyle and the Jamaica national team.

Harding made his senior debut in the EFL Cup in August 2017 for Birmingham City, having previously played in the National League North for Alfreton Town. He moved on to Rotherham United in 2020, and was a regular for three years before joining Millwall in 2023.

== Early life ==
Harding was born in Leicester and attended Beauchamp College, in Oadby, Leicestershire. He represented Leicestershire and Rutland at athletics.

Harding is a Christian.

== Club career ==
=== Early career ===
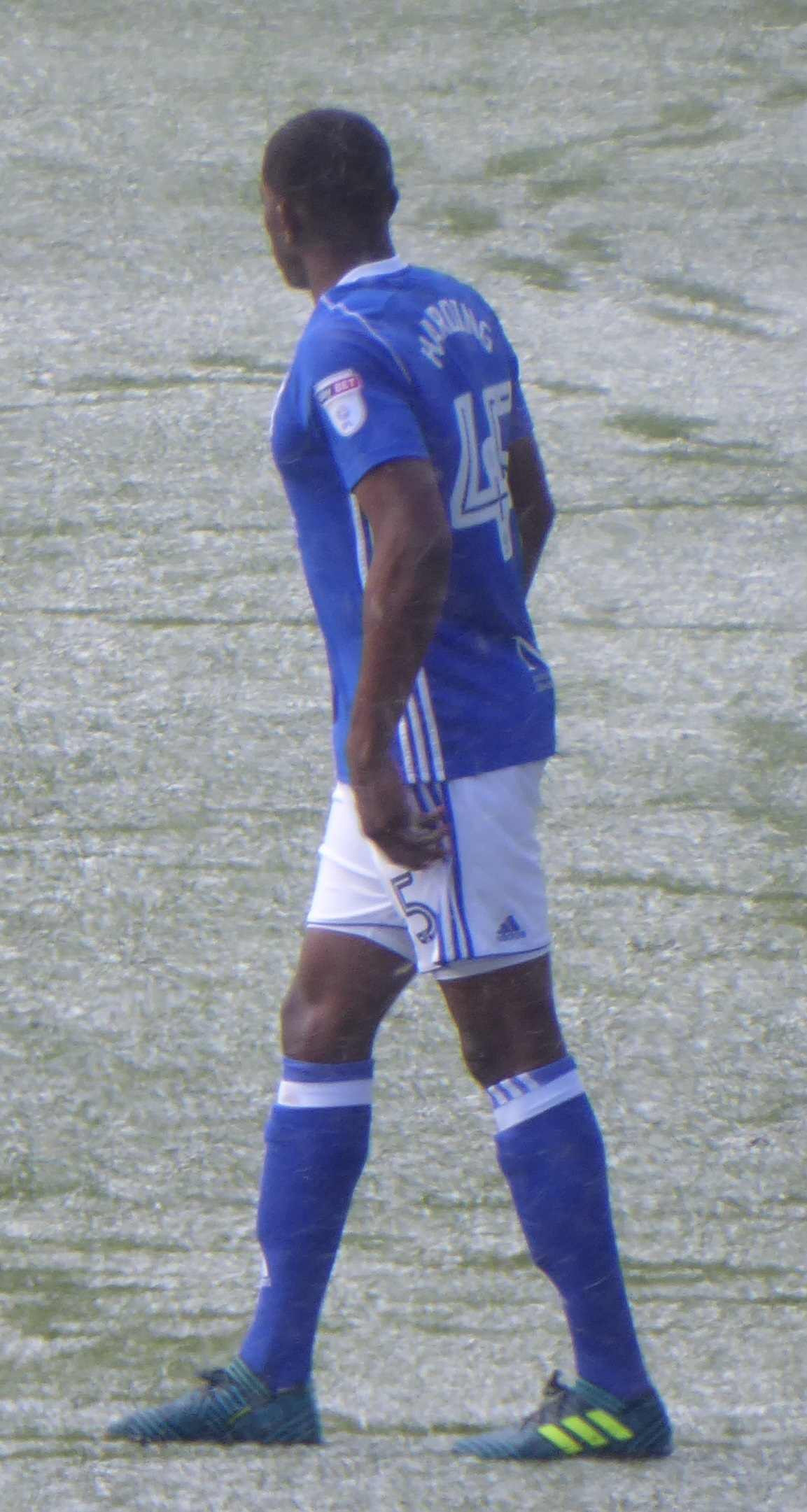
Harding during his league debut for Birmingham City in March 2018.

Harding joined Birmingham City's Academy from Aston Villa at the age of 16 and took up a scholarship with the club in July 2013. Interviewed soon afterwards, the player assessed his strengths as speed and heading, and felt he needed to improve his technical ability. He was a member of the Birmingham team that eliminated Liverpool's youngsters from the 2014–15 FA Youth Cup, going on to lose in the quarter-finals to Leicester City's youngsters. He was a regular in the development squad over the season, and scored the opening goal for the team that won the 2015 Birmingham Senior Cup final. Harding signed his first professional contract, of two years, in May 2015. At the time, academy coach Steve Spooner summarised him as "a 24/7 professional footballer ... strong, aggressive, tenacious and much improved with the ball".

Harding was included in the first team's pre-season training camp in Spain. During the 2015–16 season, he was used at right back as well as his preferred centre-half position, and he was a member of the Birmingham reserve team that lost the 2016 Birmingham Senior Cup final to National League North champions Solihull Moors. He was one of three youngsters – the others were Dom Bernard and Josh Dacres-Cogley – who began their 2016 pre-season training with the first team. On 9 August, Harding joined National League North club Alfreton Town on a month's youth loan. He went straight into the starting eleven for the following day's match against Gainsborough Trinity; playing at right back, he played 90 minutes and produced what Alfreton's website dubbed a solid performance in a 4–0 win. He kept his place for the next two fixtures, but then suffered a torn knee meniscus. Once he regained fitness, he finished the season with more appearances than any other player for Birmingham's under-23 team, which he often captained.

=== First-team football with Birmingham ===
The club took up the one-year option on Harding's contract for the 2017–18 season, and he was involved in first-team pre-season fixtures. He was given a squad number, and was an unused substitute for the opening match, away to Ipswich Town in the Championship on 5 August 2017. Harding made his senior debut three days later, replacing Emilio Nsue after 58 minutes of the EFL Cup first round match at home to Crawley Town of League Two. The score was 4–0 when he entered the match; it ended 5–1. He also appeared in the next round, replacing the injured Nsue after 23 minutes of the 2–1 defeat to AFC Bournemouth and producing a performance that pleased manager Harry Redknapp. In February 2018, having made no appearances in the matchday squad since August, Harding signed a new contract to run until June 2020.

New manager Garry Monk gave Harding his first Football League appearance, a start at right back in Birmingham's 3–0 home victory over Hull City on 17 March 2018 that was their first win in six weeks. He was booked early in the match for a forceful tackle on the highly rated Harry Wilson, then, according to the Birmingham Mail, "shut him down in the second half and made some excellent defensive contributions to help out team-mates. There were a couple of bright moments going forward too." Monk said he selected Harding ahead of more experienced players such as Carl Jenkinson or Marc Roberts because his pace and tenacity would better counteract the threat from Hull's wingers. He continued in the starting eleven as Birmingham escaped relegation on the final day of the season, with a 3–1 win at home to Fulham. Defensively, he allowed Ryan Sessegnon, the Championship Player of the Year, little scope to influence the game, and he made a run and cross from which Lukas Jutkiewicz scored the opening goal. Harding's performance in that match earned him a place in the EFL Team of the Week, and his overall performance earned him the club's Young Player of the Season award.

Harding signed a four-year contract in July 2018. He was a regular off the bench in the first few months of the season, but did not start until late November away to Aston Villa, playing behind regular left-back Kristian Pedersen who was selected on the wing. The experiment was not a success, but when Harding had to replace the injured Roberts – who was himself only in the side because Michael Morrison was injured – early in the visit to Blackburn Rovers three weeks later, "[having] never played a senior league match at centre half", he performed well. He started more regularly during the second half of the season, mainly at right back, and finished the campaign with 27 league appearances, of which 13 were in the starting eleven. In the 2019–20 season, Birmingham's full backs, Maxime Colin and Pedersen, missed only two league matches apiece, and loanee Jake Clarke-Salter became backup of choice in central defence. Harding was again a regular on the substitutes' bench, but came off it rather less frequently: he finished the season with 15 league appearances, of 7 were as a starter.

=== Rotherham United ===
Harding joined another Championship club, Rotherham United, on 20 August 2020 on a three-year deal; the fee was undisclosed.

Harding scored his first goal in senior football for Rotherham United in their 2021–22 EFL Trophy quarter-final encounter with Cambridge United on 25 January 2022.

=== Millwall ===
On 21 July 2023, Harding signed for Championship club Millwall.

On 2 February 2026, he joined League One club Plymouth Argyle on loan until the end of the season.

He was released by Millwall upon the expiry of his contract at the end of the 2025–26 season.

=== Plymouth Argyle ===
On 15 June 2026, Plymouth Argyle announced the permanent signing of Harding on a two-year deal. He was also named vice-captain.

== International career ==
In March 2021 he was one of six English-born players to receive their first call-up to the Jamaica national team. He made his international debut on 7 June 2021, in a 1–1 friendly draw with Serbia in Miki, Hyōgo, Japan.

== Career statistics ==
=== Club ===
As of match played 24 October 2026

Appearances and goals by club, season and competition
Club	Season	League			FA Cup		League Cup		Other		Total	
Club	Season	Division	Apps	Goals	Apps	Goals	Apps	Goals	Apps	Goals	Apps	Goals
Birmingham City	2016–17	Championship	0	0	0	0	0	0	—		0	0
Birmingham City	2017–18	Championship	9	0	0	0	2	0	—		11	0
Birmingham City	2018–19	Championship	27	0	1	0	1	0	—		29	0
Birmingham City	2019–20	Championship	15	0	3	0	1	0	—		19	0
Birmingham City	Total		51	0	4	0	4	0	—		59	0
Alfreton Town (loan)	2016–17	National League North	3	0	0	0	—		0	0	3	0
Rotherham United	2020–21	Championship	46	0	1	0	1	0	—		48	0
Rotherham United	2021–22	League One	38	0	3	0	0	0	5 (Note: Appearances in EFL Trophy)	1	46	1
Rotherham United	2022–23	Championship	43	1	1	0	2	0	—		46	1
Rotherham United	Total		127	1	5	0	3	0	5	1	140	2
Millwall	2023–24	Championship	24	3	1	0	1	0	—		26	3
Millwall	2024–25	Championship	5	0	2	1	1	0	—		8	1
Millwall	2025–26	Championship	8	0	0	0	3	0	—		11	0
Millwall	Total		37	3	3	1	5	0	—		45	4
Plymouth Argyle (loan)	2025–26	League One	14	0	—		—		1 (Note: Appearances in EFL Trophy)	0	15	0
Plymouth Argyle	2026–27	League One	13	0	0	0	2	0	2	0	17	0
Career total			245	4	12	1	14	0	8	1	279	6

=== International ===
As of 30 June 2024

Appearances and goals by national team and year
National Team	Year	Apps	Goals
Jamaica	2021	2	0
Jamaica	2024	1	0
Total		3	0

== Honours ==
Rotherham United

- League One runner-up: 2021–22
- EFL Trophy: 2021–22

Individual

- Birmingham City Young Player of the Season: 2017–18
