= Marc Roberts (footballer) =

English footballer

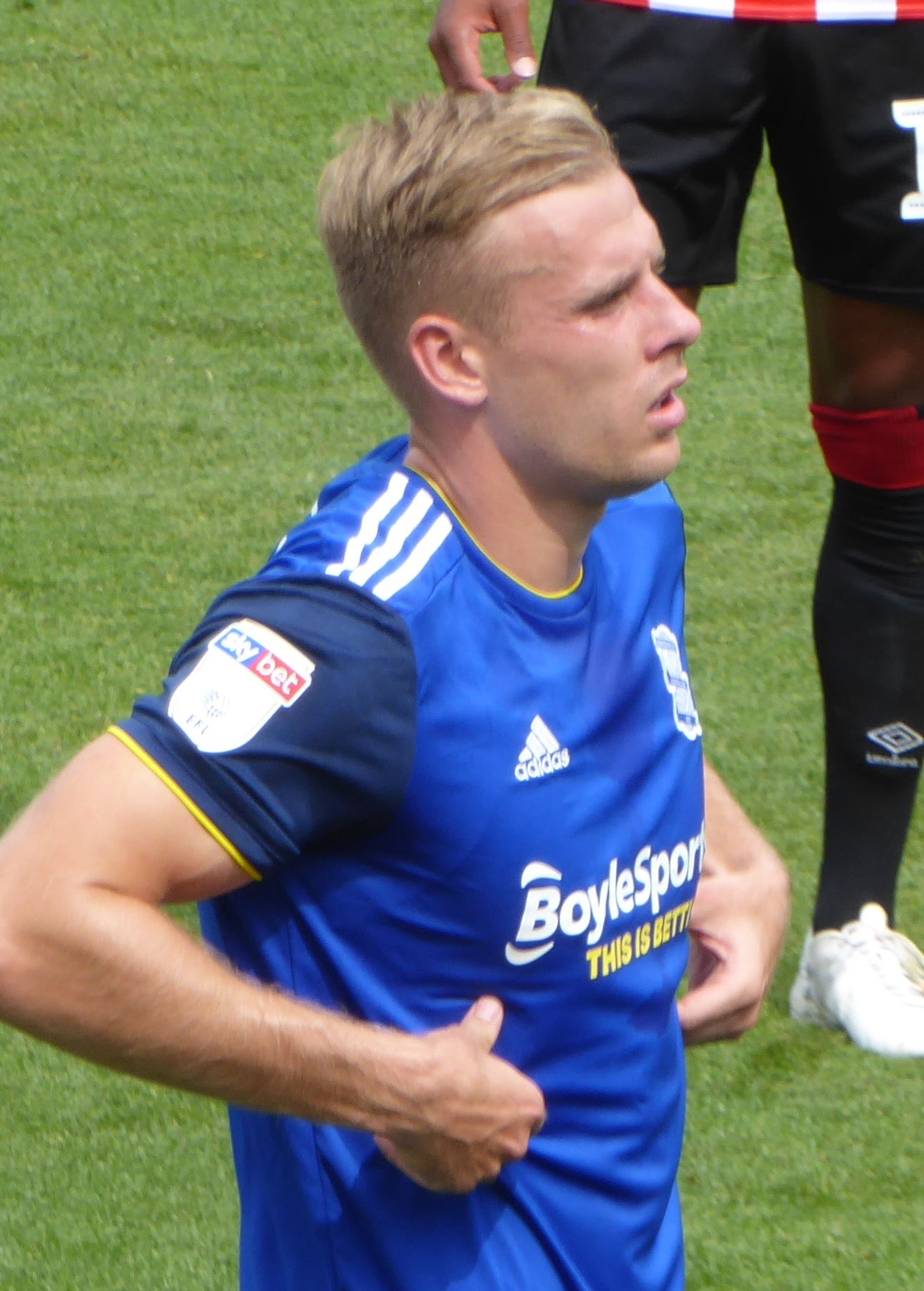
- Roberts with Birmingham City in 2019

Personal information
- Full name: Marc Roberts
- Date of birth: 26 July 1990 (age 36)
- Place of birth: Barnsley, England
- Height: 6 ft 4 in (1.93 m)
- Position: Defender

Senior career*
Years	Team	Apps	(Gls)
2008–2011	Wakefield		
2011–2013	Worksop Town		
2012–2013	→ Buxton (loan)		
2013	Buxton	0	(0)
2013–2015	FC Halifax Town	89	(9)
2015–2017	Barnsley	72	(5)
2017–2024	Birmingham City	186	(7)
2024–2026	Barnsley	46	(3)

International career
2014–2015	England C	4	(0)
- * Club domestic league appearances and goals as of 28 January 2026 (UTC)

Marc Roberts (born 26 July 1990) is an English professional footballer who plays as a defender.

Roberts began his career in non-league football, with Wakefield, Worksop Town, Buxton and FC Halifax Town, and was capped for England C, the team that represents England at semi-professional level. He joined League One club Barnsley in 2015, helped them gain promotion to the Championship, and captained the team. He signed for Birmingham in July 2017, spending seven years with them before joining Barnsley for two years.

== Life and career ==
Roberts was born in Barnsley, South Yorkshire, and raised in Penistone, where he attended Penistone Grammar School. He played football for Barnsley Boys and for Barnsley College, and as a 17-year-old was offered a trial with Barnsley F.C. but a broken ankle prevented his taking part.

Roberts began his senior football career with Wakefield of the Northern Premier League Division One North in 2008. After 17 first-team appearances, he had a trial with then Championship club Crystal Palace, on the recommendation of Wakefield manager Ronnie Glavin. No deal ensued, and Roberts returned to Wakefield to complete a season in which he won the Directors' Player of the Season award. In 2009–10, he won both Players' and Supporters' Player of the Season awards. In both campaigns, he won more man-of-the-match awards than any other Wakefield player. In 2011, he moved up a division, signing for Worksop Town.

A few weeks into the season, manager Martin McIntosh was sacked; he took over at another Premier Division club, Buxton, in February 2012, and promptly took Roberts on loan. Roberts played his part in Buxton avoiding relegation, and returned to Worksop where he appeared on the winning side in the Sheffield Senior Cup final. For 2012–13, Worksop's manager felt he had better defensive lineups without Roberts, who was keen to play regularly, so he was allowed to rejoin Buxton on loan for the season. He took his statistics to 5 goals from 65 appearances in all competitions, and was named Buxton's Player of the Year and Players' Player of the Year, as well as gaining selection for the Northern Premier League Premier Division Team of the Year. Roberts signed a permanent contract with Buxton in June 2013; although his Worksop contract had expired, a development fee was payable because of his age.

A month later, Roberts moved to FC Halifax Town, newly promoted to the Conference Premier.

Roberts spent two seasons with the Shaymen before signing for League One club Barnsley in May 2015. He made his Football League debut on 8 August 2015 in a 3–1 defeat against Chesterfield. Roberts became Barnsley captain on 28 January 2017, after Conor Hourihane's transfer to Aston Villa.

=== Birmingham City ===
Roberts signed a five-year contract with Championship club Birmingham City on 1 July 2017; the fee was undisclosed. He went straight into the starting eleven for the opening fixture of the 2017–18 season, which Birmingham lost 1–0 away to Ipswich Town, and was a regular in the side until February 2018. When Garry Monk took over as manager, he "had just one day to pick the back pairing" and chose Michael Morrison and Harlee Dean. Monk said later that Roberts had been unfortunate, but that the consistency of the Morrison–Dean partnership meant they kept their places. With Dean suspended for two of the last three matches of the season, Roberts came into the side to face Sheffield United and scored a first-half equaliser in a win that made a major contribution to their avoiding relegation. Morrison and Dean remained the pairing of choice, but when Morrison injured a hamstring in December 2018, Roberts was unable to take his chance. Nine minutes into his first league start of the season, he suffered a calf injury that left him unfit for selection until after the March 2019 international break. He came back into the side for the last two matches of the season with the team secure from relegation, partnering Wes Harding at centre-back after Dean had surgery on a groin problem and Morrison picked up an ankle injury.

He left the club when his contract expired at the end of the 2023–24 season.

=== Return to Barnsley ===
On 3 July 2024, Roberts returned his home-town club, Barnsley of League One, on a two-year deal. He was appointed vice-captain, with Luca Connell as club captain. In his second match of the season, away to Lincoln City, he assisted Sam Cosgrove's opening goal and scored Barnsley's second in a 2–1 win. He was released at the end of the 2025–26 season.

== Career statistics ==
As of match played 12 April 2025

Appearances and goals by club, season and competition
Club	Season	League			FA Cup		League Cup		Other		Total	
Club	Season	Division	Apps	Goals	Apps	Goals	Apps	Goals	Apps	Goals	Apps	Goals
FC Halifax Town	2013–14	Conference Premier	44	5	2	0	—		2 (Note: Appearances in Conference Premier play-offs)	0	48	5
FC Halifax Town	2014–15	Conference Premier	45	4	3	0	—		5 (Note: Appearances in FA Trophy)	1	53	5
FC Halifax Town	Total		89	9	5	0	—		7	1	101	10
Barnsley	2015–16	League One	32	1	1	0	2	0	6 (Note: Three appearances in League One play-offs, three in Football League Trophy)	0	41	1
Barnsley	2016–17	Championship	40	4	2	0	1	0	—		43	4
Barnsley	Total		72	5	3	0	3	0	6	0	84	5
Birmingham City	2017–18	Championship	30	1	3	0	2	0	—		35	1
Birmingham City	2018–19	Championship	8	0	0	0	1	0	—		9	0
Birmingham City	2019–20	Championship	34	0	1	0	0	0	—		35	0
Birmingham City	2020–21	Championship	36	4	1	0	0	0	—		37	4
Birmingham City	2021–22	Championship	39	2	0	0	0	0	—		39	2
Birmingham City	2022–23	Championship	25	0	0	0	1	0	—		26	0
Birmingham City	2023–24	Championship	14	0	1	0	1	0	—		16	0
Birmingham City	Total		186	7	6	0	5	0	—		197	7
Barnsley	2024–25	League One	33	3	2	1	2	0	0	0	37	4
Career total			379	24	16	1	10	0	13	1	418	26

== Honours ==
Barnsley

- Football League One play-offs: 2016
- Football League Trophy: 2015–16

Individual

- Barnsley Player of the Year: 2016–17
