= Boakye-Yiadom =

Boakye-Yiadom is a Ghanaian surname. Notable people with this name include:

- Anthony Boakye-Yiadom, Ghanaian politician
- Henry Yiadom Boakye (born 1969), Ghanaian politician
- Henry Yeboah Yiadom-Boachie (born 1972), Ghanaian politician
- Kofi Boakye Yiadom (died 2020), Ghanaian singer and songwriter
- Lynette Yiadom-Boakye (born 1977), British painter and writer
- Nana Boakye-Yiadom (disambiguation)
  - Nana Boakye-Yiadom (footballer) (born 1996), English footballer
  - Nana Boakye-Yiadom (journalist) (born 1983), Ghanaian journalist
- Richmond Yiadom Boakye (born 1993), Ghanaian footballer
- Patrick Boakye-Yiadom (born 1976), Ghanaian politician

== See also ==
- Boakye
- Yiadom
