= Amankwaah =

Amankwaah is a given name and a surname. Notable people with the name include:

== Middle name ==
- Afia Amankwaah Tamakloe, radio personality, health advocate, and journalist

== Surname ==
- Kevin Amankwaah (born 1982), English footballer
- Shantae-Eve Amankwaah (born 2009), English artistic gymnast

== See also ==
- Amankwah
