= Owusu Achaw Duah =

Ghanaian politician

Hon. Dr. Owusu Achaw Duah

Member of the Ghana Parliament for Offinso South
- In office 2005 – Dec 2008
- Preceded by: Kwabena Sarfo
- In office Jan 2009 – Jan 2013
- President: John Kufuor

Personal details
- Party: New Patriotic Party
- Children: 5
- Education: University of Ghana Medical School
- Occupation: Medical Practitioner

Dr. Owusu Achaw Duah is a Ghanaian medical doctor, retired lecturer, and politician. He is the CEO and president of Martin Luther King Health Training School. In 2006, he was elected as the member of parliament for the Offinso South constituency through a by-election following the death of Kwabena Sarfo in August 2006. Owusu was born May 4, 1948. As a child he grew up in Kumasi, Ghana. In his hometown, he saw people who did not have access to medical attention or have the money to become educated. These observations motivated and influenced his future careers and goal, therefore helping him to change the world for the better.

== Education ==
Owusu had his ordinary and advanced level certificates from Konongo Odumase Senior High and Opoku Ware Senior High schools respectively. In high school, he learned and enjoyed chemistry, leading him to study and get a career in chemical pathology. At the age of 20, Owusu attended medical school for 6 years. He graduated from the University of Ghana Medical School in 1973, earning his MD, and also holds a post-graduate diploma in Telemedicine. After medical school, Owusu was a medical officer and did practicals at Korle Bu Teaching Hospital for five years. In 1978, he went to Canada, and attended the University of Western Ontario, for residency training, for a year and a half. After going to the University of Western Ontario, he went to the University of Ottawa to continue residency and fellowship in chemical pathology.

== Politics ==
Owusu contested and won the Offinso South constituency by-election in 2006 on the ticket of the New patriotic Party. During this time, he started the Martin Luther King Memorial Clinic, located in Accra, Ghana. He started it so the people facing poverty were able to seek medical attention if needed.

== Career ==
He is a medical director at Dr Martin Luther King Clinic in Accra and an external examiner at the Kwame Nkrumah University of Science and Technology. He is a retired lecturer and former Head of Chemical Pathology Department of University of Ghana Medical School. In 1994, he went to the Bahamas and became a pathologist at Princess Margaret Hospital. At the time, Owusu had many options of where to choose to continue his pathology career in Canada. However, due to the shortage of doctors at Princess Margaret Hospital, Owusu became a pathologist there to help those in need. In 2006, Owusu started a college, named Martin Luther King Health Training School, located in Accra, Ghana. It was a school for the underprivileged who wanted to study to become doctors. He is currently the President and CEO of Martin Luther King Health Training School.

== Personal life ==
Owusu is married to Helen Duah and has 5 children.

Owusu was inspired by Dr. Martin Luther King due to his persistence. Owusu followed Dr. King's principles and had perseverance. Owusu named his schools, and clinics after Dr. King.

Owusu’s current goals are to build a school for skilled students and to make sure most people in his hometown have access to medical attention.
