= Boakye =

Boakye is a surname. Notable people with the surname include:

- Augustine Boakye (born 2000), Ghanaian footballer
- Emmanuel Boakye (born 1985), Ghanaian footballer
- Ellen Boakye, Ghanaian pediatric cardiologist
- Eric Boakye (born 1999), Ghanaian footballer
- Francis Asenso-Boakye (born 1977), Ghanaian politician
- Gabriel Boakye (born 1998), Canadian soccer player
- George Boakye (1937–1979), Ghanaian airman and politician
- Isaac Boakye (born 1981), Ghanaian footballer
- Isaac Boakye (footballer, born 1984), Ghanaian footballer
- Isaac Boakye (footballer, born 1997), Ghanaian footballer
- Kofi Nti Boakye (born 1987), Ghanaian footballer
- Kwasi Boakye (1827–1904), Dutch mining engineer and prince of the Ashanti Empire
- Kwesi Boakye (born 1999), American actor
- Lynette Yiadom Boakye (born 1977), English artist
- Martin Boakye (born 1995), Italian footballer
- Maurice Boakye (born 2004), German footballer
- Nana Boakye-Yiadom (journalist) (born 1983), Ghanaian journalist
- Nana Boakye-Yiadom (footballer) (born 1996), English footballer
- Panin Boakye (born 1995), Ghanaian footballer
- Portia Boakye (born 1989), Ghanaian footballer
- Richmond Boakye (born 1993), Ghanaian footballer
- Thomas Boakye (born 1993), Ghanaian footballer
