= Vincent Asare Bediako =

Ghanaian politician

Vincent Asare Bediako is a Ghanaian politician and a member of the National Democratic Congress (NDC). He represents Offinso South Constituency in the Ashanti Region in the 9th Parliament of the 4th Republic of Ghana.
