= Luke Berry =

English footballer (born 1992)

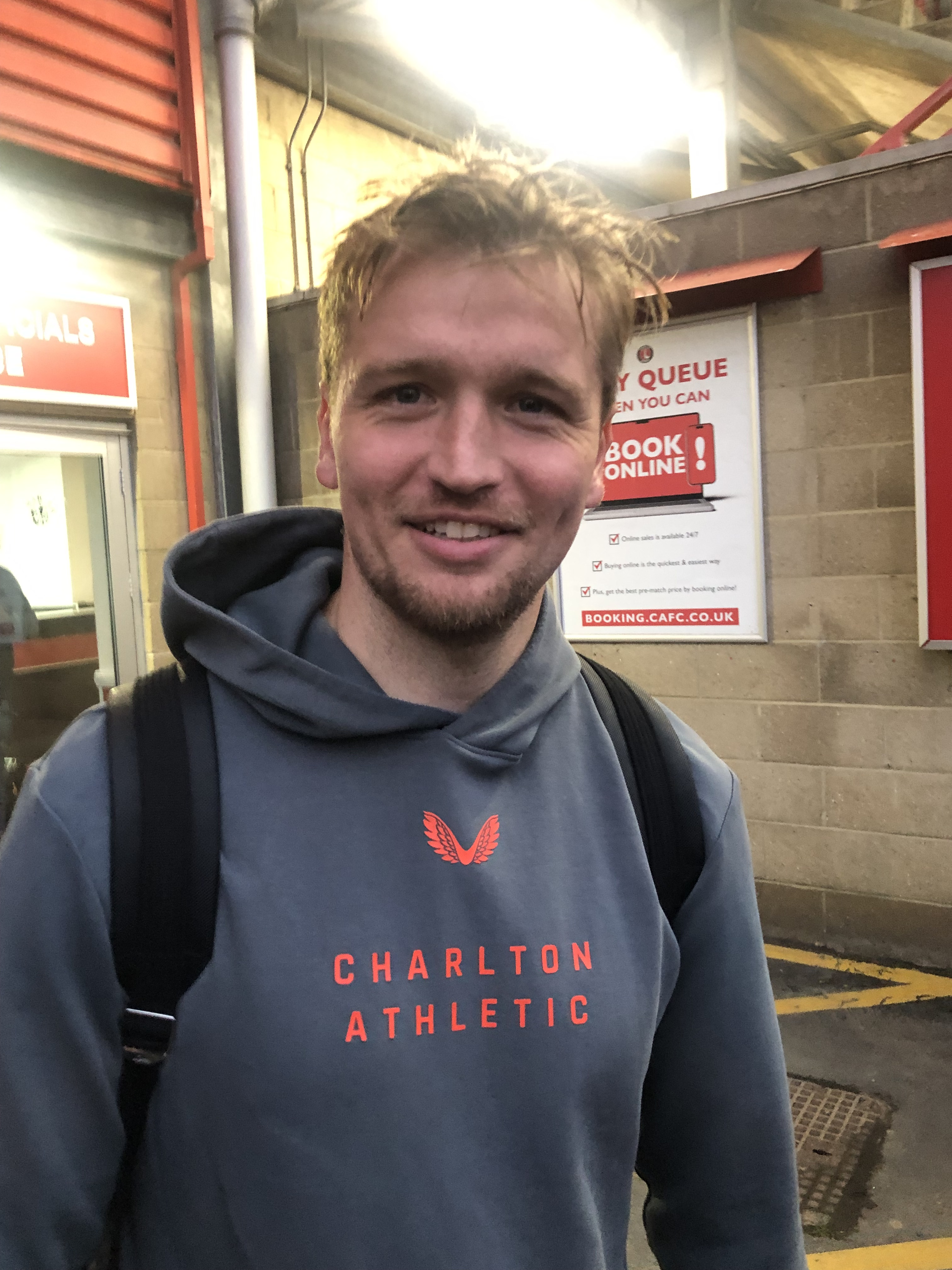
- Berry in 2024

Personal information
- Full name: Luke David Berry
- Date of birth: 12 July 1992 (age 34)
- Place of birth: Cambridge, England
- Height: 5 ft 10 in (1.77 m)
- Position: Midfielder

Youth career
- –2010: Cambridge United

Senior career*
Years	Team	Apps	(Gls)
2010–2014	Cambridge United	128	(22)
2014–2015	Barnsley	31	(1)
2015–2017	Cambridge United	94	(29)
2017–2024	Luton Town	158	(24)
2024–2026	Charlton Athletic	57	(8)
- * Club domestic league appearances and goals as of 17:10, 28 June 2026 (UTC)

Luke David Berry (born 12 July 1992) is an English professional footballer who plays as a midfielder. He is currently a free agent.

== Career ==
=== Cambridge United ===
Born in Cambridge, was in Cambridge United's youth setup before making the step up to the first team squad in July 2009.

=== Barnsley ===
On 29 July 2014, Berry signed for Barnsley, who were newly relegated into League One on a three-year contract for an undisclosed fee. He made his Football League debut in their 1–0 opening day defeat at home to Crawley Town, in which he was substituted for Nana Boakye-Yiadom in the 78th minute. Berry scored his first goal for Barnsley in a Football League Trophy tie against Oldham Athletic on 7 October 2014, which they lost 4–2 in a penalty shoot-out after the match finished as a 2–2 draw. He scored his first league goal with a stoppage time equaliser in a 1–1 draw at home to Peterborough United on 18 April 2015.

=== Cambridge United ===
On 15 June 2015, Berry re-signed for Cambridge United on a four-year contract for an undisclosed fee. He scored four goals in their 4–0 win at home to Coventry City in the FA Cup second round on 4 December 2016, ensuring their progression to the third round.

=== Luton Town ===
On 25 August 2017, Berry signed for League Two rivals Luton Town on a three-year contract for an undisclosed fee, with the option of a further year. He helped the club gain promotion to League One in his first season, followed by winning the Championship in his second season and finally the EFL Championship playoffs in 2023, whilst scoring for Luton in all three of the lower leagues.

Berry scored in a 1–1 home draw against Nottingham Forest on 16 March 2024, making him the first player to score for Luton in all of the top four divisions of English football. On 24 May 2024, it was announced Berry would be leaving the club after Luton chose not to exercise the one-year extension in his contract in order to allow him to gain first-team opportunities elsewhere.

=== Charlton Athletic ===
On 17 June 2024, it was confirmed that Berry would join League One side Charlton Athletic on a two-year deal with the option of another year when his contract at Luton Town expired on 1 July 2024.

On 8 May 2026, it was confirmed that Berry would leave the club following the expiration of his contract.

== Career statistics ==
As of match played 2 May 2026

Appearances and goals by club, season and competition
Club	Season	League			FA Cup		League Cup		Other		Total	
Club	Season	Division	Apps	Goals	Apps	Goals	Apps	Goals	Apps	Goals	Apps	Goals
Cambridge United	2009–10	Conference Premier	1	0	0	0	—		0	0	1	0
Cambridge United	2010–11	Conference Premier	14	1	0	0	—		0	0	14	1
Cambridge United	2011–12	Conference Premier	43	6	3	1	—		4 (Note: Appearances in FA Trophy)	2	50	9
Cambridge United	2012–13	Conference Premier	28	3	1	0	—		0	0	29	3
Cambridge United	2013–14	Conference Premier	42	12	4	2	—		10 (Note: Eight appearances and two goals in FA Trophy, two appearances in Conference Premier play-offs)	2	56	16
Cambridge United	Total		128	22	8	3	—		14	4	150	29
Barnsley	2014–15	League One	31	1	4	0	0	0	2 (Note: Appearance(s) in Football League Trophy)	1	37	2
Cambridge United	2015–16	League Two	46	12	2	1	1	0	1	0	50	13
Cambridge United	2016–17	League Two	45	17	4	4	2	1	1 (Note: Appearance(s) in EFL Trophy)	0	52	22
Cambridge United	2017–18	League Two	3	0	—		0	0	—		3	0
Cambridge United	Total		94	29	6	5	3	1	2	0	105	35
Luton Town	2017–18	League Two	34	7	3	1	—		2	0	39	8
Luton Town	2018–19	League One	21	3	2	0	1	0	0	0	24	3
Luton Town	2019–20	Championship	21	1	1	0	3	0	—		25	1
Luton Town	2020–21	Championship	31	2	2	0	1	0	—		34	2
Luton Town	2021–22	Championship	13	6	2	1	0	0	—		15	7
Luton Town	2022–23	Championship	21	3	3	0	1	0	2 (Note: Appearance in Championship play-offs)	0	27	3
Luton Town	2023–24	Premier League	17	2	1	0	2	0	—		20	2
Luton Town	Total		158	24	14	2	8	0	4	0	184	26
Charlton Athletic	2024–25	League One	41	7	3	1	1	0	3 (Note: Two appearances in the EFL Trophy and one appearance in the League One play-offs)	0	48	8
Charlton Athletic	2025–26	Championship	16	1	0	0	1	1	—		17	2
Charlton Athletic	Total		57	8	3	1	2	1	3	0	65	10
Career total			468	84	35	11	13	2	25	5	541	102

== Honours ==
Cambridge United

- Conference Premier play-offs: 2014
- FA Trophy: 2013–14

Luton Town

- EFL Championship play-offs: 2023
- EFL League One: 2018–19

Charlton Athletic

- EFL League One play-offs: 2025

Individual

- PFA Team of the Year: 2016–17 League Two, 2017–18 League Two
