= Konongo Odumase Senior High School =

Location
- P. O. Box 8 Odumase; Ashanti Region; Konongo-Odumase; Ghana
- Coordinates: 06°36′54″N 1°13′38″W

Information
- Type: Public high school
- Motto: BAANU YԐ
- Established: 23 February 1953 (73 years ago)
- Status: Active
- School district: Asante Akim Central Municipal District
- Oversight: Ghana Education Service; Ministry of Education
- Headmaster: Benjamin Kwaku Baah
- Gender: Mixed
- Age: 14 to 20
- Classes offered: Agricultural Science, Business, General Arts, General Science, Home Economics and Visual Arts
- Campus type: Urban area
- Houses: 8
- Colours: Yellow and green
- Slogan: Anuanom
- Nickname: KOSS
- Alumni: Onua

Konongo Odumase Senior High School is a coeducational second-cycle institution at Konongo-Odumase in the Asante Akim Central District of the Ashanti Region of Ghana.

== History ==
The school was started as Konongo Odumasi Secondary School but was renamed Konongo Odumase Senior High School around 2005 when the Kufuor government decided to redesignate all senior secondary schools in the country as senior high schools. This was as part of the "Accelerated Development Plan for Education" started after Kwame Nkrumah's Convention People's Party won the 1951 Gold Coast legislative election. Two important teachers at the inception of the school were D. A. Agyei and B. Spio-Garbrah. The school moved to its current permanent site in 1963. The original school site was nicknamed Biafra, after the secessionist state of Biafra associated with the Nigerian Civil War.

The school expanded to include a Sixth form, running Advanced level courses in the 1965 / 1966 academic year.

The school crest was designed by B. Spio Garbrah, the first headmaster and also an artist. The first head boy of the school was S. K Obeng.

Konongo Odumasi Senior High School moved from Category B to Category A after the 2023 WASSCE exam.

== Riots ==
In November 2016, there were riots among the students which led to the temporary closure of the school. This was because the students wanted the headmistress of the school to be removed.

== Notable alumni ==
- Kwadwo Owusu Afriyie – general secretary of the New Patriotic Party and chief executive officer of the Forestry Commission
- Samuel Ofori Amponsah – musician
- Papa Arko – 1983 African Cup of Champions Clubs winner
- Yaa Ntiamoah Badu – former pro vice chancellor of the University of Ghana
- Paul Baffoe-Bonnie – chief justice of Ghana and Supreme Court judge
- Daasebre Oti Boateng – Ghanaian statistician, academic and Omanhene (paramount chief) of New Juaben in the Eastern Region
- Charles de Graft Dickson – member of Parliament in the First Republic and Minister of Defence
- Owusu Achaw Duah – MP for Offinso South
- Dorcas Gyimah – Ghanaian sprinter
- Mohammed Rabiu – footballer
- Afia Amankwaah Tamakloe – TV and radio personality, journalist
- Kofi Wampah – former governor of the Bank of Ghana

== See also ==
- Education in Ghana
- List of senior high schools in the Ashanti Region
