= Francis Kwasi Buor =

Ghanaian politician

Hon. Francis Kwasi Buor

Member of Parliament for Offinso South constituency
- In office 1997–2001

Personal details
- Party: New Patriotic Party

Francis Kwasi Buor is a Ghanaian politician. He is the member of parliament that represented Offinso South constituency in the Ashanti Region of Ghana in the 2nd Parliament of the 4th Republic of Ghana on the ticket of the New Patriotic Party.

== Politics ==
Francis Kwasi Buor career began when he represented for the first time during the 1996 Ghanaian general election with 17,077 votes. He took the seat from Kenneth Amponsah-Yiadom of the National Democratic Congress (NDC).He was succeeded in office by Kwabena Sarfo of the New Patriotic Party.

== Personal life ==
He is a Christian.
