= 2016–17 Stoke City F.C. season =

Stoke City
2016–17 season
- Chairman: Peter Coates
- Manager: Mark Hughes
- Stadium: bet365 Stadium
- Premier League: 13th (44 points)
- FA Cup: Third Round
- EFL Cup: Third Round
- Top goalscorer: League: Peter Crouch (7); All: Peter Crouch (10)
- Highest home attendance: 27,835 v Tottenham Hotspur (10 September 2016)
- Lowest home attendance: 26,602 v Swansea City (31 October 2016)
- Average home league attendance: 27,433
Home colours	Away colours

The 2016–17 season was Stoke City's ninth season in the Premier League and the 61st in the top tier of English football.

Following last season's third-straight ninth-place finish, Mark Hughes brought in Joe Allen, Wilfried Bony, Lee Grant, Bruno Martins Indi and Ramadan Sobhi. However, Stoke's poor form at the end of last season continued at the start of 2016–17 as in the first six matches they managed to pick up just two points, conceding 15 goals, which meant they ended September in the relegation zone. Following a 1–1 draw at Manchester United at the start of October, Stoke's form picked up and with wins against Sunderland, Hull City, Swansea City, Watford and Burnley the team climbed back into a mid-table position come December.

The team's form dropped off again around Christmas conceding three at Arsenal and four at Liverpool and Chelsea whilst home matches against Southampton and Leicester City ended in draws. In January 2017 Hughes brought in long-term transfer target Saido Berahino whilst allowing Bojan to leave on loan. Performances in 2017 were disappointing as Stoke won just six of the remaining 19 Premier League matches, whilst also making an early FA Cup exit. Stoke earned 44 points and finished in 13th position.

== Pre-season ==
In April 2016, Stoke announced that from the 2016–17 season, the Britannia Stadium will be renamed the Bet365 Stadium, with the capacity to be increased to 30,000 for the start of the 2017–18 season. The club also announced a five-year contract with kit manufacturer Macron, described by chief executive Tony Scholes as the biggest kit deal in the club's history. Stoke announced their retained list in June 2016; departing the club were experienced duo Peter Odemwingie and Steve Sidwell along with development squad players Ben Barber, Ed Dryden, Bobby Moseley, Ryan O'Reilly, Petros Skapetis and Mason Watkins-Clarke.

The Stoke squad returned to training on 8 July 2016, where they then went on a six-day training camp in Kitzbühel, Austria. Stoke's first pre-season match saw them lose 3–0 to a much fitter Burton Albion side with goals from Lucas Akins and a brace from Chris O'Grady. Stoke then played out a 1–1 draw against Preston North End at Deepdale, with Mame Biram Diouf cancelling out Daniel Johnson's opener. Stoke made their first signings of the season on 25 July 2016 with the arrival of Egyptian winger Ramadan Sobhi from Al Ahly for £5 million and Welsh midfielder Joe Allen from Liverpool for £13 million. The squad then travelled out to Florida for a ten-day training camp. Stoke earned their first win of pre-season on 27 July 2016 with a 2–1 win against Major League Soccer (MLS) side Orlando City, with goals from Bojan and Diouf. Stoke also played against Orlando's B team in a behind closed doors match which Stoke won 5–0. Stoke ended their low-key pre-season with a 1–0 defeat at German Bundesliga club Hamburger SV.

Match	Date	Opponent	Venue	Result	Scorers	Report
1	16 July 2016	Burton Albion	A	0–3		Report
2	23 July 2016	Preston North End	A	1–1	Diouf 54'	Report
3	27 July 2016	Orlando City	A	2–1	Diouf 48', Bojan 64'	Report
4	1 August 2016	Orlando City B	A	5–0	Shaqiri 22', 29' (2), Joselu 51', Diouf 63', Arnautović 82'	Report
5	6 August 2016	Hamburger SV	A	0–1		Report

== Premier League ==
=== August ===
Stoke began their ninth season in the Premier League with a trip to newly promoted Middlesbrough on 13 August. Stoke suffered a blow prior to the match with Jack Butland being ruled out due to injury. Stoke made a poor start to the match, with new Boro signing Álvaro Negredo scoring after 11 minutes and Gastón Ramírez hitting the post, as Aitor Karanka's side controlled the first half. Stoke improved after the break, however, and earned a point thanks to a Xherdan Shaqiri free-kick.

Stoke's first home match at the newly re-branded Bet365 Stadium was against Pep Guardiola's Manchester City. The Citizens took the lead in controversial fashion after referee Mike Dean awarded a penalty against Ryan Shawcross for shirt pulling, Sergio Agüero scoring from the spot. Agüero then made it 2–0 with a header before Dean awarded Stoke a penalty for the same offence he gave Man City, Raheem Sterling pulling back Shawcross. Bojan converted his spot-kick, but it was Manchester City substitute Nolito who sealed the three points for the away side with two late goals.

The final match of August was away at Ronald Koeman's Everton, where Stoke lost 1–0 to a controversial penalty. After a goalless first half, Michael Oliver awarded Everton a penalty just after half time for Phil Bardsley tangling with Ashley Williams from a corner. Shay Given pushed Leighton Baines' spot-kick on to the post but the ball then rebounded off Given's head and in. After the match, Oliver's decision was criticised by Mark Hughes, Glenn Whelan and Peter Coates.

Stoke had a busy transfer deadline day with the loan arrivals of Wilfried Bony, Bruno Martins Indi and Lee Grant, while Joselu and Philipp Wollscheid both departed on season-long loans.

=== September ===
Hughes gave debuts to new signings Wilfried Bony and Bruno Martins Indi for the visit of Tottenham Hotspur following the international break. After an even opening half hour the game changed when Mark Hughes was sent-off by Antony Taylor for arguing with fourth official Jon Moss, Hughes later admitted he deserved to be sent-off. From then on, Stoke lost their focus and put in an abject performance and goals from Dele Alli, Harry Kane and a brace from Son Heung-min earned Spurs a second-straight 4–0 win at Stoke. Afterwards, chairman Peter Coates heavily criticized the team's performance, saying, "We fell to pieces."

There was no improvement the following week away at Crystal Palace as Stoke again put in a woeful performance and conceded four goals for a third time. Scott Dann, James McArthur, James Tomkins and Andros Townsend scored for Palace with Marko Arnautović scoring a last minute consolation. The result kept Stoke rock bottom of the Premier League and increased the pressure on Mark Hughes.

Following their EFL Cup exit to Hull City, Stoke came up against midlands rivals West Bromwich Albion and former manager Tony Pulis, who was in charge of his 1,000th match. In what was a hard fought encounter, Stoke took the lead in the 73rd minute through Joe Allen's first goal for the Potters. Stoke, however, were unable to see out their first win of the season as a mix-up between Bruno Martins Indi and debutant Lee Grant gifted West Brom a late corner which was duly headed in by Salomón Rondón.

=== October ===
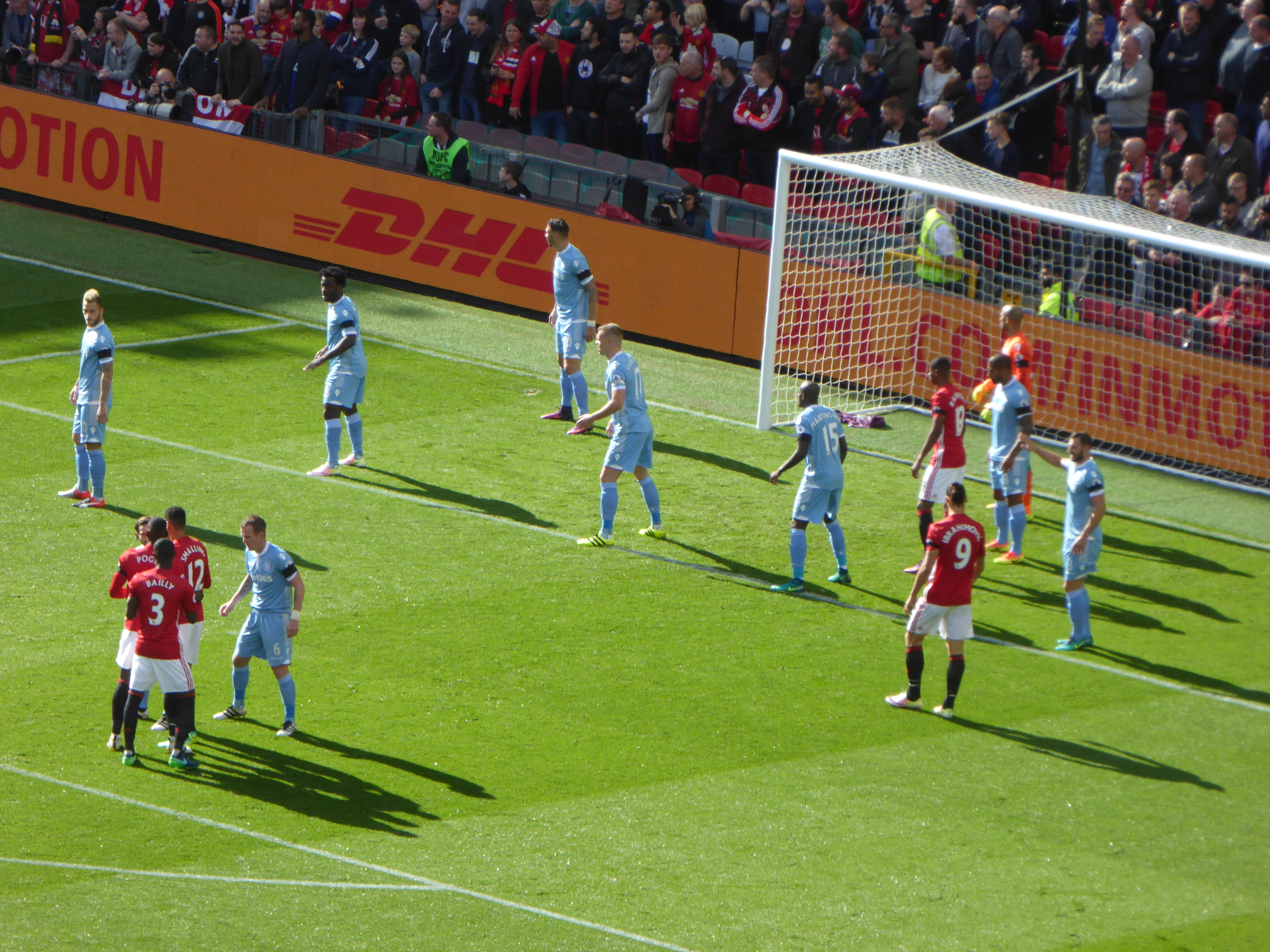
Manchester United v Stoke (2 October 2016)

Stoke then travelled to Old Trafford to play Manchester United on 2 October. Lee Grant made a number of fine saves to deny Manchester United from taking the lead in the first half before he was eventuality beaten by Anthony Martial on 69 minutes. Joe Allen scored for the second match running, earning Stoke a 1–1 draw, their first point at Old Trafford since 1980.

Following the international break, Stoke played against Sunderland, the only other team without a Premier League victory. Stoke won the match 2–0 with Joe Allen scoring twice in the first half to lift some of the pressure off Mark Hughes. Goalkeeper Lee Grant had little to do as the Black Cats put in an inept performance and City earned their first clean sheet in the league since March.

Stoke then travelled to the KCOM Stadium to take on Mike Phelan's Hull City on 22 October. The Potters produced their best performance of the season, comfortably winning the match 2–0 with two long range strikes from Xherdan Shaqiri. The result lifted the team out of the relegation zone and was also Stoke's 100th win in the Premier League. There was an incident after the final whistle where Stoke had three players booked for a confrontation with Sam Clucas.

Swansea City, now under the management of Bob Bradley, made the trip to the Potteries on 31 October. Stoke made the perfect start to the match, with Wilfried Bony scoring his first goal for the against his former employers after just three minutes. The Swans, however, hit back soon after with a header from Wayne Routledge. Stoke then hit the post three times in quick succession before retaking the lead after half time after Ramadan Sobhi's low cross was turned into his own net by Alfie Mawson. Bony scored again late on to earn Stoke a 3–1 victory.

=== November ===
Stoke made their first visit to West Ham United's London Stadium on 5 November. After a drab first half, West Ham took the lead when Michail Antonio's header was deflected in by Glenn Whelan for an own goal. Stoke earned a point after a mistake from Hammers' goalkeeper Adrián let in Bojan to fire into an empty net.

After the international break, Stoke took on Eddie Howe's AFC Bournemouth at home. The Cherries were the better side and took the lead in the first half through a set play which was headed in by Nathan Aké. Stoke did have the chance to draw level but Bojan missed a second half penalty.

The final match of November was against Watford at Vicarage Road. Hughes made five changes to his side which included the return of Giannelli Imbula. It paid off, as Stoke dominated the match and scored the only goal of the encounter in the first half after Charlie Adam's header hit the post but then deflected in off Hornets' goalkeeper Heurelho Gomes for an own goal. It was a poor day for Watford, as they had Miguel Britos sent-off late on for two bookable offences.

=== December ===
Stoke then hosted Sean Dyche's struggling Burnley side for the first match of December. Stoke controlled most of the match and won 2–0 with goals from Jonathan Walters and a first Premier League strike from Marc Muniesa.

The Potters then played away at Arsenal on 10 December and took the lead through a Charlie Adam penalty after Joe Allen had been fouled in the area by Granit Xhaka. Goals from Theo Walcott, Mesut Özil and Alex Iwobi, however, condemned Stoke to a ninth-straight defeat at the Emirates Stadium. There was one positive for Stoke, as Mark Hughes brought on Julien Ngoy for his professional debut.

Claude Puel's Southampton were next visitors at Stoke, and the Saints were given an advantage early on as Arnautović was sent-off by Anthony Taylor for a high challenge on Sofiane Boufal. From then on, Stoke defended deep and were able to grind out a goalless draw.

City then faced the champions Leicester City on 17 December, and after an even opening, the match changed on 28 minutes when Jamie Vardy was sent-off for a two-footed challenge on Mame Diouf. Stoke made the most of their numerical advantage and scored twice through a Bojan penalty and a tap-in from Joe Allen to make it 2–0 at half-time. Stoke, however, produced a woeful second-half performance, and goals from Leonardo Ulloa and Daniel Amartey earned the Foxes a 2–2 draw.

Stoke travelled to Liverpool on 27 December and took an early lead through Jon Walters. Following Adam Lallana's equalizer, however, Stoke capitulated and goals from Roberto Firmino, Daniel Sturridge and an own goal from Imbula condemned Stoke to another Anfield defeat.

Stoke ended a disappointing 2016 with a 4–2 defeat at runaway leaders Chelsea. The Blues scored first through a Gary Cahill header before Martins-Indi scored his first Stoke goal just after half-time. Willian made it 2–1 to Chelsea and Crouch ended a run of 18 months without a goal to draw Stoke level at 2–2. Willian, however, scored again moments later and Diego Costa sealed Chelsea's victory late on.

=== January ===
The Potters began 2017 with a home fixture against Watford. Hughes decided to play his most experienced players to end the run of five games without victory and it worked, with City recording a 2–0 success. Rare goals from Ryan Shawcross and Crouch gave Stoke the three points but Hughes came in for criticism from supporters for his "back to basics" approach.

Following their poor FA Cup exit at the hands of Wolverhampton Wanderers, Stoke resumed league football with a trip to Sunderland. Stoke took the lead through Arnautović, who beat Vito Mannone at the second attempt after being picked out by Shaqiri. City made it 2–0 with Arnautović finishing off a passage of one-touch football and it got better for Stoke as Crouch headed in past a hesitant Mannone. Jermain Defoe pulled one back for the Black Cats just before half-time, but Stoke went on to see out a 3–1 victory, their first league win at the Stadium of Light.

Stoke's final match in January was against Manchester United, who came into the game on the back of an 11-match unbeaten run. Stoke took the lead in fortunate circumstances as Erik Pieters' cross was deflected in by Juan Mata. United proceeded to dominate the remainder of the match, with Stoke having to defend deep against constant pressure. The Red Devils earned a point in injury time as a Wayne Rooney free-kick beat Lee Grant. It was a significant goal for Rooney, as it was his 250th, making him Manchester United's all-time record goalscorer.

=== February ===
Stoke began February with a 1–1 draw at home against Ronald Koeman's Everton. Crouch scored his 100th Premier League goal early into the match after being set up by Arnautović. The Toffees' equaliser came in controversial fashion as their goal was originally disallowed for offside, however after a lengthy discussion, it was given as a Shawcross own goal. Saido Berahino was given his debut by Hughes in the second half, but both sides were content to settle for a point.

The Potters then made the short journey to West Brom, as Berahino came up against his former club. Stoke made a poor start to the match and conceded early with James Morrison firing past Lee Grant. Stoke failed to mount a comeback and the Baggies were easily able to see out the match.

Stoke returned to winning ways the following week at home at Sam Allardyce's struggling Crystal Palace. The match was a drab affair with very little attacking flair on display, Joe Allen scored the only goal of the match on 67 minutes after being set up by Ramadan Sobhi. The result moved the Potters back up to ninth on 32 points.

With no matches for two weeks, Hughes took the opportunity to go a training camp in Dubai prior to the match against Tottenham at White Hart Lane. The Potters put in another abject display against Spurs, crashing to a third consecutive 4–0 defeat. All the goals came in the first half with Harry Kane scoring a hat-tick and Dele Alli completing the rout.

=== March ===
The team then faced a struggling Middlesbrough side at the Bet365 Stadium. Stoke controlled the first half, with Ramadan hitting the crossbar early on and they took the lead on 29 minutes through Marko Arnautović, who rounded Boro goalkeeper Víctor Valdés before scoring. Arnautović scored again on 42 minutes tapping in from close range following a corner. Middlesbrough failed to mount a comeback in the second half and the Potters saw out a comfortable 2–0 victory.

Stoke's next match away against Manchester City was brought forward due to Man City's involvement in the FA Cup quarter-finals. Hughes decided to change formation to 4–4–2 in an attempt to halt the poor run of results against teams from the top six. It paid off, as the Potters put a disciplined defensive performance and were able to see out a 0–0 draw, the first time all season a team had prevented Manchester City from scoring at home.

Stoke then lost 2–1 to Premier League leaders Chelsea on 18 March. A free-kick from Willian gave Chelsea the lead after 13 minutes, with Stoke equalising through a Jon Walters penalty after he was fouled by Gary Cahill. Cahill, however, made amends for his mistake and scored the winning goal for the Blues.

=== April ===
The Potters' first match in April was away against a rejuvenated Leicester City side now under the management of Craig Shakespeare. Stoke struggled all match with the pace of the Foxes' forwards and tamely lost 2–0 with goals from Wilfred Ndidi and Jamie Vardy.

Stoke then traveled to Turf Moor on 4 April for the last mid-week fixture of the season. It was another poor away performance, as the Clarets won 1–0 with a second-half strike from George Boyd.

City then suffered a fourth straight defeat, going down 2–1 at home at Liverpool. Jonathan Walters had given Stoke a first-half lead, but the Reds hit back with two quick goals from Brazilian duo Philippe Coutinho and Roberto Firmino.

Stoke ended a run of four straight defeats with a 3–1 victory against relegation-threatened Hull City. Stoke made a good start to the match and took the lead through Arnautović after six minutes. Stoke missed a number of chances to extended their lead and a succession of Hull corners caused anxiety in the Stoke defence and Harry Maguire draw the Tigers level just after half-time. Hughes then decided to substitute Adam and Berahino for Crouch and Walters which was met with boos from some Stoke supporters. However, a cross from Walters was then headed past Eldin Jakupović by Crouch. Shaqiri sealed the victory with a 25-yard strike.

Stoke played another side battling relegation, Swansea City, the following week. Jack Butland made his return to the side after 13 months out injured as Swansea won 2–0 with goals from Fernando Llorente and Tom Carroll; Marko Arnautović missed a penalty for Stoke.

The final match of a poor April saw Stoke and West Ham United play out a 0–0 draw.

=== May ===
Stoke secured their place in the 2017–18 Premier League on 6 May with a 2–2 draw away at AFC Bournemouth. Cherries midfielder Harry Arter was fortunate not to be sent-off for a strong tackle on Joe Allen early into the match and he later apologized. Stoke took the lead on 33 minutes when an Arnautovic corner was headed into his own net by Lys Mousset ending a run of 629 minutes without an away goal. Junior Stanislas levelled for Bournemouth in the second half before Mame Biram Diouf scored his first goal in 12 months. A Ryan Shawcross own goal, however, meant that the points were shared.

In the final home match of the season, Stoke put in an inept performance, falling 4–1 to Arsenal with goals from Alexis Sánchez, Mesut Özil and two from Olivier Giroud, with Peter Crouch's second-half header a mere consolation. The result prompted an angry reaction from Stoke supporters and increased speculation over Mark Hughes' future.

Stoke ended an uneventful 2016–17 campaign with a 1–0 away victory against Southampton at St Mary's. Crouch scored the only goal of the match on 60 minutes whilst Butland made a number of saves to deny the Saints forwards. The result meant that Stoke ended the season in 13th position with 44 points, which is the worst performance under Hughes. Despite that Hughes believes that he still has the support of the majority of fans.

=== Results ===
Match	Date	Opponent	Venue	Result	Attendance	Scorers	Report
1	13 August 2016	Middlesbrough	A	1–1	32,110	Shaqiri 67'	Report
2	20 August 2016	Manchester City	H	1–4	27,455	Bojan 49' (pen)	Report
3	27 August 2016	Everton	A	0–1	39,581		Report
4	10 September 2016	Tottenham Hotspur	H	0–4	27,835		Report
5	18 September 2016	Crystal Palace	A	1–4	23,781	Arnautović 90+4'	Report
6	24 September 2016	West Bromwich Albion	H	1–1	27,645	Allen 73'	Report
7	2 October 2016	Manchester United	A	1–1	75,251	Allen 82'	Report
8	15 October 2016	Sunderland	H	2–0	27,701	Allen (2) 8', 45+1'	Report
9	22 October 2016	Hull City	A	2–0	18,522	Shaqiri (2) 26', 50'	Report
10	31 October 2016	Swansea City	H	3–1	26,602	Bony (2) 3', 73', Mawson 55' (o.g.)	Report
11	5 November 2016	West Ham United	A	1–1	56,970	Bojan 75'	Report
12	19 November 2016	Bournemouth	H	0–1	27,815		Report
13	27 November 2016	Watford	A	1–0	20,058	Gomes 29' (o.g.)	Report
14	3 December 2016	Burnley	H	2–0	27,306	Walters 20', Muniesa 35'	Report
15	10 December 2016	Arsenal	A	1–3	59,964	Adam 29' (pen)	Report
16	14 December 2016	Southampton	H	0–0	27,002		Report
17	17 December 2016	Leicester City	H	2–2	27,663	Bojan 39' (pen), Allen 45+3'	Report
18	27 December 2016	Liverpool	A	1–4	53,094	Walters 12'	Report
19	31 December 2016	Chelsea	A	2–4	41,601	Martins Indi 46', Crouch 64'	Report
20	3 January 2017	Watford	H	2–0	27,010	Shawcross 45+3', Crouch 49'	Report
21	14 January 2017	Sunderland	A	3–1	42,772	Arnautović (2) 15', 22', Crouch 34'	Report
22	21 January 2017	Manchester United	H	1–1	27,423	Mata 19' (o.g)	Report
23	1 February 2017	Everton	H	1–1	27,612	Crouch 7'	Report
24	4 February 2017	West Bromwich Albion	A	0–1	23,921		Report
25	11 February 2017	Crystal Palace	H	1–0	27,007	Allen 67'	Report
26	26 February 2017	Tottenham Hotspur	A	0–4	31,864		Report
27	4 March 2017	Middlesbrough	H	2–0	27,644	Arnautović (2) 29', 42'	Report
28	8 March 2017	Manchester City	A	0–0	52,265		Report
29	18 March 2017	Chelsea	H	1–2	27,724	Walters 38' (pen)	Report
30	1 April 2017	Leicester City	A	0–2	31,958		Report
31	4 April 2017	Burnley	A	0–1	19,881		Report
32	8 April 2017	Liverpool	H	1–2	27,568	Walters 44'	Report
33	15 April 2017	Hull City	H	3–1	27,505	Arnautović 6', Crouch 66', Shaqiri 80'	Report
34	22 April 2017	Swansea City	A	0–2	20,566		Report
35	29 April 2017	West Ham United	H	0–0	27,628		Report
36	6 May 2017	Bournemouth	A	2–2	11,046	Mousset 33' (o.g.), Diouf 73'	Report
37	13 May 2017	Arsenal	H	1–4	27,535	Crouch 67'	Report
38	21 May 2017	Southampton	A	1–0	31,286	Crouch 60'	Report

=== Final league table ===
Pos	Team	Pld	W	D	L	GF	GA	GD	Pts
11	West Ham United	38	12	9	17	47	64	−17	45
12	Leicester City	38	12	8	18	48	63	−15	44
13	Stoke City	38	11	11	16	41	56	−15	44
14	Crystal Palace	38	12	5	21	50	63	−13	41
15	Swansea City	38	12	5	21	45	70	−25	41

Source: Premier League
Rules for classification: 1) Points; 2) Goal difference; 3) Goals scored; 4) Play-offs (only if needed to decide champion, teams for relegation or teams for UEFA competitions).

== FA Cup ==
Stoke exited this season FA Cup in the third round with a 2–0 home defeat against old Staffordshire rivals Wolverhampton Wanderers thanks to goals from Hélder Costa and Matt Doherty.

Round	Date	Opponent	Venue	Result	Attendance	Scorers	Report
R3	7 January 2017	Wolverhampton Wanderers	H	0–2	21,479		Report

== EFL Cup ==
Stoke were drawn away against League Two side Stevenage in the second round of the re-branded EFL Cup in what was the first meeting between the clubs. Stoke comfortably won the tie 4–0 with Peter Crouch scoring a hat-trick and Phil Bardsley scoring from 30-yards. Stoke were then knocked out of the competition by Hull City despite Marko Arnautović opening the scoring goals from Ryan Mason and Markus Henriksen earned the Tigers passage to the next round.

Round	Date	Opponent	Venue	Result	Attendance	Scorers	Report
R2	23 August 2016	Stevenage	A	4–0	3,363	Crouch (3) 14', 48', 70', Bardsley 32'	Report
R3	21 September 2016	Hull City	H	1–2	10,550	Arnautović 24'	Report

== Squad statistics ==
No.	Pos.	Name	Premier League		FA Cup		League Cup		Total		Discipline	
No.	Pos.	Name	Apps	Goals	Apps	Goals	Apps	Goals	Apps	Goals	Yellow card	Red card
1	GK	(England) Jack Butland	5	0	0	0	0	0	5	0	0	0
2	DF	(Scotland) Phil Bardsley	14(1)	0	0	0	1	1	15(1)	1	6	1
3	DF	(Netherlands) Erik Pieters	35(1)	0	1	0	1(1)	0	37(2)	0	4	0
4	MF	(Wales) Joe Allen	34(2)	6	0(1)	0	2	0	36(3)	6	10	0
5	DF	(Spain) Marc Muniesa	7(3)	1	0	0	1	0	8(3)	1	2	0
6	MF	(Republic of Ireland) Glenn Whelan	26(4)	0	0	0	1	0	27(4)	0	5	0
7	MF	(Republic of Ireland) Stephen Ireland	0	0	0	0	0	0	0	0	0	0
8	DF	(England) Glen Johnson	21(2)	0	1	0	1	0	23(2)	0	1	0
9	FW	(England) Saido Berahino	8(5)	0	0	0	0	0	8(5)	0	0	0
10	FW	(Austria) Marko Arnautović	32	6	1	0	2	1	35	7	9	1
12	FW	(Ivory Coast) Wilfried Bony	9(1)	2	0	0	1	0	10(1)	2	1	0
14	MF	(Netherlands) Ibrahim Afellay	3(9)	0	1	0	0	0	4(9)	0	0	0
15	DF	(Netherlands) Bruno Martins Indi	35	1	1	0	1	0	37	1	6	0
16	MF	(Scotland) Charlie Adam	17(7)	1	0(1)	0	1(1)	0	18(9)	1	7	0
17	DF	(England) Ryan Shawcross (c)	35	1	1	0	2	0	38	1	6	0
18	FW	(Senegal) Mame Biram Diouf	15(12)	1	0	0	0(1)	0	15(13)	1	3	0
19	FW	(Republic of Ireland) Jonathan Walters	13(10)	4	0	0	1	0	14(10)	4	1	0
20	DF	(United States) Geoff Cameron	18(1)	0	0	0	2	0	20(1)	0	2	0
21	MF	(France) Giannelli Imbula	9(3)	0	1	0	1	0	11(3)	0	1	0
22	MF	(Switzerland) Xherdan Shaqiri	21	4	1	0	0	0	22	4	3	0
24	GK	(Republic of Ireland) Shay Given	5	0	0	0	1	0	6	0	1	0
25	FW	(England) Peter Crouch	13(14)	7	1	0	1	3	15(14)	10	3	0
26	DF	(Germany) Philipp Wollscheid	2	0	0	0	0	0	2	0	1	0
27	FW	(Spain) Bojan	5(4)	3	1	0	0(1)	0	6(5)	3	1	0
29	GK	(Denmark) Jakob Haugaard	0	0	0	0	0	0	0	0	0	0
32	MF	(Egypt) Ramadan Sobhi	8(9)	0	0	0	1(1)	0	9(10)	0	2	0
33	GK	(England) Lee Grant	28	0	1	0	1	0	30	0	1	0
45	FW	(Belgium) Julien Ngoy	0(5)	0	0(1)	0	0	0	0(6)	0	0	0
–	–	Own goals	–	4	–	0	–	0	–	4	–	–

== Transfers ==
=== In ===
Date	Pos.	Name	From	Fee	Ref.
25 July 2016	MF	(Wales) Joe Allen	(England) Liverpool	£13 million	
25 July 2016	MF	(Egypt) Ramadan Sobhi	(Egypt) Al Ahly	£5 million	
5 August 2016	DF	(Republic of Ireland) Ryan Sweeney	(England) AFC Wimbledon	£250,000	
31 August 2016	DF	(England) Cameron McJannet	(England) Luton Town	Undisclosed	
29 September 2016	DF	(Scotland) Harry Souttar	(Scotland) Dundee United	Undisclosed	
4 January 2017	GK	(England) Lee Grant	(England) Derby County	£1.3 million	
20 January 2017	FW	(England) Saido Berahino	(England) West Bromwich Albion	£12 million	

=== Out ===
Date	Pos.	Name	To	Fee	Ref.
1 July 2016	DF	(England) Ben Barber	(England) York City	Free	
1 July 2016	FW	(Nigeria) Peter Odemwingie	(England) Rotherham United	Free	
1 July 2016	MF	(England) Steve Sidwell	(England) Brighton & Hove Albion	Free	
1 July 2016	MF	(England) Ed Dryden	Released	Free	
1 July 2016	DF	(Republic of Ireland) Bobby Moseley	(England) Solihull Moors	Free	
1 July 2016	DF	(Republic of Ireland) Ryan O'Reilly	Released	Free	
1 July 2016	FW	(Australia) Peter Skapetis	Released	Free	
1 July 2016	DF	(Republic of Ireland) Mason Watkins-Clark	Released	Free	
1 July 2016	FW	(Germany) Yusuf Çoban	(Germany) 1899 Hoffenheim	Free	
1 July 2016	GK	(Australia) Dominic Kurasik	(England) Brentford	Free	
1 July 2016	GK	(Australia) Chris Marques	(England) Nottingham Forest	Free	
1 July 2016	DF	(England) Toby Wells	(Scotland) Aberdeen	Free	
15 August 2016	DF	(Republic of Ireland) Marc Wilson	(England) AFC Bournemouth	£2 million	
26 January 2017	DF	(Slovakia) Dionatan Teixeira	Released	Free	
30 January 2017	MF	(Spain) Sergio Molina	(Spain) Abacete	Undisclosed	

=== Loan in ===
Date from	Date to	Pos.	Name	From	Ref.
31 August 2016	30 June 2017	FW	(Ivory Coast) Wilfried Bony	(England) Manchester City	
31 August 2016	3 January 2017	GK	(England) Lee Grant	(England) Derby County	
31 August 2016	30 June 2017	DF	(Netherlands) Bruno Martins Indi	(Portugal) Porto	

=== Loan out ===
Date from	Date to	Pos.	Name	To	Ref.
1 July 2016	1 September 2016	MF	(England) Mark Waddington	(Scotland) Kilmarnock	
15 August 2016	1 January 2017	MF	(Morocco) Moha El Ouriachi	(England) Shrewsbury Town	
15 August 2016	1 January 2017	FW	(England) George Waring	(England) Shrewsbury Town	
31 August 2016	End of Season	DF	(Germany) Philipp Wollscheid	(Germany) VfL Wolfsburg	
31 August 2016	End of Season	FW	(Spain) Joselu	(Spain) Deportivo La Coruña	
9 January 2017	End of Season	GK	(Denmark) Jakob Haugaard	(England) Wigan Athletic	
20 January 2017	End of Season	MF	(England) Ollie Shenton	(Wales) Wrexham	
20 January 2017	End of Season	DF	(Republic of Ireland) Ryan Sweeney	(England) Bristol Rovers	
25 January 2017	End of Season	DF	(England) Joel Taylor	(England) Rochdale	
28 January 2017	End of Season	MF	(Morocco) Moha El Ouriachi	(Scotland) Hearts	
29 January 2017	End of Season	FW	(Spain) Bojan	(Germany) Mainz 05	
31 January 2017	End of Season	FW	(England) George Waring	(England) Carlisle United	
