= Kenneth Amponsah-Yiadom =

Ghanaian politician

MP for Offinso South
- In office 7 January 1993 – 6 January 1997
- President: Jerry John Rawlings
- Preceded by: Constituency merged
- Succeeded by: Francis Kwasi Buor

Personal details
- Born: Offinso, Ashanti Region, Ghana
- Party: National Democratic Congress
- Education: University of Ghana
- Occupation: Politician
- Profession: Farmer, librarian

Kenneth Amponsah-Yiadom is a Ghanaian politician and a member of the First Parliament of the Fourth Republic representing the Offinso South Constituency in the Ashanti Region of Ghana. He represented the National Democratic Congress.

== Early life and education ==
Kenneth Amponsah-Yiadom was born in Offinso in the Ashanti Region of Ghana. He attended Prempeh College and the University of Ghana where he obtained a bachelor's degree in Political Science and a Postgraduate diploma in Library Science.

== Politics ==
Kenneth Amponsah-Yiadom was first elected into parliament on the ticket of the National Democratic Congress as a member of parliament for the Offinso South constituency in the Ashanti Region during the 1992 Ghanaian parliamentary election. He was defeated by Francis Kwasi Buor of the New Patriotic Party during the 1996 Ghanaian general election.

== Career ==
He is a farmer and a librarian by profession and was a former member of parliament for the Offinso South Constituency in the Ashanti Region of Ghana from 1993 to 1997.

== Personal life ==
He is a Christian.
