= Yiadom =

Yiadom is a Ghanaian surname. Notable people with this name include:

- Andy Yiadom (born 1991), English-born Ghanaian footballer
- Charles Konadu-Yiadom (born 1968), Ghanaian politician
- Isaac Yiadom (born 1996), American football cornerback
- Kenneth Amponsah-Yiadom, Ghanaian politician
- Konadu Yiadom (born 2000), Ghanaian footballer
- Nana Konadu Yiadom III, Queen Mother of the Ashanti Kingdom

== See also ==
- Boakye-Yiadom
