= Nana Boakye-Yiadom =

Nana Boakye-Yiadom may refer to:

- Nana Boakye-Yiadom (footballer) (born 1996), English footballer
- Nana Boakye-Yiadom (journalist) (born 1983), Ghanaian journalist
