= Brad Abbott =

English footballer (born 1994)

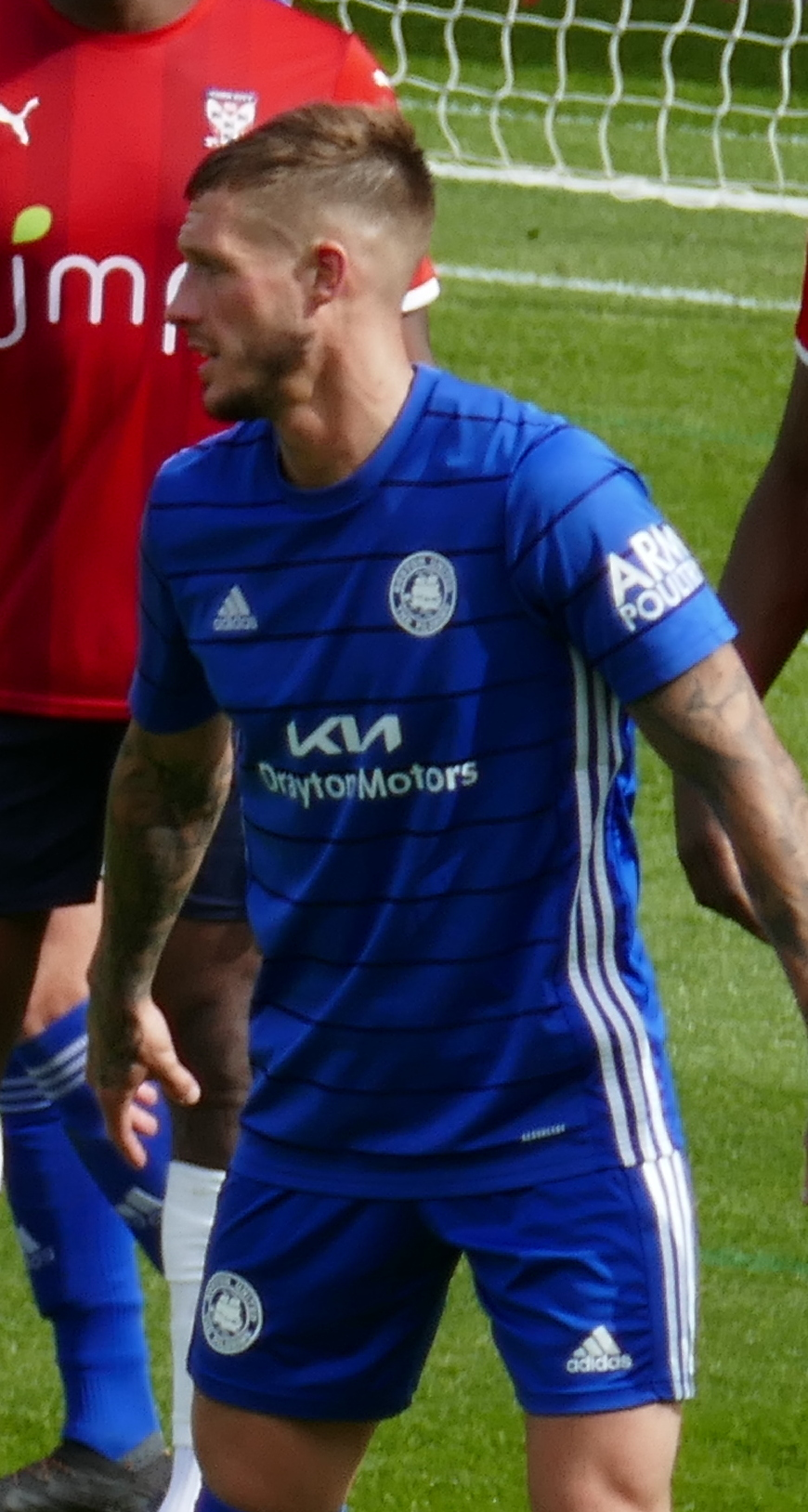
- Abbott playing for Boston United in 2022

Personal information
- Full name: Bradley Ian Abbott
- Date of birth: 24 December 1994 (age 31)
- Place of birth: Doncaster, England
- Position: Midfielder

Team information
- Current team: Cleethorpes Town

Youth career
- –2013: Barnsley

Senior career*
Years	Team	Apps	(Gls)
2013–2016	Barnsley	5	(0)
2013–2014	→ Harrogate Town (loan)	7	(0)
2015	→ Chester (loan)	16	(1)
2016	→ Barrow (loan)	5	(0)
2016–2017	Buxton	56	(8)
2017–2020	Boston United	92	(13)
2020–2021	Grantham Town	7	(0)
2021–2022	Spennymoor Town	15	(2)
2022	Boston United	27	(2)
2022–2023	Matlock Town	13	(1)
2023–2024	Ashton United	24	(0)
2024–	Cleethorpes Town	66	(4)
- * Club domestic league appearances and goals as of 06:44, 2 March 2026 (UTC)

Bradley Ian Abbott (born 24 December 1994) is an English professional footballer who plays as a midfielder for Northern Premier League Premier Division club Cleethorpes Town.

== Playing career ==
Abbott began his career at Barnsley, from where he was loaned out to Harrogate Town in November 2013. He played seven Conference North and cup game for the club before returning to Barnsley after picking up a back injury. He signed a new contract with the "Tykes" in May 2014. In March 2016 he signed for Barrow on loan until the end of the season.

On 12 May 2016, Abbott was released by Barnsley.

== Statistics ==
As of 2 March 2026

Appearances and goals by club, season and competition
Club	Season	League			FA Cup		League Cup		Other		Total	
Club	Season	Division	Apps	Goals	Apps	Goals	Apps	Goals	Apps	Goals	Apps	Goals
Barnsley	2013–14	Championship	0	0	0	0	0	0	0	0	0	0
Barnsley	2014–15	League One	5	0	1	0	0	0	2 (Note: Appearance(s) in Football League Trophy)	0	8	0
Barnsley	2015–16	League One	0	0	0	0	0	0	1	0	1	0
Barnsley	Total		5	0	1	0	0	0	3	0	9	0
Harrogate Town (loan)	2013–14	Conference North	7	0	0	0	—		0	0	7	0
Chester (loan)	2014–15	Conference Premier	16	1	—		—		0	0	16	1
Barrow (loan)	2015–16	National League	5	0	0	0	—		0	0	5	0
Buxton	2016–17	NPL Premier Division	41	6	1	0	4	0	4 (Note: Two appearances and one goal in FA Trophy, two appearances and two goals in Derbyshire Senior Cup)	3	50	9
Buxton	2017–18	NPL Premier Division	15	2	2	0	–		1 (Note: Appearance(s) in FA Trophy)	0	18	2
Buxton	Total		56	8	3	0	4	0	5	3	68	11
Boston United	2017–18	National League North	22	4	—		—		0	0	22	4
Boston United	2018–19	National League North	40	5	1	0	—		2	0	43	5
Boston United	2019–20	National League North	30	4	5	0	—		2 (Note: Appearance(s) in National League North play-offs)	0	37	4
Boston United	Total		92	13	6	0	—		4	0	102	13
Grantham Town	2020–21	NPL Premier Division	7	0	2	0	—		0	0	9	0
Spennymoor Town	2021–22	National League North	15	2	4	2	—		2	0	21	4
Boston United	2021–22	National League North	20	2	—		—		0	0	20	2
Boston United	2022–23	National League North	7	0	2	0	—		0	0	9	0
Boston United	Total		27	2	2	0	—		0	0	29	2
Matlock Town	2022–23	NPL Premier Division	13	1	—		—		2 (Note: One appearance and one goal in NPL Premier Division play-offs, one appearance in Derbyshire Senior Cup)	1	15	2
Ashton United	2023–24	NPL Premier Division	24	0	2	0	—		3 (Note: Appearance(s) in Manchester Premier Cup)	1	29	1
Cleethorpes Town	2024–25	NPL Division One East	42	3	4	1	—		6 (Note: Two appearances in FA Trophy, four appearances in Lincolnshire Senior Cup)	0	52	4
Cleethorpes Town	2025–26	NPL Premier Division	24	1	1	0	—		2 (Note: Appearance(s) in Lincolnshire Senior Cup)	0	27	1
Cleethorpes Town	Total		66	4	5	1	—		8	0	79	5
Career total			333	31	25	3	4	0	27	5	389	42
