= 2014–15 Barnsley F.C. season =

Barnsley F.C.
2014–15 season
- Chairman: Maurice Watkins
- Head Coach: Danny Wilson (until 12 February); Lee Johnson (from 25 February)
- League One: 11th
- FA Cup: Third round (eliminated by Middlesbrough)
- League Cup: First round (eliminated by Crewe Alexandra)
- Football League Trophy: Second round (eliminated by Oldham Athletic)
- Top goalscorer: League: Conor Hourihane (7); All: Conor Hourihane (7)
- Highest home attendance: 10,499 vs Bradford City (L1, 18 Oct 14)
- Lowest home attendance: 4,218 vs York City (LT, 2 Sep 14)
- Average home league attendance: 8,106
Home colours	Away colours	Third colours

The 2014–15 season was Barnsley's first season back in Football League One after being relegated the previous season.

== Kit ==
Supplier: Avec

Home	Away

Last updated: 28 June 2014.

== Squad ==
No.	Name	Position (s)	Nationality	Place of birth	Date of birth (age)	Club caps	Club goals	Signed from	Date signed	Fee	Contract end
Goalkeepers
1	Ross Turnbull	GK	(England)	Bishop Auckland	4 January 1985 (age 41)	35	0	Doncaster Rovers	23 July 2014	Free	2016
12	Adam Davies	GK	(England)	Rheinstein	17 July 1992 (age 34)	9	0	Sheffield Wednesday	13 June 2014	Free	2016
24	Christian Dibble	GK	(Wales)	Wilmslow	11 May 1994 (age 32)	0	0	Bury	1 July 2013	Free	2015
Defenders
2	Reece Brown	RB	(England)	Manchester	1 November 1991 (age 35)	12	0	Watford	31 July 2014	Undisclosed	2015
3	Joe Dudgeon	LB	(England)	Leeds	26 November 1990 (age 35)	12	0	Hull City	31 July 2014	Loan	2015
5	Lewin Nyatanga	CB/LB	(Wales)	Burton upon Trent	18 August 1988 (age 38)	80	2	Bristol City	9 July 2013	Free	2015
6	Martin Cranie	CB	(England)	Yeovil	23 September 1986 (age 40)	105	1	Coventry City	20 August 2012	Free	2015
15	Jean-Yves Mvoto	CB	(France)	Paris	6 September 1988 (age 38)	34	2	Oldham Athletic	23 July 2013	Free	2015
16	Peter Ramage	CB/LB	(England)	Whitley Bay	22 November 1983 (age 42)	30	1	Crystal Palace	3 October 2014	Loan	2015
20	George Smith	LB	(England)	Barnsley	14 August 1996 (age 30)	0	0	Academy	2 June 2014	Trainee	Undisclosed
28	Jack Cowgill	CB	(England)	Wakefield	8 January 1997 (age 29)	0	0	Academy	1 July 2014	Trainee	2016
29	James Bree	RB/CM	(England)	Wakefield	11 October 1997 (age 29)	11	0	Academy	11 October 2014	Trainee	2017
Midfielders
4	Luke Berry	RM/CM	(England)		12 July 1992 (age 34)	14	0	Cambridge United	30 July 2014	Free	2017
7	Keith Treacy	RW/LW	(Republic of Ireland)	Dublin	13 September 1988 (age 38)	11	0	Burnley	6 August 2014	Free	2016
8	Conor Hourihane	CM	(Republic of Ireland)	Cork	2 February 1991 (age 35)	17	7	Plymouth Argyle	23 June 2014	£200,000	2017
11	Dale Jennings	LW/RW	(England)	Liverpool	21 December 1992 (age 33)	36	4	Bayern Munich	18 June 2013	£250,000	2016
13	Ryan Williams	LW/RW	(Australia)	Subiaco	28 November 1993 (age 32)	6	0	Fulham	2 October 2014	Loan	2014
14	Paul Digby	CM	(England)	Sheffield	2 February 1995 (age 31)	14	0	Academy	1 July 2011	Trainee	2017
17	Brad Abott	CM	(England)		24 December 1994 (age 31)	4	0	Academy	1 July 2013	Trainee	Undisclosed
19	Reuben Noble-Lazarus	WG/CF	(England)	Huddersfield	16 August 1993 (age 33)	49	3	Academy	29 September 2008	Trainee	2015
21	Darren McKnight	CM/RB	(Northern Ireland)	County Antrim	27 August 1995 (age 31)	0	0	Academy	4 July 2014	Trainee	2015
22	Dominic McHale	WG	(England)	Manchester	1 January 1995 (age 31)	1	0	Manchester City	February 2014	Free	2015
32	James Bailey	CM/RM	(England)	Bollington	18 September 1988 (age 38)	11	0	Derby County	22 July 2014	Free	2016
Forwards
9	Sam Winnall	CF/WG	(England)	Wolverhampton	19 January 1991 (age 35)	16	4	Scunthorpe United	24 July 2014	Undisclosed	2017
10	Kane Hemmings	CF	(England)	Burton upon Trent	8 April 1992 (age 34)	11	1	Cowdenbeath	19 June 2014	Free	2016
16	Danny Rose	CF	(England)	Barnsley	10 December 1993 (age 32)	18	2	Academy	30 March 2011	Trainee	2016
18	Rhys Oates	CM	(England)	Pontefract	4 December 1994 (age 31)	1	0	Academy	1 July 2013	Trainee	2015
23	Nana Boakye-Yiadom	CF	(England)	London		2	0	Academy	29 May 2014	Trainee	Undisclosed
26	George Maris	CF	(England)	Sheffield	6 March 1996 (age 30)	0	0	Academy	29 May 2014	Trainee	Undisclosed
31	Marcello Trotta	CF	(Italy)	Santa Maria Capua Vetere	29 September 1992 (age 34)	0	0	Fulham	1 November 2014	Loan	2015
33	Leroy Lita	CF	(England)	Kinshasa	28 December 1984 (age 41)	10	2	Swansea City	8 August 2014	Free	2015
44	Devante Cole	CF	(England)	Alderley Edge	10 May 1995 (age 31)	14	5	Manchester City	19 August 2014	Loan	2015

=== Statistics ===
As of 4 November 2014

No.	Pos	Nat	Player	Total		League One		FA Cup		League Cup		League Trophy	
No.	Pos	Nat	Player	Apps	Goals	Apps	Goals	Apps	Goals	Apps	Goals	Apps	Goals
1	GK	(England) ENG	Ross Turnbull	8	0	8	0	0	0	0	0	0	0
2	DF	(England) ENG	Reece Brown	12	0	8+2	0	0	0	1	0	1	0
3	DF	(England) ENG	Joe Dudgeon (on loan from Hull City)	12	0	11	0	0	0	0	0	1	0
4	MF	(England) ENG	Luke Berry	14	0	13	0	0	0	0	0	0+1	0
5	DF	(Wales) WAL	Lewin Nyatanga	14	0	12	0	0	0	1	0	1	0
6	DF	(England) ENG	Martin Cranie	17	1	15	1	0	0	1	0	1	0
7	MF	(Republic of Ireland) IRL	Keith Treacy	10	0	6+3	0	0	0	1	0	0	0
8	MF	(Republic of Ireland) IRL	Conor Hourihane	17	7	15	7	0	0	1	0	1	0
9	FW	(England) ENG	Sam Winnall	17	4	12+3	4	0	0	1	0	1	0
10	FW	(England) ENG	Kane Hemmings	11	2	3+7	1	0	0	0	0	0+1	1
11	MF	(England) ENG	Dale Jennings	9	1	4+4	1	0	0	0	0	1	0
12	GK	(England) ENG	Adam Davies	9	0	7	0	0	0	1	0	1	0
13	MF	(Australia) AUS	Ryan Williams (on loan from Fulham)	6	0	5+1	0	0	0	0	0	0	0
14	MF	(England) ENG	Paul Digby	5	0	1+4	0	0	0	0	0	0	0
15	DF	(France) FRA	Jean-Yves Mvoto	4	0	3	0	0	0	0+1	0	0	0
16	DF	(England) ENG	Peter Ramage (on loan from Crystal Palace)	6	1	6	1	0	0	0	0	0	0
17	MF	(England) ENG	Brad Abbott	4	0	3	0	0	0	0	0	1	0
18	FW	(England) ENG	Rhys Oates	1	0	0+1	0	0	0	0	0	0	0
19	MF	(England) ENG	Reuben Noble-Lazarus	2	0	0+1	0	0	0	1	0	0	0
20	DF	(England) ENG	George Smith	0	0	0	0	0	0	0	0	0	0
21	MF	(England) ENG	Darren McKnight	0	0	0	0	0	0	0	0	0	0
22	MF	(England) ENG	Dominic McHale	1	0	0	0	0	0	0+1	0	0	0
23	FW	(England) ENG	Nana Boakye-Yiadom	2	0	0+1	0	0	0	0+1	0	0	0
24	GK	(Wales) WAL	Christian Dibble	0	0	0	0	0	0	0	0	0	0
26	FW	(England) ENG	George Maris	0	0	0	0	0	0	0	0	0	0
28	DF	(England) ENG	Jack Cowgill	0	0	0	0	0	0	0	0	0	0
29	DF	(England) ENG	James Bree	10	0	5+3	0	0	0	1	0	1	0
32	MF	(England) ENG	James Bailey	11	0	9+1	0	0	0	1	0	0	0
33	FW	(England) ENG	Leroy Lita	11	2	6+4	2	0	0	1	0	0	0
44	FW	(England) ENG	Devante Cole (on loan from Manchester City)	14	5	9+4	4	0	0	0	0	1	1
Players who have left the club
16	FW	(England) ENG	Danny Rose	1	0	1	0	0	0	0	0	0	0

==== Captains ====
As of 4 November 2014

No.	P	Name	Country	No. games	Notes
6	DF	Martin Cranie	(England)	17	

Source: Competitive match reports.
Competitive matches only
Matches started as captain only
Country: FIFA nationality; No.: Squad number; P: Position; Name: Player name; No. Games: Number of games started as captain.

==== Goalscoring record ====
Rank	No.	Pos.	Name	League One	FA Cup	League Cup	League Trophy	Total
1	8	MF	Conor Hourihane	7	0	0	0	7
2	44	FW	Devante Cole	4	0	0	1	5
3	9	FW	Sam Winnall	4	0	0	0	4
4	10	FW	Kane Hemmings	1	0	0	1	2
4	33	FW	Leroy Lita	2	0	0	0	2
6	6	DF	Martin Cranie	1	0	0	0	1
6	11	MF	Dale Jennings	1	0	0	0	1
6	16	DF	Peter Ramage	1	0	0	0	1
Own Goals				1	0	0	0	1
Total				23	0	0	2	25

==== Disciplinary record ====
No.	Pos.	Name	League One		FA Cup		League Cup		League Trophy		Total	
No.	Pos.	Name	Yellow card	Red card	Yellow card	Red card	Yellow card	Red card	Yellow card	Red card	Yellow card	Red card
1	GK	Ross Turnbull	1	0	0	0	0	0	0	0	1	0
3	DF	Joe Dudgeon	1	0	0	0	0	0	1	0	2	0
5	DF	Lewin Nyatanga	2	0	0	0	0	0	0	0	2	0
6	DF	Martin Cranie	4	0	0	0	0	0	0	0	4	0
7	MF	Keith Treacy	1	0	0	0	0	0	0	0	1	0
8	MF	Conor Hourihane	4	0	0	0	0	0	0	0	4	0
9	FW	Sam Winnall	2	0	0	0	0	0	0	0	2	0
11	MF	Dale Jennings	0	1	0	0	0	0	1	0	1	1
13	MF	Ryan Williams	1	0	0	0	0	0	0	0	1	0
16	FW	Danny Rose	1	0	0	0	0	0	0	0	1	0
17	MF	Brad Abbott	1	0	0	0	0	0	0	0	1	0
32	MF	James Bailey	1	1	0	0	0	0	0	0	1	1
44	FW	Devante Cole	3	0	0	0	0	0	0	0	3	0
Total			22	2	0	0	0	0	2	0	25	2

==== Suspensions served ====
Date	Matches missed	Player	Reason	Opponents missed
9 August	3	Dale Jennings	(red card) vs Crawley	Crewe (LC), Crewe (A), Coventry (A)
21 October	1	James Bailey	(yellow card) (yellow-red card) vs Peterborough	Notts County (H)

=== Contracts ===
No.	Pos.	Nat.	Name	Age	Status	Contract length	Expiry date	Source
24	GK	(Wales) (England)	Christian Dibble	20	Signed	1 year	June 2015	
21	MF	(England)	Jacob Mellis	23	Rejected	Rejected	June 2014	
7	MF	(Republic of Ireland) (Scotland)	Jim O'Brien	26	Rejected	Rejected	June 2014	
19	MF	(Poland)	Tomasz Cywka	26	Rejected	Rejected	June 2014	
8	MF	(Republic of Ireland)	Stephen Dawson	28	Rejected	Rejected	June 2014	
21	MF	(Northern Ireland)	Darren McKnight	18	Signed	6 months	January 2015	

== Match details ==
=== Pre-season matches ===
12 July 2014	FC Halifax Town	2–0	Barnsley	Halifax, England
15:00 BST	Pearson 41'; Boden 44'	Report		Stadium: The Shay; Attendance: 1,257 (690 Reds); Referee: Geoff Eltringham

20 July 2014	Torino	5–0	Barnsley	Brunico
16:30 BST	Larrondo 16', 26', 43'; El Kaddouri 41'; Barreto 49'	Report		Stadium: Parco sportivo Riscione di Brunico; Attendance: 500

26 July 2014	Barnsley	1–1	Hull City	Barnsley, England
15:00 BST	Hourihane 63'	Report	Long 48'	Stadium: Oakwell; Attendance: 2,929; Referee: Andy Madley

29 July 2014	Barnsley	1–2	Manchester United XI	Barnsley, England
19:00 BST	Mvoto 88'	Report	Harrop 11', 32'	Stadium: Oakwell; Attendance: 3,385 (135 away)

2 August 2014	Barnsley	1–1	Sheffield Wednesday	Barnsley, England
13:00 BST	Rose 30'	Report	Lee 48'	Stadium: Oakwell; Attendance: 5,193

=== League One ===
==== League table ====
Pos	Team	Pld	W	D	L	GF	GA	GD	Pts
9	Peterborough United	46	18	9	19	53	56	−3	63
10	Fleetwood Town	46	17	12	17	49	52	−3	63
11	Barnsley	46	17	11	18	62	61	+1	62
12	Gillingham	46	16	14	16	65	66	−1	62
13	Doncaster Rovers	46	16	13	17	58	62	−4	61

Updated to match(es) played on 3 May 2015. Source: BBC Sport
Rules for classification: 1) Points; 2) Goal difference; 3) Number of goals scored

==== Matches ====
9 August 2014 1	Barnsley	0–1	Crawley Town	Barnsley
15:00	Rose (yellow card) 23'; Jennings (red card) 62'	Report	Young (yellow card) 30'; Smith (yellow card) 45+3'; Edwards (yellow card) 62'; McLeod (yellow card) 78' (goal) 82'	Stadium: Oakwell; Attendance: 10,105; Referee: Jeremy Simpson

16 August 2014 2	Crewe Alexandra	1–2	Barnsley	Crewe
15:00	Waters 22'; Oliver (yellow card) 63'	Report	Lita 57'; Winnall (yellow card) 71'; Cranie (yellow card) 73' (goal) 75'	Stadium: Gresty Road; Attendance: 4,502; Referee: Andrew Davies

19 August 2014 3	Coventry City	2–2	Barnsley	Coventry
19:45	McQuoid 4'; Clarke (yellow card) 33' (goal) 44'	Report	Hourihane 31' (yellow card) 90+3'; Lita 45+3'; Cranie (yellow card) 74'	Stadium: Ricoh Arena; Attendance: 2,376; Referee: (England) Pat Miller

23 August 2014 4	Barnsley	4–1	Gillingham	Barnsley
15:00	Hourihane 22'; Winnall 30'; Cole 68'; Jennings 76'; Cranie (yellow card) 78'	Report	(yellow card) 66' Legge; 74' Kedwell	Stadium: Oakwell; Attendance: 9,163; Referee: Carl Berry

30 August 2014 5	Yeovil Town	1–1	Barnsley	Yeovil
15:00	Edwards (yellow card) 56'; Cranie 76' (o.g.); Sokolik (yellow card) 90+2'	Report	(yellow card) 13' Treacy; 27' (yellow card) 62' Hourihane; (yellow card) 89' Cole	Stadium: Huish Park; Attendance: 3,991; Referee: Gavin Ward

13 September 2014 6	Barnsley	3–5	Milton Keynes Dons	Barnsley
15:00	Abbott (yellow card) 37'; Hourihane 82' 87'; Cole 90+1'		Afobe 33'; Randall (yellow card) 35'; Carruthers 45+1'; Alli 52'; Grigg 71'; Reeves 79'	Stadium: Oakwell; Attendance: 9,192; Referee: Carl Boyeson

17 September 2014 7	Fleetwood Town	0–0	Barnsley	Fleetwood
19:45		Report		Stadium: Highbury Stadium; Attendance: 3,535; Referee: Darren Bond

20 September 2014 8	Port Vale	2–1	Barnsley	Burslem
15:00	O'Connor 24'; Dickinson (yellow card) 64'; Marshall 89'		Hourihane 59' (pen.) (yellow card) 61'; Cranie (yellow card) 73'	Stadium: Vale Park; Attendance: 5,415; Referee: Dean Whitestone

27 September 2014 9	Barnsley	0–3	Swindon Town	Barnsley
15:00		Report	(yellow card) 43' Stephens; 58' Byrne; 82' Reeves; 83' Williams	Stadium: Oakwell; Attendance: 8,879; Referee: Chris Kavanagh

4 October 2014 10	Rochdale	0–1	Barnsley	Rochdale
15:00		Report	Ramage 10'; Cole (yellow card) 29'; Hourihane (yellow card) 85'	Stadium: Spotland Stadium; Attendance: 4,380; Referee: Kevin Wright

12 October 2014 11	Barnsley	3–1	Bradford City	Barnsley
15:00	Nyatanga (yellow card) 46'; McArdle 48' (o.g.); Cole (yellow card) 54'; Winnall 65'; Hemmings 90+6'	Report	1' Kennedy; (yellow card) 26' Liddle; (yellow card) 37' Sheehan	Stadium: Oakwell; Attendance: 10,499; Referee: Andy Madley

18 October 2014 12	Peterborough United	2–1	Barnsley	Peterborough
15:00	Washington 45'; Maddison 69'	Report	15' Cole; (yellow card) 47' Williams; (yellow card) 68' (yellow-red card) 77' Bailey	Stadium: London Road Stadium; Attendance: 7,217; Referee: Charles Breakspear

21 October 2014 13	Barsnley	2–3	Notts County	Barnsley
19:45	Cole 8'; Hourihane 12'	Report	20' Thompson; 62', 71' Petrasso; (yellow card) 89' McLaughlin	Stadium: Oakwell; Attendance: 8,596; Referee: Seb Stockbridge

25 October 2014 14	Barnsley	2–2	Bristol City	Barnsley
15:00	Ayling 36'; Wilbraham 79'	Report	(yellow card) 58' (goal) 59' Winnall; 68' (pen.) Hourihane	Stadium: Oakwell; Attendance: 9,000; Referee: Darren Deadman

1 November 2014 15	Sheffield United	0–1	Barnsley	Sheffield
15:00		Report	56' Winnall; (yellow card) 71' Dudgeon; (yellow card) 79' Turnbull	Stadium: Bramall Lane; Attendance: 24,495; Referee: Scott Mathieson

14 November 2014 16	Barnsley	3–2	Colchester United	Barnsley
19:45	Winnall 4'; Ramage (yellow card) 49' (goal) 70'; Hourihane 55' (pen.)	BBC Report	Watt 15'; Sears 75'	Stadium: Oakwell; Attendance: 9,191; Referee: Richard Clark

22 November 2014 17	Chesterfield	2–1	Barnsley	Chesterfield
15:00	Doyle 42', 58' (yellow card) 89'; Darikwa (yellow card) 49'	Report	Hourihane (yellow card) 47'; Treacy 85'	Stadium: Proact Stadium; Attendance: 8,544; Referee: Andre Marriner

29 November 2014 18	Barnsley	1–2	Scunthorpe United	Barnsley
15:00	Cranie (yellow card) 21'; Berry (yellow card) 25'; Trotta 29'	Report	Madden 30' 45+2'; Llera (yellow card) 65'; Williams (yellow card) 86'	Stadium: Oakwell; Attendance: 9,340; Referee: (England) James Linington

2 December 2014 19	Barnsley	1–1	Doncaster Rovers	Barnsley
19:45	Nyatanga 5' (yellow card) 29'	Report	Robinson 52'	Stadium: Oakwell; Attendance: 10,058; Referee: Nigel Miller

13 December 2014 20	Walsall	3–1	Barnsley	Walsall
15:00	Bradshaw (yellow card) 10' (goal) 34'; Cook 31', 90+4'	Report	Nyatanga 29'; Abbott (yellow card) 48'; Cranie (yellow card) 74'; Berry (yellow card) 90+3'	Stadium: Bescot Stadium; Attendance: 4,433; Referee: Trevor Kettle

20 December 2014 21	Barnsley	2–0	Leyton Orient	Barnsley
15:00	Hourihane 13'; Cole 38'; Hemmings (yellow card) 58'; Turnbull (red card) 73'	Report	Cox (yellow card) 66'; McAnuff (yellow card) 67'	Stadium: Oakwell; Attendance: 8,742; Referee: Mark Brown

26 December 2014 22	Preston North End	1–0	Barnsley	Preston
15:00	Gallagher 16' (pen.) (yellow card) 31'; Welsh (yellow card) 87'	Report	Berry (yellow card) 75'; Holgate (yellow card) 86'	Stadium: Deepdale; Attendance: 13,793; Referee: Paul Tierney

10 January 2015 23	Barnsley	2–0	Yeovil Town	Barnsley
15:00	Waring 50'; Hourihane 75' (pen.)	Report	Nugent (red card) 26'; Foley (yellow card) 28'; Steer (yellow card) 74'; Edwards (yellow card) 85'	Stadium: Oakwell; Attendance: 8,518; Referee: (England) Peter Bankes

17 January 2015 24	Doncaster Rovers	1–0	Barnsley	Doncaster
15:00	Stevens (yellow card) 35'; Forrester 84'	Report	Nyatanga (yellow card) 61'; Waring (yellow card) 71'; Berry (yellow card) 80'; Mason Holgate (red card) 90+3'	Stadium: Keepmoat Stadium; Attendance: 9,005; Referee: (England) Kevin Wright

24 January 2015 26	Milton Keynes Dons	2–0	Barnsley	Milton Keynes
15:00	Alli 57'; Grigg 63'	Report	Pearson (yellow card) 56'	Stadium: Stadium mk Attendance: 8,310; Referee: Chris Kavanagh

31 January 2015 27	Barnsley	2–1	Port Vale	Barnsley
15:00	Neal 45+2' (o.g.); Pearson 46' (yellow card) 90+4'; Mvoto (yellow card) 67'; Waring (yellow card) 90'; Scowen (yellow card) 90+2'	Report	O'Connor (yellow card) 45'; Dickinson (yellow card) 45+3'; Daniel 66'	Stadium: Oakwell; Attendance: 8,660; Referee: Graham Salisbury

3 February 2015 27	Barnsley	1–0	Oldham Athletic	Barnsley
19:45	Hemmings 12'	Report	Wilson (yellow card) 35'	Stadium: Oakwell; Attendance: 9,135; Referee: Steve Martin

7 February 2015 28	Swindon Town	2–0	Barnsley	Swindon
15:00	Raphael Rossi Branco 14'; Gladwin 84'; Kasim (yellow card) 90+3'	Report		Stadium: County Ground; Attendance: 8,380; Referee: Gary Sutton

10 February 2015 29	Barnsley	1–2	Fleetwood Town	Barnsley
19:45	Ramage 5' (yellow card) 72'; Hemmings (yellow card) 66'	Report	McLaughlin 14'; Haughton (yellow card) 17'; McAlinden 33'; Mxwell (yellow card) 90+4'	Stadium: Oakwell; Attendance: 8,328; Referee: David Coote

14 February 2015 30	Crawley Town	5–1	Barnsley	Crawley
15:00	McLeod 45+2' 73' 83'; Fowler (yellow card) 45+4'; Bradley 48'; Elliot 59'; Wordsworth (yellow card) 63'	Report	Scowen (yellow card) 52'; Cranie (yellow card) 58'; Hemmings 65'	Stadium: Broadfield Stadium; Attendance: 2,296; Referee: Darren Sheldrake

21 February 2015 31	Barnsley	2–0	Crewe Alexandra	Barnsley
15:00	Nyatanga 66'; Rachubka 79' (o.g.)	Report	Grant (yellow card) 65'; Jones (yellow card) 78'	Stadium: Oakwell; Attendance: 8,635; Referee: Darren Deadman

24 February 2015 32	Scunthorpe United	0–1	Barnsley	Scunthorpe
19:45	Bishop (yellow card) 33'	Report	Mvoto (yellow card) 42' (yellow-red card); Scowen 51'; Pearson (yellow card) 74'	Stadium: Glanford Park; Attendance: 3,508; Referee: Michael Bull

28 February 2015 33	Gillingham	0–1	Barnsley	Gillingham
15:00	Loft (yellow card) 16'	Report	Pearson (yellow card) 45+1'; Waring 56'	Stadium: Priestfield Stadium; Attendance: 5,905; Referee: Kevin Johnson

3 March 2015 34	Barnsley	1–0	Coventry City	Barnsley
19:45	Waring 57' (yellow card) 58'	Report	Martin (yellow card) 41'	Stadium: Oakwell; Attendance: 9,567; Referee: Tony Harrington

7 March 2015 35	Barnsley	3–0	Walsall	Barnsley
15:00	Waring 15' 71'; Winnall 89'	Report	Taylor (yellow card) 86'	Stadium: Oakwell; Attendance: 9,275; Referee: Stuart Attwell

14 March 2015 36	Oldham Athletic	1–3	Barnsley	Oldham
15:00	Lockwood (yellow card) 7' (yellow-red card) 90'; Brown (yellow card) 35'; Jones 42'; Woodland (yellow card) 45'; Wilkinson (yellow card) 90'	Report	Nyatanga 33', 70'; Hourihane 39'; Pearson (yellow card) 74'; Ibehre (yellow card) 88'	Stadium: SportsDirect.com Park; Attendance: 6,344; Referee: Mark Heywood

17 March 2015 37	Leyton Orient	0–0	Barnsley	Leyton
19:45	Wright (yellow card) 56'	Report	Hourihane (yellow card) 27'; Lalkovič (red card) 90'	Stadium: Matchroom Stadium; Attendance: 4,107; Referee: Gavin Ward

21 March 2015 38	Barnsley	1–1	Preston North End	Barnsley
15:00	Cranie (yellow card) 48'; Winnall (yellow card) 55'; Ibehre 79'	Report	Garner 37'; Laird (yellow card) 75'; Gallagher (yellow card) 82'	Stadium: Oakwell; Attendance: 12,471; Referee: Eddie Ilderton

28 March 2015 39	Bristol City	2–2	Barnsley	Bristol
15:00	Pack 13' (pen.); Bryan 84'	Report	Ibehre 44' (yellow card) 74'; Scowen 53'	Stadium: Ashton Gate; Attendance: 11,937; Referee: Mark Brown

4 April 2015 40	Barnsley	0–2	Sheffield United	Barnsley
12:15	Stewart (yellow card) 67'	Report	Davies 42'; Brayford (yellow card) 66'; Holt 71'	Stadium: Oakwell; Attendance: 17,532; Referee: Andy Madley

6 April 2015 41	Colchester United	3–1	Barnsley	Colchester
15:00	Szmodics (yellow card) 13'; Massey (yellow card) 32' (goal) 62'; Murphy 80'; Moncur 86'	Report	Bailey (yellow card) 26'; Waring 40'; Nyatanga (yellow card) 49'; Cranie (yellow card) 87'; Berry (yellow card) 90+2'	Stadium: Colchester Community Stadium; Attendance: 5,157; Referee: Keith Hill

11 April 2015 42	Barnsley	1–1	Chesterfield	Barnsley
15:00	Winnall 62' (yellow card) 78'	Report	O'Shea 26'	Stadium: Oakwell; Attendance: 11,268; Referee: Geoff Eltringham

14 April 2015 43	Notts County	1–1	Barnsley	Nottingham
19:45	Smith (yellow card) 23'; Jones (yellow card) 73'; Bajner 90+2' (yellow card) 90+3'; Thompson (yellow card) 90+5'	Report	Winnall 9'; Ramage (yellow card) 68'; Cranie (yellow card) 72'; Hourihane (yellow card) 74'; Holgate (yellow card) 82'	Stadium: Meadow Lane; Attendance: 4,287; Referee: Graham Salisbury

18 April 2015 44	Barnsley	1–1	Peterborough United	Barnsley
15:00	Hourihane (yellow card) 41'; Berry 90+5'	Report	Ntlhe (yellow card) 15' (yellow-red card); Washington 16'	Stadium: Oakwell; Attendance: 8,924; Referee: Seb Stockbridge

25 April 2015 45	Bradford City	1–0	Barnsley	Bradford
15:00	Stead 17'	Report	Digby (yellow card) 25'	Stadium: Valley Parade; Attendance: 15,560; Referee: Scott Mathieson

3 May 2015 46	Barnsley	5–0	Rochdale	Barnsley
12:15	Scowen (yellow card) 40' (goal) 67' 76'; Holgate 84'; Hourihane 90'; Winnall 90+3'	Report	Rafferty (yellow card) 25' (yellow-red card)	Stadium: Oakwell; Attendance: 9,593; Referee: David Webb

=== FA Cup ===
The draw for the first round of the FA Cup was made on 27 October 2014.

8 November 2014 First round	Barnsley	5–0	Burton Albion	Barnsley
15:00	Winnall 40', 42', 74'; Hourihane 56'; Cole 83'	Report		Stadium: Oakwell; Attendance: 5,158; Referee: David Webb

7 December 2014 Second round	Barnsley	0–0	Chester	Barnsley
14:00		Report		Stadium: Oakwell; Attendance: 7,227; Referee: Darren Handley

16 December 2014 Second round replay	Chester	0–3	Barnsley	Chester
19:45	Kay (yellow card) 47'	Report	Hemmings 16'; Jennings 63', 88'	Stadium: Deva Stadium; Attendance: 3,534; Referee: Keith Hill

3 January 2015 Third round	Barnsley	0–2	Middlesbrough	Barnsley
15:00		Report	Vossen 48'; Clayton (yellow card) 55' (yellow-red card); Daniel Ayala 84'	Stadium: Oakwell; Attendance: 9,473; Referee: Dean Whitestone

=== League Cup ===
12 August 2014 First round	Barnsley	0–2	Crewe Alexandra	Barnsley
19:45		Report	32' Waters; 84' Tootle	Stadium: Oakwell; Attendance: 4,391; Referee: Jeremy Simpson

=== Football League Trophy ===
2 September 2014 First round	Barnsley	2–0	York City	Barnsley
19:45	Cole 63'; Hemmings 80'	Report		Stadium: Oakwell; Attendance: 4,218; Referee: Peter Bankes

7 October 2014 Second round	Oldham Athletic	2–2 (4–2 p)	Barnsley	Oldham
19:45	Poleon 22' (yellow card) 64'; Philliskirk 44'	Report	Berry 53'; Bailey (yellow card) 74'; Winnall 90'	Stadium: Boundary Park; Attendance: 2,502 (534 Barnsley fans); Referee: Gary Sutton
	Penalties
	Philliskirk (penalty scored); Kelly (penalty scored); Jones (penalty scored); Wilkinson (penalty missed); Turner (penalty scored)		Hourihane (penalty scored); Winnall (penalty missed); Hemmings (penalty missed); Abbott (penalty scored)

== Transfers ==
=== In ===
No.	Pos.	Nat.	Name	Age	EU	Moving from	Type	Transfer window	Ends	Transfer fee	Source
12	GK	(England)	Adam Davies	21	EU	Sheffield Wednesday	Bosman	Summer	2016	Free	
10	FW	(England)	Kane Hemmings	22	EU	Cowdenbeath (Scotland)	Bosman	Summer	2015	Free	
8	MF	(Republic of Ireland)	Conor Hourihane	23	EU	Plymouth Argyle	Transfer	Summer	2017	£200,000	
32	MF	(England)	James Bailey	25	EU	Derby County	Bosman	Summer	2016	Free	
9	FW	(England)	Sam Winnall	23	EU	Scunthorpe United	Transfer	Summer	2017	Undisclosed	
1	GK	(England)	Ross Turnbull	29	EU	Doncaster Rovers	Bosman	Summer	2016	Free	
4	MF	(England)	Luke Berry	22	EU	Cambridge United	Transfer	Summer	2017	Undisclosed	
2	DF	(England)	Reece Brown	22	EU	Watford	Bosman	Summer	2015	Undisclosed	
7	MF	(Republic of Ireland)	Keith Treacy	25	EU	Burnley	Bosman	Summer	2016	Free	
33	FW	(England) (Democratic Republic of the Congo)	Leroy Lita	29	EU	Swansea City (Wales)	Bosman	Summer	2015	Free	
—	FW	(England)	Mike Phenix	25	EU	AFC Telford United	Transfer	Winter	2016	Undisclosed	
22	DF	(England)	George Williams	21	EU	Worcester City	Transfer	Winter	2016	Undisclosed	
—	FW	(Slovakia)	Milan Lalkovič	22	EU	Mladá Boleslav (Czech Republic)	Free transfer	Winter	2016	Free	
—	MF	(England)	Josh Scowen	21	EU	Wycombe Wanderers	Transfer	Winter	2017	Undisclosed	

=== Loans in ===
No.	Pos.	Name	Country	Age	Loan club	Started	Ended	Start source	End source
3	DF	Joe Dudgeon	(Northern Ireland)	23	Hull City	31 July 2014	5 January 2015		
44	FW	Devante Cole	(England)	19	Manchester City	19 August 2014	5 January 2015		
13	MF	Ryan Williams	(Australia)	20	Fulham	2 October 2014	30 October 2014		
16	DF	Peter Ramage	(England)	30	Crystal Palace	3 October 2014	3 May 2015		
31	FW	Marcello Trotta	(Italy)	34	Fulham	1 November 2014	5 January 2015		
42	FW	Alex Kiwomya	(England)	18	Chelsea	3 January 2015	3 March 2015		
41	FW	George Waring	(England)	20	Stoke City	8 January 2015	3 February 2015		
36	MF	Ben Pearson	(England)	20	Manchester United	8 January 2015	3 May 2015		
31	MF	John O'Sullivan	(Republic of Ireland)	21	Blackburn Rovers	19 February 2015	23 March 2015		
3	DF	Declan John	(Wales)	19	Cardiff City	6 March 2015	3 May 2015		
21	FW	Jabo Ibehre	(England)	32	Colchester United	6 March 2015	3 May 2015		
19	FW	Cameron Stewart	(England)	23	Ipswich Town	21 March 2015	30 June 2015		
13	GK	Joe Wildsmith	(England)	19	Sheffield Wednesday	26 March 2015	25 April 2015		

Sources: For loan start source see "Start source". For loan end source see "End source".
EU = if holds or not a European Union passport; Country: when 2 flags, 1st flag = country that plays for internationally, 2nd flag = country of birth; No. = number on jersey; P = Position (for position name, pause mouse pointer on abbreviation); Name = Name on jersey (for more extensive name, pause mouse pointer on name); In/Out = In: The player came in on loan, Out: The player went out on loan; Loan club = the club that the player moved on loan to or the club that the player came from on loan; Started = the date when the player's loan started; Ended = the date when the player's loan ended.

=== Out ===
No.	Pos.	Name	Country	Age	Type	Moving to	Transfer window	Transfer fee	Apps	Goals	Source
25	MF	Jordan Clark	(England)	20	Contract Ended	Shrewsbury Town	Summer	Free	6	0	
29	FW	John Cofie	(England)	21	Contract Ended	Molde (Norway)	Summer	Free	0	0	
19	MF	Tomasz Cywka	(Poland)	26	Contract Ended	Blackpool	Summer	Free	48	8	
8	MF	Stephen Dawson	(Republic of Ireland)	28	Contract Ended	Rochdale	Summer	Free	86	6	
23	MF	Kelvin Etuhu	(Nigeria)	25	Contract Ended	Bury	Summer	Free	46	0	
15	MF	Emmanuel Frimpong	(Ghana)	22	Contract Ended	Ufa (Russia)	Summer	Free	9	0	
2	DF	Bobby Hassell	(England)	33	Contract Ended	Bharat FC (India)	Summer	Free	270	8	
18	DF	Andrai Jones	(England)	22	Contract Ended	Gateshead	Summer	Free	2	0	
14	MF	Liam Lawrence	(Republic of Ireland)	32	Contract Ended	Shrewsbury Town	Summer	Free	14	1	
42	MF	Paddy McCourt	(Northern Ireland)	30	Contract Ended	Brighton & Hove Albion	Summer	Free	23	2	
21	MF	Jacob Mellis	(England)	23	Contract Ended	Blackpool	Summer	Free	89	10	
26	MF	Sam Patterson	(England)	20	Contract Ended	Free agent	Summer	Free	0	0	
—	MF	McCauley Shillito	(England)	19	Contract Ended	Free agent	Summer	Free	0	0	
—	MF	Erico Sousa	(Portugal)	19	Contract Ended	Free agent	Summer	Free	0	0	
—	DF	Jordan Tunnicliffe	(England)	20	Contract Ended	Kidderminster Harriers	Summer	Free	0	0	
31	GK	Iain Turner	(Scotland)	30	Contract Ended	Sheffield United	Summer	Free	0	0	
11	MF	Martin Woods	(Scotland)	28	Contract Ended	Ross County (Scotland)	Summer	Free	8	0	
7	MF	Jim O'Brien	(Republic of Ireland)	26	Contract Ended	Coventry City	Summer	Free	133	8	
1	GK	Luke Steele	(England)	29	Free transfer	Panathinaikos (Greece)	Summer	Free	209	0	
10	FW	Chris O'Grady	(England)	28	Transfer	Brighton & Hove Albion	Summer	Undisclosed	59	21	
4	DF	Tom Kennedy	(England)	29	Contract Terminated	Rochdale	Summer	Free	75	1	
16	FW	Danny Rose	(England)	20	Transfer	Bury	Summer	Undisclosed	16	1	
19	FW	Reuben Noble-Lazarus	(England)	21	Transfer	Rochdale	Winter	Undisclosed	46	3	
7	MF	Keith Treacy	(Republic of Ireland)	26	Released	Free agent	Winter	Free	10	1	
2	DF	Reece Brown	(England)	23	Released	Free agent	Winter	Free	13	0	

EU = if holds or not a European Union passport; Country: when 2 flags, 1st flag = country that plays for internationally, 2nd flag = country of birth; N = number on jersey; P = Position (for position name, pause mouse pointer on abbreviation); Name = Name on jersey (for more extensive name, pause mouse pointer on name); Age = age on the day of the signing; Moving from = only indicate the club the player was playing before start playing for this club in this season, for the type of the moving see Status column; Moving to = only indicates the club the player is going to play next, for the type of the moving see Status column; Ends = when the player's current contract ends; n/a = Not applicable; Apps = Total number of competitive appearances (including substitute appearances) at the club prior to departure; Goals = Total number of competitive goals scored at the club prior to departure.

=== Loans out ===
No.	Pos.	Name	Country	Age	Loan club	Started	Ended	Start source	End source
16	FW	Danny Rose	(England)	20	Bury	15 August 2014	18 August 2014		
18	FW	Rhys Oates	(England)	32	Grimsby Town	19 September 2014			
19	FW	Reuben Noble-Lazarus	(England)	33	Rochdale	27 October 2014	13 January 2015		
24	GK	Christian Dibble	(Wales)	20	Nuneaton Town	27 November 2014	17 January 2015		
20	DF	George Smith	(England)	18	Bradford Park Avenue	27 November 2014	27 January 2015		
17	MF	Brad Abbott	(England)	20	Chester	16 January 2015	13 February 2015		
26	FW	George Maris	(England)	18	Nuneaton Town	30 January 2015	2 March 2015		
33	FW	Leroy Lita	(England)	30	Notts County	3 March 2015	30 June 2015		

Sources: For loan start source see "Start source". For loan end source see "End source".
EU = if holds or not a European Union passport; Country: when 2 flags, 1st flag = country that plays for internationally, 2nd flag = country of birth; No. = number on jersey; P = Position (for position name, pause mouse pointer on abbreviation); Name = Name on jersey (for more extensive name, pause mouse pointer on name); In/Out = In: The player came in on loan, Out: The player went out on loan; Loan club = the club that the player moved on loan to or the club that the player came from on loan; Started = the date when the player's loan started; Ended = the date when the player's loan ended.
