= George Waring (footballer) =

English footballer

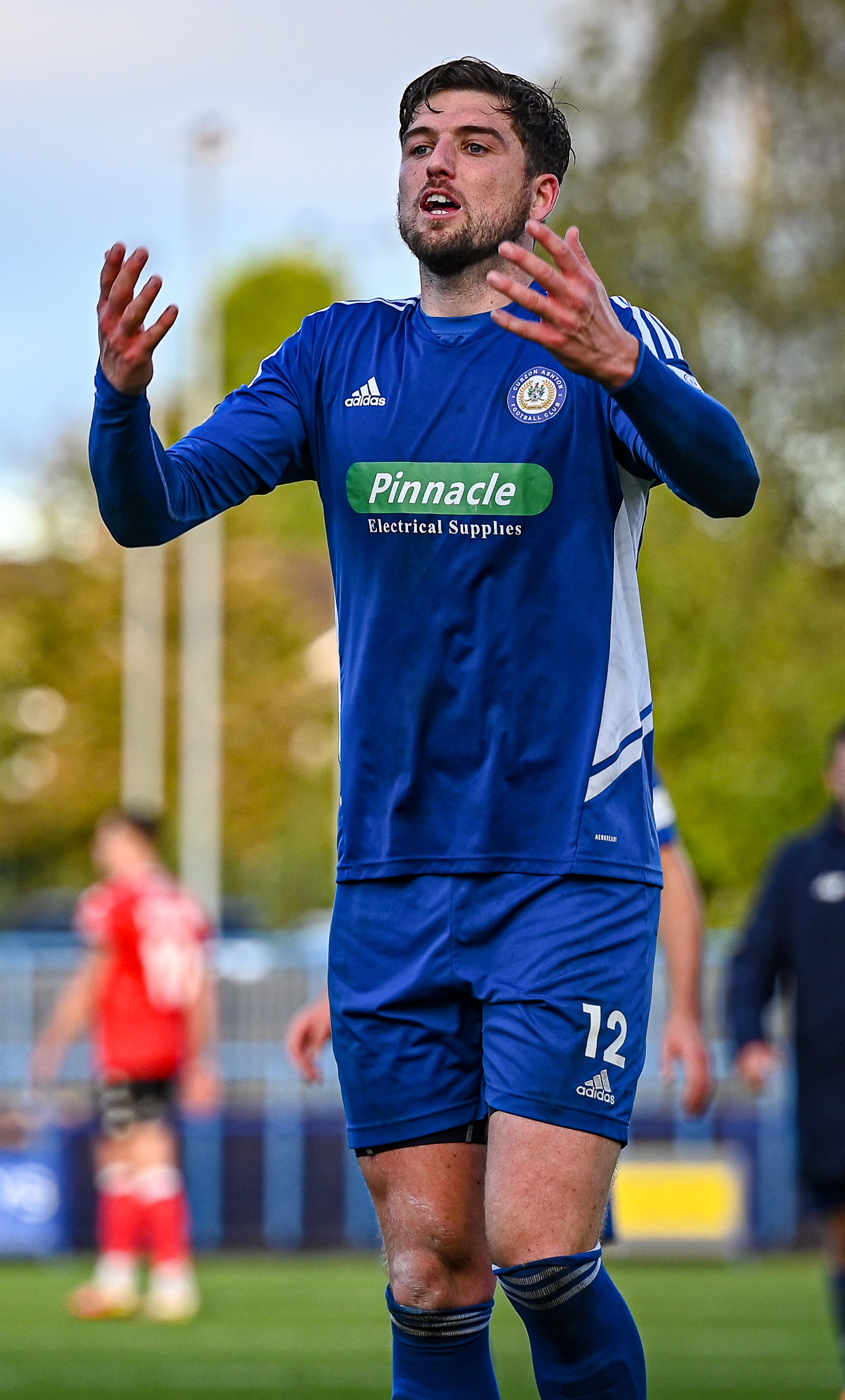
- George Waring, Playing for Curzon Ashton, in 2023

Personal information
- Full name: George Philip Waring
- Date of birth: 2 December 1994 (age 31)
- Place of birth: Kingsley, England
- Height: 6 ft 5 in (1.96 m)
- Position: Forward

Team information
- Current team: Warrington Rylands

Youth career
- 2011–2013: Everton
- 2013–2014: Stoke City

Senior career*
| Years | Team | Apps | (Gls) |
| 2015–2017 | Stoke City | 0 | (0) |
| 2015 | → Barnsley (loan) | 19 | (6) |
| 2016 | → Oxford United (loan) | 14 | (1) |
| 2016–2017 | → Shrewsbury Town (loan) | 13 | (0) |
| 2017 | → Carlisle United (loan) | 9 | (0) |
| 2017–2019 | Tranmere Rovers | 3 | (0) |
| 2017–2018 | → FC Halifax Town (loan) | 10 | (2) |
| 2018 | → Kidderminster Harriers (loan) | 14 | (4) |
| 2018–2019 | → Kidderminster Harriers (loan) | 6 | (0) |
| 2019–2022 | Chester | 78 | (13) |
| 2022–2024 | Curzon Ashton | 85 | (5) |
| 2024 | → Warrington Rylands (loan) | 4 | (0) |
| 2024– | Warrington Rylands | 24 | (6) |
- * Club domestic league appearances and goals as of 15:57, 3 September 2025 (UTC)

George Philip Waring (born 2 December 1994) is an English footballer who plays as a forward for Warrington Rylands.

== Career ==
=== Stoke City ===
Waring was born in Chester and began his career at his local club Chester City before joining Everton at the age of 14. At the age of 16 he scored the winning goal for Everton U18s in the final of the U18s Premier League Cup. He signed for Stoke City in April 2013. Waring began the 2013–14 season with the U21s and scored four goals against West Bromwich Albion on 5 September 2013. However, he missed the rest of the campaign due to injury, returning in June 2014 to play in the Altstatten International Tournament.

On 8 January 2015, Waring joined League One side Barnsley on a one-month loan. He made his professional debut on 10 January 2015 against Yeovil Town, scoring his first professional goal in a 2–0 victory. On 2 February 2015, after an impressive initial loan spell, Waring's loan at Barnsley was extended until the end of the 2014–15 season. Waring had a successful spell with the Tykes, scoring six times in 19 appearances as the team finished in 11th position.

Waring joined League Two side Oxford United on a month's loan in February 2016. Waring remained with Oxford for the remainder of their promotion winning 2015–16 season making a total of 15 appearances scoring once.

On 15 August 2016, Waring joined Shrewsbury Town on a six-month loan along with Stoke teammate Moha El Ouriachi. Waring made 18 appearances for the Shrews but failed to hit the back of the net.

On 31 January 2017 Waring joined Carlisle United on loan until the end of the 2016–17 season. Waring played ten times for Carlisle helping the club reach the play-offs where they lost to Exeter City. He was released by Stoke at the end of the 2016–17 season.

=== Tranmere Rovers ===
Following his release by Stoke, Waring signed a two-year contract with National League side Tranmere Rovers.

In October 2017, he joined FC Halifax Town on loan, a spell that was then extended until January 2018.

In January 2018, he joined Kidderminster Harriers on loan.

On 7 July 2018, he scored a goal for Grimsby Town in a friendly against Cleethorpes Town whilst on trial. Grimsby manager Michael Jolley announced a couple of days later that Grimsby would not be pursuing an interest in Waring.

In November 2018, he rejoined Kidderminster Harriers on loan.

=== Chester ===
In January 2019, he joined Chester.

=== Later career ===
In the summer of 2022, he transferred to fellow National League North divisional rivals Curzon Ashton.

He signed a new contract for the 23–24 season with Curzon Ashton in May 2023.

On 19 October 2024, Waring joined Northern Premier League Premier Division club Warrington Rylands on loan, and on 20 November joined the club permanently for an undisclosed fee, having impressed on loan.

On 30 April 2025, it was announced that Waring had agreed terms to remain at Warrington Rylands for the following season.

== Career statistics ==
As of match played 8 April 2024

Appearances and goals by club, season and competition
| Club | Season | League | | | FA Cup | | League Cup | | Other | | Total | |
| Club | Season | Division | Apps | Goals | Apps | Goals | Apps | Goals | Apps | Goals | Apps | Goals |
|---|---|---|---|---|---|---|---|---|---|---|---|---|
| Stoke City | 2014–15 | Premier League | 0 | 0 | 0 | 0 | 0 | 0 | 0 | 0 | 0 | 0 |
| Stoke City | 2015–16 | Premier League | 0 | 0 | 0 | 0 | 0 | 0 | 0 | 0 | 0 | 0 |
| Stoke City | 2016–17 | Premier League | 0 | 0 | 0 | 0 | 0 | 0 | 0 | 0 | 0 | 0 |
| Stoke City | Total | | 0 | 0 | 0 | 0 | 0 | 0 | 0 | 0 | 0 | 0 |
| Barnsley (loan) | 2014–15 | League One | 19 | 6 | 0 | 0 | 0 | 0 | 0 | 0 | 19 | 6 |
| Oxford United (loan) | 2015–16 | League Two | 14 | 1 | 0 | 0 | 0 | 0 | 1 (Note: Appearance(s) in the Football League Trophy) | 0 | 15 | 1 |
| Shrewsbury Town (loan) | 2016–17 | League One | 13 | 0 | 2 | 0 | 1 | 0 | 2 | 0 | 18 | 0 |
| Carlisle United (loan) | 2016–17 | League Two | 9 | 0 | — | | — | | 1 (Note: Appearance(s) in League Two play-offs) | 0 | 10 | 0 |
| Tranmere Rovers | 2017–18 | National League | 3 | 0 | 0 | 0 | — | | 0 | 0 | 3 | 0 |
| FC Halifax Town (loan) | 2017–18 | National League | 10 | 2 | 0 | 0 | — | | 0 | 0 | 10 | 2 |
| Kidderminster Harriers (loan) | 2017–18 | National League North | 14 | 4 | 0 | 0 | — | | 1 (Note: Appearance(s) in National League North play-offs) | 0 | 15 | 4 |
| Kidderminster Harriers (loan) | 2018–19 | National League North | 6 | 0 | 0 | 0 | — | | 0 | 0 | 6 | 0 |
| Kidderminster Harriers (loan) | Total | | 20 | 4 | 0 | 0 | — | | 1 | 0 | 21 | 4 |
| Chester | 2018–19 | National League North | 15 | 5 | 0 | 0 | — | | 0 | 0 | 15 | 5 |
| Chester | 2019–20 | National League North | 24 | 4 | 2 | 0 | — | | 6 (Note: Three appearances in FA Trophy, two appearances and two goals in Cheshire Senior Cup, one appearance in National League North play-offs) | 2 | 32 | 6 |
| Chester | 2020–21 | National League North | 17 | 0 | 3 | 1 | — | | 2 (Note: Appearance(s) in the FA Trophy) | 1 | 22 | 2 |
| Chester | 2021–22 | National League North | 22 | 4 | 4 | 0 | — | | 1 | 0 | 27 | 4 |
| Chester | Total | | 78 | 13 | 9 | 1 | — | | 8 | 3 | 96 | 17 |
| Curzon Ashton | 2022–23 | National League North | 39 | 2 | 5 | 0 | — | | 1 | 0 | 45 | 2 |
| Curzon Ashton | 2023–24 | National League North | 41 | 3 | 4 | 0 | — | | 2 (Note: One appearance in FA Trophy, one appearance in Manchester Premier Cup) | 0 | 47 | 3 |
| Curzon Ashton | 2024–25 | National League North | 5 | 0 | 0 | 0 | — | | 0 | 0 | 5 | 0 |
| Curzon Ashton | Total | | 85 | 5 | 9 | 0 | — | | 3 | 0 | 96 | 5 |
| Warrington Rylands (loan) | 2024–25 | Northern Premier League Premier Division | 4 | 0 | 0 | 0 | — | | 2 | 2 | 6 | 2 |
| Warrington Rylands | 2024–25 | Northern Premier League Premier Division | 22 | 6 | 0 | 0 | — | | 1 | 2 | 23 | 8 |
| Warrington Rylands | 2025–26 | Northern Premier League Premier Division | 2 | 0 | 0 | 0 | — | | 0 | 0 | 2 | 0 |
| Warrington Rylands | Total | | 28 | 6 | 0 | 0 | 0 | 0 | 3 | 4 | 31 | 10 |
| Career total | | | 279 | 37 | 20 | 1 | 1 | 0 | 19 | 7 | 319 | 45 |

== Honours ==
Oxford United

- Football League Trophy runner-up: 2015–16
