= Dominic McHale =

English footballer (born 1996)

Personal information
- Full name: Dominic Michael McHale
- Date of birth: 18 February 1996 (age 30)
- Place of birth: Manchester, England
- Height: 5 ft 11 in (1.81 m)
- Position: Midfielder

Team information
- Current team: Chester

Youth career
- –2014: Manchester City

Senior career*
Years	Team	Apps	(Gls)
2014–2015	Barnsley	0	(0)
- → Northwich Flixton Villa (dual reg)
2015	Ramsbottom United	6	(0)
2015	Northwich Victoria		
- Northwich Manchester Villa
2017	Achyronas Liopetriou	10	(3)
2017–2018	Salford City	3	(0)
2018	→ Trafford (loan)		
2018	→ Hyde United (loan)	6	(0)
2018	Southport	0	(0)
2018–2019	Ashton United	8	(1)
2019	FC United of Manchester	4	(1)
2019	Oldham Athletic	1	(0)
2019–2020	Romford	2	(1)
2020	South Shields	3	(1)
2020	Ashton United	2	(0)
2020–2022	AFC Telford United	34	(6)
2022	→ Darlington (loan)	2	(0)
2022	Radcliffe	3	(1)
2022	→ Matlock Town (loan)	5	(0)
2022	→ Gloucester City (loan)	7	(2)
2022–2023	Gloucester City	21	(10)
2023–2024	Brackley Town	18	(0)
2024	Scarborough Athletic	14	(0)
2024	→ Hereford (loan)	3	(0)
2024–2026	Hednesford Town	31	(10)
2026-	Chester	5	(1)
- * Club domestic league appearances and goals as of 10:00 18 November 2026 (UTC)

Dominic Michael McHale (born 18 February 1996) is an English professional footballer who plays as a midfielder for National League North club Chester FC.

== Playing career ==
McHale came through the Manchester City Academy before joining Barnsley on an 18-month contract in February 2014 after leaving City by mutual consent.

He joined Northwich Flixton Villa for a spell during the 2014–15 festive season.

He then joined Ramsbottom United in July 2015, having been released by Barnsley. The following month he was sent off for his part in a mass 22-man fight in a match against Buxton. In November he signed for Northwich Victoria, before moving to Northwich Manchester Villa during the 2015–16 festive period.

At the beginning of the 2016–17 season he appeared at least once for AFC Fylde's reserve team. He also played for Achyronas Liopetriou during the 2016–17 Cypriot Third Division season.

After playing on trial for Salford City he signed for the club in August 2017 and made his debut as a late substitute in a league match against Stockport County on 15 August. In February 2018 he joined Trafford on loan, before the following month moving, again on loan, to Hyde United, for whom he played six league matches.

After leaving Salford he joined Ashton United in August 2018. In March 2019 he joined FC United of Manchester, and left the following month.

On 30 August 2019 he joined League Two team Oldham Athletic having trained with them over the summer period. He made one brief appearance in the Football League, as a very late substitute in a 2–2 draw away to Plymouth Argyle on 7 September, and after three months, his contract was terminated by mutual consent. He joined Romford, but left again in January 2020.

In March 2020 he rejoined Ashton United, and later that year signed for National League North club AFC Telford United. On 25 March 2022, McHale joined another National League North club, Darlington, on loan for the remainder of the 2021–22 season, at the end of which he was released by his parent club.

McHale signed for Radcliffe of the Northern Premier League Premier Division ahead of the 2022–23 season, and played three times before signing on loan for divisional rivals Matlock Town in September 2022. After a month, during which he made five league appearances, McHale returned to the National League North on a one-month loan at Gloucester City. He scored twice on debut as his new side beat Farsley Celtic 5–1. On 25 November 2022, McHale terminated his contract at Radcliffe by mutual consent, signing permanently for Gloucester City the following day on a deal until the end of the season. Four goals and four assists during January 2023 earned him the National League North Player of the Month award, and he finished the season with 12 goals from 28 league matches.

McHale joined another National North club, Brackley Town, ahead of the 2023–24 season. He made 18 league appearances without scoring before his contract was terminated by mutual consent on 5 January 2024. His tour of that division continued the same day, first with Scarborough Athletic and then, after 14 league matches without scoring, with Hereford, which he joined on 22 March on loan until the end of the season.

McHale joined Northern Premier League Division One West club Hednesford Town on 1 June 2024.

McHale joined National League North Club Chester on 4 June 2026 on a one year deal. He made his debut coming on as a substitute in a 4-1 home victory against Worksop. He scored his first goal for the club in a 5-0 away victory over Spennymoor Town.

== Statistics ==
Appearances and goals by club, season and competition
Season	Club	League			FA Cup		League cup		Other		Total	
Season	Club	Division	Apps	Goals	Apps	Goals	Apps	Goals	Apps	Goals	Apps	Goals
2014–15	Barnsley	League One	0	0	0	0	1	0	0	0	1	0
Total			0	0	0	0	1	0	0	0	1	0

== Honours ==
Hednesford Town

- Northern Premier League Division One West play-offs: 2025
