= Afia Amankwaah Tamakloe =

Ghanaian TV and radio personality, journalist

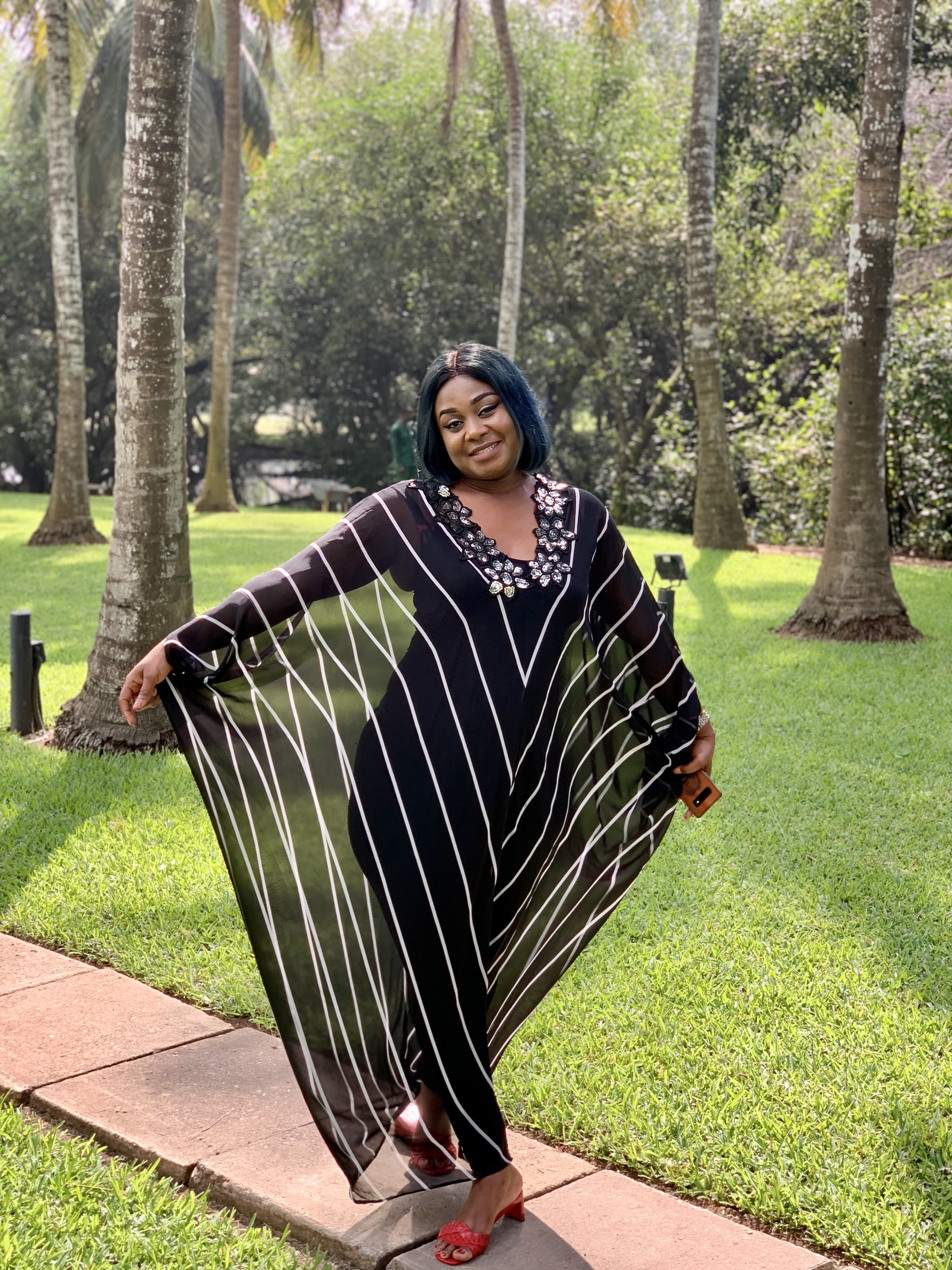
- A picture of Afia Amankwaah Tamakloe at the Labadi beach
- Born: Ophelia Ofori Amankwaah
- Education: Konongo Odumase Senior High School, Institute of Business Management and Journalism, African University College of Communications
- Alma mater: African University College of Communications
- Occupations: Television and radio personality, journalist
- Spouse: Larry Tamakloe

Ophelia Ofori Amankwaah known widely as Afia Amankwaah Tamakloe is a Ghanaian TV and radio personality, journalist and a health advocate. She was adjourned the Best Health Reporter at the 25th GJA Awards. She is the host of Nkwa Hia, Nyinsen Ne Awo and M'ahyɛaseɛ on Adom FM/TV.

== Awards and nominations ==
Year	Ceremony	Award	Nominated work	Results	Ref
2020	25th GJA Awards	Best Health Reporting	Herself	Won	
2020	Ghana Outstanding Women Awards	Outstanding Woman of the Year (Health)	Herself	Nominated	
2020	NCA Awards	TV Newscaster of the Year (Local)	Herself	Won	
2019	Media Excellence Awards (USA)		Herself	Won	
2019	Ghana Actors and Entertainers Awards	Best Female News Anchor	Herself	Won	
2019	Ghana Actors and Entertainers Awards	Best TV Hostess	Herself	Won	
2019	Ghana Outstanding Women Awards	Outstanding Woman of the Year (Radio)	Herself	Nominated	

== Personal life ==
She is married to Mr. Larry Tamakloe and they both have two kids, Laureen and Kurt.
