= Papa Arko =

Ghanaian footballer (died 2023)

Personal information
- Date of death: 26 November 2023
- Position: Forward

Senior career*
Years	Team	Apps	(Gls)
- Asante Kotoko

International career
- Ghana
Medal record
1983 African Cup of Champions Clubs
- * Club domestic league appearances and goals

Ernest Papa Arko (died 26 November 2023) was a Ghanaian footballer. He played as a forward for Asante Kotoko and the Ghana national team.

== Education ==
Arko attended the Konongo Odumase Senior High School where he was the captain of the football team.

== Club football ==
Arko played for Asante Kotoko in the late 1970s and early 1980s, and was the captain of the team. They went on to be finalists in the 1982 African Cup of Champions Clubs competition where they lost to Al Ahly SC of Egypt. He continued to lead the team in 1983, the year they last won the 1983 CAF Champions League. He is often listed among the club legends.

== International career ==
Arko played in the 1980 African Cup of Nations where the Ghana national team failed to defend its title. He was also in the team that played in the 1984 African Nations Cup tournament.

== Death ==
Arko died on 26 November 2023.

== Honours ==
- African Cup of Champions Clubs: 1983
