= Bobby Moseley =

Irish footballer (born 1996)

Personal information
- Date of birth: 7 March 1996 (age 30)
- Place of birth: Birmingham, England
- Height: 5 ft 10 in (1.78 m)
- Positions: Left back; midfielder

Youth career
- 2010–2012: Coventry City
- 2012–2014: Birmingham City

Senior career*
Years	Team	Apps	(Gls)
2015–2016	Stoke City	0	(0)
2016	→ San Antonio FC (loan)	11	(0)
2016	Solihull Moors	2	(0)
2016–2017	Southport	5	(0)
2017	Gloucester City	5	(0)

International career
	Republic of Ireland U16	4	(0)
	Republic of Ireland U17	8	(0)
	Republic of Ireland U19	13	(0)
- * Club domestic league appearances and goals as of 07:55, 5 October 2016 (UTC)

Bobby Moseley (born 7 March 1996) is an Irish footballer who is retired and now owner of football agency Complete Sports Group.

== Career ==
Moseley began his career playing in the youth teams at Coventry City and then Birmingham City. In July 2015, Moseley joined Stoke City and played in a pre-season friendly against Porto on 2 August 2015. In March 2016, Moseley joined United Soccer League side San Antonio FC on loan. He was released by Stoke at the end of the 2015–16 season.

In July 2016, Moseley signed for National League side Solihull Moors. His stay at Solihull was brief as he joined Southport on a short-term contract on 12 September 2016. He joined Gloucester City on 4 February 2017.

== International career ==
Moseley has featured in 25 matches at Republic Of Ireland youth level. Appearing in both the U17 and U19 UEFA European Championships.
