= Kwabena Sarfo =

Ghanaian politician

Hon. Kwabena Sarfo

Member of Parliament for Offinso South Constituency
- In office 7 January 2005 – 6 January 2009
- President: John Kufuor

Personal details
- Born: 29 July 1947 (age 79)
- Party: New Patriotic Party
- Education: Kwame Nkrumah University of Science and Technology
- Profession: Teacher

Kwabena Sarfo (born 29 July 1947) is a Ghanaian politician. He represents the Offinso South constituency as a Member of the 4th Parliament of the 4th republic of Ghana in the Ashanti Region.

== Early life and education ==
Sarfo was born in Offinso, a suburb in the Ashanti region. He is a product of the Kwame Nkrumah University of Science and Technology. He obtained a Bachelor of Science degree in Planning from the university.

== Career ==
Sarfo is a teacher by profession.

== Politics ==
Sarfo was first elected into parliament after he was pronounced winner of the 2000 Ghanaian General Elections and was sworn in on 7 January 2001.After completion of his first tenure in office, He was the reelected after the completion of the 2004 Ghanaian General Elections on the ticket of the New Patriotic Party (NPP). He resumed office in January 2005. He was a member of parliament to the Offinso South constituency.

== Elections ==
Sarfo was elected as the member of parliament for the Offinso South constituency of the Ashanti Region of Ghana for the first time in the 2004 Ghanaian general elections. He won on the ticket of the New Patriotic Party. His constituency was a part of the 36 parliamentary seats out of 39 seats won by the New Patriotic Party in that election for the Ashanti Region. The New Patriotic Party won a majority total of 128 parliamentary seats out of 230 seats. He was elected with 19,694 votes out of 37,946 total valid votes cast. This was equivalent to 51.9% of total valid votes cast. He was elected over Adusei-Poku Daniel of the People's National Convention, Asamoah Serwaa Baabara of the National Democratic Congress, Desmond Osei Kwame of the Convention People's Party, Nsiah-Boateng Faibil of the Every Ghanaian Living Everywhere party and Joseph Akwasi-Kumah an independent candidate. These obtained 202, 11,637, 148, 95 and 6,170 votes respectively of total valid votes cast. These were equivalent to 0.5%, 30.7%, 0.4%, 0.3% and 16.3% respectively of total valid votes cast.

== Personal life ==
Sarfo is a Christian.

== See also ==
- List of MPs elected in the 2004 Ghanaian parliamentary election
