= Health Advocate =

American business (2001-)

- Company type: Private
- Industry: Health care
- Founded: 2001
- Founder: Michael Cardillo; Arthur "Abbie" Leibowitz, M.D. Thomas Masci, Jr. David Rocchino; Martin Rosen
- Headquarters: Plymouth Meeting, Pennsylvania, United States
- Services: Health advocacy
- Number of employees: 640
- Website: www.healthadvocate.com

Health Advocate, Inc. is a US national health advocacy, patient advocacy and assistance company. The privately held company was founded in 2001 by former Aetna executives and is headquartered in Plymouth Meeting, Pennsylvania, currently run by Teleperformance. The company employs registered nurses, medical directors and benefits specialists who address a range of health care and health insurance issues. Personal Health Advocates can help members locate providers, address errors on medical bills, answer questions about coverage denials and assist with insurance appeals.

The company's products include brands called Wellness Advocate, Benefits Gateway+Health Information Dashboards, EAP and Worklife, Pricing Decision Support, Personalized Health Communications, Chronic Care Management, and HR. The company offers a direct-to-consumer advocacy service, called Health Proponent to individuals who are not part of groups.

== Products and services ==
Core advocacy

- Clinical Assistance – medical and pharmaceutical advice and research.

Clinical Assistance helps members understand tests, treatments, and medications recommended or prescribed by physicians, facilitating the transfer of medical records, X-rays, and lab results before a scheduled appointment with a new physician, arranging for home-care equipment after discharge from a hospital, facilitating review of test results with another physician for confirmation of diagnosis, consolidating a multiple-day testing schedule for members with special needs, arranging hospice and other services for the terminally ill, facilitating transfer from a community hospital to a tertiary care facility.

- Administrative Assistance helps resolve claims and benefits issues and helps find assistance outside the health plan.

== Coverage ==
Employers generally offer the service to their employees as a benefit and extension to their healthcare insurance plans. The employee's immediate family is also covered. This includes spouses, dependent children, parents, and parents-in-law.

Those whose employers do not offer the service can purchase it from Health Advocate's direct-to-consumer arm Health Proponent.

== Published works ==
- Rosen, Martin B. & Leibowitz, Abbie. “Health Advocacy Programs Help Employers and Employees Navigate Health Care and Insurance Systems.” Employee Benefit Plan Review Volume 57, Number 4, October 2002
- Rosen, Martin B. & Leibowitz, Abbie. “Health Advocacy Helps Employers and Employees Cope with Health Care and Insurance Systems.” HIU Health Insurance Underwriter November 2002
- Leibowitz, M.D., Abbie. “What Do Patient Advocates Do?” National Underwriter Vol. 3, No. 2, December 2003
- Cardillo, Michael & Rosen, Martin. “Benefits, Challenges of Consumer-Driven Healthcare.” Human Capital January/ February 2004
- Rosen, Martin B. & Leibowitz, M.D., Abbie. “Health Advocacy Helps Employers and Employees Cope with Healthcare and Insurance Systems.” Philadelphia SHRM Chapter News February 2004
- Rosen, Martin B. & Leibowitz, M.D., Abbie. “Health Advocacy: Saving Time and Money for Employers and Employees.” Employee Benefits August 2004
- Leibowitz, M.D., Abbie. “Health advocacy: Strategic complement to consumer-directed Healthcare.” Inside HR/NY September 2004
- Leibowitz, M.D., F.A.A.P., Abbie. “The Role of Health Advocacy in Disease Management.” Disease Management Volume 8, Number 3 2005
- Rosen, Martin. “Health Advocacy: A New resource for Employers.” Pension & Benefits Update Vol. 16, No. 3, March/ April 2005
- Rosen, Martin B. “Health Advocacy: Saving Time and Money for Employers and Employees.” The Healthcare Savings Chronicle Volume 3 August 2005
- Martin B. Rosen and Arthur “Abbie” Leibowitz, M.D. coauthored The Healthcare Survival Guide: Cost-Saving Options for the Suddenly Unemployed
- Rosen, Martin B. “Simple Ways to Organize Your Older Relatives.” Buttoned Up 6 January 2010
- Rosen, Martin B. “Top 10 Ways to manage Eldercare.” S.I. Parent March 2010
- Chiaro MSW, LSW, Michelle. "The Role of Social Work in Health Advocacy." Social Work Today Newsletter August 2010

== See also ==
- Health Insurance Innovations
- Health insurance
