= Amankwah =

Amankwah is a surname. Notable people with the surname include:

- Alex Amankwah (born 1992), Ghanaian middle-distance runner
- Frank Amankwah (born 1971), Ghanaian footballer
- Yaw Amankwah Mireku (born 1979), Ghanaian footballer
- Yaw Ihle Amankwah (born 1988), Norwegian footballer
