= Nana Boakye-Yiadom (journalist) =

Ghanaian communications professional (born 1983)

Nana Boakye-Yiadom is a Ghanaian communications and public relations strategist and journalist.

He is a former Deputy Director of News Programming at the station. Boakye-Yiadom was also the Ghana correspondent for The New York Times, Radio France Internationale (RFI English Service) and Agence France-Presse (AFP), and freelanced for other international and pan-African media organizations.

== Awards ==
- Africa Story Challenge 2014 (Agricultural Cycle)
- Ghana Journalist Association (GJA) Best Online Story 2013
- Young African Leaders Initiative 2016 Fellow
