= Nana Boakye-Yiadom (footballer) =

English footballer (born 1996)

Personal information
- Full name: Nana Emeka Boakye-Yiadom
- Date of birth: 13 May 1996 (age 30)
- Place of birth: Hackney, England
- Position: Forward

Youth career
- –2013: West Ham United
- 2013–2014: Barnsley

Senior career*
Years	Team	Apps	(Gls)
2014–2015	Barnsley	1	(0)
2016–2017	Leatherhead	16	(5)
2017	→ Waltham Forest (dual reg.)	2	(2)
2017	Waltham Forest	1	(1)
2017–2018	Dulwich Hamlet	30	(3)
2018	→ Leatherhead (loan)	9	(3)
2018	Concord Rangers	6	(0)
2018–2019	AFC Hornchurch	10	(0)
2019	Barking	26	(8)
2020	Clapton	6	(3)
- * Club domestic league appearances and goals as of 15:00, 2 July 2023 (UTC)

Nana Emeka Boakye-Yiadom (born 13 May 1996) is an English footballer who last played for Clapton.

== Club career ==
Boakye-Yiadom began his career with the West Ham United academy before appearing on trial at Barnsley's under-18's. Boakye-Yiadom signed a professional contract with Barnsley in May 2014. He made his Football League debut on 9 August 2014 in 78th minute of a 1–0 home defeat to Crawley Town, almost scoring when he glanced a header wide in stoppage time.

After making four appearances, Boakye-Yiadom was among seven players released by the club.

After a year without a club, Boakye-Yiadom joined Isthmian League Premier Division side Leatherhead in December 2016. On 1 January 2017, Boakye-Yiadom made his Leatherhead debut in 0–0 draw with Merstham, replacing Richard Seixas in the 54th minute. On 29 April 2017, Boakye-Yiadom scored twice for Waltham Forest in a 3–2 victory against Southend Manor.

Boakye-Yiadom rejoined Waltham Forest for the start of the 2017–18 season, scoring in their opening day Essex Senior League draw at Hullbridge Sports, before moving to Dulwich Hamlet for the start of the Isthmian League Premier season, scoring his first goals for the club with a hat-trick against Hastings United in a 3–1 FA Cup 1st Qualifying Round win on 2 September 2017.

On 31 March 2018, Boakye-Yiadom returned to Leatherhead on a loan deal until the end of the campaign.

On 11 May 2018, Boakye-Yiadom joined National League South side Concord Rangers on a one-year deal, reuniting with former manager, Sammy Moore. In September 2018, Boakye-Yiadom signed for AFC Hornchurch. In February 2019, after making 16 appearances for Hornchurch in all competitions, scoring three times, Boakye-Yiadom signed for Barking. In January 2020, Boakye-Yiadom joined Clapton.

== Personal life ==
Boakye-Yiadom was born in England and is of Ghanaian descent.

== Career statistics ==
As of match played 1 September 2018.

Club	Season	League			FA Cup		League Cup		Other		Total	
Club	Season	Division	Apps	Goals	Apps	Goals	Apps	Goals	Apps	Goals	Apps	Goals
Barnsley	2013–14	Championship	0	0	0	0	0	0	—		0	0
Barnsley	2014–15	League One	1	0	2	0	1	0	0	0	4	0
Barnsley	Total		1	0	2	0	1	0	0	0	4	0
Leatherhead	2016–17	Isthmian League Premier Division	16	5	—		—		0	0	16	5
Waltham Forest (dual reg.)	2016–17	Essex Senior League	2	2	—		—		0	0	2	2
Waltham Forest	2017–18	Essex Senior League	1	1	—		—		—		1	1
Dulwich Hamlet	2017–18	Isthmian League Premier Division	30	3	2	3	—		8 (Note: Four appearances and one goal in Isthmian League Cup, two appearances in FA Trophy, two appearances in London Senior Cup)	1	40	7
Leatherhead (loan)	2017–18	Isthmian League Premier Division	9	3	—		—		—		9	3
Concord Rangers	2018–19	National League South	6	0	0	0	—		0	0	6	0
Career total			70	14	4	3	1	0	6	1	81	18
