= Offinso South (Ghana parliament constituency) =

Constituency in the Ashanti Region of Ghana

- constituency for the Parliament of Ghana
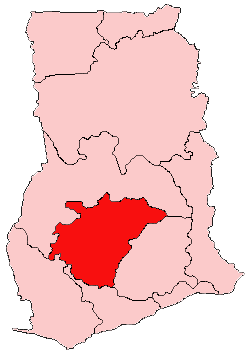
- District: Offinso District
- Region: Ashanti Region of Ghana

Current constituency
- Party: New Patriotic Party
- MP: Isaac Yaw Opoku

Offinso South is one of the constituencies represented in the Parliament of Ghana. It elects one Member of Parliament (MP) by the first past the post system of election. Offinso South is located in the Offinso district of the Ashanti Region of Ghana.

== Boundaries ==
The seat is located within the Offinso district of the Ashanti Region of Ghana.

== Members of Parliament ==
Election	Member	Party
1992	Oheneba Kofi Asamoah	Every Ghanaian Living Everywhere
1996	Francis Kwasi Buor	New Patriotic Party
2000	Kwabena Sarfo	New Patriotic Party
2007	Owusu Achaw Duah	New Patriotic Party
2008	Ben Abdallah Banda	New Patriotic Party

== Elections ==
2008 Ghanaian parliamentary election: Offinso South Source:Ghana Home Page
Party	Candidate	Votes	%	±%
New Patriotic Party	Ben Abdallah Banda	24,898	51.9	−13.6
National Democratic Congress	Barbara Serwah Asamoah	12,898	33.9	0.2
Democratic Freedom Party	Akwasi Owusu-Ansah	103	0.3	—
Convention People's Party	Kwaku Owusu Afriyie	87	0.2	—
Reformed Patriotic Democrats	Michael Kotey	63	0.2	—
Majority		12,000	21.2	18.0

At the by-election held on 24 October 2006, the New Patriotic Party (NPP) candidate, Owusu Achaw Duah, won the seat with a majority of 10,097.

Offinso South by-election, 2007 Source:Ghana Home Page
Party	Candidate	Votes	%	±%
New Patriotic Party	Owusu Achaw Duah	20,763	65.5	+13.6
National Democratic Congress	Barbara Serwa Asamoah	10,666	33.7	+3.0
Independent	Emmanuel Kwasi Addai	177	0.6	N/A
Democratic People's Party	Doris Appiah	84	0.3	N/A
Majority		10,097	31.8	+10.6
Turnout		31,690	70.7	

2004 Ghanaian parliamentary election: Offinso South Source:Ghana Home Page
Party	Candidate	Votes	%	±%
New Patriotic Party	Kwabena Sarfo	19,694	51.9	−19.2
National Democratic Congress	Barbara Serwaa Asamoah	11,637	30.7	+3.6
Independent	Joseph Akwasi Kumah	6,170	16.3	N/A
People's National Convention	Daniel Adusei Poku	202	0.5	N/A
Convention People's Party	Desmond Osei Kwame	148	0.4	−0.4
Every Ghanaian Living Everywhere	Faibil Nsiah Boateng	95	0.3	N/A
Majority		8,057	21.2	−22.8

2000 Ghanaian parliamentary election: Offinso South Source:Adam Carr's Election Archives
Party	Candidate	Votes	%	±%
New Patriotic Party	Kwabena Sarfo	21,693	71.1	
National Democratic Congress	Butah K Adunkwa	8,257	27.1	
Convention People's Party	Kuting A Kwasi	250	0.8	
National Reform Party	Oheneba K Asamoah	173	0.6	
United Ghana Movement	Effah A Keneth	134	0.4	
Majority		13,436	44.0	
Turnout		30,507	69.4	

1996 Ghanaian parliamentary election: Offinso South Source:
Party	Candidate	Votes	%	±%
New Patriotic Party	Francis Kwasi Buor			

== See also ==
- List of Ghana Parliament constituencies
