= 2017–18 Wigan Athletic F.C. season =

Wigan Athletic
2017–18 season
- Owner: Dave Whelan
- Chairman: David Sharpe
- Manager: Paul Cook
- Stadium: DW Stadium
- League One: 1st (promoted)
- FA Cup: Quarter-finals
- EFL Cup: Second round
- EFL Trophy: Group stage
- Top goalscorer: League: Will Grigg (19); All: Will Grigg (25)
Home colours	Away colours

The 2017–18 season was Wigan Athletic's 86th year in existence and their first back in League One, after being relegated the previous season. Along with competing in the league, the club also participated in the FA Cup, EFL Cup and EFL Trophy. Paul Cook was appointed as manager on 31 May 2017, signing a 3-year deal, following the departure of much of the previous coaching staff the day before. The season covers the period from 1 July 2017 to 30 June 2018.

The season notably saw Wigan knock out Manchester City in the fifth round of the FA Cup. It was the third time Wigan had beaten City in the cup, having previously done so in the 2013 final, and the quarter-finals of the 2013–14 FA Cup.

== Transfers ==
=== Transfers in ===
Date from	Position	Nationality	Name	From	Fee	Ref.
1 July 2017	CB	(England)	Chey Dunkley	Oxford United	Free	
1 July 2017	CB	(England)	Terell Thomas	Charlton Athletic	Free	
6 July 2017	RW	(England)	Gavin Massey	Leyton Orient	Free	
3 August 2017	CF	(Republic of Ireland)	Noel Hunt	Portsmouth	Free	
7 August 2017	GK	(England)	Jamie Jones	Stevenage	Free	
29 August 2017	AM	(England)	Gary Roberts	Portsmouth	Free	
31 August 2017	CB	(Northern Ireland)	Alex Bruce	Bury	Free	
8 January 2018	LW	(Scotland)	Jamie Walker	Hearts	Undisclosed	
12 January 2018	CF	(England)	James Vaughan	Sunderland	Undisclosed	
31 January 2018	CF	(England)	Devante Cole	Fleetwood Town	Undisclosed	

=== Transfers out ===
Date from	Position	Nationality	Name	To	Fee	Ref.
1 July 2017	CB	(England)	Jake Buxton	Burton Albion	Mutual consent	(Note: Jake Buxton joined Burton Albion following his departure.)
1 July 2017	GK	(Scotland)	Matt Gilks	Scunthorpe United	Free	
1 July 2017	GK	(Finland)	Jussi Jääskeläinen	Atlético Kolkata	Released	
1 July 2017	RW	(France)	Gabriel Obertan	Levski Sofia	Free	
1 July 2017	LB	(England)	Andrew Taylor	Bolton Wanderers	Released	(Note: Andrew Taylor joined Bolton Wanderers following his release.)
1 July 2017	LB	(England)	Stephen Warnock	Burton Albion	Released	(Note: Stephen Warnock joined Burton Albion following his release.)
1 July 2017	CF	(England)	Nathan Randell	Skelmersdale United	Released	
1 July 2017	LB	(England)	Matthew Taylor	Derby County	Released	
5 July 2017	LB	(England)	Arnie Baxendale	Nantwich Town	Free	
5 July 2017	CB	(Scotland)	Jack Hendry	Dundee	Free	
5 July 2017	RB	(England)	Alex Lingard	Nantwich Town	Free	
13 July 2017	CF	(England)	Tom Powell	Hull City	Free	
19 July 2017	LW	(England)	Sanmi Odelusi	Colchester United	Mutual consent	
21 July 2017	CF	(France)	Mikael Mandron	Colchester United	Undisclosed	
25 July 2017	CF	(Northern Ireland)	Billy Mckay	Ross County	Undisclosed	
31 July 2017	FW	(England)	Chris Sang	Bury	Free	
1 August 2017	CF	(England)	Sam Cosgrove	Carlisle United	Free	
7 August 2017	SS	(England)	Kaiyne Woolery	Swindon Town	Undisclosed	
17 August 2017	CF	(England)	Omar Bogle	Cardiff City	£700,000	
31 August 2017	CM	(England)	Alex Gilbey	MK Dons	Undisclosed	
14 September 2017	CM	(England)	Danny Whitehead	Macclesfield Town	Free	
15 January 2018	CM	(Republic of Ireland)	Jack Byrne	Oldham Athletic	Undisclosed	
18 January 2018	CF	(England)	James Barrigan	Chorley	Mutual consent	
18 January 2018	CM	(England)	Josh Gregory	Chorley	Mutual consent	

=== Loans in ===
Start date	Position	Nationality	Name	From	End date	Ref.
12 July 2017	GK	(England)	Christian Walton	Brighton & Hove Albion	30 June 2018	
31 July 2017	LB	(Australia)	Callum Elder	Leicester City	30 June 2018	
31 July 2017	CM	(Wales)	Lee Evans	Wolverhampton Wanderers	10 January 2018	
2 August 2017	CF	(England)	Ivan Toney	Newcastle United	10 January 2018	
31 August 2017	GK	(Montenegro)	Matija Sarkic	Aston Villa	12 January 2018	
25 January 2018	CM	(Scotland)	Jay Fulton	Swansea City	30 June 2018	

=== Loans out ===
Start date	Position	Nationality	Name	To	End date	Ref.
18 August 2017	CM	(England)	Jordan Flores	Chesterfield	31 January 2018	
25 August 2017	LB	(England)	Andy Kellett	Chesterfield	30 June 2018	
25 August 2017	GK	(England)	Dan Lavercombe	Torquay United	1 September 2017	
29 August 2017	CM	(Republic of Ireland)	Jack Byrne	Oldham Athletic	1 January 2018	
29 August 2017	CB	(England)	Sam Stubbs	Crewe Alexandra	2 January 2018	
31 August 2017	RB	(England)	Luke Burke	AFC Fylde	30 June 2018	
31 August 2017	CB	(England)	Donervon Daniels	Rochdale	31 January 2018	
31 August 2017	AM	(England)	Josh Laurent	Bury	30 June 2018	
31 August 2017	CF	(England)	Callum Lang	Morecambe	30 June 2018	
31 August 2017	CM	(England)	Chris Merrie	Southport	7 November 2017	
26 September 2017	CF	(England)	James Barrigan	Warrington Town	28 October 2017	
23 December 2017	GK	(England)	Theo Roberts	Atherton Collieries	23 January 2018	
30 December 2017	CB	(England)	Terell Thomas	Sutton United	30 June 2018	
3 January 2018	GK	(Wales)	Owen Evans	Sutton United	28 February 2018	
5 January 2018	CB	(England)	Sam Stubbs	AFC Fylde	30 June 2018	
5 March 2018	GK	(England)	Theo Roberts	AFC Fylde	5 April 2018	
9 March 2018	CM	(England)	Jordan Flores	AFC Fylde	7 April 2018	
13 March 2018	CM	(England)	Luke Burgess	Chorley	30 June 2018	
15 March 2018	CM	(England)	Chris Merrie	Altrincham	30 April 2018	

=== Friendlies ===
As of 27 June 2017, Wigan Athletic have announced four pre-season friendlies against Southport, Notts County, Grimsby Town and Liverpool.

On 27 June 2017, the originally planned trip to Hartlepool United was cancelled due to too many long distance away matches as the season approaches.

On 1 August 2017, a Wigan Athletic XI beat Chorley 14–0 at Victory Park.

14 July 2017	Wigan Athletic	1–1	Liverpool	Wigan
19:30 BST	Gilbey 20'	Report	Salah 45'	Stadium: DW Stadium; Attendance: 12,715

18 July 2017	Southport	0–0	Wigan Athletic	Blowick
19:30 BST		Report		Stadium: Haig Avenue; Attendance: 1,356 (850 away)

22 July 2017	Notts County	1–2	Wigan Athletic	Nottingham
15:00 BST				Stadium: Meadow Lane

29 July 2017	Grimsby Town	1–1	Wigan Athletic	Cleethorpes
15:00 BST	Davies 88' (pen.)	Report	Lang 6'	Stadium: Blundell Park

== Competitions ==
=== Overall record ===
Competition	First match	Last match	Starting round	Final position	Record							
Competition	First match	Last match	Starting round	Final position	Pld	W	D	L	GF	GA	GD	Win %
League One	5 August 2017	5 May 2018	Matchday 1	1st	46	29	11	6	89	29	+60	63.04
FA Cup	4 November 2017	17 March 2018	First round	Quarter-Final	8	5	2	1	14	8	+6	62.50
EFL Cup	8 August 2017	27 August 2017	First round	Second round	2	1	0	1	3	5	−2	50.00
EFL Trophy	29 August 2017	7 November 2017	Group stage	Group stage	3	1	1	1	5	6	−1	33.33
Total					59	36	14	9	111	48	+63	61.02

Last updated: 5 May 2018

=== League One ===
==== League table ====
Pos	Team	Pld	W	D	L	GF	GA	GD	Pts	Promotion, qualification or relegation
1	Wigan Athletic (C, P)	46	29	11	6	89	29	+60	98	Promotion to the EFL Championship
2	Blackburn Rovers (P)	46	28	12	6	82	40	+42	96	Promotion to the EFL Championship
3	Shrewsbury Town	46	25	12	9	60	39	+21	87	Qualification for League One play-offs (Note: Four teams play for one spot and promotion to the EFL Championship.)
4	Rotherham United (O, P)	46	24	7	15	73	53	+20	79	Qualification for League One play-offs
5	Scunthorpe United	46	19	17	10	65	50	+15	74	Qualification for League One play-offs

Source: BBC Sport
Rules for classification: 1) Points; 2) Goal difference; 3) Number of goals scored
(C) Champions; (O) Play-off winners; (P) Promoted

==== Result summary ====
Overall								Home						Away					
Pld	W	D	L	GF	GA	GD	Pts	W	D	L	GF	GA	GD	W	D	L	GF	GA	GD
46	29	11	6	89	29	+60	98	13	8	2	37	11	+26	16	3	4	52	18	+34

Last updated: 5 May 2018.

==== Results by matchday ====
Matchday	1	2	3	4	5	6	7	8	9	10	11	12	13	14	15	16	17	18	19	20	21	22	23	24	25	26	27	28	29	30	31	32	33	34	35	36	37	38	39	40	41	42	43	44	45	46
Ground	A	H	A	H	A	A	H	H	A	H	H	A	H	A	A	H	H	H	A	H	A	A	H	H	A	H	A	H	A	H	H	A	H	A	A	A	H	A	H	A	H	H	A	A	H	A
Result	W	W	W	D	L	W	W	W	L	W	W	W	W	D	W	D	L	W	W	W	W	W	D	D	W	D	W	W	L	L	W	D	D	W	W	W	W	L	W	W	D	W	W	D	D	W
Position	10	3	1	2	8	6	5	2	4	2	2	2	1	2	2	2	2	2	1	1	1	1	1	1	1	1	1	1	1	2	3	3	3	2	3	2	1	3	2	1	1	1	1	1	1	1

Updated to match(es) played on 5 May 2018. Source: BBC
A = Away; H = Home; W = Win; D = Draw; L = Loss

==== Matches ====
5 August 2017 1	Milton Keynes Dons	0–1	Wigan Athletic	Denbigh
15:00 BST	Williams (yellow card) 5'; Wootton (yellow card) 50' (yellow-red card) 58'; Muirhead (yellow card) 83'	Report	Morsy (yellow card) 22'; Powell 38'; Elder (red card) 44'; Thomas (yellow card) 71'; Massey (yellow card) 72'	Stadium: Stadium:mk; Attendance: 9,164; Referee: Kevin Johnson

13 August 2017 2	Wigan Athletic	4–1	Bury	Wigan
15:00 BST	Jacobs 12'; Powell 53', 64' (pen.); Powell (yellow card) 70'; Evans 90+2'	Report	Bruce 15'; Reilly (yellow card) 45'; Aldred (yellow card) 47'; Murphy (yellow card) 64'; Bruce (yellow card) 73'	Stadium: DW Stadium; Attendance: 9,159; Referee: Oliver Langford

19 August 2017 3	Oldham Athletic	0–2	Wigan Athletic	Oldham
15:00 BST	Dummigan (yellow card) 40'; Banks (yellow card) 60'	Report	Toney 8'; Jacobs 16' (yellow card) 39'; Burn (yellow card) 34'; Morsy (yellow card) 45+2'	Stadium: Boundary Park; Attendance: 5,446; Referee: Eddie Ilderton

26 August 2017 4	Wigan Athletic	1–1	Portsmouth	Wigan
15:00 BST	Toney 8'; Dunkley (red card) 59'	Report	Evans (yellow card) 25' (yellow-red card) 89'; Donohue (yellow card) 52'; Pitman (yellow card) 60'; Whatmough (yellow card) 67'; Chaplin 76'	Stadium: DW Stadium; Attendance: 9,685; Referee: Robert Jones

9 September 2017 5	Shrewsbury Town	1–0	Wigan Athletic	Shrewsbury
15:00 BST	Payne 26'; Rodman (yellow card) 45+1'; Whalley (yellow card) 84'; Henderson (yellow card) 90+3'	Report	Toney (yellow card) 45+2'; James (yellow card) 75'; Evans (yellow card) 90+2'	Stadium: New Meadow; Attendance: 6,929; Referee: Mark Heywood

12 September 2017 6	Charlton Athletic	0–3	Wigan Athletic	Charlton
19:45 BST	Holmes (yellow card) 53'; Forster-Caskey (yellow card) 75'; Solly (yellow card) 90+4'	Report	Massey 44', 70'; Morsy (yellow card) 51' (goal) 87'; Bruce (yellow card) 64'; Toney (yellow card) 82'	Stadium: The Valley; Attendance: 10,172; Referee: Charles Breakspear

16 September 2017 7	Wigan Athletic	3–0	Bristol Rovers	Wigan
15:00 BST	Powell 30'; Grigg 49'; Morsy (yellow card) 67'; Jacobs (yellow card) 72'; Evans (yellow card) 81'; Massey 90+5'	Report	Sweeney (red card) 30'	Stadium: DW Stadium; Attendance: 8,732; Referee: Carl Boyeson

19 September 2017 8	Wigan Athletic	1–0	Northampton Town	Wigan
19:45 BST	Morsy (yellow card) 44'; Jacobs 56' (yellow card) 58'	Report	Bowditch (yellow card) 78'	Stadium: DW Stadium; Attendance: 7,777; Referee: Anthony Backhouse

23 September 2017 9	Peterborough United	3–2	Wigan Athletic	Peterborough
15:00 BST	Edwards (yellow card) 5'; Morias 47', 84'; Marriott 90'	Report	Jacobs 33'; Burn (yellow card) 49'; Evans (yellow card) 81'; Colclough 87'	Stadium: London Road Stadium; Attendance: 6,099; Referee: Chris Sarginson

26 September 2017 10	Wigan Athletic	1–0	Plymouth Argyle	Wigan
19:45 BST	Toney (yellow card) 77'; Powell 83' (pen.)	Report	Miller (yellow card) 14'; Ness (yellow card) 27'; Solokik (yellow card) 62'; Carey (yellow card) 64'	Stadium: DW Stadium; Attendance: 7,868; Referee: Seb Stockbridge

30 September 2017 11	Wigan Athletic	2–0	Walsall	Wigan
15:00 BST	Morsy (yellow card) 10'; Grigg 30', 54' (pen.); Power (yellow card) 75'	Report	Wilson (yellow card) 52'	Stadium: DW Stadium; Attendance: 8,107; Referee: David Coote

7 October 2017 12	Scunthorpe United	1–2	Wigan Athletic	Scunthorpe
15:00 BST	Morris (yellow card) 28'; Wallace (yellow card) 33' van Veen (yellow card) 77'; Ojo 90'	Report	Burn 51'; Evans (red card) 56'; Powell 74'; Power (yellow card) 77'	Stadium: Glanford Park; Attendance: 4,480; Referee: Robert Lewis

14 October 2017 13	Wigan Athletic	3–0	Southend United	Wigan
15:00 BST	Jacobs 8'; Powell 84'; Toney 88'	Report	McGlashan (red card) 59'	Stadium: DW Stadium; Attendance: 8,133; Referee: John Busby

17 October 2017 14	Gillingham	1–1	Wigan Athletic	Gillingham
19:45 BST	Eaves 55'	Report	Morsy 82' (yellow card) 84'	Stadium: Priestfield Stadium; Attendance: 4,705; Referee: Brett Huxtable

21 October 2017 15	Blackpool	1–3	Wigan Athletic	Blackpool
15:00 BST	Vassell 8'; Almeida (yellow card) 40'	Report	Toney (yellow card) 40'; Dunkley 45+1', 54'; Powell (yellow card) 69'; Byrne (yellow card) 70'; Perkins 82'; Hunt (yellow card) 90+5'	Stadium: Bloomfield Road; Attendance: 5,817; Referee: Andy Haines

28 October 2017 16	Wigan Athletic	0–0	Blackburn Rovers	Wigan
15:00 BST		Report	Bennett (yellow card) 43' (yellow-red card) 58'; Smallwood (yellow card) 56'; Whittingham (yellow card) 82'; Chapman (yellow card) 85'	Stadium: DW Stadium; Attendance: 11,211; Referee: Darren England

18 November 2017 17	Wigan Athletic	1–2	Bradford City	Wigan
15:00 GMT	Dunkley 24'; Burn (yellow card) 77'	Report	Wyke 14'; Robinson 90+2'	Stadium: DW Stadium; Attendance: 10,649; Referee: David Webb

21 November 2017 18	Wigan Athletic	3–0	Doncaster Rovers	Wigan
19:45 GMT	Burn (yellow card) 22'; Byrne (yellow card) 31'; Wright 40' (o.g.); Colclough 45+2', 58' (yellow card) 53'	Report	Houghton (yellow card) 34'; Wright (yellow card) 36'	Stadium: DW Stadium; Attendance: 7,966; Referee: Carl Boyeson

25 November 2017 19	Rotherham United	1–3	Wigan Athletic	Rotherham
15:00 GMT	Ihiekwe (yellow card) 13'; Ball 16'; Wood (yellow card) 45+1'; Towell (yellow card) 47'	Report	Grigg 14'; Bruce 28'; Dunkley (yellow card) 56'; Jacobs 60'	Stadium: New York Stadium; Attendance: 8,443; Referee: Seb Stockbridge

9 December 2017 20	Wigan Athletic	2–0	Fleetwood Town	Wigan
15:00 GMT	Powell 7'; Burn 38'	Report	Schwabl (yellow card) 31'; Dempsey (yellow card) 37'; Biggins (yellow card) 84'	Stadium: DW Stadium; Attendance: 8,879; Referee: Andy Haines

16 December 2017 21	AFC Wimbledon	0–4	Wigan Athletic	Kingston upon Thames
15:00 GMT	Forrester (red card)	Report	Jacobs 57'; Powell 73'; Power 80'; Toney 90'	Stadium: Cherry Red Records Stadium; Attendance: 4,289; Referee: Brett Huxtable

23 December 2017 22	Oxford United	0–7	Wigan Athletic	Oxford
15:00 GMT		Report	Grigg 11', 52', 54'; Powell 18'; Massey 29'; Power 62', 77'	Stadium: Kassam Stadium; Attendance: 7,957; Referee: Robert Lewis

26 December 2017 23	Wigan Athletic	0–0	Shrewsbury Town	Wigan
15:00 GMT		Report		Stadium: DW Stadium; Attendance: 11,115; Referee: David Webb

29 December 2017 24	Wigan Athletic	0–0	Charlton Athletic	Wigan
19:45 GMT		Report		Stadium: DW Stadium; Attendance: 9,297; Referee: Trevor Kettle

1 January 2018 25	Northampton Town	0–1	Wigan Athletic	Northampton
15:00 GMT		Report	Powell 5'	Stadium: Sixfieds Stadium; Attendance: 5,328; Referee: Mark Heywood

13 January 2018 26	Wigan Athletic	0–0	Peterborough United	Wigan
15:00 GMT		Report		Stadium: DW Stadium; Attendance: 8,602; Referee: Eddie Ilderton

20 January 2018 27	Plymouth Argyle	1–3	Wigan Athletic	Plymouth
	Carey 27' (pen.)		Grigg 29'; Massey 45'; Burn 69'	Stadium: Home Park; Attendance: 11,942

3 February 2018 28	Wigan Athletic	2–0	Gillingham	Wigan
	Grigg 10'; Powell 34'	Report	Garmston (yellow card) 17'; Ehmer (yellow card) 21'; Eaves (yellow card) 71'	Stadium: DW Stadium; Attendance: 8,384; Referee: Nick Kinseley

10 February 2018 29	Southend United	3–1	Wigan Athletic	Southend-on-Sea
15:00 GMT	Turner 3'; Ferdinand (yellow card) 31'; Fortuné 36'; Kightly 83'	Report	Powell (yellow card) 43'; Dunkley (yellow card) 47'; Vaughan 67' (yellow card) 90+4'	Stadium: Roots Hall; Attendance: 7,623; Referee: Andy Woolmer

13 February 2018 30	Wigan Athletic	0–2	Blackpool	Wigan
19:45 GMT	James (yellow card) 40'; Burn (yellow card) 56'; Grigg (yellow card) 89'	Report	Gnanduillet 3'; Mellor 37' Mellor (yellow card) 58'; Daniel (yellow card) 49'; Lumley (yellow card) 85'	Stadium: DW Stadium; Attendance: 8,302; Referee: Jeremy Simpson

24 February 2018 31	Wigan Athletic	1–0	Rochdale	Wigan
15:00 GMT	Jacobs 12'	Report	McNulty (yellow card) 36'; Camps (yellow card) 55'	Stadium: DW Stadium; Attendance: 8,654; Referee: Ben Toner

4 March 2018 32	Blackburn Rovers	2–2	Wigan Athletic	Blackburn
15:00 GMT	Armstrong 6'; Bennett 17', (yellow card) 60'; Evans (yellow card) 25'; Nyambe (yellow card) 86'	Report	Morsy (yellow card) 35'; Elder (yellow card) 54'; Jacobs 63'; Powell (yellow card) 68'; Power 73'	Stadium: Ewood Park; Attendance: 16,142; Referee: Geoff Eltringham

10 March 2018 33	Wigan Athletic	3–3	Scunthorpe United	Wigan
15:00 GMT	Dunkley 13'; Grigg 43'; Roberts 87'; Burn (yellow card) 90+2'; Bruce (yellow card) 90+2'	Report	Hopper 16', 45+2'; Toney 53'; Holmes (yellow card) 77'	Stadium: DW Stadium; Attendance: 8,438; Referee: Dean Whitestone

14 March 2018 34	Bradford City	0–1	Wigan Athletic	Bradford
	McMahon (yellow card) 54'; Dieng (yellow card) 59'; Kilgallon (yellow card) 90+5'	Report	Dunkley (yellow card) 11'; Vaughan (yellow card) 43'; Morsy (yellow card) 67'; Jacobs 90+1', (yellow card) 90+1'	Stadium: Valley Parade; Referee: Martin Coy

21 March 2018 35	Walsall	0–3	Wigan Athletic	Walsall
19:45 GMT		Report	Jacobs 31'; Fulton 35'; Dunkley 40'; Power (yellow card) 81'	Stadium: Bescot Stadium; Attendance: 4,477; Referee: John Brooks

24 March 2018 36	Bury	0–2	Wigan Athletic	Bury
	Maguire (yellow card) 84'	Report	Powell (yellow card) 25', (goal) 26'; Dunkley 50'	Stadium: Gigg Lane; Attendance: 5,207; Referee: Jon Moss

30 March 2018 37	Wigan Athletic	3–0	Oldham Athletic	Wigan
13:00 BST	Grigg 40'; Vaughan 49'; Powell 66'	Report	Pringle (yellow card) 24'; Gardner (yellow card) 30'; Doyle (yellow card) 83'	Stadium: DW Stadium; Attendance: 10,625; Referee: Robert Jones

2 April 2018 38	Portsmouth	2–1	Wigan Athletic	Portsmouth
17:30 BST	Thompson (yellow card) 25'; Pitman 40' (pen.); Lowe 55'; Walkes (yellow card) 71'; Naismith (yellow card) 81'	Report	Elder (yellow card) 19'; Grigg 89'; Walton (yellow card) 90+4'	Stadium: Fratton Park; Attendance: 17,842; Referee: Tim Robinson

7 April 2018 39	Wigan Athletic	5–1	Milton Keynes Dons	Wigan
15:00 BST	Ebanks-Landell 24' (o.g.); Burn (yellow card) 54'; Powell 57'; Byrne (yellow card) 63'; Grigg 11', 74', 76'	Report	Golbourne (yellow card) 11'; Brittain 35'; Agard (yellow card) 45'; Upson (yellow card) 71'	Stadium: DW Stadium; Attendance: 8,404; Referee: Seb Stockbridge

10 April 2018 40	Rochdale	1–4	Wigan Athletic	Rochdale
19:45 BST	Rafferty (yellow card) 71'; Davies 87' (pen.)	Report	Burn 17'; Vaughan 54'; Jacobs 60'; Grigg 62'; Walton (yellow card) 88'	Stadium: Spotland Stadium; Attendance: 3,850; Referee: David Webb

14 April 2018 41	Wigan Athletic	0–0	Rotherham United	Wigan
15:00 BST	Byrne (yellow card) 32'	Report	Emmanuel (yellow card) 38'; Vaulks (yellow card) 39'; Ihiekwe (yellow card) 90+1'	Stadium: DW Stadium; Attendance: 9,630; Referee: Chris Sarginson

17 April 2018 42	Wigan Athletic	1–0	Oxford United	Wigan
19:45 BST	Grigg 87'	Report	Kane (yellow card) 31'; Carroll (yellow card) 75'; Brannagan (yellow card) 80'	Stadium: DW Stadium; Attendance: 8,316; Referee: Trevor Kettle

21 April 2018 43	Fleetwood Town	0–4	Wigan Athletic	Fleetwood
15:00 BST		Report	Power 33'; Masey 37'; Burn 57'; Dunkley 66'	Stadium: Highbury Stadium (Fleetwood); Attendance: 3,836, (1,122 away)

24 April 2018 44	Bristol Rovers	1–1	Wigan Athletic	Bristol
19:45 BST	Sercombe 28'	Report	Colclough 80'	Stadium: Memorial Stadium (Bristol); Attendance: 8,414, (460 away)

28 April 2018 45	Wigan Athletic	1–1	AFC Wimbledon	Wigan
15:00 BST	Jacobs 69'	Report	Pigott 24'	Stadium: DW Stadium; Attendance: 12,554

5 May 2018 46	Doncaster Rovers	0–1	Wigan Athletic	Doncaster
17:30 BST		Report	Grigg 75' (yellow card) 76'	Stadium: Keepmoat Stadium; Attendance: 12,057; Referee: David Webb

=== FA Cup ===
On 16 October 2017, Wigan Athletic were drawn at home to Crawley Town in the first round. A trip to non-league side AFC Fylde was confirmed for the second round. Victory over AFC Fylde in the second round replay meant a trip to AFC Bournemouth was handed to the Latics.

4 November 2017 First round	Wigan Athletic	2–1	Crawley Town	Wigan
15:00 GMT	Morsy (yellow card) 26'; Toney 29'; Evans 71'	Report	Roberts 20'	Stadium: DW Stadium; Attendance: 3,288; Referee: Martin Coy

1 December 2017 Second round	AFC Fylde	1–1	Wigan Athletic	Medlar-with-Wesham
19:55 GMT	Rowe 70' (pen.); Edmundson (yellow card) 90+1'	Report	Grigg 44'	Stadium: Mill Farm; Attendance: 3,351; Referee: Darren Drysdale

12 December 2017 Second round replay	Wigan Athletic	3–2	AFC Fylde	Wigan
19:45 GMT	Toney 31'; Grigg 80', 84'	Report	Grand 41'; Rowe 65'; Finley (yellow card) 74'	Stadium: DW Stadium; Attendance: 3,124; Referee: Ross Joyce

6 January 2018 Third round	AFC Bournemouth	2–2	Wigan Athletic	Boscombe
15:00 GMT	Mousset 55'; Cook 90+2'	Report	Grigg 4'; Hyndman 29' (o.g.)	Stadium: Dean Court; Attendance: 9,894; Referee: Andy Madley

17 January 2018 Third round replay	Wigan Athletic	3–0	Bournemouth	Wigan
19:45 GMT	Morsy 9'; Burn 73'; Elder 76'	Report		Stadium: DW Stadium; Attendance: 4,709; Referee: Stuart Attwell

27 January 2018 Fourth round	Wigan Athletic	2–0	West Ham United	Wigan
15:00 GMT	Grigg 7', 72' (pen.)			Stadium: DW Stadium; Attendance: 14,194; Referee: Chris Kavanagh

19 February 2018 Fifth round	Wigan Athletic	1–0	Manchester City	Wigan
19:55 GMT	Grigg 79'			Stadium: DW Stadium; Attendance: 19,242; Referee: Anthony Taylor

17 March 2018 Quarter-finals	Wigan Athletic	0–2	Southampton	Wigan
13:30 GMT	Burn (yellow card) 72'; Dunkley (yellow card) 85'	Report	Højbjerg 62'; Soares 90+1'	Stadium: DW Stadium; Referee: Michael Oliver

=== EFL Cup ===
On 16 June 2017, Wigan Athletic were drawn at home to Blackpool in the first round. An away trip to Aston Villa was confirmed for the second round.

8 August 2017 First round	Wigan Athletic	2–1	Blackpool	Wigan
19:45 BST	Laurent 17'; Flores 45+1'	Report	Gnanduillet 59'	Stadium: DW Stadium; Attendance: 3,391; Referee: Chris Sarginson

22 August 2017 Second round	Aston Villa	4–1	Wigan Athletic	Birmingham
19:45 BST	Hogan 19', 44'; Adomah 36'; O'Hare (yellow card) 68'; Bjarnason 74'	Report	Colclough 43'; Burke (yellow card) 62'	Stadium: Villa Park; Attendance: 18,108; Referee: Darren Drysdale

=== EFL Trophy ===
On 25 July 2017, Wigan confirmed their group stage opponents and fixtures.

Pos	Lge	Team	Pld	W	PW	PL	L	GF	GA	GD	Pts	Qualification
1	L1	Blackpool (Q)	3	2	0	1	0	7	3	+4	7	Round 2
2	L2	Accrington Stanley (Q)	3	2	0	0	1	8	4	+4	6	Round 2
3	L1	Wigan Athletic (E)	3	1	1	0	1	5	6	−1	5	
4	ACA	Middlesbrough U21s (E)	3	0	0	0	3	4	11	−7	0	

Updated to match(es) played on 7 November 2017. Source: EFL.com
(E) Eliminated; (Q) Qualified to the phase indicated

29 August 2017 Group Game 1	Blackpool	1–1 (4–5 p)	Wigan Athletic	Blackpool
19:00 BST	D'Almeida (yellow card) 4'; Sinclair-Smith 87'	Report	Merrie (yellow card) 13'; Gilbey 63'	Stadium: Bloomfield Road; Attendance: 1,532 (622 away)
	Penalties
	Taylor (penalty scored); Clayton (penalty missed); Mellor (penalty scored); Delfouneso (penalty scored); Roache (penalty scored); Sinclair-Smith (penalty missed)		Power (penalty scored); Gilbey (penalty scored); Hunt (penalty scored); Maffeo (penalty scored); Barrigan (penalty missed); Laurent (penalty scored)

24 October 2017 Group Game 2	Wigan Athletic	4–1	Middlesbrough U23s	Wigan
19:45 BST	Evans 33' (pen.); Maffeo 41'; Colclough (yellow card) 56' (goal) 74'; Hunt 72'	Report	Liddle (yellow card) 33'; Armstrong 53'; Reading (yellow card) 86'	Stadium: DW Stadium; Referee: Mark Heywood

7 November 2017 Group Game 3	Wigan Athletic	0–4	Accrington Stanley	Wigan
19:45 GMT	Golden (yellow card) 24'; McGuffie (yellow card) 65'	Report	Edwards 12'; Sousa 30', 56'; Wilks (yellow card) 65'; Leacock-McLeod 89'	Stadium: DW Stadium; Attendance: 1,473; Referee: Peter Bankes

== Statistics ==
As of 13 May 2018

No.	Pos	Nat	Player	Total		League One		FA Cup		League Cup		League Trophy	
No.	Pos	Nat	Player	Apps	Goals	Apps	Goals	Apps	Goals	Apps	Goals	Apps	Goals
1	GK	(England) ENG	Christian Walton	35	0	31	0	4	0	0	0	0	0
2	DF	(England) ENG	Nathan Byrne	49	0	42	0	7	0	0	0	0	0
3	DF	(Australia) AUS	Callum Elder	33	1	24+3	0	5	1	1	0	0	0
4	MF	(England) ENG	David Perkins	21	1	2+11	1	3+2	0	1	0	2	0
5	MF	(Egypt) EGY	Sam Morsy	47	3	41	2	6	1	0	0	0	0
6	MF	(England) ENG	Max Power	49	5	29+11	5	7	0	1	0	1	0
7	MF	(Scotland) SCO	Jamie Walker	8	0	1+7	0	0	0	0	0	0	0
8	FW	(England) ENG	James Vaughan	19	3	7+12	3	0	0	0	0	0	0
9	FW	(Northern Ireland) NIR	Will Grigg	53	26	29+14	19	6+2	7	2	0	0	0
10	FW	(England) ENG	Devante Cole	6	0	0+6	0	0	0	0	0	0	0
11	FW	(England) ENG	Gavin Massey	50	6	35+7	6	8	0	0	0	0	0
12	DF	(England) ENG	Donervon Daniels	4	0	1	0	0	0	2	0	1	0
14	DF	(England) ENG	Alex Bruce	9	1	4+2	1	3	0	0	0	0	0
17	MF	(England) ENG	Michael Jacobs	50	12	44	12	4+2	0	0	0	0	0
18	MF	(England) ENG	Gary Roberts	35	1	6+21	1	5+3	0	0	0	0	0
21	DF	(England) ENG	Terell Thomas	8	0	0+3	0	0	0	2	0	3	0
22	DF	(England) ENG	Chey Dunkley	50	7	43	7	6+1	0	0	0	0	0
23	GK	(England) ENG	Jamie Jones	19	0	15	0	2	0	1	0	1	0
24	FW	(Republic of Ireland) IRL	Noel Hunt	13	1	0+7	0	0+3	0	0+1	0	1+1	1
25	MF	(England) ENG	Nick Powell	45	15	38+1	15	4+2	0	0	0	0	0
26	DF	(England) ENG	Reece James	28	0	22	0	3+1	0	1	0	1	0
27	FW	(England) ENG	Ryan Colclough	35	6	11+15	4	2+4	0	2	1	1	1
28	MF	(Scotland) SCO	Jay Fulton	6	1	4+1	1	0+1	0	0	0	0	0
30	FW	(England) ENG	James Barrigan	2	0	0	0	0	0	0	0	1+1	0
31	GK	(Montenegro) MNE	Matija Sarkic	3	0	0	0	2	0	0	0	1	0
33	DF	(England) ENG	Dan Burn	53	6	45	5	7+1	1	0	0	0	0
35	MF	(England) ENG	Luke Burgess	5	0	0	0	0	0	0+2	0	3+0	0
36	MF	(England) ENG	Chris Merrie	1	0	0	0	0	0	0	0	1	0
40	GK	(Wales) WAL	Owen Evans	1	0	0	0	0	0	1	0	0	0
41	GK	(England) ENG	Theo Roberts	1	0	0	0	0	0	0	0	1	0
42	FW	(Zambia) ZAM	Mwiya Malumo	1	0	0	0	0	0	0	0	1	0
43	DF	(England) ENG	Will McGuffie	1	0	0	0	0	0	0	0	1	0
44	DF	(England) ENG	Adam Long	2	0	0	0	0	0	0	0	2	0
46	FW	(Democratic Republic of the Congo) COD	Divin Baningime	1	0	0	0	0	0	0	0	1	0
47	DF	(United States) USA	Tylor Golden	2	0	0	0	0	0	0	0	2	0
48	DF	(England) ENG	Anthony Plant	1	0	0	0	0	0	0	0	1	0
49	DF	(Spain) ESP	Víctor Maffeo	3	1	0	0	0	0	0	0	1+2	1
52	MF	(England) ENG	Mitchell Culshaw	1	0	0	0	0	0	0	0	0+1	0
53	MF	(Scotland) SCO	Jensen Weir	1	0	0	0	0	0	0	0	0+1	0
Player(s) out on loan:
15	MF	(England) ENG	Jordan Flores	1	1	0	0	0	0	1	1	0	0
19	MF	(England) ENG	Josh Laurent	3	1	0	0	0	0	2	1	1	0
29	DF	(England) ENG	Luke Burke	3	0	0	0	0	0	2	0	1	0
34	DF	(England) ENG	Sam Stubbs	1	0	0	0	0	0	0+1	0	0	0
36	MF	(England) ENG	Chris Merrie	2	0	0	0	0	0	1	0	1	0
39	FW	(England) ENG	Callum Lang	3	0	0	0	0	0	1+1	0	1	0
Player(s) who left the club:
N/A	MF	(Wales) WAL	Lee Evans	23	3	20	1	2	1	0	0	1	1
N/A	MF	(England) ENG	Alex Gilbey	5	1	0+2	0	0	0	2	0	1	1
N/A	FW	(England) ENG	Ivan Toney	28	6	10+14	4	2+2	2	0	0	0	0

=== Disciplinary record ===
As of 11 March 2018

Rank	No.	Nat.	Po.	Name	Championship			FA Cup			League Cup			League Trophy			Total		
Rank	No.	Nat.	Po.	Name	Yellow card	(yellow card) (yellow-red card)	Red card	Yellow card	(yellow card) (yellow-red card)	Red card	Yellow card	(yellow card) (yellow-red card)	Red card	Yellow card	(yellow card) (yellow-red card)	Red card	Yellow card	(yellow card) (yellow-red card)	Red card
1	5	(Egypt)	CM	Sam Morsy	11	0	0	1	0	0	0	0	0	0	0	0	12	0	0
2	22	(England)	CB	Chey Dunkley	5	0	1	1	0	0	0	0	0	0	0	0	6	0	1
2	25	(England)	AM	Nick Powell	7	0	0	0	0	0	0	0	0	0	0	0	7	0	0
2	33	(England)	CB	Dan Burn	6	0	0	1	0	0	0	0	0	0	0	0	7	0	0
5	2	(England)	RB	Nathan Byrne	7	0	0	0	0	0	0	0	0	0	0	0	7	0	0
5	6	(England)	CM	Max Power	4	0	0	2	0	0	0	0	0	0	0	0	6	0	0
5	—	(Wales)	CM	Lee Evans	4	0	1	0	0	0	0	0	0	0	0	0	4	0	1
8	11	(England)	RW	Gavin Massey	2	0	0	2	0	0	0	0	0	0	0	0	4	0	0
8	17	(England)	LW	Michael Jacobs	5	0	0	0	0	0	0	0	0	0	0	0	5	0	0
8	—	(England)	CF	Ivan Toney	4	0	0	0	0	0	0	0	0	0	0	0	4	0	0
11	3	(Australia)	LB	Callum Elder	2	0	1	1	0	0	0	0	0	0	0	0	3	0	1
11	8	(England)	CF	James Vaughan	4	0	0	0	0	0	0	0	0	0	0	4	0	0	
11	27	(England)	LW	Ryan Colclough	1	0	0	2	0	0	0	0	0	0	0	0	3	0	0
14	14	(Northern Ireland)	CB	Alex Bruce	2	0	0	0	0	0	0	0	0	0	0	0	2	0	0
14	26	(England)	LB	Reece James	2	0	0	0	0	0	0	0	0	0	0	0	2	0	0
14	29	(England)	CB	Luke Burke	0	0	0	0	0	0	2	0	0	0	0	0	2	0	0
17	1	(England)	GK	Christian Walton	2	0	0	1	0	0	0	0	0	0	0	0	3	0	0
17	4	(England)	CM	David Perkins	0	0	0	1	0	0	0	0	0	0	0	0	1	0	0
17	9	(Northern Ireland)	CF	Will Grigg	1	0	0	1	0	0	0	0	0	0	0	0	2	0	0
17	21	(England)	CB	Terell Thomas	1	0	0	0	0	0	0	0	0	0	0	0	1	0	0
17	24	(Republic of Ireland)	CF	Noel Hunt	1	0	0	0	0	0	0	0	0	0	0	0	1	0	0
17	28	(Scotland)	CM	Jay Fulton	0	0	0	1	0	0	0	0	0	0	0	0	1	0	0
17	36	(England)	CM	Chris Merrie	0	0	0	0	0	0	0	0	0	1	0	0	1	0	0
Total					58	0	3	14	0	0	2	0	0	1	0	0	75	0	3
