= 2016–17 Wigan Athletic F.C. season =

Wigan Athletic
2016–17 season
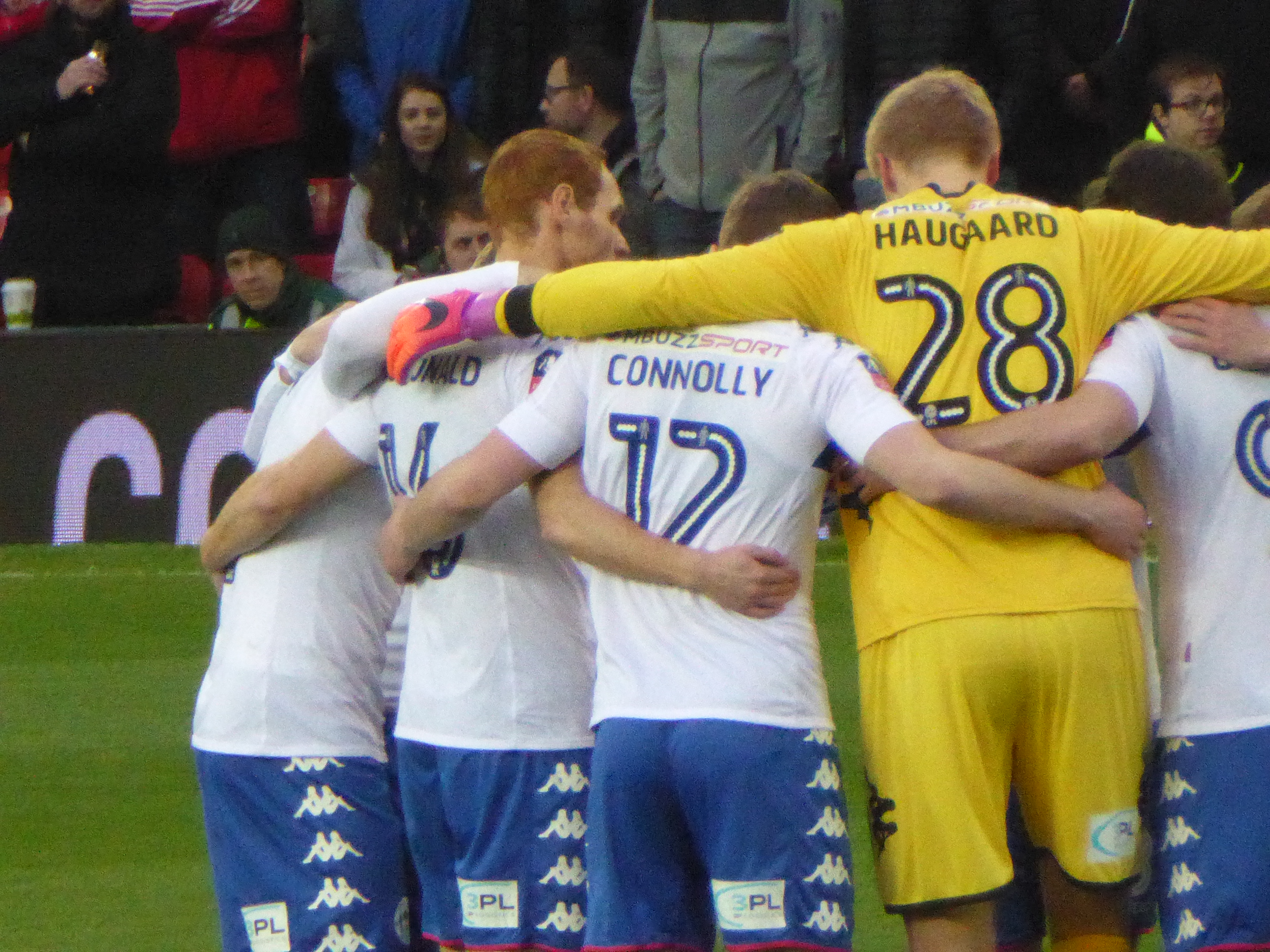
- Team huddle before the Latics' FA Cup clash with Manchester United, January 2017
- Owner: Dave Whelan
- Chairman: David Sharpe
- Manager: Gary Caldwell (until 25 October 2016); Warren Joyce (2 November 2016 – 13 March 2017); Graham Barrow (from 17 March 2017)
- Stadium: DW Stadium
- Championship: 23rd (relegated)
- FA Cup: Fourth round
- League Cup: First round
- Top goalscorer: League: Nick Powell (6); All: Will Grigg (7)
Home colours	Away colours

The 2016–17 season was Wigan Athletic's 85th year in existence and their first back in the Championship, after gaining promotion the previous season. Along with competing in the Championship, the club also participated in the FA Cup and League Cup. The season covered the period from 1 July 2016 to 30 June 2017.

== Transfers ==
=== In ===
Date from	Position	Nationality	Name	From	Fee	Ref.
1 July 2016	CB	(England)	Dan Burn	Fulham	Free transfer	
1 July 2016	CM	(England)	Alex Gilbey	Colchester United	Undisclosed	
1 July 2016	LB	(England)	Stephen Warnock	Derby County	Free transfer	
12 July 2016	SS	(England)	Nick Powell	Manchester United	Free transfer	
26 July 2016	CB	(England)	Jake Buxton	Derby County	Undisclosed	
13 August 2016	CM	(Wales)	Shaun MacDonald	AFC Bournemouth	Undisclosed	
17 August 2016	AM	(Spain)	Jordi Gómez	Sunderland	Undisclosed	
31 August 2016	RM	(England)	Nathan Byrne	Wolverhampton Wanderers	£500,000	
31 August 2016	SS	(England)	Kaiyne Woolery	Bolton Wanderers	Undisclosed	
31 January 2017	GK	(Scotland)	Matt Gilks	Rangers	Undisclosed	
31 January 2017	CF	(France)	Mikael Mandron	Eastleigh	Undisclosed	
31 January 2017	RW	(France)	Gabriel Obertan	Anzhi Makhachkala	Free transfer	
31 January 2017	CAM	(England)	Josh Laurent	Hartlepool United	Undisclosed	
31 January 2017	MF	(Republic of Ireland)	Jack Byrne	Manchester City	Undisclosed	
31 January 2017	CF	(England)	Omar Bogle	Grimsby Town	Undisclosed	

=== Out ===
Date from	Position	Nationality	Name	To	Fee	Ref.
1 July 2016	CB	(England)	Leon Barnett	Bury	Released	(Note: Following Barnett's release, he joined Bury.)
1 July 2016	CF	(Republic of Ireland)	Matthew Hamilton	Marine	Released	
1 July 2016	RW	(England)	Ryan Jennings	AFC Fylde	Released	
1 July 2016	RB	(Scotland)	Kevin McNaughton	Inverness Caledonian Thistle	Released	(Note: Following McNaughton's release, he joined Inverness Caledonian Thistle.)
1 July 2016	CM	(Poland)	Adrian Purzycki	Fortuna Sittard	Released	
1 July 2016	CF	(England)	Louis Robles	Bangor City	Released	
1 July 2016	RB	(England)	Reece Wabara	Bolton Wanderers	Released	(Note: Following Wabara's release, he joined Bolton Wanderers.)
6 July 2016	DM	(Republic of Ireland)	Chris McCann	Atlanta United	Free transfer	
3 August 2016	GK	(England)	Lee Nicholls	Milton Keynes Dons	Free transfer	
4 August 2016	CB	(England)	Jason Pearce	Charlton Athletic	Undisclosed	
12 August 2016	MF	(Wales)	Emyr Huws	Cardiff City	Undisclosed	
25 August 2016	CM	(England)	Tim Chow	Ross County	Undisclosed	
7 January 2017	CF	(Wales)	Craig Davies	Scunthorpe United	Undisclosed	
31 January 2017	AM	(Spain)	Jordi Gomez	Rayo Vallecano	Undisclosed	
31 January 2017	MF	(Netherlands)	Yanic Wildschut	Norwich City	Undisclosed	
10 April 2017	MF	(England)	Danny O'Brien	IF Kraft	Released	

=== Loans in ===
Date from	Position	Nationality	Name	From	Date until	Ref.
1 July 2016	RB	(England)	Kyle Knoyle	West Ham United	14 January 2017	
20 July 2016	GK	(Hungary)	Ádám Bogdán	Liverpool	24 November 2016	
16 August 2016	LB	(England)	Luke Garbutt	Everton	2 January 2017	
30 August 2016	CB	(England)	Reece Burke	West Ham United	End of Season	
31 August 2016	CF	(England)	Adam Le Fondre	Cardiff City	31 January 2017	(Note: On 31 January 2017, Adam Le Fondre's loan was terminated.)
7 January 2017	GK	(Denmark)	Jakob Haugaard	Stoke City	21 April 2017	
14 January 2017	CB	(England)	Callum Connolly	Everton	End of Season	
20 January 2017	AM	(England)	Marcus Browne	West Ham United	End of Season	
20 January 2017	CM	(England)	Ryan Tunnicliffe	Fulham	End of Season	
25 January 2017	DM	(England)	Jamie Hanson	Derby County	End of Season	
31 January 2017	CB	(Northern Ireland)	Alex Bruce	Hull City	End of Season	
31 January 2017	CM	(England)	James Weir	Hull City	End of Season	

=== Loans out ===
Date from	Position	Nationality	Name	To	Date until	Ref.
13 July 2016	CF	(Northern Ireland)	Billy Mckay	Oldham Athletic	31 January 2017	(Note: On 31 January 2017, Billy Mckay's loan at Oldham Athletic was terminated.)
22 July 2016	CM	(England)	Danny Whitehead	Cheltenham Town	1 January 2017	(Note: On 1 January 2017, Danny Whitehead's loan at Cheltenham Town was terminated by mutual consent.)
25 July 2016	LW	(England)	Sanmi Odelusi	Rochdale	20 January 2017	(Note: On 20 January 2017, Sanmi Odelusi's season-long loan was terminated.)
10 August 2016	LB	(England)	Andrew Taylor	Bolton Wanderers	End of Season	
12 August 2016	GK	(Wales)	Owen Evans	Rhyl	1 January 2017	
31 August 2016	LW	(England)	Ryan Colclough	Milton Keynes Dons	1 January 2017	(Note: On 1 January 2017, Ryan Colclough was recalled from his loan spell at Milton Keynes Dons.)
31 August 2016	CB	(Scotland)	Jack Hendry	Milton Keynes Dons	3 January 2017	
31 August 2016	CM	(Egypt)	Sam Morsy	Barnsley	1 January 2017	
9 January 2017	RB	(England)	Nathan Byrne	Charlton Athletic	End of Season	
12 January 2017	GK	(England)	Dan Lavercombe	Rhyl	End of Season	
20 January 2017	LW	(England)	Sanmi Odelusi	Blackpool	End of Season	
20 January 2017	CM	(England)	Danny Whitehead	Macclesfield Town	End of Season	
20 January 2017	CF	(England)	Sam Cosgrove	North Ferriby United	End of Season	
21 January 2017	SS	(England)	Kaiyne Woolery	Forest Green Rovers	End of Season	
30 January 2017	CM	(England)	Jordan Flores	Blackpool	End of Season	
30 January 2017	MF	(England)	Danny O'Brien	Chester	10 April 2017	
31 January 2017	CF	(Northern Ireland)	Billy Mckay	Inverness Caledonian Thistle	End of Season	
11 February 2017	CB	(Northern Ireland)	Jack White	Skelmersdale United	End of Season	
11 February 2017	CF	(England)	Nathan Randell	Skelmersdale United	End of Season	
15 February 2017	RB	(England)	Luke Burke	Barrow	18 March 2017	
1 April 2017	GK	(Wales)	Owen Evans	North Ferriby United	End of Season	

== Competitions ==
=== Pre-season friendlies ===
9 July 2016	Braga	0–0	Wigan Athletic
18:30		Report		Attendance: 351

13 July 2016	Chester	0–0	Wigan Athletic	Chester
19:30		Report		Stadium: Deva Stadium; Attendance: 500 (200 away)

16 July 2016	Wigan Athletic	0–2	Manchester United	Wigan
13:30		Report	Keane 49'; Pereira 58'	Stadium: DW Stadium; Attendance: 13,314

17 July 2016	Wigan Athletic	0–2	Liverpool	Wigan
16:00			Ings 71'; Woodburn 74'	Stadium: DW Stadium; Attendance: 18,426

20 July 2016	Macclesfield Town	0–0	Wigan Athletic	Macclesfield
19:00		Report		Stadium: Moss Rose

23 July 2016	Rochdale	4–1	Wigan Athletic	Rochdale
15:00	Noble-Lazarus 26'; Mendez-Laing 31'; Canavan 79'; Andrew 82'	Report	Wildschut 77'	Stadium: Spotland Stadium

26 July 2016	Oldham Athletic	0–1	Wigan Athletic	Oldham
19:30 GMT		Report	Jacobs 77'	Stadium: Boundary Park

29 July 2016	Fleetwood Town	3–4	Wigan Athletic	Fleetwood
19:45	Ball 7', 50'; B. Grant 55'	Report	Power 11'; Burke 35'; Wildschut 37'; Jacobs 52'	Stadium: Highbury Stadium; Attendance: 1,717

=== Season summary ===
Games played	46 (43 Championship, 2 FA Cup, 1 League Cup)
Games won	11 (10 Championship, 1 FA Cup, 0 League Cup)
Games drawn	10 (10 Championship, 0 FA Cup, 0 League Cup)
Games lost	25 (23 Championship, 1 FA Cup, 1League Cup)
Goals scored	42 (39 Championship, 2 FA Cup, 1 League Cup)
Goals conceded	60 (54 Championship, 4 FA Cup, 2 League Cup)
Goal difference	-19
Clean sheets	13 (12 Championship, 1 FA Cup, 0 League Cup)
Yellow cards	88 (83 Championship, 5 FA Cup, 0 League Cup)
Red cards	1 (0 Championship, 0 FA Cup, 1 League Cup)
Best result	3–0 vs Blackburn Rovers (13 Aug 16)
Worst result	0–4 vs Manchester United (29 Jan 17)
Most appearances	Stephen Warnock (45)
Top scorer	Will Grigg (7)
Points	40

=== Championship ===
==== League table ====
Pos	Team	Pld	W	D	L	GF	GA	GD	Pts	Promotion, qualification or relegation
20	Burton Albion	46	13	13	20	49	63	−14	52	
21	Nottingham Forest	46	14	9	23	62	72	−10	51	
22	Blackburn Rovers (R)	46	12	15	19	53	65	−12	51	Relegation to EFL League One
23	Wigan Athletic (R)	46	10	12	24	40	57	−17	42	Relegation to EFL League One
24	Rotherham United (R)	46	5	8	33	40	98	−58	23	Relegation to EFL League One

Source: English Football League, Soccerway
Rules for classification: 1) Points; 2) Goal difference; 3) Number of goals scored; 4) Points in head-to-head matches; 5) Goal difference in head-to-head matches; 6) Goals scored in head-to-head matches; 7) Play-off.
(R) Relegated

==== Result by round ====
Round	1	2	3	4	5	6	7	8	9	10	11	12	13	14	15	16	17	18	19	20	21	22	23	24	25	26	27	28	29	30	31	32	33	34	35	36	37	38	39	40	41	42	43	44	45	46
Ground	A	H	H	A	H	A	A	H	A	H	A	H	A	H	A	H	A	A	H	A	H	H	A	A	H	A	H	H	H	A	A	H	A	H	A	A	H	H	A	A	H	H	A	H	A	H
Result	L	W	D	L	L	L	L	D	L	W	D	D	D	L	W	L	D	W	L	L	L	L	L	D	L	W	W	L	D	L	W	D	L	D	L	W	L	L	L	L	W	W	D	D	L	D
Position	19	10	10	16	20	21	23	22	22	21	21	22	22	23	22	22	23	22	23	23	23	23	23	23	23	23	21	22	23	23	22	22	22	22	23	23	23	23	23	23	23	22	23	23	23	23

Updated to match(es) played on 7 May 2017. Source: Statto.com
A = Away; H = Home; W = Win; D = Draw; L = Loss

==== Matches ====
6 August 2016 1	Bristol City	2–1	Wigan Athletic	Bristol
15:00 BST	Abraham 81'; Reid 90'; Tomlin (yellow card) 90+5'	Report	Morgan (yellow card) 27'; Gilbey 32'; Burn (yellow card) 71'; Perkins (yellow card) 72'; Daniels (yellow card) 79'	Stadium: Ashton Gate Stadium

13 August 2016 2	Wigan Athletic	3–0	Blackburn Rovers	Wigan
15:00 BST	Grigg 14'; Perkins (yellow card) 33'; Powell 33'; Gilbey (yellow card) 48'; Duffy 63' (o.g.)	Report	Lowe (yellow card) 33'; Duffy (yellow card) 35'; Greer (yellow card) 45+1'	Stadium: DW Stadium; Attendance: 12,216; Referee: Graham Scott

16 August 2016 3	Wigan Athletic	1–1	Birmingham City	Wigan
19:45 BST	Bodgán (yellow card) 43'; Power (yellow card) 44'; Morgan (yellow card) 49'; Davies 90'	Report	Davis 44' (yellow card) 64'; Donaldson (yellow card) 75'; Grounds (yellow card) 90+2'	Stadium: DW Stadium; Attendance: 11,182

20 August 2016 4	Nottingham Forest	4–3	Wigan Athletic	West Bridgford
15:00 BST	Assombalonga 6'; Cash (yellow card) 9'; Burke 53', 78'; Cohen (yellow card) 58'; Lam (yellow card) 68' (goal) 90+2'; Henderson (yellow card) 90+6'	Report	Jacobs 11' (yellow card) 75'; Wildschut (yellow card) 57'; Grigg 65', 86' (yellow card) 90+1'; Morgan (yellow card) 72'	Stadium: City Ground; Attendance: 17,750 (980 away)

27 August 2016 5	Wigan Athletic	0–1	Queens Park Rangers	Wigan
15:00 BST	Powell (yellow card) 43'; MacDonald (yellow card) 51'; Jacobs (yellow card) 66'; Morgan (yellow card) 82'	Report	Cousins (yellow card) 13'; Bidwell (yellow card) 38'; Henry (yellow card) 42'; Onuoha 48'	Stadium: DW Stadium; Attendance: 10,606 (768 away)

10 September 2016 6	Sheffield Wednesday	2–1	Wigan Athletic	Sheffield
15:00 BST	Fletcher 29'; Forestieri (yellow card) 34' (goal) 62'	Report	Power (yellow card) 3'; Grigg 5'; Garbutt (yellow card) 23'; Jacobs (yellow card) 73'	Stadium: Hillsborough Stadium; Attendance: 24,860 (650 away)

13 September 2016 7	Norwich City	2–1	Wigan Athletic	Norwich
19:45 BST	Jacob Murphy 3', 11'; Howson (yellow card) 63'; Martin (yellow card) 77'	Report	MacDonald (yellow card) 17'; Gilbey (yellow card) 27'; Power (yellow card) 55'; Jordi Gómez 72'	Stadium: Carrow Road

17 September 2016 8	Wigan Athletic	0–0	Fulham	Wigan
15:00 BST	Jacobs (yellow card) 59'	Report	Odoi (yellow card) 51'	Stadium: The DW Stadium

23 September 2016 9	Preston North End	1–0	Wigan Athletic	Preston
19:45 BST	Hugill 7'; Cunningham (yellow card) 30'; Browne (yellow card) 75'	Report	Burn (yellow card) 45+1'; Perkins (yellow card) 67'	Stadium: Deepdale Stadium; Attendance: 13,077

27 September 2016 10	Wigan Athletic	2–1	Wolverhampton Wanderers	Wigan
19:45 BST	Le Fondre 5'; Jordi Gómez (yellow card) 34'; MacDonald (yellow card) 44'; Grigg 88'; Powell (yellow card) 90+2'	Report	Oniangué 34' (yellow card) 71'; Sílvio (yellow card) 41'; Saïss (yellow card) 53'	Stadium: The DW Stadium; Attendance: 10,723; Referee: Tony Harrington

1 October 2016 11	Brentford	0–0	Wigan Athletic	Brentford
15:00 BST	McCormack (yellow card) 36'; Dean (yellow card) 85'; Egan (yellow card) 90+4'	Report	Buxton (yellow card) 40'; Warnock (yellow card) 74'; Powell (yellow card) 90+3'	Stadium: Griffin Park; Attendance: 9,547; Referee: Andy Woolmer

15 October 2016 12	Wigan Athletic	0–0	Burton Albion	Wigan
15:00 BST		Report	Akins (yellow card) 54'; Brayford (yellow card) 59'; McFadzean (yellow card) 64'	Stadium: The DW Stadium; Attendance: 10,430; Referee: Andrew Davies

18 October 2016 13	Leeds United	1–1	Wigan Athletic	Leeds
19:45 BST	Wood 29'	Report	MacDonald 90+1'	Stadium: Elland Road; Attendance: 19,861; Referee: Peter Bankes

22 October 2016 14	Wigan Athletic	0–1	Brighton & Hove Albion	Wigan
15:00 BST	Power (yellow card) 89'; Le Fondre (yellow card) 90+1'	Report	Stephens 68' (yellow card) 90'	Stadium: The DW Stadium; Attendance: 10,430; Referee: Simon Hooper

29 October 2016 15	Cardiff City	0–1	Wigan Athletic	Cardiff
15:00 BST		Report	Jordi Gómez 86'	Stadium: Cardiff City Stadium; Attendance: 15,969; Referee: Oliver Langford

5 November 2016 16	Wigan Athletic	0–3	Reading	Wigan
15:00 GMT	MacDonald (yellow card) 45+1'; Power (yellow card) 62'; Perkins (yellow card) 69'	Report	McCleary 1', 5'; McShane (yellow card) 33'; Kermorgant 63' (pen.); Blackett (yellow card) 75'	Stadium: The DW Stadium; Attendance: 10,277; Referee: David Coote

19 November 2016 17	Barnsley	0–0	Wigan Athletic	Barnsley
15:00 GMT		Report	MacDonald (yellow card) 43'; Morgan (yellow card) 71'	Stadium: Oakwell Stadium; Attendance: 12,181; Referee: Jeremy Simpson

28 November 2016 18	Huddersfield Town	1–2	Wigan Athletic	Huddersfield
19:45 GMT	Hogg (yellow card) 18'; Mooy 50'; Smith (yellow card) 71'	Report	Warnock (yellow card) 3'; Burke 40'; Power (yellow card) 52'; Wildschut 60'; Garbutt (yellow card) 90+3'	Stadium: The John Smith's Stadium; Attendance: 18,943; Referee: Tony Harrington

3 December 2016 19	Wigan Athletic	0–1	Derby County	Wigan
15:00 GMT	Perkins (yellow card) 45+1'	Report	Olsson (yellow card) 10'; Johnson 16' (yellow card) 38'; Hughes (yellow card) 85'	Stadium: The DW Stadium; Attendance: 12,526; Referee: Andrew Madley

10 December 2016 20	Aston Villa	1–0	Wigan Athletic	Birmingham
15:00 GMT	Hutton (yellow card) 83'; Grealish (yellow card) 86' (goal) 88'	Report	Garbutt (yellow card) 12'; Gómez (yellow card) 64'; Perkins (yellow card) 79'; MacDonald (yellow card) 90+3'	Stadium: Villa Park; Attendance: 29,392; Referee: James Linington

14 December 2016 21	Wigan Athletic	0–2	Newcastle United	Wigan
19:45 GMT		Report	Diamé 26'; Hayden (yellow card) 32'; Atsu 78'	Stadium: The DW Stadium; Attendance: 14,562; Referee: Simon Hooper

17 December 2016 22	Wigan Athletic	2–3	Ipswich Town	Wigan
15:00 GMT	Wildschut 35', 62'; Kellett (yellow card) 44'; Burn (yellow card) 45+1'; Jääskeläinen (yellow card) 45+3'	Report	Pitman 7' (pen.), 68' (yellow card) 13'; Dozzell (yellow card) 15'; McGoldrick 88'; Lawrence (yellow card) 90+3'	Stadium: The DW Stadium; Attendance: 10,071; Referee: Keith Stroud

26 December 2016 23	Rotherham United	3–2	Wigan Athletic	Rotherham
15:00 GMT	Belaïd 8' (yellow card) 36'; Mattock (yellow card) 20'; Ward (yellow card) 25' (goal) 32'; Fisher (yellow card) 45'; Burn 45+1' (o.g.)	Report	Davies (yellow card) 31'; Wildschut 51'; Gómez 79'; Jacobs (yellow card) 90+1'	Stadium: AESSEAL New York Stadium; Attendance: 10,158; Referee: David Coote

31 December 2016 24	Derby County	0–0	Wigan Athletic	Derby
15:00 GMT	Johnson (yellow card) 57'; Hughes (yellow card) 87'	Report		Stadium: iPro Stadium; Attendance: 28,289; Referee: Geoff Eltringham

2 January 2017 25	Wigan Athletic	0–1	Huddersfield Town	Wigan
15:00 GMT	Jacobs (yellow card) 68'	Report	Billing (yellow card) 12'; Mooy (yellow card) 45+2'; Holmes-Dennis (yellow card) 55'; Stanković (yellow card) 77'; Wells 80'	Stadium: The DW Stadium; Attendance: 13,480; Referee: Jeremy Simpson

14 January 2017 26	Burton Albion	0–2	Wigan Athletic	Burton-upon-Trent
15:00 GMT	Sordell (yellow card) 33'; Ward (yellow card) 69'	Report	Connolly 45+1', 64' (yellow card) 77'; Buxton (yellow card) 57'; Flores (yellow card) 81'	Stadium: Pirelli Stadium; Attendance: 4,411; Referee: Andrew Madley

21 January 2017 27	Wigan Athletic	2–1	Brentford	Wigan
15:00 GMT	Morsy 28'; Dean 32' (o.g.); MacDonald (yellow card) 36'	Report	Jota 86'	Stadium: The DW Stadium; Attendance: 10,244; Referee: James Adcock

3 February 2017 28	Wigan Athletic	0–1	Sheffield Wednesday	Wigan
19:45 GMT	Morsy (yellow card) 85'	Report	Wallace 43'; Hunt (yellow card) 62'	Stadium: The DW Stadium; Attendance: 13,037; Referee: Steve Martin

7 February 2017 29	Wigan Athletic	2–2	Norwich City	Wigan
19:45 GMT	Grigg (yellow card) 48'; Bogle 62', 68'; Morsy (yellow card) 90'	Report	Oliveira 40'; Martin (yellow card) 48'; Dijks 73'; Pinto (yellow card) 86'	Stadium: DW Stadium; Attendance: 10,193; Referee: Peter Bankes

11 February 2017 30	Fulham	3–2	Wigan Athletic	Fulham, London
15:00 GMT	Aluko (yellow card) 21'; Ayité 25'; Odoi 71'; Kebano 90+3'	Report	Malone 32' (o.g.); Jacobs 45+1'; Burn (yellow card) 61'; Connolly (yellow card) 70'	Stadium: Craven Cottage; Attendance: 15,552; Referee: David Coote

14 February 2017 31	Wolverhampton Wanderers	0–1	Wigan Athletic	Wolverhampton
19:45 GMT	Enobakhare (yellow card) 49'; Weimann (yellow card) 83'	Report	Burn (yellow card) 73'; Buxton 88'; Morsy (yellow card) 90+1'	Stadium: Molineux Stadium; Attendance: 17,156; Referee: Simon Hooper

18 February 2017 32	Wigan Athletic	0–0	Preston North End	Wigan
15:00 GMT		Report	McGeady (yellow card) 36'; Browning (yellow card) 43'	Stadium: DW Stadium; Attendance: 15,117; Referee: Chris Kavanagh

21 February 2017 33	Queens Park Rangers	2–1	Wigan Athletic	Shepherd's Bush, London
19:45 GMT	Smith 4'; Lynch (yellow card) 15'; Washington 60'; Sylla (yellow card) 76'	Report	Bogle 17' (pen.) (yellow card) 22'; Grigg (yellow card) 30'; Power (yellow card) 35'; Hanson (yellow card) 46'; Buxton (yellow card) 61'	Stadium: Loftus Road; Attendance: 12,101; Referee: James Linington

25 February 2017 34	Wigan Athletic	0–0	Nottingham Forest	Wigan
15:00 GMT	Buxton (yellow card) 38'	Report	Vaughan (yellow card) 70'	Stadium: DW Stadium; Attendance: 11,254; Referee: Geoff Eltringham

4 March 2017 35	Blackburn Rovers	1–0	Wigan Athletic	Blackburn
15:00 GMT	Emnes 58'; Mulgrew (yellow card) 69'	Report	Morsy (yellow card) 87'	Stadium: Ewood Park; Attendance: 13,165; Referee: Jeremy Simpson

7 March 2017 36	Birmingham City	0–1	Wigan Athletic	Birmingham
19:45 GMT	Keita (yellow card) 88'	Report	Burn 19'; Perkins (yellow card) 62'	Stadium: St Andrew's; Attendance: 15,596; Referee: Scott Duncan

11 March 2017 37	Wigan Athletic	0–1	Bristol City	Wigan
15:00 GMT	Gilbey (yellow card) 45+1'; Connolly (yellow card) 57'	Report	Pack (yellow card) 27'; Flint 88'	Stadium: DW Stadium; Attendance: 10,787; Referee: Andrew Madley

18 March 2017 38	Wigan Athletic	0–2	Aston Villa	Wigan
15:00 GMT	Hanson (yellow card) 23'	Report	Hourihane (yellow card) 42'; Chester 73'; Lansbury (yellow card) 75'; Hogan 84'	Stadium: DW Stadium; Attendance: 14,811; Referee: Tony Harrington

1 April 2017 39	Newcastle United	2–1	Wigan Athletic	Newcastle
15:00 BST	Diamé (yellow card) 17'; Gayle 36'; Ritchie 57'	Report	Burn (yellow card) 29'; Morsy (yellow card) 39'; Jacobs 50'	Stadium: St James' Park; Attendance: 51,849; Referee: David Coote

4 April 2017 40	Ipswich Town	3–0	Wigan Athletic	Ipswich
19:45 BST	McGoldrick 22'; Sears 30', 85'; Kenlock (yellow card) 55'; Diagouraga (yellow card) 60'; Ward (yellow card) 68'	Report	Burn (yellow card) 59'; Power (yellow card) 81'	Stadium: Portman Road; Attendance: 14,661; Referee: Andy Davies

8 April 2017 41	Wigan Athletic	3–2	Rotherham United	Wigan
15:00 BST	Obertan 34'; Gilbey 65'; Powell (yellow card) 90+5' (goal) 90+6'	Report	Ward 29'; Forde 61'; Fisher (yellow card) 83'; Price (yellow card) 90+5'	Stadium: DW Stadium; Attendance: 10,085; Referee: Scott Duncan

13 April 2017 42	Wigan Athletic	3–2	Barnsley	Wigan
19:45 BST	MacDonald (yellow card) 45'; Powell 71', 72', 82' (pen.); Burn (yellow card) 78'; Hanson (yellow card) 90'	Report	Armstrong 42'; Watkins (yellow card) 49'; Janko (yellow card) 53'; Kent 59'; Jones (yellow card) 76'; MacDonald (yellow card) 78'	Stadium: DW Stadium; Attendance: 10,838; Referee: Simon Hooper

17 April 2017 43	Brighton & Hove Albion	2–1	Wigan Athletic	Falmer, Brighton
15:00 BST	Murray 37'; Knockaert (yellow card) 51'; March 65'	Report	Powell 85'	Stadium: Falmer Stadium; Attendance: 29,940; Referee: James Linington

22 April 2017 44	Wigan Athletic	0–0	Cardiff City	Wigan
15:00 BST		Report	Halford (yellow card) 87'	Stadium: DW Stadium; Attendance: 10,875; Referee: Oliver Langford

29 April 2017 45	Reading	1–0	Wigan Athletic	Reading
15:00 BST	Kermorgant 6'; Evans (yellow card) 13'; Moore (yellow card) 45+3'; Gunter (yellow card) 51'; Williams (yellow card) 64'; Kelly (yellow card) 87'	Report	Connolly (yellow card) 50'	Stadium: Madejski Stadium; Attendance: 19,177; Referee: Tim Robinson

7 May 2017 46	Wigan Athletic	1–1	Leeds United	Wigan
12:00 BST	Tunnicliffe 6'; Burn (yellow card) 24'	Report	Green (yellow card) 25'; Bartley (yellow card) 39'; Wood 50' (pen.)	Stadium: DW Stadium; Attendance: 15,280; Referee: Scott Duncan

=== FA Cup ===
7 January 2017 Third round	Wigan Athletic	2–0	Nottingham Forest	Wigan
15:00 GMT	MacDonald (yellow card) 13'; Jacobs (yellow card) 36'; Grigg 45+2'; Wildschut 57'; Flores (yellow card) 90+1'; Power (yellow card) 90+2'	Report	Hobbs (yellow card) 6'; Lichaj (penalty missed) 81'; Pereira (yellow card) 90+2'	Stadium: The DW Stadium; Attendance: 5,163; Referee: Oliver Langford

29 January 2017 Fourth round	Manchester United	4–0	Wigan Athletic	Manchester
16:00 GMT	Fellaini 44'; Smalling 57'; Mkhitaryan 74'; Schweinsteiger 81'	Report	Burn (yellow card) 55'	Stadium: Old Trafford; Attendance: 75,229; Referee: Neil Swarbrick

=== EFL Cup ===
9 August 2016 First round	Oldham Athletic	2–1	Wigan Athletic	Oldham
19:45 BST	Flynn 18'; Klok (yellow card) 41'; Law 83'	Report	Grigg 34'; Buxton (red card) 45+2'	Stadium: Boundary Park

== Squad statistics ==
=== Appearances ===
Last updated: 6 August 2016.

No.	Pos.	Name	League		FA Cup		League Cup		Total	
No.	Pos.	Name	Apps	Goals	Apps	Goals	Apps	Goals	Apps	Goals
Goalkeepers
1	GK	(Hungary) Ádám Bogdán	17	0	0	0	0	0	17	0
22	GK	(Finland) Jussi Jääskeläinen	8+1	0	0	0	1	0	9+1	0
35	GK	(Scotland) Matt Gilks	0	0	0	0	0	0	0	0
Defenders
2	LB	(England) Reece James	0	0	0	0	0	0	0	0
3	DF	(England) Jake Buxton	24	0	2	0	1	0	27	0
5	CB	(England) Donervon Daniels	0+1	0	0	0	1	0	1+1	0
12	RB	(England) Callum Connolly	3	2	0	1	0	0	4	2
13	DF	(England) Andy Kellett	3+1	0	0	0	0	0	3+1	0
20	CB	(Wales) Craig Morgan	9+4	0	0	0	0	0	9+4	0
21	CB	(England) Alex Bruce	0	0	0	0	0	0	0	0
23	DF	(England) Stephen Warnock	27	0	2	0	1	0	30	0
24	DF	(Scotland) Jack Hendry	0	0	0	0	0	0	0	0
29	DF	(England) Luke Burke	4+1	0	0	0	0	0	4+1	0
32	DF	(England) Reece Burke	7	1	0	0	0	0	7	1
33	DF	(England) Dan Burn	21+3	0	2	0	0	0	23+3	0
44	CB	(England) Sam Stubbs	0	0	0	0	0	0	0	0
Midfielders
4	CM	(England) David Perkins	17+1	0	1	0	1	0	19+1	0
6	RM	(England) Max Power	27	0	2	0	1	0	30	0
7	MF	(England) Alex Gilbey	8	1	0	0	0	0	8	1
8	MF	(England) Sam Morsy	3	1	2	0	0	0	5	1
16	MF	(Wales) Shaun MacDonald	20+2	1	2	0	0	0	22+2	1
17	RW	(England) Michael Jacobs	24+4	1	2	0	1	0	27+4	1
19	MF	(England) Ryan Tunnicliffe	0+1	0	0+1	0	0	0	0+2	0
25	MF	(England) Nick Powell	9+6	1	1	0	0	0	10+6	1
26	MF	(England) Jamie Hanson	0	0	0	0	0	0	0	0
31	MF	(Republic of Ireland) Jack Byrne	0	0	0	0	0	0	0	0
37	MF	(England) Josh Laurent	0	0	0	0	0	0	0	0
42	MF	(England) Josh Gregory	0	0	0	0	0	0	0	0
43	MF	(England) Marcus Browne	0	0	0+1	0	0	0	0+1	0
47	MF	(England) James Weir	0+1	0	0	0	0	0	0+1	0
Attackers
9	ST	(Northern Ireland) Will Grigg	21+5	6	2	0	1	1	24+5	7
11	FW	(France) Gabriel Obertan	0	0	0	0	0	0	0	0
14	FW	(England) Omar Bogle	0+1	0	0	0	0	0	0+1	0
27	FW	(England) Ryan Colclough	0+2	0	0	0	1	0	1+2	0
30	FW	(England) James Barrigan	0	0	0	0	0+1	0	0+1	0
39	FW	(France) Mikael Mandron	0	0	0	0	0	0	0	0
Left club during season
-	MF	(England) Tim Chow	0+1	0	0	0	1	0	1+1	0
-	LB	(England) Luke Garbutt	7+1	0	0	0	0	0	7+1	0
-	ST	(Wales) Craig Davies	1+13	1	0	0	0	0	1+13	1
-	MF	(England) Nathan Byrne	7+7	0	0	0	0	0	7+7	0
-	GK	(England) Dan Lavercombe	0	0	0	0	0	0	0	0
-	MF	(England) Danny Whitehead	0	0	0	0	0	0	0	0
-	SS	(England) Kaiyne Woolery	0+1	0	0	0	0	0	0+1	0
-	RB	(England) Kyle Knoyle	0+1	0	0	0	0	0	0+1	0
-	FW	(England) Sam Cosgrove	0	0	0	0	0	0	0	0
-	MF	(Spain) Jordi Gómez	12+3	3	0+1	0	0	0	12+4	3
-	FW	(England) Adam Le Fondre	3+9	1	0+1	0	0	0	3+10	1
-	MF	(England) Jordan Flores	0+2	0	0+1	0	1	0	1+3	0
-	MF	(England) Danny O'Brien	0	0	0	0	0+1	0	0+1	0
-	MF	(Netherlands) Yanic Wildschut	19+6	5	1+1	0	0	0	20+7	5
-	GK	(Denmark) Jakob Haugaard	3	0	2	0	0	0	5	0

=== Top scorers ===
Rank.	Pos.	No.	Name	Championship	FA Cup	League Cup	Total
Rank.	Pos.	No.	Name	Goals	Goals	Goals	Goals
1	FW	9	Will Grigg	5	1	1	7
2	MF	25	Nick Powell	6	0	0	6
3	MF	-	Yanic Wildschut	4	1	0	5
4	MF	-	Jordi Gómez	3	0	0	3
4	MF	17	Michael Jacobs	3	0	0	3
4	FW	14	Omar Bogle	3	0	0	3
5	DF	12	Callum Connolly	2	0	0	2
5	MF	7	Alex Gilbey	2	0	0	2
6	DF	32	Reece Burke	1	0	0	1
6	MF	8	Sam Morsy	1	0	0	1
6	MF	16	Shaun MacDonald	1	0	0	1
6	FW	-	Adam Le Fondre	1	0	0	1
6	FW	-	Craig Davies	1	0	0	1
6	DF	33	Dan Burn	1	0	0	1
6	FW	11	Gabriel Obertan	1	0	0	1
6	MF	19	Ryan Tunnicliffe	1	0	0	1
Own goals				3	0	0	3
