= James Barrigan =

English footballer (born 1998)

Personal information
- Date of birth: 25 January 1998 (age 28)
- Place of birth: Liverpool, England
- Position: Midfielder

Youth career
- –2015: Wigan Athletic

Senior career*
Years	Team	Apps	(Gls)
2016–2018	Wigan Athletic	0	(0)
2017	→ Warrington Town (loan)	5	(1)
2018–2019	Chorley	0	(0)
2018–2019	→ Skelmersdale (loan)	10	(1)
2019–2022	Marine	63	(8)
2022–2023	Warrington Rylands		
2022–2023	Marine (loan)	17	(3)
2023	Marine	4	(0)
- * Club domestic league appearances and goals as of 15:17, 4 May 2023 (UTC)

James Barrigan (born 25 January 1998) is an English footballer who plays as a midfielder, most recently for Marine.

== Club career ==
Ahead of the 2016–17 EFL Championship season he signed a professional contract with the senior team.

Barrigan made his senior team debut in an EFL Cup match against Oldham Athletic as a 70th-minute substitute for Will Grigg.

Wigan offered to elongate his contract by one year in April 2017.

In 2019, he joined Marine and he was appointed vice-captain of the club in December 2021.

He left Marine for Warrington Rylands in the summer of 2022 but rejoined Marine on loan in September 2022. He then signed permanently for Marine again in February 2023 and left in May 2023.

== Career statistics ==
As of match played 26 September 2017

Appearances and goals by club, season and competition
Club	Season	League			FA Cup		League Cup		Other		Total	
Club	Season	Division	Apps	Goals	Apps	Goals	Apps	Goals	Apps	Goals	Apps	Goals
Wigan Athletic	2016–17	Championship	0	0	0	0	1	0	—		1	0
Wigan Athletic	2017–18	League One	0	0	0	0	0	0	1 (Note: Appearance in the EFL Trophy)	0	1	0
Career total			0	0	0	0	1	0	1	0	2	0
