= Sam Morsy =

Egypt international footballer (born 1991)

Sam Morsy سَام مُرْسِيّ
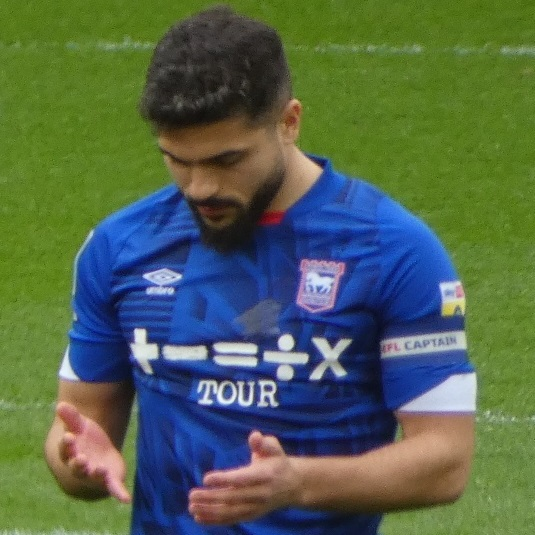
- Morsy with Ipswich Town in 2023

Personal information
- Full name: Samy Sayed Mekkawy Saied Morsy
- Date of birth: 10 September 1991 (age 35)
- Place of birth: Wolverhampton, England
- Height: 5 ft 9 in (1.75 m)
- Position: Defensive midfielder

Team information
- Current team: Blackburn Rovers
- Number: 8

Youth career
- 1999–2008: Wolverhampton Wanderers
- 2008–2009: Port Vale

Senior career*
Years	Team	Apps	(Gls)
2009–2013	Port Vale	71	(4)
2013–2016	Chesterfield	99	(7)
2016–2020	Wigan Athletic	155	(8)
2016–2017	→ Barnsley (loan)	14	(0)
2020–2021	Middlesbrough	34	(1)
2021–2025	Ipswich Town	153	(11)
2025	Kuwait SC	3	(0)
2026	Bristol City	18	(1)
2026–	Blackburn Rovers	12	(0)

International career
2016–2023	Egypt	9	(0)
- * Club domestic league appearances and goals as of 16:01, 24 October 2026 (UTC)

Samy Sayed Mekkawy Saied Morsy (Arabic: سَامِي سَيِّد مَكَّاوِيّ سَعِيد مُرْسِيّ; born 10 September 1991) is a professional footballer who plays as a defensive midfielder for EFL Championship club Blackburn Rovers. Born and raised in England, he has gained nine caps for the Egypt national team.

Morsy joined the Port Vale youth team set-up in 2008, having been released from the Wolverhampton Wanderers Academy. He made his debut for Port Vale in February 2010 and turned professional at the club in the summer. He established himself in the first-team picture in 2010–11, after which he was given a two-year contract. He helped the club to secure promotion out of League Two in 2012–13. He joined Chesterfield in July 2013 and played for the club in the 2014 final of the Football League Trophy, helping them to win the League Two title in 2013–14.

He was sold to Wigan Athletic in January 2016 and helped the club to win the League One title in 2015–16. He joined Barnsley on loan in August 2016, and Wigan were relegated from the Championship upon his return to the club. However, he became a key first-team player as they secured an immediate return by winning the League One title again in 2017–18. He was named as Wigan's Player of the Year for the 2019–20 campaign and joined Middlesbrough in September 2020 following administration and relegation at Wigan. He was sold to Ipswich Town in August 2021, helping the club secure promotion out of League One at the end of the 2022–23 campaign and captaining the team into the Premier League the following year. He left England to join Kuwait SC for a brief spell in July 2025 and returned to England with Bristol City in January 2026. He joined Blackburn Rovers in August 2026.

== Early and personal life ==
Morsy was born on 10 September 1991 in Wolverhampton. His father, Mekawy, came from Egypt and met his mother, Karen, in England. They met while working in a pizza shop and went on to build a property portfolio together. Morsy is a Muslim who observes Ramadan.

== Club career ==
=== Port Vale ===
Morsy was born in Wolverhampton, West Midlands. He was at the Wolverhampton Wanderers Academy for nine years until 2008, when coach Tony Lacey deemed a 16-year-old Morsy to be unworthy of a youth team contract. Morsy later acknowledged his focus and attitude was not correct at that age, which prevented him from playing to his potential. Spotted by Port Vale Youth Development Officer Bill Chetwyn, he was taken to Vale Park for a trial, and was handed a place in the Vale youth team after impressing both Mark Grew and Andy Porter.

"He is going to be a good midfield player, there is no question about that. After scoring two against Tranmere, I thought he showed what a good player he is in this game. Maybe he has too many touches at times and gives the ball away, but he keeps wanting it and he wants to learn."

— Mark Grew speaking of Morsy in September 2008.

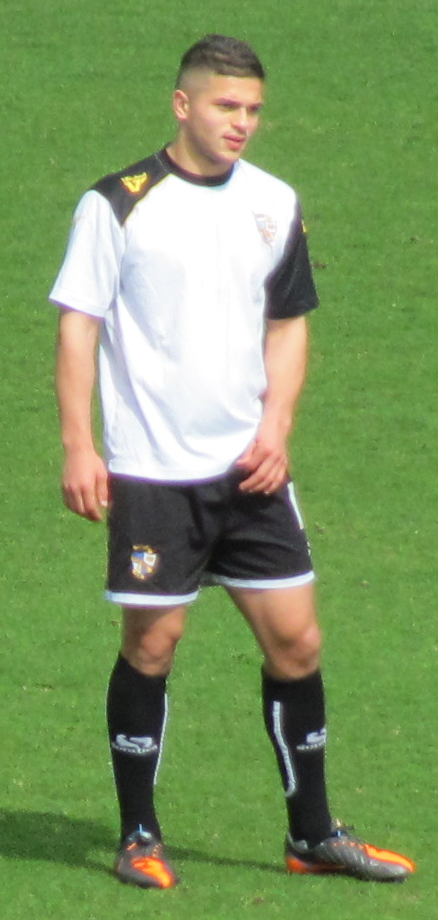
Morsy warming up for Port Vale in 2013

By the start of the 2009–10 season, he was being included in the senior squad, being placed on the bench for the League Cup clash with Sheffield United at Bramall Lane. He made his debut on 23 February, replacing Tommy Fraser 83 minutes into a 4–0 home league win over Lincoln City. He was offered his first (one year) professional contract at the end of the season, and was also given the Youth Player of the Year award.

In the 2010–11 pre-season, manager Micky Adams was pleased with Morsy's development, having witnessed the youngster score in two successive friendlies. Morsy promised he would not settle for a cameo role in the season, having just a year to prove his worth at the professional level. On 8 January, new manager Jim Gannon gave Morsy an appearance in Vale's 4–2 FA Cup defeat to Championship side Burnley at Turf Moor. He scored his first senior goal on 22 February, in a 3–1 home defeat to Stevenage. Gannon believed Morsy to be "a really talented footballer" with "all the skills you want in a midfielder". One of the few positives of Gannon's short reign, his rise to prominence put him in line to sign an extended contract. A two-year contract was signed on 1 April. He was also awarded the club's Young Player of the Year award.

Finding himself on the bench at the start of the 2011–12 campaign under returning manager Micky Adams, on 3 September he scored his second senior goal just 13 minutes after making his first appearance of the season, in what turned out to be a 3–2 defeat to AFC Wimbledon. After falling out of favour in November, he had to wait another two months until the return fixture with Wimbledon before he started another game, when an injury crisis at the Vale allowed Morsy the chance to deliver "an eye-catching attacking display".

Following the departure of Anthony Griffith, Morsy stepped into the role of 'midfield enforcer' for the 2012–13 campaign. On 25 August, he opened the scoring after just 14 seconds in a 3–1 win over Morecambe at the Globe Arena, earning himself a place on the League Two team of the week. He stated that his aim for the season was "to get more goals", as he formed a "formidable and unshakeable central midfield double act" with Chris Shuker. Following a suspension in October for receiving five yellow cards, Morsy said: "I definitely have to cut down on yellow cards in future". However, a high two-footed tackle on Rochdale's Jason Kennedy resulted in a straight red card for Morsy on 6 November, and was the turning point that resulted in a 2–0 lead for Port Vale becoming a 2–2 draw. Micky Adams fined him two weeks' wages (the maximum fine possible) in punishment, and called him a "coward... [who] went to hurt their lad [Kennedy]". Morsy issued an official apology, but stated that "there was no malice in the challenge". Adams kept him out of the first-team picture for six weeks after the incident, and Morsy stated: "I missed some important matches and that makes you re-evaluate your game." He was more of a bit-part player in the second half of the campaign, as Vale secured promotion with a third-place finish. He rejected the offer of a new two-year contract and left the club.

=== Chesterfield ===
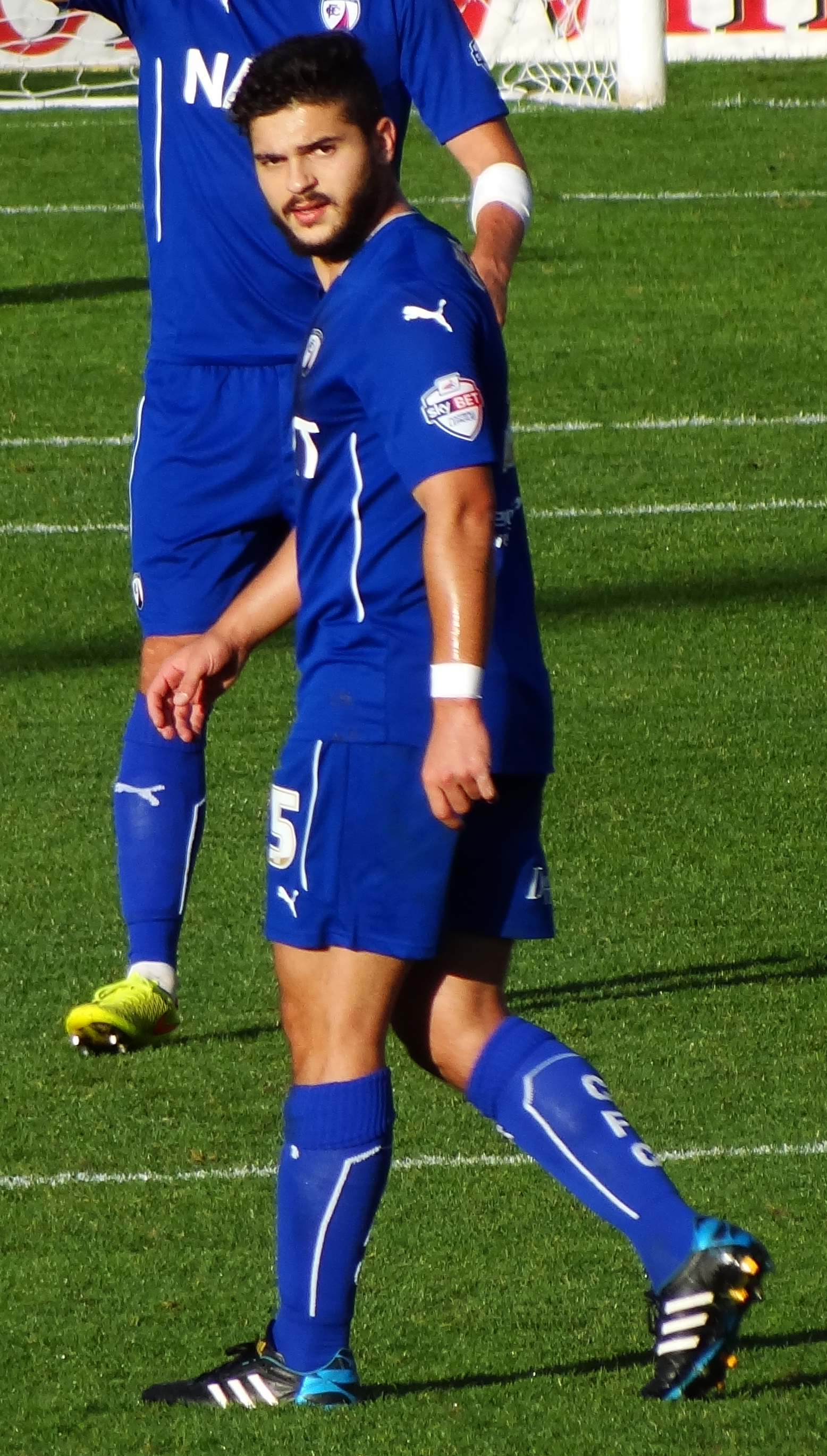
Morsy playing for Chesterfield in October 2014

Morsy agreed to sign a two-year deal with League Two club Chesterfield in July 2013, after a fee had been settled with Port Vale, due to Morsy being under the age of 24. Manager Paul Cook said that "When we found out that he may be available, we moved heaven and earth to get him here." On 30 March 2014, he played at Wembley Stadium in Chesterfield's 3–1 defeat to Peterborough United in the final of the Football League Trophy; he provided the assist for Eoin Doyle's goal after "a powerful run into the Posh box". He played a total of 39 games as Chesterfield won promotion as divisional champions in 2013–14, and at the end of the campaign he was voted the club's Player of the Year.

He captained Chesterfield to the League One play-offs in 2014–15. He was reported to be a target for Cardiff City manager Russell Slade in the summer. Milton Keynes Dons also had a bid of £400,000 turned down by Chesterfield.

=== Wigan Athletic ===
On 28 January 2016, Morsy agreed a two-and-a-half-year deal with Wigan Athletic after being sold for an undisclosed fee (later reported to be £200,000 plus a 10% sell-on clause for any profit Wigan may make on his future transfer). He was named on the Football League team of the week after he "pulled all the strings" in a 2–1 victory at Walsall on 20 February. He scored his first goal for Wigan in a 4–1 win against Swindon Town on 25 March. Wigan went on to win promotion as champions of League One in the 2015–16 season.

On 31 August 2016, he joined Barnsley on loan for the rest of the 2016–17 season. New Wigan manager Warren Joyce activated the release clause of the loan contract in January 2017, but Joyce was pessimistic over his chances of keeping Morsy at the DW Stadium because previous manager Gary Caldwell had agreed a clause that meant Barnsley could purchase Morsy for a set fee upon expiry of the loan. Morsy returned to Wigan and signed a one-year contract extension on 16 January.

He was named team captain in August 2017, with Dan Burn also named "club captain", though it was confirmed Morsy would wear the armband and Burns would deputise in Morsy's absence. Paul Cook led Wigan to a highly successful 2017–18 campaign, with Morsy scoring three goals in 47 appearances as Wigan won promotion as champions of League One for the second time in three seasons. Wigan also made a big impression in the FA Cup, knocking out top-flight sides A.F.C. Bournemouth, West Ham United and Manchester City to reach the quarter-final. Morsy scored in the win over Bournemouth but missed the victory over eventual Premier League champions Manchester City due to suspension.

On 15 September 2018, Morsy was sent off in a 2–0 defeat at Brentford after clashing with Yoann Barbet. However, the red card was rescinded on appeal, and three days later he scored in a 2–1 victory over Hull City. He signed a new two-and-a-half-year deal with Wigan in December. He picked up 14 yellow cards in 40 appearances as Wigan posted an 18th-place finish during the 2018–19 season, and he was also ranked sixth for most completed tackles (112) in the Championship. Despite this, he said it was "the unluckiest season I've ever been involved in... and it's credit to us we've been able to overcome all that and stay in the division." He was linked with moves to both Sheffield Wednesday and Brentford in the summer.

He was nominated for the EFL Championship Player of the Month award for February 2020 after scoring two goals, including the only goal of the game at league leaders West Bromwich Albion, which took Wigan out of the relegation zone. He scored three goals in 44 games during the 2019–20 season, which ended in relegation after Wigan were controversially deducted 12 points after being placed into administration. Morsy was voted as the club's Player of the Year with 42% of the overall vote.

=== Middlesbrough ===
On 11 September 2020, Morsy joined Championship side Middlesbrough on a three-year contract, becoming manager Neil Warnock's third signing of the summer. He made his debut at the Riverside Stadium four days later in a 2–0 defeat to Barnsley in the EFL Cup; after the game first-team coach Ronnie Jepson was encouraged by Morsy's performance and said that "he will give us extra edge". On 16 December, he was sent off for handling the ball during a 1–0 home win over Luton Town. However, Warnock said he would appeal the red card. He scored his first goal for Middlesbrough in a 2–1 loss at Swansea City on 6 March. Injuries limited him to 32 appearances in the 2020–21 season. However, his consistent performances still earned him a 7-out-of-10 rating in the TeessideLive season review. He was sent off in his final appearance at Middlesbrough, during a 1–1 draw with Blackburn Rovers on 28 August 2021.

=== Ipswich Town ===
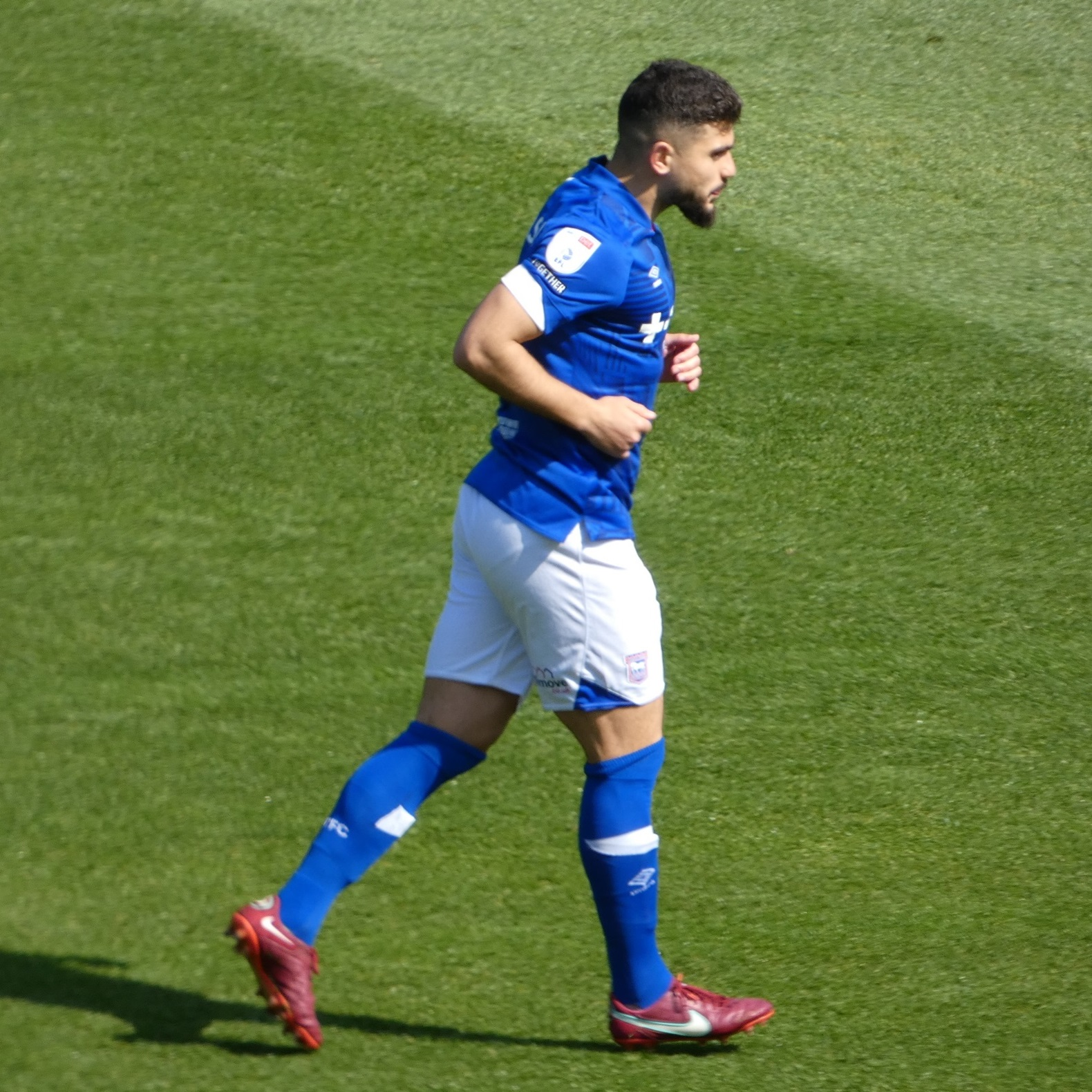
Sam Morsy became Ipswich Town's captain after joining them in August 2021

On 31 August 2021, Morsy joined League One club Ipswich Town on a three-year deal after being signed for an undisclosed fee; arriving as the club's 19th signing of the summer transfer window, it marked the third time he would play under manager Paul Cook. He was named club captain in October 2021. He scored his first goal for Ipswich on 5 March, netting the opening goal in a 2–0 away win against Fleetwood Town. Speaking later that month, new manager Kieran McKenna said that Morsy was forming a good bond with him. McKenna instructed Morsy to get further forward and score more goals. He scored four goals in 49 games in the 2022–23 campaign as Ipswich secured promotion as runners-up to Plymouth Argyle, with the club reaching 98 points and 100 goals. He described the achievement as "absolutely incredible". He was named in the League One PFA Team of the Year, alongside teammates Leif Davis and Conor Chaplin, and was linked with a move to the Saudi Pro League.

Morsy was voted the club's Player of the Month for August 2023 and nominated for the Championship Player of the Month award. He missed just four league games of the 2023–24 season, all due to suspension, as Ipswich secured back-to-back promotions with another second-place finish. He dedicated the promotion to the people of Palestine and credited manager Kieran McKenna for transforming the club's fortunes. He was named as the club's Men's Player of the Year and as PFA Fans' Championship Player of the Year. McKenna praised Morsy for his leadership, performance and fitness level. In July, Morsy signed a new two-year deal with Ipswich, keeping him at Portman Road until 2026.

He scored his first Premier League goal on 21 September, when his added-time equaliser secured a 1–1 draw at Southampton. Morsy was the only Premier League captain not to wear a rainbow-coloured armband during Stonewall's Rainbow Laces campaign, citing religious grounds. Though accepted by fans, his decision caused disappointment with the LGBTQ+ supporters' group Rainbow Tractors, who raised a suggestion of hypocrisy when taking into account that he had previously worn a shirt containing a sponsorship logo related to gambling, which is forbidden by Islam. Speaking after relegation was confirmed in April, Morsy committed his future to the club.

=== Kuwait SC ===
On 24 July 2025, Morsy joined Kuwait Premier League champions Kuwait SC on a free transfer. After three league games and a red card against Al-Arabi, he was released two months into his contract.

=== Bristol City ===
Morsy began training with Wolverhampton Wanderers in November 2025. On 2 January 2026, Morsy signed a six-month contract with Championship club Bristol City. He had been signed by Gerhard Struber, who was replaced by Roy Hodgson in March. On 18 April, Morsy scored his first goal for the club in a 4–2 home defeat to Norwich City. He ended the 2025–26 season with 20 games, scoring one goal, and was released at the end of his contract.

He was part of the 48-man Professional Footballers' Association (PFA) free agent squad in July 2026.

=== Blackburn Rovers ===
On 10 August 2026, Morsy joined Blackburn Rovers on a one-year contract.

== International career ==
Morsy, who was born in England, qualified to represent Egypt as his father is Egyptian. He made his international debut on 30 August 2016 after coming on as a substitute for Mostafa Fathi at half-time in a 1–1 draw with Guinea in a friendly match at Borg El Arab Stadium. He was on the bench as Egypt secured qualification to the 2018 FIFA World Cup with a 2–1 victory over the Congo. In June 2018 he was named in Héctor Cúper's 23-man squad for the 2018 FIFA World Cup in Russia. He made his FIFA World Cup debut in the opening game of the group stage on 15 June, coming on for the injured Tarek Hamed 50 minutes into a 1–0 defeat to Uruguay.

He was recalled to the international set up in September 2021 for World Cup qualifiers against Libya in Cairo and Benghazi. Although he was ultimately left out of the final squad. He was listed in a preliminary squad in May 2022, but was again not named in the final squad. He called up by manager Rui Vitória in August 2023, though missed out two months later. He was reported to have declared himself unavailable for Africa Cup of Nations selection in 2024 after initially being named in the 55-man provisional squad. This was denied by Egyptian Football Association board member Hazem Emam, who said that the decision was down to Vitória. Morsy said in November 2024 that he believed he would not get a call up under manager Hossam Hassan.

== Style of play ==
Morsy is an "enforcer" who "relies on his ability to time tackles and break-up play". After leaving Port Vale in June 2013, assistant manager Mark Grew warned Morsy to improve his disciplinary record and temper his aggression in the future, pointing out that he received nine yellow cards and one red card in the 2012–13 campaign.

== Career statistics ==
=== Club ===
As of match played 24 October 2026

Appearances and goals by club, season and competition
Club	Season	League			National cup (Note: Includes FA Cup, Kuwait Emir Cup)		League cup (Note: Includes Football League Cup, Kuwait Crown Prince Cup)		Other		Total	
Club	Season	Division	Apps	Goals	Apps	Goals	Apps	Goals	Apps	Goals	Apps	Goals
Port Vale	2009–10	League Two	1	0	0	0	0	0	0	0	1	0
Port Vale	2010–11	League Two	16	1	1	0	0	0	0	0	17	1
Port Vale	2011–12	League Two	26	1	2	0	0	0	0	0	28	1
Port Vale	2012–13	League Two	28	2	1	0	1	0	2 (Note: Appearances in EFL Trophy)	0	32	2
Port Vale	Total		71	4	4	0	1	0	2	0	78	4
Chesterfield	2013–14	League Two	34	1	0	0	1	0	4	1	39	2
Chesterfield	2014–15	League One	39	2	6	0	1	0	2 (Note: Appearances in League One play-offs)	0	48	2
Chesterfield	2015–16	League One	26	4	3	1	1	0	0	0	30	5
Chesterfield	Total		99	7	9	1	3	0	6	1	117	9
Wigan Athletic	2015–16	League One	16	1	—		—		—		16	1
Wigan Athletic	2016–17	Championship	15	1	2	0	0	0	—		17	1
Wigan Athletic	2017–18	League One	41	2	6	1	0	0	0	0	47	3
Wigan Athletic	2018–19	Championship	40	1	0	0	0	0	—		40	1
Wigan Athletic	2019–20	Championship	43	3	1	0	0	0	—		44	3
Wigan Athletic	Total		155	8	9	1	0	0	0	0	164	9
Barnsley (loan)	2016–17	Championship	14	0	—		—		—		14	0
Middlesbrough	2020–21	Championship	31	1	0	0	1	0	—		32	1
Middlesbrough	2021–22	Championship	3	0	0	0	1	0	—		4	0
Middlesbrough	Total		34	1	0	0	2	0	0	0	36	1
Ipswich Town	2021–22	League One	34	3	3	0	0	0	1	0	38	3
Ipswich Town	2022–23	League One	44	4	4	0	0	0	1	0	49	4
Ipswich Town	2023–24	Championship	42	3	2	0	0	0	—		44	3
Ipswich Town	2024–25	Premier League	33	1	1	0	0	0	—		34	1
Ipswich Town	Total		153	11	10	0	0	0	2	0	165	11
Kuwait SC	2025–26	Kuwait Premier League	3	0	0	0	0	0	0	0	3	0
Bristol City	2025–26	Championship	18	1	2	0	—		—		20	1
Blackburn Rovers	2026–27	Championship	12	0	0	0	1	0	—		13	0
Career total			559	32	34	2	7	0	10	1	610	35

=== International ===
As of match played 12 September 2023

Appearances and goals by national team and year
National team	Year	Apps	Goals
Egypt	2016	1	0
Egypt	2017	2	0
Egypt	2018	4	0
Egypt	2023	2	0
Total		9	0

== Honours ==
Port Vale

- Football League Two third-place promotion: 2012–13

Chesterfield

- Football League Two: 2013–14
- Football League Trophy runner-up: 2013–14

Wigan Athletic

- Football/EFL League One: 2015–16, 2017–18

Ipswich Town

- EFL Championship second-place promotion: 2023–24
- EFL League One second-place promotion: 2022–23

Kuwait SC

- Kuwaiti Premier League: 2025–26

Individual

- Port Vale Youth Player of the Year: 2009–10
- Port Vale Young Player of the Year: 2010–11
- Chesterfield Player of the Year: 2013–14
- Wigan Athletic Player of the Year: 2019–20
- PFA Team of the Year: 2022–23 League One
- Ipswich Town Player of the Year: 2023–24
- PFA Fans' Championship Player of the Year: 2023–24
