= Víctor Maffeo =

Spanish footballer (born 2000)

Personal information
- Full name: Víctor Alfonso Maffeo Becerra
- Date of birth: 18 September 2000 (age 26)
- Place of birth: Sant Joan Despí, Spain
- Height: 1.70 m (5 ft 7 in)
- Position: Right-back

Team information
- Current team: Olot
- Number: 24

Youth career
- Levante Las Planas
- –2010: Espanyol
- 2010–2011: Santfeliuenc
- 2011–2013: Sant Joan Despí
- 2013–2014: Cornellà
- 2014–2015: Manchester City
- 2015–2017: Wigan Athletic

Senior career*
Years	Team	Apps	(Gls)
2017–2019	Wigan Athletic	0	(0)
2019–2020	Girona	0	(0)
2020–2022	Hércules	1	(0)
2021–2022	→ Sant Julià (loan)	22	(3)
2022–2023	Atlètic d'Escaldes	21	(0)
2023–2024	Manchego Ciudad Real	0	(0)
2024–2025	Antequera	5	(0)
2025	Coria	17	(4)
2025–	Olot	24	(0)
- * Club domestic league appearances and goals as of 15 May 2026

Víctor Alfonso Maffeo Becerra (Spanish pronunciation: [ˈbiɣtoɾ maˈfeo]; born 18 September 2000) is a Spanish professional footballer who plays as a right-back for Olot.

== Club career ==
=== Wigan Athletic ===
Born in Sant Joan Despí, Barcelona, Catalonia, Maffeo had youth spells at Espanyol and Manchester City, alongside his brother Pablo, before joining Wigan Athletic in 2015. On 29 August 2017, Maffeo made his professional debut at the age of 16, during Wigan's EFL Trophy tie against Blackpool. In which, he replaced Callum Lang in the 1–1 draw and scored Wigan's fourth penalty during the 4–3 shootout victory. He scored his first goal for the club in October 2017 in their 4-1 victory over Middlesbrough U23's in the EFL Trophy.

=== Girona ===
On 19 August 2019, after 4 years at Wigan, Girona signed Maffeo on a free transfer, returning home to Spain.

=== Hércules ===
Maffeo would quickly move on from Girona, after failing to make a first team appearance, and sign for Hércules. He would make his debut, on 15 May 2021, in a 2-1 loss at home to Cornellà. This would be his only appearance for the club.

==== Sant Julià (loan) ====
After an unsuccessful spell at Hércules the previous season, Maffeo joined Andorran side Sant Julià on a season-long loan. Maffeo picked up a suspension after receiving five yellow cards in his first 9 league matches for Sant Julià.

=== Atlètic d'Escaldes ===
Maffeo signed for Atlètic d'Escaldes ahead of the 2022–23 Primera Divisió season. He would play a pivotal role for Atlètic d'Escaldes, contributing with four assists, which saw them win the Primera Divisió for the first time in their history, as-well-as qualifying for the UEFA Champions League preliminary round for the first ever time.

=== Manchego Ciudad Real ===
After an impressive display in Atlètic d'Escaldes‘ Champions League preliminary round tie against Budućnost Podgorica, Maffeo caught the attention of Manchego Ciudad Real, who would sign him on 14 July 2023. Before the start of the league campaign, Maffeo would suffer an ACL injury in a friendly against Fuenlabrada, ruling him out for the rest of the season.

=== Antequera ===
On 27 September 2024, Maffeo signed for Antequera, after a trial period, covering the injured Iván Rodríguez.

=== Coria ===
On 30 December 2024, Maffeo signed for Coria, which officially took effect on 1 January 2025. On 26 January 2025, he scored his first senior goal in Spain in a 4-1 defeat away to Rayo Majadahonda.

=== Olot ===
On 8 July 2025, Maffeo signed for Olot on a free transfer. On 6 September, he assisted the equalising goal in his first game for the club against Barbastro. On 8 March 2026, Maffeo tore his ACL in a 1-0 loss away against Terrassa, ruling him out of playing for the rest of the season. On 26 August 2026, Maffeo signed a new one-year contract with Olot.

== Personal life ==
Maffeo is the younger brother of Mallorca player Pablo Maffeo. He is of Italian descent on his father's side and of Argentine descent on his mother's side.

== Career statistics ==
As of match, played 22 January 2018

Appearances and goals by club, season and competition
Club	Season	League			FA Cup		League Cup		Other		Total	
Club	Season	Division	Apps	Goals	Apps	Goals	Apps	Goals	Apps	Goals	Apps	Goals
Wigan Athletic	2017–18	League One	0	0	0	0	0	0	3 (Note: Appearances in EFL Trophy)	1	3	1
Career total			0	0	0	0	0	0	3	1	3	1

== Honours ==
Atlètic d'Escaldes

- Primera Divisió: 2022–23
