= Donervon Daniels =

Montserratian footballer (born 1993)

Personal information
- Full name: Donervon Joseph Daniels
- Date of birth: 24 November 1993 (age 32)
- Place of birth: Plymouth, Montserrat
- Height: 1.86 m (6 ft 1 in)
- Position: Centre-back

Team information
- Current team: Oldham Athletic
- Number: 5

Youth career
- –2009: Reading
- 2009–2011: West Bromwich Albion

Senior career*
Years	Team	Apps	(Gls)
2011–2015	West Bromwich Albion	0	(0)
2012–2013	→ Tranmere Rovers (loan)	13	(1)
2013–2014	→ Gillingham (loan)	3	(1)
2014	→ Blackpool (loan)	19	(1)
2015	→ Aberdeen (loan)	9	(0)
2015–2018	Wigan Athletic	44	(3)
2017–2018	→ Rochdale (loan)	15	(0)
2018–2019	Blackpool	24	(0)
2019–2020	Luton Town	3	(1)
2019–2020	→ Doncaster Rovers (loan)	10	(0)
2020–2022	Crewe Alexandra	26	(0)
2022–2025	Walsall	99	(4)
2025–	Oldham Athletic	39	(1)

International career^{‡}
2021–2024	Montserrat	8	(1)
- * Club domestic league appearances and goals as of 17:16, 13 May 2026 (UTC) ‡ National team caps and goals as of 11:45, 14 November 2024 (UTC)

Donervon Joseph Daniels (born 24 November 1993) is a Montserratian professional footballer who plays as a centre-back for EFL League Two club Oldham Athletic and the Montserrat national team.

== Club career ==
=== West Bromwich Albion ===
Daniels joined West Bromwich Albion in 2009 from Reading and quickly made himself a regular in Albion's FA Premier Academy League Under-18s side before moving into the Under-21s and captaining them. Developing through the academy, Daniels was awarded with first professional contract, which keep him until 2013. Not only that, Daniels ended up being awarded the Baggies’ 2011–12 Young Player of the Year Award.

After his loan spell at West Brom came to an end, the club opted to take up their option of a contract extension on Daniels to stay for another season. After Daniels skippered Albion to victory in the Birmingham Senior Cup final against Tamworth in 2014, the club, again, opted to take up their option of a contract extension on Daniels to stay for another season. Daniels had his contract extended for another season.

In the 2012–13 season, Daniels joined Tranmere Rovers on 22 November 2012, on loan. He made his debut on 21 December, in a heavy 5–0 defeat away to Swindon Town. His five appearances with Tranmere Rovers led Daniels to have a loan extension for further month, before it was extended until the end of the season. On 19 February 2013, he scored his first senior goal, in a 3–1 defeat against Swindon. After making thirteen appearances and scoring once, Daniels returned to his parent club after being recalled.

On 25 November 2013, Daniels joined Gillingham on loan until 3 January 2014 and he played the following evening against Stevenage, where he scored in the 52nd minute on his debut in a 3–2 home victory for Gillingham. After making three appearances and scoring once, Daniels returned to his parent club.

On 1 August 2014, he joined Blackpool on a 28-day youth loan. He made his debut for the club on 9 August, losing 2–0 to Nottingham Forest in the opening game of the season. Daniels loan spell with Blackpool was soon extended until 2 January 2015.

In November 2014, Blackpool were fined £30,000 for playing Daniels after his youth loan had expired. He had played against Millwall on 30 August 2014. Daniels then scored his first goal for the club on 18 October 2014, in a 4–2 loss against Huddersfield Town. By the end of November, Daniels missed four matches over "rules prevent clubs naming more than five loan players in their team". Daniels made his return on his last appearance on 26 December 2014, in a 1–0 loss against Sheffield Wednesday. The loan spell came to an end in December.

On 27 January 2015 he joined Aberdeen on loan until the end of the season. He scored on his debut for Aberdeen on 31 January 2015, against Dundee United in the semi-final of the Scottish League Cup, but Aberdeen went on to lose the match 2–1. Daniels went on to make nine appearances for the club.

=== Wigan Athletic ===
On 30 June 2015, Daniels signed for Wigan Athletic on a three-year deal. On 19 August 2015, he scored his first goal for the club in a 3–0 home victory against Scunthorpe United. After a successful first season with the club injury blighted his second, ruling him out for the majority of the 2016–17 season.

On 31 August 2017, Daniels signed for Rochdale on a season-long loan.

He was released by Wigan at the end of the 2017–18 season.

=== Blackpool ===
Daniels spent a season with League One club Blackpool, signing on 9 August 2018. Daniels made his first competitive appearance upon returning to the club on 14 August 2018 in a 3–1 victory in the EFL Cup over Barnsley.

=== Luton Town ===
In 2019, he signed for Luton Town for an unknown fee. He played two matches and scored a goal against Derby County in a 3–2 win.

=== Crewe Alexandra ===
On 27 August 2020, Daniels signed a two-year deal with newly promoted Crewe Alexandra after leaving Luton Town, making his debut the following month in the EFL Trophy against Newcastle United's Under-21 team. He made his first league start for Crewe on 10 October 2020 against former club Wigan at Gresty Road, but was substituted after an injury early in the first half. He eventually returned to the first team in February 2021, but, on just his fourth league appearance for Crewe, suffered another injury in a 1–1 draw at former club Blackpool on 2 March 2021. After a two-week absence, he returned to the side, playing in Crewe's final 11 games of the season.

=== Walsall ===
On 24 January 2022, Daniels left Crewe Alexandra by mutual consent to sign for EFL League Two side Walsall on a five-month deal. He made his debut for the club the next day, starting in the 2–1 home defeat against Bradford City. He scored his first goal on the 5 March 2022 in a 1–1 with Barrow and signed a new contract until the summer of 2023 on 29 April.

He was appointed club captain prior to the 2022–23 season. On 3 July 2023 he signed a contract until the summer of 2025. On 27 January 2024 he scored in a 1–1 draw with Sutton United which was the winner of EFL League Two goal of the month. Daniels made his 100th appearance for the Saddlers in a 2–1 win over Salford City on 1 April 2024.

He departed the club upon the expiration of his contract at the end of the 2024–25 season.

=== Oldham Athletic ===
On 27 June 2025, Daniels agreed to join newly promoted League Two side Oldham Athletic on a two-year deal.

== International career ==
Born in Montserrat but raised in England after the Soufriere Hills eruption, Daniels is eligible to represent England or Montserrat at international level. In October 2019, he received a call-up to represent Montserrat in their 2019–20 CONCACAF Nations League B games against El Salvador and the Dominican Republic, but declined the offer in order to focus on his recovery from injury.

Daniels played for Montserrat in their FIFA World Cup 2022 qualifier against US Virgin Islands on 2 June 2021, a match Montserrat won 4–0. He was then called up for Montserrat's CONCACAF Gold Cup qualification game against Trinidad and Tobago on 2 July 2021, but did not play. He was called up again in November 2023 for the CONCACAF Nations League for matches against the Dominican Republic and Barbados; he captained the side against the Dominican Republic and scored his first international goal against Barbados as Montserrat won both.

== Career statistics ==
=== Club ===
As of end of 2025–26 season

Appearances and goals by club, season and competition
Club	Season	League			National CupA		League CupA		Other		Total	
Club	Season	Division	Apps	Goals	Apps	Goals	Apps	Goals	Apps	Goals	Apps	Goals
West Bromwich Albion	2012–13	Premier League	0	0	0	0	0	0	—		0	0
West Bromwich Albion	2013–14	Premier League	0	0	0	0	0	0	—		0	0
West Bromwich Albion	2014–15	Premier League	0	0	0	0	0	0	—		0	0
West Bromwich Albion	Total		0	0	0	0	0	0	—		0	0
Tranmere Rovers (loan)	2012–13	League One	13	1	1	0	0	0	0	0	14	1
Gillingham (loan)	2013–14	League One	3	1	0	0	0	0	0	0	3	1
Blackpool (loan)	2014–15	Championship	19	1	0	0	0	0	—		19	1
Aberdeen (loan)	2014–15	Scottish Premiership	9	0	0	0	1	1	—		10	1
Wigan Athletic	2015–16	League One	42	3	1	0	0	0	2 (Note: Appearances in the Football League/EFL Trophy)	0	45	3
Wigan Athletic	2016–17	Championship	1	0	0	0	1	0	—		2	0
Wigan Athletic	2017–18	League One	1	0	0	0	2	0	1	0	4	0
Wigan Athletic	Total		44	3	1	0	3	0	3	0	51	3
Rochdale (loan)	2017–18	League One	15	0	3	0	0	0	0	0	18	0
Blackpool	2018–19	League One	24	0	3	0	1	0	2	0	30	0
Luton Town	2019–20	Championship	3	1	1	0	0	0	–		4	1
Doncaster Rovers (loan)	2019–20	League One	10	0	0	0	0	0	3	0	13	0
Crewe Alexandra	2020–21	League One	15	0	0	0	0	0	1	0	16	0
Crewe Alexandra	2021–22	League One	11	0	1	0	1	0	2	0	15	0
Crewe Alexandra	Total		26	0	1	0	1	0	3	0	31	0
Walsall	2021–22	League Two	18	1	–		–		–		18	1
Walsall	2022–23	League Two	39	2	4	0	2	0	1	0	46	2
Walsall	2023–24	League Two	35	1	4	0	1	0	0	0	40	1
Walsall	2024–25	League Two	7	0	1	0	0	0	3 (Note: Two appearances in EFL Trophy, one appearance in League Two play-offs)	0	11	0
Walsall	Total		99	4	9	0	3	0	4	0	115	4
Oldham Athletic	2025–26	League Two	39	1	2	0	0	0	0	0	41	1
Career total			304	12	21	0	9	1	15	0	349	13

=== International ===
As of match played 13 October 2024

Appearances and goals by national team and year
National team	Year	Apps	Goals
Montserrat	2021	1	0
Montserrat	2023	2	1
Montserrat	2024	5	0
Total		8	1

Scores and results list Montserrat's goal tally first.

No.	Date	Venue	Opponent	Score	Result	Competition
1.	20 November 2023	Blakes Estate Stadium, Look Out, Montserrat	Barbados	3–1	4–2	2023–24 CONCACAF Nations League B

== Honours ==
Wigan Athletic

- Football League One: 2015–16
