= Will Grigg =

Northern Irish footballer (born 1991)

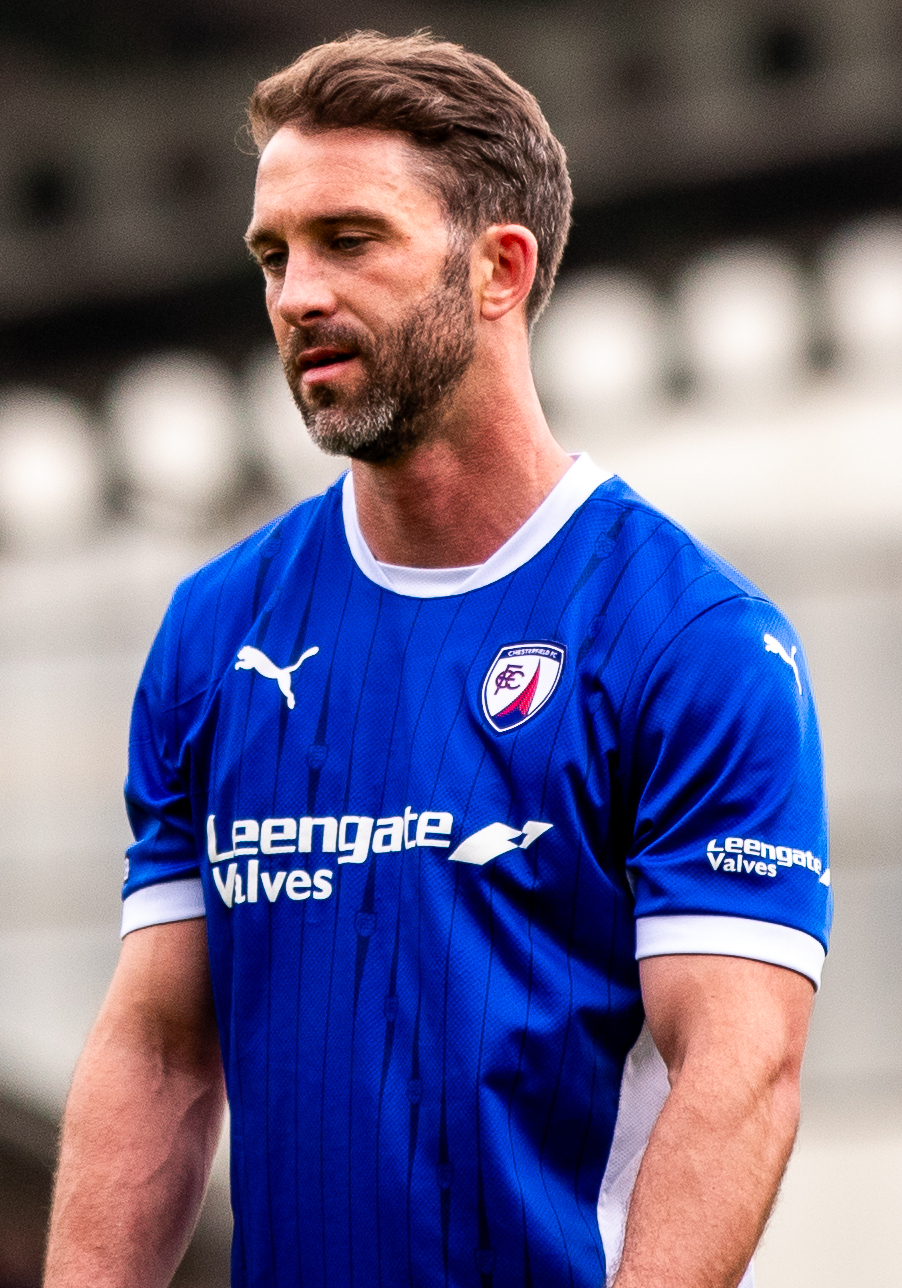
- Grigg with Chesterfield in 2025

Personal information
- Full name: William Donald Grigg
- Date of birth: 3 July 1991 (age 35)
- Place of birth: Solihull, England
- Height: 5 ft 11 in (1.80 m)
- Position: Striker

Team information
- Current team: Forest Green Rovers
- Number: 31

Youth career
- 1998–2007: Birmingham City
- 2007: Solihull Moors

Senior career*
Years	Team	Apps	(Gls)
2007–2008	Stratford Town		
2008–2013	Walsall	99	(27)
2013–2015	Brentford	34	(4)
2014–2015	→ Milton Keynes Dons (loan)	44	(20)
2015–2019	Wigan Athletic	133	(53)
2019–2022	Sunderland	47	(5)
2021	→ Milton Keynes Dons (loan)	20	(8)
2021–2022	→ Rotherham United (loan)	19	(2)
2022–2023	Milton Keynes Dons	42	(5)
2023–2026	Chesterfield	102	(41)
2026–	Forest Green Rovers	3	(1)

International career
2009–2010	Northern Ireland U19	17	(2)
2010–2012	Northern Ireland U21	10	(1)
2012–2018	Northern Ireland	13	(2)
- * Club domestic league appearances and goals as of 19 November 2026

William Donald Grigg (born 3 July 1991) is a professional footballer who plays as a striker for National League side Forest Green Rovers.

Grigg began his professional career at Walsall and came to prominence during the 2012–13 season, winning the club's Player of the Season and Players' Player of the Season awards. Since then, he has played for a number of clubs, including Brentford, MK Dons, Wigan, Sunderland, and Rotherham.

In 2016, a Wigan Athletic supporter created the song "Will Grigg's on fire" as a tribute to Grigg, sung to the tune of "Freed from Desire" by Italian singer Gala. It has become a popular football chant.

== Early life and career ==
Grigg was born in Solihull, West Midlands. He was educated at Solihull School and was signed by Birmingham City at the age of seven. He progressed through the club's youth teams, but suffered a broken leg at age 15. After his release by Birmingham in 2007, Grigg became a student at Solihull College of Technology and turned out for Solihull Moors' youth team.

== Club career ==
=== Stratford Town ===
In September 2007, Grigg signed non-contract terms with Midland Alliance side Stratford Town and made his first team debut in a 0–0 FA Cup qualifying draw versus Hednesford Town on 15 September. He started the replay and was substituted after 58 minutes for Steven Ruck. Grigg scored in a league match versus Biddulph Victoria on 29 September and again versus Racing Club Warwick on 7 October.

=== Walsall ===
Having courted interest from West Bromwich Albion, Grigg signed a scholarship at League One side Walsall in the summer of 2008. Assigned the number 24 shirt, he made his league debut as an 89th-minute substitute for Dwayne Mattis in a 0–0 draw with Cheltenham Town on 20 December 2008. Grigg was an unused substitute for a 2–1 defeat away to Tranmere Rovers on 28 December 2008 and made no further appearances in the first team squad during the 2008–09 season. Grigg made no appearances during the 2009–10 season, but was an unused substitute on 20 occasions. Grigg featured regularly as a second-half substitute during the 2010–11 season and made his first start for Walsall in a 1–0 FA Cup second round defeat at Torquay United on 27 November 2010. He made his first league start in a 1–0 away win against Charlton Athletic on 12 December 2010. He scored his first senior goal in a 2–2 league draw against Bristol Rovers on 11 January 2011. Grigg finished the 2010–11 season having made 30 appearances and scored four goals. Grigg made 32 appearances and scored four goals during the 2011–12 season.

Grigg became a regular starter during the 2012–13 season and scored seven goals before the New Year, including a brace in a 4–2 away victory over Milton Keynes Dons on Boxing Day. Grigg started 2013 in style with a goal, an assist and his first professional Man of the Match award in Walsall's televised league match against Portsmouth on 4 January. His impressive form continued as he scored his first hat-trick in a 3–0 victory at Carlisle United on 26 February, bringing his season tally up to 14 goals. He finished the 2012–13 season with a run of 10 goals in 11 matches, as Walsall mounted an unsuccessful challenge to qualify for the League One playoffs. Grigg's form led to interest from Championship side Derby County and Premier League sides Aston Villa, Southampton and Norwich City. Grigg won the Walsall Player of the Season and Players' Player of the Season awards for the 2012–13 season, having made 45 appearances and finished as the club's top scorer with 20 goals. Grigg's contract expired at the end of the season and he left the club after turning down a new four-year deal. He finished his Walsall career having made 109 appearances and scored 28 goals.

=== Brentford ===
On 1 July 2013, Grigg signed for fellow League One side Brentford on a three-year deal. As Grigg was under 24 at the time of the transfer, the deal went to a Football League tribunal and Brentford were ordered to pay an initial £325,000, plus add-ons. By July 2014, the fee had risen to £405,000. Grigg made his debut for the club in the first match of the 2013–14 season, a 1–1 away draw at Port Vale on 3 August 2013. On his next appearance, he scored his first Brentford goals, a brace in a 3–1 home victory over Sheffield United on 10 August. Injury, international call ups and being played out of position by manager Uwe Rösler led to Grigg enduring a stuttering start to his Brentford career and he admitted suffering a dip in confidence. He went 10 matches without a goal, until he was retrospectively credited with Brentford's second in a 3–2 win over Peterborough United on 26 November. In the following match, he scored the winner in a 1–0 league victory over Notts County. Grigg scored his fifth Brentford goal against Port Vale on 11 January 2014, scoring late in the second half after coming on for Sam Saunders. In March and still behind Clayton Donaldson and Marcello Trotta in the pecking order, Grigg told the Hounslow Chronicle "I haven't become a bad striker overnight. I've been training well, I'm confident and keep believing. If I get a run of games, I think I will always score goals". Grigg made regular appearances in the latter stages of a successful season in which Brentford secured automatic promotion to the Championship, but he was unable to find the net and finished the campaign with 36 appearances and 4 goals. Grigg departed Griffin Park on loan for the duration of the 2014–15 season and left the club on 14 July 2015.

=== Milton Keynes Dons ===
On 18 July 2014, it was announced that Grigg had joined League One side Milton Keynes Dons from Brentford on a season long loan. Manager Karl Robinson stated that Grigg is "a goalscorer at this level and he's a Northern Ireland international too. He's got the pedigree to come in and do well". Grigg scored on his debut for the club, levelling the score at 2–2 in an eventual 4–2 win over Gillingham on the opening day of the 2014–15 season. After three further appearances without scoring, Grigg put on a man of the match performance in a League Cup second-round match versus Manchester United on 26 August, scoring a brace in a shock 4–0 victory. The match kick-started Grigg's season and he went on to score three goals in his next six matches, to take his tally to five goals in seven matches. Grigg hit his next patch of regular goalscoring form in mid-March 2015, scoring nine goals in eight matches to help consolidate the Dons' third place in the table. His four goals in two matches over the Easter Weekend saw him named in the Football League Team of the Week. On 28 April, Grigg was presented with the Dons' Goal of the Season and Top Goalscorer awards. He finished the season with a goal in a 5–1 rout of Yeovil Town, which confirmed a second-place finish for the Dons and automatic promotion to the Championship, ahead of fellow contenders Preston North End. Grigg scored 22 goals in 50 appearances during the 2014–15 season.

=== Wigan Athletic ===
On 14 July 2015, Grigg signed for newly relegated League One club Wigan Athletic on a three-year contract for an undisclosed fee, reported to be "around £1 million". Grigg scored his first goal from the penalty spot in a 2–1 defeat to Bury in the League Cup first round. Grigg scored his first hat-trick for Wigan in a 3–0 victory over Port Vale on 30 January 2016.

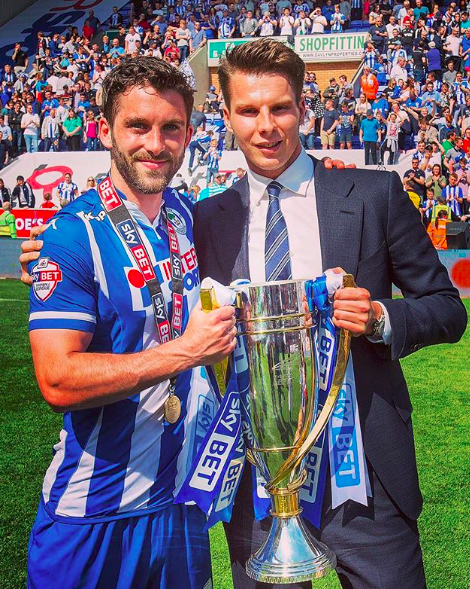
Will Grigg with chairman David Sharpe, pictured with the League One trophy after winning it with Wigan Athletic during the 2015–16 season.

Grigg scored 25 League goals during the 2015–16 season, finishing as League One's top goalscorer, to help Wigan earn automatic promotion. His performances earned him a tied 25th place in the initial voting process for the UEFA Best Player in Europe Award after the 2015–16 campaign.

On 19 February 2018, Grigg scored the only goal in Wigan's 1–0 home win against Manchester City in the FA Cup fifth round. This brought his total FA Cup goals for the season to seven, including four goals against top-flight opposition, making him the leading scorer in the season's FA Cup (from the first round onwards).

=== Sunderland ===
Grigg signed for Sunderland on transfer deadline day, 31 January 2019 for a fee of £3,000,000, which was, at the time, the highest transfer fee ever paid by an English third-division club. Grigg made his debut for the Wearside club on 9 February where they drew 1–1 away to Oxford United in the league. On the 19th Grigg scored his first goal for his new club in his 4th appearance slotting in a penalty to take Sunderland into a 3–2 lead over Gillingham. The match eventually finished 4–2. Grigg's goal put Sunderland 1–0 ahead of home side Bristol Rovers in the EFL Trophy semi final on 5 March. Sunderland travelled to Wembley for the final after winning 2–0. The other goal coming from Lewis Morgan. On 31 March Grigg started in the 2019 EFL Trophy Final against Portsmouth, he was substituted off in the 77th minute with Sunderland 1–0 up through an Aiden McGeady goal. However, the match finished 1–1, (2–2 AET) and Portsmouth won 5–4 on penalties.

Grigg struggled for form during the 2019–20 season, making 20 league appearances and scoring just one goal as Sunderland finished 8th and failed to qualify for the playoffs, after the League One season was ended due to the COVID-19 pandemic. In an interview with Wigan Today in June 2020, Grigg indicated that he regretted leaving Wigan to join Sunderland, stating "I absolutely loved my time at Wigan and, in hindsight, I probably should not have moved".

==== Milton Keynes Dons (second loan) ====
On 1 February 2021, Grigg returned to previous club Milton Keynes Dons on loan for the remainder of the 2020–21 season. On 20 February 2021, he scored the first goal of his second spell at the club (and his first in over a year), in a 4–3 home win over Northampton Town. On 24 April 2021, Grigg scored four goals in a single match during a 5–0 home win over Swindon Town, becoming the first MK Dons player to score four goals in a single game in the club's history.

==== Rotherham United (loan) ====
On 31 August 2021, Grigg joined Rotherham United on loan for the 2021–22 season.

=== Milton Keynes Dons ===
On 14 July 2022, Grigg returned to League One club Milton Keynes Dons on a free transfer for a third spell, this time on a permanent basis. He made his third debut for the club on 30 July 2022 in a 1–0 defeat away to Cambridge United. On 27 August 2022, Grigg scored his first goals in his third spell with the club, scoring a brace in a 4–0 away win over Morecambe. He went on to make 48 appearances that season, scoring 7 goals, however the club were relegated to League Two after finishing in 21st place.

=== Chesterfield ===
On 22 June 2023, Grigg joined National League club Chesterfield for an undisclosed fee on a 3-year contract, reuniting with previous manager Paul Cook.

Having scored six goals in as many matches, Grigg was named EFL League Two Player of the Month for October 2024.

=== Forest Green Rovers ===
On 23 October 2026, Grigg signed for National League side Forest Green Rovers on a deal until June 2028.

== International career ==
Grigg was born in England but was eligible to play for Northern Ireland through a grandparent. He has represented Northern Ireland at U19, U21 and senior level. He scored on his U21 debut after coming on as a substitute against San Marino in a UEFA U21 European Championship Qualifier on 3 September 2010 and earned his first senior cap in a 6–0 defeat to the Netherlands in a friendly on 2 June 2012, playing the full 90 minutes. After a further five friendly and 2014 World Cup qualifying appearances, Grigg failed to win a cap between October 2013 and March 2015, but his good form for Milton Keynes Dons earned him a start in a friendly versus Scotland. He played 58 minutes of the 1–0 defeat, before being substituted by Paddy McCourt.

On 18 May 2016, Grigg was selected as part of the provisional 27-man squad to represent Northern Ireland in the UEFA Euro 2016 competition. On 28 May, he was named in the final 23-man squad, but ended up not playing a single minute throughout the tournament.

== Personal life ==
Grigg was born into an Aston Villa-supporting family and supported the club up until the age of seven, when he joined Birmingham City and changed his allegiances.

== "Will Grigg's on Fire" ==
In May 2016, Wigan Athletic supporter Sean Kennedy uploaded a video to YouTube titled "Will Grigg's on fire", which featured a song written in recognition of the recent goal-scoring feats of Grigg with the chorus to "Will Grigg's on fire, your defence is terrified" sung to the tune of "Freed from Desire" by Italian singer Gala. Since it was uploaded, the song has become a very popular football chant and a national sensation. Kennedy received a free Wigan season ticket from the Wigan chairman David Sharpe for the 2016–17 season as a result of success of the chant.

On 31 May 2016, Electro duo Blonde released a version of the song and it entered the iTunes charts at number seven, as well as reaching number 76 on the Official UK Singles Chart.

On 25 June 2016, DJ/Producer DJ B3LFAST reached number 17 on the iTunes Germany Top 100 chart with his own parody song "Will Grigg's On Fire" featuring new original lyrics

In 2021, Grigg spoke on the topic, noting that while "the song itself never annoyed me", he disliked how "some people only connected me with it and not with my goals".

== Career statistics ==
=== Club ===
As of match played on 10 August 2025

Appearances and goals by club, season and competition
Club	Season	League			FA Cup		League Cup		Other		Total	
Club	Season	Division	Apps	Goals	Apps	Goals	Apps	Goals	Apps	Goals	Apps	Goals
Walsall	2008–09	League One	1	0	0	0	0	0	0	0	1	0
Walsall	2009–10	League One	0	0	0	0	0	0	0	0	0	0
Walsall	2010–11	League One	28	4	1	0	1	0	0	0	30	4
Walsall	2011–12	League One	29	4	3	0	0	0	1 (Note: Appearances in Football League Trophy/EFL Trophy)	0	33	4
Walsall	2012–13	League One	41	19	1	0	2	0	1	1	45	20
Walsall	Total		99	27	5	0	3	0	2	1	109	28
Brentford	2013–14	League One	34	4	2	0	0	0	0	0	36	4
Milton Keynes Dons (loan)	2014–15	League One	44	20	3	0	3	2	0	0	50	22
Wigan Athletic	2015–16	League One	40	25	1	0	1	1	1	2	43	28
Wigan Athletic	2016–17	Championship	33	5	2	1	1	1	—		36	7
Wigan Athletic	2017–18	League One	43	19	8	7	2	0	0	0	53	26
Wigan Athletic	2018–19	Championship	17	4	1	0	0	0	—		18	4
Wigan Athletic	Total		133	53	12	8	4	2	1	2	150	65
Sunderland	2018–19	League One	18	4	—		—		4 (Note: Two appearances and one goal in EFL Trophy, two in League One play-offs)	1	22	5
Sunderland	2019–20	League One	20	1	2	0	3	1	2	1	27	3
Sunderland	2020–21	League One	9	0	1	0	1	0	0	0	11	0
Sunderland	2021–22	League One	0	0	0	0	1	0	—		1	0
Sunderland	Total		47	5	3	0	5	1	6	2	61	8
Milton Keynes Dons (loan)	2020–21	League One	20	8	—		—		—		20	8
Rotherham United (loan)	2021–22	League One	19	2	3	1	—		6 (Note: Six appearances, three goals in EFL Trophy.)	3	28	6
Milton Keynes Dons	2022–23	League One	42	5	2	1	2	0	2	1	48	7
Chesterfield	2023–24	National League	38	24	4	1	—		0	0	42	25
Chesterfield	2024–25	League Two	30	11	2	2	0	0	3	0	35	13
Chesterfield	2025–26	League Two	32	4	1	0	1	0	3 (Note: 2 apps in the League Two play-off, one in the EFL Trophy)	0	37	4
Chesterfield	Total		100	41	7	3	1	0	6	0	114	44
Career total			538	165	37	13	18	7	23	9	629	194

=== International ===
As of match played 12 October 2018

Appearances and goals by national team and year
National team	Year	Apps	Goals
Northern Ireland	2012	1	0
Northern Ireland	2013	4	0
Northern Ireland	2015	2	0
Northern Ireland	2016	3	1
Northern Ireland	2018	3	1
Total		13	2

As of match played 8 September 2018. Northern Ireland score listed first, score column indicates score after each Grigg goal.

List of international goals scored by Will Grigg
No.	Date	Venue	Cap	Opponent	Score	Result	Competition	Ref.
1	27 May 2016	Windsor Park, Belfast, Northern Ireland	8	Belarus	3–0	3–0	Friendly	
2	8 September 2018	Windsor Park, Belfast, Northern Ireland	11	Bosnia and Herzegovina	1–2	1–2	2018–19 UEFA Nations League B	

== Honours ==
Brentford

- Football League One second-place promotion: 2013–14

Milton Keynes Dons

- Football League One second-place promotion: 2014–15

Wigan Athletic

- EFL League One: 2015–16, 2017–18

Sunderland

- EFL Trophy runner-up: 2018–19

Rotherham United

- EFL League One second-place promotion: 2021–22

Chesterfield

- National League: 2023–24

Individual

- Walsall Player of the Season: 2012–13
- Walsall Players' Player of the Season: 2012–13
- Football League One/EFL League One Player of the Month: April 2016, April 2018
- EFL League Two Player of the Month: October 2024
- PFA Fans' Player of the Year: 2015–16 League One
- PFA Team of the Year: 2015–16 League One, 2017–18 League One
- National League Team of the Season: 2023–24
