= Luke Burke =

English footballer

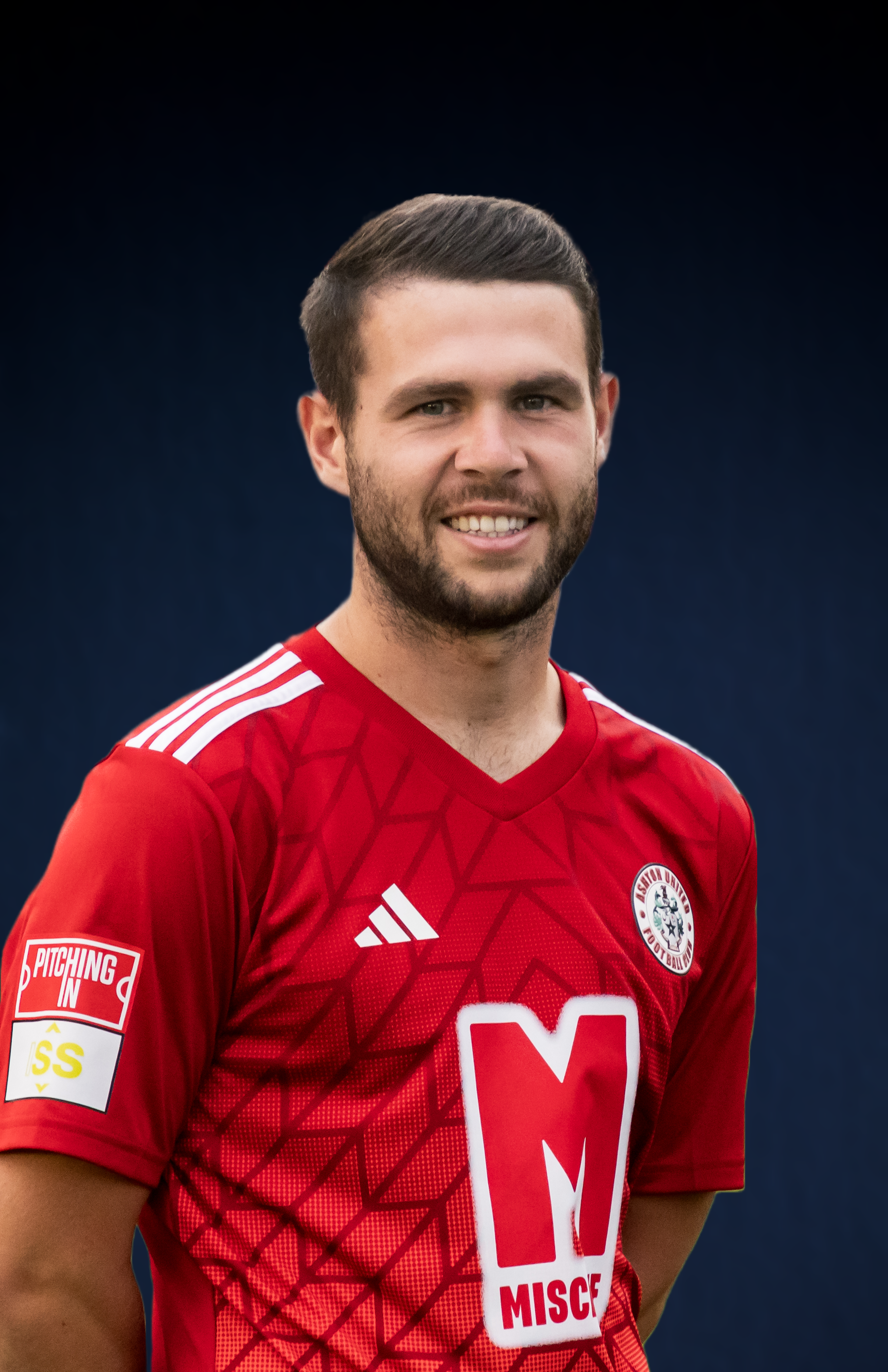
- Luke Burke playing for Ashton United.

Personal information
- Full name: Luke Burke
- Date of birth: 22 February 1998 (age 28)
- Place of birth: Liverpool, England
- Height: 5 ft 7 in (1.70 m)
- Position: Right-back

Team information
- Current team: Ashton United

Youth career
- 2010–2016: Wigan Athletic

Senior career*
Years	Team	Apps	(Gls)
2016–2018	Wigan Athletic	5	(0)
2017	→ Barrow (loan)	2	(0)
2017–2018	→ AFC Fylde (loan)	32	(0)
2018–2023	AFC Fylde	86	(1)
2022	→ Buxton (loan)	7	(0)
2023	→ AFC Telford United (loan)	13	(0)
2023–	Ashton United		
- * Club domestic league appearances and goals as of 04:19, 1 May 2019 (UTC)

Luke Burke (born 22 February 1998) is an English professional footballer who plays as a defender for Northern Premier League Premier Division club Ashton United.

== Career ==
=== Wigan Athletic ===
Burke is an academy graduate of Wigan Athletic. He joined the club when he was 11 years old and went on to captain the club's U18 side. In May 2016 he was awarded the Michael Millett Award for Wigan's Academy Player of the Season. The following month he was one of six players from Wigan's academy to be offered a pro contract with the club. Following his performances at youth level the season before, Burke was included, and featured regularly in Wigan's pre-season for the 2016–17 Championship campaign. He made his non-competitive debut against Liverpool and scored his first goal for the club two weeks later in a friendly against Fleetwood. He stood out for Wigan during the pre-season and on 8 August 2016 was handed his debut by manager Gary Caldwell in a 2–1 defeat to Bristol City. On 23 November, Burke signed a contract-extension with Wigan following a string of good performances in the early stages of the season.

=== AFC Fylde ===
On 15 February 2017, Burke joined National League side Barrow on a month-long loan, and made his debut on the same day in a 1–0 victory over Macclesfield. He made three appearances for Barrow altogether, including his cup debut in the FA Trophy, before returning to Wigan. Following his return, he featured in three Cup matches before joining AFC Fylde on loan, initially on a six-month loan. The loan was later extended until the end of the season. He was then released by Wigan upon his return to the club whereafter he signed for Fylde on a permanent deal.

== Career statistics ==
=== Club ===
As of 28 April 2018

Appearances and by club, season and competition
Club	Season	League			FA Cup		EFL Cup		Other (Note: Includes FA Trophy matches.)		Total	
Club	Season	League	Apps	Goals	Apps	Goals	Apps	Goals	Apps	Goals	Apps	Goals
Wigan Athletic	2016–17	Championship	5	0	0	0	0	0	—		5	0
Wigan Athletic	2017–18	League One	0	0	0	0	2	0	1	0	3	0
Barrow (loan)	2016–17	National League	2	0	0	0	—		1	0	3	0
AFC Fylde (loan)	2017–18	National League	32	0	2	0	—		1	0	35	0
Career Total			39	0	2	0	2	0	3	0	46	0

== Honours ==
Individual

- Wigan Athletic Academy Player of the Season: 2015–16
