= David Sharpe (football chairman) =

English football administrator (born 1991)

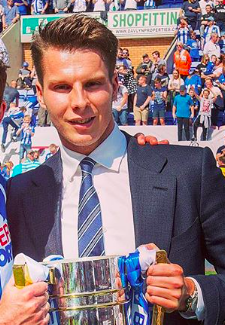
Sharpe with the League One trophy won in 2016

David Sharpe (born 11 May 1991) is an English football administrator who has been the head of football operations at Bradford City since April 2024. He was formerly chairman of Wigan Athletic (2015–2019).

== Career ==
Sharpe was born in Wigan. He was educated at Shrewsbury School, and then studied business at Oxford Brookes University. Sharpe's grandfather is Dave Whelan, who took control of Wigan Athletic in February 1995. Whelan made Sharpe a director at Wigan in December 2014, and he was appointed as chairman after Whelan's resignation in March 2015. At the age of 23, he became one of the world's youngest football bosses. Sharpe's appointment came with shock and scepticism from both fans and the media as the youngest chairman in English football. He left the club in 2019.

After working at Mansfield Town, he became head of football operations at Bradford City in April 2024. The appointment was praised by City manager Graham Alexander.
