= 2023–24 Walsall F.C. season =

136th season in existence of Walsall FC

Walsall
2023–24 season
- Owner: Trivela Group
- Chairman: Benjamin Boycott; Leigh Pomlett
- Head Coach: Mat Sadler
- Stadium: Bescot Stadium
- League Two: 11th
- FA Cup: Third round
- EFL Cup: First round
- EFL Trophy: Group stage
Home colours	Away colours	Third colours

The 2023–24 season is the 136th season in the history of Walsall and their fifth consecutive season in League Two. The club are participating in 2023–24 EFL League Two, the FA Cup, the EFL Cup, and the 2023–24 EFL Trophy.

== Current squad ==
As of 12 March 2024

No.	Name	Position	Nationality	Place of birth	Date of birth (age)	Previous club	Date signed	Fee	Contract end
Goalkeepers
1	Owen Evans	GK	(Wales)	Newport	28 November 1996 (age 29)	Cheltenham Town	1 July 2022	Undisclosed	30 June 2024
22	Jackson Smith	GK	(England)	Telford	14 October 2001 (age 25)	Wolverhampton Wanderers	21 July 2023	Undisclosed	30 June 2024
32	George Barrett	GK	(England)			Academy	25 November 2022	Trainee	30 June 2024
Defenders
2	David Okagbue	CB	(Republic of Ireland)		5 October 2003 (age 23)	Stoke City	1 September 2023	Loan	31 May 2024
3	Liam Gordon	LB	(Guyana)	(England) London	15 May 1999 (age 27)	Bolton Wanderers	1 July 2022	Free	30 June 2025
4	Oisin McEntee	CB	(Republic of Ireland)	Shercock	5 January 2001 (age 25)	Newcastle United	1 July 2022	Free	30 June 2025
5	Donervon Daniels	CB	(Montserrat)	Plymouth	24 November 1993 (age 32)	Crewe Alexandra	24 January 2022	Undisclosed	30 June 2025
6	Priestley Farquharson	CB	(England)	London	15 March 1997 (age 29)	(Wales) Newport County	1 July 2023	Free	30 June 2025
12	Joe Foulkes	RB	(England)	Dudley	23 June 2003 (age 23)	Academy	1 July 2021	Trainee	30 June 2024
19	Harry Williams	CB	(England)		15 August 2002 (age 24)	Alvechurch	20 July 2023	Undisclosed	30 June 2024
24	Rollin Menayese	CB	(Wales)	(Democratic Republic of the Congo) Kinshasa	4 December 1997 (age 28)	Mansfield Town	4 January 2022	Undisclosed	30 June 2024
31	Cayden Bennett	CB	(England)			Academy	13 November 2023	Trainee	30 June 2024
36	Emmanuel Adegboyega	CB	(Republic of Ireland)	Dundalk	16 September 2003 (age 23)	Norwich City	4 January 2024	Loan	31 May 2024
Midfielders
7	Joe Riley	DM	(England)	Blackpool	6 December 1996 (age 29)	Carlisle United	1 July 2022	Free	30 June 2024
8	Isaac Hutchinson	AM	(England)	Eastbourne	10 April 2000 (age 26)	Derby County	1 July 2022	Free	30 June 2025
14	Brandon Comley	CM	(Montserrat)	(England) Islington	18 November 1995 (age 30)	Dagenham & Redbridge	1 July 2022	Free	30 June 2026
17	Jack Earing	CM	(England)	Bury	21 January 1999 (age 27)	FC Halifax Town	1 July 2021	Undisclosed	30 June 2025
21	Taylor Allen	LM	(England)	Walsall	16 June 2000 (age 26)	Forest Green Rovers	1 July 2022	Free	30 June 2024
25	Ryan Stirk	DM	(Wales)	Birmingham	25 September 2000 (age 26)	Birmingham City	1 July 2023	Free	30 June 2025
26	Ross Tierney	CM	(Republic of Ireland)	Dublin	6 March 2001 (age 25)	(Scotland) Motherwell	24 July 2023	Loan	31 May 2024
27	Dylan Thomas	CM	(England)			Academy	22 August 2023	Trainee	30 June 2024
30	Jamie Jellis	CM	(England)	Aylesbury	12 January 2001 (age 25)	Tamworth	25 January 2024	Undisclosed	30 June 2025
Forwards
9	Jamille Matt	CF	(Jamaica)	Kingston	20 October 1989 (age 37)	Forest Green Rovers	13 January 2023	Undisclosed	30 June 2024
10	Tom Knowles	LW	(England)	Cambridge	27 September 1998 (age 28)	Yeovil Town	4 August 2022	Undisclosed	30 June 2024
11	Douglas James-Taylor	CF	(England)	London	18 November 2001 (age 24)	Stoke City	1 July 2023	Free	30 June 2024
18	Josh Gordon	CF	(England)	Stoke-on-Trent	10 October 1994 (age 32)	Burton Albion	11 January 2024	Loan	31 May 2024
20	Aramide Oteh	CF	(England)	Lee	10 September 1998 (age 28)	Crawley Town	24 July 2023	Free	30 June 2024
23	Modou Faal	CF	(The Gambia)		11 February 2003 (age 23)	West Bromwich Albion	15 January 2024	Loan	31 May 2024
33	Jaiy Leydon	CF	(England)			Academy	13 November 2023	Trainee	30 June 2024
34	Charlie Wragg	CF	(England)			Academy	13 November 2023	Trainee	30 June 2024
39	Danny Johnson	CF	(England)	Middlesbrough	28 February 1993 (age 33)	Mansfield Town	1 July 2023	Free	30 June 2025
Out on Loan
16	Ronan Maher	CM	(Republic of Ireland)	(England) Birmingham	30 December 2004 (age 21)	Academy	1 July 2022	Trainee	30 June 2025
—N/a	Evan Weir	LB	(Republic of Ireland)	Ratoath	16 April 2002 (age 24)	(Republic of Ireland) Drogheda United	1 January 2024	Free	30 June 2025

== Transfers ==
=== In ===
Date	Pos	Player	Transferred from	Fee	Ref
1 July 2023	CB	(England) Priestley Farquharson	(Wales) Newport County	Free Transfer	
1 July 2023	LB	(England) Chris Hussey	(England) Stockport County	Free Transfer	
1 July 2023	ST	(England) Douglas James-Taylor	(England) Stoke City	Free Transfer	
1 July 2023	ST	(England) Danny Johnson	(England) Mansfield Town	Free Transfer	
1 July 2023	DM	(Wales) Ryan Stirk	(England) Birmingham City	Free Transfer	
20 July 2023	CB	(England) Harry Williams	(England) Alvechurch	Undisclosed	
21 July 2023	GK	(England) Jackson Smith	(England) Wolverhampton Wanderers	Undisclosed	
24 July 2023	CF	(England) Aramide Oteh	(England) Crawley Town	Free Transfer	
1 January 2024	LB	(Republic of Ireland) Evan Weir	(Republic of Ireland) Drogheda United	Undisclosed	
25 January 2024	CM	(England) Jamie Jellis	(England) Tamworth	Undisclosed	

=== Out ===
Date	Pos	Player	To	Fee	Ref
30 June 2023	CF	(England) Timmy Abraham	(England) Boreham Wood	Released	
30 June 2023	CB	(England) Peter Clarke	(England) Warrington Town	Released	
30 June 2023	DM	(Republic of Ireland) Liam Kinsella	(England) Swindon Town	Released	
30 June 2023	CM	(England) Joss Labadie	(England) Solihull Moors	Released	
30 June 2023	AM	(England) Jacob Maddox	(England) Forest Green Rovers	Released	
30 June 2023	CB	(Cameroon) Manny Monthé	(England) Northampton Town	Released	
30 June 2023	CF	(England) Jonas Mukuna	(England) Farnborough	Released	
30 June 2023	CM	(England) Sam Perry	(Republic of Ireland) Waterford	Released	
30 June 2023	RB	(England) Hayden White	(England) Ebbsfleet United	Released	
30 June 2023	CF	(Republic of Ireland) Conor Wilkinson	(Scotland) Motherwell	Released	
30 June 2023	CF	(England) Andy Williams	(England) Hereford	Released	
21 July 2023	CF	(England) Shay Willock	(England) Alvechurch	Free Transfer	
13 September 2023	LB	(England) Chris Hussey	(England) Stratford Town	Released	
2 January 2024	CM	(England) Marvellous Onabirekhanlen	(England) Sporting Khalsa	Released	

=== Loaned in ===
Date	Pos	Player	Loaned from	Date until	Ref
7 July 2023	CF	(England) Freddie Draper	(England) Lincoln City	5 January 2024 (Note: On 5 January, Draper was recalled early to Lincoln.)	
24 July 2023	AM	(Republic of Ireland) Ross Tierney	(Scotland) Motherwell	End of Season	
1 September 2023	DM	(England) Harvey Griffiths	(England) Wolverhampton Wanderers	2 January 2024 (Note: On 2 January, Griffiths was recalled early to Wolves.)	
1 September 2023	CB	(Republic of Ireland) David Okagbue	(England) Stoke City	End of Season	
4 January 2024	CB	(Republic of Ireland) Emmanuel Adegboyega	(England) Norwich City	End of Season	
11 January 2024	CF	(England) Josh Gordon	(England) Burton Albion	End of Season	
15 January 2024	CF	(The Gambia) Modou Faal	(England) West Bromwich Albion	End of Season	

=== Loaned out ===
Date	Pos	Player	Loaned to	Until	Ref
9 August 2023	CM	(England) Marvellous Onabirekhanlen	(England) Stourbridge	3 September 2023	
25 August 2023	CM	(Republic of Ireland) Ronan Maher	(England) Rushall Olympic	7 November 2023 (Note: On 7 November, Maher was recalled early from his loan at Rushall Olympic.)	
6 September 2023	CM	(England) Marvellous Onabirekhanlen	(England) Chasetown	13 November 2023 (Note: On 16 October, Onabirekhanlen's loan at Chasetown was extended by a further month.)	
14 September 2023	GK	(England) George Barrett	(England) Paget Rangers	12 October 2023	
1 January 2024	LB	(Republic of Ireland) Evan Weir	(Republic of Ireland) Drogheda United	End of Season	
25 January 2024	CB	(Wales) Rollin Menayese	(England) Aldershot Town	12 March 2024 (Note: On 12 March, Menayese was recalled early from his loan at Aldershot.)	
26 January 2024	CM	(Republic of Ireland) Ronan Maher	(England) Rushall Olympic	End of Season	

== Pre-season and friendlies ==
On 23 May, Walsall announced their first pre-season friendly, against Solihull Moors. Two further matches were added on 2 June, against Leamington and Aston Villa. In memory of Wayne Evans, a pre-season fixture against Rochdale was added.

Win Draw Loss Fixtures

11 July 2023 Friendly	Leamington	1–4	Walsall	Leamington Spa
19:45 BST	Stewart 45'	Report	Johnson 1'; James-Taylor 32', 40'; Hutchinson 48'	Stadium: New Windmill Ground

15 July 2023 Friendly	Walsall	1–1	Aston Villa	Bescot
13:00 BST	Johnson 31'	Report	Watkins 43' (pen.)	Stadium: Bescot Stadium; Attendance: 9,328

21 July 2023 Wayne Evans Memorial	Walsall	1–1	Rochdale	Bescot
19:30 BST	Hutchinson 77'	Report	Rodney 27'	Stadium: Bescot Stadium

25 July 2023 Friendly	West Bromwich Albion U21	0–2	Walsall	Walsall
14:00 BST		Report	James-Taylor 24'; Draper 32'	Stadium: West Bromwich Albion Training Ground; Attendance: 0 (behind closed doors)

29 July 2023 Friendly	Solihull Moors	0–3	Walsall	Solihull
15:00 BST		Report	Gordon 76'; Hutchinson 89'; Maher 90+2'	Stadium: Damson Park; Attendance: 1,034 (570 away)

== Competitions ==
=== Overall record ===
Competition	Starting round	Final position	Record							
Competition	Starting round	Final position	Pld	W	D	L	GF	GA	GD	Win %
League Two	Matchday 1		25	10	6	9	39	36	+3	40.00
FA Cup	First round	Third round	4	2	1	1	5	5	+0	50.00
EFL Cup	First round	First round	1	0	0	1	3	4	−1	0.00
EFL Trophy	Group stage	Group stage	3	0	1	2	5	7	−2	0.00
Total			33	12	8	13	52	52	+0	36.36

Last updated: 6 January 2024
Source: Soccerway

=== League Two ===
==== League table ====
Pos	Team	Pld	W	D	L	GF	GA	GD	Pts
8	Barrow	46	18	15	13	62	56	+6	69
9	Bradford City	46	19	12	15	61	59	+2	69
10	AFC Wimbledon	46	17	14	15	64	51	+13	65
11	Walsall	46	18	11	17	69	73	−4	65
12	Gillingham	46	18	10	18	46	57	−11	64
13	Harrogate Town	46	17	12	17	60	69	−9	63
14	Notts County	46	18	7	21	89	86	+3	61

Source: EFL Official Website
Rules for classification: 1) Points; 2) Goal difference; 3) Number of goals scored; 4) Head-to-head results; 5) Wins; 6) Away goals; 7) Penalty points (sec 9.5); 8) 12-point sending off offences

==== Results summary ====
Overall								Home						Away					
Pld	W	D	L	GF	GA	GD	Pts	W	D	L	GF	GA	GD	W	D	L	GF	GA	GD
45	18	11	16	68	68	0	65	12	6	5	35	24	+11	6	5	11	33	44	−11

Last updated: 20 April 2024.
Source: Soccerway

==== Matches ====
On 22 June, the EFL League Two fixtures were released.

Win Draw Loss Fixtures

5 August 2023 1	Morecambe	2–1	Walsall	Morecambe
15:00 BST	Mayor 25'; Love (yellow card) 34'; Songo'o (yellow card) 38'; McKiernan (yellow card) 48'; Rawson 90+2' (yellow card) 90+3'; Bedeau (yellow card) 90+5'; Slew (yellow card) 90+11'	Report	Riley (yellow card) 37'; Johnson 38' (yellow card) 90+5'; McEntee (yellow card) 45+1'; Hutchinson (yellow card) 86'	Stadium: Globe Arena; Attendance: 4,609; Referee: Martin Coy

12 August 2023 2	Walsall	2–1	Stockport County	Bescot
15:00 BST	Johnson 25'; Stirk (yellow card) 42'; Draper (yellow card) 49'; Hutchinson (yellow card) 63'; Oteh 79'	Report	Johnson (yellow card) 7'; Horsfall (yellow card) 67'; Barry (yellow card) 70'; Southam-Hales (yellow card) 75'; Olaofe (yellow card) 82'; Rydel 90+7'	Stadium: Bescot Stadium; Attendance: 6,008; Referee: Jacob Miles

15 August 2023 3	Wrexham	4–2	Walsall	Wrexham
19:45 BST	Boyle 8'; Palmer (yellow card) 16' (goal) 20'; Bickerstaff 56'; Lee 85'	Report	Hussey 24'; McEntee (yellow card) 35'; Foulkes (yellow card) 53'; Oteh (yellow card) 83'; Forde 90+1' (o.g.)	Stadium: Racecourse Ground; Attendance: 10,118; Referee: Simon Mather

19 August 2023 4	Crewe Alexandra	2–2	Walsall	Crewe
15:00 BST	Nevitt 60' (yellow card) 77'; Powell 90+4'	Report	Draper 1'; Hutchinson 29'; Stirk (yellow card) 65'	Stadium: Gresty Road; Attendance: 4,892; Referee: Sam Allison

26 August 2023 5	Walsall	1–1	Grimsby Town	Bescot
15:00 BST	Hussey (yellow card) 9' (yellow-red card) 90+2'; Knowles (yellow card) 59'; Stirk 81'; Evans (yellow card) 90+6'	Report	Rose (yellow card) 7'; Rodgers (yellow card) 41'; Eisa 52'; Clifton (yellow card) 89'	Stadium: Bescot Stadium; Attendance: 5,314; Referee: Ben Atkinson

2 September 2023 6	Walsall	1–0	Colchester United	Bescot
15:00 BST	Farquharson (yellow card) 43'; Hutchinson 65'; Evans (yellow card) 76'; Draper (yellow card) 79'; Stirk (yellow card) 87'	Report	Taylor (yellow card) 54'	Stadium: Bescot Stadium; Attendance: 5,058; Referee: Lee Swabey

9 September 2023 7	Salford City	1–2	Walsall	Kersal
15:00 BST	Smith 15'; Mallan (yellow card) 56'; Ashley (yellow card) 75'	Report	Draper 59'; Stirk (yellow card) 76'; McEntee 77'	Stadium: Moor Lane; Attendance: 2,847; Referee: Paul Howard

16 September 2023 8	Swindon Town	2–0	Walsall	Swindon
15:00 BST	Austin 2'; Khan (yellow card) 36'; Hepburn-Murphy 88'; Hutton (yellow card) 90+4'	Report	Hutchinson (yellow card) 25'; Knowles (yellow card) 62' (yellow-red card) 66'; Gordon (yellow card) 90+4'	Stadium: The County Ground; Attendance: 9,131; Referee: Matthew Corlett

23 September 2023 9	Walsall	1–3	AFC Wimbledon	Bescot
15:00 BST	Allen (red card) 37'; Draper 58'	Report	Lemonheigh-Evans 6' (yellow card) 78'; Little (penalty missed) 56'; Currie 61'; Ogundere (yellow card) 72'; Al-Hamadi 83'	Stadium: Bescot Stadium; Attendance: 5,318; Referee: Declan Bourne

30 September 2003 10	Bradford City	1–3	Walsall	Bradford
15:00 BST	Cook 23' (pen.); Tulloch (yellow card) 55'	Report	Riley (yellow card) 22'; Gordon 26' (yellow card) 43'; Oteh 45+3'; Draper 56'; Tierney (yellow card) 76'; Williams (yellow card) 79'	Stadium: Valley Parade; Attendance: 17,038; Referee: Scott Jackson

3 October 2023 11	Walsall	0–0	Milton Keynes Dons	Bescot
19:45 BST	McEntee (yellow card) 27'; Hutchinson (yellow card) 41'; Williams (yellow card) 53'	Report	Harrison (yellow card) 24'; Gilbey (yellow card) 66'; Norman (yellow card) 67'	Stadium: Bescot Stadium; Attendance: 4,515; Referee: Christopher Pollard

7 October 2023 12	Sutton United	4–0	Walsall	Sutton
15:00 BST	Patrick 6'; Smith 12', 37'; Riley 12' (o.g.)	Report		Stadium: Gander Green Lane; Attendance: 3,009 (275 away); Referee: Ed Duckworth

14 October 2023 13	Walsall	4–1	Gillingham	Bescot
15:00 BST	Hutchinson 34', 58', 85'; Draper 39'; Tierney (yellow card) 70'; Knowles (yellow card) 72'; McEntee (yellow card) 77'	Report	Clark (yellow card) 48'; Bonne 60' (yellow card) 74'; Ogie (yellow card) 90+5'	Stadium: Bescot Stadium; Attendance: 5,633 (600 away); Referee: Charles Breakspear

20 October 2023 14	Newport County	3–3	Walsall	Newport
19:45 GMT	Morris 4', 67'; Evans 45+4'	Report	Draper 16', 53', 90+6' (yellow card) 90+7'; Knowles (yellow card) 61'	Stadium: Rodney Parade; Attendance: 3,896; Referee: Sunny Gill

24 October 2023 15	Walsall	1–1	Crawley Town	Bescot
19:45 GMT	Johnson 88'	Report	Tsaroulla (yellow card) 55'; Maguire (yellow card) 81'; Williams (yellow card) 88'; Orsi 90+4'	Stadium: Bescot Stadium; Attendance: 4,108; Referee: Will Finnie

28 October 2023 16	Mansfield Town	2–1	Walsall	Mansfield
15:00 GMT	Flint 16'; Brunt (yellow card) 38'; Gale (yellow card) 59'; Bowery 71'; Boateng (yellow card) 86'	Report	Knowles (yellow card) 40'; Stirk 52'; Comley (yellow card) 59'	Stadium: Field Mill; Attendance: 7,641; Referee: David Rock

11 November 2023 17	Walsall	0–1	Harrogate Town	Bescot
15:00 GMT		Report	Sutton (yellow card) 52'; Falkingham (yellow card) 82'; Thomson 84'	Stadium: Bescot Stadium; Attendance: 4,654; Referee: Matthew Corlett

25 November 2023 19	Walsall	0–0	Forest Green Rovers	Bescot
15:00 GMT	Maher (yellow card) 35'; McEntee (yellow card) 90+1'	Report	Deeney (yellow card) 89'; Bernard (yellow card) 90+1'; Welch (yellow card) 90+7'	Stadium: Bescot Stadium; Attendance: 6,317; Referee: Peter Wright

28 November 2023 20	Barrow	2–0	Walsall	Barrow-in-Furness
19:45 GMT	Whitfield 11'; Acquah (yellow card) 44'; Canavan 70'	Report	Daniels (yellow card) 25'; Farquharson (yellow card) 54'	Stadium: Holker Street; Attendance: 3,072; Referee: Lewis Smith

9 December 2023 21	Notts County	1–2	Walsall	Nottingham
15:00 GMT	Baldwin 32' (yellow card) 85'; Cameron (yellow card) 78'	Report	Smith (yellow card) 25'; McEntee 56' (yellow card) 63' (goal) 65'	Stadium: Meadow Lane; Attendance: 11,040; Referee: Dale Baines

16 December 2023 22	Walsall	1–0	Tranmere Rovers	Bescot
15:00 GMT	Daniels (yellow card) 50'; Matt 64' (yellow card) 83'; McEntee (yellow card) 69'; Comley (yellow card) 73'	Report	Belehouan (yellow card) 84'	Stadium: Bescot Stadium; Attendance: 5,190; Referee: Alan Young

23 December 2023 23	Accrington Stanley	2–1	Walsall	Accrington
15:00 GMT	Leigh 9'; Woods (yellow card) 45+3'; Pritchard 57'		Draper 45+4' (pen.)	Stadium: Crown Ground; Attendance: 2,386; Referee: Scott Oldham

26 December 2023 24	Walsall	2–0	Crewe Alexandra	Bescot
15:00 GMT	Hutchinson (yellow card) 8'; Draper 33'; McEntee 61'	Report	White (yellow card) 39'; O'Riordan (yellow card) 54'; Long (yellow card) 71'; Rowe (yellow card) 90+1'; Cooney (yellow card) 90+3'	Stadium: Bescot Stadium; Attendance: 5,672; Referee: Scott Jackson

29 December 2023 25	Walsall	3–1	Wrexham	Bescot
15:00 GMT	Earing 16'; Farquharson (yellow card) 52'; Hutchinson 60'; James-Taylor (yellow card) 76'; Allen 83'; Knowles (yellow card) 90+3'	Report	Mullin 24' (pen.); Cannon (yellow card) 59'	Stadium: Bescot Stadium; Attendance: 8,709; Referee: Paul Howard

1 January 2024 26	Grimsby Town	1–6	Walsall	Cleethorpes
15:00 GMT	Rose 29'	Report	James-Taylor 38'; Hutchinson 43', 55' (pen.); Earing 50'; Farquharson 66'; Allen (yellow card) 71'; Johnson 90+5'	Stadium: Blundell Park; Attendance: 6,355; Referee: Edward Duckworth

13 January 2024 28	Stockport County	3–1	Walsall	Stockport
15:00 GMT	Bristow (yellow card) 29'; Wright 45+2'; Olaofe 55'; Madden 76' (pen.)	Report	Comley (yellow card) 22'; James-Taylor 45+4'	Stadium: Edgeley Park; Attendance: 9,742; Referee: Ben Atkinson

27 January 2024 30	Walsall	1–1	Sutton United	Bescot
15:00 GMT	Okagbue (yellow card) 15'; Daniels 18'; Knowles (yellow card) 62'; Evans (yellow card) 69'; Hutchinson (yellow card) 80'; Comley (yellow card) 90+2'	Report	John (yellow card) 9'; Eastmond 23'; Beautyman (yellow card) 29'; N'Guessan (yellow card) 90+4'	Stadium: Bescot Stadium; Attendance: 5,094; Referee: Ross Joyce

3 February 2024 31	Gillingham	1–1	Walsall	Gillingham
15:00 GMT	Lapslie (yellow card) 40'; Ogie (yellow card) 61'; Masterson 77'; Dieng (yellow card) 89'	Report	Gordon (yellow card) 33'; Okagbue (yellow card) 58'; Hutchinson 62' (pen.)	Stadium: Priestfield Stadium; Attendance: 5,710; Referee: Charles Breakspear

10 February 2024 32	Walsall	0–3	Newport County	Bescot
15:00 GMT	Evans (red card) 86'	Report	Morris 4'; Evans 15'; Charsley 38'	Stadium: Bescot Stadium; Attendance: 5,454; Referee: Lee Swabey

13 February 2024 33	Crawley Town	1–1	Walsall	Crawley
19:45 GMT	Conroy (yellow card) 17'; Williams (yellow card) 21'; Maguire (yellow card) 45'; Kelly 64'	Report	Hutchinson 38' (pen.) (yellow card) 76'; Comley (yellow card) 44'; Smith (yellow card) 81'	Stadium: Broadfield Stadium; Attendance: 2,450; Referee: John Busby

17 February 2024 34	Walsall	2–1	Mansfield Town	Bescot
15:00 GMT	Matt 47'; Adegboyega 65'; Gordon (yellow card) 79'; Knowles (yellow card) 80'	Report	Clarke (yellow card) 37'; Quinn 50'; Bowery (yellow card) 90+4'	Stadium: Bescot Stadium; Attendance: 6,625; Referee: Thomas Parsons

20 February 2024 27	Walsall	3–0	Morecambe	Bescot
19:45 GMT	Tierney 13'; Comley (yellow card) 23'; Matt 26'; Gordon (yellow card) 58'; Knowles (yellow card) 62'; Adegboyega 65'; Earing (yellow card) 90+1'	Report	Stokes (yellow card) 53'; Tutonda (yellow card) 80'	Stadium: Bescot Stadium; Attendance: 4,543; Referee: Carl Brook
Note: Fixture originally scheduled for 6 January and 6 February, but was postponed due to both sides advancing in the FA Cup and a waterlogged pitch respectively.

24 February 2024 35	Harrogate Town	0–2	Walsall	Harrogate
15:00 GMT		Report	Gordon 48' (yellow card) 85'; Earing (yellow card) 67'; Faal 84'	Stadium: Wetherby Road; Attendance: 3,167; Referee: Alex Chilowicz

27 February 2024 29	Walsall	2–1	Accrington Stanley	Bescot
19:45 GMT	Okagbue 60'; Adegboyega 85'; L. Gordon (yellow card) 90+6'; Faal (yellow card) 90+7'	Report	Martin (yellow card) 22'; Nolan 56' (pen.) (yellow card) 87'	Stadium: Bescot Stadium; Attendance: 5,013; Referee: Farai Hallam
Note: Fixture was originally scheduled for 20 January, but was postponed due to a unplayable playing surface.

2 March 2024 36	Walsall	3–1	Doncaster Rovers	Bescot
15:00 GMT	Gordon 18'; Earing 67'; Faal 80'	Report	Hurst 62'; Maxwell (yellow card) 63'; Anderson (yellow card) 71'; Olowu (yellow card) 85'; Waters (yellow card) 89'; Sterry (yellow card) 90+2'	Stadium: Poundland Bescot Stadium; Attendance: 7,118; Referee: Sam Purkiss

9 March 2024 37	Forest Green Rovers	2–0	Walsall	Nailsworth
15:00 GMT	Osadebe 63'; Omotoye (yellow card) 67'; Moore-Taylor (yellow card) 72'; McAllister 81' (pen.); Thompson (yellow card) 84'	Report	Matt (yellow card) 23'; Okagbue (yellow card) 67' (yellow-red card) 72'; Hutchinson (penalty missed) 71'	Stadium: The Bolt New Lawn; Attendance: 2,883; Referee: Thomas Kirk

12 March 2024 38	Walsall	1–1	Barrow	Bescot
19:45 GMT	Menayese 38'; Foulkes (yellow card) 50'; Gordon (yellow card) 77'	Report	Campbell 53' (pen.); Ray (yellow card) 54'	Stadium: Bescot Stadium; Attendance: 4,737; Referee: Martin Woods

16 March 2024 39	Colchester United	1–1	Walsall	Colchester
15:00 GMT	McGeehan 48', (yellow card) 86'; Chilvers (penalty missed) 53'	Report	Allen 37'; Adegboyega (yellow card) 90+1'; Comley (yellow card) 90+4'	Stadium: Colchester Community Stadium; Attendance: 3,704; Referee: David Rock

29 March 2024 41	Milton Keynes Dons	5–0	Walsall	Denbigh
15:00 GMT	Tezgel 28'; Dean 59' (pen.), 78'; Gilbey 62'; Tomlinson 74'	Report	Gordon (yellow card) 68'; Adegboyega (yellow card) 81'	Stadium: Stadium MK; Attendance: 8,121; Referee: Edward Duckworth

1 April 2024 42	Walsall	2–1	Salford City	Bescot
15:00 BST	Matt 9'; Faal 90+2'	Report	Garbutt (yellow card) 41'; Mariappa (yellow card) 50'; Lund 61'	Stadium: Bescot Stadium; Attendance: 6,189; Referee: Daniel Middleton

6 April 2024 43	Tranmere Rovers	1–3	Walsall	Birkenhead
15:00 BST	Hendry 24'; O'Connor (yellow card) 40'; Davies (yellow card) 56'	Report	Stirk (yellow card) 36'; Matt 45+2'; Allen 57'; Comley 68'; Gordon (yellow card) 90+3'	Stadium: Prenton Park; Attendance: 5,849; Referee: Seb Stockbridge

9 April 2024 18	Doncaster Rovers	2–1	Walsall	Doncaster
19:45 BST	Ironside 39'; Adelakun (yellow card) 45+2', (goal) 77'; Biggins (yellow card) 90+2'	Report	Foulkes (yellow card) 37'; Gordon (yellow card) 65'; Hutchinson 90+3'	Stadium: Eco-Power Stadium; Attendance: 6,487; Referee: Ben Speedie
Note: Fixture was originally scheduled for 18 November, but was postponed due to international call-ups.

13 April 2024 44	Walsall	1–3	Notts County	Bescot
15:00 BST	Matt (yellow card) 40'; Comley (yellow card) 43' (yellow-red card) 59'; Tierney (yellow card) 61'; Faal 68'; Hutchinson (yellow card) 90+2'; Foulkes (yellow card) 90+7'	Report	Langstaff 2'; Nemane 28'; Bostock (yellow card) 53'; Austin 69'; Crowley (yellow card) 75'	Stadium: Bescot Stadium; Attendance: 6,576; Referee: Scott Tallis

16 April 2024 40	Walsall	2–1	Swindon Town	Bescot
19:45 BST	Faal 11'; Stirk (yellow card) 87'; Johnson 89'	Report	Glatzel 68'	Stadium: Bescot Stadium; Attendance: 4,709; Referee: Matthew Corlett
Note: Fixture was originally scheduled for 23 March, but was postponed due to international call-ups.

20 April 2024 45	Walsall	2–3	Bradford City	Bescot
15:00 BST	Stirk 7'; Faal 16'; Allen (yellow card) 32'; Knowles (yellow card) 90+5'	Report	Cook 19'; Walker 40', 53', (yellow card) 59' (yellow-red card) 68'; Kelly (yellow card) 45+1'; Wright (yellow card) 67'; Smallwood (yellow card) 90+5'	Stadium: Bescot Stadium; Attendance: 6,656; Referee: Adam Herczeg

27 April 2024 46	AFC Wimbledon	5–1	Walsall	Wimbledon
15:00 BST	Bugiel 9', 34', 52'; Curtis 55'; Faal 62' (o.g.)	Report	Hutchinson 25'; Faal (yellow card) 45+7'	Stadium: Plough Lane; Attendance: 8,623; Referee: Scott Oldham

=== FA Cup ===
Walsall were drawn away to Sheppey United in the first round, to Alfreton Town in the second round and away to Southampton in the third round.

Win Draw Loss Fixtures

3 November 2023 First Round	Sheppey United	1–4	Walsall	Isle of Sheppey
19:45 GMT	Bessey-Saldanha 21'	Report	James-Taylor 32'; Knowles 53'; Tierney 63'; Hutchinson 87'	Stadium: Holm Park; Referee: Tom Reeves

5 December 2023 Second round	Alfreton Town	0–0	Walsall	Alfreton
19:45 GMT	Newall (yellow card) 85'	Report	Knowles (yellow card) 85'; Daniels (yellow card) 90+2'	Stadium: North Street; Referee: Sam Allison
Note: Fixture was originally scheduled for 2 December, but was postponed due to a frozen pitch.

12 December 2023 Second round replay	Walsall	1–0	Alfreton Town	Bescot
19:45 GMT	Matt 6' (yellow card) 45+1'; Comley (yellow card) 29'; Knowles (yellow card) 36'; Stirk (yellow card) 51'; Okagbue (yellow card) 90+1'	Report	Brisley (yellow card) 18'; Newall (yellow card) 30'; Clackstone (yellow card) 75'; Willis (yellow card) 90+6'	Stadium: Bescot Stadium; Attendance: 2,112; Referee: Simon Mather

6 January 2024 Third round	Southampton	4–0	Walsall	Southampton
15:00 GMT	Fraser 6', 68'; Amo-Ameyaw (yellow card) 45+2'; Mara 58'; Adams 78'	Report		Stadium: St Mary's Stadium; Attendance: 22,627; Referee: David Webb

=== EFL Cup ===
Walsall were drawn away to Blackburn Rovers in the first round.

Win Draw Loss Fixtures

8 August 2023 First round	Blackburn Rovers	4–3	Walsall	Blackburn
19:45 BST	Gilsenan 21'; Ennis 40'; Garrett 50'; Buckley 67'	Report	McEntee 19'; Tierney 37'; Johnson (yellow card) 81'; Maher 84'	Stadium: Ewood Park; Attendance: 6,173; Referee: Ben Speedie

=== EFL Trophy ===
In the group stage, Walsall were drawn into Southern Group A alongside Forest Green Rovers, Shrewsbury Town and Brighton & Hove Albion U21.

Pos	Div	Team	Pld	W	PW	PL	L	GF	GA	GD	Pts	Qualification
1	L2	Forest Green Rovers	3	1	1	1	0	4	1	+3	6	Advance to Round 2
2	ACA	Brighton & Hove Albion U21	3	1	1	1	0	3	2	+1	6	Advance to Round 2
3	L1	Shrewsbury Town	3	1	1	0	1	3	5	−2	5	
4	L2	Walsall	3	0	0	1	2	5	7	−2	1	

Updated to match(es) played on 14 November 2023. Source: EFL.com

Win Draw Loss Fixtures

22 August 2023 Group stage	Walsall	2–3	Brighton & Hove Albion U21	Bescot
19:00 BST	McEntee 27'; Allen (yellow card) 83'; Knowles 86' (yellow card) 89'	Report	Moran 13', 33'; McConville (yellow card) 21'; Gordon 65' (o.g.); McGill (yellow card) 90+3'	Stadium: Bescot Stadium; Attendance: 1,780; Referee: Thomas Parsons

10 October 2023 Group stage	Walsall	1–1	Forest Green Rovers	Bescot
19:00 BST	Tierney (penalty missed) 58'; Hutchinson 67'	Report	Maddox (yellow card) 29'; Welch (yellow card) 46'; Omotoye 51'; Lavinier (yellow card) 90+6'	Stadium: Bescot Stadium; Attendance: 1,516; Referee: Stephen Parkinson
	Penalties
	Stirk (penalty missed); James-Taylor (penalty scored); McEntee (penalty scored); Johnson (penalty missed)		Stevens (penalty scored); Taylor (penalty scored); Robson (penalty scored); Bunker (penalty scored)

14 November 2023 Group stage	Shrewsbury Town	3–2	Walsall	Shrewsbury
19:00 GMT	Udoh 32'; Benning 34'; Pierre (yellow card) 48'; Bowman 49'; Burgoyne (yellow card) 61'; Loughran (yellow card) 90+5'	Report	Johnson 6' (penalty missed) 61'; Knowles (yellow card) 33'; McEntee (yellow card) 48'; Griffiths (yellow card) 57'; Hutchinson 73'; James-Taylor (yellow card) 90'	Stadium: New Meadow; Attendance: 1,409; Referee: Ruebyn Ricardo
