= Joe Foulkes =

English footballer (born 2003)

Personal information
- Full name: Joseph James Foulkes
- Date of birth: 23 June 2003 (age 23)
- Place of birth: Dudley, England
- Height: 1.86 m (6 ft 1 in)
- Position: Right back

Team information
- Current team: Grimsby Town
- Number: 12

Youth career
- 2015–2019: Walsall

Senior career*
Years	Team	Apps	(Gls)
2019–2024	Walsall	18	(0)
2021–2022	→ Kidderminster Harriers (loan)	25	(2)
2022–2023	→ Kidderminster Harriers (loan)	32	(1)
2024–2026	Kidderminster Harriers	67	(3)
2026–	Grimsby Town	5	(0)
- * Club domestic league appearances and goals as of 14:03, 6 November 2026 (UTC)

Joseph James Foulkes (born 23 June 2003) is an English professional footballer who plays as a right-back for EFL League Two side Grimsby Town.

== Career ==
=== Walsall ===
Foulkes joined Walsall Foundation's Talented & Gifted Development side at their under–8 level. Foulkes rose through the junior teams before signing for the Walsall Academy during the 2015–16 season. Foulkes would occasionally start for Miguel Llera's under–18s side during the 2019–20 season, before featuring more regularly in the 2020–21 season. Foulkes signed his first professional contract with Walsall on 23 June 2021, agreeing a one-year deal. On 11 May 2022, Walsall confirmed they had triggered a contractual option to extend Foulkes' contract.

==== Kidderminster Harriers (loans) ====
On 30 July 2021, Foulkes joined National League North side, Kidderminster Harriers on loan until January 2022. Foulkes made his debut in a 2–1 win against York City, where he played the full 90 minutes. Foulkes scored his first ever professional goal in a 3–2 loss to Gateshead, before scoring again in the following league game – a 2–1 defeat to AFC Fylde. Foulkes quickly established himself in the team and became a fans favourite, though he would proceed to miss the next two months through an injury. Foulkes would extend his loan until the end of the season, following a good first half of the season. The Kidderminster team would go on to finish inside the play-offs, though would lose 2–1 in the first round against Boston United. Foulkes played 25 times in the league, scoring two goals across the season.

On 6 July 2022, Foulkes returned to Aggborough on a season long loan. He would make 32 appearances in the league stage for Kidderminster, including a 3–0 victory against Kettering Town, where he scored his first and only goal of the season. Kidderminster finished 6th and would win the play-offs, gaining promotion to the National League. Foulkes featured in all three play-off games – a 1–0 victory against Alfreton Town; a 4–1 victory against King's Lynn Town and a 2–0 victory against Brackley Town. Foulkes was also voted, by fans, as Kidderminster Harriers' 2022–23 Young Player of the Season.

==== Breakthrough into Walsall first team ====
On 23 June 2023, Foulkes signed another contract with Walsall, extending his stay with the Saddlers. With starting right wing back, Tom Knowles injured, Foulkes worked his way into the team, making his debut in a 4–3 defeat to Blackburn Rovers in the Carabao Cup, where he assisted Ross Tierney's close range goal. Foulkes made his EFL League Two debut in a 2–1 win against Stockport County.

=== Permanent return to Kidderminster Harriers ===
On 4 July 2024, Foulkes returned to Kidderminster Harriers on a permanent basis.

On 1 June 2026, Kidderminster confirmed that Foulkes would leave the club on expiry of his contract.

=== Grimsby Town ===
On 16 June 2026, it was announced that Foulkes had signed for League Two side Grimsby Town on a one-year deal with an option for a further year. Head coach David Artell stated that Foulkes had been recruited to provide competition for Harvey Rodgers at right-back.

Foulkes made his competitive debut for Grimsby on 19 September, replacing Charles Vernam in the 89th minute of a 2–0 home victory over Crawley Town. He made his first start three days later, playing the full match as a right wing-back in a 2–1 defeat away to Notts County in the EFL Trophy.

Foulkes made his first League Two start on 20 October, playing as part of a three-man defence alongside Rodgers and Maldini Kacurri in a 2–2 draw away to Rochdale.

== Career statistics ==
As of match played 31 October 2026

Appearances and goals by club, season and competition
Club	Season	League			FA Cup		League Cup		Other		Total	
Club	Season	Division	Apps	Goals	Apps	Goals	Apps	Goals	Apps	Goals	Apps	Goals
Walsall	2021–22	League Two	0	0	0	0	0	0	0	0	0	0
Walsall	2022–23	League Two	0	0	0	0	0	0	0	0	0	0
Walsall	2023–24	League Two	18	0	1	0	1	0	3 (Note: Appearance(s) in Football League Trophy)	0	23	0
Walsall	Total		18	0	1	0	1	0	3	0	23	0
Kidderminster Harriers (loan)	2021–22	National League North	25	2	0	0	—		1 (Note: Appearance(s) in FA Trophy)	0	26	2
Kidderminster Harriers (loan)	2022–23	National League North	32	1	0	0	—		6 (Note: Three appearance(s) in FA Trophy and three appearances in National League North play-offs)	0	38	1
Kidderminster Harriers	2024–25	National League North	30	2	4	0	—		3	0	37	2
Kidderminster Harriers	2025–26	National League North	37	1	1	0	—		0	0	38	1
Kidderminster Harriers	Total		124	6	5	0	—		10	0	139	6
Grimsby Town	2026–27	League Two	5	0	0	0	0	0	2	0	7	0
Career total			147	6	6	0	1	0	15	0	169	6

== Honours ==
Kidderminster Harriers

- National League North play-offs: 2022–23, 2025–26

Individual

- Kidderminster Harriers Young Player of the Year: 2022–23
- National League North Team of the Year: 2025–26
