= Ronan Maher =

Ronan Maher may refer to:

- Ronan Maher (hurler) (born 1995), Irish hurler
- Ronan Maher (footballer) (born 2004), Irish footballer
