= Joe Riley (footballer, born 1996) =

English footballer

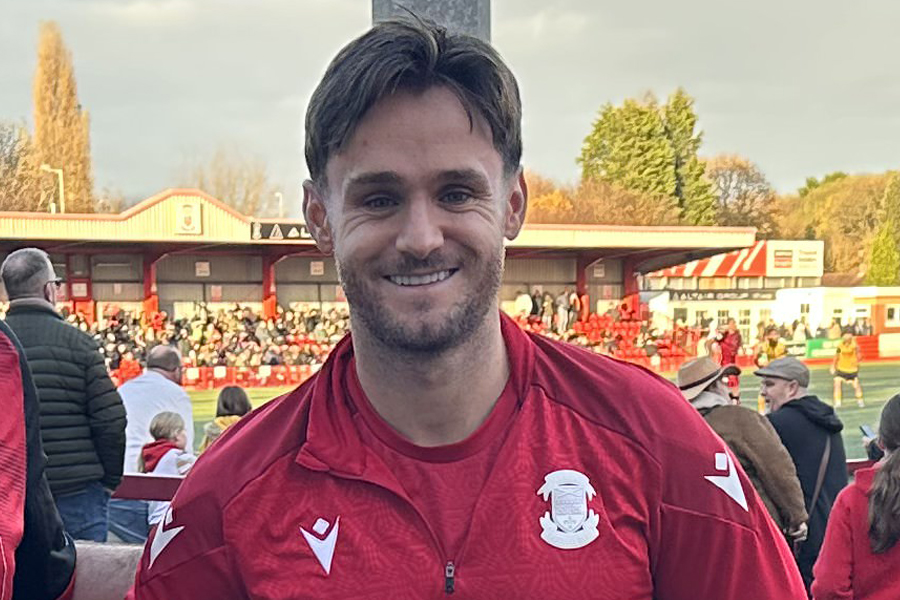
- Riley in November 2025

Personal information
- Full name: Joe Riley
- Date of birth: 6 December 1996 (age 29)
- Place of birth: Blackpool, England
- Height: 5 ft 9 in (1.76 m)
- Positions: Full-back; midfielder

Team information
- Current team: Warrington Rylands

Youth career
- 2013–2016: Manchester United

Senior career*
Years	Team	Apps	(Gls)
2016–2018	Manchester United	0	(0)
2017	→ Sheffield United (loan)	2	(0)
2018–2020	Bradford City	6	(0)
2020–2022	Carlisle United	73	(5)
2022–2024	Walsall	30	(0)
2024–2025	AFC Fylde	40	(1)
2025–2026	Tamworth	22	(1)
2026–	Warrington Rylands	0	(0)
- * Club domestic league appearances and goals as of 20:00, 6 August 2026 (UTC)

Joe Riley (born 6 December 1996) is an English professional footballer who plays as a full-back or midfielder for Northern Premier League Premier Division club Warrington Rylands.

== Club career ==
=== Manchester United ===
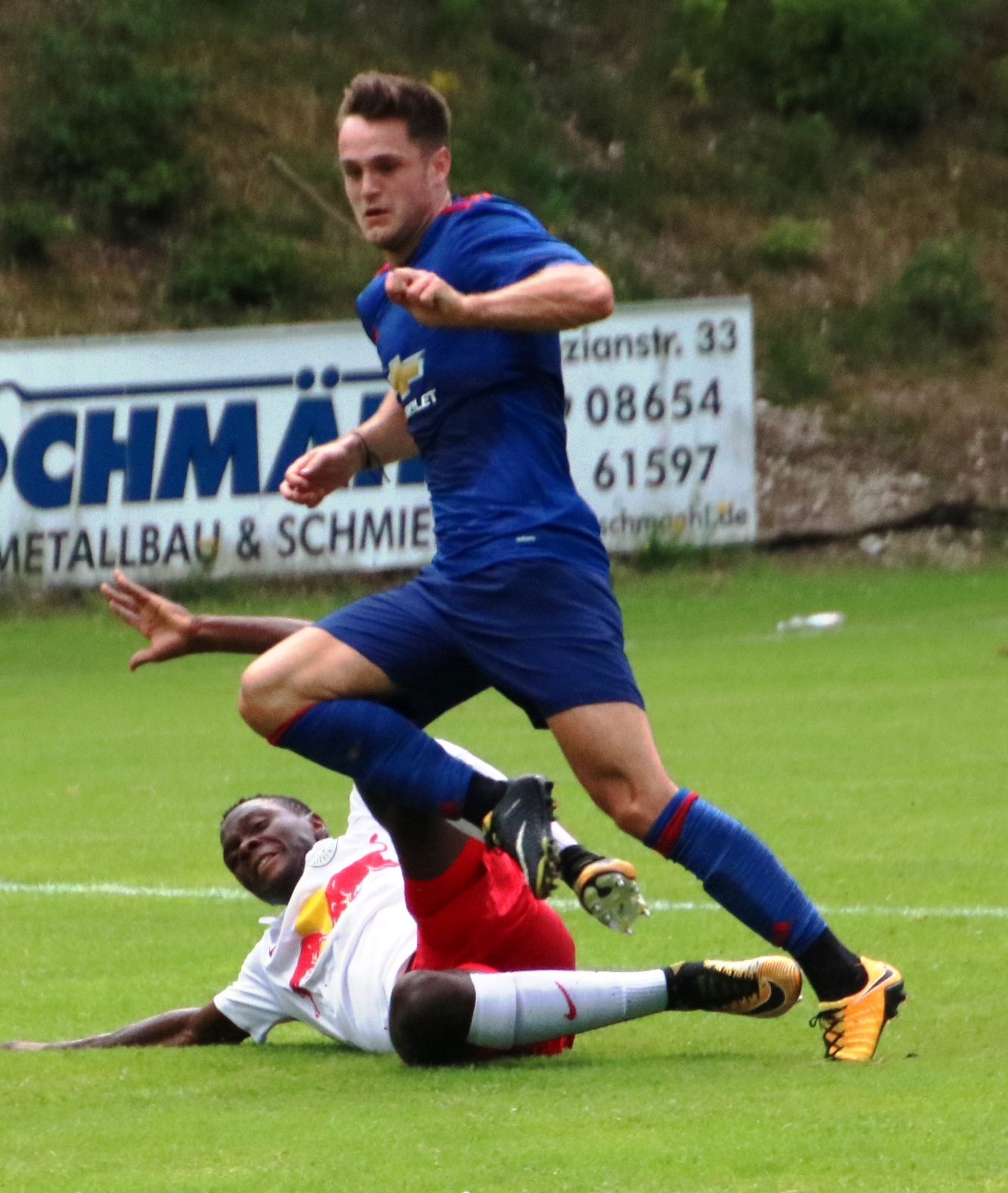
Riley playing for Manchester United against FC Liefering in July 2017.

Born in Blackpool, Lancashire, Riley joined Manchester United as a midfielder before being converted into a left-back for the under-21 team.

He was first included in a senior matchday squad on 18 February 2016 as his team lost 2–1 away to Danish club Midtjylland in the first leg of the last 32 of the UEFA Europa League. He made his senior debut four days later, when he came on as a half-time substitute for Cameron Borthwick-Jackson against Shrewsbury Town in a 3–0 win at New Meadow in the fifth round of 2015–16 FA Cup. On 25 February 2016, because of Chris Smalling's shoulder injury, Riley made his first start in a 5–1 home rout of Midtjylland in the UEFA Europa League last 32 second leg, the same game Marcus Rashford made his debut.

Riley appeared in the matchday squad a number of times over the rest of the season but did not make another appearance for the club.

==== Sheffield United (loan) ====
On 17 January 2017, Riley joined League One club Sheffield United on loan until the end of the 2016–17 season. He made two appearances for The Blades before his season was ended early after dislocating his shoulder in a "freak accident" in training.

=== Bradford City ===
On 25 May 2018, Riley signed a two-year contract with Bradford City. On 26 May 2020 it was announced that he was one of 10 players who would leave Bradford City when their contract expired on 30 June 2020.

=== Carlisle United ===
On 5 August 2020, Riley joined League Two side Carlisle United on a one-year deal with an option of an additional year.

=== Walsall ===
On 13 June 2022, Riley joined Walsall on a two-year contract, active from 1 July upon the expiration of his contract with Carlisle.

Following the conclusion of the 2023–24 season, Riley was announced to be leaving the club upon the expiration of his contract.

=== AFC Fylde ===
On 5 June 2024, Riley agreed to join National League side AFC Fylde on a one-year deal with the option for a further season.

=== Tamworth ===
On 29 June 2025, Riley returned to the National League following AFC Fylde's relegation, joining Tamworth. Riley made his National League debut for Tamworth on 9 August 2025, he started the opening day fixture at home to Scunthorpe United. coming on as a 56th minute substitute for Ben Milnes. Tamworth lost the match 2–1. Riley scored once for Tamworth in the National League on 13 September 2025, in an away fixture against Sutton United, scoring from the penalty spot on the 12th minute in a 3–2 victory. He went on to make 22 appearances for Tamworth, scoring a single goal.

=== Warrington Rylands ===
Riley signed for Northern Premier League Premier Division side Warrington Rylands on 7 July 2026. After joining Warrington Rylands, he moved from full-time football to part-time football and also works as a financial protection advisor.

== Career statistics ==
As of end of 2024–25 season

Appearances and goals by club, season and competition
Club	Season	League			FA Cup		League Cup		Other		Total	
Club	Season	Division	Apps	Goals	Apps	Goals	Apps	Goals	Apps	Goals	Apps	Goals
Manchester United	2015–16	Premier League	0	0	1	0	0	0	1 (Note: Appearance in UEFA Europa League)	0	2	0
Manchester United	2016–17	Premier League	0	0	0	0	0	0	0	0	0	0
Manchester United	2017–18	Premier League	0	0	0	0	0	0	0	0	0	0
Manchester United	Total		0	0	1	0	0	0	1	0	2	0
Sheffield United (loan)	2016–17	League One	2	0	—		—		—		2	0
Bradford City	2018–19	League One	6	0	0	0	1	0	1 (Note: Appearance(s) in EFL Trophy)	0	8	0
Bradford City	2019–20	League Two	0	0	0	0	0	0	0	0	0	0
Bradford City	Total		6	0	0	0	1	0	1	0	8	0
Carlisle United	2020–21	League Two	42	2	2	0	1	0	2	0	47	2
Carlisle United	2021–22	League Two	31	3	1	0	1	0	4	0	37	3
Carlisle United	Total		73	5	3	0	2	0	6	0	84	5
Walsall	2022–23	League Two	14	0	0	0	0	0	0	0	14	0
Walsall	2023–24	League Two	16	0	1	0	1	0	1	0	19	0
Walsall	Total		30	0	1	0	1	0	1	0	33	0
AFC Fylde	2024–25	National League	40	1	1	0	—		1 (Note: Appearance(s) in FA Trophy)	0	42	1
Career total			151	5	6	0	4	0	10	0	185	6
