= Owen Evans (Welsh footballer) =

Welsh footballer (born 1996)

Personal information
- Full name: Owen Rhys Evans
- Date of birth: 28 November 1996 (age 29)
- Place of birth: Newport, Wales
- Height: 6 ft 2 in (1.88 m)
- Position: Goalkeeper

Team information
- Current team: Altrincham
- Number: 1

Youth career
- –2014: Hereford United
- 2014–2015: Wigan Athletic

Senior career*
Years	Team	Apps	(Gls)
2015–2021	Wigan Athletic	1	(0)
2016	→ Witton Albion (loan)	5	(0)
2016	→ Rhyl (loan)	20	(0)
2017	→ North Ferriby United (loan)	6	(0)
2018	→ Sutton United (loan)	2	(0)
2019–2020	→ Macclesfield Town (loan)	24	(0)
2020	→ Cheltenham Town (loan)	11	(0)
2021–2022	Cheltenham Town	27	(0)
2022–2024	Walsall	70	(0)
2024–2025	Cheltenham Town	11	(0)
2025	→ Barnet (loan)	18	(0)
2025–2026	Barnet	3	(0)
2026–	Altrincham	0	(0)

International career
2013–2014	Wales U19	4	(0)
2018	Wales U21	3	(0)
- * Club domestic league appearances and goals as of 18:47, 2 May 2026 (UTC)

Owen Rhys Evans (born 28 November 1996) is a Welsh professional footballer who plays as a goalkeeper for National League club Altrincham.

== Club career ==
=== Wigan Athletic ===
On 12 February 2016, Evans joined Witton Albion on a month-long loan.

Evans made his professional debut for Wigan in a 2–1 victory against Blackpool in the second round of the 2017–18 EFL Cup.

On 3 January 2018, Evans joined National League club Sutton United on loan.

In June 2019, Evans signed a new two-year contract with the club. On 25 July 2019, Evans went out on loan again, this time joining League Two side Macclesfield Town on a season-long loan deal.

After his spell at Macclesfield was cut short, Evans signed for Cheltenham Town on 9 January 2020 on loan for the rest of the 2019–20 season.

He joined Cheltenham permanently on a two-year contract in June 2021.

=== Walsall ===
In June 2022 Evans signed for Walsall on a two-year contract, for an undisclosed fee.

Following the conclusion of the 2023–24 season, Walsall confirmed that Evans would depart the club upon the expiration of his contract.

=== Return to Cheltenham Town ===
On 3 July 2024, Evans returned to League Two side Cheltenham Town ahead of their first season back in the fourth tier following relegation the previous season, reuniting with manager Michael Flynn whom had brought the goalkeeper to Walsall.

On 2 January 2025, Evans joined National League side Barnet on loan for the remainder of the season.

=== Barnet ===
Evans joined Barnet on a permanent basis for the 2025-26 season, making a further six appearances for the club.

=== Altrincham ===
Evans signed for Altrincham on a permanent deal on 1 July 2026.

== International career ==
Evans was named in Wales Under-21 squad for the 2019 UEFA European Under-21 Championship Group 8 matches against Switzerland on 1 September 2017 and Portugal on 5 September 2017.

== Career statistics ==
As of end of 2025-2026 season

Appearances and goals by club, season and competition
Club	Season	League			National Cup		League Cup		Other		Total	
Club	Season	Division	Apps	Goals	Apps	Goals	Apps	Goals	Apps	Goals	Apps	Goals
Wigan Athletic	2015–16	League One	0	0	0	0	0	0	0	0	0	0
Wigan Athletic	2016–17	Championship	0	0	0	0	0	0	0	0	0	0
Wigan Athletic	2017–18	League One	0	0	0	0	1	0	0	0	1	0
Wigan Athletic	2018–19	Championship	0	0	0	0	0	0	0	0	0	0
Wigan Athletic	2019–20	Championship	0	0	0	0	0	0	0	0	0	0
Wigan Athletic	2020–21	League One	1	0	1	0	0	0	3 (Note: Appearances in EFL Trophy)	0	5	0
Wigan Athletic	Total		1	0	1	0	1	0	3	0	6	0
Witton Albion (loan)	2015–16	Northern Premier League Division One North	5	0	—		—		—		5	0
Rhyl (loan)	2016–17	Welsh Premier League	20	0	1	0	3	0	0	0	24	0
North Ferriby United (loan)	2016–17	National League	6	0	0	0	—		0	0	6	0
Sutton United (loan)	2017–18	National League	2	0	0	0	—		2 (Note: Appearances in FA Trophy)	0	4	0
Macclesfield Town (loan)	2019–20	League Two	24	0	1	0	2	0	0	0	27	0
Cheltenham Town (loan)	2019–20	League Two	11	0	0	0	0	0	2 (Note: Appearances in League Two playoffs)	0	13	0
Cheltenham Town	2021–22	League One	27	0	0	0	2	0	3	0	32	0
Walsall	2022–23	League Two	45	0	4	0	2	0	2	0	53	0
Walsall	2023–24	League Two	25	0	1	0	0	0	0	0	26	0
Walsall	Total		70	0	5	0	2	0	2	0	79	0
Cheltenham Town	2024–25	League Two	11	0	0	0	0	0	0	0	11	0
Barnet (loan)	2024–25	National League	18	0	0	0	0	0	1	0	19	0
Barnet	2025–26	League Two	3	0	1	0	0	0	2	0	6	0
Career total			198	0	9	0	10	0	15	0	232	0

== Honours ==
Barnet

- National League: 2024–25
