= Isaac Hutchinson =

English footballer (born 2000)

Personal information
- Full name: Isaac Hutchinson
- Date of birth: 10 April 2000 (age 26)
- Place of birth: Eastbourne, England
- Height: 5 ft 10 in (1.78 m)
- Position: Midfielder

Team information
- Current team: Doncaster Rovers
- Number: 21

Youth career
- Ratton Rangers
- 2010–2018: Brighton & Hove Albion

Senior career*
Years	Team	Apps	(Gls)
2018–2020	Southend United	32	(1)
2020–2022	Derby County	1	(0)
2021	→ Forest Green Rovers (loan)	10	(0)
2022	→ Crawley Town (loan)	19	(2)
2022–2024	Walsall	90	(19)
2024–2026	Bristol Rovers	45	(5)
2025–2026	→ Cheltenham Town (loan)	17	(5)
2026	→ Cheltenham Town (loan)	17	(10)
2026–	Doncaster Rovers	14	(2)
- * Club domestic league appearances and goals as of 13:22, 22 November 2026 (UTC)

Isaac Hutchinson (born 10 April 2000) is an English professional footballer who plays as a midfielder for EFL League One club Doncaster Rovers.

== Early and personal life ==
Born in Eastbourne, Hutchinson attended Cavendish School.

His brother Jake is also a professional footballer.

== Career ==
=== Southend United ===
Hutchinson began his career with Ratton Rangers. After eight years with Brighton & Hove Albion, Hutchinson joined Southend United in the summer of 2018 following a trial, turning down a move to Sparta Prague in the process. He made his senior debut on 4 September 2018 in the EFL Trophy, scoring a goal. He made his Football League debut on 15 December 2018.

=== Derby County ===
Hutchinson signed a two-year deal with Derby County on 2 October 2020, joining the club's under-23 side. He made his senior debut for the club in an FA Cup defeat to Chorley on 9 January 2021, captaining the side, before joining League Two side Forest Green Rovers on loan for the remainder of the 2020–21 season two days later. He made 10 appearances on loan at Forest Green.

Hutchinson made his league debut for Derby as a substitute in a 1–1 draw with Huddersfield Town in the opening match of the 2021–22 season on 7 August 2021. He scored his first goal for the club in an EFL Cup tie against Salford City on 10 August 2021.

On 31 January 2022, Hutchinson joined League Two club Crawley Town on loan until the end of the season.

=== Walsall ===
In June 2022 it was announced that he would join Walsall on 1 July 2022.

On 14 October 2023, Hutchinson scored a first career hat-trick in a 4–1 victory over Gillingham, later describing it as the "best day" of his life. He was Walsall's Player of the Year for the 2023–24 season.

=== Bristol Rovers ===
On 24 June 2024, Hutchinson signed for Bristol Rovers on a three-year deal with the option for a further season, the League One club having triggered the compensation release clause in his contract. On 20 August 2024, his third appearance of the season, he scored his first goal for the club, opening the scoring from the edge of the box in a 3–3 EFL Trophy Group Stage draw with Tottenham Hotspur U21. Having struggled for game time in the early months of the season, the replacement of manager Matt Taylor with Iñigo Calderón in December 2024 saw Hutchinson begin to feature more regularly.

==== Cheltenham Town (loans) ====
On 1 September 2025, Hutchinson joined League Two club Cheltenham Town on a season-long loan. Following the move, Hutchinson and his family were subjected to abuse from a portion of the Bristol Rovers fanbase. On 6 September he made his debut for the club, scoring a free-kick just one minute into the match in a 1–0 victory over Accrington Stanley.

Hutchinson impressed across the first-half of the season with Cheltenham, scoring seven goals in his first fourteen appearances. With his parent club struggling, ending 2025 just one point above the League Two relegation zone, new Bristol Rovers manager Steve Evans confirmed his intention to recall Hutchinson upon the opening of the January transfer window. However, Hutchinson stated that he wanted to remain with Cheltenham for the remainder of the season.

On 6 January 2026, he was officially recalled by his parent club. He returned on loan to Cheltenham Town in February 2026. After continuing his impressive form with the club over the second-half of the season, he was named in the League Two Team of the Season.

Following the conclusion of the 2025–26 season, Hutchinson was named as one of seven players available to depart Bristol Rovers on either a permanent or loan transfer.

=== Doncaster Rovers ===
On 20 July 2026, Hutchinson signed for League One club Doncaster Rovers on a two-year deal for an undisclosed six-figure fee, with the option for a further year.

Hutchinson made his Doncaster debut on 8 August 2026, against Stockport County in the EFL Cup. Hutchinson scored his first goal for the club on 25 August 2026, against Middlesbrough in the EFL Cup.

== Career statistics ==
As of match played 21 November 2026

Appearances and goals by club, season and competition
Club	Season	League			FA Cup		League Cup		Other		Total	
Club	Season	Division	Apps	Goals	Apps	Goals	Apps	Goals	Apps	Goals	Apps	Goals
Southend United	2018–19	League One	8	0	0	0	0	0	4 (Note: Appearance(s) in EFL Trophy.)	1	12	1
Southend United	2019–20	League One	22	1	1	0	1	0	1	0	25	1
Southend United	2020–21	League Two	2	0	0	0	1	0	0	0	3	0
Southend United	Total		32	1	1	0	2	0	5	1	40	2
Derby County	2020–21	Championship	0	0	1	0	0	0	0	0	1	0
Derby County	2021–22	Championship	1	0	0	0	2	1	0	0	3	1
Derby County	Total		1	0	1	0	2	1	0	0	4	1
Forest Green Rovers (loan)	2020–21	League Two	10	0	0	0	0	0	0	0	10	0
Crawley Town (loan)	2021–22	League Two	19	2	0	0	0	0	0	0	19	2
Walsall	2022–23	League Two	44	7	4	1	2	0	3	0	53	8
Walsall	2023–24	League Two	46	12	4	1	1	0	2	2	53	15
Walsall	Total		90	19	8	2	3	0	5	2	106	23
Bristol Rovers	2024–25	League One	37	4	3	0	0	0	3	2	43	6
Bristol Rovers	2025–26	League Two	8	1	0	0	1	0	2	1	11	2
Bristol Rovers	Total		45	5	3	0	1	0	5	3	54	8
Cheltenham Town (loan)	2025–26	League Two	34	15	2	3	0	0	0	0	36	18
Doncaster Rovers	2026–27	League One	14	2	1	0	2	1	3	1	20	4
Career total			245	44	16	5	10	2	18	7	289	58

== Honours ==
Individual

- Walsall Supporters' Player of the Season: 2023–24
- Walsall Goal of the Season: 2023–24
- EFL League Two Team of the Season: 2025–26
