= Rollin Menayese =

Welsh footballer (born 1997)

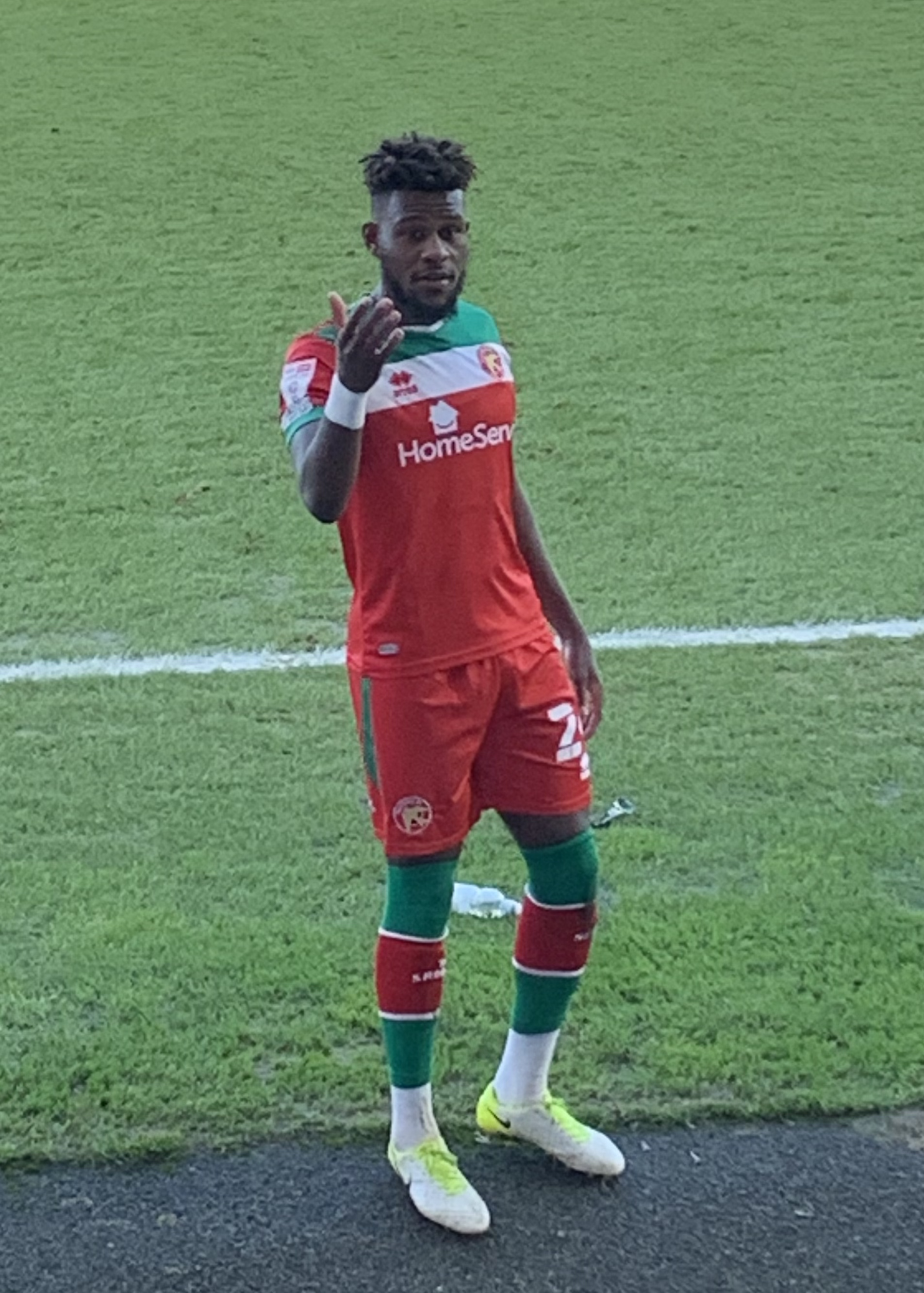
- Menayese playing for Walsall FC in 2024

Personal information
- Full name: Rollin Menayese
- Date of birth: 4 December 1997 (age 28)
- Place of birth: Kinshasa, DR Congo
- Height: 1.90 m (6 ft 3 in)
- Position: Defender

Team information
- Current team: Worksop Town

Youth career
- –2016: Cardiff City

Senior career*
Years	Team	Apps	(Gls)
2016–2017	Weston-super-Mare	20	(0)
2017–2020	Bristol Rovers	16	(0)
2018	→ Swindon Town (loan)	14	(0)
2019	→ Aldershot Town (loan)	16	(0)
2020–2022	Mansfield Town	10	(1)
2021	→ Grimsby Town (loan)	21	(0)
2021–2022	→ Walsall (loan)	19	(0)
2022–2024	Walsall	15	(2)
2022–2023	→ Hartlepool United (loan)	18	(2)
2024	→ Aldershot Town (loan)	6	(0)
2024–2025	Aldershot Town	13	(0)
2025–2026	Macclesfield	49	(2)
2026–	Worksop Town	0	(0)

International career
2012–2014	Wales U17	5	(0)
- * Club domestic league appearances and goals as of 21:48, 22 May 2026 (UTC)

Rollin Menayese (born 4 December 1997) is a professional footballer who plays as a defender for National League North club Worksop Town.

Having begun his career with Non-League side Weston-super-Mare, he has gone on to feature professionally for Bristol Rovers, Swindon Town, Mansfield Town, Grimsby Town, Hartlepool United and Walsall.

== Early life ==
Menayese was born in the Democratic Republic of the Congo, and attended St Joseph's Roman Catholic High School in Newport. As a schoolboy, he played rugby league and helped his school to win a national final, scoring five tries and kicking five goals (totalling 30 points) in the match at the Twickenham Stoop.

== Career ==
=== Weston-super-Mare ===
Menayese began his career in the youth academy at Cardiff City along with his twin brother Elvis. Following his release by Cardiff, he signed for Weston-super-Mare in December 2016. He made 23 appearances for the Seagulls in the second half of the 2016–17 season.

=== Bristol Rovers ===
On the 1 June 2017, Menayese joined Bristol Rovers, initially joining up with the u23 squad. He made his first professional appearance for Rovers in the EFL Trophy, coming off the bench to replace an injured Jonathan Burn in a 5–1 victory over Wycombe Wanderers. On 7 October 2017, with both Tom Lockyer and Ryan Sweeney on international duty Menayese made his first league start in a 6–0 away victory over Northampton Town. He made his second appearance for the club when Lockyer and Sweeney were again on International Duty in a late 1–0 away defeat to Scunthorpe United and then came off the bench to replace Chris Lines in the 68th minute of a 3–1 away victory at Doncaster Rovers on 27 January 2018, 4 days before he joined Swindon on loan.

On 31 January 2018, Menayese joined League Two side Swindon Town on loan for the remainder of the campaign. He made his debut for the club on 3 February 2018, coming off the bench in a dramatic 2–2 draw with Lincoln City. He came on to replace striker Luke Norris in the 24th minute of the match.

On 1 February 2019, Menayese joined National League side Aldershot Town on loan until the end of the season.

At the end of the 2018–19 season, Bristol Rovers exercised a contract extension for him.

On 1 June 2020 after somewhat of a breakthrough season, Menayese signed a one-year contract extension.

=== Mansfield Town ===
On 28 July 2020, Menayese re-joined former manager Graham Coughlan at Mansfield Town, joining for an undisclosed fee. Menayese made his debut for the club on 5 September 2020 in a 4–0 EFL Cup defeat to Preston North End and made his league debut the following week on the opening day of the season, playing the duration of a 0–0 draw with Tranmere Rovers. On 26 September 2020, Menayese scored his first goal for the club and the first of his career, opening the scoring in a 2–1 home defeat to Exeter City. He played fourteen games in total for Mansfield, including 10 league games. He scored twice, once in the aforementioned Exeter City game, and once in a 3–1 home defeat to Lincoln City.

On 18 January 2021, Menayese joined League Two club Grimsby Town on loan for the rest of the 2020–21 season. He started the next game, against fierce rivals, Scunthorpe United. He played the full 90 minutes in a 3–0 defeat. He started every game for Grimsby, except a 2–2 draw against his parent club. Grimsby finished bottom and were relegated to the National League.

=== Walsall ===
On 16 July 2021, Menayese joined Walsall on a season-long loan. He made his debut for Walsall in a 0–0 draw against Doncaster Rovers in the EFL Cup. He played the full 90 minutes, but did not take a penalty in the penalty shootout. He made his league debut in a 1–1 draw against Scunthorpe. He played a further 23 games (25 in total) while on loan at Walsall.

On 4 January 2022, following a successful loan spell, Walsall made the loan a permanent transfer. Menayese signed a contract until 2024.

==== Hartlepool United (loan) ====
On 18 July 2022, Menayese joined fellow League Two club Hartlepool United on a season-long loan deal. On 9 December 2022, he scored his first goal for Hartlepool in a 2–0 win at Crawley Town. Menayese followed this up by scoring again, on Boxing Day, in a 2–1 win at Rochdale. In January 2023, Menayese was ruled out for the rest of the season due to an ankle injury following a strong challenge in a defeat to Carlisle United.

==== Aldershot Town (loan) ====
On 25 January 2024, Menayese returned to National League club Aldershot Town on loan for the remainder of the season.

==== Return to Walsall ====
On 12 March 2024, Menayese was recalled from his loan spell. He went straight into the starting-eleven for that evening's match, opening the scoring in an eventual 1–1 draw with Barrow. He was released at the end of the season.

=== Aldershot Town ===
On 22 August 2024, Menayese returned to Aldershot Town on a permanent basis.

On 5 January 2025, it was announced that Menayese had left the club following the expiry of his contract.

=== Macclesfield ===
On 17 January 2025, Menayese joined Northern Premier League Premier Division side Macclesfield. On 22 March 2025, he was brought on as a second-half substitute as Macclesfield defeated Bamber Bridge 2–1 to be crowned champions. Following promotion, he signed a new contract for the following season. Menayese helped Macclesfield FC knock the trophy holders, Crystal Palace out of the FA Cup

He was released by the Silkmen following the conclusion of the 2025–26 season.

=== Worksop Town ===
On 27 July 2026, Menayese joined National League North club Worksop Town.

== Career statistics ==
As of match played 29 April 2026

Appearances and goals by club, season and competition
Club	Season	League			FA Cup		League Cup		Other		Total	
Club	Season	Division	Apps	Goals	Apps	Goals	Apps	Goals	Apps	Goals	Apps	Goals
Weston-super-Mare	2016–17	National League South	20	0	0	0	—		0	0	20	0
Bristol Rovers	2017–18	League One	3	0	0	0	0	0	1 (Note: Appearance in the EFL Trophy)	0	4	0
Bristol Rovers	2018–19	League One	0	0	0	0	0	0	1	0	1	0
Bristol Rovers	2019–20	League One	13	0	5	0	0	0	5	0	23	0
Bristol Rovers	Total		16	0	5	0	0	0	7	0	28	0
Swindon Town (loan)	2017–18	League Two	14	0	0	0	0	0	0	0	14	0
Aldershot Town (loan)	2018–19	National League	16	0	0	0	—		0	0	16	0
Mansfield Town	2020–21	League Two	10	1	0	0	1	0	3	1	14	2
Mansfield Town	2021–22	League Two	0	0	0	0	0	0	0	0	0	0
Mansfield Town	Total		10	1	0	0	1	0	3	1	14	2
Grimsby Town (loan)	2020–21	League Two	21	0	0	0	0	0	0	0	21	0
Walsall	2021–22	League Two	33	1	2	0	1	0	3	0	39	1
Walsall	2022–23	League Two	0	0	0	0	0	0	0	0	0	0
Walsall	2023–24	League Two	1	1	1	0	0	0	1	0	3	1
Walsall	Total		29	1	3	0	1	0	4	0	37	1
Hartlepool United (loan)	2022–23	League Two	18	2	2	0	1	0	2	0	23	2
Aldershot Town (loan)	2023–24	National League	6	0	0	0	—		0	0	6	0
Aldershot Town	2024–25	National League	13	0	2	0	—		1 (Note: Appearance in the National League Cup)	0	16	0
Macclesfield	2024–25	Northern Premier League Premier Division	14	2	0	0	—		0	0	14	2
Macclesfield	2025–26	National League North	35	0	5	1	—		4	0	44	1
Macclesfield	Total		49	2	5	1	0	0	4	0	58	1
Career total			217	7	17	1	3	0	21	1	258	9

== Honours ==
Macclesfield

- Northern Premier League Premier Division: 2024–25
