= Ronan Maher (footballer) =

Irish footballer (born 2004)

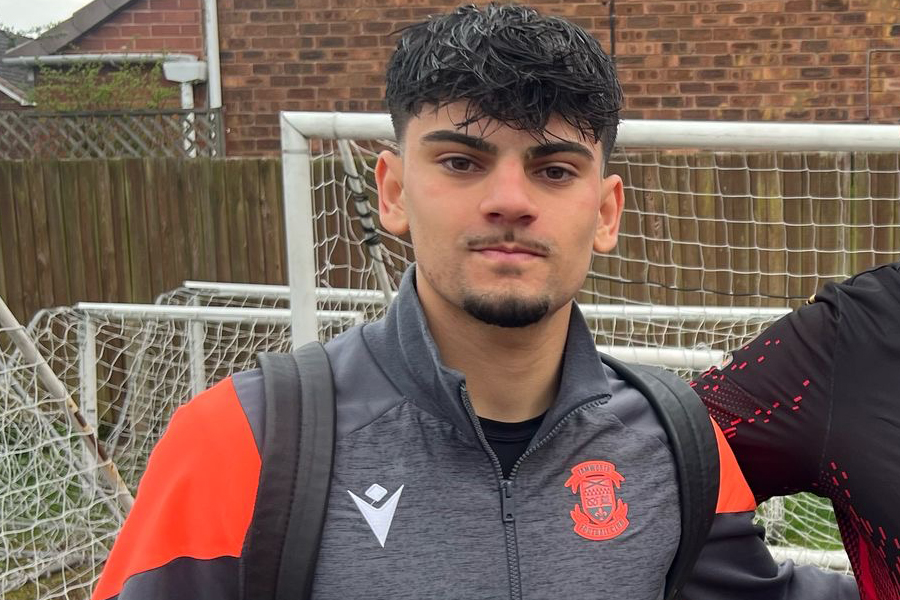
- Maher in March 2025

Personal information
- Full name: Ronan Arjun Maher
- Date of birth: 30 December 2004 (age 21)
- Place of birth: Birmingham, England
- Height: 5 ft 7 in (1.70 m)
- Position: Midfielder

Team information
- Current team: Wealdstone (on loan from Walsall)
- Number: 31

Youth career
- 2011–2015: West Bromwich Albion
- 2015–2022: Walsall

Senior career*
Years	Team	Apps	(Gls)
2022–	Walsall	15	(0)
2023–2024	→ Rushall Olympic (loan)	25	(4)
2024–2025	→ Tamworth (loan)	13	(2)
2025–2026	→ Tamworth (loan)	16	(2)
2026–	→ Wealdstone (loan)	6	(1)

International career^{‡}
2022	Republic of Ireland U19	2	(0)
2025	Republic of Ireland U21	2	(0)
- * Club domestic league appearances and goals as of 16:58, 10 November 2026 (UTC) ‡ National team caps and goals as of 00:27, 18 November 2026 (UTC)

Ronan Arjun Maher (born 30 December 2004) is a professional footballer who plays as a midfielder for Wealdstone on loan from EFL League Two club Walsall. Born in England, he represents the Republic of Ireland at youth level.

== Club career ==
Maher played futsal at an early age, and played football at West Bromwich Albion for four years before being released at under-11 level. He then joined Walsall at the age of eleven and was the under-18 team's top-scorer during the 2021–22 campaign. He made his first-team debut on the opening day of the 2022–23 season on 30 July 2022, coming on as an 80th-minute substitute in a 4–0 win over Hartlepool United at the Bescot Stadium. He signed a three-year professional contract the following month.

He scored his first professional goal for Walsall on 8 August 2023 in a 3–4 EFL Cup first round defeat to Blackburn Rovers at Ewood Park.

On 25 August 2023, Maher signed for National League North side Rushall Olympic on a youth loan until 6 January 2024. Maher made his debut for The Pics on the following day in a 1–1 draw with Banbury United. He was recalled from his loan spell on 7 November 2023 before returning to Rushall, on a loan deal to the end of the season, on 26 January 2024.

On 22 November 2024, Maher joined National League side Tamworth on a one-month loan deal. He scored Tamworth's 94th-minute equaliser in their second round FA Cup encounter at Burton Albion, sending the game to penalties which Tamworth went on to win 4–3. He was recalled in April 2025.

On 20 June 2025, Walsall announced he had signed a new two-year deal.

On 4 October 2025, Maher returned to National League club Tamworth on a youth-loan until 29 December.

On 25 September 2026, Maher signed for National League side Wealdstone on a three-month loan deal. He made his debut the following day in a 4–0 win over Gateshead.

== International career ==
Maher made his debut for the Republic of Ireland under-19 team in a 6–0 win over Gibraltar on 21 September 2022. He started in the following game, a 2023 UEFA European Under-19 Championship qualification match with Wales, which ended in a 2–0 victory for the Irish. Walsall manager Michael Flynn said that he was "very proud of Ronan".

On 13 March 2025, Maher received his first Republic of Ireland U21 call up for their friendlies against Scotland U21 & Hungary U21 in Spain. He made his debut for the side against Scotland U21 on 21 March, in a 2–0 defeat.

== Personal life ==
Born in England, Maher is of Irish and Indian descent.

== Career statistics ==
As of match played 7 November 2026

Appearances and goals by club, season and competition
Club	Season	League			FA Cup		League Cup (Note: Includes EFL Cup & National League Cup)		Other		Total	
Club	Season	Division	Apps	Goals	Apps	Goals	Apps	Goals	Apps	Goals	Apps	Goals
Walsall	2022–23	League Two	10	0	1	0	2	0	2 (Note: Appearance(s) in the EFL Trophy)	0	15	0
Walsall	2023–24	League Two	3	0	0	0	1	1	2	0	6	1
Walsall	2024–25	League Two	2	0	0	0	3	0	3	0	8	0
Walsall	2025–26	League Two	0	0	0	0	1	0	3	0	4	0
Walsall	2026–27	League Two	0	0	0	0	0	0	0	0	0	0
Walsall	Total		15	0	1	0	7	1	10	0	33	1
Rushall Olympic (loan)	2023–24	National League North	25	4	2	0	—		7 (Note: Appearances in the Staffordshire Senior Cup and Walsall Senior Cup)	4	34	8
Tamworth (loan)	2024–25	National League	13	2	1	1	—		1 (Note: Appearance(s) in the FA Trophy)	0	15	3
Tamworth (loan)	2025–26	National League	17	2	1	0	4	2	2	0	25	4
Wealdstone (loan)	2026–27	National League	6	1	2	1	0	0	0	0	8	2
Career total			76	9	7	2	11	3	20	4	115	18

== Honours ==
Rushall Olympic

- Staffordshire Senior Cup: 2023–24
- Walsall Senior Cup: 2023–24
