= Douglas James-Taylor =

English footballer (born 2001)

Personal information
- Full name: Douglas Edward James-Taylor
- Date of birth: 18 November 2001 (age 24)
- Place of birth: Camden, England
- Position: Forward

Team information
- Current team: Bohemians
- Number: 18

Youth career
- 2018–2020: Salford City
- 2020–2021: Stoke City

Senior career*
Years	Team	Apps	(Gls)
2019–2020	Salford City	0	(0)
2021–2023	Stoke City	0	(0)
2022	→ Wealdstone (loan)	4	(0)
2022	→ AFC Fylde (loan)	10	(2)
2022–2023	→ Walsall (loan)	22	(1)
2023–2025	Walsall	26	(2)
2024–2025	→ Drogheda United (loan)	27	(8)
2025–	Bohemians	34	(11)
- * Club domestic league appearances and goals as of 18:01, 31 October 2026 (UTC)

Douglas Edward James-Taylor (born 18 November 2001) is an English professional footballer who plays as a forward for League of Ireland Premier Division club Bohemians.

== Club career ==
=== Salford City ===
James-Taylor grew up in Altrincham where he attended Altrincham Grammar School for Boys. He began his football career with Salford City and was a prolific goalscorer for their under-18s which saw him make his senior debut in a FA Trophy game at Maidstone United.

=== Stoke City ===
He joined the Stoke City U23s in September 2020. He gained first team experience in the second half of the 2021–22 season playing four times for Wealdstone and ten times for AFC Fylde, scoring twice.

=== Walsall ===
On 1 July 2022, James-Taylor joined Walsall on loan for the 2022–23 season. He made his Football League debut on 30 July 2022 in a 4–0 victory against Hartlepool United. He scored his first EFL goal of his career on 1 January 2023 in a 2–1 win against Mansfield Town. James-Taylor made 30 appearances for Walsall, scoring twice as the Saddlers finished in 16th position. He was released by Stoke at the end of the 2022–23 season.

On 28 June 2023, he returned to Walsall on a permanent basis, signing a one-year deal with the option for a further year.

==== Drogheda United loan ====
On 22 May 2024, it was announced that James-Taylor would join Walsall's sister club Drogheda United of the League of Ireland Premier Division, on a one-year loan, upon the opening of the transfer window on 1 July 2024. He scored his first career hat-trick against Wilton United in the FAI Cup on the 16 August 2024. He also scored in the Final against Derry City with a penalty which secured Drogheda's win and his top goalscorer of the tournament award with 7. James-Taylor departed Drogheda at the end of June 2025 after scoring 15 goals in 35 appearances in all competitions during the loan, with the club announcing that he had turned down a substantial contract offer in order to pursue another opportunity.

=== Bohemians ===
On 1 July 2025, James-Taylor signed for League of Ireland Premier Division club Bohemians on a multi-year contract.

== Career statistics ==
As of match played 30 October 2026

Appearances and goals by club, season and competition
Club	Season	League			Domestic Cup (Note: Includes FA Cup & FAI Cup)		League Cup (Note: Includes EFL Cup)		Other		Total	
Club	Season	Division	Apps	Goals	Apps	Goals	Apps	Goals	Apps	Goals	Apps	Goals
Salford City	2018–19	National League	0	0	0	0	—		1 (Note: Appearance in FA Trophy)	0	1	0
Stoke City	2021–22	Championship	0	0	0	0	0	0	—		0	0
Stoke City	2022–23	Championship	0	0	0	0	0	0	—		0	0
Stoke City	Total		0	0	0	0	0	0	—		0	0
Wealdstone (loan)	2021–22	National League	4	0	0	0	—		—		4	0
AFC Fylde (loan)	2021–22	National League North	10	2	0	0	—		—		10	2
Walsall (loan)	2022–23	League Two	22	1	3	1	2	0	3 (Note: Appearance in EFL Trophy)	0	30	2
Walsall	2023–24	League Two	26	2	3	1	1	0	3	0	33	3
Drogheda United (loan)	2024	League of Ireland Premier Division	14	6	5	7	—		1 (Note: Appearance in the 2024 League of Ireland Premier Division Promotion/Relegation Playoff)	0	20	13
Drogheda United (loan)	2025	League of Ireland Premier Division	13	2	—		—		2 (Note: Appearances in the Leinster Senior Cup)	0	15	2
Drogheda United (loan)	Total		27	8	5	7	—		3	0	35	15
Bohemians	2025	League of Ireland Premier Division	10	5	1	0	—		—		11	5
Bohemians	2026	League of Ireland Premier Division	24	6	2	0	—		6 (Note: Appearances in the UEFA Conference League)	3	32	9
Bohemians	Total		34	11	3	0	—		6	3	43	14
Career total			123	24	14	9	3	0	16	3	156	36

== Honours ==
=== Club ===
Drogheda United

- FAI Cup: 2024

=== Individual ===
- Drogheda United Supporters Player of the Year: 2024
