= Oisin McEntee =

Irish footballer (born 2001)

- McEntee in 2026

Personal information
- Full name: Oisin Michael McEntee
- Date of birth: 5 January 2001 (age 25)
- Place of birth: New York City, New York, U.S.
- Height: 1.90 m (6 ft 3 in)
- Position: Defender

Team information
- Current team: Heart of Midlothian
- Number: 6

Youth career
- Cootehill
- Carrick Rovers
- 2014–2015: Belvedere
- 2015–2017: Malahide United
- 2017–2021: Newcastle United

Senior career*
Years	Team	Apps	(Gls)
2021–2022	Newcastle United	0	(0)
2021–2022	→ Greenock Morton (loan)	25	(1)
2022–2025	Walsall	64	(4)
2025–	Heart of Midlothian	35	(3)

International career
- Republic of Ireland U17
- Republic of Ireland U18
- Republic of Ireland U19
2021–2022	Republic of Ireland U21	7	(0)
- * Club domestic league appearances and goals as of 15:52, 18 October 2026 (UTC)

Oisin Michael McEntee (born 5 January 2001) is a professional footballer who plays as a defender for Scottish Premiership club Heart of Midlothian. Born in the United States, he has represented Republic of Ireland at youth level.

== Early and personal life ==
Born in New York City, McEntee grew up in County Cavan, and attended Patrician High School in Carrickmacross in neighbouring County Monaghan. His father Mickey was a Gaelic footballer who played for Cavan GAA, and McEntee played at youth level for Shercock GAA before concentrating on association football.

== Club career ==
McEntee spent his early career with Cootehill, Carrick Rovers, Belvedere and Malahide United. McEntee joined Newcastle United at the age of 16, captaining their under-18 team. He spent time on loan at Greenock Morton before signing for Walsall in May 2022. He underwent shoulder surgery in June 2022.

On 21 November 2023, Walsall announced McEntee had extended his contract to 2025.

McEntee left Walsall at the end of his contract on 30 June 2025, and signed for Scottish club Heart of Midlothian on 1 July 2025.

== International career ==
McEntee was an Irish youth international. He appeared at the 2018 UEFA European Under-17 Championship.

He made various appearances at underage level, including seven appearances for the Republic of Ireland under-21s.

== Career statistics ==
As of 18 October 2026

Appearances and goals by club, season and competition
Club	Season	League			National cup		League cup		Other		Total	
Club	Season	Division	Apps	Goals	Apps	Goals	Apps	Goals	Apps	Goals	Apps	Goals
Newcastle United	2021–22	Premier League	0	0	0	0	0	0	0	0	0	0
Greenock Morton (loan)	2021–22	Scottish Championship	25	1	2	0	0	0	1 (Note: Appearance in the Scottish League Challenge Cup)	0	28	1
Walsall	2022–23	EFL League Two	13	0	2	0	0	0	0	0	15	0
Walsall	2023–24	EFL League Two	20	4	3	0	1	1	3 (Note: Appearance(s) in the EFL Trophy)	1	27	6
Walsall	2024–25	EFL League Two	31	0	1	0	1	0	4 (Note: Three appearances in the EFL Trophy, one appearance in the play-offs)	0	37	0
Walsall	Total		64	4	6	0	2	1	7	1	79	6
Heart of Midlothian	2025–26	Scottish Premiership	28	2	0	0	4	1	0	0	32	3
Heart of Midlothian	2026–27	Scottish Premiership	7	1	0	0	0	0	7 (Note: Two appearances in UEFA Champions League qualifying, five appearances and one goal in UEFA Europa League)	1	14	2
Heart of Midlothian	Total		35	3	0	0	4	1	7	1	46	5
Career total			124	8	8	0	6	2	15	2	153	12
