= Brandon Comley =

Montserrat international footballer

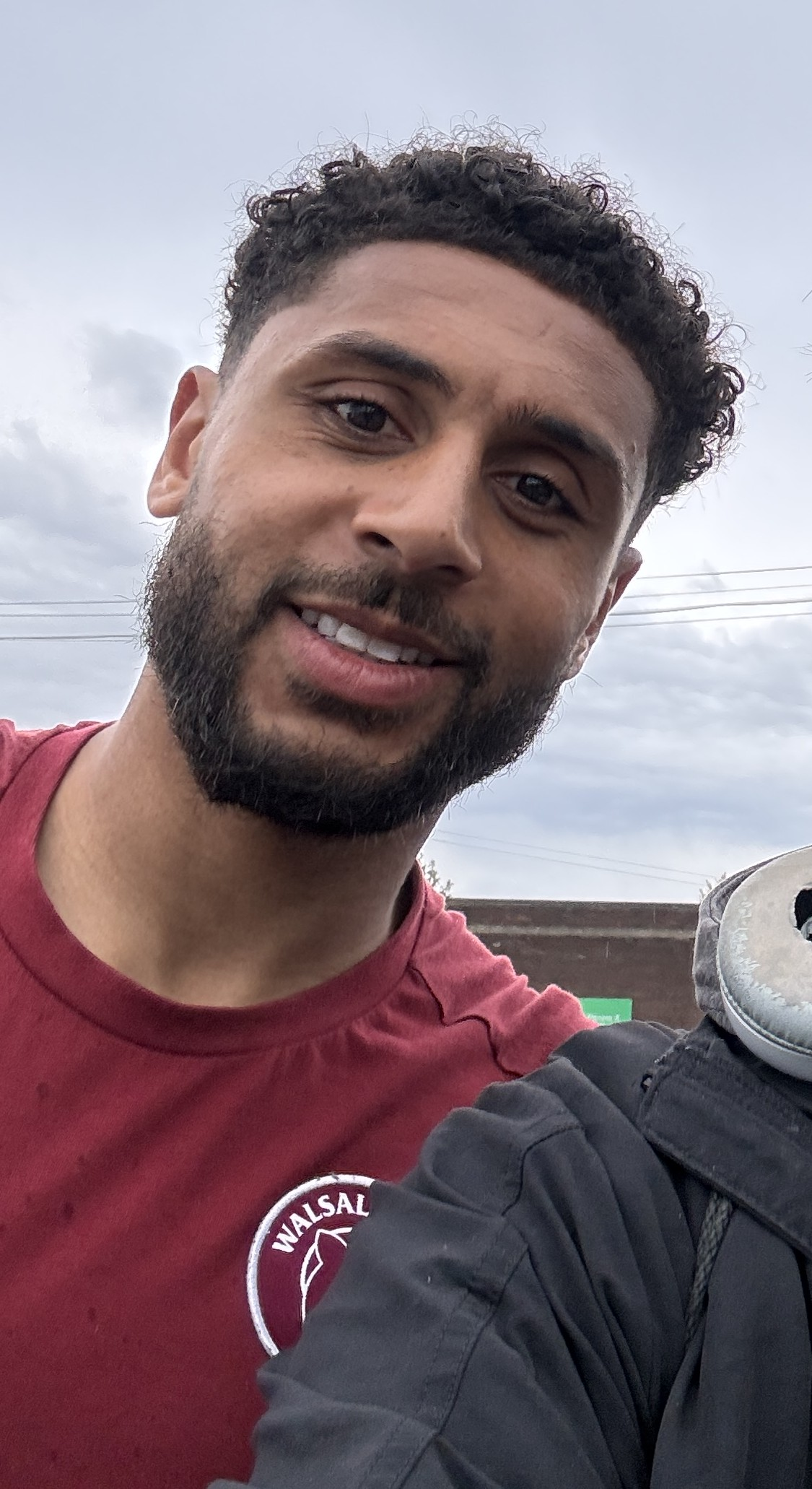
- Comley in 2026

Personal information
- Full name: Brandon Comley
- Date of birth: 18 November 1995 (age 31)
- Place of birth: Islington, England
- Height: 5 ft 11 in (1.80 m)
- Position: Midfielder

Team information
- Current team: Barnet
- Number: 14

Youth career
- 2005–2015: Queens Park Rangers

Senior career*
Years	Team	Apps	(Gls)
2014–2018	Queens Park Rangers	2	(0)
2016	→ Carlisle United (loan)	12	(0)
2016–2017	→ Grimsby Town (loan)	20	(0)
2017	→ Grimsby Town (loan)	13	(0)
2017–2018	→ Colchester United (loan)	21	(0)
2018–2020	Colchester United	54	(2)
2020–2021	Bolton Wanderers	10	(0)
2022	Dagenham & Redbridge	17	(0)
2022–2026	Walsall	129	(2)
2026–	Barnet	8	(0)

International career^{‡}
2018–	Montserrat	29	(0)
- * Club domestic league appearances and goals as of 07:45, 11 October 2026 (UTC) ‡ National team caps and goals as of 14:26, 21 November 2026 (UTC)

Brandon Comley (born 18 November 1995) is a professional footballer who plays for EFL League Two side Barnet. Born in England, he plays for the Montserrat national team.

Comley came through the Queens Park Rangers Academy, joining at the age of nine and made his first-team debut in 2015 in the Premier League. He had loan spells in League Two with Carlisle United, Grimsby Town, and Colchester United. He joined the latter on a permanent basis in January 2018.

== Club career ==
=== Queens Park Rangers ===
Born in Islington, London, Comley joined Queens Park Rangers Academy at the age of nine, where he progressed through the age groups to eventually make his first-team debut in 2015. He made his club and Premier League debut on 24 May 2015 as an 80th-minute substitute for Karl Henry during QPR's 5–1 defeat at Leicester City on the final day of the season.

After facing Carlisle United in the League Cup first round on 25 August 2015, Comley made a loan move to the League Two club on 21 January 2016 in an initial month-long deal. He made his United debut ten days later, starting in their 3–0 home defeat by Everton in the fourth round of the FA Cup. In just his third appearance for the club, Comley was sent off for a second bookable offence during Carlisle's 1–0 league defeat to Newport County on 13 February. His loan was extended until the end of the season in March 2016. He went on to make 13 appearances for the Cumbrians.

On 31 August 2016, Comley signed for League Two side Grimsby Town on loan until January 2017. He made his debut on 3 September during Grimsby's 2–2 draw at Notts County. He made 22 appearances for Grimsby in all competitions before he returned to QPR in January. He made one appearance for his parent club, before rejoining Grimsby on loan until the end of the season. He made a further 13 league appearances for the club.

On 31 August 2017, Comley joined League Two club Colchester United on loan until January 2018. He made his Colchester debut on 9 September in their 3–1 win against Crawley Town. At the completion of his loan, he had made 23 first-team appearances for the U's.

=== Colchester United ===
Colchester United signed their former loanee Comley on a permanent basis on 17 January 2018 for an undisclosed fee. He joined on a 2 1/2-year contract. He made his second debut for the club on 27 January 2018 as a substitute for Courtney Senior in Colchester's 2–2 draw at Port Vale. He scored his first professional goal on 10 March in a 1–1 draw at Mansfield Town. On 28 April 2020 Colchester confirmed that Comley would be released at the end his contract in June 2020.

=== Bolton Wanderers ===
On 21 July 2020, Comley joined Bolton Wanderers on a two-year deal. His debut came on 5 September in Bolton's first match of the season, a 1–2 home defeat against Bradford in the first round of the EFL Cup. He wasn't included in Bolton's squad list for the 21/22 season, meaning he would be unable to play in any league matches. On 3 November 2021 the club confirmed that Comley had had his contract terminated by mutual consent.

=== Dagenham & Redbridge ===
On 5 February 2022, he dropped into non-league when he signed for National League side Dagenham & Redbridge on a deal until the end of the season.

=== Walsall ===
On 20 June 2022, Comley agreed to join League Two club Walsall on a two-year deal from 1 July 2022. He scored his first goal on his debut, scoring Walsall's first goal of the season in a 4–0 win over Hartlepool United.

In February 2024, he signed a new contract, keeping him with the Saddlers until June 2026.

On 6 May 2026, the club announced the player would be leaving in the summer when his contract expired.

=== Barnet ===
On 12 June 2026, Comley agreed to join fellow League Two side Barnet.

== International career ==
Born in England, Comley was also eligible to represent both Saint Lucia and Montserrat internationally, with his grandfather having been born in Montserrat. In March 2015, Comley was called up by the Montserrat national team to represent them in two 2018 FIFA World Cup qualifying first round fixtures against Curaçao. He did not appear in either fixture.

In August 2018, Comley was again called up by Montserrat ahead of their CONCACAF Nations League qualifier against El Salvador on 8 September. He played the full 90 minutes as Montserrat fell to a 2–1 defeat to the Central American nation.

In June 2025, Comley was appointed as captain of Montserrat ahead of a 2026 World Cup qualifier against Belize.

== Personal life ==
Brandon has an older brother James who is also a footballer. He played alongside James on his international debut against El Salvador in September 2018.

== Career statistics ==
=== Club ===
As of match played 10 October 2026

Appearances and goals by club, season and competition
Club	Season	League			FA Cup		League Cup		Other		Total	
Club	Season	Division	Apps	Goals	Apps	Goals	Apps	Goals	Apps	Goals	Apps	Goals
Queens Park Rangers	2014–15	Premier League	1	0	0	0	0	0	—		1	0
Queens Park Rangers	2015–16	Championship	0	0	—		1	0	—		1	0
Queens Park Rangers	2016–17	Championship	1	0	—		0	0	—		1	0
Queens Park Rangers	2017–18	Championship	0	0	—		0	0	—		0	0
Queens Park Rangers	Total		2	0	0	0	1	0	0	0	3	0
Carlisle United (loan)	2015–16	League Two	12	0	1	0	—		—		13	0
Grimsby Town (loan)	2016–17	League Two	33	0	1	0	—		1 (Note: Appearance(s) in the EFL Trophy)	0	35	0
Colchester United	2017–18	League Two	38	1	1	0	—		1	0	40	1
Colchester United	2018–19	League Two	13	0	0	0	1	0	1	0	15	0
Colchester United	2019–20	League Two	24	1	1	0	5	1	3	0	33	2
Colchester United	Total		75	2	2	0	6	1	5	0	88	3
Bolton Wanderers	2020–21	League Two	10	0	0	0	1	0	3	0	14	0
Bolton Wanderers	2021–22	League One	0	0	0	0	0	0	1	0	1	0
Bolton Wanderers	Total		10	0	0	0	1	0	4	0	15	0
Dagenham & Redbridge	2021–22	National League	17	0	—		—		2 (Note: Appearance(s) in the FA Trophy)	0	19	0
Walsall	2022–23	League Two	40	1	4	0	1	0	1	0	46	1
Walsall	2023–24	League Two	33	1	3	0	1	0	1	0	38	1
Walsall	2024–25	League Two	18	0	1	0	0	0	3 (Note: One appearance in EFL Trophy, two appearances in League Two play-offs)	0	22	0
Walsall	2025–26	League Two	38	0	3	0	1	0	3	0	45	0
Walsall	Total		129	2	11	0	3	0	8	0	151	2
Barnet	2026–27	League Two	8	0	0	0	0	0	1	0	9	0
Career total			286	4	15	0	11	1	21	0	333	5

=== International ===
As of match played 6 October 2026

Appearances and goals by national team and year
National team	Year	Apps	Goals
Montserrat	2018	3	0
Montserrat	2019	6	0
Montserrat	2021	4	0
Montserrat	2022	3	0
Montserrat	2023	1	0
Montserrat	2024	5	0
Montserrat	2025	2	0
Montserrat	2026	3	0
Total		27	0

== Honours ==
Bolton Wanderers

- EFL League Two third-place promotion: 2020–21

Individual

- Walsall Players' Player of the Season: 2023–24
