= Jacob Maddox =

English footballer (born 1998)

Personal information
- Full name: Jacob Christian Maddox
- Date of birth: 3 November 1998 (age 28)
- Place of birth: Bristol, England
- Height: 5 ft 10 in (1.78 m)
- Position: Midfielder

Team information
- Current team: Merthyr Town

Youth career
- –2013: Bristol City
- 2013–2018: Chelsea

Senior career*
Years	Team	Apps	(Gls)
2018–2020	Chelsea	0	(0)
2018–2019	→ Cheltenham Town (loan)	38	(1)
2019	→ Tranmere Rovers (loan)	0	(0)
2020	→ Southampton (loan)	0	(0)
2020–2022	Vitória de Guimarães	3	(0)
2021–2022	→ Burton Albion (loan)	16	(0)
2022–2023	Walsall	28	(1)
2023–2025	Forest Green Rovers	18	(0)
2025–2026	Yeovil Town	5	(0)
2026	→ Merthyr Town (loan)	16	(2)
2026–	Merthyr Town	10	(2)

International career
2013	England U16	2	(0)
2014	England U17	4	(0)
2016–2017	England U19	3	(0)
2017	England U20	2	(0)
Medal record
Men's football
Representing England
UEFA European Under-19 Championship
Winner	2017
- * Club domestic league appearances and goals as of 05:47, 3 October 2026 (UTC)

Jacob Christian Maddox (born 3 November 1998) is an English professional footballer who plays as a midfielder for National League North club Merthyr Town.

== Club career ==
Maddox was born in Bristol and began his career with Bristol City, moving to Chelsea at the end of his under-14 year. He moved on loan to Cheltenham Town in July 2018. He made his professional debut on the first day of the 2018–19 season, starting the game against Crawley Town.

On 8 August 2019, Maddox joined Tranmere Rovers on a season loan deal. After two EFL Trophy appearances the loan was ended on 12 December 2019.

Maddox joined fellow Premier League side Southampton on loan on 2 February 2020. The contact included an option to buy at the end of the season. Maddox joined Southampton's Under-23 squad.

On 12 August 2020, Maddox signed a four-year deal at Portuguese club Vitória de Guimarães, ending his seven year stay at Chelsea. He returned to England in July 2021, signing on loan for Burton Albion.

In September 2022 he signed for Walsall. He was released by Walsall at the end of the 2022–23 season.

On 7 August 2023, Maddox signed for Forest Green Rovers on a free transfer.

On 7 January 2025, Maddox had his contract with Forest Green Rovers terminated by mutual consent, allowing him to join fellow National League side Yeovil Town on an eighteen-month contract. On 2 February 2026, Maddox joined National League North club Merthyr Town on loan until the end of the 2025–26 season. He was released by Yeovil Town at the end of the 2025–26 season.

On 2 June 2026, Maddox joined Merthyr Town permanently on a free transfer.

== International career ==
He has been a youth international for England, up to under-20 level. In June 2017, he was selected to represent England at the 2017 UEFA European Under-19 Championship.

== Career statistics ==
As of 26 September 2026

Appearances and goals by club, season and competition
Club	Season	League			National cup (Note: Includes FA Cup and Taça de Portugal)		League cup (Note: Includes EFL Cup and Taça da Liga)		Other		Total	
Club	Season	Division	Apps	Goals	Apps	Goals	Apps	Goals	Apps	Goals	Apps	Goals
Chelsea U21	2016–17	—			—		—		2 (Note: Appearance(s) in EFL Trophy)	0	2	0
Chelsea U21	2017–18	—			—		—		6	0	6	0
Chelsea U21	Total	—			—		—		6	0	6	0
Chelsea	2018–19	Premier League	0	0	0	0	0	0	0	0	0	0
Chelsea	2019–20	Premier League	0	0	0	0	0	0	0	0	0	0
Chelsea	Total		0	0	0	0	0	0	0	0	0	0
Cheltenham Town (loan)	2018–19	League Two	38	1	2	0	1	0	3	3	44	4
Tranmere Rovers (loan)	2019–20	League One	0	0	0	0	0	0	2	0	2	0
Southampton (loan)	2019–20	Premier League	0	0	—		—		—		0	0
Vitória de Guimarães	2020–21	Primeira Liga	3	0	2	0	1	0	—		6	0
Burton Albion (loan)	2021–22	League One	16	0	0	0	0	0	2	0	18	0
Walsall	2022–23	League Two	28	1	3	1	0	0	1	0	32	2
Forest Green Rovers	2023–24	League Two	18	0	0	0	1	0	2	0	21	0
Forest Green Rovers	2024–25	National League	0	0	0	0	—		1 (Note: Appearance(s) in National League Cup)	0	1	0
Forest Green Rovers	Total		18	0	0	0	1	0	3	0	22	0
Yeovil Town	2024–25	National League	5	0	—		—		—		5	0
Yeovil Town	2025–26	National League	0	0	0	0	—		2 (Note: Appearances in FA Trophy)	0	2	0
Yeovil Town	Total		5	0	0	0	—		2	0	7	0
Merthyr Town (loan)	2025–26	National League North	16	2	—		—		—		16	2
Merthyr Town	2026–27	National League North	10	2	0	0	—		0	0	10	2
Career total			134	6	7	1	3	0	21	3	165	10

== Honours ==
Chelsea Youth

- U18 Premier League: 2016–17
- FA Youth Cup: 2015–16, 2016–17
- UEFA Youth League: 2015–16

England U19

- UEFA European Under-19 Championship: 2017
