= Shay Willock =

English footballer (born 2003)

Personal information
- Full name: Shay Carter Willock
- Date of birth: 15 September 2003 (age 23)
- Place of birth: Birmingham
- Height: 6 ft 3 in (1.91 m)
- Position: Striker

Team information
- Current team: Barwell

Youth career
- 2020–2021: Solihull Moors
- 2021: Walsall

Senior career*
Years	Team	Apps	(Gls)
2021–2023	Walsall	2	(0)
2022–2023	→ Worcester Raiders (loan)		
2023–2025	Alvechurch	19	(3)
2023	→ Worcester Raiders (loan)	11	(7)
2024	→ Walsall Wood (loan)		
2024	→ Coventry Sphinx (loan)	10	(4)
2025	→ Rugby Town (loan)	1	(0)
2025–2026	Stourbridge	13	(1)
2026	→ Stafford Rangers (loan)		
2026	Bromsgrove Sporting	8	(2)
2026–	Barwell	0	(0)
- * Club domestic league appearances and goals as of 20:00, 26 June 2026 (UTC)

Shay Carter Willock (born 15 September 2003) is an English footballer who plays as a striker for Northern Premier League Division One Midlands club Barwell.

== Career ==
=== Walsall ===
Willock made his debut for Walsall on 30 November 2021, coming on as a 73rd-minute substitute for Jack Earing against Cambridge United in the EFL Trophy, a match Walsall lost 2–0. He made his league debut as a late substitute for George Miller in a 3–0 win over Colchester United on 11 December 2021. Shay was loaned out to Hellenic League Premier Division side Worcester Raiders on an initial one-month work experience loan, however after impressing, the loan was extended for the season.

=== Alvechurch ===
On 21 July 2023, Southern League Premier Division Central side Alvechurch announced the signing of Willock. Shay was promptly loaned out to former club Worcester Raiders on 21 August 2023, on a three-month loan deal. On 10 February 2024, Shay signed for Walsall Wood on a 28-day loan from Alvechurch. Willock re-signed with Alvechurch for the 2024–25 season. Shay moved on loan to Northern Premier League Division One Midlands side Coventry Sphinx on 10 August 2024, making his debut the same day in a home fixture against Shepshed Dynamo. Alvechurch confirmed on 12 March 2025, that Willock has signed for Rugby Town on a one-month loan. Willock made his debut for Rugby Town on 15 March 2025 in a home fixture against Grantham Town. although it wasn't one to remember as Willock was sent off on the 74th minute for two yellow card offences, and subsequently didn't play for the club again as his suspension lasted the duration of the loan. Alvechurch announced that Willock, along with 7 of his teammates had been retained for the 2025–26 season. However, on 10 September 2025, Alvechurch confirmed that Willock had departed the club, after both parties agreed to a mutual termination of the players contract.

=== Stourbridge ===
Shay signed for fellow Southern League Premier Division Central side Stourbridge on 16 September 2025. Shay signed for Northern Premier League Division One West side Stafford Rangers on a 28-day loan on 17 January 2026.

=== Bromsgrove Sporting ===
Willock then moved on to fellow Southern League Premier Division Central side Bromsgrove Sporting on 16 March 2026. Shay made his debut on 21 March 2026, in an away fixture against Royston Town, coming on as a 77th-minute substitute for Theo Robinson. The match finished 1–1. Willock went on to make eight appearances and scored twice as Bromsgrove Sporting narrowly avoided relegation finishing in 18th position, a place above the relegation zone.

=== Barwell ===
On 24 June 2026, Willock signed for Northern Premier League Division One Midlands side Barwell.

== Career statistics ==
As of end of 2022–23 season

Club	Season	Division	League		FA Cup		EFL Cup		Other		Total	
Club	Season	Division	Apps	Goals	Apps	Goals	Apps	Goals	Apps	Goals	Apps	Goals
Walsall	2021–22	League Two	2	0	0	0	0	0	1 (Note: Appearance(s) in Football League Trophy)	0	2	0
Walsall	2022–23	League Two	0	0	0	0	0	0	0	0	0	0
Walsall	Total		2	0	0	0	0	0	1	0	2	0
Career total			2	0	0	0	0	0	1	0	2	0
