= 2022–23 Walsall F.C. season =

Walsall FC
2022–23 season
- Chairman: Leigh Pomlett and Benjamin Boycott
- Head coach: Michael Flynn (until 19 April)
- Stadium: Bescot Stadium
- League Two: 16th
- FA Cup: Fourth round
- EFL Cup: Second round
- EFL Trophy: Group stage
- Top goalscorer: League: Johnson (12); All: Johnson (15)
- Biggest win: 4–0 (30 July 2022 vs Hartlepool)
- Biggest defeat: 2–0 (18 October 2022 vs MK Dons) (29 December 2022 vs Stockport County)
Home colours	Away colours

The 2022–23 season was the 135th season in the existence of Walsall Football Club and the club's fourth consecutive season in League Two. In addition to the league, they will also compete in the 2022–23 FA Cup, the 2022–23 EFL Cup and the 2022–23 EFL Trophy.

== Transfers ==
=== In ===
Date	Pos	Player	Transferred from	Fee	Ref
21 June 2022	GK	(Wales) Owen Evans	(England) Cheltenham Town	Undisclosed	
1 July 2022 (Note: The transfer was announced on 20 June, and would become official on July 1, once his Forest Green Rovers contract expired)	CM	(England) Taylor Allen	(England) Forest Green Rovers	Free Transfer	
1 July 2022 (Note: The transfer was announced on 1 June, and would become official on July 1, once his Tranmere Rovers contract expired)	CB	(England) Peter Clarke	(England) Tranmere Rovers	Free Transfer	
1 July 2022 (Note: The transfer was announced on 20 June, and would become official on July 1, once his Dagenham & Redbridge contract expired)	DM	(Montserrat) Brandon Comley	(England) Dagenham & Redbridge	Free Transfer	
1 July 2022 (Note: The transfer was announced on 25 May, and would become official on July 1, once his Bolton Wanderers contract expired)	LB	(Guyana) Liam Gordon	(England) Bolton Wanderers	Free Transfer	
1 July 2022 (Note: The transfer was announced on 22 June, and would become official on July 1, once his Derby County contract expired)	CM	(England) Isaac Hutchinson	(England) Derby County	Free Transfer	
1 July 2022 (Note: The transfer was announced on 27 May, and would become official on July 1, once his Newcastle United contract expired)	CB	(Republic of Ireland) Oisin McEntee	(England) Newcastle United	Free Transfer	
1 July 2022 (Note: The transfer was announced on 21 June, and would become official on July 1, once his Wycombe Wanderers contract expired)	GK	(Wales) Adam Przybek	(England) Wycombe Wanderers	Free Transfer	
1 July 2022 (Note: The transfer was announced on 13 June, and would become official on July 1, once his Carlisle United contract expired)	DM	(England) Joe Riley	(England) Carlisle United	Free Transfer	
1 July 2022 (Note: The transfer was announced on 15 June, and would become official on July 1, once his Cheltenham Town contract expired)	CF	(England) Andy Williams	(England) Cheltenham Town	Free Transfer	
26 July 2022	CF	(England) Timmy Abraham	(England) Fulham	Free Transfer	
4 August 2022	RW	(England) Tom Knowles	(England) Yeovil Town	Undisclosed	
5 September 2022	FW	(England) Jonas Mukuna	(England) Sutton United	Free Transfer	
5 September 2022	AM	(England) Jacob Maddox	(Portugal) Vitória de Guimarães	Free Transfer	
13 January 2023	CF	(Jamaica) Jamille Matt	(England) Forest Green Rovers	Undisclosed	

=== Out ===
Date	Pos	Player	Transferred to	Fee	Ref
10 June 2022	RM	(Republic of Ireland) Emmanuel Osadebe	(England) Bradford City	Undisclosed	
15 June 2022	RW	(England) Devante Rodney	(England) Rochdale	Undisclosed	
30 June 2022	CB	(England) Tom Leak	(England) Kidderminster Harriers	Released	
30 June 2022	RB	(England) Zak Mills	(England) Boston United	Released	
30 June 2022	GK	(England) Jack Rose	(England) Sutton United	Released	
30 June 2022	SS	(England) Lee Tomlin	(England) Doncaster Rovers	Released	
30 June 2022	LB	(Republic of Ireland) Stephen Ward	Retired		
30 June 2022	CM	(England) Joe Willis	(England) Stafford Rangers	Released	
1 August 2022	GK	(England) Tommy Jackson	(England) Stoke City	Free Transfer	
2 November 2022	GK	(Wales) Adam Przybek	(England) Stevenage	Mutual Consent	
31 January 2023	RW	(England) Brendan Kiernan	(England) Hartlepool United	Free Transfer	

=== Loans in ===
Date	Pos	Player	Loaned from	On loan until	Ref
15 June 2022	RB	(England) Liam Bennett	(England) Cambridge United	30 December 2022 (Note: On 30 December, Bennett was recalled to Cambridge United)	
1 July 2022	CF	(England) Douglas James-Taylor	(England) Stoke City	End of Season	
11 July 2022	AM	(Scotland) Flynn Clarke	(England) Norwich City	1 September 2022 (Note: On 1 September, Clarke returned to Norwich City)	
23 July 2022	CF	(England) Danny Johnson	(England) Mansfield Town	15 January 2023	
1 September 2022	CF	(England) Danny Cashman	(England) Coventry City	16 January 2023 (Note: On 16 January, Cashman was recalled to Coventry)	
4 January 2023	CB	(Wales) Joe Low	(England) Bristol City	End of Season	
5 January 2023	RM	(England) Robbie Willmott	(Wales) Newport County	End of Season	
26 January 2023	DM	(Cameroon) Yann Songo'o	(England) Bradford City	End of Season	
27 January 2023	GK	(England) Jackson Smith	(England) Wolverhampton Wanderers	End of Season	
31 January 2023	CF	(England) Matty Stevens	(England) Forest Green Rovers	End of Season	

=== Loans out ===
Date	Pos	Player	Loaned to	On loan until	Ref
6 July 2022	RB	(England) Joe Foulkes	(England) Kidderminster Harriers	End of Season	
12 July 2022	CM	(England) Sam Perry	(England) Yeovil Town	3 January 2023 (Note: On 3 January, Perry's loan at Yeovil was cut short)	
18 July 2022	CB	(Wales) Rollin Menayese	(England) Hartlepool United	End of Season	
21 September 2022	MF	(England) Shay Willock	(England) Worcester Raiders	21 October 2022	
28 October 2022	CF	(England) Timmy Abraham	(England) Oldham Athletic	End of Season (Note: On 28 December, Abraham's loan at Oldham was extended until the end of the season.)	
3 November 2022	DF	(England) Dan Baldwin	(England) Worcester City	3 December 2022	
3 November 2022	FW	(England) Marvellous Onabirekhanlen	(England) Worcester City	3 December 2022	
11 November 2022	CB	(England) Peter Clarke	(England) Oldham Athletic	End of Season (Note: On 29 December, Clarke's loan at Oldham was extended until the end of the season.)	
3 February 2023	CM	(England) Sam Perry	(England) Leamington	End of Season	

== Pre-season and friendlies ==
On 24 May, the Saddlers announced their first two pre-season friendlies with Aston Villa and Coventry City to visit the Bescot Stadium. Three days later, two away fixtures were added to the schedule against Leamington and AFC Telford United. A fifth, against Solihull Moors was later added to the calendar.

Win Draw Loss Fixtures

1 July 2022 Friendly	Walsall	0–1	Barnsley	Essington
13:00 BST		Report	Cole 45'	Stadium: Walsall Training Ground; Attendance: 0 (behind-closed doors)
Note: Match was played across three thirty-minute stages.

5 July 2022 Friendly	Birmingham City	1–0	Walsall	Kings Norton
14:00 BST	Hogan 43'	Report		Stadium: Wast Hills Training Ground; Attendance: 0 (behind-closed-doors)

9 July 2022 Friendly	Walsall	0–4	Aston Villa	Bescot
13:00 BST		Report	Bailey 7'; Archer 38'; Watkins 54'; Luiz 70'	Stadium: Bescot Stadium; Attendance: 9,409

12 July 2022 Friendly	Leamington	1–1	Walsall	Leamington Spa
19:30 BST	Turner 78'	Report	Williams 6'	Stadium: New Windmill Ground

16 July 2022 Friendly	AFC Telford United	0–2	Walsall	Wellington
15:00 BST		Report	Williams 45'; Hutchinson 49'	Stadium: New Bucks Head

19 July 2022 Friendly	Walsall	0–3	Coventry City	Bescot
19:30 BST		Report	Palmer 51'; Eccles 65'; Tavares 78'	Stadium: Bescot Stadium; Attendance: 2,546

23 July 2022 Friendly	Solihull Moors	0–2	Walsall	Solihull
15:00 BST		Report	Johnson 38'; Williams 74'	Stadium: Damson Park

26 July 2022 Friendly	Rushall Olympic	3–0	Walsall XI	Rushall
19:00 BST	Mitchell 8'; Shorrock 15'; Moore 25'	Report		Stadium: Dales Lane

== Competitions ==
=== Overall record ===
Competition	First match	Last match	Starting round	Record							
Competition	First match	Last match	Starting round	Pld	W	D	L	GF	GA	GD	Win %
League Two	30 July 2022	8 May 2023	Matchday 1	44	11	18	15	44	48	−4	25.00
FA Cup	5 November 2022	28 January 2022	First round	4	3	0	1	6	3	+3	75.00
EFL Cup	9 August 2022	23 August 2022	First round	2	1	0	1	2	1	+1	50.00
EFL Trophy	30 August 2022	18 October 2022	Group stage	3	0	0	3	1	5	−4	0.00
Total				53	15	18	20	53	57	−4	28.30

Last updated: 22 April 2023
Source: [ Soccerway]

=== League Two ===
==== League table ====
Pos	Team	Pld	W	D	L	GF	GA	GD	Pts
13	Crewe Alexandra	46	14	16	16	48	60	−12	58
14	Sutton United	46	15	13	18	46	58	−12	58
15	Newport County	46	14	15	17	53	56	−3	57
16	Walsall	46	12	19	15	46	49	−3	55
17	Gillingham	46	14	13	19	36	49	−13	55
18	Doncaster Rovers	46	16	7	23	46	65	−19	55
19	Harrogate Town	46	12	16	18	59	68	−9	52

Source: EFL Official Website
Rules for classification: 1) Points; 2) Goal difference; 3) Number of goals scored; 4) Head-to-head results; 5) Wins; 6) Away goals; 7) Penalty points (sec 9.5); 8) 12-point sending off offences

==== Results summary ====
Overall								Home						Away					
Pld	W	D	L	GF	GA	GD	Pts	W	D	L	GF	GA	GD	W	D	L	GF	GA	GD
45	11	19	15	44	48	−4	52	8	9	5	26	18	+8	3	10	10	18	30	−12

Last updated: 29 April 2023.
Source: [ Soccerway]

==== Results by round ====
Round	1	2	3	4	5	6	7	8	9	10	11	12	13	14	15	16	17	18	19	20	21	22	23	24	25	26	27	28	29	30	31	32	33	34	35	36	37	38	39	40	41	42	43	44	45	46
Ground	H	A	H	A	A	H	A	H	A	H	A	H	H	A	A	H	H	A	H	A	A	H	H	A	A	A	H	A	H	H	A	H	H	A	H	H	A	A	H	A	H	A	A	H	A	H
Result	W	W	D	L	D	L	L	D	L	L	D	W	W	L	D	W	W	D	W	W	W	L	W	D	L	D	D	D	D	D	D	L	D	L	D	W	D	L	D	L	D	L	L	L	D	W
Position	1	1	2	8	9	9	13	14	15	15	17	15	14	15	15	13	12	13	11	10	8	13	9	11	13	14	15	15	14	13	14	14	14	14	14	13	13	13	13	13	13	15	15	17	17	16

Updated to match(es) played on 29 April 2023. Source: [ Soccerway]
A = Away; H = Home; W = Win; D = Draw; L = Loss; P = Postponed

==== Matches ====
Win Draw Loss Fixtures

On 23 June, the league fixtures were announced. Walsall's away game against Doncaster Rovers was later brought forward to avoid a potential clash with an England world cup game. Walsall's last match of the season was pushed back due to the coronation of King Charles III

30 July 2022 1	Walsall	4–0	Hartlepool United	Bescot
15:00 BST	Comley 21'; Johnson 27', 58', 73'	Report	Lacey (yellow card) 53'; Ferguson (yellow card) 86'	Stadium: Bescot Stadium; Attendance: 5,754; Referee: Lee Swabey

6 August 2022 2	Newport County	0–1	Walsall	Newport
15:00 BST	Bennett (yellow card) 8'	Report	Hutchinson (yellow card) 16'; Demetriou 63' (o.g.); Daniels (yellow card) 65'; Allen (yellow card) 67' (yellow-red card) 84'	Stadium: Rodney Parade; Attendance: 4,988; Referee: Alan Young

13 August 2022 3	Walsall	1–1	Stevenage	Bescot
15:00 BST	Johnson 13'; Knowles (yellow card) 70'; Evans (yellow card) 90+2'	Report	Roberts (yellow card) 90+5'; Rose 90+10' (yellow card) 90+11'	Stadium: Bescot Stadium; Attendance: 5,079; Referee: Charles Breakspear

16 August 2022 4	Barrow	2–1	Walsall	Barrow-in-Furness
19:45 BST	Warren 9'; McClelland 12'; Gordon (yellow card) 90+4'	Report	Johnson 46'; Maher (yellow card) 62'	Stadium: Holker Street; Attendance: 3,435; Referee: Andy Haines

20 August 2022 5	Gillingham	0–0	Walsall	Gillingham
15:00 BST		Report	Maher (yellow card) 46'; Johnson (yellow card) 80'; Daniels (yellow card) 90+1'; White (yellow card) 90+4'	Stadium: Priestfield Stadium; Attendance: 3,917; Referee: Bobby Madley

27 August 2022 6	Walsall	1–2	Grimsby Town	Bescot
15:00 BST	Johnson 5' (yellow card) 22'	Report	Clifton 77', 82'	Stadium: Bescot Stadium; Attendance: 5,644; Referee: Peter Wright

3 September 2022 7	Bradford City	2–1	Walsall	Bradford
15:00 BST	Ridehalgh (yellow card) 26'; Cook 41'; Young 45' (yellow card) 45'	Report	Johnson (penalty missed); Daniels 57'; Monthe (yellow card) 90'	Stadium: Valley Parade; Attendance: 16,433; Referee: Marc Edwards

13 September 2022 8	Walsall	1–1	Colchester United	Bescot
19:45 BST	Comley (yellow card) 16'; Hutchinson (yellow card) 21'; Knowles 61'	Report	Nouble 2'; Appiah (yellow card) 22'; Eastman (yellow card) 30'; Coxe (yellow card) 43'; Lubala (yellow card) 49'	Stadium: Bescot Stadium; Attendance: 4,327; Referee: Carl Boyeson

17 September 2022 9	Leyton Orient	1–0	Walsall	Leyton
15:00 BST	Beckles 58'; James (yellow card) 81'	Report	Comley (yellow card) 26'	Stadium: Brisbane Road; Attendance: 6,736; Referee: Andy Davies

24 September 2022 10	Walsall	0–1	Tranmere Rovers	Bescot
15:00 BST	Maddox (yellow card) 61'	Report	McAlear (yellow card) 29'; Hemmings (yellow card) 38'; Nevitt 90+6'	Stadium: Bescot Stadium; Attendance: 5,845; Referee: Ben Toner

1 October 2022 11	Stockport County	1–1	Walsall	Edgeley
15:00 BST	Madden 27'	Report	Kinsella (yellow card) 30'; Comley (yellow card) 37'; Cashman (yellow card) 87'; Williams 88'	Stadium: Edgeley Park; Attendance: 8,805; Referee: Andrew Kitchen

4 October 2022 12	Walsall	1–0	Northampton Town	Walsall
19:45 BST	Johnson 37'; Hutchinson (yellow card) 44'; White (yellow card) 63'; James-Taylor (yellow card) 65'; Evans (yellow card) 90'	Report	Hylton (yellow card) 21'; Guthrie (yellow card) 45'	Stadium: Bescot Stadium; Attendance: 4,845; Referee: Sam Barrott

8 October 2022 13	Walsall	3–1	AFC Wimbledon	Bescot
15:00 BST	Hutchinson 5'; Allen (yellow card) 25'; Daniels (yellow card) 28'; Johnson 50'; White (yellow card) 90+2'; Knowles 90+3'	Report	Towler 21' (yellow card) 89'; Kalambayi (yellow card) 78'	Stadium: Bescot Stadium; Attendance: 4,905; Referee: Adam Herczeg

15 October 2022 14	Mansfield Town	2–1	Walsall	Mansfield
13:00 BST	Lapslie 15'; Swan 82' (yellow card) 84'	Report	Bennett 35'	Stadium: Field Mill; Attendance: 6,821; Referee: Sam Purkiss

22 October 2022 15	Sutton United	1–1	Walsall	Sutton
15:00 BST	Randall (yellow card) 45+9'; Milsom 72' (pen.)	Report	White (yellow card) 7'; Comley (yellow card) 16' (yellow-red card) 25'; Maddox 86'	Stadium: Gander Green Lane; Attendance: 2,773; Referee: Paul Howard

25 October 2022 16	Walsall	3–1	Harrogate Town	Bescot
19:45 BST	Johnson 14' (pen.); Gordon 18'; Hutchinson 34'	Report	McArdle (yellow card) 30'; Headley (yellow card) 38'; Daly 83'; Richards (yellow card) 88'	Stadium: Bescot Stadium; Attendance: 4,347; Referee: Robert Lewis

29 October 2022 17	Walsall	1–0	Rochdale	Bescot
15:00 BST	Evans (yellow card) 19'; White 35'; Knowles (yellow card) 81'; Bennett (yellow card) 83'	Report	Rodney (yellow card) 19'	Stadium: Bescot Stadium; Attendance: 5,050; Referee: Tom Nield

12 November 2022 18	Carlisle United	0–0	Walsall	Carlisle
15:00 GMT		Report		Stadium: Brunton Park; Attendance: 5,493; Referee: Ollie Yates

19 November 2022 19	Walsall	2–1	Crawley Town	Bescot
15:00 GMT	White 14'; Johnson 90+2'	Report	Telford 11'; Francillette (yellow card) 26' (yellow-red card) 39'; Lynch (yellow card) 90+4'; Nichols (yellow card) 90+5'	Stadium: Bescot Stadium; Attendance: 6,201; Referee: Darren Drysdale

2 December 2022 20	Doncaster Rovers	0–2	Walsall	Doncaster
19:45 GMT		Report	Knowles 52'; Johnson 71'	Stadium: Keepmoat Stadium; Attendance: 6,110; Referee: Simon Mather

26 December 2022 21	Swindon Town	1–2	Walsall	Swindon
15:00 GMT	Iandolo 33'; MacDonald (yellow card) 51'	Report	Hutton 45+1' (o.g.); Johnson (yellow card) 45+1'; Monthe 90+4'	Stadium: County Ground; Attendance: 10,240; Referee: James Oldham

29 December 2022 22	Walsall	0–2	Stockport County	Bescot
19:45 GMT	Gordon (yellow card) 21'; Kinsella (yellow card) 30'; White (yellow card) 89'	Report	Wootton 33', 65'; Brown (yellow card) 80'	Stadium: Bescot Stadium; Attendance: 6,455; Referee: Craig Hicks

1 January 2023 23	Walsall	2–1	Mansfield Town	Bescot
15:00 GMT	James-Taylor 43'; Kinsella 47'; Maddox (yellow card) 65'; Evans (yellow card) 82'	Report	Oates 82'	Stadium: Bescot Stadium; Attendance: 6,199; Referee: Charles Breakspear

14 January 2023 24	Tranmere Rovers	1–1	Walsall	Birkenhead
15:00 GMT	Turnbull (yellow card) 57'; Hawkes 78'; Morris (yellow card) 84'	Report	Monthé (yellow card) 71' (yellow-red card) 76'; Johnson 72'; White (yellow card) 89'	Stadium: Prenton Park; Attendance: 6,027; Referee: Declan Bourne

31 January 2023 25	Salford City	1–0	Walsall	Salford
19:45 GMT	Smith 5'; Leak (yellow card) 46'; Galbraith (yellow card) 71'; Cairns (yellow card) 90+6'	Report	White (yellow card) 51'; Maddox (yellow card) 85'	Stadium: Moor Lane; Attendance: 3,255; Referee: Darren Handley

4 February 2023 26	Northampton Town	0–0	Walsall	Northampton
15:00 GMT	McWilliams (yellow card) 40'; Koiki (yellow card) 72' (yellow-red card) 90+5'	Report	Daniels (yellow card) 45'; Comley (yellow card) 61'; Wilkinson (yellow card) 90+4'	Stadium: Sixfields Stadium; Attendance: 6,500; Referee: Bobby Madden

11 February 2023 27	Walsall	1–1	Leyton Orient	Bescot
15:00 GMT	Low 20'; Willmott (yellow card) 22'; White (yellow card) 67'; Knowles (yellow card) 82'	Report	Sweeney (yellow card) 31'; Turns 83'	Stadium: Bescot Stadium; Attendance: 6,075; Referee: Anthony Backhouse

14 February 2023 28	Colchester United	0–0	Walsall	Colchester
19:45 GMT	Tchamadeu (yellow card) 58'; Tovide (yellow card) 84'	Report	Daniels (yellow card) 62'	Stadium: Colchester Community Stadium; Attendance: 2,577 (161 away); Referee: Sam Allison

18 February 2023 29	Walsall	1–1	Newport County	Bescot
15:00 GMT	Hutchinson 32'; Knowles (yellow card) 34'; White (yellow card) 55'	Report	Charsley (yellow card) 21'; Norman (yellow card) 71', (goal) 78'; Demetriou (yellow card) 90'; Moriah-Welsh (yellow card) 90+2'	Stadium: Bescot Stadium; Attendance: 5,927 (889 away); Referee: Sam Purkiss

21 February 2023 30	Walsall	0–0	Crewe Alexandra	Bescot
19:45 GMT	Knowles (yellow card) 45+4'; Comley (yellow card) 89'	Report	Offord (yellow card) 34'; Robertson (yellow card) 68'; Finnigan (yellow card) 90+4'	Stadium: Bescot Stadium; Attendance: 5,071 (350 away); Referee: David Rock

25 February 2023 31	Hartlepool United	3–3	Walsall	Hartlepool
15:00 GMT	Kemp 56' (pen.), (yellow card) 83', (goal) 90+1' (pen.); Jennings 90+2'	Report	Knowles 33', (yellow card) 89'; Hutchinson 49'; Monthé (yellow card) 61'; Stevens 72'	Stadium: Victoria Park; Attendance: 4,418; Referee: Darren Drysdale

5 March 2023 32	Walsall	0–1	Barrow	Bescot
15:00 GMT	Daniels (yellow card) 72'; Maddox (yellow card) 90+2'	Report	Waters 22'; Young (yellow card) 39'; Foley (yellow card) 56'	Stadium: Bescot Stadium; Attendance: 5,018 (198 away); Referee: Lee Swabey

7 March 2023 33	Walsall	0–0	Bradford City	Walsall
19:45 GMT	Daniels (yellow card) 90'	Report	Stubbs (yellow card) 61'; Halliday (yellow card) 69'; Smallwood (yellow card) 87'	Stadium: Bescot Stadium; Attendance: 4,951 (740 away); Referee: Lewis Smith

11 March 2023 34	Stevenage	3–1	Walsall	Stevenage
15:00 GMT	March 7', 36'; Norris 14'; Piergianni (yellow card) 62'; Reeves (yellow card) 66'; Gilbey (yellow card) 69'	Report	Monthé 29'; White (yellow card) 35'	Stadium: Broadhall Way; Attendance: 3,441 (364 away); Referee: Carl Brook

14 March 2023 35	Walsall	0–0	Swindon Town	Bescot
19:45 GMT	Maddox (yellow card) 53'; Comley (yellow card) 55'	Report		Stadium: Bescot Stadium; Attendance: 5,703; Referee: Martin Woods

18 March 2023 36	Walsall	2–0	Gillingham	Bescot
15:00 GMT	Hutchinson 50', (yellow card) 90+2'; Comley (yellow card) 90+5'; Wilkinson 90+5'	Report	O'Brien (yellow card) 30'	Stadium: Bescot Stadium; Attendance: 6,709 (439 away); Referee: Sunny Singh Gill

25 March 2023 37	Grimsby Town	1–1	Walsall	Cleethorpes
15:00 GMT	Morris 18', (yellow card) 81'; Maher (yellow card) 49'; Smith (yellow card) 73'; Green (yellow card) 85'; Amos (yellow card) 88'	Report	McEntee (yellow card) 38'; Daniels 50', (yellow card) 90+4'; Evans (yellow card) 60'; White (yellow card) 60'	Stadium: Blundell Park; Attendance: 6,176 (417 away); Referee: Robert Lewis

28 March 2023 38	AFC Wimbledon	2–0	Walsall	Wimbledon
19:45 GMT	Nightingale 59'; Al-Hamadi 74', (yellow card) 75'	Report	White (yellow card) 36'; Wilkinson (yellow card) 39'; Hutchinson (yellow card) 43'; Williams (yellow card) 57'	Stadium: Plough Lane; Attendance: 6,809; Referee: Ben Speedie

1 April 2023 39	Walsall	1–1	Sutton United	Bescot
15:00 BST	Labadie (yellow card) 78'; Matt (yellow card) 90'; Hutchinson 90+5'	Report	Bugiel (yellow card) 27'; Smith 31'; Kizzi (yellow card) 90+4'	Stadium: Bescot Stadium; Attendance: 4,809; Referee: Thomas Parsons

7 April 2023 40	Rochdale	4–2	Walsall	Rochdale
15:00 BST	Henderson 42'; Lloyd 44'; Taylor 56'; Brierley 65'	Report	Matt 23'; Knowles 51'; Evans (yellow card) 65'; Maddox (yellow card) 69'	Stadium: Spotland Stadium; Attendance: 3,090; Referee: Andy Haines

10 April 2023 41	Walsall	0–0	Carlisle United	Bescot
15:00 BST	Wilkinson (yellow card) 39'; White (red card) 61'	Report	Armer (yellow card) 38'; Patrick (yellow card) 43'	Stadium: Bescot Stadium; Attendance: 6,117; Referee: Declan Bourne

15 April 2023 42	Crewe Alexandra	2–0	Walsall	Crewe
15:00 BST	McDonald 2', (yellow card) 79'; Long 25'; Mellor (yellow card) 67'	Report	Labadie (yellow card) 49' (yellow-red card) 61'; Knowles (yellow card) 82'; McEntee (yellow card) 90'	Stadium: Gresty Road; Attendance: 4,857 (1,010 away); Referee: Carl Boyeson

18 April 2023 43	Harrogate Town	3–0	Walsall	Harrogate
19:45 BST	Folarin 10'; Olaigbe 66'; Pattison 76'	Report		Stadium: Wetherby Road; Attendance: 1,867; Referee: Rebecca Welch

22 April 2023 44	Walsall	2–3	Salford City	Bescot
15:00 BST	McEntee (yellow card) 40'; Low (yellow card) 54'; Monthé (yellow card) 54'; Matt 62'; Wilkinson 90+5'	Report	Hendry 6'; Barry (red card) 53'; Mallan (yellow card) 82'; McAleny 88'; Lund 90+7'	Stadium: Bescot Stadium; Attendance: 5,208; Referee: Andrew Kitchen

29 April 2023 45	Crawley Town	0–0	Walsall	Crawley
15:00 BST	Gladwin (yellow card) 87'	Report	Hutchinson (yellow card) 90+2'	Stadium: Broadfield Stadium; Attendance: 4,189; Referee: Andrew Kitchen

8 May 2023 46	Walsall	2–1	Doncaster Rovers	Bescot
12:30 BST	Wilkinson 57'; Hutchinson 74'	Report	Faulkner 84'	Stadium: Bescot Stadium; Attendance: 7,176; Referee: Farai Hallam

=== FA Cup ===
Walsall were drawn away to Wycombe Wanderers in the first round, at home to Carlisle United in the second round and away to Stockport County in the third round. Walsall hosted Leicester City in round 4 after a 95th-minute winner in the third round.

Win Draw Loss Fixtures

5 November 2022 First round	Wycombe Wanderers	0–2	Walsall	High Wycombe
15:00 BST		Report	Maddox 41'; Hutchinson 62'	Stadium: Adams Park; Attendance: 2,319; Referee: Martin Woods

26 November 2022 Second round	Walsall	2–1	Carlisle United	Bescot
15:00 GMT	Williams 88'; James-Taylor 90+3'	Report	Edmondson 28'; Mellish (yellow card) 40'; Armer (yellow card) 90'	Stadium: Bescot Stadium; Attendance: 3,499; Referee: Scott Oldham

8 January 2023 Third round	Stockport County	1–2	Walsall	Edgeley
14:00 GMT	Madden 88' (yellow card) 90+4'	Report	Johnson 63'; Williams 90+5' (pen.)	Stadium: Edgeley Park; Attendance: 9,178; Referee: Andrew Kitchen

28 January 2023 Fourth round	Walsall	0-1	Leicester City	Bescot
12:30 GMT	White (yellow card) 27'	Report	Maddison (yellow card) 17'; Iheanacho 68'	Stadium: Bescot Stadium; Attendance: 10,297; Referee: Gavin Ward

=== EFL Cup ===
Win Draw Loss Fixtures

The Saddlers were drawn at home to Swindon Town in the first round. Walsall were then drawn at home to League One side Charlton Athletic in the second round after winning 2–0 in the first round. Walsall then exited the Carabao Cup following a 1–0 loss to Charlton Athletic.

9 August 2022 First round	Walsall	2–0	Swindon Town	Bescot
19:45 BST	Johnson 80' (pen.); Abraham 81'	Report	Minturn (red card) 78'; Adeloye (yellow card) 81'; Cian Harries (yellow card) 85'; Darcy (yellow card) 90+5'	Stadium: Bescot Stadium; Attendance: 2,889; Referee: Thomas Parsons

23 August 2022 Second round	Walsall	0–1	Charlton Athletic	Bescot
19:00 BST	Williams (yellow card) 45+1'; Monthe (yellow card) 53'; Knowles (yellow card) 55'; White (yellow card) 87'	Report	Jaiyesimi 57'; Forster-Caskey (yellow card) 78'; Kirk (yellow card) 90+2'	Stadium: Bescot Stadium; Attendance: 2,954; Referee: Ollie Yates

=== EFL Trophy ===
On 20 June, the initial Group stage draw was made, grouping Walsall with Cheltenham Town and Milton Keynes Dons. Three days later, West Ham United U21s joined Southern Group C.

Pos	Div	Team	Pld	W	PW	PL	L	GF	GA	GD	Pts	Qualification
1	L1	Milton Keynes Dons	3	2	0	0	1	5	2	+3	6	Advance to Round 2
2	L1	Cheltenham Town	3	2	0	0	1	5	4	+1	6	Advance to Round 2
3	ACA	West Ham United U21	3	2	0	0	1	3	3	0	6	
4	L2	Walsall	3	0	0	0	3	1	5	−4	0	

Source: EFL.com

Win Draw Loss Fixtures

30 August 2022 Group stage	Walsall	0–1	West Ham United U21s	Bescot
19:00 BST	Hutchinson (yellow card) 90+1'	Report	Simon-Swyer 57'; Potts (yellow card) 69'; Ekwah (yellow card) 90+5'; Woods (yellow card) 90+6'	Stadium: Bescot Stadium; Attendance: 1,582; Referee: Simon Mather

20 September 2022 Group stage	Cheltenham Town	2–1	Walsall	Cheltenham
19:00 BST	Perry (yellow card) 9'; Nlundulu 38', (yellow card) 46'; Sercombe 43'; May (yellow card) 89'	Report	White (yellow card) 46'; Johnson 86'	Stadium: Whaddon Road; Attendance: 1,275; Referee: Tom Reeves

18 October 2022 Group stage	Walsall	0–2	Milton Keynes Dons	Bescot
19:00 BST	Maddox (yellow card) 66'; Comley (yellow card) 84'; Bennett (yellow card) 85'; Allen (yellow card) 90+2'	Report	Lawrence 62'; Holland 90+3'	Stadium: Bescot Stadium; Attendance: 1,070; Referee: Scott Tallis
