= Tom Knowles (footballer) =

English footballer

Personal information
- Full name: Thomas Andrew Knowles
- Date of birth: 27 September 1998 (age 28)
- Place of birth: Cambridge, England
- Height: 6 ft 0 in (1.83 m)
- Positions: Midfielder; forward

Team information
- Current team: Barnet
- Number: 7

Youth career
- Newmarket Town
- 2016–2017: Cambridge United

Senior career*
| Years | Team | Apps | (Gls) |
| 2017–2020 | Cambridge United | 4 | (1) |
| 2017 | → St Neots Town (loan) | 11 | (0) |
| 2017 | → Cambridge City (loan) | 21 | (9) |
| 2018 | → St Ives Town (loan) | 15 | (4) |
| 2018 | → Dartford (loan) | 3 | (0) |
| 2018–2019 | → Hemel Hempstead Town (loan) | 5 | (1) |
| 2019 | → Kettering Town (loan) | 1 | (1) |
| 2019 | → Royston Town (loan) | 9 | (3) |
| 2019–2020 | → Chelmsford City (loan) | 18 | (4) |
| 2020–2022 | Yeovil Town | 75 | (16) |
| 2022–2024 | Walsall | 77 | (5) |
| 2024–2026 | Forest Green Rovers | 85 | (12) |
| 2026– | Barnet | 14 | (4) |
- * Club domestic league appearances and goals as of 17:41, 22 November 2026 (UTC)

Thomas Andrew Knowles (born 27 September 1998) is an English professional footballer who plays as a midfielder and forward for EFL League Two club Barnet.

Having started his career at his hometown club Cambridge United, he had loan spells with St Neots Town, Cambridge City, St Ives Town, Hemel Hempstead Town and Kettering Town. In November 2020, he signed for Yeovil Town who he spent two years with before his move to Walsall.

== Career ==
=== Cambridge United ===
Knowles graduated through the Cambridge United Shadow Scholars Academy to win a place in the club's youth-team in 2016. He was a part of the under-18 team that reached the fourth round of the FA Youth Cup in the 2016–17 season. On 4 February 2017, he joined Southern League Premier Division side St Neots Town on a one-month loan deal, along with "U's" teammate Fernando Bell-Toxtle. He made 12 appearances for the "Saints". He signed a six-month development contract with United at the end of the 2016–17 season, with Academy manager Mark Bonner commenting that Knowles had "taken ownership for his development and shown a willingness to learn and improve". On 3 August 2017, he joined Southern League Division One Central club Cambridge City on an initial one-month loan deal. He scored a hat-trick for the club in a 7–3 win over Arlesey Town on 23 October. Having scored ten goals in 28 appearances for the "Lilywhites", he was recalled by United manager Shaun Derry in order to sit on the bench in a league fixture against Notts County.

On 8 January 2018, he joined St Ives Town of the Southern League Premier Central on an initial 28-day youth loan. He signed a one-year contract extension with United the following month. He was recalled to Cambridge United by new manager Joe Dunne on 20 April after picking up several Man of the Match awards and scoring four goals during his 16 appearances for the "Saints". He made his first-team debut on the final day of the 2017–18 season, coming on as a 72nd-minute substitute for David Amoo in a 5–0 victory over Port Vale at the Abbey Stadium on 5 May.

On 31 August 2018, Knowles joined Dartford on an initial month's loan. After returning to Cambridge United later that season he scored his first goal for them in a 2-1 defeat to Morecambe on 27 April 2019.

He was offered a new contract by Cambridge United at the end of the 2018–19 season.

On 17 October 2019, Knowles signed for Chelmsford City on an initial one-month loan. On 3 March 2020, after previously having his loan deal extended until the end of the season, Knowles was recalled by Cambridge.

=== Yeovil Town ===
On 30 November 2020, Knowles joined National League side Yeovil Town for an undisclosed fee signing a contract until the end of the 2021–22 season.

=== Walsall ===
On 4 August 2022, Knowles signed for League Two side Walsall for an undisclosed fee.

Following the conclusion of the 2023–24 season, the club confirmed that they were in talks with Knowles regarding a new contract.

=== Forest Green Rovers ===
On 5 June 2024, Knowles agreed to join Forest Green Rovers following their relegation to the National League.

On 22 May 2026 the club said Knowles was leaving the club after a paperwork error meant it did not have ability to extend his contract.

=== Barnet ===
Barnet announced the signing of Knowles on 24 June 2026.

== Career statistics ==
As of match played 21 November 2026

Appearances and goals by club, season and competition
| Club | Season | League | | | FA Cup | | EFL Cup | | Other | | Total | |
| Club | Season | Division | Apps | Goals | Apps | Goals | Apps | Goals | Apps | Goals | Apps | Goals |
|---|---|---|---|---|---|---|---|---|---|---|---|---|
| Cambridge United | 2016–17 | League Two | 1 | 0 | 0 | 0 | 0 | 0 | 0 | 0 | 1 | 0 |
| Cambridge United | 2017–18 | League Two | 1 | 0 | 0 | 0 | 0 | 0 | 0 | 0 | 1 | 0 |
| Cambridge United | 2018–19 | League Two | 3 | 1 | 0 | 0 | 1 | 0 | 1 (Note: Appearance(s) in EFL Trophy) | 0 | 5 | 1 |
| Cambridge United | 2019–20 | League Two | 0 | 0 | 0 | 0 | 1 | 0 | 0 | 0 | 1 | 0 |
| Cambridge United | 2020–21 | League Two | 0 | 0 | 1 | 0 | 1 | 0 | 3 | 1 | 5 | 1 |
| Cambridge United | Total | | 4 | 1 | 1 | 0 | 3 | 0 | 4 | 1 | 12 | 2 |
| St Neots Town (loan) | 2016–17 | SL Premier Division | 11 | 0 | 0 | 0 | — | | 1 (Note: Appearance in Huntingdonshire Senior Cup) | 0 | 12 | 0 |
| Cambridge City (loan) | 2017–18 | SL East Division | 21 | 9 | 4 | 1 | — | | 3 (Note: Two appearances in FA Trophy, one appearance in Southern Football League Cup) | 0 | 28 | 10 |
| St Ives Town (loan) | 2017–18 | SL Premier Division | 15 | 4 | — | | — | | 1 | 0 | 16 | 4 |
| Dartford (loan) | 2018–19 | National League South | 3 | 0 | 0 | 0 | — | | 0 | 0 | 3 | 0 |
| Hemel Hempstead Town (loan) | 2018–19 | National League South | 5 | 1 | 0 | 0 | — | | 3 (Note: Appearance(s) in FA Trophy) | 1 | 8 | 2 |
| Kettering Town (loan) | 2018–19 | SL Premier Division Central | 1 | 1 | 0 | 0 | — | | 0 | 0 | 1 | 1 |
| Royston Town (loan) | 2018–19 | SL Premier Division Central | 9 | 3 | 0 | 0 | — | | 0 | 0 | 9 | 3 |
| Chelmsford City (loan) | 2019–20 | National League South | 18 | 4 | 0 | 0 | — | | 6 (Note: Four appearances and one goal in FA Trophy, two appearances in Essex Senior Cup) | 1 | 24 | 5 |
| Yeovil Town | 2020–21 | National League | 33 | 7 | — | | — | | 0 | 0 | 33 | 7 |
| Yeovil Town | 2021–22 | National League | 42 | 9 | 5 | 0 | — | | 3 (Note: Two appearances and one goal in FA Trophy, one appearance and one goal in Somerset Premier Cup) | 2 | 50 | 11 |
| Yeovil Town | Total | | 75 | 16 | 5 | 0 | — | | 3 | 2 | 83 | 18 |
| Walsall | 2022–23 | League Two | 44 | 5 | 4 | 0 | 2 | 0 | 2 | 0 | 52 | 5 |
| Walsall | 2023–24 | League Two | 33 | 0 | 4 | 1 | 0 | 0 | 3 | 1 | 40 | 2 |
| Walsall | Total | | 77 | 5 | 8 | 1 | 2 | 0 | 5 | 1 | 92 | 7 |
| Forest Green Rovers | 2024–25 | National League | 40 | 2 | 2 | 0 | — | | 4 (Note: Three appearances in FA Trophy, one appearance in National League Cup, one appearance in National League play-offs) | 0 | 46 | 2 |
| Forest Green Rovers | 2025–26 | National League | 45 | 10 | 2 | 2 | — | | 6 (Note: Two appearances in FA Trophy, three appearances and one goal in National League Cup, one appearance in National League play-offs) | 1 | 53 | 13 |
| Forest Green Rovers | Total | | 85 | 12 | 4 | 2 | — | | 10 | 1 | 99 | 15 |
| Barnet | 2026–27 | League Two | 14 | 4 | 1 | 0 | 1 | 0 | 3 | 3 | 19 | 7 |
| Career total | | | 338 | 60 | 23 | 4 | 6 | 0 | 39 | 10 | 406 | 74 |
