= 2025 EFL League Two play-off final =

Association football match

2025 EFL League Two play-off Final
- Wembley Stadium in London hosted the final
AFC Wimbledon	Walsall
1	0
- Date: 26 May 2025
- Venue: Wembley Stadium, London
- Referee: Will Finnie
- Attendance: 50,947

The 2025 EFL League Two play-off final was an association football match which was played on 26 May 2025 at Wembley Stadium, London, to determine the fourth and final team to gain promotion from EFL League Two, the fourth tier of English football, to EFL League One. The top three teams of 2024–25 EFL League Two, Doncaster Rovers, Port Vale and Bradford City, gained automatic promotion to League One, while the clubs placed from fourth to seventh in the table – Walsall, Wimbledon, Notts County and Chesterfield – took part in the 2025 EFL play-offs. The winners of the play-off semi-finals, AFC Wimbledon and Walsall, competed for the final place for the 2025–26 season in League One.

Wimbledon won the game 1–0 and were promoted to play in League One for the 2025–26 League One season.

== Route to the final ==
EFL League Two final table, leading positions
Pos	Team	Pld	W	D	L	GF	GA	GD	Pts
1	Doncaster Rovers (C, P)	46	24	12	10	73	50	+23	84
2	Port Vale (P)	46	22	14	10	65	46	+19	80
3	Bradford City (P)	46	22	12	12	64	45	+19	78
4	Walsall	46	21	14	11	75	54	+21	77
5	AFC Wimbledon	46	20	13	13	56	35	+21	73
6	Notts County	46	20	12	14	68	49	+19	72
7	Chesterfield	46	19	13	14	73	54	+19	70

Source: EFL Official Website
(C) Champions; (P) Promoted

Walsall finished the regular 2024–25 season in fourth place in EFL League Two, the fourth tier of the English football league system. They finished 1 point behind Bradford City (who were promoted in third place), 3 behind second-placed Port Vale and 7 points behind league winners Doncaster Rovers. Walsall had been top of the division in mid-January, 15 points clear of fourth place, but a poor run of form saw them miss out on the play-offs on the season's final day. They played seventh placed Chesterfield in a two-leg semi-final. The first leg was played at Chesterfield's SMH Group Stadium on 6 May. Walsall won the game 2–0, taking the lead through a Taylor Allen penalty before Alfie Chang added a second goal. Walsall also won the second leg, recording a 2–1 victory on 16 May at Bescot Stadium. Charlie Lakin and Levi Amantchi scored for Walsall, with Armando Dobra scoring for Chesterfield. Their win meant a 4–1 aggregate win and a place in the play-off final.

AFC Wimbledon finished in fifth place, 4 points behind Walsall. Like Wallsall, AFC Wimbledon had been in contention for automatic promotion earlier in the season, having been in third place in late March but then recording only two wins from their last nine games. They played sixth-placed Notts County in the semi-final. in the first leg, played on 10 May at Notts County's Meadow Lane stadium, AFC Wimbledon won 1–0, Riley Harbottle scoring the game's only goal. The second leg was played on 17 May at Plough Lane. After only eight minutes, Josh Neufville scored for AFC Wimbledon, with what proved to be the game's only goal. AFC Wimbledon thus won 2–0 on aggregate.

== Match ==
=== Background ===
The two finalists played each other twice during the regular season, with Walsall recording a 1–0 win at Plough Lane in November 2024, followed by a 1–1 draw at the Bescot Stadium in March 2025. Loan player Nathan Lowe was the highest scorer for Walsall with 15 league goals during the season, although he had departed the club in January, having been recalled by his permanent club Stoke City. Matty Stevens was AFC Wimbledon's top marksman with 17 goals during the league campaign.

The match was Walsall's second appearance at Wembley, their first being the 2015 Football League Trophy final which they lost to Bristol City. It was the club's third play-off final, following a 4–0 win in a replay against Bristol City in 1988 and a 3–2 victory over Reading in 2001. The match was AFC Wimbledon's second appearance at the national stadium and their second play-off final since they were founded in 2002, the other being a 2–0 win against Plymouth Argyle in 2016.

The referee for the match was Will Finnie. The assistant referees were Alistair Nelson and Conor Brown with Matt Sowerby as a reserve; the fourth official was Tom Kirk. James Bell and Marc Perry were named as the video assistant referee (VAR) and assistant video assistant referee respectively.

The match was televised live by Sky Sports on both its Premier League and Main Event channels and was also available for live streaming on Sky Go and NOW. BBC Local Radio stations covered the game for each team: BBC Radio WM for Walsall and BBC Radio London for AFC Wimbledon. BBC Radio 5 Live provided national radio commentary.

=== Match ===
The match kicked off at 3 p.m. in front of a crowd of 50,947, of whom more than 28,500 were AFC Wimbledon supporters and over 17,000 for Walsall. AFC Wimbledon were the more threatening side in the opening stages, though there were few clear chances for either side, the best being a shot by AFC Wimbledon's Marcus Browne after 30 minutes, which was saved by Walsall goalkeeper Tommy Simkin. Aside from this, their early efforts consisted mainly of long balls forward, which were handled by the Walsall defence. AFC Wimbledon had a further promising attack on 40 minutes when Stevens won the ball deep in Walsall territory, but his attempted pass to Alistair Smith was cleared. AFC Wimbledon took the lead in first-half stoppage time following a corner kick when Myles Hippolyte scored with a low shot into the corner after Browne's volley had been blocked by the Walsall defence. The half ended with Wimbledon ahead 1–0.

Walsall began to play more positively after the break and they almost equalised when a shot by Jamille Matt cleared off the line by Harbottle on 49 minutes. They brought on veteran player Albert Adomah and Amantchi after 62 minutes, and the latter had a chance to score shortly afterwards, his dinked shot being stopped by AFC Wimbledon goalkeeper Owen Goodman. Simkin then made a good save from Neufville's shot close to the goal. Further substitutions were made by both sides in an effort to influence the game, but further clear chances were limited. Following six minutes of stoppage time at the end of the game, AFC Wimbledon held on to complete a 1–0 win and earn a place in League One.

=== Details ===
26 May 2025
15:01 BST

AFC Wimbledon	1–0	Walsall
Hippolyte 45+2'	Report

Wembley Stadium, London
Attendance: 50,947
Referee: Will Finnie

AFC Wimbledon	Walsall

GK	1	(England) Owen Goodman
CB	26	(England) Riley Harbottle (substituted off) 69'
CB	31	(Wales) Joe Lewis
CB	6	(Northern Ireland) Ryan Johnson
RWB	7	(England) James Tilley
CM	12	(England) Alistair Smith
CM	4	(England) Jake Reeves (c)
CM	21	(Grenada) Myles Hippolyte 45+2', (substituted off) 90'
LWB	11	(England) Josh Neufville
CF	18	(England) Marcus Browne (substituted off) 90'
CF	14	(England) Matty Stevens (substituted off) 77'
Substitutes:
GK	22	(England) Lewis Ward
DF	33	(England) Isaac Ogundere (substituted on) 69'
MF	8	(England) Callum Maycock (substituted on) 90'
MF	16	(England) James Ball
MF	29	(Norway) Aron Sasu (substituted on) 90'
FW	10	(England) Josh Kelly (substituted on) 77'
FW	39	(England) Joe Pigott
Head Coach:
(England) Johnnie Jackson

GK	1	(England) Tommy Simkin
CB	26	(Republic of Ireland) David Okagbue
CB	24	(England) Harry Williams (substituted off) 34'
CB	21	(England) Taylor Allen
RM	19	(Uganda) Nathan Asiimwe (substituted off) 74'
CM	15	(England) Alfie Chang (substituted off) 74'
CM	25	(Wales) Ryan Stirk
LM	3	(Guyana) Liam Gordon
RW	22	(England) Jamie Jellis (substituted off) 62'
LW	20	(England) George Hall
CF	9	(Jamaica) Jamille Matt (c) (substituted off) 63'
Substitutes:
GK	12	(England) Sam Hornby
DF	2	(England) Connor Barrett (substituted on) 74'
DF	4	(Republic of Ireland) Oisin McEntee (substituted on) 34'
MF	8	(England) Charlie Lakin (substituted on) 74'
MF	14	(Montserrat) Brandon Comley
FW	11	(England) Levi Amantchi (substituted on) 63'
FW	37	(Ghana) Albert Adomah (substituted on) 62'
Head Coach:
(England) Mat Sadler
