= 2024–25 Walsall F.C. season =

137th season in existence of Walsall FC

Walsall
2024–25 season
- Owner: Trivela Group
- Co-chairman: Benjamin Boycott, Leigh Pomlett
- Head Coach: Mat Sadler
- Stadium: Bescot Stadium
- League Two: 4th
- FA Cup: Second round
- EFL Cup: Third round
- EFL Trophy: Round of 16
- Top goalscorer: League: Nathan Lowe (15); All: Nathan Lowe (18)

The 2024–25 season is the 137th season in the history of Walsall Football Club and their sixth consecutive season in League Two. The club are participating in the League Two, the FA Cup, the EFL Cup, and the EFL Trophy.

== Transfers ==
=== In ===
Date	Pos.	Player	From	Fee	Ref.
1 July 2024 (Note: The transfer was announced on 12 June, and would become official on July 1 once his AFC Fylde contract expired)	RB	Connor Barrett (ENG)	AFC Fylde (ENG)	Free	
1 July 2024	CF	Josh Gordon (ENG)	Burton Albion (ENG)	Free	
1 July 2024 (Note: The transfer was announced on 25 June, and would become official on July 1 once his Burton Albion contract expired)	CM	Charlie Lakin (ENG)	Burton Albion (ENG)	Free	
4 July 2024	CB	David Okagbue (IRL)	Stoke City (ENG)	Compensation	
23 July 2024	RW	Albert Adomah (GHA)	Queens Park Rangers (ENG)	Free	
24 July 2024	GK	Sam Hornby (ENG)	Colchester United (ENG)	Free	
19 September 2024	CB	Rico Browne (SKN)	Birmingham City (ENG)	Compensation	
15 January 2025	RB	Elicha Ahui (ENG)	Drogheda United (IRL)	Free	
31 January 2025	CF	Levi Amantchi (ENG)	Bromley (ENG)	Undisclosed	

=== Out ===
Date	Pos.	Player	To	Fee	Ref.
24 June 2024	CM	Isaac Hutchinson (ENG)	Bristol Rovers (ENG)	Undisclosed	
9 July 2024	GK	Jackson Smith (ENG)	Barnsley (ENG)	Compensation	

=== Loaned in ===
Date	Pos.	Player	From	Date until	Ref.
2 July 2024	GK	Tommy Simkin (ENG)	Stoke City (ENG)	End of season	
20 August 2024	CF	Reyes Cleary (ENG)	West Bromwich Albion (ENG)	7 January 2025 (Note: On 7 January, Cleary was recalled to West Bromwich Albion)	
22 August 2024	CF	Nathan Lowe (ENG)	Stoke City (ENG)	12 January 2025 (Note: On 12 January, Lowe was recalled to Stoke)	
30 August 2024	RW	George Hall (ENG)	Birmingham City (ENG)	End of season	
10 January 2025	RB	Nathan Asiimwe (UGA)	Charlton Athletic (ENG)	End of season	
25 January 2025	CF	Ethan Wheatley (ENG)	Manchester United (ENG)	End of season	
3 February 2025	DM	Alfie Chang (ENG)	Birmingham City (ENG)	End of season	
3 February 2025	CF	Ellis Harrison (WAL)	Milton Keynes Dons (ENG)	End of season	
3 February 2025	CM	Darius Lipsiuc (IRL)	Stoke City (ENG)	End of season	

=== Loaned out ===
Date	Pos.	Player	To	Date until	Ref.
1 July 2024 (Note: The loan was announced on 22 May, and would officially commence on July 1)	CF	Douglas James-Taylor (ENG)	Drogheda United (IRL)	End of season	
2 August 2024	CF	Charlie Wragg (ENG)	Bromsgrove Sporting (ENG)	13 August 2024 (Note: Wragg was recalled early from his three-month loan at Bromsgrove.)	
17 August 2024	CF	Charlie Wragg (ENG)	Bromsgrove Sporting (ENG)	2 November 2024	
30 August 2024	GK	George Barrett (ENG)	Worcester City (ENG)	30 September 2024	
20 September 2024	CF	Dylan Thomas (ENG)	Bromsgrove Sporting (ENG)	20 October 2024	
8 October 2024	CB	Rico Browne (SKN)	Tamworth (ENG)	5 November 2024	
31 October 2024	CF	Charlie Wragg (ENG)	Alvechurch (ENG)	1 January 2025	
22 November 2024	LM	Ronan Maher (IRL)	Tamworth (ENG)	21 December 2024	
15 January 2025	RB	Elicha Ahui (ENG)	Drogheda United (IRL)	31 December 2025	
7 February 2025	LM	Ronan Maher (IRL)	Tamworth (ENG)	8 April 2025 (Note: On 11 March, Maher's loan at Tamworth was extended for a further month)	

=== Released / Out of Contract ===
Date	Pos.	Player	Subsequent club	Join date	Ref.
30 June 2024	LW	Tom Knowles (ENG)	Forest Green Rovers (ENG)	1 July 2024	
30 June 2024	RB	Joe Riley (ENG)	AFC Fylde (ENG)	1 July 2024	
30 June 2024	GK	Owen Evans (WAL)	Cheltenham Town (ENG)	3 July 2024	
30 June 2024	RB	Joe Foulkes (ENG)	Kidderminster Harriers (ENG)	4 July 2024	
30 June 2024	CB	Rollin Menayese (WAL)	Aldershot Town (ENG)	22 August 2024	
30 June 2024	CF	Aramide Oteh (ENG)	The New Saints (WAL)	13 September 2024	

== Pre-season and friendlies ==
On 25 April, Walsall announced their first pre-season friendly, against Aston Villa. A month later, the club confirmed a further two pre-season matches, against Alvechurch and Tamworth. A trip to Ireland was also confirmed, along with a fixture versus Drogheda United. On June 3, a fifth fixture was added, versus Solihull Moors. Over a week later, a visit from Birmingham City was also added.

Win Draw Loss Fixtures

13 July 2024 Friendly	Alvechurch	0–3	Walsall	Alvechurch
15:00 BST		Report	Williams 45'; Lakin 49'; Jellis 85'	Stadium: Lye Meadow

17 July 2024 Friendly	Walsall	0–3	Aston Villa	Bescot
19:30 BST		Report	Rogers 21', 36'; Barry 90'	Stadium: Bescot Stadium; Attendance: 8,200

20 July 2024 Friendly	Tamworth	2–3	Walsall	Tamworth
15:00 BST	Finn 40'; Trialist 86'	Report	Jellis; Trialist 77'; Thomas 87'	Stadium: The Lamb Ground; Attendance: 1,462

23 July 2024 Friendly	Walsall	1–2	Lincoln City	Bescot
17:00 GMT	Jellis 65'	Report	Makama 30'; Bayliss 39'	Stadium: Bescot Stadium; Attendance: 0 (Behind-closed-doors)

27 July 2024 Friendly	Walsall	0–1	Birmingham City	Bescot
13:00 BST		Report	May 60'	Stadium: Bescot Stadium; Attendance: 4,334

30 July 2024 Friendly	Drogheda United	1–1 (4–3 p)	Walsall	Drogheda, Republic of Ireland
19:00 BST	James-Taylor 74' (pen.)	Report	Maher 77'	Stadium: Weavers Park
	Penalties
	James-Taylor (penalty scored); Pierrot (penalty scored); O'Brien (penalty missed); Keaney (penalty scored); Feehan (penalty scored)		Lakin (penalty missed); Maher (penalty missed); McEntee (penalty scored); Allen (penalty scored); Barrett (penalty missed)

3 August 2024 Friendly	Solihull Moors	0–0	Walsall	Solihull
15:00 BST		Report		Stadium: Damson Park

== Competitions ==
=== League Two ===
==== League table ====
Pos	Team	Pld	W	D	L	GF	GA	GD	Pts	Promotion, qualification or relegation
2	Port Vale (P)	46	22	14	10	65	46	+19	80	Promotion to EFL League One
3	Bradford City (P)	46	22	12	12	64	45	+19	78	Promotion to EFL League One
4	Walsall	46	21	14	11	75	54	+21	77	Qualification for League Two play-offs
5	AFC Wimbledon (O, P)	46	20	13	13	56	35	+21	73	Qualification for League Two play-offs
6	Notts County	46	20	12	14	68	49	+19	72	Qualification for League Two play-offs

Source: EFL Official Website
Rules for classification: 1) Points; 2) Goal difference; 3) Number of goals scored; 4) Head-to-head results; 5) Wins; 6) Away goals; 7) Penalty points (sec 9.5); 8) 12-point sending off offences
(O) Play-off winners; (P) Promoted

==== Results summary ====
Overall								Home						Away					
Pld	W	D	L	GF	GA	GD	Pts	W	D	L	GF	GA	GD	W	D	L	GF	GA	GD
45	20	14	11	74	54	+20	74	12	6	5	46	32	+14	8	8	6	28	22	+6

Last updated: 26 April 2025.
Source: Soccerway

==== Results by round ====
Round	1	2	3	4	5	6	7	8	9	10	12	13	14	15	17	11^{1}	18	19	20	21	22	23	24	26	27	28	29	30	31	16^{2}	32	33	25^{3}	34	35	36	37	38	39	40	41	42	43	44	45	46
Ground	H	A	A	H	A	H	A	H	H	A	A	H	A	H	A	H	H	A	H	A	H	H	A	H	H	A	A	H	A	H	H	A	A	H	A	H	A	A	H	A	H	A	H	A	H	A
Result	W	W	L	W	L	W	W	W	L	D	W	W	D	D	W	D	W	W	W	W	W	W	W	W	W	L	L	D	L	D	W	W	D	L	D	L	D	D	D	D	L	L	D	D	L	W
Position	10	1	5	2	6	5	3	2	3	2	3	2	2	2	2	2	2	1	1	1	1	1	1	1	1	1	1	1	1	1	1	1	1	1	1	1	1	1	1	1	3	4	4	4	4	4
Points	3	6	6	9	9	12	15	18	18	19	22	25	26	27	30	31	34	37	40	43	46	49	52	55	58	58	58	59	59	60	63	66	67	67	68	68	69	70	71	72	72	72	73	74	74	77

Source: EFL
A = Away; H = Home; W = Win; D = Draw; L = Loss; P = Postponed
Notes:
- ^{1} Matchday 11 (vs. Bromley) was postponed due to international call-ups.
- ^{2} Matchday 16 (vs. Gillingham) was postponed due to international call-ups.
- ^{3} Matchday 25 (vs. Cheltenham Town) was postponed due to a frozen pitch.

==== Matches ====
On 26 June, the League Two fixtures were announced.

Win Draw Loss Fixtures

10 August 2024 1	Walsall	1–0	Morecambe	Walsall
15:00 BST	Allen 20'; J. Gordon (yellow card) 25'; Adomah (yellow card) 62'	Report		Stadium: Bescot Stadium; Attendance: 5,226; Referee: James Durkin

17 August 2024 2	Swindon Town	0–4	Walsall	Swindon
15:00 BST	Smith (yellow card) 37'; Clarke (yellow card) 48'	Report	J. Gordon 33'; Matt 41'; Allen 49'; Adomah 64'	Stadium: County Ground; Attendance: 7,786; Referee: Lee Swabey

24 August 2024 3	Tranmere Rovers	1–0	Walsall	Birkenhead
12:30 BST	Patrick 13'; Davison (yellow card) 37'; Turnbull (yellow card) 78'	Report	Matt (penalty missed) 5', (yellow card) 82'; Farquharson (yellow card) 38'; Barrett (yellow card) 60'; McEntee (yellow card) 77'	Stadium: Prenton Park; Attendance: 6,145; Referee: Thomas Parsons
Note: Fixture was initially scheduled for a 15:00 kick-off, but was moved for live Sky Sports broadcast.

31 August 2024 4	Walsall	2–1	Cheltenham Town	Walsall
15:00 BST	L. Gordon (yellow card) 38'; Lowe 48'; Matt 66'; Jellis (yellow card) 76'; Lakin (yellow card) 86'; Okagbue (yellow card) 89'	Report	Stubbs (yellow card) 12'; Jude-Boyd (yellow card) 73'; Miller 85'	Stadium: Bescot Stadium; Attendance: 5,760; Referee: Paul Marsden

7 September 2024 5	Milton Keynes Dons	1–0	Walsall	Milton Keynes
15:00 BST	Hendry 18', (yellow card) 68'	Report	Weir (yellow card) 13'; Jellis (yellow card) 63'	Stadium: Stadium MK; Attendance: 6,547; Referee: James Oldham

14 September 2024 6	Walsall	2–1	Bradford City	Walsall
15:00 BST	Allen 19' (pen.); Johnson 88'	Report	Smallwood (yellow card) 12'; Sanderson 38'	Stadium: Bescot Stadium; Attendance: 5,967; Referee: Lewis Smith

21 September 2024 7	Salford City	0–2	Walsall	Salford
15:00 BST	Garbutt (yellow card) 31'	Report	Allen (yellow card) 38'; Lowe 51'; Lakin 57', (yellow card) 65'; L. Gordon (yellow card) 86'; Williams (yellow card) 90+5'	Stadium: Moor Lane; Attendance: 2,860; Referee: Declan Bourne

28 September 2024 8	Walsall	4–0	Colchester United	Walsall
12:30 BST	Jellis 39'; Barrett (yellow card) 45+1'; Adomah 79'; Earing 89', 90+2'	Report	Taylor (yellow card) 15'; Flanagan (yellow card) 21'; Woodyard (yellow card) 32'	Stadium: Bescot Stadium; Attendance: 5,140; Referee: Farai Hallam
Note: Fixture was initially scheduled for a 15:00 kick-off, but was moved for live Sky Sports broadcast.

1 October 2024 9	Walsall	2–6	Fleetwood Town	Walsall
19:45 BST	Williams 14'; Matt 45'	Report	Coughlan 25', 51' (pen.); Bennett (yellow card) 45+2'; Hughes 57', 67'; Virtue 85'; Helm 90+4'; Harrington (yellow card) 90+6'	Stadium: Bescot Stadium; Attendance: 4,237; Referee: Dale Baines

5 October 2024 10	Chesterfield	2–2	Walsall	Chesterfield
15:00 BST	Oldaker 45+1'; Markanday 67'	Report	Lowe 33', 46'	Stadium: SMH Group Stadium; Attendance: 9,035; Referee: Seb Stockbridge

19 October 2024 12	Grismby Town	1–4	Walsall	Cleethorpes
15:00 BST	McEachran (yellow card) 35'; Wilson 87'; Carson (yellow card) 90+3'	Report	Matt 56'; Jellis 69'; Lowe 74'; Johnson 90+1'	Stadium: Blundell Park; Attendance: 5,984; Referee: Scott Jackson

22 October 2024 13	Walsall	3–1	Carlisle United	Walsall
19:45 BST	Lowe 2'; Jellis (yellow card) 44', (goal) 49'; Matt (yellow card) 53', (goal) 56'	Report	Thomas (yellow card) 22'; Lavelle (yellow card) 55'; Mellish 82'	Stadium: Bescot Stadium; Attendance: 4,939; Referee: Scott Oldham

26 October 2024 14	Accrington Stanley	0–0	Walsall	Accrington
15:00 BST	Love (yellow card) 54'	Report		Stadium: Crown Ground; Attendance: 2,595; Referee: Scott Tallis

9 November 2024 15	Walsall	1–1	Crewe Alexandra	Walsall
15:00 GMT	Okagbue (yellow card) 40'; Matt (yellow card) 63'; Lowe 85'; Allen (yellow card) 88'; L. Gordon (yellow card) 90+10'	Report	Sanders (yellow card) 20'; Bogle 66'; Cooney (yellow card) 75'; Tracey (yellow card) 77'; Thibaut (yellow card) 89'	Stadium: Bescot Stadium; Attendance: 8,105; Referee: Stephen Parkinson

23 November 2024 17	AFC Wimbledon	0–1	Walsall	Wimbledon
15:00 GMT	Smith (yellow card) 76'; Bugiel (yellow card) 90+3'	Report	Matt (yellow card) 13'; Daniels (yellow card) 49'; Lowe 52'; Simkin (yellow card) 65'; Comley (yellow card) 89'; Stirk (yellow card) 90+3'	Stadium: Plough Lane; Attendance: 7,519; Referee: James Durkin

26 November 2024 11	Walsall	2–2	Bromley	Walsall
19:45 GMT	Gordon 40'; Okagbue 90+4'	Report	Cheek 59'; Webster (yellow card) 74'; Imray 77'	Stadium: Bescot Stadium; Attendance: 4,424; Referee: Michael Barlow
Note: Fixture was originally scheduled for 12 October, but was postponed due to international call-ups.

3 December 2024 18	Walsall	3–2	Notts County	Walsall
19:45 GMT	Barrett (yellow card) 49'; Allen 57'; Hall 64'; Simkin (yellow card) 74'; Lowe 86'	Report	McGoldrick 74' (pen.); Hinchy 90+4'	Stadium: Bescot Stadium; Attendance: 5,720; Referee: David Rock

7 December 2024 19	Port Vale	0–1	Walsall	Stoke-on-Trent
12:30 GMT		Report	Matt 51'; Barrett (yellow card) 56'; Okagbue (yellow card) 59'; Gordon (yellow card) 80'	Stadium: Vale Park; Attendance: 9,142; Referee: Ben Speedie
Note: Fixture was initially scheduled for a 15:00 kick-off, but was moved for live Sky Sports broadcast.

14 December 2024 20	Walsall	1–0	Barrow	Walsall
15:00 GMT	Allen 28'; Matt (yellow card) 53'; Adomah (yellow card) 86'	Report	Tiensia (yellow card) 45'; Vassell (yellow card) 73'; Dallas (yellow card) 90+6'	Stadium: Bescot Stadium; Attendance: 5,109; Referee: Andrew Humphries

21 December 2024 21	Harrogate Town	0–2	Walsall	Harrogate
15:00 GMT	March (yellow card) 35' (yellow-red card) 38'; Foulds (yellow card) 76'	Report	Lowe 34'; Adomah 69'	Stadium: Wetherby Road; Attendance: 2,843; Referee: Sam Mulhall

26 December 2024 22	Walsall	2–0	Doncaster Rovers	Walsall
15:00 GMT	Lowe 47'; Barrett (yellow card) 59'; Williams 79'; Gordon (yellow card) 88'	Report	Fleming (yellow card) 11'	Stadium: Bescot Stadium; Attendance: 7,320; Referee: Oliver Mackey

29 December 2024 23	Walsall	2–0	Newport County	Walsall
15:00 GMT	Williams (yellow card) 42'; Okagbue (yellow card) 66'; Lowe 73', 90+5'; Gordon (yellow card) 81'	Report	Glennon (yellow card) 20'	Stadium: Bescot Stadium; Attendance: 6,707; Referee: Carl Brook

1 January 2025 24	Notts County	1–2	Walsall	Nottingham
15:00 GMT	Jatta 26'; Platt (yellow card) 53'	Report	Barrett (yellow card) 45'; Matt 65'; Lowe 82'	Stadium: Meadow Lane; Attendance: 12,610; Referee: Farai Hallam

11 January 2025 26	Walsall	5–1	Tranmere Rovers	Walsall
12:30 GMT	Matt 15', 49'; Stirk 22'; McEntee (yellow card) 29'; Jellis (yellow card) 45+2', (goal) 72'; Lowe 80'	Report	Turnbull (yellow card) 22'; Davies (yellow card) 23'; Finley (yellow card) 29' (yellow-red card) 38'; Dennis (yellow card) 29'; Jennings 44'	Stadium: Bescot Stadium; Attendance: 5,614; Referee: Jeremy Simpson
Note: Fixture was initially scheduled for a 15:00 kick-off, but was moved for live Sky Sports broadcasting.

18 January 2025 27	Walsall	4–2	Milton Keynes Dons	Walsall
15:00 GMT	Adomah (yellow card) 26', (goal) 81'; Barrett (yellow card) 27'; Okagbue 22', (yellow card) 49'; L. Gordon 46'; Jellis (yellow card) 58'; Williams 66'	Report	Hogan 14'; Williams (yellow card) 23'; Offord (yellow card) 80'; Thompson-Sommers 85'	Stadium: Bescot Stadium; Attendance: 6,144; Referee: Scott Oldham

25 January 2025 28	Bradford City	3–0	Walsall	Bradford
12:30 GMT	Sarcevic 11'; Pattison 43', 53'	Report	McEntee (yellow card) 45+4'; Okagbue (yellow card) 59'; Johnson (penalty missed) 66'	Stadium: Valley Parade; Attendance: 17,172; Referee: Jacob Miles
Note: Fixture was initially scheduled for a 15:00 kick-off, but was moved for live Sky Sports broadcasting.

28 January 2025 29	Fleetwood Town	2–0	Walsall	Fleetwood
19:45 GMT	Rooney 12'; Bolton 17', (yellow card) 73'; Harratt (yellow card) 76'	Report	Jellis (yellow card) 39'	Stadium: Highbury Stadium; Referee: Martin Woods

1 February 2025 30	Walsall	2–2	Salford City	Walsall
15:00 GMT	L.Gordon (yellow card) 77'; Johnson 78', 87'; Jellis (yellow card) 82'; McEntee (yellow card) 90+6'	Report	Stockton 4'; Mnoga (yellow card) 45+3'; Adelakun 75'; Tilt (yellow card) 82'	Stadium: Bescot Stadium; Referee: James Bell

8 February 2025 31	Colchester United	2–1	Walsall	Colchester
15:00 GMT	Flanagan (yellow card) 53'; Kelleher (yellow card) 57'; Bishop 69'; Edwards 74'; Payne (yellow card) 83'	Report	Allen (yellow card) 19' (yellow-red card) 78'; Matt (yellow card) 62'; Lakin 65'; McEntee (yellow card) 89'; Barrett (yellow card) 90+9'	Stadium: Colchester Community Stadium; Attendance: 4,734; Referee: Lee Swabey

11 February 2025 16	Walsall	1–1	Gillingham	Walsall
19:45 GMT	Okagbue (yellow card) 6'; Williams (yellow card) 43'; Matt 49'; Jellis (yellow card) 58'; Barrett (yellow card) 59'	Report	Hutton (yellow card) 59' Corness (yellow card) 62': McKenzie 68'	Stadium: Bescot Stadium; Attendance: Thomas Parsons; Referee: 6,229
Note: Fixture was originally scheduled for 16 November, but was postponed due to international call-ups.

15 February 2025 32	Walsall	3–1	Chesterfield	Walsall
15:00 GMT	Williams (yellow card) 37'; Matt 52'; Harrison 55'; Jellis (yellow card) 78'; Amantchi 90+11'	Report	Grimes 8'; Thompson (yellow card) 31'; Dobra (yellow card) 55'	Stadium: Bescot Stadium; Attendance: Sunny Sukhvir Gill; Referee: 6,830

22 February 2025 33	Morecambe	0–2	Walsall	Morecambe
12:30 GMT	Williams (red card) 50'	Report	Allen 53'; Jellis 87'	Stadium: Mazuma Mobile Stadium; Attendance: 3,457; Referee: Ben Speedie
Note: Fixture was initially scheduled for a 15:00 kick-off, but was moved for live Sky Sports broadcasting.

25 February 2025 25	Cheltenham Town	2–2	Walsall	Cheltenham
19:45 GMT	Miller 90'; Thomas 90+3'		Harrison 1'; Adomah 79'	Stadium: Whaddon Road; Attendance: 4,454; Referee: Michael Barlow
Note: Fixture was initially scheduled for a 15:00 kick-off, but was moved for live Sky Sports broadcast. The match was then postponed on January 4, due to a frozen pitch.

1 March 2025 34	Walsall	0–1	Swindon Town	Walsall
15:00 GMT	Harrison (yellow card) 28'	Report	Clarke (yellow card) 22'; Cotterill 59'; Nichols (yellow card) 64'; Ofoboth (yellow card) 66'	Stadium: Bescot Stadium; Attendance: 6,910; Referee: Paul Howard

4 March 2025 35	Carlisle United	1–1	Walsall	Carlisle
19:45 GMT	Hayden 22', (yellow card) 85'; Embleton (yellow card) 60'; Davies (yellow card) 90+1'	Report	Allen 7'	Stadium: Brunton Park; Attendance: 6,378; Referee: Paul Marsden

8 March 2025 36	Walsall	1–3	Grimsby Town	Walsall
12:30 GMT	Harrison 6'; Stirk (yellow card) 29'; McEntee (yellow card) 63'; Barrett (yellow card) 85'	Report	Luker 21', 66', (yellow card) 66'; Rose 44' (pen.); Warren (yellow card) 45+2'; Svanþórsson (yellow card) 75'	Stadium: Bescot Stadium; Attendance: 6,255; Referee: Scott Jackson
Note: Fixture was initially scheduled for a 15:00 kick-off, but was moved for live Sky Sports broadcasting.

13 March 2025 37	Bromley	2–2	Walsall	Bromley
20:00 GMT	Thompson 7'; McKirdy 55'	Report	Okagbue (yellow card) 27'; Matt (yellow card) 40', (goal) 70'; Amantchi 45+1'; Barrett (yellow card) 81'	Stadium: Hayes Lane; Attendance: 2,512; Referee: Ruebyn Ricardo
Note: Fixture was initially scheduled for 15 March, but was moved for live Sky Sports broadcasting.

22 March 2025 38	Gillingham	0–0	Walsall	Gillingham
15:00 GMT	Little (yellow card) 90+5'	Report	McEntee (yellow card) 36'; Asiimwe (yellow card) 61'	Stadium: Priestfield Stadium; Attendance: 6,153; Referee: Andrew Humphries

29 March 2025 39	Walsall	1–1	AFC Wimbledon	Walsall
15:00 GMT	Matt (yellow card) 26'; Allen 87'	Report	Reeves (yellow card) 41'; Bugiel 70'; Ogundere (yellow card) 88'; Sasu (yellow card) 90+1'	Stadium: Bescot Stadium; Attendance: 9,203; Referee: Matt Corlett

1 April 2025 40	Doncaster Rovers	2–2	Walsall	Doncaster
19:45 GMT	Broadbent (yellow card) 5'; Molyneux 16'; Sterry (yellow card) 30'; Sharman-Lowe (yellow card) 67'; Sharp 84'	Report	Allen 18'; Weir (yellow card) 39'; L. Gordon (yellow card) 62'; Jellis (yellow card) 67'; McEntee (yellow card) 89'; Johnson 90'	Stadium: Eco-Power Stadium; Attendance: 7,796; Referee: James Oldham

5 April 2025 41	Walsall	2–3	Port Vale	Walsall
12:30 GMT	Allen 7' (pen.); Amantchi 11'; Gordon (yellow card) 32'; Asiimwe (yellow card) 44'; Okagbue (yellow card) 77'; McEntee (yellow card) 88'	Report	Tolaj 4', 45+2' (pen.), (yellow card) 30'; Garrity 41'; Hart (yellow card) 55'	Stadium: Bescot Stadium; Attendance: 8,446; Referee: Lewis Smith
Note: Fixture was initially scheduled for a 15:00 kick-off, but was moved for live Sky Sports broadcasting.

12 April 2025 42	Barrow	2–0	Walsall	Barrow-in-Furness
15:00 GMT	Jackson (yellow card) 11'; Pressley 23'; Canavan (yellow card) 83'; Acquah 90+3'	Report	Gordon (yellow card) 90'	Stadium: Holker Street; Attendance: 3,071; Referee: Stephen Martin

18 April 2025 43	Walsall	2–2	Harrogate Town	Walsall
15:00 GMT	O'Connor 16' (o.g.); Chang (yellow card) 84'; Gordon 88'; Stirk (yellow card) 90+2'	Report	March 22'; Moon (yellow card) 34'; Bilongo (yellow card) 37'; Taylor (yellow card) 43', (goal) 62'; Fox (yellow card) 51'	Stadium: Bescot Stadium; Attendance: 7,408; Referee: Scott Simpson

21 April 2025 44	Newport County	0–0	Walsall	Newport
12:30 GMT	Brennan (red card) 78'	Report	Adomah (yellow card) 37'	Stadium: Rodney Parade; Attendance: 4,578; Referee: Sam Purkiss
Note: Fixture was initially scheduled for a 15:00 kick-off, but was moved for live Sky Sports broadcasting.

26 April 2025 45	Walsall	0–1	Accrington Stanley	Walsall
15:00 GMT	Adomah (yellow card) 59'; Barrett (red card) 78'; Jellis (yellow card) 90+5'	Report	B. Woods 33'; O'Brien-Whitmarsh (yellow card) 59'; Walton (yellow card) 76'; Coyle (yellow card) 82'; J. Woods (yellow card) 90+2'	Stadium: Bescot Stadium; Attendance: 8,131; Referee: Alex Chilowicz

3 May 2025 46	Crewe Alexandra	0–1	Walsall	Crewe
15:00 GMT	Agius (yellow card) 62'; Sanders (yellow card) 72'	Report	Hall 59'	Stadium: Gresty Road; Attendance: 7,112; Referee: Matthew Corlett

==== Play-offs ====
Walsall finished 4th in the regular season, and were drawn against 7th place Chesterfield with the first leg away and the second leg at home. They lost 1–0 to AFC Wimbledon in the final at Wembley Stadium.

11 May 2025 1st Leg	Chesterfield	0–2	Walsall	Chesterfield
15:30 BST	Olakigbe (yellow card) 14'	Report	Allen 28' (pen.); Chang 39'	Stadium: SMH Group Stadium; Attendance: 10,001; Referee: Martin Coy

16 May 2025 2nd Leg	Walsall	2–1 (4–1 agg.)	Chesterfield	Bescot
20:00 BST	Asiimwe (yellow card) 36'; Allen (yellow card) 60'; Lakin 81'; Amantchi 90+5', (yellow card) 90+6'	Report	Metcalfe (yellow card) 51'; Fleck (yellow card) 65'; Dobra (yellow card) 76', (goal) 90+4'	Stadium: Bescot Stadium; Attendance: 9,585; Referee: Ben Toner

26 May 2025 Final	AFC Wimbledon	1–0	Walsall	Wembley
15:01 BST	Hippolyte 45+2'	Report		Stadium: Wembley Stadium; Attendance: 50,947; Referee: Will Finnie

=== FA Cup ===
Walsall were drawn at home to Bolton Wanderers in the first round, and then to Charlton Athletic in the second round.

Win Draw Loss Fixtures

2 November 2024 First round	Walsall	2–1	Bolton Wanderers	Walsall
15:00 GMT	Williams (yellow card) 53'; L. Gordon 59'; Jellis 90+1'; Matt (yellow card) 90+8'	Report	Sheehan 55'; Schön (yellow card) 59'; Matete (yellow card) 90+8'	Stadium: Bescot Stadium; Attendance: 6,684; Referee: Ruebyn Ricardo

30 November 2024 Second round	Walsall	0–4	Charlton Athletic	Walsall
15:00 GMT	Allen (yellow card) 57'	Report	Ahadme 16', 85'; Godden 28', (yellow card) 51'; Edmonds-Green (yellow card) 66'; Campbell 90+2'	Stadium: Bescot Stadium; Attendance: 6,161; Referee: Ollie Yates

=== EFL Cup ===
On 27 June, the draw for the first round was made, with Walsall being drawn at home against Exeter City. In the second round, they were drawn at home to Huddersfield Town. Another home tie was drawn for the third round, against Leicester City.

Win Draw Loss Fixtures

13 August 2024 First round	Walsall	1–1 (4–3 p)	Exeter City	Walsall
19:45 BST	J. Gordon (penalty missed) 81'; Jellis 90+3'; Stirk (yellow card) 90+4'	Report	Alli 40'; Cole (yellow card) 50'	Stadium: Bescot Stadium; Attendance: 2,352; Referee: Jacob Miles
	Penalties
	Earing (penalty missed); Okagbue (penalty scored); Matt (penalty scored); L. Gordon (penalty scored); J. Gordon (penalty scored)		(penalty scored) Magennis; (penalty missed) Niskanen; (penalty missed) Alli; (penalty scored) Fitzwater; (penalty scored) Aitchison

27 August 2024 Second round	Walsall	3–2	Huddersfield Town	Walsall
19:45 BST	Lowe (penalty missed) 51', 63', 70'; Helik 77' (o.g.); Jellis (yellow card) 82'	Report	Koroma 16'; Ruffels (yellow card) 22', (goal) 53'; Pearson (red card) 42'; Evans (yellow card) 45+3'	Stadium: Bescot Stadium; Attendance: 3,378; Referee: Edward Duckworth

24 September 2024 Third round	Walsall	0–0 (0–3 p)	Leicester City	Walsall
19:45 BST	Weir (yellow card) 83'; Jellis (yellow card) 90+1'; L. Gordon (yellow card) 90+5'	Report	Buonanotte (yellow card) 61'; Okoli (yellow card) 88'	Stadium: Bescot Stadium; Attendance: 8,010; Referee: Tom Nield
	Penalties
	Allen (penalty missed); Okagbue (penalty missed); L. Gordon (penalty missed)		(penalty scored) Pereira; (penalty scored) Coady; (penalty scored) Skipp

=== EFL Trophy ===
==== Group stage ====
In the group stage, Walsall were drawn into Southern Group A alongside Birmingham City, Shrewsbury Town and Fulham U21. Walsall were then drawn at home against Reading in the round of 32 and away to Peterborough United in the round of 16.

Pos	Div	Team	Pld	W	PW	PL	L	GF	GA	GD	Pts	Qualification
1	L2	Walsall	3	2	1	0	0	5	1	+4	8	Advance to Round 2
2	L1	Birmingham City	3	2	0	1	0	12	2	+10	7	Advance to Round 2
3	ACA	Fulham U21	3	1	0	0	2	3	9	−6	3	
4	L1	Shrewsbury Town	3	0	0	0	3	1	9	−8	0	

Source: EFL

Win Draw Loss Fixtures

3 September 2024 1	Birmingham City	1–1 (3–4 p)	Walsall	Birmingham
19:45 BST	Klarer 84'	Report	Lakin 48'; Maher (yellow card) 52'; Stirk (yellow card) 78'	Stadium: St Andrew's; Attendance: 9,752; Referee: Sam Purkiss
	Penalties
	Bielik (penalty scored); Jutkiewicz (penalty scored); Paik Seung-ho (penalty missed); Stansfield (penalty scored); May (penalty missed)		(penalty scored) Allen; (penalty scored) Lakin; (penalty missed) Matt; (penalty scored) Jellis; (penalty scored) Cleary

17 September 2024 2	Walsall	1–0	Fulham U21	Walsall
19:00 BST	Hall (yellow card) 42'; Okagbue (yellow card) 44'; Johnson 49'	Report	Šekularac (penalty missed) 89'	Stadium: Bescot Stadium; Attendance: 875; Referee: Martin Woods

12 November 2024 3	Walsall	3–0	Shrewsbury Town	Walsall
19:00 GMT	Cleary 53'; Hall 63'; Lowe 85'	Report	Winchester (yellow card) 33'; Shipley (yellow card) 78'	Stadium: Bescot Stadium; Attendance: 1,507; Referee: Zac Kennard-Kettle

==== Knockout stage ====
10 December 2024 Round of 32	Walsall	1–1 (4–2 p)	Reading	Walsall
19:00 GMT	Weir (yellow card) 17'; Johnson (yellow card) 90', (goal) 90+7'	Report	Savage (yellow card) 21'; Button (red card) 58'; Ahmed (yellow card) 70' (yellow-red card) 75'; Sackey 72'; Wareham (yellow card) 88'	Stadium: Bescot Stadium; Attendance: 1,501; Referee: Elliot Bell
	Penalties
	Adomah (penalty scored); Johnson (penalty scored); Daniels (penalty scored); Cleary (penalty scored)		(penalty missed) Wareham; (penalty scored) Holzman; (penalty missed) Wellens; (penalty scored) Kanu

14 January 2025 Round of 16	Peterborough United	4–2	Walsall	Peterborough
19:45 GMT	Lindgren 7', 31'; Mothersille 15' (pen.), 74'	Report	Johnson 30'; Comley (yellow card) 82'; J. Gordon 90+5'	Stadium: London Road Stadium; Attendance: 2,133; Referee: Scott Simpson

== Statistics ==
=== Appearances and goals ===
As of match played 16 May 2025

Players with no appearances are not included on the list
Italics indicate a loaned in player

No.	Pos	Nat	Player	Total		League Two		FA Cup		EFL Cup		EFL Trophy		League Two play-offs	
No.	Pos	Nat	Player	Apps	Goals	Apps	Goals	Apps	Goals	Apps	Goals	Apps	Goals	Apps	Goals
1	GK	(England) ENG	Tommy Simkin	46	0	40+0	0	2+0	0	2+0	0	0+0	0	2+0	0
2	DF	(England) ENG	Connor Barrett	52	0	39+4	0	2+0	0	3+0	0	1+3	0	0+0	0
3	DF	(Guyana) GUY	Liam Gordon	53	4	44+0	3	2+0	1	2+1	0	0+2	0	2+0	0
4	MF	(Republic of Ireland) IRL	Oisin McEntee	36	0	20+11	0	1+0	0	0+1	0	3+0	0	0+0	0
5	DF	(Montserrat) MSR	Donervon Daniels	11	0	4+3	0	0+1	0	0+0	0	2+0	0	0+1	0
6	DF	(England) ENG	Priestley Farquharson	3	0	3+0	0	0+0	0	0+0	0	0+0	0	0+0	0
8	MF	(England) ENG	Charlie Lakin	48	4	31+5	2	1+1	0	2+1	0	5+0	1	0+2	1
9	FW	(Jamaica) JAM	Jamille Matt	52	12	37+6	12	0+2	0	0+2	0	0+3	0	2+0	0
10	FW	(England) ENG	Josh Gordon	12	2	6+2	1	0+0	0	1+1	0	0+1	1	0+1	0
11	FW	(England) ENG	Levi Amantchi	20	4	4+14	3	0+0	0	0+0	0	0+0	0	0+2	1
12	GK	(England) ENG	Sam Hornby	12	0	6+0	0	0+0	0	1+0	0	5+0	0	0+0	0
14	MF	(Montserrat) MSR	Brandon Comley	21	0	5+12	0	1+0	0	0+0	0	1+0	0	0+2	0
15	MF	(England) ENG	Alfie Chang	7	1	3+2	0	0+0	0	0+0	0	0+0	0	2+0	1
16	MF	(Republic of Ireland) IRL	Ronan Maher	8	0	0+2	0	0+0	0	3+0	0	3+0	0	0+0	0
17	MF	(England) ENG	Jack Earing	28	2	4+16	2	1+1	0	1+1	0	4+0	0	0+0	0
19	DF	(Uganda) UGA	Nathan Asiimwe	12	0	7+3	0	0+0	0	0+0	0	0+0	0	2+0	0
20	FW	(England) ENG	George Hall	21	3	7+7	2	0+2	0	0+0	0	3+0	1	2+0	0
21	DF	(England) ENG	Taylor Allen	56	11	43+2	10	2+0	0	1+2	0	3+1	0	2+0	1
22	MF	(England) ENG	Jamie Jellis	54	7	39+4	5	2+0	1	0+3	1	0+4	0	2+0	0
23	FW	(Wales) WAL	Ellis Harrison	12	3	9+3	3	0+0	0	0+0	0	0+0	0	0+0	0
24	DF	(England) ENG	Harry Williams	39	3	29+1	3	2+0	0	3+0	0	2+0	0	2+0	0
25	MF	(Wales) WAL	Ryan Stirk	53	1	43+1	1	1+1	0	3+0	0	1+1	0	2+0	0
26	DF	(Republic of Ireland) IRL	David Okagbue	53	2	41+3	2	1+0	0	3+0	0	3+0	0	2+0	0
27	MF	(England) ENG	Dylan Thomas	1	0	0+0	0	0+0	0	0+0	0	0+1	0	0+0	0
30	DF	(Republic of Ireland) IRL	Evan Weir	23	0	8+7	0	0+0	0	3+0	0	5+0	0	0+0	0
33	DF	(Saint Kitts and Nevis) SKN	Rico Browne	3	0	0+0	0	0+0	0	0+0	0	3+0	0	0+0	0
34	FW	(England) ENG	Charlie Wragg	1	0	0+0	0	0+0	0	0+0	0	0+1	0	0+0	0
36	FW	(England) ENG	Ethan Wheatley	4	0	2+2	0	0+0	0	0+0	0	0+0	0	0+0	0
37	FW	(Ghana) GHA	Albert Adomah	53	5	11+31	5	2+0	0	3+0	0	4+0	0	0+2	0
39	FW	(England) ENG	Danny Johnson	29	8	1+22	5	0+1	0	0+1	0	4+0	3	0+0	0
Player(s) who featured whilst on loan but returned to parent club during the season:
7	FW	(England) ENG	Nathan Lowe	30	18	20+2	15	2+0	0	2+0	2	1+3	1	0+0	0
11	FW	(England) ENG	Reyes Cleary	7	1	0+3	0	0+0	0	0+0	0	2+2	1	0+0	0
