= Tommy Simkin =

English footballer (born 2004)

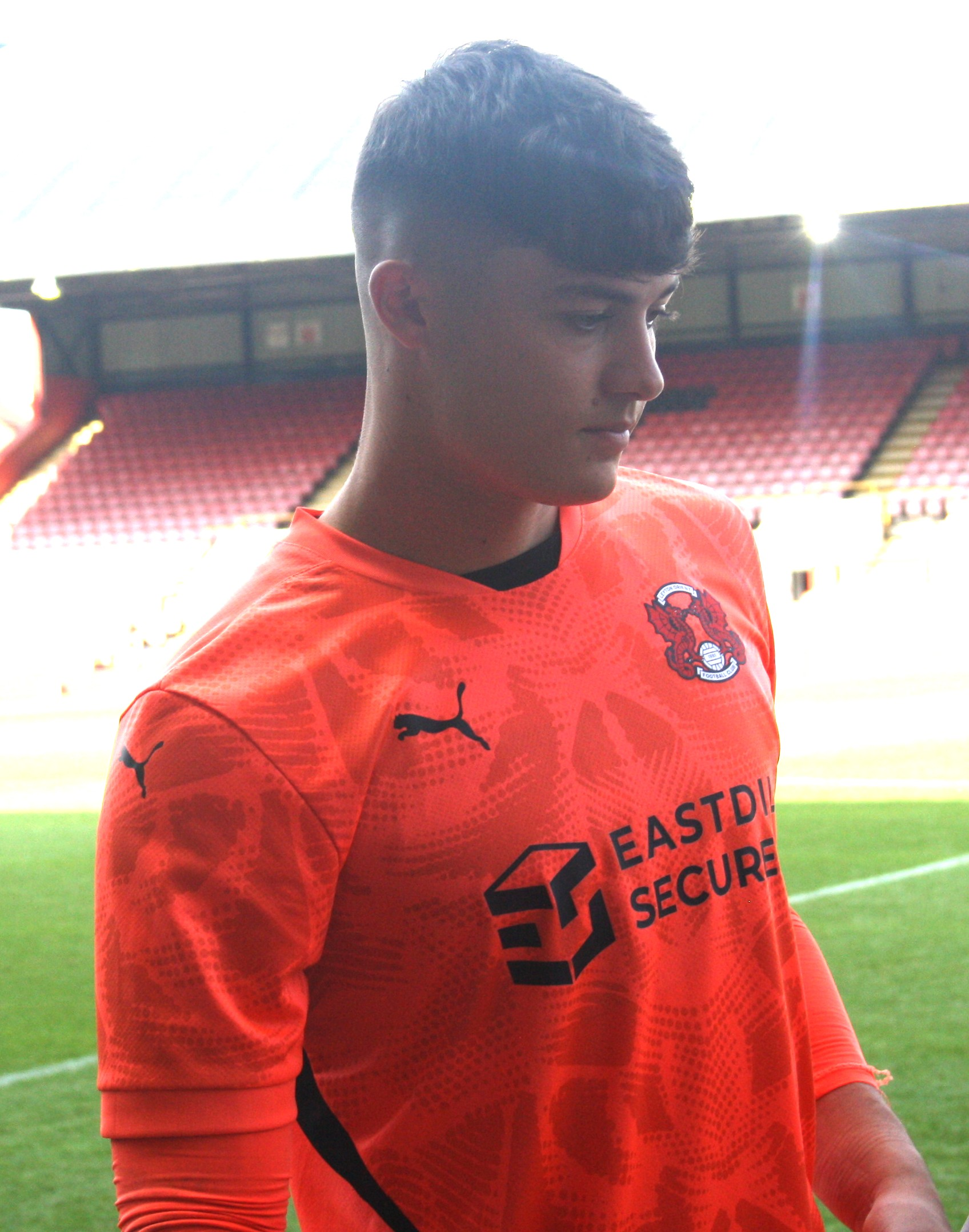
- Simkin with Leyton Orient in 2025.

Personal information
- Full name: Tommy James Simkin
- Date of birth: 8 December 2004 (age 21)
- Place of birth: Walsall, England
- Height: 1.90 m (6 ft 3 in)
- Position: Goalkeeper

Team information
- Current team: Doncaster Rovers (on loan from Stoke City)
- Number: 1

Youth career
- 2016–2023: Stoke City

Senior career*
Years	Team	Apps	(Gls)
2023–	Stoke City	16	(0)
2021	→ Hanley Town (loan)		
2022	→ AFC Fylde (loan)	0	(0)
2023	→ Solihull Moors (loan)	18	(0)
2024	→ Forest Green Rovers (loan)	1	(0)
2024–2025	→ Walsall (loan)	40	(0)
2025–2026	→ Leyton Orient (loan)	13	(0)
2026–	→ Doncaster Rovers (loan)	0	(0)

International career^{‡}
2021-2022	England U18	4	(0)
2024–	England U20	6	(0)
Medal record
Men's football
Representing England
UEFA European Under-21 Championship
Winner	2025 Slovakia
- * Club domestic league appearances and goals as of 19:16, 25 April 2026 (UTC) ‡ National team caps and goals as of 13:33, 17 November 2024 (UTC)

Tommy James Simkin (born 8 December 2004) is an English professional footballer who plays as a goalkeeper for EFL League One club Doncaster Rovers on loan from EFL Championship club Stoke City.

== Club career ==
=== Stoke City ===
Simkin progressed through the Stoke City Academy and signed a professional contract in April 2022. He joined National League North side AFC Fylde in July 2022 on a one-month youth loan. In July 2023, Simkin signed a new long-term contract with Stoke and joined National League side Solihull Moors on a season long loan. After making 19 appearances for the Moors he was recalled by Stoke on 10 November 2023 after injuries to their senior keepers. Simkin made his professional debut on 9 December 2023 in the Championship against Sheffield Wednesday after Jack Bonham was unavailable due to sickness. On 12 January 2024, Simkin joined League Two side Forest Green Rovers on loan for the remainder of the 2023–24 season. Simkin made one appearance for Forest Green which came in a 2–0 defeat against Harrogate Town on 13 January 2024. He returned to Stoke early in February 2024 after the departure of manager Troy Deeney.

Simkin joined his home town club, Walsall on loan for the 2024–25 season alongside teammate Nathan Lowe. Simkin established himself as Walsall's number one and with Lowe scoring regularly the Saddlers topped the table by January and had a 15-point cushion. However Lowe returned to Stoke and Walsall lost their form resulting in them missing out on automatic promotion on the final day. After beating Chesterfield in the play-offs they lost 1–0 to AFC Wimbledon in the 2025 EFL League Two play-off final.

On 18 July 2025, Simkin joined League One side Leyton Orient on loan for the 2025–26 season. Simkin made 15 appearances for Orient before being recalled by Stoke on 1 January 2026, after injury to first-choice Viktor Johansson. Stoke did bring in the more experienced Gavin Bazunu however he suffered injury on his debut and so Sminkin remained in goal for the remainder of the 2025–26 season, playing 17 times.

Simkin joined Doncaster Rovers on loan for the 2026–27 season.

== International career ==
Having previously represented England at U18 level, Simkin made his debut for the England Elite League squad as substitute during a 5-1 win over Poland at the Bialystok City Stadium on 22 March 2024.

== Career statistics ==
As of match played 25 April 2026

Appearances and goals by club, season and competition
Club	Season	League			FA Cup		League Cup		Other		Total	
Club	Season	Division	Apps	Goals	Apps	Goals	Apps	Goals	Apps	Goals	Apps	Goals
Stoke City	2022–23	Championship	0	0	0	0	0	0	—		0	0
Stoke City	2023–24	Championship	1	0	0	0	0	0	—		1	0
Stoke City	2024–25	Championship	0	0	0	0	0	0	—		0	0
Stoke City	2025–26	Championship	15	0	2	0	0	0	—		17	0
Stoke City	2026–27	Championship	0	0	0	0	0	0	—		0	0
Stoke City	Total		16	0	2	0	0	0	—		18	0
AFC Fylde (loan)	2022–22	National League North	0	0	0	0	0	0	—		0	0
Solihull Moors (loan)	2023–24	National League	18	0	1	0	0	0	—		19	0
Forest Green Rovers (loan)	2023–24	League Two	1	0	0	0	0	0	0	0	1	0
Walsall (loan)	2024–25	League Two	40	0	2	0	2	0	3 (Note: Appearances in EFL League Two play-offs)	0	47	0
Leyton Orient (loan)	2025–26	League One	13	0	0	0	0	0	2 (Note: Appearances in EFL Trophy)	0	15	0
Doncaster Rovers (loan)	2026–27	League One	0	0	0	0	0	0	0	0	0	0
Career total			88	0	5	0	2	0	5	0	100	0

== Honours ==
England U21

- UEFA European Under-21 Championship: 2025
