= 2024–25 EFL League Two =

21st season of EFL League Two

EFL League Two
- Season: 2024–25
- Dates: 9 August 2024 – 3 May 2025
- Champions: Doncaster Rovers; 1st League Two title 4th fourth tier title
- Promoted: Doncaster Rovers; Port Vale; Bradford City; AFC Wimbledon
- Relegated: Carlisle United; Morecambe
- Top goalscorer: Michael Cheek (23 goals)
- Highest attendance: 24,033 (Bradford vs Fleetwood)
- Total attendance: 3,361,795
- Average attendance: 6,090

The 2024–25 EFL League Two (referred to as the Sky Bet League Two for sponsorship purposes) was the 21st season of the EFL League Two under its current title and the 33rd season under its current league division format. The season commenced on 9 August 2024.

The 2024–25 season consisted of 36 weekend rounds, six midweek rounds, and four bank holiday matchweeks.

== Team changes ==
The following teams have changed division since the 2023–24 season:

=== To League Two ===
Promoted from the National League

- Chesterfield
- Bromley

Relegated from League One

- Cheltenham Town
- Fleetwood Town
- Port Vale
- Carlisle United

=== From League Two ===
Promoted to League One

- Stockport County
- Wrexham
- Mansfield Town
- Crawley Town

Relegated to the National League

- Forest Green Rovers
- Sutton United

== Stadiums and locations ==
Locations of the 2024–25 EFL League Two teams
Locations of the 2024–25 EFL League Two North West area teams

Note: Table lists in alphabetical order.

Team	Location	Stadium	Capacity
Accrington Stanley	Accrington	Crown Ground	5,450
AFC Wimbledon	London (Wimbledon)	Plough Lane	9,369
Barrow	Barrow-in-Furness	Holker Street	6,500
Bradford City	Bradford	Valley Parade	24,840
Bromley	London (Bromley)	Hayes Lane	5,150
Carlisle United	Carlisle	Brunton Park	17,949
Cheltenham Town	Cheltenham	Whaddon Road	7,066
Chesterfield	Chesterfield	SMH Group Stadium	10,504
Colchester United	Colchester	Colchester Community Stadium	10,105
Crewe Alexandra	Crewe	Gresty Road	10,153
Doncaster Rovers	Doncaster	Eco-Power Stadium	15,231
Fleetwood Town	Fleetwood	Highbury Stadium	5,327
Gillingham	Gillingham	Priestfield Stadium	11,582
Grimsby Town	Cleethorpes	Blundell Park	9,052
Harrogate Town	Harrogate	Wetherby Road	5,000
Milton Keynes Dons	Milton Keynes (Denbigh)	Stadium MK	30,500
Morecambe	Morecambe	Mazuma Mobile Stadium	6,476
Newport County	Newport	Rodney Parade	7,850
Notts County	Nottingham	Meadow Lane	19,841
Port Vale	Stoke-on-Trent (Burslem)	Vale Park	15,036
Salford City	Salford (Kersal)	Moor Lane	5,108
Swindon Town	Swindon	County Ground	15,728
Tranmere Rovers	Birkenhead (Prenton)	Prenton Park	16,789
Walsall	Walsall (Bescot)	Bescot Stadium	11,300

== Personnel and sponsoring ==
Team	Manager	Captain	Kit manufacturer	Shirt sponsor (front)	Shirt sponsor (back)	Shirt sponsor (sleeve)	Shorts sponsor
Accrington Stanley	(England) John Doolan	(Republic of Ireland) Séamus Conneely	(Italy) Macron	Wham Housewares	Sundown Technology	None	Fagan & Whalley
AFC Wimbledon	(England) Johnnie Jackson	(England) Jake Reeves	(England) Umbro	War Child	Togglit	None	DFTBA
Barrow	(England) Andy Whing	(Republic of Ireland) Niall Canavan	(Germany) Puma	Newfoundland and Labrador	Cumbria Roofing Ulverston	Keyin College	DSG Limited
Bradford City	(Scotland) Graham Alexander	(England) Richie Smallwood	(Italy) Macron	JCT600	University of Bradford	Flamingo Land/Penny Appeal (in league cup matches)	Regal Foods
Bromley	(England) Andy Woodman	(England) Byron Webster	(Italy) Macron	LSP Renewables	Blue Security Systems	Brownhill Insurance Group	Bromley Signs
Carlisle United	(Wales) Mark Hughes	(England) Charlie Wyke	(England) Umbro	Aqua Pura	Story Homes	Komatsu	Carlisle Brass
Cheltenham Town	(Wales) Michael Flynn	(England) Harry Pell	(Italy) Erreà	Mira Showers	Marchants	Smarta Water-Smarta Energy	CGT Lettings
Chesterfield	(England) Paul Cook	(England) Jamie Grimes	(Germany) Puma	Leengate Valves	None	Leengate Valves	Ideal Flooring
Colchester United	(England) Danny Cowley	(Northern Ireland) Tom Flanagan	(Italy) Macron	HotLizard	Coffey Brooks Financial Services	Peach Guitars	Bidfood
Crewe Alexandra	(England) Lee Bell	(England) Mickey Demetriou	(Thailand) FBT	Mornflake (Home and Away) St Luke's Hospice (Third)	Zzoomm	Enviro Skip Hire	CAN Solutions
Doncaster Rovers	(Northern Ireland) Grant McCann	(England) Richard Wood	(England) Oxen	Eco-Power Group	Stoneacre Motor Group	MF Hire	IPM Group
Fleetwood Town	(England) Pete Wild	(England) Brendan Wiredu	(Germany) Puma	Ruby Energy (H & A)/BES Utilities (T)	onCORE Foodservice Solutions	Lancashire Bird Control	None
Gillingham	(England) Gareth Ainsworth	(Germany) Max Ehmer	(Italy) Macron	Bauvill	PISO	Magnus Search Recruitment	GR.IT Consultancy
Grimsby Town	(Gibraltar) David Artell	(England) Danny Rose	(England) Umbro	myenergi	myenergi	Blackrow Group	myenergi
Harrogate Town	(England) Simon Weaver	(England) Josh Falkingham	(United States) New Balance	EnviroVent	Oak By Design	Annapurna Recruitment	None
Milton Keynes Dons	(England) Paul Warne	(England) Dean Lewington	(England) Castore	Suzuki	eEnergy	Stadium Support Services Ltd	Stadium Support Services Ltd
Morecambe	(Scotland) Derek Adams	(Cameroon) Yann Songo'o	(England) Terrace	The Fan Cave Memorabilia	Halo Aerospace Laboratories UK (H)/Aqua Engineering (A)	Right Floor Services	The Career Wallet
Newport County	(Wales) Dafydd Williams (caretaker)	(England) Aaron Wildig & (England) James Clarke (joint)	(England) VX3 Sportswear	Pure Vans (H)/Alfa Staff (A)	57 Tyres Newport (H)	Best Blinds 431117 (H)/Newport Galvanizers (A)	Candour Talent (H)/Bar Piazza Newport (A)
Notts County	(England) Stuart Maynard	(England) Matthew Palmer	(Germany) Puma	John Pye Auctions (H)/University of Nottingham (A)	John Pye Auctions (H)/Swan Homes (A)	WorkBox UK	None
Port Vale	(Jamaica) Darren Moore	(England) Ben Garrity	(Germany) Puma	Synectics Solutions	Staffordshire University	IronMarket Wealth	Global QA
Salford City	(England) Karl Robinson	(Jamaica) Curtis Tilt	(Germany) Adidas	Fireball Cinnamon Whisky	Quality Care Group	Salford Van & Car Hire	Champions Travel
Swindon Town	(England) Ian Holloway	(England) Ollie Clarke	(Germany) Adidas	MiPermit	FirstCity Care Group (H)/Cellular Fitness (A)	Veezu (H)/Barnes Coaches(A)	Platinum Security Services (H)/Cotswold Farm Machinery (A)
Tranmere Rovers	(England) Andy Crosby (interim)	(England) Tom Davies	(Indonesia) Mills	Essar	Searchability	O'Rourke Construction	None
Walsall	(England) Mat Sadler	(Montserrat) Donervon Daniels	(Italy) Macron	Poundland	Poundland	Howard Evans Roofing and Cladding	RayGray Snacks

== Managerial changes ==
Team	Outgoing manager	Manner of departure	Date of vacancy	Position in the table	Incoming manager	Date of appointment
Swindon Town	(Republic of Ireland) Gavin Gunning	End of interim spell	27 April 2024	Pre-season	(Republic of Ireland) Mark Kennedy	29 May 2024
Gillingham	(England) Stephen Clemence	Sacked	29 April 2024	Pre-season	(England) Mark Bonner	7 May 2024
Morecambe	(England) Ged Brannan	Signed by Accrington Stanley	30 April 2024	Pre-season	(Scotland) Derek Adams	3 June 2024
Cheltenham Town	(England) Darrell Clarke	Signed by Barnsley	23 May 2024	Pre-season	(Wales) Michael Flynn	5 June 2024
Barrow	(England) Pete Wild	Mutual consent	24 May 2024	Pre-season	(England) Stephen Clemence	31 May 2024
Newport County	(Republic of Ireland) Graham Coughlan	Mutual consent	20 June 2024	Pre-season	(Portugal) Nelson Jardim	16 July 2024
Carlisle United	(England) Paul Simpson	Sacked	31 August 2024	20th	(England) Mike Williamson	19 September 2024
Milton Keynes Dons	(England) Mike Williamson	Signed by Carlisle United	19 September 2024	20th	(England) Scott Lindsey	25 September 2024
Swindon Town	(Republic of Ireland) Mark Kennedy	Sacked	25 October 2024	22nd	(England) Ian Holloway	25 October 2024
Fleetwood Town	(Scotland) Charlie Adam	Sacked	22 December 2024	18th	(England) Pete Wild	24 December 2024
Gillingham	(England) Mark Bonner	Sacked	5 January 2025	14th	(England) John Coleman	5 January 2025
Barrow	(England) Stephen Clemence	Sacked	18 January 2025	17th	(England) Andy Whing	20 January 2025
Carlisle United	(England) Mike Williamson	Sacked	3 February 2025	24th	(Wales) Mark Hughes	6 February 2025
Tranmere Rovers	(England) Nigel Adkins	Mutual agreement	26 February 2025	22nd	(England) Andy Crosby (Note: Crosby was initially appointed as interim manager before being appointed permanently on 14 May 2025.)	26 February 2025
Milton Keynes Dons	(England) Scott Lindsey	Sacked	2 March 2025	17th	(England) Ben Gladwin (interim)	2 March 2025
Gillingham	(England) John Coleman	Sacked	25 March 2025	19th	(England) Gareth Ainsworth	25 March 2025
Milton Keynes Dons	(England) Ben Gladwin	End of interim spell	15 April 2025	19th	(England) Paul Warne	15 April 2025
Newport County	(Portugal) Nelson Jardim	Mutual consent	24 April 2025	21st	(Wales) Dafydd Williams (interim)	25 April 2025

== League table ==
Pos	Team	Pld	W	D	L	GF	GA	GD	Pts	Promotion, qualification or relegation
1	Doncaster Rovers (C, P)	46	24	12	10	73	50	+23	84	Promotion to EFL League One
2	Port Vale (P)	46	22	14	10	65	46	+19	80	Promotion to EFL League One
3	Bradford City (P)	46	22	12	12	64	45	+19	78	Promotion to EFL League One
4	Walsall	46	21	14	11	75	54	+21	77	Qualification for League Two play-offs
5	AFC Wimbledon (O, P)	46	20	13	13	56	35	+21	73	Qualification for League Two play-offs
6	Notts County	46	20	12	14	68	49	+19	72	Qualification for League Two play-offs
7	Chesterfield	46	19	13	14	73	54	+19	70	Qualification for League Two play-offs
8	Salford City	46	18	15	13	64	54	+10	69	
9	Grimsby Town	46	20	8	18	61	67	−6	68	
10	Colchester United	46	16	19	11	52	47	+5	67	
11	Bromley	46	17	15	14	64	59	+5	66	
12	Swindon Town	46	15	17	14	71	63	+8	62	
13	Crewe Alexandra	46	15	17	14	49	48	+1	62	
14	Fleetwood Town	46	15	15	16	60	60	0	60	
15	Cheltenham Town	46	16	12	18	60	70	−10	60	
16	Barrow	46	15	14	17	52	50	+2	59	
17	Gillingham	46	14	16	16	41	46	−5	58	
18	Harrogate Town	46	14	11	21	43	61	−18	53	
19	Milton Keynes Dons	46	14	10	22	52	66	−14	52	
20	Tranmere Rovers	46	12	15	19	45	65	−20	51	
21	Accrington Stanley	46	12	14	20	53	69	−16	50	
22	Newport County	46	13	10	23	52	76	−24	49	
23	Carlisle United (R)	46	10	12	24	44	71	−27	42	Relegation to National League
24	Morecambe (R)	46	10	6	30	40	72	−32	36	Relegation to National League

Source: EFL Official Website
Rules for classification: 1) Points; 2) Goal difference; 3) Number of goals scored; 4) Head-to-head results; 5) Wins; 6) Away goals; 7) Penalty points (sec 9.5); 8) 12-point sending off offences
(C) Champions; (O) Play-off winners; (P) Promoted; (R) Relegated

== Results ==
Home \ Away	ACC	WIM	BAR	BRA	BRM	CAR	CHT	CHF	COL	CRE	DON	FLE	GIL	GRI	HAR	MIL	MOR	NEW	NCO	POV	SAL	SWI	TRA	WAL
Accrington Stanley	—	0–0	1–0	0–0	1–2	1–1	0–0	0–1	1–1	0–1	1–2	1–4	1–1	3–2	3–3	2–0	2–1	5–0	0–3	2–2	0–2	2–2	3–3	0–0
AFC Wimbledon	2–2	—	2–2	1–0	0–1	4–0	1–2	0–0	4–2	3–0	1–0	1–0	1–0	0–1	1–0	3–0	3–0	2–2	2–0	0–2	1–0	1–1	2–0	0–1
Barrow	2–0	1–3	—	2–2	3–3	0–1	2–1	0–1	1–1	1–0	1–3	2–0	3–0	3–0	0–2	2–1	0–1	2–0	1–1	4–0	1–1	1–1	0–0	2–0
Bradford City	1–0	0–0	1–1	—	3–1	2–1	3–0	2–1	4–1	2–0	1–2	1–0	2–1	3–1	1–0	2–0	1–0	3–1	1–1	2–1	0–0	1–0	0–1	3–0
Bromley	4–0	2–0	1–1	0–1	—	1–1	3–0	2–2	0–1	1–2	1–0	1–0	2–1	0–2	2–0	1–1	1–0	5–2	2–4	0–0	2–3	1–1	1–2	2–2
Carlisle United	2–1	1–2	1–0	0–1	2–1	—	0–1	0–2	0–0	1–1	0–0	2–3	0–0	2–3	1–1	2–2	0–1	3–2	0–2	3–2	2–2	1–5	1–2	1–1
Cheltenham Town	2–1	0–1	3–2	1–1	1–1	3–2	—	1–0	0–1	2–1	0–2	0–2	1–1	1–1	1–0	0–1	2–0	3–2	3–5	1–1	2–1	2–3	1–0	2–2
Chesterfield	0–3	1–0	1–0	3–3	3–0	2–1	1–1	—	1–1	1–3	5–2	3–0	1–1	2–1	0–0	1–2	4–1	2–1	2–2	1–1	1–1	1–1	3–0	2–2
Colchester United	0–2	1–1	0–0	1–1	1–1	0–0	1–2	1–0	—	0–0	1–1	3–0	2–0	1–2	0–1	2–0	1–0	0–0	1–0	2–1	1–2	4–0	3–0	2–1
Crewe Alexandra	0–1	1–1	3–0	1–1	4–1	3–2	2–3	0–5	0–0	—	1–1	1–4	2–0	2–0	3–0	0–1	1–0	0–3	2–0	0–1	1–1	0–0	3–1	0–1
Doncaster Rovers	4–1	1–1	1–0	2–1	0–1	3–0	2–2	0–3	3–0	1–1	—	2–1	1–0	1–2	1–0	2–1	1–0	3–0	1–1	1–2	1–1	2–2	3–1	2–2
Fleetwood Town	1–1	0–0	0–0	1–0	0–0	1–2	2–0	2–0	0–0	0–1	2–4	—	0–0	1–0	1–1	2–1	2–2	2–0	2–2	1–1	2–2	0–4	0–0	2–0
Gillingham	1–2	1–0	2–0	1–0	0–3	4–1	2–2	1–0	1–1	0–0	0–1	1–2	—	0–1	1–2	1–0	1–0	0–2	1–2	1–0	1–0	1–1	3–0	0–0
Grimsby Town	5–2	0–1	1–2	2–1	1–0	2–1	3–2	1–1	0–1	0–2	0–3	2–1	1–1	—	2–1	1–3	3–1	1–0	0–2	3–0	0–1	0–4	1–1	1–4
Harrogate Town	2–1	0–3	0–1	2–1	0–2	1–0	2–0	2–1	0–0	1–1	2–0	3–1	1–1	2–2	—	1–5	1–2	1–0	1–3	0–1	0–2	1–0	3–2	0–2
Milton Keynes Dons	2–1	0–0	0–3	1–2	0–1	3–0	3–2	3–0	0–1	1–1	1–1	2–4	0–1	0–0	2–1	—	2–1	0–0	0–2	0–1	0–1	3–1	1–1	1–0
Morecambe	2–0	1–0	2–2	1–1	0–2	0–2	2–0	2–5	3–3	0–1	0–1	4–2	0–1	0–3	1–2	1–3	—	0–1	1–1	0–1	1–3	1–0	2–0	0–2
Newport County	3–1	1–2	1–0	0–0	1–1	1–0	0–3	0–3	0–2	2–1	3–1	0–0	3–1	0–0	3–0	6–3	2–1	—	0–2	1–4	3–1	1–2	1–4	0–0
Notts County	2–0	1–0	1–2	3–0	1–1	1–0	1–2	1–2	1–1	0–0	1–2	2–2	0–1	4–1	1–0	3–0	2–0	0–0	—	0–1	1–3	2–0	2–1	1–2
Port Vale	2–1	3–2	0–1	2–0	5–0	0–0	0–0	1–0	1–1	1–1	2–3	3–1	0–1	2–2	0–0	3–0	1–0	3–2	1–0	—	2–1	2–1	0–0	0–1
Salford City	1–2	1–0	3–0	1–2	3–3	0–1	2–1	0–4	4–1	1–1	1–1	0–2	2–2	1–2	2–0	1–0	1–0	1–1	3–0	0–2	—	2–1	2–0	0–2
Swindon Town	0–0	2–1	2–0	5–4	0–1	0–2	3–3	1–0	3–2	0–0	1–2	3–1	1–1	3–1	0–0	0–0	2–3	4–0	1–2	3–3	2–2	—	3–1	0–4
Tranmere Rovers	0–1	0–2	1–1	0–2	2–1	1–0	2–0	4–0	1–3	2–0	0–3	0–0	1–1	0–1	2–1	1–1	2–2	2–1	0–0	1–1	0–0	1–1	—	1–0
Walsall	0–1	1–1	1–0	2–1	2–2	3–1	2–1	3–1	4–0	1–1	2–0	2–6	1–1	1–3	2–2	4–2	1–0	2–0	3–2	2–3	2–2	0–1	5–1	—

Legend: Blue = home team win; Yellow = draw; Red = away team win.
For upcoming matches, an "a" indicates there is an article about the rivalry between the two participants.

== Play-offs ==
=== Bracket ===
Semi-finals
7	Chesterfield	0	1	1
4	Walsall	2	2	4
6	Notts County	0	0	0
5	AFC Wimbledon	1	1	2

Final
4	Walsall	0
5	AFC Wimbledon	1

=== Semi-finals ===
First leg

10 May 2025
20:00 BST

Notts County	0–1	AFC Wimbledon
	Report	Harbottle 59'

Meadow Lane, Nottingham
Attendance: 12,385
Referee: Thomas Kirk
11 May 2025
15:30 BST

Chesterfield	0–2	Walsall
	Report	Allen 28' (pen.); Chang 39'

SMH Group Stadium, Chesterfield
Attendance: 10,001
Referee: Martin Coy

Second leg

16 May 2025
20:00 BST

Walsall	2–1	Chesterfield
Lakin 81'; Amantchi 90+5'	Report	Dobra 90+4'

Bescot Stadium, Walsall
Attendance: 9,585
Referee: Ben Toner

Walsall won 4–1 on aggregate.

17 May 2025
12:30 BST

AFC Wimbledon	1–0	Notts County
Neufville 8'	Report

Plough Lane, Wimbledon
Attendance: 8,501
Referee: Lewis Smith

AFC Wimbledon won 2–0 on aggregate.

=== Final ===
26 May 2025
15:01 BST

AFC Wimbledon	1–0	Walsall
Hippolyte 45+2'	Report

Wembley Stadium, London
Attendance: 50,947
Referee: Will Finnie

== Season statistics ==
As of 3 May 2025

=== Top scorers ===
Rank	Player	Club	Goals
1	(England) Michael Cheek	Bromley	25
2	(The Gambia) Alassana Jatta	Notts County	19
3	(Republic of Ireland) David McGoldrick	Notts County	17
3	(England) Matty Stevens	AFC Wimbledon	17
5	(England) Luke Molyneux	Doncaster Rovers	16
6	(England) Nathan Lowe	Walsall	15
6	(England) Harry Smith	Swindon Town	15
6	(England) Cole Stockton	Salford City	15
9	(England) Danny Rose	Grimsby Town	14
9	(Switzerland) Lorent Tolaj	Port Vale	14

=== Hat-tricks ===
Player	For	Against	Result	Date	Ref
(England) Matty Stevens	AFC Wimbledon	Carlisle United	4–0 (H)	12 October 2024	
(England) Harry Smith	Swindon Town	Fleetwood Town	3–1 (H)	7 December 2024	
(England) Bryn Morris	Newport County	Milton Keynes Dons	6–3 (H)	21 December 2024	
(Cameroon) Bobby Kamwa	Newport County	Milton Keynes Dons	6–3 (H)	21 December 2024	
(England) Luke Molyneux	Doncaster Rovers	Tranmere Rovers	0–3 (A)	18 April 2025	

== Awards ==
=== Monthly ===
Each month the EFL announces their official Player of the Month and Manager of the Month.

Month	Manager of the Month		Player of the Month		Reference
August	(England) Mark Bonner	Gillingham	(England) Luke Molyneux	Doncaster Rovers	
September	(Jamaica) Darren Moore	Port Vale	(England) Glenn Morris	Gillingham	
October	(Jamaica) Darren Moore	Port Vale	(Northern Ireland) Will Grigg	Chesterfield	
November	(Scotland) Derek Adams	Morecambe	(England) Alex Gilbey	Milton Keynes Dons	
December	(England) Mat Sadler	Walsall	(England) Nathan Lowe	Walsall	
January	(England) Ian Holloway	Swindon Town	(England) Shaun Whalley	Accrington Stanley	
February	(Scotland) Graham Alexander	Bradford City	(England) Antoni Sarcevic	Bradford City	
March	(England) Danny Cowley	Colchester United	(England) George Lapslie	Bradford City	
April	(Northern Ireland) Grant McCann	Doncaster Rovers	(Switzerland) Lorent Tolaj	Port Vale	

=== Annual ===
Award	Winner	Club
Player of the Season	(England) Michael Cheek	Bromley
Young Player of the Season	(England) Nathan Lowe	Walsall
Apprentice of the Season	(England) Jack Shorrock	Port Vale

League Two Team of the Season

Pos.	Player	Club	Ref.
GK	(England) Owen Goodman	AFC Wimbledon	
RB	(England) Connor Barrett	Walsall	
CB	(England) Taylor Allen	Walsall	
CB	(England) Connor Hall	Port Vale	
LB	(England) Denver Hume	Grimsby Town	
RM	(England) Luke Molyneux	Doncaster Rovers	
CM	(England) Richie Smallwood	Bradford City	
LM	(England) Jack Payne	Colchester United	
AM	(Republic of Ireland) David McGoldrick	Notts County	
ST	(The Gambia) Alassana Jatta	Notts County	
ST	(England) Michael Cheek	Bromley	
Manager	(Scotland) Graham Alexander	Bradford City	

== Attendances ==
#	Football club	Average attendance
1	Bradford City	17,762
2	Notts County	9,811
3	Chesterfield	8,222
4	Doncaster Rovers	8,014
5	AFC Wimbledon	8,008
6	Port Vale	7,608
7	Carlisle United	7,425
8	Swindon Town	7,275
9	Milton Keynes Dons	7,025
10	Tranmere Rovers	6,329
11	Walsall	6,319
12	Gillingham	6,268
13	Grimsby Town	6,067
14	Crewe Alexandra	5,397
15	Colchester United	4,998
16	Newport County	4,203
17	Cheltenham Town	4,198
18	Morecambe	3,571
19	Barrow	3,381
20	Fleetwood Town	3,131
21	Bromley	3,092
22	Harrogate Town	2,948
23	Salford City	2,849
24	Accrington Stanley	2,539
