= David Okagbue =

Irish footballer (born 2004)

Personal information
- Full name: David Chukwudubem Okagbue
- Date of birth: 4 February 2004 (age 22)
- Place of birth: Dublin, Ireland
- Height: 1.90 m (6 ft 3 in)
- Position: Centre-back

Team information
- Current team: Peterborough United
- Number: 26

Youth career
- St. Mochta's
- –2020: St. Kevin's Boys
- 2020–2022: Stoke City

Senior career*
Years	Team	Apps	(Gls)
2022–2024	Stoke City	0	(0)
2022	→ Chester (loan)	1	(0)
2022–2023	→ Oldham Athletic (loan)	9	(1)
2023–2024	→ Walsall (loan)	30	(1)
2024–2025	Walsall	44	(2)
2025–	Peterborough United	31	(0)

International career^{‡}
2021–2022	Republic of Ireland U19	3	(0)
2024–2026	Republic of Ireland U21	10	(0)
- * Club domestic league appearances and goals as of 18:53, 15 August 2026 (UTC) ‡ National team caps and goals as of 00:09, 18 November 2026 (UTC)

David Chukwudubem Okagbue (born 4 February 2004) is an Irish professional footballer who plays as a centre-back for League One club Peterborough United. He is a Republic of Ireland youth international.

== Career ==
=== Stoke City ===
Okagbue came over to Stoke City from Dublin in 2020. He had played for then Bohemians affiliate St. Kevin's Boys. Previous to that he had started his football life at Clonsilla Club, St. Mochta's FC for several years. He spent time on loan with Chester from February 2022. In September 2022, he joined Oldham Athletic of the National League on loan. On 1 September 2023, he joined Walsall of EFL League Two on a season-long loan. Okabgue made 35 appearances and scored 1 goal in a 2–1 win over Accrington Stanley in 2023–24 as the Saddlers finished in 11th position. He was offered a new contract in May 2024.

=== Walsall ===
Okagbue joined Walsall on a permanent deal on 4 July 2024 after the club reach agreement on compensation with Stoke City. He signed a two-year contract. He scored his first league goal as a permanent member of the Walsall squad when he bundled home a late equaliser to earn his club a 2–2 draw against Bromley on 26 November 2024. Walsall would finish the season in 4th entering the play-offs, Okagbue started in the final at Wembley Stadium where his team would lose 0–1 to AFC Wimbledon.

=== Peterborough United ===
On 21 July 2025, Okagbue signed for EFL League One side Peterborough United for an undisclosed fee on a four-year deal with an option for a fifth.

== International career ==
A former Republic of Ireland U19 international, he made his debut for the side on 10 November 2021, against Montenegro U19. In November 2024, he received his first call up to the Republic of Ireland U21 squad for their two friendlies against Sweden U21 in Marbella, Spain. Okagbue made his Ireland under-21 debut in the subsequent 3–2 win over Sweden U21 in Marbella.

== Career statistics ==
As of match played 26 May 2025

Appearances and goals by club, season and competition
Club	Season	League			FA Cup		League Cup		Other		Total	
Club	Season	Division	Apps	Goals	Apps	Goals	Apps	Goals	Apps	Goals	Apps	Goals
Stoke City	2022–23	Championship	0	0	0	0	0	0	—		0	0
Stoke City	2023–24	Championship	0	0	0	0	0	0	—		0	0
Stoke City	Total		0	0	0	0	0	0	—		0	0
Chester (loan)	2022–23	National League North	1	0	0	0	—		0	0	1	0
Oldham Athletic (loan)	2023–24	National League	9	1	3	0	—		0	0	12	1
Walsall (loan)	2023–24	League Two	30	1	4	0	0	0	1 (Note: Appearance(s) in EFL Trophy)	0	35	1
Walsall	2024–25	League Two	44	2	1	0	3	0	6 (Note: Three appearances in EFL Trophy and three appearances in EFL League Two play-offs)	0	54	2
Walsall	Total		74	3	5	0	3	0	7	0	89	3
Career total			84	4	8	0	3	0	7	0	102	4
