= Liam Gordon (footballer, born 1999) =

Guyanese footballer

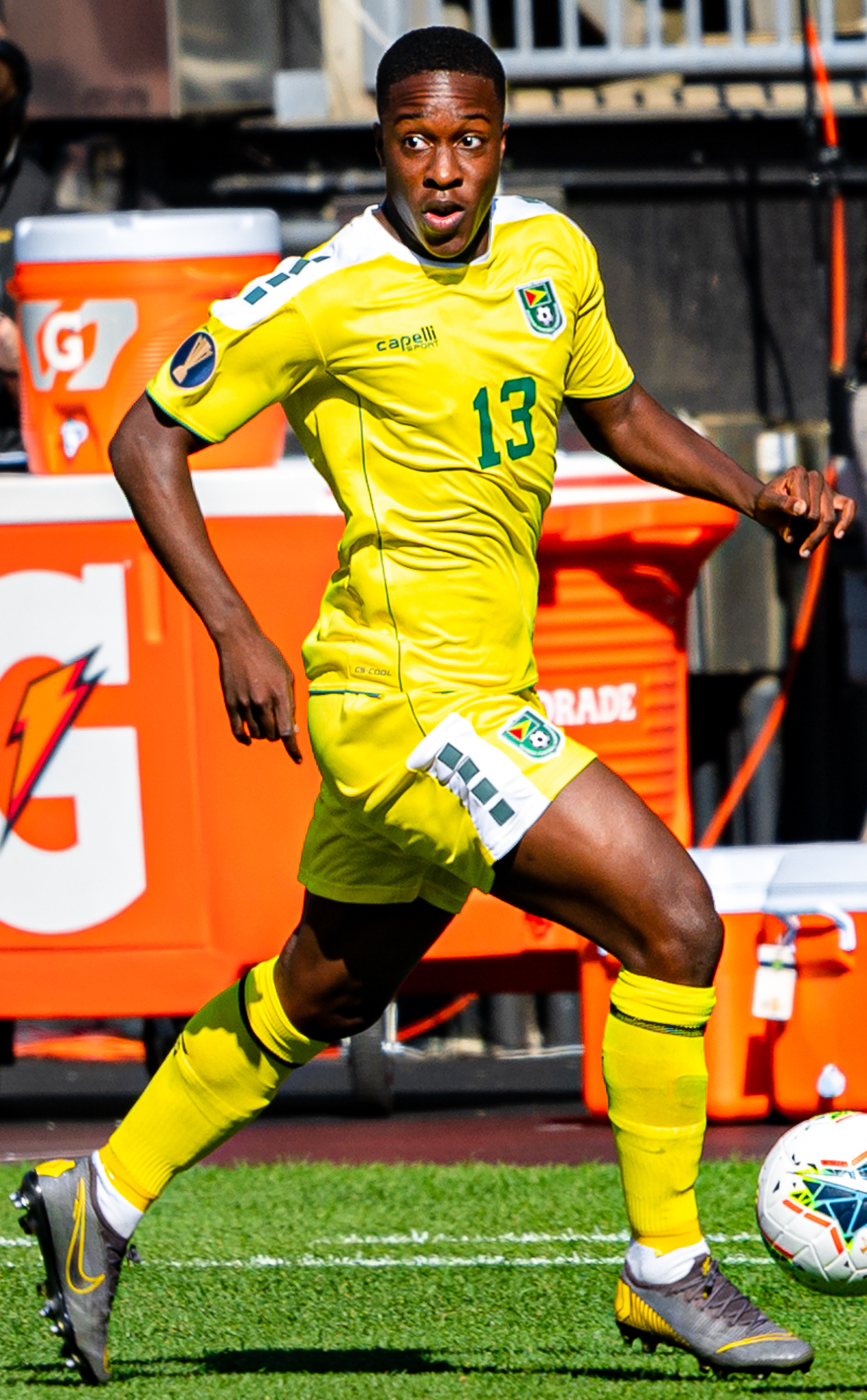
- Gordon at the 2019 CONCACAF Gold Cup with Guyana

Personal information
- Full name: Liam Spencer Gordon
- Date of birth: 15 May 1999 (age 27)
- Place of birth: Croydon, England
- Height: 1.83 m (6 ft 0 in)
- Position: Left-back

Team information
- Current team: Port Vale
- Number: 15

Youth career
- 2008–2012: Fulham
- 2012–2014: AFC Wimbledon
- 2014–2016: Carshalton Athletic

Senior career*
| Years | Team | Apps | (Gls) |
| 2016 | Carshalton Athletic | | |
| 2016–2020 | Dagenham & Redbridge | 50 | (3) |
| 2017 | → Whitehawk (loan) | 17 | (2) |
| 2018 | → Hendon (loan) | 3 | (0) |
| 2019–2020 | → Dartford (loan) | 10 | (0) |
| 2020–2022 | Bolton Wanderers | 23 | (0) |
| 2020–2021 | → Dagenham & Redbridge (loan) | 23 | (4) |
| 2022–2025 | Walsall | 118 | (6) |
| 2025– | Port Vale | 31 | (0) |

International career^{‡}
| 2019– | Guyana | 33 | (3) |
- * Club domestic league appearances and goals as of 14:32, 5 September 2026 (UTC) ‡ National team caps and goals as of 14:51, 20 November 2026 (UTC)

Liam Spencer Gordon (born 15 May 1999) is a professional footballer who plays as a left-back for EFL League Two club Port Vale. Born in England, he plays for the Guyana national team, for whom he competed at the 2019 CONCACAF Gold Cup.

Gordon spent time in the youth systems at Fulham and AFC Wimbledon, before making his senior debut in the Isthmian League at Carshalton Athletic in January 2016. He joined Dagenham & Redbridge later that year and played 50 National League games for the club. He also spent time on loan at Whitehawk, Hendon and Dartford. He left Dagenham to sign for Bolton Wanderers in August 2020, helping the team to win promotion out of League Two at the end of the 2020–21 campaign, which he ended back on loan at Dagenham & Redbridge. He was let go by Bolton and joined Walsall in May 2022, playing on the losing side of the 2025 League Two play-off final. He left Walsall for Port Vale in June 2025.

== Club career ==
=== Non-League ===
Liam Spencer Gordon was born on 15 May 1999 in the London Borough of Croydon. He spent four years in the Academy at Fulham up to under-12 level, before spending two years with AFC Wimbledon until the club scrapped their academy program. Around this time he transition from a left-sided midfielder into a left-back. He played for the Carshalton Athletic first-team in January 2016 as a 16-year-old due to an injury crisis, but conceded a penalty and was sent off for a second booking in a 7–1 defeat to Ramsgate in the Isthmian League Division One South. Manager Matt Howard was sacked after the match.

He joined Dagenham & Redbridge of the National League and made his debut at Victoria Road in an Essex Senior Cup win over Southend United on 11 October 2016. He played one further game in the competition during the 2016–17 campaign. He started the 2017–18 season on loan at National League South side Whitehawk and remained there for three months until November. He scored two goals in 17 games for the Hawks. In January 2018, he went on a one-month loan to Isthmian League Premier Division side Hendon, along with Joe White. He was praised by manager Gary McCann despite the team losing both of his first two appearances for the Greens. He made his league debut for Dagenham under John Still on 19 April 2018, scoring the second goal in a 5–3 victory away at Guiseley.

In February 2019, he signed a new one-year contract with the option of a further year after an impressive first half of the season as manager Peter Taylor felt he had "a very bright future". He featured 38 times throughout the 2018–19 campaign, scoring two goals. Gordon joined National League South club Dartford on loan after falling down the pecking order at Dagenham during the 2019–20 campaign, finding that Dartford manager Steve King – who had managed him at Whitehawk – gave him "a massive confidence boost". The initial one-month loan began on 2 November and was extended into a second month. He was recalled to Dagenham on 2 January after ten appearances for the Darts. He left Dagenham & Redbridge after rejecting the club's offer of a new contract.

=== Bolton Wanderers ===
On 1 August 2020, Gordon signed a two-year deal with recently relegated League Two club Bolton Wanderers. He was one of Ian Evatt's first signings as manager. His debut at the University of Bolton Stadium came on 5 September, a 2–1 defeat to Bradford City in the first round of the EFL Cup. He began as the Trotters starting left-back and played 15 games in the first part of the 2020–21 campaign, though he lost confidence, however, as he struggled to adapt to playing in the English Football League (EFL). On 17 December, he was loaned back to Dagenham & Redbridge for a month. Dagenham manager Daryl McMahon stated that "we fought hard to keep him and kept in touch while he was at Bolton". However, league postponements meant that Gordon was only able to feature in one FA Trophy match during the initial loan period. On 19 January, the loan was extended to the end of the 2020–21 season. He scored four goals in 25 games for the Daggers, mostly playing on the left-side of midfield, greatly impressing Evatt back at Bolton.

Bolton had gained promotion to League One during his absence. He served as Declan John's stand in during the 2021–22 campaign, learning from John's superior attacking play. He also filled in at right-back during an injury crisis in November, saying he felt comfortable there in a 3–0 victory over Doncaster Rovers. On 3 May 2022, Bolton confirmed that he would be released at the end of his contract. Gordon later admitted that he "wasn't good enough" or ready enough as a 21-year-old for the challenge of breaking into the EFL playing for a "massive" club far away from home during the COVID-19 pandemic, but that the experience helped to "shape me into the person and player I am today [in 2025]".

=== Walsall ===
On 25 May 2022, Gordon agreed to join League Two club Walsall on a free transfer, with his two-year deal starting on 1 July. However, during his first pre-season with the club, he was diagnosed with acute compartment syndrome, which forced him to undergo three operations in five days, which could have resulted in his leg being amputated. He was able to overcome the condition and return to play, despite suffering chronic shin inflammation. He returned to full fitness in September, with manager Michael Flynn commenting that his strength and resilience was "resonating" with the squad as they attempted to overcome a bad patch of form. Gordon scored his first goal for the Saddlers on his second league start for the club, in a 3–1 victory over Harrogate Town. He featured 36 times throughout the 2022–23 campaign. Speaking in November 2023, he said he was "loving" his time at the club despite the team's indifferent form. In January 2024, Gordon signed an 18-month contract with the club. He went on to make 49 appearances in the 2023–24 season, scoring two goals.

On 2 November 2024, he scored the winning goal against his former club Bolton Wanderers in a 2–1 FA Cup victory at the Bescot Stadium. Gordon told the press the following month that Walsall boss Mat Sadler was the best manager he had worked with. Walsall were 12 points clear at the top of the table at one stage of the 2024–25 campaign, but ended up in the play-offs after a 13-game winless run cost them automatic promotion. Walsall reached the play-off final, losing to his former club AFC Wimbledon at Wembley Stadium, after which he said he needed "to pull myself together and go again". He then left the club after rejecting the offer of a new contract.

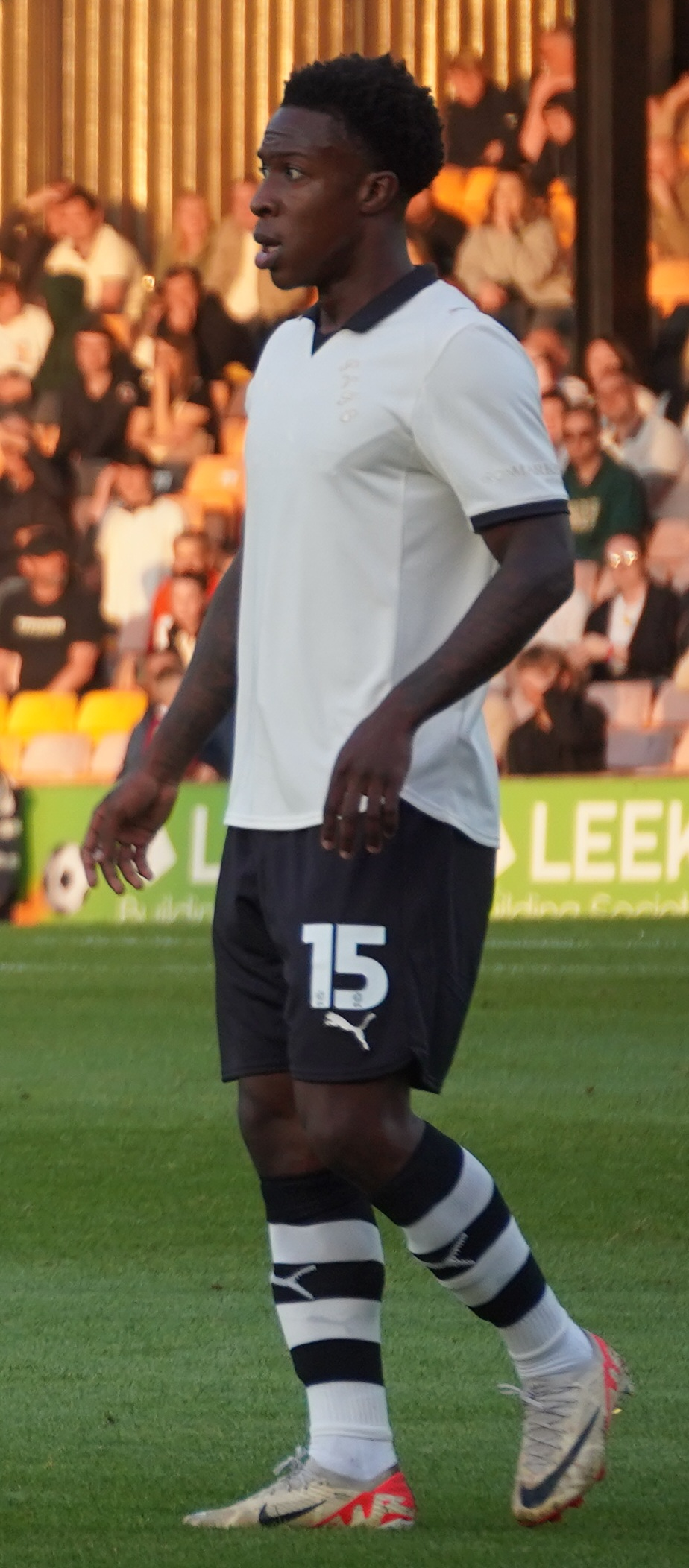
Gordon as a Port Vale player, August 2025

=== Port Vale ===
On 12 June 2025, Gordon signed a two-year contract with newly promoted League One club Port Vale. He was sidelined with a hamstring injury in September. He showed his best form for the club in March. He missed four months of the 2025–26 relegation season; played well at left-wing back under new manager Jon Brady, though his form did dip towards the end of the campaign.

He lost his first-team place in September 2026 and then was injured on international duty the following month.

== International career ==
Gordon made his debut for the Guyana national team on 6 June 2019 as a starter in a friendly against Bermuda. He was then selected for the country's 2019 CONCACAF Gold Cup final 23-man squad after it was whittled down from 40 players. He was recalled to the national team in March 2023 and scored on his first match back against Bermuda. He captained the team for the first time in a loss to Suriname in the CONCACAF Nations League on 16 October 2024.

== Style of play ==
Gordon can play left-back or left-wing back. He has good athleticism and crossing ability.

== Career statistics ==
=== Club ===
As of match played 5 September 2026

Appearances and goals by club, season and competition
| Club | Season | League | | | FA Cup | | EFL Cup | | Other | | Total | |
| Club | Season | Division | Apps | Goals | Apps | Goals | Apps | Goals | Apps | Goals | Apps | Goals |
|---|---|---|---|---|---|---|---|---|---|---|---|---|
| Dagenham & Redbridge | 2016–17 | National League | 0 | 0 | 0 | 0 | — | | 2 (Note: Appearances in Essex Senior Cup) | 0 | 2 | 0 |
| Dagenham & Redbridge | 2017–18 | National League | 2 | 1 | 0 | 0 | — | | 1 | 0 | 3 | 1 |
| Dagenham & Redbridge | 2018–19 | National League | 34 | 2 | 1 | 0 | — | | 3 (Note: 1 appearance in Essex Senior Cup, 2 appearances in FA Trophy) | 0 | 38 | 2 |
| Dagenham & Redbridge | 2019–20 | National League | 14 | 0 | 1 | 0 | — | | 4 (Note: 3 appearances in Essex Senior Cup, 1 appearance in FA Trophy) | 0 | 19 | 0 |
| Dagenham & Redbridge | Total | | 50 | 3 | 2 | 0 | — | | 10 | 0 | 62 | 3 |
| Whitehawk (loan) | 2017–18 | National League South | 17 | 2 | — | | — | | — | | 17 | 2 |
| Hendon (loan) | 2017–18 | IL Premier Division | 3 | 0 | — | | — | | 3 (Note: 1 appearance in Alan Turvey Trophy, 1 appearance and 1 goal in the Middlesex Senior Cup, 1 appearance in the London Senior Cup) | 1 | 6 | 1 |
| Dartford (loan) | 2019–20 | National League South | 10 | 0 | — | | — | | — | | 10 | 0 |
| Bolton Wanderers | 2020–21 | League Two | 10 | 0 | 1 | 0 | 1 | 0 | 3 (Note: Appearances in EFL Trophy) | 0 | 15 | 0 |
| Bolton Wanderers | 2021–22 | League One | 13 | 0 | 2 | 0 | 2 | 0 | 4 | 0 | 21 | 0 |
| Bolton Wanderers | Total | | 23 | 0 | 3 | 0 | 3 | 0 | 7 | 0 | 36 | 0 |
| Dagenham & Redbridge (loan) | 2020–21 | National League | 23 | 4 | — | | — | | 2 (Note: Appearances in FA Trophy) | 0 | 25 | 4 |
| Walsall | 2022–23 | League Two | 30 | 1 | 4 | 0 | 0 | 0 | 2 | 0 | 36 | 1 |
| Walsall | 2023–24 | League Two | 44 | 2 | 4 | 0 | 0 | 0 | 1 | 0 | 49 | 2 |
| Walsall | 2024–25 | League Two | 44 | 3 | 2 | 1 | 3 | 0 | 5 (Note: 2 appearances in EFL Trophy, 3 appearances in League Two play-offs) | 0 | 54 | 4 |
| Walsall | Total | | 118 | 6 | 10 | 1 | 3 | 0 | 8 | 0 | 139 | 7 |
| Port Vale | 2025–26 | League One | 26 | 0 | 3 | 0 | 2 | 0 | 3 | 0 | 34 | 0 |
| Port Vale | 2026–27 | League Two | 5 | 0 | 0 | 0 | 1 | 0 | 0 | 0 | 6 | 0 |
| Port Vale | Total | | 31 | 0 | 3 | 0 | 3 | 0 | 3 | 0 | 40 | 0 |
| Career total | | | 275 | 15 | 18 | 1 | 9 | 0 | 33 | 1 | 335 | 17 |

=== International ===
As of match played 16 November 2026

Appearances and goals by national team and year
| National team | Year | Apps | Goals |
|---|---|---|---|
| Guyana | 2019 | 5 | 0 |
| Guyana | 2021 | 2 | 0 |
| Guyana | 2023 | 9 | 1 |
| Guyana | 2024 | 8 | 1 |
| Guyana | 2025 | 2 | 0 |
| Guyana | 2026 | 7 | 1 |
| Total | | 33 | 3 |

Guyana score listed first, score column indicates score after each Gordon goal

List of international goals scored by Liam Gordon
| No. | Date | Venue | Cap | Opponent | Score | Result | Competition |
|---|---|---|---|---|---|---|---|
| 1 | 25 March 2023 | Bermuda National Stadium, Hamilton, Bermuda | 8 | Bermuda | 1–0 | 2–0 | 2022–23 CONCACAF Nations League |
| 2 | 11 June 2024 | Wildey Turf, Wildey, Barbados | 20 | Belize | 2–0 | 3–1 | 2026 FIFA World Cup qualification |
| 3 | 27 September 2026 | Windsor Park, Roseau, Dominica | 30 | Cayman Islands | 1–0 | 2–0 | 2026–27 CONCACAF Nations League |

== Honours ==
Bolton Wanderers

- EFL League Two third-place promotion: 2020–21
