= Taylor Allen =

English footballer (born 2000)

Personal information
- Full name: Taylor Ellis Allen
- Date of birth: 16 June 2000 (age 26)
- Place of birth: Walsall, England
- Height: 1.85 m (6 ft 1 in)
- Positions: Centre-back; left-back

Team information
- Current team: Salford City (on loan from Wycombe Wanderers)
- Number: 24

Youth career
- 2016–2017: Romulus

Senior career*
Years	Team	Apps	(Gls)
2016–2018	Romulus	7	(0)
2017–2018	→ Stafford Town (loan)	25	(4)
2018–2019	Wolverhampton Sporting Community	11	(5)
2019	Nuneaton Borough	16	(2)
2019–2022	Forest Green Rovers	14	(1)
2019–2020	→ Hereford (loan)	8	(1)
2020	→ Gloucester City (loan)	6	(0)
2020–2021	→ Leamington (loan)	8	(1)
2022–2025	Walsall	95	(13)
2025–	Wycombe Wanderers	34	(1)
2026–	→ Salford City (loan)	9	(1)
- * Club domestic league appearances and goals as of 18 October 2026 (UTC)

Taylor Ellis Allen (born 16 June 2000) is an English professional footballer who plays as a centre-back or left-back for EFL League Two club Salford City, on loan from EFL League One club Wycombe Wanderers.

== Career ==
=== Romulus ===
Allen began his career at the academy of Midland Football League side Romulus while completing an apprenticeship as a sports coach, scoring 3 goals in 17 appearances for Romulus Reserves during 2016–17.

After spending 2017–18 on loan, Allen rejoined Romulus in August 2018 and he debuted during the 3–2 loss against Walsall Wood on 4 August 2018. He left Romulus in October 2018.

==== Loan to Stafford Town ====
Allen left to join Stafford Town on loan in August 2017 where he made 30 appearances and scored 5 goals.

He debuted for Stafford Town on 12 August 2017 as a substitute during the 4–2 loss against Hinckley AFC. He scored his first goal for Stafford Town on 23 September 2017 during the 4–1 victory against Ashby Ivanhoe in the FA Vase second qualifying round.

Allen also played in the penalty shoot-out victory against EFL League Two club Port Vale in the Staffordshire Senior Cup on 6 December 2017.

=== Wolverhampton Sporting Community ===
Allen joined Wolverhampton Sporting Community in October 2018. He debuted on 27 October 2018 during the 1–1 draw against Loughborough University. He scored his first goal for the club on 15 December 2018 and it was the equaliser during the 1–1 draw against Worcester City.

=== Nuneaton Borough ===
Allen joined Nuneaton Borough in January 2019, winning man of the match on his National League North debut, before having a trial with Leicester City in March, where he played for the under-23 team in Premier League 2.

=== Forest Green Rovers ===
Allen turned down offers from English Premier League clubs to sign for Forest Green Rovers in summer 2019 on a one-year deal. He made his EFL League Two debut as a substitute against Oldham Athletic on 3 August 2019, scoring the only goal of the game in the 72nd minute. Taylor joined National League North side Hereford on 25 October 2019 on a one month loan, with the loan being extended on 27 November 2019 for a further month. Taylor then joined Gloucester City on loan for an initial month. On 2 December 2020, Allen joined Leamington on an initial one-month loan deal. The loan was then extended for a further month. On 9 February 2021, the loan was further extended for an additional month.

=== Walsall ===
On 20 June 2022, Allen agreed to join League Two club Walsall on a one-year contract from 1 July when his Forest Green contract were to expire. He signed a contract extension at the end of the 2023 season.

Allen scored his first Walsall goal in a 3–1 win over Wrexham on 29 December 2023 and captained the club for the first time in a 3–0 win over Morecambe. He signed a further extension to 2026 at the end of the 2024 season. He made his 100th appearance in all competitions for Walsall in a 2–1 loss to Colchester on 8 February 2025 in a match where he also received a red card. After the match he apologised to Walsall fans for this. At the end of the season he was named Walsall Player of the Season for 2024–25 after a 4th place finish and 17 goal contributions. Alongside teammate Connor Barrett he was named into the EFL League Two Team of the Season.

=== Wycombe Wanderers ===
On 26 June 2025, Taylor Allen signed for League One side Wycombe Wanderers for an undisclosed fee.

He made his Wycombe Wanderers debut during the 2–1 EFL League One loss against Bradford City on 2 August 2025. He suffered with a knee injury through November and December 2025, and returned as a second-half substitute on 26 December 2025 during the 4–0 loss against Luton Town.

He scored his first goal for Wycombe Wanderers on 2 May 2026 during the 3–2 victory against Rotherham United.

==== Loan to Salford City ====
On 28 August 2026, Allen joined Salford City on a season-long loan. He debuted for Salford City on 29 August 2026 during the 1–0 loss against Shrewsbury Town in EFL League Two.

== Career statistics ==
As of match played 1 September 2026

Appearances and goals by club, season and competition
Club	Season	League			FA Cup		League Cup		Other		Total	
Club	Season	Division	Apps	Goals	Apps	Goals	Apps	Goals	Apps	Goals	Apps	Goals
Romulus	2016–17	MFL Premier Division	0	0	—		—		—		0	0
Romulus	2017–18	MFL Premier Division	0	0	—		—		—		0	0
Romulus	2018–19	MFL Premier Division	7	0	2	0	—		1 (Note: One appearance in FA Vase)	0	10	0
Stafford Town (loan)	2017–18	MFL Premier Division	25	4	—		—		5 (Note: Two appearances and one goal in FA Vase; two appearances in Staffordshire Senior Cup; one appearance in Polymac Packaging League Cup)	1	30	5
Wolverhampton Sporting Community	2018–19	MFL Premier Division	11	5	—		—		0	0	11	5
Nuneaton Borough	2018–19	National League North	16	2	0	0	—		0	0	16	2
Nuneaton Borough	Total		59	11	2	0	—		6	1	67	12
Forest Green Rovers	2019–20	EFL League Two	5	1	0	0	2	0	1 (Note: Appearance(s) in Football League Trophy)	0	8	1
Forest Green Rovers	2020–21	EFL League Two	5	0	0	0	0	0	3	0	8	0
Forest Green Rovers	2021–22	EFL League Two	4	0	0	0	1	0	4	0	9	0
Forest Green Rovers	Total		14	1	0	0	3	0	8	0	25	1
Hereford (loan)	2019–20	National League North	8	1	0	0	—		0	0	8	1
Gloucester City (loan)	2019–20	National League North	6	0	0	0	—		0	0	6	0
Leamington (loan)	2020–21	National League North	8	1	0	0	—		0	0	8	1
Walsall	2022–23	EFL League Two	22	0	3	0	1	0	3	0	29	0
Walsall	2023–24	EFL League Two	28	3	1	0	1	0	3	0	33	3
Walsall	2024–25	EFL League Two	45	10	2	0	3	0	7 (Note: Four appearances in Football League Trophy, three appearances and one goal in EFL League Two play-offs)	1	57	11
Wycombe Wanderers	2025–26	EFL League One	34	1	0	0	2	0	0	0	36	1
Wycombe Wanderers	2026–27	EFL League One	0	0	0	0	0	0	1 (Note: Four appearances in Football League Trophy, three appearances and one goal in EFL League Two play-offs)	0	1	0
Salford City (loan)	2026–27	EFL League Two	2	1	0	0	0	0	0	0	2	1
Salford City (loan)	Total		153	17	8	0	7	0	20	2	179	18
Career total			226	28	8	0	10	0	28	2	271	31

== Honours ==
Forest Green Rovers

- EFL League Two: 2021–22

Individual

- Walsall Player of the Season: 2024–25
- EFL League Two Team of the Season: 2024–25
- PFA Team of the Year: 2024–25 League Two
