= Harry Williams (footballer, born 2002) =

English association football player

Personal information
- Full name: Harry William Williams
- Date of birth: 15 August 2002 (age 24)
- Place of birth: Warwickshire, England
- Height: 1.95 m (6 ft 5 in)
- Position: Defender

Team information
- Current team: Walsall
- Number: 24

Youth career
- 2015–2021: West Bromwich Albion
- 2021–2022: Burnley

Senior career*
Years	Team	Apps	(Gls)
2022–2023	Alvechurch	39	(3)
2023–	Walsall	44	(3)

International career
2017	England U15	1	(0)
- * Club domestic league appearances and goals as of 10:01, 16 August 2025 (UTC)

Harry William Williams (born 15 August 2002) is an English professional footballer who plays as a defender for EFL League Two club Walsall.

== Career ==
Williams was a youth player at West Bromwich Albion but left following the conclusion of his contract in 2021. He had trials with Burnley and Aston Villa, playing for both in Premier League 2, before signing with Burnley for the 2021–22 season.

Williams joined Alvechurch in 2022 and scoring three goals in thirty-nine appearances during the 2022–23 season. With Alvechurch, he helped upset EFL League One side Cheltenham Town to reach the second round of the FA Cup in November 2022, as the lowest ranked team left in the competition.

He signed for Walsall in July 2023 for an undisclosed fee, signing a one-year contract with the option of another. On 5 August 2023, he made his league debut for Walsall in a 1–2 EFL League Two defeat to Morecambe. On February 1st, 2024 manager Mat Sadler revealed that Williams would miss the rest of the season with hip flexor injury. He returned to football on August 13 in a EFL Cup fixture against Exeter City. He scored his first goal for the Saddlers in a 2-6 loss at home to Fleetwood. On 10 September 2025 Williams signed a contract extension with the saddlers until 2027, this came after a breakthrough season where he played 56 times in all competitions however, suffered a major achilles injury in the league 2 play off final meaning he was predicted to miss the entire next season.

== International career ==
Williams represented England at under-15 level in February 2017, playing in a friendly against Belgium at St George's Park National Football Centre.

== Style of play ==
Williams was described by Mat Sadler, the manager who gave him his professional league debut, as being "good in the air", and that he "loves heading the football".
