= Jamie Jellis =

English footballer (born 2001)

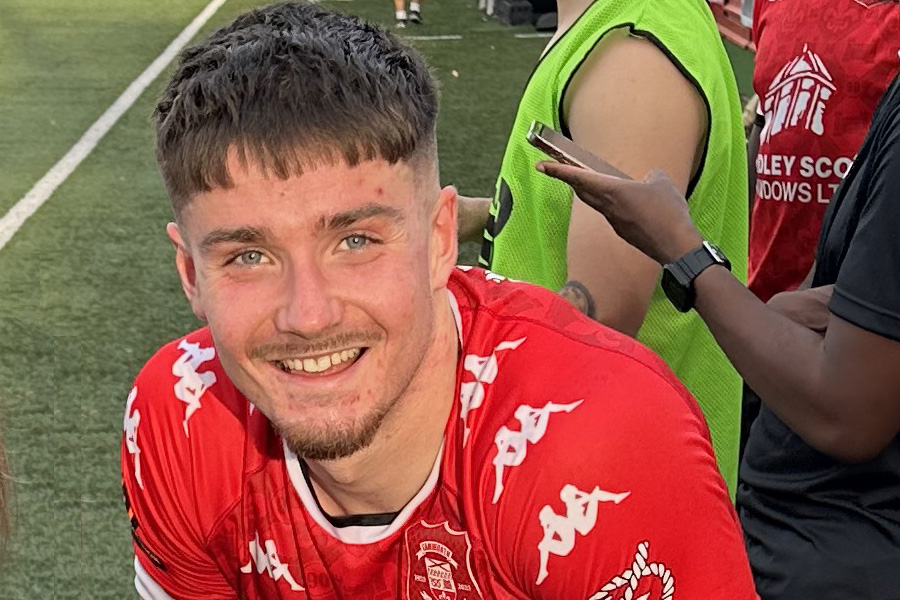
- Jellis at Tamworth

Personal information
- Full name: Jamie Ryan Jellis
- Date of birth: 12 January 2001 (age 25)
- Height: 1.74 m (5 ft 9 in)
- Position: Midfielder

Team information
- Current team: Rotherham United
- Number: 22

Youth career
- Aylesbury United

Senior career*
Years	Team	Apps	(Gls)
2017	Aylesbury United	4	(2)
2017	Tring Corinthians	1	(0)
2017–2020	Stevenage	0	(0)
2019	→ Aylesbury United (loan)	6	(0)
2019–2020	→ Hitchin Town (loan)	4	(1)
2020	→ Wingate & Finchley (loan)	5	(0)
2020–2021	Aylesbury United	7	(1)
2021–2022	Kings Langley	27	(5)
2022	Hemel Hempstead Town	1	(0)
2022–2023	Kings Langley	12	(1)
2022–2023	→ Tamworth (loan)	17	(1)
2023–2024	Tamworth	27	(4)
2024–2026	Walsall	80	(6)
2026–	Rotherham United	4	(0)
- * Club domestic league appearances and goals as of 18:30, 21 October 2026 (UTC)

Jamie Ryan Jellis (born 12 January 2001) is an English professional footballer who plays as a midfielder for Rotherham United.

== Career ==
=== Early career and Stevenage ===
Jellis began his career with Aylesbury United, making his first-team debut at the age of 16, scoring on his debut as a substitute in a 1–3 loss at Bedford Town. He made 10 appearances for Aylesbury before his 17th birthday and, following a brief spell with Tring Corinthians, signed for League Two side Stevenage in November 2017. Following a series of injuries, including a broken leg, Jellis had two successful loan spells in the early part of the 2019–20 season, at former club Aylesbury and Hitchin Town. On his return to Stevenage, he turned professional in January 2020. Shortly after signing pro-terms at Stevenage, Jellis spent a month on loan at Wingate & Finchley. He was released by Stevenage in 2020.

=== Return to non-league football ===
After leaving Stevenage he returned to Aylesbury for a third spell, before moving to Kings Langley in October 2021. A brief spell at Hemel Hempstead Town followed in February 2022, before Jellis returned to Kings Langley for the start of the 2022–23 season.

Later in 2022, Jellis joined Tamworth on loan for a month, before returning on loan again in February 2023. He joined Tamworth permanently in the summer of 2023. Jellis was part of the Lambs side that won back-to-back league titles by securing the Southern League Premier Division Central title in 2023 and the National League North title in 2024.

=== Walsall ===
Jellis signed for Walsall in January 2024. Having suffered an injury whilst playing for Tamworth, in April 2024 he was said to be close to first-team action, and he made his debut on 13 April 2024, appearing as a late substitute in a 1–3 home defeat to Notts County. He scored his first goal in an EFL Cup tie against Exeter City in the 90th minute allowing Walsall to win on penalties. He won League Two Goal of the month for October 2024 with a volley against Grimsby Town on 19 October in a 4–1 win for Walsall.

He was released by Walsall at the end of the 2025–26 season.

=== Rotherham United ===
In July 2026 he signed for Rotherham United.

== Career statistics ==
As of match played 20 October 2026

Appearances and goals by club, season and competition
Club	Season	League			FA Cup		League Cup		Other		Total	
Club	Season	Division	Apps	Goals	Apps	Goals	Apps	Goals	Apps	Goals	Apps	Goals
Aylesbury United	2017–18	Southern League; Division One East	4	2	5	0	—		1 (Note: Appearance(s) in Berks & Bucks Senior Cup)	0	10	2
Tring Corinthians	2017–18	South Midlands League; Division Two	1	0	—		—		—		1	0
Stevenage	2017–18	League Two	0	0	0	0	—		—		0	0
Stevenage	2018–19	League Two	0	0	0	0	0	0	0	0	0	0
Stevenage	2019–20	League Two	0	0	0	0	0	0	0	0	0	0
Stevenage	Total		0	0	0	0	0	0	0	0	0	0
Aylesbury United (loan)	2019–20	Southern League; Division One South	6	0	—		—		2 (Note: One appearance and goal in Berks & Bucks Senior Cup and one appearance in FA Trophy)	1	8	1
Hitchin Town (loan)	2019–20	Southern League; Premier Central	4	1	—		—		—		0	0
Wingate & Finchley (loan)	2019–20	Isthmian League Premier	5	0	—		—		2 (Note: One appearance in Middlesex Senior Cup and one appearance in London Senior Cup)	0	7	0
Aylesbury United	2020–21	Southern League; Premier South	1	0	0	0	—		1	0	2	0
Aylesbury United	2021–22	Southern League; Premier South	6	1	5	6	1	0	—		12	7
Aylesbury United	Total		17	3	10	6	1	0	4	1	32	10
Kings Langley	2021–22	Southern League; Premier South	27	5	0	0	—		2 (Note: One appearance in Hertfordshire Senior Cup and one appearance in FA Trophy)	0	29	5
Hemel Hempstead Town	2021–22	National League South	1	0	—		—		—		1	0
Kings Langley	2022–23	Southern League; Premier South	12	1	2	0	—		1 (Note: Appearance in Hertfordshire Senior Cup)	1	15	2
Tamworth (loan)	2022–23	Southern League; Premier Central	17	1	0	0	—		2 (Note: One appearance in FA Trophy and one appearance in Birmingham Senior Cup)	0	19	1
Tamworth	2023–24	National League North	27	4	3	1	—		1 (Note: Appearance in FA Trophy)	0	31	5
Walsall	2023–24	League Two	2	0	—		—		—		2	0
Walsall	2024–25	League Two	43	5	2	1	3	1	7 (Note: Four appearances in EFL Trophy, three appearances in the play-offs)	0	55	7
Walsall	2025–26	League Two	35	1	3	0	1	0	4 (Note: Appearances in the EFL Trophy)	0	43	1
Walsall	Total		80	6	5	1	4	1	11	0	100	8
Rotherham United	2026–27	League Two	4	0	0	0	1	0	0	0	5	0
Career total			195	21	20	8	6	1	23	2	244	32

== Honours ==
Tamworth

- Southern League Premier Division Central: 2022–23
- National League North: 2023–24

Individual

- National League North Team of the Season: 2023–24
