= Nelson Jardim =

Portuguese football manager (born 1974)

Personal information
- Full name: Nelson Marques Jardim
- Date of birth: 4 January 1979 (age 47)
- Place of birth: Funchal, Madeira

Managerial career
- Years: Team
- 2003–2004: Santana
- 2005–2006: Caniçal
- 2022–2024: Marítimo B
- 2024–2025: Newport County

Nelson Marques Jardim (born 4 January 1979) is a Portuguese football manager who was most recently the head coach of EFL League Two club Newport County.

== Coaching career ==
Born in Funchal, Jardim began his career with the B-side of the under-13 squad of Leixões in 1999. He had his first senior managerial experience in 2003, with UD Santana, after previously managing their under-19 squad in the previous season.

In 2006, after another senior experience at the helm of CF Caniçal, Jardim joined Marítimo as a coach of the under-17 team. During his two-year spell, he won two regional titles and also worked as an assistant of Nélson Caldeira and Mitchell van der Gaag in the B-team.

After a brief stint at Nacional's youth sides, Jardim joined Paulo Sousa's staff at Swansea City and Leicester City, both as fitness coach. On 5 June 2011, he was named Ivo Vieira's assistant back at Nacional.

Jardim returned to the Swans in 2017 as a lead academy coach, later working as a first team coach under Francesco Guidolin, Paul Clement and Carlos Carvalhal. In August 2020, he was announced as a part of Aitor Karanka's new backroom staff at Birmingham City.

On 25 June 2022, Jardim was named head coach of Marítimo B. On 27 May 2024, he left the club after two years in charge.

Jardim returned to the United Kingdom on 2 July 2024, joining the EFL League Two side Newport County coaching staff as lead coach while the South Wales club continued their search for a new head coach. However, on 16 July 2024, Jardim was announced as Newport County head coach. Jardim left Newport County by mutual consent on 24 April 2025 with the club in 20th position in League Two and safe from relegation with two games to play of the 2024–25 season.

== Managerial statistics ==
As of 21 April 2025

Managerial record by team and tenure
Team	Nat	From	To	Record					Ref
Team	Nat	From	To	G	W	D	L	Win %	Ref
Newport County	(Wales)	16 July 2024	24 April 2025	49	14	10	25	28.57	
Total				49	14	10	25	28.57	
