= Nathan Lowe =

English footballer (born 2005)

Personal information
- Full name: Nathan Alexander Lowe
- Date of birth: 18 September 2005 (age 21)
- Place of birth: Harlow, England
- Height: 1.93 m (6 ft 4 in)
- Position: Forward

Team information
- Current team: Hibernian (on loan from Stoke City)
- Number: 9

Youth career
- 2014–2016: Egerton
- 2016–2023: Stoke City

Senior career*
Years	Team	Apps	(Gls)
2023–	Stoke City	24	(2)
2024–2025	→ Walsall (loan)	22	(15)
2025–2026	→ Stockport County (loan)	19	(3)
2026	→ Wycombe Wanderers (loan)	12	(4)
2026–	→ Hibernian (loan)	8	(1)

International career
2023	England U19	3	(0)
- * Club domestic league appearances and goals as of 13:32, 22 October 2026 (UTC)

Nathan Alexander Lowe (born 18 September 2005) is an English professional footballer who plays as a forward for Scottish Premiership club Hibernian on loan from EFL Championship club Stoke City.

== Club career ==
=== Stoke City ===
Lowe was born in Harlow and played youth football for Bishop's Stortford before his family moved to Cheshire where he attended Lymm High School. He played for Egerton before joining the Stoke City academy in May 2016. Lowe signed a professional contract on his 17th birthday in September 2022. Lowe made his senior debut on 18 February 2023 in a 1–0 defeat away at Blackpool. Lowe scored his first goal in senior football on 30 September 2023, earning Stoke a late 3–2 victory against Bristol City. Lowe signed a new four-and-a-half-year contract with Stoke in January 2024.

Lowe joined League Two side Walsall, on 22 August 2024 on loan for the 2024–25 season. Lowe scored his first two goals in a 3–2 win in the EFL Cup against Huddersfield Town; he had missed a penalty earlier in the match. Lowe scored his first league goal in a 2–1 win over Cheltenham Town. After scoring ten goals in 18 matches for the Saddlers, Lowe was named as EFL Young Player of the Month for October 2024. His good form continued as Walsall pulled twelve points clear at the top of the league, five goals and one assist seeing him named EFL League Two Player of the Month for December 2024. After scoring 18 goals in 30 appearances for Walsall, Lowe was recalled by Stoke on 12 January 2025. Lowe scored on his first game back for the club, in a 1–1 away draw at West Bromwich Albion. On April 27 2025, he was named EFL League Two Young Player of the Season.

On 30 July 2025, Lowe joined League One side Stockport County on loan for the 2025–26 season. After scoring seven goals in 26 appearances for the Hatters, Lowe returned to Stoke due to injury. In January 2026, Lowe joined Wycombe Wanderers on loan for the remainder of the 2025–26 season. He scored a goal on his debut for Wycombe against Stevenage. Lowe made 14 appearances for the Chairboys, scoring four goals which included a brace in a 3–3 draw away at Huddersfield Town.

On 14 July 2026, Lowe agreed a contract extension through until 2029, and joined Scottish Premiership club Hibernian on loan for the 2026–27 season. On 30 July, Lowe scored his first goal for Hibs in a 4–1 UEFA Conference League qualifier victory against Kosovan side Malisheva.

== International career ==
Lowe was called up to the England U19 squad for the first time in October 2023. He made his U19 debut during a goalless draw with Montenegro in 2024 U19 EURO qualifying.

== Career statistics ==
As of match played 30 July 2026

Appearances and goals by club, season and competition
Club	Season	League			National cup (Note: Includes FA Cup)		League cup (Note: Includes EFL Cup)		Other		Total	
Club	Season	Division	Apps	Goals	Apps	Goals	Apps	Goals	Apps	Goals	Apps	Goals
Stoke City	2022–23	Championship	1	0	1	0	0	0	—		2	0
Stoke City	2023–24	Championship	13	1	1	0	1	0	—		15	1
Stoke City	2024–25	Championship	10	1	0	0	0	0	—		10	1
Stoke City	2025–26	Championship	0	0	0	0	0	0	—		0	0
Stoke City	2026–27	Championship	0	0	0	0	0	0	—		0	0
Stoke City	Total		24	2	2	0	1	0	0	0	27	2
Walsall (loan)	2024–25	League Two	22	15	2	0	2	2	4 (Note: Appearances in EFL Trophy)	1	30	18
Stockport County (loan)	2025–26	League One	19	3	2	1	2	1	3	2	26	7
Wycombe Wanderers (loan)	2025–26	League One	12	4	0	0	0	0	0	0	12	4
Hibernian (loan)	2026–27	Scottish Premiership	5	1	0	0	1	0	6 (Note: Appearances in UEFA Conference League)	1	12	2
Career total			82	25	6	1	1	2	13	4	107	33

== Honours ==
Individual

- EFL Young Player of the Month: October 2024
- EFL League Two Player of the Month: December 2024
- EFL League Two Young Player of the Season: 2024–25
