= Levi Amantchi =

English footballer (born 2000)

Personal information
- Full name: Hanani Levi Micael Amantchi
- Date of birth: 26 November 2000 (age 25)
- Place of birth: Lewisham, England
- Height: 6 ft 3 in (1.91 m)
- Position: Forward

Team information
- Current team: Kidderminster Harriers (on loan from Gateshead)
- Number: 12

Youth career
- Wallsend Boys Club

Senior career*
Years	Team	Apps	(Gls)
2018–2020	Chesterfield	11	(0)
2019	→ Mickleover Sports (loan)		
2019	→ Blyth Spartans (loan)	14	(2)
2020	Workington	1	(0)
2020	Darlington	2	(0)
2020	Blyth Spartans	6	(0)
2021	Workington	1	(0)
2021–2022	Redditch United	1	(0)
2022	Potters Bar Town	2	(0)
2022	Braintree Town	14	(6)
2022–2023	Brackley Town	22	(6)
2023	Maidstone United	20	(13)
2023–2025	Bromley	18	(0)
2025–2026	Walsall	18	(3)
2025–2026	→ Rochdale (loan)	18	(1)
2026–	Gateshead	19	(0)
2026–	→ Kidderminster Harriers (loan)	5	(1)
- * Club domestic league appearances and goals as of 13:19, 18 July 2026 (UTC)

Hanani Levi Micael Amantchi (born 26 November 2000) is an English professional footballer who plays as a forward for Kidderminster Harriers, on loan from National League club Gateshead.

== Career ==
Born in London, Amantchi played youth football for Wallsend Boys Club before joining Chesterfield as a 17-year-old.

Amantchi is a lifelong supporter of Newcastle United.

On 26 February 2019, Amantchi joined Mickleover Sports on a month-long loan.

Amantchi joined National League North side Blyth Spartans on loan in September 2019. He returned to Chesterfield at the end of his loan spell in January 2020, having scored twice in 14 National League North games.

He left Chesterfield in summer 2020 after the club chose not to renew his contract.

After a trial spell at Middlesbrough in September 2020, and a single appearance for Workington in a 1–0 win away to Colne, Amantchi signed for National League North side Darlington on a non-contract basis on 9 October 2020. He played three games for Darlington in all competitions.

On 27 November 2020, Amantchi rejoined Blyth Spartans on a non-contract basis.

Amantchi returned to Workington on 10 September 2021, but again made just one appearance for the club.

In November 2021, he signed for Southern League Premier Division Central club Redditch United. He transferred to Isthmian League Premier Division side Potters Bar Town in January 2022.

He joined Braintree Town on trial in July 2022, before agreeing terms with the club later that month.

He joined Brackley Town of the National League North in November 2022, and scored 6 goals in 22 matches over the remainder of the season.

In June 2023, Amantchi signed for Maidstone United in the National League South.

On 18 December 2023, it was announced that Amantchi had signed for National League club Bromley. He made his EFL League Two debut on 10 August 2024 as an 89th-minute substitute in a 2–0 win away at Harrogate Town. He scored his first goal for the club with the opening goal of a 2–1 EFL Cup defeat to AFC Wimbledon on 13 August.

Amantchi joined League Two rivals Walsall on 31 January 2025 on an 18-month contract with the option for a further year; the fee was undisclosed. He made his debut the next day in a 2–2 draw with Salford City. In July 2025, he joined National League side Rochdale on loan until January 2026.

On 8 January 2026, Amantchi joined National League club Gateshead on a permanent deal until the end of the season.

On 17 July 2026, Amantchi joined newly promoted National League side Kidderminster Harriers on a season-long loan.

== Career statistics ==
As of 8 January 2026

Appearances and goals by club, season and competition
Club	Season	League			FA Cup		EFL Cup		Other		Total	
Club	Season	Division	Apps	Goals	Apps	Goals	Apps	Goals	Apps	Goals	Apps	Goals
Chesterfield	2018–19	National League	11	0	4	0	—		0	0	11	0
Chesterfield	2019–20	National League	0	0	0	0	—		0	0	0	0
Chesterfield	Total		11	0	4	0	—		0	0	15	0
Blyth Spartans (loan)	2019–20	National League North	14	2	0	0	—		0	0	14	2
Workington	2020–21	Northern Premier League North West Division	1	0	0	0	—		0	0	1	0
Darlington	2020–21	National League North	2	0	1	0	—		0	0	3	0
Blyth Spartans	2020–21	National League North	6	0	0	0	—		0	0	6	0
Workington	2021–22	Northern Premier League West Division	1	0	0	0	—		0	0	1	0
Redditch United	2021–22	Southern League Premier Division Central	1	0	0	0	—		0	0	1	0
Potters Bar Town	2021–22	Isthmian League Premier Division	2	0	0	0	—		0	0	2	0
Braintree Town	2022–23	National League North	14	6	0	0	—		0	0	14	6
Brackley Town	2022–23	National League South	22	6	0	0	—		0	0	22	6
Maidstone United	2023–24	National League South	20	13	3	3	—		1 (Note: Appearance(s) in FA Trophy)	1	24	17
Bromley	2023–24	National League	4	0	0	0	—		0	0	4	0
Bromley	2024–25	League Two	14	0	3	1	1	1	3 (Note: Appearances in EFL Trophy)	1	21	3
Bromley	Total		18	0	3	1	1	1	3	1	25	3
Walsall	2024–25	League Two	18	3	—		—		3 (Note: Appearances in EFL League Two play-offs)	1	21	4
Walsall	2025–26	League Two	0	0	0	0	0	0	0	0	0	0
Walsall	Total		18	3	0	0	0	0	3	1	21	4
Rochdale (loan)	2025–26	National League	14	0	1	0	—		1	1	16	1
Career total			144	30	12	4	1	1	8	4	165	39
