= Connor Barrett (footballer) =

English footballer (born 2002)

- Barrett playing for Wigan Athletic in 2026

Personal information
- Full name: Connor Ellis Barrett
- Date of birth: 1 March 2002 (age 24)
- Place of birth: Leicester, England
- Position: Right-back

Team information
- Current team: Wigan Athletic
- Number: 2

Youth career
- 2018–2020: Leicester City
- 2020–2021: Burnley

Senior career*
Years	Team	Apps	(Gls)
2021–2022	Kettering Town	39	(0)
2022–2024	AFC Fylde	80	(7)
2024–2026	Walsall	76	(3)
2026–	Wigan Athletic	15	(0)
- * Club domestic league appearances and goals as of 16:26, 14 November 2026 (UTC)

Connor Ellis Barrett (born 1 March 2002) is an English professional footballer who plays as a right-back for EFL League One club Wigan Athletic.

== Career ==
=== Early career ===
Born in Leicester, Barrett played with Leicester City and Burnley; he was released by Burnley in May 2021.

Barrett joined Kettering Town ahead of the 2021–22 season. He appeared 45 times for the club in his debut senior season in the National League North and won the Vice President's Player of the Year award.

He moved on to AFC Fylde in May 2022, signing a two-year contract. In his first season, Barrett helped the club win the National League North title and promotion to the National League.

=== Walsall ===
He signed for Walsall in June 2024. At the end of his first Walsall season he was named into the EFL League Two Team of the Season. He scored his first goal for the club during a 2-1 win over Swindon on the opening day of the 2025-26 season.

=== Wigan Athletic ===
On 10 June 2026, Barrett agreed to sign for League One club Wigan Athletic on a long-term deal for an undisclosed fee.

== Career statistics ==
As of match played on 14 November 2026

Appearances and goals by club, season and competition
Club	Season	League			FA Cup		EFL Cup		Other		Total	
Club	Season	Division	Apps	Goals	Apps	Goals	Apps	Goals	Apps	Goals	Apps	Goals
Kettering Town	2021–22	National League North	39	0	1	0	—		1 (Note: Appearance(s) in the FA Trophy)	0	41	0
AFC Fylde	2022–23	National League North	41	5	2	0	—		1	0	44	5
AFC Fylde	2023–24	National League	39	2	2	0	—		1	1	42	3
AFC Fylde	Total		80	7	2	0	0	0	1	0	83	7
Walsall	2024–25	League Two	43	0	2	0	3	0	5 (Note: Four appearances in the EFL Trophy, one appearance in the play-offs)	0	53	0
Walsall	2025–26	League Two	33	3	3	0	1	0	1 (Note: Appearance(s) in the EFL Trophy)	0	38	3
Walsall	Total		76	3	5	0	4	0	6	0	91	3
Wigan Athletic	2026–27	League One	15	0	1	0	1	0	2	1	19	1
Career total			210	10	11	0	5	0	11	2	237	12

== Honours ==
AFC Fylde

- National League North: 2022–23

Individual

- Kettering Town Vice President's Player of the Year: 2021–22
- EFL League Two Team of the Season: 2024–25
