= Alfie Chang =

English footballer

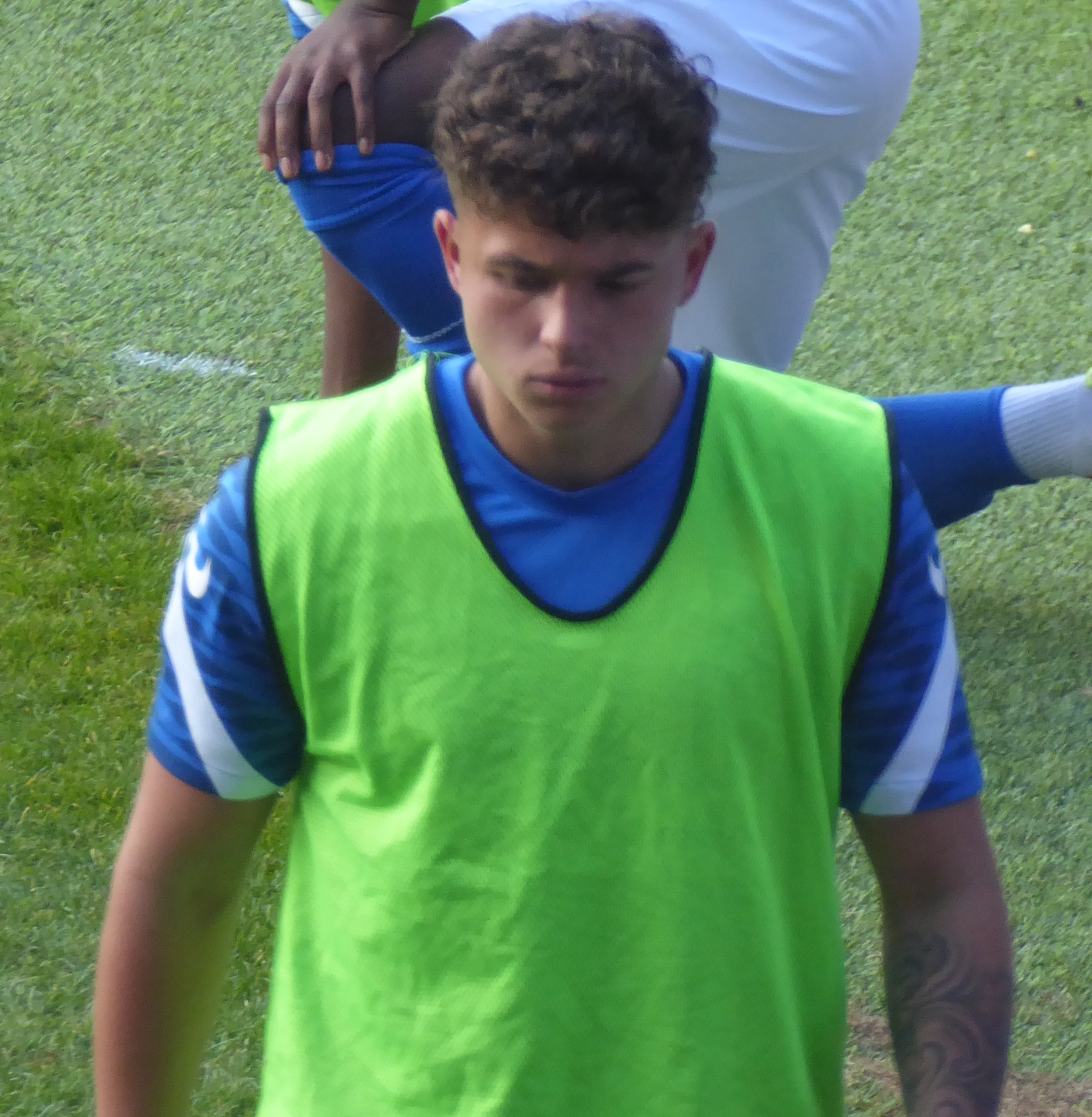
- Chang pictured in 2021

Personal information
- Full name: Alfie James Chang
- Date of birth: 4 September 2002 (age 24)
- Place of birth: Worcester, England
- Position: Midfielder

Team information
- Current team: Walsall

Youth career
- –2021: Birmingham City

Senior career*
Years	Team	Apps	(Gls)
2021–2026	Birmingham City	13	(0)
2025	→ Walsall (loan)	5	(0)
2025–2026	→ Bristol Rovers (loan)	16	(0)
2026	Walsall	1	(0)
- * Club domestic league appearances and goals as of 2 January 2026 (UTC)

Alfie James Chang (born 4 September 2002) is an English professional footballer who most recently played as a midfielder for EFL League Two club Walsall.

== Early life and career ==
Alfie James Chang was born in Worcester on 4 September 2002. He attended Droitwich Spa High School.

== Career ==
=== Birmingham City ===
He joined Birmingham City's Academy as an under-10, and took up a two-year scholarship in July 2019. According to the then academy manager Kristjaan Speakman, Chang "is most effective as a deep midfield player. In this position he is able to dictate the tempo of the game and through calm and composed possession is able to demonstrate an excellent range of passing. In higher areas of the pitch he has the creativity and cleverness to construct play able to create opening for forward players."

Playing in central midfield, he captained Birmingham's under-18s in their 2020–21 FA Youth Cup campaign, and played for Birmingham's U23 team as they beat Sheffield United U23 in the national final of that season's Professional Development League. Chang was one of five under-18s offered their first professional contract in 2021, and one of four who accepted.

Chang was given a squad number and named on the bench for Birmingham's 2021–22 EFL Cup first-round match at home to Colchester United of League One. He remained unused, but in the second round of the same competition, on 24 August, he replaced Dion Sanderson after 73 minutes to make his senior debut as Birmingham lost 2–0 at home to Fulham. His first senior start came a year later, in the first round of the 2022–23 EFL Cup away to Norwich City, which Birmingham lost on penalties. "A composed midfield performance" in that game was followed four days later by his Football League debut. With Ryan Woods on the verge of leaving the club, Chang started alongside Jordan James in central midfield in Birmingham's visit to Cardiff City in the Championship; he played 75 minutes of the 1–0 defeat. He went on to make 17 appearances in all competitions, including 13 matches (7 starts) in the Championship.

In August 2023, Chang suffered a "significant knee injury" in training, later revealed to be tears to the anterior and posterior cruciate ligaments, the medial collateral ligament and the meniscus, which kept him out for the entire 2023–24 season. He eventually returned to the first team on 11 January 2025, after 522 days out, as a second-half substitute against Lincoln City in the 2024–25 FA Cup with his side 2–0 ahead. In stoppage time, the referee awarded a penalty to Lincoln for a foul by Chang, which Birmingham manager Chris Davies thought would not have been given had VAR been available.

==== Walsall (loan) ====
With the aim of playing regular first-team football, Chang joined League Two club Walsall on 3 February 2025 on loan for the rest of the season.

==== Bristol Rovers (loan) ====
On 1 September 2025, Chang signed a season long loan deal with League Two club Bristol Rovers with an option to buy. On 6 September, he made his debut in a 3–2 victory over Newport County, assisting the third goal to cap off an impressive performance.. On 6 January 2026, Chang’s loan was terminated.

=== Walsall ===
On 30 January 2026, Chang had his Birmingham City contract terminated by mutual consent, returning to Walsall on a permanent deal until the end of the season.

== Career statistics ==
As of 30 January 2026

Appearances and goals by club, season and competition
Club	Season	League			FA Cup		EFL Cup		Other		Total	
Club	Season	Division	Apps	Goals	Apps	Goals	Apps	Goals	Apps	Goals	Apps	Goals
Birmingham City	2021–22	Championship	0	0	1	0	1	0	—		2	0
Birmingham City	2022–23	Championship	13	0	3	0	1	0	—		17	0
Birmingham City	2023–24	Championship	0	0	0	0	1	0	—		1	0
Birmingham City	2024–25	League One	0	0	1	0	0	0	0	0	1	0
Birmingham City	2025–26	Championship	0	0	0	0	0	0	—		0	0
Birmingham City	Total		13	0	5	0	3	0	0	0	21	0
Walsall (loan)	2024–25	League Two	5	0	—		—		3 (Note: Appearances in EFL League Two play-offs)	1	8	1
Bristol Rovers (loan)	2025–26	League Two	16	0	1	0	0	0	2 (Note: Appearance(s) in EFL Trophy)	0	19	0
Walsall	2025–26	League Two	1	0	0	0	0	0	0	0	1	0
Career total			35	0	6	0	3	0	5	1	49	1
