= List of English football transfers summer 2022 =

The 2022 English football summer transfer window ran from 10 June to 1 September 2022. Players without a club could be signed at any time, clubs could sign players on loan dependent on their league's regulations, and clubs could sign a goalkeeper on an emergency loan if they had no registered senior goalkeeper available. This list includes transfers featuring at least one club from either the Premier League or the EFL that were completed after the end of the winter 2021–22 transfer window on 2 February and before the end of the 2022 summer window.

== Transfers ==
All players and clubs without a flag are English. While Cardiff City, Swansea City and Newport County are affiliated with the Football Association of Wales and thus take the Welsh flag, they play in the Championship and League Two respectively, and so their transfers are included here.

Date	Name	Moving from	Moving to	Fee
10 March 2022	(Norway) Ørjan Nyland	Unattached	Reading	Free
11 March 2022	(Poland) Kamil Jóźwiak	Derby County	(United States) Charlotte	£2m
18 March 2022	Brandon Mason	Unattached	MK Dons	Free
18 March 2022	(Republic of Ireland) Keiren Westwood	Unattached	Queens Park Rangers	Free
19 March 2022	(France) Derick Osei	Unattached	AFC Wimbledon	Free
24 March 2022	Terell Thomas	Unattached	Reading	Free
24 March 2022	(Croatia) Filip Uremović	Unattached	Sheffield United	Free
4 April 2022	Jack Young	Newcastle United	Wycombe Wanderers	Undisclosed
12 May 2022	(Brazil) Philippe Coutinho	(Spain) Barcelona	Aston Villa	£17m
20 May 2022	Kelvin Mellor	Carlisle United	Crewe Alexandra	Free
20 May 2022	Jake Young	Forest Green Rovers	Bradford City	Undisclosed
22 May 2022	(Greece) Antonis Stergiakis	Blackburn Rovers	(Greece) Panetolikos	Free
26 May 2022	(United States) Brenden Aaronson	(Austria) Red Bull Salzburg	Leeds United	£25m
31 May 2022	Courtney Baker-Richardson	(Wales) Newport County	Crewe Alexandra	Free
31 May 2022	(Liberia) Mohammed Sangare	Newcastle United	Accrington Stanley	Free
1 June 2022	(Kenya) Jonah Ayunga	Morecambe	(Scotland) St Mirren	Free
1 June 2022	Dominic Ball	Queens Park Rangers	Ipswich Town	Free
1 June 2022	Peter Clarke	Tranmere Rovers	Walsall	Free
1 June 2022	Liam Hogan	Stockport County	Oldham Athletic	Free
1 June 2022	Will Wright	Dagenham and Redbridge	Gillingham	Free
2 June 2022	(Germany) Antonio Rüdiger	Chelsea	(Spain) Real Madrid	Free
4 June 2022	Matthew Dennis	Norwich City	MK Dons	Free
4 June 2022	(Republic of Ireland) Colin Doyle	(Scotland) Kilmarnock	Bradford City	Free
4 June 2022	(Sweden) Robin Olsen	(Italy) Roma	Aston Villa	Undisclosed
6 June 2022	Will Boyle	Cheltenham Town	Huddersfield Town	Free
6 June 2022	Scott Flinders	Cheltenham Town	Mansfield Town	Free
6 June 2022	Chris Porter	Crewe Alexandra	Oldham Athletic	Free
7 June 2022	Declan Drysdale	Coventry City	(Wales) Newport County	Undisclosed
7 June 2022	(Republic of Ireland) Corey O'Keeffe	Rochdale	Forest Green Rovers	Free
7 June 2022	(Republic of Ireland) Alex Pearce	Millwall	AFC Wimbledon	Free
8 June 2022	(Scotland) Theo Archibald	Lincoln City	Leyton Orient	Undisclosed
8 June 2022	Fraser Forster	Southampton	Tottenham Hotspur	Free
8 June 2022	(Northern Ireland) Patrick Kelly	(Northern Ireland) Coleraine	West Ham United	Undisclosed
8 June 2022	(Denmark) Rasmus Kristensen	(Austria) Red Bull Salzburg	Leeds United	Undisclosed
8 June 2022	Armani Little	Torquay United	Forest Green Rovers	Free
8 June 2022	(Republic of Ireland) Callum O'Dowda	Bristol City	(Wales) Cardiff City	Free
8 June 2022	Matt Targett	Aston Villa	Newcastle United	£15m
8 June 2022	Josh Vela	Shrewsbury Town	Fleetwood Town	Free
9 June 2022	(Belgium) Rocky Bushiri	Norwich City	(Scotland) Hibernian	Undisclosed
9 June 2022	(Czech Republic) Tomáš Holý	Ipswich Town	Carlisle United	Free
9 June 2022	(France) Alexandre Lacazette	Arsenal	(France) Lyon	Free
9 June 2022	(Scotland) Reece McAlear	Norwich City	Tranmere Rovers	Free
9 June 2022	Billy Waters	FC Halifax Town	Barrow	Free
9 June 2022	Kyle Wootton	Notts County	Stockport County	Free
10 June 2022	(Brazil) Diego Carlos	(Spain) Sevilla	Aston Villa	£26m
10 June 2022	(Republic of Ireland) Emmanuel Osadebe	Walsall	Bradford City	Undisclosed
10 June 2022	(United States) Cameron Carter-Vickers	Tottenham Hotspur	(Scotland) Celtic	£6m
10 June 2022	Kane Wilson	Forest Green Rovers	Bristol City	Free
10 June 2022	Nathan Wood	Middlesbrough	(Wales) Swansea City	Undisclosed
13 June 2022	Ethan Ebanks-Landell	Shrewsbury Town	Rochdale	Free
13 June 2022	(Scotland) Kyle Ferguson	Altrincham	Harrogate Town	Free
13 June 2022	(Brazil) Marquinhos	(Brazil) São Paulo	Arsenal	Undisclosed
13 June 2022	Joe Riley	Carlisle United	Walsall	Free
14 June 2022	Ethan Bristow	Reading	Tranmere Rovers	Free
14 June 2022	Charlie Colkett	Cheltenham Town	Crewe Alexandra	Free
14 June 2022	(Northern Ireland) Stephen Dooley	Rochdale	Harrogate Town	Undisclosed
14 June 2022	Ben Heneghan	AFC Wimbledon	Sheffield Wednesday	Free
14 June 2022	Jonjoe Kenny	Everton	(Germany) Hertha BSC	Free
14 June 2022	(Wales) Connor Lemonheigh-Evans	Torquay United	Stockport County	Free
14 June 2022	(Serbia) Nemanja Matić	Manchester United	(Italy) Roma	Free
14 June 2022	(Uruguay) Darwin Núñez	(Portugal) Benfica	Liverpool	£64m
14 June 2022	Solomon Nwabuokei	Unattached	Barrow	Free
14 June 2022	Ben Thompson	Gillingham	Peterborough United	Free
15 June 2022	Hiram Boateng	MK Dons	Mansfield Town	Free
15 June 2022	Vontae Daley-Campbell	Leicester City	(Wales) Cardiff City	Free
15 June 2022	Aden Flint	(Wales) Cardiff City	Stoke City	Free
15 June 2022	Matt Lowe	Brackley Town	Accrington Stanley	Free
15 June 2022	Niall Maher	FC Halifax Town	Grimsby Town	Free
15 June 2022	Ethan Robson	Blackpool	MK Dons	Free
15 June 2022	Devante Rodney	Walsall	Rochdale	Undisclosed
15 June 2022	(Antigua and Barbuda) Mahlon Romeo	Millwall	(Wales) Cardiff City	Undisclosed
15 June 2022	David Stockdale	Wycombe Wanderers	Sheffield Wednesday	Free
15 June 2022	Andy Williams	Cheltenham Town	Walsall	Free
16 June 2022	Ryan Allsop	Derby County	(Wales) Cardiff City	Free
16 June 2022	Max Clark	Rochdale	Stevenage	Free
16 June 2022	(France) Toumani Diagouraga	Morecambe	Rochdale	Free
16 June 2022	(Wales) Dom Jefferies	Brentford	Gillingham	Undisclosed
16 June 2022	(Wales) Kyle Letheren	Morecambe	Hartlepool United	Free
16 June 2022	(New Zealand) Jamie Searle	(Wales) Swansea City	Barnsley	Free
16 June 2022	(Australia) Ryan Williams	Oxford United	(Australia) Perth Glory	Undisclosed
17 June 2022	(Republic of Ireland) Gavin Bazunu	Manchester City	Southampton	£12m
17 June 2022	(Mali) Yves Bissouma	Brighton & Hove Albion	Tottenham Hotspur	£25m
17 June 2022	Alfie Burnett	Rotherham United	Forest Green Rovers	Free
17 June 2022	Harry Chapman	Blackburn Rovers	Bradford City	Free
17 June 2022	(Republic of Ireland) Luca Connell	(Scotland) Celtic	Barnsley	Free
17 June 2022	David Davis	Shrewsbury Town	Forest Green Rovers	Free
17 June 2022	(Paraguay) Julio César Enciso	(Paraguay) Libertad	Brighton & Hove Albion	Undisclosed
17 June 2022	Ben Fox	Grimsby Town	Northampton Town	Free
17 June 2022	(Scotland) Callum Hendry	(Scotland) St Johnstone	Salford City	Free
17 June 2022	(Poland) Mateusz Lis	(Turkey) Altay	Southampton	Free
17 June 2022	(Scotland) Kyle McAllister	(Scotland) St Mirren	Forest Green Rovers	Free
17 June 2022	Max Melbourne	Lincoln City	Morecambe	Free
17 June 2022	(Scotland) Sam Nicholson	Bristol Rovers	(United States) Colorado Rapids	Free
17 June 2022	Toyosi Olusanya	Middlesbrough	(Scotland) St Mirren	Free
17 June 2022	Danilo Orsi	Harrogate Town	Grimsby Town	Free
17 June 2022	Jordan Roberts	(Scotland) Motherwell	Stevenage	Free
17 June 2022	(Spain) Marc Roca	(Germany) Bayern Munich	Leeds United	£10m
17 June 2022	(Austria) Patrick Schmidt	Barnsley	(Austria) Admira Wacker	Free
17 June 2022	Jack Tucker	Gillingham	MK Dons	Undisclosed
17 June 2022	Charles Vernam	Bradford City	Lincoln City	Free
17 June 2022	Akil Wright	York City	Stockport County	Free
18 June 2022	Farrend Rawson	Mansfield Town	Morecambe	Free
18 June 2022	Dan Sweeney	Forest Green Rovers	Stevenage	Free
19 June 2022	(Netherlands) Kenneth Paal	(Netherlands) PEC Zwolle	Queens Park Rangers	Free
19 June 2022	(Scotland) Calvin Ramsay	(Scotland) Aberdeen	Liverpool	£4.2m
20 June 2022	(Morocco) Nayef Aguerd	(France) Rennes	West Ham United	£30m
20 June 2022	Taylor Allen	Forest Green Rovers	Walsall	Free
20 June 2022	Matt Butcher	Accrington Stanley	Plymouth Argyle	Free
20 June 2022	(Montserrat) Brandon Comley	Dagenham and Redbridge	Walsall	Free
20 June 2022	Alfie Doughty	Stoke City	Luton Town	Undisclosed
20 June 2022	Ryan Haynes	(Wales) Newport County	Northampton Town	Free
20 June 2022	(Jamaica) Greg Leigh	Morecambe	Ipswich Town	Free
20 June 2022	George Miller	Barnsley	Doncaster Rovers	Free
20 June 2022	(Republic of Ireland) Eoghan O'Connell	Rochdale	Charlton Athletic	Free
20 June 2022	(Scotland) Jayden Richardson	Nottingham Forest	(Scotland) Aberdeen	Undisclosed
20 June 2022	Tyrell Warren	FC Halifax Town	Barrow	Undisclosed
21 June 2022	Daniel Adshead	Norwich City	Cheltenham Town	Undisclosed
21 June 2022	(Germany) Armel Bella-Kotchap	(Germany) VfL Bochum	Southampton	£8.6m
21 June 2022	(Netherlands) Jordy de Wijs	Queens Park Rangers	(Germany) Fortuna Düsseldorf	Undisclosed
21 June 2022	Yan Dhanda	(Wales) Swansea City	(Scotland) Ross County	Free
21 June 2022	Mandela Egbo	Swindon Town	Charlton Athletic	Free
21 June 2022	(Wales) Owen Evans	Cheltenham Town	Walsall	Undisclosed
21 June 2022	(Republic of Ireland) Sam Foley	Tranmere Rovers	Barrow	Free
21 June 2022	(Colombia) Cucho Hernández	Watford	(United States) Columbus Crew	Undisclosed
21 June 2022	Danny Hylton	Luton Town	Northampton Town	Undisclosed
21 June 2022	Tom Ince	Stoke City	Reading	Free
21 June 2022	Travis Johnson	Crewe Alexandra	Crawley Town	Free
21 June 2022	Josh Laurent	Reading	Stoke City	Free
21 June 2022	Joe Mattock	Rotherham United	Harrogate Town	Free
21 June 2022	Luke Molyneux	Hartlepool United	Doncaster Rovers	Free
21 June 2022	(Jamaica) Kasey Palmer	Bristol City	Coventry City	Undisclosed
21 June 2022	(Wales) Adam Przybek	Wycombe Wanderers	Walsall	Free
21 June 2022	Liam Roberts	Northampton Town	Middlesbrough	Free
21 June 2022	Jordan Rossiter	Fleetwood Town	Bristol Rovers	Undisclosed
21 June 2022	Brendan Sarpong-Wiredu	Colchester United	Fleetwood Town	Undisclosed
21 June 2022	Anthony Stewart	Wycombe Wanderers	(Scotland) Aberdeen	Free
21 June 2022	(Scotland) Reghan Tumilty	(Scotland) Raith Rovers	Hartlepool United	Undisclosed
21 June 2022	(Wales) Will Vaulks	(Wales) Cardiff City	Sheffield Wednesday	Free
21 June 2022	(Portugal) Fábio Vieira	(Portugal) Porto	Arsenal	£34.2m
21 June 2022	Freddie Woodman	Newcastle United	Preston North End	Undisclosed
21 June 2022	Cauley Woodrow	Barnsley	Luton Town	Undisclosed
21 June 2022	(Republic of the Congo) Offrande Zanzala	Barrow	(Wales) Newport County	Free
22 June 2022	David Ajiboye	Sutton United	Peterborough United	Free
22 June 2022	Tom Bradbury	FC Halifax Town	Cheltenham Town	Free
22 June 2022	Robbie Cundy	Bristol City	Barnsley	Free
22 June 2022	Ryan Fredericks	West Ham United	Bournemouth	Free
22 June 2022	James Gibbons	Port Vale	Bristol Rovers	Free
22 June 2022	Nathan Holland	West Ham United	MK Dons	Free
22 June 2022	Isaac Hutchinson	Derby County	Walsall	Free
22 June 2022	Michael Ihiekwe	Rotherham United	Sheffield Wednesday	Free
22 June 2022	(Cyprus) Hector Kyprianou	Leyton Orient	Peterborough United	Undisclosed
22 June 2022	Matt Macey	Hibernian	Luton Town	Undisclosed
22 June 2022	(Senegal) Sadio Mané	Liverpool	(Germany) Bayern Munich	£35m
22 June 2022	Callum Morton	West Bromwich Albion	Fleetwood Town	Undisclosed
22 June 2022	Marlon Pack	(Wales) Cardiff City	Portsmouth	Free
22 June 2022	Richard Smallwood	Hull City	Bradford City	Free
22 June 2022	Michael Smith	Rotherham United	Sheffield Wednesday	Free
23 June 2022	Richie Bennett	Sutton United	Barrow	Undisclosed
23 June 2022	Ryan Edmondson	Leeds United	Carlisle United	Free
23 June 2022	(Republic of Ireland) Peter Kioso	Luton Town	Rotherham United	Undisclosed
23 June 2022	(Senegal) Mouhamed Niang	(Scotland) Partick Thistle	Hartlepool United	Free
23 June 2022	(Spain) Pipa	Huddersfield Town	(Greece) Olympiacos	Undisclosed
23 June 2022	Nick Pope	Burnley	Newcastle United	Undisclosed
23 June 2022	Kane Smith	Boreham Wood	Stevenage	Undisclosed
23 June 2022	Jed Wallace	Millwall	West Bromwich Albion	Free
23 June 2022	(Ghana) Joe Wollacott	Swindon Town	Charlton Athletic	Free
24 June 2022	(Ivory Coast) Simon Adingra	(Denmark) Nordsjælland	Brighton & Hove Albion	Undisclosed
24 June 2022	(Wales) James Connolly	(Wales) Cardiff City	Bristol Rovers	Undisclosed
24 June 2022	Reece Devine	Manchester United	Swindon Town	Free
24 June 2022	Tom Eaves	Hull City	Rotherham United	Free
24 June 2022	(Republic of Ireland) Conor Grant	Rochdale	MK Dons	Undisclosed
24 June 2022	(Scotland) Jake Hastie	(Scotland) Rangers	Hartlepool United	Free
24 June 2022	Alex Lacey	Notts County	Hartlepool United	Free
24 June 2022	(Republic of Ireland) Darragh Lenihan	Blackburn Rovers	Middlesbrough	Undisclosed
24 June 2022	(Republic of Ireland) Aiden McGeady	Sunderland	(Scotland) Hibernian	Free
24 June 2022	(Scotland) Euan Murray	(Scotland) Kilmarnock	Hartlepool United	Free
24 June 2022	(Spain) Fran Villalba	Birmingham City	(Spain) Sporting Gijón	Undisclosed
24 June 2022	(Denmark) Philip Zinckernagel	Watford	(Greece) Olympiacos	Undisclosed
25 June 2022	(Nigeria) Taiwo Awoniyi	(Germany) Union Berlin	Nottingham Forest	£17m
25 June 2022	Alex Cochrane	Brighton & Hove Albion	(Scotland) Heart of Midlothian	Undisclosed
25 June 2022	Joe Rothwell	Blackburn Rovers	Bournemouth	Free
25 June 2022	(Netherlands) Zian Flemming	(Netherlands) Fortuna Sittard	Millwall	Undisclosed
25 June 2022	(Republic of Ireland) Conor McCarthy	(Scotland) St Mirren	Barnsley	Free
25 June 2022	Ross Sykes	Accrington Stanley	(Belgium) Union SG	Undisclosed
26 June 2022	(Northern Ireland) Ciaron Brown	(Wales) Cardiff City	Oxford United	Free
26 June 2022	Malcolm Ebiowei	Derby County	Crystal Palace	Undisclosed
26 June 2022	Scott Twine	MK Dons	Burnley	Undisclosed
27 June 2022	(France) Alphonse Areola	(France) Paris Saint-Germain	West Ham United	£10.5m
27 June 2022	Tom Bayliss	Preston North End	Shrewsbury Town	Free
27 June 2022	(Wales) David Cornell	Peterborough United	Preston North End	Free
27 June 2022	Josh Earl	Preston North End	Fleetwood Town	Free
27 June 2022	Jorge Grant	Peterborough United	(Scotland) Heart of Midlothian	Undisclosed
27 June 2022	Fraser Horsfall	Northampton Town	Stockport County	Free
27 June 2022	Scott Kashket	Crewe Alexandra	Gillingham	Free
27 June 2022	Rod McDonald	Carlisle United	Crewe Alexandra	Free
27 June 2022	Mickel Miller	Rotherham United	Plymouth Argyle	Free
27 June 2022	George Ray	Exeter City	Barrow	Free
27 June 2022	Connor Ripley	Preston North End	Morecambe	Free
27 June 2022	(United States) Matt Turner	(United States) New England Revolution	Arsenal	Undisclosed
27 June 2022	(Scotland) Elliot Watt	Bradford City	Salford City	Undisclosed
27 June 2022	Stephen Wearne	Sunderland	Grimsby Town	Free
28 June 2022	(Democratic Republic of the Congo) Benik Afobe	Stoke City	Millwall	Free
28 June 2022	Chey Dunkley	Sheffield Wednesday	Shrewsbury Town	Free
28 June 2022	Cian Harries	Bristol Rovers	Swindon Town	Free
28 June 2022	Jordy Hiwula	Doncaster Rovers	(Scotland) Ross County	Free
28 June 2022	George Honeyman	Hull City	Millwall	Free
28 June 2022	Sam Hornby	Bradford City	Colchester United	Undisclosed
28 June 2022	Cameron John	Doncaster Rovers	Rochdale	Free
28 June 2022	Davis Keillor-Dunn	Oldham Athletic	Burton Albion	Free
28 June 2022	(Republic of Ireland) Luke McNally	Oxford United	Burnley	£1.6m
28 June 2022	(Japan) Takumi Minamino	Liverpool	(France) Monaco	£15.5m
28 June 2022	Alex Newby	Rochdale	Colchester United	Free
28 June 2022	(Belgium) Funso Ojo	(Scotland) Aberdeen	Port Vale	Free
28 June 2022	(Spain) Iván Sánchez	Birmingham City	(Spain) Real Valladolid	Undisclosed
29 June 2022	(Scotland) Oliver Burke	Sheffield United	(Germany) Werder Bremen	Undisclosed
29 June 2022	Anthony Glennon	Burnley	Grimsby Town	Free
29 June 2022	(Scotland) Liam McCarron	Leeds United	Stoke City	Undisclosed
29 June 2022	(Scotland) Conor McGrandles	Lincoln City	Charlton Athletic	Free
29 June 2022	George Moncur	Hull City	Leyton Orient	Undisclosed
29 June 2022	Ben Purrington	Charlton Athletic	(Scotland) Ross County	Free
29 June 2022	Miles Welch-Hayes	Burnley	Harrogate Town	Free
30 June 2022	(Cyprus) Anthony Georgiou	Unattached	Leyton Orient	Free
30 June 2022	Jon Nolan	Bristol Rovers	Tranmere Rovers	Free
30 June 2022	(The Gambia) Saikou Janneh	Bristol City	Cambridge United	Undisclosed
30 June 2022	(Republic of Ireland) Aiden O'Brien	Portsmouth	Shrewsbury Town	Free
30 June 2022	Jake Turner	Newcastle United	Gillingham	Free
1 July 2022	(The Gambia) Ebou Adams	Forest Green Rovers	(Wales) Cardiff City	Free
1 July 2022	Jak Alnwick	(Scotland) St Mirren	(Wales) Cardiff City	Free
1 July 2022	(Cameroon) André-Frank Zambo Anguissa	Fulham	(Italy) Napoli	Undisclosed
1 July 2022	Jay Benn	FC Halifax Town	Lincoln City	Undisclosed
1 July 2022	Harrison Biggins	Fleetwood Town	Doncaster Rovers	Free
1 July 2022	(Netherlands) Sven Botman	(France) Lille	Newcastle United	£32m
1 July 2022	Michael Bostwick	Burton Albion	Stevenage	Free
1 July 2022	(Wales) Sam Bowen	(Wales) Cardiff City	(Wales) Newport County	Undisclosed
1 July 2022	Cohen Bramall	Lincoln City	Rotherham United	Undisclosed
1 July 2022	Neill Byrne	Hartlepool United	Tranmere Rovers	Undisclosed
1 July 2022	(Portugal) Fábio Carvalho	Fulham	Liverpool	£7.7m
1 July 2022	Lewis Cass	Newcastle United	Port Vale	Free
1 July 2022	Aaron Chapman	Gillingham	Stevenage	Free
1 July 2022	Jake Clarke-Salter	Chelsea	Queens Park Rangers	Free
1 July 2022	(Nigeria) Jamilu Collins	(Germany) SC Paderborn 07	(Wales) Cardiff City	Free
1 July 2022	Ben Dempsey	Charlton Athletic	(Scotland) Ayr United	Undisclosed
1 July 2022	Ryan East	Swindon Town	Bradford City	Free
1 July 2022	(Republic of Ireland) Festy Ebosele	Derby County	(Italy) Udinese	Undisclosed
1 July 2022	CJ Egan-Riley	Manchester City	Burnley	Free
1 July 2022	(Wales) Will Evans	(Wales) Bala Town	(Wales) Newport County	Free
1 July 2022	(Portugal) Tobias Figueiredo	Nottingham Forest	Hull City	Free
1 July 2022	(Guyana) Liam Gordon	Bolton Wanderers	Walsall	Free
1 July 2022	(France) Matteo Guendouzi	Arsenal	(France) Marseille	£9m
1 July 2022	(Norway) Erling Haaland	(Germany) Borussia Dortmund	Manchester City	£51.2m
1 July 2022	Ben Hockenhull	Brentford	Tranmere Rovers	Free
1 July 2022	James Holden	Reading	Cambridge United	Free
1 July 2022	(Australia) Jack Iredale	Cambridge United	Bolton Wanderers	Free
1 July 2022	Peter Jameson	York City	Harrogate Town	Free
1 July 2022	Sam Johnstone	West Bromwich Albion	Crystal Palace	Free
1 July 2022	(Croatia) Lovre Kalinić	Aston Villa	(Croatia) Hajduk Split	Free
1 July 2022	(France) Boubacar Kamara	(France) Marseille	Aston Villa	Free
1 July 2022	Nohan Kenneh	Leeds United	(Scotland) Hibernian	Free
1 July 2022	Otis Khan	Leyton Orient	Grimsby Town	Free
1 July 2022	Freddie Ladapo	Rotherham United	Ipswich Town	Free
1 July 2022	Harry Lewis	Southampton	Bradford City	Free
1 July 2022	Jay Lynch	Rochdale	Fleetwood Town	Free
1 July 2022	(Scotland) David Marshall	Queens Park Rangers	(Scotland) Hibernian	Free
1 July 2022	(Republic of Ireland) Oisin McEntee	Newcastle United	Walsall	Free
1 July 2022	(Republic of Ireland) Jayson Molumby	Brighton & Hove Albion	West Bromwich Albion	Undisclosed
1 July 2022	Owen Moxon	(Scotland) Annan Athletic	Carlisle United	Free
1 July 2022	(Scotland) Kal Naismith	Luton Town	Bristol City	Free
1 July 2022	(Republic of Ireland) Paudie O'Connor	Bradford City	Lincoln City	Free
1 July 2022	Richard O'Donnell	Bradford City	Rochdale	Free
1 July 2022	(Germany) Stefan Ortega	(Germany) Arminia Bielefeld	Manchester City	Free
1 July 2022	Romal Palmer	Barnsley	(Turkey) Göztepe	Free
1 July 2022	(Croatia) Ivan Perišić	(Italy) Inter Milan	Tottenham Hotspur	Free
1 July 2022	Carl Piergianni	Oldham Athletic	Stevenage	Free
1 July 2022	Matthew Platt	Barrow	Bradford City	Free
1 July 2022	(Brazil) Richarlison	Everton	Tottenham Hotspur	£60m
1 July 2022	(Scotland) Shaun Rooney	(Scotland) St Johnstone	Fleetwood Town	Free
1 July 2022	(Netherlands) Kelle Roos	Derby County	(Scotland) Aberdeen	Free
1 July 2022	Danny Rose	Northampton Town	Stevenage	Free
1 July 2022	Jack Rose	Walsall	Sutton United	Free
1 July 2022	(Saint Kitts and Nevis) Tyrese Shade	Leicester City	Swindon Town	Free
1 July 2022	Jordan Shipley	Coventry City	Shrewsbury Town	Undisclosed
1 July 2022	(France) Moussa Sissoko	Watford	(France) Nantes	Undisclosed
1 July 2022	John Swift	Reading	West Bromwich Albion	Free
1 July 2022	(Northern Ireland) Mark Sykes	Oxford United	Bristol City	Free
1 July 2022	Ollie Tanner	Lewes	(Wales) Cardiff City	Undisclosed
1 July 2022	Conor Thomas	Cheltenham Town	Crewe Alexandra	Free
1 July 2022	Kwame Thomas	(Wales) Wrexham	Sutton United	Free
1 July 2022	(Turkey) Ozan Tufan	(Turkey) Fenerbahçe	Hull City	Free
1 July 2022	(Scotland) Jamie Walker	(Scotland) Heart of Midlothian	Bradford City	Free
1 July 2022	(Northern Ireland) Conor Washington	Charlton Athletic	Rotherham United	Free
1 July 2022	(Republic of Ireland) Louie Watson	Derby County	Luton Town	Free
1 July 2022	Aaron Wildig	Morecambe	(Wales) Newport County	Free
2 July 2022	Tom Barkhuizen	Preston North End	Derby County	Free
2 July 2022	(Ivory Coast) Vakoun Issouf Bayo	(Belgium) Charleroi	Watford	Undisclosed
2 July 2022	Nathaniel Mendez-Laing	Sheffield Wednesday	Derby County	Free
2 July 2022	Akin Odimayo	Swindon Town	Northampton Town	Undisclosed
2 July 2022	James Tarkowski	Burnley	Everton	Free
2 July 2022	Joe Wildsmith	Sheffield Wednesday	Derby County	Free
3 July 2022	(France) Giulian Biancone	(France) Troyes	Nottingham Forest	£5m
4 July 2022	(Republic of Ireland) Robbie Brady	Bournemouth	Preston North End	Free
4 July 2022	(Republic of Ireland) Darragh Burns	(Republic of Ireland) St Patrick's Athletic	MK Dons	Undisclosed
4 July 2022	(Denmark) Andreas Christensen	Chelsea	(Spain) Barcelona	Free
4 July 2022	(Hungary) Dániel Csóka	AFC Wimbledon	(Hungary) Zalaegerszegi	Undisclosed
4 July 2022	Luke Freeman	Sheffield United	Luton Town	Free
4 July 2022	(Wales) Chris Gunter	Charlton Athletic	AFC Wimbledon	Free
4 July 2022	(Brazil) Gabriel Jesus	Manchester City	Arsenal	£45m
4 July 2022	John Marquis	Lincoln City	Bristol Rovers	Free
4 July 2022	D'Mani Mellor	Manchester United	Wycombe Wanderers	Free
4 July 2022	(Portugal) João Palhinha	(Portugal) Sporting	Fulham	£17m
4 July 2022	(Scotland) Brody Paterson	(Scotland) Celtic	Hartlepool United	Free
4 July 2022	Kalvin Phillips	Leeds United	Manchester City	£45m
4 July 2022	(Egypt) Trézéguet	Aston Villa	(Turkey) Trabzonspor	Undisclosed
4 July 2022	Shaun Whalley	Shrewsbury Town	Accrington Stanley	Free
4 July 2022	(Scotland) Rory Wilson	(Scotland) Rangers	Aston Villa	Free
4 July 2022	(Wales) Ben Woodburn	Liverpool	Preston North End	Free
5 July 2022	(Jamaica) Corey Addai	(Denmark) Esbjerg	Crawley Town	Free
5 July 2022	(France) Stefan Bajic	(France) Pau	Bristol City	Free
5 July 2022	(Democratic Republic of the Congo) Samuel Bastien	(Belgium) Standard Liège	Burnley	Undisclosed
5 July 2022	(Netherlands) Tyrell Malacia	(Netherlands) Feyenoord	Manchester United	£13m
5 July 2022	(Belgium) Divock Origi	Liverpool	(Italy) Milan	Free
5 July 2022	(Republic of the Congo) Brice Samba	Nottingham Forest	(France) Lens	Free
5 July 2022	Sam Sherring	Bournemouth	Northampton Town	Undisclosed
5 July 2022	Zak Swanson	Arsenal	Portsmouth	Undisclosed
5 July 2022	Jacob Wakeling	Leicester City	Swindon Town	Free
6 July 2022	(United States) Tyler Adams	(Germany) RB Leipzig	Leeds United	£20m
6 July 2022	(Bosnia and Herzegovina) Anel Ahmedhodžić	(Sweden) Malmö FF	Sheffield United	Undisclosed
6 July 2022	(Wales) James Chester	Stoke City	Derby County	Free
6 July 2022	Callum Cooke	Bradford City	Hartlepool United	Free
6 July 2022	(Scotland) Ross Doohan	(Scotland) Celtic	Tranmere Rovers	Undisclosed
6 July 2022	Akin Famewo	Norwich City	Sheffield Wednesday	Undisclosed
6 July 2022	Brandon Haunstrup	(Scotland) Kilmarnock	Cambridge United	Free
6 July 2022	(Republic of Ireland) Conor Hourihane	Aston Villa	Derby County	Free
6 July 2022	David Kasumu	MK Dons	Huddersfield Town	Undisclosed
6 July 2022	(Belgium) Roméo Lavia	Manchester City	Southampton	£10.5m
6 July 2022	Connor Mahoney	Millwall	Huddersfield Town	Free
6 July 2022	(Republic of Ireland) David McGoldrick	Sheffield United	Derby County	Free
6 July 2022	Carlton Morris	Barnsley	Luton Town	Undisclosed
6 July 2022	(France) Moussa Niakhaté	(Germany) Mainz 05	Nottingham Forest	Undisclosed
6 July 2022	(Saint Kitts and Nevis) Romaine Sawyers	West Bromwich Albion	(Wales) Cardiff City	Undisclosed
7 July 2022	Flynn Downes	(Wales) Swansea City	West Ham United	£12m
7 July 2022	(Scotland) Steven Fletcher	Stoke City	(Scotland) Dundee United	Free
7 July 2022	(Republic of Ireland) Danny Mandroiu	(Republic of Ireland) Shamrock Rovers	Lincoln City	Undisclosed
7 July 2022	(Wales) Dylan Levitt	Manchester United	(Scotland) Dundee United	Undisclosed
7 July 2022	(Colombia) Luis Sinisterra	(Netherlands) Feyenoord	Leeds United	£21m
8 July 2022	(Wales) Joe Allen	Stoke City	(Wales) Swansea City	Free
8 July 2022	(Netherlands) Steven Bergwijn	Tottenham Hotspur	(Netherlands) Ajax	£26.4m
8 July 2022	(Wales) Tom Lawrence	Derby County	(Scotland) Rangers	Free
8 July 2022	Shaun MacDonald	Torquay United	Cheltenham Town	Free
8 July 2022	(Ivory Coast) Jean Michaël Seri	Fulham	Hull City	Free
8 July 2022	Jake Taylor	Port Vale	Morecambe	Undisclosed
9 July 2022	(Nigeria) Joe Aribo	(Scotland) Rangers	Southampton	Undisclosed
9 July 2022	(Republic of the Congo) Dylan Bahamboula	Oldham Athletic	(Scotland) Livingston	Free
9 July 2022	Jack Clarke	Tottenham Hotspur	Sunderland	Undisclosed
9 July 2022	(Scotland) Aaron Hickey	(Italy) Bologna	Brentford	£17m
9 July 2022	(Iran) Allahyar Sayyadmanesh	(Turkey) Fenerbahçe	Hull City	Undisclosed
10 July 2022	Brad Halliday	Fleetwood Town	Bradford City	Free
10 July 2022	Vadaine Oliver	Unattached	Bradford City	Free
10 July 2022	Omar Richards	(Germany) Bayern Munich	Nottingham Forest	Undisclosed
11 July 2022	(Scotland) Nicky Cadden	Forest Green Rovers	Barnsley	Free
11 July 2022	(Mali) Cheick Doucouré	(France) Lens	Crystal Palace	Undisclosed
11 July 2022	Harvey Lintott	Gillingham	Northampton Town	Free
11 July 2022	(France) Mikael Mandron	Crewe Alexandra	Gillingham	Free
11 July 2022	Josh Morris	Salford City	(Scotland) Motherwell	Free
11 July 2022	(Brazil) Andreas Pereira	Manchester United	Fulham	£10m
11 July 2022	(France) Paul Pogba	Manchester United	(Italy) Juventus	Free
11 July 2022	(Republic of Ireland) Joe Rafferty	Preston North End	Portsmouth	Free
11 July 2022	(Wales) Neco Williams	Liverpool	Nottingham Forest	£17m
12 July 2022	Tom Clayton	Liverpool	Swindon Town	Undisclosed
12 July 2022	(Republic of Ireland) Nathan Collins	Burnley	Wolverhampton Wanderers	£20.5m
12 July 2022	(Republic of Ireland) Josh Cullen	(Belgium) Anderlecht	Burnley	Undisclosed
12 July 2022	Ian Henderson	Salford City	Rochdale	Free
12 July 2022	Ash Hunter	Salford City	Morecambe	Free
12 July 2022	Keane Lewis-Potter	Hull City	Brentford	Undisclosed
12 July 2022	(Albania) Rey Manaj	(Spain) Barcelona	Watford	Undisclosed
13 July 2022	(Republic of Ireland) James Collins	(Wales) Cardiff City	Derby County	Free
13 July 2022	Ronan Darcy	Bolton Wanderers	Swindon Town	Undisclosed
13 July 2022	(Republic of Ireland) Dawson Devoy	(Republic of Ireland) Bohemians	MK Dons	Undisclosed
13 July 2022	(Colombia) Óscar Estupiñán	(Portugal) Vitória de Guimarães	Hull City	Free
13 July 2022	Kyle Hudlin	Solihull Moors	Huddersfield Town	Free
13 July 2022	Kyle Jameson	Oldham Athletic	Tranmere Rovers	Free
13 July 2022	Callum Johnson	Portsmouth	(Scotland) Ross County	Free
13 July 2022	Scott Loach	Chesterfield	Derby County	Free
13 July 2022	(Republic of Ireland) Shane Long	Southampton	Reading	Free
13 July 2022	Raheem Sterling	Manchester City	Chelsea	£50m
13 July 2022	(Ukraine) Andriy Yarmolenko	West Ham United	(United Arab Emirates) Al Ain	Free
14 July 2022	Ossama Ashley	West Ham United	Colchester United	Free
14 July 2022	(Ghana) Kwaku Oduroh	Manchester City	Derby County	Free
14 July 2022	John Ruddy	Wolverhampton Wanderers	Birmingham City	Free
14 July 2022	(Albania) Thomas Strakosha	(Italy) Lazio	Brentford	Free
14 July 2022	Josh Umerah	Wealdstone	Hartlepool United	Undisclosed
15 July 2022	(Nigeria) Victor Adeboyejo	Barnsley	Burton Albion	Free
15 July 2022	Tomi Adeloye	(Scotland) Ayr United	Swindon Town	Free
15 July 2022	Aji Alese	West Ham United	Sunderland	Undisclosed
15 July 2022	Cheye Alexander	AFC Wimbledon	Gillingham	Free
15 July 2022	Calum Butcher	(Scotland) Dundee United	Burton Albion	Free
15 July 2022	(Denmark) Christian Eriksen	Brentford	Manchester United	Free
15 July 2022	Jordan Green	Barnsley	Gillingham	Free
15 July 2022	Kieran Green	FC Halifax Town	Grimsby Town	Undisclosed
15 July 2022	(Wales) Wayne Hennessey	Burnley	Nottingham Forest	Undisclosed
15 July 2022	Remeao Hutton	Barrow	Swindon Town	Undisclosed
15 July 2022	Bradley Johnson	Blackburn Rovers	MK Dons	Free
15 July 2022	(The Gambia) Saidou Khan	Chesterfield	Swindon Town	Undisclosed
15 July 2022	Bryn Morris	Burton Albion	Grimsby Town	Free
15 July 2022	(Japan) Yuta Nakayama	(Netherlands) PEC Zwolle	Huddersfield Town	Free
15 July 2022	(Brazil) Raphinha	Leeds United	(Spain) Barcelona	£55m
15 July 2022	Jack Rudoni	AFC Wimbledon	Huddersfield Town	Undisclosed
15 July 2022	(Brazil) Gabriel Sara	(Brazil) São Paulo	Norwich City	Undisclosed
16 July 2022	Tope Fadahunsi	Loughborough University	Sutton United	Free
16 July 2022	(Malta) Luke Gambin	(Malta) Ħamrun Spartans	Sutton United	Free
16 July 2022	(Senegal) Kalidou Koulibaly	(Italy) Napoli	Chelsea	Undisclosed
16 July 2022	James Norwood	Ipswich Town	Barnsley	Free
16 July 2022	Matt Ridley	Whitby Town	Sutton United	Free
16 July 2022	Korey Smith	(Wales) Swansea City	Derby County	Free
17 July 2022	(Costa Rica) Brandon Aguilera	(Costa Rica) Alajuelense	Nottingham Forest	Undisclosed
17 July 2022	Adam Long	Wigan Athletic	Doncaster Rovers	Undisclosed
18 July 2022	Josh Davison	Charlton Athletic	AFC Wimbledon	Undisclosed
18 July 2022	Zeno Ibsen Rossi	Bournemouth	Cambridge United	Undisclosed
18 July 2022	(Wales) Ryan Leak	Burton Albion	Salford City	Undisclosed
18 July 2022	Jack Payne	Swindon Town	Charlton Athletic	Free
18 July 2022	(Turkey) Okay Yokuşlu	(Spain) Celta Vigo	West Bromwich Albion	Free
18 July 2022	(Norway) Leo Skiri Østigård	Brighton & Hove Albion	(Italy) Napoli	Undisclosed
19 July 2022	Ben Davies	Liverpool	(Scotland) Rangers	£4m
19 July 2022	(Wales) Jacob Jones	(Wales) Swansea City	Forest Green Rovers	Free
19 July 2022	Angus MacDonald	Rotherham United	Swindon Town	Free
19 July 2022	(Morocco) Adam Masina	Watford	(Italy) Udinese	Undisclosed
19 July 2022	(Nigeria) Josh Oluwayemi	Tottenham Hotspur	Portsmouth	Free
19 July 2022	Sonny Perkins	West Ham United	Leeds United	Free
19 July 2022	Tyrese Sinclair	Mansfield Town	Rochdale	Free
19 July 2022	Djed Spence	Middlesbrough	Tottenham Hotspur	£20m
20 July 2022	Jayden Davis	Millwall	Crawley Town	Free
20 July 2022	Sam Hutchinson	Sheffield Wednesday	Reading	Free
20 July 2022	(Namibia) Ryan Nyambe	Blackburn Rovers	Wigan Athletic	Free
20 July 2022	Lewis O'Brien	Huddersfield Town	Nottingham Forest	Undisclosed
20 July 2022	(Turkey) Doğukan Sinik	(Turkey) Antalyaspor	Hull City	Undisclosed
20 July 2022	Moe Shubbar	Cheshunt	Crawley Town	Free
20 July 2022	(Northern Ireland) Eoin Toal	(Northern Ireland) Derry City	Bolton Wanderers	Undisclosed
20 July 2022	Harry Toffolo	Huddersfield Town	Nottingham Forest	Undisclosed
20 July 2022	Ben Wells	Welling United	Crawley Town	Free
20 July 2022	Max Wright	Grimsby Town	Harrogate Town	Free
20 July 2022	(Germany) Christoph Zimmermann	Norwich City	(Germany) SV Darmstadt 98	Undisclosed
21 July 2022	Tyreeq Bakinson	Bristol City	Sheffield Wednesday	Undisclosed
21 July 2022	Colby Bishop	Accrington Stanley	Portsmouth	Undisclosed
21 July 2022	Callum Brittain	Barnsley	Blackburn Rovers	Undisclosed
21 July 2022	Ryan Jackson	Gillingham	Cheltenham Town	Free
21 July 2022	Jesse Lingard	Manchester United	Nottingham Forest	Free
21 July 2022	(Scotland) James Maxwell	(Scotland) Rangers	Doncaster Rovers	Free
21 July 2022	(Republic of Ireland) Edward McGinty	(Republic of Ireland) Sligo Rovers	Oxford United	Undisclosed
21 July 2022	(Republic of Ireland) Promise Omochere	(Republic of Ireland) Bohemians	Fleetwood Town	Undisclosed
21 July 2022	Ben Whitfield	Stockport County	Barrow	Free
22 July 2022	Dwight Gayle	Newcastle United	Stoke City	Undisclosed
22 July 2022	Kyle Hurst	Birmingham City	Doncaster Rovers	Free
22 July 2022	Brandon Mason	MK Dons	Crawley Town	Free
22 July 2022	Ben Mee	Burnley	Brentford	Free
22 July 2022	(Kosovo) Arijanet Muric	Manchester City	Burnley	Undisclosed
22 July 2022	Mikael Ndjoli	(United States) Virginia Beach City	Hartlepool United	Free
22 July 2022	(Angola) Elliot Simões	(France) Nancy	Salford City	Undisclosed
22 July 2022	Lee Tomlin	Walsall	Doncaster Rovers	Free
22 July 2022	(Suriname) Yanic Wildschut	(Bulgaria) CSKA Sofia	Oxford United	Undisclosed
22 July 2022	(Ukraine) Oleksandr Zinchenko	Manchester City	Arsenal	£30m
23 July 2022	Shamal George	Colchester United	(Scotland) Livingston	Undisclosed
23 July 2022	(Ghana) Benjamin Tetteh	(Turkey) Yeni Malatyaspor	Hull City	Free
25 July 2022	Leif Davis	Leeds United	Ipswich Town	Undisclosed
25 July 2022	(France) Sékou Mara	(France) Bordeaux	Southampton	Undisclosed
25 July 2022	Gavin Massey	Wigan Athletic	Port Vale	Free
25 July 2022	Callum Roberts	Notts County	(Scotland) Aberdeen	Undisclosed
25 July 2022	Dominic Thompson	Brentford	Blackpool	Undisclosed
25 July 2022	(Spain) Alhagi Touray Sisay	(Wales) Haverfordwest County	Accrington Stanley	Undisclosed
26 July 2022	Timmy Abraham	Fulham	Walsall	Free
26 July 2022	(Netherlands) Derek Agyakwa	Watford	Port Vale	Free
26 July 2022	Jamal Blackman	Huddersfield	Exeter City	Free
26 July 2022	Will Forrester	Stoke City	Port Vale	Free
26 July 2022	Michael Morrison	Reading	Portsmouth	Free
26 July 2022	Josh Murphy	(Wales) Cardiff City	Oxford United	Free
26 July 2022	Richard Nartey	Burnley	Salford City	Free
26 July 2022	(Italy) Gianluca Scamacca	(Italy) Sassuolo	West Ham United	£30.5m
26 July 2022	Jordan Turnbull	Salford City	Tranmere Rovers	Free
27 July 2022	(Argentina) Lisandro Martínez	(Netherlands) Ajax	Manchester United	£57m
27 July 2022	(Switzerland) Kevin Mbabu	(Germany) VfL Wolfsburg	Fulham	£6.4m
27 July 2022	(United States) Chris Richards	(Germany) Bayern Munich	Crystal Palace	£8.5m
27 July 2022	Tommy Smith	Stoke City	Middlesbrough	Free
28 July 2022	Jack Degruchy	York City	Doncaster Rovers	Free
28 July 2022	(Spain) Kiko Femenía	Watford	(Spain) Villarreal	Undisclosed
28 July 2022	(Finland) Marcus Forss	Brentford	Middlesbrough	Undisclosed
28 July 2022	(Spain) Enock Lusiama	Daisy Hill	Accrington Stanley	Free
28 July 2022	Tyler Magloire	Blackburn Rovers	Northampton Town	Undisclosed
28 July 2022	Dwight McNeil	Burnley	Everton	£20m
28 July 2022	(Sweden) Joel Mumbongo	Burnley	Tranmere Rovers	Free
28 July 2022	Lee Peltier	Middlesbrough	Rotherham United	Free
28 July 2022	(Brazil) Vitinho	(Belgium) Cercle Brugge	Burnley	Undisclosed
29 July 2022	(Republic of Ireland) Jamie Devitt	Barrow	Carlisle United	Free
29 July 2022	(Spain) Mario Gaspar	(Spain) Villarreal	Watford	Free
29 July 2022	Nesta Guinness-Walker	AFC Wimbledon	Reading	Free
29 July 2022	(Northern Ireland) Rory Holden	Walsall	Port Vale	Undisclosed
29 July 2022	Fejiri Okenabirhie	Doncaster Rovers	Cambridge United	Free
29 July 2022	Lewis Walker	(Italy) Athletic Carpi	Gillingham	Free
30 July 2022	(Republic of Ireland) Michael Kelly	(Republic of Ireland) Bray Wanderers	Carlisle United	Undisclosed
31 July 2022	(Belgium) Orel Mangala	(Germany) VfB Stuttgart	Nottingham Forest	£12.7m
1 August 2022	Marcus Tavernier	Middlesbrough	Bournemouth	£10m
1 August 2022	(Republic of Ireland) Sammie Szmodics	Peterborough United	Blackburn Rovers	Undisclosed
2 August 2022	Jayden Harris	Aldershot Town	Carlisle United	Undisclosed
2 August 2022	(Germany) Bernd Leno	Arsenal	Fulham	£8m
2 August 2022	John McAtee	Grimsby Town	Luton Town	Undisclosed
2 August 2022	(Chile) Marcelino Núñez	(Chile) Universidad Católica	Norwich City	Undisclosed
2 August 2022	Benni Smales-Braithwaite	Southampton	Barrow	Free
3 August 2022	(Republic of Ireland) Kieran O'Hara	Fleetwood Town	Colchester United	Free
3 August 2022	(Denmark) Kasper Schmeichel	Leicester City	(France) Nice	Undisclosed
3 August 2022	(United States) Gabriel Slonina	(United States) Chicago Fire	Chelsea	£12m
3 August 2022	Connor Wickham	MK Dons	Forest Green Rovers	Free
4 August 2022	(Belgium) Manuel Benson	(Belgium) Royal Antwerp	Burnley	Undisclosed
4 August 2022	Nathan Byrne	Derby County	(United States) Charlotte	Undisclosed
4 August 2022	Carney Chukwuemeka	Aston Villa	Chelsea	£20m
4 August 2022	Anthony Hartigan	AFC Wimbledon	Mansfield Town	Undisclosed
4 August 2022	Myles Kenlock	Ipswich Town	Barrow	Undisclosed
4 August 2022	Tom Knowles	Yeovil Town	Walsall	Undisclosed
4 August 2022	Shayden Morris	Fleetwood Town	(Scotland) Aberdeen	Undisclosed
4 August 2022	Sean Robertson	Crystal Palace	Forest Green Rovers	Free
4 August 2022	(France) Mohamed Sylla	Aldershot Town	Hartlepool United	Free
4 August 2022	Connal Trueman	Birmingham City	Millwall	Free
5 August 2022	(Belgium) Christian Benteke	Crystal Palace	(United States) D.C. United	Undisclosed
5 August 2022	(Ivory Coast) Maxwel Cornet	Burnley	West Ham United	£17.5m
5 August 2022	(Spain) Marc Cucurella	Brighton & Hove Albion	Chelsea	£60m
5 August 2022	(United States) Matt Miazga	Chelsea	(United States) FC Cincinnati	Undisclosed
6 August 2022	(Scotland) Lewis Gordon	Brentford	Bristol Rovers	Free
6 August 2022	(Wales) Tom Lowery	Crewe Alexandra	Portsmouth	Free
7 August 2022	(Brazil) Neto	(Spain) Barcelona	Bournemouth	Free
8 August 2022	(Portugal) Baba Fernandes	Nottingham Forest	Accrington Stanley	Free
8 August 2022	(Portugal) Gonçalo Guedes	(Spain) Valencia	Wolverhampton Wanderers	£27.5m
8 August 2022	(Zimbabwe) David Moyo	(Scotland) Hamilton Academical	Barrow	Free
8 August 2022	(Argentina) Marcos Senesi	(Netherlands) Feyenoord	Bournemouth	Undisclosed
9 August 2022	Jacob Bedeau	Burnley	Morecambe	Undisclosed
9 August 2022	(Republic of Ireland) Will Ferry	Southampton	Cheltenham Town	Undisclosed
9 August 2022	Jack Simpson	(Scotland) Rangers	(Wales) Cardiff City	Undisclosed
9 August 2022	(France) Thimothee Lo-Tutala	Tottenham Hotspur	Hull City	Free
9 August 2022	(Belgium) Amadou Onana	(France) Lille	Everton	£33m
9 August 2022	(Germany) Timo Werner	Chelsea	(Germany) RB Leipzig	£25m
10 August 2022	(Denmark) Mikkel Damsgaard	(Italy) Sampdoria	Brentford	Undisclosed
10 August 2022	(France) Issa Diop	West Ham United	Fulham	£15m
10 August 2022	(United States) Matthew Hoppe	(Spain) Mallorca	Middlesbrough	Undisclosed
10 August 2022	Paul Huntington	Preston North End	Carlisle United	Free
10 August 2022	(Republic of Ireland) Richard Keogh	Ipswich Town	Blackpool	Undisclosed
11 August 2022	(Wales) Ellis Harrison	Fleetwood Town	Port Vale	Undisclosed
11 August 2022	Alfie Mawson	Fulham	Wycombe Wanderers	Free
12 August 2022	Wes McDonald	Morecambe	Hartlepool United	Free
12 August 2022	(Wales) Christian Norton	Stoke City	Cheltenham Town	Free
12 August 2022	Alex Smithies	(Wales) Cardiff City	Leicester City	Free
12 August 2022	(Germany) Andreas Voglsammer	(Germany) Union Berlin	Millwall	Undisclosed
13 August 2022	(Nigeria) Emmanuel Dennis	Watford	Nottingham Forest	£20m
13 August 2022	Uche Ikpeazu	Middlesbrough	(Turkey) Konyaspor	Undisclosed
13 August 2022	(Senegal) Cheikhou Kouyaté	Crystal Palace	Nottingham Forest	Free
13 August 2022	Alex Oxborough	Norwich City	(Scotland) Motherwell	Free
13 August 2022	(Brazil) Samir	Watford	(Mexico) Tigres	Undisclosed
14 August 2022	(Switzerland) Remo Freuler	(Italy) Atalanta	Nottingham Forest	Undisclosed
15 August 2022	Connor Malley	Middlesbrough	Rochdale	Free
16 August 2022	(Ecuador) Pervis Estupiñán	(Spain) Villarreal	Brighton & Hove Albion	Undisclosed
16 August 2022	(Spain) Sergio Gómez	(Belgium) Anderlecht	Manchester City	£11m
16 August 2022	(Italy) Destiny Udogie	(Italy) Udinese	Tottenham Hotspur	£15m
17 August 2022	(Germany) Thilo Kehrer	(France) Paris Saint-Germain	West Ham United	£10.1m
18 August 2022	Charles Hagan	Sheffield Wednesday	Wycombe Wanderers	Free
18 August 2022	(Portugal) Matheus Nunes	(Portugal) Sporting	Wolverhampton Wanderers	£38m
18 August 2022	(Poland) Max Stryjek	(Scotland) Livingston	Wycombe Wanderers	Undisclosed
18 August 2022	Ryan Woods	Birmingham City	Hull City	Undisclosed
19 August 2022	David Bremang	Barnsley	Crawley Town	Undisclosed
19 August 2022	(North Macedonia) Darko Churlinov	(Germany) VfB Stuttgart	Burnley	Undisclosed
19 August 2022	Morgan Gibbs-White	Wolverhampton Wanderers	Nottingham Forest	£25m
22 August 2022	(Brazil) Casemiro	(Spain) Real Madrid	Manchester United	£70m
22 August 2022	Mallik Wilks	Hull City	Sheffield Wednesday	Undisclosed
22 August 2022	(Poland) Paweł Żuk	(Poland) Ruch Chorzów	Barrow	Free
23 August 2022	(Ivory Coast) Hassane Kamara	Watford	(Italy) Udinese	Undisclosed
23 August 2022	(Italy) Emerson Palmieri	Chelsea	West Ham United	£15m
24 August 2022	Luke McCormick	AFC Wimbledon	Bristol Rovers	Undisclosed
24 August 2022	Harry Pell	Accrington Stanley	AFC Wimbledon	Undisclosed
25 August 2022	(Costa Rica) Jewison Bennette	(Costa Rica) Herediano	Sunderland	Undisclosed
25 August 2022	Matthew Clarke	Brighton & Hove Albion	Middlesbrough	Undisclosed
26 August 2022	(Nigeria) Leon Balogun	(Scotland) Rangers	Queens Park Rangers	Free
26 August 2022	(Republic of Ireland) Cyrus Christie	Fulham	Hull City	Free
26 August 2022	(Scotland) Michael Devlin	(Scotland) Aberdeen	Fleetwood Town	Free
26 August 2022	(Italy) Denis Franchi	(France) Paris Saint-Germain	Burnley	Free
26 August 2022	(Sweden) Alexander Isak	(Spain) Real Sociedad	Newcastle United	£60m
26 August 2022	(France) Neal Maupay	Brighton & Hove Albion	Everton	Undisclosed
26 August 2022	Ephron Mason-Clark	Barnet	Peterborough United	Undisclosed
26 August 2022	(France) Naby Sarr	Huddersfield Town	Reading	Free
26 August 2022	(South Korea) Hwang Ui-jo	(France) Bordeaux	Nottingham Forest	Undisclosed
27 August 2022	(Netherlands) Sylla Sow	Sheffield Wednesday	(Netherlands) De Graafschap	Undisclosed
28 August 2022	(Scotland) Dominic Hyam	Coventry City	Blackburn Rovers	Undisclosed
29 August 2022	(Republic of Ireland) Andy Lyons	(Republic of Ireland) Shamrock Rovers	Blackpool	Undisclosed
29 August 2022	(Brazil) Lucas Paquetá	(France) Lyon	West Ham United	£36.5m
29 August 2022	(Grenada) Aaron Pierre	Shrewsbury Town	Sutton United	Free
30 August 2022	(Belgium) Anass Zaroury	(Belgium) Charleroi	Burnley	Undisclosed
31 August 2022	(France) Abdoullah Ba	(France) Le Havre	Sunderland	Undisclosed
31 August 2022	(Netherlands) Anwar El Ghazi	Aston Villa	(Netherlands) PSV Eindhoven	Undisclosed
31 August 2022	(France) Wesley Fofana	Leicester City	Chelsea	£70m
31 August 2022	(Austria) Saša Kalajdžić	(Germany) VfB Stuttgart	Wolverhampton Wanderers	£15m
31 August 2022	Brandon Thomas-Asante	Salford City	West Bromwich Albion	Undisclosed
1 September 2022	(Morocco) Gassan Ahadme	Burton Albion	Ipswich Town	Undisclosed
1 September 2022	(Switzerland) Manuel Akanji	(Germany) Borussia Dortmund	Manchester City	Undisclosed
1 September 2022	(Netherlands) Djavan Anderson	(Italy) Lazio	Oxford United	Undisclosed
1 September 2022	Dior Angus	(Wales) Wrexham	Harrogate Town	Undisclosed
1 September 2022	(Brazil) Antony	(Netherlands) Ajax	Manchester United	£82m
1 September 2022	(Gabon) Pierre-Emerick Aubameyang	(Spain) Barcelona	Chelsea	£12m
1 September 2022	Odin Bailey	Birmingham City	Salford City	Undisclosed
1 September 2022	(Ivory Coast) Willy Boly	Wolverhampton Wanderers	Nottingham Forest	Undisclosed
1 September 2022	Josh Bowler	Blackpool	Nottingham Forest	£4m
1 September 2022	(Republic of Ireland) Conor Brann	(Republic of Ireland) Galway United	Swindon Town	Free
1 September 2022	(Wales) Ryan Broom	Peterborough	Cheltenham Town	Undisclosed
1 September 2022	(Croatia) Duje Ćaleta-Car	(France) Marseille	Southampton	Undisclosed
1 September 2022	(Guinea-Bissau) Panutche Camará	Plymouth Argyle	Ipswich Town	Undisclosed
1 September 2022	(Netherlands) Tahith Chong	Manchester United	Birmingham City	Undisclosed
1 September 2022	(Belgium) Leander Dendoncker	Wolverhampton Wanderers	Aston Villa	£13m
1 September 2022	Samuel Edozie	Manchester City	Southampton	£10m
1 September 2022	Zak Emmerson	Brighton & Hove Albion	Blackpool	Undisclosed
1 September 2022	(Belgium) Wout Faes	(France) Reims	Leicester City	Undisclosed
1 September 2022	Sam Folarin	Middlesbrough	Harrogate Town	Free
1 September 2022	James Garner	Manchester United	Everton	£9m
1 September 2022	(Scotland) Billy Gilmour	Chelsea	Brighton & Hove Albion	£7.5m
1 September 2022	(Italy) Wilfried Gnonto	(Switzerland) Zürich	Leeds United	Undisclosed
1 September 2022	(Senegal) Idrissa Gueye	(France) Paris Saint-Germain	Everton	Undisclosed
1 September 2022	(Poland) Michał Helik	Barnsley	Huddersfield Town	Undisclosed
1 September 2022	Rushian Hepburn-Murphy	Unattached	Swindon Town	Free
1 September 2022	Alex Hunt	Sheffield Wednesday	Grimsby Town	Undisclosed
1 September 2022	Martin Kelly	Crystal Palace	West Bromwich Albion	Free
1 September 2022	(Spain) Juan Larios	Manchester City	Southampton	£6m
1 September 2022	Marcel Lavinier	Tottenham Hotspur	Swindon Town	Free
1 September 2022	Robbie McKenzie	Unattached	Gillingham	Free
1 September 2022	Harry McKirdy	Swindon Town	(Scotland) Hibernian	Undisclosed
1 September 2022	James Olayinka	Arsenal	Cheltenham Town	Free
1 September 2022	Adam Phillips	Burnley	Barnsley	Undisclosed
1 September 2022	Morgan Roberts	Banbury United	Swindon Town	Undisclosed
1 September 2022	(Republic of Ireland) Callum Robinson	West Bromwich Albion	(Wales) Cardiff City	Undisclosed
1 September 2022	(Spain) Oriol Romeu	Southampton	(Spain) Girona	Undisclosed
1 September 2022	(Republic of Ireland) Anthony Scully	Lincoln City	Wigan Athletic	Undisclosed
1 September 2022	Tyreece Simpson	Ipswich Town	Huddersfield Town	Undisclosed
1 September 2022	Bailey Sloane	(Northern Ireland) Clitheroe	Accrington Stanley	Undisclosed
1 September 2022	(Mali) Adama Traoré	(Turkey) Hatayspor	Hull City	Free
1 September 2022	(Brazil) Carlos Vinícius	(Portugal) Benfica	Fulham	Undisclosed
1 September 2022	Lewis Ward	Swindon Town	Sutton United	Undisclosed
1 September 2022	(Brazil) Willian	(Brazil) Corinthians	Fulham	Free
1 September 2022	Callum Wright	Leicester City	Blackpool	Undisclosed

== Loans ==
Start date	End date	Name	Moving from	Moving to
1 May 2022	8 May 2022	Matt Ingram	Hull City	Luton Town
5 May 2022	31 December 2022	(United States) Indiana Vassilev	Aston Villa	(United States) Inter Miami
2 June 2022	31 May 2023	Kian Harratt	Huddersfield Town	Bradford City
3 June 2022	31 May 2023	Chanka Zimba	(Wales) Cardiff City	(Wales) Newport County
15 June 2022	31 May 2023	Liam Bennett	Cambridge United	Walsall
15 June 2022	31 May 2023	(Scotland) Dean Campbell	(Scotland) Aberdeen	Stevenage
15 June 2022	31 May 2023	James Trafford	Manchester City	Bolton Wanderers
17 June 2022	31 May 2023	Harvey Cartwright	Hull City	Peterborough United
17 June 2022	31 May 2023	(Tunisia) Mohamed Dräger	Nottingham Forest	(Switzerland) Luzern
18 June 2022	31 May 2023	(Finland) Lucas Bergström	Chelsea	Peterborough United
18 June 2022	31 May 2023	(Bosnia and Herzegovina) Mario Vrančić	Stoke City	(Croatia) Rijeka
19 June 2022	31 May 2023	Joe Lumley	Middlesbrough	Reading
20 June 2022	31 May 2023	Harry Clarke	Arsenal	Stoke City
21 June 2022	31 May 2023	Josh Austerfield	Huddersfield Town	Harrogate Town
21 June 2022	31 May 2023	(Northern Ireland) Conor Bradley	Liverpool	Bolton Wanderers
21 June 2022	31 May 2023	Romoney Crichlow	Huddersfield Town	Bradford City
21 June 2022	31 May 2023	Jaheim Headley	Huddersfield Town	Harrogate Town
22 June 2022	31 May 2023	Sonny Hilton	Fulham	Carlisle United
22 June 2022	31 May 2023	Tyreece John-Jules	Arsenal	Ipswich Town
22 June 2022	31 May 2023	Adam Lewis	Liverpool	(Wales) Newport County
23 June 2022	31 May 2023	Taye Ashby-Hammond	Fulham	Stevenage
23 June 2022	31 May 2023	Sol Brynn	Middlesbrough	Swindon Town
23 June 2022	31 May 2023	Ryan Giles	Wolverhampton Wanderers	Middlesbrough
23 June 2022	31 May 2023	(Northern Ireland) Sam McClelland	Chelsea	Barrow
23 June 2022	31 May 2023	(Australia) Caleb Watts	Southampton	Morecambe
24 June 2022	31 May 2023	Matthew Sorinola	(Belgium) Union SG	(Wales) Swansea City
27 June 2022	31 May 2023	Harry Boyes	Sheffield United	Forest Green Rovers
27 June 2022	31 May 2023	(France) Julien Dacosta	Coventry City	Shrewsbury Town
27 June 2022	31 May 2023	Matty Daly	Huddersfield Town	Harrogate Town
27 June 2022	31 May 2023	Tashan Oakley-Boothe	Stoke City	Lincoln City
27 June 2022	31 May 2023	(Belgium) Kazeem Olaigbe	Southampton	(Scotland) Ross County
28 June 2022	31 May 2023	(Denmark) Lukas Jensen	Burnley	Accrington Stanley
28 June 2022	31 May 2023	(Australia) Ashley Maynard-Brewer	Charlton Athletic	Gillingham
29 June 2022	31 May 2023	(Belgium) Romelu Lukaku	Chelsea	(Italy) Inter Milan
1 July 2022	31 May 2023	(Republic of Ireland) Ciaran Brennan	Sheffield Wednesday	Swindon Town
1 July 2022	31 May 2023	Taylor Harwood-Bellis	Manchester City	Burnley
1 July 2022	31 May 2023	Douglas James-Taylor	Stoke City	Walsall
2 July 2022	31 May 2023	Dean Henderson	Manchester United	Nottingham Forest
2 July 2022	31 May 2023	(United States) Ethan Horvath	Nottingham Forest	Luton Town
2 July 2022	31 May 2023	(Republic of Ireland) Gavin Kilkenny	Bournemouth	Stoke City
4 July 2022	31 May 2023	Ben Barclay	Stockport County	Carlisle United
4 July 2022	31 May 2023	Nathan Baxter	Chelsea	Hull City
4 July 2022	31 May 2023	Charlie Cresswell	Leeds United	Millwall
4 July 2022	31 May 2023	(Republic of Ireland) Tommy Doyle	Manchester City	Sheffield United
4 July 2022	31 May 2023	(Czech Republic) Vítězslav Jaroš	Liverpool	Stockport County
4 July 2022	31 May 2023	Taylor Moore	Bristol City	Shrewsbury Town
4 July 2022	31 May 2023	Dan Nlundulu	Southampton	Cheltenham Town
5 July 2022	31 May 2023	Oliver Casey	Blackpool	Forest Green Rovers
5 July 2022	31 May 2023	Dion Sanderson	Wolverhampton Wanderers	Birmingham City
5 July 2022	31 May 2023	Steven Sessegnon	Fulham	Charlton Athletic
5 July 2022	31 May 2023	(Croatia) Ivan Šunjić	Birmingham City	(Germany) Hertha BSC
5 July 2022	31 May 2023	(Netherlands) Wout Weghorst	Burnley	(Turkey) Beşiktaş
6 July 2022	31 May 2023	(Poland) Przemysław Płacheta	Norwich City	Birmingham City
6 July 2022	31 May 2023	(Wales) Tyler Roberts	Leeds United	Queens Park Rangers
8 July 2022	31 May 2023	Josh Andrews	Birmingham City	Doncaster Rovers
8 July 2022	31 May 2023	(Indonesia) Elkan Baggott	Ipswich Town	Gillingham
8 July 2022	31 May 2023	Tyrese Fornah	Nottingham Forest	Reading
8 July 2022	31 May 2023	(France) Clément Lenglet	(Spain) Barcelona	Tottenham Hotspur
8 July 2022	31 May 2023	(Republic of Ireland) Lewis Richards	Wolverhampton Wanderers	Harrogate Town
8 July 2022	31 May 2023	Carl Rushworth	Brighton & Hove Albion	Lincoln City
9 July 2022	31 May 2023	Jamie Cumming	Chelsea	MK Dons
9 July 2022	31 May 2023	Josh Neufville	Luton Town	Sutton United
9 July 2022	31 May 2023	Haydon Roberts	Brighton & Hove Albion	Derby County
9 July 2022	31 May 2023	Will Swan	Nottingham Forest	Mansfield Town
11 July 2022	31 May 2023	(Sweden) Ludwig Augustinsson	(Spain) Sevilla	Aston Villa
11 July 2022	31 May 2023	Finn Azaz	Aston Villa	Plymouth Argyle
11 July 2022	31 May 2023	(Wales) Owen Beck	Liverpool	(Portugal) Famalicão
11 July 2022	31 May 2023	(Scotland) Flynn Clarke	Norwich City	Walsall
11 July 2022	31 May 2023	Callum Doyle	Manchester City	Coventry City
11 July 2022	31 May 2023	Saxon Earley	Norwich City	Stevenage
11 July 2022	31 May 2023	(Finland) Viljami Sinisalo	Aston Villa	Burton Albion
12 July 2022	31 May 2023	Louie Barry	Aston Villa	MK Dons
12 July 2022	31 May 2023	(Scotland) Kieron Bowie	Fulham	Northampton Town
12 July 2022	31 May 2023	(Republic of Ireland) Jeff Hendrick	Newcastle United	Reading
12 July 2022	31 May 2023	Harrison Neal	Sheffield United	Barrow
12 July 2022	31 May 2023	Christy Pym	Peterborough United	Mansfield Town
13 July 2022	31 May 2023	Ryan Astley	Everton	Accrington Stanley
13 July 2022	31 May 2023	(Republic of Ireland) Ciaran Clark	Newcastle United	Sheffield United
13 July 2022	31 May 2023	Jonathan Panzo	Nottingham Forest	Coventry City
14 July 2022	31 May 2023	Fin Back	Nottingham Forest	Carlisle United
14 July 2022	31 May 2023	(Portugal) Quévin Castro	West Bromwich Albion	Burton Albion
14 July 2022	31 May 2023	Josh Griffiths	West Bromwich Albion	Portsmouth
14 July 2022	31 May 2023	Bali Mumba	Norwich City	Plymouth Argyle
14 July 2022	31 May 2023	(Argentina) Martín Payero	Middlesbrough	(Argentina) Boca Juniors
14 July 2022	31 May 2023	Taylor Perry	Wolverhampton Wanderers	Cheltenham Town
15 July 2022	31 May 2023	Kyle Hudlin	Huddersfield Town	AFC Wimbledon
15 July 2022	31 May 2023	(Ivory Coast) Cédric Kipré	West Bromwich Albion	(Wales) Cardiff City
15 July 2022	31 May 2023	(Netherlands) Ian Maatsen	Chelsea	Burnley
15 July 2022	31 May 2023	Femi Seriki	Sheffield United	Rochdale
15 July 2022	31 May 2023	(United States) Auston Trusty	Arsenal	Birmingham City
16 July 2022	31 May 2023	(Scotland) Lewis Fiorini	Manchester City	Blackpool
16 July 2022	31 May 2023	Riley Harbottle	Nottingham Forest	Mansfield Town
17 July 2022	31 December 2022	(Costa Rica) Brandon Aguilera	Nottingham Forest	(Costa Rica) Guanacasteca
17 July 2022	31 May 2023	Jarrad Branthwaite	Everton	(Netherlands) PSV
18 July 2022	31 May 2023	Ryan Law	Plymouth Argyle	Gillingham
18 July 2022	31 May 2023	Paris Maghoma	Brentford	AFC Wimbledon
18 July 2022	31 May 2023	(Wales) Rollin Menayese	Walsall	Hartlepool United
19 July 2022	31 May 2023	(Northern Ireland) Jordan Jones	Wigan Athletic	(Scotland) Kilmarnock
19 July 2022	31 May 2023	Jamie Shackleton	Leeds United	Millwall
19 July 2022	31 May 2023	(Portugal) Fábio Silva	Wolverhampton Wanderers	(Belgium) Anderlecht
19 July 2022	31 May 2023	(United States) Zack Steffen	Manchester City	Middlesbrough
19 July 2022	31 May 2023	Rhys Williams	Liverpool	Blackpool
20 July 2022	31 May 2023	(Scotland) Jack Hamilton	(Scotland) Livingston	Hartlepool United
20 July 2022	31 May 2023	Morgan Whittaker	(Wales) Swansea City	Plymouth Argyle
21 July 2022	31 December 2022	Brendan Kiernan	Walsall	Grimsby Town
21 July 2022	31 May 2023	(Scotland) Luke Robinson	Wigan Athletic	Tranmere Rovers
22 July 2022	31 May 2023	Tino Anjorin	Chelsea	Huddersfield Town
22 July 2022	31 December 2022	(Australia) Lachlan Brook	Brentford	Crewe Alexandra
22 July 2022	31 May 2023	Henry Lawrence	Chelsea	MK Dons
22 July 2022	31 May 2023	Taylor Richards	Brighton & Hove Albion	Queens Park Rangers
22 July 2022	31 May 2023	(Northern Ireland) Luke Southwood	Reading	Cheltenham Town
22 July 2022	31 May 2023	Caleb Taylor	West Bromwich Albion	Cheltenham Town
22 July 2022	31 May 2023	James Taylor	Bristol City	Cheltenham Town
22 July 2022	31 May 2023	(Greece) Christos Tzolis	Norwich City	(Netherlands) FC Twente
22 July 2022	31 May 2023	(Brazil) Wesley	Aston Villa	(Spain) Levante
23 July 2022	31 May 2023	Grant Hall	Middlesbrough	Rotherham United
23 July 2022	31 December 2022	Danny Johnson	Mansfield Town	Walsall
23 July 2022	31 May 2023	(Republic of Ireland) Will Smallbone	Southampton	Stoke City
25 July 2022	31 May 2023	(United States) Charlie Kelman	Queens Park Rangers	Leyton Orient
25 July 2022	31 May 2023	(Scotland) Marc Leonard	Brighton & Hove Albion	Northampton Town
25 July 2022	31 May 2023	(Republic of Ireland) Troy Parrott	Tottenham Hotspur	Preston North End
25 July 2022	31 May 2023	Jensen Weir	Brighton & Hove Albion	Morecambe
26 July 2022	31 May 2023	(South Africa) Kegs Chauke	Southampton	Exeter City
26 July 2022	31 May 2023	Hayden Coulson	Middlesbrough	(Scotland) Aberdeen
26 July 2022	31 May 2023	(Spain) Álvaro Fernández	Manchester United	Preston North End
26 July 2022	31 May 2023	(Germany) Reda Khadra	Brighton & Hove Albion	Sheffield United
26 July 2022	31 January 2023	(South Africa) Khanya Leshabela	Leicester City	Crewe Alexandra
26 July 2022	31 May 2023	Jaden Philogene	Aston Villa	(Wales) Cardiff City
27 July 2022	31 May 2023	(Republic of Ireland) Tayo Adaramola	Crystal Palace	Coventry City
27 July 2022	31 May 2023	Remi Matthews	Crystal Palace	(Scotland) St Johnstone
27 July 2022	31 May 2023	Alex Mitchell	Millwall	(Scotland) St Johnstone
27 July 2022	31 May 2023	Tyler Onyango	Everton	Burton Albion
27 July 2022	31 May 2023	Daniel Oyegoke	Brentford	MK Dons
27 July 2022	31 May 2023	Dane Scarlett	Tottenham Hotspur	Portsmouth
27 July 2022	31 May 2023	(Portugal) Rúben Vinagre	(Portugal) Sporting	Everton
28 July 2022	31 May 2023	(Canada) Theo Corbeanu	Wolverhampton Wanderers	Blackpool
28 July 2022	31 May 2023	Ben Nelson	Leicester City	Rochdale
28 July 2022	31 May 2023	Andy Smith	Hull City	Grimsby Town
28 July 2022	31 May 2023	Ellis Taylor	Sunderland	Hartlepool United
29 July 2022	31 May 2023	(Republic of Ireland) James Brown	Blackburn Rovers	Stockport County
29 July 2022	31 May 2023	Teddy Jenks	Brighton & Hove Albion	Crawley Town
29 July 2022	31 May 2023	(Netherlands) Nigel Lonwijk	Wolverhampton Wanderers	Plymouth Argyle
29 July 2022	31 May 2023	(Senegal) Mamadou Loum	(Portugal) Porto	Reading
29 July 2022	31 December 2022	Glenn Morris	Crawley Town	Gillingham
29 July 2022	31 May 2023	Arthur Okonkwo	Arsenal	Crewe Alexandra
29 July 2022	31 May 2023	Ellis Simms	Everton	Sunderland
29 July 2022	31 May 2023	(Scotland) Cieran Slicker	Manchester City	Rochdale
29 July 2022	31 May 2023	Nathan Young-Coombes	Brentford	AFC Wimbledon
30 July 2022	31 May 2023	Ellery Balcombe	Brentford	Crawley Town
30 July 2022	31 May 2023	(Portugal) Nuno Tavares	Arsenal	(France) Marseille
1 August 2022	31 May 2023	Tyler Morton	Liverpool	Blackburn Rovers
1 August 2022	31 May 2023	(Republic of Ireland) Mazeed Ogungbo	Arsenal	Crawley Town
1 August 2022	31 May 2023	(Wales) Joe Rodon	Tottenham Hotspur	(France) Rennes
2 August 2022	31 May 2023	John McAtee	Luton Town	Grimsby Town
3 August 2022	31 May 2023	Lewis Dobbin	Everton	Derby County
3 August 2022	31 May 2023	(Republic of Ireland) Jamie McGrath	Wigan Athletic	(Scotland) Dundee United
3 August 2022	31 May 2023	Charlie Patino	Arsenal	Blackpool
3 August 2022	31 December 2022	(United States) Gabriel Slonina	Chelsea	(United States) Chicago Fire
4 August 2022	31 May 2023	Lewis Bate	Leeds United	Oxford United
4 August 2022	31 May 2023	James McAtee	Manchester City	Sheffield United
4 August 2022	31 May 2023	Jack Stretton	Derby County	Carlisle United
4 August 2022	31 May 2023	(Serbia) Slobodan Tedić	Manchester City	Barnsley
5 August 2022	31 May 2023	Levi Colwill	Chelsea	Brighton & Hove Albion
5 August 2022	31 May 2023	Jeriel Dorsett	Reading	(Scotland) Kilmarnock
5 August 2022	31 May 2023	(Republic of Ireland) Shane Duffy	Brighton & Hove Albion	Fulham
5 August 2022	31 May 2023	Aaron Ramsey	Aston Villa	Norwich City
6 August 2022	31 May 2023	Leighton Clarkson	Liverpool	(Scotland) Aberdeen
7 August 2022	31 May 2023	Owen Dale	Blackpool	Portsmouth
8 August 2022	31 May 2023	(Scotland) Scott Banks	Crystal Palace	Bradford City
8 August 2022	31 May 2023	Conor Coady	Wolverhampton Wanderers	Everton
8 August 2022	31 May 2023	(Canada) Aribim Pepple	Luton Town	Grimsby Town
8 August 2022	31 May 2023	Rayhaan Tulloch	West Bromwich Albion	Rochdale
9 August 2022	31 May 2023	(Wales) Nathan Broadhead	Everton	Wigan Athletic
10 August 2022	31 May 2023	Frazer Blake-Tracy	Burton Albion	Swindon Town
10 August 2022	31 May 2023	Hamza Choudhury	Leicester City	Watford
10 August 2022	31 May 2023	(France) Malang Sarr	Chelsea	(France) Monaco
11 August 2022	31 May 2023	(Jamaica) Jordon Garrick	(Wales) Swansea City	Lincoln City
11 August 2022	31 May 2023	(Scotland) Kyle Joseph	(Wales) Swansea City	Oxford United
11 August 2022	31 May 2023	(Spain) Pablo Marí	Arsenal	(Italy) Monza
11 August 2022	31 May 2023	Jesurun Rak-Sakyi	Crystal Palace	Charlton Athletic
11 August 2022	31 May 2023	Jack Stevens	Oxford United	Port Vale
11 August 2022	31 May 2023	Nathan Tella	Southampton	Burnley
12 August 2022	31 May 2023	(Tunisia) Idris El Mizouni	Ipswich Town	Leyton Orient
12 August 2022	31 May 2023	Ashley Fletcher	Watford	Wigan Athletic
12 August 2022	31 May 2023	Lewis Gibson	Everton	Bristol Rovers
12 August 2022	31 May 2023	Kaine Kesler Hayden	Aston Villa	Huddersfield Town
12 August 2022	31 December 2022	(Northern Ireland) Charlie Owens	Queens Park Rangers	Colchester United
13 August 2022	31 May 2023	Keinan Davis	Aston Villa	Watford
13 August 2022	31 May 2023	Alex Mowatt	West Bromwich Albion	Middlesbrough
14 August 2022	31 May 2023	(Ghana) Joseph Anang	West Ham United	Derby County
15 August 2022	31 May 2023	Hakeeb Adelakun	Lincoln City	Gillingham
15 August 2022	31 May 2023	Ethan Laird	Manchester United	Queens Park Rangers
15 August 2022	31 May 2023	(Poland) Jakub Stolarczyk	Leicester City	Fleetwood Town
15 August 2022	31 May 2023	(Wales) Doug Tharme	Blackpool	Accrington Stanley
16 August 2022	31 May 2023	(Ghana) Tariqe Fosu	Brentford	Stoke City
16 August 2022	31 May 2023	(Spain) Carlos Mendes Gomes	Luton Town	Fleetwood Town
16 August 2022	31 May 2023	(Italy) Destiny Udogie	Tottenham Hotspur	(Italy) Udinese
18 August 2022	31 May 2023	Liam Delap	Manchester City	Stoke City
18 August 2022	31 December 2022	Duncan Idehen	Bristol City	Carlisle United
18 August 2022	31 May 2023	Thierry Nevers	West Ham United	(Wales) Newport County
19 August 2022	31 May 2023	(Republic of Ireland) Mark McGuinness	(Wales) Cardiff City	Sheffield Wednesday
19 August 2022	31 May 2023	(Republic of Ireland) Corrie Ndaba	Ipswich Town	Burton Albion
19 August 2022	31 May 2023	(France) Tanguy Ndombele	Tottenham Hotspur	(Italy) Napoli
19 August 2022	31 December 2022	(Wales) David Robson	Hull City	Crawley Town
19 August 2022	31 May 2023	(Republic of Ireland) Joe O'Shaughnessy	Wolverhampton Wanderers	Bradford City
21 August 2022	31 May 2023	(Brazil) Rodrigo Muniz	Fulham	Middlesbrough
22 August 2022	31 May 2023	Kortney Hause	Aston Villa	Watford
22 August 2022	31 May 2023	Brooke Norton-Cuffy	Arsenal	Rotherham United
22 August 2022	31 May 2023	Myles Peart-Harris	Brentford	Forest Green Rovers
22 August 2022	31 May 2023	(Burkina Faso) Bertrand Traoré	Aston Villa	(Turkey) İstanbul Başakşehir
23 August 2022	31 May 2023	(Ivory Coast) Hassane Kamara	(Italy) Udinese	Watford
23 August 2022	31 May 2023	(Netherlands) Salah-Eddine Oulad M'Hand	Arsenal	Hull City
23 August 2022	31 May 2023	(Switzerland) Lorent Tolaj	Brighton & Hove Albion	Salford City
24 August 2022	31 May 2023	Rekeem Harper	Ipswich Town	Exeter City
25 August 2022	31 May 2023	Dele Alli	Everton	(Turkey) Beşiktaş
25 August 2022	31 May 2023	Ben Chrisene	Aston Villa	(Scotland) Kilmarnock
25 August 2022	31 December 2022	(Wales) Eli King	(Wales) Cardiff City	Crewe Alexandra
25 August 2022	31 December 2022	Matt Penney	Ipswich Town	(Scotland) Motherwell
25 August 2022	31 May 2023	(Ivory Coast) Nicolas Pépé	Arsenal	(France) Nice
25 August 2022	31 May 2023	(Romania) George Pușcaș	Reading	(Italy) Genoa
26 August 2022	31 May 2023	Daniel Chesters	West Ham United	Colchester United
26 August 2022	31 May 2023	Jack Jenkins	Leeds United	Salford City
26 August 2022	31 May 2023	(Republic of Ireland) Mipo Odubeko	West Ham United	Port Vale
26 August 2022	31 May 2023	Kieran Phillips	Huddersfield Town	Morecambe
26 August 2022	31 May 2023	(South Korea) Hwang Ui-jo	Nottingham Forest	(Greece) Olympiacos
27 August 2022	31 May 2023	(France) Niels Nkounkou	Everton	(Wales) Cardiff City
27 August 2022	31 May 2023	Ian Poveda	Leeds United	Blackpool
28 August 2022	31 May 2023	Luke Cundle	Wolverhampton Wanderers	(Wales) Swansea City
29 August 2022	31 May 2023	Jack Diamond	Sunderland	Lincoln City
29 August 2022	31 May 2023	(Republic of Ireland) Joshua Kayode	Rotherham United	MK Dons
29 August 2022	31 May 2023	(Brazil) Renan Lodi	(Spain) Atlético Madrid	Nottingham Forest
29 August 2022	31 May 2023	(Tunisia) Hannibal Mejbri	Manchester United	Birmingham City
29 August 2022	31 May 2023	Alex Mighten	Nottingham Forest	Sheffield Wednesday
30 August 2022	31 May 2023	(Jamaica) Rolando Aarons	Huddersfield Town	(Scotland) Motherwell
30 August 2022	31 May 2023	Callum Hudson-Odoi	Chelsea	(Germany) Bayer Leverkusen
30 August 2022	31 May 2023	Charley Kendall	Lincoln City	Sutton United
30 August 2022	31 May 2023	Emmanuel Longelo	West Ham United	Birmingham City
30 August 2022	31 May 2023	(Democratic Republic of the Congo) Beryly Lubala	Blackpool	Colchester United
30 August 2022	31 May 2023	(Republic of Ireland) Armstrong Oko-Flex	West Ham United	(Wales) Swansea City
30 August 2022	31 May 2023	(Spain) Sergio Reguilón	Tottenham Hotspur	(Spain) Atlético Madrid
30 August 2022	31 May 2023	Harry Winks	Tottenham Hotspur	(Italy) Sampdoria
31 August 2022	31 May 2023	(Wales) Owen Beck	Liverpool	Bolton Wanderers
31 August 2022	31 May 2023	(Ivory Coast) Amad	Manchester United	Sunderland
31 August 2022	31 May 2023	George Hirst	Leicester City	Blackburn Rovers
31 August 2022	31 May 2023	Josh Martin	Norwich City	Barnsley
31 August 2022	31 May 2023	(France) Edouard Michut	(France) Paris Saint-Germain	Sunderland
31 August 2022	31 May 2023	(Ghana) Baba Rahman	Chelsea	Reading
1 September 2022	31 May 2023	(Wales) Ethan Ampadu	Chelsea	(Italy) Spezia
1 September 2022	31 May 2023	(Ghana) Kwesi Appiah	Crawley Town	Colchester United
1 September 2022	31 May 2023	(France) Loïc Badé	(France) Rennes	Nottingham Forest
1 September 2022	31 May 2023	(Poland) Jan Bednarek	Southampton	Aston Villa
1 September 2022	31 May 2023	(Germany) Jordan Beyer	(Germany) Borussia Mönchengladbach	Burnley
1 September 2022	31 May 2023	Josh Bowler	Nottingham Forest	(Greece) Olympiacos
1 September 2022	31 May 2023	Daniel Butterworth	Blackburn Rovers	Port Vale
1 September 2022	31 May 2023	Danny Cashman	Coventry City	Walsall
1 September 2022	1 January 2023	(Australia) Jacob Chapman	Huddersfield Town	Salford City
1 September 2022	31 May 2023	Caleb Chukwuemeka	Aston Villa	Crawley Town
1 September 2022	31 May 2023	Josh Coburn	Middlesbrough	Bristol Rovers
1 September 2022	31 May 2023	Josh Coley	Exeter City	Harrogate Town
1 September 2022	31 May 2023	Sam Cosgrove	Birmingham City	Plymouth Argyle
1 September 2022	31 May 2023	(Turkey) Halil Dervişoğlu	Brentford	Burnley
1 September 2022	31 May 2023	(Guyana) Stephen Duke-McKenna	Queens Park Ranges	Leyton Orient
1 September 2022	31 May 2023	(Slovakia) Martin Dúbravka	Newcastle United	Manchester United
1 September 2022	31 May 2023	Rarmani Edmonds-Green	Huddersfield Town	Wigan Athletic
1 September 2022	31 May 2023	Tom Edwards	Stoke City	Barnsley
1 September 2022	31 May 2023	Tom Fellows	West Bromwich Albion	Crawley Town
1 September 2022	31 May 2023	(Norway) Bryan Fiabema	Chelsea	Forest Green Rovers
1 September 2022	31 May 2023	Will Fish	Manchester United	(Scotland) Hibernian
1 September 2022	31 May 2023	(Northern Ireland) Ethan Galbraith	Manchester United	Salford City
1 September 2022	31 May 2023	Alex Gilbey	Charlton Athletic	Stevenage
1 September 2022	31 May 2023	Paul Glatzel	Liverpool	Tranmere Rovers
1 September 2022	31 May 2023	Danny Grant	huddersfield Town	Harrogate Town
1 September 2022	31 May 2023	Stephen Humphrys	Wigan Athletic	(Scotland) Hearts
1 September 2022	31 May 2023	Tim Iroegbunam	Aston Villa	Queens Park Rangers
1 September 2022	31 May 2023	(Wales) Daniel James	Leeds United	Fulham
1 September 2022	31 May 2023	(Bulgaria) Sylvester Jasper	Fulham	Bristol Rovers
1 September 2022	31 May 2023	(Wales) Luke Jephcott	Plymouth Argyle	Swindon Town
1 September 2022	31 May 2023	Josh Koroma	Huddersfield Town	Portsmouth
1 September 2022	31 May 2023	(France) Layvin Kurzawa	(France) Paris Saint-Germain	Fulham
1 September 2022	31 May 2023	Hayden Lindley	Aston Villa	(Wales) Newport County
1 September 2022	1 January 2023	Matty Longstaff	Newcastle United	Colchester United
1 September 2022	31 May 2023	Ainsley Maitland-Niles	Arsenal	Southampton
1 September 2022	31 May 2023	(Switzerland) Christian Marques	Wolverhampton Wanderers	Forest Green Rovers
1 September 2022	31 May 2023	Luke Mbete	Manchester City	Huddersfield Town
1 September 2022	31 May 2023	(Scotland) Liam McCarron	Stoke City	Port Vale
1 September 2022	31 May 2023	(Brazil) Arthur Melo	(Italy) Juventus	Liverpool
1 September 2022	31 May 2023	(Tanzania) Haji Mnoga	Portsmouth	Gillingham
1 September 2022	31 May 2023	Clinton Mola	(Germany) VfB Stuttgart	Blackburn Rovers
1 September 2022	31 May 2023	(Zimbabwe) Admiral Muskwe	Luton Town	Fleetwood Town
1 September 2022	31 May 2023	(Kenya) Clarke Oduor	Barnsley	Hartlepool United
1 September 2022	31 May 2023	(Denmark) William Osula	Sheffield United	Derby County
1 September 2022	31 May 2023	(Greece) Dimitrios Pelkas	(Turkey) Fenerbahçe	Hull City
1 September 2022	31 May 2023	Dion Pereira	Luton Town	Bradford City
1 September 2022	31 May 2023	(Romania) Dennis Politic	(Italy) Cremonese	Port Vale
1 September 2022	31 May 2023	Scott Quigley	Stockport County	Rochdale
1 September 2022	31 May 2023	Lewis Richardson	Burnley	Grimsby Town
1 September 2022	31 May 2023	Christian Saydee	Bournemouth	Shrewsbury Town
1 September 2022	31 May 2023	Liam Shaw	(Scotland) Celtic	Morecambe
1 September 2022	31 May 2023	Keyendrah Simmonds	Birmingham City	Grimsby Town
1 September 2022	31 May 2023	Dynel Simeu	Southampton	Tranmere Rovers
1 September 2022	31 May 2023	Xavier Simons	Chelsea	Hull City
1 September 2022	31 May 2023	Harry Smith	Leyton Orient	Exeter City
1 September 2022	31 May 2023	Jack Stephens	Southampton	Bournemouth
1 September 2022	31 May 2023	(Wales) Fin Stevens	Brentford	(Wales) Swansea City
1 September 2022	31 May 2023	Dujon Sterling	Chelsea	Stoke City
1 September 2022	31 May 2023	Rob Street	Crystal Palace	Shrewsbury Town
1 September 2022	31 May 2023	Bobby Thomas	Burnley	Bristol Rovers
1 September 2022	31 May 2023	Elliot Thorpe	Luton Town	Burton Albion
1 September 2022	31 May 2023	Ryley Towler	Bristol City	AFC Wimbledon
1 September 2022	31 May 2023	(Mali) Boubacar Traoré	(France) Metz	Wolverhampton Wanderers
1 September 2022	31 May 2023	Harvey Vale	Chelsea	Hull City
1 September 2022	31 May 2023	Matty Virtue	Blackpool	Lincoln City
1 September 2022	31 May 2023	Jayden Wareham	Chelsea	Leyton Orient
1 September 2022	31 May 2023	Lewis Warrington	Everton	Fleetwood Town
1 September 2022	1 January 2023	Kelland Watts	Newcastle United	Peterborough United
1 September 2022	31 May 2023	(Wales) Daniel Williams	(Wales) Swansea City	(Wales) The New Saints
1 September 2022	31 May 2023	(Northern Ireland) Carl Winchester	Sunderland	Shrewsbury Town
1 September 2022	31 May 2023	Max Woltman	Liverpool	Doncaster Rovers
1 September 2022	31 May 2023	(Republic of Ireland) Tyreik Wright	Aston Villa	Bradford City
