= List of English football transfers winter 2021–22 =

The 2021–22 English football winter transfer window ran from 2 September 2021 to 2 February 2022. Players without a club could be signed at any time, clubs could sign players on loan dependent on their league's regulations, and clubs could sign a goalkeeper on an emergency loan if they had no registered senior goalkeeper available. This list includes transfers featuring at least one club from either the Premier League or the EFL that were completed after the end of the summer 2021 transfer window on 31 August and before the end of the 2021–22 winter window.

== Transfers ==
All players and clubs without a flag are English. Note that while Cardiff City, Swansea City and Newport County are affiliated with the Football Association of Wales and thus take the Welsh flag, they play in the Championship and League Two respectively, and so their transfers are included here.

Date	Player	Moving from	Moving to	Fee
6 September 2021	(Ghana) Joe Dodoo	Unattached	Doncaster Rovers	Free
6 September 2021	(Senegal) Pape Souaré	Unattached	Charlton Athletic	Free
7 September 2021	Kean Bryan	Unattached	West Bromwich Albion	Free
7 September 2021	(Republic of Ireland) Stephen Henderson	Unattached	Charlton Athletic	Free
7 September 2021	(Wales) Joel Lynch	Unattached	Crawley Town	Free
7 September 2021	(Scotland) Barrie McKay	(Wales) Swansea City	(Scotland) Heart of Midlothian	Free
9 September 2021	(Denmark) Mathias Jørgensen	Unattached	Brentford	Free
10 September 2021	Kieran Agard	Unattached	Plymouth Argyle	Free
10 September 2021	(Northern Ireland) Ryan McLaughlin	Unattached	Morecambe	Free
10 September 2021	Joseph Olowu	Unattached	Doncaster Rovers	Free
13 September 2021	(Algeria) Adlène Guedioura	Unattached	Sheffield United	Free
13 September 2021	Connor Wickham	Unattached	Preston North End	Free
16 September 2021	Jordan Cook	Unattached	Hartlepool United	Free
16 September 2021	(Cameroon) Mike Fondop	Unattached	Hartlepool United	Free
22 September 2021	(Colombia) James Rodríguez	Everton	(Qatar) Al-Rayyan	Undisclosed
24 September 2021	Jay Mingi	Unattached	Portsmouth	Free
24 September 2021	(Wales) Elliot Thorpe	Unattached	Luton Town	Free
25 September 2021	Aramide Oteh	Unattached	Salford City	Free
7 October 2021	(Northern Ireland) Conor McLaughlin	Unattached	Fleetwood Town	Free
7 October 2021	(Cameroon) Nicolas Nkoulou	Unattached	Watford	Free
14 October 2021	Mark Howard	Unattached	Carlisle United	Free
18 October 2021	(Republic of Ireland) Robbie Brady	Unattached	Bournemouth	Free
18 October 2021	Otis Khan	Unattached	Walsall	Free
23 October 2021	Adam Smith	Unattached	Stevenage	Free
12 November 2021	Theo Vassell	Unattached	Salford City	Free
15 November 2021	Andy Carroll	Unattached	Reading	Free
18 November 2021	(Wales) Neil Taylor	Unattached	Middlesbrough	Free
20 November 2021	(Iraq) Ali Al-Hamadi	Unattached	Wycombe Wanderers	Free
22 November 2021	Nathaniel Mendez-Laing	Unattached	Sheffield Wednesday	Free
6 December 2021	(Argentina) Willy Caballero	Unattached	Southampton	Free
1 January 2022	(Northern Ireland) Dion Charles	Accrington Stanley	Bolton Wanderers	Undisclosed
1 January 2022	(United States) Daryl Dike	(United States) Orlando City	West Bromwich Albion	Undisclosed
1 January 2022	(Ukraine) Vitalii Mykolenko	(Ukraine) Dynamo Kyiv	Everton	Undisclosed
1 January 2022	(Nigeria) Maduka Okoye	(Netherlands) Sparta Rotterdam	Watford	Undisclosed
1 January 2022	(Spain) Ferran Torres	Manchester City	(Spain) Barcelona	Undisclosed
2 January 2022	Harvey Macadam	Ashton United	Fleetwood Town	Undisclosed
3 January 2022	(Scotland) Ali Crawford	Bolton Wanderers	(Scotland) St Johnstone	Free
3 January 2022	Emmanuel Idem	Unattached	Swindon Town	Undisclosed
3 January 2022	Luke O'Neill	Kettering Town	Stevenage	Undisclosed
3 January 2022	Joel Senior	Altrincham	Carlisle United	Undisclosed
4 January 2022	(Wales) Morgan Boyes	Liverpool	(Scotland) Livingston	Free
4 January 2022	Steve Cook	Bournemouth	Nottingham Forest	Undisclosed
4 January 2022	(Scotland) Tony Gallacher	Liverpool	(Scotland) St Johnstone	Free
4 January 2022	(Northern Ireland) Trai Hume	(Northern Ireland) Linfield	Sunderland	£200,000
4 January 2022	(Ivory Coast) Hassane Kamara	(France) Nice	Watford	£4m
4 January 2022	Ryan Loft	Scunthorpe United	Bristol Rovers	Undisclosed
4 January 2022	(Wales) Rollin Menayese	Mansfield Town	Walsall	Undisclosed
4 January 2022	(Scotland) Nathan Patterson	(Scotland) Rangers	Everton	£11.5m
4 January 2022	Ed Upson	(Wales) Newport County	Stevenage	Undisclosed
5 January 2022	James Hill	Fleetwood Town	Bournemouth	£1m
5 January 2022	(Japan) Hayao Kawabe	(Switzerland) Grasshopper	Wolverhampton Wanderers	Undisclosed
5 January 2022	(Poland) Kacper Kozłowski	(Poland) Pogoń Szczecin	Brighton & Hove Albion	Undisclosed
5 January 2022	Alfie Lewis	(Republic of Ireland) St Patrick's Athletic	Plymouth Argyle	Free
5 January 2022	(Wales) Ben Williams	Barnsley	Cheltenham Town	Undisclosed
6 January 2022	Charlie Brown	MK Dons	Cheltenham Town	Undisclosed
6 January 2022	(Republic of Ireland) James Brown	Unattached	Blackburn Rovers	Free
6 January 2022	Tom Dallison	Crawley Town	Colchester United	Undisclosed
6 January 2022	(Netherlands) Jürgen Locadia	Brighton & Hove Albion	(Germany) VfL Bochum	Free
6 January 2022	(Brazil) Samir	(Italy) Udinese	Watford	Undisclosed
6 January 2022	Omari Patrick	Burton Albion	Carisle United	Undisclosed
6 January 2022	Laurie Walker	MK Dons	Stevenage	Undisclosed
7 January 2022	(Northern Ireland) Caolan Boyd-Munce	Birmingham City	Middlesbrough	Undisclosed
7 January 2022	(Wales) Cameron Coxe	Solihull Moors	Colchester United	Undisclosed
7 January 2022	(Democratic Republic of the Congo) Edo Kayembe	(Belgium) Eupen	Watford	Undisclosed
7 January 2022	Rosaire Longelo	Newcastle United	Accrington Stanley	Undisclosed
7 January 2022	Kieran Trippier	(Spain) Atlético Madrid	Newcastle United	£12m
7 January 2022	Taylor Seymour	Burgess Hill Town	Crawley Town	Free
8 January 2022	(Wales) Ellis Harrison	Portsmouth	Fleetwood Town	Undisclosed
8 January 2022	(Canada) Richie Laryea	(Canada) Toronto	Nottingham Forest	Undisclosed
10 January 2022	Jake Beesley	Rochdale	Blackpool	Undisclosed
10 January 2022	Marcus Carver	Southport	Hartlepool United	Undisclosed
10 January 2022	Chris Hussey	Cheltenham Town	Port Vale	Undisclosed
11 January 2022	Andrew Fisher	MK Dons	(Wales) Swansea City	Undisclosed
11 January 2022	Connor Hall	Harrogate Town	Port Vale	Undisclosed
11 January 2022	Reece Hutchinson	Unattached	Cheltenham Town	Free
11 January 2022	(France) William Kokolo	Middlesbrough	Burton Albion	Undisclosed
11 January 2022	Leon Legge	Port Vale	Harrogate Town	Undisclosed
11 January 2022	(Scotland) David Marshall	Derby County	Queens Park Rangers	Undisclosed
11 January 2022	Aaron Morley	Rochdale	Bolton Wanderers	Undisclosed
12 January 2022	Kieran Agard	Unattached	Doncaster Rovers	Free
12 January 2022	(Wales) James Waite	(Wales) Penybont	(Wales) Newport County	Undisclosed
13 January 2022	(Morocco) Gassan Ahadme	Norwich City	Burton Albion	Undisclosed
13 January 2022	Owen Dale	Crewe Alexandra	Blackpool	Undisclosed
13 January 2022	(France) Lucas Digne	Everton	Aston Villa	£25m
13 January 2022	Kane Hemmings	Burton Albion	Tranmere Rovers	Undisclosed
13 January 2022	(Northern Ireland) Josh Magennis	Hull City	Wigan Athletic	Undisclosed
13 January 2022	(New Zealand) Chris Wood	Burnley	Newcastle United	£25m
14 January 2022	Chuks Aneke	Birmingham City	Charlton Athletic	Undisclosed
14 January 2022	(Australia) Riley McGree	(United States) Charlotte	Middlesbrough	Undisclosed
14 January 2022	(Democratic Republic of the Congo) Aristote Nsiala	Ipswich Town	Fleetwood Town	Undisclosed
14 January 2022	(Australia) Jay Rich-Baghuelou	Crystal Palace	Accrington Stanley	Undisclosed
14 January 2022	(Scotland) Kerr Smith	(Scotland) Dundee United	Aston Villa	Undisclosed
14 January 2022	(Wales) Ash Taylor	Walsall	(Scotland) Kilmarnock	Free
14 January 2022	Ryan Watson	Tranmere Rovers	Salford City	Undisclosed
15 January 2022	Lewis Baker	Chelsea	Stoke City	Undisclosed
15 January 2022	(Wales) Emyr Huws	Unattached	Colchester United	Free
15 January 2022	Phil Jagielka	Derby County	Stoke City	Free
16 January 2022	(Scotland) Graeme Shinnie	Derby County	Wigan Athletic	Undisclosed
17 January 2022	Jake Bidwell	(Wales) Swansea City	Coventry City	Free
17 January 2022	(Portugal) Chiquinho	(Portugal) Estoril	Wolverhampton Wanderers	£3m
18 January 2022	Danny Batth	Stoke City	Sunderland	Free
18 January 2022	Charlie Colkett	Unattached	Cheltenham Town	Free
18 January 2022	(France) Ousmane Fané	Unattached	Morecambe	Free
18 January 2022	(Bosnia and Herzegovina) Sead Kolašinac	Arsenal	(France) Marseille	Free
18 January 2022	Dilan Markanday	Tottenham Hotspur	Blackburn Rovers	Undisclosed
18 January 2022	John Marquis	Portsmouth	Lincoln City	Undisclosed
19 January 2022	Otis Khan	Walsall	Leyton Orient	Free
19 January 2022	Matt Smith	Millwall	Salford City	Free
19 January 2022	Christian Walton	Brighton & Hove Albion	Ipswich Town	Undisclosed
19 January 2022	Ollie Younger	Sunderland	Doncaster Rovers	Free
20 January 2022	Lucas Akins	Burton Albion	Mansfield Town	Undisclosed
20 January 2022	(Iceland) Jón Daði Böðvarsson	Millwall	Bolton Wanderers	Free
20 January 2022	Luke Charman	Darlington	Rochdale	Undisclosed
20 January 2022	Matt O'Riley	MK Dons	(Scotland) Celtic	Undisclosed
21 January 2022	Max Clark	Fleetwood Town	Rochdale	Free
21 January 2022	Jonathan Mitchell	Hartlepool United	Doncaster Rovers	Free
21 January 2022	(Romania) Dennis Politic	Bolton Wanderers	(Italy) Cremonese	Undisclosed
21 January 2022	Patrick Roberts	Manchester City	Sunderland	Free
21 January 2022	Connor Wickham	Preston North End	MK Dons	Free
21 January 2022	Jordan Wright	Nottingham Forest	Lincoln City	Undisclosed
24 January 2022	Jordan Brown	Derby County	Leyton Orient	Free
24 January 2022	Ethan Coleman	King's Lynn Town	Leyton Orient	Free
24 January 2022	(Montserrat) Donervon Daniels	Crewe Alexandra	Walsall	Undisclosed
24 January 2022	Ben House	Eastleigh	Lincoln City	Undisclosed
24 January 2022	Demetri Mitchell	Blackpool	(Scotland) Hibernian	Undisclosed
24 January 2022	Dylan Williams	Derby County	Chelsea	Undisclosed
25 January 2022	Adam Clayton	Unattached	Doncaster Rovers	Free
25 January 2022	(Wales) Adam Davies	Stoke City	Sheffield United	Undisclosed
25 January 2022	Josh Hawkes	Sunderland	Tranmere Rovers	Undisclosed
25 January 2022	(Republic of Ireland) Lee O'Connor	(Scotland) Celtic	Tranmere Rovers	Undisclosed
25 January 2022	Curtis Tilt	Rotherham United	Wigan Athletic	Undisclosed
26 January 2022	(South Korea) Hwang Hee-chan	(Germany) RB Leipzig	Wolverhampton Wanderers	£14M
26 January 2022	Denver Hume	Sunderland	Portsmouth	Undisclosed
26 January 2022	Liam Feeney	Tranmere Rovers	Scunthorpe United	Free
26 January 2022	(Nigeria) Samuel Kalu	(France) Bordeaux	Watford	Undisclosed
26 January 2022	(United States) Damian Las	Fulham	(United States) Austin	Undisclosed
26 January 2022	Ollie Webber	Crystal Palace	Portsmouth	Undisclosed
27 January 2022	John Akinde	Gillingham	Colchester United	Free
27 January 2022	(Curaçao) Juninho Bacuna	(Scotland) Rangers	Birmingham City	Undisclosed
27 January 2022	Tahvon Campbell	Woking	Rochdale	Undisclosed
27 January 2022	Calum Chambers	Arsenal	Aston Villa	Free
27 January 2022	(Iceland) Daníel Grétarsson	Blackpool	(Poland) Śląsk Wrocław	Undisclosed
27 January 2022	(Scotland) Callum McFadzean	Crewe Alexandra	(Wales) Wrexham	Undisclosed
27 January 2022	(Germany) Bassala Sambou	(Netherlands) Fortuna Sittard	Crewe Alexandra	Undisclosed
27 January 2022	Toby Sibbick	Barnsley	(Scotland) Heart of Midlothian	Undisclosed
27 January 2022	Regan Slater	Sheffield United	Hull City	Undisclosed
28 January 2022	Dan Agyei	Oxford United	Crewe Alexandra	Undisclosed
28 January 2022	Omar Bogle	Doncaster Rovers	Hartlepool United	Free
28 January 2022	Rhys Bennett	Gillingham	Morecambe	Free
28 January 2022	Lee Brown	Portsmouth	AFC Wimbledon	Undisclosed
28 January 2022	Andy Carroll	Reading	West Bromwich Albion	Free
28 January 2022	(Republic of Ireland) Harry Charsley	Mansfield Town	Port Vale	Undisclosed
28 January 2022	(Cameroon) Jeando Fuchs	(Scotland) Dundee United	Peterborough United	Undisclosed
28 January 2022	(Republic of Ireland) Georgie Kelly	(Republic of Ireland) Bohemians	Rotherham United	Free
28 January 2022	Charley Kendall	Eastbourne Borough	Lincoln City	Undisclosed
28 January 2022	(Republic of Ireland) Corey O'Keeffe	Mansfield Town	Rochdale	Free
28 January 2022	(Republic of Ireland) Kieran Sadlier	Rotherham United	Bolton Wanderers	Free
28 January 2022	(South Korea) Jung Sang-bin	(South Korea) Suwon Samsung Bluewings	Wolverhampton Wanderers	£1M
28 January 2022	Kieran Wallace	Burton Albion	Mansfield Town	Free
28 January 2022	Tariq Uwakwe	Chelsea	Crewe Alexandra	Undisclosed
29 January 2022	Sam Ashford	Crawley Town	(Scotland) Ayr United	Free
29 January 2022	(Portugal) João Carvalho	Nottingham Forest	(Greece) Olympiacos	Undisclosed
29 January 2022	(Jamaica) Anthony Grant	Swindon Town	Scunthorpe United	Free
30 January 2022	(Colombia) Luis Díaz	(Portugal) Porto	Liverpool	£37.5M
30 January 2022	(Brazil) Bruno Guimarães	(France) Lyon	Newcastle United	Undisclosed
30 January 2022	(Wales) Ryan Hedges	(Scotland) Aberdeen	Blackburn Rovers	Undisclosed
31 January 2022	Dele Alli	Tottenham Hotspur	Everton	Free
31 January 2022	(Argentina) Julián Álvarez	(Argentina) River Plate	Manchester City	£14.1M
31 January 2022	(Denmark) Frederik Alves	West Ham United	(Denmark) Brøndby	Undisclosed
31 January 2022	(Scotland) Louis Appéré	(Scotland) Dundee United	Northampton Town	Undisclosed
31 January 2022	James Ball	Solihull Moors	Rochdale	Undisclosed
31 January 2022	(Uruguay) Rodrigo Bentancur	(Italy) Juventus	Tottenham Hotspur	£15.9M
31 January 2022	Jamal Blackman	Unattached	Huddersfield Town	Free
31 January 2022	Luke Bolton	Manchester City	Salford City	Free
31 January 2022	Nathan Broome	Stoke City	AFC Wimbledon	Free
31 January 2022	Marcus Browne	Middlesbrough	Oxford United	Undisclosed
31 January 2022	Reece Brown	Huddersfield Town	Peterborough United	Free
31 January 2022	Dan Burn	Brighton & Hove Albion	Newcastle United	£13M
31 January 2022	(Republic of Ireland) Niall Canavan	Bradford City	Barrow	Undisclosed
31 January 2022	(Republic of Ireland) Dylan Connolly	Northampton Town	Morecambe	Undisclosed
31 January 2022	Billy Crellin	Fleetwood Town	Everton	Undisclosed
31 January 2022	Jermain Defoe	Unattached	Sunderland	Free
31 January 2022	Kyle Dempsey	Gillingham	Bolton Wanderers	Undisclosed
31 January 2022	Kristian Dennis	(Scotland) St Mirren	Carlisle United	Undisclosed
31 January 2022	(Republic of Ireland) Jamie Devitt	Barrow	Carlisle United	Free
31 January 2022	(Senegal) Bambo Diaby	Unattached	Preston North End	Free
31 January 2022	(Denmark) Christian Eriksen	Unattached	Brentford	Free
31 January 2022	(Netherlands) Carel Eiting	(Belgium) Genk	Huddersfield Town	Free
31 January 2022	(Northern Ireland) Tom Flanagan	Sunderland	Shrewsbury Town	Undisclosed
31 January 2022	(Cameroon) Mike Fondop	Hartlepool United	Oldham Athletic	Free
31 January 2022	(Scotland) Scott Fraser	Ipswich Town	Charlton Athletic	Undisclosed
31 January 2022	Camron Gbadebo	Manchester City	Colchester United	Free
31 January 2022	Reo Griffiths	(France) Lyon	Doncaster Rovers	Undisclosed
31 January 2022	Nick Hayes	Hemel Hempstead Town	Ipswich Town	Undisclosed
31 January 2022	Luke Hendrie	Hartlepool United	Bradford City	Free
31 January 2022	Sam Hughes	Leicester City	Burton Albion	Undisclosed
31 January 2022	Dan Kemp	Leyton Orient	MK Dons	Undisclosed
31 January 2022	Ryan Longman	Brighton & Hove Albion	Hull City	Undisclosed
31 January 2022	(France) Jean-Philippe Mateta	(Germany) 1. FSV Mainz 05	Crystal Palace	Undisclosed
31 January 2022	Jay Matete	Fleetwood Town	Sunderland	Undisclosed
31 January 2022	(Republic of Ireland) Jamie McGrath	(Scotland) St Mirren	Wigan Athletic	Undisclosed
31 January 2022	(Wales) Kieffer Moore	(Wales) Cardiff City	Bournemouth	Undisclosed
31 January 2022	Joe Nuttall	Blackpool	Scunthorpe United	Undisclosed
31 January 2022	Nathanael Ogbeta	Shrewsbury Town	(Wales) Swansea City	Undisclosed
31 January 2022	(Belgium) Denis Odoi	Fulham	(Belgium) Club Brugge	Undisclosed
31 January 2022	(Republic of Ireland) Aiden O'Brien	Sunderland	Portsmouth	Free
31 January 2022	Jonathan Panzo	(France) Dijon	Nottingham Forest	Undisclosed
31 January 2022	Luke Plange	Derby County	Crystal Palace	Undisclosed
31 January 2022	(Algeria) Ali Reghba	Leicester City	(Algeria) CR Belouizdad	Undisclosed
31 January 2022	Sammy Robinson	Manchester City	Port Vale	Undisclosed
31 January 2022	Tobi Sho-Silva	Sutton United	Carlisle United	Undisclosed
31 January 2022	(Croatia) Simon Sluga	Luton Town	(Bulgaria) Ludogorets Razgrad	Undisclosed
31 January 2022	(Wales) Matt Smith	Manchester City	MK Dons	Undisclosed
31 January 2022	(Northern Ireland) Oisin Smyth	(Northern Ireland) Dungannon Swifts	Oxford United	Undisclosed
31 January 2022	Sam Surridge	Stoke City	Nottingham Forest	Undisclosed
31 January 2022	Ben Thompson	Millwall	Gillingham	Free
31 January 2022	(United States) Auston Trusty	(United States) Colorado Rapids	Arsenal	Undisclosed
31 January 2022	(Germany) Deniz Undav	(Belgium) Union SG	Brighton & Hove Albion	Undisclosed
31 January 2022	(Netherlands) Wout Weghorst	(Germany) VfL Wolfsburg	Burnley	£12M
31 January 2022	Lewis Wing	Middlesbrough	Wycombe Wanderers	Free
1 February 2022	(Nigeria) Korede Adedoyin	Sheffield Wednesday	Accrington Stanley	Undisclosed
1 February 2022	Mason Burstow	Charlton Athletic	Chelsea	Undisclosed
1 February 2022	Jon Nolan	Ipswich Town	Bristol Rovers	Free
1 February 2022	(Republic of Ireland) Kieran O'Hara	Burton Albion	Fleetwood Town	Free
2 February 2022	(Gabon) Pierre-Emerick Aubameyang	Arsenal	(Spain) Barcelona	Free
3 February 2022	Aramide Oteh	Salford City	Crawley Town	Free
4 February 2022	Sam Baldock	Derby County	Oxford United	Free
4 February 2022	Tope Obadeyi	Unattached	Oldham Athletic	Free
4 February 2022	Adam Smith	Stevenage	Morecambe	Free
15 February 2022	Brandon Barker	(Scotland) Rangers	Reading	Free
17 February 2022	(Senegal) Oumar Niasse	Unattached	Burton Albion	Free
25 February 2022	(Algeria) Adlène Guedioura	Sheffield United	Burton Albion	Free
25 February 2022	(Scotland) Robert Snodgrass	Unattached	Luton Town	Free
25 February 2022	Lee Tomlin	Unattached	Walsall	Free
26 February 2022	Ronan Silva	Unattached	Crawley Town	Free
28 February 2022	(Republic of Ireland) Ryan Nolan	Unattached	Northampton Town	Free

== Loans ==
Start date	End date	Name	Moving from	Moving to
7 September 2021	14 September 2021	Jake Eastwood	Sheffield United	Portsmouth
24 September 2021	30 June 2022	(Scotland) Archie Mair	Norwich City	Lincoln City
26 October 2021	2 November 2021	(Czech Republic) Tomáš Holý	Ipswich Town	Cambridge United
20 November 2021	27 November 2021	(Republic of Ireland) Kieran O'Hara	Burton Albion	Scunthorpe United
23 November 2021	30 November 2021	Connal Trueman	Birmingham City	Oxford United
1 January 2022	30 June 2022	Keinan Davis	Aston Villa	Nottingham Forest
1 January 2022	30 June 2022	(The Gambia) Saikou Janneh	Bristol City	Shrewsbury Town
1 January 2022	30 June 2022	(Denmark) Jonas Lössl	(Denmark) Midtjylland	Brentford
1 January 2022	30 June 2022	(Nigeria) Maduka Okoye	Watford	(Netherlands) Sparta Rotterdam
1 January 2022	30 June 2022	(North Macedonia) Dejan Stojanović	Middlesbrough	(Germany) FC Ingolstadt 04
1 January 2022	30 June 2022	Morgan Whittaker	(Wales) Swansea City	Lincoln City
2 January 2022	30 June 2022	(Republic of Ireland) Aaron Connolly	Brighton & Hove Albion	Middlesbrough
3 January 2022	30 June 2022	(United States) Marlon Fossey	Fulham	Bolton Wanderers
3 January 2022	30 June 2022	Christy Pym	Peterborough United	Stevenage
4 January 2022	30 June 2022	Josh Austerfield	Huddersfield Town	Harrogate Town
4 January 2022	30 June 2022	Jacob Bedeau	Burnley	Morecambe
4 January 2022	30 June 2022	Michael Bostwick	Burton Albion	Stevenage
4 January 2022	30 June 2022	Sam Burns	Blackburn Rovers	Scunthorpe United
4 January 2022	30 June 2022	(France) Brahima Diarra	Huddersfield Town	Harrogate Town
4 January 2022	30 June 2022	(Scotland) Tom Dickson-Peters	Norwich City	Gillingham
4 January 2022	30 June 2022	Ryan Edmondson	Leeds United	Port Vale
4 January 2022	30 June 2022	Teden Mengi	Manchester United	Birmingham City
4 January 2022	30 June 2022	(Republic of Ireland) Jake O’Brien	Crystal Palace	Swindon Town
4 January 2022	30 June 2022	Dion Pereira	Luton Town	Bradford City
5 January 2022	30 June 2022	(Northern Ireland) Trevor Carson	(Scotland) Dundee United	Morecambe
5 January 2022	30 June 2022	(Japan) Hayao Kawabe	Wolverhampton Wanderers	(Switzerland) Grasshopper
5 January 2022	30 June 2022	(Poland) Kacper Kozłowski	Brighton & Hove Albion	(Poland) Pogoń Szczecin
5 January 2022	30 June 2022	(Scotland) Josh McPake	(Scotland) Rangers	Tranmere Rovers
5 January 2022	30 June 2022	Tyrese Omotoye	Norwich City	Carlisle United
6 January 2022	30 June 2022	Harry Clarke	Arsenal	(Scotland) Hibernian
6 January 2022	30 June 2022	Will Harris	Sunderland	Barrow
6 January 2022	30 June 2022	Ethan Laird	Manchester United	Bournemouth
6 January 2022	30 June 2022	Bali Mumba	Norwich City	Peterborough United
6 January 2022	30 June 2022	Dan Nlundulu	Southampton	Cheltenham Town
6 January 2022	30 June 2022	(Norway) Leo Østigård	Brighton & Hove Albion	(Italy) Genoa
6 January 2022	30 June 2022	Chanka Zimba	(Wales) Cardiff City	Northampton Town
7 January 2022	30 June 2022	(Finland) Terry Ablade	Fulham	AFC Wimbledon
7 January 2022	30 June 2022	(Canada) Theo Corbeanu	Wolverhampton Wanderers	MK Dons
7 January 2022	30 June 2022	(Brazil) Philippe Coutinho	(Spain) Barcelona	Aston Villa
7 January 2022	30 June 2022	Anthony Glennon	Burnley	Barrow
7 January 2022	30 June 2022	Kian Harratt	Huddersfield Town	Port Vale
7 January 2022	30 June 2022	Taylor Richards	Brighton & Hove Albion	Birmingham City
7 January 2022	1 January 2023	(Brazil) Wesley	Aston Villa	(Brazil) Internacional
8 January 2022	30 June 2022	Corie Andrews	AFC Wimbledon	Colchester United
8 January 2022	30 June 2022	James Connolly	(Wales) Cardiff City	Bristol Rovers
8 January 2022	30 June 2022	Ainsley Maitland-Niles	Arsenal	(Italy) Roma
8 January 2022	30 June 2022	Axel Tuanzebe	Manchester United	(Italy) Napoli
10 January 2022	30 June 2022	(Belgium) Rocky Bushiri	Norwich City	(Scotland) Hibernian
10 January 2022	30 June 2022	Jake Hull	Rotherham United	Hartlepool United
10 January 2022	30 June 2022	(Republic of the Congo) Offrande Zanzala	Barrow	Exeter City
11 January 2022	30 June 2022	(Germany) Steven Benda	(Wales) Swansea City	Peterborough United
11 January 2022	30 June 2022	Declan Drysdale	Coventry City	(Scotland) Ross County
11 January 2022	30 June 2022	Taylor Harwood-Bellis	Manchester City	Stoke City
11 January 2022	30 June 2022	Josh Pask	Coventry City	(Wales) Newport County
11 January 2022	30 June 2022	Aaron Ramsey	Aston Villa	Cheltenham Town
11 January 2022	30 June 2022	Sam Sherring	Bournemouth	Cambridge United
11 January 2022	30 June 2022	(Netherlands) Michael Verrips	Sheffield United	(Netherlands) Fortuna Sittard
11 January 2022	30 June 2022	(Scotland) Jamie Walker	(Scotland) Heart of Midlothian	Bradford City
12 January 2022	30 June 2022	Folarin Balogun	Arsenal	Middlesbrough
12 January 2022	30 June 2022	Caleb Chukwuemeka	Aston Villa	(Scotland) Livingston
12 January 2022	30 June 2022	Cody Drameh	Leeds United	(Wales) Cardiff City
12 January 2022	30 June 2022	(Scotland) Stephen Kelly	(Scotland) Rangers	Salford City
12 January 2022	30 June 2022	Jacob Wakeling	Leicester City	Barrow
12 January 2022	30 June 2022	(Australia) Caleb Watts	Southampton	Crawley Town
13 January 2022	30 June 2022	(Republic of Ireland) Cyrus Christie	Fulham	(Wales) Swansea City
13 January 2022	30 June 2022	Romoney Crichlow	Huddersfield Town	Plymouth Argyle
13 January 2022	30 June 2022	(Wales) Liam Cullen	(Wales) Swansea City	Lincoln City
13 January 2022	30 June 2022	Jamie Cumming	Chelsea	MK Dons
13 January 2022	30 June 2022	Paul Downing	Portsmouth	Rochdale
13 January 2022	30 June 2022	(Netherlands) Anwar El Ghazi	Aston Villa	Everton
13 January 2022	30 June 2022	Callum Morton	West Bromwich Albion	Peterborough United
13 January 2022	30 June 2022	Dan Moss	Millwall	Leyton Orient
13 January 2022	30 June 2022	(Republic of Ireland) Lewis Richards	Wolverhampton Wanderers	Harrogate Town
13 January 2022	30 June 2022	James Trafford	Manchester City	Bolton Wanderers
14 January 2022	30 June 2022	(Sweden) Pontus Dahlberg	Watford	Gillingham
14 January 2022	30 June 2022	(Cuba) Onel Hernández	Norwich City	Birmingham City
14 January 2022	30 June 2022	(Lithuania) Tomas Kalinauskas	Barnsley	AFC Wimbledon
14 January 2022	30 June 2022	Kayne Ramsay	Southampton	(Scotland) Ross County
14 January 2022	30 June 2022	(Netherlands) Deyovaisio Zeefuik	(Germany) Hertha BSC	Blackburn Rovers
15 January 2022	30 June 2022	Hayden Carter	Blackburn Rovers	Portsmouth
15 January 2022	30 June 2022	(Scotland) Zak Jules	MK Dons	Fleetwood Town
15 January 2022	30 June 2022	Luke Matheson	Wolverhampton Wanderers	Scunthorpe United
17 January 2022	30 June 2022	Owura Edwards	Bristol City	Colchester United
17 January 2022	30 June 2022	Kion Etete	Tottenham Hotspur	Cheltenham Town
17 January 2022	30 June 2022	Alex Hunt	Sheffield Wednesday	Oldham Athletic
17 January 2022	30 June 2022	Zain Westbrooke	Stevenage	Bristol Rovers
18 January 2022	30 June 2022	(Republic of Ireland) Conor Coventry	West Ham United	MK Dons
18 January 2022	30 June 2022	Matty Daly	Huddersfield Town	Bradford City
18 January 2022	30 June 2022	Tyrese Fornah	Nottingham Forest	Shrewsbury Town
18 January 2022	30 June 2022	Tyler Magloire	Blackburn Rovers	Northampton Town
18 January 2022	30 June 2022	Brooke Norton-Cuffy	Arsenal	Lincoln City
18 January 2022	30 June 2022	(Sweden) Robin Olsen	(Italy) Roma	Aston Villa
18 January 2022	30 June 2022	Tyler Walker	Coventry City	Portsmouth
19 January 2022	30 June 2022	Carl Jenkinson	Nottingham Forest	(Australia) Melbourne City
19 January 2022	30 June 2022	Jordan Storey	Preston North End	Sheffield Wednesday
20 January 2022	30 June 2022	Tyreeq Bakinson	Bristol City	Ipswich Town
20 January 2022	30 June 2022	Tommy Doyle	Manchester City	(Wales) Cardiff City
20 January 2022	30 June 2022	Myles Kenlock	Ipswich Town	Colchester United
20 January 2022	30 June 2022	(Austria) Hannes Wolf	(Germany) Borussia Mönchengladbach	(Wales) Swansea City
21 January 2022	30 June 2022	(Scotland) Oliver Burke	Sheffield United	Millwall
21 January 2022	30 June 2022	(Netherlands) Juan Castillo	Chelsea	Charlton Athletic
21 January 2022	30 June 2022	Nicke Kabamba	Northampton Town	Woking
21 January 2022	30 June 2022	Jaden Philogene	Aston Villa	Stoke City
24 January 2022	30 June 2022	Cameron Archer	Aston Villa	Preston North End
24 January 2022	30 June 2022	Alex Bass	Portsmouth	Bradford City
24 January 2022	30 June 2022	Josh Davison	Charlton Athletic	Swindon Town
24 January 2022	30 June 2022	Ben Dempsey	Charlton Athletic	(Scotland) Ayr United
24 January 2022	30 June 2022	(Estonia) Karl Hein	Arsenal	Reading
24 January 2022	30 June 2022	Tyrese Sinclair	Mansfield Town	Scunthorpe United
25 January 2022	30 June 2022	Tyreece John-Jules	Arsenal	Sheffield Wednesday
25 January 2022	30 June 2022	Dion Sanderson	Wolverhampton Wanderers	Queens Park Rangers
25 January 2022	30 June 2022	Dynel Simeu	Southampton	Carlisle United
26 January 2022	30 June 2022	Jack Clarke	Tottenham Hotspur	Sunderland
26 January 2022	30 June 2022	(Germany) Marcel Hilßner	Coventry City	(Germany) FSV Zwickau
26 January 2022	30 June 2022	Harlee Dean	Birmingham City	Sheffield Wednesday
26 January 2022	30 June 2022	Isaac Fletcher	Middlesbrough	Hartlepool United
26 January 2022	30 June 2022	(Sierra Leone) Idris Kanu	Peterborough United	Northampton Town
26 January 2022	30 June 2022	Ellis Simms	Everton	(Scotland) Heart of Midlothian
26 January 2022	30 June 2022	(United States) Sebastian Soto	Norwich City	(Scotland) Livingston
26 January 2022	30 June 2022	Rob Street	Crystal Palace	(Wales) Newport County
27 January 2022	30 June 2022	(Northern Ireland) Joel Cooper	Oxford United	Port Vale
27 January 2022	30 June 2022	(Ivory Coast) Amad	Manchester United	(Scotland) Rangers
27 January 2022	30 June 2022	Tom Elliott	Salford City	Bradford City
27 January 2022	30 June 2022	Josh Harrop	Preston North End	Fleetwood Town
27 January 2022	30 June 2022	(Czech Republic) Tomáš Holý	Ipswich Town	Port Vale
27 January 2022	30 June 2022	Nile John	Tottenham Hotspur	Charlton Athletic
27 January 2022	30 June 2022	Charlie Kirk	Charlton Athletic	Blackpool
27 January 2022	30 June 2022	(Republic of Ireland) Mipo Odubeko	West Ham United	Doncaster Rovers
27 January 2022	30 June 2022	(Montserrat) Lyle Taylor	Nottingham Forest	Birmingham City
27 January 2022	30 June 2022	Dominic Thompson	Brentford	Ipswich Town
28 January 2022	30 June 2022	Ryan Alebiosu	Arsenal	Crewe Alexandra
28 January 2022	30 June 2022	(Wales) Aaron Amadi-Holloway	Burton Albion	Barrow
28 January 2022	30 June 2022	Louie Barry	Aston Villa	Swindon Town
28 January 2022	30 June 2022	Reece Devine	Manchester United	Walsall
28 January 2022	30 June 2022	(Belgium) Josh Eppiah	Leicester City	Northampton Town
28 January 2022	30 June 2022	Ben Jackson	Huddersfield Town	Doncaster Rovers
28 January 2022	30 June 2022	(Republic of Ireland) Conor Masterson	Queens Park Rangers	Gillingham
28 January 2022	30 June 2022	Kasey McAteer	Leicester City	Forest Green Rovers
28 January 2022	30 June 2023	(South Korea) Jung Sang-bin	Wolverhampton Wanderers	(Switzerland) Grasshopper
29 January 2022	30 June 2022	(Wales) Brandon Cooper	(Wales) Swansea City	Swindon Town
29 January 2022	30 June 2022	Alfie Doughty	Stoke City	(Wales) Cardiff City
29 January 2022	30 June 2022	(Spain) Adama Traoré	Wolverhampton Wanderers	(Spain) Barcelona
29 January 2022	30 June 2022	Joe White	Newcastle United	Hartlepool United
30 January 2022	30 June 2022	Finley Burns	Manchester City	(Wales) Swansea City
30 January 2022	30 June 2022	Jordan Hugill	Norwich City	(Wales) Cardiff City
31 January 2022	30 June 2022	(Argentina) Julián Álvarez	Manchester City	(Argentina) River Plate
31 January 2022	30 June 2022	(Nigeria) Tim Akinola	Arsenal	(Scotland) Dundee United
31 January 2022	30 June 2022	Elliot Anderson	Newcastle United	Bristol Rovers
31 January 2022	30 June 2022	Tino Anjorin	Chelsea	Huddersfield Town
31 January 2022	30 June 2022	(Northern Ireland) Amrit Bansal-McNulty	Queens Park Rangers	Crawley Town
31 January 2022	30 June 2022	(Morocco) Amine Bassi	(France) Metz	Barnsley
31 January 2022	30 June 2022	(Australia) Nicholas Bilokapic	Huddersfield Town	Hartlepool United
31 January 2022	30 June 2022	Matthew Bondswell	Newcastle United	Shrewsbury Town
31 January 2022	30 June 2022	(Northern Ireland) Ciaron Brown	(Wales) Cardiff City	Oxford United
31 January 2022	30 June 2022	Daniel Butterworth	Blackburn Rovers	Fleetwood Town
31 January 2022	30 June 2022	Todd Cantwell	Norwich City	Bournemouth
31 January 2022	30 June 2022	Harry Chapman	Blackburn Rovers	Burton Albion
31 January 2022	30 June 2022	Bailey Clements	Ipswich Town	Stevenage
31 January 2022	30 June 2022	Sam Cosgrove	Shrewsbury Town	AFC Wimbledon
31 January 2022	30 June 2022	Hayden Coulson	Middlesbrough	Peterborough United
31 January 2022	30 June 2022	Vontae Daley-Campbell	Leicester City	(Scotland) Dundee
31 January 2022	30 June 2022	(Republic of Ireland) Ryan Delaney	Morecambe	Scunthorpe United
31 January 2022	30 June 2022	Nathan Delfouneso	Bolton Wanderers	Bradford City
31 January 2022	30 June 2022	(Finland) Marcus Forss	Brentford	Hull City
31 January 2022	30 June 2022	(Spain) Bryan Gil	Tottenham Hotspur	(Spain) Valencia
31 January 2022	30 June 2022	Ryan Giles	Wolverhampton Wanderers	Blackburn Rovers
31 January 2022	30 June 2022	Charlie Goode	Brentford	Sheffield United
31 January 2022	30 June 2022	Rekeem Harper	Ipswich Town	Crewe Alexandra
31 January 2022	30 June 2022	(Republic of Ireland) Jeff Hendrick	Newcastle United	Queens Park Rangers
31 January 2022	30 June 2022	Sam Hornby	Bradford City	Colchester United
31 January 2022	30 June 2022	Isaac Hutchinson	Derby County	Crawley Town
31 January 2022	30 June 2022	(Uganda) Uche Ikpeazu	Middlesbrough	(Wales) Cardiff City
31 January 2022	30 June 2022	Tom Ince	Stoke City	Reading
31 January 2022	30 June 2022	(Bulgaria) Sylvester Jasper	Fulham	(Scotland) Hibernian
31 January 2022	30 June 2022	(Northern Ireland) Jordan Jones	Wigan Athletic	(Scotland) St Mirren
31 January 2022	30 June 2022	(Portugal) Bruno Jordão	Wolverhampton Wanderers	(Switzerland) Grasshopper
31 January 2022	30 June 2022	Kaine Kesler	Aston Villa	MK Dons
31 January 2022	30 June 2022	(Czech Republic) Matěj Kovář	Manchester United	Burton Albion
31 January 2022	30 June 2022	(Sweden) Dejan Kulusevski	(Italy) Juventus	Tottenham Hotspur
31 January 2022	30 June 2022	(Argentina) Giovani Lo Celso	Tottenham Hotspur	(Spain) Villarreal
31 January 2022	30 June 2022	Matty Longstaff	Newcastle United	Mansfield Town
31 January 2022	30 June 2022	(Democratic Republic of the Congo) Beryly Lubala	Blackpool	Northampton Town
31 January 2022	30 June 2022	(Nigeria) Josh Maja	(France) Bordeaux	Stoke City
31 January 2022	30 June 2022	Bryn Morris	Burton Albion	Hartlepool United
31 January 2022	30 June 2022	Liam Moore	Reading	Stoke City
31 January 2022	30 June 2022	(France) Lys Mousset	Sheffield United	(Italy) Salernitana
31 January 2022	30 June 2022	(Scotland) Jamie Murphy	(Scotland) Hibernian	Mansfield Town
31 January 2022	30 June 2022	(France) Tanguy Ndombele	Tottenham Hotspur	(France) Lyon
31 January 2022	30 June 2022	Frank Nouble	Colchester United	Leyton Orient
31 January 2022	30 June 2022	Jordi Osei-Tutu	Arsenal	Rotherham United
31 January 2022	30 June 2022	Kieran Phillips	Huddersfield Town	Exeter City
31 January 2022	30 June 2022	Nathaniel Phillips	Liverpool	Bournemouth
31 January 2022	30 June 2022	Luke Plange	Crystal Palace	Derby County
31 January 2022	30 June 2022	(Romania) George Pușcaș	Reading	(Italy) Pisa
31 January 2022	30 June 2022	Rekeil Pyke	Shrewsbury Town	Scunthorpe United
31 January 2022	30 June 2022	(Denmark) Luka Racic	Brentford	(Denmark) HB Køge
31 January 2022	30 June 2022	George Ray	Exeter City	Leyton Orient
31 January 2022	30 June 2022	(Republic of Ireland) Glen Rea	Luton Town	Wigan Athletic
31 January 2022	30 June 2022	Mitchell Roberts	Birmingham City	Carlisle United
31 January 2022	30 June 2022	Blaine Rowe	Coventry City	(Scotland) Ayr United
31 January 2022	30 June 2022	(Spain) Iván Sánchez	Birmingham City	(Spain) Real Valladolid
31 January 2022	30 June 2022	Tom Sang	Cardiff City	(Scotland) St Johnstone
31 January 2022	30 June 2022	Christian Saydee	Bournemouth	Hartlepool United
31 January 2022	30 June 2022	(Iran) Allahyar Sayyadmanesh	(Turkey) Fenerbahçe	Hull City
31 January 2022	30 June 2022	Steven Sessegnon	Fulham	Plymouth Argyle
31 January 2022	30 June 2022	Jamie Soule	West Bromwich Albion	Cheltenham Town
31 January 2022	30 June 2022	Jed Steer	Aston Villa	Luton Town
31 January 2022	30 June 2022	Matt Targett	Aston Villa	Newcastle United
31 January 2022	30 June 2022	(France) Jean-Pierre Tiehi	Fulham	(France) Rodez
31 January 2022	30 June 2022	(Switzerland) Lorent Tolaj	Brighton & Hove Albion	Cambridge United
31 January 2022	30 June 2022	Joe Tomlinson	Peterborough United	Swindon Town
31 January 2022	30 June 2022	(United States) Auston Trusty	Arsenal	(United States) Colorado Rapids
31 January 2022	30 June 2022	(Germany) Deniz Undav	Brighton & Hove Albion	(Belgium) Union SG
31 January 2022	30 June 2022	(Netherlands) Donny van de Beek	Manchester United	Everton
31 January 2022	30 June 2022	Liam Walsh	(Wales) Swansea City	Hull City
31 January 2022	30 June 2022	Lewis Warrington	Everton	Tranmere Rovers
31 January 2022	30 June 2022	(Wales) Neco Williams	Liverpool	Fulham
31 January 2022	30 June 2022	Owen Windsor	West Bromwich Albion	Carlisle United
31 January 2022	30 June 2022	Freddie Woodman	Newcastle United	Bournemouth
31 January 2022	30 June 2022	Tyreik Wright	Aston Villa	Colchester United
1 February 2022	30 June 2022	Mason Burstow	Chelsea	Charlton Athletic
1 February 2022	30 June 2022	Luke Freeman	Sheffield United	Millwall
1 February 2022	30 June 2022	(Portugal) Domingos Quina	Watford	Barnsley
1 February 2022	30 June 2022	Jack Young	Newcastle United	Wycombe Wanderers
8 February 2022	30 June 2022	(Egypt) Trézéguet	Aston Villa	(Turkey) İstanbul Başakşehir
9 February 2022	30 June 2022	Zeno Ibsen Rossi	Bournemouth	(Scotland) Dundee
17 February 2022	1 January 2023	Tom Edwards	Stoke City	(United States) New York Red Bulls
21 February 2022	30 June 2022	(Ivory Coast) Jean-Philippe Gbamin	Everton	(Russia) CSKA Moscow
28 February 2022	1 January 2023	Ashley Fletcher	Watford	(United States) New York Red Bulls
