= 2025–26 Reading F.C. season =

155th season in existence of Reading FC

Reading
2025–26 season
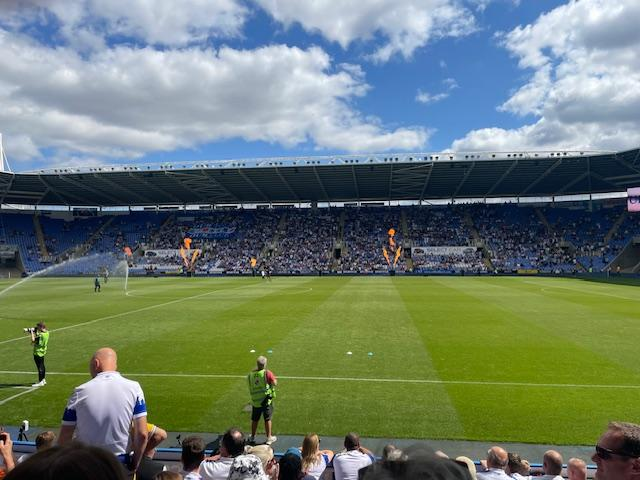
- The Madjeski Stadium ahead of the match between Reading and Huddersfield Town on 9 August 2025
- Owner: Redwood Holdings
- Manager: Noel Hunt (until 26 October); Leam Richardson (from 28 October)
- Stadium: Madejski Stadium
- League One: 12th
- FA Cup: First round vs Carlisle United
- EFL Cup: Third round vs Wrexham
- EFL Trophy: Group stage
- Top goalscorer: League: Jack Marriott (16); All: Jack Marriott (17)
- Highest home attendance: 17,144 (vs Lincoln City, 6 April 2025, League One)
- Lowest home attendance: 1,247 (vs West Ham United U21, 30 September 2025, EFL Trophy)
- Average home league attendance: 12,194
| Home colours | Away colours |
- All statistics correct as of 2 May 2026.

The 2025–26 season is Reading's 155th and their third consecutive season in EFL League One. They are only competing in the domestic league now following their elimination from the EFL Trophy in the group stage after rivals Swindon Town beat Milton Keynes Dons 4–0. They also competed in the EFL Cup but were eliminated in the third round losing 2–0 away to EFL Championship club Wrexham and the FA Cup and were eliminated in the first round losing 3–2 after extra time at home to Enterprise National League club Carlisle United. This is Reading's first season under the ownership of Redwood Holdings, and was the first full season under the management of former player Noel Hunt who replaced former manager Rubén Sellés on 6 December 2024. On 26 October 2025, Reading sacked former player and head coach Noel Hunt with 3 wins in 14 matches after a 1–1 draw at home to Doncaster Rovers on 25 October 2025. Two days later, former Wigan Athletic and Rotherham United manager Leam Richardson was appointed as the new head coach.

== Season events ==
=== Pre-season ===
Prior to the last match of the previous season, a 4–2 defeat to Barnsley at home, Reading announced that a sale in principle of the club, stadium, and training ground to Rob Couhig's Redwood Holdings Limited. On 14 May 2025, Reading and the EFL confirmed that Redwood Holdings Limited had completed their takeover of the club.

On 16 May, Reading released their retained and released list, with David Button, Harlee Dean, Tom Carroll, Coniah Boyce-Clarke, Adrian Akande, Louie Holzman, Jack Senga, Charlie Wellens, James Sharlott, Kai Source and Verrell George all leaving the club at the end of their contracts on 30 June. Reading confirmed that they had activated one-year extension clauses with Mamadi Camará, Tom Norcott, Joseph Barough, Boyd Beacroft and Mathew Rowley, whilst new contracts had been offered to Michael Craig, Jeriel Dorsett, Kelvin Ehibhatiomhan, Abraham Kanu, Amadou Mbengue, Joel Pereira, Tivonge Rushesha, Michael Stickland, Basil Tuma, Jayden Wareham, Andy Yiadom, John Clarke, John Ryan, Jeremiah Okine-Peters, Ashqar Ahmed. John Clarke, John Ryan, Andy Yiadom and Michael Stickland signed new one-year contracts with the club before the end of June.

On 23 May, Reading announced that they had signed a new contract with club captain Lewis Wing, keeping him at the club until the summer of 2028.

On 28 May, Reading announced that former Wycombe Wanderers and Wales under-21 international defender Joe Jacobson joined the club to work alongside new chairman and owner Rob Couhig as the co-CEO (chief executive officer) and would join the recruitment department alongside manager Noel Hunt and Head of Recruitment Brian Carey.

On 2 June, Reading announced that assistant manager Nigel Gibbs would join newly appointed Ryan Mason at EFL Championship club West Bromwich Albion with immediate effect with Rob Couhig and Noel Hunt looking for a replacement in the not-so-distant future.

On 17 June, Reading announced the signing of Paudie O'Connor to a four-year contract, joining on a free transfer from fellow EFL League One club Lincoln City on 1 July once his contract expired.

On 19 June, Reading released their home kit for the upcoming season which is inspired by the former Biscuit Factory in Reading (Huntley & Palmers) near Forbury Gardens with the design on the tins being featured on the tops.

On 25 June, Reading announced the signing of Jack Stevens to a two-year contract, joining on a free transfer from newly-relegated EFL League Two club Cambridge United on 1 July once his contract expired.

On 25 June, Reading announced that the players would return for pre-season training at Bearwood Park Training Ground for the first time under Noel Hunt.

On 26 June, Reading confirmed that both Amadou Mbengue and Jayden Wareham had turned down new contracts with the club, and would depart at the end of their contracts on 30 June.

On 26 June, Reading announced that Aliya Capital Partners had brought a minority stake in Dogwood Football LLC and that Ross Kestin had joined the Reading FC board as a director.

On 26 June, the day of the EFL League One fixture release, Reading announced that they would travel to Fota Island, in Cork, Republic of Ireland for a pre-season training camp between 15 and 18 July 2025. Followed by a pre-season friendly against 2024–25 UEFA Europa League winners Tottenham Hotspur at Madejski Stadium on 19 July 2025.

=== July ===
On 1 July, Reading announced new one-year contracts with Tivonge Rushesha and Jeriel Dorsett. With new contracts announced the next day for Ashqar Ahmed, Jacob Borgnis, Carter Bowdery, Phillip Duah, Sam Harrison, Abraham Kanu, Shay Spencer, Basil Tuma and Josh Welland. Ashqar Ahmed and Josh Welland both signed two-year contracts whilst Jacob Borgnis, Carter Bowdery, Phillip Duah, Sam Harrison, Abraham Kanu, Shay Spencer and Basil Tuma all signed one-year deals.

On 4 July, Reading announced that Jeremiah Okine-Peters and Luke Howard had both signed new one-year contracts with the club, and that they had signed Matty Jacob on loan from EFL Championship club Hull City for the season. Also on the same day, Reading confirmed that Michael Craig had left the club after turning down a new contract to sign with fellow EFL League One club Leyton Orient, with Leyton Orient paying an undisclosed fee to avoid a compensation hearing.

On 4 July, Sky Sports announced the matches that will be shown on TV for the first two months of the season with Reading's first match of the season away to Lincoln City (on 2 August 2025), their first home match against Huddersfield Town (on 9 August 2025) and their away match against Bolton Wanderers (on 20 August 2025).

On 7 July, Reading announced the season-long loan signings of Finley Burns from Manchester City and Mark O'Mahony from Brighton & Hove Albion.

On 11 July, Scott Marshall returned to Reading as Assistant First Team Manager to Noel Hunt.

On 15 July, Reading travelled to Cork in the Republic of Ireland for a three-day training camp for the first time since the 2020–21 season.

On 16 July, Reading announced that EFL Championship club and local rivals Oxford United had pulled out of their scheduled friendly with the Royals set for 22 July and that National League South club Slough Town would replace them with the reason for Oxford's reason for cancellation being that they needed to prioritise an evening fixture against Mansfield Town.

On 18 July, Reading released their away kit for the upcoming season which is an orange kit inspired by Reading Town Hall with the outline of the town hall in the background of the kit.

On 19 July, Tottenham Hotspur beat Reading 2-0 at the Madejski Stadium in their first home pre-season friendly in front of a sold-out crowd for the first time since February 2022.

On 22 July, Reading announced the signing of Daniel Kyerewaa on a free-transfer following his departure from 2.Bundesliga club Preußen Münster earlier in the summer, to a two-year contract.

On 23 July, Reading announced the signing of Liam Fraser on a free-transfer following his departure from newly-relegated EFL League Two club Crawley Town earlier in the summer.

On 24 July, Reading confirmed that Abraham Kanu had joined National League club Forest Green Rovers – who are currently managed by former Manchester United and Wales midfielder and the father of Royals midfielder Charlie Savage, Robbie Savage – on a season-long loan deal, and that Kelvin Ehibhatiomhan had signed a new two-year contract with the club.

On 25 July, The Portsmouth News reported that Reading's top scorer from the previous season Harvey Knibbs had agreed a transfer to EFL Championship club Portsmouth. Knibbs played against Reading in the Royals' final friendly the following day with Portsmouth winning 4–0. Following the match Reading manager Noel Hunt said this about the future of Harvey Knibbs after he had not played a single minute of pre-season: "Harvey [Knibbs] pulled himself out today, there's things progressing in the background with a club in the league above [the Championship]. I'm aware there was a fresh bid in this morning".

On 31 July, Reading manager Noel Hunt announced in a club interview that Harvey Knibbs' persecutive move to Charlton Athletic had fallen through after an agreement between the clubs could not be reached.

On 31 July, Noel Hunt announced that Lewis Wing had been made Club Captain, with Joel Pereira being named as Vice-Captain, taking over from Andy Yiadom. Later the same day, Reading announced the signing of Paddy Lane from Portsmouth for an undisclosed fee, on a contract until 2028.

=== August ===
On 1 August, Reading confirmed that Harvey Knibbs had left the club, to sign for EFL Championship club Charlton Athletic for an undisclosed fee believed to be £1.8 million.

On 2 August, Ahead of their first match of the season away to Lincoln City at Sincil Bank, Reading announced their squad numbers for the upcoming season with the new signings squad numbers being as follows: Matty Jacob (number 5), Liam Fraser (number 6), Daniel Kyerewaa (number 11), Finley Burns (number 12), Paudie O'Connor (number 15), Mark O'Mahony (number 20), Jack Stevens (number 25) and Paddy Lane (number 32). Other notable new squad numbers saw Andre Garcia move from number 30 to number 19 and Michael Stickland move from number 38 to number 22. The number 7 shirt worn by Harvey Knibbs until his move to Charlton Athletic had been left vacant until the signing of Jack Marriott later in the window. The Royals fans have been given the number 13 shirt. Reading went on to lose their opening game 2–0 to Lincoln City leaving Reading in 23rd place. Also on 2 August, Beaconsfield Town announced the loan signing of Josh Welland.

On 4 August, Reading announced three signings for their U21 team, with David Hicks and Miles Obodo signing one-year contracts, and Reece Evans signing a two-year contract. Later the same day, Reading announced the season-long loan signing of Kamari Doyle from Premier League club Brighton & Hove Albion.

On 8 August, Tom Norcott joined Woking on a two-month youth loan deal.

On 12 August, Reading travelled to Fratton Park to face EFL Championship club Portsmouth in the first round of the EFL Cup. Reading won 2–1 with Andre Garica opening the scoring for the visitors in the 35th minute – this Reading's first goal of the season in all competitions and Kelvin Ehibhatiomhan then doubled their lead in the 38th minute. Olutayo Singerr then pulled a goal back for the hosts in the 93rd minute. This result gave the Royals their first win of the season in all competitions. The next day, Reading were drawn at home to fellow League One club AFC Wimbledon in the second round of the EFL Cup with the match set to be played on 26 August 2025.

On 14 August, Reading announced the signing of former AFC Bournemouth Academy scholar Jay Williams to their Under 21 squad on a one-year contract.

On 15 August, Reading announced the signing of Derrick Williams to a two-year contract, joining on a free transfer from Major League Soccer (MLS) Atlanta United with Atlanta United retaining a percentage of any future fee.

On 16 August, Reading hosted newly promoted AFC Wimbledon at the Madejski Stadium. Reading lost 2–1 and left the Royals rock bottom in 24th place with 0 points. This match saw Charlie Savage make his 100th Royals appearance and also Reading lose each of their first three fixtures of a league campaign for the first time since the 2018–19 season in the EFL Championship.

On 20 August, gained their first point of the season and move up to 21st place after a 1-1 draw against Bolton Wanderers. The Reading goal was Andre Garica's first professional league goal.

On 24 August, Reading manager Noel Hunt gave an in-depth explanation about the long-running saga to sign a forward and saying that he still wants 3 to 4 more players before the transfer deadline on 1 September 2025 at 7 pm and 2 before the EFL Cup match against AFC Wimbledon on 26 August. He said to James Earnshaw of the Reading Chronicle: "There are a couple of elements. Teams want money for players and players want big money. We all know that the salaries in League One have shifted greatly in the last year-and-a-half to two years. Between clubs we're negotiating to get players in, between players we're negotiating to get them in. Hopefully we have one or two done before Tuesday [26 August 2025] – whether or not they can play on Tuesday [against AFC Wimbledon in the EFL Cup] is another thing. We are really hopeful".

On 26 August, Reading announced the signing of Jack Marriott to a three-year contract, joining from newly-promoted EFL Championship club Wrexham – who are co-owned by Canadian actor Ryan Reynolds and American actor Rob McElhenney with Jack Marriott helping Wrexham to promotion in the previous season as runners-up to league champions Birmingham City. Later on the same day, Reading played fellow League One club AFC Wimbledon in the second round of the EFL Cup at the Madejski Stadium. Reading won 2–1 with Liam Fraser opening the scoring for the hosts in the 24th minute with a long-range strike with his first Royals goal and Omar Bugiel then equalised for the visitors in the 26th minute. Mamadi Camará then put the Royals ahead in the 70th minute to qualify them for the third round for the first time since the 2019–20 season.

On 26 August, Reading announced the signing of Matt Ritchie to a two-year contract, on a free transfer after his contract at EFL Championship club Portsmouth was terminated.

On 27 August, Reading was drawn away to EFL Championship club Wrexham in the third round of the EFL Cup with the match set to be played on 23 September 2025 with new signing Jack Marriott unable to play in the match due to being cup-tied having played for Wrexham in earlier rounds.

On 29 August, Readings home fixture against Northampton Town was postponed due to international call ups for Northampton Town.

On 30 August, Reading played newly promoted Port Vale at the Madejski Stadium still seeking their first victory of the league season after 6 matches. Reading won 1–0 with manager Noel Hunt being sent-off by referee Thomas Parsons around the 50th minute and Paddy Lane then opening the scoring for the hosts in the 67th minute with a long-range strike for his first Royals goal. This result saw Reading claim their first win of the season to move them up to 17th in the table and it also saw Joel Pereira claim his first clean sheet of the season. New signing Jack Marriott made his debut in this match to become the 1,500th player to represent the Royals when he came on in the 62nd minute for Mark O'Mahony.

=== September ===
On 1 September, Reading confirmed the signing of Sean Patton from Derry City, to a two-year contract for an undisclosed fee.

On 2 September, Reading travelled to the County Ground to face M4 rivals Swindon Town in the group stage of the EFL Trophy with Reading losing 3–2 with Princewill Ehibhatiomhan – the brother of Kelvin Ehibhatiomhan – opening the scoring for Swindon in the 11th minute and new signing Ollie Palmer then doubled their lead in the 24th minute. However, Swindon goalkeeper Lewis Ward then pulled a goal back for Reading in the 36th minute with an own goal following a long-range strike by Liam Fraser and another new signing Jack Marriott then equalised for the Royals in the 44th minute with first goal for the club. Swindon captain Will Wright then won it for The Robins in the 47th minute with a free-kick.

On 9 September, it was announced that Reading manager Noel Hunt had been fined £1,000 for misconduct after being sent-off in their previous match over Port Vale at the Madejski Stadium. A Football Association statement said that Noel Hunt admitted the charge.

On 10 September, Reading announced that their postponed home game against Northampton Town, originally scheduled for 6 September but postponed due to international call ups, had been rearranged for 20:00hrs on 21 October.

On 12 September, it was announced that club captain Lewis Wing had been nominated for the EFL League One Goal of the Month award for August for his strike against AFC Wimbledon alongside Charlie Webster for Burton Albion against Mansfield Town and former Reading player Oliver Norwood for Stockport County against Burton Albion.

On 20 September, Reading hosted Leyton Orient at the Madejski Stadium, as part of their Family Day, winning 2–1. Liam Fraser scored the winning goal and his first league goal for the Royals in the 79th minute. This result moved Reading out of the relegation zone and up to 20th place on 8 points from 8 matches.

On 23 September, Reading travelled to Wales and the STōK Cae Ras to face EFL Championship club Wrexham in the third round of the EFL Cup. Reading lost 2–0 with Nathan Broadhead scoring a brace to eliminate the Royals at the third round stage. This match saw Andre Garica make his 50th Royals appearance.

On 27 September, Reading announced that chairman and owner Rob Couhig would be hosting a live Q&A session at an unknown venue on 2 October. On 29 September, the venue was announced as the Madejski Stadium between 7:30 pm and 8:30 pm with fans submitting questions prior to the event via the Reading website.

On 30 September, Reading won 3-1 against Premier League club West Ham United's under-21s at the Madejski Stadium in their second group match of the EFL Trophy.

The Q&A with owner and chairman Rob Couhig was held at the Madejski Stadium and hosted by RoyalsTV presenter Phil Catchpole where Rob Couhig was asked about topics ranging from the future of manager Noel Hunt to stadium upgrades and the future of the women's team. He also quizzed on the Reading academy, if he regrets buying the club and the pyrotechnics at most home matches saying that "he will blow the roof of the Madejski Stadium in November" and if there would be a documentary on the club about the takeover.

=== October ===
On 7 October, Reading hosted EFL League Two club Milton Keynes Dons at the Madejski Stadium in their final group stage match of the EFL Trophy. Reading won 1–0 with Sean Patton opening the scoring for the hosts in the 88th minute with his first goal for Reading. However, Reading failed to qualify for the Round of 32 on goal difference(+2 Reading, +3 West Ham Utd U21, +4 Swindon Town).

On 8 October, Reading announced that Jack Marriott had been nominated for EFL League One Player of the Month award for September alongside Devante Cole (Port Vale), Josh Neufville (Bradford City) and Harvey White (Stevenage). Later on the same day, Reading announced that there would be themed matchdays at the Madejski Stadium throughout the rest of the current season such as: Fireworks night on 22 November against Rotherham United, then a Christmas matchday on 18 December against Luton Town, then a Louisiana Day on 24 January against Barnsley – with Rob Couhig and Todd Trosclair in attendance, then Valentine's Day on 14 February against Rob Couhig's former club Wycombe Wanderers, then Mardi Gras on 17 February against Bolton Wanderers, then 106 Day on 28 March against Wigan Athletic to celebrate the 20-year anniversary of the Royals breaking the EFL Championship promotion points record in the 2005/06 season, Easter on 6 April against Lincoln City and Final Day on 2 May against Blackpool.

On 15 October, Reading announced that Tom Norcott had returned to the club from his loan spell with Woking.

On 18 October, Reading travelled to Wales and the Welsh capital to visit the Cardiff City Stadium to face promotion-chasing and newly relegated Cardiff City. Reading lost 2–1 with Royals captain Lewis Wing opening the scoring for the visitors in the 38th minute with a long-range strike following an assist from Matt Ritchie and then Omari Kellyman equalised for the hosts in the 49th minute after an assist from Ronan Kpakio. Yousef Salech then put the Bluebirds ahead in the 65th minute after another assist from Ronan Kpakio. This result left Reading third-from-bottom of the League One table on 11 points from 12 matches. Many Royals fans and manager Noel Hunt felt that Reading should have won the match though.

On 21 October, Reading hosted Northampton Town at the Madejski Stadium in their rearranged match from 6 September 2025. Reading won 1–0 with Kelvin Ehibhatiomhan opening the scoring for the hosts in the 65th minute after a cross from Paddy Lane with the sole goal of the match and his first league goal of the season. This meant that Reading got up to 16th place on 14 points from 13 matches played and out of the relegation zone for the third time that season.

On 26 October, Reading announced that Head Coach Noel Hunt had been relieved of his duties following a 1–1 home draw against Doncaster Rovers following a play-off push towards the conclusion of the previous season with the Royals ultimately finishing 3 points off the play-off places with Leyton Orient finishing ahead of them. To start this season it took until 30 September 2025 at home to Port Vale for Reading to get their first victory of the campaign with Noel Hunt leaving Reading 19th in the table on 15 points two points off the relegation zone with Port Vale and Plymouth Argyle both having a match-in-hand on Reading. Noel Hunt left the Royals with a record of just three wins in 14 games this season. He was appointed to replace Rubén Sellés who departed for EFL Championship club Hull City on 6 December 2024 so Noel Hunt only lasted 324 days in charge of Reading. The two highly touted replacements for Noel Hunt are former Wycombe Wanderers managers Gareth Ainsworth – who is currently in charge of EFL League Two club Gillingham and Matt Bloomfield – who was recently sacked by fellow EFL League One club Luton Town – with their links to current Reading owner and chairman Rob Couhig.

On 27 October, it emerged that former Wycombe Wanderers and Luton Town manager Matt Bloomfield pulled out of the race to replace Noel Hunt with it later emerging that former Rotherham United and Wigan Athletic manager Leam Richardson was in talks to become the new Royals manager – he has been without a club since leaving the Millers in the 2023–24 season with them being relegated to EFL League One at the conclusion of that season with him departing in April 2024. Leam Richardson has previously won the EFL League One title once with Wigan Athletic in the 2021–22 season; Sky Bet League One Manager of the 2021-22 Season; LMA League One Manager of the Season for the 2021–22 campaign and the EFL League Two title with Chesterfield as assistant manager to Paul Cook in the 2013–14 season.

On 28 October, Reading announced that former Wigan Athletic and Rotherham United manager Leam Richardson had been named the new Royals head coach on a two-year contract until 30 June 2027 following his stint at Rotherham United which ended on 17 April 2024 with Rotherham United relegated at the end of that campaign. This was the first time Reading hired a permanent manager who was won the league that they are currently competing in since Ian Porterfield was hired in 1989. He has previously worked as assistant manager to Paul Cook at Portsmouth, Chesterfield and Accrington Stanley – the latter was where Leam Richardson transitioned from a player to a coach and his playing career began at Blackburn Rovers before he made more than 100 appearances for Accrington Stanley and also played for Blackpool 84 times. BBC Radio Berkshire's Reading commentator Tim Dellor said this about Leam Richardson's appointment: "He will need to be a miracle worker to get the current squad close to the EFL Championship this season. With only 14 games of the season gone anything could still happen but with no fit recognised strikers [with Jack Marriott currently nursing a hamstring injury], central defenders who are injury prone [Paudie O'Connor and Derrick Williams have both recently returned from major injuries], an injured first-choice goalkeeper [Joel Pereira is currently out with an injury he picked up during the Exeter City match earlier this month], and most of the new recruits struggling to make a positive impact, expectations ought to be modest". Reading owner and chairman Rob Couhig said this about appointing Leam Richardson as the new Royals manager: "I have admired Leam [Richardson] for some time. He is a coach and leader who embodies exactly the qualities we want at Reading Football Club – hard work, diligence, organisation and an absolute commitment to improving players. He achieved promotion from [EFL] League One in extremely difficult circumstances and proved he can build success. He is humble, he is driven, and he builds strong, honest cultures – something I know Royals fans value and respect. Leam [Richardson] knows this division, he knows what a winning dressing room looks like and he understands the standards required to get there. He is hungry, ambitious and determined to move this football club forward. We are delighted to welcome him [Leam Richardson] to Reading". The statement finished by confirming that Danny Schofield and James Beattie have joined his backroom team at Bearwood Park. Later on the same day, Reading confirmed that assistant first team manager Scott Marshall had left the club after joining the Royals at the beginning of the season to join Noel Hunt's backroom team to replace the outgoing Nigel Gibbs who left to join former Tottenham Hotspur player and manager Ryan Mason at West Bromwich Albion. He returned for a second spell having previously led our under-23s between 2017 and 2020 and briefly served as caretaker manager in 2018. He departs as part of Reading's backroom staff changes.

=== November ===
On 1 November, Reading lost 3–2 after extra time to Enterprise National League club Carlisle United at the Madejski Stadium, eliminating the Royals in the First Round Proper of the FA Cup, in what was Leam Richardson's first match in charge.

On 3 November, Reading announced that Rob Kelly had joined Leam Richardson's coaching staff as Assistant First-Team Manager having previously worked with Leam Richardson at Wigan Athletic and he joins from EFL League Two club Barrow. Rob Kelly was notably named EFL Championship Manager of the Month for March 2006 during his spell in charge of Leicester City.

On 5 November, Reading announced the signing of Randell Williams on a short-term contract until January 2026 after leaving fellow EFL League One club Leyton Orient during the previous season where he reached the 2024–25 EFL League One play-off semi-finals.

On 6 November, Reading hosted Stevenage at the Madejski Stadium in Leam Richardson's first home league match in charge of the Royals and Chem Campbell face-off against the team he spent last on loan from Wolverhampton Wanderers at. Reading won 1–0 with Charlie Savage opening the scoring in his 100th Royals league appearance in this match. The win moved Reading up to 12th in the league table on 18 points with a goal difference of −3 – seven points off AFC Wimbledon in 6th place and ten points off leaders Stockport County.

On 7 November, Sky Sports announced the matches that will be shown on TV from 9 January 2026 until 2 March 2026 with Reading's Valentine's Day themed match against Berkshire – Buckinghamshire rivals, Rob Couhig derby rivals and Lewis Wing & Joe Jacobson derby rivals Wycombe Wanderers at the Madejski Stadium on 14 February 2026 to be shown on Sky Sports+ with kick-off moving from 3 pm to 12:30 pm.

On 8 November, Reading announced that Matthew Rowley had joined Hampton & Richmond Borough on loan until 3 January 2026.

On 11 November, Reading announced that Tom Norcott had joined Enfield Town on loan until 31 January 2026 which would be his second loan of the campaign following his previous short stint at Woking.

On 14 November, Reading announced that Jacob Borgnis had joined Slough Town on loan until 13 December 2025.

On 15 November, Reading were due to travel to The Brick Community Stadium to play Wigan Athletic seeking back-to-back victories for the first time this season. However, on 7 November, Reading announced that the match had been postponed due to international call-ups in the Royals squad and that a date for the re-arranged match would be announced soon.

On 12 November, Reading announced the re-signed of academy graduate Andy Rinomhota to a contract until the end of the current season following his release from fellow EFL League One club Cardiff City on 30 June 2025. He made 139 Royals appearances in his first spell at the club also winning the 2018–19 Player of the Season award and becoming the 44th Reading academy graduate in the process.

On 19 November, Reading announced that the Fireworks Spectacular show following the match against Rotherham United would take place immediately after the final whistle with Andy Hubble of Star Fireworks telling RoyalsTV presenter Phil Catchpole: "We have done things with Rob [Couhig] before, but we have done things at stadiums before and we're local, Reading-based, so it's great to be here on home ground [at Madejski Stadium. As soon as the final whistle goes, we have a countdown, and the plans are for a plunger and then the fireworks kicks off ... Rob [Couhig] loves his fireworks, so he only wants the best. The pressure is on, but we are trying to keep it fresh and new..." This came off after a Royals supporter asked Rob Couhig at the recent fans Q&A session "Why are there fireworks at every home match?" with Rob Couhig replying "Reading will blow the roof off with fireworks in November. I love fireworks".

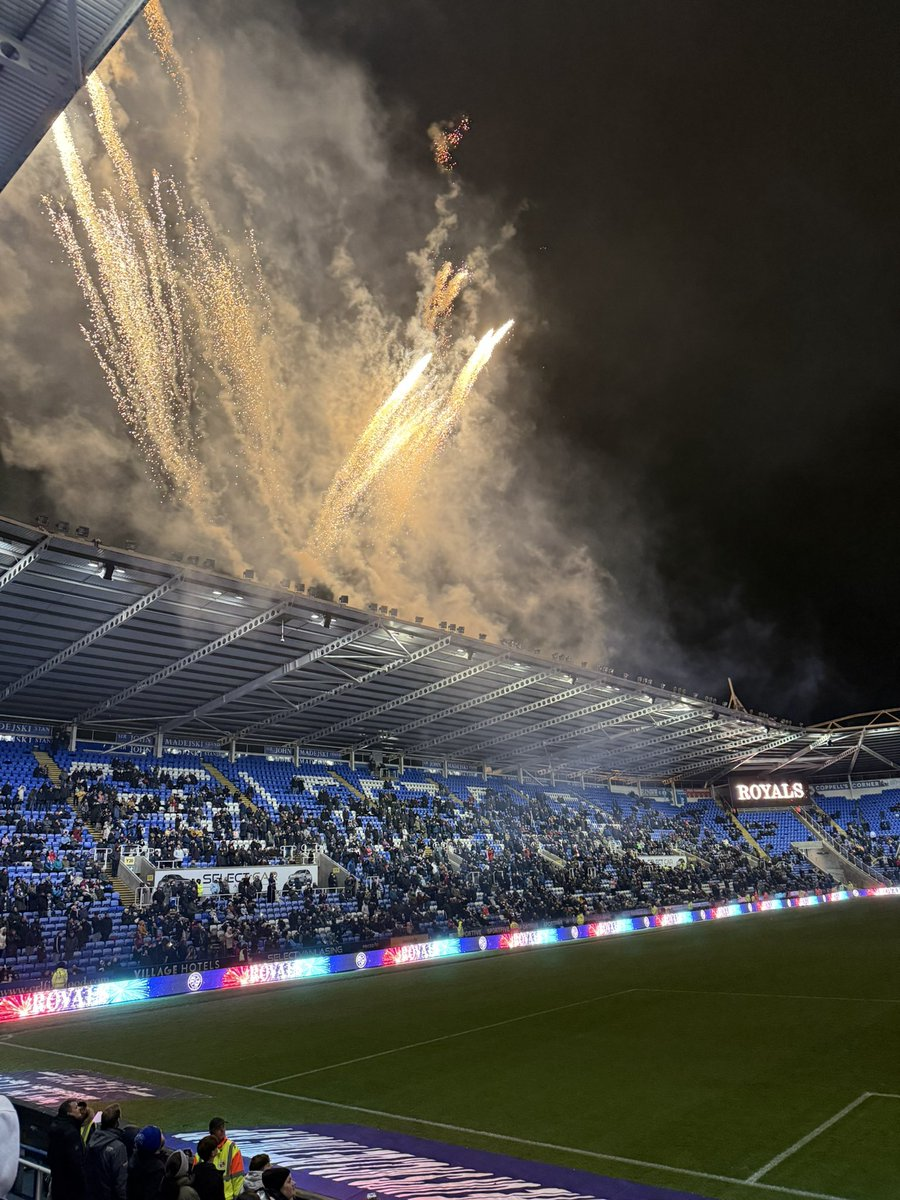
The Fireworks show following the league match against Rotherham United at Madejski Stadium on 22 November 2025

On 22 November, Reading hosted Rotherham United in the Firework themed matchday at The Madejski Stadium seeking back-to-back victories for the first time this season. The match saw new Royals First-Team Manager Leam Richardson face-off against his former club for the first time since leaving The Millers in 2024. New signing Randell Williams made his first start for the Royals in this match, in which Reading drew 1–1.

On 29 November, Reading travelled to Bloomfield Road to face Blackpool seeking their first away win since the 2–0 victory over Bristol Rovers in their penultimate match of the previous season and their first away victory over Blackpool since a 2–0 win in the 2019–20 FA Cup third round. Reading won 3–0 and gave the Royals their first away victory of the season; their first league win at Bloomfield Road since the 2000–01 season; their first clean sheet since the 1–0 victory over Stevenage at the beginning of November 2025 and their first victory by more than 2 goals in the league since the 5–1 away victory over Mansfield Town towards the end of the previous season. This result moved the Royals up to 16th place in the league table on 22 points six points behind Bolton Wanderers in the final play-off position on 28 points (6th place) and 10 points behind league leaders Cardiff City on 32 points. Andy Rinomhota made his second Royals debut and Sean Patton made his league debut for Reading in this match.

=== December ===
On 1 December, Reading confirmed that Miles Obodo had joined Chichester City on loan until January.

On 8 December, Reading announced that their postponed trip to Leam Richardson's former club Wigan Athletic, originally scheduled for 15 November but postponed due to international call-ups had been rearranged for 19:45hrs on 10 February 2026.

On 9 December, Reading hosted Peterborough United at Madejski Stadium seeking back-to-back victories for the first time this season. The Posh beat Reading 2–1 to put an end to Reading's unbeaten home run and the Royals their first home defeat under Leam Richardson. The result left Reading in 17th place and three points ahead of 21st-placed Peterborough United in the first relegation spot and 9 points behind 6th-placed Bolton Wanderers in the final play-off spot. Many Royals journalists and pundits thought that this was the club's worst performance under the management of Leam Richardson with the Reading Chronicle reporter Ramy Abou-Setta labelling the match "sloppy, inaccurate and leaving much to be desired" with Reading captain Lewis Wing the best player in the defeat with the match delivering a "reality check" to their promotion hopes with Lewis Wing being his highest rated player and Andre Garcia being his lowest-rated player with his reason for giving Lewis Wing a 7/10 was: “The skipper though to many didn't look the best, was the most accurate passer across both teams. All his crosses were accurate, he made two key passes and created one big chance" and his reason for giving Andre Garcia the lowest rating of 4/10 was: “Similar to [Andy] Yiadom, but left too much to be desired. Reflecting on his first league defeat in charge of the Royals manager Leam Richardson said: “He was very disappointed. First and foremost, I think that you’ve got to be gracious. We win together, we lose together. Congratulations to Peterborough [United], but my initial thoughts and reaction is very, very disappointed, to say the least, with how we started the game. I think that we lost the game in the first five minutes, in my opinion". During the match Reading were again denied two blatant penalties like their previous home match to Rotherham United with the first call being after Kelvin Abrefa found himself in space on the wing and drove into the Peterborough box to put a cross in to the awaiting forwards but it was blocked by the hand of a Peterborough defender to the bemusement of Reading fans, the referee waived it off and declared it a corner kick and the second call was after Charlie Savage whipped in a cross into the box and it was only cleared to Kamari Doyle who was brought down after wrestling for the ball with calls for penalty kick being again waived off. Reading manager Leam Richardson said about this: “I think that we had a call straight after as well. We had Kamari Doyle, and we’ve had a couple of them now [Rotherham] but for some reason, we haven't been giving them. Matt Ritchie’s now getting his legs stitched with the challenge [Harley Mills tackle], which I thought was a reckless challenge and should have been a red card. But for some reason, he didn't give it. We’re not looking for excuses. We had 90-plus minutes to put our stamp on the game tonight, to go and try and win the game and dominate in certain areas. We didn't dominate because we kept giving possession up in poor areas, doing the wrong thing for the right reasons".

On 10 December, it was announced by the EFL that Reading manager Leam Richardson had been nominated for the Sky Bet League One Manager of the Month award for November after winning seven points from his first three league matches in charge which included their first away victory. However, the award was later given to Conor Hourihane (Barnsley).

On 11 December, it was announced that Andy Rinomhota had been called-up to the Zimbabwe national football team squad for the 2025 Africa Cup of Nations (AFCON 2025) in Morocco and therefore would miss Royals matches from the 21 December 2025 to 18 January 2026.

On 12 December, it was announced that Charlie Savage had been nominated for the Sky Bet League One Goal of the Month award for November 2025 for his long-range strike against Rotherham United on 22 November 2025 with him up against Tyreeq Bakinson for Leyton Orient against Exeter City, Leo Castledine for Huddersfield Town against Luton Town and Azeem Abdulai also for Leyton Orient against Burton Albion.

On 16 December, Reading announced that Jacob Borgnis had extended his loan deal at Slough Town for another month, and that Basil Tuma had also joined Slough Town on loan until 10 January 2026.

On 17 December, Reading's away trip to Northampton Town on 31 January, was brought forward from an 15:00hr kick-off, to a 14:00hr kick-off at the request of Northampton Town due to Northampton Saints hosting Leicester Tigers in the Premiership Rugby Cup later the same day.

On 18 December, it was announced that former CEO (chief executive officer) Nigel Howe had served the club with a Winding Up Petition to try to get some extra funds from Rob Couhig’s takeover of Reading FC with the club confirming in a statement saying "that it’s in a sale dispute with Mr Nigel Howe. The club denies any claims made against it. Given the ongoing dispute and potential legal proceedings, the club will not be making any further comment at this time".

On 18 December, Reading hosted newly-relegated Luton Town at the Madejski Stadium as part of their Christmas themed matchday. The match saw Finely Burns made his first appearance under Leam Richardson and striker Jack Marriott make his return to the starting XI from injury in which Reading won 3–2.This result sealed a massive win to put Reading into 15th place on 25 points from 20 matches eight points behind sixth-placed Bolton Wanderers (34 points) in the final play-off position and sixteen points behind league leaders Cardiff City (41 points).

On 20 December, Reading announced that Carter Bowdery had joined Hungerford Town on loan until 17 January 2026.

On 23 December, it was announced by the Reading Chronicle reporter Ramy Abou-Setta that Matty Jacob would return to his parent club Hull City on 1 January 2026 with them cutting his loan spell short due to him sustaining a major injury. Matty Jacob played 16 games for the Royals with Tigers manager Sergej Jakirović saying: "The plan is that he [Matty Jacob] will stay with us from January [1 2026]".

On 26 December, Southern League Premier Division South club Basingstoke Town announced the loan signing of Joseph Barough.

On 29 December, in the Royals' final match of 2025 Reading drew 1-1 away to Peterborough United.

=== January ===
On 1 January, Reading chairman and co-owner Rob Couhig released a New Year's message to Royals supporters which read: "Dear Royals, as welcome in the New Year, I wanted to write to you directly, not only to reflect on where we are as a club, but also to speak plainly and honestly with you, as you deserve. First and foremost, thank you. Your support over the past year has been extraordinary. Through uncertainty, frustration and fatigue born from recent seasons, you have continued to turn up, back the team and stand by Reading Football Club. I know how much this club means to you and I do not take that loyalty lightly. That backing has mattered, it has been felt and it has helped carry us into a far stronger position as we enter the second half of the season. Over the past few days, some of you may have seen reports suggesting that the club is considering selling its training ground or downgrading the Academy. I want to be absolutely clear with you: those claim are categorically untrue ... With the January transfer window now open, much of the groundwork has already been underway behind the scenes, and we will continue to support Leam [Richardson] and his staff in strengthening the group where possible, always within a responsible framework that serves the club's long-term interests..."

On 2 January, Reading confirmed that Matty Jacob had returned to his parent club Hull City after his loan was ended.

On 4 January, Reading got their first back-to-back clean sheets of the season with a 1-0 win over 6th-placed Stockport County at the Madejski Stadium in the knowledge that this would be Leam Richardson’s hardest test since taking charge of the team. This victory moved the Royals up into 9th place and 4 points behind Stockport County in the final play-off position.

On 7 January, Reading announced that Randell Williams had extended his contract until the end of the following campaign (30 June 2027), after initially signing a short-term contract until 31 January 2026 on 5 November 2025.

On 12 January, Reading announced that Tom Norcott had joined Farnborough on loan until 13 February.

On 13 January, Reading announced that Jacob Borgnis and Basil Tuma had both extended their loan deals with Slough Town, Jacob Borgnis extending until the end of the season and Basil Tuma until mid-March.

On 14 January, Reading announced the signing of Will Keane, brother of Everton defender Michael Keane, on loan from EFL Championship club Preston North End until the end of the season. He previously played under current Reading manager Leam Richardson with Wigan Athletic between 2020 and 2023 and scored 43 goals in 97 games. He was the 2021–22 EFL League One top goalscorer with 26 goals winning the EFL League One title.

On 15 January, Reading announced that Shay Spencer had joined National League club Wealdstone on loan for at least the next month. The following day, 16 January, Boyd Beacroft joined Farnborough on loan for one month.

On 17 January, Reading travelled to Brisbane Road to face London rivals Leyton Orient. Reading lost 3–1 with former Royal Dom Ballard scoring a hat-trick, leaving Reading 4 points off the final play-off position.

On 19 January, it was reported by Ramy Abou-Setta in the Reading Chronicle that EFL Championship club and local rivals Oxford United would submit another bid for Royals midfielder Charlie Savage – son of former Manchester United and Wales midfielder Robbie Savage – after seeing their initial bid of £500,000 rejected by Reading on 15 January 2026.

On 21 January, Reading announced the signing of Ryan Nyambe on loan from EFL Championship club Derby County until the end of the season. He previously played 33 times under current Royals manager Leam Richardson at Wigan Athletic between 2022 and 2023. Later on the same day, Reading announced the signing of Haydon Roberts from another EFL Championship club in Bristol City on a contract until 30 June 2028 for an undisclosed fee.

On 23 January, Under 21s squad player Jay Williams joined Dorchester Town on a one-month loan deal.

On 25 January, Reading hosted Barnsley at the Madejski Stadium seeking to return to winning ways as part of "Louisiana Day" themed matchday with co-owners Rob Couhig and Todd Trosclair in attendance for the match. Haydon Roberts made his first start for the Royals and Ryan Nyambe made his first Reading appearance off the bench. Reading drew 2–2 with new signing Haydon Roberts opening the scoring for the hosts.

On 26 January, Reading announced that their postponed trip to Mansfield Town, due to Mansfield's progression in the FA Cup, had been rearranged for 19:45hrs on 10 March 2026. Later on the same day, Reading announced the signing of Benn Ward from EFL League Two club and Royals manager Leam Richardson’s former club Accrington Stanley to a three-and-a-half-year deal for an undisclosed fee.

On 27 January, new signings Ryan Nyambe and Will Keane made their first league starts for the Royals with a 1–0 win over Stockport County.

On 29 January, Reading announced the signing of Scofield Lonmeni-Dekam from Liverpool's academy for an undisclosed fee, with Lonmeni-Dekam signing his first professional contract.

On 30 January, Reading announced that Sean Patton had joined National League club Aldershot Town on loan for the remainder of the season.

On 31 January, Reading travelled to the Sixfields Stadium to face Northampton Town seeking their first away victory since the Boxing Day 4–1 win over Plymouth Argyle. Prior to the match it was announced that Daniel Kyerewaa had sustained a nasty injury in Reading's previous match at home to Exeter City and would likely be out for a long period of time. Reading won 2–0 moving them up to 10th place, 8 points off 6th-placed Huddersfield Town with two games in hand. This gave the Royals a league double over Northampton Town for the first time since the 1974–75 season with their 1–0 home win and this 2–0 away victory.

=== February ===
On 1 February, Reading announced that Andre Garcia had left the club to join Club NXT, the academy team of Belgian Pro League side Club Brugge, for an undisclosed fee.

On Transfer Deadline Day, 2 February, Reading announced the signing of Kadan Young on loan from Premier League club Aston Villa for the remainder of the season as a replacement for the injured Daniel Kyerewaa. Also on the same day earlier in the day, Reading announced that goalkeeper Matthew Rowley had been recalled from his loan with National League South club Hampton & Richmond Borough.

On 4 February, reports then emerged that Blackburn Rovers were also looking at appointing former Manchester United player, Wales national football team player and current National League club Forest Green Rovers manager Robbie Savage who is also the father of current Royals midfielder Charlie Savage.

On 6 February, Ashqar Ahmed joined National League club Forest Green Rovers on loan for the remainder of the season where he would link-up with fellow Royal Abraham Kanu and former Manchester United and Wales national football team player and father of Royals midfielder Charlie Savage, Robbie Savage.

On 7 February, Reading travelled to London to The Cherry Red Records Stadium to face AFC Wimbledon seeking revenge for their 2–1 home defeat in August 2025 in a must-win match to stay within touching distance of the play-off positions. Reading narrowly lost 3–2 dropping down to 11th place.

On 24 February, Matthew Rowley joined National League South club Tonbridge Angels on loan for the remainder of the season.

On 28 February, Sean Patton was recalled from his loan deal with Aldershot Town by Reading.

=== March ===
On 6 March, Reading announced that John Clarke had joined Slough Town on a one-month loan deal.

On 17 March, Shay Spencer had his loan deal with Wealdstone extended until the end of the season.

On 24 March, Harrison Rhone and Reece Evans joined Brackley Town and Torquay United, respectively, on loan for the remainder of the season.

=== April ===
On 24 April, John Clarke announced via his X account, that he would be leaving Reading at the end of his contract in the summer.

=== May ===
On 5 May, Reading released their retained and released list, with Mamadi Camará, Ben Elliott, Michael Stickland, Tivonge Rushesha and Andy Yiadom all leaving the club at the end of their contracts on 30 June. Reading confirmed that they had activated one-year extension clauses with Jeriel Dorsett, whilst new contracts had been offered to Kelvin Abrefa and Andy Rinomhota.

On 11 May, Reading announced that they had entered into a two-year footballing partnership with American youth football team Louisiana Fire SC. Also on 11 May, Reading released their retained and released list for their Under-21s. Jacob Borgnis, John Clarke, Miles Obodo, Jeremiah Okine-Peters, Basil Tuma and Jay Williams would all be released at the end of their contracts, whilst Carter Bowdery, Philip Duah, Sam Harrison, David Hicks, Luke Howard, Abraham Kanu, Harrison Rhone, John Ryan, Shay Spencer all had one-year extensions to their contracts activated, and Boyd Beacroft, Tom Norcott, Emmanuel Osho, Matt Rowley, Tyler Sackey and Joe Barough were all in talks regarding new contracts with the club.

On 12 May, Reading announced their retained and released list for their U18s, with Jacob Neptune and Ainsley Covus having one-year contract options activated, whilst Dennis Bossman, George Booth, Anthony Dove, Harley Irish and T’Shay St Louis had all been offered contracts to extend their stay with the club.

On 19 May, Reading announced that Harrison Rhone had signed a new contract with the club, until the summer of 2028.

=== June ===
On 8 June, Matt Ritchie announced his retirement from football.

On 14 June, Reading announced that they had extended their contract with Andy Rinomhota for another season, keeping him at the club until the summer of 2027.

On 22 June, Derrick Williams announced his retirement from football.

On 24 June, Reading announced that they had extended their contract with Kelvin Abrefa until the summer of 2028.

On 30 June, Reading announced that they had signed new one-year contracts with Matthew Rowley and Boyd Beacroft, a two-year contract with Tom Norcott and Emmanuel Osho, a three-year contract with Tyler Sackey and six-month contracts with Joe Barough and Dennis Bossman whilst they rehab from injury.

== Squad ==
As of match played 2 May 2026

| No. | Name | Nationality | Position | Date of birth (age) | Signed from | Signed in | Contract ends | Apps. | Goals |
Goalkeepers
| 1 | Joel Pereira (Note: Joel Pereira was born in Switzerland, but qualified to represent Portugal, representing them at youth level between 2012 and 2018.) | (Portugal) | GK | 28 June 1996 (aged 29) | Unattached | 2023 | 2028 | 97 | 0 |
| 25 | Jack Stevens | (England) | GK | 2 August 1997 (aged 28) | Cambridge United | 2025 | 2027 | 10 | 0 |
| 31 | Tom Norcott | (England) | GK | 3 January 2005 (aged 21) | Academy | 2021 | 2028 | 2 | 0 |
Defenders
| 2 | Kelvin Abrefa (Note: Kelvin Abrefa was born in Italy to Ghanaian parents, going on to make his debut for Ghana U20 in June 2022.) | (Ghana) | DF | 9 December 2003 (aged 22) | Academy | 2020 | 2028 | 83 | 2 |
| 3 | Jeriel Dorsett (Note: Jeriel Dorsett was born in Enfield, England, but qualified to represent Montserrat and made his international debut for Montserrat in September 2023. He previously represented England at U18 level.) | (Montserrat) | DF | 4 May 2002 (aged 23) | Academy | 2018 | 2027 | 87 | 3 |
| 5 | Haydon Roberts | (England) | DF | 10 May 2002 (aged 23) | Bristol City | 2026 | 2028 | 14 | 1 |
| 12 | Finley Burns | (England) | DF | 17 June 2003 (aged 22) | on loan from Manchester City | 2025 | 2026 | 33 | 0 |
| 15 | Paudie O'Connor | (Republic of Ireland) | DF | 14 July 1997 (aged 28) | Lincoln City | 2025 | 2029 | 36 | 3 |
| 16 | Benn Ward | (England) | DF | 20 January 2004 (aged 22) | Accrington Stanley | 2026 | 2029 | 8 | 0 |
| 17 | Andy Yiadom (Note: Andy Yiadom was born in Holloway, England, but qualified to represent Ghana and made his international debut for Ghana in January 2017. He previously represented England at C level.) | (Ghana) | DF | 2 December 1991 (aged 34) | Barnsley | 2018 | 2026 | 253 | 4 |
| 22 | Michael Stickland | (England) | DF | 9 November 2003 (aged 22) | Academy | 2020 | 2026 | 21 | 0 |
| 23 | John Clarke | (Republic of Ireland) | DF | 24 April 2004 (aged 22) | Port Vale | 2022 | 2026 | 4 | 0 |
| 24 | Ryan Nyambe | (Namibia) | DF | 4 December 1997 (aged 28) | on loan from Derby County | 2026 | 2026 | 19 | 0 |
| 33 | Derrick Williams (Note: Derrick Williams was born in Hamburg, Germany, but qualified to represent Republic of Ireland and made his international debut for Republic of Ireland in January 2018) | (Republic of Ireland) | DF | 17 January 1993 (aged 33) | Atlanta United | 2025 | 2027 | 24 | 0 |
| 36 | John Ryan | (Republic of Ireland) | DF | 21 January 2004 (aged 22) | Sassuolo | 2023 | 2027 | 6 | 0 |
| 39 | Ashqar Ahmed | (England) | DF | 31 August 2007 (aged 18) | Academy | 2023 | 2027 | 24 | 0 |
| | Abraham Kanu | (Sierra Leone) | DF | 3 July 2005 (aged 20) | Academy | 2021 | 2027 | 16 | 0 |
Midfielders
| 4 | Ben Elliott (Note: Ben Elliott was born in Kingston upon Thames, England, but qualified to represent Cameroon and made his international debut for Cameroon in June 2023. He previously represented England at U15 & U16 level.) | (Cameroon) | MF | 5 November 2002 (aged 23) | Chelsea | 2023 | 2026 | 79 | 3 |
| 6 | Liam Fraser | (Canada) | MF | 13 February 1998 (aged 28) | Unattached | 2025 | 2027 | 37 | 2 |
| 8 | Charlie Savage (Note: Charlie Savage was born in Leicester, England, but qualified to represent Wales, representing them at U17, U18, U19, U21 and senior level.) | (Wales) | MF | 2 May 2003 (aged 23) | Manchester United | 2023 | 2027 | 142 | 14 |
| 10 | Lewis Wing | (England) | MF | 23 June 1995 (aged 30) | Unattached | 2023 | 2028 | 147 | 34 |
| 11 | Daniel Kyerewaa | (Germany) | MF | 5 October 2001 (aged 24) | Unattached | 2025 | 2027 | 38 | 5 |
| 14 | Tivonge Rushesha | (Zimbabwe) | MF | 24 July 2002 (aged 23) | Unattached | 2023 | 2026 | 38 | 0 |
| 18 | Andy Rinomhota (Note: Andy Rinomhota was born in Leeds, England, but qualified to represent Zimbabwe making his senior debut in 2023.) | (Zimbabwe) | MF | 21 April 1997 (aged 29) | Unattached | 2025 | 2027 | 142 | 4 |
| 19 | Kadan Young | (England) | MF | 19 January 2006 (aged 20) | on loan from Aston Villa | 2026 | 2026 | 7 | 0 |
| 21 | Randell Williams | (England) | MF | 30 December 1996 (aged 29) | Unattached | 2025 | 2027 | 15 | 2 |
| 28 | Mamadi Camará | (Guinea-Bissau) | MF | 31 December 2003 (aged 22) | Feirense | 2020 | 2026 | 75 | 7 |
| 29 | Kamari Doyle | (England) | MF | 1 August 2005 (aged 20) | on loan from Brighton & Hove Albion | 2025 | 2026 | 46 | 4 |
| 30 | Matt Ritchie (Note: Matt Ritchie was born in Gosport, England, but qualified to represent Scotland making his senior debut in 2015.) | (Scotland) | MF | 10 September 1989 (aged 36) | Unattached | 2025 | 2027 | 29 | 1 |
| 32 | Paddy Lane (Note: Paddy Lane was born in England, but qualified to represent Northern Ireland making his senior debut in 2022.) | (Northern Ireland) | MF | 18 February 2001 (aged 25) | Portsmouth | 2025 | 2028 | 38 | 2 |
| 44 | Tyler Sackey | (England) | MF | 14 November 2006 (aged 19) | Academy | 2024 | 2029 | 7 | 2 |
| 49 | Emmanuel Osho | (England) | MF | 26 September 2006 (aged 19) | Academy | 2024 | 2028 | 8 | 0 |
Forwards
| 7 | Jack Marriott | (England) | FW | 9 September 1994 (aged 31) | Wrexham | 2025 | 2028 | 25 | 17 |
| 9 | Kelvin Ehibhatiomhan | (Nigeria) | FW | 23 April 2003 (aged 22) | Academy | 2021 | 2027 | 139 | 27 |
| 20 | Mark O'Mahony | (Republic of Ireland) | FW | 14 January 2005 (aged 21) | on loan from Brighton & Hove Albion | 2025 | 2026 | 21 | 2 |
| 26 | Basil Tuma (Note: Basil Tuma was born in Uganda, but qualified to represent Malta, and made his international debut for Malta U20 in November 2022.) | (Malta) | FW | 24 April 2005 (aged 21) | Academy | 2021 | 2026 | 15 | 0 |
| 27 | Will Keane (Note: Will Keane was born in Stockport, England, but qualified to represent Republic of Ireland and made his international debut for Republic of Ireland in November 2021. He previously represented England at various Youth levels.) | (Republic of Ireland) | FW | 11 January 1993 (aged 33) | on loan from Preston North End | 2026 | 2026 | 14 | 2 |
| 43 | Jeremiah Okine-Peters | (England) | FW | 16 December 2004 (aged 21) | Academy | 2021 | 2026 | 5 | 1 |
| 57 | Sean Patton | (Republic of Ireland) | FW | 25 July 2006 (aged 19) | Derry City | 2025 | 2027 | 8 | 1 |
U21
| 34 | Joseph Barough | (England) | MF | 3 April 2006 (aged 20) | Academy | 2023 | 2026 | 2 | 0 |
| 35 | Carter Bowdery | (England) | MF | 11 December 2006 (aged 19) | Academy | 2025 | 2027 | 0 | 0 |
| 37 | Luke Howard | (England) | MF | 29 September 2007 (aged 18) | Academy | 2025 | 2027 | 1 | 0 |
| 38 | Philip Duah | (Ghana) | DF | 13 November 2006 (aged 19) | Academy | 2024 | 2027 | 2 | 0 |
| 40 | Sam Harrison | (England) | DF | 24 October 2006 (aged 19) | | 2024 | 2027 | 0 | 0 |
| 41 | Harrison Rhone | (England) | GK | 25 March 2006 (aged 20) | Academy | 2021 | 2028 | 0 | 0 |
| 42 | Boyd Beacroft | (England) | DF | 22 November 2005 (aged 20) | Academy | 2021 | 2027 | 2 | 0 |
| 45 | Kiyan Coke-Miles-Smith | (England) | MF | 22 November 2005 (aged 20) | Academy | 2024 | 2027 | 0 | 0 |
| 46 | Jacob Borgnis | (New Zealand) | MF | 6 September 2004 (aged 21) | Academy | 2021 | 2026 | 3 | 1 |
| 47 | Shay Spencer | (England) | MF | 13 October 2005 (age 21) | Academy | 2022 | 2027 | 9 | 0 |
| 48 | Matthew Rowley | (England) | GK | 30 July 2004 (aged 21) | Academy | 2020 | 2027 | 0 | 0 |
| 50 | Jerae Jones | (England) | MF | 22 May 2007 (aged 18) | Academy | 2024 | 2027 | 0 | 0 |
| 51 | Josh Welland | (England) | GK | 30 December 2006 (aged 19) | Academy | 2025 | 2027 | 0 | 0 |
| 52 | Dennis Bossman | (England) | FW | 7 October 2006 (aged 19) | Academy | 2023 | 2026 | 0 | 0 |
| 55 | Reece Evans (Note: Reece Evans was born in Northern Ireland, but qualified to represent Zimbabwe, making his senior debut for their U23's in November 2026.) | (Northern Ireland) | FW | 25 September 2005 (aged 20) | Unattached | 2025 | 2027 | 1 | 0 |
| | Jay Williams | (England) | DF | 26 January 2007 (aged 19) | Unattached | 2025 | 2026 | 0 | 0 |
| | David Hicks | (England) | MF | 2 May 2006 (aged 20) | Unattached | 2025 | 2027 | 0 | 0 |
| | Scofield Lonmeni-Dekam | (England) | MF | 27 January 2008 (aged 18) | Liverpool | 2026 | | 0 | 0 |
| | Miles Obodo | (England) | FW | 31 October 2006 (aged 19) | Unattached | 2025 | 2026 | 0 | 0 |
U18
| | Toby Borgnis | (New Zealand) | GK | 30 September 2008 (aged 17) | Academy | 2025 | | 0 | 0 |
| | Jacob Neptune | (England) | DF | | Academy | 2026 | | 0 | 0 |
| | Ainsley Covus | (England) | MF | | Academy | 2026 | | 0 | 0 |
Left during the season
| 5 | Matty Jacob | (England) | DF | 3 June 2001 (aged 24) | on loan from Hull City | 2025 | 2026 | 16 | 0 |
| 7 | Harvey Knibbs | (England) | FW | 26 April 1999 (aged 27) | Unattached | 2023 | 2026 | 100 | 32 |
| 19 | Andre Garcia | (England) | MF | 30 November 2007 (aged 18) | Academy | 2024 | | 56 | 2 |

== Transfers ==
For those players sold, released or contract ended before the start of this season, see 2024–25 Reading F.C. season.

=== In ===
| Date | Position | Nationality | Name | From | Fee | Ref. |
|---|---|---|---|---|---|---|
| 17 June 2025 (Note: Transfer announced on the shown date, becoming official on 1 July 2025.) | DF | (Republic of Ireland) | Paudie O'Connor | Lincoln City | Free | |
| 25 June 2025 | GK | (England) | Jack Stevens | Cambridge United | Free | |
| 22 July 2025 | MF | (Germany) | Daniel Kyerewaa | Unattached | Free | |
| 23 July 2025 | MF | (Canada) | Liam Fraser | Unattached | Free | |
| 31 July 2025 | MF | (Northern Ireland) | Paddy Lane | Portsmouth | Undisclosed | |
| 4 August 2025 | MF | (England) | David Hicks | Unattached | Free | |
| 4 August 2025 | FW | (Northern Ireland) | Reece Evans | Unattached | Free | |
| 4 August 2025 | FW | (England) | Miles Obodo | Unattached | Free | |
| 14 August 2025 | DF | (England) | Jay Williams | Unattached | Free | |
| 15 August 2025 | DF | (Republic of Ireland) | Derrick Williams | Atlanta United | Free | |
| 26 August 2025 | FW | (England) | Jack Marriott | Wrexham | Undisclosed | |
| 28 August 2025 | MF | (Scotland) | Matt Ritchie | Unattached | Free | |
| 1 September 2025 | FW | (Republic of Ireland) | Sean Patton | Derry City | Undisclosed | |
| 5 November 2025 | MF | (England) | Randell Williams | Unattached | Free | |
| 12 November 2025 | MF | (Zimbabwe) | Andy Rinomhota | Unattached | Free | |
| 21 January 2026 | DF | (England) | Haydon Roberts | Bristol City | Undisclosed | |
| 26 January 2026 | DF | (England) | Benn Ward | Accrington Stanley | £400,000 | |
| 29 January 2026 | MF | (England) | Scofield Lonmeni-Dekam | Liverpool | Undisclosed | |

=== Loans in ===
| Start date | Position | Nationality | Name | From | End date | Ref. |
|---|---|---|---|---|---|---|
| 4 July 2025 | DF | (England) | Matty Jacob | Hull City | 2 January 2026 | |
| 7 July 2025 | DF | (England) | Finley Burns | Manchester City | 30 June 2026 | |
| 7 July 2025 | FW | (Republic of Ireland) | Mark O'Mahony | Brighton & Hove Albion | 30 June 2026 | |
| 4 August 2025 | MF | (England) | Kamari Doyle | Brighton & Hove Albion | 30 June 2026 | |
| 14 January 2026 | FW | (Republic of Ireland) | Will Keane | Preston North End | 30 June 2026 | |
| 21 January 2026 | DF | (Namibia) | Ryan Nyambe | Derby County | 30 June 2026 | |
| 2 February 2026 | MF | (England) | Kadan Young | Aston Villa | 30 June 2026 | |

=== Out ===
| Date | Position | Nationality | Name | To | Fee | Ref. |
|---|---|---|---|---|---|---|
| 1 August 2025 | MF | (England) | Harvey Knibbs | Charlton Athletic | Undisclosed (Note: Transfer fee believed to be £1,800,000) | |
| 1 February 2026 | MF | (England) | Andre Garcia | Club Brugge | Undisclosed | |

=== Loans out ===
| Start date | Position | Nationality | Name | To | End date | Ref. |
|---|---|---|---|---|---|---|
| 24 July 2025 | DF | (Sierra Leone) | Abraham Kanu | Forest Green Rovers | 30 June 2026 | |
| 2 August 2025 | GK | (England) | Josh Welland | Beaconsfield Town | Undisclosed | |
| 8 August 2025 | GK | (England) | Tom Norcott | Woking | 15 October 2025 (Note: On 19 September, Norcott's loan at Woking was extended until mid-November, before being recalled on 15 October) | |
| 8 November 2025 | GK | (England) | Matthew Rowley | Hampton & Richmond Borough | 3 January 2026 | |
| 11 November 2025 | GK | (England) | Tom Norcott | Enfield Town | 12 January 2026 | |
| 14 November 2025 | MF | (New Zealand) | Jacob Borgnis | Slough Town | 30 June 2026 | |
| 29 November 2025 | FW | (England) | Miles Obodo | Chichester City | 1 January 2026 | |
| 16 December 2025 | FW | (Malta) | Basil Tuma | Slough Town | 30 June 2026 | |
| 20 December 2025 | MF | (England) | Carter Bowdery | Hungerford Town | 17 January 2026 | |
| 26 December 2025 | MF | (England) | Joseph Barough | Basingstoke Town | 31 January 2026 | |
| 12 January 2026 | GK | (England) | Tom Norcott | Farnborough | 12 February 2026 | |
| 15 January 2026 | MF | (England) | Shay Spencer | Wealdstone | 30 June 2026 | |
| 16 January 2026 | DF | (England) | Boyd Beacroft | Farnborough | 16 February 2026 | |
| 23 January 2026 | DF | (England) | Jay Williams | Dorchester Town | 23 February 2026 | |
| 30 January 2026 | FW | (Republic of Ireland) | Sean Patton | Aldershot Town | 28 February 2026 | |
| 6 February 2026 | DF | (England) | Ashqar Ahmed | Forest Green Rovers | 30 June 2026 | |
| 21 February 2026 | DF | (England) | Michael Stickland | Farnborough | 21 March 2026 | |
| 24 February 2026 | GK | (England) | Matthew Rowley | Tonbridge Angels | 30 June 2026 | |
| 6 March 2026 | DF | (Republic of Ireland) | John Clarke | Slough Town | 30 June 2026 | |
| 24 March 2026 | GK | (England) | Harrison Rhone | Brackley Town | 30 June 2026 | |
| 27 March 2026 | FW | (Northern Ireland) | Reece Evans | Torquay United | 30 June 2026 | |

=== Released ===
| Date | Position | Nationality | Name | Joined | Date | Ref |
|---|---|---|---|---|---|---|
| 8 June 2026 | MF | (Scotland) | Matt Ritchie | Retirement | | |
| 22 June 2026 | DF | (Republic of Ireland) | Derrick Williams | Retirement | | |
| 30 June 2026 | DF | (England) | Michael Stickland | Aldershot Town | 1 July 2026 | |
| 30 June 2026 | DF | (England) | Jay Williams | Gosport Borough | 1 July 2026 | |
| 30 June 2026 | DF | (Ghana) | Andy Yiadom | AFC Wimbledon | 17 August 2026 | |
| 30 June 2026 | DF | (Republic of Ireland) | John Clarke | Bury | 28 July 2026 | |
| 30 June 2026 | MF | (Cameroon) | Ben Elliott | | | |
| 30 June 2026 | MF | (Guinea-Bissau) | Mamadi Camará | Kayserispor | 13 July 2026 | |
| 30 June 2026 | MF | (New Zealand) | Jacob Borgnis | Aldershot Town | 1 July 2026 | |
| 30 June 2026 | MF | (Sweden) | Jubilee Ntege | Nottingham Forest | 17 September 2026 | |
| 30 June 2026 | MF | (Zimbabwe) | Tivonge Rushesha | Radnik Bijeljina | 10 July 2026 | |
| 30 June 2026 | FW | (England) | Miles Obodo | Farnham Town | 1 July 2026 | |
| 30 June 2026 | FW | (England) | Jeremiah Okine-Peters | Basingstoke Town | 1 July 2026 | |
| 30 June 2026 | FW | (Malta) | Basil Tuma | Aldershot Town | 1 July 2026 | |
| 30 June 2026 | FW | (Sweden) | Joseph Ntege | Nottingham Forest | 17 September 2026 | |

=== Trial ===
| Date from | Position | Nationality | Name | Last club | Date to | Ref. |
|---|---|---|---|---|---|---|
| July 2025 | DF | (England) | Yeboah Amankwah | Lommel | July 2025 | |
| July 2025 | MF | (Wales) | Joe Morrell | Portsmouth | July 2025 | |
| August 2025 | DF | (England) | Harry Chard | Swindon Town | | |
| August 2025 | DF | (England) | Nathan Ferguson | Crystal Palace | | |
| October 2025 | MF | (England) | Randell Williams | Leyton Orient | 5 November 2025 | |
| October 2025 | MF | (Zimbabwe) | Andy Rinomhota | Cardiff City | 12 November 2025 | |

== Friendlies ==
On 29 May, Reading announced their first pre-season friendly, an away trip to face Gillingham on 12 July. Reading announced their second pre-season friendly on 3 June, a home match against Portsmouth on 26 July. On 9 June, Reading announced two behind-closed doors friendlies at Bearwood Park Training Ground, against Swindon Town on 15 July and Oxford United on 22 July. On 27 June, Reading announced that their first pre-season friendly would take place on 5 July, away to Hungerford Town at Bulpit Lane, and that they would host Tottenham Hotspur at home on 19 July.

| 5 July 2025 | Hungerford Town | 1–5 | Reading | Hungerford |
| 15:00 BST (UTC+1) | Williams 39' | Report | Tuma 26'; Osho 28', 36'; Ahmed 56'; Okine-Peters 71' | Stadium: Bulpit Lane; Attendance: 1,500 |

| 12 July 2025 | Gillingham | 0–0 | Reading | Gillingham |
| 15:00 BST (UTC+1) | | Report | | Stadium: Priestfield Stadium; Attendance: 1,930 |

| 15 July 2025 | Reading | 2–1 | Swindon Town | Sindlesham |
| 12:00 BST (UTC+1) | Trialist; Ehibhatiomhan | Report | Goal | Stadium: Bearwood Park Training Ground; Attendance: 0 |
Note: Match consisted of two 60minute halves, and was played behind closed doors.

| 19 July 2025 | Reading | 0–2 | Tottenham Hotspur | Reading |
| 15:00 BST (UTC+1) | O'Mahony (yellow card) 32' | Report | Lankshear 49'; Vušković 53' | Stadium: Madejski Stadium; Attendance: 22,133; Referee: Farai Hallam |

| 22 July 2025 | Reading | 1–1 | Slough Town | Sindlesham |
| 12:00 BST (UTC+1) | Borgnis | Report | Goal | Stadium: Bearwood Park Training Ground; Attendance: 0 |
Note: Fixture was originally scheduled to be against Oxford United, but was changed due to there need to prioritise an evening fixture. Match played behind closed doors.

| 26 July 2025 | Reading | 0–4 | Portsmouth | Reading |
| 15:00 BST (UTC+1) | | Report | Williams 4'; Lang 23'; Bishop 45+2', 55' | Stadium: Madejski Stadium; Attendance: 3,954; Referee: Gavin Ward |

=== Development ===
On 5 May, Basingstoke Town announced that they would host a Reading XI in a pre-season friendly on 26 July. On 5 June, Reading announced four pre-season fixtures for their academy teams.

| 19 July 2025 | Beaconsfield Town | – | Reading U18s | Beaconsfield |
| 15:00 BST (UTC+1) | | | | Stadium: Holloways Park |

| 26 July 2025 | Basingstoke Town | 1–1 | Reading U21s | Basingstoke |
| 11:00 BST (UTC+1) | Clark 67' | Report | Osho 64' | Stadium: Winklebury Sports Complex; Attendance: 750 |

| 26 July 2025 | Thatcham Town | Cancelled | Reading U18s | Thatcham |
| 13:00 BST (UTC+1) | | | | Stadium: Waterside Park |

| 30 July 2025 | Bracknell Town | 2–2 | Reading U18s | Sandhurst |
| 19:00 BST (UTC+1) | 18'; 72' | Report | Coddington; Pavey (pen.) | Stadium: Bottom Meadow |

== Competitions ==
=== Overall record ===
| Competition | First match | Last match | Starting round | Final position | Record | | | | | | | |
| Competition | First match | Last match | Starting round | Final position | Pld | W | D | L | GF | GA | GD | Win % |
|---|---|---|---|---|---|---|---|---|---|---|---|---|
| League One | 2 August 2025 | 2 May 2026 | Matchday 1 | 12th | 46 | 16 | 15 | 15 | 64 | 60 | +4 | 34.78 |
| FA Cup | 1 November 2025 | 1 November 2025 | First round | First round | 1 | 0 | 0 | 1 | 2 | 3 | −1 | 0.00 |
| EFL Cup | 12 August 2025 | 23 September 2025 | First round | Third round | 3 | 2 | 0 | 1 | 4 | 4 | +0 | 66.67 |
| EFL Trophy | 2 September 2025 | 7 October 2025 | Group stage | Group stage | 3 | 2 | 0 | 1 | 6 | 4 | +2 | 66.67 |
| Total | | | | | 53 | 20 | 15 | 18 | 76 | 71 | +5 | 37.74 |

Last updated: 2 May 2026
Source: Soccerway

=== League One ===
==== League table ====
| Pos | Team | Pld | W | D | L | GF | GA | GD | Pts |
|---|---|---|---|---|---|---|---|---|---|
| 10 | Mansfield Town | 46 | 16 | 17 | 13 | 62 | 50 | +12 | 65 |
| 11 | Wycombe Wanderers | 46 | 17 | 12 | 17 | 69 | 58 | +11 | 63 |
| 12 | Reading | 46 | 16 | 15 | 15 | 64 | 60 | +4 | 63 |
| 13 | Blackpool | 46 | 17 | 9 | 20 | 54 | 65 | −11 | 60 |
| 14 | Doncaster Rovers | 46 | 17 | 9 | 20 | 50 | 69 | −19 | 60 |

Source: EFL Official Website
Rules for classification: 1) Points; 2) Goal difference; 3) Number of goals scored; 4) Head-to-head results; 5) Wins; 6) Away goals; 7) Penalty points (sec 9.5); 8) 12-point sending off offences

==== Results summary ====
| Overall | | | | | | | | Home | | | | | | Away | | | | | |
| Pld | W | D | L | GF | GA | GD | Pts | W | D | L | GF | GA | GD | W | D | L | GF | GA | GD |
|---|---|---|---|---|---|---|---|---|---|---|---|---|---|---|---|---|---|---|---|
| 46 | 16 | 15 | 15 | 64 | 60 | +4 | 63 | 10 | 7 | 6 | 33 | 28 | +5 | 6 | 8 | 9 | 31 | 32 | −1 |

Last updated: 2 May 2026.
Source: Soccerway

==== Results by round ====
| Round | 1 | 2 | 3 | 4 | 5 | 6 | 8 | 9 | 10 | 11 | 12 | 13 | 7^{1} | 14 | 15 | 17 | 18 | 19 | 20 | 21 | 22 | 23 | 24 | 25 | 27 | 28 | 29 | 30 | 31 | 16 | 32 | 33 | 34 | 35 | 36 | 26 | 37 | 38 | 39 | 40 | 41 | 42 | 43 | 44 | 45 | 46 |
|---|---|---|---|---|---|---|---|---|---|---|---|---|---|---|---|---|---|---|---|---|---|---|---|---|---|---|---|---|---|---|---|---|---|---|---|---|---|---|---|---|---|---|---|---|---|---|
| Ground | A | H | H | A | A | H | A | H | A | H | A | A | H | H | H | H | A | H | A | H | A | A | H | H | A | H | H | A | A | A | H | H | A | H | A | A | H | A | A | H | A | H | A | H | A | H |
| Result | L | L | L | D | D | W | L | W | D | D | D | L | W | D | W | D | W | L | L | W | W | D | W | W | L | D | D | W | L | W | W | D | D | W | W | L | D | W | L | W | D | L | L | L | D | L |
| Position | 23 | 24 | 24 | 22 | 23 | 17 | 21 | 20 | 19 | 19 | 21 | 22 | 16 | 19 | 17 | 18 | 16 | 17 | 18 | 15 | 11 | 10 | 9 | 9 | 11 | 13 | 13 | 10 | 11 | 10 | 7 | 8 | 7 | 7 | 7 | 7 | 8 | 6 | 8 | 6 | 6 | 8 | 9 | 10 | 10 | 12 |
| Points | 0 | 0 | 0 | 1 | 2 | 5 | 5 | 8 | 9 | 10 | 11 | 11 | 14 | 15 | 18 | 19 | 22 | 22 | 22 | 25 | 28 | 29 | 32 | 35 | 35 | 36 | 37 | 40 | 40 | 43 | 46 | 47 | 48 | 51 | 54 | 54 | 55 | 58 | 58 | 61 | 62 | 62 | 62 | 62 | 63 | 63 |

Source: Soccerway
A = Away; H = Home; W = Win; D = Draw; L = Loss; P = Postponed
Notes:
- ^{1} Matchday 7 (vs Northampton Town) was postponed due to the international call-ups.
- ^{2} Matchday 15 (vs Wigan Athletic) was postponed due to the international call-ups.
- ^{3} Matchday 26 (vs Mansfield Town) was postponed due to Mansfield's participation in the FA Cup.

==== Matches ====
On 26 June, the fixture list was released, with Reading starting their campaign away to Lincoln City on 2 August, and finishing the season at home to Blackpool.

| 2 August 2025 1 | Lincoln City | 2–0 | Reading | Lincoln |
| 15:00 BST (UTC+1) | Burns 20' (o.g.); Hackett 67'; Bradley (yellow card) 73' | Report | | Stadium: Sincil Bank; Attendance: 9,054; Referee: Martin Woods |

| 9 August 2025 2 | Reading | 0–2 | Huddersfield Town | Reading |
| 12:30 BST (UTC+1) | Savage (yellow card) 29'; Jacob (yellow card) 52'; Kyerewaa (yellow card) 53'; Ehibhatiomhan (yellow card) 64' | Report | Ledson (yellow card) 53'; Whatmough 74'; May (yellow card) 85'; Ashia 90+3' | Stadium: Madejski Stadium; Attendance: 12,538; Referee: Matthew Corlett |
Note: Fixture was initially scheduled for a 15:00 kick-off, but was moved for live Sky Sports broadcast.

| 16 August 2025 3 | Reading | 1–2 | AFC Wimbledon | Reading |
| 15:00 BST (UTC+1) | Stickland (yellow card) 69'; Wing 86' | Report | Stevens 32'; Browne 70'; Johnson (yellow card) 74' | Stadium: Madejski Stadium; Attendance: 13,757; Referee: Jamie O'Connor |

| 20 August 2025 4 | Bolton Wanderers | 1–1 | Reading | Horwich |
| 20:00 BST (UTC+1) | Burstow 52' | Report | O'Mahony (yellow card) 16'; Savage (yellow card) 43'; Doyle (yellow card) 65'; Kyerewaa (yellow card) 74'; D.Williams (yellow card) 78'; Garcia 84' | Stadium: Toughsheet Community Stadium; Attendance: 19,625; Referee: Tom Reeves |
Note: Fixture was initially scheduled for a 19:45 kick-off on 19 August, but was moved for live Sky Sports broadcast.

| 23 August 2025 5 | Wycombe Wanderers | 2–2 | Reading | High Wycombe |
| 15:00 BST (UTC+1) | Onyedinma 10'; Tilley 89'; Hagelskjær (yellow card) 90+2' | Report | Elliott (yellow card) 36'; Camará 42', (yellow card) 50'; Wing 44'; Lane (yellow card) 82' | Stadium: Adams Park; Attendance: 6,639; Referee: Alex Chilowicz |

| 30 August 2025 6 | Reading | 1–0 | Port Vale | Reading |
| 15:00 BST (UTC+1) | Jacob (yellow card) 45+6'; Lane 66'; Ahmed (yellow card) 74' | Report | Heneghan (yellow card) 47'; Croasdale (yellow card) 56' | Stadium: Madejski Stadium; Attendance: 12,624; Referee: Thomas Parsons |
Note: Manager Noel Hunt was sent-off in the 52nd minute for kicking the ball away

| 13 September 2025 8 | Barnsley | 3–2 | Reading | Barnsley |
| 15:00 BST (UTC+1) | Earl 9'; Keillor-Dunn (yellow card) 37', (goal) 55'; Phillips 59' (pen.); Connell (yellow card) 88'; Cooper (yellow card) 90+6' | Report | Jacob (yellow card) 22'; Marriott 35'; Savage (yellow card) 38'; Ahmed (yellow card) 45+2'; Kyerewaa 66', (yellow card) 70'; Burns (yellow card) 73' | Stadium: Oakwell; Attendance: 10,803; Referee: Elliot Bell |

| 20 September 2025 9 | Reading | 2–1 | Leyton Orient | Reading |
| 15:00 BST (UTC+1) | Marriott 21'; D.Williams (yellow card) 45+5'; Ahmed (yellow card) 51'; Wing (yellow card) 76'; Fraser 79'; Garcia (yellow card) 90+5'; Ritchie (yellow card) 90+8' | Report | El Mizouni 48'; James (yellow card) 50'; Abdulai (yellow card) 84'; Koroma (yellow card) 90+1' | Stadium: Madjeski Stadium; Attendance: 12,553; Referee: Ollie Yates |

| 27 September 2025 10 | Stockport County | 1–1 | Reading | Edgeley |
| 15:00 BST (UTC+1) | Wootton 22'; Bailey (yellow card) 75' | Report | Marriott 72'; Burns (yellow card) 74' | Stadium: Edgeley Park; Attendance: 9,249; Referee: Oliver Mackey |

| 4 October 2025 11 | Reading | 1–1 | Mansfield Town | Reading |
| 15:00 BST (UTC+1) | Burns (yellow card) 66'; Marriott 71'; Ritchie (yellow card) 90+2' | Report | T.Roberts 7'; Knoyle (yellow card) 90+6' | Stadium: Madjeski Stadium; Attendance: 12,328; Referee: Paul Tierney |

| 11 October 2025 12 | Exeter City | 1–1 | Reading | Exeter |
| 15:00 BST (UTC+1) | Wareham 11' (yellow card) 90+4' | Report | Marriott 6'; Ritchie (yellow card) 56' | Stadium: St James Park; Attendance: 7,361; Referee: James Durkin |

| 18 October 2025 13 | Cardiff City | 2–1 | Reading | Cardiff |
| 15:00 BST (UTC+1) | Kellyman 49'; Salech 65'; Trott (yellow card) 76' | Report | Wing 38' | Stadium: Cardiff City Stadium; Attendance: 20,363; Referee: Lee Swabey |

| 21 October 2025 7 | Reading | 1–0 | Northampton Town | Reading |
| 20:00 BST (UTC+1) | D.Williams (yellow card) 55'; Ehibhatiomhan 65'; Jacob (yellow card) 87'; Kyerewaa (yellow card) 90+2' | Report | | Stadium: Madejski Stadium; Attendance: 9,228; Referee: Abigail Byrne |
Note: Match was originally scheduled for 6 September, but postponed on 29 August due to international call ups, and rearranged on 10 September to 21 October.

| 25 October 2025 14 | Reading | 1–1 | Doncaster Rovers | Reading |
| 15:00 BST (UTC+1) | Savage (yellow card) 44'; Doyle 68' | Report | Lo-Tutala (yellow card) 33'; Sharp 61' | Stadium: Madejski Stadium; Attendance: 12,003; Referee: Matthew Russell |
Note: Noel Hunt's final match in charge of Reading as he was sacked on 26 October 2025.

| 6 November 2025 15 | Reading | 1–0 | Stevenage | Reading |
| 20:00 GMT (UTC) | Savage 4'; Dorsett (yellow card) 10'; Kyerewaa (yellow card) 45+1'; Ritchie (yellow card) 70' | Report | Freestone (yellow card) 29'; Houghton (yellow card) 56'; Phillips (yellow card) 86'; White (yellow card) 88' | Stadium: Madejski Stadium; Attendance: 9,233; Referee: Ben Speedie |
Note: Fixture was initially scheduled for 8 November, but was rescheduled for live Sky Sports broadcasting. and this was Leam Richardson's first league match in charge of Reading after his appointment on 28 October 2025

| 22 November 2025 17 | Reading | 1–1 | Rotherham United | Reading |
| 15:00 GMT (UTC) | Ritchie (yellow card) 33'; Savage 78'; Yiadom (yellow card) 90+3' | Report | Benson 20' (yellow card) 24'; Yearwood (yellow card) 58'; Douglas (yellow card) 88' | Stadium: Madejski Stadium; Attendance: 15,279; Referee: Alan Young |

| 29 November 2025 18 | Blackpool | 0–3 | Reading | Blackpool |
| 12:30 GMT (UTC) | Casey (yellow card) 27' | Report | Doyle 28'; Wing 69' (pen.); R.Williams 81' | Stadium: Bloomfield Road; Attendance: 9,272; Referee: Thomas Parsons |
Note: Fixture was initially scheduled for a 15:00 kick-off, but was rescheduled for live Sky Sports broadcasting.

| 9 December 2025 19 | Reading | 1–2 | Peterborough United | Reading |
| 20:00 GMT (UTC) | Ehibhatiomhan (yellow card) 52' (goal) 60' | Report | Morgan 2' (yellow card) 58'; Woods (yellow card) 38'; Leonard 68'; Mills (yellow card) 73' | Stadium: Madejski Stadium; Attendance: 9,183; Referee: Craig Hicks |

| 13 December 2025 20 | Bradford City | 2–0 | Reading | Bradford |
| 15:00 GMT (UTC) | Sarcevic 56'; Pointon 84'; Halliday (yellow card) 86' | Report | Ehibhatiomhan (yellow card) 41'; O'Connor (yellow card) 47'; Abrefa (yellow card) 90+2' | Stadium: Valley Parade; Attendance: 19,123; Referee: Paul Howard |

| 18 December 2025 21 | Reading | 3–2 | Luton Town | Reading |
| 20:00 GMT (UTC) | Wing 8'; Marriott 52'; Yiadom (yellow card) 72'; Ehibhatiomhan 78' (yellow card) 90' | Report | Clark 59'; Lonwijk 76'; Brown (yellow card) 77' | Stadium: Madejski Stadium; Attendance: 9,252; Referee: Edward Duckworth |
Note: Fixture was initially scheduled for 20 December, but was rescheduled for live Sky Sports broadcasting.

| 26 December 2025 22 | Plymouth Argyle | 1–4 | Reading | Plymouth |
| 15:00 GMT (UTC) | Sorinola (yellow card) 4'; Ralls (red card) 12'; Mitchell (yellow card) 65'; Amaechi 68'; Edwards (yellow card) 73' | Report | Wing 14' (pen.), 18' (yellow card) 23'; Doyle 20'; Yiadom (yellow card) 30'; Dorsett (yellow card) 80'; Marriott 86' | Stadium: Home Park; Attendance: 16,434; Referee: James Durkin |

| 29 December 2025 23 | Peterborough United | 1–1 | Reading | Peterborough |
| 19:45 GMT (UTC) | Collins (yellow card) 53'; Leonard (yellow card) 74'; Lindgren 78' | Report | Doyle (yellow card) 17'; Kyerewaa 26'; Yiadom (yellow card) 72'; Abrefa (yellow card) 90+7' | Stadium: London Road; Attendance: 7,225; Referee: Alex Chilowicz |

| 1 January 2026 24 | Reading | 2–0 | Burton Albion | Reading |
| 15:00 GMT (UTC) | Marriott 18'; Kyerewaa 37' | Report | | Stadium: Madejski Stadium; Attendance: 12,104; Referee: Tom Reeves |

| 4 January 2026 25 | Reading | 1–0 | Stockport County | Reading |
| 15:00 GMT (UTC) | O'Connor (yellow card) 65'; Wing 89' | Report | | Stadium: Madejski Stadium; Attendance: 11,703; Referee: Jacob Miles |

| 17 January 2026 27 | Leyton Orient | 3–1 | Reading | Leyton |
| 15:00 GMT (UTC) | Ballard 45', 65', 85'; Archibald (yellow card) 57'; Clare (yellow card) 78'; Cahill (yellow card) 90+9' | Report | Yiadom (yellow card) 7'; Savage (yellow card) 39'; Marriott 52'; O'Connor (yellow card) 77' | Stadium: Brisbane Road; Attendance: 8,492; Referee: Elliot Bell |

| 24 January 2026 28 | Reading | 2–2 | Barnsley | Reading |
| 15:00 GMT (UTC) | Roberts 32'; Marriott 84' | Report | Shepherd (yellow card) 19'; McGoldrick 38'; O'Keeffe (yellow card) 57'; Phillips 67'; Keillor-Dunn (yellow card) 84' | Stadium: Madejski Stadium; Attendance: 12,101; Referee: Leigh Doughty |

| 27 January 2026 29 | Reading | 2–2 | Exeter City | Reading |
| 20:00 GMT (UTC) | Keane 45+1'; Dorsett (yellow card) 69'; O'Connor 75' (yellow card) 78'; Roberts (yellow card) 79'; Nyambe (yellow card) 90+6' | Report | Sweeney 14'; Woodhouse (yellow card) 74' (goal) 90+3'; Tutierov (yellow card) 90+11' | Stadium: Madejski Stadium; Attendance: 8,404; Referee: Charles Breakspear |

| 31 January 2026 30 | Northampton Town | 0–2 | Reading | Northampton |
| 14:00 GMT (UTC) | Moore (yellow card) 57'; McGeehan (yellow card) 67' | Report | Savage (yellow card) 52'; Marriott 55'; Keane 58'; Yiadom (yellow card) 90+2'; Roberts (yellow card) 90+4' | Stadium: Sixfields Stadium; Attendance: 7,038; Referee: Jamie O'Connor |
Note: Fixture was initially scheduled for 15:00hrs on 31 January, but brought forward to 14:00hrs due to Northampton Saints hosting Leicester Tigers in the Premiership Rugby Cup later the same day.

| 7 February 2026 31 | AFC Wimbledon | 3–2 | Reading | Wimbledon |
| 15:01 GMT (UTC) | Browne 8', 53', 71' | Report | Marriott 33'; Dorsett 65'; O'Connor (yellow card) 69' | Stadium: Plough Lane; Attendance: 8,574; Referee: Dale Baines |
Note: Match kicked off at 15:01hrs in support of the British Heart Foundation and Sky Bet's Every Minute Matters campaign.

| 10 February 2026 16 | Wigan Athletic | 1–2 | Reading | Wigan |
| 19:45 GMT (UTC) | Taylor 66'; Wright (yellow card) 85' | Report | Doyle (yellow card) 42'; Dorsett 48'; O'Connor 87' | Stadium: Brick Community Stadium; Attendance: 7,973; Referee: Lee Swabey |
Note: Match originally scheduled for 15:00hrs on 15 November 2025, but was postponed on 7 November 2025 due to international call ups, and later rearranged for 19:45hrs on 10 February 2026.

| 14 February 2026 32 | Reading | 3–2 | Wycombe Wanderers | Reading |
| 12:30 GMT (UTC) | Marriott 8', 44', 74'; Young (yellow card) 31'; O'Connor (yellow card) 64'; Savage (yellow card) 90+3' | Report | Casey 50'; Harris (yellow card) 66'; Hagelskjær 72'; Vidigal (yellow card) 90+3' | Stadium: Madejski Stadium; Attendance: 13,105; Referee: Martin Woods |
Note: Fixture was initially scheduled for 15:00 on 14 November, but was rescheduled for live Sky Sports broadcasting.

| 17 February 2026 33 | Reading | 1–1 | Bolton Wanderers | Reading |
| 20:00 GMT (UTC) | O'Connor (yellow card) 27'; Marriott 36'; Doyle (yellow card) 42'; Savage (yellow card) 80'; Ehibhatiomhan (yellow card) 85' | Report | Burstow 90+6'; Forino-Joseph (yellow card) 90+10' | Stadium: Madejski Stadium; Attendance: 10,025; Referee: Peter Wright |

| 21 February 2026 34 | Port Vale | 1–1 | Reading | Burslem |
| 15:00 GMT (UTC) | Sherif 90+6' | Report | Wing 39' (pen.); Ward (yellow card) 53'; Dorsett (yellow card) 80' | Stadium: Vale Park; Attendance: 7,023; Referee: Carl Brook |

| 28 February 2026 35 | Reading | 2–1 | Bradford City | Reading |
| 15:00 GMT (UTC) | D.Williams (yellow card) 34'; Patton (yellow card) 87'; Lane 90'; Ritchie 90+7'; Ehibhatiomhan (yellow card) 90+10' | Report | Pennington 68' | Stadium: Madejski Stadium; Attendance: 13,106; Referee: Ben Speedie |

| 7 March 2026 36 | Luton Town | 2–3 | Reading | Luton |
| 15:00 GMT (UTC) | Lonwijk 45+3'; Saville 53'; Clark (yellow card) 70' | Report | Ehibhatiomhan 5', 81', 84'; Fraser (yellow card) 21'; O'Connor (yellow card) 44'; D.Williams (yellow card) 80'; Pereira (yellow card) 90+1' | Stadium: Kenilworth Road; Attendance: 11,374; Referee: Oliver Mackey |

| 10 March 2026 26 | Mansfield Town | 1–0 | Reading | Mansfield |
| 19:45 GMT (UTC) | Reed 69' | Report | Burns (yellow card) 19'; Wing (yellow card) 90+3' | Stadium: Field Mill; Attendance: 7,218; Referee: Thomas Parsons |
Note: Match originally scheduled for 15:00hrs on 10 January 2026, but was postponed due to Mansfield Town's participation in the Third Round of the FA cup that same weekend, and rescheduled to 10 March 2026 on 26 January 2026.

| 14 March 2026 37 | Reading | 2–2 | Plymouth Argyle | Reading |
| 15:00 GMT (UTC) | R.Williams 3'; O'Connor 18'; Nyambe (yellow card) 45+1' | Report | Pepple (yellow card) 1'; Mitchell 6' (yellow card) 31'; Curtis (yellow card) 55'; Watts 67' | Stadium: Madejski Stadium; Attendance: 16,277; Referee: Seb Stockbridge |

| 17 March 2026 38 | Burton Albion | 1–2 | Reading | Burton upon Trent |
| 19:45 GMT (UTC) | Evans 25'; Beesley (yellow card) 90+6' | Report | Doyle 33'; Wing (yellow card) 77'; Ehibhatiomhan 88' | Stadium: Pirelli Stadium; Attendance: 2,902; Referee: Edward Duckworth |

| 21 March 2026 39 | Stevenage | 1–0 | Reading | Stevenage |
| 15:00 GMT (UTC) | Reid (yellow card) 15'; Kemp 85'; D.Phillips (yellow card) 90+4' | Report | Dorsett (yellow card) 55'; O'Connor (yellow card) 70' | Stadium: Broadhall Way; Attendance: 4,502; Referee: Scott Oldham |

| 28 March 2026 40 | Reading | 3–0 | Wigan Athletic | Reading |
| 15:00 GMT (UTC) | Ehibhatiomhan 9', 63'; Aimson 19' (o.g.) | Report | | Stadium: Madejski Stadium; Attendance: 11,981; Referee: Steven Copeland |

| 3 April 2026 41 | Huddersfield Town | 1–1 | Reading | Huddersfield |
| 15:00 BST (UTC+1) | Ledson (yellow card) 69'; Sabine (yellow card) 84'; Sørensen 90+6' | Report | O'Connor (yellow card) 24'; Wing 44' (pen.) (yellow card) 69'; Savage (yellow card) 45'; Dorsett (yellow card) 66' | Stadium: Kirklees Stadium; Attendance: 17,148; Referee: Will Finnie |

| 6 April 2026 42 | Reading | 1–2 | Lincoln City | Reading |
| 15:00 BST (UTC+1) | Burns (yellow card) 84'; Wing 90+2' | Report | Oné 5'; Jefferies (yellow card) 66'; Lloyd (yellow card) 90+3'; Moylan 90+6' | Stadium: Madejski Stadium; Attendance: 17,144; Referee: Simon Mather |

| 11 April 2026 43 | Doncaster Rovers | 1–0 | Reading | Doncaster |
| 15:00 BST (UTC+1) | Bailey 58'; Hanlan (yellow card) 90+6' | Report | Savage (yellow card) 37'; Kyerewaa (yellow card) 67' | Stadium: Eco-Power Stadium; Attendance: 8,904; Referee: Scott Jackson |

| 18 April 2026 44 | Reading | 1–3 | Cardiff City | Reading |
| 15:00 BST (UTC+1) | Kyerewaa (yellow card) 63' (goal) 73'; O'Connor (yellow card) 64'; Burns (yellow card) 69' | Report | R.Colwill 40'; Osho (yellow card) 41'; Kellyman 55'; Wintle (yellow card) 63'; Lawlor (yellow card) 72'; Ng 86'; Fish (yellow card) 90+10' | Stadium: Madejski Stadium; Attendance: 13,938; Referee: Matthew Corlett |

| 25 April 2026 45 | Rotherham United | 1–1 | Reading | Rotherham |
| 15:00 BST (UTC+1) | Adegboyega (yellow card) 14'; Hall (yellow card) 15'; Nombe 25'; Baptiste (yellow card) 90' | Report | Kyerewaa 47'; Lane (yellow card) 80'; Roberts (yellow card) 87' | Stadium: New York Stadium; Attendance: 8,029; Referee: John Brooks |

| 2 May 2026 46 | Reading | 0–1 | Blackpool | Reading |
| 15:00 BST (UTC+1) | | Report | Hamilton 75'; Casey (yellow card) 81' | Stadium: Madejski Stadium; Attendance: 12,602; Referee: Elliot Bell |

=== FA Cup ===
Reading were drawn at home to Carlisle United in the first round.

| 1 November 2025 First round | Reading | 2–3 (a.e.t.) | Carlisle United | Reading |
| 15:00 GMT (UTC) | Wing 32'; Yiadom (yellow card) 50'; O'Mahony 68'; Garcia (yellow card) 83'; Savage (yellow card) 90+2'; Abrefa (yellow card) 104' | Report | Linney 90+3', 90+8', 94', (yellow card) 115'; Hayden (yellow card) 113' | Stadium: Madejski Stadium; Attendance: 3,929; Referee: Ruebyn Ricardo |
Note: This was Leam Richardson's first match in charge of Reading after his appointment on 28 October 2025

=== EFL Cup ===
Reading were drawn against EFL Championship club Portsmouth at Fratton Park in the first round with the two sides having recently met in a pre-season friendly at the Madejski Stadium with the Royals losing 4–0. In the second round, a home tie against fellow League One club AFC Wimbledon was drawn with the two sides recently meeting at the same ground in the league with Wimbledon emerging victorious by a score-line of 2–1. On 27 August, Reading were drawn away to Wrexham in the third round, with the tie confirmed to be played on 23 September on 3 September.

| 12 August 2025 First round | Portsmouth | 1–2 | Reading | Portsmouth |
| 19:45 BST (UTC+1) | Le Roux (yellow card) 53'; Singerr 90+3'; Poole (yellow card) 90+5' | Report | Garcia 34'; Ehibhatiomhan 38'; Fraser (yellow card) 80'; Ryan (yellow card) 90' | Stadium: Fratton Park; Attendance: 14,525; Referee: Farai Hallam |

| 26 August 2025 Second round | Reading | 2–1 | AFC Wimbledon | Reading |
| 19:00 BST (UTC+1) | Fraser 24'; Camará 70' | Report | Bugiel 26'; Sasu (yellow card) 58' | Stadium: Madejski Stadium; Attendance: 3,860; Referee: Jacob Miles |

| 23 September 2025 Third round | Wrexham | 2–0 | Reading | Wrexham |
| 19:45 BST (UTC+1) | Thomason (yellow card) 34'; Broadhead 57'; Smith 70' | Report | | Stadium: Racecourse Ground; Attendance: 9,457; Referee: Simon Mather |

=== EFL Trophy ===
==== Group stage ====
On 25 June, Reading were drawn into Southern Group D alongside Swindon Town and Milton Keynes Dons and an unnamed U21 team, which was named as West Ham United the following day. On 6 August, Reading confirmed the details for their matches with Swindon and Milton Keynes. On 29 August, Reading confirmed that their home match against West Ham United U21's would take place on 30 September at 19:00hrs.

| Pos | Div | Team | Pld | W | PW | PL | L | GF | GA | GD | Pts | Qualification |
|---|---|---|---|---|---|---|---|---|---|---|---|---|
| 1 | L2 | Swindon Town | 3 | 2 | 0 | 0 | 1 | 9 | 5 | +4 | 6 | Advance to Round 2 |
| 2 | ACA | West Ham United U21 | 3 | 2 | 0 | 0 | 1 | 9 | 6 | +3 | 6 | Advance to Round 2 |
| 3 | L1 | Reading | 3 | 2 | 0 | 0 | 1 | 6 | 4 | +2 | 6 | |
| 4 | L2 | Milton Keynes Dons | 3 | 0 | 0 | 0 | 3 | 1 | 10 | −9 | 0 | |

Source: EFL

| 2 September 2025 1 | Swindon Town | 3–2 | Reading | Swindon |
| 19:00 BST (UTC+1) | P.Ehibhatiomhan 11'; Palmer 24'; Wright 47' | Report | Ward 36' (o.g.); Marriott 44'; Abrefa (yellow card) 67' | Stadium: County Ground; Attendance: 3,667; Referee: Sam Mulhall |

| 30 September 2025 2 | Reading | 3–1 | West Ham United U21 | Reading |
| 19:00 BST (UTC+1) | Abrefa (yellow card) 40'; Borgnis (yellow card) 59' (goal) 64'; O'Mahony 88' (pen.); Okine-Peters 90+7' | Report | Marshall 9'; Scarles (yellow card) 59'; Souček (yellow card) 63'; Golambeckis (yellow card) 87'; Adeile (yellow card) 90+8' | Stadium: Madejski Stadium; Attendance: 1,247; Referee: Kirsty Dowle |

| 7 October 2025 3 | Reading | 1–0 | Milton Keynes Dons | Reading |
| 19:00 BST (UTC+1) | Spencer (yellow card) 31'; Lane (yellow card) 32'; Patton 88' | Report | Lewis-Burgess (yellow card) 38'; Troso (yellow card) 71'; Thompson-Sommers (yellow card) 74' | Stadium: Madejski Stadium; Attendance: 1,623; Referee: David Rock |

== Squad statistics ==
=== Appearances and goals ===
As of match played 2 May 2026

Players with no appearances are not included on the list
Italics indicate a loaned in player

| No. | Pos | Nat | Player | Total | | League One | | FA Cup | | League Cup | | League Trophy | |
| No. | Pos | Nat | Player | Apps | Goals | Apps | Goals | Apps | Goals | Apps | Goals | Apps | Goals |
|---|---|---|---|---|---|---|---|---|---|---|---|---|---|
| 1 | GK | (Portugal) POR | Joel Pereira | 43 | 0 | 43 | 0 | 0 | 0 | 0 | 0 | 0 | 0 |
| 2 | DF | (Ghana) GHA | Kelvin Abrefa | 27 | 0 | 12+10 | 0 | 0+1 | 0 | 2 | 0 | 2 | 0 |
| 3 | DF | (Montserrat) MSR | Jeriel Dorsett | 42 | 2 | 33+6 | 2 | 1 | 0 | 1 | 0 | 1 | 0 |
| 4 | MF | (Cameroon) CMR | Ben Elliott | 13 | 0 | 6+2 | 0 | 0 | 0 | 1+2 | 0 | 2 | 0 |
| 5 | DF | (England) ENG | Haydon Roberts | 14 | 1 | 9+5 | 1 | 0 | 0 | 0 | 0 | 0 | 0 |
| 6 | MF | (Canada) CAN | Liam Fraser | 37 | 2 | 18+15 | 1 | 0 | 0 | 1+2 | 1 | 1 | 0 |
| 7 | FW | (England) ENG | Jack Marriott | 25 | 17 | 20+4 | 16 | 0 | 0 | 0 | 0 | 1 | 1 |
| 8 | MF | (Wales) WAL | Charlie Savage | 46 | 2 | 40+3 | 2 | 1 | 0 | 1+1 | 0 | 0 | 0 |
| 9 | FW | (Nigeria) NGR | Kelvin Ehibhatiomhan | 47 | 10 | 21+21 | 9 | 1 | 0 | 2 | 1 | 2 | 0 |
| 10 | MF | (England) ENG | Lewis Wing | 48 | 12 | 46 | 11 | 1 | 1 | 0+1 | 0 | 0 | 0 |
| 11 | MF | (Germany) GER | Daniel Kyerewaa | 38 | 5 | 29+4 | 5 | 1 | 0 | 1+2 | 0 | 0+1 | 0 |
| 12 | DF | (England) ENG | Finley Burns | 33 | 0 | 20+12 | 0 | 0 | 0 | 1 | 0 | 0 | 0 |
| 14 | MF | (Zimbabwe) ZIM | Tivonge Rushesha | 5 | 0 | 0 | 0 | 0 | 0 | 2+1 | 0 | 2 | 0 |
| 15 | DF | (Republic of Ireland) IRL | Paudie O'Connor | 36 | 3 | 36 | 3 | 0 | 0 | 0 | 0 | 0 | 0 |
| 16 | DF | (England) ENG | Benn Ward | 8 | 0 | 8 | 0 | 0 | 0 | 0 | 0 | 0 | 0 |
| 17 | DF | (Ghana) GHA | Andy Yiadom | 31 | 0 | 10+19 | 0 | 1 | 0 | 0 | 0 | 1 | 0 |
| 18 | MF | (Zimbabwe) ZIM | Andy Rinomhota | 3 | 0 | 1+2 | 0 | 0 | 0 | 0 | 0 | 0 | 0 |
| 19 | MF | (England) ENG | Kadan Young | 7 | 0 | 3+4 | 0 | 0 | 0 | 0 | 0 | 0 | 0 |
| 20 | FW | (Republic of Ireland) IRL | Mark O'Mahony | 21 | 2 | 5+11 | 0 | 0+1 | 1 | 1+2 | 0 | 1 | 1 |
| 21 | MF | (England) ENG | Randell Williams | 15 | 2 | 12+3 | 2 | 0 | 0 | 0 | 0 | 0 | 0 |
| 22 | DF | (England) ENG | Michael Stickland | 11 | 0 | 3+1 | 0 | 1 | 0 | 3 | 0 | 3 | 0 |
| 24 | DF | (Namibia) NAM | Ryan Nyambe | 19 | 0 | 17+2 | 0 | 0 | 0 | 0 | 0 | 0 | 0 |
| 25 | GK | (England) ENG | Jack Stevens | 10 | 0 | 3 | 0 | 1 | 0 | 3 | 0 | 3 | 0 |
| 26 | FW | (Malta) MLT | Basil Tuma | 3 | 0 | 0+1 | 0 | 0+1 | 0 | 0 | 0 | 0+1 | 0 |
| 27 | FW | (Republic of Ireland) IRL | Will Keane | 14 | 2 | 5+9 | 2 | 0 | 0 | 0 | 0 | 0 | 0 |
| 28 | MF | (Guinea) GUI | Mamadi Camará | 14 | 2 | 3+8 | 1 | 0+1 | 0 | 1+1 | 1 | 0 | 0 |
| 29 | MF | (England) ENG | Kamari Doyle | 46 | 4 | 33+8 | 4 | 1 | 0 | 3 | 0 | 1 | 0 |
| 30 | MF | (Scotland) SCO | Matt Ritchie | 29 | 1 | 7+21 | 1 | 0 | 0 | 0 | 0 | 0+1 | 0 |
| 32 | MF | (Northern Ireland) NIR | Paddy Lane | 38 | 2 | 20+14 | 2 | 1 | 0 | 1+1 | 0 | 1 | 0 |
| 33 | DF | (Republic of Ireland) IRL | Derrick Williams | 24 | 0 | 23+1 | 0 | 0 | 0 | 0 | 0 | 0 | 0 |
| 34 | MF | (England) ENG | Joseph Barough | 1 | 0 | 0 | 0 | 0 | 0 | 0 | 0 | 1 | 0 |
| 36 | DF | (Republic of Ireland) IRL | John Ryan | 6 | 0 | 0 | 0 | 0 | 0 | 2+1 | 0 | 3 | 0 |
| 37 | MF | (England) ENG | Luke Howard | 1 | 0 | 0+1 | 0 | 0 | 0 | 0 | 0 | 0 | 0 |
| 38 | DF | (Ghana) GHA | Philip Duah | 2 | 0 | 0 | 0 | 0 | 0 | 0 | 0 | 0+2 | 0 |
| 39 | DF | (England) ENG | Ashqar Ahmed | 12 | 0 | 8+1 | 0 | 0 | 0 | 1+1 | 0 | 0+1 | 0 |
| 42 | DF | (England) ENG | Boyd Beacroft | 1 | 0 | 0 | 0 | 0 | 0 | 0 | 0 | 0+1 | 0 |
| 43 | FW | (England) ENG | Jeremiah Okine-Peters | 4 | 1 | 0 | 0 | 0 | 0 | 1 | 0 | 3 | 1 |
| 44 | MF | (England) ENG | Tyler Sackey | 3 | 0 | 0 | 0 | 0 | 0 | 0 | 0 | 1+2 | 0 |
| 46 | MF | (New Zealand) NZL | Jacob Borgnis | 3 | 1 | 0 | 0 | 0 | 0 | 0 | 0 | 2+1 | 1 |
| 47 | MF | (England) ENG | Shay Spencer | 4 | 0 | 0 | 0 | 0 | 0 | 1 | 0 | 2+1 | 0 |
| 49 | MF | (England) ENG | Emmanuel Osho | 2 | 0 | 0+2 | 0 | 0 | 0 | 0 | 0 | 0 | 0 |
| 55 | FW | (Northern Ireland) NIR | Reece Evans | 1 | 0 | 0 | 0 | 0 | 0 | 0 | 0 | 0+1 | 0 |
| 57 | FW | (Republic of Ireland) IRL | Sean Patton | 8 | 1 | 1+5 | 0 | 0 | 0 | 0 | 0 | 0+2 | 1 |
Players who featured but departed the club permanently during the season:
| 5 | DF | (England) ENG | Matty Jacob | 16 | 0 | 10+4 | 0 | 1 | 0 | 1 | 0 | 0 | 0 |
| 19 | MF | (England) ENG | Andre Garcia | 13 | 2 | 1+8 | 1 | 0+1 | 0 | 3 | 1 | 0 | 0 |

=== Goal scorers ===
As of match played 2 May 2026

| Place | Position | Nation | Number | Name | League One | FA Cup | League Cup | League Trophy | Total |
|---|---|---|---|---|---|---|---|---|---|
| 1 | FW | (England) | 7 | Jack Marriott | 16 | 0 | 0 | 1 | 17 |
| 2 | MF | (England) | 10 | Lewis Wing | 11 | 1 | 0 | 0 | 12 |
| 3 | FW | (Nigeria) | 9 | Kelvin Ehibhatiomhan | 9 | 0 | 1 | 0 | 10 |
| 4 | MF | (Germany) | 11 | Daniel Kyerewaa | 5 | 0 | 0 | 0 | 5 |
| 5 | MF | (England) | 29 | Kamari Doyle | 4 | 0 | 0 | 0 | 4 |
| 6 | DF | (Republic of Ireland) | 15 | Paudie O'Connor | 3 | 0 | 0 | 0 | 3 |
| 7 | MF | (Wales) | 8 | Charlie Savage | 2 | 0 | 0 | 0 | 2 |
| 7 | FW | (Republic of Ireland) | 27 | Will Keane | 2 | 0 | 0 | 0 | 2 |
| 7 | DF | (Montserrat) | 3 | Jeriel Dorsett | 2 | 0 | 0 | 0 | 2 |
| 7 | MF | (Northern Ireland) | 32 | Paddy Lane | 2 | 0 | 0 | 0 | 2 |
| 7 | MF | (England) | 21 | Randell Williams | 2 | 0 | 0 | 0 | 2 |
| 7 | MF | (England) | 19 | Andre Garcia | 1 | 0 | 1 | 0 | 2 |
| 7 | MF | (Guinea) | 28 | Mamadi Camará | 1 | 0 | 1 | 0 | 2 |
| 7 | MF | (Canada) | 6 | Liam Fraser | 1 | 0 | 1 | 0 | 2 |
| 7 | FW | (Republic of Ireland) | 20 | Mark O'Mahony | 0 | 1 | 0 | 1 | 2 |
| 7 | | | | Own goal | 1 | 0 | 0 | 1 | 2 |
| 17 | DF | (England) | 5 | Haydon Roberts | 1 | 0 | 0 | 0 | 1 |
| 17 | MF | (Scotland) | 30 | Matt Ritchie | 1 | 0 | 0 | 0 | 1 |
| 17 | MF | (New Zealand) | 46 | Jacob Borgnis | 0 | 0 | 0 | 1 | 1 |
| 17 | FW | (England) | 43 | Jeremiah Okine-Peters | 0 | 0 | 0 | 1 | 1 |
| 17 | FW | (Republic of Ireland) | 57 | Sean Patton | 0 | 0 | 0 | 1 | 1 |
| Total | | | | | 64 | 2 | 4 | 6 | 76 |

=== Clean sheets ===
As of match played 2 May 2026

| Place | Position | Nation | Number | Name | League One | FA Cup | League Cup | League Trophy | Total |
|---|---|---|---|---|---|---|---|---|---|
| 1 | GK | (Portugal) | 1 | Joel Pereira | 7 | 0 | 0 | 0 | 7 |
| 2 | GK | (England) | 25 | Jack Stevens | 1 | 0 | 0 | 1 | 2 |
| Total | | | | | 8 | 0 | 0 | 1 | 9 |

=== Disciplinary record ===
As of match played 2 May 2026

| Number | Nation | Position | Name | League One | | FA Cup | | League Cup | | League Trophy | | Total | |
| Number | Nation | Position | Name | Yellow card | Red card | Yellow card | Red card | Yellow card | Red card | Yellow card | Red card | Yellow card | Red card |
|---|---|---|---|---|---|---|---|---|---|---|---|---|---|
| 1 | (Portugal) | GK | Joel Pereira | 1 | 0 | 0 | 0 | 0 | 0 | 0 | 0 | 1 | 0 |
| 2 | (Ghana) | DF | Kelvin Abrefa | 2 | 0 | 1 | 0 | 0 | 0 | 2 | 0 | 5 | 0 |
| 3 | (Montserrat) | DF | Jeriel Dorsett | 6 | 0 | 0 | 0 | 0 | 0 | 0 | 0 | 6 | 0 |
| 4 | (Cameroon) | MF | Ben Elliott | 1 | 0 | 0 | 0 | 0 | 0 | 0 | 0 | 1 | 0 |
| 5 | (England) | DF | Haydon Roberts | 3 | 0 | 0 | 0 | 0 | 0 | 0 | 0 | 3 | 0 |
| 6 | (Canada) | MF | Liam Fraser | 1 | 0 | 0 | 0 | 1 | 0 | 0 | 0 | 2 | 0 |
| 8 | (Wales) | MF | Charlie Savage | 10 | 0 | 1 | 0 | 0 | 0 | 0 | 0 | 11 | 0 |
| 9 | (Nigeria) | FW | Kelvin Ehibhatiomhan | 6 | 0 | 0 | 0 | 0 | 0 | 0 | 0 | 6 | 0 |
| 10 | (England) | MF | Lewis Wing | 5 | 0 | 0 | 0 | 0 | 0 | 0 | 0 | 5 | 0 |
| 11 | (Germany) | MF | Daniel Kyerewaa | 7 | 0 | 0 | 0 | 0 | 0 | 0 | 0 | 7 | 0 |
| 12 | (England) | DF | Finley Burns | 6 | 0 | 0 | 0 | 0 | 0 | 0 | 0 | 6 | 0 |
| 15 | (Republic of Ireland) | DF | Paudie O'Connor | 11 | 0 | 0 | 0 | 0 | 0 | 0 | 0 | 11 | 0 |
| 16 | (England) | DF | Benn Ward | 1 | 0 | 0 | 0 | 0 | 0 | 0 | 0 | 1 | 0 |
| 17 | (Ghana) | DF | Andy Yiadom | 6 | 0 | 1 | 0 | 0 | 0 | 0 | 0 | 7 | 0 |
| 19 | (England) | MF | Kadan Young | 1 | 0 | 0 | 0 | 0 | 0 | 0 | 0 | 1 | 0 |
| 20 | (Republic of Ireland) | FW | Mark O'Mahony | 1 | 0 | 0 | 0 | 0 | 0 | 0 | 0 | 1 | 0 |
| 22 | (England) | DF | Michael Stickland | 1 | 0 | 0 | 0 | 0 | 0 | 0 | 0 | 1 | 0 |
| 24 | (Namibia) | DF | Ryan Nyambe | 2 | 0 | 0 | 0 | 0 | 0 | 0 | 0 | 2 | 0 |
| 28 | (Guinea) | MF | Mamadi Camará | 1 | 0 | 0 | 0 | 0 | 0 | 0 | 0 | 1 | 0 |
| 29 | (England) | MF | Kamari Doyle | 4 | 0 | 0 | 0 | 0 | 0 | 0 | 0 | 4 | 0 |
| 30 | (Scotland) | MF | Matt Ritchie | 5 | 0 | 0 | 0 | 0 | 0 | 0 | 0 | 5 | 0 |
| 32 | (Northern Ireland) | MF | Paddy Lane | 2 | 0 | 0 | 0 | 0 | 0 | 1 | 0 | 3 | 0 |
| 33 | (Republic of Ireland) | DF | Derrick Williams | 5 | 0 | 0 | 0 | 0 | 0 | 0 | 0 | 5 | 0 |
| 36 | (Republic of Ireland) | DF | John Ryan | 0 | 0 | 0 | 0 | 1 | 0 | 0 | 0 | 1 | 0 |
| 39 | (England) | DF | Ashqar Ahmed | 3 | 0 | 0 | 0 | 0 | 0 | 0 | 0 | 3 | 0 |
| 46 | (New Zealand) | MF | Jacob Borgnis | 0 | 0 | 0 | 0 | 0 | 0 | 1 | 0 | 1 | 0 |
| 47 | (England) | MF | Shay Spencer | 0 | 0 | 0 | 0 | 0 | 0 | 1 | 0 | 1 | 0 |
| 57 | (Republic of Ireland) | FW | Sean Patton | 1 | 0 | 0 | 0 | 0 | 0 | 0 | 0 | 1 | 0 |
Players who left Reading during the season:
| 5 | (England) | DF | Matty Jacob | 4 | 0 | 0 | 0 | 0 | 0 | 0 | 0 | 4 | 0 |
| 19 | (England) | MF | Andre Garcia | 1 | 0 | 1 | 0 | 0 | 0 | 0 | 0 | 2 | 0 |
| Total | | | | 96 | 0 | 4 | 0 | 0 | 0 | 5 | 0 | 105 | 0 |
