= Ron Gourlay =

British football executive

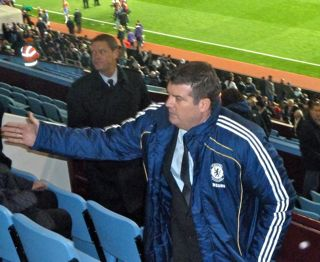
- Gourlay whilst CEO of Chelsea Football Club

CEO of West Bromwich Albion Football Club
- In office 2022–2024
- Preceded by: Xu Ke

CEO of Reading Football Club
- In office 2017–2018
- Preceded by: Nigel Howe
- Succeeded by: Nigel Howe

CEO of Chelsea Football Club
- In office 2009–2014
- Preceded by: Peter Kenyon
- Succeeded by: Marina Granovskaia

Personal details
- Born: Dundee, Scotland
- Occupation: Businessman

Ron Gourlay is a British businessman and a former CEO of Valencia CF, Chelsea, F.C.West Bromwich Albion and Reading.

== Football ==
=== Chelsea ===
Ron Gourlay worked at Chelsea since 2004, having previously worked for Manchester United and Umbro. He was appointed the chief executive of Chelsea on 17 September 2009, following Peter Kenyon's decision to leave the club on 31 October 2009.

He was quoted as saying: "It is a huge honour to be offered the chance to lead Chelsea". "We have a fantastic team both on and off the field and those teams can move us on to even greater success in the future. To be responsible for that is a fantastic challenge and I will be giving it my total commitment, drive and energy" after being named as the successor.

=== Reading ===
On 10 July 2017, Gourlay was appointed as CEO of Reading, leaving his role with immediate effect on 19 November 2018. Following his departure, former-Reading chairman John Madejski claimed that Gourlay did not understand the culture at Reading and that he had damaged links between the community and club during his sixteen months at the club.

=== West Bromwich Albion ===
On 2 February 2022 following the departure of then head coach Valerien Ismael, Gourlay was appointed as CEO of West Bromwich Albion.

=== Al-Ahli FC ===
On 22 January 2024 he was appointed CEO of the Saudi side Al-Ahli.

=== Valencia ===
On 31 May 2025, Gourlay became CEO of Valencia.
