= Sean Patton =

Irish footballer (born 2006)

Personal information
- Full name: Sean Joseph Patton
- Date of birth: 25 July 2006 (age 20)
- Place of birth: Letterkenny, Ireland
- Height: 1.78 m (5 ft 10 in)
- Position: Striker

Team information
- Current team: Forest Green Rovers (on loan from Reading)

Youth career
- 2020–2022: Finn Harps
- 2022–2023: Derry City
- 2025–: Reading

Senior career*
| Years | Team | Apps | (Gls) |
| 2023–2025 | Derry City | 17 | (0) |
| 2024 | → Finn Harps (loan) | 13 | (1) |
| 2025– | Reading | 6 | (0) |
| 2026 | → Aldershot Town (loan) | 6 | (5) |
| 2026– | → Forest Green Rovers (loan) | 0 | (0) |

International career^{‡}
| 2024 | Republic of Ireland U19 | 4 | (1) |
| 2026– | Republic of Ireland U21 | 1 | (0) |
- * Club domestic league appearances and goals as of 17:13, 20 November 2026 (UTC) ‡ National team caps and goals as of 18:02, 31 March 2026 (UTC)

Sean Joseph Patton (born 25 July 2006) is an Irish professional footballer who plays as a striker for Forest Green Rovers, on loan from EFL League One club Reading. Previously, Patton has played for Derry City and had loan spells at both Finn Harps and Aldershot Town.

== Club career ==
=== Youth career ===
Patton grew up in Drumkeen, County Donegal, and played for the Finn Harps under-15 side in 2020. The following year he graduated to their under-17 team, before signing for Derry City in 2022. Patton made appearances for both their under-17 and under-19 teams in 2022 and 2023, scoring 26 goals in 27 games.

=== Derry City ===
Patton signed his first professional contract with Derry City in August 2022. Patton made his League of Ireland Premier Division debut for the club against UCD in May 2023.

He signed a 3-year contract extension with Derry City in July 2024 and joined Finn Harps on loan for the remainder of their 2024 League of Ireland First Division season. He scored his first senior goal against Kerry on his debut for Finn Harps. He went on trial to Portsmouth later that month. Patton returned to Derry City at the conclusion of the 2024 season, having made 13 appearances and scored 1 goal in the First Division.

Patton was given the squad number 32 for the 2025 season, and played a greater role than before in pre-season, scoring a hat-trick against Sligo Rovers. He was identified as one of the most promising young talents in the League of Ireland at the beginning of the season.

=== Reading ===
On 1 September 2025, EFL League One club Reading announced the signing of Patton from Derry City, to a two-year contract for an undisclosed fee, with Patton joining up with their U21s squad for the 2025–26 season. He scored his first goal for the club on 8 October 2025, an 88th minute winner in a 1–0 victory over Milton Keynes Dons in the EFL Trophy. His league debut for the club came on 29 November 2025, coming off the bench as a late substitute for Kelvin Ehibhatiomhan in a 3–0 win away to Blackpool at Bloomfield Road.

==== Aldershot Town (loan) ====
On 30 January 2026, Reading announced that Patton had joined National League club Aldershot Town on loan for the remainder of the season. On 28 February 2026, Patton was recalled by Reading after scoring an impressive 5 goals in 6 appearances during his loan spell.

==== Return from loan ====
After returning to Reading, he made 5 more appearances by the end of the 2025–26 season, before suffering an injury that summer during pre-season that would keep him out of action for several months. In October 2026, while still out injured, Patton signed a new two-year-contract with the club.

On 10 November 2026, he made his return to senior football, scoring after just five minutes in a 2–2 EFL Trophy draw with Bristol Rovers.

==== Forest Green Rovers (loan) ====
On 20 November 2026, Patton returned to the National League, joining Forest Green Rovers on a short-term loan deal until January 2027.

== International career ==
Patton made his debut for the Republic of Ireland U19 team in March 2024, scoring in a 3–1 friendly win against Slovakia U19. In March 2026, Patton received his first call up to the Republic of Ireland U21 squad.

On 19 March 2026, Patton was called up to the Republic of Ireland national U21 team for the first time.

== Career statistics ==
As of match played on 10 November 2026

Appearances and goals by club, season and competition
| Club | Season | League | | | National Cup (Note: Includes FAI Cup, FA Cup) | | League Cup (Note: Includes EFL Cup) | | Continental | | Other | | Total | |
| Club | Season | Division | Apps | Goals | Apps | Goals | Apps | Goals | Apps | Goals | Apps | Goals | Apps | Goals |
|---|---|---|---|---|---|---|---|---|---|---|---|---|---|---|
| Derry City | 2023 | LOI Premier Division | 1 | 0 | 0 | 0 | – | | 0 (Note: Appearance(s) in the UEFA Europa Conference League) | 0 | 0 (Note: Appearance in the President of Ireland's Cup) | 0 | 1 | 0 |
| Derry City | 2024 | LOI Premier Division | 5 | 0 | – | | – | | 0 (Note: Appearance(s) in the UEFA Conference League) | 0 | – | | 5 | 0 |
| Derry City | 2025 | LOI Premier Division | 11 | 0 | 0 | 0 | – | | – | | – | | 11 | 0 |
| Derry City | Total | | 17 | 0 | 0 | 0 | 0 | 0 | 0 | 0 | 0 | 0 | 17 | 0 |
| Finn Harps (loan) | 2024 | LOI First Division | 13 | 1 | 0 | 0 | – | | – | | – | | 13 | 1 |
| Reading | 2025–26 | EFL League One | 6 | 0 | 0 | 0 | 0 | 0 | — | | 2 (Note: Appearances in EFL Trophy) | 1 | 8 | 1 |
| Reading | 2026–27 | EFL League One | 0 | 0 | 0 | 0 | 0 | 0 | — | | 1 | 1 | 9 | 2 |
| Reading | Total | | 6 | 0 | 0 | 0 | 0 | 0 | 0 | 0 | 3 | 2 | 9 | 2 |
| Aldershot Town (loan) | 2025–26 | National League | 6 | 5 | – | | – | | – | | – | | 6 | 5 |
| Career total | | | 42 | 6 | 0 | 0 | 0 | 0 | 0 | 0 | 3 | 2 | 45 | 8 |
