= Daniel Kyerewaa =

German footballer (born 2001)

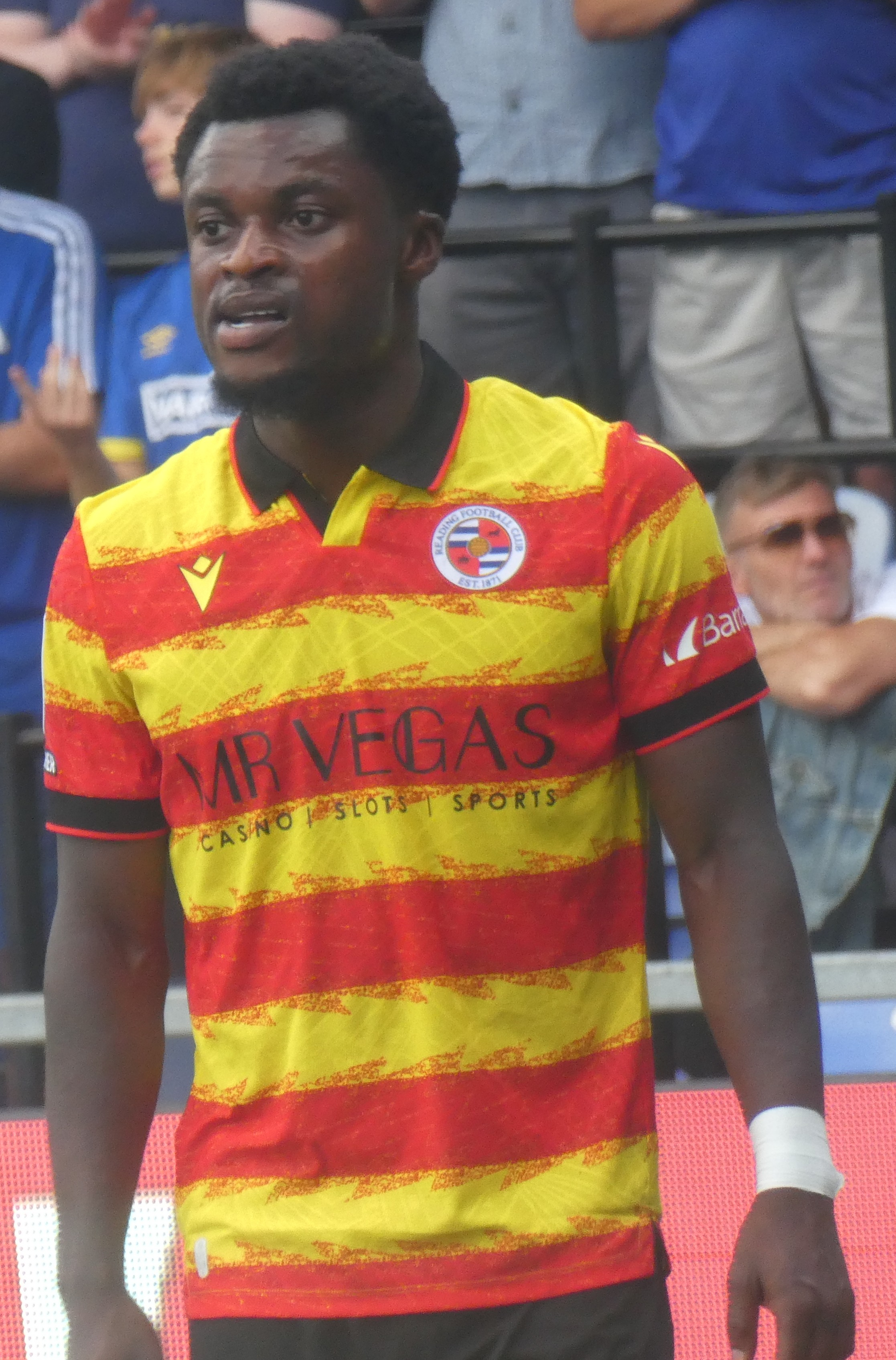
- Kyerewaa playing for Reading in 2026

Personal information
- Full name: Daniel Kamkam Kyerewaa
- Date of birth: 5 October 2001 (age 25)
- Place of birth: Düsseldorf, Germany
- Height: 1.73 m (5 ft 8 in)
- Position: Attacking midfielder

Team information
- Current team: Reading
- Number: 11

Youth career
- –2016: SG Unterrath
- 2016–2020: Fortuna Düsseldorf

Senior career*
Years	Team	Apps	(Gls)
2020–2023	Schalke 04 II	64	(14)
2022	Schalke 04	0	(0)
2023–2025	Preußen Münster	53	(5)
2025–	Reading	46	(5)
- * Club domestic league appearances and goals as of 25 April 2026

Daniel Kamkam Kyerewaa (born 5 October 2001) is a German professional footballer who plays as an attacking midfielder for EFL League One club Reading.

== Career ==
Kyerewaa joined Schalke 04 II from Fortuna Düsseldorf's youth in summer 2020. In his first season with Schalke 04's reserves he was a regular starter making 11 appearances scoring twice while also being kept out of action for five months due to a shoulder injury. He received his first call-up to the first team squad by manager Mike Büskens for a 2. Bundesliga match against Hannover 96 in March 2022, which Schalke 04 won 2–1. He received a second call-up for a match against Dynamo Dresden.

In the 2022–23 season, his third with Schalke 04 II, Kyerewaa scored 11 goals and made 3 assists in 32 appearances. When his departure from Schalke 04 was announced in May 2023, Ghanaian website Ghanasoccernet reported interest from Hamburger SV, Greuther Fürth and former club Fortuna Düsseldorf.

In May 2023 it was announced Kyerewaa would move to 3. Liga club Preußen Münster for the 2023–24 season.

On 22 July 2025, EFL League One club Reading announced the signing of Kyerewaa to a two-year contract, after he had left Preußen Münster earlier in the summer.

== Style of play ==
Kyerewaa is a versatile player. During his time at Schalke 04 II he played in midfield, usually in the centre or on the right, being deployed in defensive and attacking roles. He also made two appearances as a left winger. When he was first called up to Schalke 04's first team, he was chosen as a replacement for the injured right-back Reinhold Ranftl.

== Personal life ==
Born in Germany, Kyerewaa is of Ghanaian descent.

== Career statistics ==
As of match played 14 November 2026

Appearances and goals by club, season and competition
Club	Season	League			National cup (Note: Appearance(s) in the DFB-Pokal and FA Cup)		League cup (Note: Appearance(s) in the EFL Cup)		Other		Total	
Club	Season	Division	Apps	Goals	Apps	Goals	Apps	Goals	Apps	Goals	Apps	Goals
Schalke 04 II	2020–21	Regionalliga West	11	1	–		–		–		11	1
Schalke 04 II	2021–22	Regionalliga West	21	2	–		–		–		21	2
Schalke 04 II	2022–23	Regionalliga West	32	11	–		–		–		32	11
Schalke 04 II	Total		64	14	0	0	0	0	0	0	64	14
Preußen Münster	2023–24	3. Liga	33	2	1	0	–		–		34	2
Preußen Münster	2024–25	2. Bundesliga	20	3	1	0	–		–		21	3
Preußen Münster	Total		53	5	2	0	0	0	0	0	55	5
Reading	2025–26	EFL League One	33	5	1	0	3	0	1 (Note: Appearance(s) in the EFL Trophy)	0	38	5
Reading	2026–27	EFL League One	13	0	1	1	3	0	2	0	19	1
Reading	Total		46	5	2	1	6	0	3	0	57	6
Career total			163	24	4	1	6	0	3	0	176	25
