= Tom Norcott =

English association football player

Personal information
- Full name: Thomas Christopher Norcott
- Date of birth: 22 November 2004 (age 21)
- Place of birth: Chippenham, England
- Height: 1.86 m (6 ft 1 in)
- Position: Goalkeeper

Team information
- Current team: Derry City (on loan from Reading)
- Number: 13

Youth career
- Chippenham Town
- 2012–2023: Reading

Senior career*
Years	Team	Apps	(Gls)
2023–	Reading	0	(0)
2024	→ Beaconsfield Town (loan)	6	(0)
2025	→ Woking (loan)	6	(0)
2025	→ Enfield Town (loan)	1	(0)
2026	→ Farnborough (loan)	1	(0)
2026–	→ Derry City (loan)	7	(0)
- * Club domestic league appearances and goals as of 16:26, 9 November 2026 (UTC)

Thomas Christopher Norcott (born 22 November 2004) is an English professional footballer who plays as a goalkeeper for League of Ireland Premier Division club Derry City, on loan from League One club Reading.

== Career ==
Norcott started his career with Chippenham Town before joining Reading when he was eight. On 1 July 2023, Norcott signed his first professional contract with Reading. Norcott made his debut for Reading during their home victory against Swindon Town in the EFL Trophy group stage on 10 October 2023, replacing David Button with three minutes remaining to become the clubs 80th graduate from their academy.

On 28 March 2024, Norcott joined Beaconsfield Town on loan for the remainder of the season.

On 8 August 2025, Norcott joined National League club Woking on a short-term loan deal. Norcott was recalled from his loan spell with Woking on 15 October 2025. On 11 November 2025, Norcott joined National League South side, Enfield Town on loan until 31 January 2026. On 12 January 2026, Reading announced that Norcott had joined Farnborough on loan until 13 February 2026. After making his debut in a 1–0 home loss to Chesham United, Norcott sustained a long-term injury, which led to his loan being cut short so he could return to Reading for rehabilitation.

On 11 May 2026, with his contract due to expire on 30 June 2026, Reading announced that they had offered Norcott a new contract. On 30 June 2026, Reading announced that Norcott had signed a new two-year contract with the club.

On 3 July 2026, Norcott was loaned to League of Ireland Premier Division club Derry City until the end of their season. On 8 November 2026, he was an unused substitute in the 2026 FAI Cup final as his side defeated Waterford 1–0 at the Aviva Stadium.

== Career statistics ==
As of match played on 30 October 2026

Appearances and goals by club, season and competition
Club	Season	League			National cup (Note: Appearance(s) in the FA Cup and FAI Cup)		League cup (Note: Appearance(s) in the EFL Cup)		Continental		Other		Total	
Club	Season	Division	Apps	Goals	Apps	Goals	Apps	Goals	Apps	Goals	Apps	Goals	Apps	Goals
Reading	2023–24	League One	0	0	0	0	0	0	—		1 (Note: Appearance in the EFL Trophy)	0	1	0
Reading	2024–25	League One	0	0	0	0	0	0	—		1	0	1	0
Reading	2025–26	League One	0	0	0	0	0	0	—		0	0	0	0
Reading	2026–27	League One	0	0	0	0	0	0	—		0	0	0	0
Reading	Total		0	0	0	0	0	0	0	0	2	0	2	0
Beaconsfield Town (loan)	2023–24	Southern League Premier Division South	6	0	—		—		—		—		6	0
Woking (loan)	2025–26	National League	6	0	0	0	—		—		1 (Note: Appearance in National League Cup)	0	7	0
Enfield Town (loan)	2025–26	National League South	1	0	—		—		—		0	0	1	0
Farnborough (loan)	2025–26	National League South	1	0	—		—		—		—		1	0
Derry City (loan)	2026	League of Ireland Premier Division	7	0	2	0	—		0	0	—		9	0
Career total			21	0	2	0	0	0	0	0	3	0	26	0

== Honours ==
Derry City

- FAI Cup: 2026
