= Matty Jacob =

English footballer (born 2001)

Personal information
- Full name: Matthew James Jacob
- Date of birth: 3 June 2001 (age 25)
- Place of birth: Barnsley, England
- Height: 5 ft 11 in (1.80 m)
- Position: Left-back

Team information
- Current team: Newport County (on loan from Hull City)
- Number: 16

Youth career
- 2009–2024: Hull City

Senior career*
| Years | Team | Apps | (Gls) |
| 2019– | Hull City | 27 | (1) |
| 2019 | → Pickering Town (loan) | 12 | (0) |
| 2021–2022 | → Gateshead (loan) | 31 | (0) |
| 2025–2026 | → Reading (loan) | 14 | (0) |
| 2026– | → Newport County (loan) | 8 | (0) |
- * Club domestic league appearances and goals as of 20:26, 14 November 2026 (UTC)

Matthew James Jacob (born 3 June 2001) is an English professional footballer who plays as a left-back for EFL League Two club Newport County on loan from Premier League club Hull City.

== Personal life ==
Jacob is grandson of former Hull City defender Geoff Barker.

== Career ==
Jacob joined Hull City at Under-9s level. After progressing through the academy, he joined Pickering Town on loan in 2019, and was voted the club's Player of the Season. He then joined Gateshead on loan in August 2021.

In March 2023, he extended his contract with Hull, having first signed professionally in May 2019, and later captained the Hull U21 side on occasion. It was a new one-year deal, taking him until the end of the 2023–24 season. The contract also contained the option for a further year.

A left-back, He made his professional debut for Hull City on 1 January 2024, appearing as a second-half substitute for Liam Delap against Sheffield Wednesday in the EFL Championship. Shortly afterwards, on 6 January 2024, he made his first start for Hull City, and scored a late equalising goal against Birmingham City as they drew 1–1 in the FA Cup third round.

In February 2024, Jacob was named Hull City's Player of the Month for January. On 1 March 2024, Jacob signed a new three-year contract with Hull City.

On 24 January 2025, Jacob scored his first league goal, the second goal, in a 3–0 win at Sheffield United. On 4 July, Jacob joined EFL League One club Reading on a season-long loan move. On 2 January 2026, Reading confirmed that Jacob had returned to his parent club Hull City after his loan was ended early. On 1 September 2026 Jacob joined EFL League Two club Newport County on loan until January 2027. He made his Newport debut on 5 September 2026 in the 1-0 League Two defeat to Northampton Town.

== Career statistics ==
As of 7 February 2026

Appearances and goals by club, season and competition
| Club | Season | League | | | FA Cup | | League Cup | | Other | | Total | |
| Club | Season | Division | Apps | Goals | Apps | Goals | Apps | Goals | Apps | Goals | Apps | Goals |
|---|---|---|---|---|---|---|---|---|---|---|---|---|
| Hull City | 2021–22 | Championship | 0 | 0 | 0 | 0 | 0 | 0 | — | | 0 | 0 |
| Hull City | 2022–23 | Championship | 0 | 0 | 0 | 0 | 0 | 0 | — | | 0 | 0 |
| Hull City | 2023–24 | Championship | 14 | 0 | 1 | 1 | 0 | 0 | — | | 15 | 1 |
| Hull City | 2024–25 | Championship | 8 | 1 | 0 | 0 | 0 | 0 | — | | 8 | 1 |
| Hull City | 2025–26 | Championship | 5 | 0 | 1 | 0 | 0 | 0 | — | | 6 | 0 |
| Hull City | Total | | 27 | 1 | 2 | 1 | 0 | 0 | 0 | 0 | 29 | 2 |
| Gateshead (loan) | 2021–22 | National League North | 31 | 0 | 2 | 0 | — | | 1 (Note: Appearance(s) in FA Trophy) | 0 | 34 | 0 |
| Reading (loan) | 2025–26 | League One | 14 | 0 | 1 | 0 | 1 | 0 | 0 (Note: Appearance(s) in EFL Trophy) | 0 | 16 | 0 |
| Career total | | | 72 | 1 | 5 | 1 | 1 | 0 | 1 | 0 | 79 | 2 |
