= John Ryan (footballer, born 2004) =

Irish footballer

Personal information
- Full name: John Patrick Ryan
- Date of birth: 20 January 2004 (age 22)
- Place of birth: County Limerick, Ireland
- Position: Left-back

Team information
- Current team: Hampton & Richmond Borough (on loan from Reading)
- Number: 26

Youth career
- Aisling Annacotty
- 2017–2018: St. Kevin's Boys
- 2018–2021: Shamrock Rovers

Senior career*
Years	Team	Apps	(Gls)
2020	Shamrock Rovers II	11	(0)
2022	UCD	20	(0)
2022–2023	Sassuolo	0	(0)
2023–	Reading	0	(0)
2026–	→ Hampton & Richmond Borough (loan)	1	(0)

International career^{‡}
2018–2019	Republic of Ireland U15	9	(0)
2019–2020	Republic of Ireland U16	9	(0)
2021	Republic of Ireland U18	3	(0)
2022–2023	Republic of Ireland U19	4	(0)
- * Club domestic league appearances and goals as of 01:22, 28 October 2026 (UTC) ‡ National team caps and goals as of 21:29, 28 March 2023 (UTC)

John Patrick Ryan (born 20 January 2004) is an Irish professional footballer who plays as a left-back for Hampton & Richmond Borough, on loan from Reading.

== Club career ==
Born in County Limerick, Ryan started his career with local side Aisling Annacotty before a move to St. Kevin's Boys in 2017. He would not stay for long, and after an approach by Shamrock Rovers, he joined the Tallaght-based side in 2018. As a child, he also played Gaelic football and hurling for teams in Ballybricken and Monaleen as well as for the Limerick primary schools Gaelic football team.

After starring for Shamrock Rovers' youth sides, winning a number of competitions, he left for fellow League of Ireland Premier Division side UCD to gain more first-team experience, before securing a move to Italian side Sassuolo in September 2022.

Also on 1 September 2023, Reading announced the singing of Ryan to their U21 squad for the season. On 23 May 2024, Reading announced that they had extended their contract with Ryan for an additional season.

On 11 May 2025, Reading again announced that they had extended their contract with Ryan for an additional year. On 20 October 2026, Ryan joined Hampton & Richmond Borough on loan until the middle of January 2027.

== International career ==
Ryan has represented the Republic of Ireland at youth international level.

== Career statistics ==
As of matches played 24 October 2026

Appearances and goals by club, season and competition
Club	Season	League			National Cup (Note: Includes FAI Cup, Coppa Italia & FA Cup)		League Cup (Note: Includes EFL Cup)		Other		Total	
Club	Season	Division	Apps	Goals	Apps	Goals	Apps	Goals	Apps	Goals	Apps	Goals
Shamrock Rovers II	2020	LOI First Division	11	0	–		–		–		11	0
UCD	2022	LOI Premier Division	20	0	2	0	–		0	0	22	0
Sassuolo	2022–23	Serie A	0	0	0	0	–		–		0	0
Reading	2023–24	EFL League One	0	0	0	0	–		0	0	0	0
Reading	2024–25	EFL League One	0	0	0	0	0	0	0	0	0	0
Reading	2025–26	EFL League One	0	0	0	0	3	0	3 (Note: Appearances in the EFL Trophy)	0	6	0
Reading	2026–27	EFL League One	0	0	0	0	0	0	0	0	0	0
Reading	Total		0	0	0	0	3	0	3	0	6	0
Hampton & Richmond Borough	2026–27	National League South	1	0	0	0	–		–		1	0
Career total			32	0	2	0	3	0	3	0	40	0
