= Geoff Barker =

English footballer (1949–2022)

Personal information
- Full name: Geoffrey Arthur Barker
- Date of birth: 7 February 1949
- Place of birth: Kingston upon Hull, England
- Date of death: 14 February 2022 (aged 73)
- Position: Defender

Senior career*
Years	Team	Apps	(Gls)
1968–1971	Hull City	30	(2)
1970–1971	→ Southend United (loan)	25	(0)
1971–1975	Darlington	151	(6)
1975–1977	Reading	52	(2)
1977–1979	Grimsby Town	66	(1)
Total		324	(11)
- * Club domestic league appearances and goals

Geoffrey Arthur Barker (7 February 1949 – 14 February 2022) was an English footballer who played as a defender in the Football League for Hull City and Southend United, Darlington, Reading and Grimsby Town. Barker died on 14 February 2022, at the age of 73. Barker is the grandfather of current Hull City player Matty Jacob, who also previously played for Reading.
