= Shay Spencer =

English footballer

Personal information
- Full name: Shay Morales Spencer
- Date of birth: 13 October 2005 (age 21)
- Place of birth: England
- Position: Midfielder

Team information
- Current team: Slough Town (on loan from Reading)
- Number: 6

Youth career
- –2024: Reading

Senior career*
Years	Team	Apps	(Gls)
2024–	Reading	1	(0)
2026	→ Wealdstone (loan)	12	(0)
2026–	→ Slough Town (loan)	12	(1)
- * Club domestic league appearances and goals as of 12:03, 9 November 2026 (UTC)

Shay Morales Spencer (born 13 October 2005) is an English professional footballer who plays as a midfielder for Slough Town, on loan from EFL League One club Reading.

== Career ==
On 5 April 2024, Spencer signed his first professional contract with Reading, keeping him at the club until the summer of 2025. On 20 August 2024, Spencer made his debut for Reading, playing 65 minutes before being replaced by Michael Craig in a 3-1 win over West Ham United U21 in the EFL Trophy., Spencer then made his league debut for Reading on 19 October 2024, in a 4-1 victory over Crawley Town, coming on as an 80th-minute substitute for Ben Elliott.

On 2 July 2025, Reading announced that Spencer had signed a new one-year contract with the club.

On 15 January 2026, Reading announced that Spencer had joined National League club Wealdstone on loan for at least the next month. On 12 August 2026, Spencer joined Slough Town on loan until mid-October 2026.

== Career statistics ==
=== Club ===
As of match played 14 November 2026

Appearances and goals by club, season and competition
Club	Season	League			National Cup		League Cup		Continental		Other		Total	
Club	Season	Division	Apps	Goals	Apps	Goals	Apps	Goals	Apps	Goals	Apps	Goals	Apps	Goals
Reading	2024–25	EFL League One	1	0	1	0	0	0	—		3 (Note: Appearances in EFL Trophy)	0	5	0
Reading	2025–26	EFL League One	0	0	0	0	1	0	—		3	0	4	0
Reading	2026–27	EFL League One	0	0	0	0	0	0	—		0	0	0	0
Reading	Total		1	0	1	0	1	0	-	-	6	0	9	0
Wealdstone (loan)	2025–26	National League	12	0	0	0	—		—		1 (Note: Appearances in the FA Trophy)	0	13	0
Slough Town (loan)	2026–27	National League South	12	1	1	0	—		—		1	1	14	2
Career total			25	1	2	0	1	0	-	-	8	1	36	2
