= Kelvin Ehibhatiomhan =

Nigerian footballer

Personal information
- Full name: Kelvin Osemudiamen Ehibhatiomhan
- Date of birth: 23 April 2003 (age 23)
- Place of birth: Benin City, Nigeria
- Height: 1.91 m (6 ft 3 in)
- Position: Forward

Team information
- Current team: Horsens
- Number: 11

Youth career
- –2021: Reading

Senior career*
Years	Team	Apps	(Gls)
2021–2026	Reading	123	(19)
2026–	Horsens	12	(4)
- * Club domestic league appearances and goals as of 13 November 2026 (UTC)

Kelvin Osemudiamen Ehibhatiomhan (born 23 April 2003) is a Nigerian professional footballer who plays as a forward for Danish Superliga club Horsens.

== Club career ==
=== Reading ===
Ehibhatiomhan signed his first professional contract on 2 July 2021 with Reading.

He made his professional debut with the club in a 3–0 EFL Cup loss to Swansea City on 10 August 2021. He made his league debut for Reading on 6 August 2022, coming on as a late substitute for Shane Long in Reading's 2-1 victory over Cardiff City.

Ehibhatiomhan scored his first goal for Reading in an EFL Cup tie against Stevenage on 9 August 2022.

==== 2023-2024 season ====
Having made just eight appearances for Reading in the EFL Championship in the 2022-2023 season, Ehibhatiomhan was a regular in the Reading side in the 2023-2024 season. He made 47 appearances in all competitions, scoring 11 goals.

In February 2024, Reading manager Rubén Sellés praised him for his performances, saying: "He has been exceptional."

On 8 May 2024, Reading activated a one-year extension to Ehibhatiomhan's contract, keeping him at the club until the summer of 2025.

==== 2024-2025 season ====
Ehibhatiomhan was in the starting 11 for Reading's opening EFL League One game of the season at Birmingham City and scored Reading's goal in a 1-1 draw. He was named in football statistics website Whoscored's EFL League One Team of the Week.

Ehibhatiomhan scored again as Reading won 2-0 at home to Wigan Athletic in their second League One game of the season.

He was in the starting line up for all of Reading's first nine League One games.

He was sent off for a second yellow card in Reading's game at Rotherham United on 5 October. After the game, Reading's manager Rubén Sellés said he was "let down" by Ehibhatiomhan, adding: "It is not acceptable".

On 2 November, it was announced that Ehibhatiomhan had suffered a hip injury and was out of action for three months.

==== 2025-2026 season ====
On 24 July 2025, Reading announced that Ehibhatiomhan had signed a new two-year contract with the club, after his previous deal had expired on 30 June 2025.

He scored his first senior hat-trick on 7 March 2026 in a 3-2 win over Luton Town at Kenilworth Road. Having scored another three goals across the month against Burton Albion at the Pirelli Stadium and Wigan Athletic (who he scored a brace against) at the Select Car Leasing Stadium, for which he was named EFL League One Player of the Month for March 2026 whilst deputising for the injured Jack Marriott.

=== Horsens ===
On 29 July 2026, recently promoted Danish Superliga club AC Horsens announced the signing of Ehibhatiomhan from Reading for an undisclosed fee, with Ehibhatiomhan signing a long-term contract.

== Personal life ==
Ehibhatiomhan was born in Benin City, Nigeria but lived his teenage years in England.

His brother, Princewill, is also a professional footballer who currently plays for EFL Championship club Southampton.

== Career statistics ==
As of match played 8 November 2026

Appearances and goals by club, season and competition
Club	Season	League			FA Cup		League Cup		Other		Total	
Club	Season	Division	Apps	Goals	Apps	Goals	Apps	Goals	Apps	Goals	Apps	Goals
Reading	2021–22	Championship	0	0	0	0	1	0	-		1	0
Reading	2022–23	Championship	8	1	0	0	1	1	-		9	2
Reading	2023–24	League One	40	5	2	1	2	3	3 (Note: Appearances in EFL Trophy)	2	47	11
Reading	2024–25	League One	33	4	0	0	1	0	1	0	35	4
Reading	2025–26	League One	42	9	1	0	2	1	2	0	47	10
Reading	Total		123	19	3	1	7	5	6	2	139	27
AC Horsens	2026–27	Danish Superliga	12	4	2	0	-		-		14	4
Total			135	23	5	1	7	5	6	2	153	31

== Honours ==
Individual

- EFL League One Player of the Month: March 2026
