= Reading Chronicle =

English local newspaper

- Type: Weekly newspaper
- Format: Tabloid
- Owner: Newsquest
- Editor: Katie French
- Language: English
- Headquarters: Reading, Berkshire
- Circulation: 2,997 (as of 2024)
- Website: www.readingchronicle.co.uk

The Reading Chronicle is a weekly newspaper covering Reading in Berkshire, UK and surrounding areas, which began its life as the Berkshire Chronicle. It is currently edited by Katie French, serving as group editor for its parent company Newsquest Berkshire & Buckinghamshire.

The paper is published each Thursday with two editions: the Reading Chronicle and the Woodley and Earley Chronicle. The paper switched to a compact, tabloid format from a broadsheet format in March 2009. Its supplements include the weekly entertainment section The Guide and monthly Business Review alongside the Property Chronicle.

It covers an area extending to Goring-on-Thames to the north, Bucklebury to the west, Mortimer to the south, and Twyford and Winnersh to the east.

== Ownership history ==
The paper was owned by Trinity Mirror, now Reach plc, until it was purchased by Berkshire Media Group in 2007. The group's parent company Clyde and Forth Press, based in Scotland, went into receivership in 2012 and was taken over by management to become Romanes Media. This venture, named after Clyde and Forth Press' late owner Deirdre Romanes, was acquired by Newsquest in 2015.

== Awards ==
In November 2021, the Chronicle won the Making A Difference title in the News Media Association's annual Journalism Matters awards, which highlight instances of news outlets having a positive influence on their communities. It was honoured for its Help Save Charlie campaign, which raised thousands of pounds towards private treatment for a young boy suffering from a rare brain tumour.

== Controversy ==
In 2014, the Chronicle published a feature and front-page article alleging that hooliganism was a problem at Reading Football Club. The club's chairman Sir John Madejski suspended its links with the paper and criticised it as "an unwarranted and sensationalised attack which undermines everything our club tries to represent." The piece was also criticised for implying that the Hillsborough disaster was linked to hooliganism. The following week's edition apologised on its front page for both the depiction of Reading FC and the Hillsborough reference.
