= Nigel Howe =

British property developer (born 1958)

- Born: 1958 (age 67–68)
- Occupation: property developer

Nigel Howe (born 7 April 1958) is a British property developer, and former CEO and now property projects manager at Reading Football Club, who compete in EFL League One, the third level of the English football league system.

The majority of Howe's career was in property management before joining John Madejski in 1995 when he took over as chief executive of Reading F.C. Howe led the redevelopment of both the club's Madejski Stadium and its business management, and is also a non-executive director of a number of other businesses in which John Madejski has invested including the BenhamGoodhead Print Group, Sackville Properties and the Ark Group. He is also a non-executive director of the Clearview Traffic Group.

In January 2024, Howe, who had been asked by owner Dai Yongge to oversee the club's sale, said eight parties were interested in buying Reading but any sale would take at least two months to complete.

== Family ==
Howe is the nephew of former England and Arsenal coach Don Howe. His son Teddy Howe made his first appearance for Reading against Birmingham City on 5 May 2019.
