= List of Reading F.C. players (25–99 appearances) =

Reading Football Club, established in 1871, is an association football club based in Reading.

== Key ==
- The list is currently updated to include all players who have joined the club since 1997. Those who joined before that date still need to be added.
- The list is sorted by the year the player joined the club. If more than one player joins in the same year then they are sorted alphabetically.

Player

- Players listed in italics spent their entire career with the club on loan.

Club years

- Counted as the years the player signed for, and left the club.

Appearances

- League and total appearances are both sourced to Soccerbase.

Academy graduate
Current Reading player
Current Reading player and academy graduate
Played for Reading on loan

International career

- Players who made international appearances only have the highest level at which they played listed.
- A player's senior international team is sourced to National Football Teams whilst appearances at age group level are sourced to the Association of Football Statisticians. Players not covered by the above are sourced as needed in the "Refs" column.

== Players with 25 to 99 appearances ==
As of match played 14 November 2026

Name	Years	League apps	League goals	Cup apps	Cup goals	League Cup apps	League Cup goals	EFL Trophy apps	EFL Trophy goals	Other apps (Note: Includes Promotion play-offs)	Other goals	Total apps	Total goals	International Career
Bill Johnstone	1926–1929	78	34			-	-	-	-	-	-	78+	34+	—
John Hunter	1928–1931	86	7			-	-	-	-	-	-	86+	7+	—
Ron Fearon	1980–1983	61	0					-	-	-	-	61+	0+	—
Carl Asaba	1997–1998	33	8	3	1	9	4	-	-	-	-	45	13	—
Lee Hodges	1997–2001	79	9	8	1	10	0	2	0	0	0	99	10	—
Ray Houghton	1997–1999	43	1	4	0	9	0	-	-	-	-	56	1	Republic of Ireland
Steve Mautone	1997–1999	29	0	0	0	5	0	-	-	-	-	34	0	Australia U23
Grant Brebner	1998–1999	41	10	1	0	4	1	0	0	-	-	46	11	Scotland U21
Paul Brayson	1998–2000	41	1	2	0	2	0	2	0	-	-	47	1	England C
Chris Casper	1998–2002	47	0	3	0	4	0	1	0	-	-	55	0	England U21
Jim Crawford	1998–2000	21	1	1	0	4	0	2	0	-	-	28	1	Republic of Ireland U21
Stuart Gray	1998–2001	52	2	2	0	8	0	2	0	0	0	64	2	Scotland U21
Mass Sarr Jr.	1998–2000	31	3	2	0	2	0	3	0	-	-	38	3	Liberia
Sean Evers	1999–2001	18	0	4	0	2	0	3	0	0	0	27	0	—
Peter Grant	1999–2000	29	1	4	0	3	0	2	0	-	-	38	1	Scotland
Andy Gurney	1999–2001	67	3	6	0	5	0	4	0	2	0	84	3	—
Darius Henderson	1999–2004	71	11	3	0	4	2	3	2	2	0	83	15	—
John Mackie	1999–2004	71	3	7	0	4	2	3	0	-	-	85	3	—
Keith Scott	1999–2001	35	5	3	0	3	2	3	1	-	-	44	8	—
Neil Smith	1999–2002	65	3	3	0	5	0	4	1	-	-	77	4	—
Nathan Tyson	1999–2004	33	1	3	0	2	0	1	0	1	0	40	1	England U20
Keith Jones	2000–2002	40	0	4	1	0	0	1	0	-	-	45	1	—
Matthew Robinson	2000–2002	65	0	2	0	4	0	1	0	3	0	75	0	—
Tony Rougier	2000–2003	86	6	3	0	5	0	4	0	1	0	99	6	Trinidad and Tobago
Kevin Watson	2001, 2002–2004	66	2	1	0	2	0	0	0	1	0	70	2	—
Adrian Whitbread	2001–2003	33	0	1	0	3	0	0	0	0	0	37	0	—
Steve Brown	2002–2004	40	1	3	0	2	0	-	-	2	0	47	1	—
Shaun Goater	2003–2005	43	12	2	2	4	1	-	-	-	-	49	15	Bermuda
Dean Morgan	2003–2005	31	3	3	0	1	0	-	-	-	-	35	3	—
Scott Murray	2003–2004	34	5	2	0	4	0	-	-	-	-	40	5	Scotland B
Lloyd Owusu	2003–2005	41	10	3	0	2	0	-	-	-	-	46	10	Ghana
Paul Brooker	2004–2005	42	0	1	0	2	0	-	-	-	-	45	0	—
Simon Cox	2005–2008, 2014–2016	52	9	9	0	8	0	-	-	-	-	69	9	Republic of Ireland
John Oster	2005–2008	76	2	8	0	6	1	-	-	-	-	90	3	Wales
André Bikey	2006–2009	62	6	6	0	4	1	-	-	1	0	73	7	Cameroon
Ulises de la Cruz	2006–2008	15	1	6	0	4	0	-	-	-	-	25	1	Ecuador
Ki-Hyeon Seol	2006–2007	30	4	4	0	0	0	-	-	-	-	34	4	South Korea
Kalifa Cissé	2007–2010	75	7	4	0	3	0	-	-	1	0	83	7	Mali
Michael Duberry	2007–2009	48	0	1	0	3	0	-	-	2	0	54	0	England U21
Liam Rosenior	2007–2010	64	0	2	0	1	0	-	-	2	0	69	0	England U21
Michail Antonio	2008–2012	28	1	2	0	3	0	-	-	0	0	33	1	Jamaica
Chris Armstrong	2008–2011	47	1	0	0	1	0	-	-	-	-	48	1	Scotland B
Marek Matějovský	2008–2010	51	2	1	0	2	0	-	-	2	0	56	2	Czech Republic
Alex McCarthy	2008–2014	70	0	2	0	3	0	-	-	0	0	75	0	England U21
Gylfi Sigurðsson	2008–2010	42	18	6	3	3	1	-	-	-	-	51	22	Iceland
Ryan Bertrand	2009–2010	44	1	6	0	1	0	-	-	-	-	51	1	England U21
Shaun Cummings	2009–2015	77	1	3	0	5	0	-	-	1	0	86	1	Jamaica
Brian Howard	2009–2012	59	2	6	1	3	1	-	-	1	0	69	3	England U20
Matt Mills	2009–2011	61	4	9	1	2	2	-	-	3	1	75	8	England U19
Andy Griffin	2010–2012	63	0	5	0	1	0	-	-	3	0	72	0	England U21
Ian Harte	2010–2013	88	15	6	0	2	0	-	-	3	0	99	15	Republic of Ireland
Michael Hector	2010–2015, 2015-2016	80	4	9	1	4	0	-	-	-	-	93	4	Jamaica
Zurab Khizanishvili	2010, 2010–2011	51	0	2	0	0	0	-	-	3	0	56	0	Georgia
Jake Taylor	2010–2016	31	2	1	0	4	1	-	-	-	-	36	3	Wales
Mathieu Manset	2011–2012	28	5	1	0	1	0	-	-	1	0	31	5	—
Kaspars Gorkšs	2011–2014	81	7	2	0	4	1	-	-	-	-	87	8	Latvia
Sean Morrison	2011–2014	37	4	3	0	4	1	-	-	0	0	44	5	—
Danny Guthrie	2012–2015	62	5	5	0	2	0	-	-	-	-	69	5	England U16
Adrian Mariappa	2012–2013	29	1	2	0	2	0	-	-	-	-	33	1	Jamaica
Jason Roberts	2012–2014	28	6	0	0	1	1	-	-	-	-	29	7	Grenada
Hope Akpan	2013–2015	59	1	1	0	3	0	-	-	-	-	63	1	Nigeria
Jake Cooper	2013–2017	42	4	7	0	5	0	-	-	0	0	54	4	England U19
Stephen Kelly	2013–2015	46	1	6	0	0	0	-	-	-	-	52	1	Republic of Ireland
Anton Ferdinand	2014–2016	21	0	3	0	2	0	-	-	-	-	26	0	England U21
Liam Kelly	2014–2019	82	7	4	0	6	2	-	-	2	0	94	9	Republic of Ireland U21
Jamie Mackie	2014–2015	32	5	5	1	2	0	-	-	-	-	39	6	Scotland
Oliver Norwood	2014–2016	81	4	9	1	2	0	-	-	-	-	92	5	Northern Ireland
Ali Al-Habsi	2015–2017	78	0	6	0	4	0	-	-	3	0	91	0	Oman
Ola John	2015–2016	28	4	4	0	1	0	-	-	-	-	33	4	Netherlands
Lucas Piazon	2015–2016	23	3	3	2	1	0	-	-	-	-	27	5	Brazil U23
Stephen Quinn	2015–2018	34	1	4	0	7	1	-	-	0	0	45	2	Republic of Ireland
Matěj Vydra	2015–2016	31	3	5	6	0	0	-	-	-	-	36	9	Czech Republic
Roy Beerens	2016–2018	57	8	3	0	3	1	-	-	0	0	63	9	Netherlands
George Evans	2016–2018	59	3	3	1	7	1	-	-	3	0	72	4	England U19
Yann Kermorgant	2016–2018	84	23	3	0	2	0	-	-	3	1	92	24	—
Joey van den Berg	2016–2019	61	1	2	0	2	1	-	-	3	0	68	2	—
Anssi Jaakkola	2016–2019	20	0	4	0	6	0	-	-	-	-	30	0	Finland
Callum Harriott	2016–2019	25	2	1	0	4	2	-	-	-	-	30	4	Guyana
Vito Mannone	2017–2020	47	0	0	0	0	0	-	-	-	-	47	0	Italy U21
Tiago Ilori	2017–2019	53	1	4	0	4	0	-	-	3	0	64	1	Portugal U23
Leandro Bacuna	2017–2019	60	4	3	0	4	1	-	-	-	-	66	5	Curaçao
Pelle Clement	2017–2019	23	0	2	0	4	0	-	-	-	-	29	0	Netherlands U21
David Edwards	2017–2019	32	3	3	0	0	0	-	-	-	-	35	3	Wales
Modou Barrow	2017–2020	77	14	3	0	3	0	-	-	-	-	83	14	Gambia
Jón Daði Böðvarsson	2017–2019	53	14	2	3	1	0	-	-	-	-	56	17	Iceland
Sam Baldock	2018–2021	65	10	3	1	6	0	-	-	-	-	74	11	—
Danny Loader	2017–2020	28	1	4	1	3	0	-	-	-	-	35	2	England U20
Matt Miazga	2019, 2019–2020	38	2	3	0	1	0	-	-	-	-	42	2	United States
Rafael Cabral	2019–2022	95	0	2	0	1	1	-	-	-	-	98	0	Brazil
Pelé	2019–2020	31	1	2	0	1	0	-	-	-	-	34	1	Guinea-Bissau
George Pușcaș	2019–2023	84	17	3	2	4	1	-	-	-	-	91	20	Romania
Charlie Adam	2019–2020	21	2	3	0	3	0	-	-	-	-	27	2	Scotland
Michael Olise	2019–2021	67	7	4	0	2	0	-	-	-	-	73	7	France U18
Josh Laurent	2020–2022	86	5	1	0	1	0	-	-	-	-	88	5	—
Alfa Semedo	2020–2021	39	2	1	0	0	0	-	-	-	-	40	2	Guinea-Bissau
Tomás Esteves	2020–2021	29	1	1	0	0	0	-	-	-	-	30	0	Portugal U21
Luke Southwood	2016–2023	26	0	1	0	3	0	-	-	-	-	30	0	England U20
Tom Dele-Bashiru	2021–2022	38	4	1	0	0	0	-	-	-	-	39	4	Nigeria U23
Danny Drinkwater	2021–2022	33	1	1	0	0	0	-	-	-	-	34	4	England
Baba Rahman	2021–2022, 2022–2023	47	0	2	0	0	0	-	-	-	-	49	0	Ghana
Junior Hoilett	2021–2023	61	4	1	0	0	0	-	-	-	-	62	4	Canada
Tom Ince	2022, 2022–2023	53	11	1	0	0	0	-	-	-	-	54	11	England U21
Jeff Hendrick	2022–2023	45	4	1	0	0	0	-	-	-	-	46	4	Republic of Ireland
Andy Carroll	2021–2022, 2022–2023	40	11	2	0	0	0	-	-	-	-	42	11	England
Mamadou Loum	2022–2023	29	1	2	0	1	0	-	-	-	-	32	1	Senegal
Joe Lumley	2022–2023	41	0	1	0	0	0	-	-	-	-	42	0	—
Tyrese Fornah	2022–2023	35	2	1	0	1	0	-	-	-	-	37	2	—
Scott Dann	2021–2023	31	2	1	0	0	0	-	-	-	-	32	0	England U21
Femi Azeez	2019–2024	81	10	4	1	1	0	3	0	-	-	89	11	—
Nesta Guinness-Walker	2022–2024	36	0	1	0	2	0	2	0	-	-	41	0	—
Naby Sarr	2022–2023	24	1	1	0	0	0	-	-	-	-	25	1	France U21
Sam Hutchinson	2022–2024	23	0	2	0	0	0	1	0	-	-	26	0	England U19
Nelson Abbey	2019–2024	25	0	1	0	3	0	2	0	-	-	31	0	England U20
Sam Smith	2016–2021, 2023–2025	67	27	3	0	2	1	2	1	-	-	74	29	—
Michael Craig	2022–2025	60	2	6	0	3	0	7	0	-	-	76	2	Scotland U19
David Button	2023–2025	42	0	3	0	0	0	4	0	-	-	49	0	—
Ben Elliott	2023–2026	64	2	4	0	5	0	4	1	-	-	79	3	Cameroon
Tyler Bindon	2023–2025, 2025	84	4	3	1	2	0	2	0	-	-	91	5	New Zealand
Paul Mukairu	2023–2024	31	3	2	0	0	0	5	3	-	-	38	6	—
Clinton Mola	2023–2024	30	0	1	0	0	0	4	0	-	-	35	0	England U21
Jeriel Dorsett	2019–Present	83	3	5	0	5	0	6	0	-	-	99	3	Montserrat
Kelvin Abrefa	2021–Present	71	0	3	1	4	0	4	1	-	-	83	2	Ghana U20
Mamadi Camará	2020–2026	62	4	5	1	6	2	2	0	-	-	75	7	Guinea-Bissau
Harlee Dean	2023–2025	30	0	3	0	2	0	5	1	-	-	40	1	—
Jayden Wareham	2023–2025	44	5	3	0	1	0	7	2	-	-	55	7	—
Andre Garcia	2024–2026	47	1	2	0	4	1	3	0	-	-	56	2	England U18
Chem Campbell	2024–2025	39	5	2	2	0	0	1	0	-	-	42	7	Wales U17
Tivonge Rushesha	2023–2026	22	0	4	0	5	0	7	0	-	-	38	0	Wales U17
Kamari Doyle	2025–2026	41	4	1	0	3	0	1	0	-	-	46	4	England U20
Daniel Kyerewaa	2025–Present	46	5	2	1	6	0	3	0	-	-	57	6	—
Liam Fraser	2025–Present	38	1	1	0	6	1	3	1	-	-	48	3	Canada
Paddy Lane	2025–Present	46	4	1	0	5	1	2	0	-	-	54	5	Northern Ireland
Finley Burns	2025–2026	32	0	0	0	1	0	0	0	-	-	33	0	England U20
Paudie O'Connor	2025–Present	50	4	1	0	2	1	0	0	-	-	53	5	—
Matt Ritchie	2025–2026	28	1	0	0	0	0	1	0	-	-	29	1	Scotland
Jack Marriott	2025–Present	34	25	1	1	1	0	1	1	-	-	37	27	—
Ashqar Ahmed	2024–Present	14	0	4	0	4	0	8	0	-	-	30	0	—
Randell Williams	2025–Present	30	2	1	0	3	1	2	0	-	-	36	3	—
Haydon Roberts	2026–Present	27	1	1	0	1	0	1	0	-	-	30	1	England U19
