= Andre Garcia (footballer) =

English footballer (born 2007)

Personal information
- Full name: Andre Jacob Garcia
- Date of birth: 30 November 2007 (age 18)
- Place of birth: Aylesbury, England
- Positions: Left-back; winger

Team information
- Current team: Club NXT
- Number: 90

Youth career
- 2011–2024: Reading

Senior career*
Years	Team	Apps	(Gls)
2024–2026	Reading	47	(1)
2026–	Club NXT	10	(0)

International career^{‡}
2025–	England U18	4	(0)
- * Club domestic league appearances and goals as of 25 August 2026 ‡ National team caps and goals as of 22:34, 29 May 2025 (UTC)

Andre Jacob Garcia (born 30 November 2007) is an English professional footballer who plays as a left-back and winger for Belgian Challenger Pro League club Club NXT.

== Club career ==
=== Reading ===
Garcia made his professional debut for Reading on 10 August 2024, coming on as a 73rd-minute substitute for Mamadi Camará, in an opening day of the season 1–1 draw against Birmingham City in EFL League One, becoming the club's 81st Academy graduate in the process.

He scored his first career goal in a 2-1 League Cup win over Portsmouth in August 2025. This was then followed by his first league goal to rescue a draw away at Bolton Wanderers a week later.

=== Club NXT ===
On 1 February 2026, Garcia signed for Belgian Challenger Pro League club Club NXT, the youth academy of Club Brugge, on a three-and-a-half year deal for an undisclosed fee.

== International career ==
On 13 March 2025, Garcia was called up to the England U18 squad for the first time. He made his debut on 20 March 2025 during a 2–2 draw with Czechia.

== Career statistics ==
=== Club ===
As of match played 22 August 2026

Appearances and goals by club, season and competition
Club	Season	League			National Cup		League Cup		Continental		Other		Total	
Club	Season	Division	Apps	Goals	Apps	Goals	Apps	Goals	Apps	Goals	Apps	Goals	Apps	Goals
Reading	2024–25	EFL League One	38	0	1	0	1	0	-		3 (Note: Appearances in EFL Trophy)	0	43	0
Reading	2025–26	EFL League One	9	1	1	0	3	1	-		0	0	13	2
Reading	Total		47	1	2	0	4	1	0	0	3	0	56	2
Club NXT	2025–26	Challenger Pro League	9	0	0	0	0	0	3 (Note: Appearances in UEFA Youth League)	1	0	0	12	1
Club NXT	2026–27	Challenger Pro League	1	0	0	0	0	0	0	0	0	0	1	0
Club NXT	Total		10	0	0	0	0	0	3	1	0	0	13	1
Career total			57	1	2	0	4	1	3	1	1	0	69	3
