= Adrian Akande =

Footballer (born 2003)

Personal information
- Full name: Adrian Moyosoreoluwa Ameerqudus Akande
- Date of birth: 22 October 2003 (age 23)
- Place of birth: Lambeth, England
- Height: 1.76 m (5 ft 9 in)
- Position: Forward

Team information
- Current team: Colchester United
- Number: 23

Youth career
- –2016: Crystal Palace
- 2016–2020: Chelsea
- 2020–2022: Swansea City
- 2022–2024: Reading

Senior career*
Years	Team	Apps	(Gls)
2024–2025	Reading	15	(0)
2025–	Colchester United	7	(0)
2026	→ Braintree Town (loan)	3	(0)
- * Club domestic league appearances and goals as of 19:14, 8 April 2026 (UTC)

Adrian Moyosoreoluwa Ameerqudus Akande (born 22 October 2003) is a professional footballer who plays as a forward for EFL League Two club Colchester United. Born in England, he has opted to play for Nigeria internationally.

== Career ==
=== Reading ===
On 19 August 2022, Reading announced that Akande had joined their U21 set up having previously been part of Swansea City's set up. Following the completion of the 2022–23 season, Akande had a clause in his contract triggered to remain at Reading for the 2023–24 season.

On 23 May 2024, Reading released their retained and released list, with Akande being offered a new contract. On 5 July 2024, Reading announced that they had signed new contracts with Akande.

Akande made his debut for Reading on 13 August 2024, in a 2–2 draw against Colchester United in the EFL Cup. On 24 August 2024, Akande made his league debut for Reading, playing 77minutes in their 3–0 defeat to Wrexham. On 16 May 2025, Reading announced that Akande would leave the club when his contract expired on 30 June 2025.

=== Colchester United ===
On 1 August 2025, the eve of the new season, Akande joined League Two club Colchester United on a two-year deal following a successful trial period.

On 28 February 2026, Akande joined National League side, Braintree Town on a one-month loan deal.

== International career ==
Akande was born in England and is of Nigerian descent. He rejected English youth callups, and instead accepted one to the Nigeria U17s in advance of the 2019 U-17 Africa Cup of Nations.

== Career statistics ==
Appearances and goals by club, season and competition
Club	Season	League			FA Cup		EFL Cup		Other		Total	
Club	Season	Division	Apps	Goals	Apps	Goals	Apps	Goals	Apps	Goals	Apps	Goals
Reading	2024–25	League One	15	0	2	1	1	0	3 (Note: Appearance(s) in EFL Trophy)	0	21	1
Colchester United	2025–26	League Two	7	0	0	0	1	0	1	0	9	0
Braintree Town (loan)	2025–26	National League	3	0	—		—		—		3	0
Career total			25	0	2	1	2	0	4	0	33	1
