= Charlie Savage (footballer) =

Wales international footballer (born 2003)

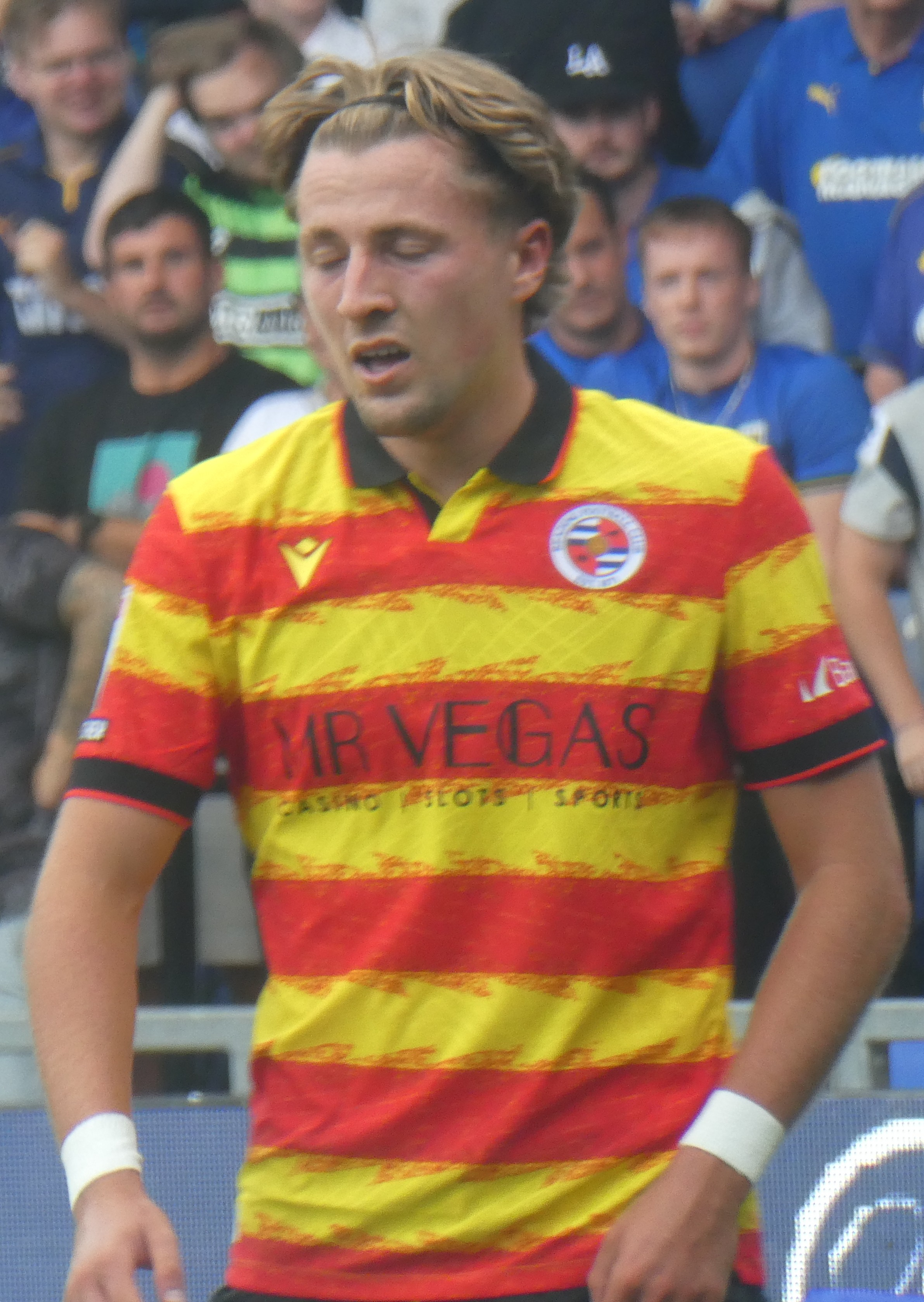
- Savage with Reading in 2026

Personal information
- Full name: Charlie William Henry Savage
- Date of birth: 2 May 2003 (age 23)
- Place of birth: Leicester, England
- Height: 6 ft 0 in (1.82 m)
- Position: Midfielder

Team information
- Current team: Reading
- Number: 8

Youth career
- –2021: Manchester United

Senior career*
Years	Team	Apps	(Gls)
2021–2023	Manchester United	1	(0)
2023	→ Forest Green Rovers (loan)	15	(1)
2023–	Reading	128	(10)

International career^{‡}
2019	Wales U17	3	(0)
2021	Wales U18	1	(0)
2021	Wales U19	5	(1)
2022–2024	Wales U21	8	(0)
2023–	Wales	3	(0)
- * Club domestic league appearances and goals as of 19 April 2026 (UTC) ‡ National team caps and goals as of 22:51, 27 September 2026 (UTC)

Charlie William Henry Savage (born 2 May 2003) is a professional footballer who plays as a midfielder for EFL League One club Reading. Born in England, he plays for the Wales national team.

== Early life ==
Savage was born in Leicester, Leicestershire, and was educated at Manchester Grammar School. He followed in the footsteps of his father, former Wales international footballer Robbie Savage, by joining the youth ranks of Manchester United.

== Club career ==
Savage signed his first professional contract with Manchester United in April 2021. He made his first-team debut for United on 8 December 2021, replacing Juan Mata in the 89th minute of the 2021–22 UEFA Champions League match against Young Boys, while his father, Robbie Savage, was co-commentating on the match for BT Sport. On 22 May 2022, Savage was named in a Premier League matchday squad for the first time, against Crystal Palace.

In January 2023, Savage joined Forest Green Rovers for the remainder of the 2022–23 season, making his debut for the club on 14 February 2023 in a home defeat to Charlton Athletic and scoring his first league goal in a 3–1 defeat by Bristol Rovers on 11 March 2023.

On 22 July 2023, Savage signed for Reading on a four-year contract. He scored his first goal for Reading in a 4–0 win over Millwall in the EFL Cup on 8 August 2023. He then went on to score 12 goals all at the Madejski Stadium in the 2024-25 season against Wigan Athletic, Charlton Athletic, Burton Albion, Northampton Town & Peterborough United. He then scored his first goal of the 2025-26 season at the Madejski Stadium against Stevenage on 6 November 2025, watched on by his dad National League club Forest Green Rovers manager Robbie Savage in the stands in new manager Leam Richardson's first match in charge after replacing former Royals player & manager Noel Hunt.

== International career ==
Savage has represented Wales at under-17, under-18, under-19 and under-21 levels. He was called up to the under-19 team for a friendly tournament in Croatia in September 2021, and scored in a 3–2 defeat to Austria. In September 2022, Savage was called up to the Wales under-21 squad for the first time.

In October 2023, Savage received his first call-up to the Wales senior national team for a friendly match against Gibraltar and an UEFA Euro 2024 qualifier against Croatia. He won his first cap for Wales in the former match, on 11 October, starting in a 4–0 win over Gibraltar.

== Style of play ==
A central midfielder like his father, Robbie Savage, Savage is comfortable both defending and going forward. Despite the similarities, Savage has said that he does not see the likeness, stating that he is more of a technical, ball playing midfielder, rather than a tenacious player like his father was.

== Career statistics ==
=== Club ===
As of match played 19 September 2026

Appearances and goals by club, season and competition
Club	Season	League			FA Cup		EFL Cup		Europe		Other		Total	
Club	Season	Division	Apps	Goals	Apps	Goals	Apps	Goals	Apps	Goals	Apps	Goals	Apps	Goals
Manchester United U21	2021–22	—			—		—		—		3 (Note: Appearances in EFL Trophy)	0	3	0
Manchester United U21	2022–23	—			—		—		—		4	0	4	0
Manchester United U21	Total		—		—		—		—		7	0	7	0
Manchester United	2021–22	Premier League	0	0	0	0	0	0	1 (Note: Appearance in UEFA Champions League)	0	—		1	0
Forest Green Rovers (loan)	2022–23	League One	15	1	—		—		—		—		15	1
Reading	2023–24	League One	40	3	1	0	2	1	—		2	1	45	5
Reading	2024–25	League One	45	5	3	1	1	1	—		2	0	51	7
Reading	2025–26	League One	43	2	1	0	2	0	—		0	0	46	2
Reading	2026–27	League One	6	0	1	1	3	0	—		1	0	10	0
Reading	Total		134	10	5	1	8	2	—		5	1	152	14
Career total			149	11	5	1	8	2	1	0	12	1	175	15

=== International ===
As of match played 27 September 2026

Appearances and goals by national team and year
National team	Year	Apps	Goals
Wales	2023	1	0
Wales	2024	1	0
Wales	2025	0	0
Wales	2026	1	0
Total		3	0

== Honours ==
Individual

- Forest Green Rovers Goal of the Season: 2022–23

== See also ==
- List of Wales international footballers born outside Wales
