= Louie Holzman =

English footballer

Personal information
- Full name: Louie James Holzman
- Date of birth: 16 November 2003 (age 23)
- Place of birth: Windsor, England
- Height: 1.86 m (6 ft 1 in)
- Position: Centre-back

Team information
- Current team: Farnham Town
- Number: 23

Youth career
- –2022: Reading

Senior career*
Years	Team	Apps	(Gls)
2022–2025	Reading	9	(0)
2023	→ Bohemians (loan)	0	(0)
2025–2026	Eastleigh	6	(0)
2025–2026	→ Farnborough (loan)	14	(1)
2026	Farnborough	15	(1)
2026–	Farnham Town	14	(0)
- * Club domestic league appearances and goals as of 14:25, 20 November 2026 (UTC)

Louie James Holzman (born 16 November 2003) is an English professional footballer who plays as a centre-back for National League South club Farnham Town.

== Career ==
Holzman came through Reading's academy, where he was captain of the U23 side. Early in his career, a prolonged injury battle saw him miss nearly 18 months of football. Holzman signed his first professional deal in June 2022 He later made his debut for the Royals on 8 January 2022, in a 2-1 defeat away to Kidderminster Harriers in the FA Cup. On 9 August 2022, he made his second appearance in a League Cup defeat at home to Stevenage In March 2023, Holzman missed a penalty when Reading U23s were eliminated from the Berks & Bucks Cup. He was loaned to League of Ireland team Bohemians during the 2023 season. On 16 May 2025, Reading announced that Holzman would leave the club when his contract expired on 30 June 2025.

On 31 July 2025, Holzman joined National League club Eastleigh. In October 2025, he joined National League South club Farnborough on a short-term loan. He departed Eastleigh by mutual consent in February 2026.

On 14 February 2026, Holzman returned to Farnborough on a permanent basis following his release from Eastleigh.

On 2 August 2026, Holzman joined newly-promoted National League South side, Farnham Town on a one-year deal.

== Personal life ==
Holzman is the maternal grandson of former Reading defender Alan Cooper, and nephew of former Reading defender Jake Cooper. His father and two paternal uncles were in Reading's youth system, with uncle Mark Holzman making 43 appearances for the Royals.

== Career statistics ==
As of match played 14 November 2026

Appearances and goals by club, season and competition
Club	Season	League			National Cup		League Cup		Other		Total	
Club	Season	Division	Apps	Goals	Apps	Goals	Apps	Goals	Apps	Goals	Apps	Goals
Reading	2021–22	Championship	0	0	1	0	0	0	—		1	0
Reading	2022–23	Championship	0	0	0	0	1	0	—		1	0
Reading	2023–24	League One	0	0	0	0	0	0	0	0	0	0
Reading	2024–25	League One	9	0	3	0	0	0	3 (Note: Appearances in the EFL Trophy)	0	15	0
Reading	Total		9	0	4	0	1	0	3	0	17	0
Bohemians (loan)	2023	League of Ireland Premier Division	0	0	2	0	1	0	—		3	0
Eastleigh	2025–26	National League	6	0	0	0	—		0	0	6	0
Farnborough (loan)	2025–26	National League South	14	1	—		—		1 (Note: Appearance in the FA Trophy)	0	15	1
Farnborough	2025–26	National League South	15	1	—		—		—		15	1
Farnham Town	2026–27	National League South	14	0	2	0	—		1	0	17	0
Career total			58	2	8	0	2	0	5	0	73	2
