= 2024–25 Reading F.C. season =

154th season in existence of Reading FC

Reading
2024–25 season
- Owner: Dai Yongge and Dai Xiu Li (until 14 May); Redwood Holdings (from 14 May)
- Manager: Rubén Sellés (until 6 December); Noel Hunt (from 6 December)
- Stadium: Madejski Stadium
- League One: 7th
- FA Cup: Third round vs Burnley
- EFL Cup: First round vs Colchester United
- EFL Trophy: Round of 32 vs Walsall
- Top goalscorer: League: Harvey Knibbs (14); All: Harvey Knibbs (16)
- Highest home attendance: 21,481 (vs Barnsley, 3 May 2025, League One)
- Lowest home attendance: 3,022 (vs West Ham United U21, 20 August 2024, EFL Trophy)
- Average home league attendance: 12,535
- Biggest win: 5–1 (vs. Mansfield Town (A), 21 April 2025, League One)
- Biggest defeat: 0–3 (vs. Wrexham (A), 24 August 2024, League One); 2–5 (vs. Bolton Wanderers (A), 21 September 2024, League One); 1–4 (vs. Stockport County (A), 29 October 2024, League One); 0–3 (vs. Blackpool (H), 14 December 2024, League One)
Home colours	Away colours	Third colours
- All statistics correct as of 3 May 2025.

The 2024–25 season was the 154th season in the history of Reading and their second consecutive season in League One. In addition to the domestic league, the club also participated in the FA Cup, the EFL Cup, and the EFL Trophy.

== Season events ==
=== Pre-season ===
On 8 May 2024, Reading released their retained and release list for the end of the season. Femi Azeez, Kelvin Ehibhatiomhan, Jayden Wareham, Michael Craig, Jeriel Dorsett and Joel Pereira all had one-year optional extensions activated by the club, whilst Kelvin Abrefa and Tivonge Rushesha were offered new contracts with their current deals expiring on 30 June. Reading also confirmed that Matthew Carson, Nesta Guinness-Walker, Sam Hutchinson and Clinton Mola would all be leaving the club when their contracts expire on 30 June.

On 23 May, Reading released their retained and released list for their Under 18 and Under 21 teams. For the Under 21 team, Jacob Hammond-Chambers-Borgnis, John Clarke, Jeremiah Okine-Peters, John Ryan and Charlie Wellens all had one-year contract extensions exercised, Adrian Akande, Matthew Rowley, Jack Senga, Michael Stickland and Basil Tuma had all been offered new contracts, whilst Hamid Abdel-Salam, Billie Clark, Jahmari Clarke, Harvey Collins, Ajani Giscombe, Geneiro Maragh, Harvey Maudner, Sam Paul and Ben Purcell would all leave the club. For the Under 18 team, Joseph Barough, Boyd Beacroft and Harrison Rhone all were offered new contracts, whilst Toby Mawer rejected a contract offer in order to accept a College Sponsorship place in the United States and Tyler Field, Matthew Goulding, William Gutierrez-Ramirez, Jayden Porter-Atkinson, Jack Timberlake and Aaron White would all leave the club.

On 27 June, Reading announced that they had signed a new two-year contract with Kelvin Abrefa.

=== July ===
On 4 July, Reading announced that they had signed a new one-year contract with Tivonge Rushesha after his previous one had expired at the end of the previous season.

On 5 July, Reading announced that they had signed new contracts with Adrian Akande, Matthew Rowley, Jack Senga, Michael Stickland and Basil Tuma, whilst Joseph Barough, Boyd Beacroft, Harrison Rhone, Kiyan Coke-Miles-Smith, Jerae Jones and Emmanuel Osho had all signed their first professional contracts with the club.

On 19 July, Reading announced that Jökull Andrésson had joined Ungmennafélagið Afturelding on loan until 31 October.

=== August ===
On 12 August, Reading announced that Dean Bouzanis had joined Stevenage on loan until January.

On 21 August, Reading announced the departure of Femi Azeez to Millwall for a substantial undisclosed fee.

On 30 August, Reading announced the loan signing of Chem Campbell from Wolverhampton Wanderers until 5 January 2025.

=== October ===
On 25 October, Reading confirmed that Matthew Rowley had joined Tonbridge Angels on a one-month loan deal.

=== November ===
On 4 November, Reading announced that they had mutually agreed to end Jökull Andrésson's contract, that was due to expire in the summer of 2025, early.

On 6 November, Manager Rubén Sellés was nominated for Sky Bet League One Manager of the Month for October.

On 29 November, Reading announced that Matthew Rowley had extended his loan deal with Tonbridge Angels until the end of the season.

=== December ===
On 6 December, Reading announced that Rubén Sellés had left the club to join EFL Championship club Hull City, and that Under-21’s Head Coach Noel Hunt had been appointed as his replacement on a contract until June 2027.

On 19 December, Reading announced that their postponed fixture at home to Shrewsbury Town had been rearranged to 20:00hrs, 11 February 2025.

=== January ===
On 10 January, Reading announced that Chem Campbell had returned to the club on loan for the remainder of the season after his initial loan deal had expired on 5 January.

On 14 January, Reading announced that Harrison Rhone had joined Marlow on loan for one-month.

On 31 January, Sam Smith left the club to sign for Wrexham for a significant undisclosed fee.

=== February ===
On 3 February, Reading announced the loan signing of Billy Bodin from Burton Albion until the end of the season, that Tyler Bindon had been sold to Nottingham Forest for an undisclosed fee whilst also being loaned back to Reading for the remainder of the season, and that Dean Bouzanis had left the club after his contract was ended by mutual agreement.

=== March ===
On 3 March, Reading announced the signing of free-agent Tom Carroll on a contract until the end of the season.

On 12 March, Reading announced that their away fixture at Shrewsbury Town on 22 March, had been rearranged for 8 April at 19:45hrs due to international call-ups.

=== April ===
On 16 April, Tyler Bindon was nominated for the EFL League One Young Player of the Season award alongside Louie Barry and Richard Kone.

=== May ===
Prior to the last match of the season, Reading announced that a sale in principle of the club and its facilities to Rob Couhig's Redwood Holdings Limited. After the match, a 4–2 home defeat to Barnsley, Tyler Bindon was announced as the clubs player of the season with Joel Pereira coming second and Harvey Knibbs third.

On 14 May, Reading and the EFL, confirmed that Redwood Holdings Limited had completed their takeover of the club.

On 16 May, Reading released their retained and released list, with David Button, Harlee Dean, Tom Carroll, Coniah Boyce-Clarke, Adrian Akande, Louie Holzman, Jack Senga, Charlie Wellens, James Sharlott, Kai Source and Verell George all leaving the club at the end of their contracts on 30 June. Reading confirmed that they had activated one-year extension clauses with Mamadi Camará, Tom Norcott, Joseph Barough, Boyd Beacroft and Mathew Rowley. Whilst new contracts had been offered to Michael Craig, Jeriel Dorsett, Kelvin Ehibhatiomhan, Abraham Kanu, Amadou Mbengue, Joel Pereira, Tivonge Rushesha, Michael Stickland, Basil Tuma, Jayden Wareham, Andy Yiadom, Jacob Hammond-Chambers-Borgnis, John Clarke, John Ryan, Jeremiah Okine-Peters, Shay Spencer, Ashqar Ahmed, Carter Bowdery, Philip Duah, Sam Harrison, Luke Howard and Josh Welland.

On 23 May, Reading announced that they had signed a new contract with Lewis Wing, keeping him at the club until the summer of 2028.

=== June ===
On 12 June, Reading announced that they had signed a new contract with Joel Pereira, keeping him at the club until the summer of 2028.

On 23 June, Reading announced that they had signed new one-year contracts with John Clarke and John Ryan.

On 24 June, Reading announced that Michael Stickland had signed a new one-year contract with the club. The following day, 25 June, Reading also announced that Andy Yiadom had signed a new one-year contract.

On 26 June, Reading confirmed that both Amadou Mbengue and Jayden Wareham had turned down new contracts with the club, and would depart at the end of their contracts on 30 June.

== Squad ==
As of match played 3 May 2025

No.	Name	Nationality	Position	Date of birth (age)	Signed from	Signed in	Contract ends	Apps.	Goals
Goalkeepers
1	David Button	(England)	GK	27 February 1989 (aged 36)	Unattached	2023	2025	49	0
22	Joel Pereira (Note: Joel Pereira was born in Switzerland, but qualified to represent Portugal, representing them at youth level between 2012 and 2018.)	(Portugal)	GK	28 June 1996 (aged 28)	Unattached	2023	2028	54	0
31	Coniah Boyce-Clarke (Note: Coniah Boyce-Clarke was born in England, but qualified to represent Jamaica, and made his international debut for Jamaica U20 in June 2022.)	(Jamaica)	GK	1 March 2003 (aged 22)	Academy	2019	2025	7	0
Defenders
2	Kelvin Abrefa (Note: Kelvin Abrefa was born in Italy to Ghanaian parents, going on to make his debut for Ghana U20 in June 2022.)	(Ghana)	DF	9 December 2003 (aged 21)	Academy	2020	2026	56	2
3	Jeriel Dorsett (Note: Jeriel Dorsett was born in Enfield, England, but qualified to represent Montserrat and made his international debut for Montserrat in September 2023. He previously represented England at U18 level.)	(Montserrat)	DF	4 May 2002 (aged 22)	Academy	2018	2025	45	1
6	Harlee Dean	(England)	DF	26 July 1991 (aged 33)	Unattached	2023	2025	40	1
17	Andy Yiadom (Note: Andy Yiadom was born in Holloway, England, but qualified to represent Ghana and made his international debut for Ghana in January 2017. He previously represented England at C level.)	(Ghana)	DF	2 December 1991 (aged 33)	Barnsley	2018	2026	222	4
24	Tyler Bindon	(New Zealand)	DF	27 January 2005 (aged 20)	on loan from Nottingham Forest	2025	2025	91	5
27	Amadou Mbengue (Note: Amadou Mbengue was born in France, but qualified to represent Senegal, going on to make his debut for Senegal U23 in March 2023.)	(Senegal)	DF	5 January 2002 (aged 23)	Unattached	2022	2025	109	3
32	Abraham Kanu	(Sierra Leone)	DF	3 July 2005 (aged 19)	Academy	2021	2025	16	0
49	Emmanuel Osho	(England)	DF	26 September 2006 (aged 18)	Academy	2024	2026	6	0
Midfielders
4	Ben Elliott (Note: Ben Elliott was born in Kingston upon Thames, England, but qualified to represent Cameroon and made his international debut for Cameroon in June 2023. He previously represented England at U15 & U16 level.)	(Cameroon)	MF	5 November 2002 (aged 22)	Chelsea	2023	2026	66	3
5	Michael Craig (Note: Michael Craig was born in Barnet, England, but qualified to represent Scotland, representing them at U16, U17, U19 and U21 level.)	(Scotland)	MF	16 April 2003 (aged 22)	Unattached	2022	2025	76	2
8	Charlie Savage (Note: Charlie Savage was born in Leicester, England, but qualified to represent Wales, representing them at U17, U18, U19, U21 and senior level.)	(Wales)	MF	2 May 2003 (aged 22)	Manchester United	2023	2027	96	12
11	Tom Carroll	(England)	MF	28 May 1992 (aged 32)	Unattached	2025	2025	9	0
14	Tivonge Rushesha	(Zimbabwe)	MF	24 July 2002 (aged 22)	Unattached	2023	2025	33	0
28	Mamadi Camará	(Guinea-Bissau)	MF	31 December 2003 (aged 21)	Feirense	2020	2026	61	5
29	Lewis Wing	(England)	MF	23 June 1995 (aged 29)	Unattached	2023	2028	99	22
30	Andre Garcia	(England)	MF	30 November 2007 (aged 17)	Academy	2024		43	0
Forwards
7	Harvey Knibbs	(England)	FW	26 April 1999 (aged 26)	Unattached	2023	2026	100	32
9	Kelvin Ehibhatiomhan	(Nigeria)	FW	23 April 2002 (aged 23)	Academy	2021	2025	92	17
10	Billy Bodin (Note: Billy Bodin was born in Swindon, England, but qualified to represent Wales, representing them at U17, U19, U21 and senior level.)	(Wales)	FW	24 March 1992 (aged 33)	on loan from Burton Albion	2025	2025	16	2
19	Jayden Wareham	(England)	FW	13 May 2003 (aged 21)	Unattached	2023	2025	55	7
20	Chem Campbell (Note: Chem Campbell was born in Birmingham, England, but qualified to represent Wales, representing them at U17 level.)	(Wales)	FW	30 December 2002 (aged 22)	on loan from Wolverhampton Wanderers	2025	2025	42	7
U21
26	Basil Tuma (Note: Basil Tuma was born in Uganda, but qualified to represent Malta, and made his international debut for Malta U20 in November 2022.)	(Malta)	FW	24 April 2005 (aged 20)	Academy	2021	2025	12	0
33	John Clarke	(Republic of Ireland)	DF	24 April 2004 (aged 21)	Port Vale	2022	2026	4	0
34	Louie Holzman	(England)	DF	16 November 2003 (aged 21)	Academy	2020	2025	17	0
35	Jack Senga	(Belgium)	MF	27 January 2004 (aged 21)	Academy	2020	2025	5	0
37	Adrian Akande	(Nigeria)	FW	22 October 2003 (aged 21)	Unattached	2022	2025	21	1
38	Michael Stickland	(England)	DF	9 November 2003 (aged 21)	Academy	2020	2026	10	0
39	Ashqar Ahmed	(England)	DF	31 August 2007 (aged 17)	Academy	2023		12	0
40	Charlie Wellens	(England)	MF	5 December 2002 (aged 22)	Unattached	2023	2025	3	0
41	Tom Norcott	(England)	GK	3 January 2005 (aged 20)	Academy	2021	2026	2	0
42	Boyd Beacroft	(England)	DF	22 November 2005 (aged 19)	Academy	2021	2026	1	0
43	Jeremiah Okine-Peters	(England)	FW	16 December 2004 (aged 20)	Academy	2021	2025	1	0
44	Tyler Sackey	(England)	MF	14 November 2006 (aged 18)	Academy	2024		4	2
46	Jacob Borgnis	(New Zealand)	MF	6 September 2004 (aged 20)	Academy	2021	2025	0	0
47	Shay Spencer	(England)	MF	13 October 2005 (age 21)	Academy	2022	2025	5	0
50	Joseph Barough	(England)	MF	3 April 2006 (aged 19)	Academy	2023	2026	1	0
52	Sam Harrison	(England)	DF	24 October 2006 (aged 18)		2024	2025	0	0
53	Philip Duah	(Ghana)	DF	13 November 2006 (aged 18)	Academy	2024	2025	0	0
57	John Ryan	(Republic of Ireland)	DF	21 January 2004 (aged 21)	Sassuolo	2023	2026	0	0
	Matthew Rowley	(England)	GK	30 July 2004 (aged 20)	Academy	2020	2026	0	0
	Harrison Rhone	(England)	GK	25 March 2006 (aged 19)	Academy	2021		0	0
	Kiyan Coke-Miles-Smith	(England)	MF	22 November 2005 (aged 18)	Academy	2024	2027	0	0
	Jerae Jones	(England)	MF	22 May 2007 (aged 17)	Academy	2024	2027	0	0
	Maddox McMillan	(England)	MF		Aldershot Town	2024	2025	0	0
U18
	Denim Nnamudi	(England)	MF	7 July 2006 (aged 18)	Academy	2023		0	0
Out on loan
Left during the season
10	Sam Smith	(England)	FW	8 March 1998 (aged 27)	Unattached	2023	2026	74	29
11	Femi Azeez (Note: Azeez was born in Westminster, England, but qualified to represent Nigeria and made his international debut for Nigeria in May 2026.)	(England)	FW	5 June 2001 (aged 23)	Wealdstone	2019	2025	89	11
25	Jökull Andrésson	(Iceland)	GK	25 August 2001 (aged 23)	Academy	2018	2025	0	0
	Dean Bouzanis	(Australia)	GK	2 October 1990 (aged 34)	Sutton United	2022	2025	9	0

== Transfers ==
For those players sold, released or contract ended before the start of this season, see 2023–24 Reading F.C. season.

=== In ===
Date	Position	Nationality	Name	From	Fee	Ref.
3 March 2025	MF	(England)	Tom Carroll	Unattached	Free	

=== Loans in ===
Start date	Position	Nationality	Name	From	End date	Ref.
30 August 2024	FW	(Wales)	Chem Campbell	Wolverhampton Wanderers	5 January 2025	
10 January 2025	FW	(Wales)	Chem Campbell	Wolverhampton Wanderers	End of season	
3 February 2025	FW	(Wales)	Billy Bodin	Burton Albion	End of season	
3 February 2025	DF	(New Zealand)	Tyler Bindon	Nottingham Forest	End of season	

=== Out ===
Date	Position	Nationality	Name	To	Fee	Ref.
21 August 2024	FW	(England)	Femi Azeez	Millwall	Undisclosed	
31 January 2025	FW	(England)	Sam Smith	Wrexham	Undisclosed	
3 February 2025	DF	(New Zealand)	Tyler Bindon	Nottingham Forest	Undisclosed	

=== Loans out ===
Start date	Position	Nationality	Name	To	End date	Ref.
19 July 2024	GK	(Iceland)	Jökull Andrésson	Ungmennafélagið Afturelding	31 October 2024	
12 August 2024	GK	(Australia)	Dean Bouzanis	Stevenage	January 2025	
25 October 2024	GK	(England)	Matthew Rowley	Tonbridge Angels	End of season (Note: On 29 November, Rowley's loan at Tonbridge was extended until the end of season.)	
14 January 2025	GK	(England)	Harrison Rhone	Marlow	14 February 2025	

=== Released ===
Date	Position	Nationality	Name	Joined	Date	Ref
4 November 2024	GK	(Iceland)	Jökull Andrésson	Afturelding	7 December 2024	
3 February 2025	GK	(Australia)	Dean Bouzanis	Charlton Athletic	22 March 2025	
30 June 2025	GK	(England)	David Button	Ipswich Town	4 July 2025	
30 June 2025	GK	(England)	James Sharlott	Salisbury	4 August 2025	
30 June 2025	GK	(Jamaica)	Coniah Boyce-Clarke	Aldershot Town	25 November 2025	
30 June 2025	DF	(England)	Harlee Dean	Morecambe	20 January 2026	
30 June 2025	DF	(England)	Louie Holzman	Eastleigh	31 July 2025	
30 June 2025	DF	(England)	Kai Source	Luton Town	16 September 2025	
30 June 2025	DF	(Senegal)	Amadou Mbengue	Queens Park Rangers	1 July 2025	
30 June 2025	MF	(Belgium)	Jack Senga	Sarajevo B	15 August 2025	
30 June 2025	MF	(England)	Tom Carroll			
30 June 2025	MF	(England)	Maddox McMillan	Aldershot Town	14 August 2026	
30 June 2025	MF	(England)	Charlie Wellens	Leyton Orient	12 August 2025	
30 June 2025	MF	(Scotland)	Michael Craig	Leyton Orient	4 July 2025	
30 June 2025	FW	(England)	Verell George	Slough Town		
30 June 2025	FW	(England)	Jayden Wareham	Exeter City	1 July 2025	
30 June 2025	FW	(Nigeria)	Adrian Akande	Colchester United	1 August 205	
30 June 2024	FW	(Nigeria)	Kelvin Ehibhatiomhan	New Contract	24 July 2025	

== Friendlies ==
On 22 May, Reading announced their first pre-season friendly, against Watford behind closed doors. A day later, the first open to public friendly was confirmed, against Queens Park Rangers. On 7 June, a trip to face Woking was confirmed. A fourth pre-season fixture was later added, at home to Hull City. On 21 June, Reading announced that they would travel to the Cardiff City Stadium on 31 July to face Cardiff City.

6 July 2024	Watford	0–2	Reading	St Albans
11:00 BST (UTC+1)		Report	Akande 64'; Wareham 72'	Stadium: Watford Football Club Training Ground; Attendance: 0 (behind closed doors)

19 July 2024	Reading	1–2	Millwall	Wokingham
12:00 BST (UTC+1)	Ehibhatiomhan 51'	Report	Esse 24'; Flemming 86'	Stadium: Bearwood Park; Attendance: 0 (behind closed doors)

23 July 2024	Woking	0–2	Reading	Woking
19:30 BST (UTC+1)		Report	Wareham 59'; Ehibhatiomhan 75' (pen.)	Stadium: Kingfield Stadium; Attendance: 2,635

27 July 2024	Reading	1–0	Queens Park Rangers	Reading
15:00 BST (UTC+1)	Azeez 47'	Report		Stadium: Madejski Stadium; Attendance: 4,332

31 July 2024	Cardiff City	2–1	Reading	Cardiff
19:30 BST (UTC+1)	Robinson 4', 79'	Report	Azeez 12'	Stadium: Cardiff City Stadium; Attendance: 3,077

3 August 2024	Reading	2–0	Hull City	Reading
15:00 BST	Elliott 35'; Smith 53'	Report		Stadium: Madejski Stadium; Attendance: 2,368

=== Development ===
Didcot Town announced, on 24 May, a friendly against a Reading development side.

13 July 2024	Reading U21s	0–2	Hemel Hempstead Town	Wokingham
11:00 BST (UTC+1)		Report	57' (o.g.); Iaciofano 68'	Stadium: Bearwood Park; Attendance: 0 (Behind closed doors)

27 July 2024	Didcot Town	0–7	Reading U21s	Didcot
14:00 BST (UTC+1)		Report	Trialist A 8'; Trialist B 12'; Tuma 28'; Sackey 49', 58', 65'; George 55'	Stadium: Loop Meadow

30 July 2024	Reading U21s	1–0	Millwall	Wokingham
12:00 BST (UTC+1)	72' (o.g.)			Stadium: Bearwood Park

== Competitions ==
=== Overall record ===
Competition	First match	Last match	Starting round	Final position	Record							
Competition	First match	Last match	Starting round	Final position	Pld	W	D	L	GF	GA	GD	Win %
League One	10 August 2024	3 May 2025	Matchday 1	7th	46	21	12	13	68	57	+11	45.65
FA Cup	2 November 2024	11 January 2025	First round	Third round	3	2	0	1	8	6	+2	66.67
EFL Cup	13 August 2024	13 August 2024	First round	First round	1	0	1	0	2	2	+0	0.00
EFL Trophy	20 August 2024	10 December 2024	Group stage	Round of 32	4	2	1	1	7	3	+4	50.00
Total					54	25	14	15	85	68	+17	46.30

Last updated: 3 May 2025
Source: Soccerway

=== League One ===
It was announced by the EFL the season would begin on the weekend of the 10 and 11 August 2024 and conclude on 3 May 2025. Fixtures would be announced on the 26 June 2024. On 26 June the schedule for the season was released, with Reading starting their season with an away trip to Birmingham City on 10 August, to be shown on Sky Sports.

==== League table ====
Pos	Team	Pld	W	D	L	GF	GA	GD	Pts	Promotion, qualification or relegation
5	Wycombe Wanderers	46	24	12	10	70	45	+25	84	Qualification for League One play-offs
6	Leyton Orient	46	24	6	16	72	48	+24	78	Qualification for League One play-offs
7	Reading	46	21	12	13	68	57	+11	75	
8	Bolton Wanderers	46	20	8	18	67	70	−3	68	
9	Blackpool	46	17	16	13	72	60	+12	67	

Source: EFL Official Website
Rules for classification: 1) Points; 2) Goal difference; 3) Number of goals scored; 4) Head-to-head results; 5) Wins; 6) Away goals; 7) Penalty points (sec 9.5); 8) 12-point sending off offences

==== Results summary ====
Overall								Home						Away					
Pld	W	D	L	GF	GA	GD	Pts	W	D	L	GF	GA	GD	W	D	L	GF	GA	GD
46	21	12	13	68	57	+11	75	14	4	5	37	21	+16	7	8	8	31	36	−5

Last updated: 3 May 2025.
Source: Soccerway

==== Results by round ====
Round	1	2	3	4	6	7	8	9	10	12	13	14	5^{1}	15	17	11^{2}	18	19	20	21	22	23	24	25	27	28	29	30	31	16^{3}	32	33	34	35	36	26^{4}	37	39	40	41	38^{5}	42	43	44	45	46
Ground	A	H	A	H	H	A	H	H	A	H	A	H	A	A	A	A	H	A	H	A	H	H	A	A	H	A	A	H	A	H	H	H	A	H	A	H	H	H	A	H	A	A	H	A	A	H
Result	D	W	L	W	L	L	W	W	L	W	W	W	L	D	W	D	W	D	L	L	W	W	W	D	L	L	L	W	D	D	W	D	W	D	D	W	D	W	L	W	W	D	L	W	W	L
Position	12	5	12	8	13	16	15	12	16	13	7	6	9	9	8	7	6	6	6	7	6	6	5	6	7	8	10	8	8	9	9	9	8	8	8	8	8	6	7	7	6	6	7	7	7	7

Updated to match(es) played on 3 May 2025. Source: Soccerway
A = Away; H = Home; W = Win; D = Draw; L = Loss; P = Postponed
Notes:
- ^{1} Matchday 5 (vs Stockport County) was postponed due to the international call-ups.
- ^{2} Matchday 11 (vs Barnsley) was postponed due to the international call-ups.
- ^{3} Matchday 16 (vs Shrewsbury Town) was postponed due to the international call-ups.
- ^{4} Matchday 26 (vs Wrexham) was postponed due to both Reading and Wrexham participating in the Third Round of the FA Cup.
- ^{5} Matchday 38 (vs Shrewsbury Town) was postponed due to the international call-ups.

==== Matches ====
10 August 2024 1	Birmingham City	1–1	Reading	Birmingham
17:30 BST (UTC+1)	May 87' (pen.)	Report	Wing (yellow card) 23'; Ehibhatiomhan 42'	Stadium: St Andrew's; Attendance: 27,985; Referee: Will Finnie
Note: Live on Sky Sports.

17 August 2024 2	Reading	2–0	Wigan Athletic	Reading
15:00 BST (UTC+1)	Savage 7'; Ehibhatiomhan 57'	Report	Kerr (yellow card) 40'; Aimson (yellow card) 71'; Sze (yellow card) 74'	Stadium: Madejski Stadium; Attendance: 12,689; Referee: Josh Smith

24 August 2024 3	Wrexham	3–0	Reading	Wrexham
15:00 BST (UTC+1)	Palmer 23'; Lee 33'; Cannon 49'	Report	Smith (yellow card) 28'; Elliott (yellow card) 56'	Stadium: Racecourse Ground; Attendance: 13,214; Referee: Ross Joyce

31 August 2024 4	Reading	2–0	Charlton Athletic	Reading
15:00 BST (UTC+1)	Mbengue (yellow card) 34'; Savage 66'; Smith 76' (yellow card) 77'; Dean (yellow card) 85'; Abrefa (yellow card) 90+6'	Report	Berry (yellow card) 20'; Godden (yellow card) 76'; Jones (yellow card) 88'	Stadium: Madejski Stadium; Attendance: 14,778; Referee: Thomas Kirk

14 September 2024 6	Reading	0–1	Leyton Orient	Reading
15:00 BST (UTC+1)		Report	James (yellow card) 9'; Kelman 27'; Galbraith (yellow card) 42'; Hemming (yellow card) 45+2'; Happe (yellow card) 48'; O'Neill (yellow card) 65'; Ball (yellow card) 90+6'	Stadium: Madejski Stadium; Attendance: 12,952; Referee: Declan Bourne

21 September 2024 7	Bolton Wanderers	5–2	Reading	Horwich
15:00 BST (UTC+1)	Sheehan 12'; Santos (yellow card) 16'; Charles 21' (pen.), 34', 45+5' (pen.); Baxter (yellow card) 81'; Dempsey 87'; Williams (yellow card) 88'; Arfield (yellow card) 90+1'	Report	Wing (yellow card) 11'; Elliott 41'; Smith 57' (pen.); Knibbs (yellow card) 71'	Stadium: Toughsheet Community Stadium; Attendance: 19,635; Referee: Sebastian Stockbridge

28 September 2024 8	Reading	2–1	Huddersfield Town	Reading
12:30 BST (UTC+1)	Elliott (yellow card) 30', (goal) 57'; Knibbs 30'	Report	Pearson 21'; Spencer (yellow card) 22'; Headley (yellow card) 49'; Kasumu (yellow card) 62'	Stadium: Madejski Stadium; Attendance: 11,181; Referee: Scott Oldham
Note: Fixture was initially scheduled for a 15:00 kick-off, but was moved for live Sky Sports broadcast.

1 October 2024 9	Reading	3–1	Burton Albion	Reading
20:00 BST (UTC+1)	Campbell 23', 42'; Ehibhatiomhan (yellow card) 50'; Smith 82'; Savage (yellow card) 85'	Report	Williams (yellow card) 41'; Watt (yellow card) 81'; Orsi 84'	Stadium: Madejski Stadium; Attendance: 8,774; Referee: Alex Chilowicz
Note: Live on Sky Sports+

5 October 2024 10	Rotherham United	2–1	Reading	Rotherham
15:00 BST (UTC+1)	Nombe 49' (yellow card) 90+2'; Odoffin 56'; James (yellow card) 61'; Dawson (yellow card) 77'	Report	Wing 26'; Garcia (yellow card) 44'; Ehibhatiomhan (yellow card) 47' (yellow-red card) 68'; Smith (yellow card) 57'; Craig (yellow card) 83'	Stadium: New York Stadium; Attendance: 8,907; Referee: Ben Toner

19 October 2024 12	Reading	4–1	Crawley Town	Reading
12:30 BST (UTC+1)	Mbengue 20' (yellow card) 78'; Wing 40'; Savage 65'; Smith 73'	Report	Forster 30'; Anderson (yellow card) 36'; Camará (yellow card) 87'	Stadium: Madejski Stadium; Attendance: 13,243; Referee: Edward Duckworth
Note: Fixture was initially scheduled for a 15:00 kick-off, but was moved for live Sky Sports broadcast.

22 October 2024 13	Exeter City	1–2	Reading	Exeter
19:45 BST (UTC+1)	Woods (yellow card) 56'; Niskanen 58'	Report	Wareham 1'; Craig 36'; Mbengue (yellow card) 77'	Stadium: St James Park; Attendance: 6,807; Referee: Sam Purkiss
Note: Live on Sky Sports+

26 October 2024 14	Reading	1–0	Bristol Rovers	Reading
12:30 BST (UTC+1)	Smith 66'; Bindon (yellow card) 74'	Report	Omochere (yellow card) 20'; Forde (yellow card) 32' (yellow-red card) 55'; Hunt (yellow card) 88'; Moore (yellow card) 90+2'	Stadium: Madejski Stadium; Attendance: 12,843; Referee: Simon Mather
Note: Fixture was initially scheduled for a 15:00 kick-off, but was moved for live Sky Sports broadcast.

29 October 2024 5	Stockport County	4–1	Reading	Edgeley
19:45 GMT (UTC)	Collar 18'; Wootton 33'; Barry 42' (pen.), 68'; Touray (yellow card) 52'	Report	Campbell 30'; Wing (yellow card) 74'	Stadium: Edgeley Park; Attendance: 8,128; Referee: Thomas Parsons
Note: Live on Sky Sports+. Match originally scheduled for 7 September, but post postponed on 20 August due to international call-ups.

9 November 2024 15	Stevenage	1–1	Reading	Stevenage
15:00 GMT (UTC)	Kemp 29'	Report	Elliott (yellow card) 65'; Knibbs 82'	Stadium: Broadhall Way; Attendance: 4,562; Referee: Craig Hicks

23 November 2024 17	Peterborough United	1–2	Reading	Peterborough
15:00 GMT (UTC)	Fernandez 90+6', (yellow card) 90+6'	Report	Knibbs 9', 23'; Bindon (yellow card) 45+2'; Mbengue (yellow card) 48'	Stadium: London Road Stadium; Attendance: 10,008; Referee: Scott Simpson

26 November 2024 11	Barnsley	2–2	Reading	Barnsley
19:45 GMT (UTC)	Keillor-Dunn 7'; Phillips (yellow card) 49'; Earl 72'	Report	Smith 50', 67'	Stadium: Oakwell; Attendance: 10,011; Referee: Zac Kennard-Kettle
Note: Live on Sky Sports+. Match originally scheduled for 12 October, but post postponed on 30 September due to international call-ups.

3 December 2024 18	Reading	3–0	Cambridge United	Reading
20:00 GMT (UTC)	Camará (yellow card) 9' (goal) 60'; Wing 49', 63'; Elliott (yellow card) 56'	Report	Cousins (yellow card) 54'	Stadium: Madejski Stadium; Attendance: 8,333; Referee: Sam Allison
Note: Live on Sky Sports+

7 December 2024 19	Wycombe Wanderers	1–1	Reading	High Wycombe
15:00 GMT (UTC)	Lubala 18' (yellow card) 62'; Onyedinma (yellow card) 45+2'; Bakinson (yellow card) 74'; Harvie (yellow card) 90+6'	Report	Knibbs 30'; Pereira (yellow card) 58'; Smith (yellow card) 65'	Stadium: Adams Park; Attendance: 7,651; Referee: David Rock

14 December 2024 20	Reading	0–3	Blackpool	Reading
15:00 GMT (UTC)	Mbengue (yellow card) 44'; Smith (yellow card) 55'; Garcia (yellow card) 58'	Report	Morgan 24'; Apter 37'; Fletcher 72'	Stadium: Madejski Stadium; Attendance: 14,455; Referee: Anthony Backhouse

21 December 2024 21	Lincoln City	2–0	Reading	Lincoln
12:30 GMT (UTC)	Cadamarteri 8'; House (yellow card) 55'; Hackett 73'; O'Connor (yellow card) 78'	Report	Holzman (yellow card) 37' (yellow-red card); Dean (yellow card) 55'	Stadium: Sincil Bank; Attendance: 9,396; Referee: Adam Herczeg
Note: Fixture was initially scheduled for a 15:00 kick-off, but was moved for live Sky Sports broadcast.

26 December 2024 22	Reading	4–1	Northampton Town	Reading
15:00 GMT (UTC)	Knibbs 5'; Smith 28'; Savage 75'; Camará 87'	Report	Eaves (yellow card) 45' (goal) 81'; McGeehan (yellow card) 90+3'	Stadium: Madejski Stadium; Attendance: 12,283; Referee: Scott Simpson
Note: Live on Sky Sports+

29 December 2024 23	Reading	2–1	Mansfield Town	Reading
15:00 GMT (UTC)	Camará 17'; Bindon 55'; Mbengue (yellow card) 78'; Wareham (yellow card) 90+2'	Report	Evans 45' (yellow card) 54'; McLaughlin (yellow card) 83'	Stadium: Madejski Stadium; Attendance: 13,626; Referee: Martin Woods
Note: Live on Sky Sports+

1 January 2025 24	Cambridge United	1–3	Reading	Cambridge
15:00 GMT (UTC)	Kachunga 48'; Brophy (yellow card) 71'	Report	Knibbs 40', 53'; Holzman (yellow card) 81'; Smith 83'; Wing (yellow card) 90+3'	Stadium: Abbey Stadium; Attendance: 6,878; Referee: Jacob Miles
Note: Live on Sky Sports+

4 January 2025 25	Charlton Athletic	0–0	Reading	Charlton
15:00 GMT (UTC)		Report	Mbengue (yellow card) 45'; Ahmed (yellow card) 79'	Stadium: The Valley; Attendance: 15,526; Referee: Scott Oldham
Note: Live on Sky Sports+

18 January 2025 27	Reading	1–3	Stockport County	Reading
15:00 GMT (UTC)	Garcia (yellow card) 45+1'; Savage (yellow card) 48'; Smith 61' (yellow card) 88'	Report	Southam-Hales 5'; Connolly 13' (yellow card) 57'; Pye (yellow card) 45+1'; Diamond 68'	Stadium: Madejski Stadium; Attendance: 11,019; Referee: Carl Brook

25 January 2025 28	Leyton Orient	2–0	Reading	Leyton
15:00 GMT (UTC)	Markanday 29'; Kelman 51' (yellow card) 84'; Donley (yellow card) 79'	Report	Craig (yellow card) 34'; Smith (yellow card) 43'	Stadium: Brisbane Road; Attendance: 8,774; Referee: Elliot Bell

28 January 2025 29	Burton Albion	3–2	Reading	Burton upon Trent
19:45 GMT (UTC)	Burrell 10', 90+2'; Böðvarsson 29'	Report	Ehibhatiomhan (yellow card) 36'; Garcia (yellow card) 44'; Craig 69'; Smith 71'	Stadium: Pirelli Stadium; Attendance: 2,358; Referee: Will Finnie

1 February 2025 30	Reading	1–0	Bolton Wanderers	Reading
15:00 GMT (UTC)	Craig (yellow card) 81'; Knibbs 89' (pen.)	Report	Thomason (yellow card) 74'; Southwood (yellow card) 89'; Toal (yellow card) 90+7'	Stadium: Madejski Stadium; Attendance: 11,508; Referee: Anthony Backhouse

8 February 2025 31	Huddersfield Town	0–0	Reading	Huddersfield
15:00 GMT (UTC)	Spencer (yellow card) 53'; Kasumu (yellow card) 87'	Report	Knibbs (yellow card) 60'; Campbell (yellow card) 69'; Ehibhatiomhan (yellow card) 81'	Stadium: Kirklees Stadium; Attendance: 18,385; Referee: Scott Tallis

11 February 2025 16	Reading	1–1	Shrewsbury Town	Reading
20:00 GMT (UTC)	Campbell (yellow card) 16'; Wareham 28'	Report	Perry (yellow card) 51' (goal) 56'	Stadium: Madejski Stadium; Attendance: 7,975; Referee: Abigail Byrne
Note: Match originally scheduled for 16 November, but postponed on 7 November due to international call-ups.

15 February 2025 32	Reading	2–1	Rotherham United	Reading
15:00 GMT (UTC)	Knibbs 24', 90+4' (pen.), (yellow card) 90+5'	Report	Humphreys (yellow card) 17'; James (yellow card) 35'; Nombe 57' (pen.)	Stadium: Madejski Stadium; Attendance: 10,034; Referee: Thomas Parsons

22 February 2025 33	Reading	0–0	Birmingham City	Reading
12:30 GMT (UTC)	Savage (yellow card) 45+3'	Report	Paik (yellow card) 23'	Stadium: Madejski Stadium; Attendance: 13,919; Referee: Alex Chilowicz

1 March 2025 34	Wigan Athletic	1–2	Reading	Wigan
15:00 GMT (UTC)	Kerr 59'	Report	Wareham 71'; Yiadom (yellow card) 75'; Bindon 85'	Stadium: Brick Community Stadium; Attendance: 9,402; Referee: Ollie Yates

4 March 2025 35	Reading	0–0	Exeter City	Reading
20:00 GMT (UTC)		Report	Magennis (yellow card) 41'; Purrington (yellow card) 52'; Watts (yellow card) 53'; Aitchison (yellow card) 57'; A.MacDonald (yellow card) 90+8'	Stadium: Madejski Stadium; Attendance: 7,955; Referee: Richard Eley

8 March 2025 36	Crawley Town	1–1	Reading	Crawley
12:30 GMT (UTC)	Watson (yellow card) 43'; Radcliffe (yellow card) 64'; Ibrahim (yellow card) 86'; Camará 90'	Report	Ehibhatiomhan 29'; Campbell (yellow card) 87'	Stadium: Broadfield Stadium; Attendance: 4,526; Referee: Charles Breakspear
Note: Fixture was initially scheduled for a 15:00 kick-off, but was moved for live Sky Sports broadcasting.

11 March 2025 26	Reading	2–0	Wrexham	Reading
20:00 GMT (UTC)	Stickland (yellow card) 48' (yellow-red card) 75'; Knibbs 51' (pen.); Wing 55'; Pereira (yellow card) 68'; Savage (yellow card) 90+6'	Report		Stadium: Madejski Stadium; Attendance: 11,557; Referee: Edward Duckworth
Note: Match originally scheduled for 11 January, but post postponed on 2 December due to both Reading and Wrexham participating in the Third Round of the FA Cup that same weekend, and was later rearranged for 11 March.

15 March 2025 37	Reading	1–1	Stevenage	Reading
15:00 GMT (UTC)	Piergianni 49' (o.g.); Wing (yellow card) 59'; Savage (yellow card) 78'	Report	Piergianni 60'	Stadium: Madejski Stadium; Attendance: 13,984; Referee: Lee Swabey

29 March 2025 39	Reading	3–1	Peterborough United	Reading
15:00 GMT (UTC)	Hughes 7' (o.g.); Knibbs 58'; Savage 63'; Carroll (yellow card) 90+6'	Report	Edun (yellow card) 43'; Odoh (yellow card) 44'; Poku 66'; Hayes (yellow card) 76'	Stadium: Madejski Stadium; Attendance: 12,108; Referee: Adam Herczeg

1 April 2025 40	Blackpool	3–0	Reading	Blackpool
19:45 BST (UTC+1)	Carey 53', 90+4'; Casey 55'; Hamilton (yellow card) 80'	Report		Stadium: Bloomfield Road; Attendance: 8,345; Referee: Aaron Bannister

5 April 2025 41	Reading	1–0	Wycombe Wanderers	Reading
12:30 BST (UTC+1)	Mbengue (yellow card) 33'; Knibbs (yellow card) 36' (goal) 77' (pen.); Wareham (yellow card) 90+3'	Report	Simons (yellow card) 33'; Kone (yellow card) 36'; Lowry (yellow card) 89'; Grimmer (yellow card) 90+7'	Stadium: Madejski Stadium; Attendance: 15,228; Referee: Thomas Kirk

8 April 2025 38	Shrewsbury Town	1–3	Reading	Shrewsbury
19:45 BST (UTC+1)	Perry 48'; Pierre (yellow card) 57'	Report	Bindon (yellow card) 21'; Wing 34'; Camará (yellow card) 39'; Savage (yellow card) 44'; Ehibhatiomhan 53'; Campbell 72'	Stadium: New Meadow; Attendance: 4,956; Referee: Darren Drysdale
Note: Match originally scheduled for 22 March, but postponed on 12 March due to international call-ups.

12 April 2025 42	Northampton Town	0–0	Reading	Northampton
15:00 BST (UTC+1)	Guinness-Walker (yellow card) 20' (yellow-red card) 77'	Report		Stadium: Sixfields Stadium; Attendance: 7,614; Referee: Greg Rollason

18 April 2025 43	Reading	0–1	Lincoln City	Reading
15:00 BST (UTC+1)	Mbengue (yellow card) 41'; Ehibhatiomhan (yellow card) 59'; Camará (yellow card) 64'; Yiadom (yellow card) 72'	Report	Bayliss (yellow card) 22'; Collins 65'; House (yellow card) 78'; Hamilton (yellow card) 87'; Darikwa (yellow card) 90+6'	Stadium: Madejski Stadium; Attendance: 16,388; Referee: Ben Speedie

21 April 2025 44	Mansfield Town	1–5	Reading	Mansfield
15:00 BST (UTC+1)	Baccus 62' (yellow card) 82'	Report	Wareham 35', 74'; Williams 49' (o.g.); Wing 58'; Garcia (yellow card) 66'; Bodin 90+5'	Stadium: Field Mill; Attendance: 8,377; Referee: Ross Joyce

26 April 2025 45	Bristol Rovers	0–2	Reading	Bristol
12:30 BST (UTC+1)	Sotiriou (yellow card) 90'	Report	Mbengue (yellow card) 59'; Wing 67'; Campbell 90+4'	Stadium: Memorial Stadium; Attendance: 9,035; Referee: Simon Mather

3 May 2025 46	Reading	2–4	Barnsley	Reading
15:00 BST (UTC+1)	Yiadom (yellow card) 60'; Wing 67'; Bodin 90+4'	Report	Humphrys 52'; Russell 57' (yellow card) 76'; Connell (yellow card) 76'; Keillor-Dunn 79', 85'	Stadium: Madejski Stadium; Attendance: 21,481; Referee: Carl Brook

=== FA Cup ===
On 14 October, the draw for the first round was made, with Reading being drawn at home to Fleetwood Town. On 3 November, Reading were drawn at home against 7th tier side Harborough Town. On 2 December, they were drawn at home against Burnley.

2 November 2024 First Round	Reading	2–0	Fleetwood Town	Reading
15:00 GMT (UTC)	Rushesha (yellow card) 6'; Bindon 48'; Odubeko 86' (o.g.)	Report		Stadium: Madejski Stadium; Attendance: 3,685; Referee: Paul Howard

1 December 2024 Second Round	Reading	5–3 (a.e.t.)	Harborough Town	Reading
14:00 GMT (UTC)	Kanu (yellow card) 16' (yellow-red card) 75'; Camará 20'; Savage 59'; Akande 65'; Garcia (yellow card) 78'; Campbell 93', 96'	Report	Robinson 18'; O’Sullivan 21'; Sandro (yellow card) 27'; Tonge 85'; Malone (yellow card) 108'	Stadium: Madejski Stadium; Attendance: 7,916; Referee: Declan Bourne

11 January 2025 Third Round	Reading	1–3 (a.e.t.)	Burnley	Reading
15:00 GMT (UTC)	Wing 77'	Report	Rodriguez (yellow card) 53'; Foster 71'; Flemming 100', 109'	Stadium: Madejski Stadium; Attendance: 7,039; Referee: Andy Davies

=== EFL Cup ===
On 27 June, the draw for the first round was made, with Reading being drawn away against Colchester United.

13 August 2024 First round	Colchester United	2–2 (4–3 p)	Reading	Colchester
19:45 BST (UTC+1)	Hopper 3'; Payne 55' (pen.); Ihionvien (yellow card) 90+9'; Kelleher (yellow card) 90+9'	Report	Kanu (yellow card) 28'; Savage (yellow card) 45+1' (goal) 65'; Wing 73'	Stadium: Colchester Community Stadium; Attendance: 3,123; Referee: Neil Hair
	Penalties
	Ihionvien (penalty scored); Read (penalty scored); Oni (penalty scored); Gordon (penalty scored)		Wareham (penalty scored); Ehibhatiomhan (penalty missed); Bindon (penalty scored); Wing (penalty scored); Mbengue (penalty missed)

=== EFL Trophy ===
==== Group stage ====
In the group stage, Reading were drawn into Southern Group H alongside Cheltenham Town, Newport County and West Ham United U21s. In the round of 32, Reading were drawn away against Walsall.

Pos	Div	Team	Pld	W	PW	PL	L	GF	GA	GD	Pts	Qualification
1	L2	Cheltenham Town	3	3	0	0	0	6	2	+4	9	Advance to Round 2
2	L1	Reading	3	2	0	0	1	6	2	+4	6	Advance to Round 2
3	L2	Newport County	3	1	0	0	2	2	5	−3	3	
4	ACA	West Ham United U21	3	0	0	0	3	2	7	−5	0	

Source: EFL

20 August 2024 1	Reading	3–1	West Ham United U21	Reading
19:00 BST (UTC+1)	Abrefa (yellow card) 14', (goal) 31'; Wareham 22'; Sackey 85'	Report	Dean 38' (o.g.); Akpata (yellow card) 72'; Robinson (yellow card) 87'	Stadium: Madejski Stadium; Attendance: 3,022; Referee: Stephen Parkinson

5 November 2024 2	Cheltenham Town	1–0	Reading	Cheltenham
19:00 GMT (UTC+1)	Colwill (yellow card) 70'; Pett 78'; Liggett (yellow card) 90'; Shipley (yellow card) 90+4'	Report	Akande (yellow card) 46'	Stadium: Whaddon Road; Attendance: 1,598; Referee: James Durkin
Note: Match was originally scheduled for 8 October, but was postponed due to a waterlogged pitch.

12 November 2024 3	Reading	3–0	Newport County	Reading
19:00 GMT (UTC)	Mbengue (yellow card) 13'; Garcia (yellow card) 28'; Knibbs 73', 87'; Wareham 75'	Report		Stadium: Madejski Stadium; Attendance: 1,870; Referee: Sam Mulhall

==== Knockout stage ====
10 December 2024 Round of 32	Walsall	1–1 (4–2 p)	Reading	Walsall
19:00 GMT (UTC)	Weir (yellow card) 17'; Johnson (yellow card) 90' (goal) 90+7'	Report	Savage (yellow card) 21'; Button (red card) 58'; Ahmed (yellow card) 70' (yellow-red card) 75'; Sackey 72'; Wareham (yellow card) 88'	Stadium: Bescot Stadium; Attendance: 1,501; Referee: Steven Copeland
	Penalties
	Adomah (penalty scored); Johnson (penalty scored); Daniels (penalty scored); Cleary (penalty scored)		(penalty missed) Wareham; (penalty scored) Holzman; (penalty missed) Wellens; (penalty scored) Kanu

== Squad statistics ==
=== Appearances and goals ===
As of match played 3 May 2025

Players with no appearances are not included on the list
Italics indicate a loaned in player

No.	Pos	Nat	Player	Total		League One		FA Cup		League Cup		League Trophy	
No.	Pos	Nat	Player	Apps	Goals	Apps	Goals	Apps	Goals	Apps	Goals	Apps	Goals
1	GK	(England) ENG	David Button	11	0	5	0	3	0	0	0	3	0
2	DF	(Ghana) GHA	Kelvin Abrefa	30	1	11+16	0	1	0	1	0	1	1
3	DF	(Montserrat) MSR	Jeriel Dorsett	16	0	11+3	0	0+1	0	0	0	1	0
4	MF	(Cameroon) CMR	Ben Elliott	24	2	17+2	2	2	0	0+1	0	2	0
5	MF	(Scotland) SCO	Michael Craig	35	2	29+1	2	0+2	0	0	0	1+2	0
6	DF	(England) ENG	Harlee Dean	24	0	7+12	0	1+1	0	1	0	2	0
7	FW	(England) ENG	Harvey Knibbs	47	16	41+2	14	1+1	0	1	0	0+1	2
8	MF	(Wales) WAL	Charlie Savage	51	7	40+5	5	2+1	1	1	1	2	0
9	FW	(Nigeria) NGR	Kelvin Ehibhatiomhan	35	4	27+6	4	0	0	0+1	0	1	0
10	FW	(Wales) WAL	Billy Bodin	16	2	3+13	2	0	0	0	0	0	0
11	MF	(England) ENG	Tom Carroll	9	0	0+9	0	0	0	0	0	0	0
14	MF	(Zimbabwe) ZIM	Tivonge Rushesha	22	0	9+9	0	2	0	0	0	1+1	0
17	DF	(Ghana) GHA	Andy Yiadom	14	0	4+10	0	0	0	0	0	0	0
19	FW	(England) ENG	Jayden Wareham	44	7	15+22	5	3	0	1	0	3	2
20	FW	(Wales) WAL	Chem Campbell	42	7	36+3	5	1+1	2	0	0	0+1	0
22	GK	(Portugal) POR	Joel Pereira	40	0	40	0	0	0	0	0	0	0
24	DF	(New Zealand) NZL	Tyler Bindon	47	3	44	2	2	1	0+1	0	0	0
26	FW	(Malta) MLT	Basil Tuma	7	0	0+4	0	1+1	0	0	0	1	0
27	DF	(Senegal) SEN	Amadou Mbengue	37	1	33+1	1	0+1	0	0+1	0	1	0
28	MF	(Guinea-Bissau) GBS	Mamadi Camará	38	4	19+14	3	2	1	0+1	0	2	0
29	MF	(England) ENG	Lewis Wing	50	11	46	9	2	1	1	1	1	0
30	MF	(England) ENG	Andre Garcia	43	0	29+9	0	1	0	1	0	3	0
31	GK	(Jamaica) JAM	Coniah Boyce-Clarke	3	0	1	0	0	0	1	0	1	0
32	DF	(Sierra Leone) SLE	Abraham Kanu	16	0	4+6	0	2	0	1	0	1+2	0
34	DF	(England) ENG	Louie Holzman	15	0	3+6	0	2+1	0	0	0	2+1	0
35	MF	(Belgium) BEL	Jack Senga	3	0	0	0	0+1	0	0	0	0+2	0
37	FW	(Nigeria) NGR	Adrian Akande	21	1	4+11	0	1+1	1	1	0	3	0
38	DF	(England) ENG	Michael Stickland	6	0	4+1	0	0	0	0	0	1	0
39	DF	(England) ENG	Ashqar Ahmed	12	0	0+5	0	2+1	0	0	0	3+1	0
40	MF	(England) ENG	Charlie Wellens	2	0	0	0	0	0	0	0	0+2	0
41	GK	(England) ENG	Tom Norcott	1	0	0	0	0	0	0	0	0+1	0
42	DF	(England) ENG	Boyd Beacroft	1	0	0	0	0	0	0	0	0+1	0
43	FW	(England) ENG	Jeremiah Okine-Peters	1	0	0	0	0	0	0	0	0+1	0
44	MF	(England) ENG	Tyler Sackey	4	2	0	0	0+1	0	0	0	2+1	2
47	MF	(England) ENG	Shay Spencer	5	0	0+1	0	1	0	0	0	3	0
49	DF	(England) ENG	Emmanuel Osho	6	0	0+1	0	0+1	0	1	0	2+1	0
50	FW	(England) ENG	Joe Barough	1	0	0	0	0	0	0	0	1	0
Players who featured but departed the club permanently during the season:
10	FW	(England) ENG	Sam Smith	26	11	24+1	11	1	0	0	0	0	0
11	FW	(England) ENG	Femi Azeez	1	0	0+1	0	0	0	0	0	0	0

=== Goal scorers ===
As of match played 3 May 2025

Place	Position	Nation	Number	Name	League One	FA Cup	League Cup	League Trophy	Total
1	FW	(England)	7	Harvey Knibbs	14	0	0	2	16
2	FW	(England)	10	Sam Smith	11	0	0	0	11
2	MF	(England)	29	Lewis Wing	9	1	1	0	11
4	FW	(Wales)	20	Chem Campbell	5	2	0	0	7
4	MF	(Wales)	8	Charlie Savage	5	1	1	0	7
4	FW	(England)	19	Jayden Wareham	5	0	0	2	7
7	FW	(Nigeria)	9	Kelvin Ehibhatiomhan	4	0	0	0	4
7	MF	(Guinea-Bissau)	28	Mamadi Camará	3	1	0	0	4
7				Own goal	3	1	0	0	4
10	DF	(New Zealand)	24	Tyler Bindon	2	1	0	0	3
11	MF	(Cameroon)	4	Ben Elliott	2	0	0	0	2
11	MF	(Scotland)	5	Michael Craig	2	0	0	0	2
11	FW	(Wales)	10	Billy Bodin	2	0	0	0	2
11	MF	(England)	44	Tyler Sackey	0	0	0	2	2
15	DF	(Senegal)	27	Amadou Mbengue	1	0	0	0	1
15	FW	(Nigeria)	37	Adrian Akande	0	1	0	0	1
15	DF	(Ghana)	2	Kelvin Abrefa	0	0	0	1	1
Total					68	8	2	7	84

=== Clean sheets ===
As of match played 3 May 2025

Place	Position	Nation	Number	Name	League One	FA Cup	League Cup	League Trophy	Total
1	GK	(Portugal)	22	Joel Pereira	13	0	0	0	13
2	GK	(England)	1	David Button	0	1	0	1	2
Total					13	1	0	1	15

=== Disciplinary record ===
As of match played 3 May 2025

Number	Nation	Position	Name	League One		FA Cup		League Cup		League Trophy		Total	
Number	Nation	Position	Name	Yellow card	Red card	Yellow card	Red card	Yellow card	Red card	Yellow card	Red card	Yellow card	Red card
1	(England)	GK	David Button	0	0	0	0	0	0	0	1	0	1
2	(Ghana)	DF	Kelvin Abrefa	1	0	0	0	0	0	1	0	2	0
4	(Cameroon)	MF	Ben Elliott	4	0	0	0	0	0	0	0	4	0
5	(Scotland)	MF	Michael Craig	3	0	0	0	0	0	0	0	3	0
6	(England)	DF	Harlee Dean	2	0	0	0	0	0	0	0	2	0
7	(England)	FW	Harvey Knibbs	4	0	0	0	0	0	0	0	4	0
8	(Wales)	MF	Charlie Savage	6	0	0	0	1	0	1	0	8	0
9	(Nigeria)	FW	Kelvin Ehibhatiomhan	6	1	0	0	0	0	0	0	6	1
11	(England)	MF	Tom Carroll	1	0	0	0	0	0	0	0	1	0
14	(Zimbabwe)	MF	Tivonge Rushesha	0	0	1	0	0	0	0	0	1	0
17	(Ghana)	DF	Andy Yiadom	3	0	0	0	0	0	0	0	3	0
19	(England)	FW	Jayden Wareham	2	0	0	0	0	0	1	0	3	0
20	(Wales)	FW	Chem Campbell	3	0	0	0	0	0	0	0	3	0
22	(Portugal)	GK	Joel Pereira	2	0	0	0	0	0	0	0	2	0
24	(New Zealand)	DF	Tyler Bindon	3	0	0	0	0	0	0	0	3	0
27	(Senegal)	DF	Amadou Mbengue	10	0	0	0	0	0	1	0	11	0
28	(Guinea-Bissau)	MF	Mamadi Camará	3	0	0	0	0	0	0	0	3	0
29	(England)	MF	Lewis Wing	5	0	0	0	0	0	0	0	5	0
30	(England)	MF	Andre Garcia	5	0	1	0	0	0	1	0	7	0
32	(Sierra Leone)	DF	Abraham Kanu	0	0	2	1	1	0	0	0	3	1
34	(England)	DF	Louie Holzman	1	1	0	0	0	0	0	0	1	1
37	(Nigeria)	FW	Adrian Akande	0	0	0	0	0	0	1	0	1	0
38	(England)	DF	Michael Stickland	2	1	0	0	0	0	0	0	2	1
39	(England)	DF	Ashqar Ahmed	1	0	0	0	0	0	2	1	3	1
Players away on loan:
Players who left Reading during the season:
10	(England)	FW	Sam Smith	7	0	0	0	0	0	0	0	7	0
Total				74	3	4	1	2	0	8	2	88	6
