= Ashqar Ahmed =

English footballer

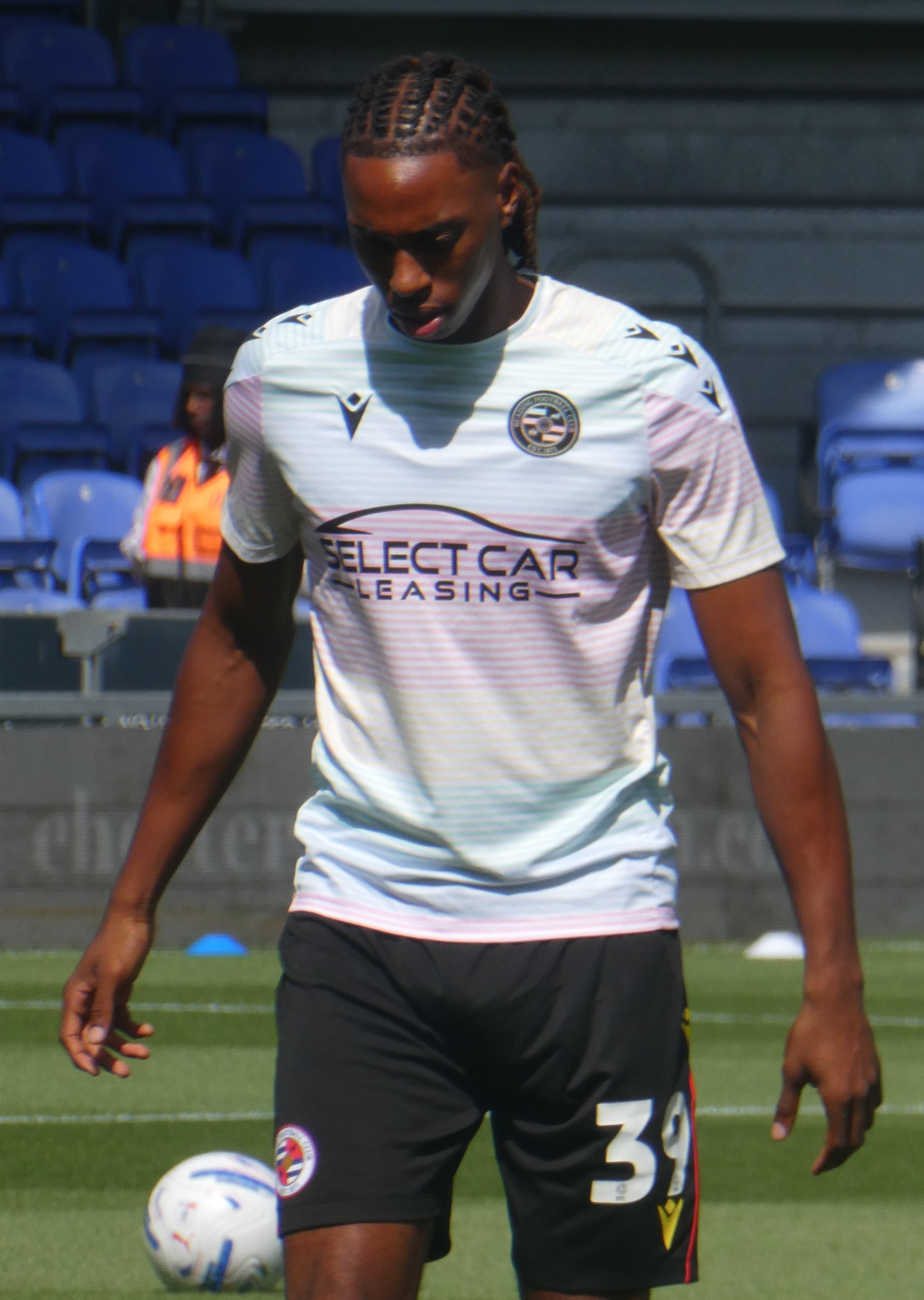
- Ahmed in 2026

Personal information
- Full name: Ashqar Zamil Ahmed
- Date of birth: 31 August 2007 (age 19)
- Place of birth: England
- Height: 1.84 m (6 ft 0 in)
- Position: Defender

Team information
- Current team: Reading
- Number: 39

Youth career
- –2024: Reading

Senior career*
Years	Team	Apps	(Gls)
2024–	Reading	14	(0)
2026	→ Forest Green Rovers (loan)	13	(0)
- * Club domestic league appearances and goals as of 10:55, 30 April 2026 (UTC)

Ashqar Zamil Ahmed (born 31 August 2007) is an English professional footballer who plays as a defender for EFL League One club Reading.

== Career ==
Ahmed made his professional debut with Reading in a 3–1 EFL Trophy win over West Ham United U21 on 20 August 2024. Ahmed went on to make his league debut for Reading on 9 November 2024, in a 1–1 away draw to Stevenage, coming on as a 75th minute substitute for Michael Craig.

On 2 July 2025, Reading announced that Ahmed had signed a new two-year contract with the club.

On 6 February 2026, Ahmed joined Forest Green Rovers on loan for the remainder of the season.

== Career statistics ==
As of match played 10 November 2026

Appearances and goals by club, season and competition
Club	Season	League			National Cup		League Cup		Other		Total	
Club	Season	Division	Apps	Goals	Apps	Goals	Apps	Goals	Apps	Goals	Apps	Goals
Reading	2024–25	League One	5	0	3	0	0	0	4 (Note: Appearances in EFL Trophy)	0	12	0
Reading	2025–26	League One	9	0	0	0	2	0	1	0	12	0
Reading	2026–27	League One	0	0	1	0	2	0	3	0	6	0
Reading	Total		14	0	4	0	4	0	8	0	30	0
Forest Green Rovers (loan)	2025–26	National League	13	0	0	0	—		0	0	13	0
Career total			27	0	4	0	4	0	8	0	43	0
