= Mamadi Camará (footballer, born 2003) =

Bissau-Guinean footballer

Personal information
- Full name: Mamadi Caba Camará
- Date of birth: 31 December 2003 (age 22)
- Place of birth: Catió, Guinea-Bissau
- Height: 1.74 m (5 ft 9 in)
- Position: Attacking midfielder

Team information
- Current team: Kayserispor
- Number: 28

Youth career
- –2020: C.D. Feirense
- 2020–2021: Reading

Senior career*
Years	Team	Apps	(Gls)
2021–2026	Reading	52	(4)
2026–	Kayserispor	13	(2)

International career^{‡}
2022–	Guinea-Bissau	10	(0)
- * Club domestic league appearances and goals as of 9 November 2026 ‡ National team caps and goals as of 29 September 2026

Mamadi Caba Camará (born 31 December 2003) is a Bissau-Guinean professional footballer who plays as an attacking midfielder, for TFF 1. Lig club Kayserispor and the Guinea-Bissau national team.

== Career ==
After playing youth football for C.D. Feirense, he joined Reading in 2020. He made his debut as a substitute in a 1–0 FA Cup defeat away to Luton Town on 9 January 2021. On 3 February 2021, Camará signed his first professional contract with Reading, until the summer of 2022. He scored his first goal for Reading in a 4–0 win over Millwall in the EFL Cup on 8 August 2023.

At the beginning of the 2024–25 season, he was given a starting place in Reading's first match of the season away to Birmingham City in place of Femi Azeez.

On 5 May 2026, Reading announced that Camará would leave the club once his contract expires on 30 June 2026.

In July 2026 it was confirmed that Camará had joined TFF 1. Lig club Kayserispor.

== International career ==
Camará received his first call-up for Guinea-Bissau national football team for the friendlies against Angola and Equatorial Guinea on 23 and 26 March 2022. Camará made his debut for Guinea-Bissau on 23 March 2022 against Equatorial Guinea with a man-of-the-match performance.

== Career statistics ==
As of match played 8 November 2026

Appearances and goals by club, season and competition
Club	Season	League			National Cup (Note: Includes FA Cup, Turkish Cup)		League Cup (Note: Includes EFL Cup)		Other		Total	
Club	Season	Division	Apps	Goals	Apps	Goals	Apps	Goals	Apps	Goals	Apps	Goals
Reading	2020–21	EFL Championship	1	0	1	0	0	0	-		2	0
Reading	2021–22	EFL Championship	6	0	1	0	1	0	-		8	0
Reading	2022–23	EFL Championship	5	0	0	0	1	0	-		6	0
Reading	2023–24	EFL League One	6	0	0	0	1	1	0 (Note: Appearances in the EFL Trophy)	0	7	1
Reading	2024–25	EFL League One	33	3	2	1	1	0	2	0	38	4
Reading	2025–26	EFL League One	11	1	1	0	2	1	0	0	14	2
Reading	Total		52	4	5	1	6	2	2	0	75	7
Kayserispor	2026–27	TFF 1. Lig	13	2	0	0	-		-		13	2
Career total			65	6	5	1	6	2	2	0	88	9

=== International ===
As of match played 29 September 2025

National team	Year	Apps	Goals
Guinea-Bissau
Guinea-Bissau	2022	5	0
Guinea-Bissau	2025	3	0
Guinea-Bissau	2026	2	0
Total		10	0
