= Sam Smith (footballer, born 1998) =

English footballer

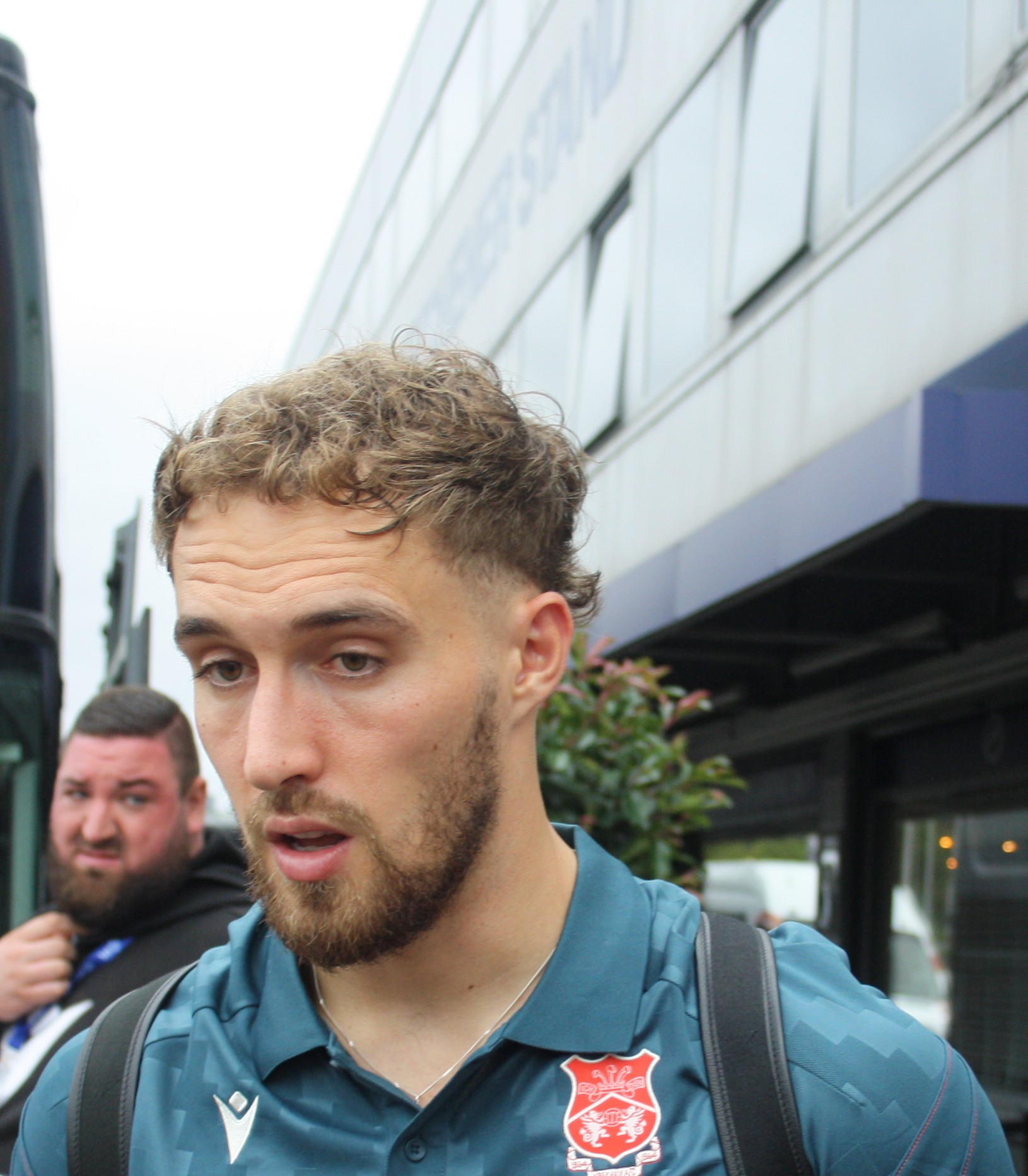
- Smith in 2025

Personal information
- Full name: Samuel Toby Smith
- Date of birth: 8 March 1998 (age 28)
- Place of birth: Manchester, England
- Height: 6 ft 1 in (1.85 m)
- Position: Forward

Team information
- Current team: Wrexham
- Number: 28

Youth career
- 2004–2014: Manchester United
- 2014–2016: Reading

Senior career*
Years	Team	Apps	(Gls)
2016–2021	Reading	8	(1)
2016	→ Bishop's Stortford (loan)	7	(2)
2018–2019	→ Oxford United (loan)	14	(0)
2019	→ Shrewsbury Town (loan)	3	(0)
2019–2020	→ Cambridge United (loan)	28	(7)
2020	→ Tranmere Rovers (loan)	5	(0)
2021	→ Cheltenham Town (loan)	21	(4)
2021–2023	Cambridge United	91	(28)
2023–2025	Reading	59	(26)
2025–	Wrexham	69	(16)
- * Club domestic league appearances and goals as of 18:08, 17 October 2026 (UTC)

Samuel Toby Smith (born 8 March 1998) is an English professional footballer who plays as a forward for EFL Championship club Wrexham.

== Career ==
=== Reading ===
Smith signed his first professional contract with Reading in 2016. He made his debut appearance during a 2–0 EFL Cup win over Gillingham on 8 August 2017, and scored his first goal for Reading in the cup's second-round tie against Millwall on 22 August.

In February 2018, Smith signed a new contract with Reading until the end of the 2020–21 season.

==== Loan spells ====
On 26 August 2016, Smith joined Bishop's Stortford on a four-month loan. In July 2018 he joined Oxford United of League One on a season-long loan. He made his debut as a substitute in the first match of the league season, a 4–0 away defeat to Barnsley. His first start and home debut came in the following match, a 2–0 defeat to Fleetwood Town. He scored his first goal for Oxford in a 3–0 EFL Trophy win over Fulham Under 21s on 4 September 2018. His loan was ended early at the end of 2018, with Smith's record standing at 3 goals (all in the EFL Trophy) in 23 appearances in all competitions.

In January 2019, Smith signed for Shrewsbury Town on loan until the end of the 2018–19 season. He played the 2019–20 season with Cambridge United in League Two, and the first half of the 2020–21 season with Tranmere Rovers. After making five appearances, Smith returned to Reading before signing a loan deal with Cheltenham Town on 29 January 2021.

=== Cambridge United ===
On 11 May 2021, Reading announced that Smith would leave the club when his contract expired on 30 June 2021. On 7 July 2021, Smith signed a permanent deal with Cambridge United, signing a 2-year contract.

He was released at the end of the 2022–23 season.

=== Reading ===
On 17 July 2023, Smith returned to Reading, signing a three-year contract with the club.

=== Wrexham ===
On 31 January 2025, Smith joined Wrexham for an undisclosed sum, signing a three-and-a-half year deal with the option to extend. Smith's transfer fee was reported to be in excess of £1 million, a club record fee for Wrexham.

== Career statistics ==
As of match played 17 October 2026

Appearances and goals by club, season and competition
Club	Season	League			FA Cup		League Cup		Other		Total	
Club	Season	Division	Apps	Goals	Apps	Goals	Apps	Goals	Apps	Goals	Apps	Goals
Reading	2016–17	Championship	0	0	0	0	0	0	—		0	0
Reading	2017–18	Championship	8	1	1	0	2	1	—		11	2
Reading	2018–19	Championship	0	0	0	0	0	0	—		0	0
Reading	2019–20	Championship	0	0	0	0	0	0	—		0	0
Reading	2020–21	Championship	0	0	0	0	0	0	—		0	0
Bishop's Stortford (loan)	2016–17	National League North	7	2	0	0	0	0	—		7	2
Oxford United (loan)	2018–19	League One	14	0	2	0	3	0	4 (Note: Appearances in EFL Trophy)	3	23	3
Shrewsbury Town (loan)	2018–19	League One	2	0	0	0	0	0	0	0	2	0
Cambridge United (loan)	2019–20	League Two	28	7	2	1	0	0	0	0	30	8
Tranmere Rovers (loan)	2020–21	League Two	5	0	0	0	0	0	2	0	7	0
Cheltenham Town (loan)	2020–21	League Two	21	4	0	0	0	0	0	0	21	4
Cambridge United	2021–22	League One	46	15	4	2	2	0	5	4	57	21
Cambridge United	2022–23	League One	45	13	3	1	2	0	2	0	52	14
Cambridge United	Total		91	28	7	3	4	0	7	4	109	35
Reading	2023–24	League One	34	15	1	0	0	0	2	1	37	16
Reading	2024–25	League One	25	11	1	0	0	0	0	0	26	11
Reading	Total		59	26	2	0	0	0	2	1	63	27
Wrexham	2024–25	League One	18	7	0	0	0	0	1	0	19	7
Wrexham	2025–26	Championship	40	8	3	1	4	1	—		47	10
Wrexham	2026–27	Championship	11	1	0	0	1	0	0	0	12	1
Wrexham	Total		69	16	3	1	5	1	1	0	78	18
Career total			304	84	17	5	14	2	16	8	351	99

== Honours ==
Cheltenham Town

- EFL League Two: 2020–21

Wrexham

- EFL League One second-place promotion: 2024–25
