= Kelvin Abrefa =

Ghanaian footballer (born 2003)

Personal information
- Full name: Kelvin Opoku Abrefa
- Date of birth: 9 December 2003 (age 22)
- Place of birth: Italy
- Height: 1.74 m (5 ft 9 in)
- Position: Right-back

Team information
- Current team: Forest Green Rovers (on loan from Reading)
- Number: 29

Youth career
- –2021: Reading

Senior career*
Years	Team	Apps	(Gls)
2021–	Reading	71	(0)
2026–	→ Forest Green Rovers (loan)	9	(0)

International career^{‡}
2022	Ghana U20	1	(0)
- * Club domestic league appearances and goals as of 14:42, 3 November 2026 (UTC) ‡ National team caps and goals as of 12:43, 2 June 2022 (UTC)

Kelvin Opoku Abrefa (born 9 December 2003) is a professional footballer who plays as a defender for Forest Green Rovers, on loan from EFL League One club Reading. Born in Italy, he is a youth international for Ghana.

== Club career ==
Abrefa made his professional debut for Reading, coming on in the 87th minute for Tom Holmes in a 3–2 EFL Championship loss to Coventry City on 12 February 2022. On 25 March 2022, Abrefa signed his first professional contract with Reading on a contract until the summer of 2024. He scored his first goal for the club on 7 January 2023 in a FA Cup match against Watford when his looping cross from the right wing flew over the opposing goalkeeper and went in off the far post.

Following the conclusion of the 2023–24 season, Abrefa signed a new two-year contract to remain with the Royals on 27 June 2024. Following the conclusion of the 2025–26 season, Abrefa extended his contract with Reading for another two years.

On 4 September 2026, Abrefa had joined Forest Green Rovers on a three-month loan deal.

== International career ==
Born in Italy to Ghanaian parents and growing up in England, Abrefa was eligible to represent all three at international level. Abrefa was called up to the Ghana U20 team for the first time in May 2022, for the 2022 Maurice Revello Tournament. Abrefa went on to make his debut for them on 2 June 2022 against Indonesia U19.

== Personal life ==
Abrefa was born in Italy to Ghanaian parents, and moved to England at a young age.

== Career statistics ==
=== Club ===
As of match played 7 November 2026

Appearances and goals by club, season and competition
Club	Season	League			FA Cup		League Cup		Continental		Other		Total	
Club	Season	Division	Apps	Goals	Apps	Goals	Apps	Goals	Apps	Goals	Apps	Goals	Apps	Goals
Reading	2021–22	EFL Championship	3	0	0	0	0	0	—				3	0
Reading	2022–23	EFL Championship	8	0	1	1	1	0	—				10	1
Reading	2023–24	EFL League One	11	0	0	0	1	0	—		1 (Note: Appearances in the EFL Trophy)	0	13	0
Reading	2024–25	EFL League One	27	0	1	0	1	0	—		1	1	30	1
Reading	2025–26	EFL League One	22	0	1	0	2	0	—		2	0	27	0
Reading	2026–27	EFL League One	0	0	—		—		—		—		0	0
Reading	Total		71	0	3	1	4	0	0	0	4	1	83	2
Forest Green Rovers (loan)	2026–27	National League	9	0	3	0	—				0	0	12	0
Career total			80	0	6	1	4	0	0	0	4	1	95	2
