= Chem Campbell =

Welsh footballer (born 2002)

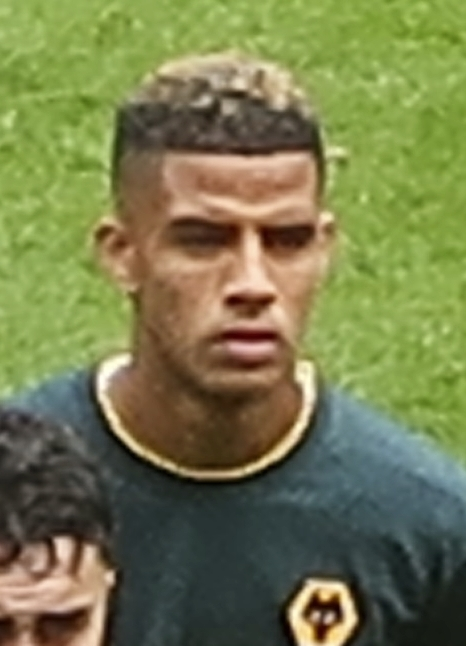
- Campbell with Wolverhampton Wanderers in 2021

Personal information
- Full name: Chem Campbell
- Date of birth: 30 December 2002 (age 23)
- Place of birth: Birmingham, England
- Height: 1.80 m (5 ft 11 in)
- Position: Winger

Team information
- Current team: Stevenage
- Number: 20

Youth career
- Birmingham City
- Wolverhampton Wanderers

Senior career*
Years	Team	Apps	(Gls)
2019–2025	Wolverhampton Wanderers	6	(0)
2023	→ Wycombe Wanderers (loan)	17	(3)
2023–2024	→ Charlton Athletic (loan)	12	(2)
2024	→ Wycombe Wanderers (loan)	8	(0)
2024–2025	→ Reading (loan)	19	(3)
2025	→ Reading (loan)	20	(2)
2025–	Stevenage	28	(4)

International career
2018	Wales U17	1	(0)
- * Club domestic league appearances and goals as of 17:10, 13 May 2026 (UTC)

Chem Campbell (born 30 December 2002) is a Welsh footballer who plays as a winger for EFL League One club Stevenage. He is a former youth international for Wales.

== Club career ==
=== Wolverhampton Wanderers ===
Campbell made his professional debut for Wolverhampton Wanderers, on 30 October 2019 in a 2–1 defeat against Aston Villa in the EFL Cup. Aged 16, he became the club's second youngest player after Jimmy Mullen in 1939. He made his Premier League debut as a second-half substitute in 1–0 loss away to Newcastle United on 8 April 2022.

On 30 January 2023, Campbell joined League One club Wycombe Wanderers on loan until the end of the 2022-23 season.

Campbell joined Charlton Athletic on a season-long loan on 23 August 2023. He returned to Wolverhampton Wanderers on 15 January 2024. The next day, he returned to Wycombe on loan until the end of the 2023–24 season.

On 30 August 2024, Campbell joined League One side Reading on a short-term loan deal until 5 January 2025. After his initial loan deal expired, Campbell returned to Reading on loan for the remainder of the season on 10 January 2025.

=== Stevenage ===
On 10 June 2025, Campbell signed for League One side Stevenage for an undisclosed fee.

== International career ==
Born in England, Campbell is of Jamaican and Welsh descent. He played for the Wales U17s in 2018.

== Career statistics ==
As of match played 21 April 2026

Appearances and goals by club, season and competition
Club	Season	League			National Cup		League Cup		Other		Total	
Club	Season	Division	Apps	Goals	Apps	Goals	Apps	Goals	Apps	Goals	Apps	Goals
Wolverhampton Wanderers	2019–20	Premier League	0	0	0	0	1	0	—		1	0
Wolverhampton Wanderers	2020–21	Premier League	0	0	0	0	0	0	—		0	0
Wolverhampton Wanderers	2021–22	Premier League	1	0	0	0	0	0	—		1	0
Wolverhampton Wanderers	2022–23	Premier League	5	0	0	0	1	0	—		6	0
Wolverhampton Wanderers	2023–24	Premier League	0	0	0	0	0	0	—		0	0
Wolverhampton Wanderers	2024–25	Premier League	0	0	0	0	0	0	—		0	0
Wolverhampton Wanderers	Total		6	0	0	0	2	0	0	0	8	0
Wycombe Wanderers (loan)	2022–23	League One	17	3	—		—		—		17	3
Charlton Athletic (loan)	2023–24	League One	12	2	2	0	0	0	2 (Note: Two appearances in the EFL Trophy)	0	16	2
Wycombe Wanderers (loan)	2023–24	League One	8	0	—		—		—		8	0
Reading (loan)	2024–25	League One	39	5	2	2	0	0	1 (Note: One appearance in the EFL Trophy)	0	42	7
Stevenage	2025–26	League One	28	4	1	0	1	0	2 (Note: Two appearances in the EFL Trophy)	0	32	4
Career total			110	14	5	2	3	0	5	0	123	16
