= Tyler Bindon =

New Zealand footballer (born 2005)

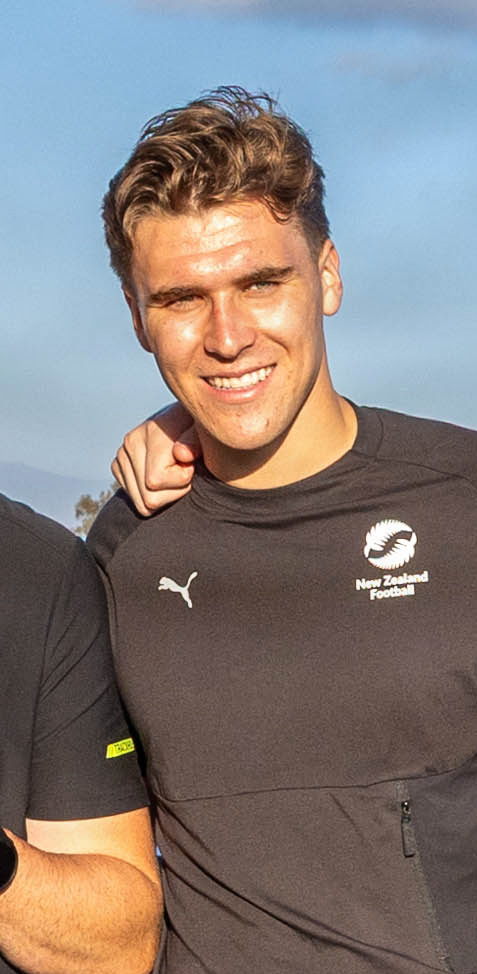
- Bindon in 2026.

Personal information
- Full name: Tyler Grant Bindon
- Date of birth: 27 January 2005 (age 21)
- Place of birth: Auckland, New Zealand
- Height: 1.90 m (6 ft 3 in)
- Position: Centre-back

Team information
- Current team: Charlton Athletic (on loan from Nottingham Forest)
- Number: 44

Youth career
- –2017: East Coast Bays
- 2017–2023: Los Angeles FC

Senior career*
Years	Team	Apps	(Gls)
2023–2025	Reading	68	(3)
2025–	Nottingham Forest	0	(0)
2025	→ Reading (loan)	16	(1)
2025–2026	→ Sheffield United (loan)	25	(1)
2026–	→ Charlton Athletic (loan)	8	(0)

International career^{‡}
2023	United States U19	2	(0)
2024–	New Zealand U23	3	(0)
2023–	New Zealand	32	(3)
Medal record
Men's football
Representing New Zealand
OFC Nations Cup
Winner	2024 Fiji/Vanuatu
- * Club domestic league appearances and goals as of 17:10, 21 November 2026 (UTC) ‡ National team caps and goals as of 17:10, 5 October 2026 (UTC)

Tyler Grant Bindon (born 27 January 2005) is a New Zealand professional footballer who plays as a centre-back for EFL Championship club Charlton Athletic on loan from Premier League side Nottingham Forest, and the New Zealand national team.

== Early life ==
Bindon was born in Auckland on 27 January 2005, to Jenny and Grant Bindon; his mother won 77 caps for the New Zealand women's soccer team and his father captained the New Zealand volleyball team. Bindon moved to California at age 12 after his mother was hired as a coach for the UCLA women's soccer team.

== Club career ==
Bindon began his career in New Zealand with East Coast Bays.

On 7 August 2023, Bindon signed a two-year contract with EFL League One club Reading after moving from the LAFC Academy and featuring in four pre-season games under manager Rubén Sellés. He made his professional debut the following day, in a 4–0 win at Millwall in the EFL Cup. Bindon scored his first Reading goal in a 2–1 defeat to Leyton Orient on 7 October 2023. Bindon finished runner-up in the 2023–24 Player of the Season Award for Reading after making 44 appearances and scoring two goals in his first season. Bindon captained Reading for the first time on 2 November 2024 against Fleetwood Town in the first round of the FA Cup where he scored the opening goal in a 2–0 win.

On 3 February 2025, Bindon signed with Premier League side Nottingham Forest on a deal until June 2028 for an undisclosed transfer fee. He was immediately loaned back to Reading for the remainder of the 2024–25 season.

On 16 April 2025, Bindon was nominated for the 2024–25 EFL League One Young Player of the Season award alongside Louie Barry and Richard Kone. On 4 May 2025, Bindon was announced as Reading's Player of the Season, after scoring 3 goals in 47 appearances, helping Reading to a 7th-place finish.

On 4 July 2025, Bindon was loaned to Championship side Sheffield United for the 2025–26 season. On 20 December 2025, Bindon scored his first goal for Sheffield United in a 3–0 win over Birmingham City.

On 30 August 2026, Bindon was loaned to Championship side Charlton Athletic on a season-long loan.

== International career ==
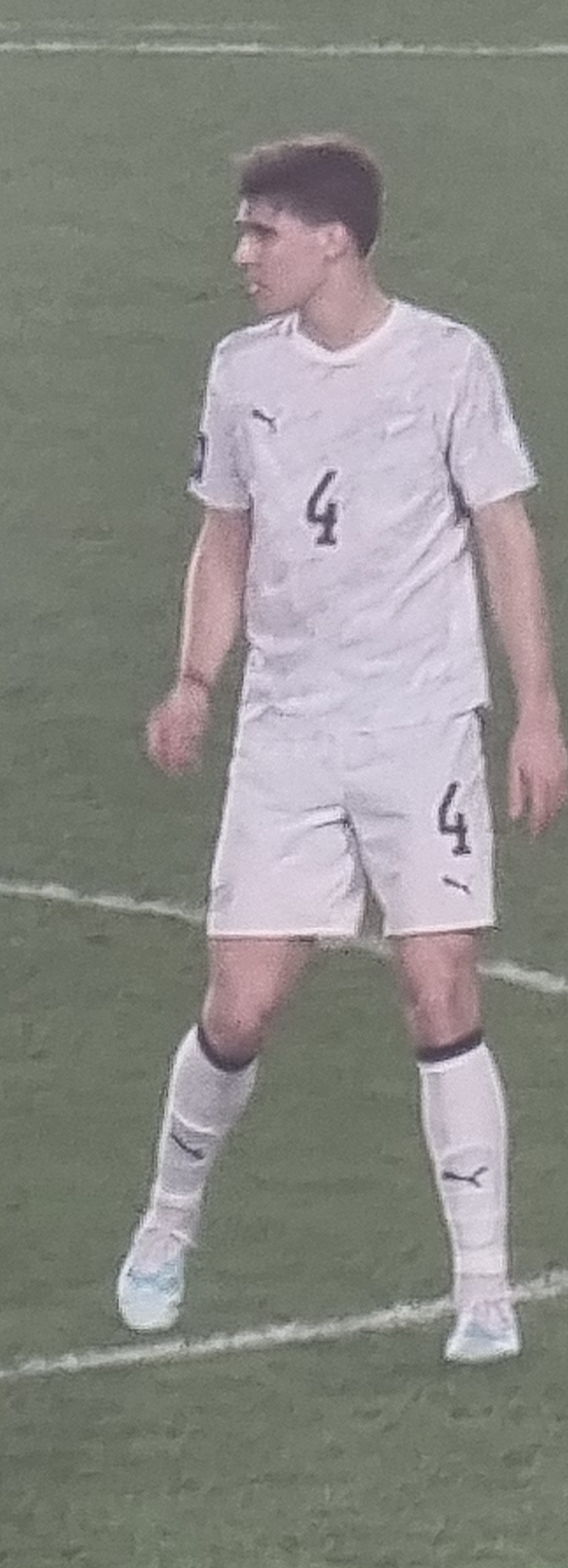
Bindon playing for the All Whites in March 2026.

Bindon won his first cap for the United States under-19 team against Argentina in March 2023, having been eligible to represent the US through his American-born mother.

On 26 September 2023, Bindon was called up to the New Zealand men's national football team for the first time. Bindon made his debut on 13 October 2023 when he came on as a late substitute replacing Michael Boxall against the Democratic Republic of Congo. On 17 November 2023, Bindon made his first start for New Zealand in a friendly against Greece. In February 2024, Bindon was nominated for the 2023 New Zealand Men's Young Player of the Year.

In July 2024 he was selected to the New Zealand squad at the 2024 Summer Olympics. Bindon made his Olympic debut in the opening group game, a 2–1 win over Guinea.

Bindon scored his first goal for New Zealand on 15 November 2024, in a 8–1 victory over Vanuatu.

On 14 May 2026, he was named in the 26-man squad for the 2026 FIFA World Cup.

== Career statistics ==
=== Club ===
As of match played 21 November 2026.

Appearances and goals by club, season and competition
Club	Season	League			FA Cup		EFL Cup		Other		Total	
Club	Season	Division	Apps	Goals	Apps	Goals	Apps	Goals	Apps	Goals	Apps	Goals
Reading	2023–24	League One	40	2	1	0	1	0	2 (Note: Appearance(s) in the EFL Trophy.)	0	44	2
Reading	2024–25	League One	28	1	2	1	1	0	0	0	31	2
Reading	Total		68	3	3	1	2	0	2	0	75	4
Nottingham Forest	2024–25	Premier League	0	0	0	0	0	0	—		0	0
Nottingham Forest	2025–26	Premier League	0	0	0	0	0	0	0	0	0	0
Nottingham Forest	2026–27	Premier League	0	0	0	0	0	0	—		0	0
Nottingham Forest	Total		0	0	0	0	0	0	0	0	0	0
Reading (loan)	2024–25	League One	16	1	0	0	0	0	0	0	16	1
Sheffield United (loan)	2025–26	Championship	25	1	0	0	1	0	—		26	1
Charlton Athletic (loan)	2026–27	Championship	8	0	0	0	—		—		8	0
Career total			117	5	3	1	3	0	2	0	125	6

=== International ===
As of match played 5 October 2026

National team	Year	Apps	Goals
New Zealand	2023	4	0
New Zealand	2024	9	1
New Zealand	2025	8	1
New Zealand	2026	11	1
Total		32	3

=== International goals ===
List of international goals scored by Tyler Bindon
No.	Cap	Date	Venue	Opponent	Score	Result	Competition
1.	13	15 November 2024	Waikato Stadium, Hamilton, New Zealand	Vanuatu	4–1	8–1	2026 FIFA World Cup qualification
2.	14	21 March 2025	Wellington Regional Stadium, Wellington, New Zealand	Fiji	3–0	7–0	2026 FIFA World Cup qualification
3.	30	27 September 2026	Longxing Football Stadium, Chongqing, China	China	1–0	3–0	Friendly

== Honours ==
New Zealand

- OFC Nations Cup: 2024

Individual

- Halberg Emerging Talent Award: 2024
- Reading Player of the Season: 2024–25
