= Michael Craig (footballer, born 2003) =

Scottish footballer

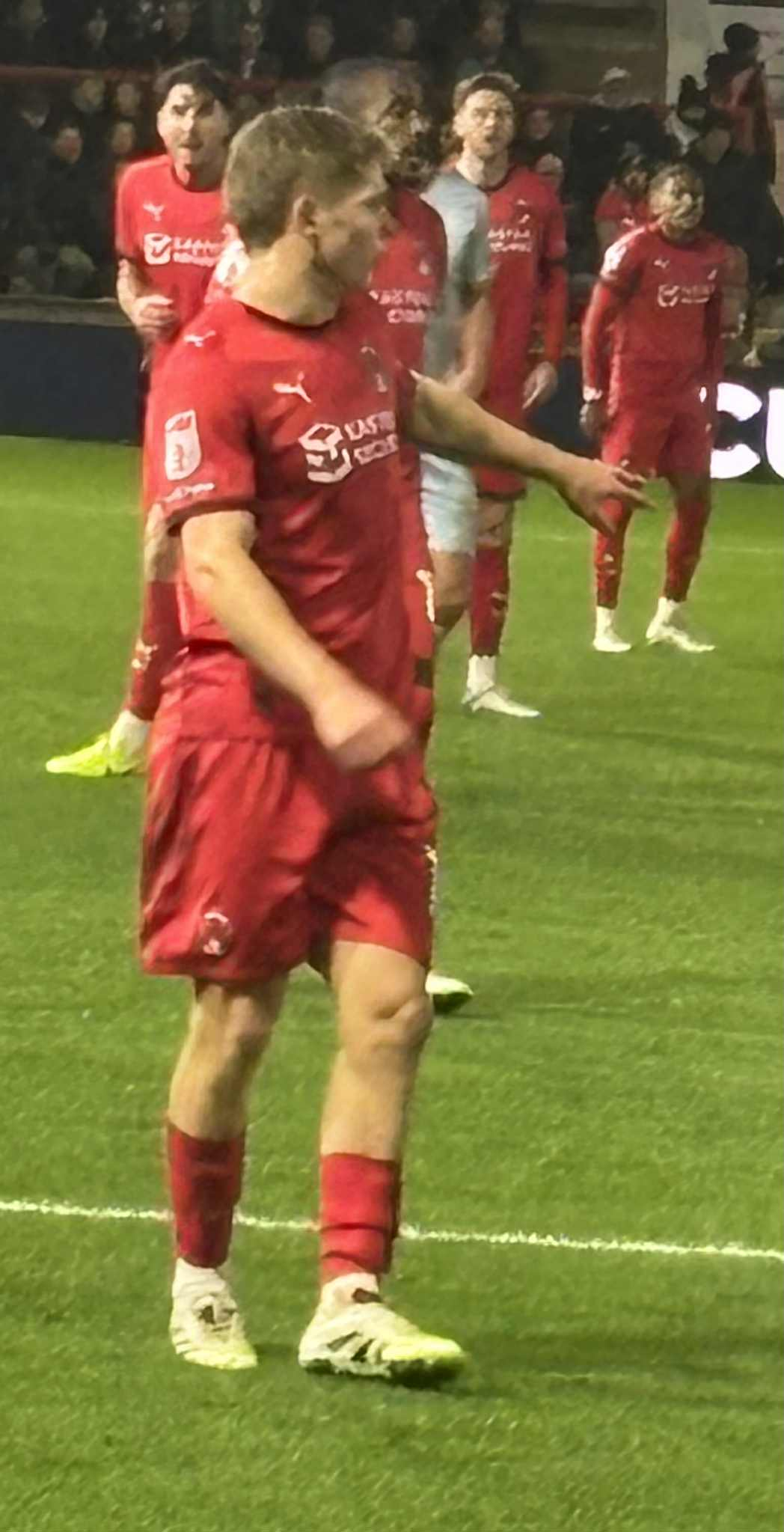
- Craig in 2025

Personal information
- Full name: Michael James Craig
- Date of birth: 16 April 2003 (age 23)
- Place of birth: Barnet, England
- Position: Right-back

Team information
- Current team: Harrogate Town (on loan from Leyton Orient)
- Number: 19

Youth career
- Watford
- 2015–2022: Tottenham Hotspur

Senior career*
Years	Team	Apps	(Gls)
2022–2025	Reading	60	(2)
2025–	Leyton Orient	23	(0)
2026–	→ Harrogate Town (loan)	4	(0)

International career^{‡}
2018	Scotland U16	3	(0)
2019	Scotland U17	3	(0)
2021–2022	Scotland U19	6	(0)
2022	Scotland U21	1	(0)
- * Club domestic league appearances and goals as of 17:59, 10 October 2026 (UTC) ‡ National team caps and goals as of 20:42, 25 September 2022 (UTC)

Michael James Craig (born 16 April 2003) is a professional footballer who plays as a right-back for National League side Harrogate Town, on loan from EFL League One club Leyton Orient. Born in England, he was a youth international for Scotland.

== Background ==
Michael Craig and his younger identical twin brother Matthew were born 2 minutes apart on 16 March 2003. Both of their grandfathers hail from Scotland including Aberdeen born Ron Still who top scored for Notts County one season and also played for Brentford, both in the mid-1960s.

== Club career ==
Craig and twin brother Matthew both played for Watford at a young age before both joined Tottenham Hotspur when aged 12. Michael was at Arsenal between Watford and Spurs. Whilst with Tottenham Hotspur, Craig featured on the bench for the away leg of their UEFA Europa Conference League Playoff tie against Paços de Ferreira. In February 2022, he went on trial with fellow Premier League side Southampton.

=== Reading ===
In April 2022, Craig featured for Reading in their Berks & Bucks Senior Cup semi-final against Milton Keynes Dons.

On 22 June 2022, Reading announced the signing of Craig to their U23 team. Craig made his debut for Reading in their 2–1 EFL Cup defeat to Stevenage on 9 August 2022, coming on as a second-half substitute for Tyrese Fornah.

On 8 May 2024, Reading activated a one-year extension to Craig's contract, keeping him at the club until the summer of 2025.

For the 2024/25 season, Craig was given the number 5 shirt, and featured predominantly at right-back in the first stages of the campaign. Rubén Sellés confirmed that during the off-season Craig had alerted him to his ability to play at right-back, in addition to his usual central midfield position, via a text message. On 22 October 2024, Craig scored his first senior goal in a 2–1 away win against Exeter City. Craig scored his second goal of the season on 28 January 2025, in a 3-2 defeat away to Burton Albion. In March, Craig was ruled out for the remainder of the season as a result of injury.

=== Leyton Orient ===
On 4 July 2025 he signed for Leyton Orient.

== International career ==
Both born in England, Michael Craig and his younger identical twin Matthew Craig have represented Scotland at age group level. Matthew said of their international allegiance, "Both of my grandfathers are Scottish. Obviously, once Scotland came calling, it was a big honour to be selected here, There wasn't a debate."

Craig has represented Scotland at U16, U17 and U19 level. On 8 September 2022, Craig was called up to the Scotland U21 squad for the first time, making his debut on 22 September 2022 against Northern Ireland.

== Career statistics ==
=== Club ===
As of match played 28 February 2026

Appearances and goals by club, season and competition
Club	Season	League			FA Cup		EFL Cup		Other		Total	
Club	Season	Division	Apps	Goals	Apps	Goals	Apps	Goals	Apps	Goals	Apps	Goals
Tottenham Hotspur	2021–22	Premier League	0	0	0	0	0	0	0	0	0	0
Tottenham Hotspur U21	2021–22	—			—		—		2 (Note: Appearance(s) in EFL Trophy)	0	2	0
Reading	2022–23	Championship	2	0	2	0	1	0	—		5	0
Reading	2023–24	League One	28	0	2	0	2	0	4	0	36	0
Reading	2024–25	League One	30	2	2	0	0	0	3	0	35	2
Reading	Total		60	2	6	0	3	0	7	0	76	2
Leyton Orient	2025–26	League One	23	0	2	0	1	0	2	1	28	1
Career total			83	2	8	0	4	0	11	1	106	3
