= Femi Azeez =

Footballer (born 2001)

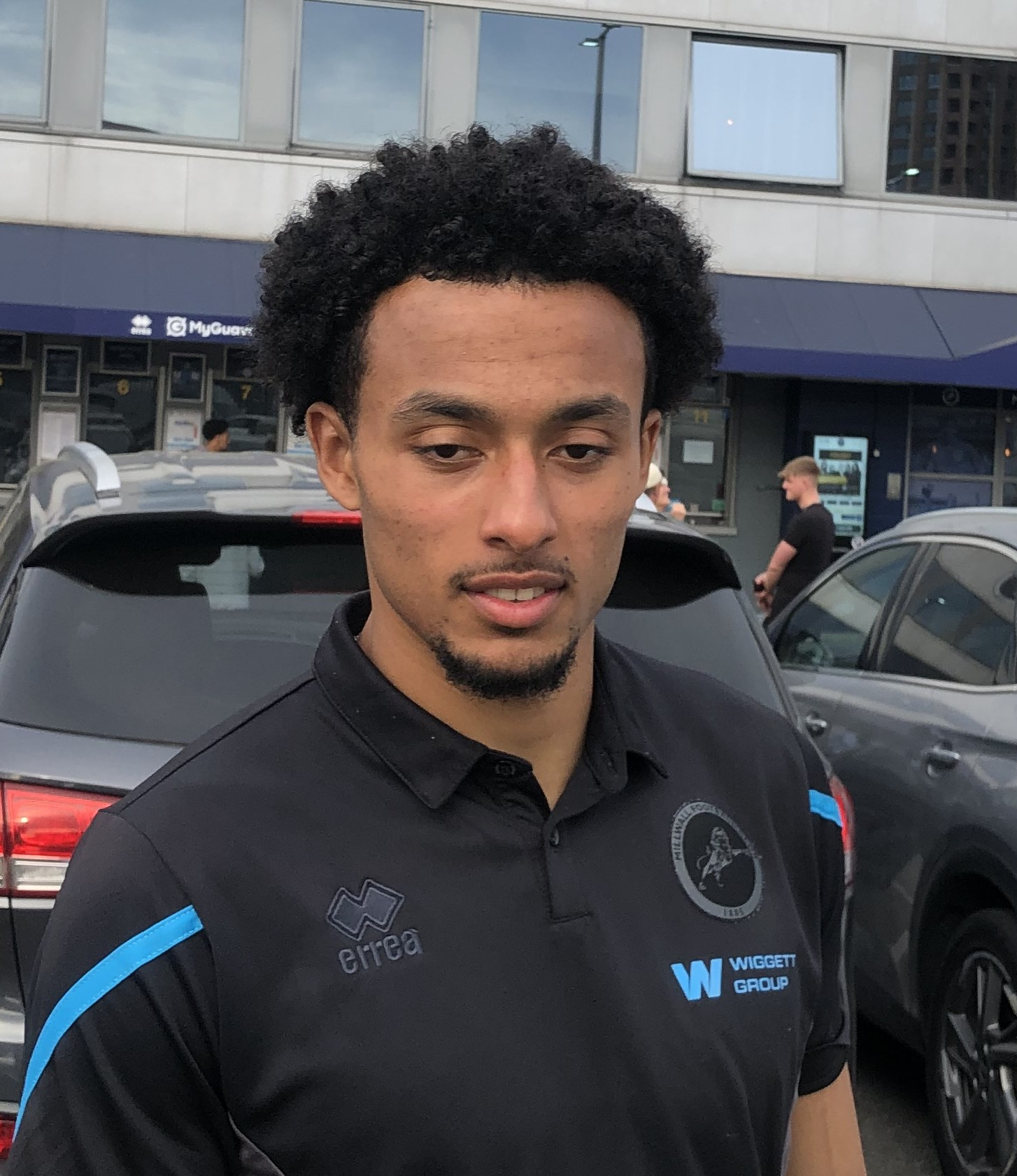
- Azeez in 2025

Personal information
- Full name: Oluwafemi Javier Azeez
- Date of birth: 5 June 2001 (age 25)
- Place of birth: Westminster, England
- Height: 1.81 m (5 ft 11 in)
- Position: Winger

Team information
- Current team: Brighton & Hove Albion
- Number: 39

Youth career
- Watford
- –2018: Northwood

Senior career*
| Years | Team | Apps | (Gls) |
| 2018 | Northwood | 12 | (0) |
| 2018–2019 | Wealdstone | 8 | (0) |
| 2018–2019 | → Hanwell Town (loan) | 3 | (3) |
| 2019–2024 | Reading | 81 | (10) |
| 2020 | → Bracknell Town (loan) | 1 | (0) |
| 2024–2026 | Millwall | 70 | (13) |
| 2026– | Brighton & Hove Albion | 0 | (0) |

International career^{‡}
| 2026– | Nigeria | 2 | (2) |
- * Club domestic league appearances and goals as of 31 August 2026 (UTC) ‡ National team caps and goals as of 20:30, 30 May 2026 (UTC)

Oluwafemi Javier "Femi" Azeez Beloso (born 5 June 2001) is a professional footballer who plays as a winger for Premier League club Brighton & Hove Albion. Born in England, he plays for the Nigeria national team.

After being released from the Watford youth system at age 14, he began his senior career with non-league side Northwood. After making 12 appearances in his debut season, he signed for fellow non-league club Wealdstone in 2018. After his time at Wealdstone, which included a loan at Hanwell Town in 2018, he joined Reading in 2019. He was loaned to Bracknell Town before making his senior debut for Reading in 2021. He became an important part of the team in the 2023–24 season, before signing for Millwall in 2024.

== Club career ==
=== Early career ===
"He took his opportunity with both hands, he came off the bench and played well, so I gave him a start and he just continued to grow. He started the last six games of the season, which is virtually unheard of for a 16-year-old at that level. It doesn't happen."

— Northwood manager Gordon Boateng on Azeez's first team breakthrough.

Azeez joined the youth team of Watford at age nine, but was released at age 14. He later joined the youth side of Northwood following a trial, where he played down the wing and upfront. Interim manager Gordon Boateng was impressed by Azeez while watching him play for the under-18 side, and he handed him his first-team debut aged 16. His debut came in a league match in the eighth tier of English football on 6 February 2018, coming on as a substitute for Jermaine Osei in a 2–0 defeat to Chalfont St Peter. He made his full debut on 21 March 2018, in a 2–0 defeat to Aylesbury United. He ended his debut season with 12 appearances.

Azeez joined National League South side Wealdstone in summer 2018. Azeez was initially signed to play for Wealdstone's youth side, but once against impressed manager Bobby Wilkinson who sent him to train with the first team. He made his debut on 6 November, starting and scoring in a 5–3 win over Uxbridge in the Middlesex Senior Cup. He made his league debut on 1 December in a 3–0 defeat to Eastbourne Borough after coming on as a substitute for David Pratt. Later that month, he signed for Isthmian League South Central Division side Hanwell Town on dual registration. He ended his loan with 4 goals in 4 appearances. He captained Wealdstone in a Middlesex Senior Cup match against Brentford B at age 17, which ended in a 2–0 defeat. He ended the 2018–19 season with 1 goal in 10 appearances for Wealdstone.

=== Reading ===
On 18 September 2019, Reading announced the signing of Azeez to their academy on a one-year professional contract. He initially struggled for the under-23s, failing to score in eight matches in the Premier League 2. As a result, on 8 February 2020, Azeez joined Bracknell Town on an initial 28-day loan deal, reuniting with Wealdstone manager Bobby Wilkinson. He made his debut for 'the Robins' on 11 February, in a 0–0 tie to Maldon & Tiptree in the Isthmian League Cup, which Bracknell won 4–1 on penalties. On 2 July 2020, Reading announced that Azeez had signed a new one-year contract with the club. He made his Reading first-team debut on 6 March 2021, coming on as a substitute for Josh Laurent in a 3–0 win over Sheffield Wednesday. On 2 July, Reading announced that Azeez had signed another one-year contract with the club, after scoring 10 goals to become top scorer of the under-23s.

Azeez was handed his first league start for Reading on 7 August, in a 3–2 defeat to Stoke City. He scored his first goal for Reading, and his first professional goal, in a 2–1 win against Preston North End on 14 August 2021 in what was only his second start and home debut. After finishing the season with 2 goals in 14 appearances, he signed a new two-year deal. In the 2022–23 season, he made 23 appearances without scoring. However, Reading were relegated to EFL League One after receiving a six-point deduction in April.

On 25 November 2023, Azeez assisted both goals in a 1–2 away win against Wycombe Wanderers. This was Reading's first away win in the league for over a year. Three days later, he once again assisted as well as scoring a goal in a 5–1 victory over Carlisle United. He became a vital part of the Reading team in the 2023–24 season, making 52 appearances and scoring 8 goals to help Reading survive in League One.

On 8 May 2024, Reading activated a one-year extension to Azeez's contract, keeping him at the club until the summer of 2025. He missed the first two league matches of the season due to a back injury, making his first appearance of the 2024–25 season in a 2–0 win over Wigan Athletic on 17 August.

=== Millwall ===
On 21 August 2024, Reading confirmed that Azeez had completed a permanent move to Millwall for a substantial undisclosed fee, after scoring 11 times in 89 appearances for the club. He made his Millwall debut on 24 August, in a 0–0 draw to Hull City. On 23 November, Azeez scored his first Millwall goal, coming off the bench to grab an injury-time equaliser in a 1–1 draw against Sunderland.

He was named EFL Championship Player of the Month for February 2026 after five goal contributions in five matches.

=== Brighton & Hove Albion ===
On 2 September 2026, Brighton & Hove Albion announced the signing of Azeez on a four-year contract for a reported initial fee of £12.5 million, with a potential total package in excess of £15 million through performance-related add-ons.

== International career ==
Azeez is eligible to represent Nigeria the country of birth of his father, Spain and France, the nationalities of his mother and England, his country of birth. In May 2026, Azeez received his first call-up to the Nigeria national team, being named in the squad for the 2026 Unity Cup. He made his debut on 26 May 2026, scoring both goals in a 2–0 win over Zimbabwe.

== Personal life ==
Azeez was born in Westminster, London, to a Nigerian father and French-Spanish mother, and grew up in Northwood. Azeez holds both French and Spanish nationalities. His younger brother Miguel is also a professional footballer who plays for National League Team Carlisle United.

== Career statistics ==
=== Club ===
As of match played 15 August 2026

Appearances and goals by club, season and competition
| Club | Season | League | | | FA Cup | | EFL Cup | | Europe | | Other | | Total | |
| Club | Season | Division | Apps | Goals | Apps | Goals | Apps | Goals | Apps | Goals | Apps | Goals | Apps | Goals |
|---|---|---|---|---|---|---|---|---|---|---|---|---|---|---|
| Northwood | 2017–18 | Southern League East Division | 12 | 0 | 0 | 0 | — | | — | | 0 | 0 | 12 | 0 |
| Wealdstone | 2018–19 | National League South | 8 | 0 | 0 | 0 | — | | — | | 2 (Note: Appearances in Middlesex Senior Cup) | 1 | 10 | 1 |
| Hanwell Town (loan) | 2018–19 | Isthmian League South Central Division | 3 | 3 | 0 | 0 | — | | — | | 1 (Note: Appearance in Middlesex Senior Charity Cup) | 1 | 4 | 4 |
| Reading | 2019–20 | Championship | 0 | 0 | 0 | 0 | 0 | 0 | — | | — | | 0 | 0 |
| Reading | 2020–21 | Championship | 1 | 0 | 0 | 0 | 0 | 0 | — | | — | | 1 | 0 |
| Reading | 2021–22 | Championship | 13 | 2 | 1 | 0 | 0 | 0 | — | | — | | 14 | 2 |
| Reading | 2022–23 | Championship | 20 | 0 | 1 | 0 | 0 | 0 | — | | — | | 21 | 0 |
| Reading | 2023–24 | League One | 46 | 8 | 2 | 1 | 1 | 0 | — | | 3 (Note: Appearances in EFL Trophy) | 0 | 52 | 9 |
| Reading | 2024–25 | League One | 1 | 0 | — | | 0 | 0 | — | | 0 | 0 | 1 | 0 |
| Reading | Total | | 81 | 10 | 4 | 1 | 1 | 0 | — | | 3 | 0 | 89 | 11 |
| Bracknell Town (loan) | 2019–20 | Isthmian League South Central Division | 1 | 0 | 0 | 0 | — | | — | | 1 (Note: Appearance in Isthmian League Cup) | 0 | 2 | 0 |
| Millwall | 2024–25 | Championship | 34 | 2 | 3 | 2 | 1 | 0 | — | | — | | 38 | 4 |
| Millwall | 2025–26 | Championship | 35 | 11 | 0 | 0 | 0 | 0 | — | | 2 (Note: Appearances in EFL Championship play-offs) | 0 | 37 | 11 |
| Millwall | 2026–27 | Championship | 1 | 0 | 0 | 0 | 1 | 0 | — | | — | | 2 | 0 |
| Millwall | Total | | 70 | 13 | 3 | 2 | 2 | 0 | — | | 2 | 0 | 77 | 15 |
| Brighton & Hove Albion | 2026–27 | Premier League | 0 | 0 | 0 | 0 | 0 | 0 | 0 | 0 | — | | 0 | 0 |
| Career total | | | 175 | 26 | 7 | 3 | 3 | 0 | 0 | 0 | 9 | 2 | 194 | 31 |

=== International ===
As of match played 30 May 2026

Appearances and goals by national team and year
| National team | Year | Apps | Goals |
|---|---|---|---|
| Nigeria | 2026 | 2 | 2 |
| Total | | 2 | 2 |

Scores and results list Nigeria's goal tally first, score column indicates score after each Azeez goal.

List of international goals scored by Femi Azeez
| No. | Date | Venue | Opponent | Score | Result | Competition |
|---|---|---|---|---|---|---|
| 1 | 26 May 2026 | The Valley, London, England | Zimbabwe | 1–0 | 2–0 | 2026 Unity Cup |
| 2 | 26 May 2026 | The Valley, London, England | Zimbabwe | 2–0 | 2–0 | 2026 Unity Cup |

== Honours ==
Individual

- EFL Championship Player of the Month: February 2026
- EFL Championship Team of the Year: 2025–26
- PFA Team of the Year: 2025–26 Championship
