= George Earthy =

English footballer (born 2004)

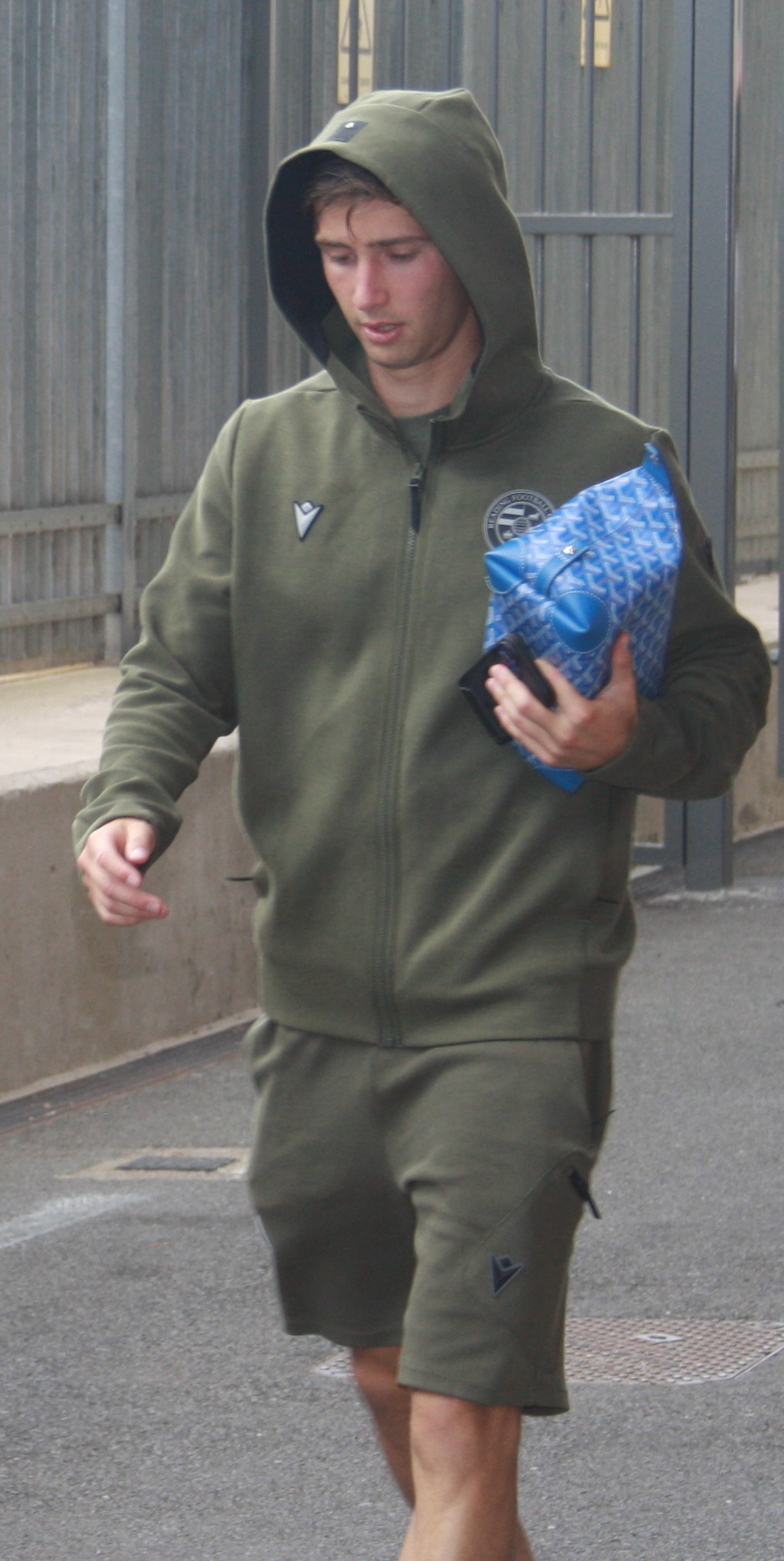
- Earthy with Reading in 2026

Personal information
- Full name: George Robert Earthy
- Date of birth: 5 September 2004 (age 22)
- Place of birth: Havering, England
- Height: 5 ft 11 in (1.80 m)
- Positions: Attacking midfielder; right midfielder

Team information
- Current team: Reading
- Number: 17

Youth career
- 2010–2024: West Ham United

Senior career*
Years	Team	Apps	(Gls)
2024–2026	West Ham United	4	(1)
2024–2025	→ Bristol City (loan)	37	(3)
2026	→ Bristol City (loan)	10	(0)
2026–	Reading	5	(2)

International career^{‡}
2019	England U15	1	(0)
2019	England U16	3	(0)
2024	England U20	3	(0)
2024–	England U21	2	(0)
- * Club domestic league appearances and goals as of 13:51 22 September 2026 (UTC) ‡ National team caps and goals as of 19:45, 7 December 2024 (UTC)

George Robert Earthy (born 5 September 2004) is an English professional footballer who plays as an attacking midfielder or right midfielder for EFL League One club Reading.

== Club career ==
=== West Ham United ===
Earthy joined West Ham United at under-6 level, later signing his first professional contract with the club at the age of 17 in June 2022. He was part of the West Ham under-18 side that won an FA Youth Cup and U18 Premier League South double during the 2022–23 season. On 14 March 2024, he made his first team debut for West Ham, coming on as a late substitute in a 5–0 win against Freiburg in the UEFA Europa League round of 16.

On 14 April 2024, Earthy later made his Premier League debut in a game against Fulham coming on as an 82nd minute substitute for Michail Antonio. After only a few minutes he was in a collision with team-mate Edson Álvarez. He lost consciousness after his head hit the ground resulting in lengthy medical assistance including receiving oxygen, before being stretchered off to be substituted by Maxwel Cornet as West Ham lost 2–0. A statement from West Ham, the following day, said Earthy had been discharged from hospital and had returned home. On 11 May 2024, Earthy made his return to the West Ham side, scoring with his first touch, 67 seconds after his introduction as a substitute, in West Ham's 3–1 win against Luton Town. Following the game, Earthy was presented with the West Ham's Mark Noble Young Hammer of the Year award.

==== Bristol City (loan) ====
On 14 August 2024, Earthy joined EFL Championship club Bristol City on a season long loan. He made his Bristol City debut on 17 August. Coming on as a late substitute, two minutes later he played a key role in the winning goal as City beat Millwall 4–3. At the end of the season he was voted Bristol City's Young Player of the Year.

==== Return to Bristol City (loan) ====
On 9 January 2026, Earthy rejoined Bristol City on loan until the end of the 2025–26 season, after limited first-team opportunities with West Ham United in the Premier League.

=== Reading ===
On 19 August 2026, Earthy joined Reading on a permanent transfer for an undisclosed fee, signing a three-year contract.

== International career ==
Earthy has represented England at under-15 and under-16 level.

On 7 June 2024, Earthy made his England U20 debut during a 2–1 win over Sweden at Stadion ŠRC Sesvete.

On 15 November 2024, Earthy made his U21 debut as a substitute during a goalless draw with Spain in La Línea de la Concepción.

== Career statistics ==
As of match played 19 September 2026

Appearances and goals by club, season and competition
Club	Season	League			FA Cup		EFL Cup		Europe		Other		Total	
Club	Season	Division	Apps	Goals	Apps	Goals	Apps	Goals	Apps	Goals	Apps	Goals	Apps	Goals
West Ham United U21	2022–23	—			—		—		—		3 (Note: Appearances in EFL Trophy)	0	3	0
West Ham United U21	2023–24	—			—		—		—		5	3	5	3
West Ham United U21	2025–26	—			—		—		—		3	2	3	2
West Ham United U21	Total		—		—		—		—		11	5	11	5
West Ham United	2023–24	Premier League	3	1	0	0	0	0	1 (Note: Appearance in UEFA Europa League)	0	—		4	1
West Ham United	2025–26	Premier League	1	0	—		0	0	—		—		1	0
West Ham United	Total		4	1	0	0	0	0	1	0	—		5	1
Bristol City (loan)	2024–25	EFL Championship	37	3	1	0	—		—		2 (Note: Appearances in EFL Championship play-offs)	0	40	3
Bristol City (loan)	2025–26	EFL Championship	10	0	1	0	—		—		—		11	0
Bristol City (loan)	Total		47	3	2	0	—		—		2	0	51	3
Reading	2026–27	EFL League One	5	2	0	0	2	0	—		0	0	7	2
Career total			56	6	2	0	2	0	1	0	13	5	74	11

== Honours ==
West Ham United U18

- FA Youth Cup: 2022–23
- U18 Premier League South: 2023

Individual

- West Ham United Young Player of the Year: 2023–24
- Bristol City Young Player of the Year: 2024–25
