= 2023–24 West Ham United F.C. season =

English football team season

West Ham United
2023–24 season
- Owners: David Sullivan (38.8%); Daniel Křetínský (27%); Vanessa Gold (25.1%); Albert 'Tripp' Smith (8%); Other investors (1.1%)
- Co-chairman: David Sullivan; Vanessa Gold
- Manager: David Moyes
- Stadium: London Stadium
- Premier League: 9th
- FA Cup: Third round
- EFL Cup: Quarter-finals
- UEFA Europa League: Quarter-finals
- Top goalscorer: League: Jarrod Bowen (16); All: Jarrod Bowen (20)
- Highest home attendance: 62,477 v Bristol City (7 January 2024, FA Cup 3rd round)
- Lowest home attendance: 41,374 v TSC (21 September 2023, UEL)
- Biggest win: 5–0 v SC Freiburg (14 March 2024, UEL)
- Biggest defeat: 0–6 v Arsenal (11 February 2024, PL)
Home colours	Away colours	Third colours

The 2023–24 season was the 129th season in the history of West Ham United and their twelfth consecutive season in the Premier League. In addition to the domestic league, the club competed in the FA Cup, the EFL Cup and the UEFA Europa League.

On 15 July 2023, captain Declan Rice left the club and signed for Arsenal for £105 million, a record fee between two British clubs.

== Season summary ==
=== Start of season ===
==== August ====
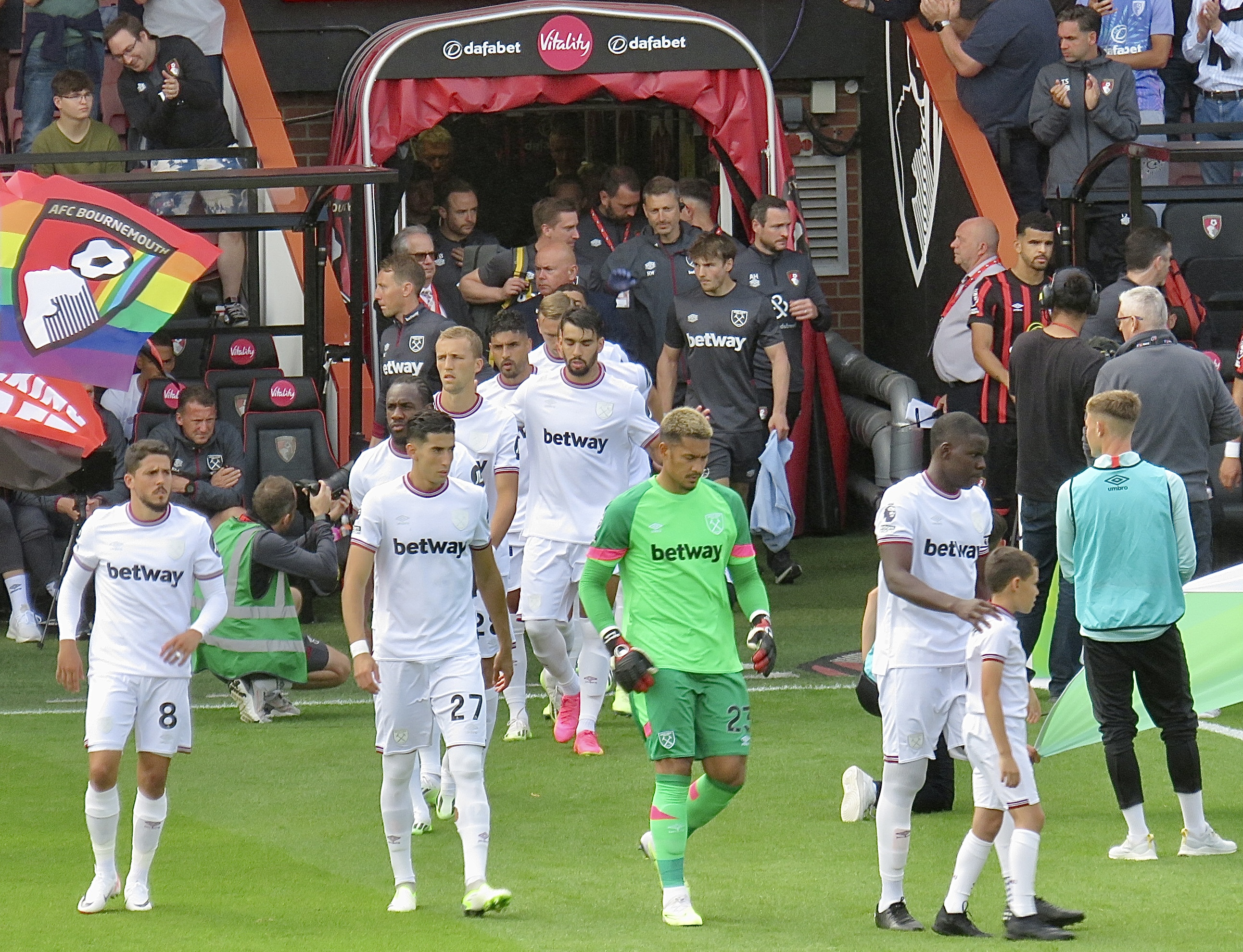
West Ham players enter the pitch at the Vitality Stadium for the first game of the season, against AFC Bournemouth.

West Ham started their Premier League season against AFC Bournemouth at the Vitality Stadium on 12 August 2023. Jarrod Bowen scored the opening goal, a long-range strike into the top left corner from outside the box, in the 51st minute. Towards the end of the match, Dominic Solanke turned in a wayward effort from Antoine Semenyo to equalise for Bournemouth. The match finished in a 1–1 draw.

West Ham then played their first London derby of the season against Chelsea at London Stadium on 20 August. Debutant James Ward-Prowse assisted Nayef Aguerd's opener in the 7th minute with a corner delivered into the box to put the Hammers ahead. Chelsea responded through Carney Chukwuemeka in the 28th minute to level the game. The Blues were then awarded a penalty by referee John Brooks after Tomáš Souček fouled Raheem Sterling in the box. Enzo Fernández took the penalty, which was saved by Alphonse Areola. In the second half, Ward-Prowse earned a second assist after sending the ball through to Michail Antonio, who shot it past Robert Sánchez and into the bottom-left corner to put the Hammers back ahead. In the 67th minute, Nayef Aguerd was sent off after being shown a second yellow card for a bad foul on Nicolas Jackson. Despite being down to ten men, West Ham held onto their lead and were awarded a penalty after Moisés Caicedo fouled Emerson in the box in added time. Lucas Paquetá scored the penalty to seal the victory for the Hammers in the 90+5th minute. The match finished 3–1 to West Ham in their first win of the season.

West Ham then played Brighton & Hove Albion at the Falmer Stadium on 26 August. Though Brighton dominated the early stages of the game, in the 19th minute Michail Antonio took advantage of a defensive error from Adam Webster and crossed the ball to James Ward-Prowse, who scored his first goal for West Ham and his 50th Premier League goal overall. In the second half, the Hammers scored two goals in five minutes to extend their lead, first through Jarrod Bowen in the 58th minute and then through Michail Antonio in the 63rd minute. Brighton pegged West Ham back late on through Pascal Groß, but the Hammers held on and the match finished 3–1 to West Ham in their first ever Premier League victory against Brighton. The win placed West Ham above Tottenham Hotspur on goals scored at the top of the table.

==== September ====
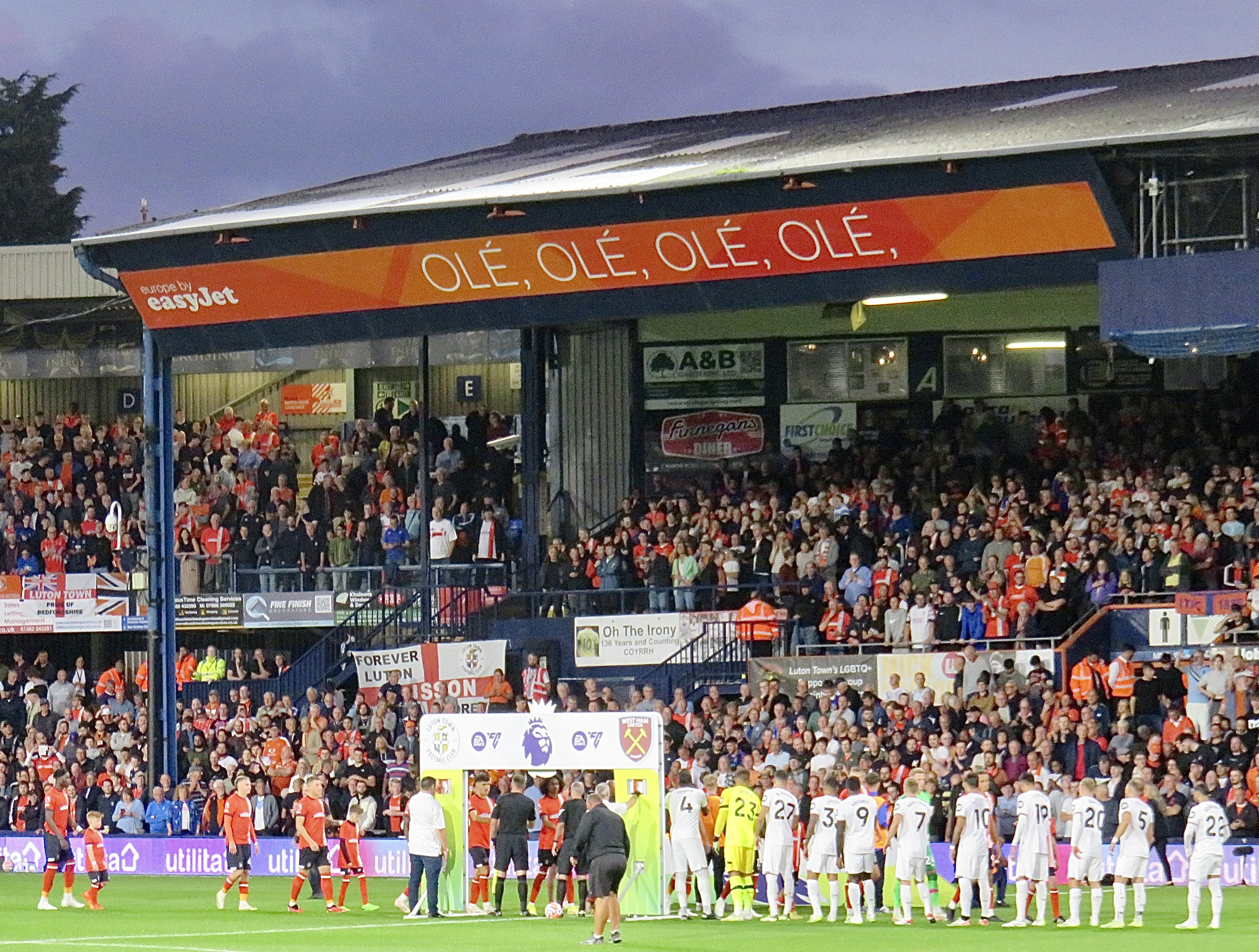
Luton Town and West Ham players line up at Kenilworth Road before the game.

On 1 September, West Ham played newly promoted Luton Town at Kenilworth Road in the first ever Premier League match to be held at the stadium. The Hammers opened the scoring through Jarrod Bowen, whose header off a Lucas Paquetá delivery deflected into the net off of goalkeeper Thomas Kaminski in the 37th minute. The second West Ham goal came through captain Kurt Zouma, who headed in a corner delivery from James Ward-Prowse in the 85th minute. Mads Juel Andersen scored Luton's first ever Premier League home goal in added time but the match finished 2–1 to West Ham. The win placed West Ham at the top of the table above Manchester City at the start of the matchweek.

During the international break, ten West Ham players were called up to represent their national teams. Four players were called up for UEFA Euro 2024 qualifying: Vladimír Coufal and Tomáš Souček for the Czech Republic, Alphonse Areola for France and Konstantinos Mavropanos for Greece, another four players were called up for 2023 AFCON qualifiers: Saïd Benrahma for Algeria, Mohammed Kudus for Ghana, Nayef Aguerd for Morocco and Maxwel Cornet for Ivory Coast. Striker Michail Antonio was called up by Jamaica to participate in CONCACAF Nations League matches, whilst midfielder Edson Álvarez was called up by Mexico for international friendlies.

On 16 September, West Ham played the defending League and European champions Manchester City at London Stadium. The Hammers struck first in the 36th minute as Vladimír Coufal's cross was headed in by James Ward-Prowse. City struck back almost immediately after half time through Jérémy Doku before Bernardo Silva and Erling Haaland added to the scoreline in the 76th and 86th minutes respectively. The match finished 3–1 to City in West Ham's first loss of the season. Manager David Moyes praised his team despite the loss and commented that "we’re talking about the champions of the major European competition and the champions of the Premier League and they’re really hard to beat, really hard".

West Ham played their first group stage game of the 2023–24 Europa League on 21 September at home to Serbian team TSC Bačka Topola. A defensive error by Angelo Ogbonna in the 47th minute allowed Petar Stanić to rob him of possession before running on to score past Łukasz Fabiański. West Ham responded with two goals from Mohammed Kudus, his first for the club, in the 66th and 70th minute before Tomáš Souček added a third in the 82nd minute as the game finished 3–1. Kudus' first goal in the 66th minute was originally ruled an own goal by Nemanja Petrović, but was retroactively awarded to Kudus by UEFA the next day.

West Ham then returned to the Premier League to play Liverpool at Anfield on 24 September. Liverpool were awarded a penalty by referee Chris Kavanagh after Nayef Aguerd tripped up Mohamed Salah in the box. Salah took the penalty and sent Alphonse Areola the wrong way to put the Reds ahead in the 16th minute. The Hammers equalised a few minutes before half-time as Vladimír Coufal's cross was headed in by Jarrod Bowen. In the second half, goals from Darwin Núñez and Diogo Jota put Liverpool further ahead. The match finished 3–1 to Liverpool in West Ham's second consecutive loss in the league.

On 27 September, the Hammers played Lincoln City in the third round of the EFL Cup at the Sincil Bank. West Ham made 10 changes to the side that lost 3–1 to Liverpool with only Tomáš Souček retaining his place. West Ham won the match with a single goal from Souček in the 70th minute. The game was affected by poor weather conditions due to Storm Agnes. In the fourth round draw later that day, West Ham were drawn at home to Arsenal for the next round.

Returning to the London Stadium on 30 September, West Ham played Sheffield United in the Premier League in what was manager David Moyes’ 900th league match as a manager. West Ham won the game 2–0 with first-half goals from Jarrod Bowen and Tomáš Souček.

==== October ====
On 5 October, West Ham played their second Europa League game, against Freiburg at the Europa-Park Stadion. Lucas Paquetá scored in the 8th minute from a cross by Jarrod Bowen. In the 49th minute Freiburg equalised when Roland Sallai hit a close-range shot. Nayef Aguerd headed in a James Ward-Prowse corner past goalkeeper Noah Atubolu to make it 2–1 to West Ham, the final score. By winning they became the first English side to go 17 consecutive games in European competition without defeat.

On 8 October, West Ham played Newcastle United at the London Stadium. Tomáš Souček scored in the 8th minute but Alexander Isak scored two goals in five minutes in the second half to give Newcastle a 2–1 lead. Substitute Mohammed Kudus scored in the 89th minute as the game finished in a 2–2 draw.

During the October international break, four West Ham players were called up to feature in UEFA Euro 2024 qualifying matches: Jarrod Bowen for England, Konstantinos Mavropanos for Greece and Vladimír Coufal and Tomáš Souček, both for the Czech Republic. Outside of Europe, Nayef Aguerd was called up to participate in AFCON qualifiers for Morocco and Michail Antonio was selected by Jamaica to participate in CONCACAF Nations League matches. Another three players were called up for international friendlies: Edson Álvarez for Mexico, Mohammed Kudus for Ghana and Saïd Benrahma for Algeria. Álvarez's Mexico and Kudus' Ghana played each other in a friendly on 14 October, with Mexico winning 2–0.

West Ham played Aston Villa in the Premier League at Villa Park on 22 October. Douglas Luiz put Villa ahead in the 30th minute, the only goal of the first half. He scored their second goal, a penalty in the 52nd minute after Ezri Konsa had been fouled. Jarrod Bowen pulled one back for West Ham in the 56th minute but Ollie Watkins and Leon Bailey made it 4–1, the final score. Bowen's goal was the fifth successive away game in which he had scored, a feat only previously achieved in the Premier League by Thierry Henry and Mohamed Salah.

On 26 October, West Ham played Greek team, Olympiacos at the Karaiskakis Stadium in Piraeus in the Europa League. Kostas Fortounis scored for Olympiacos in the 32nd minute and Rodinei’s shot deflected off of Angelo Ogbonna in the first minute of added-time to make the score 2–0 at half time. Although Lucas Paquetá scored in the 87th minute, West Ham lost 2–1.

Returning to the Premier League, West Ham played Everton at the London Stadium on 29 October. Respects were paid before the game to Everton chairman Bill Kenwright and Manchester United and England legend Bobby Charlton, who had both recently died. Everton won the game 1–0 with a shot from Dominic Calvert-Lewin from the edge of the box in the 52nd minute. Failing to score in a Premier League game at the London Stadium for the first time in 2023, West Ham ended a run of 14 consecutive home games with a goal.

==== November ====
Arsenal were the visitors to the London Stadium on 1 November for a fourth round tie in the EFL cup. West Ham scored first, in the 16th minute, thanks to an own goal from Ben White. Mohammed Kudus added a second in the 50th minute and Jarrod Bowen a third in the 60th minute. Although Martin Ødegaard scored in the sixth minute of added time, this was only a consolation as West Ham won 3–1. The fixture also featured the first game at the London Stadium for Arsenal for former West Ham captain, Declan Rice who received a mixed reception from home supporters.

On 4 November, West Ham travelled to the Brentford Community Stadium to play Brentford. Neal Maupay put the hosts ahead in the 11th minute. However, Mohammed Kudus scored in the 19th minute acrobatically meeting Michail Antonio's cross with a bicycle kick. Jarrod Bowen added a second in the 26th minute, breaking the Premier League record to score in the first six successive away games of a season and become the first West Ham United player to score in six straight away appearances, as the first half finished 2–1 to West Ham. On 55 minutes Konstantinos Mavropanos put through his own goal before Nathan Collins made in 3–2 to Brentford, the final score, in the 69th minute. West Ham dropped to 11th in the league.

On 9 November, West Ham played the return-leg in the Europa League, against Olympiacos at the London Stadium. In a game described as drab, Lucas Paquetá scored the only goal in the 73rd minute from a James Ward-Prowse cross. The 1–0 win put West Ham back on top of their group table with nine points, ahead of Freiburg.

Three days later, on 12 November, West Ham hosted Nottingham Forest in the Premier League. In the third minute a mistake by Forest's Nicolás Domínguez was exploited by Lucas Paquetá who took one touch before shooting past Forest 'keeper Odysseas Vlachodimos. Forest equalised in the 44th minute when Taiwo Awoniyi scored after Alphonse Areola pushed Morgan Gibbs-White's shot into his path. Anthony Elanga put Forest ahead in the 63rd minute but less than two minutes later, Jarrod Bowen equalised with a header from a James Ward-Prowse corner. In the 88th minute, Tomáš Souček headed in another Ward-Prowse corner to put West Ham 3–2 up, the final score. West Ham moved up to 9th in the league. The victory was manager David Moyes 100th at West Ham across his two spells in charge.

On 25 November, West Ham travelled to Turf Moor to play Burnley in the Premier League. In the 49th minute Jay Rodriguez scored a penalty for Burnley after Mohammed Kudus had fouled Luca Koleosho in the box. In the 86th-minute substitute Divin Mubama pressurised Dara O'Shea into deflecting the ball into the Burnley net from a Kudus cross and in the first minute of added time, another Kudus cross was met by Tomáš Souček to make it 2–1, the final score.

On 30 November, West Ham played the return leg in the Europa League against TSC Bačka Topola in Serbia. Manager Moyes made seven changes from their Premier League win at Burnley on 25 November. Injuries to both Jarrod Bowen and Michail Antonio and to Mohammed Kudus kept them out of the squad. In a slow and ponderous performance, West Ham won 1–0 with the only goal coming from Tomáš Souček in the 89th minute. The win secured West Ham their place in the Europa League knockout stage.

==== December ====
Crystal Palace were the visitors to the London Stadium for a Premier League game on 3 December. Mohammed Kudus put West Ham 1-0 up in the 13th minute but a poor backpass by Konstantinos Mavropanos was intercepted by Odsonne Édouard in the 53rd minute to make it 1–1, the final score. On 7 December, West Ham travelled to the Tottenham Hotspur Stadium to play Tottenham Hotspur in the Premier League. Cristian Romero put the hosts 1–0 up in the 11 minute with a header. However Jarrod Bowen's 52nd-minute equaliser was followed in the 74th minute by a second for West Ham, from James Ward-Prowse. West Ham held on for a 2–1 win in what manager Moyes described as "one of the biggest wins I've had in football." On 10 December, West Ham played Fulham at Craven Cottage. The hosts were 3–0 ahead by half-time thanks to goals from Raúl Jiménez, Willian and Tosin. Harry Wilson and Carlos Vinícius added two more in the second half to make the final score 5–0. Manager Moyes blamed the result on the exertion spent in the previous game saying, "mentally and physically we found it tough". On 14 December, West Ham played the home leg against Freiburg. First half goals from Mohammed Kudus and Edson Álvarez put West Ham 2–0 up. No further goals were added in the second half as West Ham won their group table and qualified for the Round of 16. On 17 December, West Ham played Wolverhampton Wanderers in the Premier League at the London Stadium. They won 3–0 with two goals from Mohammed Kudus and one from Jarrod Bowen as they moved up to 8th in the table.

On 20 December West Ham travelled to Liverpool for a quarter-final game in the EFL Cup. Dominik Szoboszlai scored in the 28th minute to make the score 1–0, as it was at half-time. However, a dominant Liverpool scored four more in the second-half with two from Curtis Jones and goals from Cody Gakpo and Mohamed Salah. Jarrod Bowen scored for West Ham as the game finished 5–1. Making six changes to the game against Wolves on 17 December, West Ham offered little goal threat and seemed unable to string a series of passes together. West Ham returned to the Premier League on 23 December to play Manchester United at the London Stadium. In a game described by the BBC as "drab" it was not until the 72nd minute that Jarrod Bowen bundled the ball past André Onana from a Lucas Paquetá pass to make it 1–0. They added a second in the 78th minute when Mohammed Kudus picked up the ball from a defensive error by Kobbie Mainoo and drilled the ball past Onana to make it 2–0, the final score. West Ham moved up to sixth in the league, leapfrogging Manchester United.

On 28 December, West Ham played Arsenal in the Premier League at the Emirates Stadium. Tomáš Souček scored in the 14th minute from a cut-back by Jarrod Bowen. Despite claims that the ball had gone out of play, there was insufficient video evidence for VAR to rule out the goal. Former Arsenal player, Konstantinos Mavropanos added a second, his first for the club, in the 55th minute from a header. Former West Ham player, Declan Rice gave away a penalty towards the end of the game but Arsenal goalkeeper David Raya saved the Saïd Benrahma spot-kick. Despite have only three shots on target the whole game, the Hammers held out for a win keeping them in 6th place in the table.

==== January ====
In a game affected by Storm Henk, West Ham played Brighton at the London Stadium in the Premier League on 2 January. The game finished 0–0 in a "largely dour" game as West Ham kept their fourth consecutive clean sheet. Brighton had 68% possession with 22 shots to West Ham's six leaving manager Moyes to say his club were fortunate to claim a point from the game. On 7 January, West Ham entered the FA Cup in the third round playing Bristol City at the London Stadium. Although Jarrod Bowen scored in the 4th minute they could not hold on for a win as Tommy Conway equalised in the 61st minute to make it 1–1, the final score. 9,000 City fans attended the game which was taken to a replay at Ashton Gate on 16 January. In that replay West Ham were eliminated from the FA Cup as Bristol City won 1–0. Tommy Conway was again the scorer as he picked up a loose back pass by Konstantinos Mavropanos to score in the third minute. Saïd Benrahma was sent-off in the second half for kicking out at an opponent.

Returning to play in the Premier League, on 21 January, West Ham travelled to Bramall Lane to play Sheffield United. Maxwel Cornet scored in the 28th minute, his first for the club, only for Ben Brereton Díaz to equalize in the 44th minute. Following a foul in the box on Danny Ings by Gustavo Hamer, James Ward-Prowse scored the resulting penalty to put West Ham 2–1 up in the 79th minute. In the seventh minute of added time Vladimir Coufal was sent-off for a second bookable offence and in the eighth minute of added time, Alphonse Areola fouled Oli McBurnie in the box. McBurnie scored the resulting penalty in the 13th minute of added time, the latest a Premier League goal has ever been scored, to make the score 2–2 the final score. West Ham remained 6th in the league table.

==== February ====
West Ham played host to Bournemouth in the Premier League on 1 February. After an error in the 3rd minute with new loan signing, Kalvin Phillips passing the ball to Dominic Solanke to shoot past Alphonse Areola, the score was 0–1 at half time. After Mohammed Kudus was fouled in the box, James Ward-Prowse scored the resulting penalty in the 61st minute to make it 1–1, the final score. West Ham remained in sixth place having failed to win any of their first five games in a calendar year for the first time since 2010. On 4 February, West Ham played Manchester United at Old Trafford in the Premier League. Rasmus Højlund scored for the home side in the 23rd minute with Alejandro Garnacho scoring twice in the second half to make it 3–0, the final score. West Ham dropped to seventh place, below Manchester United.

On 11 February, West Ham suffered their biggest Premier League home defeat and joint heaviest defeat of all time, along with an 8–2 to Blackburn Rovers in season 1963–64. Playing Arsenal at the London Stadium, West Ham lost 6–0. Arsenal's goals were scored by William Saliba in 32nd minute, a Bukayo Saka penalty in the 41st minute, Gabriel in the 44th minute and Leandro Trossard in the second minute of added time in the first half. Saka scored his second in the 63rd minute before former West Ham captain, Declan Rice scored the sixth and final goal in the 65th minute. With the team 4–0 down at half time, thousands of supporters left early in a game described by manager Moyes as "one of the most disappointing days in charge of West Ham." West Ham dropped to eighth in the table West Ham travelled to the City Ground on 17 December to play Nottingham Forest in the Premier League with Michail Antonio playing his first game since mid-November. Taiwo Awoniyi scored for the home side just before half-time with Callum Hudson-Odoi adding a second in the 94th minute to make the final score 2–0. Loan signing Kalvin Phillips was sent-off in the 71st minute following two yellow cards. A section of the West Ham supporters displayed a banner reading "Moyes Out" in the away end.

On 26 February, West Ham played host to Brentford in the Premier League. Jarrod Bowen scored in both the fifth and seventh minute only for Neal Maupay to make the score 2–1 on 12 minutes, as it was at half-time. Bowen completed his hat–trick in the 63rd minute with Emerson adding a fourth with a shot from outside the box. Yoane Wissa made it 4–2 on 82 minutes, the final score. Bowen’s hat-trick was his career first and the first by a West Ham player in the Premier League at the London Stadium. West Ham moved back up into eighth position in the table.

==== March ====
On 2 March, West Ham travelled to Goodison Park to play Everton in the Premier League. Just before half-time, Everton were awarded a penalty following a handball by Kurt Zouma. Beto’s spot-kick was saved by Alphonse Areola and the score was 0–0 at half time. Beto scored for Everton in the 56th minute only for Kurt Zouma to equalise in the 62nd minute. In the first minute of added time, Tomáš Souček controlled a high cross-field pass in the corner of the box before hitting a swerving shot with his instep passed Everton goalkeeper, Jordan Pickford to make it 2–1. In the 95th minute, West Ham broke from the halfway line and Edson Álvarez with his first Premier League goal, finished Jarrod Bowen’s pass to make it 3–1, and the final score. West Ham moved up to 7th in the league. On 7 March, West Ham travelled to Germany to play Freiburg in the Round of 16 in the Europa League. They lost by 1–0 after Freiburg's Michael Gregoritsch scored in the 81st minute.

Burnley were the visitors to the London Stadium on 10 March for a Premier League game. Bottom of the league table at the time, they took the lead in the 11th minute with a goal from Datro Fofana. Their lead was increased to 2–0 just before half-time when Konstantinos Mavropanos scored an own goal. Within 30 seconds of the second half, Lucas Paquetá scored for West Ham. Danny Ings, on as a substitute, equalised in the 91st minute as the game finished 2–2.

On 14 March, the return leg of the Europa League tie against Freiburg was played at the London Stadium. In the 9th minute, Lucas Paquetá brought the tie level with a goal from a cross by Tomáš Souček. Jarrod Bowen scored in the 32nd minute to make it 2–1 on aggregate. Aaron Cresswell scored in the 52nd minute, his first goal in European competition, to make it 3–1. On 77 minutes, Mohammed Kudus picked up the ball in his own half, went past three defenders and shot past the Freiburg goalkeeper to make it 4–0. He added another on 85 minutes to make it 5–0 on the night and 5–1 on aggregate. Midfielder, George Earthy made his professional debut in the game coming on in the 86th minute for Jarrod Bowen. The 5–0 win was West Ham’s biggest win in European competitions.

West Ham returned to Premier League action on 17 March playing Aston Villa at the London Stadium. Michail Antonio scored for West Ham in the 29th minute, a diving header from a Vladimir Coufal cross. Villa equalised in the 79th minute through Nicolò Zaniolo and the game finished 1–1. West Ham had two goals ruled out during the game following VAR reviews. (Note: West Ham had a total of three apparent goals ruled out during the course of the match; however, only two of these goals were ruled out following VAR reviews.) The latter VAR review, for a possible handball by Tomáš Souček, broke the Premier League record for the longest time taken to complete at five minutes and 37 seconds.

After an international break, West Ham returned to Premier League action on 30 March with an away game against Newcastle United. Alexander Isak scored a penalty for the home side on six minutes after a foul on Anthony Gordon. However Michail Antonio equalised on 21 minutes. Goals either side of half-time by Mohammed Kudus and Jarrod Bowen put West Ham 3–1 up. On 69 minutes manager Moyes substituted Antonio for Kalvin Phillips who was adjudged to have fouled Gordon resulting in a further penalty which Isak scored in the 77h minute. On 83 minutes, substitute Harvey Barnes made the score 3-3. He scored again in the 90th minute to make it 4–3, the final score. Moyes received criticism for adopting defensive tactics when 3–1 ahead. Kalvin Phillips was also involved in controversy when, after the game he was verbally abused and called "useless" by a group of West Ham supporters outside the ground. He responded by giving them the finger as he entered the team coach.

==== April ====
West Ham played Tottenham Hotspur in the Premier League at the London Stadium on 2 April. Brennan Johnson put the visitors 1–0 up on five minutes. However Kurt Zouma equalised on 19 minutes from a Jarrod Bowen corner. There was no further score. West Ham remained in 7th place in the league table. On 6 April, West Ham travelled to Molineux to play Wolverhampton Wanderers in the Premier League. Wolves led 1–0 at half-time following a penalty scored by Pablo Sarabia after Emerson had fouled Rayan Ait Nouri. Lucas Paquetá equalised in the 73rd minute with a penalty after Max Kilman had handled the ball. On 84 minutes, James Ward-Prowse scored direct from a corner kick to put the Hammers 2–1 up. In the 99th minute Kilman headed in for what was thought to be an equaliser only for a VAR review to show that Tawanda Chirewa was in an offside position. This decision led to protests by Wolves players and staff leading to several bookings by the referee as the game ended 2–1 to West Ham. In 11 April, Wolves manager Gary O'Neil was charged by the Football Association with "improper and/or threatening" behaviour relating to language used to match officials after the game.

On 11 April, West Ham played Bundesliga leaders Bayer Leverkusen in Germany in the first leg of the quarter-final of the Europa League. West Ham played a defensive game, attempting to score on the break. They held out until the 83rd minute when Jonas Hofmann scored for Leverkusen. Victor Boniface added a second in the 91st minute to make the final score 2–0.

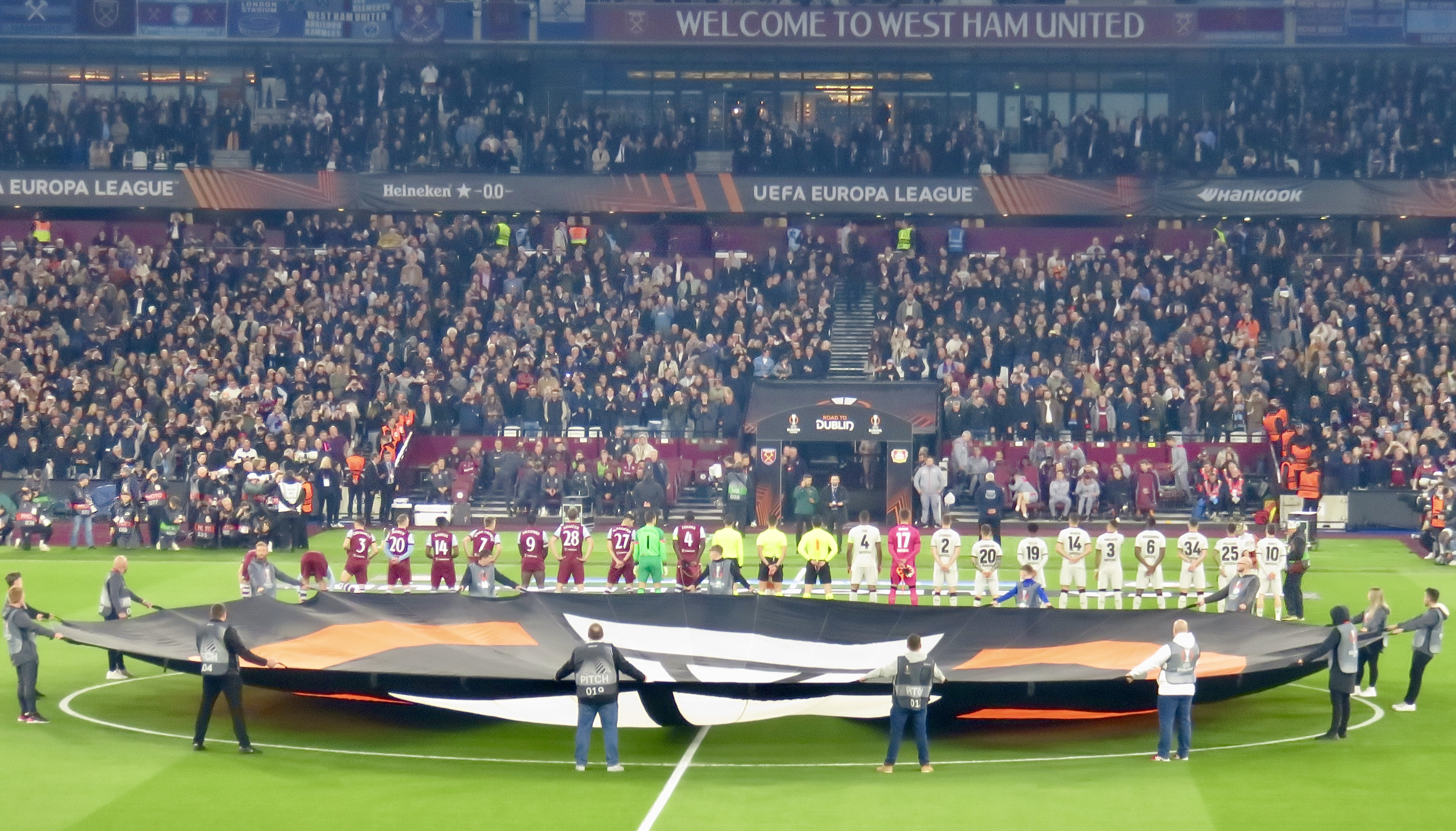
West Ham and Bayer Leverkusen line up before their game at the London Stadium

Returning to the Premier League, West Ham played Fulham at the London Stadium on 14 April. They lost 2–0, both Fulham’s goals being scored by Andreas Pereira, in the 9th and 72nd minute. Midfielder George Earthy made his Premier League debut coming on as an 82nd minute substitute for Michail Antonio. After only a few minutes he was in a collision with team-mate Edson Álvarez. He lost consciousness after his head hit the ground resulting in lengthy medical assistance including receiving oxygen, before being stretchered off to be substituted by Maxwel Cornet. A statement from West Ham, the following day, said Earthy had been discharged from hospital and had returned home. West Ham dropped to 8th position in the league table.

The second leg of the Europa League quarter-final against Bayer Leverkusen was played at the London Stadium on 18 April. West Ham took the lead with a header from Michail Antonio in the 13th minute. They dominated the opening period but in the second-half looked tired. Leverkusen’s Jeremie Frimpong equalised in the 89th minute with a shot which deflected in off of Aaron Cresswell. The game finished 1–1 and 3–1 on aggregate as West Ham were eliminated from the competition.

On 21 April West Ham played Crystal Palace at Selhurst Park in the Premier League. After 31 minutes they were 4–0 down with Palace goals being scored by Michael Olise (seven minutes), Eberechi Eze (16 minutes), an own goal by Emerson (20 minutes) and a goal by Jean-Philippe Mateta (31 minutes). Michail Antonio pulled one back on 40 minutes to make the score 4–1 at half-time. Mateta scored a second on 64 minutes and Palace goalkeeper, Dean Henderson scored an own goal on 89 minutes as the game finished 5–2. Manager Moyes was critical of his team saying, "I've got to say I've not had many teams who have played like that in my whole career".

Liverpool were the visitors to the London Stadium on 27 April for a game in the Premier League. Jarrod Bowen put West Ham ahead just before half-time scoring with a header from Mohammed Kudus' cross. Liverpool improved in the second half and equalised in the 48th minute through Andy Robertson. They went ahead in the 65th minute when Cody Gakpo’s cross ricocheted into the net via Tomáš Souček, Angelo Ogbonna and finally, goalkeeper Alphonse Areola. Michail Antonio equalised in the 77th minute with a header. The game finished 2–2 leaving West Ham in eighth place in the league. Bowen's goal was his 16th Premier League goal of the season, equalling a record held by Paolo Di Canio for the most goals scored by a West Ham player in a season in the Premier League.

==== May ====
On 5 May, West Ham played Chelsea at Stamford Bridge in the Premier League. Cole Palmer puts the hosts 1–0 up on 15 minutes. Conor Gallagher added a second on 30 minutes and Noni Madueke headed in a third on 36 minutes. Nicolas Jackson scored two in the second half, in the 48th and 80th minutes as the game ended 5–0 to Chelsea. This was the fourth time this season that West Ham had conceded five goals. Having won once in the previous 10 games their defensive record, having conceded 70 goals was the fourth worst in the league only beaten by the three teams in the relegation positions, Sheffield United, Burnley and Luton Town.

On 6 May 2024, West Ham confirmed that manager David Moyes would leave the club at the end of his current contract, at the end of the 2023–24 season.

West Ham played their final home game of the season on 11 May, against Luton Town. Albert Sambi Lokonga scored after only six minutes to make it 1–0 to Luton, the score at half–time. James Ward-Prowse equalised on 54 minutes and Tomáš Souček scored a 25 yards (23 m) first–time volley to make it 2–1. On 75 minutes, Michail Antonio was substituted for George Earthy. With his first touch of the game and only 67 seconds later, Earthy scored to make it 3–1, the final score. Kaelan Casey came on as a late substitute, for Angelo Ogbonna, to make his Premier League debut. The result left West Ham in ninth position in the league.

With one game remaining in the season, West Ham’s final league position of 9th was confirmed, unable to catch Manchester United a place above or be caught by Brighton one place below.

Manager David Moyes' final game as manager was also West Ham's final game of the season, on 19 May at the City of Manchester Stadium against Manchester City who were attempting to win their fourth consecutive Premier League title. Phil Foden scored twice for City, in the second and 18th minute but Mohammed Kudus pulled one back for West Ham in the 42nd minute with an overhead kick. Rodri scored in the 59th minute to make it 3–1, the final score, giving City the three points they needed to win the 2023–24 Premier League.

== Squad ==
As of 30 June 2024

Squad no.	Player	Nationality	Position(s)	Date of birth (age)
Goalkeepers
1	Łukasz Fabiański	(Poland)	GK	18 April 1985 (aged 39)
23	Alphonse Areola	(France)	GK	27 February 1993 (aged 31)
49	Joseph Anang	(Ghana)	GK	8 June 2000 (aged 24)
Defenders
2	Ben Johnson	(England)	LB/RB	24 January 2000 (aged 24)
3	Aaron Cresswell	(England)	LB	15 December 1989 (aged 34)
4	Kurt Zouma	(France)	CB	27 October 1994 (aged 29)
5	Vladimír Coufal	(Czech Republic)	RB	22 August 1992 (aged 31)
15	Konstantinos Mavropanos	(Greece)	CB/RB	11 December 1997 (aged 26)
21	Angelo Ogbonna	(Italy)	CB	23 May 1988 (aged 36)
27	Nayef Aguerd	(Morocco)	CB	30 March 1996 (aged 28)
33	Emerson Palmieri	(Italy)	LB	3 August 1994 (aged 29)
42	Kaelan Casey	(England)	CB	28 October 2004 (aged 19)
57	Oliver Scarles	(England)	LB	12 December 2005 (aged 18)
Midfielders
7	James Ward-Prowse	(England)	CM	1 November 1994 (aged 29)
10	Lucas Paquetá	(Brazil)	AM/CM	27 August 1997 (aged 26)
11	Kalvin Phillips	(England)	DM	2 December 1995 (aged 28)
14	Mohammed Kudus	(Ghana)	AM/RW	2 August 2000 (aged 23)
17	Maxwel Cornet	(Ivory Coast)	LW/LB/CF	27 September 1996 (aged 27)
19	Edson Álvarez	(Mexico)	DM/ CB	24 October 1997 (aged 26)
28	Tomáš Souček	(Czech Republic)	DM/CM	27 February 1995 (aged 29)
40	George Earthy	(England)	DM	5 September 2004 (aged 19)
61	Lewis Orford	(England)	CM/AM	18 February 2006 (aged 18)
Forwards
9	Michail Antonio	(Jamaica)	CF/LW/RW	28 March 1990 (aged 34)
18	Danny Ings	(England)	CF/SS	23 July 1992 (aged 31)
20	Jarrod Bowen	(England)	RW/CF/SS	20 December 1996 (aged 27)
45	Divin Mubama	(England)	CF	25 October 2004 (aged 19)
Out on loan
22	Saïd Benrahma	(Algeria)	LW/RW/AM	10 August 1995 (aged 28)
24	Thilo Kehrer	(Germany)	CB/RB/LB	21 September 1996 (aged 27)
50	Callum Marshall	(Northern Ireland)	CF	28 November 2004 (aged 19)

Last updated: 30 June 2024.
Source: West Ham United F.C.

== Transfers ==
=== In ===
Date	Pos.	Player	Transferred from	Fee	Ref.
30 June 2023	LW	(Republic of Ireland) Sean Moore †	(Northern Ireland) Cliftonville	Undisclosed	
10 August 2023	DM	(Mexico) Edson Álvarez	(Netherlands) Ajax	£35,400,000	
14 August 2023	CM	(England) James Ward-Prowse	(England) Southampton	£30,000,000	
22 August 2023	CB	(Greece) Konstantinos Mavropanos	(Germany) VfB Stuttgart	£19,000,000	
27 August 2023	AM	(Ghana) Mohammed Kudus	(Netherlands) Ajax	£38,000,000	
1 September 2024	CM	(Scotland) Andy Irving	Austria Klagenfurt	Undisclosed	

† Signed for the Under-21s

=== Out ===
Date	Pos.	Player	Transferred to	Fee	Ref.
30 June 2023	CB	(England) Jamal Baptiste	(England) Manchester City	Released	
30 June 2023	CB	(England) Asher Falase	(England) Bishop's Stortford	Released	
30 June 2023	GK	(Scotland) Brian Kinnear	(Scotland) Clyde	Released	
30 June 2023	AM	(Argentina) Manuel Lanzini	(Argentina) River Plate	Released	
30 June 2023	CF	(Republic of Ireland) Mipo Odubeko	(Portugal) Marítimo	Released	
30 June 2023	LW	(Republic of Ireland) Armstrong Oko-Flex	(Switzerland) Zürich	Released	
1 July 2023	LB	(Democratic Republic of the Congo) Arthur Masuaku	(Turkey) Beşiktaş	Undisclosed	
15 July 2023	DM	(England) Declan Rice	(England) Arsenal	£105,000,000	
7 August 2023	CF	(Italy) Gianluca Scamacca	(Italy) Atalanta	Undisclosed	
8 August 2023	AM	(Croatia) Nikola Vlašić	(Italy) Torino	Undisclosed	
12 January 2024	DM	(Republic of Ireland) Conor Coventry	(England) Charlton Athletic	Undisclosed	
19 January 2024	LW	(England) Thierry Nevers	(Moldova) Sheriff Tiraspol	Undisclosed	
19 January 2024	DM	(England) Archie Woods	(United Arab Emirates) Dubai City	Undisclosed	
2 February 2024	AM	(Spain) Pablo Fornals	(Spain) Real Betis	£6,800,000	

=== Loaned in ===
Date	Pos.	Player	Loaned from	On loan until	Ref.
26 January 2024	DM	(England) Kalvin Phillips	(England) Manchester City	End of season	

=== Loaned out ===
Date	Pos.	Player	Loaned to	On loan until	Ref.
1 July 2023	GK	(England) Nathan Trott	(Denmark) Vejle	End of season	
21 July 2023	GK	(Hungary) Krisztián Hegyi	(England) Stevenage	3 January 2024 (Note: On 3 January, Hegyi was recalled from his season-long loan at Stevenage. He was subsequently loaned to Den Bosch.)	
28 July 2023	DM	(England) Freddie Potts	(England) Wycombe Wanderers	End of season	
29 July 2023	AM	(England) Kamarai Simon-Swyer	(England) Crawley Town	End of season	
21 August 2023	DM	(England) Flynn Downes	(England) Southampton	End of season	
25 August 2023	GK	(England) Mason Terry	(England) Concord Rangers	End of season	
1 September 2024	CM	(Scotland) Andy Irving	Austria Klagenfurt	End of season	
1 September 2023	DM	(England) Archie Woods	(England) Dartford	19 January 2024 (Note: On 19 January, Woods returned from his season-long loan at Dartford and subsequently left the club by mutual consent.)	
2 September 2023	DM	(England) Keenan Forson	(England) Dagenham & Redbridge	End of season	
5 January 2024	CB	(Germany) Thilo Kehrer	(France) Monaco	End of season	
8 January 2024	GK	(Hungary) Krisztián Hegyi	(Netherlands) Den Bosch	End of season	
12 January 2024	CF	(England) Gideon Kodua	(England) Wycombe Wanderers	End of season	
23 January 2024	CB	(England) Billy Bates	(England) Cheshunt	End of season	
26 January 2024	CF	(Northern Ireland) Callum Marshall	(England) West Bromwich Albion	End of season	
1 February 2024	RM	(England) Daniel Chesters	(England) Salford City	End of season	
2 February 2024	LW	(Algeria) Saïd Benrahma	(France) Lyon	End of season	

== Pre-season and friendlies ==
On 23 March West Ham announced a pre-season tour of Australia, with two matches against Perth Glory and Tottenham Hotspur. On 13 June, the Hammers announced a third friendly, against Dagenham & Redbridge. A day later, a fourth and fifth friendly were added, against Rennes and Boreham Wood respectively. On 28 June a sixth fixture was added, versus Bayer Leverkusen.

Win Draw Loss Fixtures

10 July 2023 Friendly	Boreham Wood	1–4	West Ham United	Borehamwood
19:00 BST	Ilesanmi 89'	Report	Ings 25'; Simon-Swyer 45+1'; Bowen 78'; Kodua 87'	Stadium: Meadow Park; Attendance: 2,696; Referee: Aaron Farmer

15 July 2023 Friendly	Perth Glory	2–6	West Ham United	Perth, Australia
18:00 AWST; 11:00 BST	Luizão 45' (o.g.); Bennie 73'	Report	Ings 2'; Scamacca 20' (pen.); Bowen 55', 86'; Emerson 69'; Mubama 82'	Stadium: Perth Stadium; Attendance: 24,723; Referee: Alireza Faghani (Iran)

18 July 2023 Friendly	Tottenham Hotspur	2–3	West Ham United	Perth, Australia
18:00 AWST; 11:00 BST	Emerson (yellow card) 60'; Lo Celso 68'; Udogie 71'	Report	Ings 17'; Mubama 23'; Scamacca 78'	Stadium: Perth Stadium; Attendance: 46,266; Referee: Kurt Ams (Australia)

22 July 2023 Friendly	Dagenham & Redbridge	2–2	West Ham United	Dagenham
15:00 BST	Effiong 30'; Ibie 80' (pen.)	Report	Cornet 11'; Mubama 52'	Stadium: Victoria Road; Referee: Morgan Conn

29 July 2023 Friendly	Rennes	3–1	West Ham United	Rennes, France
18:00 CEST; 17:00 BST	Santamaria 9'; Kalimuendo 75'; Ogbonna 89' (o.g.)	Report	Souček 66'	Stadium: Roazhon Park; Attendance: 26,387; Referee: Romain Lissorgue (France)

5 August 2023 Friendly	Bayer Leverkusen	4–0	West Ham United	Leverkusen, Germany
13:30 CEST; 12:30 BST	Hofmann 4'; Kehrer 24' (o.g.); Boniface 38'; Andrich 70' (pen.)	Report	Zouma (yellow card) 8'; Paquetá (yellow card) 21'; Coventry (yellow card) 83'	Stadium: BayArena; Attendance: 25,325; Referee: Sascha Stegemann (Germany)

== Competitions ==
=== Overall record ===
Competition	First match	Last match	Starting round	Final position	Record							
Competition	First match	Last match	Starting round	Final position	Pld	W	D	L	GF	GA	GD	Win %
Premier League	12 August 2023	19 May 2024	Matchday 1	9th	38	14	10	14	60	74	−14	36.84
FA Cup	7 January 2024	16 January 2024	Third round	Third round	2	0	1	1	1	2	−1	0.00
EFL Cup	27 September 2023	20 December 2023	Third round	Quarter-finals	3	2	0	1	5	6	−1	66.67
UEFA Europa League	21 September 2023	18 April 2024	Group stage	Quarter-finals	10	6	1	3	16	8	+8	60.00
Total					53	22	12	19	82	90	−8	41.51

Source: Soccerway

=== Premier League ===
==== League table ====
Pos	Team	Pld	W	D	L	GF	GA	GD	Pts	Qualification or relegation
7	Newcastle United	38	18	6	14	85	62	+23	60	
8	Manchester United	38	18	6	14	57	58	−1	60	Qualification for the Europa League league phase (Note: Manchester United qualified for the Europa League league phase as the 2023–24 FA Cup winners.)
9	West Ham United	38	14	10	14	60	74	−14	52	
10	Crystal Palace	38	13	10	15	57	58	−1	49	
11	Brighton & Hove Albion	38	12	12	14	55	62	−7	48	

Source: Premier League
Rules for classification: 1) Points; 2) Goal difference; 3) Goals scored; 4) If the champions, relegated teams or qualified teams for UEFA competitions cannot be determined by rules 1 to 3, rules 4.1 to 4.3 are applied – 4.1) Points gained in head-to-head record between such teams; 4.2) Away goals scored in head-to-head record between such teams; 4.3) Play-offs

==== Results summary ====
Overall								Home						Away					
Pld	W	D	L	GF	GA	GD	Pts	W	D	L	GF	GA	GD	W	D	L	GF	GA	GD
38	14	10	14	60	74	−14	52	7	8	4	31	28	+3	7	2	10	29	46	−17

Source: Soccerway

==== Results by round ====
Round	1	2	3	4	5	6	7	8	9	10	11	12	13	14	15	16	17	18	19	20	21	22	23	24	25	26	27	28	29	30	31	32	33	34	35	36	37	38
Ground	A	H	A	A	H	A	H	H	A	H	A	H	A	H	A	A	H	H	A	H	A	H	A	H	A	H	A	H	H	A	H	A	H	A	H	A	H	A
Result	D	W	W	W	L	L	W	D	L	L	L	W	W	D	W	L	W	W	W	D	D	D	L	L	L	W	W	D	D	L	D	W	L	L	D	L	W	L
Position	13	7	2	4	6	7	7	7	9	9	12	9	9	9	9	9	8	6	6	6	6	6	7	8	9	8	7	7	7	7	7	7	8	8	8	9	9	9
Points	1	4	7	10	10	10	13	14	14	14	14	17	20	21	24	24	27	30	33	34	35	36	36	36	36	39	42	43	44	44	45	48	48	48	49	49	52	52

Source: Soccerway
A = Away; H = Home; W = Win; D = Draw; L = Loss

==== Matches ====
On 15 June, the Premier League fixtures were released.

Win Draw Loss Fixtures

12 August 2023 1	Bournemouth	1–1	West Ham United	Bournemouth
15:00 BST	Solanke 82'; Mepham (yellow card) 90+7'	Report	Bowen (yellow card) 39', (goal) 51'; Antonio (yellow card) 49'; Emerson (yellow card) 87'; Paquetá (yellow card) 90+4'	Stadium: Dean Court; Attendance: 11,189; Referee: Peter Bankes

20 August 2023 2	West Ham United	3–1	Chelsea	Stratford
16:30 BST	Aguerd 7', (yellow card) 13' (yellow-red card) 67'; Paquetá (yellow card) 35', (goal) 90+5' (pen.); Emerson (yellow card) 45'; Antonio 53'	Report	Chukwuemeka 28', (yellow card) 40'; Disasi (yellow card) 36'; Fernández (penalty missed) 43'; Jackson (yellow card) 72'	Stadium: London Stadium; Attendance: 62,470; Referee: John Brooks

26 August 2023 3	Brighton & Hove Albion	1–3	West Ham United	Brighton
17:30 BST	Groß 81'; Mitoma (yellow card) 88'	Report	Ward-Prowse 19', (yellow card) 24'; Álvarez (yellow card) 45+1'; Bowen 58'; Antonio 63'; Kehrer (yellow card) 89'	Stadium: Falmer Stadium; Attendance: 31,508; Referee: Anthony Taylor

1 September 2023 4	Luton Town	1–2	West Ham United	Luton
20:00 BST	Nakamba (yellow card) 87'; Andersen 90+2'	Report	Bowen 37'; Emerson (yellow card) 81'; Zouma 85'	Stadium: Kenilworth Road; Attendance: 10,802; Referee: Paul Tierney

16 September 2023 5	West Ham United	1–3	Manchester City	Stratford
15:00 BST	Ward-Prowse 36'; Álvarez (yellow card) 38'; Souček (yellow card) 79'; Paquetá (yellow card) 90+6'	Report	Gvardiol (yellow card) 45+2'; Doku 46'; Silva 76'; Haaland 86'; Rodri (yellow card) 89'	Stadium: London Stadium; Attendance: 62,475; Referee: Andrew Madley

24 September 2023 6	Liverpool	3–1	West Ham United	Liverpool
14:00 BST	Salah 16' (pen.); Núñez 60'; Jota 85'	Report	Álvarez (yellow card) 36'; Bowen 42'; Zouma (yellow card) 82'	Stadium: Anfield; Attendance: 50,136; Referee: Chris Kavanagh

30 September 2023 7	West Ham United	2–0	Sheffield United	Stratford
15:00 BST	Bowen 24'; Souček 37'; Álvarez (yellow card) 40'	Report	McAtee (yellow card) 32'	Stadium: London Stadium; Attendance: 62,459; Referee: Graham Scott

8 October 2023 8	West Ham United	2–2	Newcastle United	Stratford
14:00 BST	Souček 8'; Emerson (yellow card) 16'; Antonio (yellow card) 35'; Paquetá (yellow card) 70'; Kudus 89'	Report	Bruno Guimarães (yellow card) 17'; Isak 57', 62'; Almirón (yellow card) 67'; Longstaff (yellow card) 79'	Stadium: London Stadium; Attendance: 62,473; Referee: Peter Bankes

22 October 2023 9	Aston Villa	4–1	West Ham United	Birmingham
16:30 BST	Douglas Luiz 30', 51' (pen.); Watkins 74'; Bailey 89'	Report	Emerson (yellow card) 54'; Bowen 56'	Stadium: Villa Park; Attendance: 41,734; Referee: David Coote

29 October 2023 10	West Ham United	0–1	Everton	Stratford
13:00 GMT	Kudus (yellow card) 28'; Paquetá (yellow card) 69'; Benrahma (yellow card) 77'; Álvarez (yellow card) 83'	Report	Pickford (yellow card) 28'; Calvert-Lewin 51'	Stadium: London Stadium; Attendance: 62,469; Referee: Stuart Attwell

4 November 2023 11	Brentford	3–2	West Ham United	Brentford
15:00 GMT	Maupay 11'; Ajer (yellow card) 24'; Mavropanos 55' (o.g.); Collins 69'	Report	Emerson (yellow card) 12'; Kudus 19'; Bowen 26'; Souček (yellow card) 52'; Mavropanos (yellow card) 62'; Ings (yellow card) 90+5'	Stadium: Brentford Community Stadium; Attendance: 17,103; Referee: Thomas Bramall

12 November 2023 12	West Ham United	3–2	Nottingham Forest	Stratford
14:00 GMT	Paquetá 3'; Coufal (yellow card) 22'; Kudus (yellow card) 60'; Bowen 65'; Souček 88'	Report	Awoniyi 44'; Niakhaté (yellow card) 54'; Elanga 63', (yellow card) 64'	Stadium: London Stadium; Attendance: 62,470; Referee: Michael Salisbury

25 November 2023 13	Burnley	1–2	West Ham United	Burnley
15:00 GMT	Beyer (yellow card) 32'; Rodriguez 49' (pen.)	Report	Álvarez (yellow card) 39'; Aguerd (yellow card) 39'; Coufal (yellow card) 66'; O'Shea 86' (o.g.); Souček 90+1'	Stadium: Turf Moor; Attendance: 21,319; Referee: Sam Barrott

3 December 2023 14	West Ham United	1–1	Crystal Palace	Stratford
14:00 GMT	Kudus 13'; Ward-Prowse (yellow card) 37'; Coufal (yellow card) 79'	Report	Édouard 53'	Stadium: London Stadium; Attendance: 62,459; Referee: Michael Oliver

7 December 2023 15	Tottenham Hotspur	1–2	West Ham United	Tottenham
20:15 GMT	Romero 11', (yellow card) 89'; Porro (yellow card) 59'	Report	Bowen 52'; Emerson (yellow card) 57'; Ward-Prowse 74', (yellow card) 80'; Álvarez (yellow card) 90+2'	Stadium: Tottenham Hotspur Stadium; Attendance: 60,733; Referee: Michael Salisbury

10 December 2023 16	Fulham	5–0	West Ham United	Fulham
14:00 GMT	Jiménez 22'; Willian 31'; Adarabioyo 40'; Palhinha (yellow card) 45+1'; Wilson 60'; Ballo-Touré (yellow card) 75'; Carlos Vinícius 88'	Report	Cresswell (yellow card) 18'	Stadium: Craven Cottage; Attendance: 23,988; Referee: Paul Tierney

17 December 2023 17	West Ham United	3–0	Wolverhampton Wanderers	Stratford
14:00 GMT	Kudus 22', 32'; Zouma (yellow card) 45+4'; Bowen 74'; Coufal (yellow card) 87'; Kehrer (yellow card) 90+3'	Report	Toti (yellow card) 45+2'	Stadium: London Stadium; Attendance: 62,455; Referee: Chris Kavanagh

23 December 2023 18	West Ham United	2–0	Manchester United	Stratford
12:30 GMT	Kudus (yellow card) 43', (goal) 78'; Bowen 72'; Paquetá (yellow card) 74'	Report	Evans (yellow card) 45+2'; Fernandes (yellow card) 51'; Shaw (yellow card) 90+8'	Stadium: London Stadium; Attendance: 62,472; Referee: Simon Hooper

28 December 2023 19	Arsenal	0–2	West Ham United	Holloway
20:15 GMT	Nelson (yellow card) 72'; Gabriel Jesus (yellow card) 90+1'	Report	Souček 13'; Mavropanos 55'; Benrahma (penalty missed) 90+6'	Stadium: Emirates Stadium; Attendance: 60,261; Referee: Michael Oliver

2 January 2024 20	West Ham United	0–0	Brighton & Hove Albion	Stratford
19:30 GMT	Johnson (yellow card) 31'	Report		Stadium: London Stadium; Attendance: 62,462; Referee: Sam Barrott

21 January 2024 21	Sheffield United	2–2	West Ham United	Sheffield
14:00 GMT	Hamer (yellow card) 38'; Brereton 44'; Brooks (yellow card) 68'; Ahmedhodžić (yellow card) 75'; Brewster (red card) 90+3'; McBurnie 90+13' (pen.)	Report	Cornet 28'; Ward-Prowse (yellow card) 42', (goal) 79' (pen.); Coufal (yellow card) 90+3' (yellow-red card) 90+7'	Stadium: Bramall Lane; Attendance: 29,164; Referee: Michael Salisbury

1 February 2024 22	West Ham United	1–1	Bournemouth	Stratford
19:30 GMT	Ward-Prowse 61' (pen.); Bowen (yellow card) 70'	Report	Solanke 3'; Christie (yellow card) 67'; Cook (yellow card) 83'; Faivre (yellow card) 90+7'	Stadium: London Stadium; Attendance: 62,451; Referee: Tim Robinson
Note: The match was originally scheduled for 30 January, but was moved for TV broadcast.

4 February 2024 23	Manchester United	3–0	West Ham United	Trafford
14:00 GMT	Højlund 23'; Garnacho 49', 84'	Report	Souček (yellow card) 37'	Stadium: Old Trafford; Attendance: 73,612; Referee: Andrew Madley

11 February 2024 24	West Ham United	0–6	Arsenal	Stratford
14:00 GMT	Álvarez (yellow card) 9'; Areola (yellow card) 38'; Kudus (yellow card) 76'; Phillips (yellow card) 90+1'	Report	Saliba 32'; Saka 41' (pen.), 63'; Gabriel 44'; Trossard 45+2'; Rice 65'	Stadium: London Stadium; Attendance: 62,474; Referee: Craig Pawson

17 February 2024 25	Nottingham Forest	2–0	West Ham United	West Bridgford
15:00 GMT	Gibbs-White (yellow card) 9'; Awoniyi 45+5', (yellow card) 45+6'; Williams (yellow card) 60'; Domínguez (yellow card) 68'; Hudson-Odoi 90+4'	Report	Kudus (yellow card) 8'; Antonio (yellow card) 36'; Zouma (yellow card) 57'; Coufal (yellow card) 68'; Phillips (yellow card) 68' (yellow-red card) 71'	Stadium: City Ground; Attendance: 29,490; Referee: Thomas Bramall

26 February 2024 26	West Ham United	4–2	Brentford	Stratford
20:00 GMT	Bowen 5', 7', 63'; Emerson 69'; Álvarez (yellow card) 89'	Report	Maupay 13'; Reguilón (yellow card) 23'; Jørgensen (yellow card) 52'; Wissa 82'	Stadium: London Stadium; Attendance: 62,450; Referee: Simon Hooper

2 March 2024 27	Everton	1–3	West Ham United	Liverpool
15:00 GMT	Beto (penalty missed) 45', 56'; Pickford (yellow card) 90+2'	Report	Zouma 62'; Souček 90+1', (yellow card) 90+2'; Antonio (yellow card) 90+3'; Álvarez 90+5'	Stadium: Goodison Park; Attendance: 39,262; Referee: Craig Pawson

10 March 2024 28	West Ham United	2–2	Burnley	Stratford
14:00 GMT	Souček (yellow card) 44'; Paquetá 46', (yellow card) 83'; Ings 90+1'	Report	Fofana 11'; Mavropanos 45+1' (o.g.); Assignon (yellow card) 64'; Delcroix (yellow card) 72'; Berge (yellow card) 76'; Estève (yellow card) 84'	Stadium: London Stadium; Attendance: 62,441; Referee: Darren England
Note: Fixture was originally scheduled for 9 March, but was moved due to West Ham's UEFA Europa League participation.

17 March 2024 29	West Ham United	1–1	Aston Villa	Stratford
14:00 GMT	Antonio 29'; Álvarez (yellow card) 83'; Kudus (yellow card) 86'; Mavropanos (yellow card) 87'	Report	Tielemans (yellow card) 70'; Zaniolo 79', (yellow card) 83'; Douglas Luiz (yellow card) 86'	Stadium: London Stadium; Attendance: 62,461; Referee: Jarred Gillett
Note: Fixture was originally scheduled for 16 March, but was moved due to West Ham's UEFA Europa League participation.

30 March 2024 30	Newcastle United	4–3	West Ham United	Newcastle upon Tyne
12:30 BST	Isak 6' (pen.), 77' (pen.), (yellow card) 90+4'; Gordon (yellow card) 80' (yellow-red card) 90+4'; Barnes 83', 90', (yellow card) 83'	Report	Antonio 21'; Souček (yellow card) 40'; Kudus 45+10'; Bowen 48'	Stadium: St James' Park; Attendance: 52,199; Referee: Robert Jones
Note: Fixture was originally scheduled for a 15:00 kick-off, but was brought forward for live TNT Sports coverage.

2 April 2024 31	West Ham United	1–1	Tottenham Hotspur	Stratford
20:15 BST	Zouma 19'; Antonio (yellow card) 53'	Report	Johnson 5', (yellow card) 74'; Van de Ven (yellow card) 44'; Bentancur (yellow card) 61'; Romero (yellow card) 89'	Stadium: London Stadium; Attendance: 62,469; Referee: John Brooks
Note: Fixture was initially scheduled for a 19:45 kick-off, but was moved for live TNT Sports broadcast.

6 April 2024 32	Wolverhampton Wanderers	1–2	West Ham United	Wolverhampton
15:00 BST	Sarabia 33' (pen.), (yellow card) 90+12'; João Gomes (yellow card) 43'; Toti (yellow card) 78'; Traoré (yellow card) 88'; Cunha (yellow card) 90+14'	Report	Emerson (yellow card) 31'; Paquetá 72' (pen.), (yellow card) 90'; Ward-Prowse 84'	Stadium: Molineux Stadium; Attendance: 31,504; Referee: Tony Harrington

14 April 2024 33	West Ham United	0–2	Fulham	Stratford
14:00 BST	Paquetá (yellow card) 90+7'	Report	Pereira 9', 72', (yellow card) 61'; Decordova-Reid (yellow card) 81'	Stadium: London Stadium; Attendance: 62,459; Referee: Stuart Attwell

21 April 2024 34	Crystal Palace	5–2	West Ham United	Selhurst
15:00 BST	Olise 7'; Eze 16'; Emerson 20' (o.g.); Mateta 31', 64'; Hughes (yellow card) 39'; Mitchell (yellow card) 45+8'; Ahamada (yellow card) 66'	Report	Antonio (yellow card) 27', (goal) 40'; Souček (yellow card) 45+8'; Henderson 89' (o.g.)	Stadium: Selhurst Park; Attendance: 25,145; Referee: Graham Scott
Note: Fixture was initially scheduled for 20 April, but was moved due to the UEFA Europa League progression.

27 April 2024 35	West Ham United	2–2	Liverpool	Stratford
12:30 BST	Bowen 43'; Antonio 77'	Report	Endō (yellow card) 30'; Robertson 48'; Areola 65' (o.g.); Mac Allister (yellow card) 90+5'	Stadium: London Stadium; Attendance: 62,474; Referee: Anthony Taylor
Note: Fixture was initially scheduled for a 15:00 kick-off, but was moved due live TNT Sports coverage.

5 May 2024 36	Chelsea	5–0	West Ham United	Fulham
14:00 BST	Palmer 15'; Gallagher 30'; Madueke 36'; Cucurella (yellow card) 38'; Jackson 48', 80'	Report	Ogbonna (yellow card) 34'; Emerson (yellow card) 44'; Paquetá (yellow card) 45+2'	Stadium: Stamford Bridge; Attendance: 39,295; Referee: Andrew Madley
Note: Fixture was initially scheduled for 4 May, but was moved due to Chelsea's matchday 26 being rescheduled for the Thursday prior.

11 May 2024 37	West Ham United	3–1	Luton Town	Stratford
15:00 BST	Emerson (yellow card) 52'; Ward-Prowse 54'; Souček 65'; Earthy 76'	Report	Sambi Lokonga 6'; Barkley (yellow card) 10'; Burke (yellow card) 79'; Morris (yellow card) 83'	Stadium: London Stadium; Attendance: 62,475; Referee: Michael Oliver

19 May 2024 38	Manchester City	3–1	West Ham United	Manchester
16:00 BST	Foden 2', 18'; Rodri 59'	Report	Kudus 42'; Álvarez (yellow card) 76'	Stadium: City of Manchester Stadium; Attendance: 53,544; Referee: John Brooks

=== FA Cup ===
As a Premier League side, West Ham joined in the third round, and were drawn at home against EFL Championship club Bristol City.

Win Draw Loss Fixtures

7 January 2024 Third round	West Ham United	1–1	Bristol City	Stratford
14:00 GMT	Bowen 4'; Álvarez (yellow card) 45+5'; Ward-Prowse (yellow card) 53'	Report	Williams (yellow card) 33'; Conway (yellow card) 35', (goal) 61'; Pring (yellow card) 60'	Stadium: London Stadium; Attendance: 62,477; Referee: Graham Scott

16 January 2024 Third round replay	Bristol City	1–0	West Ham United	Bristol
19:45 GMT	Conway 3'; Williams (yellow card) 50'; Gardner-Hickman (yellow card) 63'	Report	Benrahma (red card) 51'; Cresswell (yellow card) 64'	Stadium: Ashton Gate Stadium; Attendance: 25,616; Referee: Darren England

=== EFL Cup ===
The Hammers entered the competition in the third round, and were drawn away to Lincoln City. After defeating Lincoln 1–0, they were drawn at home to Arsenal in the fourth round. Following a 3–1 victory, West Ham would next be drawn away to Liverpool in the quarter-finals, and were eliminated following a 5–1 defeat.

Win Draw Loss Fixtures

27 September 2023 Third round	Lincoln City	0–1	West Ham United	Lincoln
19:45 BST	O'Connor (yellow card) 74'	Report	Souček (yellow card) 64', (goal) 70'	Stadium: Sincil Bank; Attendance: 10,168; Referee: Josh Smith

1 November 2023 Fourth round	West Ham United	3–1	Arsenal	Stratford
19:30 GMT	White 16' (o.g.); Kudus 50'; Bowen 60'	Report	Ødegaard 90+6'	Stadium: London Stadium; Attendance: 62,154; Referee: Simon Hooper

20 December 2023 Quarter-finals	Liverpool	5–1	West Ham United	Liverpool
20:00 GMT	Szoboszlai 28'; Jones 56', 84'; Gakpo 71'; Salah 82'; Núñez (yellow card) 90'	Report	Álvarez (yellow card) 52'; Bowen 77'	Stadium: Anfield; Attendance: 57,332; Referee: Tim Robinson

=== UEFA Europa League ===
==== Group stage ====
On 1 September, West Ham United were drawn into Group A of the Europa League, alongside Olympiacos, SC Freiburg and TSC. The match schedule was announced the following day.

Pos	Team	Pld	W	D	L	GF	GA	GD	Pts	Qualification	WHU	FRE	OLY	TSC
1	(England) West Ham United	6	5	0	1	10	4	+6	15	Advance to round of 16	—	2–0	1–0	3–1
2	(Germany) SC Freiburg	6	4	0	2	17	7	+10	12	Advance to knockout round play-offs	1–2	—	5–0	5–0
3	(Greece) Olympiacos	6	2	1	3	11	14	−3	7	Transfer to Europa Conference League	2–1	2–3	—	5–2
4	(Serbia) TSC	6	0	1	5	6	19	−13	1		0–1	1–3	2–2	—

Source: UEFA
Rules for classification: Group stage tiebreakers

21 September 2023 1	West Ham United (England)	3–1	(Serbia) TSC	London, England
20:00 BST	Kehrer (yellow card) 41'; Kudus 66', 70'; Souček 82'	Report	Kuveljić (yellow card) 32'; Stanić 48'	Stadium: London Stadium; Attendance: 41,374; Referee: Filip Glova (Slovakia)

5 October 2023 2	SC Freiburg (Germany)	1–2	(England) West Ham United	Freiburg, Germany
18:45 CEST; 17:45 BST	Höfler (yellow card) 25'; Sallai 49'	Report	Paquetá 8'; Álvarez (yellow card) 48'; Aguerd 66'	Stadium: Europa-Park Stadion; Attendance: 34,100; Referee: Mohammed Al-Hakim (Sweden)

26 October 2023 3	Olympiacos (Greece)	2–1	(England) West Ham United	Piraeus, Greece
18:45 CEST; 17:45 BST	Fortounis 33'; Rodinei 45+1'; Retsos (yellow card) 47'; Camara (yellow card) 82'; Masouras (yellow card) 90+3'	Report	Paquetá (yellow card) 64', (goal) 87'; Antonio (yellow card) 76'; Ogbonna (yellow card) 88'	Stadium: Karaiskakis Stadium; Attendance: 30,623; Referee: Andris Treimanis (Latvia)

9 November 2023 4	West Ham United (England)	1–0	(Greece) Olympiacos	London, England
20:00 GMT	Álvarez (yellow card) 19'; Kudus (yellow card) 28'; Paquetá 73'; Bowen (yellow card) 90+4'	Report	Podence (yellow card) 38'; Porozo (yellow card) 83'; Fortounis (yellow card) 90+2'; Camara (yellow card) 90+4'	Stadium: London Stadium; Attendance: 55,811; Referee: Matej Jug (Slovenia)

30 November 2023 5	TSC (Serbia)	0–1	(England) West Ham United	Bačka Topola, Serbia
18:45 CET; 17:45 GMT	Petrović (yellow card) 45'; Čalušić (yellow card) 63'	Report	Fornals (yellow card) 55'; Emerson (yellow card) 87'; Souček 89'	Stadium: TSC Arena; Attendance: 4,256; Referee: Allard Lindhout (Netherlands)

14 December 2023 6	West Ham United (England)	2–0	(Germany) SC Freiburg	London, England
20:00 GMT	Kudus 14'; Álvarez 42'	Report		Stadium: London Stadium; Attendance: 48,876; Referee: João Pinheiro (Portugal)

==== Knockout phase ====
===== Round of 16 =====
The round of 16 draw took place on 23 February, with the Hammers being drawn against group stage opponents SC Freiburg.

7 March 2024 First leg	SC Freiburg (Germany)	1–0	(England) West Ham United	Freiburg, Germany
21:00 CET; 20:00 GMT	Sildillia (yellow card) 40'; Sallai (yellow card) 50'; Gregoritsch 81'	Report	Paquetá (yellow card) 58'	Stadium: Europa-Park Stadion; Attendance: 34,700; Referee: Alejandro Hernández Hernández (Spain)

14 March 2024 Second leg	West Ham United (England)	5–0 (5–1 agg.)	(Germany) SC Freiburg	London, England
17:45 GMT	Paquetá 9'; Bowen 32'; Cresswell 52', (yellow card) 66'; Álvarez (yellow card) 73'; Kudus 77', 85'	Report		Stadium: London Stadium; Attendance: 51,014; Referee: Marco Guida (Italy)

===== Quarter-finals =====
The quarter-final draw took place on 15 March, with West Ham being drawn against Bayer Leverkusen, another German club.

11 April 2024 First leg	Bayer Leverkusen (Germany)	2–0	(England) West Ham United	Leverkusen, Germany
21:00 CEST; 20:00 BST	Hofmann 83'; Boniface 90+1'	Report	Paquetá (yellow card) 21'; Emerson (yellow card) 56'	Stadium: BayArena; Attendance: 30,210; Referee: Artur Soares Dias (Portugal)

18 April 2024 Second leg	West Ham United (England)	1–1 (1–3 agg.)	(Germany) Bayer Leverkusen	London, England
20:00 BST	Antonio 13', (yellow card) 31'; Bowen (yellow card) 72'; Coufal (yellow card) 79'; Zouma (yellow card) 79'; Souček (yellow card) 85'; Álvarez (yellow card) 90'	Report	Kossounou (yellow card) 5'; Tah (yellow card) 31'; Palacios (yellow card) 85'; Kovář (yellow card) 87'; Frimpong 89'; Adli (yellow card) 90'	Stadium: London Stadium; Attendance: 62,473; Referee: José María Sánchez Martínez (Spain)

== Statistics ==
- Correct as of match played 19 May 2024

=== Appearances and goals ===
No.	Pos	Nat	Player	Total		Premier League		FA Cup		EFL Cup		Europa League	
No.	Pos	Nat	Player	Apps	Goals	Apps	Goals	Apps	Goals	Apps	Goals	Apps	Goals
Goalkeepers
1	GK	(Poland) POL	Łukasz Fabiański	23	0	7+3	0	2	0	2	0	9	0
23	GK	(France) FRA	Alphonse Areola	33	0	31	0	0	0	1	0	1	0
Defenders
2	DF	(England) ENG	Ben Johnson	22	0	4+10	0	0+2	0	2	0	1+3	0
3	DF	(England) ENG	Aaron Cresswell	18	1	4+7	0	1	0	0	0	5+1	1
4	DF	(France) FRA	Kurt Zouma	39	3	32+1	3	2	0	0	0	4	0
5	DF	(Czech Republic) CZE	Vladimír Coufal	47	0	36	0	2	0	2	0	7	0
15	DF	(Greece) GRE	Konstantinos Mavropanos	33	1	16+3	1	2	0	3	0	9	0
21	DF	(Italy) ITA	Angelo Ogbonna	17	0	7+4	0	0+1	0	2	0	2+1	0
27	DF	(Morocco) MAR	Nayef Aguerd	28	2	21	1	0	0	1	0	5+1	1
33	DF	(Italy) ITA	Emerson	47	1	35+1	1	2	0	1	0	5+3	0
42	DF	(England) ENG	Kaelan Casey	1	0	0+1	0	0	0	0	0	0	0
Midfielders
7	MF	(England) ENG	James Ward-Prowse	51	7	34+3	7	2	0	0+2	0	9+1	0
10	MF	(Brazil) BRA	Lucas Paquetá	43	8	31	4	1	0	1+1	0	8+1	4
11	MF	(England) ENG	Kalvin Phillips	10	0	3+5	0	0	0	0	0	0+2	0
14	MF	(Ghana) GHA	Mohammed Kudus	45	14	27+6	8	0	0	3	1	9	5
17	MF	(Ivory Coast) CIV	Maxwel Cornet	16	1	1+6	1	1+1	0	1	0	0+6	0
19	MF	(Mexico) MEX	Edson Álvarez	42	2	28+3	1	1	0	2+1	0	6+1	1
28	MF	(Czech Republic) CZE	Tomáš Souček	52	10	34+3	7	2	0	3	1	7+3	2
40	MF	(England) ENG	George Earthy	4	1	0+3	1	0	0	0	0	0+1	0
Forwards
9	FW	(Jamaica) JAM	Michail Antonio	32	7	21+5	6	0	0	0	0	3+3	1
18	FW	(England) ENG	Danny Ings	29	1	3+16	1	1+1	0	1+1	0	2+4	0
20	FW	(England) ENG	Jarrod Bowen	44	20	34	16	1	1	2	2	6+1	1
45	FW	(England) ENG	Divin Mubama	12	0	0+5	0	0+2	0	0+1	0	1+3	0
Players who left the club permanently or on loan during the season
8	MF	(Spain) ESP	Pablo Fornals	23	0	4+11	0	1	0	2	0	4+1	0
22	FW	(Algeria) ALG	Saïd Benrahma	22	0	5+8	0	1	0	3	0	4+1	0
24	DF	(Germany) GER	Thilo Kehrer	12	0	0+4	0	0	0	1+2	0	3+2	0
50	FW	(Northern Ireland) NIR	Callum Marshall	1	0	0	0	0+1	0	0	0	0	0

=== Goalscorers ===
Rank	Pos.	No.	Nat.	Player	Premier League	FA Cup	EFL Cup	Europa League	Total
1	FW	20	(England)	Jarrod Bowen	16	1	2	1	20
2	MF	14	(Ghana)	Mohammed Kudus	8	0	1	5	14
3	MF	28	(Czech Republic)	Tomáš Souček	7	0	1	2	10
4	MF	10	(Brazil)	Lucas Paquetá	4	0	0	4	8
5=	MF	7	(England)	James Ward-Prowse	7	0	0	0	7
5=	FW	9	(Jamaica)	Michail Antonio	6	0	0	1	7
7	DF	4	(France)	Kurt Zouma	3	0	0	0	3
8=	MF	19	(Mexico)	Edson Álvarez	1	0	0	1	2
8=	DF	27	(Morocco)	Nayef Aguerd	1	0	0	1	2
10=	DF	3	(England)	Aaron Cresswell	0	0	0	1	1
10=	DF	15	(Greece)	Konstantinos Mavropanos	1	0	0	0	1
10=	MF	17	(Ivory Coast)	Maxwel Cornet	1	0	0	0	1
10=	FW	18	(England)	Danny Ings	1	0	0	0	1
10=	DF	33	(Italy)	Emerson	1	0	0	0	1
10=	MF	40	(England)	George Earthy	1	0	0	0	1
Own goals					2	0	1	0	3
Totals					60	1	5	16	82

=== Discipline ===
No.	Pos.	Player	Premier League			FA Cup			EFL Cup			Europa League			Total		
No.	Pos.	Player	Yellow card	(yellow card) (yellow-red card)	Red card	Yellow card	(yellow card) (yellow-red card)	Red card	Yellow card	(yellow card) (yellow-red card)	Red card	Yellow card	(yellow card) (yellow-red card)	Red card	Yellow card	(yellow card) (yellow-red card)	Red card
Goalkeepers
23	GK	(France) Alphonse Areola	1	0	0	0	0	0	0	0	0	0	0	0	1	0	0
Defenders
2	DF	(England) Ben Johnson	1	0	0	0	0	0	0	0	0	0	0	0	1	0	0
3	DF	(England) Aaron Cresswell	1	0	0	1	0	0	0	0	0	1	0	0	3	0	0
4	DF	(France) Kurt Zouma	3	0	0	0	0	0	0	0	0	1	0	0	4	0	0
5	DF	(Czech Republic) Vladimír Coufal	5	1	0	0	0	0	0	0	0	1	0	0	6	1	0
15	DF	(Greece) Konstantinos Mavropanos	2	0	0	0	0	0	0	0	0	0	0	0	2	0	0
21	DF	(Italy) Angelo Ogbonna	1	0	0	0	0	0	0	0	0	1	0	0	2	0	0
27	DF	(Morocco) Nayef Aguerd	1	1	0	0	0	0	0	0	0	0	0	0	1	1	0
33	DF	(Italy) Emerson	10	0	0	0	0	0	0	0	0	3	0	0	13	0	0
Midfielders
7	MF	(England) James Ward-Prowse	4	0	0	1	0	0	0	0	0	0	0	0	5	0	0
10	MF	(Brazil) Lucas Paquetá	10	0	0	0	0	0	0	0	0	3	0	0	13	0	0
11	MF	(England) Kalvin Phillips	1	1	0	0	0	0	0	0	0	0	0	0	1	1	0
14	MF	(Ghana) Mohammed Kudus	6	0	0	0	0	0	0	0	0	1	0	0	7	0	0
19	MF	(Mexico) Edson Álvarez	11	0	0	1	0	0	1	0	0	4	0	0	17	0	0
28	MF	(Czech Republic) Tomáš Souček	7	0	0	0	0	0	1	0	0	1	0	0	9	0	0
Forwards
9	FW	(Jamaica) Michail Antonio	6	0	0	0	0	0	0	0	0	2	0	0	8	0	0
18	FW	(England) Danny Ings	1	0	0	0	0	0	0	0	0	0	0	0	1	0	0
20	FW	(England) Jarrod Bowen	2	0	0	0	0	0	0	0	0	2	0	0	4	0	0
Players who left the club permanently or on loan during the season
8	MF	(Spain) Pablo Fornals	0	0	0	0	0	0	0	0	0	1	0	0	1	0	0
22	FW	(Algeria) Saïd Benrahma	1	0	0	0	0	1	0	0	0	0	0	0	1	0	1
24	DF	(Germany) Thilo Kehrer	2	0	0	0	0	0	0	0	0	1	0	0	3	0	0
Totals			76	3	0	3	0	1	2	0	0	22	0	0	103	3	1

=== Clean sheets ===
The list is sorted by shirt number when total clean sheets are equal.

Rank	No.	Nat	Player	Premier League	FA Cup	EFL Cup	Europa League	Total
1	1	(Poland)	Łukasz Fabiański	1	0	1	4	6
2	23	(France)	Alphonse Areola	4	0			4
Totals				5	0	1	4	10
