= 2026–27 Reading F.C. season =

156th season in existence of Reading FC

Reading
2026–27 season
- Owner: Redwood Holdings
- Manager: Leam Richardson
- Stadium: Madejski Stadium
- League One: 6th
- FA Cup: Second round
- EFL Cup: Third round vs Brentford
- EFL Trophy: Group stage
- Top goalscorer: League: Jack Marriott (8); All: Jack Marriott (9)
- Highest home attendance: 14,065 (vs Luton Town, 15 August 2026, League One)
- Lowest home attendance: 2,652 (vs Wycombe Wanderers, 18 August 2026, EFL Trophy)
- Average home league attendance: 11,347
Home colours	Away colours
- All statistics correct as of 2 May 2026.

The 2026–27 season is Reading's 156th and their fourth consecutive season in EFL League One.

== Season events ==
=== Pre-season ===
On 5 May, Reading released their retained and released list, with Mamadi Camará, Ben Elliott, Michael Stickland, Tivonge Rushesha and Andy Yiadom all leaving the club at the end of their contracts on 30 June. Reading confirmed that they had activated one-year extension clauses with Jeriel Dorsett, whilst new contracts had been offered to Kelvin Abrefa and Andy Rinomhota.

On 11 May, Reading announced that they had entered into a two-year footballing partnership with American youth football team Louisiana Fire SC. Also on 11 May, Reading released their retained and released list for their Under-21s. Jacob Borgnis, John Clarke, Miles Obodo, Jeremiah Okine-Peters, Basil Tuma and Jay Williams would all be released at the end of their contracts, whilst Carter Bowdery, Philip Duah, Sam Harrison, David Hicks, Luke Howard, Abraham Kanu, Harrison Rhone, John Ryan, Shay Spencer all had one-year extensions to their contracts activated, and Boyd Beacroft, Tom Norcott, Emmanuel Osho, Matt Rowley, Tyler Sackey and Joe Barough were all in talks regarding new contracts with the club.

On 12 May, Reading announced their retained and released list for their U18s, with Jacob Neptune and Ainsley Covus having one-year contract options activated, whilst Dennis Bossman, George Booth, Anthony Dove, Harley Irish and T’Shay St Louis had all been offered contracts to extend their stay with the club.

On 19 May, Reading announced that Harrison Rhone had signed a new contract with the club, until the summer of 2028.

On 8 June, Matt Ritchie announced his retirement from football after a playing career at clubs such as: Portsmouth, Dagenham & Redbridge, Notts County, Swindon Town, AFC Bournemouth, Newcastle United and the Royals whilst he made 16 appearances for the Scotland national football team.

On 10 June, Reading announced that they would end their pre-season preparations with a home game against Charlton Athletic on 1 August which would see former player Harvey Knibbs return to the Select Car Leasing Stadium for the first time since he left for the Addicks in August 2025.

On 14 June, Reading announced that they had extended their contract with Andy Rinomhota for another season, keeping him at the club until the summer of 2027.

On 22 June, Derrick Williams announced his retirement from football after a playing career at clubs such as: Aston Villa, Bristol City, Blackburn Rovers, LA Galaxy, D.C. United, Atlanta United and the Royals whilst he made 3 appearances for the Republic of Ireland national football team. Also later on the same day, Reading announced the signing of Kyreece Lisbie to a four-year contract after signing for undisclosed fee from EFL League Two club Colchester United joining his brother Kyrell Lisbie in the division who plays at fellow EFL League One club Peterborough United.

On 24 June, Reading announced that they had extended their contract with Kelvin Abrefa until the summer of 2028.

On 25 June, the EFL League One fixture list was released, with Reading starting their season at home to Luton Town on 15 August, and ending the season with a trip to Doncaster Rovers on 8 May. The next day, 26 June, Reading's away fixture against Oxford United scheduled for 29 August, over the August Bank Holiday weekend, was moved to 19:45hrs on 8 September at the request of Thames Valley Police.

On 29 June, with the squad returning to training, Reading announced that Rob Kelly had left his role as Assistant Manager to Leam Richardson due to personal circumstances.

On 30 June, Reading announced the singing of Udoka Godwin-Malife for an undisclosed fee from Burton Albion, on a contract until the summer of 2029. Later the same day, Reading announced that they had signed new one-year contracts with Matthew Rowley and Boyd Beacroft, a two-year contract with Tom Norcott and Emmanuel Osho, a three-year contract with Tyler Sackey and six-month contracts with Joe Barough and Dennis Bossman whilst they rehab from injury.

=== July ===
On 2 July, Reading announced the signing of Jacob Brown on a free-transfer after he'd left Luton Town, to a two-year contract.

On 3 July, Reading announced the appointment of John Coleman as Leam Richardson's new Assistant Manager, and that goalkeeper Tom Norcott had joined Derry City on loan until 1 January.

On 9 July, Reading announced that George Booth, Anthony Dove, Harley Irish and T'Shay St Louis had all signed new one-year contracts with the Under-18s, and that Callum Cliff had signed a one-year contract with the club after leaving Fulham's Academy.

On 10 July, Reading announced the season-long loan signing of Josh Stokes from Bristol City.

On 11 July, Harrison Rhone joined Brackley Town on loan until January.

On 21 July, Reading announced that Select Car Leasing, their front of shirt sponsor for the previous five season, would now be their back of shirt sponsor whilst also retaining the naming rights to the stadium and featuring on the training kit, academy kit, junior replica kit and the Women's teams. On 23 July, Reading announce Mr Vegas as their new front of shirt sponsor for the 2026–27 season.

On 24 July, Reece Evans joined Bedford Town on loan until 31 August.

On 29 July, Kelvin Ehibhatiomhan left the club to sign for Danish Superliga club Horsens for an undisclosed fee.

On 30 July, Reading confirmed that their final pre-season friendly against Charlton Athletic had been moved to The Valley, and played behind-closed doors at 14:00hrs, due to the new pitch at the Madejski Stadium not being ready in time. Later the same day, Reading's home game against Leyton Orient scheduled for 20 October, was moved to 21 October at 20:00hrs to be shown on Sky Sports, whilst their home game against Bromley was brought forward to 12:30hrs on 21 November to be shown on Sky Sports +. At the same time Reading's away trip to Plymouth Argyle, on 31 October, and their trip to Burton Albion on 12 December, where both moved forward to 12:30 kickoffs to be shown on Sky Sports +.

On 31 July, Reading announced the signing of Matteo Dashi from Crystal Palace to a two-year contract and the singing of Torin Ntege from West Bromwich Albion to a one-year contract.

=== August ===
On 6 August, Reading announced their new squad numbers for the season, and that David Hicks had joined Bedford Town on loan until the end of August.

On 11 August, Readings League One fixture at home to Mansfield Town scheudled for 1 September, was pushed back 24hrsto 2 September. This was due to Sky Sports picking Chelsea vs Fulham for broadcast on Monday 24 August, and the knock on effect of players having 72hrs rest between matches, which then meant Luton Town's match against Mansfield was moved to 30 August as Luton face Chelsea on 27 August.

On 12 August, Shay Spencer joined Slough Town on loan until mid-October.

On 19 August, Reading announced the signing of George Earthy from West Ham United for an undisclosed fee, on a contract until the summer of 2029.

On 24 August, Reading announced the signing of Calum Logan to a two-year contract after he'd left Tottenham Hotspur earlier in the summer, and the signing of Kevin Mfuamba to a one-year contract following his departure from West Bromwich Albion also in the summer.

On 25 August, Reading announced the signing of Jeremiah Berkeley-Agyepong from Chelsea, to a two-year contract, and the signing of free-agent Conor Masterson, who had been training with the club, on a short-term contract until January.

On 28 August, Reading announced the season-long loan signing of Josh Knight from Portsmouth, and that their Third Round match against Brentford had been scheduled for 15 September, whilst their League One match against Oxford United, scheduled for 8 September, had been postponed for a second time at the request of Oxford United.

On 31 August, Reading announced the signing of Jamie Reid from Stevenage for an undisclosed fee, on a contract until the summer of 2028.

=== September ===
On 3 September, Reading's away fixture against Oxford United was arranged for 4 November.

On 4 September, Reading announced that Kelvin Abrefa had joined Forest Green Rovers on a three-month loan deal, and that Reece Evans and David Hicks had both extended their loan deals with Bedford Town until January.

On 11 September, Jack Marriott's second goal against Luton Town on 15 August, was nominated for EFL League One Goal of the Month. On 18 September, the EFL announced that the goal had won the Goal of the Month.

On 21 September, Reading confirmed that their match against Wycombe Wanderers on 26 September would go ahead despite, Jeriel Dorsett, Andy Rinomhota and Charlie Savage being called up for international duty.

On 25 September, Abraham Kanu joined Wealdstone on a short-term loan deal until December.

=== October ===
On 5 October, Reading announced that they had signed a new contract with Sean Patton until the summer of 2028.

On 7 October, Jack Marriott was nominated for League One Player of the Month, whilst Leam Richardson was nominated for EFL League One Manager of the Month. Two days later, on 9 October, Marriott and Richardson were announced as the winners of the awards.

On 20 October, John Ryan joined Hampton & Richmond Borough on loan until the middle of January 2027.

=== November ===
On 5 November, Sky Sports announced that they had selected Reading's home game against Oxford United for broadcast and that the game would now kickoff at 12:30 on 6 February instead of the original 15:00 kickoff.

On 13 November, Reading confirmed that Emmanuel Osho had joined AFC Totton on loan until January 2027, whilst it was reported that academy prospect Tyler Adjei had left the club to sign for Manchester United.

On 17 November, Reading announced that Tyler Sackey had joined Aldershot Town on loan until January 2027.

== Squad ==
As of match played 14 November 2026

No.	Name	Nationality	Position	Date of birth (age)	Signed from	Signed in	Contract ends	Apps.	Goals
Goalkeepers
1	Joel Pereira (Note: Joel Pereira was born in Switzerland, but qualified to represent Portugal, representing them at youth level between 2012 and 2018.)	(Portugal)	GK	28 June 1996 (age 30)	Unattached	2023	2028	116	0
25	Jack Stevens	(England)	GK	2 August 1997 (age 29)	Cambridge United	2025	2027	13	0
48	Matthew Rowley	(England)	GK	30 July 2004 (age 22)	Academy	2020	2027	0	0
Defenders
2	Udoka Godwin-Malife	(England)	DF	9 May 2000 (age 26)	Burton Albion	2026	2029	17	1
3	Jeriel Dorsett (Note: Jeriel Dorsett was born in Enfield, England, but qualified to represent Montserrat and made his international debut for Montserrat in September 2023. He previously represented England at U18 level.)	(Montserrat)	DF	4 May 2002 (age 24)	Academy	2018	2027	99	3
5	Haydon Roberts	(England)	DF	10 May 2002 (age 24)	Bristol City	2026	2028	30	1
15	Paudie O'Connor	(Republic of Ireland)	DF	14 July 1997 (age 29)	Lincoln City	2025	2029	53	5
16	Benn Ward	(England)	DF	20 January 2004 (age 22)	Accrington Stanley	2026	2029	19	1
20	Josh Knight	(England)	DF	7 September 1997 (age 29)	on loan from Portsmouth	2026	2027	4	0
23	Conor Masterson	(Republic of Ireland)	DF	8 September 1998 (age 28)	Unattached	2026	2027	6	0
39	Ashqar Ahmed	(England)	DF	31 August 2007 (age 19)	Academy	2023	2027	30	0
42	Boyd Beacroft	(England)	DF	22 November 2005 (age 21)	Academy	2021	2027	5	0
Midfielders
4	Andy Rinomhota (Note: Andy Rinomhota was born in Leeds, England, but qualified to represent Zimbabwe making his senior debut in 2023.)	(Zimbabwe)	MF	21 April 1997 (age 29)	Unattached	2025	2027	157	4
6	Liam Fraser	(Canada)	MF	13 February 1998 (age 28)	Unattached	2025	2027	48	3
8	Charlie Savage (Note: Charlie Savage was born in Leicester, England, but qualified to represent Wales, representing them at U17, U18, U19, U21 and senior level.)	(Wales)	MF	2 May 2003 (age 23)	Manchester United	2023	2027	159	15
10	Lewis Wing	(England)	MF	23 June 1995 (age 31)	Unattached	2023	2028	163	34
11	Daniel Kyerewaa	(Germany)	MF	5 October 2001 (age 25)	Unattached	2025	2027	57	6
14	Randell Williams	(England)	MF	30 December 1996 (age 29)	Unattached	2025	2027	36	3
17	George Earthy	(England)	MF	5 September 2004 (age 22)	West Ham United	2026	2029	7	2
28	Josh Stokes	(England)	MF	29 April 2004 (age 22)	on loan from Bristol City	2026	2027	13	1
32	Paddy Lane (Note: Paddy Lane was born in England, but qualified to represent Northern Ireland making his senior debut in 2022.)	(Northern Ireland)	MF	18 February 2001 (age 25)	Portsmouth	2025	2028	54	5
Forwards
7	Jack Marriott	(England)	FW	9 September 1994 (age 32)	Wrexham	2025	2028	37	27
9	Jamie Reid (Note: Jamie Reid was born in Torquay, England, but qualified to represent Northern Ireland, making his senior debut in 2024.)	(Northern Ireland)	FW	15 July 1994 (age 32)	Stevenage	2026	2028	13	2
18	Jacob Brown (Note: Jacob Brown was born in Halifax, England, but qualified to represent Scotland, making his senior debut in 2021.)	(Scotland)	FW	10 April 1998 (age 28)	Unattached	2026	2028	19	5
19	Kyreece Lisbie	(England)	FW	1 December 2003 (age 22)	Colchester United	2026	2030	19	5
22	Sean Patton	(Republic of Ireland)	FW	25 July 2006 (age 20)	Derry City	2025	2028	9	2
U21
34	Joseph Barough	(England)	MF	3 April 2006 (age 20)	Academy	2023	2026	3	0
35	Carter Bowdery	(England)	MF	11 December 2006 (age 19)	Academy	2025	2027	0	0
37	Luke Howard	(England)	MF	29 September 2007 (age 19)	Academy	2025	2027	4	0
38	Philip Duah	(Ghana)	DF	13 November 2006 (age 20)	Academy	2024	2027	4	0
40	Sam Harrison	(England)	DF	24 October 2006 (age 20)	Academy	2024	2027	0	0
50	Jerae Jones	(England)	MF	22 May 2007 (age 19)	Academy	2024	2027	4	1
51	Josh Welland	(England)	GK	30 December 2006 (age 19)	Academy	2025	2027	0	0
52	Dennis Bossman	(England)	FW	7 October 2006 (age 20)	Academy	2023	2026	0	0
60	Scofield Lonmeni-Dekam	(England)	MF	27 January 2008 (age 18)	Liverpool	2026		1	0
63	Matteo Dashi	(Albania)	MF	22 January 2007 (age 19)	Unattached	2026	2028	1	0
64	Torin Ntege	(England)	MF	13 April 2006 (age 20)	Unattached	2026	2027	1	0
65	Kevin Mfuamba	(England)	MF	25 August 2006 (age 20)	Unattached	2026	2028	1	0
66	Calum Logan	(England)	DF	24 November 2006 (age 19)	Unattached	2026	2028	0	0
67	Jeremiah Berkeley-Agyepong	(England)	MF	27 July 2009 (age 17)	Chelsea	2026	2028	0	0
U18
53	Harley Irish	(England)	DF		Academy	2026	2027	0	0
54	T'Shay St. Louis	(Grenada)	MF	2 February 2008 (age 18)	Academy	2026	2027	0	0
56	George Booth	(Canada)	MF		Academy	2026	2027	0	0
57	Callum Cliff	(England)	DF	25 October 2007 (age 19)	Unattached	2026	2027	1	0
58	Toby Borgnis	(New Zealand)	GK	30 September 2008 (age 18)	Academy	2025		0	0
59	Anthony Dove	(England)	DF	19 April 2008 (age 18)	Academy	2026	2027	0	0
61	Jacob Neptune	(England)	DF	26 October 2007 (age 19)	Academy	2026		0	0
62	Ainsley Covus	(England)	MF		Academy	2026		0	0
	Josh Yensu	(England)	GK		Academy	2026		0	0
	Christian Cary	(England)	DF		Academy	2026		0	0
	Da'Jarn Martin-Grant	(England)	DF		Academy	2026		0	0
	Ryan Zie	(England)	DF		Academy	2026		0	0
	Ethan Heywood	(Canada)	DF	5 October 2009 (age 17)	Academy	2026		0	0
	Julian Garate	(Democratic Republic of the Congo)	MF	28 January 2010 (age 16)	Academy	2026		0	0
	Henry Agyekum	(England)	MF		Academy	2026		0	0
	Ryan Beacroft	(England)	MF		Academy	2026		0	0
	Elijah Gayle	(England)	MF		Academy	2026		0	0
	Kenaya Kaninda	(England)	MF	5 May 2010 (age 16)	Academy	2026		0	0
	Aaron Nour	(England)	MF		Academy	2026		0	0
	Matthias Ojo	(England)	MF		Academy	2026		0	0
	Lewis Otis	(England)	MF		Academy	2026		0	0
	Omari Zion	(England)	MF		Academy	2026		0	0
	Kai Russell	(Saint Lucia)	MF	7 April 2010 (age 16)	Academy	2026		0	0
	Dan Goulding	(Wales)	MF	12 October 2010 (age 16)	Academy	2026		0	0
	Lucas Daka	(Zambia)	MF		Academy	2026		0	0
	Kallum Fuller-Thompson	(England)	FW		Academy	2026		0	0
	Larry Omoregie	(England)	FW		Academy	2026		0	0
Away on loan
12	Kelvin Abrefa (Note: Kelvin Abrefa was born in Italy to Ghanaian parents, going on to make his debut for Ghana U20 in June 2022.)	(Ghana)	DF	9 December 2003 (age 22)	Academy	2020	2028	83	2
31	Tom Norcott	(England)	GK	3 January 2005 (age 21)	Academy	2021	2028	2	0
36	John Ryan	(Republic of Ireland)	DF	21 January 2004 (age 22)	Sassuolo	2023	2027	6	0
41	Harrison Rhone	(England)	GK	25 March 2006 (age 20)	Academy	2021	2028	0	0
43	David Hicks	(England)	MF	2 May 2006 (age 20)	Unattached	2025	2027	1	0
44	Tyler Sackey	(England)	MF	14 November 2006 (age 20)	Academy	2024	2029	9	2
45	Kiyan Coke-Miles-Smith	(England)	MF	22 November 2005 (age 21)	Academy	2024	2027	0	0
46	Abraham Kanu	(Sierra Leone)	DF	3 July 2005 (age 21)	Academy	2021	2027	16	0
47	Shay Spencer	(England)	MF	13 October 2005 (age 21)	Academy	2022	2027	9	0
49	Emmanuel Osho	(England)	MF	26 September 2006 (age 20)	Academy	2024	2028	12	0
55	Reece Evans (Note: Reece Evans was born in Northern Ireland, but qualified to represent Zimbabwe, making his senior debut for their U23's in November 2026.)	(Zimbabwe)	FW	25 September 2005 (age 21)	Unattached	2025	2027	2	0
Left during the season
9	Kelvin Ehibhatiomhan	(Nigeria)	FW	23 April 2003 (aged 22)	Academy	2021	2027	139	27
	Tyler Adjei	(England)	FW	17 July 2010 (age 16)	Academy	2026		0	0

== Transfers ==
For those players sold, released or contract ended before the start of this season, see 2025–26 Reading F.C. season.

=== In ===
Date	Position	Nationality	Name	From	Fee	Ref.
22 June 2026 (Note: Transfer announced on the shown date, becoming official on 1 July 2026.)	FW	(England)	Kyreece Lisbie	Colchester United	Undisclosed (Note: Transfer fee believed to be between £500,000 and £750,000.)	
30 June 2026	DF	(England)	Udoka Godwin-Malife	Burton Albion	Undisclosed (Note: Transfer fee believed to be £500,000.)	
2 July 2026	FW	(Scotland)	Jacob Brown	Unattached	Free	
9 July 2026	DF	(England)	Callum Cliff	Unattached	Free	
31 July 2026	MF	(Albania)	Matteo Dashi	Unattached	Free	
31 July 2026	MF	(England)	Torin Ntege	Unattached	Free	
19 August 2026	MF	(England)	George Earthy	West Ham United	Undisclosed (Note: Transfer fee believed to be £600,000.)	
24 August 2026	DF	(England)	Calum Logan	Unattached	Free	
24 August 2026	MF	(England)	Kevin Mfuamba	Unattached	Free	
25 August 2026	MF	(England)	Jeremiah Berkeley-Agyepong	Chelsea	Undisclosed	
25 August 2026	DF	(Republic of Ireland)	Conor Masterson	Unattached	Free	
31 August 2026	FW	(Northern Ireland)	Jamie Reid	Stevenage	Undisclosed	

=== Loans in ===
Start date	Position	Nationality	Name	From	End date	Ref.
10 July 2026	MF	(England)	Josh Stokes	Bristol City	End of Season	
28 August 2026	DF	(England)	Josh Knight	Portsmouth	End of Season	

=== Out ===
Date	Position	Nationality	Name	To	Fee	Ref.
29 July 2026	FW	(Nigeria)	Kelvin Ehibhatiomhan	Horsens	Undisclosed (Note: Transfer fee believed to be £640,000)	
13 November 2026	FW	(England)	Tyler Adjei	Manchester United	Undisclosed	

=== Loans out ===
Start date	Position	Nationality	Name	To	End date	Ref.
3 July 2026	GK	(England)	Tom Norcott	Derry City	1 January 2027	
11 July 2026	GK	(England)	Harrison Rhone	Brackley Town	1 January 2027	
24 July 2026	FW	(Zimbabwe)	Reece Evans	Bedford Town	1 January 2027	
6 August 2026	MF	(England)	David Hicks	Bedford Town	1 January 2027	
12 August 2026	MF	(England)	Shay Spencer	Slough Town	mid-October 2026	
4 September 2026	DF	(Ghana)	Kelvin Abrefa	Forest Green Rovers	4 December 2026	
25 September 2026	DF	(Sierra Leone)	Abraham Kanu	Wealdstone	19 December 2026	
20 October 2026	DF	(Republic of Ireland)	John Ryan	Hampton & Richmond Borough	20 January 2027	
6 November 2026	FW	(England)	Kiyan Coke-Miles-Smith	Chippenham Town	6 December 2026	
13 November 2026	MF	(England)	Emmanuel Osho	AFC Totton	13 January 2027	
17 November 2026	MF	(England)	Tyler Sackey	Aldershot Town	3 January 2027	
20 November 2026	FW	(Republic of Ireland)	Sean Patton	Forest Green Rovers	3 January 2027	

=== Trial ===
Date from	Position	Nationality	Name	Last club	Date to	Ref.
July 2026	FW	(England)	George Cleveland	Aylesbury United		
August 2026	DF	(Republic of Ireland)	Conor Masterson	Gillingham	25 August 2026	
October 2026	GK	(Pakistan)	Adam Khan	Blackburn Rovers		
November 2026	FW	(England)	Jayden McDonald	Crystal Palace		

=== Contract extensions ===
Date from	Position	Nationality	Name	Contract expiry	Ref.
5 May 2026	DF	(Montserrat)	Jeriel Dorsett	30 June 2027	
11 May 2026	MF	(England)	Carter Bowdery	30 June 2027	
11 May 2026	DF	(Ghana)	Philip Duah	30 June 2027	
11 May 2026	DF	(England)	Sam Harrison	30 June 2027	
11 May 2026	MF	(England)	David Hicks	30 June 2027	
11 May 2026	MF	(England)	Luke Howard	30 June 2027	
11 May 2026	DF	(Sierra Leone)	Abraham Kanu	30 June 2027	
11 May 2026	GK	(England)	Harrison Rhone	30 June 2027	
11 May 2026	DF	(Republic of Ireland)	John Ryan	30 June 2027	
11 May 2026	MF	(England)	Shay Spencer	30 June 2027	
12 May 2026	DF	(England)	Jacob Neptune	30 June 2027	
12 May 2026	MF	(England)	Ainsley Covus	30 June 2027	
19 May 2026	GK	(England)	Harrison Rhone	30 June 2028	
14 June 2026	MF	(Zimbabwe)	Andy Rinomhota	30 June 2027	
24 June 2026	DF	(Ghana)	Kelvin Abrefa	30 June 2028	
30 June 2026	GK	(England)	Tom Norcott	30 June 2028	
30 June 2026	GK	(England)	Matthew Rowley	30 June 2027	
30 June 2026	DF	(England)	Boyd Beacroft	30 June 2027	
30 June 2026	MF	(England)	Tyler Sackey	30 June 2029	
30 June 2026	MF	(England)	Emmanuel Osho	30 June 2028	
30 June 2026	MF	(England)	Joseph Barough	31 December 2026	
30 June 2026	FW	(England)	Dennis Bossman	31 December 2026	
8 July 2026	DF	(England)	Anthony Dove	30 June 2027	
8 July 2026	DF	(England)	Harley Irish	30 June 2027	
8 July 2026	MF	(Canada)	George Booth	30 June 2027	
8 July 2026	MF	(Grenada)	T'Shay St. Louis	30 June 2027	
5 October 2026	FW	(Republic of Ireland)	Sean Patton	30 June 2028	

== Friendlies ==
On 22 May, Reading announced that they would open their pre-season with a trip to the Cherrywood Road to face Farnborough on 11 July. Reading announced their second pre-season friendly on 8 June, a trip to face Woking at Kingfield Stadium on 25 July. On 10 June, Reading announced that they would end their pre-season preparations with a home game against Charlton Athletic on 1 August. On 12 June, Reading confirmed further fixtures away to Newport County and Crawley Town on 28 and 31 July. On 7 July, a pre-season training camp in Alicante, Spain was announced along with a friendly against Getafe.

11 July 2026	Farnborough	1–2	Reading	Farnborough
15:00 BST (UTC+1)	Robinson 80'	Report	Marriott 4'; Fraser 75'	Stadium: Saunders Transport Community Stadium; Attendance: 1,754

17 July 2026	Getafe	1–0	Reading	Oliva, Spain
18:00 BST (UTC+1)	Satriano 82'			Stadium: Oliva Nova Resort

25 July 2026	Woking	0–2	Reading	Woking
15:00 BST (UTC+1)		Report	Sackey 67'; Brown 88'	Stadium: Kingfield Stadium; Attendance: 1,498

28 July 2026	Newport County	0–4	Reading	Newport
19:30 BST (UTC+1)		Report	Brown 11'; Stokes 50'; Jones 68', 89'	Stadium: Rodney Parade; Attendance: 1,718

31 July 2026	Crawley Town	0–1	Reading	Crawley
19:30 BST (UTC+1)		Report	Beacroft 81'	Stadium: Broadfield Stadium

1 August 2026	Charlton Athletic	0–3	Reading	Charlton
14:00 BST (UTC+1)		Report	Wing 45', 83'; Evans 67'	Stadium: The Valley; Attendance: 0
Note: Match originally scheduled to be played at the Madejski Stadium, but moved to The Valley and played behind closed-doors, due to Madejski pitch not being ready.

=== Development team ===
On 2 June, Windsor & Eton announced that they would be facing a Reading XI in a preseason friendly.

18 July 2026	Basingstoke Town	2–1	Reading XI	Basingstoke
13:00 BST (UTC+1)	Chiriac; Brown	Report	Goal	Stadium: Winklebury Football Complex

28 July 2026	Windsor & Eton	0–3	Reading XI	Windsor
19:30 BST (UTC+1)				Stadium: Stag Meadow

28 July 2026	Swindon Supermarine	1–2	Reading XI	South Marston, Swindon
19:30 BST (UTC+1)	Warre	Report	Lonmeni-Dekam; Trialist	Stadium: Hunts Copse; Attendance: 112

== Competitions ==
=== Overall record ===
Competition	First match	Last match	Starting round	Final position	Record							
Competition	First match	Last match	Starting round	Final position	Pld	W	D	L	GF	GA	GD	Win %
League One	15 August 2026		Matchday 1		15	6	4	5	26	18	+8	40.00
FA Cup	7 November 2026		First Round		1	1	0	0	5	0	+5	100.00
EFL Cup	8 August 2026	15 September 2026	First Round	Third Round	3	1	1	1	5	3	+2	33.33
EFL Trophy	18 August 2026	10 November 2026	Group Stage	Group Stage	3	0	2	1	3	5	−2	0.00
Total					22	8	7	7	39	26	+13	36.36

Last updated: 14 November 2026
Source: Soccerway

=== League One ===
==== League table ====
Pos	Team	Pld	W	D	L	GF	GA	GD	Pts	Promotion, qualification or relegation
6	Bradford City	14	6	5	3	12	10	+2	23	Qualification for League One play-offs
7	Plymouth Argyle	16	7	2	7	21	24	−3	23	
8	Reading	16	6	4	6	26	19	+7	22	
9	Milton Keynes Dons	15	5	7	3	29	23	+6	22	
10	Leicester City	14	6	4	4	23	19	+4	22	

Updated to match(es) played on 21 November 2026. Source: EFL Official Website
Rules for classification: 1) Points; 2) Goal difference; 3) Number of goals scored; 4) Head-to-head results; 5) Wins; 6) Away goals; 7) Penalty points (sec 9.5); 8) 12-point sending off offences

==== Results summary ====
Overall								Home						Away					
Pld	W	D	L	GF	GA	GD	Pts	W	D	L	GF	GA	GD	W	D	L	GF	GA	GD
16	6	4	6	25	18	+7	22	5	1	1	16	6	+10	1	3	5	9	12	−3

Last updated: 21 November 2026.
Source: Soccerway

==== Results by round ====
Round	1	2	4	5	6	7	8	9	10	11	12	13	14	3	15	16
Ground	H	A	H	H	A	H	A	H	A	A	H	H	A	A	A	H
Result	L	D	W	W	L	W	D	D	W	L	W	W	D	L	L	L
Position	17	17	14	8	14	8	9	7	6	7	6	5	6	6	7	8
Points	0	1	4	7	7	10	11	12	15	15	18	21	22	22	22	22

Source: Soccerway
A = Away; H = Home; W = Win; D = Draw; L = Loss; P = Postponed
Notes:
- ^{1} Matchday 3 (vs. Oxford United) was rescheduled following a request from Thames Valley Police.

==== Matches ====
On 25 June, the League One fixtures were revealed.

15 August 2026 1	Reading	3–4	Luton Town	Reading
12:30 BST (UTC+1)	Marriott 8', 31', 38'; O'Connor (yellow card) 90+5'	Report	Richards 6'; Palmer 50', 52'; Walsh (yellow card) 72'; Kodua 90+6', (yellow card) 90+7'	Stadium: Select Car Leasing Stadium; Attendance: 14,065; Referee: Leigh Doughty

22 August 2026 2	AFC Wimbledon	0–0	Reading	Wimbledon
15:00 BST (UTC+1)	Hippolyte (yellow card) 19'; Johnson (yellow card) 29'	Report	O'Connor (yellow card) 29'; Rinomhota (yellow card) 38'; Savage (yellow card) 68'	Stadium: Cherry Red Records Stadium; Attendance: 8,334; Referee: Michael Barlow

2 September 2026 4	Reading	5–0	Mansfield Town	Reading
20:00 BST (UTC+1)	Marriott 35', 58'; Ward 40'; Earthy 44'; Pereira (yellow card) 72'; Brown 80'	Report		Stadium: Select Car Leasing Stadium; Attendance: 9,607; Referee: Tom Reeves
Note: Match originally scheduled for 1 September.

5 September 2026 5	Reading	3–1	Blackpool	Reading
15:00 BST (UTC+1)	Earthy 12'; Lisbie 49'; Brown 90+4'	Report	J.Williams (yellow card) 16'; Clarkson 80'	Stadium: Select Car Leasing Stadium; Attendance: 11,597; Referee: David Rock

12 September 2026 6	Cambridge United	2–1	Reading	Cambridge
15:00 BST (UTC+1)	Bennett 52'; Watts 62'; Ahadme (yellow card) 66'; Perry (yellow card) 80'	Report	Marriott 38'; Williams (yellow card) 90'	Stadium: Cledara Abbey Stadium; Attendance: 7,129; Referee: Oliver Yates

19 September 2026 7	Reading	2–0	Notts County	Reading
15:00 BST (UTC+1)	Marriott 49', 72'; Lisbie (yellow card) 90+1'; Lane (yellow card) 90+5'	Report	Mustapha (yellow card) 24'	Stadium: Select Car Leasing Stadium; Attendance: Simon Mather; Referee: 12,049

26 September 2026 8	Wycombe Wanderers	2–2	Reading	High Wycombe
15:00 BST (UTC+1)	Casey (yellow card) 30'; Wareham 61'; Harvie (yellow card) 68'; Ings 90'	Report	O'Connor 47'; Lisbie (yellow card) 68'; Brown 80'; Roberts (yellow card) 88'; Ward (yellow card) 90+5'	Stadium: Adams Park; Attendance: 7,191; Referee: Tom Reeves

3 October 2026 9	Reading	1–1	Bradford City	Reading
15:00 BST (UTC+1)	Rinomhota (yellow card) 12'; Roberts (yellow card) 18'; Godwin-Malife 66'	Report	Beesley 4'; Touray (yellow card) 35'; Baldwin (yellow card) 39'; Pointon (yellow card) 71'	Stadium: Select Car Leasing Stadium; Attendance: 12,737; Referee: Paul Howard

10 October 2026 10	Milton Keynes Dons	1–5	Reading	Denbigh
15:00 BST (UTC+1)	Ekpiteta (yellow card) 73'; Collins 85'	Report	Roberts (yellow card) 28'; Lane 38'; Bramall 47' (o.g.); Lisbie 64', 80'; Brown 87'	Stadium: Stadium MK; Attendance: 13,857; Referee: Matthew Corlett

17 October 2026 11	Wigan Athletic	1–0	Reading	Wigan
15:00 BST (UTC+1)	Gray (yellow card) 52'; Hogan 71'; Carragher (yellow card) 74'	Report	Rinomhota (yellow card) 23'; Roberts (yellow card) 74'	Stadium: The Brick Community Stadium; Attendance: 8,700; Referee: Edward Duckworth

21 October 2026 12	Reading	1–0	Leyton Orient	Reading
20:00 BST (UTC+1)	Stokes (yellow card) 14'; Wing (penalty missed) 32'; O'Connor (yellow card) 48'; Lane 52'	Report	Connolly (yellow card) 49'	Stadium: Select Car Leasing Stadium; Attendance: 8,705; Referee: Ben Toner
Note: Fixture was initially scheduled for 20 October, but was rescheduled to be shown on Sky Sports.

24 October 2026 13	Reading	2–1	Barnsley	Reading
15:00 BST (UTC+1)	Lisbie 54', 68'; O'Connor (yellow card) 60'	Report	Yoganathan 7'	Stadium: Select Car Leasing Stadium; Attendance: 10,670; Referee: Scott Oldham

31 October 2026 14	Plymouth Argyle	0–0	Reading	Plymouth
12:30 GMT (UTC)	Evans (yellow card) 25'	Report	Dorsett (yellow card) 90+1'; Lisbie (yellow card) 90+1'; Rinomhota (yellow card) 90+4'	Stadium: Home Park; Attendance: 16,316; Referee: Stephen Martin
Note: Fixture was initially scheduled for 15:00, but was rescheduled to be shown on Sky Sports +.

4 November 2026 3	Oxford United	2–0	Reading	Littlemore
19:45 GMT (UTC)	Kioso (yellow card) 40'; O'Donkor 71'; Missanga 78'; Sibley (yellow card) 88'	Report	Stokes (yellow card) 41'; O'Connor (yellow card) 76'; Rinomhota (yellow card) 82'; Lisbie (yellow card) 84'	Stadium: The Kassam Stadium; Attendance: 11,470; Referee: Darren Drysdale
Note: Fixture was initially scheduled for 29 August, but was rescheduled to 8 September following a request from Thames Valley Police. The match was again postponed on 28 August at the request of Oxford United.

14 November 2026 15	Stockport County	3–1	Reading	Edgeley
15:00 GMT (UTC)	Wootton 6'; Ennis 32'; Diamond 52'; Wood (yellow card) 59'; Gordon (yellow card) 76'	Report	Marriott 11'; Roberts (yellow card) 23'; Lisbie (yellow card) 45+4'; Fraser (yellow card) 90+4'	Stadium: Edgeley Park; Attendance: 9,778; Referee: Bobby Madley

21 November 2026 16	Reading	0–1	Bromley	Reading
12:30 GMT (UTC)		Report	Adeboyejo 58'	Stadium: Select Car Leasing Stadium; Attendance: 12,300; Referee: Ross Martin
Note: Fixture was initially scheduled for 15:00, but was rescheduled to be shown on Sky Sports +.

=== FA Cup ===
Reading were drawn away to Peterborough United in the first round and at home to Stockport County in the second round.

7 November 2026 First Round	Peterborough United	0–5	Reading	Peterborough
20:00 GMT (UTC)	Williams (yellow card) 9'; Mills (yellow card) 51'; Khela (yellow card) 66'; Kelly (yellow card) 86'	Report	Kyerewaa (yellow card) 23' (goal) 26'; Marriott 34'; Savage 45+4'; Ahmed (yellow card) 59'; Reid 72', 76'	Stadium: London Road Stadium; Attendance: 4,003; Referee: Dean Whitestone
Note: Match selected for broadcast on TNT Sports.

5 December 2026 Second round	Reading	v	Stockport County	Reading
15:00 GMT (UTC)				Stadium: Select Car Leasing Stadium

=== EFL Cup ===
Reading were drawn away to Bromley in the first round, Stevenage in the second round and then at home to Brentford in the third round.

8 August 2026 First Round	Bromley	1–1 (4–5 p)	Reading	Bromley
15:00 BST (UTC+1)	Cheek 33'; Taylor (yellow card) 69' (yellow-red card) 90'; Archer (yellow card) 90+8'	Report	Stokes 14'; Wing (penalty missed) 70'; Williams (yellow card) 90+11'	Stadium: Copperjax Community Stadium; Attendance: 3,496; Referee: Craig Hicks
	Penalties
	Adeboyejo (penalty scored); McKiernan (penalty scored); Ifill (penalty scored); Conteh (penalty scored); Archer (penalty missed)		(penalty scored) Wing; (penalty scored) Savage; (penalty scored) Marriott; (penalty scored) Fraser; (penalty scored) Williams

25 August 2026 Second Round	Stevenage	0–3	Reading	Stevenage
19:45 BST (UTC+1)	Butler (yellow card) 29'	Report	Brown 9'; Lane 24'; Dorsett (yellow card) 41'; Williams 85'	Stadium: SPORTA Arena; Attendance: 2,013; Referee: Richard Eley

15 September 2026 Third Round	Reading	1–2	Brentford	Reading
20:00 BST (UTC+1)	O'Connor 72'	Report	Wilson 3'; Carvalho 45+1'	Stadium: Select Car Leasing Stadium; Attendance: 13,489; Referee: Tom Nield

=== EFL Trophy ===
==== Group stage ====
Reading were drawn against Wycombe Wanderers, Bristol Rovers and Chelsea U21 into Southern Group C.

Pos	Div	Team	Pld	W	PW	PL	L	GF	GA	GD	Pts	Qualification
1	L1	Wycombe Wanderers	3	2	0	1	0	7	3	+4	7	Advance to Round 2
2	ACA	Chelsea U21	3	1	1	0	1	5	4	+1	5	Advance to Round 2
3	L1	Reading	3	0	1	1	1	3	5	−2	3	
4	L2	Bristol Rovers	3	0	1	1	1	5	8	−3	3	

Source: EFL

18 August 2026 1	Reading	1–1 (3–1 p)	Wycombe Wanderers	Reading
19:00 BST (UTC+1)	Savage (yellow card) 56'; Fraser 76', (yellow card) 87'	Report	Quitirna 71'	Stadium: Select Car Leasing Stadium; Attendance: 2,652; Referee: Isaac Searle
	Penalties
	Savage (penalty scored); Fraser (penalty scored); Lane (penalty scored)		Tezgel (penalty missed); Boyd-Munce (penalty scored); Hagelskjær (penalty missed); Leahy (penalty missed)

13 October 2026 2	Reading	0–2	Chelsea U21	Reading
19:00 BST (UTC+1)		Report	Ezenwata 21', 25'; Bettoni (yellow card) 79'; McMahon (yellow card) 90+2'; Watson (yellow card) 90+2'	Stadium: Select Car Leasing Stadium; Attendance: 1,667; Referee: George Laflin

10 November 2026 3	Bristol Rovers	2–2 (5–3 p)	Reading	Bristol
19:00 GMT (UTC)	Appiah 58'; Sanyaolu 65'; Southam-Hales (yellow card) 75'; Leigh (yellow card) 90+5'	Report	Patton 3'; Beacroft (yellow card) 40'; Jones 55'	Stadium: Memorial Stadium; Attendance: 1,215; Referee: Oliver Mackey
	Penalties
	Leigh (penalty scored); Sparkes (penalty scored); De Havilland (penalty scored); Russell-Denny (penalty scored); Salahi-Ali (penalty scored)		Patton (penalty scored); Beacroft (penalty scored); Sackey (penalty scored); Dashi (penalty missed)

== Squad statistics ==
=== Appearances and goals ===
As of match played 21 November 2026

Players with no appearances are not included on the list
Italics indicate a loaned in player

No.	Pos	Nat	Player	Total		League One		FA Cup		League Cup		League Trophy	
No.	Pos	Nat	Player	Apps	Goals	Apps	Goals	Apps	Goals	Apps	Goals	Apps	Goals
1	GK	(Portugal) POR	Joel Pereira	20	0	16	0	1	0	3	0	0	0
2	DF	(England) ENG	Udoka Godwin-Malife	18	1	16	1	1	0	1	0	0	0
3	DF	(Montserrat) MSR	Jeriel Dorsett	13	0	8	0	0	0	2+1	0	2	0
4	MF	(Zimbabwe) ZIM	Andy Rinomhota	16	0	14	0	1	0	1	0	0	0
5	DF	(England) ENG	Haydon Roberts	16	0	12+1	0	1	0	1	0	1	0
6	MF	(Canada) CAN	Liam Fraser	11	1	2+3	0	1	0	2+1	0	2	1
7	FW	(England) ENG	Jack Marriott	13	10	10+1	9	1	1	0+1	0	0	0
8	MF	(Wales) WAL	Charlie Savage	18	1	1+11	0	1	1	2+1	0	2	0
9	FW	(Northern Ireland) NIR	Jamie Reid	14	2	4+8	0	0+1	2	1	0	0	0
10	MF	(England) ENG	Lewis Wing	17	0	16	0	0	0	1	0	0	0
11	MF	(Germany) GER	Daniel Kyerewaa	20	1	5+9	0	1	1	2+1	0	1+1	0
14	MF	(England) ENG	Randell Williams	22	1	2+14	0	0+1	0	2+1	1	2	0
15	DF	(Republic of Ireland) IRL	Paudie O'Connor	18	2	15	1	1	0	2	1	0	0
16	DF	(England) ENG	Benn Ward	11	1	9	1	0	0	2	0	0	0
17	MF	(England) ENG	George Earthy	8	2	5+1	2	0	0	1+1	0	0	0
18	FW	(Scotland) SCO	Jacob Brown	20	5	2+13	4	0	0	2+1	1	2	0
19	FW	(England) ENG	Kyreece Lisbie	19	5	15	5	1	0	1+2	0	0	0
20	DF	(England) ENG	Josh Knight	5	0	3	0	1	0	0	0	1	0
22	FW	(Republic of Ireland) IRL	Sean Patton	1	1	0	0	0	0	0	0	1	1
23	DF	(Republic of Ireland) IRL	Conor Masterson	6	0	1+1	0	0+1	0	2	0	1	0
25	GK	(England) ENG	Jack Stevens	3	0	0	0	0	0	0	0	3	0
28	MF	(England) ENG	Josh Stokes	13	1	10+1	0	0	0	2	1	0	0
32	MF	(Northern Ireland) NIR	Paddy Lane	16	3	10+2	2	0	0	1+2	1	1	0
34	MF	(England) ENG	Joe Barough	1	0	0	0	0	0	0	0	0+1	0
37	MF	(England) ENG	Luke Howard	3	0	0	0	0	0	0	0	1+2	0
38	DF	(Ghana) GHA	Philip Duah	2	0	0	0	0	0	0	0	1+1	0
39	DF	(England) ENG	Ashqar Ahmed	6	0	0	0	0+1	0	2	0	3	0
42	DF	(England) ENG	Boyd Beacroft	3	0	0	0	0	0	0	0	2+1	0
50	FW	(England) ENG	Jerae Jones	5	1	0+2	0	0	0	0	0	1+2	1
57	DF	(England) ENG	Callum Cliff	1	0	0	0	0	0	0	0	1	0
60	MF	(England) ENG	Scofield Lonmeni-Dekam	1	0	0	0	0	0	0	0	0+1	0
63	MF	(Albania) ALB	Matteo Dashi	1	0	0	0	0	0	0	0	0+1	0
64	FW	(England) ENG	Torin Ntege	1	0	0	0	0	0	0	0	0+1	0
65	MF	(England) ENG	Kevin Mfuamba	1	0	0	0	0	0	0	0	1	0
Players who featured but are away on loan:
43	MF	(England) ENG	David Hicks	1	0	0	0	0	0	0	0	1	0
44	MF	(England) ENG	Tyler Sackey	2	0	0	0	0	0	0	0	1+1	0
49	FW	(England) ENG	Emmanuel Osho	4	0	0	0	0+1	0	0	0	2+1	0
55	FW	(Zimbabwe) ZIM	Reece Evans	1	0	0	0	0	0	0	0	0+1	0
Players who featured but departed the club permanently during the season:

=== Goal scorers ===
As of match played 21 November 2026

Place	Position	Nation	Number	Name	League One	FA Cup	League Cup	League Trophy	Total
1	FW	(England)	7	Jack Marriott	9	1	0	0	10
2	FW	(England)	19	Kyreece Lisbie	5	0	0	0	5
2	FW	(Scotland)	18	Jacob Brown	4	0	1	0	5
4	MF	(Northern Ireland)	32	Paddy Lane	2	0	1	0	3
5	MF	(England)	17	George Earthy	2	0	0	0	2
5	DF	(Republic of Ireland)	15	Paudie O'Connor	1	0	1	0	2
5	FW	(Northern Ireland)	9	Jamie Reid	0	2	0	0	2
8	DF	(England)	16	Benn Ward	1	0	0	0	1
8	DF	(England)	2	Udoka Godwin-Malife	1	0	0	0	1
8	FW	(England)	50	Jerae Jones	0	0	0	1	1
8	MF	(Germany)	11	Daniel Kyerewaa	0	1	0	0	1
8	FW	(Republic of Ireland)	22	Sean Patton	0	0	0	1	1
8	MF	(Wales)	8	Charlie Savage	0	1	0	0	1
8	MF	(England)	28	Josh Stokes	0	0	1	0	1
8	MF	(England)	14	Randell Williams	0	0	1	0	1
8	MF	(Canada)	6	Liam Fraser	0	0	0	1	1
8				Own goal	1	0	0	0	1
Total					26	5	5	3	39

=== Clean sheets ===
As of match played 21 November 2026

Place	Position	Nation	Number	Name	League One	FA Cup	League Cup	League Trophy	Total
1	GK	(Portugal)	1	Joel Pereira	5	1	1	0	7
Total					5	1	1	0	7

=== Disciplinary record ===
As of match played 21 November 2026

Number	Nation	Position	Name	League One		FA Cup		League Cup		League Trophy		Total	
Number	Nation	Position	Name	Yellow card	Red card	Yellow card	Red card	Yellow card	Red card	Yellow card	Red card	Yellow card	Red card
1	(Portugal)	GK	Joel Pereira	1	0	0	0	0	0	0	0	1	0
3	(Montserrat)	DF	Jeriel Dorsett	1	0	0	0	1	0	0	0	2	0
4	(Zimbabwe)	MF	Andy Rinomhota	5	0	0	0	0	0	0	0	5	0
5	(England)	DF	Haydon Roberts	5	0	0	0	0	0	0	0	5	0
6	(Canada)	MF	Liam Fraser	1	0	0	0	0	0	1	0	2	0
8	(Wales)	MF	Charlie Savage	1	0	0	0	0	0	1	0	2	0
11	(Germany)	MF	Daniel Kyerewaa	0	0	1	0	0	0	0	0	1	0
14	(England)	MF	Randell Williams	1	0	0	0	1	0	0	0	2	0
15	(Republic of Ireland)	DF	Paudie O'Connor	5	0	0	0	0	0	0	0	5	0
16	(England)	DF	Benn Ward	1	0	0	0	0	0	0	0	1	0
19	(England)	FW	Kyreece Lisbie	5	0	0	0	0	0	0	0	5	0
28	(England)	MF	Josh Stokes	2	0	0	0	0	0	0	0	2	0
32	(Northern Ireland)	MF	Paddy Lane	1	0	0	0	0	0	0	0	1	0
39	(England)	DF	Ashqar Ahmed	0	0	1	0	0	0	0	0	1	0
42	(England)	DF	Boyd Beacroft	0	0	0	0	0	0	1	0	1	0
Players who left Reading during the season:
Total				29	0	2	0	2	0	3	0	36	0

== Awards ==
=== Player awards ===
==== EFL League One Player of the Month ====
Month	Player	Result	Ref.
September	(England) Jack Marriott	Won	

==== EFL League One Goal of the Month ====
Month	Player	Opposition	Result	Ref.
August	(England) Jack Marriott	Luton Town	Won	

==== PFA League One Fans' Player of the Month ====
Month	Player	Result	Ref.
September	(England) Jack Marriott	Won	

=== Manager awards ===
==== EFL League One Manager of the Month ====
Month	Manager	Result	Ref.
September	(England) Leam Richardson	Won	
