= Pirić =

Pirić is a surname. Notable people with the surname include:

- Anel Pirić (born 2004), Bosnian football player
- Denijal Pirić (born 1946), Bosnian football player
- Ivica Pirić (born 1989), Croatian football player
- Kenan Pirić (born 1994), Bosnian football player
