= Taylan Harris =

English footballer (born 2005)

Personal information
- Full name: Taylan Yusuf Kenneth Harris
- Date of birth: 30 October 2005 (age 21)
- Place of birth: Hounslow, England
- Height: 1.81 m (5 ft 11 in)
- Position: Forward

Team information
- Current team: Woking (on loan from Luton Town)
- Number: 20

Youth career
- –2023: Reading

Senior career*
Years	Team	Apps	(Gls)
2023–2024	Reading	0	(0)
2024–	Luton Town	0	(0)
2025–2026	→ Tranmere Rovers (loan)	13	(1)
2026	→ Braintree Town (loan)	5	(2)
2026–	→ Woking (loan)	7	(1)
- * Club domestic league appearances and goals as of 19:38, 11 October 2026 (UTC)

Taylan Yusuf Kenneth Harris (born 30 October 2005) is an English professional footballer who plays as a forward for National League club Woking, on loan from EFL League One club Luton Town.

== Career ==
Harris made his debut for Reading during their 9–0 away victory against Exeter City in the EFL Trophy group stage on 19 September 2023, coming on as a replacement for Ben Elliott in the 82nd minute and scoring the eighth goal of the game three minutes later. Harris was the 79th player to come through the club's academy to play for the first team.

=== Luton Town ===
On 1 February 2024, Harris joined Luton Town.

On 25 July 2025, Harris joined League Two side Tranmere Rovers on loan until January. In February 2026, he joined National League club Braintree Town on a one-month youth loan.

== Career statistics ==
As of 14 October 2026

Appearances and goals by club, season and competition
Club	Season	League			FA Cup		EFL Cup		Other		Total	
Club	Season	Division	Apps	Goals	Apps	Goals	Apps	Goals	Apps	Goals	Apps	Goals
Reading	2023–24	League One	0	0	0	0	0	0	1 (Note: Appearance(s) in EFL Trophy)	1	1	1
Luton Town	2023–24	Premier League	0	0	0	0	0	0	—		0	0
Luton Town	2024–25	Championship	0	0	0	0	0	0	—		0	0
Luton Town	2025–26	League One	0	0	—		—		—		0	0
Luton Town	2026–27	League One	0	0	0	0	0	0	0	0	0	0
Luton Town	Total		0	0	0	0	0	0	—		0	0
Tranmere Rovers (loan)	2025–26	League Two	13	1	1	0	1	0	4	0	19	1
Braintree Town (loan)	2025–26	National League	5	2	—		—		—		5	2
Woking (loan)	2026–27	National League	7	1	0	0	—		2 (Note: Appearance(s) in National League Cup)	1	9	2
Career total			25	4	1	0	1	0	7	2	34	6
