= FK Sarajevo B =

Association football club in Bosnia and Herzegovina

Sarajevo B
- Full name: Fudbalski klub Sarajevo B
- Nickname: Bordo-bijeli (The Maroon-Whites)
- Short name: FKS-B, SAR-B
- Founded: 6 July 2025; 4 months ago
- Ground: Butmir Training Centre
- Capacity: 3,021
- President: Ismir Mirvić
- Manager: Eldin Čengić
- League: League of Sarajevo Canton
Home colours	Away colours	Third colours

Fudbalski klub Sarajevo B, commonly known as Sarajevo B, is a Bosnian professional football team, which serves as the reserve side of FK Sarajevo. They compete in the League of Sarajevo Canton, the fourth division of Bosnian football, and play their home matches at the Butmir Training Centre main pitch.

After a thorough reorganization of its youth football system during the 2024-25 season, the club officially inaugurated their B team on 6 July 2025, thereby becoming the first club in the Bosnian league system to establish a dedicated B team, aimed at facilitating an easier transition for academy players and young players brought in from abroad into the senior squad.

In its inaugural season, Sarajevo B will compete in the League of Sarajevo Canton, with its stated objective being back-to-back-to-back promotions to the First League of the Federation of Bosnia and Herzegovina, Bosnia and Herzegovina's second-tier competition.

== Players ==
=== Current squad ===
As of 21 July 2025

Note: Flags indicate national team as defined under FIFA eligibility rules; some limited exceptions apply. Players may hold more than one non-FIFA nationality.

No.	Pos.	Nation	Player
—	GK	MNE	Danis Muković
—	GK	USA	Bryan Lau
—	GK	CMR	Walid Abdoulaziz
—	GK	BIH	Gennis Hamzić
—	DF	BEL	Jack Senga
—	DF	BIH	Ajdin Kobašević
—	DF	ZIM	Shane Maroodza
—	DF	FRA	Oumar Kamara
—	DF	BIH	Milan Tešanović
—	DF	ARG	Santiago Sabaris
—	DF	BIH	Andrei Jahić
—	DF	USA	Adam Kend
—	MF	BIH	Anel Pirić
—	MF	BIH	Armin Karišik

No.	Pos.	Nation	Player
—	MF	CRO	Bruno Putica
—	MF	TUN	Yassine Dridi
—	MF	BIH	Abdulkerim Mehmedspahić
—	MF	SRB	Danilo Novićević
—	MF	BIH	Muhammed Čolaković
—	FW	BIH	Said Duranović
—	FW	POR	Gelson Carlos Mundo da Rocha
—	FW	UKR	Renat Gerdelesko
—	FW	GRE	Nikolaos Dimitriadis
—	FW	BIH	Hamza Martinović
—	FW	BIH	Aleksa Popović
—	FW	BIH	Aldin Muzurović
—	FW	MLI	Salif Leintu

== Technical staff ==
As of 15 April 2025, the staff includes:

Current Staff
Position	Name
Manager	(Bosnia and Herzegovina) Eldin Čengić
Assistant coach	(Bosnia and Herzegovina) Emir Obuća
Assistant coach	(Bosnia and Herzegovina) Jasmin Nuhanović
Goalkeeping coach	(Bosnia and Herzegovina) Edin Hasanović
Video analyst	(Bosnia and Herzegovina) Kenan Handžić
Fitness coach	(Bosnia and Herzegovina) Emir Mustafović
Medical team coordinator	(Bosnia and Herzegovina) Dr. Reuf Karabeg
Senior Physiotherapist	(Bosnia and Herzegovina) Ismar Hadžibajrić
Physiotherapist	(Bosnia and Herzegovina) Mirza Marevac
Physiotherapist	(Bosnia and Herzegovina) Eldin Jarović
Team manager	(Bosnia and Herzegovina) Mirnesa Poturak
