= Jack Senga =

Belgian footballer

Personal information
- Full name: Jack Michel Dasquela Senga-Ngoyi
- Date of birth: 27 January 2004 (age 22)
- Place of birth: Belgium
- Height: 1.86 m (6 ft 1 in)
- Position: Central midfielder

Team information
- Current team: Zvijezda Gradačac (on loan from Sarajevo)
- Number: 6

Senior career*
Years	Team	Apps	(Gls)
2020–2025	Reading	1	(0)
2021	→ Maidenhead United (loan)	4	(0)
2023–2024	→ Ayr United (loan)	11	(0)
2025	Sarajevo B	0	(0)
2026–	Sarajevo	0	(0)
2026	→ Igman Konjic (loan)	6	(1)
2026	→ Dugopolje (loan)	1	(0)
2026–	→ Zvijezda Gradačac (loan)	3	(1)

International career
2019	Belgium U15	1	(0)
- * Club domestic league appearances and goals as of 29 September 2026

Jack Michel Dasquela Senga-Ngoyi (born 27 January 2004) is a Belgian professional footballer who plays as a central midfielder for First League of FBiH club Zvijezda Gradačac on loan from Sarajevo.

== Club career ==
=== Reading ===
On 19 August 2021, Senga joined Maidenhead United on a work experience loan deal from Reading.

On 25 March 2022, Senga signed his first professional contract with Reading, until the summer of 2024.

On 8 May 2023, the last day of the 2022–23 season, Senga made his debut for Reading in a 2–0 defeat, becoming the clubs 77th Academy graduate to play for the senior squad.

On 1 September 2023, Senga joined Ayr United on a loan until January 2024.

On 16 May 2025, Reading announced that Senga would leave the club when his contract expired on 30 June 2025.

=== Sarajevo ===
On 16 August 2025, it was reported that Senga had joined Premier League of Bosnia and Herzegovina club Sarajevo's reserve side Sarajevo B.

On 10 February 2026, Sarajevo announced that they had signed Senga to a one-and-a-half-year deal, after he'd spent the first half of the 2025–26 season with Sarajevo B, and that Senga had been loaned out to Igman Konjic for the remainder of the 2025–26 season.

On 23 July 2026, NK Dugopolje announced that they had signed Senga on a season-long loan deal from Sarajevo.

On 8 September 2026, Zvijezda Gradačac announced that they had signed Senga on loan until 30 June 2027.

== International career ==
In April 2019, Senga made one appearance for the Belgium under-15 team against Wales.

== Personal life ==
Born in Belgium, Senga is of DR Congolese descent.

== Career statistics ==
=== Club ===
As of match played 26 September 2026

Appearances and goals by club, season and competition
Club	Season	League			National cup (Note: Includes FA Cup, Scottish Cup)		League cup (Note: Includes EFL Cup, Scottish League Cup)		Continental		Other		Total	
Club	Season	Division	Apps	Goals	Apps	Goals	Apps	Goals	Apps	Goals	Apps	Goals	Apps	Goals
Reading	2021–22	EFL Championship	0	0	0	0	0	0	—				0	0
Reading	2022–23	EFL Championship	1	0	0	0	0	0	—				1	0
Reading	2023–24	EFL League One	0	0	0	0	1	0	—				1	0
Reading	2024–25	EFL League One	0	0	1	0	0	0	—		2 (Note: Appearances in EFL Trophy)	0	3	0
Reading	Total		1	0	1	0	1	0	0	0	2	0	5	0
Maidenhead United (loan)	2021–22	National League	4	0	0	0	0	0	—		0	0	4	0
Ayr United (loan)	2023–24	Scottish Championship	11	0	0	0	0	0	—		1 (Note: Appearances in the Scottish Challenge Cup)	0	12	0
Sarajevo	2025–26	Bosnian Premier League	0	0	0	0	—		0	0	0	0	0	0
Sarajevo	2026–27	Bosnian Premier League	0	0	0	0	—		0	0	0	0	0	0
Sarajevo	Total		0	0	0	0	0	0	0	0	0	0	0	0
Igman Konjic (loan)	2025–26	First League of FBiH	6	1	—		—		—		—		6	1
Dugopolje (loan)	2026–27	Prva NL	1	0	0	0	—		—		—		1	0
Zvijezda Gradačac (loan)	2026–27	First League of FBiH	3	1	0	0	—		—		—		3	1
Career total			20	1	1	0	1	0	0	0	3	0	25	1
