= Caylan Vickers =

English footballer (born 2004)

Personal information
- Full name: Caylan David Vickers
- Date of birth: 22 December 2004 (age 21)
- Place of birth: Windsor, England
- Height: 1.72 m (5 ft 8 in)
- Position: Winger

Team information
- Current team: Burton Albion
- Number: 18

Youth career
- Reading
- 2024–2025: Brighton & Hove Albion

Senior career*
Years	Team	Apps	(Gls)
2023–2024	Reading	14	(1)
2024–2026	Brighton & Hove Albion	0	(0)
2025	→ Mansfield Town (loan)	19	(2)
2025–2026	→ Barnsley (loan)	15	(2)
2026	→ Wigan Athletic (loan)	11	(1)
2026–	Burton Albion	1	(1)
- * Club domestic league appearances and goals as of 2 September 2026 (UTC)

Caylan David Vickers (born 22 December 2004) is an English professional footballer who plays as a winger for EFL League One club Burton Albion.

== Career ==
On 17 May 2023, Vickers was offered his first professional contract by Reading. On 1 July 2023, Reading confirmed that Vickers had signed his first professional contract with the club.

Vickers made his professional debut with Reading in a 1–0 EFL League One loss to Peterborough United on 5 August 2023. His first league start came on 15 August 2023, in a 1-0 home win against Cheltenham Town.

Vickers scored the 8th goal in a 0-9 victory over Exeter City in the EFL Trophy on 19 September 2023, the biggest win in the club's history.

On 1 February 2024, Vickers transferred to the Brighton & Hove Albion Academy for an undisclosed fee, signing a three-and-a-half-year contract.

On 3 February 2025, Vickers joined EFL League One club Mansfield Town on loan until the end of the season.

On 21 July 2025, Vickers joined EFL League One club Barnsley on a season-long loan. He scored his first goal for the club in the 3-2 home win against Burton. He grabbed his second goal of the season in the 1-0 away win at Peterborough United. On 9 January 2026, Brighton announced that Vickers had returned from his loan deal with Barnsley.

On 1 September 2026, Vickers joined EFL League One club Burton Albion.

== Personal life ==
Born in England, Vickers has Indian and Ugandan heritage through his mother and great-grandparents, who lived in Uganda before relocating to the UK during Idi Amin's regime.

He is eligible to represent England, India or Uganda.

== Career statistics ==
=== Club ===
As of match played 2 May 2026

Appearances and goals by club, season and competition
Club	Season	League			National Cup		League Cup		Other		Total	
Club	Season	Division	Apps	Goals	Apps	Goals	Apps	Goals	Apps	Goals	Apps	Goals
Reading	2023–24	EFL League One	14	1	1	0	2	0	5 (Note: Appearances and goals in EFL Trophy)	2	22	3
Brighton & Hove Albion U21s	2023–24	—							0	0	0	0
Brighton & Hove Albion U21s	2024–25	—							3	1	3	1
Brighton & Hove Albion U21s	Total	—							3	1	3	1
Mansfield Town (loan)	2024–25	EFL League One	19	2	0	0	0	0	0	0	19	2
Barnsley (loan)	2025–26	EFL League One	15	2	1	0	2	0	4	0	22	2
Wigan Athletic (loan)	2025–26	EFL League One	11	1	0	0	0	0	0	0	11	1
Burton Albion	2026–27	EFL League One	0	0	0	0	0	0	0	0	0	0
Career total			59	6	2	0	4	0	12	3	77	9
