= 2023–24 Reading F.C. season =

153rd season in existence of Reading FC

Reading
2023–24 season
- Owner: Dai Yongge and Dai Xiu Li
- Manager: Rubén Sellés
- Stadium: Madejski Stadium
- League One: 17th
- FA Cup: Second round (eliminated by Eastleigh)
- EFL Cup: Second round (eliminated by Ipswich Town)
- EFL Trophy: Round of 16 (eliminated by Brighton & Hove Albion U21)
- Top goalscorer: League: Sam Smith (15); All: Harvey Knibbs (16); Sam Smith (16)
- Highest home attendance: 18,480 (vs Blackpool, 27 April 2024, League One)
- Lowest home attendance: 1,809 (vs Charlton Athletic; 6 December 2023, EFL Trophy)
- Average home league attendance: 13,115
- Biggest win: 9–0 (vs. Exeter City (A), 19 September 2023, EFL Trophy)
- Biggest defeat: 0–4 (vs. Charlton Athletic (A), 21 October 2023, League One)
Home colours	Away colours	Third colours
- All statistics correct as of 27 April 2024.

The 2023–24 season was the 153rd season in the existence of Reading and their first season in the League One since the 2001–02 season following their relegation from the Championship the previous season and covers the period from 1 July 2023 to 30 June 2024. Reading finished the season in 17th position on 53 points, following a six-point deduction over the course of the season. In the FA Cup, Reading defeated Milton Keynes Dons before being eliminated by Eastleigh in the second round. In the EFL Cup, Reading defeated Millwall before being eliminated by Ipswich Town on penalties in the second round. In the EFL Trophy, Reading won all three of their group games, scoring 19 goals in the process, before being eliminated by Brighton & Hove Albion U21 in the Round of 16.

== Season events ==
=== Pre-season ===
At the end of the previous season, Reading announced an update on out of contract players for the upcoming season. Scott Dann, Luke Southwood, Shane Long, Liam Moore, Lucas Joao and Dejan Tetek all departed the club at the end of June, whilst Nesta Guinness-Walker had a clause activated in his contract that saw him retained for the current season. Additionally, Yakou Méïté, Amadou Mbengue and Junior Hoilett were all offered new contracts.

From the under-21 squad, Coniah Boyce-Clarke was offered a three-year contract, and John Clarke a one-year contract. Whist Hamid Abdel-Salam, Adrian Akande, Harvey Collins, Matt Rowley and Michael Stickland all had clauses in their contracts triggered for the 2023–24 season. Matthew Carson and Jeriel Dorsett where also offered new contracts. Lui Bradbury, Ethan Burnett, Josh Green, Nahum Melvin-Lambert, Kian Leavy, Claudio Osorio and Rashawn Scott all left the club's academy ranks at the end of their contract.

Reading offered first professional contracts to Harvey Maudner, Jacob Borgnis, Tom Norcott, Caylan Vickers, Jeremiah Okine-Peters and Basil Tuma, whilst David Nyarko, Ryley Campbell, Kyle Daniel-Spray, Harrison Furlong, Louis Hutchings, Troy Murray, Zion Nditi and Aston Greaver all left the club.

On 18 May, Reading announced their first pre-season friendlies of the season: an away trip to Bristol City, to be played behind closed-doors at the Robins High Performance Centre on 12 July, followed by an away trip to Sutton United on 15 July. Another two pre-season friendlies were announced on 31 May: a behind closed-doors match against Queens Park Rangers would be played on 25 July, followed by a match against Swansea City at the Madejski Stadium on 29 July.

On 11 June, Qatar Stars League club Al-Markhiya announced the signing of Naby Sarr.

Reading were charged by the EFL on 16 June with failing to pay their players on time and in full, in October and November 2022, and April 2023, and, later, with non-payment of taxes. If the charges are proven, Reading will start the 2023–24 League One season with points already deducted.

With the opening of the Transfer Window on 21 June, Reading confirmed that George Pușcaș had left the club join Genoa for an undisclosed fee, which would paid to the club in instalments, and that Yakou Méïté had turned down a new contract with the club. Reading were also drawn into Group G of the EFL Trophy alongside Exeter City and Swindon Town. This came a day before the league fixtures were announced: Reading would open their account with a home fixture against Peterborough United and ending the season by hosting Blackpool. Two cup draws additionally took place that day: the EFL Trophy group was completed with Arsenal U21 being Reading's final opponents. before Reading were drawn away at Millwall in the first round of the EFL Cup.

On 27 June, Reading confirmed that Tom Ince had left the club to sign for Watford for an undisclosed fee.

=== July ===
On 1 July, Reading announced that they had signed new contracts with John Clarke, Matthew Carson and Hamid Abdel Salam, and that scholars Tom Norcott, Caylan Vickers, Harvey Maudner, Jeremiah Okine-Peters, Basil Tuma and Jacob Borgnis had all signed their first professional contract with the club.

On 11 July, Reading confirmed that their academy had been reassigned as a Category One academy a year after the status had been downgraded the previous year, meaning their under-21s would play in Premier League 2 for the upcoming season. Later the same day, Jeriel Dorsett signed a new one-year contract with the club, until the summer of 2024, whilst Geneiro Maragh joined the U21 team on a similar deal.

Harvey Knibbs was signed on a free-transfer to a three-year contract on 13 July, with Rubén Sellés being formally confirmed as the club's First Team Manager, after his visa application was successful, the subsequent day. He had previously been announced by the club on 26 June, subject the approval of his visa.

On 17 July, Reading announced had Sam Smith signed three-year contract to complete a free transfer to the club. He had been released by the club two years prior. Amadou Mbengue signed a new two-year contract with the club two days after.

On 21 July, Reading announced the signing of Lewis Wing to a three-year contract, after he'd left Wycombe Wanderers at the end of the previous season. The following day, after Reading's 4–2 friendly defeat to Southampton, Reading announced the signing of Charlie Savage to a four-year contract from Manchester United.

On 27 July, Louie Holzman joined League of Ireland Premier Division club Bohemian on loan until the end of their league season.

=== August ===
On 4 August, Reading announced the signing of Tivonge Rushesha to a one-year contract, and the signing of Harlee Dean to a two-year contract.

On 7 August, Reading announced the signing of Tyler Bindon to a two-year contract from Los Angeles FC.

On 9 August, Reading announced the signing of David Button, who'd left West Bromwich Albion the previous day, to a two-year contract. The following day, 10 August, Jökull Andrésson extended his contract with Reading until the summer of 2025 and joined Carlisle United on loan for the season, whilst Coniah Boyce-Clarke also signed a new two-year contract with the club having been on a week-to-week contract since his previous contract expired at the end of the previous season.

On 15 August, Reading announced the signing of Ben Elliott from Chelsea, to a three-year contract.

On 16 August, Reading were docked one point by the EFL for failing to pay their players on time on three separate occasions during the 2022–23 season, with a further three points suspended until the end of the season. Later the same day, Reading announced the season-long loan signing of Paul Mukairu from Copenhagen.

On 31 August, Andy Carroll triggered a release clause in his contract to terminate his deal with Reading with immediate effect.

=== September ===
On 1 September, transfer deadline day, Dean Bouzanis re-joined Sutton United on loan until January 2024, whilst Jack Senga also joined Ayr United on a loan until January. Also on 1 September, Reading announced the singings of John Ryan, Charlie Wellens, Billie Clark and Jayden Wareham to their U21 squad for the season, that Dom Ballard had joined the club on loan for the season from Southampton with Thierry Rohart-Brown going in the opposite direction for an undisclosed fee, and the signing of Clinton Mola to a one-year contract.

On 9 September, Reading announced the signing of free-agent Joel Pereira to a one-year contract with the option of a further year.

On 13 September, Reading triggered their suspended three-point penalty and were deducted three points by the EFL after owner Dai Yongge failed to deposit 125% of the club's monthly wage bill into a designated account by Tuesday 12 September 2023, as ordered by the Independent Disciplinary Commission on 15 August 2023.

=== October ===
On 23 October, Reading announced that their academy had signed a partnership with League of Ireland First Division club Wexford that will see coaches and potential academy players spending time at the club.

On 31 October, Reading were served another HMRC winding-up petition over unpaid taxes.

=== November ===
On 1 November, Reading were referred to an EFL independent disciplinary commission regarding unpaid HMRC debts owed in September and October 2023, with an EFL hearing against Dai Yongge was scheduled for the end of November.

On 25 November, Reading secured a 2–1 victory over Wycombe Wanderers at Adams Park to end the clubs 378 day wait for a league win away from home, which had seen them draw two and lost eighteen games. On 28 November, Reading defeated Carlisle United, 5–1, to secure back to back wins for the first time since August, whilst in a post match interview Head Coach Rubén Sellés confirmed that Dom Ballard would be out for the season after snapping his Patellar tendon.

=== December ===
On 7 December, Jahmari Clarke joined Boreham Wood on loan until 28 January 2024.

On 18 December, Ovie Ejaria left the club by mutual consent.

On 19 December, Dai Yongge was fined £20,000 for Reading's wages failures; the EFL had recommended a 12-month ban from all football activities, but an independent disciplinary commission opted not to enforce it. A further £50,000 fine was suspended until 12 January 2024.

=== January ===
On 5 January, Reading announced the departure of Director of Player Development, Eddie Niedzwiecki, and Assistant Head Coach, Andrew Sparkes, as part of a cost-cutting restructure of the club.

On 13 January, Reading's EFL League One game against Port Vale was abandoned after 16 minutes due to a pitch invasion by the fans in protest against owner Dai Yongge.

On 15 January, the EFL imposed their suspended £50,000 fine on Dai Yongge for failing to meet financial deadlines over wages.

On 17 January, Reading announced that Tom Holmes had signed for Premier League club Luton Town for an undisclosed fee, but would remain at the club on loan until the end of the season.

On 23 January, Reading announced the return of Jack Senga from his loan deal with Ayr United, whilst also confirming that goalkeepers Dean Bouzanis and Matt Rowley had had their respective loans extended to the end of the season. Later on the same day, the EFL announced that Reading's abandoned game against Port Vale on 13 January would be replayed in full on 20 February, with the club receiving a suspended 3-point penalty.

On 24 January, Nesta Guinness-Walker joined fellow League One club Stevenage on loan for the remainder of the season.

On 25 January, Nelson Abbey left the club to sign for Olympiacos for an undisclosed fee.

On 30 January, Tom McIntyre left the club to sign for Portsmouth for an undisclosed fee.

=== February ===
On 1 February, transfer deadline day, Taylan Harris and Caylan Vickers left Reading on permanent deals to join Luton Town and Brighton & Hove Albion respectively for undisclosed fees, whilst Zane Monlouis joined on loan from Arsenal for the remainder of the season.

On 27 February, Reading were deducted another 2 points for late HMRC payments, whilst owner Dai Yongge was handed a £100,000 fine for his repeated failures to deposit an amount equal to 125% of the club's forecast monthly wage bill in a designated account.

=== March ===
On 11 March, Matt Rowley ended his loan deal with Beaconsfield Town and joined Dover Athletic on loan for the remainder of the season.

On 14 March, Reading announced they were holding talks with Wycombe Wanderers over the sale of Bearwood Park, but Wycombe put the talks "on hold" after learning that "planning limitations allowed only Reading to use the grounds". A week later, Nigel Howe said there have been "approaches from around the world" to buy Reading. Five days later, on 26th March, Reading were reported to be in "exclusive negotiations" with a buyer to agree final terms for Dai Yongge's shareholding, the stadium and the training ground; closing the deal could take up to two months.

On 16 March, Jahmari Clarke joined Yeovil Town and on 28 March, Tom Norcott joined Beaconsfield Town, both on loan for the remainder of the season.

=== April ===
On 5 April, Reading announced that Academy graduate Shay Spencer had signed his first professional contract with the club, a one-year deal until the summer of 2025.

On 27 April, the final day of the season, Reading announced following their 3–2 victory over Blackpool, that Lewis Wing had won their player of the season award with Tyler Bindon second and Harvey Knibbs third.

=== May ===
On 8 May, Reading released their retained and release list for the end of the season. Femi Azeez, Kelvin Ehibhatiomhan, Jayden Wareham, Michael Craig, Jeriel Dorsett and Joel Pereira all had one-year optional extensions activated by the club, whilst Kelvin Abrefa and Tivonge Rushesha were offered new contracts with their current deals expiring on 30 June. Reading also confirmed that Matthew Carson, Nesta Guinness-Walker, Sam Hutchinson and Clinton Mola would all be leaving the club when their contracts expire on 30 June.

On 23 May, Reading released their retained and released list for their Under 18 and Under 21 teams. For the Under 21 team, Jacob Borgnis, John Clarke, Jeremiah Okine-Peters, John Ryan and Charlie Wellens all had one-year contract extensions exercised, Adrian Akande, Matthew Rowley, Jack Senga, Michael Stickland and Basil Tuma had all been offered new contracts, whilst Hamid Abdel-Salam, Billie Clark, Jahmari Clarke, Harvey Collins, Ajani Giscombe, Geneiro Maragh, Harvey Maudner, Sam Paul and Ben Purcell would all leave the club. For the Under 18 team, Joseph Barough, Boyd Beacroft and Harrison Rhone all were offered new contracts, whilst Toby Mawer rejected a contract offer in order to accept a College Sponsorship place in the United States and Tyler Field, Matthew Goulding, William Gutierrez-Ramirez, Jayden Porter-Atkinson, Jack Timberlake and Aaron White would all leave the club.

=== June ===
On 27 June, Reading announced that they had signed a new two-year contract with Kelvin Abrefa.

== Squad ==
As of match played 27 April 2024

No.	Name	Nationality	Position	Date of birth (age)	Signed from	Signed in	Contract ends	Apps.	Goals
Goalkeepers
1	David Button	(England)	GK	27 February 1989 (aged 35)	Unattached	2023	2025	38	0
22	Joel Pereira (Note: Joel Pereira was born in Switzerland, but qualified to represent Portugal, representing them at youth level between 2012 and 2018.)	(Portugal)	GK	28 June 1996 (aged 27)	Unattached	2023	2025	14	0
31	Coniah Boyce-Clarke (Note: Coniah Boyce-Clarke was born in England, but qualified to represent Jamaica, and made his international debut for Jamaica U20 in June 2022.)	(Jamaica)	GK	1 March 2003 (aged 21)	Academy	2019	2025	4	0
Defenders
2	Clinton Mola	(England)	DF	15 March 2001 (aged 23)	Unattached	2023	2024	35	0
3	Tom Holmes	(England)	DF	12 March 2000 (aged 24)	on loan from Luton Town	2024	2024	133	1
6	Harlee Dean	(England)	DF	26 July 1991 (aged 32)	Unattached	2023	2025	16	1
14	Zane Monlouis (Note: Zane Monlouis was born in England, but qualified to represent Jamaica, and was called up for Jamaica U23 in March 2024.)	(Jamaica)	DF	16 October 2003 (aged 20)	on loan from Arsenal	2024	2024	1	0
17	Andy Yiadom (Note: Andy Yiadom was born in Holloway, England, but qualified to represent Ghana and made his international debut for Ghana in January 2017. He previously represented England at C level.)	(Ghana)	DF	2 December 1991 (aged 32)	Barnsley	2018	2025	208	4
20	Jeriel Dorsett (Note: Jeriel Dorsett was born in Enfield, England, but qualified to represent Montserrat and made his international debut for Montserrat in September 2023. He previously represented England at U18 level.)	(Montserrat)	DF	4 May 2002 (aged 21)	Academy	2018	2025	29	1
24	Tyler Bindon	(New Zealand)	DF	27 January 2005 (aged 19)	Los Angeles FC	2023	2025	44	2
27	Amadou Mbengue	(Senegal)	DF	5 January 2002 (aged 22)	Unattached	2022	2025	72	2
Midfielders
4	Ben Elliott (Note: Ben Elliott was born in Kingston upon Thames, England, but qualified to represent Cameroon and made his international debut for Cameroon in June 2023. He previously represented England at U15 & U16 level.)	(Cameroon)	MF	5 November 2002 (aged 21)	Chelsea	2023	2026	42	1
8	Charlie Savage (Note: Charlie Savage was born in Leicester, England, but qualified to represent Wales, representing them at U17, U18, U19, U21 and senior level.)	(Wales)	MF	2 May 2003 (aged 20)	Manchester United	2023	2027	45	5
23	Sam Hutchinson	(England)	MF	3 August 1989 (aged 34)	Unattached	2022	2024	26	0
29	Lewis Wing	(England)	MF	23 June 1995 (aged 28)	Unattached	2023	2026	49	11
36	Michael Craig (Note: Michael Craig was born in Barnet, England, but qualified to represent Scotland, representing them at U16, U17, U19 and U21 level.)	(Scotland)	MF	16 April 2003 (aged 21)	Unattached	2022	2025	41	0
Forwards
7	Harvey Knibbs	(England)	FW	26 April 1999 (aged 25)	Unattached	2023	2026	53	16
9	Dom Ballard	(England)	FW	1 April 2005 (aged 19)	on loan from Southampton	2023	2024	12	5
10	Sam Smith	(England)	FW	8 March 1998 (aged 26)	Unattached	2023	2026	48	18
11	Femi Azeez (Note: Azeez was born in Westminster, England, but qualified to represent Nigeria and made his international debut for Nigeria in May 2026.)	(England)	FW	5 June 2001 (aged 22)	Wealdstone	2019	2025	88	11
12	Paul Mukairu	(Nigeria)	FW	18 January 2000 (aged 24)	on loan from Copenhagen	2023	2024	38	6
15	Kelvin Ehibhatiomhan	(Nigeria)	FW	23 April 2002 (aged 22)	Academy	2021	2025	57	13
U21
19	Jayden Wareham	(England)	FW	13 May 2003 (aged 20)	Unattached	2023	2025	11	0
28	Mamadi Camará	(Guinea-Bissau)	FW	31 December 2003 (aged 20)	Feirense	2020		23	1
30	Kelvin Abrefa (Note: Kelvin Abrefa was born in Italy to Ghanaian parents, going on to make his debut for Ghana U20 in June 2022.)	(Ghana)	DF	9 December 2003 (aged 20)	Academy	2020	2026	26	1
33	John Clarke	(Republic of Ireland)	DF	24 April 2004 (aged 20)	Port Vale	2022	2025	4	0
34	Louie Holzman	(England)	DF	16 November 2003 (aged 20)	Academy	2020		2	0
35	Jack Senga	(Belgium)	MF	27 January 2004 (aged 20)	Academy	2020	2024	2	0
37	Adrian Akande	(Nigeria)	FW	22 October 2003 (aged 20)	Unattached	2022	2024	0	0
38	Michael Stickland	(England)	DF	9 November 2003 (aged 20)	Academy	2020	2024	4	0
40	Tivonge Rushesha	(Zimbabwe)	MF	24 July 2002 (aged 21)	Unattached	2023	2024(+1)	11	0
41	Harvey Collins	(England)	GK	5 November 2002 (aged 21)	Academy	2019	2024	0	0
43	Hamid Abdel-Salam	(England)	MF	19 October 2003 (aged 20)	Academy	2020	2024	0	0
44	Sam Paul	(England)	DF	13 October 2003 (aged 20)	Academy	2020		0	0
45	Benjamin Purcell	(Wales)	MF	25 August 2004 (aged 19)	Academy	2020		0	0
46	Jacob Borgnis	(New Zealand)	MF	6 September 2004 (aged 19)	Academy	2021	2025	0	0
47	Matthew Carson	(England)	DF	17 October 2002 (aged 21)	Unattached	2023	2024	17	0
48	Basil Tuma (Note: Basil Tuma was born in Uganda, but qualified to represent Malta, and made his international debut for Malta U20 in November 2022.)	(Malta)	FW	24 April 2005 (aged 19)	Academy	2021	2024	5	0
49	Generio Maragh	(England)	DF	3 February 2003 (aged 21)	Unattached	2023	2024	0	0
50	Ajani Giscombe	(England)	MF	12 May 2004 (aged 19)	Academy	2021		0	0
52	Harvey Maudner	(England)	FW	22 June 2004 (aged 19)	Academy	2020	2024	0	0
54	Jeremiah Okine-Peters	(England)	FW	16 December 2004 (aged 19)	Academy	2021	2025	0	0
56	Billie Clark	(England)	FW	19 July 2004 (aged 19)	Unattached	2023	2024	0	0
57	John Ryan	(Republic of Ireland)	DF	21 January 2004 (aged 20)	Sassuolo	2023	2025	0	0
58	Charlie Wellens	(England)	MF	5 December 2002 (aged 21)	Unattached	2023	2025	1	0
	Boyd Beacroft	(England)	DF	14 February 2003 (aged 21)	Academy	2021		0	0
U18
59	Ashqar Ahmed	(England)	DF	31 August 2007 (aged 16)	Academy	2023		0	0
	Toby Mawer	(Wales)	GK	20 January 2005 (aged 19)	Academy	2023		0	0
	Harrison Rhone	(England)	GK	25 March 2006 (aged 18)	Academy	2021		0	0
	Tyler Field	(England)	DF	23 November 2005 (aged 18)	Academy	2023		0	0
	Matthew Goulding	(England)	DF		Academy	2023		0	0
	William Gutierrez Ramirez	(England)	DF	12 February 2006 (aged 18)	Academy	2023		0	0
	Abraham Kanu	(Sierra Leone)	DF	3 July 2005 (aged 18)	Academy	2021		0	0
	Aaron White	(England)	DF	22 September 2005 (aged 18)	Academy	2023		0	0
	Joseph Barough	(England)	MF	3 April 2006 (aged 18)	Academy	2023		0	0
	Denim Nnamudi	(England)	MF	7 July 2006 (aged 17)	Academy	2023		0	0
	Jayden Porter-Atkinson	(England)	MF	24 August 2006 (aged 17)	Academy	2023		0	0
	Shay Spencer	(England)	MF	13 October 2005 (aged 18)	Academy	2022	2025	0	0
	Jack Timberlake	(England)	FW	22 October 2005 (aged 18)	Academy	2023		0	0
Out on loan
18	Nesta Guinness-Walker	(England)	DF	14 September 1999 (aged 24)	Unattached	2022	2024	41	0
21	Dean Bouzanis	(Australia)	GK	2 October 1990 (aged 33)	Sutton United	2022	2025	9	0
25	Jökull Andrésson	(Iceland)	GK	25 August 2001 (aged 22)	Academy	2018	2025	0	0
39	Jahmari Clarke (Note: Jahmari Clarke was born in England, but qualified to represent Jamaica, and made his international debut for Jamaica U20 in June 2022.)	(Jamaica)	FW	17 August 2003 (aged 20)	Academy	2020		14	2
51	Matt Rowley	(England)	GK	14 October 2003 (aged 20)	Academy	2020	2024	0	0
61	Tom Norcott	(England)	GK	3 January 2005 (aged 19)	Academy	2021	2024	1	0
Left during the season
5	Tom McIntyre (Note: Tom McIntyre was born in Reading, England, but qualified to represent Scotland, representing them at U17, U20 and U21 level.)	(Scotland)	DF	6 November 1998 (aged 25)	Academy	2016	2024	117	7
9	Andy Carroll	(England)	FW	6 January 1989 (aged 35)	Unattached	2022	2024	42	11
14	Ovie Ejaria	(England)	MF	18 November 1997 (aged 26)	Liverpool	2020	2024	127	9
32	Nelson Abbey	(England)	DF	28 August 2003 (aged 20)	Academy	2019		31	0
55	Taylan Harris	(England)	FW	30 October 2005 (aged 18)	Academy	2023		1	1
42	Caylan Vickers	(England)	FW	22 December 2004 (aged 19)	Academy	2021	2024	22	3
	Ayyuba Jambang	(England)	DF	16 October 2004 (aged 19)	Unattached	2022		0	0
	Thierry Rohart-Brown	(England)	MF	2 June 2007 (aged 16)	Academy	2023		0	0

== Transfers ==
For those players sold, released or contract ended before the start of this season, see 2022–23 Reading F.C. season.

=== In ===
Date	Position	Nationality	Name	From	Fee	Ref.
13 July 2023	FW	(England)	Harvey Knibbs	Unattached	Free	
17 July 2023	FW	(England)	Sam Smith	Unattached	Free	
21 July 2023	MF	(England)	Lewis Wing	Unattached	Free	
22 July 2023	MF	(Wales)	Charlie Savage	Manchester United	Undisclosed	
4 August 2023	MF	(Zimbabwe)	Tivonge Rushesha	Unattached	Free	
4 August 2023	DF	(England)	Harlee Dean	Unattached	Free	
7 August 2023	DF	(New Zealand)	Tyler Bindon	Los Angeles FC	Undisclosed	
9 August 2023	GK	(England)	David Button	Unattached	Free	
15 August 2023	MF	(Cameroon)	Ben Elliott	Chelsea	Undisclosed	
1 September 2023	DF	(Republic of Ireland)	John Ryan	Sassuolo	Free	
1 September 2023	MF	(England)	Charlie Wellens	Unattached	Free	
1 September 2023	FW	(England)	Billie Clark	Unattached	Free	
1 September 2023	FW	(England)	Jayden Wareham	Unattached	Free	
1 September 2023	DF	(England)	Clinton Mola	Unattached	Free	
9 September 2023	GK	(Portugal)	Joel Pereira	Unattached	Free	

=== Loans in ===
Start date	Position	Nationality	Name	From	End date	Ref.
16 August 2023	FW	(Nigeria)	Paul Mukairu	Copenhagen	End of season	
1 September 2023	FW	(England)	Dom Ballard	Southampton	End of season	
17 January 2024	DF	(England)	Tom Holmes	Luton Town	End of season	
1 February 2024	DF	(Jamaica)	Zane Monlouis	Arsenal	End of season	

=== Out ===
Date	Position	Nationality	Name	To	Fee	Ref.
1 September 2023	MF	(England)	Thierry Rohart-Brown	Southampton	Undisclosed	
5 September 2023	DF	(England)	Ayyuba Jambang-Brown	Ipswich Town	Undisclosed	
17 January 2024	DF	(England)	Tom Holmes	Luton Town	Undisclosed	
25 January 2024	DF	(England)	Nelson Abbey	Olympiacos	Undisclosed	
30 January 2024	DF	(Scotland)	Tom McIntyre	Portsmouth	Undisclosed	
1 February 2024	FW	(England)	Taylan Harris	Luton Town	Undisclosed	
1 February 2024	MF	(England)	Caylan Vickers	Brighton & Hove Albion U21s	Undisclosed	

=== Loans out ===
Start date	Position	Nationality	Name	To	End date	Ref.
27 July 2023	DF	(England)	Louie Holzman	Bohemian	November 2023	
10 August 2023	GK	(Iceland)	Jökull Andrésson	Carlisle United	End of Season	
1 September 2023	GK	(Australia)	Dean Bouzanis	Sutton United	End of Season	
1 September 2023	MF	(Belgium)	Jack Senga	Ayr United	22 January 2024	
8 September 2023	GK	(England)	Matt Rowley	Beaconsfield Town	11 March 2024	
7 December 2023	FW	(Jamaica)	Jahmari Clarke	Boreham Wood	28 January 2024	
24 January 2024	DF	(England)	Nesta Guinness-Walker	Stevenage	End of Season	
11 March 2024	GK	(England)	Matt Rowley	Dover Athletic	End of Season	
16 March 2024	FW	(Jamaica)	Jahmari Clarke	Yeovil Town	End of Season	
28 March 2024	GK	(England)	Tom Norcott	Beaconsfield Town	End of Season	

=== Released ===
Date	Position	Nationality	Name	Joined	Date	Ref
31 August 2023	FW	(England)	Andy Carroll	Amiens	1 September 2023	
18 December 2023	MF	(England)	Ovie Ejaria	Real Oviedo	13 August 2025	
30 June 2024	GK	(England)	Harvey Collins	Maidenhead United	5 August 2024	
30 June 2024	GK	(Wales)	Toby Mawer	West Virginia Mountaineers	1 August 2024	
30 June 2024	GK	(England)	Harrison Rhone	New Contract	5 July 2024	
30 June 2024	GK	(England)	Matthew Rowley	New Contract	5 July 2024	
30 June 2024	DF	(England)	Boyd Beacroft	New Contract	5 July 2024	
30 June 2024	DF	(England)	Matthew Carson	Grimsby Town	1 July 2024	
30 June 2024	DF	(England)	Tyler Field	Eastleigh		
30 June 2024	DF	(England)	Matthew Goulding	Frome Town	24 July 2024	
30 June 2024	DF	(England)	Nesta Guinness-Walker	Northampton Town	27 September 2024	
30 June 2024	DF	(England)	William Gutierrez-Ramirez	Bromley		
30 June 2024	DF	(England)	Geneiro Maragh	Barking	10 December 2024	
30 June 2024	DF	(England)	Clinton Mola	Bristol Rovers	1 July 2024	
30 June 2024	DF	(England)	Sam Paul	Havant & Waterlooville	20 September 2024	
30 June 2024	DF	(England)	Michael Stickland	New Contract	5 July 2024	
30 June 2024	DF	(England)	Aaron White	Slough Town	4 September 2024	
30 June 2024	DF	(Sudan)	Hamid Abdel-Salam	Potters Bar Town	9 August 2024	
30 June 2024	MF	(Belgium)	Jack Senga	New Contract	5 July 2024	
30 June 2024	FW	(Nigeria)	Adrian Akande	New Contract	5 July 2024	
30 June 2024	MF	(England)	Joseph Barough	New Contract	5 July 2024	
30 June 2024	MF	(England)	Ajani Giscombe	Hanwell Town	27 March 2025	
30 June 2024	MF	(England)	Sam Hutchinson	AFC Wimbledon	10 December 2024	
30 June 2024	MF	(England)	Jayden Porter-Atkinson	Marlow	5 September 2024	
30 June 2024	MF	(Malta)	Basil Tuma	New Contract	5 July 2024	
30 June 2024	MF	(Wales)	Ben Purcell	Bracknell Town		
30 June 2024	MF	(Zimbabwe)	Tivonge Rushesha	New Contract	4 July 2024	
30 June 2024	FW	(England)	Billie Clark	Chichester City	24 August 2024	
30 June 2024	FW	(England)	Harvey Maudner	Marlow	6 September 2024	
30 June 2024	FW	(England)	Jack Timberlake	Slough Town		
30 June 2024	FW	(Jamaica)	Jahmari Clarke	Wealdstone	17 August 2024	

=== Trial ===
Date from	Position	Nationality	Name	Last club	Date to	Ref.
June 2023	FW	(England)	Harvey Knibbs	Cambridge United	13 July 2023	
June 2023	FW	(England)	Theo Walcott	Southampton		
July 2023	DF	(New Zealand)	Tyler Bindon	Los Angeles FC	7 August 2023	
July 2023	MF	(England)	Luke Amos	Queens Park Rangers		
July 2023	MF	(France)	Oan Djorkaeff	Kriens		
July 2023	MF	(Republic of Ireland)	Olamide Shodipo	Queens Park Rangers		
July 2023	MF	(Zimbabwe)	Tivonge Rushesha	Swansea City	4 August 2023	
July 2023	FW	(England)	Jayden Wareham	Chelsea	1 September 2023	
July 2023	DF	(Republic of Ireland)	John Ryan	Sassuolo	1 September 2023	

== Friendlies ==
8 July 2023	AFC Wimbledon	1–0	Reading	La Nucia
10:00 BST (UTC+1)	Neufville 45+2'	Report		Stadium: Estadi Olímpic Camilo Cano

12 July 2023	Bristol City	v	Reading	Bristol
12:30 BST (UTC+1)				Stadium: Robins High Performance Centre
Note: Match due to be played behind closed-doors, but cancelled on 11 July.

15 July 2023	Sutton United	2–0	Reading	Sutton
15:00 BST (UTC+1)	Trialist 58'; Angol 59'	Report		Stadium: Gander Green Lane

22 July 2023	Reading	2–4	Southampton	Reading
15:00 BST (UTC+1)	Knibbs 22'; Shodipo 89'	Report	Bednarek 3'; Ward-Prowse 9'; A. Armstrong 50'; Aribo 74'	Stadium: Madejski Stadium

25 July 2023	Reading	0–2	Queens Park Rangers	Wokingham
13:00 BST (UTC+1)			Kelman 23'; Richards 90'	Stadium: Bearwood Park
Note: Match played behind closed-doors. Game composed of three 30 minute periods.

26 July 2023	Thatcham Town	0–1	Reading XI	Thatcham
19:30 BST (UTC+1)				Stadium: Waterside Park

29 July 2023	Reading	0–4	Swansea City	Reading
15:00 BST (UTC+1)		Report	Piroe 24', 49'; Yates 52'; Grimes 55'	Stadium: Madejski Stadium

29 July 2023	Weymouth	1–2	Reading XI	Weymouth
15:00 BST (UTC+1)				Stadium: Bob Lucas Stadium

== Competitions ==
=== Overall record ===
Competition	First match	Last match	Starting round	Final position	Record							
Competition	First match	Last match	Starting round	Final position	Pld	W	D	L	GF	GA	GD	Win %
League One	5 August 2023	27 April 2024	Matchday 1	17th	46	16	11	19	68	70	−2	34.78
FA Cup	4 November 2023	3 December 2023	First round	Second round	2	1	0	1	4	4	+0	50.00
EFL Cup	8 August 2023	29 August 2023	First round	Second round	2	1	1	0	6	2	+4	50.00
EFL Trophy	19 September 2023	9 January 2024	Group stage	Round of 16	5	3	2	0	20	3	+17	60.00
Total					55	21	14	20	98	79	+19	38.18

Last updated: 27 April 2024
Source: Soccerway

=== League One ===
==== League table ====
Pos	Team	Pld	W	D	L	GF	GA	GD	Pts
14	Northampton Town	46	17	9	20	57	66	−9	60
15	Bristol Rovers	46	16	9	21	52	68	−16	57
16	Charlton Athletic	46	11	20	15	64	65	−1	53
17	Reading	46	16	11	19	68	70	−2	53 (Note: On 16 August 2023, Reading were deducted one point for failing to pay players on time and in full on three occasions in the 2022–23 season. Another 3-point deduction was applied on 13 September, for failing to deposit wages on time. Another 2-point deduction was applied on 27 February, due to late HMRC payments.)
18	Cambridge United	46	12	12	22	39	61	−22	48
19	Shrewsbury Town	46	13	9	24	35	67	−32	48
20	Burton Albion	46	12	10	24	39	67	−28	46

Source: EFL Official Website
Rules for classification: 1) Points; 2) Goal difference; 3) Number of goals scored; 4) Head-to-head results; 5) Wins; 6) Away goals; 7) Penalty points (sec 9.5); 8) 12-point sending off offences

==== Results summary ====
Overall								Home						Away					
Pld	W	D	L	GF	GA	GD	Pts	W	D	L	GF	GA	GD	W	D	L	GF	GA	GD
46	16	11	19	68	70	−2	55	12	5	6	39	24	+15	4	6	13	29	46	−17

Last updated: 27 April 2024.
Source: Soccerway

==== Results by round ====
Round	1	2	3	4	5	6	8	9	10	11	12	14	15	16	7^{1}	17	19	20	21	13^{4}	22	23	24	25	26	29	18^{5}	30	31	28^{6}	32	33	34	29^{7}	35	36	37	38	39	41	42	43	40^{9}	44	45	46
Ground	H	A	H	H	A	A	H	A	H	A	A	H	A	H	H	A	A	H	H	H	A	H	A	A	H	H	A	H	A	A	H	A	A	H	H	A	H	A	H	H	A	H	A	A	A	H
Result	L	L	W	W	L	L	W	L	D	L	L	L	L	L	D	L	W	W	L	D	D	W	D	D	W	L	W	D	D	W	W	D	L	W	L	W	L	L	W	W	L	D	W	D	L	W
Position	18	19	16^{2}	13	16	18^{3}	21	22	21	22	22	23	23	24	24	24	24	23	23	23	23	21	21	21	20	21	21	21	21	20	18	16	18	16	16^{8}	16	18	18	18	17	18	17	17	17	17	17

Updated to match(es) played on 27 April 2024. Source: Soccerway
A = Away; H = Home; W = Win; D = Draw; L = Loss; P = Postponed
Notes:
- ^{1} Matchday 7 (vs Bristol Rovers) was postponed due to the international call-ups.
- ^{2} Between matchday 3 and 4, Reading were deducted 1 point.
- ^{3} Between matchday 6 and 8, Reading were deducted 3 points.
- ^{4} Matchday 13 (vs Oxford United) was postponed due to the international call-ups.
- ^{5} Matchday 18 (vs Derby County) was postponed due to the international call-ups.
- ^{6} Matchday 28 (vs Stevenage) was postponed due to Stevenage's participation in the Third Round of the FA Cup.
- ^{7} Matchday 29 (vs Port Vale) was abandoned due to a pitch invasion by Reading fans in the 16th minute.
- ^{8} Between matchday 35 and 36, Reading were deducted 2 points.
- ^{9} Matchday 40 (vs Bristol Rovers) was postponed due to the international call-ups.

==== Matches ====
5 August 2023 1	Reading	0–1	Peterborough United	Reading
15:00 BST (UTC+1)	Azeez (yellow card) 22'; Hutchinson (yellow card) 23'; Yiadom (yellow card) 38'; Savage (yellow card) 52'; Guinness-Walker (yellow card) 65'; Holmes (yellow card) 73'	Report	Kioso (yellow card) 8'; Mason-Clark 43'; Edwards (yellow card) 66'; Kyprianou (yellow card) 86'; Jones (yellow card) 90+9'	Stadium: Madejski Stadium; Attendance: 13,976; Referee: Simon Mather

12 August 2023 2	Port Vale	1–0	Reading	Burslem
15:00 BST (UTC+1)	Garrity 72'	Report	Carroll (penalty missed) 12' (yellow card) 45+6'; Wing (yellow card) 72'	Stadium: Vale Park; Attendance: 8,789; Referee: Peter Wright

15 August 2023 3	Reading	1–0	Cheltenham Town	Reading
20:00 BST (UTC+1)	Ferry 33' (o.g.); Carson (yellow card) 49'; McIntyre (yellow card) 90+6'	Report	Long (yellow card) 38'; Street (yellow card) 90+5'	Stadium: Madejski Stadium; Attendance: 10,787; Referee: Ben Speedie

19 August 2023 4	Reading	2–0	Stevenage	Reading
15:00 BST (UTC+1)	Ehibhatiomhan 45+4', 57'	Report	N.Thompson (yellow card) 5' (yellow-red card) 22'; Reid (yellow card) 10'; MacDonald (yellow card) 26'; Neal (yellow card) 69'	Stadium: Madejski Stadium; Attendance: 11,674; Referee: Anthony Backhouse

26 August 2023 5	Exeter City	2–1	Reading	Exeter
15:00 BST (UTC+1)	Sweeney (yellow card) 17'; Aimson 34'; Jules (yellow card) 44'; Cole 90+3' (yellow card) 90+3'	Report	Azeez (yellow card) 24'; Mbengue (yellow card) 37'; Knibbs 45+3'; Carson (yellow card) 56'; Abbey (yellow card) 89'	Stadium: St James Park; Attendance: 7,956; Referee: Will Finnie

4 September 2023 6	Cambridge United	1–0	Reading	Cambridge
20:00 BST (UTC+1)	Morrison (yellow card) 65'; Okenabirhie 83'	Report	Dean (yellow card) 27'; Hutchinson (yellow card) 68'; Yiadom (yellow card) 70'; Savage (yellow card) 75'	Stadium: Abbey Stadium; Attendance: 6,789; Referee: Darren Drysdale

16 September 2023 8	Reading	2–1	Bolton Wanderers	Reading
15:00 BST (UTC+1)	Ballard (yellow card) 30'; Savage 77' (yellow card) 90+2'; Yiadom (yellow card) 79'; Vickers 86'	Report	Santos (yellow card) 13'; Toal (yellow card) 16' (yellow-red card) 90+4'; Charles 20'; Williams (yellow card) 38'; Jerome (yellow card) 76'; Thomason (yellow card) 76'	Stadium: Madejski Stadium; Attendance: 13,155; Referee: Lee Swabey

23 September 2023 9	Blackpool	4–1	Reading	Blackpool
15:00 BST (UTC+1)	Rhodes 20' (pen.), 31', 51'; Kouassi 27'	Report	Hutchinson (yellow card) 52'; Husband 78' (o.g.)	Stadium: Bloomfield Road; Attendance: 10,104; Referee: Tom Reeves

30 September 2023 10	Reading	0–0	Burton Albion	Reading
15:00 BST (UTC+1)	McIntyre (yellow card) 44'	Report	Baah (yellow card) 45+12'; Hamer (yellow card) 50'; Seddon (yellow card) 66'; Powell (yellow card) 90+2'	Stadium: Madejski Stadium; Attendance: 13,554; Referee: Sam Purkiss

3 October 2023 11	Northampton Town	3–1	Reading	Northampton
19:45 BST (UTC+1)	Hoskins 10'; Appéré 37'; McWilliams (yellow card) 80'; Pinnock 90+6'	Report	Savage (yellow card) 11'; Ehibhatiomhan (yellow card) 15'; Ballard 66'; Mola (yellow card) 78' (yellow-red card) 90+8'; Yiadom (red card) 90+3'	Stadium: Sixfields Stadium; Attendance: 6,550; Referee: Matthew Corlett

7 October 2023 12	Leyton Orient	2–1	Reading	Leyton
15:00 BST (UTC+1)	Brown 26'; Hunt (yellow card) 61'; Sotiriou (yellow card) 69'; Moncur 89'; Brynn (yellow card) 90+2'	Report	Bindon (yellow card) 19' (goal) 35'; Azeez (yellow card) 70'	Stadium: Brisbane Road; Attendance: 8,639; Referee: Neil Hair

21 October 2023 14	Charlton Athletic	4–0	Reading	Charlton
15:00 BST (UTC+1)	Aneke 54'; Campbell 68'; May 74'; Leaburn 90+4'	Report		Stadium: The Valley; Attendance: 15,572; Referee: Scott Oldham

24 October 2023 15	Reading	1–2	Fleetwood Town	Reading
20:00 BST (UTC+1)	Ballard 56'; Carson (yellow card) 90+7'	Report	Lawal 2'; Vela (yellow card) 88' (goal) 90+2'; Stockley (yellow card) 90+8'	Stadium: Madejski Stadium; Attendance: 9,490; Referee: Ben Atkinson

28 October 2023 16	Reading	2–3	Portsmouth	Reading
15:00 BST (UTC+1)	Wing 23' (yellow card) 45+5'; Savage 27'; Guinness-Walker (yellow card) 52'; Dean (yellow card) 82'; Elliott (yellow card) 90'; Mbengue (red card) 90+9'	Report	Anjorin 33'; Bishop 45+9'; Devlin 58'; Robertson (yellow card) 60'; Saydee (yellow card) 89'	Stadium: Madejski Stadium; Attendance: 14,417; Referee: Martin Coy

7 November 2023 7	Reading	1–1	Bristol Rovers	Reading
20:00 GMT (UTC)	Savage (yellow card) 25'; Smith 40'; Hutchinson (yellow card) 49'; Craig (yellow card) 87'	Report	Martin 57'; Finley (yellow card) 82'	Stadium: Madejski Stadium; Attendance: 11,726; Referee: Adam Herczeg
Note: Fixture was originally scheduled for 9 September 2023, but postponed on 23 August 2023 due to international call-ups. The fixture was originally re-arranged for 1 November 2023, before being moved to 7 November 2023.

11 November 2023 17	Shrewsbury Town	3–2	Reading	Shrewsbury
15:00 GMT (UTC)	Maroši (yellow card) 15'; Bayliss 33'; Dunkley 90+2'; Sraha 90+6' (yellow card) 90+7'	Report	Smith 12'; Ballard 15'; Button (yellow card) 69'; Hutchinson (yellow card) 78'	Stadium: New Meadow; Attendance: 6,893; Referee: Marc Edwards

25 November 2023 19	Wycombe Wanderers	1–2	Reading	High Wycombe
15:00 GMT (UTC)	Boyes (yellow card) 14'; Phillips 32'; Wheeler (yellow card) 90+4'	Report	Smith 30'; Wing 41'	Stadium: Adams Park; Attendance: 7,073; Referee: Craig Hicks

28 November 2023 20	Reading	5–1	Carlisle United	Reading
20:00 GMT (UTC)	Lavelle 26' (o.g.); Knibbs 32', 39'; Dorsett (yellow card) 54'; Wing 78'; Azeez 83'	Report	Plange 29'; Armer (yellow card) 33'	Stadium: Madejski Stadium; Attendance: 8,455; Referee: Charles Breakspear

9 December 2023 21	Reading	1–3	Barnsley	Reading
15:00 GMT (UTC)	Knibbs 4'; Craig (yellow card) 11'; Smith (yellow card) 39'	Report	Cadden (yellow card) 14'; Kane 39' (pen.) (yellow card) 90+4'; Cole (yellow card) 61' (goal) 80'; Styles (yellow card) 63'; Phillips (yellow card) 67'; Watters 87'	Stadium: Madejski Stadium; Attendance: 12,519; Referee: Ollie Yates

12 December 2023 13	Reading	1–1	Oxford United	Reading
20:00 GMT (UTC)	Craig (yellow card) 19'; Smith 43'; Holmes (yellow card) 51'	Report	Thorniley (yellow card) 37'; Brown 39'	Stadium: Madejski Stadium; Attendance: 14,397; Referee: Carl Brook
Note: Match originally scheduled for 14 October, but post postponed on 30 September due to international call-ups.

16 December 2023 22	Lincoln City	1–1	Reading	Lincoln
15:00 GMT (UTC)	Abbey 3' (o.g.); Duffy (yellow card) 38'; Jensen (yellow card) 41'; Hamilton (yellow card) 90+3'	Report	Abbey (yellow card) 22'; Knibbs 56' (yellow card) 75'; Yiadom (yellow card) 75'	Stadium: Sincil Bank; Attendance: 8,109; Referee: Bobby Madley

23 December 2023 23	Reading	2–0	Wigan Athletic	Reading
15:00 GMT (UTC)	Azeez 34'; Smith 50'; Abbey (yellow card) 56'	Report	Wyke (yellow card) 42'; Clare (yellow card) 47'; McManaman (yellow card) 57'; Humphrys (yellow card) 75'; Lang (yellow card) 90+3'	Stadium: Madejski Stadium; Attendance: 11,772; Referee: Martin Woods

26 December 2023 24	Peterborough United	2–2	Reading	Peterborough
15:00 GMT (UTC)	Knight 39'; Mason-Clark 69' (yellow card) 76'	Report	Mbengue (yellow card) 56'; Sam Smith 63' (yellow card) 90'; Azeez 85'; Knibbs (yellow card) 90+2'	Stadium: London Road; Attendance: 10,444; Referee: David Rock

29 December 2023 25	Cheltenham Town	2–2	Reading	Cheltenham
19:45 GMT (UTC)	Sercombe 30'; Button 37' (o.g.); Pett (yellow card) 67'; Smith (yellow card) 79'	Report	Mbengue (yellow card) 27'; Smith (yellow card) 32'; Dorsett (yellow card) 36' (goal) 45'; Mukairu 45+2'; Knibbs (yellow card) 89'	Stadium: Whaddon Road; Attendance: 5,941; Referee: Scott Tallis

1 January 2024 26	Reading	3–2	Exeter City	Reading
15:00 GMT (UTC)	Knibbs 9'; Craig (yellow card) 42'; Hartridge 45+2' (o.g.); Azeez 77'; Dorsett (yellow card) 81'	Report	Jules 18'; Rankine 68'	Stadium: Madejski Stadium; Attendance: 13,560; Referee: Anthony Backhouse

20 January 2024 29	Wigan Athletic	1–0	Reading	Wigan
15:00 GMT (UTC)	Aasgaard 32'; Humphrys (yellow card) 69'; Sessegnon (yellow card) 90+2'	Report	Savage (yellow card) 88'	Stadium: DW Stadium; Attendance: 9,103; Referee: Tom Reeves

23 January 2024 18	Reading	1–0	Derby County	Reading
20:00 GMT (UTC)	Mukairu 54'; Mbengue (yellow card) 73'	Report		Stadium: Madejski Stadium; Attendance: 9,914; Referee: Darren Drysdale
Note: Match originally scheduled for 18 November, but post postponed on 2 November due to international call-ups.

27 January 2024 30	Reading	1–1	Leyton Orient	Reading
15:00 GMT (UTC)	Knibbs 23'; Bindon (yellow card) 53'; Smith (yellow card) 53'	Report	Agyei 19' (pen.); Galbraith (yellow card) 77'	Stadium: Madejski Stadium; Attendance: 14,972; Referee: Graham Scott

3 February 2024 31	Oxford United	1–1	Reading	Oxford
12:30 GMT (UTC)	Harris 32'; Goodrham (yellow card) 65'	Report	Craig (yellow card) 24'; Yiadom (yellow card) 63'; Azeez (yellow card) 71'; Brown 76' (o.g.)	Stadium: Kassam Stadium; Attendance: 10,897; Referee: Scott Oldham

6 February 2024 28	Stevenage	0–1	Reading	Stevenage
19:45 GMT (UTC)		Report	Savage (yellow card) 24'; Mola (yellow card) 39'; Oliver 45' (o.g.); Knibbs (yellow card) 89'; Ehibhatiomhan (yellow card) 90+4'	Stadium: Broadhall Way; Attendance: 3,947; Referee: Paul Howard
Note: Match originally scheduled for 6 January, but post postponed on 14 December due to Stevenage playing in the FA Cup Third Round the same day.

10 February 2024 32	Reading	2–0	Charlton Athletic	Reading
15:00 GMT (UTC)	Azeez 66', 76'; Savage (yellow card) 86'	Report	Edun (yellow card) 64'	Stadium: Madejski Stadium; Attendance: 14,554; Referee: Craig Hicks

13 February 2024 33	Fleetwood Town	1–1	Reading	Fleetwood
19:45 GMT (UTC)	Wiredu 90+5'	Report	Bindon (yellow card) 21'; Wing 74'; Mola (yellow card) 80'; Button (yellow card) 88'	Stadium: Highbury Stadium; Attendance: 3,082; Referee: Simon Mather

17 February 2024 34	Portsmouth	4–1	Reading	Portsmouth
15:00 GMT (UTC)	Shaughnessy (yellow card) 30'; Lane 36'; Pack (yellow card) 45+1', (goal) 49'; Lang 59'; Rafferty (yellow card) 67'; Bishop 84'; Martin (yellow card) 90+3'	Report	Wing (yellow card) 40'; Mola (yellow card) 45'; Azeez (yellow card) 45+3'; Savage 89'	Stadium: Fratton Park; Attendance: 20,113; Referee: Josh Smith

20 February 2024 29	Reading	2–0	Port Vale	Reading
20:00 GMT (UTC)	Wing 76'; Knibbs 83'	Report		Stadium: Madejski Stadium; Attendance: 10,004; Referee: Ross Joyce
Note: Match originally scheduled for 13 January, but abandoned in the 16th minute due to a pitch invasion by the fans in protest against owner Dai Yongge.

24 February 2024 35	Reading	2–3	Shrewsbury Town	Reading
15:00 GMT (UTC)	Smith 9' (yellow card) 90'; Yiadom (yellow card) 19'; Ehibhatiomhan 36'; Wing (yellow card) 79'; Mola (yellow card) 90+1'	Report	Shipley 3' (yellow card) 74'; Bayliss 5'; Benning (yellow card) 32'; Bloxham 45+5'; Hinchy (yellow card) 49'; Bowman (yellow card) 59'; Kenneh (yellow card) 66'	Stadium: Madejski Stadium; Attendance: 12,904; Referee: Ollie Yates

2 March 2024 36	Carlisle United	1–3	Reading	Carlisle
15:00 GMT (UTC)	Mellish 71'	Report	Smith 17'; Knibbs 36', 57'	Stadium: Brunton Park; Attendance: 7,891; Referee: Martin Coy

9 March 2024 37	Reading	1–2	Wycombe Wanderers	Reading
15:00 GMT (UTC)	Yiadom (yellow card) 68'; Smith 74'; Azeez (yellow card) 90'	Report	Lonwijk 16'; Butcher (yellow card) 46'; Lubala 88' (pen.) (yellow card) 88'	Stadium: Madejski Stadium; Attendance: 15,038; Referee: Carl Brook

12 March 2024 38	Derby County	2–1	Reading	Derby
19:45 GMT (UTC)	Cashin (yellow card) 47'; Gayle 53'; Adams (yellow card) 57'; Hourihane 70' (pen.); Sibley (yellow card) 79'	Report	Bindon (yellow card) 10'; Yiadom (yellow card) 32' (yellow-red card) 59'; Mola (yellow card) 49'; Smith 56'; Pereira (yellow card) 69'; Wareham (yellow card) 90+4'	Stadium: Pride Park Stadium; Attendance: 24,821; Referee: Charles Breakspear

16 March 2024 39	Reading	4–0	Cambridge United	Reading
15:00 GMT (UTC)	Smith 11'; Azeez 45+2'; Wing 62'; Ehibhatiomhan 85'	Report	Bennett (yellow card) 84'	Stadium: Madejski Stadium; Attendance: 15,644; Referee: Ben Speedie

29 March 2024 41	Reading	1–0	Northampton Town	Reading
15:00 BST (UTC+1)	Elliott (yellow card) 22'; Ehibhatiomhan 65'	Report	Monthé (yellow card) 4'	Stadium: Madejski Stadium; Attendance: 15,451; Referee: Thomas Parsons

1 April 2024 42	Bolton Wanderers	5–2	Reading	Horwich
15:00 BST (UTC+1)	Collins 11', 45+3' (pen.), 77'; Ogbeta (yellow card) 16'; Böðvarsson 49', 90+5'; Sheehan (yellow card) 53'	Report	Wing 40'; Mukairu 90+3'	Stadium: Toughsheet Community Stadium; Attendance: 25,266; Referee: Ben Toner

6 April 2024 43	Reading	1–1	Lincoln City	Reading
15:00 BST (UTC+1)	Wing (yellow card) 67'; Bindon 83'; Elliott (yellow card) 90+4'	Report	Erhahon (yellow card) 45+2'; Draper 72'	Stadium: Madejski Stadium; Attendance: 15,209; Referee: Alex Chilowicz

9 April 2024 40	Bristol Rovers	0–2	Reading	Bristol
19:45 BST (UTC+1)	Hunt (yellow card) 90'; Conteh (yellow card) 90+2'	Report	Smith 8'; Wing 45'	Stadium: Memorial Stadium; Attendance: 7,951; Referee: Will Finnie
Note: Match originally scheduled for 23 March, but post postponed on 5 March due to international call-ups.

13 April 2024 44	Barnsley	2–2	Reading	Barnsley
15:00 BST (UTC+1)	Phillips 29' (yellow card) 64'; Jaló 83'	Report	Smith 21'; Wing 81'	Stadium: Oakwell; Attendance: 12,405; Referee: Seb Stockbridge

20 April 2024 45	Burton Albion	3–2	Reading	Burton upon Trent
15:00 BST (UTC+1)	Bennett 5' (yellow card) 75'; Carayol 11'; Kamwa 42'; Ola-Adebomi (yellow card) 90+7'	Report	Wing 34'; Smith 59' (pen.)	Stadium: Pirelli Stadium; Attendance: 4,487; Referee: Scott Oldham

27 April 2024 46	Reading	3–2	Blackpool	Reading
12:30 BST (UTC+1)	Smith 45+2'; Knibbs 68'; Azeez 71'; Wareham (yellow card) 90+6'	Report	Dembélé 4'; Lawrence-Gabriel 90+2'	Stadium: Madejski Stadium; Attendance: 18,480; Referee: Ben Speedie

=== FA Cup ===
Reading were drawn at home to Milton Keynes Dons in the first round.

4 November 2023 First Round	Reading	3–2	Milton Keynes Dons	Reading
15:00 GMT (UTC)	Ehibhatiomhan 3'; Elliott (yellow card) 28'; Hutchinson (yellow card) 49'; Knibbs 64' (yellow card) 76'; Wing 68'	Report	Gilbey 39'; Dean 90+2' (yellow card) 90+4'	Stadium: Madejski Stadium; Attendance: 4,325; Referee: Thomas Kirk

3 December 2023 Second Round	Eastleigh	2–1	Reading	Eastleigh
13:30 GMT (UTC)	Langston (yellow card) 9'; McCallum 22', 90+4' (yellow card) 35'; Taylor (yellow card) 23'; Maguire (yellow card) 88'	Report	Savage (yellow card) 29'; Mola (yellow card) 54'; Mbengue (yellow card) 81'; Azeez 86'; Dean (yellow card) 89'	Stadium: Ten Acres; Attendance: 5,002; Referee: Lewis Smith

=== EFL Cup ===
Reading were drawn away to Millwall in the first round and at home to Ipswich Town in the second round.

8 August 2023 First Round	Millwall	0–4	Reading	Bermondsey
19:45 BST (UTC+1)	Leonard (yellow card) 25'; Saville (yellow card) 62'; Evans (yellow card) 85'; Bryan (yellow card) 86'	Report	Ehibhatiomhan 1', 51'; Knibbs (yellow card) 10'; Camara (yellow card) 19' (goal) 88'; Rushesha (yellow card) 39'; Carson (yellow card) 53'; Savage 67'	Stadium: The Den; Attendance: 4,738; Referee: Leigh Doughty

29 August 2023 Second round	Reading	2–2 (1–3 p)	Ipswich Town	Reading
20:00 BST (UTC+1)	Williams 2' (o.g.); Craig (yellow card) 76'; Ehibhatiomhan 87'; McIntyre (yellow card) 90+6'	Report	Evans (yellow card) 39'; Humphreys (yellow card) 41' (goal) 45+5'; Ladapo 59'; Edmundson (yellow card) 87'	Stadium: Madejski Stadium; Attendance: 7,867; Referee: Lewis Smith
	Penalties
	Knibbs (penalty scored); Savage (penalty missed); Vickers (penalty missed); Elliott (penalty missed)		(penalty scored) Chaplin; (penalty scored) Evans; (penalty missed) Aluko; (penalty scored) Taylor

=== EFL Trophy ===
In the group stage, Reading were drawn into Southern Group G alongside Exeter City, Swindon Town and Arsenal U21. After topping their group, they were drawn at home to Charlton Athletic in the Round of 32. After defeating Charlton on penalties, Reading were drawn away to Brighton & Hove Albion U21 in the Last 16.

==== Group stage ====
Pos	Div	Team	Pld	W	PW	PL	L	GF	GA	GD	Pts	Qualification
1	L1	Reading	3	3	0	0	0	19	2	+17	9	Advance to Round 2
2	ACA	Arsenal U21	3	1	1	0	1	9	7	+2	5	Advance to Round 2
3	L1	Exeter City	3	1	0	0	2	1	14	−13	3	
4	L2	Swindon Town	3	0	0	1	2	2	8	−6	1	

Updated to match(es) played on 14 November 2023. Source: EFL.com

19 September 2023 1	Exeter City	0–9	Reading	Exeter
19:00 BST (UTC+1)	Daniels (yellow card) 49'	Report	McIntyre 3' (yellow card) 47'; Jules 32' (o.g.); Mukairu 56', 60'; Ballard 67', 90+6'; Elliott 79'; Harris 85'; Vickers 90'	Stadium: St James Park; Attendance: 1,871; Referee: Carl Brook
Note: Match originally scheduled for 5 September, but moved to 19 September after Reading's away trip to Cambridge United scheduled for 2 September was moved to 4 September after being picked to be shown live on Sky Sports.

10 October 2023 2	Reading	5–0	Swindon Town	Reading
19:00 BST (UTC+1)	Knibbs 19', 45+2', 49' (pen.) (yellow card) 39'; Craig (yellow card) 23'; Holmes (yellow card) 27'; Mukairu 90+4'; Dean 90+5'	Report	Shade (yellow card) 31'; Hutt (yellow card) 90+3'	Stadium: Madejski Stadium; Attendance: 6,121; Referee: A.Ajibola

14 November 2023 3	Reading	5–2	Arsenal U21	Reading
19:00 GMT (UTC)	Ehibhatiomhan 13', 35' (penalty missed) 60'; Vickers 24'; Guinness-Walker (yellow card) 45+3'; Holmes (yellow card) 54'; Craig (yellow card) 67'; Knibbs 68'; Smith 90+5'	Report	Ibrahim (yellow card) 11'; Walters (yellow card) 19'; Vieira 33' (pen.) (penalty missed) 82'; Edwards 53'; Heaven (red card) 89'	Stadium: Madejski Stadium; Attendance: 3,015

==== Knockout stages ====
6 December 2023 Round of 32	Reading	1–1 (4–2 p)	Charlton Athletic	Reading
19:00 GMT (UTC)	Carson (yellow card) 46'; Savage 82'	Report	May 42'	Stadium: Madejski Stadium; Attendance: 1,809; Referee: Peter Wright
	Penalties
	Knibbs (penalty scored); Carson (penalty scored); Azeez (penalty scored); Vickers (penalty scored)		(penalty missed) May; (penalty scored) Fraser; (penalty scored) Hector; (penalty missed) Watson

9 January 2024 Round of 16	Brighton & Hove Albion U21	0–0 (3–2 p)	Reading	Falmer
19:00 GMT (UTC)	McConville (yellow card) 52'	Report	Abbey (yellow card) 45'; Mbengue (yellow card) 77'	Stadium: Falmer Stadium; Attendance: 990; Referee: Will Finnie
	Penalties
	O'Mahony (penalty scored); Hinchy (penalty scored); Slater (penalty missed); Knight (penalty missed); Howell (penalty scored)		Vickers (penalty missed); Bindon (penalty scored); Azeez (penalty missed); Rushesha (penalty missed); Wareham (penalty scored)

== Squad statistics ==
As of match played 27 April 2024

=== Appearances and goals ===
No.	Pos	Nat	Player	Total		League One		FA Cup		League Cup		League Trophy	
No.	Pos	Nat	Player	Apps	Goals	Apps	Goals	Apps	Goals	Apps	Goals	Apps	Goals
1	GK	(England) ENG	David Button	38	0	36+1	0	0	0	0	0	1	0
2	DF	(England) ENG	Clinton Mola	35	0	19+11	0	1	0	0	0	2+2	0
3	DF	(England) ENG	Tom Holmes	16	0	10+3	0	1	0	0	0	2	0
4	MF	(Cameroon) CMR	Ben Elliott	42	1	11+26	0	2	0	1	0	2	1
6	DF	(England) ENG	Harlee Dean	16	1	8+3	0	0+1	0	0+1	0	2+1	1
7	FW	(England) ENG	Harvey Knibbs	53	16	44+1	11	1+1	1	1+1	0	1+3	4
8	MF	(Wales) WAL	Charlie Savage	45	5	24+16	3	1	0	0+2	1	1+1	1
9	FW	(England) ENG	Dom Ballard	12	5	6+4	3	0+1	0	0	0	0+1	2
10	FW	(England) ENG	Sam Smith	37	16	32+2	15	0+1	0	0	0	1+1	1
11	FW	(England) ENG	Femi Azeez	52	9	43+3	8	1+1	1	0+1	0	1+2	0
12	FW	(Nigeria) NGR	Paul Mukairu	39	6	15+16	3	1+1	0	0+1	0	5	3
14	DF	(England) ENG	Zane Monlouis	1	0	0+1	0	0	0	0	0	0	0
15	FW	(Nigeria) NGR	Kelvin Ehibhatiomhan	47	11	24+16	5	2	1	1+1	3	2+1	2
17	DF	(Ghana) GHA	Andy Yiadom	34	0	26+6	0	0	0	0+1	0	1	0
19	FW	(England) ENG	Jayden Wareham	11	0	0+7	0	0	0	0	0	3+1	0
20	DF	(Montserrat) MSR	Jeriel Dorsett	27	1	21+2	1	0+1	0	0+1	0	1+1	0
22	GK	(Portugal) POR	Joel Pereira	14	0	9	0	2	0	0	0	3	0
23	DF	(England) ENG	Sam Hutchinson	14	0	9+3	0	1	0	0	0	1	0
24	DF	(New Zealand) NZL	Tyler Bindon	44	2	37+3	2	1	0	1	0	2	0
27	DF	(Senegal) SEN	Amadou Mbengue	44	1	25+12	1	1	0	2	0	4	0
28	MF	(Guinea-Bissau) GBS	Mamadi Camará	7	1	3+3	0	0	0	1	1	0	0
29	MF	(England) ENG	Lewis Wing	49	11	39+3	10	1+1	1	1	0	2+2	0
30	DF	(Ghana) GHA	Kelvin Abrefa	13	0	2+9	0	0	0	1	0	0+1	0
31	GK	(Jamaica) JAM	Coniah Boyce-Clarke	3	0	0	0	0	0	2	0	1	0
35	MF	(Belgium) BEL	Jack Senga	1	0	0	0	0	0	1	0	0	0
36	MF	(Scotland) SCO	Michael Craig	36	0	17+11	0	1+1	0	1+1	0	4	0
38	DF	(England) ENG	Michael Stickland	1	0	0	0	0	0	0	0	0+1	0
40	MF	(Wales) WAL	Tivonge Rushesha	11	0	0+4	0	1+1	0	2	0	2+1	0
47	DF	(England) ENG	Matthew Carson	17	0	7+3	0	2	0	2	0	2+1	0
48	FW	(Malta) MLT	Basil Tuma	4	0	0+2	0	0	0	1+1	0	0	0
58	MF	(England) ENG	Charlie Wellens	1	0	0	0	0	0	0	0	0+1	0
Players away on loan:
18	DF	(England) ENG	Nesta Guinness-Walker	11	0	5+3	0	0	0	0+1	0	2	0
21	GK	(Australia) AUS	Dean Bouzanis	1	0	1	0	0	0	0	0	0	0
61	GK	(England) ENG	Tom Norcott	1	0	0	0	0	0	0	0	0+1	0
Players who appeared for Reading but left during the season:
5	DF	(Scotland) SCO	Tom McIntyre	12	1	3+7	0	0	0	1	0	1	1
9	FW	(England) ENG	Andy Carroll	2	0	2	0	0	0	0	0	0	0
32	DF	(England) ENG	Nelson Abbey	26	0	21+1	0	1	0	1	0	2	0
42	FW	(England) ENG	Caylan Vickers	22	3	7+7	1	1	0	2	0	4+1	2
55	FW	(England) ENG	Taylan Harris	1	1	0	0	0	0	0	0	0+1	1

=== Goal scorers ===
Place	Position	Nation	Number	Name	League One	FA Cup	League Cup	League Trophy	Total
1	FW	(England)	10	Sam Smith	15	0	0	1	16
1	FW	(England)	7	Harvey Knibbs	11	1	0	4	16
3	MF	(England)	29	Lewis Wing	10	1	0	0	11
3	FW	(Nigeria)	15	Kelvin Ehibhatiomhan	5	1	3	2	11
5	FW	(England)	11	Femi Azeez	8	1	0	0	9
6				Own goal	6	0	1	1	8
7	FW	(Nigeria)	12	Paul Mukairu	3	0	0	3	6
8	MF	(Wales)	8	Charlie Savage	3	0	1	1	5
8	FW	(England)	9	Dom Ballard	3	0	0	2	5
10	FW	(England)	42	Caylan Vickers	1	0	0	2	3
11	DF	(New Zealand)	24	Tyler Bindon	2	0	0	0	2
12	DF	(Montserrat)	20	Jeriel Dorsett	1	0	0	0	1
12	MF	(Guinea-Bissau)	28	Mamadi Camará	0	0	1	0	1
12	DF	(Scotland)	5	Tom McIntyre	0	0	0	1	1
12	MF	(Cameroon)	4	Ben Elliott	0	0	0	1	1
12	FW	(England)	55	Taylan Harris	0	0	0	1	1
12	DF	(England)	6	Harlee Dean	0	0	0	1	1
Total					68	4	6	20	98

=== Clean sheets ===
Place	Position	Nation	Number	Name	League One	FA Cup	League Cup	League Trophy	Total
1	GK	(England)	1	David Button	7	0	0	1	8
2	GK	(Portugal)	22	Joel Pereira	3	0	0	1	4
3	GK	(Jamaica)	31	Coniah Boyce-Clarke	0	0	1	1	2
4	GK	(England)	61	Tom Norcott	0	0	0	1	1
Total					10	0	1	3	14

David Button & Tom Norcott both played in Reading's 5-0 victory over Swindon Town on 10 October 2023

=== Disciplinary record ===
Number	Nation	Position	Name	League One		FA Cup		League Cup		League Trophy		Total	
Number	Nation	Position	Name	Yellow card	Red card	Yellow card	Red card	Yellow card	Red card	Yellow card	Red card	Yellow card	Red card
1	(England)	GK	David Button	2	0	0	0	0	0	0	0	2	0
2	(England)	DF	Clinton Mola	7	1	1	0	0	0	0	0	8	1
3	(England)	DF	Tom Holmes	2	0	0	0	0	0	2	0	4	0
4	(Cameroon)	MF	Ben Elliott	3	0	1	0	0	0	0	0	4	0
6	(England)	DF	Harlee Dean	2	0	1	0	0	0	0	0	3	0
7	(England)	FW	Harvey Knibbs	4	0	1	0	1	0	1	0	7	0
8	(Wales)	MF	Charlie Savage	8	0	1	0	0	0	0	0	9	0
9	(England)	FW	Dom Ballard	1	0	0	0	0	0	0	0	1	0
10	(England)	FW	Sam Smith	5	0	0	0	0	0	0	0	5	0
11	(England)	FW	Femi Azeez	6	0	0	0	0	0	0	0	6	0
15	(Nigeria)	FW	Kelvin Ehibhatiomhan	2	0	0	0	0	0	0	0	2	0
17	(Ghana)	DF	Andy Yiadom	9	2	0	0	0	0	0	0	9	2
19	(England)	FW	Jayden Wareham	4	0	0	0	0	0	0	0	4	0
20	(Montserrat)	DF	Jeriel Dorsett	3	0	0	0	0	0	0	0	3	0
22	(Portugal)	GK	Joel Pereira	3	0	0	0	0	0	0	0	3	0
23	(England)	DF	Sam Hutchinson	5	0	1	0	0	0	0	0	6	0
24	(New Zealand)	DF	Tyler Bindon	4	0	0	0	0	0	0	0	4	0
27	(Senegal)	DF	Amadou Mbengue	4	1	1	0	0	0	1	0	6	1
28	(Guinea-Bissau)	MF	Mamadi Camará	0	0	0	0	1	0	0	0	1	0
29	(England)	MF	Lewis Wing	5	0	0	0	0	0	0	0	5	0
36	(Scotland)	MF	Michael Craig	5	0	0	0	1	0	2	0	8	0
40	(Zimbabwe)	MF	Tivonge Rushesha	0	0	0	0	1	0	0	0	1	0
47	(England)	DF	Matthew Carson	3	0	0	0	1	0	1	0	5	0
Players away on loan:
18	(England)	DF	Nesta Guinness-Walker	2	0	0	0	0	0	1	0	3	0
Players who left Reading during the season:
5	(Scotland)	DF	Tom McIntyre	2	0	0	0	1	0	1	0	4	0
9	(England)	FW	Andy Carroll	1	0	0	0	0	0	0	0	1	0
32	(England)	DF	Nelson Abbey	3	0	0	0	0	0	1	0	4	0
Total				91	4	8	0	6	0	10	0	115	4
