= Tom McIntyre =

Scottish footballer (born 1998)

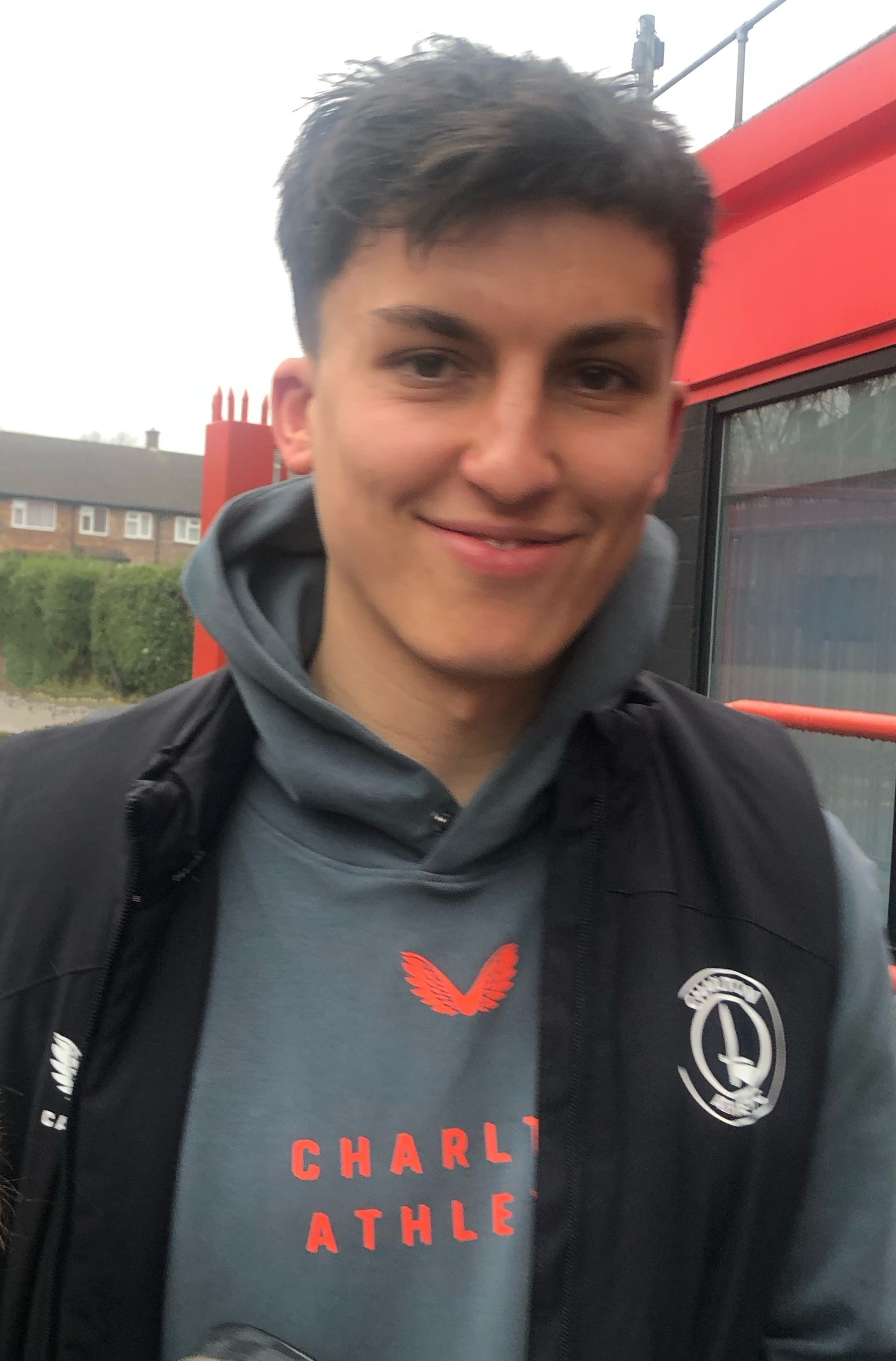
- Tom McIntyre in 2025

Personal information
- Full name: Thomas Peter McIntyre
- Date of birth: 6 November 1998 (age 28)
- Place of birth: Reading, England
- Height: 1.85 m (6 ft 1 in)
- Position: Defender

Team information
- Current team: Forest Green Rovers
- Number: 24

Youth career
- 2008–2016: Reading

Senior career*
Years	Team	Apps	(Gls)
2016–2024	Reading	105	(6)
2024–2026	Portsmouth	13	(0)
2025	→ Charlton Athletic (loan)	10	(0)
2025–2026	→ Bradford City (loan)	7	(0)
2026	Aberdeen	3	(0)
2026–	Forest Green Rovers	3	(0)

International career^{‡}
2014–2015	Scotland U17	8	(0)
2018	Scotland U20	1	(0)
2018–2020	Scotland U21	3	(0)
- * Club domestic league appearances and goals as of 3 November 2026 ‡ National team caps and goals as of 17:10, 22 February 2025 (UTC)

Thomas Peter McIntyre (born 6 November 1998) is a Scottish professional footballer who plays as a defender for National League club Forest Green Rovers.

== Early life ==
McIntyre was born in Reading. He attended Aldryngton Primary School, Maiden Erlegh School, and Forest School. In 2010, McIntyre was part of Aldryngton's under 11 football side who reached the final of the Football League Community Cup, where they represented Reading FC against Leicester.

== Career ==
=== Reading ===
In July 2016, McIntyre signed his first professional deal with Reading, signing a new deal until the summer of 2020 on 3 January 2018. McIntyre became the 48th graduate from Reading Academy when he made his debut in a 1–1 draw against Rotherham United on 15 December 2018, earning man of the match. After the game it was revealed he had played with a fractured forehead and required surgery for metal plates to be fitted. He was consequently ruled out of playing any further games for a few months.

On 26 February 2019, McIntyre signed a new contract with Reading until the summer of 2021.

McIntyre scored his first goal for Reading in a 2–1 win over Luton Town on 26 December 2020.

With his contract due to expire on 30 June 2021, McIntyre signed a new three-year contract with Reading on 29 June 2021, keeping him at the club until the summer of 2024.

=== Portsmouth ===
On 30 January 2024, McIntyre left Reading to sign a two-and-a-half-year contract, with a club option for an additional 12 months, with Portsmouth for an undisclosed fee.

McIntyre made his Portsmouth debut four days after signing for the club, in the 4-1 home win against Northampton Town. McIntyre was shown a straight red card by referee Sam Purkiss in the 54th minute for a 50/50 challenge with Northampton's Mitch Pinnock, however this card (and the subsequent three match ban) was rescinded on appeal. McIntyre received a fractured ankle due to the weight of the challenge and missed the rest of Portsmouth's promotion-winning campaign.

On 2 February 2026, Portsmouth announced that they had mutual agreed with McIntyre to end their contract, with McIntyre having played 14 times for the club.

==== Loans to Charlton Athletic and Bradford City ====
On 3 February 2025, McIntyre joined EFL League One club Charlton Athletic on loan for the rest of the 2024–25 season.

On 1 September 2025, McIntyre left Portsmouth on loan again to League One, this time to Bradford City on a season-long loan. On 14 January 2026, he returned to Portsmouth after Bradford City exercised their option to terminate his loan.

=== Aberdeen ===
On 3 February 2026, Aberdeen announced the signing of McIntyre on a short-term contract until the end of the season.

=== Forest Green Rovers ===
After returning to former club Reading in September 2026 to train, National League club Forest Green Rovers announced the signing of McIntyre on a short-term deal until January 2027 on 9 October 2026.

== International ==
McIntyre has represented Scotland at U17 and U20 before making his U21 debut against Netherlands on 11 September 2018.

== Personal life ==
McIntyre is a keen gamer and until 2021 operated a Twitch channel where he streamed himself playing FIFA and Call of Duty. He currently has 160 victories on Warzone.

== Career statistics ==
=== Club ===
As of match played 7 November 2026

Appearances and goals by club, season and competition
Club	Season	League			National Cup (Note: Includes FA Cup and Scottish Cup)		League Cup (Note: Includes EFL Cup and Scottish League Cup)		Other		Total	
Club	Season	Division	Apps	Goals	Apps	Goals	Apps	Goals	Apps	Goals	Apps	Goals
Reading U23	2016–17	—			—		—		3 (Note: Appearances in EFL Trophy)	0	3	0
Reading	2018–19	Championship	2	0	0	0	0	0	—		2	0
Reading	2019–20	Championship	10	0	2	0	2	0	—		14	0
Reading	2020–21	Championship	26	2	1	0	1	0	—		28	2
Reading	2021–22	Championship	19	2	0	0	1	0	—		20	2
Reading	2022–23	Championship	38	2	2	0	1	0	—		41	2
Reading	2023–24	League One	10	0	0	0	1	0	1	1	12	1
Reading	Total		105	6	5	0	6	0	4	1	120	7
Portsmouth	2023–24	League One	1	0	0	0	0	0	0	0	1	0
Portsmouth	2024–25	Championship	12	0	1	0	0	0	—		13	0
Portsmouth	2025–26	Championship	0	0	0	0	0	0	—		0	0
Portsmouth	Total		13	0	1	0	0	0	0	0	14	0
Charlton Athletic (loan)	2024–25	League One	10	0	—		—		—		10	0
Bradford City (loan)	2025–26	League One	7	0	1	0	1	0	2	0	11	0
Aberdeen	2025–26	Scottish Premiership	3	0	1	0	0	0	—		4	0
Forest Green Rovers	2026–27	National League	3	0	3	0	—		0	0	6	0
Career total			139	6	11	0	7	0	6	1	163	7
