= Tivonge Rushesha =

Zimbabwean footballer (born 2002)

Personal information
- Full name: Tivonge Sacha Rushesha
- Date of birth: 24 July 2002 (age 24)
- Place of birth: Zimbabwe
- Height: 1.74 m (5 ft 9 in)
- Position: Midfielder

Team information
- Current team: Radnik Bijeljina
- Number: 4

Youth career
- –2019: Swansea City

Senior career*
Years	Team	Apps	(Gls)
2019–2023	Swansea City	0	(0)
2023–2026	Reading	22	(0)
2026–	Radnik Bijeljina	2	(0)

International career
2018	Wales U17	2	(0)
- * Club domestic league appearances and goals as of 11 September 2026

Tivonge Sacha Rushesha (born 24 July 2002) is a Zimbabwean professional footballer who plays as a midfielder for Bosnian Premier League club Radnik Bijeljina.

== Club career ==
Rushesha made his Swansea City debut on 28 August 2019 as a second-half substitute in a 6–0 EFL Cup win against Cambridge United.

Rushesha was released by Swansea on 30 June 2023. However, on 4 August 2023, Rushesha signed a one-year contract with League One club Reading. On 4 July 2024, Rushesha signed a new one-year contract with Reading, signing another one-year contract the following summer, on 1 July 2025.

On 5 May 2026, Reading announced that Rushesha would leave the club once his contract expires on 30 June 2026.

On 10 July 2026, Premier League of Bosnia and Herzegovina club Radnik Bijeljina announced the signing of Rushesha.

== International career ==
Rushesha was born in Zimbabwe but moved to the United Kingdom with his family in 2003. He has represented Wales at the under-17 level, playing against Kazakhstan and Portugal in the 2019 UEFA European Under-17 Championship qualifiers in October 2018.

On 13 November 2023, Rushesha was named in the final squad for Zimbabwe's first two 2026 FIFA World Cup qualifiers against Rwanda and Nigeria but didn't play in either game as he was still awaiting his Zimbabwean passport.

== Career statistics ==
=== Club ===
As of match played 11 September 2026

Appearances and goals by club, season and competition
Club	Season	League			FA Cup		EFL Cup		Other		Total	
Club	Season	Division	Apps	Goals	Apps	Goals	Apps	Goals	Apps	Goals	Apps	Goals
Swansea City	2019–20	Championship	0	0	0	0	1	0	–		1	0
Swansea City	2020–21	Championship	0	0	0	0	0	0	–		0	0
Swansea City	2021–22	Championship	0	0	0	0	0	0	–		0	0
Swansea City	2022–23	Championship	0	0	0	0	0	0	–		0	0
Swansea City	Total		0	0	0	0	1	0	–		1	0
Reading	2023–24	League One	4	0	2	0	2	0	3 (Note: Appearances in EFL Trophy)	0	11	0
Reading	2024–25	League One	18	0	2	0	0	0	2	0	22	0
Reading	2025–26	League One	0	0	0	0	3	0	2	0	5	0
Reading	Total		22	0	4	0	5	0	7	0	38	0
Radnik Bijeljina	2026–27	Bosnian Premier League	2	0	0	0	–		–		2	0
Career total			24	0	4	0	6	0	7	0	41	0
