= Dai Yongge =

Chinese businessman and investor

- 戴永革
- Born: Harbin, Heilongjiang, China
- Occupations: Entrepreneur, investor

Dai Yongge (Chinese: 戴永革; pinyin: Dài Yǒnggé) is a Chinese businessman and entrepreneur. He is the former owner of English football club Reading and Chinese football club Beijing Renhe.

== Business ==
Dai is currently the executive chairman of Renhe Commercial Holdings Company Limited, a listed investment holding company which specialises in the operation of shopping centres transformed from air-raid shelters. The family-owned firm opened its first centre in 1992, and, by 2016, the firm had 23 malls. A year later, the company had centres in 30 cities across China, including Harbin, Guangzhou, Wuhan and Shenyang.

Dai's sister and business partner, Dai Xiuli, was once one of the richest women in the world, with an estimated fortune of $1.2 billion (£715 million). In 2017, she stepped back from the business and her controlling stake in Renhe was transferred to her brother as a free gift.

=== Football ===
==== Beijing Renhe ====
The siblings' interest in football is reported to have begun in the early 2000s when Dai Xiuli lived in England and watched Chinese defender Sun Jihai play for Manchester City. In 2007, they acquired Chinese club Shaanxi Baorong Chanba, relocating it to Guizhou in 2012 and then to Beijing in 2016, becoming Beijing Renhe. The club later folded, having previously competed in China League One.

==== Reading F.C. ====
In August 2016, the pair launched an attempted £130 million takeover of English Premier League club Hull City. Unsuccessful with that bid, in May 2017, Renhe bought 75% of the shares in English club Reading, after the Football League announced that it had no objections to the group's takeover.

In June 2017, it was announced that Dai had contacted Johan Plancke, chairman of Belgian club KSV Roeselare, to recruit two coaches to train Chinese youth coaches during an internship planned for August of the same year. Like Beijing Renhe in China, KSV Roeselare also folded following relegation and financial difficulties.

Reading's expenditure resulted in the club breaching English Football League (EFL) Financial Fair Play rules; over five years, the club reported pre-tax losses of £146 million, way beyond the EFL's limit of a £13 million annual pre-tax loss. In 2021, the club spent 234% of its revenue on player wages. In total, since taking ownership, Dai has invested more than £200m in the club, but has also found it increasingly difficult to transfer money from China to the UK.

In May 2023, Reading were relegated, after 10 years in the English second tier, having suffered a six point deduction for financial irregularities. In June 2023, Reading was charged by the EFL with failing to pay its players on time and in full, in October and November 2022, and April 2023, and with non-payment of taxes. Reading would start their 2023–24 League One season with points already deducted. Following the EFL's action, Reading fans groups urged Dai to sell the club as soon as possible, calling his stewardship "an unmitigated disaster" and citing the club's "excruciating financial losses": £146 million in the five years to June 2022. On 27 June 2023, Reading were served a winding-up petition by HMRC over the unpaid tax bills, with a hearing set for 9 August 2023. On 2 August 2023, Dai was reported to be seeking new investors to bring financial stability to the club.

On 16 August 2023, Reading had a point deducted (their third deduction in three consecutive seasons), and a further three-point deduction suspended, for its failures to pay players fully and on time during the 2022–23 season. Dai was ordered to pay 125% of the club's forecast monthly wages into a designated account. Failure to comply, or not paying wages on time up to 30 June 2024, would activate the suspended penalty; the three-point deduction was applied on 13 September 2023, dropping Reading to 21st in the table on two points, and Dai faced a misconduct charge.

On 29 September 2023, Dai said he was open to "credible offers of interest" to buy the club after another transfer embargo was imposed in respect to an outstanding tax bill. A 3–2 home defeat by Portsmouth on 28 October 2023 dropped the club to the bottom of League One on six points, eight from safety; the match was preceded by a fans protest against Dai's ownership. On 31 October 2023, the club was served another HMRC winding-up petition over unpaid taxes. On 1 November 2023, Reading were referred to an EFL independent disciplinary commission regarding unpaid HMRC debts owed in September and October 2023; an EFL hearing against Dai was scheduled for the end of November. Dai was fined £20,000 for Reading's wage failures on 19 December 2023. The EFL had recommended a 12-month ban from all football activities, but the disciplinary commission did not enforce it. A further £50,000 fine was suspended until 12 January 2024, and was triggered after Dai again failed to make the required full wage deposits.

On 13 January 2024, Reading's League One match against Port Vale was halted and subsequently abandoned after up to 1,000 fans invaded the pitch in protest against Dai's stewardship of the club. On 15 January 2024, after fining Dai £50,000 for failing to meet wage deadlines, the EFL said he must "fund the club adequately" or "make immediate arrangements to sell". On 16 January 2024, Reading CEO Dayong Pang said that, after two unsuccessful offers, Dai was "100% willing to sell the club" and "the selling process is ongoing". On 10 March 2024, Dai announced his plans to sell Reading's training ground Bearwood Park to raise funds for the maintenance of the club. The sale of the training ground was widely reported to have ended ongoing interest in the attempted sale of the club. An attempted takeover by former Wycombe Wanderers owner Rob Couhig collapsed in September 2024, and negotiations over an unnamed takeover bid expired in February 2025.

In March 2025, Dai was given until 4 April 2025 to sell the club after the EFL disqualified him under its Owners' and Directors' Test. The sale deadline was subsequently extended to 22 April; on that date, the club said it had agreed terms with a buyer, and the EFL extended its deadline to complete a deal to 5 May. The sale to Couhig was completed on 14 May.
