= Nelson Abbey =

English footballer (born 2003)

Personal information
- Full name: Nelson Ighodaro Abbey
- Date of birth: 28 August 2003 (age 23)
- Place of birth: Reading, England
- Position: Centre-back

Team information
- Current team: Rio Ave
- Number: 6

Youth career
- –2020: Reading

Senior career*
| Years | Team | Apps | (Gls) |
| 2020–2024 | Reading | 25 | (0) |
| 2024–2025 | Olympiacos | 5 | (0) |
| 2024 | → Swansea City (loan) | 0 | (0) |
| 2025 | → Rio Ave (loan) | 8 | (0) |
| 2025– | Rio Ave | 30 | (0) |

International career^{‡}
| 2020 | England U17 | 3 | (0) |
| 2023–2024 | England U20 | 5 | (0) |
- * Club domestic league appearances and goals as of 25 September 2026 ‡ National team caps and goals as of 13:27, 27 March 2024 (UTC)

Nelson Ighodaro Abbey (born 28 August 2003) is an English professional footballer who plays as a centre-back for Rio Ave.

== Club career ==
=== Reading ===
Abbey made his debut for Reading on 15 September 2020 as a substitute in a 1–0 EFL Cup defeat to Luton Town. Abbey signed his first professional contract with Reading on 15 December 2020, until the summer of 2022.

=== Olympiacos ===
On 24 January 2024, Abbey left Reading to sign for Super League Greece club Olympiacos for an undisclosed fee. At the club, Nelson was part of the 2023/24 UEFA Conference League winning side in which the club was able to win in a 1-0 Victory.

==== Swansea City (loan) ====
On 23 August 2024, Abbey joined EFL Championship club Swansea City on a season-long loan.

Abbey made his debut for the club in a 1-0 defeat to Wycombe Wanderers in the EFL Cup second round on 28 August 2024. On 3 January 2025, Abbey was recalled from his loan spell by Olympiacos, having made one appearance for Swansea City.

==== Rio Ave (loan - to buy) ====
On 7 January 2025, Abbey joined Primeira Liga club Rio Ave on loan for the remainder of the season. With the deal being permanent the following season.

== International career ==
Abbey was born in England, but is also of Nigerian and Dutch descent. He was called up to the England under-17 squad in February 2020. He has made three appearances for England at under-17 level.

On 6 October 2023, Abbey was called up to the England U20 team for the first time as a replacement for Reuell Walters.

== Career statistics ==
As of match played 14 September 2026

Appearances and goals by club, season and competition
| Club | Season | League | | | National cup (Note: Includes FA Cup, Taça de Portugal) | | League cup (Note: Includes EFL Cup) | | Europe | | Other | | Total | |
| Club | Season | Division | Apps | Goals | Apps | Goals | Apps | Goals | Apps | Goals | Apps | Goals | Apps | Goals |
|---|---|---|---|---|---|---|---|---|---|---|---|---|---|---|
| Reading | 2020–21 | Championship | 0 | 0 | 0 | 0 | 1 | 0 | – | | – | | 1 | 0 |
| Reading | 2021–22 | Championship | 0 | 0 | 0 | 0 | 1 | 0 | – | | – | | 1 | 0 |
| Reading | 2022–23 | Championship | 3 | 0 | 0 | 0 | 0 | 0 | – | | – | | 3 | 0 |
| Reading | 2023–24 | League One | 22 | 0 | 1 | 0 | 1 | 0 | – | | 2 (Note: Appearances in EFL Trophy) | 0 | 26 | 0 |
| Reading | Total | | 25 | 0 | 1 | 0 | 3 | 0 | – | | 2 | 0 | 31 | 0 |
| Olympiacos | 2023–24 | Super League Greece | 4 | 0 | 0 | 0 | – | | 0 | 0 | – | | 5 | 0 |
| Swansea City (loan) | 2024–25 | Championship | 0 | 0 | 0 | 0 | 1 | 0 | – | | – | | 1 | 0 |
| Rio Ave (loan) | 2024–25 | Primeira Liga | 8 | 0 | 2 | 0 | 0 | 0 | – | | – | | 10 | 0 |
| Rio Ave | 2025–26 | Primeira Liga | 26 | 0 | 1 | 0 | 0 | 0 | – | | – | | 27 | 0 |
| Rio Ave | 2026–27 | Primeira Liga | 4 | 0 | 0 | 0 | 0 | 0 | – | | – | | 4 | 0 |
| Rio Ave | Total | | 30 | 0 | 1 | 0 | 0 | 0 | – | | – | | 31 | 0 |
| Career total | | | 67 | 0 | 4 | 0 | 4 | 0 | 0 | 0 | 2 | 0 | 77 | 0 |
