= Anel Pirić =

Bosnian footballer (born 2004)

Personal information
- Date of birth: 28 May 2004 (age 22)
- Place of birth: Sarajevo, Bosnia and Herzegovina
- Height: 1.82 m (6 ft 0 in)
- Position: Winger

Team information
- Current team: Radnik Hadžići
- Number: 32

Youth career
- –2023: Željezničar

Senior career*
Years	Team	Apps	(Gls)
2023–2024	Igman Konjic	15	(0)
2024–2025	Goražde	24	(0)
2025–2026	Sarajevo B	0	(0)
2026–	Radnik Hadžići	12	(1)
- * Club domestic league appearances and goals as of 15 March 2026

Anel Pirić (born 28 May 2004) is a Bosnian professional footballer who plays as a winger for Bosnian First League club Radnik Hadžići.

== Club career ==
=== Igman Konjic ===
Pirić signed a professional contract with club Igman Konjic in August 2023. On 8 October 2023, he made his debut in a league match against Široki Brijeg.

== Career statistics ==
=== Club ===
As of match played 10 December 2023

Appearances and goals by club, season and competition
Club	Season	League			National cup		Europe		Total	
Club	Season	League	Apps	Goals	Apps	Goals	Apps	Goals	Apps	Goals
Igman Konjic	2023–24	Bosnian Premier League	7	0	0	0	–		7	0
Career total			7	0	0	0	0	0	7	0
