= Ben Elliott (footballer) =

English-Cameroonian footballer (born 2002)

Personal information
- Full name: Benjamin Njongoue Elliott
- Date of birth: 5 November 2002 (age 24)
- Place of birth: Kingston upon Thames, England
- Height: 1.80 m (5 ft 11 in)
- Position: Midfielder

Youth career
- 2011–2023: Chelsea

Senior career*
Years	Team	Apps	(Gls)
2023–2026	Reading	64	(2)

International career^{‡}
2016–2017	England U15	3	(0)
2018	England U16	1	(0)
2023–	Cameroon	5	(0)
- * Club domestic league appearances and goals as of 26 October 2025 ‡ National team caps and goals as of 5 February 2024

Benjamin Njongoue Elliott (born 5 November 2002) is a professional footballer who plays as a midfielder, most recently for EFL League One club Reading. Born in England, he represents Cameroon at international level.

== Club career ==
=== Chelsea ===
Born in Kingston upon Thames, Elliott joined the academy of Chelsea at the age of eight. He suffered a serious knee injury at the age of fifteen, keeping him out for two years. Following his return to action, he signed his first professional contract in November 2019. He was linked with a move away from The Blues in November 2021, with fellow Premier League side Southampton being strongly linked.

He was included in Chelsea's under-23 side for 2022–23 pre-season, scoring a goal against American side Real Monarchs in a 2–2 friendly game. Later in the same season, he travelled with the senior squad to Abu Dhabi for a warm weather training camp during the Premier League's mid-season break for the 2022 FIFA World Cup.

=== Reading ===
On 15 August 2023, Elliott joined EFL League One club Reading on a three-year contract. On 5 May 2026, Reading announced that Elliott's contract wouldn't be renewed once it expires on 30 June 2026, but that he would remain with the club whilst recovering from injury.

== International career ==
Elliott was born in England to a Cameroonian father and English mother, and is eligible to represent both England and Cameroon at international level. He had represented England at under-15 and under-16 level, captaining the under-15 side.

In March 2023, Elliott was called up to the Cameroon senior squad for the first time but did not have play time due to FIFA administration formalities that needed to be fulfilled so nationality could be changed.

On 10 June 2023, Elliott made his senior Cameroon debut in a friendly match against Mexico coming on as substitute for Bryan Mbeumo at Snapdragon Stadium in San Diego.

== Career statistics ==
=== Club ===
As of match played 25 October 2025

Appearances and goals by club, season and competition
Club	Season	League			FA Cup		EFL Cup		Europe		Other		Total	
Club	Season	Division	Apps	Goals	Apps	Goals	Apps	Goals	Apps	Goals	Apps	Goals	Apps	Goals
Chelsea U21	2021–22	—			—		—		—		2 (Note: Appearances in EFL Trophy)	0	2	0
Chelsea U21	2022–23	—			—		—		—		4	1	4	1
Chelsea U21	Total		—		—		—		—		6	1	6	1
Reading	2023–24	League One	37	0	2	0	1	0	—		2	1	42	1
Reading	2024–25	League One	19	2	2	0	1	0	—		2	0	24	2
Reading	2025–26	League One	8	0	0	0	3	0	—		2	0	13	0
Reading	Total		64	2	4	0	5	0	2	0	4	1	79	3
Career total			64	2	4	0	5	0	2	0	10	2	85	2

=== International ===
As of match played 9 January 2024

National team	Year	Apps	Goals
Cameroon	2023	4	0
Cameroon	2024	1	0
Total		5	0
