= League of Sarajevo Canton =

Bosnian and Herzegovnian football league

League of Sarajevo Canton (Bosnian: Kantonalna Liga) is a fourth level league in the Bosnia and Herzegovina football league system. The league champion is promoted to the Second League of the Federation of Bosnia and Herzegovina - Center. It is divided in two groups.

== Member clubs ==
=== Group A ===
List of clubs competing in 2020–21 season:

- NK Bojnik
- NK Jedinstvo Ljubnići
- NK Ozren Semizovac
- NK Pofalićki
- ŠFK Respekt
- NK Stup
- FK Vratnik

=== Group B ===
List of clubs competing in 2020–21 season:

- FK Baton
- FK Igman Ilidža
- FK Mladost Župča
- FK Butmir
- FK Hrid
- FK Saobraćajac
- FK El Tarik
- NK Omladinac Doglodi
