= List of Reading F.C. internationals =

This is a list of all full international footballers to play for Reading. Players who were capped while a Reading player are marked in bold.

== International representatives ==
As of match played 27 September 2026

The following list includes only players who either earnt caps whilst playing for Reading, marked in Bold, or had caps prior to joining the club. Players who went on to represent their country after leaving Reading, or whilst away on loan, are not included.

Key

*	Active national team player
§	Current Reading player
‡	Active national team and current Reading player
†	Active professional footballer

Name	Country	Overall			Reading		
Name	Country	Years	Caps	Goals	Years	Caps	Goals
**Joe Davies**	Wales	1899–00	11	0	1898–00	11	0
**Dai Evans**	Wales	1926–28	4	0	1924–28	4	0
Peter O'Sullivan	Wales	1973–78	3	1	1982–83	0	0
Nigel Stevenson	Wales	1982	4	0	1986	0	0
Nigel Vaughan	Wales	1982–84	10	0	1986–87	0	0
**Ady Williams**	Wales	1995–03	13	1	1989–96, 2000–04	8	0
Steve Morrow	Northern Ireland	1990–99	39	1	1990, 1991	0	0
Jim Leighton	Scotland	1982–98	91	0	1991–92	0	0
Mark McGhee	Scotland	1983–84	4	2	1991–93	0	0
**Jimmy Quinn**	Northern Ireland	1985–96	46	12	1992–97	17	6
Jeff Hopkins	Wales	1983–90	16	0	1992–97	0	0
Steve Archibald	Scotland	1980–86	27	4	1992	0	0
Paul Kee	Northern Ireland	1990–94	9	0	1993–94	0	0
Andy Bernal	Australia	1989–96	21	0	1994–00	0	0
Dariusz Wdowczyk	Poland	1979–98	53	2	1994–98	0	0
**Borislav Mihaylov**	Bulgaria	1983–99	102	0	1995–97		
Lee Nogan	Wales	1993–95	2	0	1995–97	0	0
Chris Woods	England	1985–93	43	0	1995	0	0
**Tommy Wright**	Northern Ireland	1989–99	31	0	1996	2	0
Paul Bodin	Wales	1990–94	23	3	1996–98	0	0
**Barry Hunter**	Northern Ireland	1995–99	14	1	1996–01	9	0
**Ray Houghton**	Republic of Ireland	1986–99	73	6	1997–99		
**Alan Maybury**	Republic of Ireland	1998–05	10	0	1998		
Michael O'Neill	Northern Ireland	1988–96	31	4	1998	0	0
Andy Legg	Wales	1996–01	6	0	1998	0	0
Robert Fleck	Scotland	1990–92	4	0	1998–99	0	0
**Graeme Murty**	Scotland	2004–07	4	0	1998–09	4	0
Peter Grant	Scotland	1989	2	0	1999–00	0	0
Mark Bowen	Wales	1986–97	31	3	1999	0	0
**Tony Rougier**	Trinidad and Tobago	1995–05	67	5	2000–03		
John Salako	England	1991	5	0	2001–04	0	0
**Nicky Shorey**	England	2007	2	0	2001–08, 2012–13	2	0
**Marcus Hahnemann**	United States	1994–11	9	0	2001–09		
**Shaun Goater**	Bermuda	1987–04	22	20	2003–05		
**Ívar Ingimarsson**	Iceland	1998–07	30	0	2003–11		
**Omar Daley**	Jamaica	2000–13	75	7	2003–04		
**Kelvin Jack**	Trinidad and Tobago	1997–06	33	0	2004		
**Lloyd Owusu**	Ghana	2005–06	4	0	2004–05		
**Ibrahima Sonko**	Senegal	2008	5	1	2004–08		
**Bobby Convey**	United States	2000–08	46	1	2004–09		
Les Ferdinand	England	1993–98	17	5	2005	0	0
Martin Keown	England	1992–02	43	2	2005	0	0
**Adam Federici**	Australia	2010–16	16	0	2005–15	10	0
**Brynjar Gunnarsson**	Iceland	1997–09	74	5	2005–13		
**Gylfi Sigurðsson**	Iceland	2010–20	78	25	2005–10		
**Simon Cox**	Republic of Ireland	2010–20	30	4	2005–08, 2014–16		
**Kevin Doyle**	Republic of Ireland	2006–17	62	14	2005–09		
**Stephen Hunt**	Republic of Ireland	2007–12	39	1	2005–09		
**Shane Long**	Republic of Ireland	2007–21	88	17	2005–11, 2022–23		
John Oster	Wales	1997–04	13	0	2005–08	0	0
**Ulises de la Cruz**	Ecuador	1995–10	101	6	2006–08		
**Alex Pearce**	Republic of Ireland	2012–17	7	2	2006–15		
**Seol Ki-hyeon**	South Korea	2000–09	82	19	2006–07		
**Sam Sodje**	Nigeria	2005–09	4	0	2006–09		
**Emerse Faé**	Ivory Coast	2005–12	41	1	2007–08		
**André Bikey**	Cameroon	2006–10	25	1	2007–09		
**Alan Bennett**	Republic of Ireland	2007	2	0	2007–09	2	0
**Kalifa Cissé**	Mali	2008–12	5	0	2007–10		
**Simon Church**	Wales	2009–16	38	3	2007–13		
**Hal Robson-Kanu**	Wales	2010–21	46	5	2007–16	35	4
**Marek Matějovský**	Czech Republic	2007–11	15	1	2008–10		
**Noel Hunt**	Republic of Ireland	2008–09	3	0	2008–13		
**Jimmy Kébé**	Mali	2005–09	2	0	2008–13		
**Darren O'Dea**	Republic of Ireland	2009–13	20	1	2009		
**Shaun Cummings**	Jamaica	2012–15	3	0	2009–15		
**Michael Hector**	Jamaica	2015–24	45	0	2009–15, 2015–16		
**Jobi McAnuff**	Jamaica	2002–16	32	1	2009–14		
Grzegorz Rasiak	Poland	2002–07	37	8	2009–10	0	0
**Jake Taylor**	Wales	2014	1	0	2009–16	1	0
**Zurab Khizanishvili**	Georgia	1999–15	93	1	2010–11		
Gunnar Heiðar Þorvaldsson	Iceland	2005–18	24	5	2010	0	0
Ian Harte	Republic of Ireland	1996–07	64	12	2010–13	0	0
**Mikele Leigertwood**	Antigua and Barbuda	2008–14	11	1	2011–14		
**Kaspars Gorkšs**	Latvia	2005–17	86	5	2011–14		
Jason Roberts	Grenada	1999–08	16	14	2012–14	0	0
**Adrian Mariappa**	Jamaica	2012–22	72	1	2012–13		
**Garath McCleary**	Jamaica	2013–16	24	3	2012–20	24	3
Pavel Pogrebnyak	Russia	2006–12	33	8	2012–15	0	0
**Chris Gunter**	Wales	2007–22	109	0	2012–20		
Wayne Bridge	England	2002–09	36	1	2013–14	0	0
**Stephen Kelly**	Republic of Ireland	2006–14	39	0	2013–15	7	0
Royston Drenthe	Netherlands	2010	1	0	2013–15	0	0
**Hope Akpan**	Nigeria	2014–15	4	0	2013–15	4	0
**Danny Williams**	United States	2011–17	23	2	2013–17		
**Chris Baird**	Northern Ireland	2003–16	79	0	2013–14	2	0
**Oliver Norwood**	Northern Ireland	2010–18	57	0	2014–16		
Jamie Mackie	Scotland	2010–12	9	2	2014–15	0	0
Zat Knight	England	2005	2	0	2015	0	0
Yakubu	Nigeria	2000–12	57	21	2015	0	0
Matěj Vydra	Czech Republic	2012–21	48	7	2015–16	2	0
**Paul McShane**	Republic of Ireland	2006–16	33	0	2015–19	1	0
**Stephen Quinn**	Republic of Ireland	2013–16	18	0	2015–18	3	0
Ola John	Netherlands	2013	1	0	2015–16	0	0
**Luke Southwood**	Northern Ireland	2022–	1	0	2015–23	1	0
**Ali Al-Habsi**	Oman	2002–19	135	0	2015–17		
**Paolo Hurtado**	Peru	2011–19	38	3	2015–17		
Orlando Sá	Portugal	2009	1	0	2015–16	0	0
**Anssi Jaakkola**	Finland	2011–21	3	0	2016–19	2	0
**Yakou Méïté**	Ivory Coast	2019–	3	0	2016–23	3	0
**Liam Moore**	Jamaica	2021	9	0	2016–23	9	0
**Deniss Rakels**	Latvia	2010–19	32	1	2016–18		
**Sandro Wieser**	Liechtenstein	2010–	69	2	2016–18		
Roy Beerens	Netherlands	2010–11	2	0	2016–18	0	0
**Leandro Bacuna**	Curaçao	2016–	79	17	2017–19	6	5
**Modou Barrow**	Gambia	2015–22	18	2	2017–20	1	0
**Jón Daði Böðvarsson**	Iceland	2012–22	64	4	2017–19	10	0
**Adrian Popa**	Romania	2012–17	24	3	2017–20	1	0
**David Edwards**	Wales	2007–17	43	3	2017–19	4	0
Sone Aluko	Nigeria	2009–15	7	2	2017–21	0	0
Chris Martin	Scotland	2014–17	17	3	2018	0	0
**Andy Yiadom**†	Ghana	2017–22	26	0	2018–26	22	0
**Jökull Andrésson**†	Iceland	2022–	1	0	2018–24	1	0
**David Meyler**	Republic of Ireland	2012–18	26	0	2018–19	1	0
**Saeid Ezatolahi***	Iran	2015–	88	2	2018–19	3	0
John O'Shea	Republic of Ireland	2001–18	118	3	2018–19	0	0
**Marc McNulty**	Scotland	2019	2	0	2018–22	2	0
Nélson Oliveira†	Portugal	2012–17	17	2	2019	0	0
**Matt Miazga**†	United States	2015–	28	1	2019, 2019–20	2	0
**Lucas João**†	Portugal	2015	2	0	2019–23	0	0
**Lucas João**†	Angola	2022–	5	1	2019–23	4	1
Rafael Cabral†	Brazil	2012	3	0	2019–22	0	0
**Pelé**	Guinea-Bissau	2017–22	23	1	2019–20	4	0
**George Pușcaș**†	Romania	2018–	46	11	2019–23	18	4
Charlie Adam	Scotland	2007–15	26	0	2019–20	0	0
Ayub Masika	Kenya	2012–	32	5	2020	0	0
**Coniah Boyce-Clarke**†	Jamaica	2023–	1	0	2020–25	1	0
**Nahum Melvin-Lambert**	Saint Lucia	2023–	1	0	2020–23	1	0
**Alfa Semedo**†	Guinea-Bissau	2021–	38	2	2020–21	2	1
**Mamadi Camará***	Guinea-Bissau	2022–	10	0	2021–26	8	0
Andy Carroll	England	2010–12	9	2	2021–22, 2022–23	0	0
**Jeriel Dorsett**§	Montserrat	2023–	11	0	2021–	11	0
Danny Drinkwater	England	2016	3	0	2021–22	0	0
Alen Halilović†	Croatia	2013–19	10	0	2021–22	0	0
**Junior Hoilett***	Canada	2015–2026	70	17	2021–23	20	1
**Baba Rahman***	Ghana	2017–	54	1	2021–22, 2022–23	13	0
Karl Hein†	Estonia	2020–	49	0	2022	0	0
**Ørjan Nyland***	Norway	2013–	79	0	2022	5	0
**Terell Thomas***	Saint Lucia	2022–	22	1	2022	2	0
**Jeff Hendrick**	Republic of Ireland	2013–23	79	2	2022–23	4	0
Mamadou Loum†	Senegal	2019–	3	0	2022–23	0	0
**Basil Tuma***	Malta	2024–	9	0	2022–26	8	0
**Tyler Bindon***	New Zealand	2023–	32	3	2023–25	17	2
**Ben Elliott**†	Cameroon	2023–	5	0	2023–26	4	0
**Charlie Savage**§	Wales	2023–	3	0	2023–	3	0
Liam Fraser§	Canada	2019–	19	0	2025–	0	0
Paddy Lane§	Northern Ireland	2022–	4	0	2025–	0	0
Derrick Williams	Republic of Ireland	2018–19	3	1	2025–26	0	0
Matt Ritchie	Scotland	2015–18	16	3	2025–26	0	0
Andy Rinomhota‡	Zimbabwe	2023–	15	0	2018-2022, 2025–	1	0
Will Keane†	Republic of Ireland	2021–23	5	0	2026	0	0
Ryan Nyambe†	Namibia	2019–	18	0	2026	0	0
Jacob Brown§	Scotland	2021–23	8	0	2026–	0	0
Jamie Reid‡	Northern Ireland	2024–	12	2	2026–	0	0

1. The player's international record across their whole career.
2. The player's international record whilst playing for Reading.
3. Born in England
4. Born in France
5. Born in Germany
6. Born in Liberia
7. Born in the Netherlands
8. Born in Nigeria
9. Born in Uganda
10. Born in West Germany

Country	Players	Caps	Goals
Angola	1	5	1
Antigua and Barbuda	1	11	1
Australia	2	37	0
Bermuda	1	22	20
Brazil	1	3	0
Bulgaria	1	102	0
Cameroon	2	30	1
Canada	2	89	17
Croatia	1	10	0
Curaçao	1	79	17
Czech Republic	2	61	8
Ecuador	1	101	6
England	9	160	10
Estonia	1	48	0
Finland	1	3	0
Gambia	1	18	2
Georgia	1	93	1
Ghana	3	84	1
Grenada	1	16	14
Guinea-Bissau	3	71	3
Iceland	6	271	39
Iran	1	88	2
Ivory Coast	2	44	1
Jamaica	8	261	12
Kenya	1	32	5
Latvia	2	118	6
Liechtenstein	1	69	2
Mali	2	7	0
Malta	1	9	0
Montserrat	1	11	0
Namibia	1	18	0
Netherlands	3	4	0
New Zealand	1	32	3
Nigeria	4	72	23
Northern Ireland	11	323	20
Norway	1	79	0
Oman	1	135	0
Peru	1	38	3
Poland	2	90	10
Portugal	3	20	2
Republic of Ireland	19	719	63
Romania	2	70	14
Russia	1	33	8
Saint Lucia	2	23	1
Scotland	12	210	14
Senegal	2	8	1
South Korea	1	82	19
Trinidad and Tobago	2	100	5
United States	4	106	4
Wales	18	376	19
Zimbabwe	1	15	0
Total	153	4,515	378

== International tournaments ==
=== World Cup ===
The following were part of World Cup squads while playing for Reading.

Tournament	Players
2006 FIFA World Cup	(United States) Bobby Convey, (United States) Marcus Hahnemann
2010 FIFA World Cup	(Australia) Adam Federici
2018 FIFA World Cup	(Iceland) Jón Daði Böðvarsson
2022 FIFA World Cup	(Canada) Junior Hoilett, (Ghana) Baba Rahman, (Senegal) Mamadou Loum

=== CAF Africa Cup of Nations ===
The following were part of African Cup of Nations squads while playing for Reading.

Tournament	Players
2008 Africa Cup of Nations	(Cameroon) André Bikey, (Ivory Coast) Emerse Faé, (Senegal) Ibrahima Sonko
2019 Africa Cup of Nations	(Ghana) Andy Yiadom
2021 Africa Cup of Nations	(Ghana) Andy Yiadom, (Ghana) Baba Rahman
2023 Africa Cup of Nations	(Cameroon) Ben Elliott
2025 Africa Cup of Nations	(Zimbabwe) Andy Rinomhota

=== CONCACAF Gold Cup ===
The following were part of Gold Cup squads while playing for Reading.

Tournament	Players
2005 Gold Cup	(United States) Marcus Hahnemann
2015 Gold Cup	(Jamaica) Michael Hector, (Jamaica) Garath McCleary
2019 Gold Cup	(Canada) Callum Harriott, (United States) Matt Miazga
2023 Gold Cup	(Jamaica) Liam Moore
2023 Gold Cup	(Canada) Junior Hoilett, (Jamaica) Coniah Boyce-Clarke

=== OFC Men's Nations Cup ===
The following were part of OFC Men's Nations Cup squads while playing for Reading.

Tournament	Players
2024 OFC Men's Nations Cup	(New Zealand) Tyler Bindon

=== UEFA European Championship ===
The following were part of European Championship squads while playing for Reading.

Tournament	Players
UEFA Euro 1996	(Bulgaria) Borislav Mihaylov
UEFA Euro 2008	(Czech Republic) Marek Matějovský
UEFA Euro 2016	(Northern Ireland) Oliver Norwood, (Republic of Ireland) Stephen Quinn, (Wales) Chris Gunter, (Wales) Hal Robson-Kanu
