= Claudio Osorio (footballer) =

East Timorese footballer

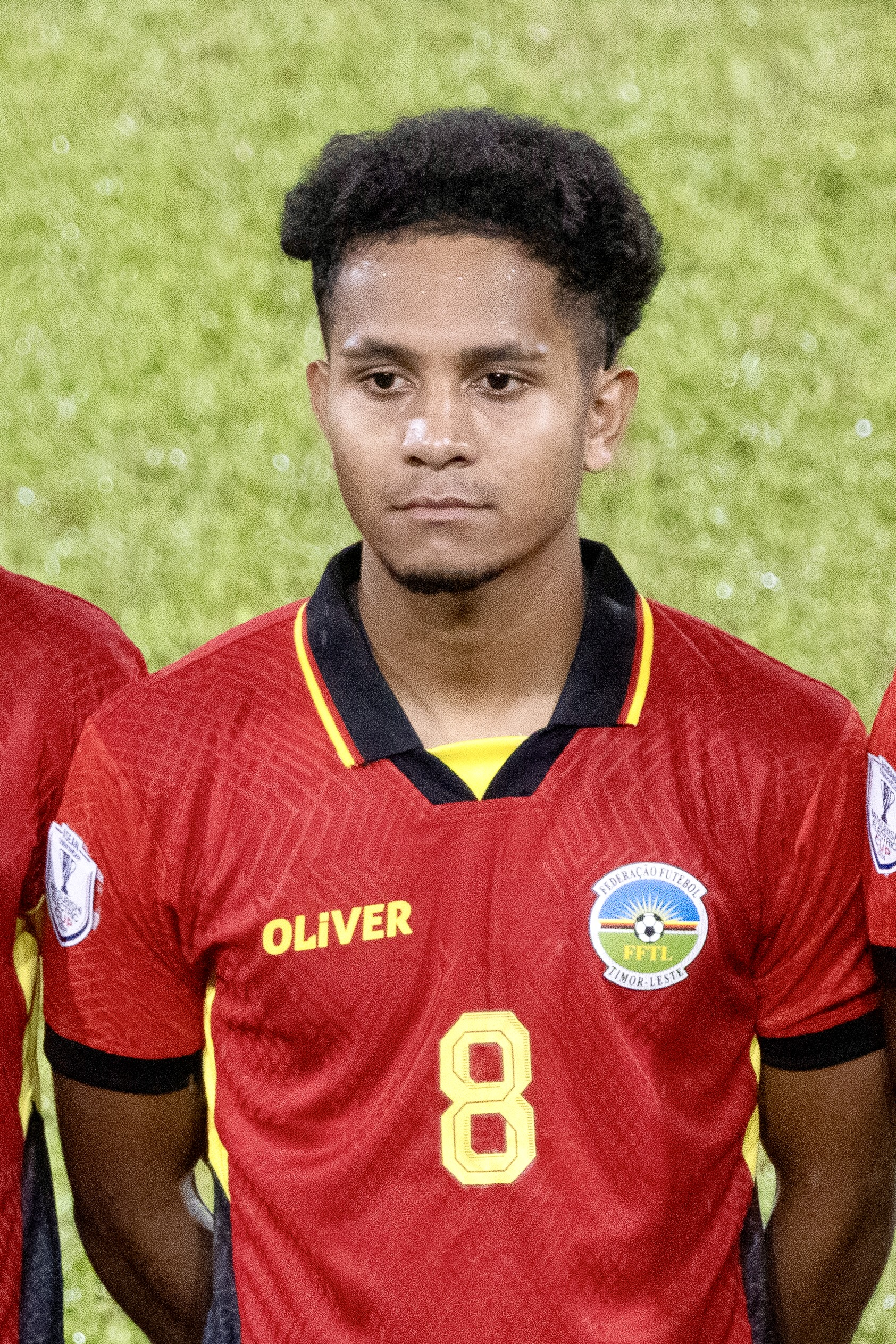
- Osorio playing for Timor-Leste in 2024

Personal information
- Full name: Claudio Gomes Osorio
- Date of birth: 26 September 2002 (age 24)
- Place of birth: Fatuhada, Timor-Leste
- Height: 1.67 m (5 ft 6 in)
- Position: Attacking midfielder

Team information
- Current team: O Elvas

Youth career
- 2013–2018: Reading

Senior career*
Years	Team	Apps	(Gls)
2018–2023	Reading	0	(0)
2023	→ Cobh Ramblers (loan)	9	(0)
2023–2025	Karketu Dili		
2025–2026	Persipal Palu	3	(0)
2026	Cobh Ramblers	6	(0)
2026–	O Elvas		

International career^{‡}
2016–2017	England U15	5	(1)
2017	England U16	1	(0)
2024–	Timor-Leste	22	(1)
- * Club domestic league appearances and goals as of 29 June 2026 ‡ National team caps and goals as of 5 October 2026

Claudio Gomes Osorio (born 26 September 2002) is a Timorese professional footballer who plays as an attacking midfielder for Campeonato de Portugal club O Elvas and the Timor-Leste national team.

Born in Timor-Leste, he represented England at youth level, before switching to play for Timor-Leste at senior level.

== Early life ==
Osorio was born in Fatuhada, Timor-Leste and moved to Northern Ireland at the age of six, before moving to England at eleven.

== Club career ==
=== Reading ===
Osorio joined Reading's academy when he was 11-years old. In September 2019, Osorio signed his first professional contract with Reading. He made his professional debut with the club in a 3–0 EFL Cup loss to Swansea City on 10 August 2021.

On 17 May 2023, Reading announced that Osorio would leave the club upon the expiration of his contract at the end of June 2023.

=== Karketu Dili ===
In May 2024, it was reported that Osorio had returned to Timor-Leste, and had signed with Karketu Dili ahead of representing Timor-Leste at full international level.

=== Persipal Palu ===
On 27 August 2025, Indonesian club Persipal Palu announced the signing of Osorio.

=== Cobh Ramblers return ===
On 27 January 2026, League of Ireland First Division club Cobh Ramblers announced the return of Osorio for the 2026 season. On 1 July 2026, Cobh announced that Osorio had left the club after making 7 appearances for the club.

== International career ==
=== Youth ===
Osorio is a youth international for England, having represented the England U15 playing one match on 17 December 2016 in a 5–2 win over Turkey U15.

=== Senior ===
In May 2024, Osorio was called up to play for the Timor-Leste national team, the country of origin of his parents.

Osorio scored his first international goal on 9 June 2026 against Brunei during the 2026 ASEAN Championship qualification at the Kuala Lumpur Stadium.

== Career statistics ==
=== Club ===
As of match played 19 June 2026

Appearances and goals by club, season and competition
Club	Season	League			National Cup (Note: Includes FA Cup & FAI Cup)		League Cup (Note: Includes EFL Cup & League of Ireland Cup)		Other		Total	
Club	Season	Division	Apps	Goals	Apps	Goals	Apps	Goals	Apps	Goals	Apps	Goals
Reading	2020–21	Championship	0	0	0	0	0	0	—		0	0
Reading	2021–22	Championship	0	0	1	0	1	0	—		2	0
Reading	2022–23	Championship	0	0	0	0	0	0	—		0	0
Reading	Total		0	0	1	0	1	0	—		2	0
Cobh Ramblers (loan)	2023	League of Ireland First Division	9	0	0	0	0	0	—		9	0
Persipal Palu	2025–26	Championship	3	0	0	0	0	0	—		3	0
Cobh Ramblers	2026	League of Ireland First Division	6	0	0	0	0	0	—		6	0
Career total			18	0	1	0	1	0	0	0	20	0

=== International ===
As of match played 30 September 2026

Timor-Leste national team
Year	Apps	Goals
2024	8	0
2025	6	0
2026	8	1
Total	22	1

=== International goals ===
No.	Date	Venue	Opponent	Score	Result	Competition
1.	9 June 2026	Kuala Lumpur Stadium, Kuala Lumpur, Malaysia	Brunei	2–1	3–1	2026 ASEAN Championship qualification
