= John Clarke (footballer, born 2004) =

English footballer (born 2004)

Personal information
- Full name: John Robert Clarke
- Date of birth: 24 April 2004 (age 22)
- Place of birth: Manchester, England
- Position: Left-back

Team information
- Current team: 1874 northwich

Youth career
- Stockport Town
- 2021–2022: Port Vale

Senior career*
Years	Team	Apps	(Gls)
2022–2026	Reading	3	(0)
2026	→ Slough Town (loan)	8	(0)
2026–	Bury	0	(0)

International career
2022	Republic of Ireland U19	2	(0)
- * Club domestic league appearances and goals as of 22:23, 30 July 2026 (UTC)

John Robert Clarke (born 24 April 2004) is an Irish footballer who plays as a left-back for Northern Premier League Premier Division club Bury. He began his career at Reading and played on loan at Slough Town.

== Club career ==
=== Reading ===
Clarke joined Port Vale's youth team from Stockport Town in 2021. On 22 June 2022, Reading signed Clarke to join their under-23 team. After impressing during the 2022–23 pre-season, Clarke made his debut for Reading on 6 August, coming on as a late substitute for Junior Hoilett in their 2–1 victory over Cardiff City at the Madejski Stadium. However, manager Paul Ince confirmed that Clarke missed the rest of the season after sustaining a knee ligament injury in December. He signed a new contract in July 2023. He returned to fitness in December 2023. On 23 May 2024, Reading announced they had extended their contract with Clarke for another season.

On 16 May 2025, Reading announced that they had offered a new contract to Clarke, with a new one-year contract being confirmed as signed on 23 June. On 6 March 2026, Clarke joined Slough Town on a one-month loan deal, linking up with fellow Royals loanees Basil Tuma and Jacob Borgnis at the club. He played eight National League South games for Slough in what remained of the 2025–26 season, and was released upon his return to Reading.

=== Bury ===
On 28 July 2026, Clarke joined newly promoted Northern Premier League Premier Division club Bury following a successful trial.

== International career ==
Clarke was called up to the Republic of Ireland under-19 team for the first time in August 2022 for a three-day training camp. He made his debut for the U19 team on 24 September 2022, in a 2–0 win over Wales U19 in a 2023 UEFA European Under-19 Championship qualifier.

== Style of play ==
Clarke is an attacking left-back.

== Career statistics ==
As of match played 18 April 2026

Appearances and goals by club, season and competition
Club	Season	League			FA Cup		EFL Cup		Other		Total	
Club	Season	Division	Apps	Goals	Apps	Goals	Apps	Goals	Apps	Goals	Apps	Goals
Reading	2022–23	EFL Championship	3	0	0	0	1	0	—		4	0
Reading	2023–24	EFL League One	0	0	0	0	0	0	0	0	0	0
Reading	2024–25	EFL League One	0	0	0	0	0	0	0	0	0	0
Reading	2025–26	EFL League One	0	0	0	0	0	0	0	0	0	0
Reading	Total		3	0	0	0	1	0	0	0	4	0
Slough Town (loan)	2025–26	National League South	8	0	—		—		—		8	0
Bury	2026–27	Northern Premier League; Premier Division	0	0	0	0	0	0	0	0	0	0
Career total			11	0	0	0	1	0	0	0	12	0
