= 2022–23 Reading F.C. season =

Reading
2022–23 season
- Owner: Dai Yongge and Dai Xiuli (majority)
- Manager: Paul Ince (until 11 April); Noel Hunt (interim, from 11 April)
- Stadium: Madejski Stadium
- Championship: 22nd (relegated)
- FA Cup: Fourth round (eliminated by Manchester United)
- EFL Cup: First round (eliminated by Stevenage)
- Top goalscorer: League: Tom Ince (9); Andy Carroll (9); All: Tom Ince (9); Andy Carroll (9)
- Highest home attendance: 21,919 vs Wigan Athletic (29 April 2023)
- Lowest home attendance: 4,230 vs Stevenage (17 August 2022)
- Average home league attendance: 13,449
Home colours	Away colours	Third colours

The 2022–23 season was Reading's 152nd year in existence and tenth consecutive season in the Championship, and covers the period from 1 July 2022 to 30 June 2023.

== Season review ==
=== Pre-season ===
On 16 May, Paul Ince was confirmed as Reading's permanent manager, with Mark Bowen also returning to the club as Head of Football Operations.

On 26 May, West Bromwich Albion announced the signing of John Swift.

On 30 May, Reading confirmed that the squad would return for pre-season training on 20 June, with the squad spending a week training at St George's Park National Football Centre before taking part in a series of pre-season friendlies. The following day, 31 May, Reading announced their first pre-season friendly, a trip to Plough Lane to face AFC Wimbledon on 14 July.

On 6 June, Reading announced that they would end their week-long training camp at St George's Park National Football Centre, with a behind-closed-doors friendly against Benfica.

On 8 June, Reading announced a home friendly against West Ham United at the Madejski Stadium on 16 July, and a behind-closed-doors friendly against Maidenhead United on 12 July at their Bearwood Park training ground.

On 15 June, Reading announced a friendly against Brighton & Hove Albion was announced the same day, to be played at 3pm, 23 July at the Madejski Stadium, whilst a behind-closed-doors friendly against Colchester United was also announced for 2 July.

On 21 June, Stoke City announced the signing of Josh Laurent.

On 23 June, the EFL Championship scheduled was released for the season, with Reading starting their season with an away trip to Blackpool on 30 July and ending the season with an away trip to Huddersfield Town on 6 May 2023. The following day, Cardiff City announced the signing of Andy Rinomhota.

On 8 July, Reading confirmed that Andy Yiadom had been appointed as the clubs new Club Captain.

==== Transfers and contracts ====
On 20 May, Reading confirmed that they had offered new contracts to Tom Holmes, Josh Laurent, Andy Rinomhota, Femi Azeez and Andy Yiadom, whilst also confirming the departure of loanees Danny Drinkwater, Tom Dele-Bashiru, Baba Rahman, Tom Ince and Karl Hein. Additionally the club confirmed that Terell Thomas, Brandon Barker, Ørjan Nyland, Felipe Araruna, Alen Halilović and Marc McNulty would leave the club upon the expiry of their contract at the end of June and the contract discussions where on going with Junior Hoilett, Michael Morrison and John Swift. Reading also offered new professional contracts to under-23 players Nelson Abbey, Jeriel Dorsett, Imari Samuels, Claudio Osorio, Kian Leavy, Rashawn Scott, Kelvin Ehibhatiomhan and Nahum Melvin-Lambert, and to under-18 players Mamadi Camara, Jahmari Clarke, Tyrell Ashcroft and Louie Holzman. Pro terms where also offered to Hamid Abdel Salam, Sam Paul, Matthew Rowley and Benjamin Purcell, with Ajani Giscombe, Harvey Maudner and David Nyarko also having their contracts extended for an additional year. The club also confirmed the departure of Ethan Bristow, James Holden, Lynford Sackey and Malachi Talent-Aryeetey while Jordan Addo-Antoine.

On 15 June, the EFL released the Retained List for each club, which confirmed contract renewals for Jahmari Clarke, Tyrell Ashcroft, Louie Holzman, Harvey Collins, Hamid Abdel-Salam, Sam Paul, Matt Rowley, Benjamin Purcell, Jeriel Dorsett and Kian Leavy.

On 17 June, Tom Holmes and Andy Yiadom both signed a new three-year contracts with Reading.

On 19 June, Reading announced their first signing of the summer, with Joe Lumley signing on loan from Middlesbrough for the season. The following day, 20 June, during a pre-season interview with him, Reading confirmed that they had triggered a clause in Jeriel Dorsett's contract that would extend his stay with Reading until the summer of 2023.

On 21 June, Reading announced the signing of Tom Ince to a three-year contract beginning 1 July once his Stoke City contract expires.

On 22 June, Reading announced the signings of Michael Craig and John Clarke to the U23 team, whilst confirming new contracts had been signed with Michael Stickland, Louie Holzman, Kian Leavy and Jeriel Dorsett.

On 24 June, Reading announced that Mamadi Camará, Rashawn Scott, Nelson Abbey, Matt Rowley, Sam Paul, Benjamin Purcell and Claudio Osorio had all signed new contracts with the club for the 2022–23 season.

On 27 June, Reading announced the signing of Dean Bouzanis from Sutton United to a three-year contract.

On 1 July, Tottenham Hotspur announced that Tyrell Ashcroft had joined their academy.

On 2 July, Reading confirmed that Femi Azeez had signed a new contract with the club until the summer 2024, whilst Nahum Melvin-Lambert and Hamid Abdel Salam had also both signed new contract with the club for the 2022–23 season.

On 5 July, Reading confirmed that both Junior Hoilett and Kelvin Ehibhatiomhan had signed new contracts with Reading, Hoilett until the summer of 2023 and Ehibhatiomhan the summer of 2024.

On 7 July, Reading confirmed that Jahmari Clarke had signed a new contract with the club. The following day, 8 July, Reading announced the signing of Tyrese Fornah on a season-long loan deal from Nottingham Forest.

On 12 July, Reading announced the season-long loan signing of Jeff Hendrick from Newcastle United. The following day, 13 July, Reading announced the return of Shane Long on a one-year contract after he'd left Southampton earlier in the summer.

On 20 July, Reading announced the signing of Sam Hutchinson to a two-year contract, after he'd impressed on trial following the expiration of his Sheffield Wednesday contract at the end of June 2022. The following day, 21 July, Tom Holmes was confirmed as Readings Vice-Captain for the season, behind Captain Andy Yiadom.

On 22 July, Luke Southwood joined Cheltenham Town on a season-long loan deal.

On 29 July, Reading announced the signing of Nesta Guinness-Walker to a one-year contract after impressing on trial following the expiration of his AFC Wimbledon contract at the end of the previous season. Later the same day, Reading announced the signing of Mamadou Loum on a season-long loan deal from Porto.

=== July ===
Reading started the season with an away match against Blackpool, where an early goal from Callum Connolly gave the hosts all three points.

=== August ===
On 5 August, Jeriel Dorsett joined Kilmarnock on a season-long loan deal. The following day, 6 August, Reading hosted Cardiff City at the Madejski Stadium. Reading went behind in the 4th minute after Callum O'Dowda netted for the visitors, but then a penalty in the 27th minute from Shane Long saw the teams even at the break. In the second half a strike from Tom Ince secured all three points for Reading.

On 19 August, Reading announced that Ayyuba Jambang, Ethan Burnett, Josh Green and Adrian Akande had all joined the U21s set up.

On 25 August, Reading confirmed that George Pușcaș had joined Genoa on a season-long loan deal. The following day, 26 August, Reading announced the signing of Naby Sarr to a four-year contract after a successful trial period.

On 31 August, Reading confirmed the return of Baba Rahman on loan from Chelsea for the season.

=== September ===
On 8 September, manager Paul Ince was nominated for EFL Championship Manager of the Month for August.

On 9 September, Readings away trip to Watford, scheduled for 10 September, was postponed after the EFL postponed all football fixtures from 9 – 11 September as a mark of respect following the death of Elizabeth II the previous day.

On 12 September, Reading announced that Nahum Melvin-Lambert had signed for Hemel Hempstead Town on a one-month youth loan deal. Later the same day, Reading confirmed that their postponed match against Watford from 9 September, would now be played at 19:45 on 8 November.

On 13 September, Reading confirmed the singing of Amadou Mbengue on a short-term contract until January 2023 after training with the club since leaving Metz during the summer and that Abraham Kanu had also signed his first professional club with the club. The following day, 14 September, Ethan Burnett joined Havant & Waterlooville on loan until January 2023. On 15 September, Andy Carroll returned to the club, signing a 4-month contract with the club, until January 2023.

On 30 September, Reading announced the signing of Lui Bradbury on a free transfer to their Under-21 set-up, after he'd left Leeds United during the summer, whilst Benjamin Purcell joined Hartley Wintney on a one-month loan deal and David Nyarko joined Thatcham Town on a month-long work experience placement.

=== October ===
On 29 October, Reading announced that Jahmari Clarke had joined Woking on a month-long youth loan deal.

=== December ===
On 14 December, Reading recalled Benjamin Purcell from his loan with Hartley Wintney, and immediately loaned him to Farnborough.

=== January ===
On 10 January, Andy Carroll signed a contract extension with Reading, keeping at the club until the summer of 2024.

On 13 January, Reading announced that Amadou Mbengue had extended his contract with the club until the end of the season, with a view to a further extension.

On 24 January, Jökull Andrésson returned to Exeter City on an emergency-loan deal, and Ben Purcell extended his loan deal at Farnborough for an additional month.

On 30 January, Reading announced the signing of Cesare Casadei from Chelsea on loan for the remainder of the season.

On 31 January, after his emergency-loan to Exeter City ended, Jökull Andrésson joined Stevenage on loan for the remainder of the season. On the same day, Jahmari Clarke joined Forest Green Rovers on loan for the remainder of the season.

=== February ===
On 3 February, Nahum Melvin-Lambert joined Weymouth on a one-month loan deal, with David Nyarko joining him at Weymouth on a work experience deal.

On 8 February, Kian Leavy joined Shelbourne on loan until the summer transfer window.

On 15 February, Reading announced the signing of Matthew Carson following a successful trial, and Benjamin Purcell was recalled from his loan deal with Farnborough.

On 21 February, Matt Rowley joined Bognor Regis Town on loan until 23 April.

On 22 February, Benjamin Purcell joined Kingstonian on loan for the remainder of the season, whilst Claudio Osorio joined Cobh Ramblers on loan until the end of June.

=== March ===
On 1 March, there were reports that the team were facing another six-point deduction for breaching profitability and sustainability rules.

=== April ===
On 4 April, the club and the EFL confirmed that the club had failed to satisfy a business plan agreed after a historical breach of the EFL's Profit and Sustainability limits. As a result, they received a six-point deduction. The sanction meant that they were just one point above the relegation zone. It was their second points deduction after the club were docked six points during the 2021–22 season.

On 11 April, Paul Ince's contract as First Team Manager was terminated, with Under-21 Manager Noel Hunt appointed as Interim Manager until the end of the season.

=== May ===
On 4 May, Huddersfield Town's victory over Sheffield United confirmed Reading's relegation to League One. It would be the Royals' first time in the third division in 21 years.

On 17 May, Reading announced an update on out of contract players for the upcoming season, with Scott Dann, Luke Southwood, Shane Long, Liam Moore, Lucas João and Dejan Tetek all departing when their contracts expire at the end of June, whilst Nesta Guinness-Walker had a clause activated in his contract that will see him part of the squad for the 2023–24 season. Additionally, Yakou Meite had been offered a new contract, Amadou Mbengue had been offered a new two-year contract and Junior Hoilett a new one-year contract. From the U21 squad, Coniah Boyce-Clarke had been offered a three-year contract, and John Clarke had been offered a new one-year contract, whist Hamid Abdel-Salam, Adrian Akande, Harvey Collins, Matt Rowley and Michael Stickland all had clauses in their contracts triggered for the 2023–24 season. Matthew Carson and Jeriel Dorsett were also offered new contract. Meanwhile, Lui Bradbury, Ethan Burnett, Josh Green, Nahum Melvin-Lambert, Kian Leavy, Claudio Osorio and Rashawn Scott would all leave the club at the end of their contract. The club also offered first professional contract with the club to Harvey Maudner, Jacob Borgnis, Tom Norcott, Caylan Vickers, Jeremiah Okine-Peters and Basil Tuma, whilst David Nyarko, Ryley Campbell, Kyle Daniel-Spray, Harrison Furlong, Louis Hutchings, Troy Murray, Zion Nditi and Aston Greaver would all leave the club.

=== June ===
On 11 June, Qatar Stars League club Al-Markhiya announced the signing of Naby Sarr.

On 21 June, with the opening of the Transfer Window, Reading confirmed that George Pușcaș had left the club join Genoa for an undisclosed fee, paid to the club in instalments and that Yakou Méïté had turned down a new contract with the club.

On 27 June, Reading confirmed that Tom Ince had left the club to sign for Watford for an undisclosed fee.

== Transfers ==
=== In ===
Date	Position	Nationality	Name	From	Fee	Ref.
21 June 2022†	FW	(England)	Tom Ince	Stoke City	Free	
22 June 2022†	DF	(Republic of Ireland)	John Clarke	Port Vale	Free	
22 June 2022	MF	(Scotland)	Michael Craig	Unattached	Free	
27 June 2022†	GK	(Australia)	Dean Bouzanis	Sutton United	Free	
13 July 2022	FW	(Republic of Ireland)	Shane Long	Unattached	Free	
20 July 2022	DF	(England)	Sam Hutchinson	Unattached	Free	
29 July 2022	DF	(England)	Nesta Guinness-Walker	Unattached	Free	
19 August 2022	DF	(England)	Ayyuba Jambang	Unattached	Free	
19 August 2022	MF	(England)	Ethan Burnett	Unattached	Free	
19 August 2022	MF	(England)	Josh Green	Unattached	Free	
19 August 2022	FW	(Nigeria)	Adrian Akande	Unattached	Free	
26 August 2022	DF	(France)	Naby Sarr	Unattached	Free	
13 September 2022	MF	(Senegal)	Amadou Mbengue	Unattached	Free	
15 September 2022	FW	(England)	Andy Carroll	Unattached	Free	
30 September 2022	FW	(England)	Lui Bradbury	Unattached	Free	
15 February 2023	DF	(England)	Matthew Carson	Unattached	Free	

† Transfers announced on the above date, but was not finalised until 1 July 2022 as free agents.

=== Loans in ===
Start date	Position	Nationality	Name	From	End date	Ref.
19 June 2022	GK	(England)	Joe Lumley	Middlesbrough	End of Season	
8 July 2022	MF	(England)	Tyrese Fornah	Nottingham Forest	End of Season	
12 July 2022	MF	(Republic of Ireland)	Jeff Hendrick	Newcastle United	End of Season	
29 July 2022	MF	(Senegal)	Mamadou Loum	Porto	End of Season	
31 August 2022	DF	(Ghana)	Baba Rahman	Chelsea	End of Season	
30 January 2023	MF	(Italy)	Cesare Casadei	Chelsea	End of Season	

=== Out ===
Date	Position	Nationality	Name	To	Fee	Ref.
11 June 2023	DF	(France)	Naby Sarr	Al-Markhiya	Undisclosed	
21 June 2023	FW	(Romania)	George Pușcaș	Genoa	Undisclosed	
27 June 2023	FW	(England)	Tom Ince	Watford	Undisclosed	

=== Loans out ===
Start date	Position	Nationality	Name	To	End date	Ref.
22 July 2022	GK	(Northern Ireland)	Luke Southwood	Cheltenham Town	End of season	
5 August 2022	DF	(England)	Jeriel Dorsett	Kilmarnock	End of season	
25 August 2022	FW	(Romania)	George Pușcaș	Genoa	End of season	
12 September 2022	FW	(England)	Nahum Melvin-Lambert	Hemel Hempstead Town	9 October 2022	
14 September 2022	MF	(England)	Ethan Burnett	Havant & Waterlooville	January 2023	
30 September 2022	MF	(Wales)	Benjamin Purcell	Hartley Wintney	14 December 2022	
30 September 2022	FW	(England)	David Nyarko	Thatcham Town	30 October 2022	
29 October 2022	FW	(Jamaica)	Jahmari Clarke	Woking	29 November 2022	
14 December 2022	MF	(Wales)	Benjamin Purcell	Farnborough	15 February 2023	
24 January 2023	GK	(Iceland)	Jökull Andrésson	Exeter City	31 January 2023	
31 January 2023	GK	(Iceland)	Jökull Andrésson	Stevenage	End of season	
31 January 2023	FW	(Jamaica)	Jahmari Clarke	Forest Green Rovers	End of season	
3 February 2023	FW	(England)	Nahum Melvin-Lambert	Weymouth	3 March 2023	
3 February 2023	FW	(England)	David Nyarko	Weymouth	Work experience	
8 February 2023	MF	(Republic of Ireland)	Kian Leavy	Shelbourne	End of season	
21 February 2023	GK	(England)	Matt Rowley	Bognor Regis Town	23 April 2023	
22 February 2023	MF	(Wales)	Benjamin Purcell	Kingstonian	End of season	
22 February 2023	MF	(England)	Claudio Osorio	Cobh Ramblers	End of season	

=== Released ===
Date	Position	Nationality	Name	Joined	Date	Ref
30 June 2023	GK	(Jamaica)	Coniah Boyce-Clarke	New Contract	10 August 2023	
30 June 2023	GK	(Northern Ireland)	Luke Southwood	Cheltenham Town	11 July 2023	
30 June 2023	DF	(England)	Kyle Daniel-Spray	Thatcham Town	25 September 2023	
30 June 2023	DF	(England)	Scott Dann			
30 June 2023	DF	(England)	Jeriel Dorsett	New Contract	11 July 2023	
30 June 2023	DF	(England)	Zion Nditi	Aldershot Town		
30 June 2023	DF	(Jamaica)	Liam Moore	Northampton Town	13 February 2024	
30 June 2023	MF	(England)	Ethan Burnett	Aldershot Town	1 August 2023	
30 June 2023	MF	(England)	Ryley Campbell	Harrow Borough		
30 June 2023	MF	(England)	Harrison Furlong	North Leigh		
30 June 2023	MF	(England)	Josh Green	Hanley Town		
30 June 2023	MF	(England)	Louis Hutchings	Aldershot Town		
30 June 2023	MF	(England)	Troy Murray	Binfield		
30 June 2023	MF	(England)	Claudio Osorio	Karketu Dili	May 2024	
30 June 2023	MF	(England)	Rashawn Scott	Bishop's Stortford	27 August 2024	
30 June 2023	MF	(Republic of Ireland)	Kian Leavy	St Patrick's Athletic	6 July 2023	
30 June 2023	MF	(Senegal)	Amadou Mbengue	New Contract	19 July 2023	
30 June 2023	MF	(Serbia)	Dejan Tetek	Aldershot Town	20 October 2023	
30 June 2023	FW	(Angola)	Lucas João	Shanghai Port	28 July 2023	
30 June 2023	FW	(Canada)	Junior Hoilett	Vancouver Whitecaps	14 September 2023	
30 June 2023	FW	(England)	Lui Bradbury	CD Almuñécar City	25 August 2023	
30 June 2023	FW	(England)	Aston Greaver	Bedfont Sports		
30 June 2023	FW	(Saint Lucia)	Nahum Melvin-Lambert	Weymouth	11 August 2023	
30 June 2023	FW	(England)	David Nyarko	Harrow Borough		
30 June 2023	FW	(Republic of Ireland)	Shane Long	Retired		
30 June 2023	FW	(Ivory Coast)	Yakou Méïté	Cardiff City	7 July 2023	

=== Trial ===
Date from	Position	Nationality	Name	Last club	Date to	Ref.
June 2022	DF	(England)	Mark Chidi	West Bromwich Albion		
June 2022	MF	(England)	Ethan Burnett	Southampton		
June 2022	MF	(Scotland)	Michael Craig	Tottenham Hotspur	22 June 2022	
June 2022	FW	(England)	Tristan Abldeen-Goodridge	Aston Villa		
1 July 2022	DF	(England)	Sam Hutchinson	Sheffield Wednesday	20 July 2022	
1 July 2022	DF	(England)	Brandon Ormonde-Ottewill	Excelsior		
1 July 2022	DF	(Guinea)	Julian Jeanvier	Brentford	July 2022	
1 July 2022	MF	(Australia)	Massimo Luongo	Sheffield Wednesday	July 2022	
1 July 2022	MF	(England)	Jacob Davenport	Blackburn Rovers	July 2022	
1 July 2022	MF	(England)	Jodi Jones	Coventry City	July 2022	
1 July 2022	MF	(England)	Josh Murphy	Cardiff City	July 2022	
1 July 2022	MF	(England)	Grant Ward	Blackpool	July 2022	
1 July 2022	FW	(England)	Connor Wickham	Milton Keynes Dons	July 2022	
15 July 2022	DF	(England)	Nesta Guinness-Walker	AFC Wimbledon	29 July 2022	
15 July 2022	MF	(England)	Yasin Ben El-Mhanni	Harrow Borough		
August 2022	MF	(Senegal)	Amadou Mbengue	Metz	13 September 2022	
September 2022	DF	(Jamaica)	Michael Hector	Fulham		

== Squad ==
As of match played 8 May 2023

No.	Name	Nationality	Position	Date of birth (age)	Signed from	Signed in	Contract ends	Apps.	Goals
Goalkeepers
1	Joe Lumley	(England)	GK	15 February 1995 (aged 28)	on loan from Middlesbrough	2022	2023	42	0
21	Dean Bouzanis	(Australia)	GK	2 October 1990 (aged 32)	Sutton United	2022	2025	8	0
	Luke Southwood (Note: Luke Southwood was born in Oxford, England, but qualified to represent Northern Ireland, and made his international debut for Northern Ireland in March 2022, having previously played for England at U20 level.)	(Northern Ireland)	GK	6 December 1997 (aged 25)	Academy	2016	2023	30	0
Defenders
3	Tom Holmes	(England)	DF	12 March 2000 (aged 23)	Academy	2017	2025	117	1
4	Sam Hutchinson	(England)	DF	3 August 1989 (aged 33)	Unattached	2022	2024	12	0
5	Tom McIntyre (Note: Tom McIntyre was born in Reading, England, but qualified to represent Scotland, representing them at U17, U20 and U21 level.)	(Scotland)	DF	6 November 1998 (aged 24)	Academy	2016	2024	105	6
6	Scott Dann	(England)	DF	14 February 1987 (aged 36)	Unattached	2021	2023	32	2
12	Baba Rahman	(Ghana)	DF	2 July 1994 (aged 28)	loan from Chelsea	2022	2023	49	0
17	Andy Yiadom (Note: Andy Yiadom was born in Holloway, England, but qualified to represent Ghana and made his international debut for Ghana in January 2017. He previously represented England at C level.)	(Ghana)	DF	2 December 1991 (aged 31)	Barnsley	2018	2025	174	4
18	Nesta Guinness-Walker	(England)	DF	14 September 1999 (aged 23)	Unattached	2022	2024	30	0
24	Naby Sarr	(France)	DF	13 August 1993 (aged 29)	Unattached	2022	2026	25	1
26	Liam Moore (Note: Liam Moore was born in Loughborough, England, but qualified to represent Jamaica, and made his international debut for Jamaica in March 2021.)	(Jamaica)	DF	31 January 1993 (aged 30)	Leicester City	2016	2023	233	8
30	Kelvin Abrefa (Note: Kelvin Abrefa was born in Italy to Ghanaian parents, going on to make his debut for Ghana U20 in June 2022.)	(Ghana)	DF	9 December 2003 (aged 19)	Academy	2020	2024	13	1
Midfielders
8	Jeff Hendrick	(Republic of Ireland)	MF	31 January 1992 (aged 31)	on loan from Newcastle United	2022	2023	46	4
14	Ovie Ejaria	(England)	MF	18 November 1997 (aged 25)	Liverpool	2020	2024	127	9
16	Dejan Tetek (Note: Dejan Tetek was born in Oxford, England to Serbian parents, making his debut for England U18 in 2019, before switching to represent Serbia at U19 in 2022 and U21 in 2021.)	(Serbia)	MF	24 September 2002 (aged 20)	Academy	2019		21	0
19	Tyrese Fornah (Note: Tyrese Fornah was born in Canning Town, England, but qualified to represent Sierra Leone, making his debut for their senior team in 2023.)	(England)	MF	11 September 1999 (aged 23)	on loan from Nottingham Forest	2022	2023	37	2
20	Cesare Casadei	(Italy)	MF	1 October 2003 (aged 19)	on loan from Chelsea	2023	2023	15	1
22	Mamadou Loum	(Senegal)	MF	30 December 1996 (aged 26)	on loan from Porto	2022	2023	32	1
27	Amadou Mbengue (Note: Amadou Mbengue was born in France, but qualified to represent Senegal, going on to make his debut for Senegal U23 in March 2023.)	(Senegal)	MF	5 January 2002 (aged 21)	Unattached	2022	2023	28	2
28	Mamadi Camará	(Guinea-Bissau)	MF	31 December 2003 (aged 19)	Feirense	2020	2023	16	0
36	Michael Craig (Note: Michael Craig was born in Barnet, England, but qualified to represent Scotland, representing them at U16, U17, U19 and U21 level.)	(Scotland)	MF	16 April 2003 (aged 20)	Unattached	2022		5	0
Forwards
2	Andy Carroll	(England)	FW	6 January 1989 (aged 34)	Unattached	2022	2024	40	11
7	Shane Long	(Republic of Ireland)	FW	22 January 1987 (aged 36)	Unattached	2022	2023	235	56
9	Lucas João (Note: Lucas João was born in Lisbon, Portugal, and represented Portugal twice in Friendly matches in 2015, before switching international allegiances to Angola in 2022, making his debut for against Guinea-Bissau in March 2022.)	(Angola)	FW	4 September 1993 (aged 29)	Sheffield Wednesday	2019	2023	119	45
10	Tom Ince	(England)	FW	30 January 1992 (aged 31)	Stoke City	2022	2025	54	11
11	Yakou Méïté (Note: Yakou Méïte was born in Paris, France, but qualified to represent the Ivory Coast, and made his international debut for Ivory Coast in March 2019.)	(Ivory Coast)	FW	11 February 1996 (aged 27)	Paris Saint-Germain	2016	2023	165	47
15	Femi Azeez (Note: Azeez was born in Westminster, England, but qualified to represent Nigeria and made his international debut for Nigeria in May 2026.)	(England)	FW	5 June 2001 (aged 20)	Wealdstone	2019	2024	36	2
23	Junior Hoilett	(Canada)	FW	5 June 1990 (aged 32)	Unattached	2021	2023	62	4
35	Kelvin Ehibhatiomhan	(Nigeria)	FW	23 April 2002 (aged 21)	Academy	2021	2024	10	2
39	Jahmari Clarke (Note: Jahmari Clarke was born in England, but qualified to represent Jamaica, and made his international debut for Jamaica U20 in June 2022.)	(Jamaica)	FW	17 August 2003 (aged 19)	Academy	2020		14	2
U21
25	Jökull Andrésson	(Iceland)	GK	25 August 2001 (aged 21)	Academy	2018	2024	0	0
31	Coniah Boyce-Clarke (Note: Coniah Boyce-Clarke was born in England, but qualified to represent Jamaica, and made his international debut for Jamaica U20 in June 2022.)	(Jamaica)	GK	1 March 2003 (aged 20)	Academy	2019		1	0
32	Nelson Abbey	(England)	DF	28 August 2003 (aged 19)	Academy	2019	2023	5	0
33	John Clarke	(Republic of Ireland)	DF	24 April 2004 (aged 19)	Port Vale	2022		4	0
34	Louie Holzman	(England)	DF	16 November 2003 (aged 19)	Academy	2020	2023	2	0
38	Michael Stickland	(England)	DF	24 August 2002 (aged 20)	Academy	2020	2024	3	0
40	Rashawn Scott	(England)	MF	22 March 2004 (aged 19)	Unattached	2021	2023	1	0
42	Nahum Melvin-Lambert (Note: ahum Melvin-Lambert was born in England, but qualified to represent Saint Lucia, and made his international debut for Saint Lucia in June 2023.)	(Saint Lucia)	FW	21 October 2002 (aged 20)	Academy	2019	2023	3	0
43	Hamid Abdel-Salam	(England)	MF	19 October 2003 (aged 19)	Academy	2020	2024	0	0
44	Sam Paul	(England)	DF	12 January 2004 (aged 19)	Academy	2020	2023	0	0
45	Benjamin Purcell	(Wales)	MF	25 August 2004 (aged 18)	Academy	2020	2023	0	0
46	Jack Senga	(Belgium)	DF	27 January 2004 (aged 19)	Academy	2020	2024	1	0
48	Basil Tuma (Note: Basil Tuma was born in Uganda, but qualified to represent Malta, and made his international debut for Malta U20 in November 2022.)	(Malta)	FW	24 April 2005 (aged 18)	Academy	2021		1	0
	Harvey Collins	(England)	GK	5 November 2002 (aged 20)	Academy	2019	2024	0	0
	Matt Rowley	(England)	GK	12 August 2002 (aged 20)	Academy	2020	2024	0	0
	Kacper Kowalczyk	(Poland)	GK	18 September 2001 (aged 21)	Stal Rzeszów	2022		0	0
	Matthew Carson	(England)	DF	17 October 2002 (aged 20)	Unattached	2023	2023	0	0
	Ayyuba Jambang	(England)	DF	16 October 2004 (aged 18)	Unattached	2022		0	0
	Ethan Burnett	(England)	MF	2 November 2001 (aged 21)	Unattached	2022		0	0
	Josh Green	(England)	MF		Unattached	2022		0	0
	Lewis Hutchings	(England)	MF	22 July 2002 (aged 20)	Academy	2021		0	0
	Adrian Akande	(Nigeria)	FW	22 October 2003 (aged 19)	Unattached	2022	2024	0	0
	Lui Bradbury	(England)	FW	12 July 2004 (aged 18)	Unattached	2022		0	0
	David Nyarko	(England)	FW	7 October 2002 (aged 20)	Academy	2020	2023	0	0
U18
	Tom Norcott	(England)	GK	3 January 2005 (aged 18)	Academy	2021		0	0
	Boyd Beacroft	(England)	DF	22 November 2005 (aged 17)	Academy	2021		0	0
	Kyle Daniel-Spray	(England)	DF	11 December 2004 (aged 18)	Academy	2020		0	0
	Abraham Kanu	(Sierra Leone)	DF	3 July 2005 (aged 17)	Academy	2021		0	0
	Zion Nditi	(England)	DF	13 March 2005 (aged 18)	Academy	2021		0	0
	Jacob Borgnis	(New Zealand)	MF	5 May 2003 (aged 20)	Academy	2021		0	0
	Ryley Campbell	(England)	MF	29 December 2003 (aged 19)	Academy	2021		0	0
	Harrison Furlong	(England)	MF	24 August 2003 (aged 19)	Academy	2021		0	0
	Ajani Giscombe	(England)	MF	12 May 2004 (aged 18)	Academy	2021	2023	0	0
	Troy Murray	(England)	MF	6 November 2002 (aged 20)	Academy	2021		0	0
	Caylan Vickers	(England)	MF	22 December 2004 (aged 18)	Academy	2021		0	0
	Ashton Greaver	(England)	FW	19 August 2004 (aged 18)	Academy	2021		0	0
	Harvey Maudner	(England)	FW	7 October 2003 (aged 19)	Academy	2020	2023	0	0
	Jeremiah Okine-Peters	(England)	FW	16 December 2004 (aged 18)	Academy	2021		0	0
Out on loan
29	Jeriel Dorsett (Note: Jeriel Dorsett was born in Enfield, England, but qualified to represent Montserrat and made his international debut for Montserrat in September 2023. He previously represented England at U18 level.)	(England)	DF	4 May 2002 (aged 21)	Academy	2018	2023	2	0
37	Kian Leavy	(Republic of Ireland)	MF	21 March 2002 (aged 21)	Academy	2018	2023	2	0
41	Claudio Osorio (Note: Claudio Osorio was born in Fatuhada, Timor-Leste, but qualified to represent England, representing them at U15 & U16 level, before switching to represent Timor-Leste in May 2024.)	(England)	MF	26 September 2002 (aged 20)	Academy	2019	2023	2	0
47	George Pușcaș	(Romania)	FW	8 April 1996 (aged 27)	Inter Milan	2019	2024	91	20
Left during the season

== Friendlies ==
2 July 2022	Reading	2–0	Colchester United	Wokingham
13:00 BST (UTC+1)	4' (o.g.); Méïté 17' (pen.)	Report		Stadium: Bearwood Park; Attendance: Behind-closed-doors

9 July 2022	Reading	0–2	Benfica	Burton upon Trent
16:00 BST (UTC+1)		Report	Bah 65'; Dias 72'	Stadium: St George's Park National Football Centre; Attendance: Behind-closed-doors

12 July 2022	Reading	4–0	Maidenhead United	Wokingham
13:00 BST (UTC+1)	Hendrick 40'; Ince 43'; João 45'; Wickham 80' (pen.)	Report		Stadium: Bearwood Park; Attendance: Behind-closed-doors

16 July 2022	Reading	1–1	West Ham United	Reading
15:00 BST (UTC+1)	Méïté 68'	Report	Vlašić 49'	Stadium: Madejski Stadium

19 July 2022	AFC Wimbledon	0–2	Reading	Wimbledon
19:45 BST (UTC+1)		Report	Méïté 35'; Hendrick 74'	Stadium: Plough Lane; Attendance: 1,434

23 July 2022	Reading	1–2	Brighton & Hove Albion	Reading
15:00 BST (UTC+1)	Méïté 59' (pen.)	Report	Groß 19'; March 47'	Stadium: Madejski Stadium

22 September 2022	Brentford	1–1	Reading	Hounslow
BST (UTC+1)	Gilbert	Report	Méïté	Stadium: Jersey Road Training Ground; Attendance: Behind-closed-doors

== Competitions ==
=== Overview ===
Competition	First match	Last match	Starting round	Final position	Record							
Competition	First match	Last match	Starting round	Final position	Pld	W	D	L	GF	GA	GD	Win %
EFL Championship	30 July 2022	May 2023	Matchday 1		46	13	11	22	46	68	−22	28.26
FA Cup	7 January 2023	28 January 2023	Third round	Fourth round	2	1	0	1	3	3	+0	50.00
EFL Cup	9 August 2022	9 August 2022	First round	First round	1	0	0	1	1	2	−1	0.00
Total					49	14	11	24	50	73	−23	28.57

Last updated: 8 May 2023
Source: Competitions

=== Championship ===
On 23 June, the EFL Championship scheduled was released for the season, with Reading starting their season with an away trip to Blackpool on 30 July and ending the season with an away trip to Huddersfield Town on 6 May 2023.

==== League table ====
Pos	Team	Pld	W	D	L	GF	GA	GD	Pts	Promotion, qualification or relegation
19	Rotherham United	46	11	17	18	49	60	−11	50	
20	Queens Park Rangers	46	13	11	22	44	71	−27	50	
21	Cardiff City	46	13	10	23	41	58	−17	49	
22	Reading (R)	46	13	11	22	46	68	−22	44 (Note: Reading were deducted 6 points for breaching an EFL business plan.)	Relegation to League One
23	Blackpool (R)	46	11	11	24	48	72	−24	44	Relegation to League One
24	Wigan Athletic (R)	46	10	15	21	38	65	−27	42 (Note: In March 2023, Wigan Athletic were deducted 3 points for failing to pay players and staff on time.)	Relegation to League One

Source: EFL Official Website
Rules for classification: 1) Points; 2) Goal difference; 3) Number of goals scored; 4) Head-to-head results; 5) Wins; 6) Away goals; 7) Penalty points (sec 9.5); 8) 12-point sending off offences
(R) Relegated

==== Results summary ====
Overall								Home						Away					
Pld	W	D	L	GF	GA	GD	Pts	W	D	L	GF	GA	GD	W	D	L	GF	GA	GD
46	13	11	22	46	68	−22	44	10	8	5	31	24	+7	3	3	17	15	44	−29

Last updated: 8 May 2023.
Source: Results

==== Results by matchday ====
Matchday	1	2	3	4	5	6	7	8	9	10	11	12	13	14	15	16	17	18	19	20	21	22	23	24	25	26	27	28	29	30	31	32	33	34	35	36	37	38	39	40	41	42	43	44	45	46
Ground	A	H	A	H	H	A	A	H	H (Note: matchday 10)	A (Note: matchday 11)	H (Note: matchday 12)	H (Note: matchday 13)	A (Note: matchday 14)	H (Note: matchday 15)	A (Note: matchday 16)	H (Note: matchday 17)	A (Note: matchday 18)	A (Note: matchday 19)	H (Note: matchday 20)	A (Note: matchday 9)	A	H	A	H	A	A	H	A	H	A	H	A	H	A	H	H	A	H	A	H (Note: Between matchday 39 and 40, Reading were deducted 6 points.)	A	H	H	A	H	A
Result	L	W	L	W	W	W	L	W	L	W	W	D	L	L	L	W	L	D	L	L	W	W	L	W	D	L	D	L	D	L	W	L	W	L	L	L	L	D	D	D	L	D	D	L	D	L
Position	23	10	18	8	3	1	5	3	4	3	3	3	5	6	9	8	11	11	12	13	12	8	12	8	10	13	14	16	16	18	15	16	14	15	15	16	16	18	18	22	22	22	22	22	22	22

Updated to match(es) played on 8 May 2023. Source: Results
A = Away; H = Home; W = Win; D = Draw; L = Loss; P = Postponed

==== Results ====
30 July 2022 1	Blackpool	1–0	Reading	Blackpool
15:00 BST (UTC+1)	Connolly 10'; Dougall (yellow card) 80'	Report		Stadium: Bloomfield Road; Attendance: 10,831; Referee: David Webb

6 August 2022 2	Reading	2–1	Cardiff City	Reading
15:00 BST (UTC+1)	Hoilett (yellow card) 20'; Long 27' (pen.); Ince 63'; Abrefa (yellow card) 86'; Yiadom (yellow card) 90'	Report	O'Dowda 4'; Nelson (yellow card) 25'; Collins (yellow card) 65'; Harris (yellow card) 90'	Stadium: Madejski Stadium; Attendance: 13,866; Referee: Darren England

13 August 2022 3	Rotherham United	4–0	Reading	Rotherham
15:00 BST (UTC+1)	Wood 7'; Washington 15'; Lindsay 18'; Ogbene 45+2'	Report	Yiadom (yellow card) 57'; Long (yellow card) 85'	Stadium: New York Stadium; Attendance: 9,263; Referee: Steve Martin

17 August 2022 4	Reading	3–0	Blackburn Rovers	Reading
20:00 BST (UTC+1)	McIntyre 14'; Fornah (yellow card) 53'; Holmes (yellow card) 55'; Hoilett 61'; Guinness-Walker (yellow card) 63'; João 78'; Lumley (yellow card) 87'; Loum (yellow card) 90+6'	Report	Pickering (yellow card) 12'; Ayala (yellow card) 55'	Stadium: Madejski Stadium; Attendance: 11,780; Referee: Keith Stroud

20 August 2022 5	Reading	1–0	Middlesbrough	Reading
15:00 BST (UTC+1)	Fornah 28'; Hoilett (yellow card) 41'; McIntyre (yellow card) 75'; Bouzanis (yellow card) 85'; Loum (yellow card) 90+2'	Report	Jones (yellow card) 22'	Stadium: Madejski Stadium; Attendance: 12,318; Referee: James Linington

27 August 2022 6	Millwall	0–1	Reading	London
15:00 BST (UTC+1)		Report	Sarr 14'; Holmes (yellow card) 82'	Stadium: The Den; Attendance: 14,352; Referee: Chris Kavanagh

30 August 2022 7	Sheffield United	4–0	Reading	Sheffield
19:45 BST (UTC+1)	McBurnie 11'; Ahmedhodžić 46', 81'; Ndiaye 62'	Report		Stadium: Bramall Lane; Attendance: 27,810; Referee: Gavin Ward

4 September 2022 8	Reading	2–1	Stoke City	Reading
12:00 BST (UTC+1)	João 2', 57' (pen.); Hutchinson (yellow card) 6'; Lumley (yellow card) 90'	Report	Wilmot 40'	Stadium: Madejski Stadium; Attendance: 12,292; Referee: David Coote

14 September 2022 10	Reading	0–3	Sunderland	Reading
20:00 BST (UTC+1)	Yiadom (yellow card) 71'	Report	Roberts 39', 41'; Alese (yellow card) 62'; Clarke 69'	Stadium: Madejski Stadium; Attendance: 12,061; Referee: Matt Donohue

17 September 2022 11	Wigan Athletic	0–1	Reading	Wigan
15:00 BST (UTC+1)	Shinnie (yellow card) 36'; Wyke (yellow card) 83'; Naylor (yellow card) 87'	Report	Ince 63'; Rahman (yellow card) 67'; Yiadom (yellow card) 90+1'	Stadium: DW Stadium; Attendance: 10,113; Referee: David Webb

1 October 2022 12	Reading	3–1	Huddersfield Town	Reading
15:00 BST (UTC+1)	McIntyre 29'; Nicholls 36' (o.g.); Méïté 81'	Report	Thomas (yellow card) 41'; Kasumu (yellow card) 49'; Mahoney (yellow card) 74'; Lees 90+4'	Stadium: Madejski Stadium; Attendance: 16,684; Referee: Oliver Langford

4 October 2022 13	Reading	1–1	Norwich City	Reading
20:00 BST (UTC+1)	Hutchinson (yellow card) 11'; Ince (yellow card) 24'; Hendrick 60'; Hoilett (yellow card) 86'	Report	Hanley 50'; Omobamidele (yellow card) 83'	Stadium: Madejski Stadium; Attendance: 11,978; Referee: Darren Bond

7 October 2022 14	Queens Park Rangers	2–1	Reading	White City
19:45 BST (UTC+1)	Dykes 33', 84' (pen.); Iroegbunam (yellow card) 53'; Amos (yellow card) 90+4'	Report	Hutchinson (yellow card) 25'; Carroll 30' (pen.) (yellow card) 45'; Holmes (yellow card) 83'	Stadium: Loftus Road; Attendance: 16,656; Referee: Thomas Bramall

15 October 2022 15	Reading	0–2	West Bromwich Albion	Reading
15:00 BST (UTC+1)	Ince (yellow card) 16'; Loum (yellow card) 34'; McIntyre (yellow card) 49'	Report	Phillips 25' (yellow card) 60'; Gardner-Hickman 72'	Stadium: Madejski Stadium; Attendance: 14,235; Referee: Tim Robinson

18 October 2022 16	Swansea City	3–2	Reading	Swansea
19:45 BST (UTC+1)	Darling 41'; Cooper 60'; Latibeaudiere (yellow card) 65'; Fulton 74'	Report	Méïté 26'; Ince 33'; Yiadom (yellow card) 45'	Stadium: Swansea.com Stadium; Attendance: 15,717; Referee: Andy Davies

22 October 2022 17	Reading	2–0	Bristol City	Reading
15:00 BST (UTC+1)	Loum 52' (yellow card) 90+1'; Rahman (yellow card) 78'; Carroll 90+4'	Report	Conway (yellow card) 65'; Pring (yellow card) 76'; Martin (yellow card) 90'	Stadium: Madejski Stadium; Attendance: 13,606; Referee: John Busby

29 October 2022 18	Burnley	2–1	Reading	Burnley
15:00 BST (UTC+1)	Harwood-Bellis (yellow card) 22'; Benson 66' (yellow card) 90+6'; Zaroury 90+4'; Muric (yellow card) 90+9'	Report	Rahman (yellow card) 35'; Ince 56' (yellow card) 90+8'; Holmes (yellow card) 59'; Loum (yellow card) 72'	Stadium: Turf Moor; Attendance: 18,684; Referee: Jeremy Simpson

1 November 2022 19	Luton Town	0–0	Reading	Luton
19:45 GMT (UTC)	Campbell (yellow card) 24'; Doughty (yellow card) 70'	Report	Méïté (yellow card) 70'; Yiadom (yellow card) 86'; Carroll (yellow card) 87'	Stadium: Kenilworth Road; Attendance: 9,620; Referee: John Brooks

4 November 2022 20	Reading	1–2	Preston North End	Reading
20:00 GMT (UTC)	Loum (yellow card) 56'; João 71' (pen.)	Report	Brady (yellow card) 23'; Evans 51', 79' (yellow card) 80'; Ledson (yellow card) 77'; Potts (yellow card) 90+5'	Stadium: Madejski Stadium; Attendance: 11,777; Referee: David Webb

8 November 2022 9	Watford	2–0	Reading	Watford
20:00 GMT (UTC)	Pedro 15' (pen.), 87'; Asprilla (yellow card) 34'; Sema (yellow card) 49'	Report	Ejaria (yellow card) 38'; Rahman (yellow card) 73'; Loum (yellow card) 78'	Stadium: Vicarage Road; Attendance: 18,847; Referee: James Linington
Note: Match originally scheduled for 10 September, but postponed on 9 September as a mark of respect following the death of Elizabeth II and rearranged on 12 September for 8 November.

12 November 2022 21	Hull City	1–2	Reading	Kingston upon Hull
15:00 GMT (UTC)	Greaves 9'	Report	Méïté 32'; Hendrick (yellow card) 40'; Longman 90+4' (o.g.)	Stadium: MKM Stadium; Attendance: 15,997; Referee: Gavin Ward

10 December 2022 22	Reading	1–0	Coventry City	Reading
14:00 GMT (UTC)	Hendrick (yellow card) 45+4'; Mbengue 57' (yellow card) 90'	Report	Doyle (yellow card) 29'; Allen (yellow card) 63'; Eccles (yellow card) 75'	Stadium: Madejski Stadium; Attendance: 15,213; Referee: Matt Donohue
Note: Match originally scheduled to kick off at 15:00, but brought forward due to England’s progression to the Quarter-Finals of the 2022 FIFA World Cup.

16 December 2022 23	Birmingham City	3–2	Reading	Birmingham
20:00 GMT (UTC)	Deeney 2', 23' (pen.); Chong 36'; Bielik (yellow card) 44'	Report	João 83'; Ince 90+4'; Yiadom (yellow card) 90+7'	Stadium: St Andrew's; Attendance: 14,647; Referee: Tim Robinson

27 December 2022 24	Reading	2–1	Swansea City	Reading
17:15 GMT (UTC)	Carroll 27'; Méïté (penalty missed) 32'; Holmes (yellow card) 40'; Ince 53'; Loum (yellow card) 77'	Report	Cooper (yellow card) 27'; Cabango (yellow card) 66'; Darling (yellow card) 66'; Cullen 71'	Stadium: Madejski Stadium; Attendance: 15,452; Referee: James Linington

30 December 2022 25	Norwich City	1–1	Reading	Norwich
19:45 GMT (UTC)	Hanley (yellow card) 1'; McCallum (yellow card) 31'; Idah 53'; Sara (yellow card) 79'	Report	Holmes (yellow card) 59'; Loum (yellow card) 77'; Carroll 83' (pen.)	Stadium: Carrow Road; Attendance: 26,218; Referee: David Webb

2 January 2023 26	West Bromwich Albion	1–0	Reading	West Bromwich
15:00 GMT (UTC)	Dike 60'; Rogic (yellow card) 76'	Report	McIntyre (yellow card) 47'; Hoilett (yellow card) 51'; Lumley (yellow card) 56'; Mbengue (yellow card) 75'	Stadium: The Hawthorns; Attendance: 25,322; Referee: Tom Nield

14 January 2023 27	Reading	2–2	Queens Park Rangers	Reading
15:00 GMT (UTC)	Hendrick 28', 42'; Rahman (yellow card) 41'; Yiadom (yellow card) 72'	Report	Dickie (yellow card) 27'; Roberts 65', 80'; Richards (yellow card) 87'	Stadium: Madejski Stadium; Attendance: 14,186; Referee: Darren Bond

21 January 2023 28	Stoke City	4–0	Reading	Stoke-on-Trent
15:00 GMT (UTC)	Smallbone 11'; Campbell 57'; Brown 80'; Gayle 83'	Report		Stadium: Bet365 Stadium; Attendance: 19,157; Referee: Gavin Ward

4 February 2023 30	Reading	2–2	Watford	Reading
15:00 GMT (UTC)	Mbengue (yellow card) 32'; Ince 66' (pen.); Hendrick 80'; Holmes (yellow card) 84'; Loum (yellow card) 87'	Report	Sarr 30'; Porteous 48'; Martins (yellow card) 64'; Kamara (yellow card) 76'; João Pedro (yellow card) 90+4'; Choudhury (yellow card) 90+5'	Stadium: Madejski Stadium; Attendance: 13,861; Referee: Steve Martin

11 February 2023 31	Sunderland	1–0	Reading	Sunderland
15:00 GMT (UTC)	Roberts 84'	Report	Yiadom (yellow card) 33'; Méïté (yellow card) 90+2'	Stadium: Stadium of Light; Attendance: 38,046; Referee: David Coote

14 February 2023 32	Reading	2–1	Rotherham United	Reading
20:00 GMT (UTC)	Carroll 52' (yellow card) 90+6'; Yiadom (yellow card) 60'; Fornah 90'	Report	Peltier 37'	Stadium: Madejski Stadium; Attendance: 9,492; Referee: John Busby

17 February 2023 33	Cardiff City	1–0	Reading	Cardiff
20:00 GMT (UTC)	McGuinness (yellow card) 38'; Sawyers 90+1'	Report	Dann (yellow card) 27'; Loum (yellow card) 76'	Stadium: Cardiff City Stadium; Attendance: 18,879; Referee: Darren Bond

25 February 2023 34	Reading	3–1	Blackpool	Reading
15:00 GMT (UTC)	Ince 12', 72'; Mbengue (yellow card) 57'; Carroll 70' (pen.)	Report	Carey 90+4'	Stadium: Madejski Stadium; Attendance: 17,013; Referee: John Brooks

4 March 2023 35	Middlesbrough	5–0	Reading	Middlesbrough
15:00 GMT (UTC)	Akpom 24', 48' (pen.) (yellow card) 32'; Ramsey 45+1', 51'; Forss 76' (pen.)	Report	Ince (yellow card) 26'; Holmes (yellow card) 78'	Stadium: Riverside Stadium; Attendance: 26,823; Referee: Keith Stroud

7 March 2023 29	Reading	0–1	Sheffield United	Reading
20:00 GMT (UTC)	Yiadom (yellow card) 40'; Ince (yellow card) 45+2'	Report	Ndiaye 60'	Stadium: Madejski Stadium; Attendance: 9,897; Referee: Dean Whitestone

11 March 2023 36	Reading	0–1	Millwall	Reading
15:00 GMT (UTC)	Ince (yellow card) 86'	Report	Voglsammer 11' (pen.)	Stadium: Madejski Stadium; Attendance: 13,265; Referee: Michael Salisbury

15 March 2023 37	Blackburn Rovers	2–1	Reading	Blackburn
19:45 GMT (UTC)	Brereton Díaz 2'; Rankin-Costello (yellow card) 28'; Hedges 82'; Gallagher (yellow card) 85'	Report	Casadei 68'; Loum (red card) 85'; Lumley (yellow card) 85'; Ehibhatiomhan (yellow card) 89'	Stadium: Ewood Park; Attendance: 14,023; Referee: Darren Bond

18 March 2023 38	Reading	1–1	Hull City	Reading
15:00 GMT (UTC)	Carroll 44' (yellow card) 67'; Yiadom (yellow card) 70'	Report	Slater 26'; Jones (yellow card) 90+3'	Stadium: Madejski Stadium; Attendance: 12,033; Referee: Gavin Ward

1 April 2023 39	Bristol City	1–1	Reading	Bristol
15:00 BST (UTC+1)	Taylor-Clarke (yellow card) 23'; Conway 45+2'; Mehmeti (yellow card) 65'; James (yellow card) 71'	Report	Holmes (yellow card) 4'; João 72'; Yiadom (yellow card) 76'	Stadium: Ashton Gate Stadium; Attendance: 20,526; Referee: Stephen Martin

7 April 2023 40	Reading	1–1	Birmingham City	Reading
15:00 BST (UTC+1)	Carroll 7'; Fornah (yellow card) 58'	Report	Jutkiewicz 29'; Bielik (yellow card) 72'	Stadium: Madejski Stadium; Attendance: 16,084; Referee: Scott Oldham

10 April 2023 41	Preston North End	2–1	Reading	Preston
15:00 BST (UTC+1)	Cannon 56'; Potts 90+2' (yellow card) 90+2'	Report	Sarr (yellow card) 50'; Dann (yellow card) 64'; Ehibhatiomhan 83'	Stadium: Deepdale; Attendance: 15,092; Referee: John Busby

15 April 2023 42	Reading	0–0	Burnley	Reading
15:00 BST (UTC+1)	Carroll (yellow card) 77'; Mbengue (yellow card) 79'; Lumley (yellow card) 90+4'	Report	Cork (yellow card) 89'	Stadium: Madejski Stadium; Attendance: 19,476; Referee: Oliver Langford

19 April 2023 42	Reading	1–1	Luton Town	Reading
20:00 BST (UTC+1)	Carroll (yellow card) 15' (yellow-red card) 56', (goal) 51'; Hendrick (yellow card) 34'; Lumley (yellow card) 79'; Holmes (yellow card) 89'	Report	Doughty (yellow card) 60'; Morris 81'; Drameh (yellow card) 88'	Stadium: Madejski Stadium; Attendance: 14,126; Referee: Tim Robinson

22 April 2023 44	Coventry City	2–1	Reading	Coventry
15:00 BST (UTC+1)	Godden 36'; Hamer 54' (yellow card) 81'; Wilson-Esbrand (yellow card) 61'; Eccles (yellow card) 87'; Norton-Cuffy (yellow card) 90+7'	Report	Holmes (yellow card) 12'; Guinness-Walker (yellow card) 43'; João 51'; Yiadom (yellow card) 56'; Fornah (yellow card) 90+7'	Stadium: Coventry Building Society Arena; Attendance: 23,694; Referee: Matt Donohue

29 April 2023 45	Reading	1–1	Wigan Athletic	Reading
15:00 BST (UTC+1)	Casadei (yellow card) 80'; Méïté 90+3' (yellow card) 90+7'	Report	Hughes 81'; Power (yellow card) 90'	Stadium: Madejski Stadium; Attendance: 21,919; Referee: Andy Davies

8 May 2023 46	Huddersfield Town	2–0	Reading	Huddersfield
15:00 BST (UTC+1)	Koroma 49'; Hungbo 84'	Report	Sarr (yellow card) 59'	Stadium: Kirklees Stadium; Attendance: 21,585; Referee: Josh Smith

=== EFL Cup ===
9 August 2022 First round	Reading	1–2	Stevenage	Reading
20:00 BST (UTC+1)	Abrefa (yellow card) 42'; Ehibhatiomhan 63' (yellow card) 90+1'	Report	Earley 10' (yellow card) 38'; Campbell (yellow card) 58'; Rose 89'	Stadium: Madejski Stadium; Attendance: 4,230; Referee: Carl Brook

=== FA Cup ===
7 January 2023 Third round	Reading	2–0	Watford	Reading
12:30 GMT (UTC)	Hutchinson (yellow card) 13'; Abrefa 45+3'; Mbengue (yellow card) 69'; Long 90+3'	Report	Morris (yellow card) 59'; Adu-Poku (yellow card) 86'	Stadium: Madejski Stadium; Attendance: 7,954; Referee: Peter Bankes

28 January 2023 Fourth round	Manchester United	3–1	Reading	Trafford
20:00 GMT (UTC)	Casemiro 54', 58'; Fred 66'; Malacia (yellow card) 78'	Report	Carroll (yellow card) 60' (yellow-red card) 65'; Mbengue 72'	Stadium: Old Trafford; Attendance: 73,460; Referee: Darren England

== Squad statistics ==
As of match played 8 May 2023

=== Appearances and goals ===
No.	Pos	Nat	Player	Total		Championship		FA Cup		League Cup	
No.	Pos	Nat	Player	Apps	Goals	Apps	Goals	Apps	Goals	Apps	Goals
1	GK	(England) ENG	Joe Lumley	42	0	41	0	1	0	0	0
2	FW	(England) ENG	Andy Carroll	32	9	23+7	9	1+1	0	0	0
3	DF	(England) ENG	Tom Holmes	42	0	39+1	0	1	0	1	0
4	DF	(England) ENG	Sam Hutchinson	12	0	11	0	1	0	0	0
5	DF	(Scotland) SCO	Tom McIntyre	41	2	35+3	2	2	0	0+1	0
6	DF	(England) ENG	Scott Dann	14	0	6+7	0	1	0	0	0
7	FW	(Republic of Ireland) IRL	Shane Long	32	2	16+14	1	1+1	1	0	0
8	MF	(Republic of Ireland) IRL	Jeff Hendrick	46	4	45	4	1	0	0	0
9	FW	(Angola) ANG	Lucas João	36	7	19+15	7	2	0	0	0
10	FW	(England) ENG	Tom Ince	39	9	36+2	9	1	0	0	0
11	FW	(Ivory Coast) CIV	Yakou Méïté	27	4	16+11	4	0	0	0	0
12	DF	(Ghana) GHA	Baba Rahman	20	0	13+5	0	2	0	0	0
14	MF	(England) ENG	Ovie Ejaria	8	0	5+3	0	0	0	0	0
15	FW	(England) ENG	Femi Azeez	21	0	5+15	0	1	0	0	0
17	DF	(Ghana) GHA	Andy Yiadom	42	0	41	0	1	0	0	0
18	DF	(England) ENG	Nesta Guinness-Walker	30	0	18+10	0	0+1	0	1	0
19	MF	(England) ENG	Tyrese Fornah	37	2	21+14	2	0+1	0	1	0
20	MF	(Italy) ITA	Cesare Casadei	15	1	13+2	1	0	0	0	0
21	GK	(Australia) AUS	Dean Bouzanis	8	0	4+1	0	1+1	0	1	0
22	MF	(Senegal) SEN	Mamadou Loum	32	1	23+6	1	1+1	0	1	0
23	FW	(Canada) CAN	Junior Hoilett	35	1	30+4	1	1	0	0	0
24	DF	(France) FRA	Naby Sarr	25	1	23+1	1	1	0	0	0
26	DF	(Jamaica) JAM	Liam Moore	3	0	1+2	0	0	0	0	0
27	MF	(Senegal) SEN	Amadou Mbengue	28	2	18+8	1	1+1	1	0	0
28	MF	(Guinea-Bissau) GBS	Mamadi Camará	6	0	1+4	0	0	0	0+1	0
30	DF	(Ghana) GHA	Kelvin Abrefa	10	1	0+8	0	1	1	1	0
31	GK	(Jamaica) JAM	Coniah Boyce-Clarke	1	0	1	0	0	0	0	0
32	DF	(England) ENG	Nelson Abbey	3	0	0+3	0	0	0	0	0
33	DF	(Republic of Ireland) IRL	John Clarke	4	0	0+3	0	0	0	1	0
34	DF	(England) ENG	Louie Holzman	1	0	0	0	0	0	1	0
35	FW	(Nigeria) NGR	Kelvin Ehibhatiomhan	9	2	2+6	1	0	0	1	1
36	MF	(Scotland) SCO	Michael Craig	5	0	0+2	0	0+2	0	0+1	0
46	DF	(Belgium) BEL	Jack Senga	1	0	0+1	0	0	0	0	0
48	FW	(Malta) MLT	Basil Tuma	1	0	0	0	0	0	1	0
Players away on loan:
37	MF	(Republic of Ireland) IRL	Kian Leavy	1	0	0	0	0	0	1	0
39	FW	(Jamaica) JAM	Jahmari Clarke	1	0	0	0	0	0	0+1	0
Players who appeared for Reading but left during the season:

=== Goal scorers ===
Place	Position	Nation	Number	Name	Championship	FA Cup	League Cup	Total
1	FW	(England)	10	Tom Ince	9	0	0	9
1	FW	(England)	2	Andy Carroll	9	0	0	9
3	FW	(Angola)	9	Lucas João	7	0	0	7
4	MF	(Republic of Ireland)	8	Jeff Hendrick	4	0	0	4
4	FW	(Ivory Coast)	11	Yakou Méïté	4	0	0	4
6	DF	(Scotland)	5	Tom McIntyre	2	0	0	2
6	MF	(England)	19	Tyrese Fornah	2	0	0	2
6	FW	(Republic of Ireland)	7	Shane Long	1	1	0	2
6	MF	(Senegal)	27	Amadou Mbengue	1	1	0	2
6	FW	(Nigeria)	35	Kelvin Ehibhatiomhan	1	0	1	2
6				Own goal	2	0	0	2
12	FW	(Canada)	23	Junior Hoilett	1	0	0	1
12	DF	(France)	24	Naby Sarr	1	0	0	1
12	MF	(Senegal)	22	Mamadou Loum	1	0	0	1
12	MF	(Italy)	20	Cesare Casadei	1	0	0	1
12	DF	(Ghana)	30	Kelvin Abrefa	0	1	0	1
Total					46	3	1	50

=== Clean sheets ===
Place	Position	Nation	Number	Name	Championship	FA Cup	League Cup	Total
1	GK	(England)	1	Joe Lumley	7	0	0	7
2	GK	(Australia)	21	Dean Bouzanis	1	1	0	2
TOTALS					8	1	0	9

=== Disciplinary record ===
Number	Nation	Position	Name	Championship		FA Cup		League Cup		Total	
Number	Nation	Position	Name	Booked	Sent off (straight red)	Booked	Sent off (straight red)	Booked	Sent off (straight red)	Booked	Sent off (straight red)
1	(England)	GK	Joe Lumley	6	0	0	0	0	0	6	0
2	(England)	FW	Andy Carroll	7	2	2	1	0	0	9	2
3	(England)	DF	Tom Holmes	11	0	0	0	0	0	11	0
4	(England)	DF	Sam Hutchinson	3	0	1	0	0	0	4	0
5	(Scotland)	DF	Tom McIntyre	3	0	0	0	0	0	3	0
6	(England)	DF	Scott Dann	2	0	0	0	0	0	2	0
7	(Republic of Ireland)	FW	Shane Long	1	0	0	0	0	0	1	0
8	(Republic of Ireland)	MF	Jeff Hendrick	3	0	0	0	0	0	3	0
10	(England)	FW	Tom Ince	6	0	0	0	0	0	6	0
11	(Ivory Coast)	FW	Yakou Méïté	3	0	0	0	0	0	3	0
12	(Ghana)	DF	Baba Rahman	5	0	0	0	0	0	5	0
14	(England)	MF	Ovie Ejaria	1	0	0	0	0	0	1	0
17	(Ghana)	DF	Andy Yiadom	14	0	0	0	0	0	14	0
18	(England)	DF	Nesta Guinness-Walker	2	0	0	0	0	0	2	0
19	(England)	MF	Tyrese Fornah	3	0	0	0	0	0	3	0
20	(Italy)	MF	Cesare Casadei	1	0	0	0	0	0	1	0
21	(Australia)	GK	Dean Bouzanis	1	0	0	0	0	0	1	0
22	(Senegal)	MF	Mamadou Loum	11	1	0	0	0	0	11	1
23	(Canada)	FW	Junior Hoilett	4	0	0	0	0	0	4	0
24	(France)	DF	Naby Sarr	2	0	0	0	0	0	2	0
27	(Senegal)	MF	Amadou Mbengue	5	0	1	0	0	0	6	0
30	(Ghana)	DF	Kelvin Abrefa	1	0	0	0	1	0	2	0
35	(Nigeria)	FW	Kelvin Ehibhatiomhan	1	0	0	0	1	0	2	0
Players away on loan:
Players who left Reading during the season:
Total				96	2	4	1	2	0	102	3
