= Yakou Méïté =

Ivorian footballer (born 1996)

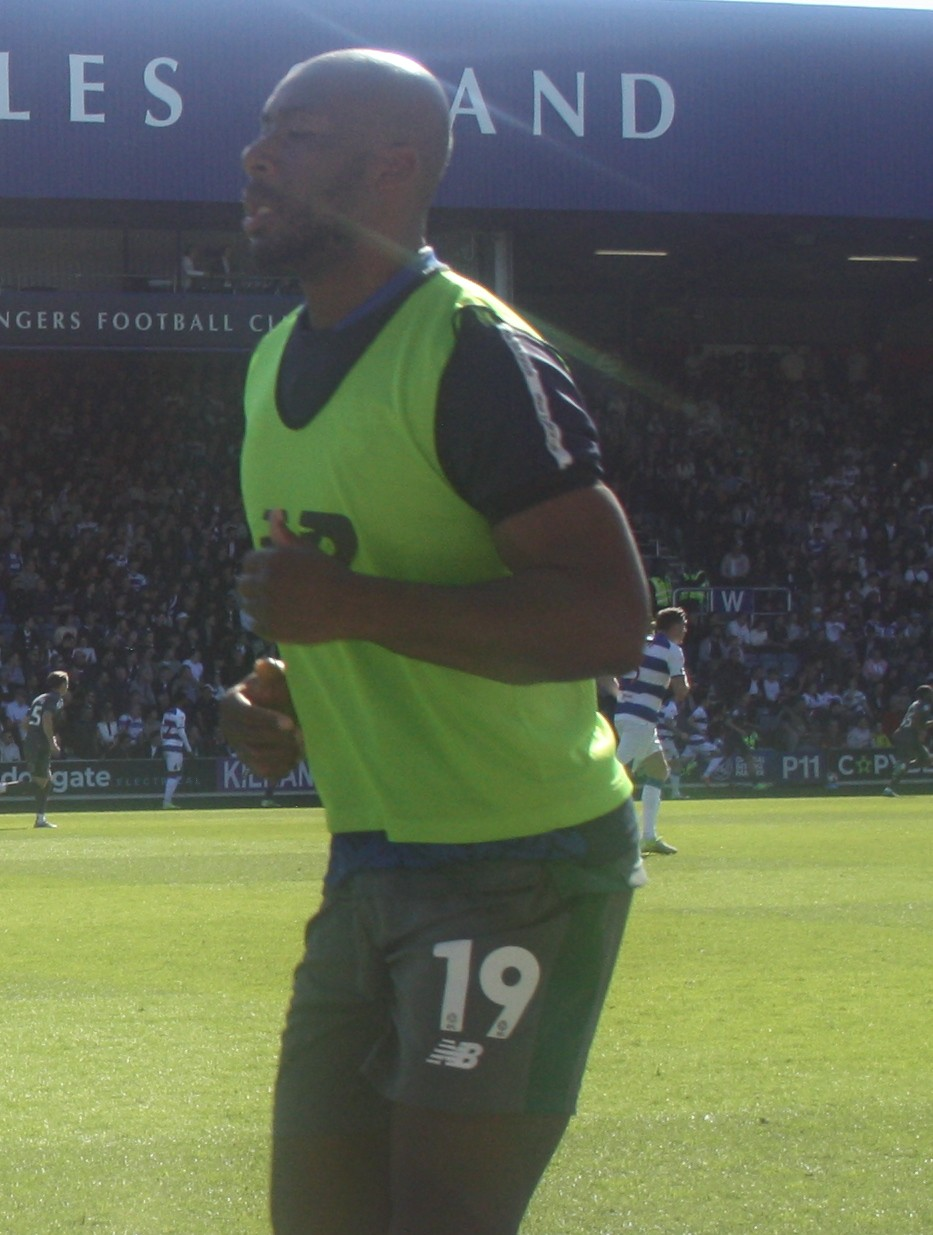
- Méïté in 2025.

Personal information
- Full name: Yakou Méïté
- Date of birth: 11 February 1996 (age 30)
- Place of birth: Paris, France
- Height: 1.85 m (6 ft 1 in)
- Positions: Striker; winger

Team information
- Current team: Damac
- Number: 11

Youth career
- 2009–2014: Paris Saint-Germain

Senior career*
Years	Team	Apps	(Gls)
2013–2016	Paris Saint-Germain B	45	(8)
2015–2016	Paris Saint-Germain	1	(0)
2016–2023	Reading	156	(42)
2017–2018	→ Sochaux (loan)	31	(3)
2023–2025	Cardiff City	72	(5)
2025–	Damac	30	(10)

International career^{‡}
2013	Ivory Coast U17	5	(1)
2015	Ivory Coast U20	4	(0)
2017	Ivory Coast U23	1	(0)
2018–	Ivory Coast	2	(0)
- * Club domestic league appearances and goals as of 20 October 2026 (UTC) ‡ National team caps and goals as of 13 October 2019

Yakou Méïté (born 11 February 1996) is a professional footballer who plays as a striker for Damac. Born in France, he represents the Ivory Coast at international level.

== Early life ==
Méïté was born and raised in France to Ivorian parents.

== Club career ==
=== Paris Saint Germain ===
Méïté started his professional career at Paris Saint-Germain. He made his professional debut on 9 April 2016, in a Ligue 1 match against Guingamp, replacing Jean-Kévin Augustin after 91 minutes, in a 2–0 away win.

=== Reading ===
On 29 July 2016, Méïté signed a three-year contract with English side Reading. He made his debut for Reading as a substitute in an EFL Cup tie against Plymouth Argyle on 9 August 2016, with his first goal for the club coming on 21 January 2017, during a 3–2 defeat to Derby County in the Championship.

On 8 July 2017, Méïté moved to Sochaux, on a season-long loan deal.

On 3 October 2018, Reading announced that Méïté had signed a new contract with Reading, until the summer of 2022. On his return to Reading, he became a mainstay as the club's striker and scored 6 goals in 5 games, impressing manager Paul Clement.

In August 2019, Méïté spoke out about racist abuse he received on social media. He said he chose to do so due to the impact it had on players. On 4 July 2020, he scored four goals in a 5–0 win away at Luton Town.

On 17 May 2023, Reading announced that they had offered a new contract to Méïté, with his current deal due to expire at the end of June 2023. On 21 June 2023, Méïté confirmed his decision to leave Reading at the end of his contract.

=== Cardiff City ===
On 7 July 2023, Méïté signed a two-year contract with Cardiff City. On 12 June 2025, Cardiff announced that Méïté would leave the club at the end of his contract.

=== Damac ===
On 27 August 2025, Saudi Pro League club Damac announced the signing of Méïté.

== International career ==
Méïté has represented the Ivory Coast U17s and U20s. He debuted for the Ivory Coast U23s in a 5–0 friendly win over the Togo U23s on 27 March 2018.

Méïté was called up to the senior Ivory Coast squad for a friendly against Togo in March 2018. He was selected for the 2019 Africa Cup of Nations qualifying match against Guinea on 18 November 2018. He made his debut for the Ivory Coast on 26 March 2019, in a 1–0 victory over Liberia, playing 73 minutes before being replaced by eventual goalscorer Jonathan Kodjia.

== Style of play ==
Méïté is a physically strong player. He has impressive strength, ability in the air, speed and tireless stamina. Paul Clement praised him for his workrate and willingness to battle for every ball.

== Personal life ==
Yakou Meïté is the cousin of Bamo Meïté, who is also a professional footballer.

== Career statistics ==
=== Club ===
As of match played 19 October 2026

Appearances and goals by club, season and competition
Club	Season	League			National cup (Note: Includes Coupe de France, FA Cup)		League cup (Note: Includes Coupe de la Ligue, EFL Cup)		Continental		Other		Total	
Club	Season	Division	Apps	Goals	Apps	Goals	Apps	Goals	Apps	Goals	Apps	Goals	Apps	Goals
Paris Saint-Germain B	2013–14	CFA	1	0	—		—		—		—		1	0
Paris Saint-Germain B	2014–15	CFA	20	6	—		—		—		—		20	6
Paris Saint-Germain B	2015–16	CFA	24	2	—		—		—		—		24	2
Paris Saint-Germain B	Total		45	8	0	0	0	0	0	0	0	0	45	8
Paris Saint-Germain	2015–16	Ligue 1	1	0	0	0	0	0	0	0	0	0	1	0
Reading	2016–17	Championship	14	1	0	0	1	0	—		0	0	15	1
Reading	2018–19	Championship	37	12	1	0	2	1	—		—		40	13
Reading	2019–20	Championship	40	13	3	2	2	2	—		—		45	17
Reading	2020–21	Championship	25	12	0	0	0	0	—		—		25	12
Reading	2021–22	Championship	13	0	0	0	0	0	—		—		13	0
Reading	2022–23	Championship	27	4	0	0	0	0	—		—		27	4
Reading	Total		156	42	4	2	5	3	0	0	0	0	165	47
Reading U21	2016–17	—			—		—		—		1 (Note: Appearance in EFL Trophy)	0	1	0
Sochaux (loan)	2017–18	Ligue 2	31	3	3	2	1	0	—		—		35	5
Cardiff City	2023–24	Championship	38	2	0	0	0	0	—		—		38	2
Cardiff City	2024–25	Championship	34	3	0	0	0	0	—		—		34	3
Cardiff City	Total		72	5	0	0	0	0	0	0	0	0	72	5
Damac	2025–26	Saudi Pro League	20	5	0	0	—		—		—		20	5
Damac	2026–27	Saudi First Division League	10	5	0	0	—		—		—		10	5
Damac	Total		30	10	0	0	0	0	0	0	0	0	30	10
Career total			334	68	7	4	6	3	0	0	1	0	349	75

=== International ===
As of match played 13 October 2019

Ivory Coast
Year	Apps	Goals
2018	1	0
2019	1	0
Total	2	0

== Honours ==
Paris Saint-Germain U19

- Championnat National U19: 2015–16
- UEFA Youth League runner-up: 2015–16

Paris Saint-Germain

- Ligue 1: 2015–16
