= Coniah Boyce-Clarke =

Jamaican footballer (born 2003)

Personal information
- Full name: Coniah Chronicles Boyce-Clarke
- Date of birth: 1 March 2003 (age 23)
- Place of birth: Reading, England
- Height: 1.83 m (6 ft 0 in)
- Position: Goalkeeper

Team information
- Current team: Tranmere Rovers
- Number: 13

Senior career*
| Years | Team | Apps | (Gls) |
| 2020–2025 | Reading | 2 | (0) |
| 2021 | → St Albans City (loan) | 3 | (0) |
| 2022 | → Welling United (loan) | 8 | (0) |
| 2025–2026 | Aldershot Town | 25 | (0) |
| 2026– | Tranmere Rovers | 0 | (0) |

International career^{‡}
| 2019 | England U16 | 4 | (0) |
| 2019 | England U17 | 4 | (0) |
| 2022 | Jamaica U20 | 5 | (0) |
| 2023– | Jamaica | 3 | (0) |
- * Club domestic league appearances and goals as of 19:58, 27 April 2026 (UTC) ‡ National team caps and goals as of 30 May 2026

Coniah Chronicles Boyce-Clarke (born 1 March 2003) is a professional footballer who plays as a goalkeeper for League Two club Tranmere Rovers. Born in England, he plays for the Jamaica national team.

== Club career ==
=== Reading ===
On 28 May 2019, Boyce-Clarke agreed to sign a professional contract with Reading, until the summer of 2023, to commence the summer after his 17th birthday. On 2 July 2020, Boyce-Clarke signed his first professional contract with Reading.

On 8 July, Boyce-Clarke joined Bath City to train with and feature in the forthcoming pre-season games.

On 19 November 2021, Boyce-Clarke joined St Albans City on an initial one-month youth loan.

On 18 March 2022, Boyce-Clarke joined Welling United on loan for the remainder of the season.

On 8 May 2023, the last day of the 2022–23 season, Boyce-Clarke made his debut for Reading in a 2–0 defeat, becoming the clubs 76th Academy graduate to play for the senior squad. On 10 August 2023, Boyce-Clarke signed a new two-year contract. On 16 May 2025, Reading announced that Boyce-Clarke would leave the club when his contract expired on 30 June 2025.

=== Aldershot Town ===
On 25 November 2025, Aldershot Town announced the signing of Boyce-Clarke on non-contract terms. Boyce-Clarke made his debut for Aldershot Town the same day, coming on as a half-time substitute for Marcus Dewhurst in their 2–1 victory over Fulham U21's. On 27 April 2026, it was announced that Boyce-Clark would leave the club at the end of his contract in June.

== International career ==
In March 2023, Boyce-Clarke earned his first call up to the Jamaica national football team for their match against Mexico in the CONCACAF Nations League. He made his senior debut at the 2023 CONCACAF Gold Cup against Saint Kitts and Nevis.

== Career statistics ==
=== Club ===
As of match played 23 September 2026

Appearances and goals by club, season and competition
| Club | Season | League | | | National Cup | | League Cup | | Continental | | Other | | Total | |
| Club | Season | Division | Apps | Goals | Apps | Goals | Apps | Goals | Apps | Goals | Apps | Goals | Apps | Goals |
|---|---|---|---|---|---|---|---|---|---|---|---|---|---|---|
| Reading | 2021–22 | EFL Championship | 0 | 0 | 0 | 0 | 0 | 0 | — | | | | 0 | 0 |
| Reading | 2022–23 | EFL Championship | 1 | 0 | 0 | 0 | 0 | 0 | — | | | | 1 | 0 |
| Reading | 2023–24 | EFL League One | 0 | 0 | 0 | 0 | 2 | 0 | — | | 1 (Note: Appearance(s) in EFL Trophy) | 0 | 3 | 0 |
| Reading | 2024–25 | EFL League One | 1 | 0 | 0 | 0 | 1 | 0 | — | | 1 | 0 | 3 | 0 |
| Reading | Total | | 2 | 0 | 0 | 0 | 3 | 0 | 0 | 0 | 2 | 0 | 7 | 0 |
| St Albans City (loan) | 2021–22 | National League South | 3 | 0 | 1 | 0 | 0 | 0 | — | | 1 (Note: Appearances in the FA Trophy) | 0 | 5 | 0 |
| Welling United (loan) | 2021–22 | National League South | 8 | 0 | 0 | 0 | 0 | 0 | — | | 0 | 0 | 8 | 0 |
| Aldershot Town | 2025–26 | National League | 25 | 0 | 0 | 0 | — | | — | | 2 (Note: One appearance in National League Cup, one in FA Trophy) | 0 | 27 | 0 |
| Tranmere Rovers | 2026–27 | League Two | 0 | 0 | 0 | 0 | 0 | 0 | — | | 1 | 0 | 1 | 0 |
| Career total | | | 38 | 0 | 0 | 0 | 3 | 0 | 0 | 0 | 5 | 0 | 48 | 0 |

=== International ===
As of match played 30 May 2026

Appearances and goals by national team and year
| National team | Year | Apps | Goals |
|---|---|---|---|
| Jamaica | 2023 | 1 | 0 |
| Jamaica | 2026 | 2 | 0 |
| Total | | 3 | 0 |
