= Basil Tuma =

Maltese footballer (born 2005)

Personal information
- Full name: Basil Tenywa Tuma
- Date of birth: 24 April 2005 (age 21)
- Place of birth: Uganda
- Positions: Winger; striker

Team information
- Current team: Aldershot Town
- Number: 10

Youth career
- –2021: Fulham
- 2022–2023: Reading

Senior career*
Years	Team	Apps	(Gls)
2022–2026	Reading	6	(0)
2025–2026	→ Slough Town (loan)	12	(3)
2026–	Aldershot Town	0	(0)

International career^{‡}
2021–2022	Uganda U17		
2022–2024	Malta U19	5	(1)
2023–2025	Malta U21	6	(0)
2024–	Malta	11	(1)
- * Club domestic league appearances and goals as of 12:40, 27 April 2026 (UTC) ‡ National team caps and goals as of 19:50, 18 November 2026 (UTC)

Basil Tenywa Tuma (born 24 April 2005) is a professional footballer who plays as a winger for National League club Aldershot Town. Born in Uganda, he plays for the Malta national team.

== Early life ==
Tuma was educated at Eton College and finished 3rd in the Junior Boys 100 metres at the 2019 ESAA English Schools Track & Field Championships with a time of 11.23 seconds. He is studying for a history degree at King's College London.

== Club career ==
=== Reading ===
Tuma made his debut for Reading in their 2–1 EFL Cup defeat to Stevenage on 9 August 2022, playing 55 minutes before being replaced by Jahmari Clarke.

On 2 July 2025, Reading announced that Tuma had signed a new one-year contract with the club.

On 16 December 2025, Reading announced Tuma had joined Slough Town on loan until 10 January 2026. On 13 January 2026 Tuma's loan deal was extended again, this time until mid-March 2026. Tuma scored his first goal for Slough on 31 January against Chelmsford. On 11 May 2026, Reading announced that Tuma would be released from the club at the end of his contract in June 2026.

== International career ==
Tuma represented Uganda at the 2020 CECAFA U-17 Championship, where they were victorious over Tanzania in the final. Tuma was then called up for the Malta U19 in September 2022. Tuma made his debut for the Malta U21 team in a 0-6 defeat to Spain on 8 September 2023.

In October 2024, Tuma was called up to the Maltese senior international team for the first time, for their matches against Turkmenistan and Moldova. After their match against Turkmenistan was cancelled due to travel issues faced by Turkmenistan, Tuma made his debut for Malta against Moldova on 13 October 2024, coming on as a halt-time substitute to win the match-winning penalty.

== Career statistics ==
=== Club ===
As of match played 25 April 2026

Appearances and goals by club, season and competition
Club	Season	League			FA Cup		EFL Cup		Other		Total	
Club	Season	Division	Apps	Goals	Apps	Goals	Apps	Goals	Apps	Goals	Apps	Goals
Reading	2022–23	Championship	0	0	0	0	1	0	–		1	0
Reading	2023–24	League One	2	0	0	0	2	0	–		4	0
Reading	2024–25	League One	4	0	2	0	0	0	1 (Note: Appearance in EFL Trophy)	0	7	0
Reading	2025–26	League One	0	0	0	0	0	0	1	0	1	0
Reading	Total		6	0	2	0	3	0	2	0	13	0
Slough Town (loan)	2025–26	National League South	12	3	0	0	—		0	0	12	3
Career total			18	3	2	0	3	0	2	0	25	3

=== International ===
As of match played 16 November 2026

Appearances and goals by national team and year
National team	Year	Apps	Goals
Malta	2026	11	1
Total		11	1

Scores and results list Malta's goal tally first, score column indicates score after each Tuma goal.

List of international goals scored by Basil Tuma
No.	Date	Venue	Opponent	Score	Result	Competition
1	12 November 2026	National Stadium, Ta' Qali, Malta	Eswatini	1–1	1–1	Friendly

== Honours ==
Uganda U17

- CECAFA U-17 Championship: 2020
