= Mamadou Loum =

Senegalese footballer

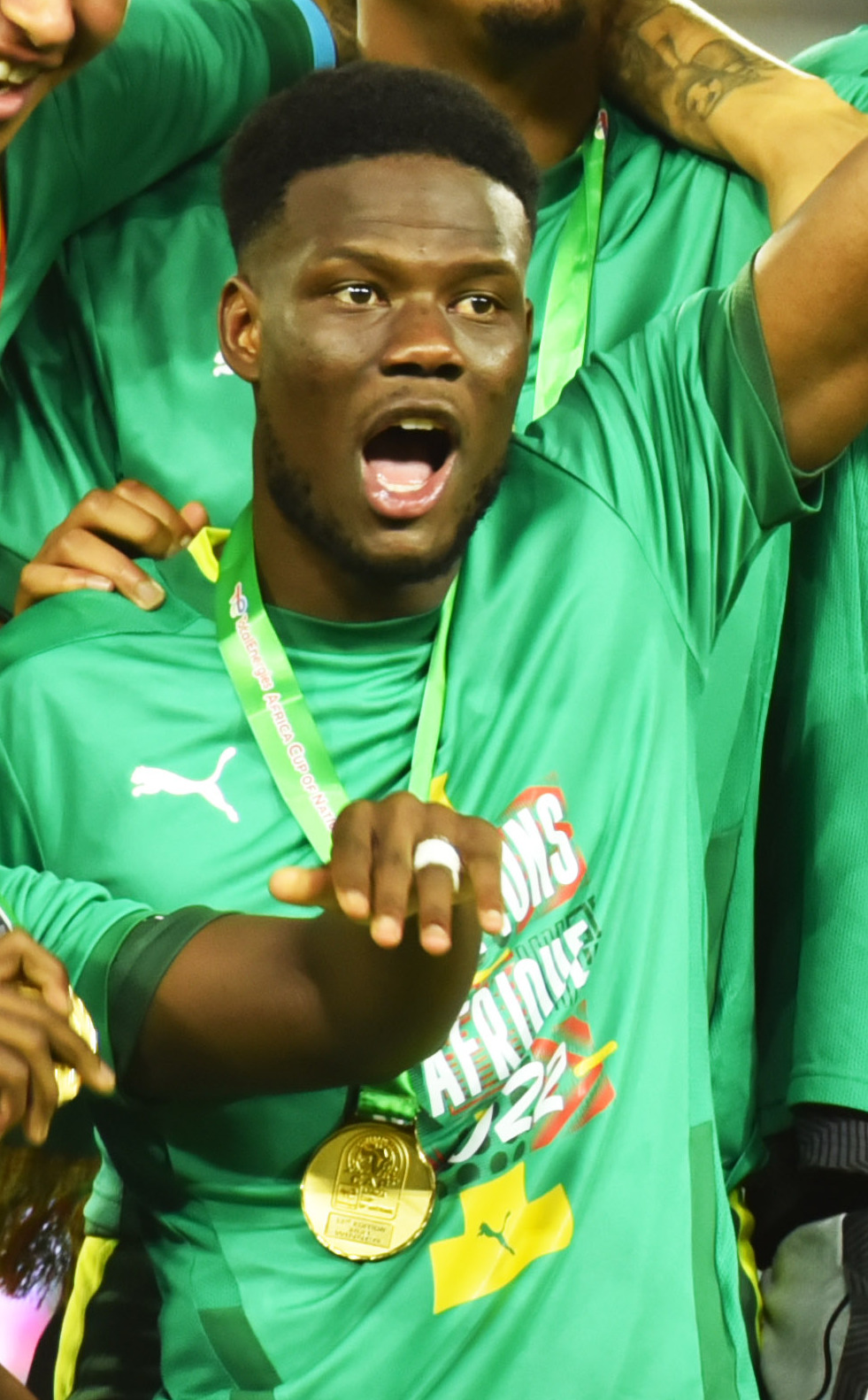
- Loum in 2022.

Personal information
- Full name: Mamadou Loum N'Diaye
- Date of birth: 30 December 1996 (age 29)
- Place of birth: Dakar, Senegal
- Height: 1.88 m (6 ft 2 in)
- Position: Defensive midfielder

Team information
- Current team: Sporting Gijón
- Number: 21

Senior career*
Years	Team	Apps	(Gls)
2014–2015	Ouakam		
2015–2019	Braga B	68	(4)
2018–2019	→ Moreirense (loan)	17	(3)
2019	→ Porto (loan)	2	(0)
2019–2024	Porto	11	(1)
2019	Porto B	1	(0)
2021–2022	→ Alavés (loan)	32	(2)
2022–2023	→ Reading (loan)	29	(1)
2023–2024	→ Al Raed (loan)	29	(0)
2024–2025	Arouca	21	(0)
2025–	Sporting Gijón	5	(0)

International career
2015	Senegal U20	10	(0)
2019–2022	Senegal	3	(0)
Medal record
Men's football
Representing Senegal
African U-20 Championship
Silver medal – second place	2015 Senegal
Africa Cup of Nations
Winner	2021 Cameroon
- * Club domestic league appearances and goals as of 29 November 2025

Mamadou Loum N'Diaye (born 30 December 1996) is a Senegalese professional footballer who plays as a defensive midfielder for Spanish club Sporting Gijón.

== Club career ==
Loum made his professional debut in the Segunda Liga for S.C. Braga B on 15 August 2015 in a game against Gil Vicente F.C., as a 70th-minute substitute for Carlos Fortes. He was called up once for S.C. Braga for their Primeira Liga game away to F.C. Paços de Ferreira on 23 April 2017, remaining unused in a 3–1 loss. A day before the anniversary of that game, he was sent off at the end of a 2–2 home draw with Académico de Viseu FC.

On 30 July 2018, Loum was loaned to top-flight team Moreirense F.C. for the season. He scored his first goal on 2 November in a 3–1 win at eventual champions S.L. Benfica.

In January 2019, Loum moved to FC Porto on a loan deal for the rest of the season with an option to turn the deal permanent. He played three games over the rest of the season and then the club paid €7.75 million for 75% of his economic rights. On 2 December, he started a 2–0 home win over Paços de Ferreira and scored the opening goal.

On 23 July 2021, after featuring rarely for Porto, Loum was loaned to La Liga side Deportivo Alavés for the 2021–22 campaign.

On 30 July 2022, Loum joined EFL Championship club Reading on a season-long loan. On 10 August 2023, he joined Saudi Pro League club Al-Raed on a season-long loan.

On 2 September 2024 it was confirmed that Loum joined F.C. Arouca on a deal until June 2026. On 12 August of the following year, he moved to Spanish Segunda División side Sporting Gijón on a two-year contract.

== International career ==
Loum represented Senegal at the 2015 FIFA U-20 World Cup. He made his debut for the senior team on 26 March 2019 in a friendly against Mali, playing the full 90 minutes of a 2–1 win in Dakar. He was called up for the 2021 Africa Cup of Nations, which the team won in Cameroon at the start of the following year; his one appearance was a goalless draw with neighbours Guinea in the second group game.

He was appointed a Grand Officer of the National Order of the Lion by President of Senegal Macky Sall following the nation's victory at the 2021 Africa Cup of Nations.

== Career statistics ==
=== Club ===
As of match played 2 December 2023

Appearances and goals by club, season and competition
Club	Season	League			National cup		League cup		Continental		Total	
Club	Season	Division	Apps	Goals	Apps	Goals	Apps	Goals	Apps	Goals	Apps	Goals
Braga B	2015–16	LigaPro	19	1	—		—		—		19	1
Braga B	2016–17	LigaPro	22	2	—		—		—		22	2
Braga B	2017–18	LigaPro	27	1	—		—		—		27	1
Braga B	Total		68	4	—		—		—		68	4
Moreirense (loan)	2018–19	Primeira Liga	17	3	3	0	—		—		20	3
Porto (loan)	2018–19	Primeira Liga	2	0	1	0	0	0	—		3	0
Porto	2019–20	Primeira Liga	6	1	4	0	0	0	1 (Note: Appearance(s) in UEFA Europa League)	0	11	1
Porto	2020–21	Primeira Liga	3	0	3	0	0	0	3 (Note: Appearance(s) in UEFA Champions League)	0	9	0
Porto	Total		11	1	8	0	0	0	4	0	23	1
Porto B	2019–20	LigaPro	1	0	—		—		—		1	0
Alavés (loan)	2021–22	La Liga	32	2	0	0	—		—		32	2
Reading (loan)	2022–23	Championship	29	1	2	0	1	0	—		32	1
Al Raed (loan)	2023–24	Saudi Pro League	12	0	0	0	—		—		12	0
Career total			170	11	13	0	1	0	4	0	188	11

=== International ===
As of match played 14 January 2022

Appearances and goals by national team and year
National team	Year	Apps	Goals
Senegal	2019	2	0
Senegal	2020	0	0
Senegal	2021	0	0
Senegal	2022	1	0
Total		3	0

== Honours ==
Porto

- Primeira Liga: 2019–20
- Taça de Portugal: 2019–20

Senegal

- Africa Cup of Nations: 2021

Individual

- Grand Officer of the National Order of the Lion: 2022
