= Andy Yiadom =

Ghana international footballer (born 1991)

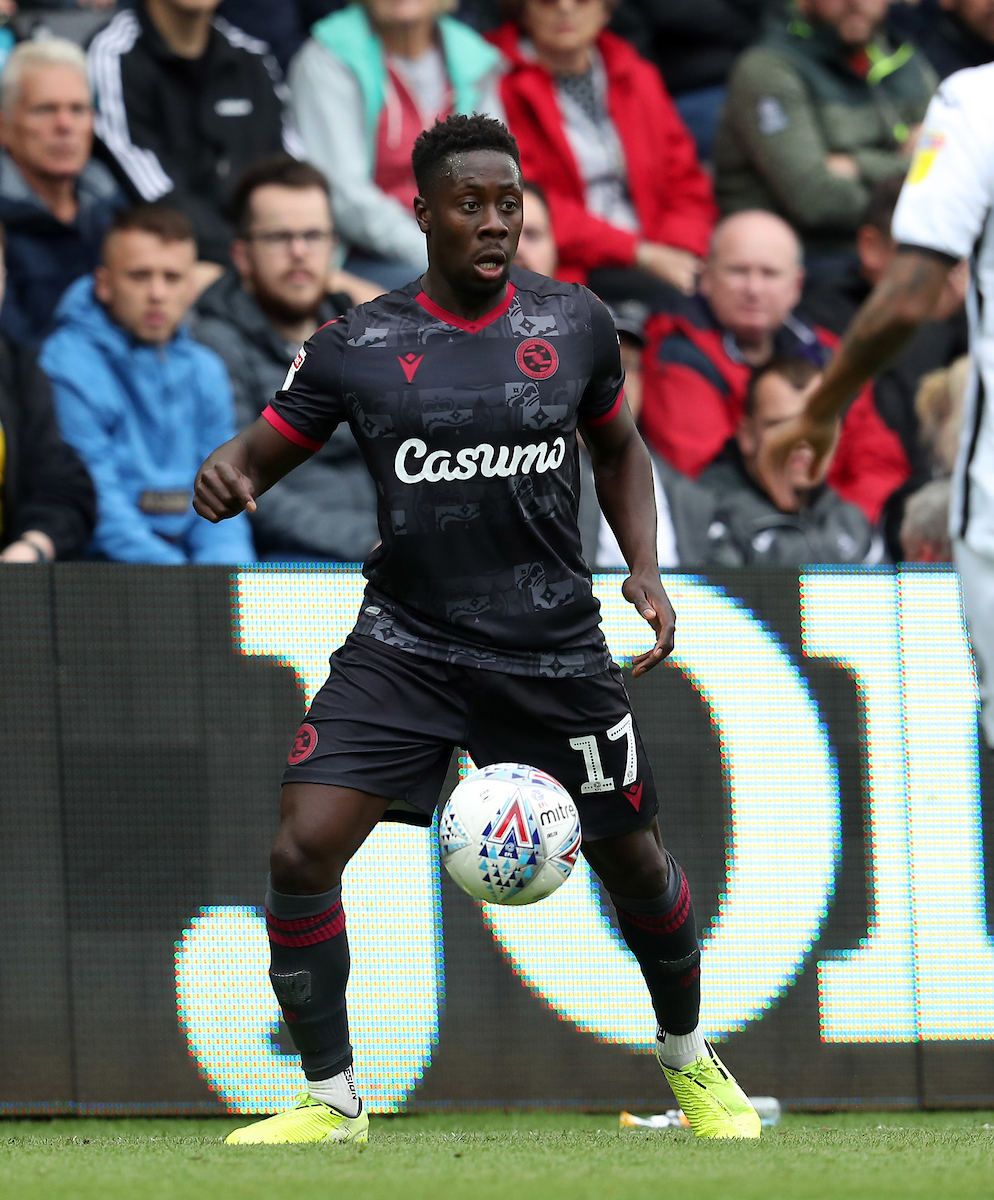

Personal information
- Full name: Andrew Kyere Yiadom
- Date of birth: 2 December 1991 (age 34)
- Place of birth: Holloway, England
- Height: 1.80 m (5 ft 11 in)
- Position: Right back

Team information
- Current team: AFC Wimbledon
- Number: 17

Youth career
- 2008–2010: Watford

Senior career*
| Years | Team | Apps | (Gls) |
| 2010–2011 | Hayes & Yeading United | 36 | (1) |
| 2011–2012 | Braintree Town | 28 | (7) |
| 2012–2016 | Barnet | 169 | (14) |
| 2016–2018 | Barnsley | 64 | (0) |
| 2018–2026 | Reading | 244 | (4) |
| 2026– | AFC Wimbledon | 10 | (0) |

International career^{‡}
| 2014–2015 | England C | 4 | (2) |
| 2017–2022 | Ghana | 26 | (0) |
- * Club domestic league appearances and goals as of 1 November 2026 (UTC) ‡ National team caps and goals as of 22:25, 10 December 2022 (UTC)

Andrew Kyere Yiadom (born 2 December 1991) is a professional footballer who plays as a right back for EFL League One club AFC Wimbledon. Born in England, he plays for the Ghana national team.

== Club career ==
=== Early career ===
Yiadom was born in Holloway, Greater London. He started his career in the youth team of Watford but wasn't offered a professional contract at the end of his scholarship. He signed for Conference Premier club Hayes & Yeading United in the summer of 2010. He only stayed for one season at Hayes before moving on to newly promoted Conference Premier club Braintree Town in August 2011, following a trial at League Two club Bristol Rovers. Yiadom scored seven goals by January 2012.

=== Barnet ===
He was signed by League Two club Barnet on 31 January 2012. He made his debut for the Bees on 18 February 2012 in a 2–1 defeat to Shrewsbury Town, coming on as a substitute for Mark Hughes. He scored his first goal for the club on 10 March whilst coming on as a substitute in a 2–1 win against Port Vale.

Yiadom played an important role during Barnet's 2012–13 season. He was preferred as the right sided winger in Edgar Davids' 4–5–1 formation, with Ricky Holmes on the opposite wing. Yiadom became popular with fans for his pace, which he used to good effect on the wing, where he posed a threat to many opposition teams. Similar to Mark Byrne, Yiadom was used at times as a replacement right back following injuries and suspensions to first choice Barry Fuller. He started the last match at Underhill Stadium against Wycombe Wanderers, helping the Bees to a 1–0 win. His impressive performance earned him a spot in the Barnet line-up on the final match of the season against Northampton Town, though in his unnatural position of right back, with new signing Keanu Marsh-Brown being preferred to start on the right wing. Yiadom scored three goals in 31 appearances during the 2012–13 season.

=== Barnsley ===
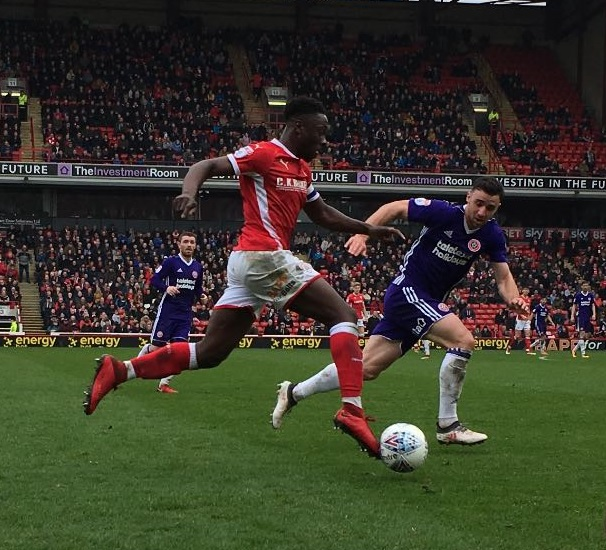
Yiadom (in red) playing for Barnsley in 2018.

Yiadom joined Barnsley in May 2016 for a free transfer, on a two-year contract. He made 32 appearances for Barnsley in his first season, helping them retain Championship status impressing at right back. He was offered a new deal by Barnsley on 30 July 2017, which he turned down.

On 10 August 2017, after rejecting two bids from Premier League club Huddersfield Town, Barnsley agreed a fee with Huddersfield (believed to be around £3 million) for the signing with the player to undertake a medical to complete the move, However, on 18 August 2017, the move collapsed and Yiadom returned to Barnsley. On transfer deadline day 31 August 2017, Yiadom had agreed to join Premier League side Swansea City, However, on 1 September, it was stated that the paperwork for the transfer had not been received before the transfer window deadline of 23:00 BST, and hence the move had been canceled, forcing Yiadom to return to Barnsley.

He was made Barnsley captain during the 2017–18 season.

=== Reading ===
On 17 May 2018, Yiadom agreed to join Reading at the end of his contract, joining up with the Royals on 1 July after signing a four-year contract. On 17 June 2022, Yiadom signed a new three-year contract with Reading, and then was named as the clubs new Club Captain on 8 July 2022.

On 25 June 2025, Reading announced Yiadom had signed a new one-year contract with the club. On 17 March 2026, Yiadom made his 250th appearance for Reading in a 2–1 victory over Burton Albion.

On 5 May 2026, Reading announced that after 8 years with the club, Yiadom would leave when his contract expires on 30 June 2026.

After being released by Reading, Yiadom trained with Blackpool during their pre-season camp in Spain.

=== AFC Wimbledon ===
On 17 August 2026, Yiadom signed a contract with EFL League One club AFC Wimbledon until January 2027.

== International career ==
Yiadom was born in England to Ghanaian parents. He was called up to the English national C team, and was named their player of the year in 2015. In November 2016 he was called up to the Ghana national team. He made his debut for Ghana in a 1–0 2017 Africa Cup of Nations loss to Egypt.

He was part of the Ghana National Team in the 2021 Africa Cup of Nations that was eliminated at the group stage of the competition.

== Career statistics ==
=== Club ===
As of match played 2 May 2026

Appearances and goals by club, season and competition
| Club | Season | League | | | FA Cup | | League Cup | | Other | | Total | |
| Club | Season | Division | Apps | Goals | Apps | Goals | Apps | Goals | Apps | Goals | Apps | Goals |
|---|---|---|---|---|---|---|---|---|---|---|---|---|
| Hayes & Yeading United | 2010–11 | Conference Premier | 36 | 1 | 2 | 0 | — | | 1 (Note: Appearance(s) in FA Trophy) | 0 | 39 | 1 |
| Braintree Town | 2011–12 | Conference Premier | 28 | 7 | 1 | 1 | — | | 3 | 0 | 32 | 8 |
| Barnet | 2011–12 | League Two | 7 | 1 | — | | — | | — | | 7 | 1 |
| Barnet | 2012–13 | League Two | 39 | 3 | 1 | 0 | 1 | 0 | 1 (Note: Appearance in Football League Trophy) | 0 | 42 | 3 |
| Barnet | 2013–14 | Conference Premier | 42 | 1 | 1 | 0 | — | | 2 | 0 | 45 | 1 |
| Barnet | 2014–15 | Conference Premier | 41 | 3 | 3 | 0 | — | | 0 | 0 | 44 | 3 |
| Barnet | 2015–16 | League Two | 40 | 6 | 2 | 0 | 1 | 1 | 0 | 0 | 43 | 7 |
| Barnet | Total | | 169 | 14 | 7 | 0 | 2 | 1 | 3 | 0 | 181 | 15 |
| Barnsley | 2016–17 | Championship | 32 | 0 | 0 | 0 | 1 | 0 | — | | 33 | 0 |
| Barnsley | 2017–18 | Championship | 32 | 0 | 0 | 0 | 1 | 0 | — | | 33 | 0 |
| Barnsley | Total | | 64 | 0 | 0 | 0 | 2 | 0 | — | | 66 | 0 |
| Reading | 2018–19 | Championship | 45 | 1 | 1 | 0 | 2 | 0 | — | | 48 | 1 |
| Reading | 2019–20 | Championship | 24 | 1 | 1 | 0 | 0 | 0 | — | | 25 | 1 |
| Reading | 2020–21 | Championship | 21 | 1 | 0 | 0 | 0 | 0 | — | | 21 | 1 |
| Reading | 2021–22 | Championship | 38 | 1 | 0 | 0 | 0 | 0 | — | | 38 | 1 |
| Reading | 2022–23 | Championship | 41 | 0 | 1 | 0 | 0 | 0 | — | | 42 | 1 |
| Reading | 2023–24 | League One | 32 | 0 | 0 | 0 | 1 | 0 | 1 | 0 | 34 | 0 |
| Reading | 2024–25 | League One | 14 | 0 | 0 | 0 | 0 | 0 | 0 | 0 | 14 | 0 |
| Reading | 2025–26 | League One | 29 | 0 | 1 | 0 | 0 | 0 | 1 | 0 | 31 | 0 |
| Reading | Total | | 244 | 4 | 4 | 0 | 3 | 0 | 2 | 0 | 253 | 4 |
| AFC Wimbledon | 2026–27 | League One | 0 | 0 | 0 | 0 | 0 | 0 | 0 | 0 | 0 | 0 |
| Career total | | | 541 | 26 | 14 | 1 | 7 | 1 | 9 | 0 | 571 | 28 |

=== International ===
As of match played 5 June 2022

Appearances and goals by national team and year
| National team | Year | Apps | Goals |
|---|---|---|---|
| Ghana | 2017 | 2 | 0 |
| Ghana | 2018 | 3 | 0 |
| Ghana | 2019 | 8 | 0 |
| Ghana | 2020 | 0 | 0 |
| Ghana | 2021 | 5 | 0 |
| Ghana | 2022 | 6 | 0 |
| Total | | 24 | 0 |

== Honours ==
Barnet

- Conference Premier: 2014–15

Individual

- Conference Premier Team of the Year: 2014–15
- Reading Player of the Season: 2021–22
