= Jahmari Clarke =

English footballer (born 2003)

Personal information
- Full name: Jahmari Oshown Clarke
- Date of birth: 2 October 2003 (age 23)
- Place of birth: England
- Height: 1.91 m (6 ft 3 in)
- Position: Forward

Youth career
- Reading

Senior career*
Years	Team	Apps	(Gls)
2021–2024	Reading	12	(2)
2022	→ Woking (loan)	2	(1)
2023	→ Forest Green Rovers (loan)	4	(1)
2023–2024	→ Boreham Wood (loan)	5	(0)
2024	→ Yeovil Town (loan)	3	(2)
2024	Wealdstone	2	(0)
2024	Basingstoke Town	1	(0)
2024	Croydon Athletic	3	(1)
2025	Yeovil Town	1	(0)
2025–2026	Montego Bay United	26	(6)

International career^{‡}
2022	Jamaica U20	5	(3)
- * Club domestic league appearances and goals as of 11:08, 6 November 2026 (UTC) ‡ National team caps and goals as of 27 June 2022

Jahmari Oshown Clarke (born 2 October 2003) is a professional footballer who plays as a forward, most recently for Montego Bay United in the Jamaica Premier League. Born in England, he is a youth international for Jamaica.

== Career ==
Clarke made his professional debut with Reading in a 3–0 EFL Cup loss to Swansea City on 10 August 2021. Seven days later, 17 August 2021, Clarke replaced George Pușcaș in the 76th minute during a 3–2 defeat to Bristol City to make his league debut. Clarke's first goals for Reading came on 6 November 2021, when he again came off the bench to replace George Pușcaș, and then scored both Reading's goals in a 2-1 victory over Birmingham City.

On 7 July 2022, Reading confirmed that Clarke had signed a new contract with the club.

On 29 October 2022, Clarke joined Woking on a month-long youth loan deal. On 31 January 2023, Clarke joined Forest Green Rovers on loan for the remainder of the season.

On 7 December 2023, Clarke joined Boreham Wood on loan until 28 January 2024.

On 16 March 2024, Clarke joined Yeovil Town on loan until the end of the season.

On 23 May 2024, Reading announced he would be released in the summer once his contract expired.

On 17 August 2024, Clarke joined National League side Wealdstone on a short-term deal. On 30 August 2024, Wealdstone announced that Clarke had been released from his contract.

On 12 November 2024, Basingstoke Town announced the signing of Clarke on a short-term contract.

In March 2025, Clarke returned to National League side Yeovil Town on non-contract terms.

On 25 August 2025, Clarke signed for Montego Bay United in the Jamaica Premier League. Clarke left Montego Bay United at the end of the season when his contract expired.

== International career ==
In May 2022, Clarke was selected for the Jamaica Under-20 team for the 2022 CONCACAF U-20 Championship. He scored on his U20 debut against Costa Rica when after coming off the bench, he won and scored a penalty in the 98th minute, making the score line 1-1.

== Career statistics ==
=== Club ===
As of match played 24 May 2026

Appearances and goals by club, season and competition
Club	Season	League			National Cup (Note: Includes FA Cup and JFF Champions Cup)		League Cup (Note: Includes EFL Cup)		Other		Total	
Club	Season	Division	Apps	Goals	Apps	Goals	Apps	Goals	Apps	Goals	Apps	Goals
Reading	2021–22	Championship	12	2	0	0	1	0	—		13	2
Reading	2022–23	Championship	0	0	0	0	1	0	—		1	0
Reading	2023–24	League One	0	0	0	0	0	0	0	0	0	0
Reading	Total		12	2	0	0	2	0	0	0	14	2
Woking (loan)	2022–23	National League	2	1	—		—		—		2	1
Forest Green Rovers	2022–23	League One	4	1	—		—		—		4	1
Boreham Wood (loan)	2023–24	National League	5	0	—		—		1 (Note: Appearance in FA Trophy)	0	6	0
Yeovil Town (loan)	2023–24	National League South	3	2	—		—		—		3	2
Wealdstone	2024–25	National League	2	0	0	0	—		0	0	2	0
Basingstoke Town	2024–25	Southern League Premier Division South	1	0	0	0	—		0	0	1	0
Croydon Athletic	2024–25	Isthmian League South East Division	3	1	—		—		—		3	1
Yeovil Town	2024–25	National League	1	0	—		—		—		1	0
Montego Bay United	2025–26	Jamaica Premier League	26	6	0	0	—		2 (Note: Appearances in the Jamaica Premier League Playoffs)	0	28	6
Career total			61	12	0	0	2	0	1	0	64	12

=== International ===
Appearances and goals by national team and year
National team	Year	Apps	Goals
Jamaica U20	2022	5	3
