= Jeriel Dorsett =

Montserratian footballer

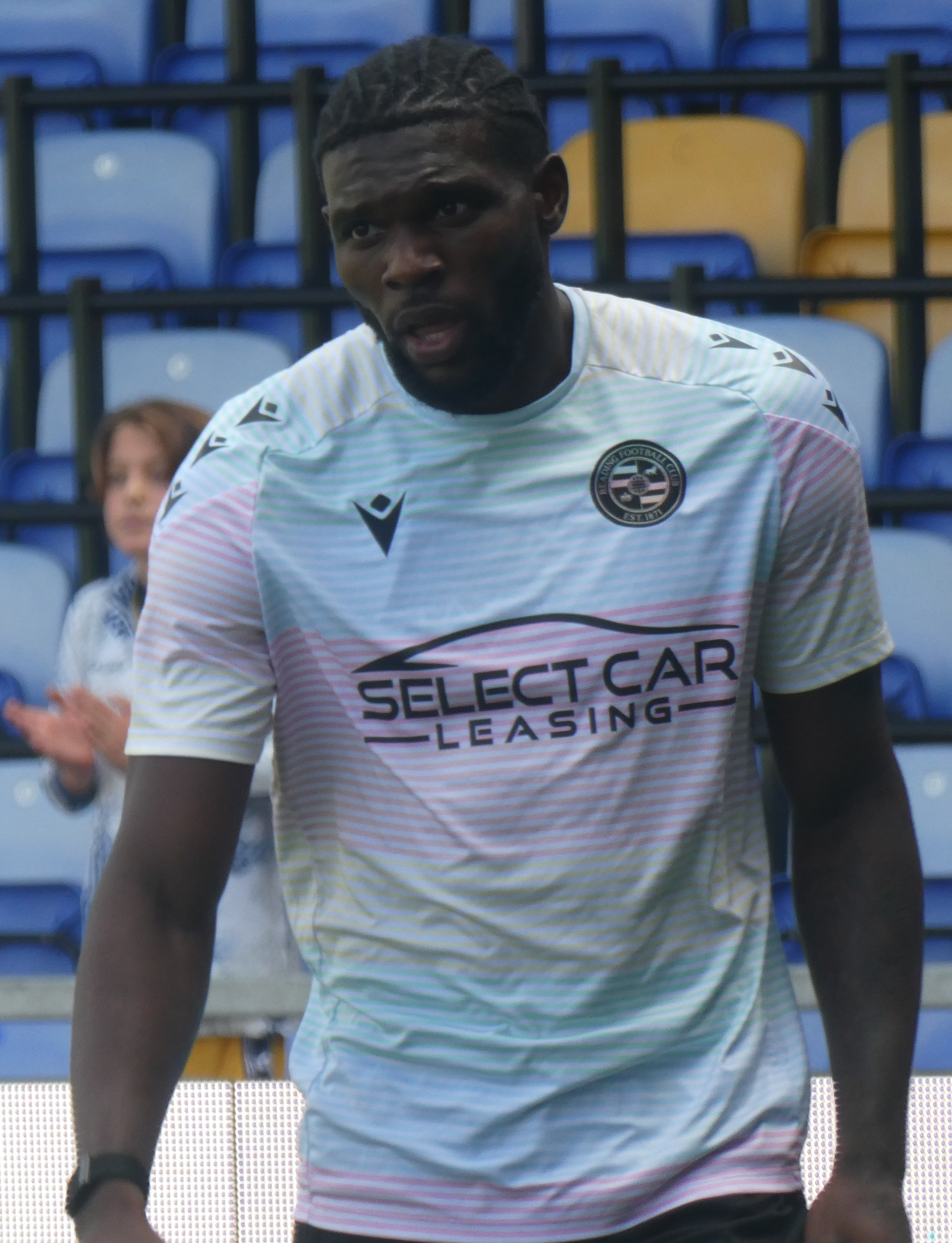
- Dorsett with Reading in 2026

Personal information
- Full name: Abraham Jeriel Richard Dorsett
- Date of birth: 4 May 2002 (age 24)
- Place of birth: Enfield, England
- Height: 1.85 m (6 ft 1 in)
- Position: Defender

Team information
- Current team: Reading
- Number: 3

Youth career
- 2018–2023: Reading

Senior career*
Years	Team	Apps	(Gls)
2023–	Reading	78	(3)
2021–2022	→ Rochdale (loan)	37	(0)
2022–2023	→ Kilmarnock (loan)	11	(1)

International career^{‡}
2017	England U17	1	(0)
2018	England U18	4	(0)
2023–	Montserrat	11	(0)
- * Club domestic league appearances and goals as of 09:45, 15 October 2026 (UTC) ‡ National team caps and goals as of 09:45, 15 October 2026 (UTC)

Abraham Jeriel Richard Dorsett (born 4 May 2002) is a professional footballer who plays as a defender for Reading. Born in England, he plays for the Montserrat national team.

== Club career ==
=== Reading ===
On 21 October 2019, Dorsett signed his first professional contract with Reading. Dorsett made his professional debut with Reading in the 1–0 FA Cup loss to Luton Town on 9 January 2021.

==== Loan Spells ====
On 20 August 2021, Dorsett joined Rochdale on a season long loan. During his time with Rochdale, Dorsett won the club's Young Player of the Season award.

Following a successful season, he then moved to Kilmarnock in August 2022 on a season-long loan. On 4 March 2023, Dorsett scored his first senior goal, the consolation in a 3-1 defeat to Rangers at Ibrox Stadium. This was Dorsett's only goal for the club.

==== Return to Reading ====
On 11 July 2023, Dorsett signed a new one-year contract with the club, until the summer of 2024.

On 8 May 2024, Reading activated a one-year extension to Dorsett's contract, keeping him at the club until the summer of 2025. On 1 July 2025, Reading announced that Dorsett had signed another one-year contract with the club. On 5 May 2026, Reading announced that they had activated a one-year contract extension in Dorestt's contract, keeping him at the club until the summer of 2027.

== International career ==
Dorsett represented England at U17 and U18 level.

Dorsett was called up to the Montserrat senior squad for the first time in September 2023, for their matches in the 2023–24 CONCACAF Nations League B against Barbados and Dominican Republic.

== Career statistics ==
=== Club ===
As of match played 13 October 2026

Appearances and goals by club, season and competition.
Club	Season	League			National Cup		League Cup		Other		Total	
Club	Season	Division	Apps	Goals	Apps	Goals	Apps	Goals	Apps	Goals	Apps	Goals
Reading	2019–20	EFL Championship	0	0	1	0	0	0	—		1	0
Reading	2020–21	EFL Championship	0	0	1	0	0	0	—		1	0
Reading	2021–22	EFL Championship	0	0	0	0	0	0	—		0	0
Reading	2022–23	EFL Championship	0	0	0	0	0	0	—		0	0
Reading	2023–24	EFL League One	23	1	1	0	1	0	2 (Note: Appearances in the EFL Trophy)	0	27	1
Reading	2024–25	EFL League One	14	0	1	0	0	0	1	0	16	0
Reading	2025–26	EFL League One	39	2	1	0	1	0	1	0	42	2
Reading	2026–27	EFL League One	2	0	0	0	3	0	2	0	7	0
Reading	Total		78	3	5	0	5	0	6	0	94	3
Rochdale (loan)	2021–22	EFL League Two	37	0	3	0	2	0	3	0	45	0
Kilmarnock (loan)	2022–23	Scottish Premiership	11	1	1	0	0	0	—		12	1
Career total			126	4	9	0	7	0	9	0	149	4

=== International ===
As of match played 6 October 2026

Appearances and goals by national team and year
National team	Year	Apps	Goals
Montserrat	2023	5	0
Montserrat	2024	2	0
Montserrat	2025	0	0
Montserrat	2026	4	0
Total		11	0
