= Fatuhada =

Village in Dili, Timor-Leste

Fatuhada (formerly: Beira Mar) is a suco ("village") in Timor-Leste under the Administrative Post Dom Aleixo Administrative Post in Dili Municipality, within the capital city Dili.

== Geography ==
Fatuhada lies on the banks of the Bay of Dili, to the West of the city centre of Dili, in the Northeast part of Dom Aleixo. It is surrounded by the Suco Kampung Alor to the East, Bairro Pite to the South, Comoro to the Southwest, and Bebonuk to the West. Fatuhada has an area of 1.24 square kilometres.

The Suco is divided into five Aldeias ("communities"), namely Zero I, Zero II, Zero III, Zero IV und Zero V. In the Northwest is the city district of Mataruak, in the West Markoni, in the Southwest Lurumata, in the South Bedik and in the Southeast Fatuhada.

The Foreign Ministry and the Embassy of the United States are located in Fatuhada. Several schools are located in Fatuhada, namely the primary school Escola Primaria Fatuhada, Dili International School (DIS), the private QSI International School, Escola Pre-Secondario 10 de Setembro, and Escola Secondario 10 de Setembro. The party headquarters of FRETILIN are located next to the latter schools.

== Residents ==
As of 2022, there are 18,541 residents, of which 9,312 are men and 9,229 are women. The entire population of the Suco live in an urban environment. There are 3,372 households. 93% of the residents reported Tetum Prasa as their mother tongue. Minority languages spoken there are Rahesuk, Naueti, Makasae, Sa'ani, Makalero, Fataluku and Baikeno.

== Politics ==
In the local elections of 2004/2005, Justino M. G. Leite was elected as the chief of the Suco. Marcelino Soares won the 2009 election; he was re-elected in 2016.

== History ==
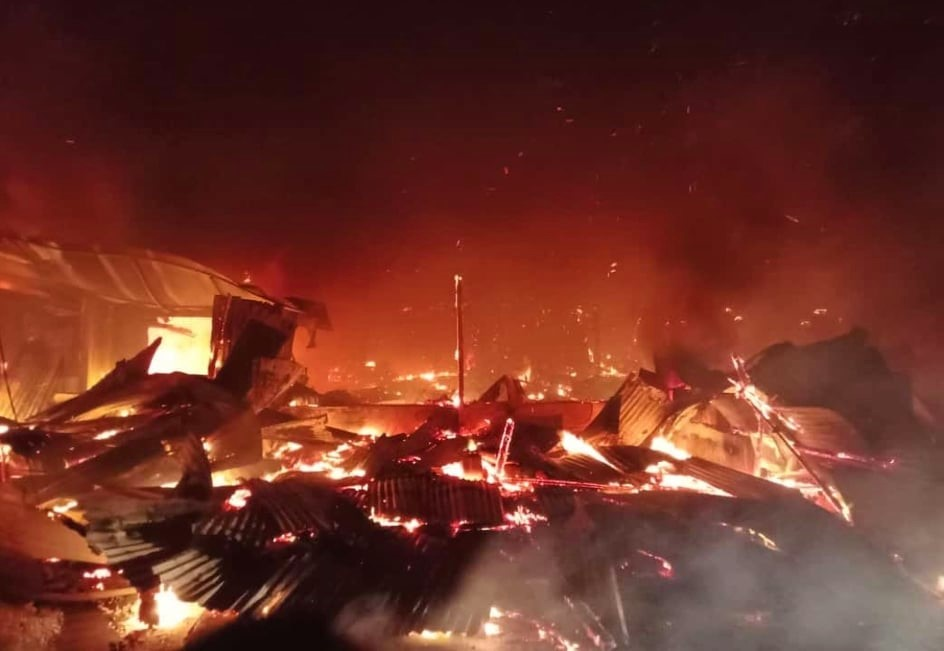
Fire at the market of Comoro (2021)

The Market of Comoro (Portuguese: Mercado Comoro) was formerly located on the Rua de Manu Aman, in the Aldeia Zero III (Lurumata district), in the West of Fatuhada. During the 2006 East Timorese crisis, there was a clash between gangs at the market that was quelled by 100 international police and Australian soldiers.

The market was moved to Manleuana in 2012, and residential houses were built on the site. During the night of 29 July 2021, there was a large fire that destroyed 400 houses.
