= List of Reading F.C. players (1–24 appearances) =

Reading Football Club, established in 1871, is an association football club based in Reading.

== Key ==
- The list is currently updated to include all players who have joined the club since 1991. Those who joined before that date still need to be added.
- The list is sorted by the year the player joined the club. If more than one player joined in the same year then they are sorted alphabetically.

Player

- Players listed in italics spent their entire career with the club on loan.

Club years

- Counted as the years the player signed for, and left the club.

Appearances

- League and total appearances are sourced to Royals Record from 1991–92 to 1995–96, and Soccerbase from 1996–97 onwards.

Academy graduate
Current Reading player
Current Reading player and academy graduate
Played for Reading on loan

International career

- Players who made international appearances only have the highest level at which they played listed.
- A player's senior international team is sourced to National Football Teams whilst appearances at age group level are sourced to the Association of Football Statisticians. Players not covered by the above are sourced as needed in the "Refs" column.

== Players with fewer than 25 appearances ==
As of match played 14 November 2026

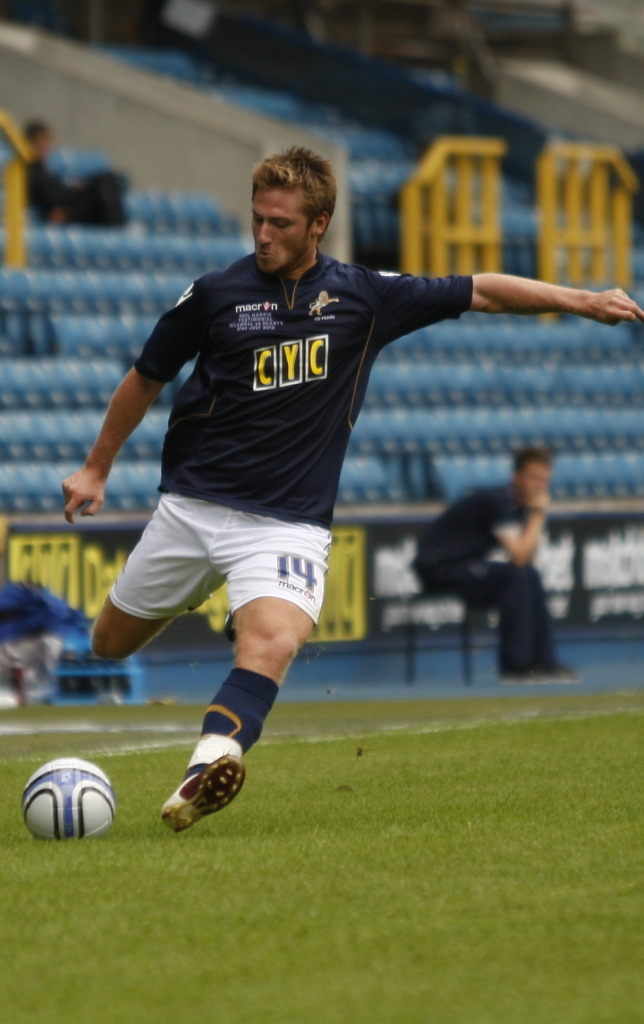
James Henry, one of 24 players to have come through the Academy at Reading and gone on to play for the first-team since 1999.

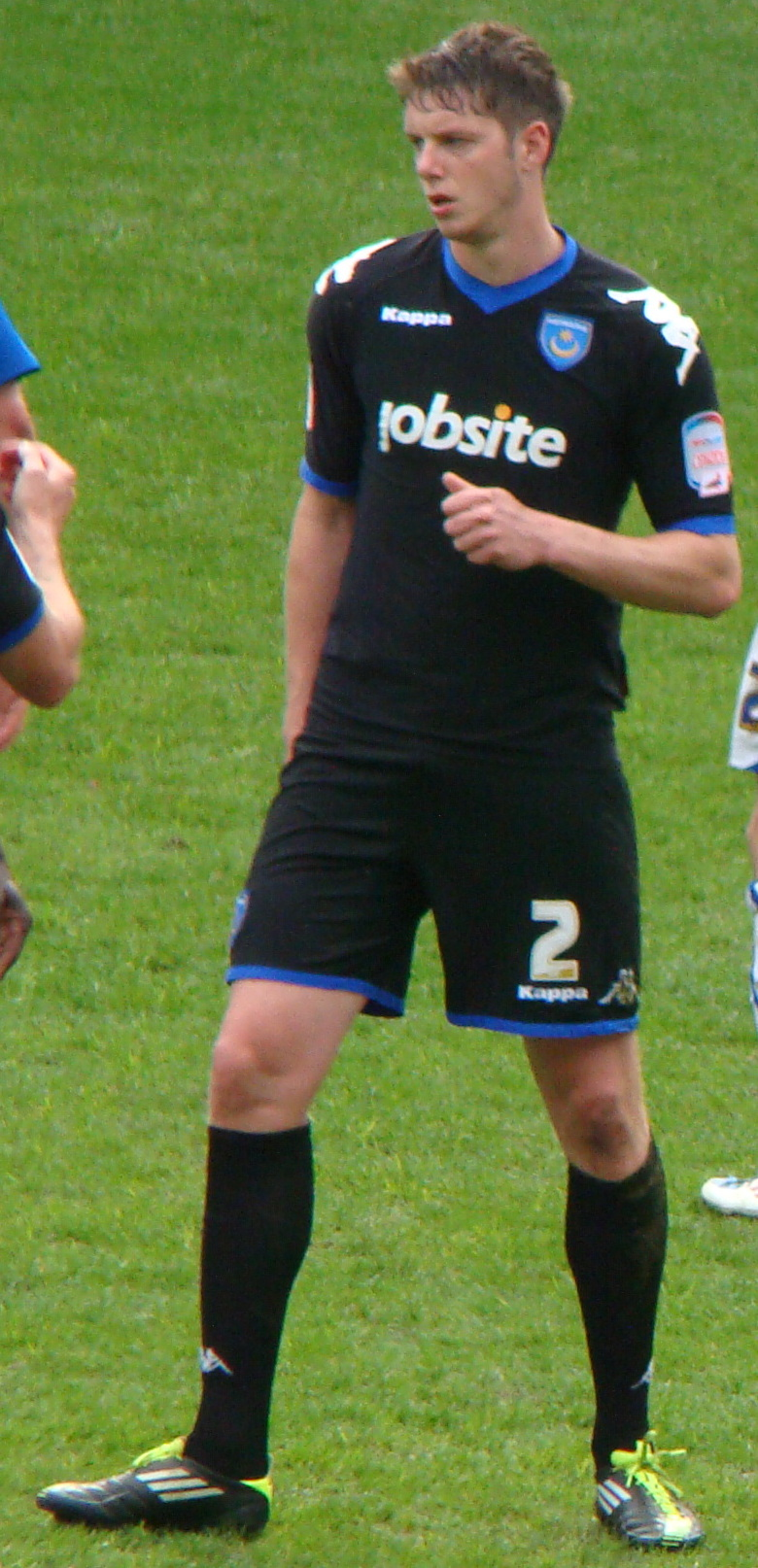
Greg Halford played just three times for Reading despite signing for a then club-record fee in excess of £2.25m.

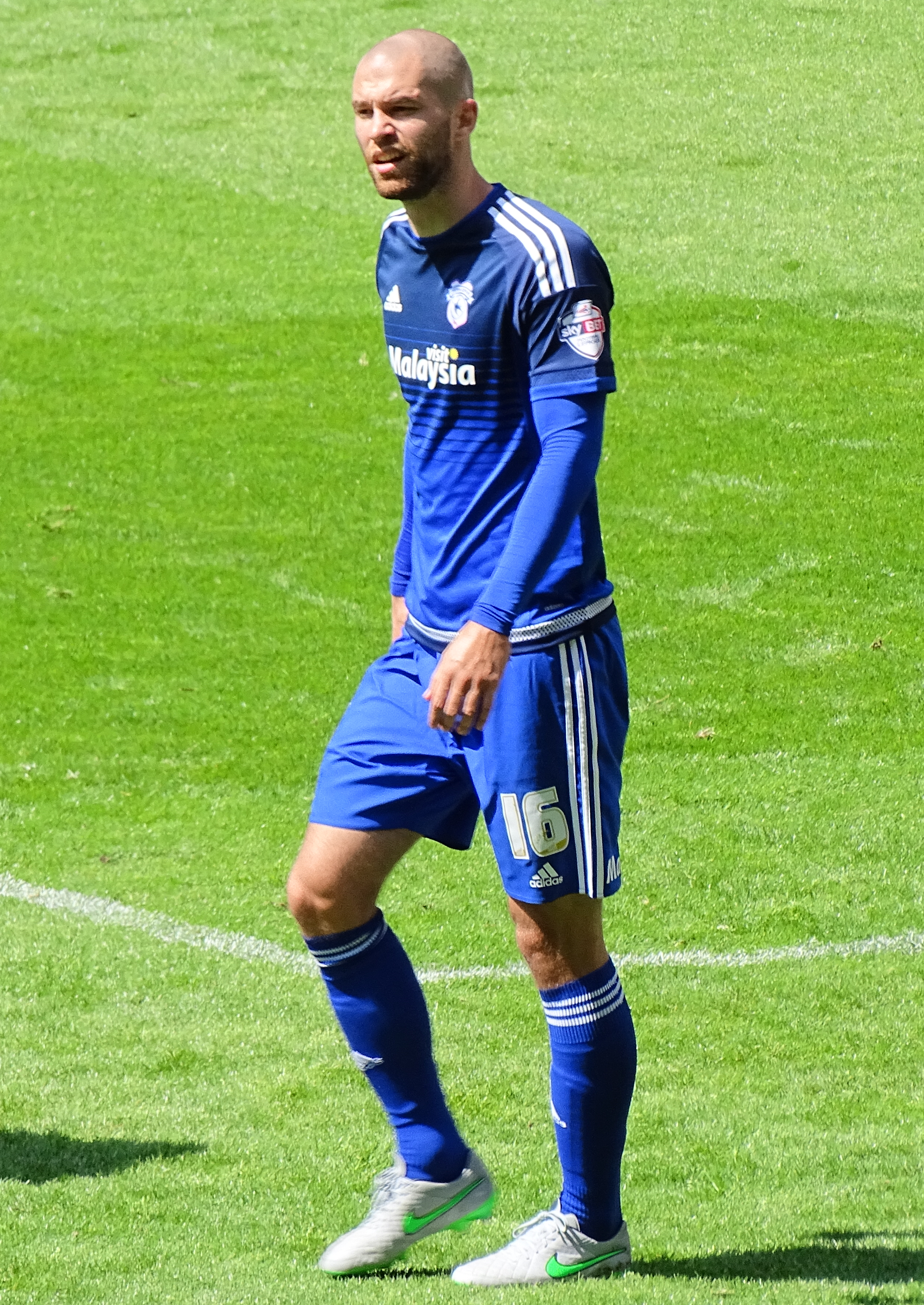
Matthew Connolly was part of three successive Championship winning sides between 2011 and 2013 with QPR, Reading and Cardiff City.

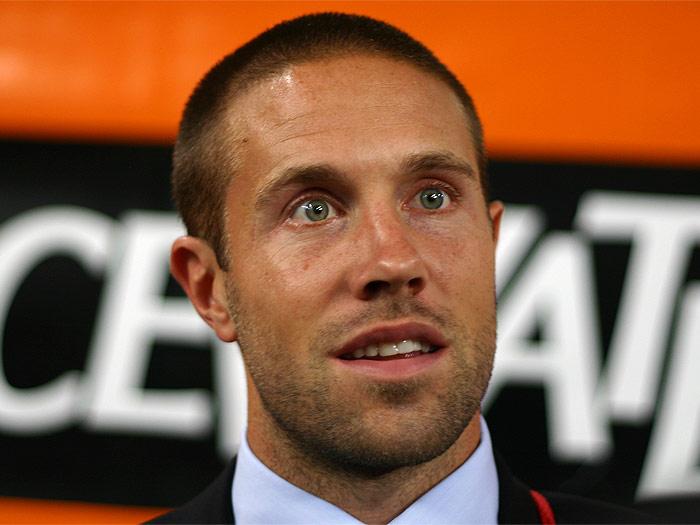
Part of a defence that kept seven consecutive clean sheets, Matthew Upson was hailed by then assistant manager Kevin Dillon as "the best loan signing this club has had".

Name	Years	League apps	League goals	Cup apps	Cup goals	League Cup apps	League Cup goals	EFL Trophy apps	EFL Trophy goals	Other apps (Note: Includes Promotion play-offs)	Other goals	Total apps	Total goals	International Career
Neale Cooper	1990–1991	7	0	0	2	0	0	0	0	-	-	9	0	—
Garry Brooke	1991	4	0	0	0	0	0	-	-	-	-	4	0	—
David Byrne	1991	7	2	0	0	0	0	-	-	-	-	7	2	—
Allan Cockram	1991	6	1	1	0	0	0	1	0	-	-	8	1	—
Steve Morrow	1991	3	0	0	0	0	0	-	-	-	-	3	0	Northern Ireland
Brian Statham	1991	8	0	0	0	0	0	-	-	-	-	8	0	England U21
Jim Leighton	1991–1992	8	0	3	0	0	0	0	0	-	-	11	0	Scotland
Nathan Fealey	1991–1992	1	0	0	0	0	0	-	-	-	-	1	0	—
Danny Honey	1991–1992	0	0	1	0	0	0	-	-	-	-	1	0	—
Aaron Giamettei	1991–1992	2	0	0	0	0	0	-	-	-	-	2	0	—
Andy Gray	1991–1994	17	3	0	0	1	1	2	0	-	-	20	4	—
Lea Barkus	1991–1995	15	1	1	0	0	0	1	0	-	-	17	1	—
David Bass	1991–1997	11	0	0	0	0	0	0	0	-	-	11	0	—
Steve Archibald	1992	1	0	0	0	0	0	-	-	-	-	1	0	Scotland
Gerry Britton	1992	2	0	2	0	0	0	0	0	-	-	4	0	—
John Keeley	1992	6	0	0	0	0	0	0	0	-	-	6	0	—
Darren Jackson	1992–1993	5	0	0	0	0	0	1	0	-	-	6	0	—
David Lee	1992	5	5	0	0	0	0	0	0	-	-	5	5	England U21
Darren McCance	1992–1994	1	0	0	0	0	0	1	0	-	-	2	0	—
Paul Moody	1992–1993	5	1	0	0	0	0	1	0	-	-	6	1	—
David Robinson	1992	8	0	0	0	0	0	0	0	-	-	8	0	—
Alan Carey	1993–1997	3	0	0	0	0	0	0	0	-	-	3	0	—
John Humphrey	1993–1994	8	0	0	0	0	0	1	0	-	-	9	0	—
David McDonald	1993	11	0	0	0	0	0	0	0	-	-	11	0	Republic of Ireland B
Darren Barnard	1994	4	0	0	0	0	0	0	0	-	-	4	0	Wales
Mick Murphy	1994–1996	1	0	0	0	0	0	-	-	0	0	1	0	—
Ray Wallace	1994	3	0	0	0	0	0	0	0	-	-	3	0	England U21
Tony Witter	1994	4	0	0	0	0	0	0	0	-	-	4	0	—
Kenny Brown	1995–1996	17	1	0	0	3	0	-	-	-	-	20	1	—
Robert Codner	1995	4	0	0	0	1	0	-	-	-	-	5	0	England C
Andy Freeman	1995–1997	1	0	0	0	0	0	-	-	-	-	1	0	—
Neville Gordon	1995–1996	1	0	0	0	0	0	-	-	-	-	1	0	—
Simon Sheppard	1995–1996	18	0	0	0	4	0	-	-	-	-	22	0	—
Michael Thorpe	1995–1998	5	0	2	0	2	0	-	-	-	-	9	0	—
Chris Woods	1996	5	0	0	0	0	0	-	-	-	-	5	0	England
Sal Bibbo	1996–1998	7	0	2	0	0	0	0	0	-	-	9	0	—
Eric Nixon	1996	0	0	0	0	1	0	-	-	-	-	1	0	—
Neville Roach	1996–1999	16	1	1	0	5	1	1	0	-	-	23	2	—
Ben Smith	1996–1998	1	0	0	0	0	0	-	-	-	-	1	0	—
Steve Sutton	1996	2	0	0	0	0	0	-	-	-	-	2	0	—
Tommy Wright	1996	17	0	0	0	0	0	-	-	-	-	17	0	Northern Ireland
Steve Blatherwick	1997	7	0	0	0	0	0	-	-	-	-	7	0	—
Jason Bowen	1997–1999	15	1	5	0	2	0	0	0	-	-	22	1	Wales
Gareth Davies	1997–1999	19	0	3	0	1	0	0	0	-	-	23	0	Wales U21
Mark Robins	1997	5	0	0	0	0	0	-	-	-	-	5	0	England U21
Lee Sandford	1997	5	0	0	0	0	0	-	-	-	-	5	0	—
Jamie Ashdown	1998–2004	13	0	1	0	0	0	2	0	-	-	16	0	—
Neil Clement	1998–1999	11	1	0	0	0	0	1	0	-	-	12	1	England U18
Nick Colgan	1998	5	0	0	0	0	0	-	-	-	-	5	0	—
Robert Fleck	1998–1999	9	1	0	0	1	0	0	0	-	-	10	1	Scotland
Phil Hadland	1998–2000	0	0	0	0	1	0	0	0	-	-	1	0	—
Paddy Kelly	1998	3	0	0	0	0	0	0	0	-	-	3	0	—
Michael O'Neill	1998	9	1	0	0	0	0	0	0	-	-	9	1	Northern Ireland
Elroy Kromheer	1998–1999	11	0	0	0	1	0	0	0	-	-	12	0	—
Andy Legg	1998	12	0	0	0	1	0	0	0	-	-	13	0	Wales
Michael O'Neill	1998	9	1	0	0	0	0	0	0	-	-	9	1	Northern Ireland
John Polston	1998–2001	18	1	4	0	1	0	1	0	-	-	24	1	—
Mark Reilly	1998	6	0	0	0	2	0	0	0	-	-	8	0	Scotland B
Neville Stamp	1998–2000	1	0	0	0	0	0	0	0	-	-	1	0	—
Peter van der Kwaak	1998–1999	4	0	0	0	1	0	0	0	-	-	5	0	—
Andy Wright	1998	2	0	0	0	0	0	1	0	-	-	3	0	—
Tony Barras	1999	6	1	0	0	0	0	0	0	-	-	6	1	—
Mark Bowen	1999	0	0	0	0	0	0	1	0	-	-	1	0	Wales
Alex Haddow	1999–2001	3	0	0	0	1	0	-	-	-	-	4	0	—
Kevin Lisbie	1999	2	0	0	0	0	0	0	0	-	-	2	0	—
Alan Maybury	1999	8	0	0	0	0	0	0	0	-	-	8	0	Republic of Ireland
Mark McKeever	1999	7	2	0	0	0	0	0	0	-	-	7	2	Republic of Ireland U21
Andy McLaren	1999–2000	9	1	0	0	2	0	-	-	-	-	11	1	Scotland U21
Mark Nicholls	1999–2000	5	1	0	0	0	0	2	2	-	-	7	3	—
Graham Potter	1999	4	0	0	0	0	0	1	0	-	-	5	0	England U21
Tony Thorpe	1999	6	1	0	0	0	0	-	-	-	-	6	1	—
Joe Gamble	2000–2004	7	0	2	0	2	0	2	0	0	0	13	0	Republic of Ireland
Alex Smith	2001–2003	14	2	1	0	2	1	1	0	-	-	18	3	—
Michael Branch	2002	2	0	0	0	0	0	-	-	-	-	2	0	England U21
Ben Roberts	2002	6	0	0	0	0	0	-	-	-	-	6	0	England U21
Leo Roget	2002	1	0	0	0	0	0	-	-	-	-	1	0	—
Bas Savage	2002–2005	16	0	1	0	1	0	-	-	-	-	18	0	—
Matthew Upson	2002	14	0	0	0	1	1	-	-	-	-	15	1	England
Jamie Young	2003–2006	1	0	0	0	0	0	-	-	-	-	1	0	England U20
Darren Campbell	2003–2005	1	0	0	0	0	0	-	-	-	-	1	0	England U17; Scotland U17
Peter Castle	2003–2006	1	0	0	0	0	0	-	-	-	-	1	0	Republic of Ireland U18
Luke Chadwick	2003	15	1	0	0	0	0	-	-	2	0	17	1	England U21
Omar Daley	2003–2004	6	0	0	0	1	0	-	-	-	-	7	0	Jamaica
Dean Gordon	2004	3	0	0	0	0	0	-	-	-	-	3	0	England U21
Sekou Baradji	2005	1	0	0	0	2	0	-	-	-	-	3	0	—
Eric Obinna	2005–2006	6	0	0	0	2	0	-	-	-	-	8	0	—
Michael Dobson	2005–2006	1	0	0	0	0	0	-	-	-	-	1	0	—
Les Ferdinand	2005	12	1	2	0	0	0	-	-	-	-	14	1	England
Martin Keown	2005	5	0	0	0	0	0	-	-	-	-	5	0	England
Chris Makin	2005–2006	12	0	4	0	3	0	-	-	-	-	19	0	England U21
Curtis Osano	2005–2008	0	0	2	0	0	0	-	-	-	-	2	0	—
Graham Stack	2005–2006, 2006–2008	1	0	4	0	5	0	-	-	-	-	10	0	Republic of Ireland U21
Scott Davies	2006–2011	4	0	0	0	1	0	-	-	-	-	5	0	Republic of Ireland U21
Scott Golbourne	2006–2009	2	0	1	0	3	0	-	-	-	-	6	0	England U19
John Halls	2006–2008	2	1	2	0	4	1	-	-	-	-	8	2	England U20
Ben Hamer	2006–2011	0	0	1	0	4	0	-	-	-	-	5	0	—
James Henry	2006–2010	10	0	2	0	6	4	-	-	-	-	18	4	England U19
Péter Máté	2006–2008	0	0	0	0	1	1	-	-	-	-	1	1	Hungary U21
Sam Sodje	2006–2009	3	0	3	1	2	0	-	-	-	-	8	1	Nigeria
Mikkel Andersen	2007–2015	3	0	1	0	1	0	-	-	-	-	5	0	Denmark U21
Emerse Faé	2007–2009	8	0	1	0	2	0	-	-	-	-	11	0	Ivory Coast
Greg Halford	2007	3	0	0	0	0	0	-	-	-	-	3	0	England U20
Nicholas Bignall	2008–2013	1	0	0	0	3	2	-	-	-	-	4	2	—
Julian Kelly	2008–2011	7	0	1	0	5	0	-	-	-	-	13	0	—
Dave Mooney	2008–2011	0	0	0	0	2	0	-	-	-	-	2	0	Republic of Ireland U23
Dan Harding	2009	3	0	0	0	0	0	-	-	2	0	5	0	England U21
Darren O'Dea	2009	8	0	0	0	0	0	-	-	-	-	8	0	Republic of Ireland
Lawson D'Ath	2010–2014	0	0	1	0	0	0	-	-	-	-	1	0	—
Gunnar Thorvaldsson	2010	4	0	1	0	0	0	-	-	-	-	5	0	Iceland
Marcus Williams	2010–2012	3	0	0	0	2	0	-	-	-	-	5	0	—
Bongani Khumalo	2011–2012	4	0	0	0	1	0	-	-	-	-	5	0	South Africa
Joseph Mills	2011–2013	15	0	0	0	1	0	-	-	-	-	16 (Note: Soccerbase incorrectly credits Jack Mills with two appearances against Hull City and Charlton Athletic on 23 and 27 August 2011 respectively, that should instead be attributed to Joseph Mills as confirmed by the official match reports on the Reading website.)	0	England U18
Benik Afobe	2012	3	0	0	0	0	0	-	-	-	-	3	0	England U21
Matthew Connolly	2012	6	0	0	0	0	0	-	-	-	-	6	0	—
Tomasz Cywka	2012	4	0	0	0	0	0	-	-	-	-	4	0	Poland U21
Ryan Edwards	2012–2015	7	0	0	0	3	0	-	-	-	-	10	0	Australia U23
Hayden Mullins	2012	7	0	0	0	0	0	-	-	-	-	7	0	England U21
Dominic Samuel	2012–2017	11	2	2	0	3	0	-	-	-	-	16	2	England U19
Stuart Taylor	2012–2014	4	0	0	0	0	0	-	-	-	-	4	0	England U21
Chris Baird	2013–2014	9	0	0	0	0	0	-	-	-	-	9	0	Northern Ireland
Wayne Bridge	2013–2014	12	0	0	0	0	0	-	-	-	-	12	0	England
Daniel Carriço	2013–2014	3	0	0	0	0	0	-	-	-	-	3	0	Portugal U21
Royston Drenthe	2013–2015	23	2	1	0	0	0	-	-	-	-	24	2	Netherlands
Billy Sharp	2013–2014	10	2	0	0	0	0	-	-	-	-	10	2	—
Sean Long	2013–2017	0	0	0	0	1	0	-	-	-	-	1	0	Republic of Ireland U21
Craig Tanner	2013–2017	3	0	0	0	2	1	-	-	-	-	5	1	England U16
Aaron Tshibola	2013–2016	13	0	1	0	3	0	-	-	-	-	17	0	England U18
Aaron Kuhl	2014–2017	6	0	0	0	2	0	-	-	-	-	8	0	England U20
Glenn Murray	2014	18	8	0	0	0	0	-	-	-	-	18	8	—
Jack Stacey	2014–2017	6	0	0	0	0	0	-	-	-	-	6	0	—
Yakubu	2015	7	0	4	1	0	0	-	-	-	-	11	1	Nigeria
Nathan Aké	2015	5	0	0	0	0	0	-	-	-	-	5	0	Netherlands U21
Kwesi Appiah	2015	6	1	0	0	0	0	-	-	-	-	6	1	Ghana
Nathaniel Chalobah	2015	15	1	5	0	0	0	-	-	-	-	20	1	England U21
Jure Travner	2015	1	0	0	0	0	0	-	-	-	-	1	0	Slovenia U21
Josh Barrett	2015–2020	10	0	0	0	3	2	-	-	-	-	13	2	Republic of Ireland U21
Jonathan Bond	2015–2018	14	0	0	0	0	0	-	-	-	-	14	0	England U21
Álex Fernández	2015–2016	8	0	1	1	1	0	-	-	-	-	10	1	Spain U20
Paolo Hurtado	2015–2017	5	0	0	0	1	0	-	-	-	-	6	0	Peru
Rowan Liburd	2015–2016	3	0	0	0	0	0	-	-	-	-	3	0	—
Orlando Sá	2015–2016	19	5	1	0	1	0	-	-	-	-	21	5	Portugal
Andrew Taylor	2015–2016	19	0	2	0	2	0	-	-	-	-	23	0	England U21
Tennai Watson	2015–2021	4	0	0	0	5	0	-	-	-	-	9	0	—
Danzell Gravenberch	2016–2019	2	0	0	0	3	0	-	-	-	-	5	0	Netherlands U19
Joseph Mendes	2016–2018	15	3	0	0	3	0	-	-	2	0	20	3	—
Deniss Rakels	2016–2018	14	3	2	0	1	0	-	-	-	-	17	3	Latvia
Lewis Grabban	2017	16	3	0	0	0	0	-	-	3	0	9	1	—
Jordon Mutch	2017	9	1	0	0	0	0	-	-	0	0	9	1	England U21
Reece Oxford	2017	5	0	0	0	0	0	-	-	0	0	5	0	England U20
Adrian Popa	2017–2020	15	1	0	0	2	0	-	-	-	-	17	1	Romania
Sam Walker	2018–2021	7	0	4	0	3	0	-	-	-	-	14	0	—
Gabriel Osho	2016–2020	7	0	2	0	1	0	-	-	-	-	10	0	—
Felipe Araruna	2020–2022	6	0	1	0	2	0	-	-	-	-	9	0	—
Ryan East	2016–2021	1	0	0	0	0	0	-	-	-	-	1	0	—
Lucas Boyé	2019–2020	19	0	2	1	3	1	-	-	-	-	24	2	—
Ayub Masika	2020	5	0	1	0	0	0	-	-	-	-	6	0	Kenya
Marc McNulty	2018–2022	13	1	0	0	4	0	-	-	-	-	17	1	Scotland
Ethan Bristow	2018–2022	6	0	2	0	3	0	-	-	-	-	11	0	—
Dejan Tetek	2019–2023	17	0	2	0	2	0	-	-	-	-	21	0	Serbia U21
Nahum Melvin-Lambert	2019–2023	0	0	1	0	2	0	-	-	-	-	3	0	Saint Lucia
Lynford Sackey	2019–2022	0	0	0	0	2	0	-	-	-	-	2	0	England U16
Lewis Gibson	2020–2021	13	0	0	0	0	0	-	-	-	-	13	0	England U20
Jayden Onen	2020–2021	1	0	1	0	0	0	-	-	-	-	2	0	—
Oliver Pendlebury	2019–2021	0	0	1	0	0	0	-	-	-	-	1	0	England U16
Conor Lawless	2019–2021	0	0	1	0	0	0	-	-	-	-	1	0	—
Claudio Osorio	2021–2023	0	0	1	0	1	0	-	-	-	-	2	0	England U16
Kian Leavy	2021–2023	0	0	0	0	2	0	-	-	-	-	2	0	Republic of Ireland U21
Michael Stickland	2021–2026	10	0	2	0	4	0	5	0	-	-	21	0	—
Jahmari Clarke	2021–2024	12	2	0	0	2	0	0	0	-	-	14	2	Jamaica U20
Alen Halilović	2021–2022	11	1	1	0	0	0	0	0	-	-	12	1	Croatia
Tyrell Ashcroft	2021–2022	4	0	0	0	0	0	0	0	-	-	4	0	—
Louie Holzman	2021–2025	9	0	4	0	1	0	3	0	-	-	17	0	—
Karl Hein	2022	5	0	0	0	0	0	0	0	-	-	5	0	Estonia
Brandon Barker	2022	4	0	0	0	0	0	0	0	-	-	4	0	England U20
Ørjan Nyland	2022	10	0	0	0	0	0	0	0	-	-	10	0	Norway
Terell Thomas	2022	2	0	0	0	0	0	0	0	-	-	2	0	Saint Lucia
Rashawn Scott	2022–2023	1	0	0	0	0	0	0	0	-	-	1	0	—
John Clarke	2022–2026	3	0	0	0	1	0	0	0	-	-	4	0	Republic of Ireland U19
Dean Bouzanis	2022–2025	6	0	2	0	1	0	0	0	-	-	9	0	Australia U23
Basil Tuma	2022–2026	7	0	3	0	3	0	2	0	-	-	15	0	Malta
Cesare Casadei	2023	15	1	0	0	0	0	0	0	-	-	15	1	Italy U21
Coniah Boyce-Clarke	2019–2025	2	0	0	0	3	0	2	0	-	-	7	0	Jamaica
Jack Senga	2022–2025	1	0	1	0	1	0	2	0	-	-	5	3	Belgium U15
Caylan Vickers	2023–2024	14	1	1	0	2	0	5	2	-	-	22	3	—
Matthew Carson	2023–2024	10	0	2	0	2	0	3	0	-	-	17	0	—
Dom Ballard	2023–2024	10	3	1	0	0	0	1	0	-	-	12	3	England U20
Taylan Harris	2023–2024	0	0	0	0	0	0	1	1	-	-	1	1	—
Tom Norcott	2023–Present	0	0	0	0	0	0	2	0	-	-	2	0	—
Charlie Wellens	2023–2025	0	0	0	0	0	0	3	0	-	-	3	1	—
Zane Monlouis	2024	1	0	0	0	0	0	0	0	-	-	1	0	England U17
Emmanuel Osho	2022–Present	3	0	2	0	1	0	6	0	-	-	12	0	—
Adrian Akande	2022–2025	15	0	2	1	1	0	3	0	-	-	21	1	—
Abraham Kanu	2024–Present	10	0	2	0	1	0	3	0	-	-	16	0	Sierra Leone U20
Shay Spencer	2024–Present	1	0	1	0	1	0	6	0	-	-	9	0	—
Tyler Sackey	2024–Present	0	0	1	0	0	0	8	2	-	-	9	2	—
Joseph Barough	2023–Present	0	0	0	0	0	0	3	0	-	-	3	0	—
Boyd Beacroft	2021–Present	0	0	0	0	0	0	5	0	-	-	5	0	—
Jeremiah Okine-Peters	2024–2026	0	0	0	0	1	0	4	1	-	-	5	1	—
Billy Bodin	2025	16	2	0	0	0	0	0	0	-	-	16	2	Wales
Tom Carroll	2025	9	0	0	0	0	0	0	0	-	-	9	0	England U21
Mark O'Mahony	2025–2026	16	0	1	1	3	0	1	1	-	-	21	2	Republic of Ireland U21
Matty Jacob	2025–2026	14	0	1	0	1	0	0	0	-	-	16	0	—
Jack Stevens	2025–Present	3	0	1	0	3	0	6	0	-	-	13	0	—
John Ryan	2023–Present	0	0	0	0	3	0	3	0	-	-	6	0	Republic of Ireland U19
Derrick Williams	2025–2026	24	0	0	0	0	0	0	0	-	-	24	0	Republic of Ireland
Jacob Borgnis	2021–2026	0	0	0	0	0	0	3	1	-	-	3	1	—
Reece Evans	2025–Present	0	0	0	0	0	0	2	0	-	-	2	0	Zimbabwe U23
Philip Duah	2024–Present	0	0	0	0	0	0	4	0	-	-	4	0	—
Sean Patton	2025–Present	6	0	0	0	0	0	3	2	-	-	9	2	Republic of Ireland U21
Will Keane	2026	14	2	0	0	0	0	0	0	-	-	14	2	Republic of Ireland
Ryan Nyambe	2026	19	0	0	0	0	0	0	0	-	-	19	0	Namibia
Benn Ward	2026–Present	17	1	0	0	2	0	0	0	-	-	19	1	—
Kadan Young	2026	7	0	0	0	0	0	0	0	-	-	7	0	England U19
Luke Howard	2025–Present	1	0	0	0	0	0	3	0	-	-	4	0	—
Udoka Godwin-Malife	2026–Present	15	1	1	0	1	0	0	0	-	-	17	1	—
Kyreece Lisbie	2026–Present	15	5	1	0	3	0	0	0	-	-	19	5	—
Josh Stokes	2026–Present	11	0	0	0	2	1	0	0	-	-	13	1	—
Jacob Brown	2026–Present	14	4	0	0	3	1	2	0	-	-	19	5	Scotland
Jerae Jones	2026–Present	1	0	0	0	0	0	3	1	-	-	4	1	—
George Earthy	2026–Present	5	2	0	0	2	0	0	0	-	-	7	2	England U21
Conor Masterson	2026–Present	2	0	1	0	2	0	1	0	-	-	6	0	Republic of Ireland U21
Jamie Reid	2026–Present	11	0	1	2	1	0	0	0	-	-	13	2	Northern Ireland
Josh Knight	2026–Present	2	0	1	0	0	0	1	0	-	-	4	0	—
David Hicks	2025–Present	0	0	0	0	0	0	1	0	-	-	1	0	—
Callum Cliff	2026–Present	0	0	0	0	0	0	1	0	-	-	1	0	—
Kevin Mfuamba	2026–Present	0	0	0	0	0	0	1	0	-	-	1	0	—
Scofield Lonmeni-Dekam	2026–Present	0	0	0	0	0	0	1	0	-	-	1	0	—
Matteo Dashi	2026–Present	0	0	0	0	0	0	1	0	-	-	1	0	—
Torin Ntege	2026–Present	0	0	0	0	0	0	1	0	-	-	1	0	—
