= Felipe Araruna =

Brazilian footballer (born 1996)

Personal information
- Full name: Felipe Araruna Hoffmann
- Date of birth: 12 March 1996 (age 30)
- Place of birth: Porto Alegre, Brazil
- Height: 1.75 m (5 ft 9 in)
- Position: Defensive midfielder

Youth career
- 2009–2016: São Paulo

Senior career*
Years	Team	Apps	(Gls)
2017–2020	São Paulo	19	(0)
2019	→ Fortaleza (loan)	9	(0)
2020–2022	Reading	6	(0)
- * Club domestic league appearances and goals as of 20 May 2022 (UTC)

Felipe Araruna Hoffmann (born 12 March 1996), known as Felipe Araruna, is a Brazilian professional footballer. Mainly a defensive midfielder, he can also play as a right-back.

== Career ==
In December 2016, Felipe Araruna, of the U-20 multi-player team, caught the attention of Rogério Ceni and was promoted to the professional team of São Paulo FC.

=== Reading ===
On 30 January 2020, Araruna signed for EFL Championship club Reading on a contract until the summer of 2022.

During Reading's FA Cup tie against Kidderminster Harriers on 8 January 2022, Araruna came on as a 59th minute substitute for Dejan Tetek, dislocating his knee in the first passage of play after his substitution and had to be replaced by Michael Stickland. On 20 May 2022, Reading confirmed that Araruna would leave the club upon the expiration of his contract.

== Career statistics ==
As of match played 8 January 2022

Appearances and goals by club, season and competition
Club	Season	League			State League		National cup		League cup		Other		Total	
Club	Season	Division	Apps	Goals	Apps	Goals	Apps	Goals	Apps	Goals	Apps	Goals	Apps	Goals
São Paulo	2016	Brasileiro Série A	0	0	0	0	0	0	—		11 (Note: Appearances in Copa Paulista)	0	11	0
São Paulo	2017	Brasileiro Série A	8	0	11 (Note: Appearances in Campeonato Paulista)	0	3	0	—		1 (Note: Appearances in Copa Sudamericana)	0	23	0
São Paulo	2018	Brasileiro Série A	11	0	2	0	1	0	—		1	0	15	0
São Paulo	2019	Brasileiro Série A	0	0	2	0	0	0	—		1 (Note: Appearances in Copa Libertadores)	0	3	0
São Paulo	Total		19	0	15	0	4	0	—		14	0	52	0
Fortaleza (loan)	2019	Brasileiro Série A	9	0	3 (Note: Appearances in Campeonato Cearense)	0	2	0	—		7 (Note: Appearances in Copa do Nordeste)	0	21	0
Reading	2019–20	EFL Championship	3	0	—		0	0	0	0	—		3	0
Reading	2020–21	EFL Championship	2	0	—		0	0	2	0	—		4	0
Reading	2021–22	EFL Championship	1	0	—		1	0	0	0	—		2	0
Reading	Total		6	0	0	0	1	0	2	0	0	0	9	0
Career total			34	0	18	0	7	0	2	0	21	0	82	0

== Honours ==
Fortaleza

- Campeonato Cearense: 2019
