= 2021–22 Reading F.C. season =

Reading
2021–22 season
- Owner: Dai Yongge and Dai Xiuli (majority)
- Manager: Veljko Paunović (until 19 February); Marko Mitrović (Rounds 16 & 17); Paul Ince and Michael Gilkes (interim, from 19 February)
- Stadium: Madejski Stadium
- EFL Championship: 21st
- FA Cup: Third round (eliminated by Kidderminster Harriers)
- EFL Cup: First round (eliminated by Swansea City)
- Top goalscorer: League: John Swift (11); All: John Swift (11)
- Highest home attendance: 22,692 vs Coventry City, 12 February 2022
- Lowest home attendance: 4,989 vs Swansea City, 10 August 2021
- Average home league attendance: 12,852
Home colours	Away colours

The 2021–22 season was Reading's 151st year in existence and ninth consecutive season in the Championship, and covered the period from 1 July 2021 to 30 June 2022.

== Season review ==
=== Pre-season ===
On 24 June 2021, the 2021–22 season EFL Championship fixture list was released, with Reading beginning their campaign away at Stoke City, and finishing the season away to Luton Town. Later on the same day, Reading were drawn at home to Swansea City in the First Round of the 2021–22 EFL Cup.

On 15 July, Readings proposed friendly against Aberdeen scheduled for Friday 16 July, was cancelled after two members of staff and one player returned positive COVID-19 tests.

On 16 July, the Madejski Stadium's naming rights were sold to title sponsors Select Car Leasing in a 10-year deal, with the stadium being renamed the 'Select Car Leasing Stadium'.

==== Transfers and contracts ====
On 25 May 2021, Reading announced that they had activated a clause in Thierry Nevers' contract, extending his contract until the summer of 2022 whilst also confirming he would be joining West Ham United for an undisclosed fee once the transfer window opens on 9 June 2021.

On 29 June, Reading announced that Tom McIntyre had signed a new contract with the club, until the summer of 2024.

On 2 July, Reading announced that they had signed new one-year contracts with youngsters, Femi Azeez and James Holden, whilst Lynford Sackey, Kelvin Ehibhatiomhan, Harvey Collins, Kian Leavy and Malachi Talent-Aryeetey all signed their first professional contracts with the club.

On 8 July, Reading confirmed that Michael Olise had left the club to sign for Crystal Palace for a record fee received by the club. On the same day, young goalkeeper Coniah Boyce-Clarke joined Bath City to train with and feature in the forthcoming pre-season games. On 13 July, Reading confirmed that Jökull Andrésson was currently training with Morecambe with permission to feature in two of their pre-season friendlies.

On 20 July, Under-23 goalkeeper James Holden, joined Maidenhead United on a season-long loan deal.

On 23 July, Jökull Andrésson signed a new three-year contract with the club, before moving to Morecambe on a season-long loan deal.

On 28 July, Nahum Melvin-Lambert returned to St Patrick's Athletic on loan for the second half of the 2021 League of Ireland Premier Division season.

=== August ===
On 12 August, Tom Dele-Bashiru joined Reading on a season-long loan deal from Watford. The following day, 13 August, Reading announced that Marc McNulty had returned to Dundee United on loan for the season.

On 19 August, Reading announced the signing of Junior Hoilett to a one-year contract. The following day, 20 August, Jeriel Dorsett joined Rochdale on a season-long loan deal. On the same day, young academy defender Jack Senga joined Maidenhead United on a work experience loan deal.

On 27 August, Reading announced the signing of Alen Halilović to a one-year contract after he'd left Birmingham City in the summer, and the season-long loan signing of Baba Rahman Chelsea.

On 30 August, Reading announced the signing of Scott Dann to a one-year contract, after he'd left Crystal Palace in the summer, whilst Danny Drinkwater join on a season-long loan from Chelsea later in the same day.

=== October ===
On 21 October, Reading announced that they had signed former Chelsea youth team player Rashawn Scott to their Under-23 team until the end of the season, whilst Academy Graduate Michael Stickland had committed to signing his first professional contract with the club come the completion of his scholarship in the summer.

=== November ===
On 1 November, manager Veljko Paunović tested positive for COVID-19, resulting in him isolating and assistant manager Marko Mitrović taking charger of the first team for their trip to Millwall on 2 November and Birmingham City on 6 November.

On 15 November, Reading announced the signing of Andy Carroll on a short-term contract until mid-January 2022.

On 17 November, Reading accepted a six-point penalty deduction from the EFL, dropping them from 16th to 19th, for breaking the EFL's Profit and Sustainability limits, with a further six-points suspended until the 2022–23 season.

On 19 November, Coniah Boyce-Clarke joined St Albans City on an initial one-month youth loan.

=== December ===
On 6 December, Reading were drawn away to Kidderminster Harriers in the Third Round of the 2021–22 FA Cup.

On 15 December, Reading's match against Luton Town scheduled for 18 December, was postponed due to positive COVID-19 cases within the First Team and Under-23 squads. Six days later, 21 December, Reading's away game at Peterborough United scheduled for 26 December, was also postponed due to COVID-19 within the First Team and Under-23 squads. On 27 December, Readings home match against Fulham was also cancelled due to the COVID-19 situation at the club.

On 29 December, Reading announced that their postponed trip to Peterborough United had been rescheduled for 15 February 2022. The following day, Reading confirmed their postponed match against Fulham would be played on 11 January 2022, and on 31 December, Reading confirmed that their postponed match against Luton Town had been rescheduled for 19 January 2022.

=== January ===
On 8 January, Reading suffered a shock 2–1 defeat to National League North side Kidderminster Harriers in the FA Cup.

On 10 January, Readings home match against Stoke City, scheduled for 15 February, was postponed due to Stoke City progressing to the Fourth Round of the FA Cup, and young goalkeepers Jökull Andrésson and James Holden were recalled from their loan spells with Morecambe and Maidenhead United.

On 15 January, Reading were defeat 2-1 by away at Middlesbrough, with Andy Carroll scoring the goal in what was he last appearance for the club, with his short-term contract ending the same day. Later the same day, Liam Moore was stripped of the Club Captaincy after stating his desire to leave the club.

On 17 January, Rafael Cabral left the club after his contract was terminated by mutual consent allowing him to return to Brazil.

On 24 January, Reading announced the signing of Karl Hein on loan from Arsenal until the end of the season. On 27 January, Reading announced that their postponed home fixture against Stoke City, originally scheduled for 15 February, had been rearranged for 5 April. On the same day, Reading's away trip to Peterborough United, scheduled for 15 February, had been pushed back 24hours after it was picked to be shown live on Sky Sports.

On 31 January, Transfer Deadline Day, George Pușcaș joined Pisa on loan for the remainder of the season, whilst Tom Ince joined Reading on loan for the remainder of the season from Stoke City, with Liam Moore going the opposite direction on loan for the same length.

=== February ===
On 15 February, Reading announced the signing of free agent Brandon Barker on a contract until the end of the season.

On 18 February, Harvey Collins joined Walton Casuals on a one-month youth loan deal.

Following Reading's 3-2 away victory over Preston North End, Veljko Paunović left his role as Manager by mutual consent, with Paul Ince being placed in interim charge of the club alongside Academy Manager Michael Gilkes.

On 22 February, Alex Rae was appointed interim Assistant Manager.

=== March ===
On 4 March, Scott Dann extended his contract with the club until the summer of 2023.

On 9 March, Paul Ince confirmed that Karl Hein had returned to Arsenal after a finger injury had ruled him out for the remainder of the season. The following day, Reading confirmed Hein's season ending injury, and announced the signing of free agent Ørjan Nyland on a short-term contract until the end of the season.

On 11 March, Lucas João was announced as the EFL Championship player of the month for February.

On 18 March, Coniah Boyce-Clarke joined Welling United on loan for the remainder of the season.

On 24 March, Reading announced the singing of Terell Thomas on a short-term contract until the end of the season. The following day Reading announced that Jack Senga and Kelvin Abrefa had signed their first professional contracts with the club, until the summer of 2024.

=== May ===
On 4 May, Reading hosted an end of season gala dinner, where Andy Yiadom was announced as the clubs Player of the Season.

On the final day of the season, whilst the first-team faced Luton Town at Kenilworth Road, Readings U23 team won the 2021–22 Berks & Bucks Senior Cup, defeating Ascot United with goals from Ajani Giscombe, Imari Samuels and a Nahum Melvin-Lambert brace.

On 16 May, Paul Ince was confirmed as Reading's permanent manager, with Mark Bowen also returning to the club as Head of Football Operations.

On 20 May, Reading confirmed that they had offered new contracts to Tom Holmes, Josh Laurent, Andy Rinomhota, Femi Azeez and Andy Yiadom, whilst also confirming the departure of loanees Danny Drinkwater, Tom Dele-Bashiru, Baba Rahman, Tom Ince and Karl Hein. Additionally the club confirmed that Terell Thomas, Brandon Barker, Ørjan Nyland, Felipe Araruna, Alen Halilović and Marc McNulty would leave the club upon the expiry of their contract at the end of June and the contract discussions where on going with Junior Hoilett, Michael Morrison and John Swift. Reading also offered new professional contracts to under-23 players Nelson Abbey, Jeriel Dorsett, Imari Samuels, Claudio Osorio, Kian Leavy, Rashawn Scott, Kelvin Ehibhatiomhan and Nahum Melvin-Lambert, and to under-18 players Mamadi Camara, Jahmari Clarke, Tyrell Ashcroft and Louie Holzman. Pro terms where also offered to Hamid Abdel Salam, Sam Paul, Matthew Rowley and Benjamin Purcell, with Ajani Giscombe, Harvey Maudner and David Nyarko also having their contracts extended for an additional year. The club also confirmed the departure of Ethan Bristow, James Holden, Lynford Sackey and Malachi Talent-Aryeetey while Jordan Addo-Antoine.

=== June ===
On 15 June, the EFL released the Retained List for each club, which confirmed contract renewals for Jahmari Clarke, Tyrell Ashcroft, Louie Holzman, Harvey Collins, Hamid Abdel-Salam, Sam Paul, Matt Rowley, Benjamin Purcell, Jeriel Dorsett and Kian Leavy.

On 17 June, Tom Holmes and Andy Yiadom both signed a new three-year contracts with Reading.

On 22 June, Reading confirmed that Michael Stickland, Louie Holzman, Kian Leavy and Jeriel Dorsett had all signed new contracts.

On 24 June, Reading announced that Mamadi Camará, Rashawn Scott, Nelson Abbey, Matt Rowley, Sam Paul, Benjamin Purcell and Claudio Osorio had all signed new contracts with the club for the 2022-23 season.

== Transfers ==
=== In ===
Date	Position	Nationality	Name	From	Fee	Ref.
19 August 2021	FW	(Canada)	Junior Hoilett	Unattached	Free	
27 August 2021	MF	(Croatia)	Alen Halilović	Unattached	Free	
30 August 2021	DF	(England)	Scott Dann	Unattached	Free	
21 October 2021	MF	(England)	Rashawn Scott	Unattached	Free	
15 November 2021	FW	(England)	Andy Carroll	Unattached	Free	
15 February 2022	MF	(England)	Brandon Barker	Unattached	Free	
10 March 2022	GK	(Norway)	Ørjan Nyland	Unattached	Free	
24 March 2022	DF	(Saint Lucia)	Terell Thomas	Unattached	Free	

=== Loans in ===
Start date	Position	Nationality	Name	From	End date	Ref.
12 August 2021	MF	(Nigeria)	Tom Dele-Bashiru	Watford	End of season	
27 August 2021	DF	(Ghana)	Baba Rahman	Chelsea	End of season	
30 August 2021	MF	(England)	Danny Drinkwater	Chelsea	End of season	
24 January 2022	GK	(Estonia)	Karl Hein	Arsenal	9 March 2022	
31 January 2022	FW	(England)	Tom Ince	Stoke City	End of season	

=== Out ===
Date	Position	Nationality	Name	To	Fee	Ref.
25 May 2021†	FW	(England)	Thierry Nevers	West Ham United	Undisclosed	
8 July 2021	MF	(France)	Michael Olise	Crystal Palace	Undisclosed	

† Nevers' move was announced on the above date, but was not active until 9 June 2021.

=== Loans out ===
Start date	Position	Nationality	Name	To	End date	Ref.
20 July 2021	GK	(England)	James Holden	Maidenhead United	10 January 2022	
23 July 2021	GK	(Iceland)	Jökull Andrésson	Morecambe	10 January 2022	
28 July 2021	FW	(England)	Nahum Melvin-Lambert	St Patrick's Athletic	November 2021	
13 August 2021	FW	(Scotland)	Marc McNulty	Dundee United	End of season	
20 August 2021	DF	(England)	Jeriel Dorsett	Rochdale	End of season	
20 August 2021	MF	(Belgium)	Jack Senga	Maidenhead United	Work Experience	
19 November 2021	GK	(Jamaica)	Coniah Boyce-Clarke	St Albans City	19 December 2021	
31 January 2022	FW	(Romania)	George Pușcaș	Pisa	End of season	
31 January 2022	DF	(Jamaica)	Liam Moore	Stoke City	End of season	
18 February 2022	GK	(England)	Harvey Collins	Walton Casuals	18 March 2022	
18 March 2022	GK	(Jamaica)	Coniah Boyce-Clarke	Welling United	End of season	

=== Released ===
Date	Position	Nationality	Name	Joined	Date	Ref
15 January 2022	FW	(England)	Andy Carroll	West Bromwich Albion	28 January 2022	
17 January 2022	GK	(Brazil)	Rafael Cabral	Cruzeiro	18 January 2022	
18 May 2022†	GK	(England)	James Holden	Cambridge United	1 July 2022	
26 May 2022†	MF	(England)	John Swift	West Bromwich Albion	1 July 2022	
14 June 2022†	DF	(England)	Ethan Bristow	Tranmere Rovers	1 July 2022	
16 June 2022†	DF	(England)	Lynford Sackey	Bolton Wanderers	1 July 2022	
21 June 2022†	MF	(England)	Josh Laurent	Stoke City	1 July 2022	
24 June 2022†	MF	(England)	Andy Rinomhota	Cardiff City	1 July 2022	
30 June 2022†	MF	(England)	Brandon Barker	AC Omonia	1 July 2022	
30 June 2022	GK	(Norway)	Ørjan Nyland	RB Leipzig	9 October 2022	
30 June 2022	DF	(England)	Jordan Addo-Antoine	Aldershot Town		
30 June 2022	DF	(England)	Tyrell Ashcroft	Tottenham Hotspur	1 July 2022	
30 June 2022	DF	(England)	Michael Morrison	Portsmouth	26 July 2022	
30 June 2022	DF	(England)	Imari Samuels	Brighton & Hove Albion	5 August 2022	
30 June 2022	DF	(Saint Lucia)	Terell Thomas	Charlton Athletic	7 September 2022	
30 June 2022	MF	(Brazil)	Felipe Araruna			
30 June 2022	MF	(Croatia)	Alen Halilović	HNK Rijeka	6 July 2022	
30 June 2022	MF	(England)	Blesk Ekpenyong	TSV Meerbusch		
30 June 2022	MF	(England)	Malachi Talent-Aryeetey	Langley	15 October 2022	
30 June 2022	FW	(England)	Princewill Ehibhatiomhan	Southampton	31 March 2023	
30 June 2022	FW	(Scotland)	Marc McNulty	Orange County SC	19 January 2023	

† Transfers were announced on the above date, but didn't come into effect until 1 July 2022 once their contracts expired on 30 June 2022.

=== Trial ===
Date from	Position	Nationality	Name	Last club	Date to	Ref.
July 2021	FW	(England)	Kyle Edwards	West Bromwich Albion	25 July 2021	
July 2021	DF	(Morocco)	Achraf Lazaar	Watford		
July 2021	MF	(England)	Kadeem Harris	Sheffield Wednesday		
December 2021	DF	(England)	Brandon Mason	Coventry City		
February 2022	DF	(Saint Lucia)	Terell Thomas	Crewe Alexandra	24 March 2022	
February 2022	MF	(England)	Brandon Barker	Rangers	15 February 2022	
April 2022	MF	(Scotland)	Michael Craig	Tottenham Hotspur	22 June 2022	

== Squad ==
As of match played 7 May 2022

No.	Name	Nationality	Position	Date of birth (age)	Signed from	Signed in	Contract ends	Apps.	Goals
Goalkeepers
1	Ørjan Nyland	(Norway)	GK	10 September 1990 (aged 31)	Unattached	2022	2022	10	0
22	Luke Southwood (Note: Luke Southwood was born in Oxford, England, but qualified to represent Northern Ireland, and made his international debut for Northern Ireland in March 2022, having previously played for England at U20 level.)	(Northern Ireland)	GK	6 December 1997 (aged 24)	Academy	2016	2023	30	0
31	Coniah Boyce-Clarke (Note: Coniah Boyce-Clarke was born in England, but qualified to represent Jamaica, and made his international debut for Jamaica U20 in June 2022.)	(Jamaica)	GK	1 March 2003 (aged 19)	Academy	2019		0	0
50	Harvey Collins	(England)	GK	5 November 2002 (aged 19)	Academy	2019	2022	0	0
Defenders
3	Tom Holmes	(England)	DF	12 March 2000 (aged 22)	Academy	2017	2025	75	1
4	Michael Morrison	(England)	DF	3 March 1988 (aged 34)	Birmingham City	2019	2022	113	8
5	Tom McIntyre (Note: Tom McIntyre was born in Reading, England, but qualified to represent Scotland, representing them at U17, U20 and U21 level.)	(Scotland)	DF	6 November 1998 (aged 22)	Academy	2016	2024	64	4
6	Liam Moore (Note: Liam Moore was born in Loughborough, England, but qualified to represent Jamaica, and made his international debut for Jamaica in March 2021.)	(Jamaica)	DF	31 January 1993 (aged 29)	Leicester City	2016	2023	230	8
12	Terell Thomas (Note: Terell Thomas was born in Rainham, England, but qualified to represent Saint Lucia, and made his international debut for Saint Lucia in June 2022.)	(Saint Lucia)	DF	18 October 1995 (aged 26)	Unattached	2022	2022	2	0
17	Andy Yiadom (Note: Andy Yiadom was born in Holloway, England, but qualified to represent Ghana and made his international debut for Ghana in January 2017. He previously represented England at C level.)	(Ghana)	DF	2 December 1991 (aged 30)	Barnsley	2018	2025	132	4
21	Baba Rahman	(Ghana)	DF	2 July 1994 (aged 27)	loan from Chelsea	2021	2022	29	0
24	Scott Dann	(England)	DF	14 February 1987 (aged 35)	Unattached	2021	2023	18	2
34	Jeriel Dorsett (Note: Jeriel Dorsett was born in Enfield, England, but qualified to represent Montserrat and made his international debut for Montserrat in September 2023. He previously represented England at U18 level.)	(England)	DF	4 May 2002 (aged 20)	Academy	2018	2023	2	0
38	Michael Stickland	(England)	DF	24 August 2002 (aged 19)	Academy	2020	2023	3	0
41	Ethan Bristow (Note: Ethan Bristow was born in England, but qualified to represent Saint Kitts and Nevis, and made his international debut for Saint Kitts and Nevis in November 2023.)	(England)	DF	27 November 2001 (aged 20)	Academy	2018	2022	11	0
48	Tyrell Ashcroft	(England)	DF	7 March 2002 (aged 20)	Academy	2020	2022	4	0
49	Kelvin Abrefa (Note: Kelvin Abrefa was born in Italy to Ghanaian parents, going on to make his debut for Ghana U20 in June 2022.)	(Ghana)	DF	9 December 2003 (aged 18)	Academy	2020	2024	3	0
Midfielders
7	Alen Halilović	(Croatia)	MF	18 June 1996 (aged 25)	Unattached	2021	2022	12	1
8	Andy Rinomhota (Note: Rinomhota was born in Leeds, England, but qualified to represent Zimbabwe and made his international debut for Zimbabwe in November 2023.)	(England)	MF	21 April 1997 (aged 25)	Academy	2017	2022	139	4
10	John Swift	(England)	MF	23 June 1995 (aged 26)	Chelsea	2016	2022	202	33
14	Ovie Ejaria	(England)	MF	18 November 1997 (aged 24)	Liverpool	2020	2024	119	9
15	Danny Drinkwater	(England)	MF	5 March 1990 (aged 32)	loan from Chelsea	2021	2022	34	1
16	Dejan Tetek (Note: Dejan Tetek was born in Oxford, England to Serbian parents, making his debut for England U18 in 2019, before switching to represent Serbia at U19 in 2022 and U21 in 2021.)	(Serbia)	MF	24 September 2002 (aged 19)	Academy	2019		21	0
19	Tom Dele-Bashiru (Note: Tom Dele-Bashiru was born in Manchester, England and represented England at U16 level before switching to represent Nigeria U20 and Nigeria U23 in 2019.)	(Nigeria)	MF	17 September 1999 (aged 22)	loan from Watford	2021	2022	39	4
20	Felipe Araruna	(Brazil)	MF	12 March 1996 (aged 26)	São Paulo	2020	2022	9	0
28	Josh Laurent	(England)	MF	6 May 1995 (aged 27)	Shrewsbury Town	2020	2022	88	5
32	Mamadi Camará	(Guinea-Bissau)	MF	31 December 2003 (aged 18)	Feirense	2020	2023	10	0
33	Brandon Barker	(England)	MF	4 October 1996 (aged 25)	Unattached	2022	2022	4	0
Forwards
9	Tom Ince	(England)	FW	30 January 1992 (aged 30)	loan from Stoke City	2022	2022	15	2
11	Yakou Méïté (Note: Yakou Méïte was born in Paris, France, but qualified to represent the Ivory Coast, and made his international debut for Ivory Coast in March 2019.)	(Ivory Coast)	FW	11 February 1996 (aged 26)	Paris Saint-Germain	2016	2023	138	43
18	Lucas João (Note: Lucas João was born in Lisbon, Portugal, and represented Portugal twice in Friendly matches in 2015, before switching international allegiances to Angola in 2022, making his debut for against Guinea-Bissau in March 2022.)	(Angola)	FW	4 September 1993 (aged 28)	Sheffield Wednesday	2019	2023	83	38
23	Junior Hoilett	(Canada)	FW	5 June 1990 (aged 31)	Unattached	2021	2022	27	3
29	Marc McNulty	(Scotland)	FW	14 September 1992 (aged 29)	Coventry City	2018	2022	17	1
30	Femi Azeez (Note: Azeez was born in Westminster, England, but qualified to represent Nigeria and made his international debut for Nigeria in May 2026.)	(England)	FW	5 June 2001 (aged 20)	Wealdstone	2019	2022	15	2
39	Jahmari Clarke (Note: Jahmari Clarke was born in England, but qualified to represent Jamaica, and made his international debut for Jamaica U20 in June 2022.)	(Jamaica)	FW	17 August 2003 (aged 18)	Academy	2020	2022	13	2
47	George Pușcaș	(Romania)	FW	8 April 1996 (aged 26)	Inter Milan	2019	2024	91	20
U23
35	Kelvin Ehibhatiomhan	(Nigeria)	FW	23 April 2002 (aged 20)	Academy	2021	2022	1	0
36	Claudio Osorio	(England) (Note: Claudio Osorio was born in Fatuhada, Timor-Leste, but qualified to represent England representing them at U15 & U16 level before going on to make his international debut for Timor-Leste in September 2024.)	MF	26 September 2002 (aged 19)	Academy	2019	2023	2	0
37	Kian Leavy	(Republic of Ireland)	MF	21 March 2002 (aged 20)	Academy	2018	2023	1	0
40	James Holden	(England)	GK	4 September 2001 (aged 20)	Bury	2019	2022	0	0
42	Lynford Sackey	(England)	DF	18 February 2003 (aged 19)	Academy	2019	2022	2	0
43	Nelson Abbey	(England)	DF	28 August 2003 (aged 18)	Academy	2019	2023	2	0
44	Imari Samuels	(England)	DF	5 February 2003 (aged 19)	Academy	2019	2022	0	0
45	Benjamin Purcell	(Wales)	MF	25 August 2004 (aged 17)	Academy	2020	2023	0	0
46	Jack Senga	(Belgium)	MF	27 January 2004 (aged 18)	Academy	2020	2024	0	0
51	Louie Holzman	(England)	DF	16 November 2003 (aged 18)	Academy	2020	2023	1	0
52	Rashawn Scott	(England)	MF	22 March 2004 (aged 18)	Unattached	2021	2023	1	0
	Jökull Andrésson	(Iceland)	GK	25 August 2001 (aged 20)	Academy	2018	2024	0	0
	Kacper Kowalczyk	(Poland)	GK	18 September 2001 (aged 20)	Stal Rzeszów	2022		0	0
	Louis Hutchings	(England)	MF	22 July 2002 (aged 19)	Academy	2021		0	0
	Malachi Talent-Aryeetey	(England)	MF	10 September 2002 (aged 19)	Academy	2019	2022	0	0
	Nahum Melvin-Lambert (Note: ahum Melvin-Lambert was born in England, but qualified to represent Saint Lucia, and made his international debut for Saint Lucia in June 2023.)	(England)	FW	21 October 2002 (aged 19)	Academy	2019	2022	3	0
U18
	Tom Norcott	(England)	GK	3 January 2005 (aged 17)	Academy	2021		0	0
	Matt Rowley	(England)	GK	12 August 2002 (aged 19)	Academy	2020	2023	0	0
	Jordan Addo-Antoine	(England)	DF	10 September 2004 (aged 17)	Academy	2020	2022	0	0
	Boyd Beacroft	(England)	DF	14 February 2003 (aged 19)	Academy	2021		0	0
	Kyle Daniel-Spray	(England)	DF	11 December 2004 (aged 17)	Academy	2020		0	0
	Abraham Kanu	(Sierra Leone)	DF	3 July 2005 (aged 16)	Academy	2021		0	0
	Zion Nditi	(England)	DF	13 March 2005 (aged 17)	Academy	2021		0	0
	Sam Paul	(England)	DF	12 January 2004 (aged 18)	Academy	2020	2023	0	0
	Hamid Abdel-Salam	(England)	MF	19 October 2003 (aged 18)	Academy	2020	2022	0	0
	Jacob Borgnis	(New Zealand)	MF	5 May 2003 (aged 19)	Academy	2021		0	0
	Ryley Campbell	(England)	MF	29 December 2003 (aged 18)	Academy	2021		0	0
	Harrison Furlong	(England)	MF	9 December 2004 (aged 17)	Academy	2021		0	0
	Ajani Giscombe	(England)	MF	12 May 2004 (aged 17)	Academy	2021	2023	0	0
	Troy Murray	(England)	MF	6 November 2002 (aged 19)	Academy	2021		0	0
	Caylan Vickers	(England)	FW	22 December 2004 (aged 17)	Academy	2021		0	0
	Ashton Greaver	(England)	FW	19 August 2004 (aged 17)	Academy	2021		0	0
	Harvey Maudner	(England)	FW	7 October 2003 (aged 18)	Academy	2020	2023	0	0
	David Nyarko	(England)	FW	7 October 2002 (aged 19)	Academy	2020	2023	0	0
	Jeremiah Okine-Peters	(England)	FW	16 December 2004 (aged 17)	Academy	2021		0	0
Left during the season
9	Andy Carroll	(England)	FW	6 January 1989 (aged 33)	Unattached	2021	2022	8	2
26	Karl Hein	(Estonia)	GK	13 April 2002 (aged 20)	loan from Arsenal	2022	2022	5	0
33	Rafael Cabral	(Brazil)	GK	20 May 1990 (aged 31)	Sampdoria	2019	2022	98	0

== Friendlies ==
In May Reading confirmed their first pre-season friendly, against West Ham United on 21 July, at the Madejski Stadium. Reading's second pre-season friendly was confirmed on 8 June, a behind-closed door meeting with Charlton Athletic at the Madejski Stadium on 24 July. On 21 June, Reading confirmed their first pre-season friendly would be a behind-closed-doors match against Lincoln City on 10 July at their Bearwood Park Training Ground. On 6 July, Reading confirmed that they will travel to Scotland, to face Aberdeen in a behind-closed doors friendly at their Cormack Park training ground on 16 July. On 15 July, Reading confirmed their last pre-season friendly would be a home match against Crystal Palace on 31 July, a week before the new Championship season kicks off.

10 July 2021	Reading	1–0	Lincoln City	Wokingham
13:00 BST (UTC+1)	Ashcroft 71'	Report		Stadium: Bearwood Park

16 July 2021	Aberdeen	Cancelled	Reading	Aberdeen, Scotland
13:30 BST (UTC+1)		Report		Stadium: Cormack Park
Note: Match cancelled due to Three positive COVID-19 results.

21 July 2021	Reading	0–3	West Ham United	Reading
19:00 BST (UTC+1)		Report	Diop 37'; Coventry 56'; Johnson 78'	Stadium: Madejski Stadium

24 July 2021	Reading	1–1	Charlton Athletic	Reading
14:00 BST (UTC+1)	Ejaria 38'	Report	Ghandour 80'	Stadium: Madejski Stadium; Attendance: 0
Note: Match played behind closed doors.

25 July 2021	Hungerford Town	Cancelled	Reading U23	Hungerford
BST (UTC+1)				Stadium: Bulpit Lane
Note: Match cancelled.

27 July 2021	Brighton & Hove Albion	1–2	Reading	Lancing
BST (UTC+1)	Goal	Report	Swift (pen.); Azeez	Stadium: Elite Football Performance Centre
Note: Match played behind closed doors.

30 July 2021	Brighton & Hove Albion U23	v	Reading U23	Lancing
14:00 BST (UTC+1)				Stadium: Elite Football Performance Centre

31 July 2021	Reading	1–3	Crystal Palace	Reading
15:00 BST (UTC+1)	Morrison (yellow card) 51'; Swift 67'	Report	Kouyaté (red card) 30'; Mateta 55' (pen.); R.Street (yellow card) 57'; Ayew 80'; Banks 90+3'	Stadium: Madejski Stadium; Referee: Keith Stroud

6 August 2021	Maidenhead United	1–1	Reading U23	Maidenhead
19:30 BST (UTC+1)	Samuels 68' (o.g.)		Ehibhatiomhan 30'	Stadium: York Road

2 February 2022	Reading	1–1	Queens Park Rangers B	Wokingham
GMT (UTC)	Méïté 15'	Report	Alfa 78' (pen.)	Stadium: Bearwood Park
Note: Behind closed doors

At the end of the season, Reading hosted a charity match between their 2005–06 Championship winning team and their 2011–12 Championship winning team as part of their 150th anniversary celebrations.

21 May 2022 Legends Match: Coppell vs McDermott	2005–06 Reading	5–8	2011–12 Reading	Reading
15:00 GMT (UTC)	Henry 5', 28'; Lita 20'; Doyle 68'; Cox 73'	Report	Roberts 9', 90'; Church 14'; Karacan 32'; Kebe 44'; Howard 51', 60', 84'	Stadium: Madejski Stadium

== Competitions ==
=== Overview ===
Competition	First match	Last match	Starting round	Final position	Record							
Competition	First match	Last match	Starting round	Final position	Pld	W	D	L	GF	GA	GD	Win %
EFL Championship	7 August 2021	7 May 2022	Matchday 1	21st	46	13	8	25	54	87	−33	28.26
FA Cup	8 January 2022	8 January 2022	Third round	Third round	1	0	0	1	1	2	−1	0.00
EFL Cup	10 August 2021	10 August 2021	First round	First round	1	0	0	1	0	3	−3	0.00
Total					48	13	8	27	55	92	−37	27.08

Last updated: 7 May 2022
Source: Competitions

=== Championship ===
On 24 June, the 2021–22 season EFL Championship fixture list was released, with Reading beginning their campaign away at Stoke City, and finishing the season away to Luton Town.

==== League table ====
Pos	Team	Pld	W	D	L	GF	GA	GD	Pts	Promotion, qualification or relegation
18	Cardiff City	46	15	8	23	50	68	−18	53	
19	Hull City	46	14	9	23	41	54	−13	51	
20	Birmingham City	46	11	14	21	50	75	−25	47	
21	Reading	46	13	8	25	54	87	−33	41 (Note: Reading were deducted 6 points for breach of profit and sustainability regulations.)	
22	Peterborough United (R)	46	9	10	27	43	87	−44	37	Relegation to EFL League One
23	Derby County (R)	46	14	13	19	45	53	−8	34 (Note: Derby County were deducted 12 points for entering administration, and a further 9 points for financial irregularities.)	Relegation to EFL League One
24	Barnsley (R)	46	6	12	28	33	73	−40	30	Relegation to EFL League One

Source: EFL Official Website
Rules for classification: 1) Points; 2) Goal difference; 3) Number of goals scored; 4) Head-to-head results; 5) Wins; 6) Away goals; 7) Penalty points (sec 9.5); 8) 12-point sending off offences
(R) Relegated

==== Results summary ====
Overall								Home						Away					
Pld	W	D	L	GF	GA	GD	Pts	W	D	L	GF	GA	GD	W	D	L	GF	GA	GD
46	13	8	25	54	87	−33	41	7	5	11	33	44	−11	6	3	14	21	43	−22

Last updated: 7 May 2022.
Source: Results

==== Results by matchday ====
Matchday	1	2	3	4	5	6	7	8	9	10	11	12	13	14	15	16	17	18	19	20	21	22	23	24	25	26	27	28	29	30	31	32	33	34	35	36	37	38	39	40	41	42	43	44	45	46
Ground	A	H	H	A	A	H	H	A	H	A	A	H	H	A	H	A	A	H (Note: Between matchday 17 and 18, Reading were deducted 6 points.)	H	A	H	A	H (Note: matchday 26)	H (Note: matchday 25)	A (Note: matchday 27)	H (Note: matchday 23)	H (Note: matchday 28)	A (Note: matchday 29)	A (Note: matchday 31)	H (Note: matchday 32)	A (Note: matchday 24)	A (Note: matchday 33)	H (Note: matchday 34)	A (Note: matchday 35)	H (Note: matchday 36)	A (Note: matchday 37)	A (Note: matchday 38)	H (Note: matchday 39)	A (Note: matchday 40)	H (Note: matchday 30)	H	A	H	A	H	A
Result	L	W	L	L	L	D	W	W	W	L	W	W	L	L	L	L	W	D	L	W	D	L	D	L	L	L	L	L	L	L	D	W	W	L	L	L	D	W	D	W	L	W	D	L	L	L
Position	19	13	17	18	21	22	19	13	9	11	10	7	8	13	16	18	16	20	21	21	20	21	21	21	21	21	21	21	21	21	21	21	21	21	21	21	21	21	21	21	21	21	21	21	21	21

Updated to match(es) played on 7 May 2022. Source: Results
A = Away; H = Home; W = Win; D = Draw; L = Loss; P = Postponed

==== Results ====
7 August 2021 1	Stoke City	3–2	Reading	Stoke-on-Trent
15:00 BST (UTC+1)	Powell 25'; Brown 28'; Surridge 85'	Report	Moore (yellow card) 24' (goal) 61'; Swift 27'; Laurent (yellow card) 90'	Stadium: Bet365 Stadium; Attendance: 19,068; Referee: Matt Donohue

14 August 2021 2	Reading	2–1	Preston North End	Reading
15:00 BST (UTC+1)	Azeez 28'; Morrison (yellow card) 59'; Bristow (yellow card) 66'; Swift 69'; Laurent (yellow card) 90+6'	Report	Johnson 61' (pen.)	Stadium: Madejski Stadium; Attendance: 12,156; Referee: Josh Smith

17 August 2021 3	Reading	2–3	Bristol City	Reading
20:00 BST (UTC+1)	Azeez 19'; Moore 81'	Report	Weimann 5', 52'; Martin 14'; James (yellow card) 90+2'	Stadium: Madejski Stadium; Attendance: 14,207; Referee: Andy Woolmer

21 August 2021 4	Coventry City	2–1	Reading	Coventry
15:00 BST (UTC+1)	Hyam (yellow card) 5'; Maatsen (yellow card) 45+1'; Allen 62'; O'Hare (yellow card) 78'; Sheaf (yellow card) 90+4'; Hamer (yellow card) 90+5'; Godden 90+8'	Report	Swift 40' (pen.); Dele-Bashiru (yellow card) 50'; Rinomhota (yellow card) 75'; Clarke (yellow card) 90+1'	Stadium: Coventry Building Society Arena; Attendance: 16,464; Referee: David Webb

28 August 2021 5	Huddersfield Town	4–0	Reading	Huddersfield
15:00 BST (UTC+1)	Thomas (yellow card) 31' (goal) 66'; O'Brien 39'; Pearson 51' (yellow card) 59'; Ward 68'; Lees (yellow card) 81'	Report	Yiadom (yellow card) 23'; Dele-Bashiru (yellow card) 51'	Stadium: John Smith's Stadium; Attendance: 14,613; Referee: Leigh Doughty

11 September 2021 6	Reading	3–3	Queens Park Rangers	Reading
15:00 BST (UTC+1)	Swift 35', 64', 77'; Rafael (yellow card) 82'; Morrison (yellow card) 87'	Report	Morrison 11' (o.g.); Gray 79'; Dickie (yellow card) 89'; Johansen 90+1'	Stadium: Madejski Stadium; Attendance: 14,928; Referee: Geoff Eltringham

14 September 2021 7	Reading	3–1	Peterborough United	Reading
20:00 BST (UTC+1)	Swift 64'; Dele-Bashiru 67', 88'	Report	Kent (yellow card) 45+3'; Thompson 74'	Stadium: Madejski Stadium; Attendance: 11,411; Referee: Tim Robinson

18 September 2021 8	Fulham	1–2	Reading	Fulham
15:00 BST (UTC+1)	Seri (yellow card) 28'; Wilson (yellow card) 57'; Odoi (yellow card) 65'; Ream (yellow card) 77'; Muniz 86'	Report	Ejaria 19', 53'; Hoilett (yellow card) 34'; Swift (yellow card) 56'; Rahman (yellow card) 58'	Stadium: Craven Cottage; Attendance: 18,901; Referee: Steve Martin

25 September 2021 9	Reading	1–0	Middlesbrough	Reading
12:30 BST (UTC+1)	Tetek (yellow card) 49'; Halilović 55'; Southwood (yellow card) 79'; Rahman (yellow card) 81'	Report	Jones (yellow card) 42'; Peltier (yellow card) 61'; Crooks (red card) 86'; McNair (yellow card) 90+3'	Stadium: Madejski Stadium; Attendance: 12,469; Referee: Peter Bankes

29 September 2021 10	Derby County	1–0	Reading	Derby
19:45 BST (UTC+1)	Stearman (yellow card) 16'; Forsyth 33'; Byrne (yellow card) 59'; Shinnie (yellow card) 74'; Lawrence (yellow card) 90+2'	Report		Stadium: Pride Park Stadium; Attendance: 18,769; Referee: John Busby

2 October 2021 11	Cardiff City	0–1	Reading	Cardiff
15:00 BST (UTC+1)	Pack (yellow card) 32'; Ralls (yellow card) 37'; Collins (yellow card) 84'; McGuinness (yellow card) 90+4'	Report	Hoilett 38'	Stadium: Cardiff City Stadium; Attendance: 18,400; Referee: Thomas Bramall

16 October 2021 12	Reading	1–0	Barnsley	Reading
15:00 BST (UTC+1)	Swift 77'	Report	Brittain (yellow card) 29'; Gomes (yellow card) 56'	Stadium: Madejski Stadium; Attendance: 12,199; Referee: Andy Davies

20 October 2021 13	Reading	2–3	Blackpool	Reading
20:00 BST (UTC+1)	Dann 11'; Dele-Bashiru 21'	Report	Yates (yellow card) 52', (goal) 73', 85' (pen.); Mitchell (yellow card) 57'; Dale 69'; Grimshaw (yellow card) 90+2'	Stadium: Madejski Stadium; Attendance: 10,587; Referee: Jeremy Simpson

23 October 2021 14	Blackburn Rovers	2–0	Reading	Blackburn
15:00 BST (UTC+1)	Buckley (yellow card) 38'; Gallagher 61'; Dolan 64' van Hecke (yellow card) 72'; Poveda (yellow card) 79'; Johnson (yellow card) 90'	Report	Swift (yellow card) 56'; Drinkwater (yellow card) 90+2'	Stadium: Ewood Park; Attendance: 10,517; Referee: Tony Harrington

30 October 2021 15	Reading	0–2	Bournemouth	Reading
20:00 BST (UTC+1)	Laurent (yellow card) 13'	Report	Kilkenny (yellow card) 37'; Anthony (yellow card) 38'; Solanke 43'; Lowe 59'; Mepham (yellow card) 90+1'	Stadium: Madejski Stadium; Attendance: 13,551; Referee: Oliver Langford

2 November 2021 16	Millwall	1–0	Reading	Bermondsey
19:45 GMT (UTC)	Kieftenbeld (yellow card) 31'; Afobe 71'; Leonard (yellow card) 88'	Report		Stadium: The Den; Attendance: 11,004; Referee: Gavin Ward

6 November 2021 17	Birmingham City	1–2	Reading	Birmingham
15:30 GMT (UTC)	Hogan 3'; Bela (yellow card) 30'; Dean (yellow card) 34'; Oakley (yellow card) 38'; McGree (yellow card) 55'	Report	Clarke 70', 82'; Holmes (yellow card) 76'	Stadium: St Andrew's; Attendance: 17,535; Referee: Thomas Bramall
Note: Match delayed by 30 minutes due to electrical issues at the ground.

20 November 2021 18	Reading	1–1	Nottingham Forest	Reading
15:00 GMT (UTC)	Moore (yellow card) 32'; Drinkwater (yellow card) 57'; Dann 64'; Swift (yellow card) 66'; Rahman (yellow card) 87'	Report	Zinckernagel 4'; Yates (yellow card) 37'	Stadium: Madejski Stadium; Attendance: 14,907; Referee: Andy Woolmer

23 November 2021 19	Reading	0–1	Sheffield United	Reading
20:00 GMT (UTC)		Report	Fleck (yellow card) 15'; Bogle 56'; Brewster (yellow card) 77'; Gibbs-White (yellow card) 90+2'	Stadium: Madejski Stadium; Attendance: 10,247; Referee: Andy Davies

27 November 2021 20	Swansea City	2–3	Reading	Swansea
15:00 GMT (UTC)	Paterson 3'; Manning 49'; Laird (yellow card) 83'	Report	Dele-Bashiru 4'; Carroll 30'; Drinkwater 50' (yellow card) 74'; Swift (yellow card) 86'; Pușcaș (yellow card) 89'	Stadium: Swansea.com Stadium; Attendance: 16,980; Referee: Tony Harrington

4 December 2021 21	Reading	1–1	Hull City	Reading
15:00 GMT (UTC)	Halilović (yellow card) 40'; Holmes 45+2'; Rahman (yellow card) 74'	Report	Wilks 55'; Elder (yellow card) 90+3'	Stadium: Madejski Stadium; Attendance: 11,827; Referee: Steve Martin

11 December 2021 22	West Bromwich Albion	1–0	Reading	West Bromwich
15:00 GMT (UTC)	Robinson 62', (yellow card) 63'	Report	Halilović (yellow card) 34'; Tetek (yellow card) 66'	Stadium: The Hawthorns; Attendance: 11,109; Referee: David Webb

3 January 2022 26	Reading	2–2	Derby County	Reading
15:00 GMT (UTC)	Hoilett 37', 57'; Laurent (yellow card) 45'	Report	Davies (yellow card) 82', (goal) 90+1'; Kazim-Richards 86'; Byrne (yellow card) 90+6'	Stadium: Madejski Stadium; Attendance: 12,512; Referee: John Busby

11 January 2022 25	Reading	0–7	Fulham	Reading
20:00 GMT (UTC)	Drinkwater (yellow card) 41'	Report	Wilson 13', 60'; Mitrović 45+3' (pen.), 89'; Tete 68'; Kebano 70'; Adarabioyo 75'	Stadium: Madejski Stadium; Attendance: 11,472; Referee: Tony Harrington
Note: Match originally scheduled for 29 December 2021, but postponed on 27 December 2021 due to COVID-19.

15 January 2022 27	Middlesbrough	2–1	Reading	Middlesbrough
15:00 GMT (UTC)	Tavernier (yellow card) 74'; Crooks 84', 90+5'	Report	Bristow (yellow card) 12'; Hoilett (yellow card) 36'; Drinkwater (yellow card) 65'; Carroll 68'	Stadium: Riverside Stadium; Attendance: 21,634; Referee: James Linington

19 January 2022 23	Reading	0–2	Luton Town	Reading
20:00 GMT (UTC)	Drinkwater (yellow card) 90'; João (yellow card) 90+1'	Report	Holmes 33' (o.g.); Campbell 58'	Stadium: Madejski Stadium; Attendance: 9,611; Referee: Tim Robinson
Note: Match originally scheduled for 18 December 2021, but postponed on 15 December 2021 due to COVID-19.

22 January 2022 28	Reading	3–4	Huddersfield Town	Reading
15:00 GMT (UTC)	João 5'; Pușcaș 22'; Yiadom (yellow card) 26'; Morrison 45' (yellow card) 80'; Laurent (yellow card) 52'	Report	Sinani 9'; Ward 15', 25', 53'; Nicholls (yellow card) 71'	Stadium: Madejski Stadium; Attendance: 10,796; Referee: Robert Jones

29 January 2022 29	Queens Park Rangers	4–0	Reading	White City
15:00 GMT (UTC)	Dykes 13', 35'; Amos 37'; Dickie (yellow card) 44'; Wallace (yellow card) 45+2'; Adomah (yellow card) 49'; Dunne 51'; Field (yellow card) 90+1'	Report	Rinomhota (yellow card) 48'; Swift (yellow card) 72'	Stadium: Loftus Road; Attendance: 16,057; Referee: Jeremy Simpson

9 February 2022 31	Bristol City	2–1	Reading	Bristol
19:45 GMT (UTC)	Kalas (yellow card) 32'; Semenyo 44'; Morrison 47' (o.g.); Dasilva (yellow card) 67'; Martin (yellow card) 82'; Williams (yellow card) 90+6'	Report	Holmes (yellow card) 22'; Swift 74' (pen.)	Stadium: Ashton Gate Stadium; Attendance: 17,798; Referee: Oliver Langford

12 February 2022 32	Reading	2–3	Coventry City	Reading
15:00 GMT (UTC)	João 23'; Yiadom 55'; Hoilett (yellow card) 57' (yellow-red card) 63'; Holmes (yellow card) 84'	Report	Bidwell (yellow card) 14'; Hamer (yellow card) 29'; Hyam (yellow card) 37' (goal) 45+2'; Rose 47'; Maatsen 65' (yellow card) 88'; Sheaf (yellow card) 72'	Stadium: Madejski Stadium; Attendance: 22,692; Referee: David Webb

16 February 2022 24	Peterborough United	0–0	Reading	Peterborough
19:45 GMT (UTC)	Norburn (yellow card) 21'; Coulson (yellow card) 46'; Thompson (yellow card) 89'	Report	Holmes (yellow card) 86'; Yiadom (yellow card) 90'	Stadium: London Road Stadium; Attendance: 11,520; Referee: Matt Donohue
Note: Match originally scheduled for 26 December 2021, but postponed on 21 December 2021 due to COVID-19.

19 February 2022 33	Preston North End	2–3	Reading	Preston
15:00 GMT (UTC)	Johnson 57'; Archer 74' van den Berg (yellow card) 90+5'	Report	João 2', 19'; Swift 55'	Stadium: Deepdale; Attendance: 12,817; Referee: John Busby

22 February 2022 34	Reading	2–1	Birmingham City	Reading
20:00 GMT (UTC)	João 67'; Swift 73' (pen.)	Report	Pedersen (yellow card) 31'; Bela (yellow card) 51'; Hernández (yellow card) 72'; McIntyre 82' (o.g.)	Stadium: Madejski Stadium; Attendance: 12,073; Referee: Simon Hooper

26 February 2022 35	Blackpool	4–1	Reading	Blackpool
15:00 GMT (UTC)	Ekpiteta 27'; Madine 61'; Yates (yellow card) 77'; Lavery 86'; Bowler 90'	Report	João 17'	Stadium: Bloomfield Road; Attendance: 10,954; Referee: Peter Bankes

5 March 2022 36	Reading	0–1	Millwall	Reading
15:00 GMT (UTC)	Rinomhota (yellow card) 56'; Yiadom (yellow card) 90'	Report	M.Wallace (yellow card) 11'; Cooper 37' (yellow card) 45'	Stadium: Madejski Stadium; Attendance: 14,169; Referee: Andy Woolmer

12 March 2022 37	Nottingham Forest	4–0	Reading	West Bridgford
15:00 GMT (UTC)	Davis 1', 62' (yellow card) 63'; Colback (yellow card) 32'; Yates 75'; Surridge 80'	Report	Ince (yellow card) 9'; Yiadom (yellow card) 28'; Drinkwater (yellow card) 38'; Morrison (yellow card) 50'	Stadium: City Ground; Attendance: 28,128; Referee: Thomas Bramall

15 March 2022 38	Bournemouth	1–1	Reading	Bournemouth
19:45 GMT (UTC)	Solanke 8'; Cantwell (yellow card) 27'; Lerma (yellow card) 90'	Report	Laurent (yellow card) 33'; Ince 83'	Stadium: Dean Court; Attendance: 9,085; Referee: Leigh Doughty

19 March 2022 39	Reading	1–0	Blackburn Rovers	Reading
15:00 GMT (UTC)	Yiadom (yellow card) 15'; Laurent 78'	Report	Buckley (yellow card) 49'; Wharton (yellow card) 90+4'	Stadium: Madejski Stadium; Attendance: 12,805; Referee: James Linington

2 April 2022 40	Barnsley	1–1	Reading	Barnsley
15:00 BST (UTC+1)	Morris 5'; Andersen (yellow card) 11'; Brittain (yellow card) 66'	Report	Swift (yellow card) 34'; Ince (yellow card) 56'; Laurent 82'	Stadium: Oakwell; Attendance: 14,149; Referee: Keith Stroud

5 April 2022 30	Reading	2–1	Stoke City	Reading
20:00 BST (UTC+1)	Morrison 13'; Ejaria (yellow card) 30'; Harwood-Bellis 63' (o.g.)	Report	Sawyers 44'; Tymon (yellow card) 62'; Harwood-Bellis (yellow card) 71'; Wilmot (yellow card) 90+1'	Stadium: Madejski Stadium; Attendance: 9,928; Referee: Dean Whitestone
Note: Match originally scheduled for 15 February 2022, but postponed on 10 January 2022 due to Stoke City progressing to the Fourth Round of the FA Cup.

9 April 2022 41	Reading	1–2	Cardiff City	Reading
15:00 BST (UTC+1)	João 7'	Report	Doughty 59'; Ng (yellow card) 70'; Vaulks 85'	Stadium: Madejski Stadium; Attendance: 19,039; Referee: Michael Salisbury

15 April 2022 42	Sheffield United	1–2	Reading	Sheffield
15:00 BST (UTC+1)	Gibbs-White (yellow card) 6'; Baldock (yellow card) 57'; Jebbison (yellow card) 81'; Ndiaye (yellow card) 87' (goal) 90'	Report	João 17'; Laurent (yellow card) 18'; Yiadom (yellow card) 48'; McIntyre 90+2' (yellow card) 90+2'; Morrison (yellow card) 90+4'	Stadium: Bramall Lane; Attendance: 29,125; Referee: Gavin Ward

18 April 2022 43	Reading	4–4	Swansea City	Reading
15:00 BST (UTC+1)	João 3' (pen.), 71'; Ince (yellow card) 20' (goal) 61'; Morrison (yellow card) 68'; McIntyre 90+5'	Report	Wolf 6'; Piroe 12', 45+2' (pen.); Downes (yellow card) 41'; Obafemi 58' (yellow card) 90+4'; Christie (yellow card) 55'; Ntcham (yellow card) 90'	Stadium: Madejski Stadium; Attendance: 14,335; Referee: Kevin Friend

23 April 2022 44	Hull City	3–0	Reading	Kingston upon Hull
15:00 BST (UTC+1)	Lewis-Potter 40', 90+4'; Jones 53'; Greaves (yellow card) 59'; Baxter (yellow card) 86'	Report	Morrison (yellow card) 73'	Stadium: MKM Stadium; Attendance: 12,211; Referee: Tim Robinson

30 April 2022 45	Reading	0–1	West Bromwich Albion	Reading
15:00 BST (UTC+1)	Drinkwater (yellow card) 62'	Report	Phillips (yellow card) 32'; Molumby (yellow card) 55'; Grant 78'; Ashworth (yellow card) 90+3'	Stadium: Madejski Stadium; Attendance: 15,509; Referee: Matt Donohue

7 May 2022 46	Luton Town	1–0	Reading	Luton
12:30 BST (UTC+1)	Cornick 45+1'	Report	Rahman (yellow card) 41'	Stadium: Kenilworth Road; Attendance: 10,070; Referee: Jeremy Simpson

=== EFL Cup ===
On 24 June, Reading were drawn at home to Swansea City in the First Round of the 2021–22 EFL Cup,

10 August 2021 First round	Reading	0–3	Swansea City	Reading
20:00 BST (UTC+1)	Camará (yellow card) 34'; Stickland (yellow card) 87'	Report	Latibeaudiere 16'; Naughton (yellow card) 32'; D.Williams (yellow card) 37'; Cabango 60'; Piroe 83'	Stadium: Madejski Stadium; Attendance: 4,989; Referee: Sam Barrott

=== FA Cup ===
On 6 December, Reading were drawn away to Kidderminster Harriers in the Third Round of the 2021–22 FA Cup.

8 January 2022 Third round	Kidderminster Harriers	2–1	Reading	Kidderminster
15:00 GMT (UTC)	Austin 69'; Morgan-Smith 82'; Simpson (yellow card) 90+10'	Report	Holmes (yellow card) 39'; Pușcaș 45'; Camará (yellow card) 52'; Rinomhota (yellow card) 74'; Rafael (yellow card) 82'	Stadium: Aggborough Stadium; Attendance: 5,178; Referee: Gavin Ward

== Squad statistics ==
As of match played 7 May 2022

=== Appearances and goals ===
No.	Pos	Nat	Player	Total		Championship		FA Cup		League Cup	
No.	Pos	Nat	Player	Apps	Goals	Apps	Goals	Apps	Goals	Apps	Goals
1	GK	(Norway) NOR	Ørjan Nyland	10	0	10	0	0	0	0	0
3	DF	(England) ENG	Tom Holmes	34	1	27+5	1	1	0	1	0
4	DF	(England) ENG	Michael Morrison	29	2	29	2	0	0	0	0
5	DF	(Scotland) SCO	Tom McIntyre	20	2	18+1	2	0	0	1	0
7	MF	(Croatia) CRO	Alen Halilović	12	1	9+2	1	1	0	0	0
8	MF	(England) ENG	Andy Rinomhota	21	0	19+1	0	0+1	0	0	0
9	FW	(England) ENG	Tom Ince	15	2	15	2	0	0	0	0
10	MF	(England) ENG	John Swift	37	11	35+2	11	0	0	0	0
11	FW	(Ivory Coast) CIV	Yakou Méïté	13	0	3+10	0	0	0	0	0
12	DF	(Saint Lucia) LCA	Terell Thomas	2	0	2	0	0	0	0	0
14	MF	(England) ENG	Ovie Ejaria	26	2	21+5	2	0	0	0	0
15	MF	(England) ENG	Danny Drinkwater	34	1	31+2	1	1	0	0	0
16	MF	(Serbia) SRB	Dejan Tetek	12	0	5+5	0	1	0	1	0
17	DF	(Ghana) GHA	Andy Yiadom	38	1	38	1	0	0	0	0
18	FW	(Angola) ANG	Lucas João	24	10	21+3	10	0	0	0	0
19	MF	(Nigeria) NGR	Tom Dele-Bashiru	39	4	27+11	4	1	0	0	0
20	MF	(Brazil) BRA	Felipe Araruna	2	0	0+1	0	0+1	0	0	0
21	DF	(Ghana) GHA	Baba Rahman	29	0	29	0	0	0	0	0
22	GK	(Northern Ireland) NIR	Luke Southwood	26	0	25	0	0	0	1	0
23	FW	(Canada) CAN	Junior Hoilett	27	3	21+6	3	0	0	0	0
24	DF	(England) ENG	Scott Dann	18	2	14+4	2	0	0	0	0
28	MF	(England) ENG	Josh Laurent	42	2	41	2	0+1	0	0	0
30	FW	(England) ENG	Femi Azeez	14	2	5+8	2	0+1	0	0	0
32	MF	(Guinea-Bissau) GBS	Mamadi Camará	8	0	0+6	0	1	0	1	0
33	MF	(England) ENG	Brandon Barker	4	0	0+4	0	0	0	0	0
35	FW	(Nigeria) NGR	Kelvin Ehibhatiomhan	1	0	0	0	0	0	1	0
36	MF	(England) ENG	Claudio Osorio	2	0	0	0	1	0	1	0
37	MF	(Republic of Ireland) IRL	Kian Leavy	1	0	0	0	0	0	1	0
38	DF	(England) ENG	Michael Stickland	3	0	0+1	0	0+1	0	0+1	0
39	FW	(Jamaica) JAM	Jahmari Clarke	13	2	0+12	2	0	0	0+1	0
41	DF	(England) ENG	Ethan Bristow	8	0	6	0	1	0	0+1	0
42	DF	(England) ENG	Lynford Sackey	1	0	0	0	0	0	1	0
43	DF	(England) ENG	Nelson Abbey	1	0	0	0	0	0	1	0
48	DF	(England) ENG	Tyrell Ashcroft	4	0	4	0	0	0	0	0
49	DF	(Ghana) GHA	Kelvin Abrefa	3	0	0+3	0	0	0	0	0
51	DF	(England) ENG	Louie Holzman	1	0	0	0	1	0	0	0
52	MF	(England) ENG	Rashawn Scott	1	0	0+1	0	0	0	0	0
Players away on loan:
6	DF	(Jamaica) JAM	Liam Moore	17	2	17	2	0	0	0	0
47	FW	(Romania) ROU	George Pușcaș	27	2	16+9	1	1	1	1	0
Players who appeared for Reading but left during the season:
9	FW	(England) ENG	Andy Carroll	8	2	6+2	2	0	0	0	0
26	GK	(Estonia) EST	Karl Hein	5	0	5	0	0	0	0	0
33	GK	(Brazil) BRA	Rafael Cabral	7	0	6	0	1	0	0	0

=== Goal scorers ===
Place	Position	Nation	Number	Name	Championship	FA Cup	League Cup	Total
1	MF	(England)	10	John Swift	11	0	0	11
2	FW	(Angola)	18	Lucas João	10	0	0	10
3	MF	(Nigeria)	19	Tom Dele-Bashiru	4	0	0	4
4	FW	(Canada)	23	Junior Hoilett	3	0	0	3
5	FW	(England)	30	Femi Azeez	2	0	0	2
5	DF	(Jamaica)	6	Liam Moore	2	0	0	2
5	MF	(England)	14	Ovie Ejaria	2	0	0	2
5	FW	(England)	39	Jahmari Clarke	2	0	0	2
5	DF	(England)	24	Scott Dann	2	0	0	2
5	FW	(England)	9	Andy Carroll	2	0	0	2
5	MF	(England)	28	Josh Laurent	2	0	0	2
5	DF	(England)	4	Michael Morrison	2	0	0	2
5	FW	(England)	9	Tom Ince	2	0	0	2
5	DF	(Scotland)	5	Tom McIntyre	2	0	0	2
5	FW	(Romania)	47	George Pușcaș	1	1	0	2
16	MF	(Croatia)	7	Alen Halilović	1	0	0	1
16	MF	(England)	15	Danny Drinkwater	1	0	0	1
16	DF	(England)	3	Tom Holmes	1	0	0	1
16	DF	(Ghana)	17	Andy Yiadom	1	0	0	1
16				Own goal	1	0	0	1
Total					54	1	0	55

=== Clean sheets ===
Place	Position	Nation	Number	Name	Championship	FA Cup	League Cup	Total
1	GK	(Northern Ireland)	22	Luke Southwood	3	0	0	3
2	GK	(Estonia)	26	Karl Hein	1	0	0	1
2	GK	(Norway)	1	Ørjan Nyland	1	0	0	1
TOTALS					5	0	0	5

=== Disciplinary record ===
Number	Nation	Position	Name	Championship		FA Cup		League Cup		Total	
Number	Nation	Position	Name	Booked	Sent off (straight red)	Booked	Sent off (straight red)	Booked	Sent off (straight red)	Booked	Sent off (straight red)
3	(England)	DF	Tom Holmes	4	0	1	0	0	0	5	0
4	(England)	DF	Michael Morrison	7	0	0	0	0	0	7	0
5	(Scotland)	DF	Tom McIntyre	1	0	0	0	0	0	1	0
7	(Croatia)	MF	Alen Halilović	2	0	0	0	0	0	2	0
8	(England)	MF	Andy Rinomhota	3	0	1	0	0	0	4	0
9	(England)	FW	Tom Ince	3	0	0	0	0	0	3	0
10	(England)	MF	John Swift	6	0	0	0	0	0	6	0
14	(England)	MF	Ovie Ejaria	1	0	0	0	0	0	1	0
15	(England)	MF	Danny Drinkwater	8	0	0	0	0	0	8	0
16	(Serbia)	MF	Dejan Tetek	2	0	0	0	0	0	2	0
17	(Ghana)	DF	Andy Yiadom	7	0	0	0	0	0	7	0
18	(Angola)	FW	Lucas João	1	0	0	0	0	0	1	0
19	(Nigeria)	MF	Tom Dele-Bashiru	2	0	0	0	0	0	2	0
21	(Ghana)	DF	Baba Rahman	5	0	0	0	0	0	5	0
22	(Northern Ireland)	GK	Luke Southwood	1	0	0	0	0	0	1	0
23	(Canada)	FW	Junior Hoilett	4	1	0	0	0	0	4	1
28	(England)	MF	Josh Laurent	7	0	0	0	0	0	7	0
32	(Guinea-Bissau)	MF	Mamadi Camará	0	0	1	0	1	0	2	0
38	(England)	DF	Michael Stickland	0	0	0	0	1	0	1	0
39	(Jamaica)	FW	Jahmari Clarke	1	0	0	0	0	0	1	0
41	(England)	DF	Ethan Bristow	2	0	0	0	0	0	2	0
Players away on loan:
6	(Jamaica)	DF	Liam Moore	2	0	0	0	0	0	2	0
47	(Romania)	FW	George Pușcaș	1	0	0	0	0	0	1	0
Players who left Reading during the season:
33	(Brazil)	GK	Rafael Cabral	1	0	1	0	0	0	2	0
Total				70	1	4	0	2	0	76	1

== Awards ==
=== Player of the Month ===
Month	Name	Award
February	Lucas João	Won
