= Ryan Edwards (Australian soccer) =

Australian professional football player (born 1993)

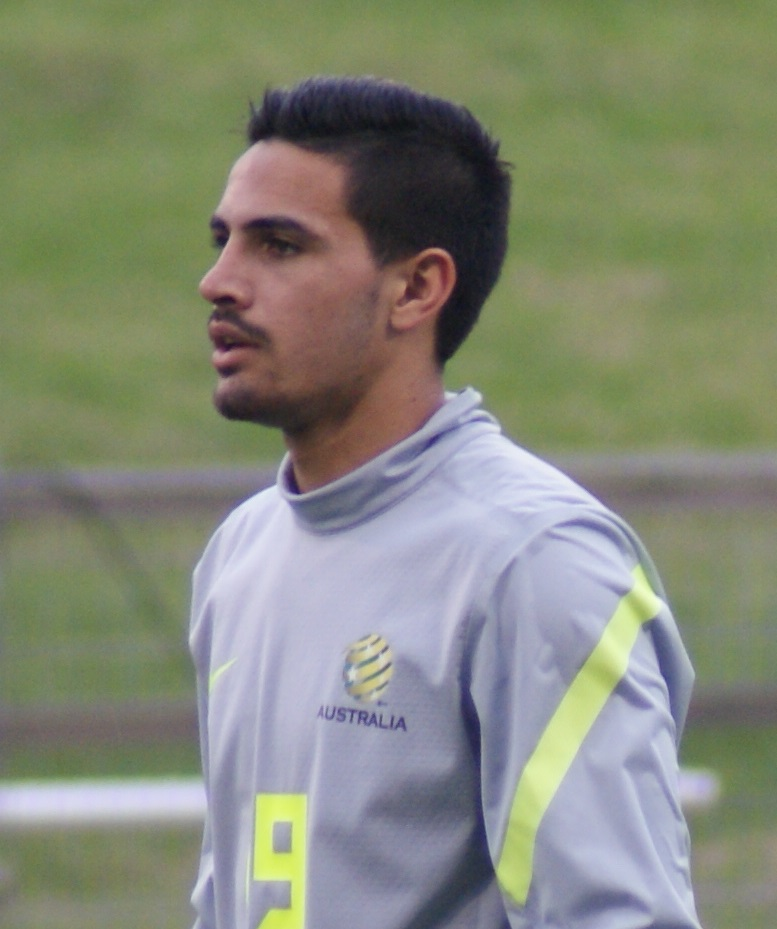
- Edwards playing for the Young Socceroos in 2013

Personal information
- Full name: Ryan Marc Edwards
- Date of birth: 17 November 1993 (age 32)
- Place of birth: Singapore
- Height: 1.75 m (5 ft 9 in)
- Position: Central midfielder

Team information
- Current team: BG Pathum United
- Number: 33

Youth career
- 2007–2011: AIS
- 2011–2012: Reading

Senior career*
Years	Team	Apps	(Gls)
2012–2015	Reading	7	(0)
2013–2014	→ Perth Glory (loan)	15	(0)
2015–2018	Partick Thistle	91	(7)
2018–2019	Heart of Midlothian	4	(0)
2018–2019	→ St Mirren (loan)	14	(0)
2019–2021	Burton Albion	75	(6)
2021–2022	Busan IPark	50	(0)
2023–2024	Amorebieta	47	(4)
2024–2025	Marbella	32	(3)
2025–2026	Omonia Aradippou	27	(0)
2026–	BG Pathum United	0	(0)

International career
2010–2013	Australia U20	18	(2)
2014–2016	Australia U-23	18	(0)
Medal record
Representing Australia
Men's Association football
AFC U-20 Asian Cup
Runner-up	2010 China
- * Club domestic league appearances and goals as of 16:16, 7 June 2026 (UTC)

Ryan Marc Edwards (born 17 November 1993) is an Australian professional football player who plays as a midfielder for Thai League 1 club BG Pathum United.

Born in Singapore, Edwards played youth soccer at the Australian Institute of Sport and for Reading before making his professional debut for Perth Glory on loan in 2013. In 2015, Edwards left Reading to join Scottish Premiership club Partick Thistle. Edwards left Thistle after they were relegated in 2018, and signed for Hearts.

He has represented Australia at under-20 and under-23 level. In March 2017 Edwards was called up to the senior Australian national team.

== Early life ==
Edwards was born in Singapore. Despite having been in the country for around 10 days after his birth, Edwards was called up for national service for Singapore on his 18th birthday. He was able to wait until age 21 and have his citizenship renounced, therefore avoiding conscription. His father, Alistair, is a former Australian international and his mother is a Singaporean national, and his older brother Cameron is also a professional footballer.

== Club career ==
=== Reading ===
On 29 April 2011, it was announced he had signed with Championship side Reading along with his older brother Cameron.

==== Perth Glory (loan) ====
On 16 July 2013, Edwards left Reading on a season long loan to Perth Glory, then managed by his father Alistair and featuring his brother Cameron. Edwards made his debut for Perth Glory on 13 October 2013 in their first game of the 2013–14 season, a 3–1 away defeat to Adelaide United.

==== 2014–15 season ====
In April 2015, Edwards announced he'd been informed by Reading that they would not be renewing his contract, which expired that summer, with his release from Reading confirmed on 21 May.

=== Partick Thistle ===
Following his release from Reading, Edwards' went on trial with Crawley Town. and trained with Manchester City in the lead up to Australia U-23's matches in September 2015.

On 24 September 2015, Edwards signed a one-year contract with Scottish Premiership side Partick Thistle. Edwards made his Partick Thistle debut in a 3–0 win over Dundee United coming on as a substitute Edwards scored his first goal for Partick Thistle in a 2–1 victory against Hamilton Academical at New Douglas Park on 19 March 2016. On 1 April 2016, Edwards extended his contract with Partick Thistle, until the end of the 2016–17 season. Edwards contract was again extended, this time until the end of the 2017/18 season, on 17 November 2016, after the midfielder had triggered an extension.

On 30 June 2016 Edwards signed a contract extension to stay at Partick Thistle until summer 2020. Thistle were relegated via the playoffs at the end of the 2017/18 season. Following that relegation, Edwards invoked a clause in his contract which allowed him to leave Thistle immediately.

=== Heart of Midlothian ===
On 6 June 2018, Edwards signed a two-year contract with Hearts. At the end of August 2018, Edwards was loaned to St Mirren. Ryan Edwards returned to Hearts in January 2019 after stating his desire to return and play for the club. Edwards made his debut in the Edinburgh Derby against Hibernian, helping them to a 1-1 draw. He made his first start the following week against Kilmarnock. Edwards scored in the 2019 Scottish Cup Final to give Hearts the lead in an eventual 2–1 defeat to Celtic.

=== Busan IPark ===
On 5 July 2021, Edwards joined Busan IPark of K League 2.

=== Amorebieta ===
On 7 March 2023, Edwards signed for Primera Federación club SD Amorebieta. He featured in 13 league matches as the club achieved promotion to Segunda División.

=== Marbella ===
On 24 July 2024, Edwards moved to Primera Federación club Marbella.

== International career ==
Edwards has captained the Australia national under-20 association football team, and was a member of the Australian squad that went to the 2013 FIFA U-20 World Cup. He was part of the U-23 squad that took part in the 2013 AFC U-22 Championship in Oman, and the 2016 AFC U-23 Championship in Qatar. In March 2017 Edwards was called up to the senior Australian national team.

== Career statistics ==
As of match played 24 May 2025

Appearances and goals by club, season and competition
Club	Season	League			Cup		League Cup		Other		Total	
Club	Season	Division	Apps	Goals	Apps	Goals	Apps	Goals	Apps	Goals	Apps	Goals
Reading	2012–13	Premier League	0	0	0	0	0	0	—		0	0
Reading	2013–14	Championship	0	0	0	0	0	0	—		0	0
Reading	2014–15	Championship	7	0	0	0	3	0	0	0	10	0
Reading	Total		7	0	0	0	3	0	0	0	10	0
Perth Glory (loan)	2013–14	A-League	15	0	—		—		—		15	0
Partick Thistle	2015–16	Scottish Premiership	17	2	0	0	0	0	—		17	2
Partick Thistle	2016–17	Scottish Premiership	38	1	2	0	5	0	—		45	1
Partick Thistle	2017–18	Scottish Premiership	36	4	2	0	6	1	2	0	46	5
Partick Thistle	Total		91	7	4	0	11	1	2	0	108	8
Heart of Midlothian	2018–19	Scottish Premiership	4	0	1	1	0	0	—		5	1
St Mirren (loan)	2018–19	Scottish Premiership	14	0	0	0	0	0	—		14	0
Burton Albion	2019–20	League One	33	5	4	1	4	1	3	0	44	7
Burton Albion	2020–21	League One	42	1	1	0	1	0	2	1	46	2
Burton Albion	Total		75	6	5	1	5	1	5	1	88	9
Busan IPark	2021	K League 2	16	0	0	0	—		—		16	0
Busan IPark	2022	K League 2	34	0	1	0	—		—		35	0
Busan IPark	Total		50	0	1	0	0	0	0	0	51	0
Amorebieta	2022–23	Primera Federación	13	0	0	0	0	0	—		13	0
Amorebieta	2023–24	Segunda División	36	4	2	0	0	0	—		38	4
Amorebieta	Total		49	4	2	0	0	0	0	0	51	4
Marbella	2024–25	Primera Federación	32	3	1	0	0	0	—		33	3
Career total			325	19	14	2	19	2	7	1	365	24

== Honours ==
=== Player ===
Heart of Midlothian

- Scottish Cup: runner-up: 2018–19

Australia U-20

- AFC U-20 Asian Cup: runner-up 2010

Amorebieta

- Primera Federación: 2022–23 (Group 2 and overall champion)

=== Individual ===
- Burton Albion Player of the Year: 2020–21

== See also ==
- List of association football families
- List of Reading F.C. players (1–24 appearances)
