= Rashawn Scott (footballer) =

English footballer (born 1998)

Personal information
- Full name: Rashawn Rivaldo Scott
- Date of birth: 31 October 1999 (age 27)
- Place of birth: Lambeth, England
- Position: Midfielder

Team information
- Current team: Salisbury
- Number: 20

Youth career
- –2019: Chelsea
- 2021–2023: Reading

Senior career*
Years	Team	Apps	(Gls)
2022–2023	Reading	1	(0)
2024	Ebbsfleet United	0	(0)
2024–2025	Bishop's Stortford	30	(4)
2025–2026	Dagenham & Redbridge	22	(0)
2026	→ Chippenham Town (loan)	5	(0)
2026	Farnborough	6	(0)
2026–	Salisbury	0	(0)
- * Club domestic league appearances and goals as of 21:06, 7 October 2026 (UTC)

Rashawn Rivaldo Scott (born 31 October 2002) is an English footballer who plays as a midfielder for National League South club Salisbury.

== Career ==
On 21 October 2021, Reading announced the signing of Scott for their under-23 team until the end of the season. On 24 June 2022, the club announced that Scott had signed a new contract for the 2022–23 season. On 17 May 2023, Reading announced that Scott would leave the club upon the expiration of his contract.

Following his departure from Reading, Scott spent time on trial with Derby County in August 2023 and featured for their under-21 side in a 3–1 defeat to Mansfield Town. He subsequently made one appearance for Ebbsfleet United in March 2024 before joining Bishop's Stortford ahead of the 2024–25 season.

On 18 July 2025, Scott joined National League South side Dagenham & Redbridge on a one-year contract.

On 11 June 2026, Farnborough announced the signing of Scott. On 7 October 2026, Scott joined fellow National League South side Salisbury on a deal until the end of the 2026–27 season.

== Career statistics ==
As of match played 22 September 2026

Appearances and goals by club, season and competition
Club	Season	League			FA Cup		EFL Cup		Other		Total	
Club	Season	Division	Apps	Goals	Apps	Goals	Apps	Goals	Apps	Goals	Apps	Goals
Reading	2021–22	Championship	1	0	0	0	0	0	—		1	0
Reading	2022–23	Championship	0	0	0	0	0	0	—		0	0
Reading	Total		1	0	0	0	0	0	—		1	0
Ebbsfleet United	2023–24	National League	0	0	—		—		—		0	0
Bishop's Stortford	2024–25	SFL Premier Division Central	30	4	3	1	—		2 (Note: Appearances in FA Trophy)	2	35	7
Dagenham & Redbridge	2025–26	National League	22	0	1	0	—		1	0	24	0
Chippenham Town (loan)	2025–26	National League South	5	0	—		—		—		5	0
Farnborough	2026–27	National League South	6	0	2	0	—		0	0	8	0
Salisbury	2026–27	National League South	0	0	—		—		0	0	0	0
Career total			64	4	6	1	0	0	3	2	73	7
