= Lynford Sackey =

English footballer

Personal information
- Full name: Lynford Sackey
- Date of birth: 18 February 2003 (age 23)
- Height: 5 ft 11 in (1.80 m)
- Positions: Right winger; right back

Team information
- Current team: Knaphill

Youth career
- –2020: Reading

Senior career*
Years	Team	Apps	(Gls)
2020–2022	Reading	0	(0)
2022–2023	Bolton Wanderers	0	(0)
2023	Risborough Rangers	1	(0)
2023	Sholing	1	(0)
2024	Berkhamsted	2	(0)
2024–2025	Holyport	17	(5)
2025	Binfield	1	(0)
2025	Knaphill	8	(2)
2025–2026	Yateley United	19	(14)
2026	Bracknell Town	7	(0)
2026	→ Knaphill (dual-registration)	2	(0)
2026–	Knaphill	4	(1)
- * Club domestic league appearances and goals as of 11:42, 3 November 2026 (UTC)

Lynford Sackey (born 18 February 2003) is an English professional footballer who plays as a right winger or right back for Knaphill.

== Club career ==
He made his debut for Reading on 15 September 2020 in a 1–0 EFL Cup defeat at home to Luton Town. In summer 2021, Sackey agreed his first professional contract with the club. On 20 May 2022, Reading confirmed that Sackey would leave the club upon the expiration of his contract. On 17 June 2022, it was announced Sackey would join Bolton Wanderers upon the expiry of his Reading contract and link up with Bolton's B team. He was released at the end of the 2022–23 season.

Following a spell with Risborough Rangers, Sackey joined Southern League Premier Division South club Sholing on 18 November 2023. He signed for Southern League Division One Central side Berkhamsted on 5 January 2024, before later featuring for Holyport and Binfield. In July 2025, he joined Combined Counties Premier Division South side Knaphill.

On 24 July 2026, after a spell with Wessex League side Yateley United, Sackey joined Bracknell Town, reuniting with manager Adam Hopkins, who had also made the move from Yateley United to Bracknell Town. In September 2026, Sackey dual-registered with his former club Knaphill, featuring in their 1–0 home victory over Abbey Rangers. On 13 October 2026, it was announced that Sackey was no longer apart of the Bracknell Town first-team squad and ultimately had left the club.

On 14 October 2026, it was confirmed that Sackey had returned to Knaphill permanently following his departure from Bracknell Town.

== International career ==
Born in England, Sackey is of Ghanaian descent. He has been involved in training camps for England youth sides.

== Career statistics ==
As of match played 31 October 2026

Appearances and goals by club, season and competition
Club	Season	League			FA Cup		EFL Cup		Other		Total	
Club	Season	Division	Apps	Goals	Apps	Goals	Apps	Goals	Apps	Goals	Apps	Goals
Reading	2020–21	Championship	0	0	0	0	1	0	—		1	0
Reading	2021–22	Championship	0	0	0	0	1	0	—		1	0
Reading	Total		0	0	0	0	2	0	—		2	0
Bolton Wanderers	2022–23	League One	0	0	0	0	0	0	0	0	0	0
Risborough Rangers	2023–24	Combined Counties League Premier Division North	1	0	—		—		1 (Note: Appearance in the FA Vase)	0	2	0
Sholing	2023–24	Southern League Premier Division South	1	0	—		—		—		1	0
Berkhamsted	2023–24	Southern League Premier Division Central	2	0	—		—		—		2	0
Holyport	2024–25	Combined Counties League Premier Division North	17	5	0	0	—		2 (Note: One appearance and two goals in the FA Vase, one appearance in the Combined Counties League Challenge Cup)	2	19	7
Binfield	2024–25	Isthmian League South Central Division	1	0	—		—		—		1	0
Knaphill	2025–26	Combined Counties League Premier Division South	8	2	4	1	—		2 (Note: One appearance and one goal in the FA Vase, one appearance in the Combined Counties League Challenge Cup)	1	14	4
Yateley United	2025–26	Wessex League Division One	19	14	—		—		2 (Note: Appearances in the Wessex League Division One play-offs)	2	21	16
Bracknell Town	2026–27	Southern League Premier Division South	7	0	1	0	—		1 (Note: Appearance in the FA Trophy)	0	9	0
Knaphill (dual-reg.)	2026–27	Combined Counties League Premier Division South	2	0	—		—		0	0	2	0
Knaphill	2026–27	Combined Counties League Premier Division South	4	1	—		—		0	0	4	1
Career total			62	22	5	1	2	0	8	5	77	28
