= Karl Hein (footballer) =

Estonian footballer (born 2002)

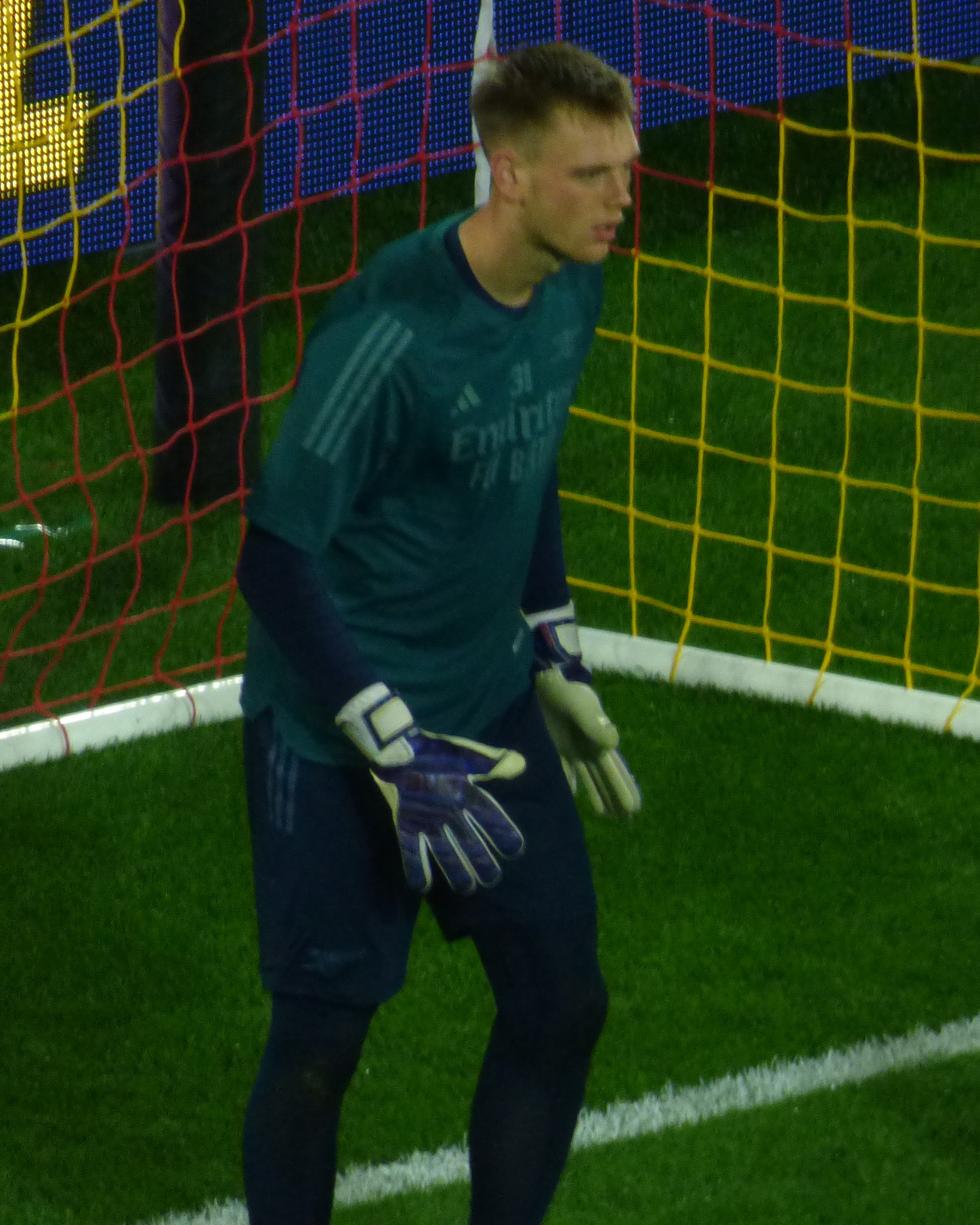
- Hein playing for Arsenal in 2023

Personal information
- Full name: Karl Jakob Hein
- Date of birth: 13 April 2002 (age 24)
- Place of birth: Põlva, Estonia
- Height: 1.93 m (6 ft 4 in)
- Position: Goalkeeper

Team information
- Current team: Werder Bremen
- Number: 1

Youth career
- 2010–2015: Loo
- 2015–2018: Nõmme United
- 2018–2022: Arsenal

Senior career*
Years	Team	Apps	(Gls)
2018	Nõmme United	5	(0)
2018–2026	Arsenal	0	(0)
2022	→ Reading (loan)	5	(0)
2024–2025	→ Valladolid (loan)	31	(0)
2025–2026	→ Werder Bremen (loan)	2	(0)
2026–	Werder Bremen	8	(0)

International career^{‡}
2017–2018	Estonia U17	14	(0)
2019	Estonia U19	3	(0)
2019	Estonia U21	2	(0)
2020–	Estonia	51	(0)
- * Club domestic league appearances and goals as of 17:30, 31 October 2026 (UTC) ‡ National team caps and goals as of 19:35, 16 November 2026 (UTC)

Karl Jakob Hein (born 13 April 2002) is an Estonian professional footballer who plays as a goalkeeper for Bundesliga club Werder Bremen and the Estonia national team.

== Club career ==
=== Nõmme United ===
Hein began his youth career at JK Loo at the age of eight, before moving to the youth team of Nõmme United in 2015. He made five senior appearances for Nõmme United in the Estonian third tier, Esiliiga B, before joining the academy of English club Arsenal in May 2018.

=== Arsenal ===
Hein signed his first professional contract with the club in May 2019. He appeared in the Arsenal squad as an unused substitute for the first time on 29 October 2020, in the Europa League match against Dundalk.

After playing for the Arsenal first-team in the 2021–22 pre-season, including his non-competitive debut against Hibernian, Hein signed a new long-term contract with Arsenal on 17 September 2021.

On 10 November 2022, Hein made his debut for the Arsenal first-team in the EFL Cup third round against Brighton & Hove Albion at the Emirates Stadium, conceding a foul in the penalty area and the resulting spot-kick against Danny Welbeck as Arsenal lost 3–1.

==== Loan to Reading ====
On 24 January 2022, Reading announced the signing of Hein on loan from Arsenal until the end of the 2021–22 season.

==== Loan to Valladolid ====
On 13 August 2024, Hein completed a season-long loan move to newly promoted La Liga side Real Valladolid.

Hein and Valladolid started the season with a clean-sheet and a 1–0 victory over Espanyol.

=== Werder Bremen ===
On 22 August 2025, Hein completed a season-long loan move to Bundesliga side Werder Bremen.

On 26 September, Hein made his Bundesliga debut for Werder Bremen in a 4–0 away defeat to Bayern Munich. Despite conceding four goals, he was praised for his performance, with Bremen's managing director Clemens Fritz describing it as “top-notch” and the club captain Marco Friedl naming him their best player on the day.

On 22 May 2026, Werder exercised their option to make the transfer permanent.

== International career ==
Hein was capped by Estonia at under-17, under-19 and under-21 level. He made his international debut for the Estonia national team on 5 September 2020, in a 0–1 loss against Georgia in the UEFA Nations League. Since his debut, Hein has become a regular starter for Estonia.

== Career statistics ==
=== Club ===
As of match played 31 October 2026

Appearances and goals by club, season and competition
Club	Season	League			National cup		League cup		Europe		Other		Total	
Club	Season	Division	Apps	Goals	Apps	Goals	Apps	Goals	Apps	Goals	Apps	Goals	Apps	Goals
Nõmme United	2018	Esiliiga B	5	0	0	0	—		—		—		5	0
Arsenal U21	2020–21	—	—		—		—		—		1 (Note: Appearance(s) in EFL Trophy)	0	1	0
Arsenal U21	2021–22	—	—		—		—		—		1	0	1	0
Arsenal U21	2022–23	—	—		—		—		—		1	0	1	0
Arsenal U21	2023–24	—	—		—		—		—		1	0	1	0
Arsenal U21	Total		—		—		—		—		4	0	4	0
Arsenal	2021–22	Premier League	0	0	0	0	0	0	0	0	0	0	0	0
Arsenal	2022–23	Premier League	0	0	0	0	1	0	0	0	—		1	0
Arsenal	2023–24	Premier League	0	0	0	0	0	0	0	0	0	0	0	0
Arsenal	Total		0	0	0	0	1	0	0	0	0	0	1	0
Reading (loan)	2021–22	Championship	5	0	0	0	0	0	—		—		5	0
Real Valladolid (loan)	2024–25	La Liga	31	0	1	0	—		—		—		32	0
Werder Bremen (loan)	2025–26	Bundesliga	2	0	0	0	—		—		—		2	0
Werder Bremen	2026–27	Bundesliga	8	0	1	0	—		—		—		9	0
Career total			51	0	2	0	1	0	0	0	4	0	57	0

=== International ===
As of match played 16 November 2026

Appearances and goals by national team and year
National team	Year	Apps	Goals
Estonia	2020	6	0
Estonia	2021	6	0
Estonia	2022	6	0
Estonia	2023	9	0
Estonia	2024	9	0
Estonia	2025	8	0
Estonia	2026	7	0
Total		51	0

== Honours ==
International

- Baltic Cup: 2020, 2024

Individual

- Estonian Footballer of the Year: 2025
- Estonian Young Footballer of the Year: 2020, 2021, 2024
