= Terell Thomas =

English footballer (born 1995)

Personal information
- Full name: Terell Mondasia Thomas
- Date of birth: 18 October 1995 (age 31)
- Place of birth: Rainham, England
- Height: 6 ft 3 in (1.90 m)
- Position: Defender

Team information
- Current team: Slough Town

Youth career
- –2009: Arsenal
- 2009–2014: Charlton Athletic

Senior career*
Years	Team	Apps	(Gls)
2014–2017	Charlton Athletic	0	(0)
2015–2016	→ Woking (loan)	12	(0)
2016–2017	→ Woking (loan)	30	(3)
2017–2018	Wigan Athletic	3	(0)
2017–2018	→ Sutton United (loan)	19	(1)
2018–2021	AFC Wimbledon	73	(1)
2021–2022	Crewe Alexandra	13	(0)
2022	Reading	2	(0)
2022–2024	Charlton Athletic	55	(1)
2024–2026	Carlisle United	62	(2)
2026–	Slough Town	0	(0)

International career^{‡}
2022–	Saint Lucia	19	(1)
- * Club domestic league appearances and goals as of 17:08, 9 October 2026 (UTC) ‡ National team caps and goals as of 24 March 2026

Terell Mondasia Thomas (born 18 October 1995) is a professional footballer who plays as a defender for National League South club Slough Town. Born in England, he plays for the Saint Lucia national team.

Thomas started at Arsenal before signing his first professional contract in June 2015 with Charlton Athletic. He went on to enjoy two loan spells at National League side Woking. He was released in June 2017, and joined fellow League One side Wigan Athletic. Thomas was then subsequently sent out on loan to Sutton United until the end of the 2017–18 campaign. Thomas signed permanently for AFC Wimbledon in the summer of 2018, prior to the Dons' third consecutive League One campaign.

== Club career ==
=== Charlton Athletic ===
After joining Charlton Athletic as a teenager from Arsenal, Thomas become a key figure in Charlton's academy side. After appearing as an unused substitute several times throughout the 2014–15 campaign, he signed a new two-year contract running until June 2017.

==== Woking (loan spells) ====
On 31 August 2015, Thomas joined National League side Woking on a one-month youth loan deal, making his professional debut the same day in Woking's 2–0 home victory against Welling United, playing the full 90 minutes. After impressing at Woking, Thomas' loan spell was extended until 2 January 2016. However, with Woking, struggling through October and November, Thomas was dropped and played just one further game before returning to Charlton in January.

On 20 October 2016, Thomas returned to Woking on a one-month loan to help the Cards in their relegation battle. Two days later, Thomas made his return in Woking's 1–1 home draw with high-flying Barrow, playing for 70 minutes before being replaced by Fabio Saraiva. On 21 January 2017, after stabilising the Woking defence, his loan spell was extended until the end of the 2016–17 season. On 14 February, Thomas scored his first professional goal in Woking's 2–1 home victory over Solihull Moors, heading in from a corner to give the Cards a 1–0 lead. On 25 February 2017, Thomas scored his second goal of the season in a 4–3 away defeat against Forest Green Rovers, netting a consolation in the 94th minute. Following a successful relegation fight, Thomas returned to Charlton after featuring 33 times and scoring three goals for the Cards.

=== Wigan Athletic ===
Following his release from Charlton, Thomas joined fellow League One side Wigan Athletic on a one-year deal on 16 June 2017. On 5 August 2017, Thomas made his Football League debut during Wigan's 1–0 away victory against Milton Keynes Dons, replacing Nick Powell at half-time. Three days later, he made his first start for Wigan in an EFL Cup tie against Blackpool, featuring for 65 minutes in the 2–1 home victory.

==== Sutton United (loan spell) ====
On 29 December 2017, Thomas returned to the National League, joining Sutton United on a 28-day loan deal. A day later, he made his Sutton debut in their 1–0 away defeat against league leaders Macclesfield Town, playing the full 90 minutes. On 31 January 2018, Thomas' loan with Sutton was extended until the end of the season. On 24 February 2018, Thomas scored his first goal for the club during their 4–0 victory over Guiseley, stabbing home an effort after a mistake from goalkeeper, Luke Coddington.

Following an impressive loan spell at Sutton, Wigan triggered a one-year option in Thomas's current deal, extending his contract until June 2019.

=== AFC Wimbledon ===
On 16 July 2018, despite signing a new one-year deal with Wigan, Thomas made the switch to League One side AFC Wimbledon for an undisclosed fee. On 4 September 2018 Thomas made his Dons debut in a 2–2 draw against Charlton Athletic in the EFL Trophy at The Valley. On 3 November 2018 Thomas made his league debut for the Dons in a 2–1 loss to Shrewsbury Town at Kingsmeadow. He scored his first goal for Wimbledon in a 1–0 win over Portsmouth on 19 October 2019.

During July 2021, it was confirmed by manager, Mark Robinson that Thomas would leave the club at the end of his contract, following interest from Championship and fellow League One clubs.

=== Crewe Alexandra ===
On 12 August 2021, Thomas signed a 12-month contract at League One side Crewe Alexandra, replacing Crewe signing Tommie Hoban after he had announced his surprise retirement from professional football. Thomas made his Crewe debut on 17 August 2021 in a 1–0 defeat at Oxford United, conceding the penalty that gave the home side victory. On 31 January 2022, after Thomas had made 19 appearances, it was announced that his contract had been terminated by mutual consent.

=== Reading ===
On 24 March 2022, Thomas joined Reading on a deal until the end of the season after impressing on trial. On 20 May 2022, Reading confirmed that Thomas would leave the club upon the expiration of his contract.

=== Return to Charlton Athletic ===
On 7 September 2022, Thomas returned to Charlton Athletic on a one-year deal.

On 28 June 2023, it was reported that Thomas had signed a new one-year contract with Charlton ahead of the 2023–24 season.

On 3 May 2024, it was confirmed that Thomas would leave Charlton Athletic when his contract expired.

=== Carlisle United ===
On 17 June 2024, Thomas joined Carlisle United on a free transfer, signing a two-year deal. He became a regular, even through a injury hit spell. He left at the end of his contract in the summer of 2026.

=== Slough Town ===
On 9 October 2026, Thomas joined National League South club Slough Town.

== International career ==
In June 2022, Thomas was called up to the Saint Lucia squad for the CONCACAF Nations League games against Dominica and Anguilla.

Thomas scored his first international goal for Saint Lucia on 19 November 2023, in a 2–1 defeat to Sint Maarten.

== Career statistics ==
As of match played 1 October 2025

Appearances and goals by club, season and competition
Club	Season	League			FA Cup		League Cup		Other		Total	
Club	Season	Division	Apps	Goals	Apps	Goals	Apps	Goals	Apps	Goals	Apps	Goals
Charlton Athletic	2014–15	Championship	0	0	0	0	0	0	—		0	0
Charlton Athletic	2015–16	Championship	0	0	—		0	0	—		0	0
Charlton Athletic	2016–17	League One	0	0	—		0	0	0	0	0	0
Charlton Athletic	Total		0	0	0	0	0	0	0	0	0	0
Woking (loan)	2015–16	National League	12	0	1	0	—		0	0	13	0
Woking (loan)	2016–17	National League	30	3	2	0	—		1 (Note: Appearance(s) in FA Trophy)	0	33	3
Woking (loan)	Total		42	3	3	0	—		1	0	46	3
Wigan Athletic	2017–18	League One	3	0	0	0	2	0	3 (Note: Appearance(s) in Football League Trophy)	0	8	0
Sutton United (loan)	2017–18	National League	19	1	—		—		2 (Note: One appearance in FA Trophy, one in National League play-offs)	0	21	1
AFC Wimbledon	2018–19	League One	23	0	3	0	0	0	3	0	29	0
AFC Wimbledon	2019–20	League One	31	1	2	0	1	0	2	0	36	1
AFC Wimbledon	2020–21	League One	19	0	2	0	1	0	3	1	25	1
AFC Wimbledon	Total		73	1	7	0	2	0	8	1	90	2
Crewe Alexandra	2021–22	League One	13	0	1	0	1	0	4	0	19	0
Reading	2021–22	Championship	2	0	0	0	0	0	—		2	0
Charlton Athletic	2022–23	League One	15	1	1	0	0	0	2 (Note: Two appearances in the EFL Trophy)	0	18	1
Charlton Athletic	2023–24	League One	40	0	1	0	1	0	1 (Note: One appearance in the EFL Trophy)	0	43	0
Charlton Athletic	Total		55	1	2	0	1	0	3	0	61	1
Carlisle United	2024–25	League Two	32	1	1	0	1	0	0	0	34	1
Carlisle United	2025–26	National League	13	1	0	0	—		0	0	13	1
Carlisle United	Total		45	2	1	0	1	0	0	0	47	2
Career total			252	8	14	0	7	0	21	1	294	9

=== International ===
As of match played 10 June 2025

National team	Year	Apps	Goals
Saint Lucia
Saint Lucia	2022	2	0
Saint Lucia	2023	9	1
Saint Lucia	2024	5	0
Saint Lucia	2025	2	0
Total		18	1

Scores and results list Saint Lucia's goal tally first, score column indicates score after each Thomas goal.

List of international goals scored by Terell Thomas
No.	Date	Venue	Opponent	Score	Result	Competition	Ref.
1	19 November 2023	Daren Sammy Cricket Ground, Gros Islet, Saint Lucia	Sint Maarten	1–0	1–2	2023–24 CONCACAF Nations League B	
