= Tyrell Ashcroft =

English footballer

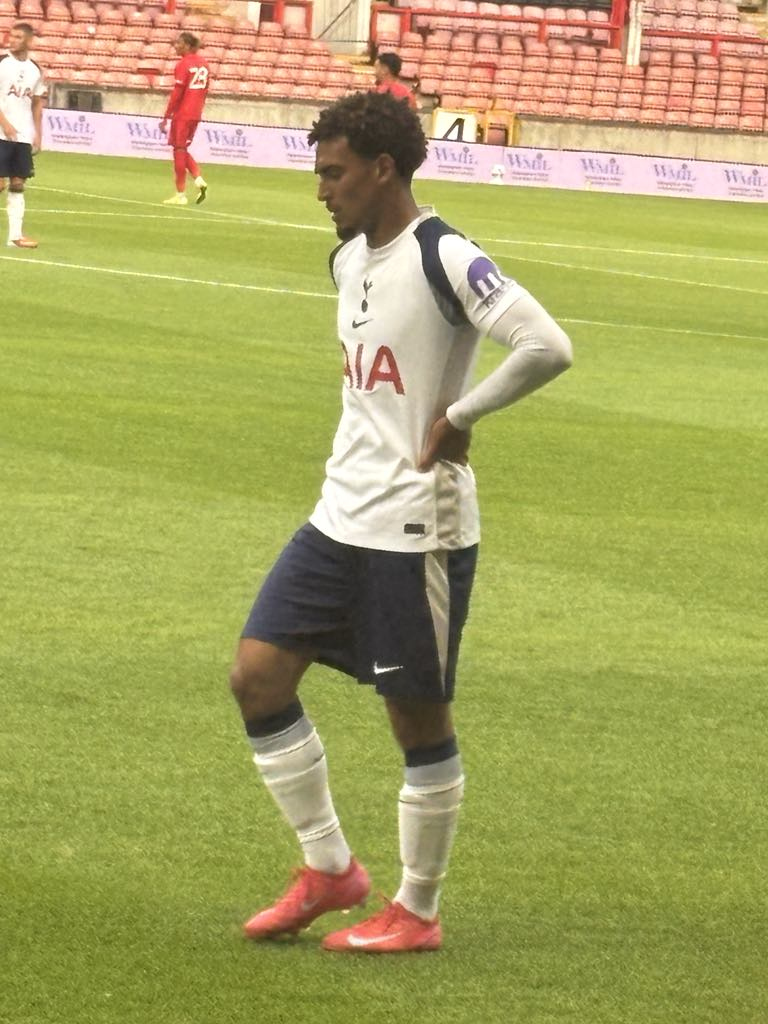
- Tyrell Ashcroft in 2025

Personal information
- Full name: Tyrell Dean Ashcroft
- Date of birth: 7 July 2004 (age 22)
- Place of birth: Frimley, England
- Height: 1.80 m (5 ft 11 in)
- Position: Defender

Youth career
- 2018–2022: Reading
- 2022–: Tottenham Hotspur

Senior career*
| Years | Team | Apps | (Gls) |
| 2021–2022 | Reading | 4 | (0) |
| 2022–2026 | Tottenham Hotspur | 0 | (0) |
- * Club domestic league appearances and goals as of 18 August 2026 (UTC)

Tyrell Dean Ashcroft (born 7 July 2004) is an English professional footballer who played as a defender, most recently for Premier League club Tottenham Hotspur.

== Career ==
Ashcroft came through the youth system at Reading, and made his professional debut for the club in a 1–0 EFL Championship loss to Millwall on 2 November 2021. He finished the 2021–22 season with four starts for the club, and was named on the bench 11 times.

On 1 July 2022, Tottenham Hotspur announced the signing of Ashcroft to their academy. On 10 June 2026, Tottenham announced that Ashcroft would leave the club at the end of his contract on 30 June 2026.

== Career statistics ==
=== Club ===
As of match played 30 August 2022

Appearances and goals by club, season and competition
| Club | Season | League | | | National Cup | | League Cup | | Continental | | Other | | Total | |
| Club | Season | Division | Apps | Goals | Apps | Goals | Apps | Goals | Apps | Goals | Apps | Goals | Apps | Goals |
|---|---|---|---|---|---|---|---|---|---|---|---|---|---|---|
| Reading | 2021–22 | EFL Championship | 4 | 0 | 0 | 0 | 0 | 0 | — | | | | 4 | 0 |
| Tottenham Hotspur U-21 | 2022-23 | — | | | — | | — | | - | | 1 (Note: Appearances in EFL Trophy) | 0 | 1 | 0 |
| Tottenham Hotspur | 2022–23 | Premier League | 0 | 0 | 0 | 0 | 0 | 0 | — | | | | 0 | 0 |
| Career total | | | 4 | 0 | 0 | 0 | 0 | 0 | 0 | 0 | 1 | 0 | 5 | 0 |
