= Michael Stickland =

English footballer

Personal information
- Full name: Michael George Stickland
- Date of birth: 9 November 2003 (age 23)
- Place of birth: Surrey, England
- Height: 1.85 m (6 ft 1 in)
- Position: Centre-back

Team information
- Current team: Aldershot Town
- Number: 12

Youth career
- –2021: Reading

Senior career*
Years	Team	Apps	(Gls)
2021–2026	Reading	10	(0)
2026	→ Farnborough (loan)	14	(1)
2026–	Aldershot Town	0	(0)
- * Club domestic league appearances and goals as of 07:10, 6 May 2026 (UTC)

Michael George Stickland (born 9 November 2003) is an English professional footballer who plays as a centre-back for National League club Aldershot Town.

== Career ==
=== Reading ===
Stickland made his professional debut with Reading in a 3–0 EFL Cup loss to Swansea City on 10 August 2021. On 24 June 2025, Stickland signed a new one-year contract with Reading.

On 21 February 2026, Stickland joined National League South club, Farnborough on a one-month loan deal. On 18 April 2026, Reading decided to recall Stickland from his loan at Farnborough. He returned to Berkshire after making 14 appearances and scoring once during his two-month stint with the club.

On 5 May 2026, Reading announced that Stickland would leave the club once his contract expires on 30 June 2026.

=== Aldershot Town ===
On 15 May 2026, Stickland agreed to join National League club Aldershot Town.

== Career statistics ==
=== Club ===
As of match played 11 April 2026

Appearances and goals by club, season and competition
Club	Season	League			FA Cup		EFL Cup		Other		Total	
Club	Season	Division	Apps	Goals	Apps	Goals	Apps	Goals	Apps	Goals	Apps	Goals
Reading	2021–22	Championship	1	0	1	0	1	0	—		3	0
Reading	2022–23	Championship	0	0	0	0	0	0	—		0	0
Reading	2023–24	League One	0	0	0	0	0	0	1 (Note: Appearances in EFL Trophy)	0	1	0
Reading	2024–25	League One	5	0	0	0	0	0	1	0	6	0
Reading	2025–26	League One	4	0	1	0	3	0	3	0	11	0
Reading	Total		10	0	2	0	4	0	5	0	21	0
Farnborough (loan)	2025–26	National League South	14	1	—		—		—		14	1
Career total			24	1	2	0	4	0	5	0	35	1
