= Dejan Tetek =

Serbian footballer

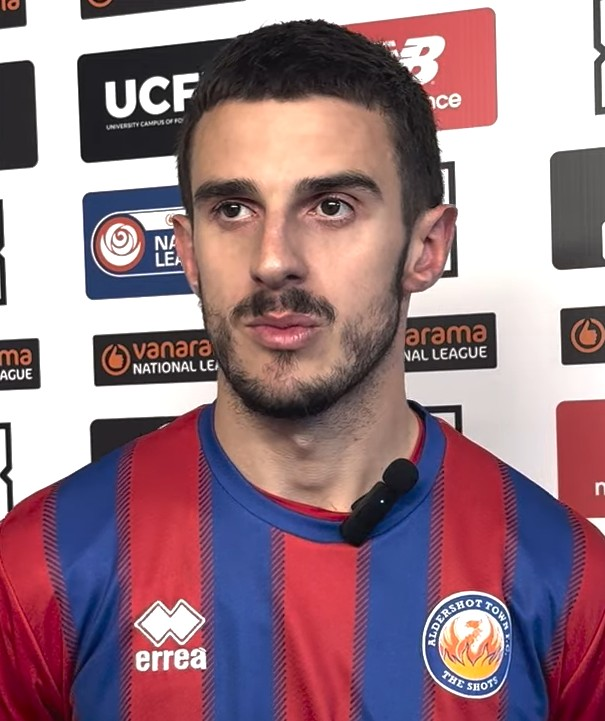
- Tetek in May 2025

Personal information
- Full name: Dejan Tetek
- Date of birth: 24 September 2002 (age 24)
- Place of birth: Oxford, England
- Height: 5 ft 11 in (1.81 m)
- Position: Midfielder

Team information
- Current team: Oxford City
- Number: 8

Youth career
- –2020: Reading

Senior career*
Years	Team	Apps	(Gls)
2020–2023	Reading	17	(0)
2023–2026	Aldershot Town	65	(2)
2026-	Oxford City	0	(0)

International career^{‡}
2019	England U18	3	(1)
2021	Serbia U19	1	(0)
2021	Serbia U21	5	(0)
- * Club domestic league appearances and goals as of 19:58, 24 August 2026 (UTC) ‡ National team caps and goals as of 7 September 2021

Dejan Tetek (Serbian Cyrillic: Дејан Тетек; born 24 September 2002) is a footballer who plays as a midfielder for English National League North club Oxford City. Born in England, he represents Serbia at youth international level.

== Club career ==
=== Reading ===
Born in Oxford, Tetek made his debut for Reading on 15 September 2020 as a substitute in a 1–0 EFL Cup defeat to Luton Town. He made his league debut on 3 October 2020 as a substitute in a 1–0 victory at home to Watford. On 17 May 2023, Reading confirmed that Tetek would leave the club at the end of his contract.

=== Aldershot Town ===
On 20 October 2023, Tetek joined National League club Aldershot Town on an initial short-term deal. He made his club debut the following day as a 72nd minute substitute for Theo Widdrington in a 2–1 victory at home against Hartlepool United. On 27 April 2026, it was announced that Tetek would leave the club at the end of his contract in June.

== International career ==
Born in England, Tetek is of Serbian descent. He was called up to the England under-18 squad in October 2019. He has made 3 appearances for England at under-18 level, scoring once. He was called up to the Serbia under-19 squad in September 2020. Tetek played for 67 minutes whilst making his debut for Serbia U19 against Romania on 10 March 2021. Tetek went on to make his Serbian U21 debut three weeks later, in a 1–0 victory over Turkey on 30 March 2021.

== Career statistics ==
As of match played 25 January 2025

Appearances and goals by club, season and competition
Club	Season	League			FA Cup		League Cup		Other		Total	
Club	Season	Division	Apps	Goals	Apps	Goals	Apps	Goals	Apps	Goals	Apps	Goals
Reading	2020–21	Championship	7	0	1	0	1	0	0	0	9	0
Reading	2021–22	Championship	10	0	1	0	1	0	0	0	12	0
Reading	2022–23	Championship	0	0	0	0	0	0	0	0	0	0
Reading	Total		17	0	2	0	2	0	0	0	21	0
Aldershot Town	2023–24	National League	15	0	1	0	-		0	0	16	0
Aldershot Town	2024–25	National League	18	1	1	0	-		5	1	24	2
Aldershot Town	Total		33	1	2	0	-		5	1	40	2
Career total			50	1	4	0	2	0	5	1	61	2

== Honours ==
Aldershot Town

- FA Trophy: 2024–25
