= 2017–18 Premier League International Cup =

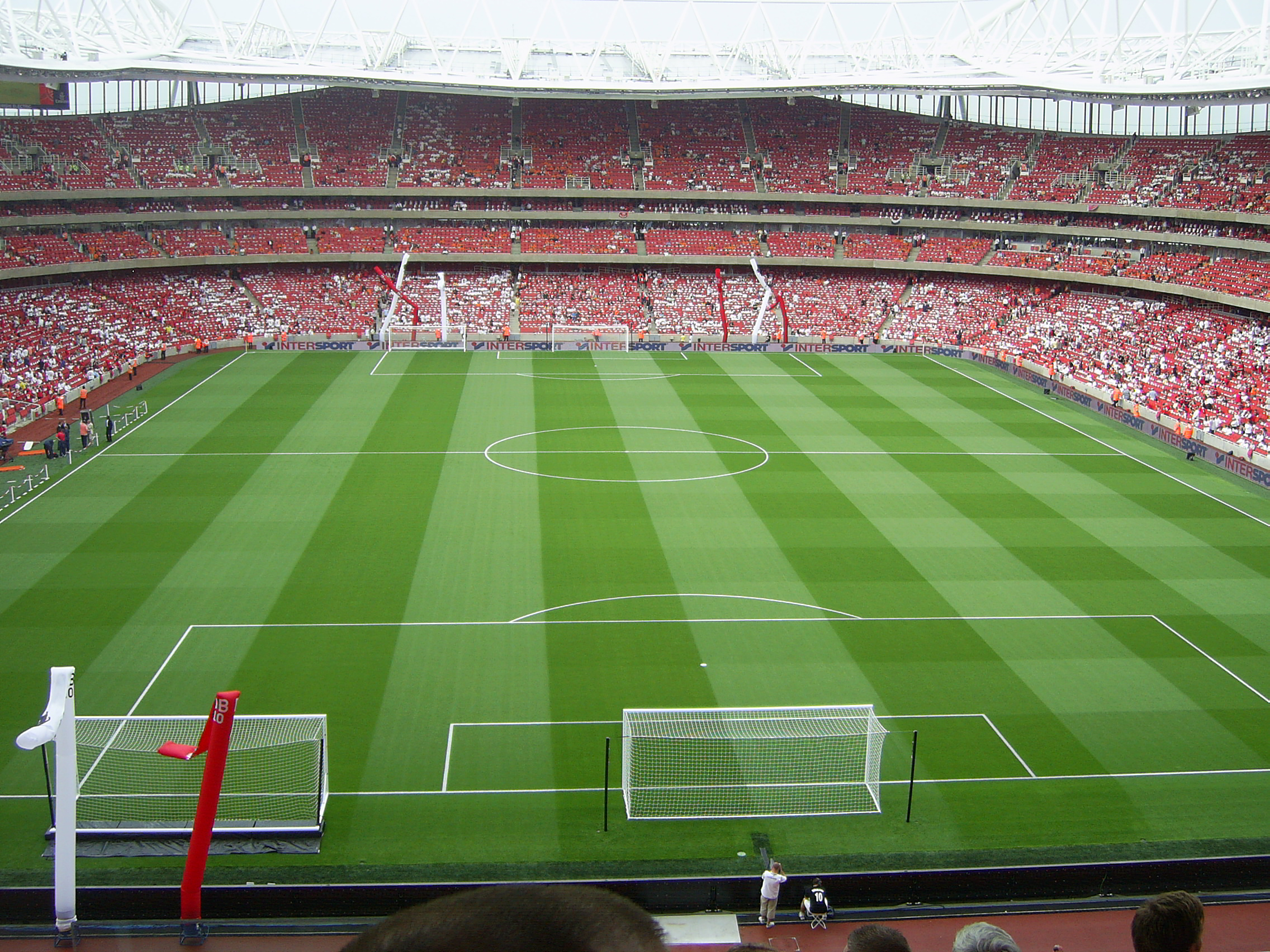
- The Emirates Stadium in Highbury, London hosted the final

Tournament details
- Dates: 31 August 2017 – 8 May 2018
- Teams: 24 (from 9 associations)

Final positions
- Champions: (Portugal) Porto (2nd title)
- Runners-up: (England) Arsenal (1st Runner Up)

Tournament statistics
- Matches played: 43
- Goals scored: 123 (2.86 per match)
- Top scorer(s): (England) James Wilson Manchester United (Spain) Adrián Dalmau Villarreal (5 goals)

The 2017–18 Premier League International Cup was the fourth season of the Premier League International Cup, a European club football competition organised by the Premier League for under-23 players. Porto defended the title by defeating Arsenal 1–0 in the final.

== Format ==
The competition featured twenty-four teams: twelve from English league system and twelve invitees from other European countries. The teams were split into six groups of four - with two English league clubs per group. The group winners, and two best runners-up, progressed into the knockout phase of the tournament. The knockout matches were single leg fixtures.

All matches - including fixtures between non-English teams - were played in England and Wales.

=== Teams ===
English league system:

- (England) Arsenal
- (England) Derby County
- (England) Everton
- (England) Leicester City
- (England) Liverpool
- (England) Manchester United
- (England) Newcastle United
- (England) Reading
- (England) Sunderland
- (England) Tottenham Hotspur
- (England) West Ham United
- (Wales) Swansea City

Other countries:

- (Germany) Bayern Munich
- (Germany) VfL Wolfsburg
- (Germany) Hertha Berlin
- (Spain) Athletic Bilbao
- (Spain) Villarreal
- (Portugal) Porto
- (Portugal) Benfica
- (Scotland) Celtic
- (Croatia) Dinamo Zagreb
- (Poland) Legia Warsaw
- (Netherlands) PSV Eindhoven
- (Czech Republic) Sparta Prague

== Group stage ==
Color key in group tables
Group winners and the two best runners-up advance to the quarterfinals

=== Group A ===
| Team | Pld | W | D | L | GF | GA | GD | Pts |
|---|---|---|---|---|---|---|---|---|
| (England) Liverpool | 3 | 2 | 0 | 1 | 5 | 2 | +3 | 6 |
| (England) Newcastle United | 3 | 2 | 0 | 1 | 6 | 4 | +2 | 6 |
| (Czech Republic) Sparta Prague | 3 | 1 | 0 | 2 | 5 | 6 | −1 | 3 |
| (Netherlands) PSV Eindhoven | 3 | 1 | 0 | 2 | 5 | 9 | −4 | 3 |

| 24 October 2017 | Newcastle United (England) | 2–1 | (Czech Republic) Sparta Prague | North Tyneside |
| 19:00 BST (UTC+1) | Brezina , 19' (o.g.); Barlaser 76' | Report | Drchal (pen.), 62' | Stadium: Blue Flames Ground; Attendance: 491; Referee: Matthew Donohue |

| 10 November 2017 | Liverpool (England) | 2–1 | (England) Newcastle United | Birkenhead |
| 19:00 GMT | Virtue 27'; Ejaria 73' | Report 1 Report 2 | Roberts 22' | Stadium: Prenton Park; Referee: Daniel Middleton |

| 28 November 2017 | Liverpool (England) | 0–1 | (Czech Republic) Sparta Prague | Birkenhead |
| 19:00 GMT | | Report 1 Report 2 | Plavšić 86' | Stadium: Prenton Park; Referee: Joe Hull |

| 30 November 2017 | PSV Eindhoven (Netherlands) | 4–3 | (Czech Republic) Sparta Prague | Halewood |
| 19:00 GMT | Malen 2' 61'; Guðmundsson 31'; Lammers 40' | Report 1 Report 2 | Čmelík 16'; Drchal 64'; Köstl 66' | Stadium: Finch Farm |

| 19 December 2017 | Liverpool (England) | 3–0 | (Netherlands) PSV Eindhoven | Birkenhead |
| 19:00 GMT | Brewster 11'; Wilson 24'; Brannagan (penalty missed); Virtue 63' | Report 1 Report 2 | Soulas (red card) | Stadium: Prenton Park; Referee: Joe Hull |

| 24 January 2018 | Newcastle United (England) | 3–1 | (Netherlands) PSV Eindhoven | North Tyneside |
| 19:00 GMT | Gallacher 22'; Fernández 47'; Roberts 79' | Report | Lundqvist 65' | Stadium: Blue Flames Ground; Attendance: 262; Referee: Glen Hart |

=== Group B ===
| Team | Pld | W | D | L | GF | GA | GD | Pts |
|---|---|---|---|---|---|---|---|---|
| (England) Sunderland | 3 | 2 | 1 | 0 | 5 | 1 | +4 | 7 |
| (England) Leicester City | 3 | 1 | 1 | 1 | 5 | 4 | +1 | 4 |
| (Germany) Hertha Berlin | 3 | 1 | 0 | 2 | 2 | 5 | −3 | 3 |
| (Poland) Legia Warsaw | 3 | 0 | 2 | 1 | 3 | 5 | −2 | 2 |

| 27 September 2017 | Leicester City (England) | 3–0 | (Germany) Hertha Berlin | Leicester |
| 19:00 BST (UTC+1) | Hughes 2'; Johnson 40'; Muskwe 47' | Report | | Stadium: King Power Stadium; Attendance: 434; Referee: Peter Wright |

| 10 October 2017 | Sunderland (England) | 2–0 | (Germany) Hertha Berlin | Sunderland |
| 19:00 BST (UTC+1) | McNair 42'; Beadling 90' (pen.) | Report | | Stadium: Stadium of Light; Referee: Thomas Bramall |

| 15 November 2017 | Sunderland (England) | 1–1 | (Poland) Legia Warsaw | Hetton-le-Hole |
| 19:00 GMT | Nelson 87' | Report | Bartczak 33' | Stadium: Eppleton Colliery Welfare Ground; Attendance: 275 |

| 29 November 2017 | Legia Warsaw (Poland) | 0–2 | (Germany) Hertha Berlin | Woking |
| 19:00 GMT | | Report | Kade 64'; Blumberg 88' | Stadium: Kingfield Stadium; Referee: Richard Hulme |

| 14 December 2017 | Leicester City (England) | 2–2 | (Poland) Legia Warsaw | Whetstone |
| 19:00 GMT | Ndukwu 21'; Knight 32' | Report 1 Report 2 | Cichocki 10'; Bondarenko 67' | Stadium: Holmes Park; Attendance: 229; Referee: Andrew Miller |

| 23 January 2018 | Sunderland (England) | 2–0 | (England) Leicester City | Sunderland |
| 19:00 GMT | Connelly 35'; Embleton 43' | Report | | Stadium: Stadium of Light; Referee: Karl Evans |

=== Group C ===
| Team | Pld | W | D | L | GF | GA | GD | Pts |
|---|---|---|---|---|---|---|---|---|
| (Croatia) Dinamo Zagreb | 3 | 2 | 1 | 0 | 4 | 2 | +2 | 7 |
| (England) Derby County | 3 | 1 | 1 | 1 | 1 | 1 | 0 | 4 |
| (Germany) VfL Wolfsburg | 3 | 1 | 0 | 2 | 5 | 5 | 0 | 3 |
| (England) Everton | 3 | 0 | 2 | 1 | 1 | 3 | −2 | 2 |

| 17 October 2017 | Everton (England) | 1–3 | (Germany) VfL Wolfsburg | Southport |
| 19:00 BST (UTC+1) | Mathis 23' | Report | Saglam 59'; El-Haibi 74'; Blaz Kramer 85' | Stadium: Merseyrail Community Stadium; Attendance: 150; Referee: Paul Marsden |

| 1 November 2017 | Derby County (England) | 1–0 | (Germany) VfL Wolfsburg | Derby |
| 19:00 GMT | Franke , 75' (o.g.) | Report | | Stadium: Pride Park Stadium |

| 29 November 2017 | Dinamo Zagreb (Croatia) | 3–2 | (Germany) VfL Wolfsburg | Aldershot |
| 19:00 GMT | Knežević 39'; Miklić 58'; Stolnik 68' (pen.) | Report | Möbius 11'; Kramer 63' | Stadium: Electric Services Stadium |

| 5 December 2017 | Derby County (England) | 0–0 | (England) Everton | Derby |
| 19:00 GMT | | Report 1 Report 2 | | Stadium: Pride Park Stadium; Referee: Simon Barrow |

| 15 December 2017 | Everton (England) | 0–0 | (Croatia) Dinamo Zagreb | Southport |
| 19:00 GMT | | Report 1 Report 2 | Endri Çekiçi (red card) | Stadium: Merseyrail Community Stadium; Referee: Matt Donohue |

| 19 December 2017 | Derby County (England) | 0–1 | (Croatia) Dinamo Zagreb | Burton-upon-Trent |
| 19:00 GMT | | Report | Ćuže 26' | Stadium: St George's Park |

=== Group D ===
| Team | Pld | W | D | L | GF | GA | GD | Pts |
|---|---|---|---|---|---|---|---|---|
| (England) Manchester United | 3 | 3 | 0 | 0 | 6 | 2 | +4 | 9 |
| (Wales) Swansea City | 3 | 1 | 0 | 2 | 7 | 4 | +3 | 3 |
| (Spain) Athletic Bilbao | 3 | 1 | 0 | 2 | 4 | 4 | 0 | 3 |
| (Scotland) Celtic | 3 | 1 | 0 | 2 | 2 | 9 | −7 | 3 |

| 30 September 2017 | Swansea City (Wales) | 6–0 | (Scotland) Celtic | Landore |
| 14:00 BST (UTC+1) | McBurnie 37'; J. Fulton 49'; Dyer 74' 84'; James 80', 90' | Report | | Stadium: Landore Training Ground |

| 25 October 2017 | Athletic Bilbao (Spain) | 1–2 | (Scotland) Celtic | Woking |
| 19:00 BST (UTC+1) | Vicente 47' | Report; Report 2 Report 3 | Johnston 13'; Bernaola , 58' (o.g.) | Stadium: Kingfield Stadium; Attendance: 250; Referee: Adrian Quelch |

| 4 November 2017 | Manchester United (England) | 2–1 | (Wales) Swansea City | Leigh |
| 14:00 GMT | Wilson 59' (pen.) 67' | Report 1 Report 2 | Gorré 90' (pen.) | Stadium: Leigh Sports Village; Attendance: 1,009; Referee: Johnson |

| 15 November 2017 | Manchester United (England) | 2–1 | (Spain) Athletic Bilbao | Leigh |
| 19:00 GMT | Wilson 48'; McTominay 81' | Report 1 Report 2 Report 3 | Guruzeta 10' | Stadium: Leigh Sports Village; Attendance: 854; Referee: Simeon Lucas |

| 2 December 2017 | Manchester United (England) | 2–0 | (Scotland) Celtic | Leigh |
| 14:00 GMT | Wilson 28' 82' | Report 1 Report 2 Report 3 | | Stadium: Leigh Sports Village; Attendance: 1,016; Referee: David Richardson |

| 20 December 2017 | Swansea City (Wales) | 0–2 | (Spain) Athletic Bilbao | Landore |
| 19:00 GMT | Marić (red card) 90'; Garrick (red card) 90+3' | Report | Vicente 89' 90+1' | Stadium: Landore Training Ground; Referee: Savvas Yianni |

=== Group E ===
| Team | Pld | W | D | L | GF | GA | GD | Pts |
|---|---|---|---|---|---|---|---|---|
| (England) Arsenal | 3 | 2 | 1 | 0 | 6 | 2 | +4 | 7 |
| (Portugal) Porto | 3 | 2 | 0 | 1 | 3 | 1 | +2 | 6 |
| (Germany) Bayern Munich | 3 | 1 | 0 | 2 | 3 | 6 | −3 | 3 |
| (England) Reading | 3 | 0 | 1 | 2 | 0 | 3 | −3 | 1 |

| 22 September 2017 | Reading (England) | 0–2 | (Portugal) Porto | Marchwood |
| 19:00 BST (UTC+1) | | Report 1 Report 2 | Galeno 82'; Pereira 90' (pen.) | Stadium: Staplewood Campus; Attendance: BCD; Referee: Savvas Yianni |

| 17 November 2017 | Arsenal (England) | 1–0 | (Portugal) Porto | Borehamwood |
| 19:00 GMT | Nelson 51' | Report 1 Report 2 | | Stadium: Meadow Park |

| 30 November 2017 | Arsenal (England) | 0–0 | (England) Reading | Borehamwood |
| 19:00 GMT | | Report 1 Report 2 | | Stadium: Meadow Park; Referee: Alan Dale |

| 8 December 2017 | Reading (England) | 0–1 | (Germany) Bayern Munich | High Wycombe |
| 19:00 GMT | | Report | Tarnat 12' | Stadium: Adams Park; Referee: Allan Young |

| 23 January 2018 | Arsenal (England) | 5–2 | (Germany) Bayern Munich | Borehamwood |
| 19:00 GMT | Dragomir 30'; Willock 36'; Osei-Tutu 77'; Reine-Adélaïde 78'; Smith Rowe 84' | Report | Awoudja 48'; Wriedt 60' | Stadium: Meadow Park; Referee: Alan Dale |

| 26 January 2018 | Bayern Munich (Germany) | 0–1 | (Portugal) Porto | Aldershot |
| 19:00 GMT | | Report | Pereira 45+1' (pen.) | Stadium: Electric Services Stadium; Referee: Samuel Allison |

=== Group F ===
| Team | Pld | W | D | L | GF | GA | GD | Pts |
|---|---|---|---|---|---|---|---|---|
| (Spain) Villarreal | 3 | 3 | 0 | 0 | 8 | 2 | +6 | 9 |
| (England) Tottenham Hotspur | 3 | 1 | 1 | 1 | 10 | 7 | +3 | 4 |
| (Portugal) Benfica | 3 | 1 | 1 | 1 | 7 | 6 | +1 | 4 |
| (England) West Ham United | 3 | 0 | 0 | 3 | 2 | 12 | −10 | 0 |

| 31 August 2017 | Tottenham Hotspur (England) | 7–2 | (England) West Ham United | Stevenage |
| 19:00 BST (UTC+1) | Maghoma 11'; Sterling 13', 63'; Pritchard 51'; Shashoua 59', 68'; Duncan 65' | Report 1 Report 2 | Scully 28' (pen.); Martínez 81' (pen.) | Stadium: Broadhall Way; Attendance: 630; Referee: Alan Young |

| 20 September 2017 | Villarreal (Spain) | 3–2 | (Portugal) Benfica | Lancing |
| 19:00 BST (UTC+1) | Moreno 37'; Montolio 86'; Poveda 90' | Report | Tavares 48'; Félix 87' | Stadium: Amex Elite Football Performance Centre; Attendance: 400; Referee: Richard Hulme |

| 4 October 2017 | West Ham United (England) | 0–3 | (Spain) Villarreal | Dagenham |
| 19:00 BST (UTC+1) | | Report | Dalmau 1', 35', 68' | Stadium: Victoria Road |

| 14 November 2017 | Tottenham Hotspur (England) | 0–2 | (Spain) Villarreal | Stevenage |
| 19:00 GMT | | Report | Cedrés 30'; Riera 45' | Stadium: Broadhall Way; Attendance: 503 |

| 21 November 2017 | West Ham United (England) | 0–2 | (Portugal) Benfica | Billericay |
| 19:00 GMT | | Report 1 Report 2 | Júnior 8', 26' | Stadium: AGP Arena |

| 24 January 2018 | Tottenham Hotspur (England) | 3–3 | (Portugal) Benfica | Enfield |
| 19:00 GMT | Tracey 39'; Roles 50'; Walkes 55' | Report | Félix 21'; Tavares 46'; Santos 79' | Stadium: Hotspur Way; Referee: Alan Young |

=== Ranking of second-placed teams ===
| Team | Pld | W | D | L | GF | GA | GD | Pts |
|---|---|---|---|---|---|---|---|---|
| (England) Newcastle United | 3 | 2 | 0 | 1 | 6 | 4 | +2 | 6 |
| (Portugal) Porto | 3 | 2 | 0 | 1 | 3 | 1 | +2 | 6 |
| (England) Tottenham Hotspur | 3 | 1 | 1 | 1 | 10 | 7 | +3 | 4 |
| (England) Leicester City | 3 | 1 | 1 | 1 | 5 | 4 | +1 | 4 |
| (England) Derby County | 3 | 1 | 1 | 1 | 1 | 1 | 0 | 4 |
| (Wales) Swansea City | 3 | 1 | 0 | 2 | 7 | 4 | +3 | 3 |

== Knockout stages ==
Quarter-finals
(England) Arsenal | 2
(Croatia) Dinamo Zagreb | 1
(England) Manchester United | 0
(Spain) Villarreal | 2
(England) Sunderland | 2
(England) Newcastle United | 2 (P)
(England) Liverpool | 1
(Portugal) Porto | 2

Semi-finals
(England) Arsenal | 2 (P)
(Spain) Villarreal | 2
(England) Newcastle United | 0
(Portugal) Porto | 1

Finals
(England) Arsenal | 0
(Portugal) Porto | 1

=== Quarter-finals ===
| 24 February 2018 | Arsenal (England) | 2–1 | (Croatia) Dinamo Zagreb | Borehamwood |
| 14:00 GMT | Willock 28'; Dasilva 89' | Report 1 Report 2 | Miklić 75' | Stadium: Meadow Park; Referee: Daniel Middleton |

| 27 February 2018 | Manchester United (England) | 0–2 | (Spain) Villarreal | Leigh |
| 19:00 GMT | | Report 1 Report 2 | Dalmau 48'; Pedrito 50' | Stadium: Leigh Sports Village; Referee: Peter Gibbons |

| 28 February 2018 | Liverpool (England) | 1–2 | (Portugal) Porto | Leigh |
| 19:00 GMT | Virtue 33' | Report | Costa 58'; Irala 90+6' | Stadium: Leigh Sports Village; Attendance: BCD |

| 7 March 2018 | Sunderland (England) | 2–2 (a.e.t.) (10–11 p) | (England) Newcastle United | Sunderland |
| 19:00 GMT | Gooch 38' (pen.), 69' | Report 1 Report 2 | Good 28'; Roberts 90+2' | Stadium: Stadium of Light |
| | Penalties |
| | Hackett (penalty scored); Embleton (penalty scored); Hume (penalty scored); Molyneux (penalty missed); Diamond (penalty scored); Gamble (penalty scored); Galloway (penalty scored); Robson (penalty scored); Storey (penalty scored); Mbunga-Kimpioka (penalty scored); Stryjek (penalty scored); Hackett (penalty missed) | | (penalty scored) Charman; (penalty scored) Ben El-Mhanni; (penalty scored) Good; (penalty missed) Hunter; (penalty scored) Sangare; (penalty scored) Fernández; (penalty scored) Gallagher; (penalty scored) Smith; (penalty scored) Newberry; (penalty scored) Yarney; (penalty scored) Woolston; (penalty scored) Charman |

=== Semi-finals ===
| 10 April 2018 | Arsenal (England) | 2–2 (a.e.t.) (5–4 p) | (Spain) Villarreal | Holloway |
| 19:00 BST | John-Jules 8'; Gilmour 19' (pen.) | Report 1 Report 2 | Dalmau 21'; Franquesa 40' | Stadium: Emirates Stadium; Attendance: 1,561; Referee: Alan Young |
| | Penalties |
| | Gilmour (penalty scored); Dasilva (penalty scored); Fortune (penalty scored); Willock (penalty scored); Medley (penalty scored) | | (penalty scored) Quintillà; (penalty scored) Ibiza; (penalty scored) Chuca; (penalty missed) Mesa; (penalty scored) Pedrito |

| 12 April 2018 | Newcastle United (England) | 0–1 | (Portugal) Porto | Newcastle upon Tyne |
| 19:00 BST | | Report 1 Report 2 Report 3 | Reabciuk 89' | Stadium: St James' Park; Attendance: 1,237; Referee: Peter Wright |

=== Final ===
| 8 May 2018 | Arsenal (England) | 0–1 | (Portugal) Porto | Holloway |
| 19:00 BST (UTC+1) | | Report 1 Report 2 | Queta 10' | Stadium: Emirates Stadium; Attendance: 1,662; Referee: Thomas Bramall |
