= 2015–16 Hertha BSC season =

Hertha BSC
2015–16 season
- Sporting Director: Michael Preetz
- Head coach: Pál Dárdai
- Stadium: Olympic Stadium
- Bundesliga: 7th
- DFB-Pokal: Semi-finals
- Top goalscorer: League: Salomon Kalou (14); All: Salomon Kalou (17)
Home colours	Away colours	Third colours

The 2015–16 Hertha BSC season was the 123rd season in club history.

== Background ==
=== Background information ===
Hertha BSC finished the 2014–15 Bundesliga in fifteenth place, thus ensuring a place in the 2015–16 Bundesliga. It was confirmed on May 25, 2015, that Pál Dárdai will continue his role as Hertha's head coach for this season.

== Transfers ==
=== In ===
Pos.	Name	Age	Moving from	Type	Transfer Window	Contract ends	Transfer fee	Ref.
MF	(Germany) Niklas Stark	20	1. FC Nürnberg	Transfer	Summer	2019	Undisclosed	
MF	(Czech Republic) Vladimír Darida	24	SC Freiburg	Transfer	Summer	2019	Undisclosed	
MF	(Germany) Sinan Kurt	19	Bayern Munich	Transfer	Winter	2019	Undisclosed	
FW	(Bosnia and Herzegovina) Vedad Ibišević	31	VfB Stuttgart	Transfer	Summer		Undisclosed	
MF	(Germany) Mitchell Weiser	21	Bayern Munich	Transfer	Summer	2018	Undisclosed	
GK	(Germany) Nils Körber	18	Hertha BSC Youth	Transfer	Summer	2017	–	

=== Out ===
Pos.	Name	Age	Moving to	Type	Transfer Window	Transfer fee	Ref.
MF	(Germany) Marcel Ndjeng	32	SC Paderborn	Transfer	Summer	Undisclosed	
DF	(Netherlands) John Heitinga	31	Ajax Amsterdam	Transfer	Summer	Undisclosed	
MF	(Germany) Fabian Holland	24	SV Darmstadt 98	Transfer	Summer	€300,000	
GK	(Germany) Sascha Burchert	25	Vålerenga Fotball	Loan	Summer		
MF	(Germany) Peter Niemeyer	31	SV Darmstadt 98	Transfer	Summer	Undisclosed	
FW	(Germany) Sandro Wagner	27	SV Darmstadt 98	Transfer	Summer	Undisclosed	
DF	(Germany) Nico Schulz	22	Borussia Mönchengladbach	Transfer	Summer	Undisclosed	
MF	(Japan) Hajime Hosogai	29	Bursaspor	Loan	Summer		
GK	(Germany) Marius Gersbeck	20	Chemnitzer FC	Loan	Winter		
DF	(Germany) Yanni Regäsel	20	Eintracht Frankfurt	Transfer	Winter	Undisclosed	
MF	(Germany) Änis Ben-Hatira	27	Eintracht Frankfurt	Transfer	Winter	Undisclosed	

== Friendlies ==
Win Draw Loss Postponed

Date	Kickoff^{1}	Venue	City	Opponent	Res.^{2}	Att.	Goalscorers		Ref.
Date	Kickoff^{1}	Venue	City	Opponent	Res.^{2}	Att.	Hertha BSC	Opponent	Ref.
1 July 2015	18:30	A	Berlin	1. FC Lübars	7–2	1,248	Hegeler 29', 41'; Langkamp 48'; Blumberg 68'; Mittelstädt 73', 82'; Lustenberger 84'	Fell 2'; Morlang 30'	
3 July 2015	17:30	A	Ludwigsfelde	DB-Nationalmannschaft	10–2	745	Mittelstädt 13', 77'; Hegeler 14', 32'; Allagui 17', 45', 85', 86'; Lustenberger 37'; Kauter 62'	56'; 72'	
8 July 2015	18:30	A	Fürstenwalde	FSV Union Fürstenwalde	2–0	1,637	Pekarík 13', 77'		
11 July 2015	18:00	A	Neustrelitz	TSG Neustrelitz	2–2	1,079	Allagui 39'; Niemeyer 60'	Albrecht 58'; Brinkmann 75'	
15 July 2015	19:00	A	Neuruppin	Rayo Vallecano	0–1			Clavería 84'	
21 July 2015	18:00	A	Grödig	SV Grödig	2–2		Ronny 54'; Kalou 68'	Gschweidl 6'; Wallner 64'	
22 July 2015	18:30	A	Schladming	Fulham F.C.	2–2		Darida 5'; Hegeler 14' (pen.)	Taggart 30'; Woodrow 71'	
25 July 2015	18:00	A	Schladming	Akhisar Belediyespor	1–0		Schulz 56'		
1 August 2015	17:30	A	Berlin	Genoa C.F.C.	0–2	5,823		Laxalt 6'; Lazović 79'	
11 January 2016	17:30	A	Belek	Hannover 96	1–0		Ibišević 56'		
12 January 2016	18:30	A	Belek	Borussia Mönchengladbach	2–2		Plattenhardt 60'; Haraguchi 69'	Johnson 34'; Raffael 47'	
13 January 2016	20:00	A	Belek	VfL Bochum	1–4		Baumjohann 7'	Mlapa 49', 75'; Sağlam 57'; Novikovas 61'	
16 January 2016	16:00	A	Belek	FC Vaduz	1–0		Ibišević 36'		
24 March 2016		A	Berlin	Hertha BSC II	1–3		Beerens	Henning; Owusu; Ronny	

== Bundesliga ==
=== League table ===
Pos	Team	Pld	W	D	L	GF	GA	GD	Pts	Qualification or relegation
5	Schalke 04	34	15	7	12	51	49	+2	52	Qualification for the Europa League group stage (Note: Since the winners of the 2015–16 DFB-Pokal, Bayern Munich, qualified for the Champions League based on league position, the Europa League group stage spot was passed to the sixth-placed team, Mainz 05; and the Europa League third qualifying round spot was passed to the seventh-placed team, Hertha BSC.)
6	Mainz 05	34	14	8	12	46	42	+4	50	Qualification for the Europa League group stage
7	Hertha BSC	34	14	8	12	42	42	0	50	Qualification for the Europa League third qualifying round
8	VfL Wolfsburg	34	12	9	13	47	49	−2	45	
9	1. FC Köln	34	10	13	11	38	42	−4	43	

Source: DFB
Rules for classification: 1) Points; 2) Goal difference; 3) Goals scored; 4) Head-to-head points; 5) Head-to-head goal difference; 6) Head-to-head away goals scored; 7) Away goals scored; 8) Play-offs.

=== Results summary ===
Overall								Home						Away					
Pld	W	D	L	GF	GA	GD	Pts	W	D	L	GF	GA	GD	W	D	L	GF	GA	GD
34	14	8	12	42	42	0	50	9	5	3	24	15	+9	5	3	9	18	27	−9

Last updated: 14 May 2016.
Source: Bundesliga

=== Bundesliga fixtures & results ===
Win Draw Loss

MD	Date Kickoff^{1}	H/A	Opponent	Res. F–A	Att.	Goalscorers		Table		Ref.
MD	Date Kickoff^{1}	H/A	Opponent	Res. F–A	Att.	Hertha BSC	Opponent	Pos.	Pts.	Ref.
1	15 August 2015; 15:30	A	FC Augsburg	1–0	30,000	Kalou 48' (pen.)		7th	3	
2	21 August 2015; 20:30	H	Werder Bremen	1–1	56,376	Stocker 6'	Ujah 26'	7th	4	
3	30 August 2015; 15:30	A	Borussia Dortmund	1–3	80,500	Kalou 78'	Hummels 27'; Aubameyang 51'; Ramos 90+3'	10th	4	
4	12 September 2015; 15:30	H	VfB Stuttgart	2–1	45,994	Haraguchi 14'; Lustenberger 45+3'	Šunjić 36'	7th	7	
5	19 September 2015; 15:30	A	VfL Wolfsburg	0–2	30,000		Dost 76', 89' (pen.)	11th	7	
6	22 September 2015; 20:00	H	1. FC Köln	2–0	40,181	Ibišević 43', 90+4'		5th	10	
7	27 September 2015; 15:30	A	Eintracht Frankfurt	1–1	46,000	Darida 82'	Meier 22'	6th	11	
8	3 October 2015; 15:30	H	Hamburger SV	3–0	65,427	Kalou 17'; Ibišević 77', 79'		4th	14	
9	17 October 2015; 15:30	A	Schalke 04	1–2	61,336	Kalou 73'	Höwedes 27'; Meyer 90+2'	5th	14	
10	24 October 2015; 18:30	A	FC Ingolstadt 04	1–0	15,000	Weiser 11'		5th	17	
11	31 October 2015; 15:30	H	Borussia Mönchengladbach	1–4	58,566	Baumjohann 82' (pen.)	Wendt 26'; Raffael 28'; Xhaka 55'; Nordtveit 90+1'	6th	17	
12	6 November 2015; 20:30	A	Hannover 96	3–1	40,200	Kalou 33', 60', 87' (pen.)	Kiyotake 70' (pen.)	4th	20	
13	22 November 2015; 15:30	H	TSG 1899 Hoffenheim	1–0	37,045	Polanski 30' (o.g.)		4th	23	
14	28 November 2015; 15:30	A	Bayern Munich	0–2	75,000		Müller 34'; Coman 41'	5th	23	
15	5 December 2015; 15:30	H	Bayer Leverkusen	2–1	41,819	Darida 7'; Brooks 60'	Hernández 29'	4th	26	
16	12 December 2015; 15:30	A	SV Darmstadt 98	4–0	17,000	Ibišević 12', 50'; Plattenhardt 26'; Kalou 77'		3rd	29	
17	20 December 2015; 15:30	H	1. FSV Mainz 05	2–0	39,835	Darida 34'; Kalou 54'		3rd	32	
18	23 January 2016; 15:30	H	FC Augsburg	0–0	35,196			3rd	33	
19	30 January 2016; 15:30	A	Werder Bremen	3–3	40,141	Darida 29'; Plattenhardt 42'; Kalou 71'	Bartels 67'; Pizarro 75', 77'	3rd	34	
20	6 February 2016; 15:30	H	Borussia Dortmund	0–0	74,244			3rd	35	
21	13 February 2016; 15:30	A	VfB Stuttgart	0–2	45,465		Die 51'; Kostić 84'	4th	35	
22	20 February 2016; 15:30	H	VfL Wolfsburg	1–1	40,126	Kalou 60'	Schäfer 53'	3rd	36	
23	26 February 2016; 20:30	A	1. FC Köln	1–0	48,900	Ibišević 43'		3rd	39	
24	2 March 2016; 20:00	H	Eintracht Frankfurt	2–0	36,608	Weiser 63'; Kalou 78'		3rd	42	
25	6 March 2016; 17:30	A	Hamburger SV	0–2	46,136		Müller 58', 75'	3rd	42	
26	11 March 2016; 20:30	H	FC Schalke 04	2–0	52,000	Ibišević 42'; Stark 65'		3rd	45	
27	19 March 2016; 15:30	H	FC Ingolstadt	2–1	40,385	Haraguchi 54'; Kalou 69'	Hinterseer 75'	3rd	48	
28	3 April 2016; 15:30	A	Borussia Mönchengladbach	0–5	53,114		Hazard 14', 80'; Hahn 60'; Herrmann 76'; Traoré 85'	3rd	48	
29	8 April 2016; 20:30	H	Hannover 96	2–2	45,229	Ibišević 3'; Kalou 72'	Sobiech 18'; Schmiedebach 58'	3rd	49	
30	16 April 2016; 15:30	A	TSG 1899 Hoffenheim	1–2	27,745	Stark 27'	Schär 33'; Uth 85'	4th	49	
31	23 April 2016; 15:30	H	FC Bayern München	0–2	76,233		Vidal 48'; Douglas Costa 79'	4th	49	
32	30 April 2016; 18:30	A	Bayer Leverkusen	1–2	30,210	Ibišević 21'	Brandt 2'; Bender 16'	5th	49	
33	7 May 2016; 15:30	H	SV Darmstadt 98	1–2	60,280	Darida 14'	Gondorf 24'; Wagner 83'	6th	49	
34	14 May 2016; 15:30	A	1. FSV Mainz 05	0–0	33,800			7th	50	

== DFB-Pokal ==
Win Draw Loss Postponed

RD	Date	Kickoff^{1}	Venue	City	Opponent	Result^{2}	Attendance	Goalscorers		Ref.
RD	Date	Kickoff^{1}	Venue	City	Opponent	Result^{2}	Attendance	Hertha BSC	Opponent	Ref.
Round 1	10 August 2015	18:30	A	Bielefeld	Arminia Bielefeld	2–0	21,484	Kalou 73'; Darida 88'		
Round 2	27 October 2015	19:00	A	Frankfurt	FSV Frankfurt	2–1 (aet)	8,177	Kalou 56', 99' (pen.)	Golley 47'	
Round of 16	16 December 2015	19:00	A	Nuremberg	1. FC Nürnberg	2–0	35,204	Darida 32'; Brooks 65'		
Quarter-finals	10 February 2016	19:00	A	Heidenheim	1. FC Heidenheim	3–2	11,900	Ibišević 14', 21'; Haraguchi 58'	Feick 10'; Schnatterer 82' (pen.)	
Semi-finals	20 April 2016	20:30	H	Berlin	Borussia Dortmund	0–3	76,233		Castro 21'; Reus 75'; Mkhitaryan 83'	

== Player information ==
As of 15 May 2016

No.	Pos	Nat	Player	Total		Bundesliga		DFB–Pokal	
No.	Pos	Nat	Player	Apps	Goals	Apps	Goals	Apps	Goals
1	GK	(Germany) GER	Thomas Kraft	7	0	6	0	1	0
2	DF	(Slovakia) SVK	Peter Pekarík	13	0	12	0	1	0
3	MF	(Norway) NOR	Per Ciljan Skjelbred	36	0	31	0	5	0
5	MF	(Germany) GER	Niklas Stark	23	2	21	2	2	0
6	MF	(Czech Republic) CZE	Vladimír Darida	35	7	31	5	4	2
8	FW	(Ivory Coast) CIV	Salomon Kalou	37	17	32	14	5	3
9	MF	(Germany) GER	Alexander Baumjohann	27	1	24	1	3	0
11	FW	(Tunisia) TUN	Sami Allagui	0	0	0	0	0	0
12	MF	(Brazil) BRA	Ronny	1	0	1	0	0	0
13	DF	(Germany) GER	Jens Hegeler	21	0	16	0	5	0
14	MF	(Switzerland) SUI	Valentin Stocker	24	1	22	1	2	0
15	DF	(Germany) GER	Sebastian Langkamp	26	0	22	0	4	0
16	FW	(Germany) GER	Julian Schieber	6	0	5	0	1	0
17	MF	(Germany) GER	Tolga Ciğerci	19	0	18	0	1	0
18	MF	(Germany) GER	Sinan Kurt	0	0	0	0	0	0
19	FW	(Bosnia and Herzegovina) BIH	Vedad Ibišević	30	12	26	10	4	2
20	MF	(Germany) GER	Mitchell Weiser	33	2	29	2	4	0
21	DF	(Germany) GER	Marvin Plattenhardt	37	2	33	2	4	0
22	GK	(Norway) NOR	Rune Jarstein	33	0	29	0	4	0
23	DF	(Germany) GER	Johannes van den Bergh	16	0	13	0	3	0
24	MF	(Japan) JPN	Genki Haraguchi	37	3	32	2	5	1
25	DF	(United States) USA	John Brooks	27	2	23	1	4	1
27	MF	(Netherlands) NED	Roy Beerens	3	0	2	0	1	0
28	DF	(Switzerland) SUI	Fabian Lustenberger	34	1	30	1	4	0
29	GK	(Germany) GER	Nils Körber	0	0	0	0	0	0
31	MF	(Germany) GER	Florian Kohls	1	0	1	0	0	0
34	DF	(Germany) GER	Maximilian Mittelstädt	3	0	3	0	0	0
Players who left the club during the 2015–16 season
7	MF	(Japan) JPN	Hajime Hosogai (on loan to Bursaspor)	0	0	0	0	0	0
10	MF	(Tunisia) TUN	Änis Ben-Hatira	0	0	0	0	0	0
18	MF	(Germany) GER	Peter Niemeyer	0	0	0	0	0	0
26	DF	(Germany) GER	Nico Schulz	2	0	1	0	1	0
30	GK	(Germany) GER	Sascha Burchert (on loan to Vålerenga Fotball)	0	0	0	0	0	0
33	FW	(Germany) GER	Sandro Wagner	0	0	0	0	0	0
35	GK	(Germany) GER	Marius Gersbeck (on loan to Chemnitzer FC)	0	0	0	0	0	0
39	DF	(Germany) GER	Yanni Regäsel	6	0	6	0	0	0

== Notes ==
- 1.Kickoff time in Central European Time/Central European Summer Time.
- 2.Hertha BSC's goals first.
