= 2015–16 Premier League International Cup =

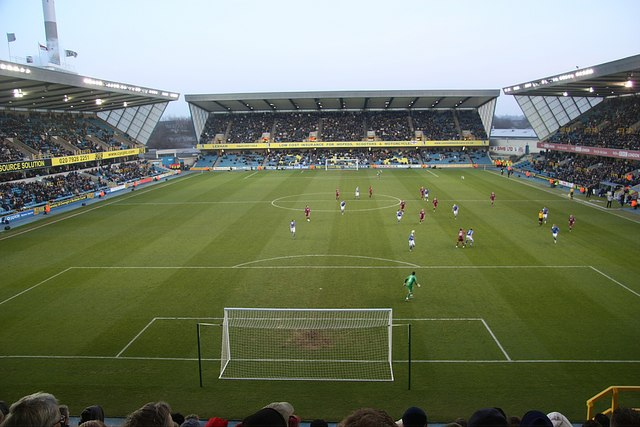
- The Den in South Bermondsey, London hosted the final

Tournament details
- Dates: 19 August 2015 – 4 May 2016
- Teams: 16 (from 6 associations)

Final positions
- Champions: (Spain) Villarreal (1st title)
- Runners-up: (Netherlands) PSV Eindhoven (1st Runner Up)

Tournament statistics
- Matches played: 31
- Goals scored: 98 (3.16 per match)
- Top scorer(s): (Jamaica) Kasey Palmer Chelsea (6 goals)

The 2015–16 Premier League International Cup was the second season of the Premier League International Cup, a European club football competition organised by the Premier League for under-21 players.

Manchester City were the defending champions, after beating Porto 1–0 in the previous season's final, but were eliminated in the group stage.

== Qualification ==
For English sides, qualification was achieved via performance in the 2014–15 Barclays Under 21 Premier League, with the top eight sides securing a place in the competition. Manchester United U21s (champions) and Southampton U21s (8th place) did not take up the opportunity to enter the competition and were replaced by Tottenham Hotspur U21s and Everton U21s, who finished 9th and 10th respectively. The participation of European sides was achieved through invitation and was influenced by the quality of each club's academy. All eight teams from the previous season returned to the competition.

== Group stage ==
Group stage matches were played between 19 August 2015 and 23 December 2015. The teams were drawn into four groups, each containing two English sides and two European sides.

Color key in group tables
Group winners and runners-up advance to the quarterfinals

=== Group A ===
Team	Pld	W	D	L	GF	GA	GD	Pts
(Portugal) Benfica	3	3	0	0	7	1	+6	9
(England) Chelsea	3	2	0	1	9	5	+4	6
(England) Liverpool	3	1	0	2	4	6	−2	3
(Scotland) Celtic	3	0	0	3	1	9	−8	0

11 September 2015	Chelsea (England)	4–2	(England) Liverpool	Aldershot
19:05 BST	Swift 6'; Palmer 51', 63', 65'	Report	Sinclair 18', 36'	Stadium: Recreation Ground; Attendance: 994

24 September 2015	Celtic (Scotland)	1–2	(Portugal) Benfica	High Wycombe
19:00 BST	McIlduff 90'		Gonçalves 37'; Sarkic 54'	Stadium: Adams Park; Attendance: 355; Referee: Carl Brook

16 October 2015	Chelsea (England)	0–3	(Portugal) Benfica	Aldershot
19:05 BST		Report	Gonçalves 45'; Carvalho 62'; Dias 64'	Stadium: Recreation Ground; Referee: Colin Lymer

20 November 2015	Liverpool (England)	0–2	(Portugal) Benfica	Chester
19:00 GMT			Gonçalves 39'; Carvalho 48'	Stadium: Deva Stadium

4 December 2015	Chelsea (England)	5–0	(Scotland) Celtic	Aldershot
19:05 GMT	Ali 4'; Wright 5'; Musonda 15'; Palmer 23'; Mitchell 90+1' (pen.)	Report		Stadium: Recreation Ground; Referee: Paul Kelly

12 December 2015	Liverpool (England)	2–0	(Scotland) Celtic	Chester
14:00 GMT	Lennon 86'; Brannagan 88' (pen.)			Stadium: Deva Stadium

=== Group B ===
Team	Pld	W	D	L	GF	GA	GD	Pts
(England) Tottenham Hotspur	3	2	0	1	8	5	+3	6
(Portugal) Porto	3	2	0	1	4	6	−2	6
(England) Everton	3	1	0	2	6	5	+1	3
(Germany) Schalke 04	3	1	0	2	2	4	−2	3

31 August 2015	Everton (England)	4–1	(England) Tottenham Hotspur	Walton
14:00 BST	Henen 15' (pen.), 47'; Byrne 45+2', 50'		Maghoma 52'	Stadium: Goodison Park; Referee: Simon Barrow

25 September 2015	Porto (Portugal)	1–0	(Germany) Schalke 04	High Wycombe
19:00 BST	Díaz 61'			Stadium: Adams Park

20 October 2015	Everton (England)	0–1	(Germany) Schalke 04	Walton
19:00 BST			Pick 10'	Stadium: Goodison Park

3 November 2015	Tottenham Hotspur (England)	3–1	(Germany) Schalke 04	Stevenage
19:00 GMT	Amos 25'; Harrison 55' (pen.), 70'		Pick 65'	Stadium: Broadhall Way; Attendance: 217; Referee: Josh Smith

22 November 2015	Everton (England)	2–3	(Portugal) Porto	Walton
12:00 GMT	Connolly 75'; Charsley 86'	Report	Silva 6'; Cláudio 12'; Díaz 81'	Stadium: Goodison Park

23 December 2015	Tottenham Hotspur (England)	4–0	(Portugal) Porto	High Wycombe
12:00 GMT	Coulthirst 31', 35'; Walkes 76'; Sonupe 89'	Report		Stadium: Adams Park; Referee: Josh Smith

=== Group C ===
Team	Pld	W	D	L	GF	GA	GD	Pts
(Spain) Villarreal	3	2	0	1	7	3	+4	6
(Netherlands) PSV Eindhoven	3	2	0	1	5	4	+1	6
(England) Leicester City	3	1	0	2	4	6	−2	3
(England) Norwich City	3	1	0	2	2	5	−3	3

2 September 2015	Norwich City (England)	0–3	(Netherlands) PSV Eindhoven	Norwich
19:00 BST			Pereiro 24'; Cmiljanić 86'; Locadia 88'	Stadium: Carrow Road; Attendance: 2,415; Referee: Mathew Buonassisi

7 October 2015	Norwich City (England)	1–0	(Spain) Villarreal	Norwich
19:00 BST	Ramsay 75'	Report		Stadium: Carrow Road; Attendance: 3,508; Referee: Robert Mackay

20 October 2015	Leicester City (England)	2–1	(England) Norwich City	Leicester
19:00 BST	Dodoo 36', 77'	Report	Ashley-Seal 3'	Stadium: King Power Stadium; Attendance: 2,026; Referee: Robert Massey-Ellis

27 October 2015	PSV Eindhoven (Netherlands)	0–4	(Spain) Villarreal	High Wycombe
19:00 GMT			Sol 31', 58'; Pedraza 57'; Suárez 81'	Stadium: Adams Park; Referee: Tim Wood

16 November 2015	Leicester City (England)	0–2	(Netherlands) PSV Eindhoven	Leicester
19:00 GMT			Pereiro 40', 62'	Stadium: King Power Stadium; Attendance: 3,380; Referee: Michael D'Aguilar

1 December 2015	Leicester City (England)	2–3	(Spain) Villarreal	Leicester
19:00 GMT	Cain 42'; Muskwe 55'	Report	Carlitos 25'; Guerra 38'; Pedraza 51'	Stadium: King Power Stadium; Attendance: 2,847; Referee: Sarah Garratt

=== Group D ===
Team	Pld	W	D	L	GF	GA	GD	Pts
(England) Sunderland	3	2	1	0	4	2	+2	7
(Spain) Athletic Bilbao	3	2	0	1	6	4	+2	6
(Germany) Borussia Mönchengladbach	3	0	2	1	3	5	−2	2
(England) Manchester City	3	0	1	2	2	4	−2	1

19 August 2015	Manchester City (England)	1–1	(Germany) Borussia Mönchengladbach	Manchester
19:00 BST	Plummer 20'		Lieder 9'	Stadium: Academy Stadium; Referee: Gareth Mellor

26 August 2015	Manchester City (England)	0–1	(England) Sunderland	Manchester
19:00 BST			Mandron 80'	Stadium: Academy Stadium; Attendance: 561; Referee: Kevin Mulraine

9 September 2015	Borussia Mönchengladbach (Germany)	1–3	(Spain) Athletic Bilbao	High Wycombe
19:00 BST	Rizzo 55'		Lozano 26'; Unai Bilbao 75'; Guruzeta 87'	Stadium: Adams Park; Attendance: 183

12 October 2015	Sunderland (England)	1–1	(Germany) Borussia Mönchengladbach	Sunderland
19:00 BST	Mandron 54'		Ritter 81'	Stadium: Stadium of Light; Attendance: 836; Referee: G Hart

11 November 2015	Sunderland (England)	2–1	(Spain) Athletic Bilbao	Sunderland
19:00 GMT	Graham 32'; Smith 83' (pen.)		Guruzeta 44'	Stadium: Stadium of Light; Attendance: 888; Referee: Alf Greenwood (North Yorkshire)

2 December 2015	Manchester City (England)	1–2	(Spain) Athletic Bilbao	Manchester
19:00 GMT	Celina 52'		Urcelay 48'; Guruzeta 77'	Stadium: Academy Stadium; Referee: Ricky Wootton

== Knockout stages ==
The knockout stages comprised three rounds played as one-off matches: quarter-finals, semi-finals and the final. In the quarter-finals, group stage winners played against the runners-up from another group.

Quarter-finals
(Portugal) Benfica	0
(Portugal) Porto	1
(Spain) Villarreal	2
(Spain) Athletic Bilbao	1
(England) Tottenham Hotspur	2
(England) Chelsea	5
(England) Sunderland	0
(Netherlands) PSV	1

Semi-finals
(Portugal) Porto	1
(Spain) Villarreal	2
(England) Chelsea	1
(Netherlands) PSV	2

Finals
(Spain) Villarreal	4
(Netherlands) PSV	2

=== Quarter-finals ===
28 January 2016	Tottenham Hotspur (England)	2–5	(England) Chelsea	Stevenage
19:05 GMT	Walkes 54'; Miller 72'	Report	Mitchell 6'; Palmer 10'; Aina 35'; Abraham 87', 90+4'	Stadium: Broadhall Way; Referee: Josh Smith

3 February 2016	Villarreal (Spain)	2–1	(Spain) Athletic Bilbao	High Wycombe
19:00 GMT	Sol 4'; Pedraza 47'	Report	Guruzeta 50'	Stadium: Adams Park; Referee: Anthony Coggins

3 February 2016	Benfica (Portugal)	0–1	(Portugal) Porto	South Bermondsey
19:00 GMT		Report	Gleison 34'	Stadium: The Den

5 February 2016	Sunderland (England)	0–1	(Netherlands) PSV	Sunderland
19:00 GMT		Report 1, 2	Leemans 55'	Stadium: Stadium of Light; Attendance: 905; Referee: Andrew Miller

=== Semi-finals ===
3 March 2016	Chelsea (England)	1–2	(Netherlands) PSV	Aldershot
19:05 GMT	Palmer 6'	Report	Chalobah 16' (o.g.); Bergwijn 43'	Stadium: Recreation Ground; Referee: Carl Brook

20 April 2016	Porto (Portugal)	1–2	(Spain) Villarreal	South Bermondsey
19:00 BST	Diaz 74'	Report	Cantalapiedra 4'; Gutiérrez 87'	Stadium: The Den; Referee: Elliott Kaye

=== Final ===
4 May 2016	PSV (Netherlands)	2–4 (a.e.t.)	(Spain) Villarreal	South Bermondsey
19:00 BST	Leemans 44' (pen.); Koch 53'	Report	Suárez 26', 96'; Sol 85', 110'	Stadium: The Den; Referee: Neil Hair

== See also ==
- 2015–16 Professional U21 Development League
- 2015–16 UEFA Youth League
