= 2021–22 FC Fastav Zlín season =

FC Fastav Zlín
2021–22 season
- Chairman: Zdeněk Červenka
- Manager: Jan Jelínek
- Stadium: Letná Stadion
- Czech First League: 15th
- Czech Cup: Pre-season
| Home colours | Away colours |

The 2021–22 season is the 30th season in the existence of FC Fastav Zlín and the club's 10th consecutive season in the top flight of Czech football. In addition to the domestic league, FC Fastav Zlín are participating in this season's edition of the Czech Cup.

== Players ==
=== First-team squad ===
As of 19 July 2021.

Note: Flags indicate national team as defined under FIFA eligibility rules; some limited exceptions apply. Players may hold more than one non-FIFA nationality.

| No. | Pos. | Nation | Player |
|---|---|---|---|
| 1 | GK | SVK | Matej Rakovan |
| 2 | DF | CZE | Dominik Simerský |
| 6 | MF | GUI | Cheick Conde |
| 7 | MF | CZE | Martin Fillo |
| 8 | MF | CZE | Robert Hrubý |
| 9 | MF | CZE | Rudolf Reiter (on loan from Baník Ostrava) |
| 10 | FW | GAM | Lamin Jawo |
| 11 | MF | FRA | Youba Dramé |
| 12 | MF | CZE | David Tkáč |
| 14 | DF | CZE | Martin Cedidla |
| 15 | MF | CZE | Antonín Fantiš |
| 16 | DF | SVK | Róbert Matejov |

| No. | Pos. | Nation | Player |
|---|---|---|---|
| 17 | GK | CZE | Stanislav Dostál |
| 18 | MF | GEO | Vakhtang Chanturishvili |
| 19 | DF | CZE | Lukáš Vraštil |
| 21 | MF | ESP | Pedrito |
| 23 | MF | CZE | Jan Hellebrand |
| 25 | DF | CZE | Martin Nečas |
| 26 | DF | CZE | Václav Procházka |
| 28 | DF | CZE | Jakub Kolář |
| 33 | MF | SVK | Marek Hlinka |
| 44 | GK | CZE | Jan Šiška |
| 68 | MF | CZE | Jakub Janetzký |
| 88 | FW | CZE | Tomáš Poznar |

== Pre-season and friendlies ==
Win Draw Loss Fixtures

== Competitions ==
=== Overall record ===
| Competition | First match | Last match | Starting round | Record | | | | | | | |
| Competition | First match | Last match | Starting round | Pld | W | D | L | GF | GA | GD | Win % |
|---|---|---|---|---|---|---|---|---|---|---|---|
| Czech First League | 25 July 2021 | May 2022 | Matchday 1 | 2 | 0 | 0 | 2 | 0 | 6 | −6 | 0.00 |
| Czech Cup | TBD | | | 0 | 0 | 0 | 0 | 0 | 0 | +0 | — |
| Total | | | | 2 | 0 | 0 | 2 | 0 | 6 | −6 | 0.00 |

Last updated: 31 July 2021
Source: Soccerway

=== Czech First League ===
==== Regular season ====
===== League table =====
| Pos | Team | Pld | W | D | L | GF | GA | GD | Pts | Qualification or relegation |
|---|---|---|---|---|---|---|---|---|---|---|
| 9 | Sigma Olomouc | 30 | 9 | 10 | 11 | 39 | 37 | +2 | 37 | Qualification for the play-off |
| 10 | České Budějovice | 30 | 9 | 9 | 12 | 40 | 46 | −6 | 36 | Qualification for the play-off |
| 11 | Fastav Zlín | 30 | 8 | 6 | 16 | 36 | 53 | −17 | 30 | Qualification for the relegation group |
| 12 | Teplice | 30 | 8 | 3 | 19 | 29 | 49 | −20 | 27 | Qualification for the relegation group |
| 13 | Jablonec | 30 | 4 | 14 | 12 | 22 | 45 | −23 | 26 | Qualification for the relegation group |

Source: Fortuna Liga
Rules for classification: 1) Points; 2) Head-to-head points; 3) Head-to-head goal difference; 4) Head-to-head goals scored; 5) Goal difference; 6) Goals scored; 7) Fair-play ranking; 8) Draw.

==== Relegation group ====
===== League table =====
| Pos | Team | Pld | W | D | L | GF | GA | GD | Pts | Qualification or relegation | PCE | ZLN | JAB | BOH | TEP | KAR |
|---|---|---|---|---|---|---|---|---|---|---|---|---|---|---|---|---|
| 11 | Pardubice | 35 | 9 | 10 | 16 | 42 | 68 | −26 | 37 | | — | 1–1 | — | — | — | 2–0 |
| 12 | Fastav Zlín | 35 | 9 | 9 | 17 | 43 | 60 | −17 | 36 | | — | — | 1–1 | 1–4 | 3–0 | — |
| 13 | Jablonec | 35 | 6 | 16 | 13 | 27 | 48 | −21 | 34 | | 0–1 | — | — | 1–1 | — | 2–0 |
| 14 | Bohemians 1905 (O) | 35 | 8 | 10 | 17 | 45 | 61 | −16 | 34 | Qualification for the relegation play-offs | 0–1 | — | — | — | — | 4–0 |
| 15 | Teplice (O) | 35 | 8 | 5 | 22 | 33 | 59 | −26 | 29 | Qualification for the relegation play-offs | 0–2 | — | 0–1 | 2–2 | — | — |
| 16 | Karviná (R) | 35 | 3 | 10 | 22 | 33 | 63 | −30 | 19 | Relegation to the FNL | — | 1–1 | — | — | 2–2 | — |

Source: Fortuna Liga
Legend: Blue = home team win; Yellow = draw; Red = away team win.
Rules for classification: 1) Total points; 2) Points earned in regular season; 3) Head-to-head points (regular season); 4) Head-to-head goal difference (regular season); 5) Head-to-head goals scored (regular season); 5) Goal difference (all matches); 6) Goals scored (all matches); 7) Fair-play ranking; 8) Draw.
(O) Play-off winners; (R) Relegated
