= Antonio Leal =

Antonio Leal may refer to:

- Antonio Leal (fencer), Venezuelan fencer
- Antonio Leal (footballer), Spanish footballer
- Antonio Leal Labrín, Chilean politician
