= 2016–17 Premier League International Cup =

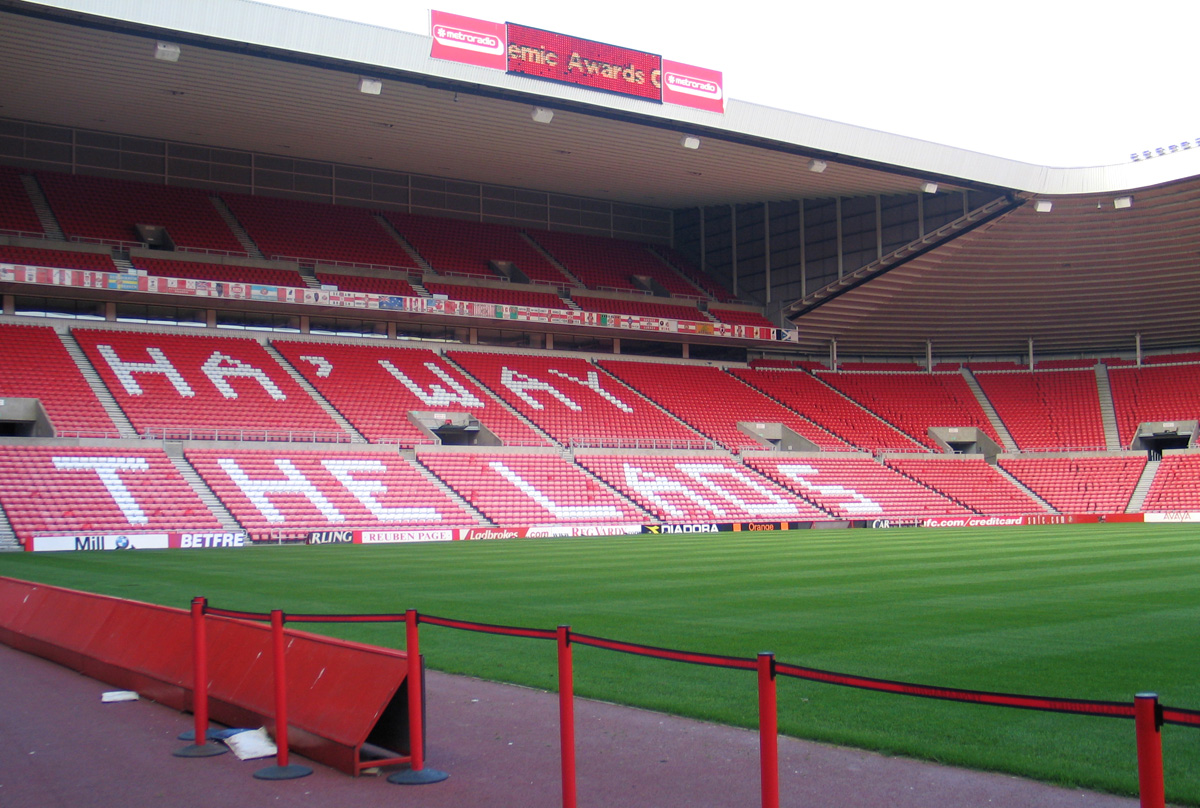
- The Stadium of Light in Monkwearmouth, Sunderland hosted the final

Tournament details
- Dates: 18 August 2016 – 17 May 2017
- Teams: 24 (from 8 associations)

Final positions
- Champions: (Portugal) Porto (1st title)
- Runners-up: (England) Sunderland (1st Runner Up)

Tournament statistics
- Matches played: 43
- Goals scored: 119 (2.77 per match)
- Top scorer(s): (England) Carlton Morris Norwich City (4 goals)

The 2016–17 Premier League International Cup was the third season of the Premier League International Cup, a European club football competition organised by the Premier League for under-23 players.

Villarreal were the defending champions, having defeated PSV 4–2 in the previous season's final, but were eliminated in the group stage.

== Qualification ==
Twelve teams in Premier League 2 were invited to represent England in the tournament, while European teams that qualify for the knockout stages were guaranteed an invite for the following season's competition. The teams were split into six groups of four - with two English league clubs per group. The group winners, and two best runners-up, progressed into the knockout phase of the tournament. The knockout matches were single leg fixtures.

All matches - including fixtures between non-English teams - were played in England and Wales.

=== Teams ===
Valencia, Feyenoord, Sparta Prague, Dinamo Zagreb, VfL Wolfsburg, and Hertha Berlin were the new international entrants in the 2016–17 season.

English league system:

- (England) Middlesbrough
- (England) Derby County
- (England) Everton
- (England) Leicester City
- (England) Liverpool
- (England) Manchester United
- (England) Chelsea
- (England) Reading
- (England) Sunderland
- (England) Norwich City
- (England) Aston Villa
- (Wales) Swansea City

Other countries:

- (Spain) Valencia
- (Spain) Athletic Bilbao
- (Spain) Villarreal
- (Germany) VfL Wolfsburg
- (Germany) Hertha Berlin
- (Portugal) Porto
- (Portugal) Benfica
- (Netherlands) PSV Eindhoven
- (Netherlands) Feyenoord
- (Scotland) Celtic
- (Croatia) Dinamo Zagreb
- (Czech Republic) Sparta Prague

== Group stage ==
The draw for the group stage was held on 28 July 2016. The teams were drawn into four groups, each containing two English sides and two European sides.

Color key in group tables
Group winners and the two best runners-up advance to the quarterfinals

=== Group A ===
Team	Pld	W	D	L	GF	GA	GD	Pts
(England) Sunderland	3	2	1	0	6	3	+3	7
(Portugal) Benfica	3	1	1	1	3	2	+1	4
(England) Derby County	3	1	1	1	4	5	−1	4
(Netherlands) PSV Eindhoven	3	0	1	2	1	4	−3	1

22 September 2016	Derby County (England)	2–1	(Netherlands) PSV Eindhoven	Burton upon Trent
19:00 BST (UTC+1)	Blackman (pen.), 14'; Rawson 19'	Report	Gudmundsson (pen.), 63'	Stadium: St George's Park

14 October 2016	Derby County (England)	0–2	(Portugal) Benfica	Burton upon Trent
19:00 BST (UTC+1)		Report	Carvalho 16'; Tavares 72'	Stadium: St George's Park

18 November 2016	Sunderland (England)	2–1	(Portugal) Benfica	Hetton-le-Hole
19:00 BST (UTC+1)	Asoro 19'; Molyneux		Tavares	Stadium: Eppleton Colliery Welfare Ground; Attendance: 344; Referee: Mr S.Rushton

23 December 2016	Sunderland (England)	2–0	(Netherlands) PSV Eindhoven	Sunderland
19:00 GMT (UTC)	Embleton 69'; Asoro 86'			Stadium: Stadium of Light

12 January 2017	Derby County (England)	2–2	(England) Sunderland	Derby
19:00 GMT (UTC)	MacDonald 41'; Robson 45' (o.g.)	Report	Nelson 66'; Cresswell 90' (o.g.)	Stadium: iPro Stadium; Attendance: 207

18 January 2017	Benfica (Portugal)	0–0	(Netherlands) PSV Eindhoven	New Malden
19:00 GMT (UTC)				Stadium: Motspur Park

=== Group B ===
Team	Pld	W	D	L	GF	GA	GD	Pts
(England) Manchester United	3	2	1	0	5	2	+3	7
(England) Middlesbrough	3	2	1	0	4	2	+2	7
(Spain) Villarreal	3	1	0	2	2	3	−1	3
(Czech Republic) Sparta Prague	3	0	0	3	1	5	−4	0

13 September 2016	Manchester United (England)	1–0	(Spain) Villarreal	Leigh
19:00 GMT (UTC)	Harrop 34'			Stadium: Leigh Sports Village; Referee: Joseph Johnson

11 October 2016	Middlesbrough (England)	1–0	(Spain) Villarreal	Darlington
19:00 BST (UTC+1)	Cooke 90'			Stadium: The Darlington Arena; Attendance: 467; Referee: Andrew Miller

15 November 2016	Middlesbrough (England)	1–0	(Czech Republic) Sparta Prague	Hartlepool
19:00 GMT (UTC)	Cooke 33'			Stadium: Victoria Park; Attendance: 200; Referee: Tony Harrington

13 December 2016	Villarreal (Spain)	2–1	(Czech Republic) Sparta Prague	Burton upon Trent
19:00 GMT (UTC)	Acosta 10'; Cantalapiedra 87'		Burda 45'	Stadium: St George's Park; Referee: Thomas Bramall

15 December 2016	Manchester United (England)	2–0	(Czech Republic) Sparta Prague	Leigh
19:00 GMT (UTC)	Harrop 21'; Redmond 55'	Report		Stadium: Leigh Sports Village; Attendance: 943; Referee: Martin Coy

22 December 2016	Manchester United (England)	2–2	(England) Middlesbrough	Leigh
19:00 GMT (UTC)	Mitchell 59'; Goss 72' (pen.)	Report	de Pena 63', 83'	Stadium: Leigh Sports Village; Attendance: 856; Referee: Peter Wright

=== Group C ===
Team	Pld	W	D	L	GF	GA	GD	Pts
(Portugal) Porto	3	2	1	0	6	1	+5	7
(Germany) VfL Wolfsburg	3	2	0	1	5	4	+1	6
(England) Leicester City	3	1	0	2	2	6	−4	3
(England) Liverpool	3	0	1	2	3	5	−2	1

28 September 2016	Liverpool (England)	1–2	(Germany) VfL Wolfsburg	Birkenhead
19:00 BST (UTC+1)	Lennon 80'		Brekalo 51'; Hansen 90'	Stadium: Prenton Park; Referee: Anthony Backhouse

11 October 2016	Leicester City (England)	0–3	(Germany) VfL Wolfsburg	Leicester
19:00 BST (UTC+1)			Zawada 42'; Donkor 58' 63'	Stadium: King Power Stadium; Attendance: 200; Referee: Thomas Bramall

2 November 2016	Liverpool (England)	1–1	(Portugal) Porto	Birkenhead
19:00 GMT (UTC)	Lennon 65'	Report	Govea 49'	Stadium: Prenton Park; Referee: Anthony Backhouse

12 November 2016	Leicester City (England)	0–2	(Portugal) Porto	Leicester
19:00 GMT (UTC)		Report	Inácio 55'; Palmer-Brown 81'	Stadium: King Power Stadium

3 December 2016	Leicester City (England)	2–1	(England) Liverpool	Whetstone
19:00 GMT (UTC)	Ndukwu 50', 77'		Wilson 45'	Stadium: Holmes Park; Referee: Anthony Serrano

14 December 2016	Porto (Portugal)	3–0	(Germany) VfL Wolfsburg	Lancing
19:00 GMT (UTC)	Ramos 39'; Areias 44'; Kayembe 58'	Report		Stadium: American Express Elite Performance Centre

=== Group D ===
Team	Pld	W	D	L	GF	GA	GD	Pts
(Croatia) Dinamo Zagreb	3	2	1	0	4	0	+4	7
(Wales) Swansea City	3	2	1	0	4	1	+3	7
(England) Chelsea	3	1	0	2	3	4	−1	3
(Netherlands) Feyenoord	3	0	0	3	1	7	−6	0

11 October 2016	Swansea City (Wales)	2–0	(Netherlands) Feyenoord	Landore
19:00 BST (UTC+1)	Plezier 10'; Biabi 90' pen			Stadium: Landore Training Centre

11 November 2016	Swansea City (Wales)	0–0	(Croatia) Dinamo Zagreb	Landore
19:00 GMT (UTC)				Stadium: Landore Training Centre

29 November 2016	Chelsea (England)	2–1	(Netherlands) Feyenoord	Aldershot
19:00 GMT (UTC)	Sterling 84'; Tomori 85'		Basacikoglu 12'	Stadium: Recreation Ground; Referee: Constantine Hatzidakis

16 December 2016	Chelsea (England)	0–1	(Croatia) Dinamo Zagreb	Aldershot
19:00 GMT (UTC)			Mihaljević 38'	Stadium: Recreation Ground; Attendance: 700; Referee: Adrian Quelch

20 December 2016	Feyenoord (Netherlands)	0–3	(Croatia) Dinamo Zagreb	Stoke d'Abernon
19:00 GMT (UTC)			Mihaljević 25', 36'; Muhar 90+2'	Stadium: Cobham Training Centre; Attendance: 100

22 December 2016	Chelsea (England)	1–2	(Wales) Swansea City	Aldershot
19:00 GMT (UTC)	Quintero 34'		Biabi 53'; James 86'	Stadium: Recreation Ground

=== Group E ===
Team	Pld	W	D	L	GF	GA	GD	Pts
(England) Norwich City	3	3	0	0	9	3	+6	9
(Scotland) Celtic	3	2	0	1	6	3	+3	6
(England) Aston Villa	3	1	0	2	5	8	−3	3
(Spain) Valencia	3	0	0	3	1	7	−6	0

6 September 2016	Norwich City (England)	2–0	(Spain) Valencia	Norwich
19:00 BST (UTC+1)	Morris 15'; Latorre , 28' (o.g.)			Stadium: Carrow Road; Attendance: 829

5 October 2016	Aston Villa (England)	2–1	(Spain) Valencia	Aston
20:00 BST (UTC+1)	O'Hare 41' 82'		Soler Barragan 45'	Stadium: Villa Park; Referee: Robert Whitton

9 November 2016	Aston Villa (England)	0–3	(Scotland) Celtic	Aston
19:00 GMT (UTC)		Report	Donnelly 15', 63'; Aitchison 34'	Stadium: Villa Park; Referee: Anthony Serrano

16 November 2016	Norwich City (England)	3–0	(Scotland) Celtic	Norwich
19:00 GMT (UTC)	Morris 6' (pen.), 81'; Murphy 58'	Report		Stadium: Carrow Road; Attendance: 2,074

30 November 2016	Valencia (Spain)	0–3	(Scotland) Celtic	Marchwood
19:00 GMT (UTC)		Report	Nesbitt 1'; Donnelly 39'; Ajer 56'	Stadium: Staplewood; Referee: Sam Allison

12 January 2017	Norwich City (England)	4–3	(England) Aston Villa	Norwich
19:00 GMT (UTC)	Maddison 43'; Morris 47'; Middleton 56'; Jaiyesimi 76'		Davis 29', 52'; Sellars 44'	Stadium: Carrow Road; Attendance: 200; Referee: Dean Treleaven

=== Group F ===
Team	Pld	W	D	L	GF	GA	GD	Pts
(Germany) Hertha BSC	3	2	1	0	7	3	+4	7
(Spain) Athletic Bilbao	3	2	1	0	7	5	+2	7
(England) Everton	3	1	0	2	4	6	−2	3
(England) Reading	3	0	0	3	3	7	−4	0

18 August 2016	Everton (England)	2–1	(England) Reading	Southport
19:00 BST (UTC+1)	Dyson 7'; Evans 12'	Report	Fosu 36'	Stadium: Haig Avenue; Referee: Andrew Miller

26 October 2016	Athletic Bilbao (Spain)	2–2	(Germany) Hertha BSC	Lancing
19:00 BST (UTC+1)	Iriondo 6'; Morcillo 76'	Report	Kohls 32'; Pelivan 55' (pen.)	Stadium: American Express Elite Football Performance Centre; Referee: Craig Hicks

23 November 2016	Everton (England)	1–3	(Germany) Hertha BSC	Walton
19:00 GMT (UTC)	Jones 50'	Report	Friede 11', 20'; Kurt 32'	Stadium: Goodison Park; Referee: Steven Rushton

23 November 2016	Reading (England)	2–3	(Spain) Athletic Bilbao	High Wycombe
19:00 GMT (UTC)	Méïté 4', 9'	Report	Southwood 45+3' (o.g.); Bilbao 71'; Villalibre 72'	Stadium: Adams Park; Referee: David Rock

14 December 2016	Reading (England)	0–2	(Germany) Hertha BSC	Reading
19:00 GMT (UTC)		Report	Friede 64'; Beyer 74'	Stadium: Madejski Stadium; Referee: Craig Hicks

21 December 2016	Everton (England)	1–2	(Spain) Athletic Bilbao	Walton
19:00 GMT (UTC)	Connolly 9'	Report	Córdoba 43'; Núñez 81'	Stadium: Goodison Park; Referee: Simon Barrow

=== Ranking of second-placed teams ===
Team	Pld	W	D	L	GF	GA	GD	Pts
(Wales) Swansea City	3	2	1	0	4	1	+3	7
(Spain) Athletic Bilbao	3	2	1	0	7	5	+2	7
(England) Middlesbrough	3	2	1	0	4	2	+2	7
(Scotland) Celtic	3	2	0	1	6	3	+3	6
(Germany) VfL Wolfsburg	3	2	0	1	5	4	+1	6
(Portugal) Benfica	3	1	1	1	3	2	+1	4

== Knockout stages ==
Quarter-finals
(Wales) Swansea City	5
(Germany) Hertha BSC	1
(England) Manchester United	0
(Portugal) Porto	2
(England) Norwich City	6
(Croatia) Dinamo Zagreb	0
(England) Sunderland	2
(Spain) Athletic Bilbao	0

Semi-finals
(Wales) Swansea City	0
(Portugal) Porto	1
(England) Norwich City	0
(England) Sunderland	1

Finals
(Portugal) Porto	5
(England) Sunderland	0

=== Quarter-finals ===
15 February 2017	Sunderland (England)	2–0	(Spain) Athletic Bilbao	Sunderland
19:00 GMT (UTC)	Robson 25'; Embleton 47'	Report	Córdoba (red card) 52'	Stadium: Stadium of Light; Attendance: 634; Referee: Tom Bramall (Derbyshire)

22 February 2017	Manchester United (England)	0–2	(Portugal) Porto	Leigh
19:00 GMT (UTC)		Report	Díaz 65', 69'	Stadium: Leigh Sports Village; Attendance: 1,212; Referee: Scott Oldham

27 February 2017	Norwich City (England)	6–0	(Croatia) Dinamo Zagreb	Norwich
	Lafferty 27', 31'; Murphy 43'; Maddison 45' (pen.); Middleton 48'; Cantwell 90' (pen.)	Report		Stadium: Carrow Road; Attendance: 2,526

28 February 2017	Swansea City (Wales)	5–1	(Germany) Hertha BSC	Swansea
19:00 GMT (UTC)	King 8', 59', 73'; McBurnie 50'; James 52'		Kade 49'	Stadium: Liberty Stadium; Attendance: 926; Referee: Anthony Coggins

=== Semi-finals ===
25 March 2017	Swansea City (Wales)	0–1	(Portugal) Porto	Swansea
12:30 GMT (UTC)			Galeno 64'	Stadium: Liberty Stadium; Attendance: 2,118

31 March 2017	Norwich City (England)	0–1	(England) Sunderland	Norwich
19:00 BST (UTC+1)			Asoro 13'	Stadium: Carrow Road; Attendance: 3,000 estimated

=== Final ===
17 May 2017	Sunderland (England)	0–5	(Portugal) Porto	Sunderland
19:00 BST (UTC+1)			Galeno 5', 37'; Pereira 45+2'; Kayembe 51'; Awaziem 55'	Stadium: Stadium of Light; Attendance: 18,317; Referee: Peter Wright
