= Borna Miklić =

Croatian footballer (born 1997)

Personal information
- Full name: Borna Miklić
- Date of birth: 2 November 1997 (age 28)
- Place of birth: Zagreb, Croatia
- Height: 1.90 m (6 ft 3 in)
- Position: Forward

Team information
- Current team: UMass Lowell River Hawks
- Number: 9

Youth career
- HNŠK Moslavina
- 2011–2018: Dinamo Zagreb

Senior career*
Years	Team	Apps	(Gls)
2016–2020	Dinamo Zagreb	1	(0)
2016–2020	→ Dinamo Zagreb II	38	(12)
2018–2019	→ Varaždin (loan)	7	(1)
2019	→ Sesvete (loan)	5	(0)
2020	Lučko		
2021-	UMass Lowell River Hawks	29	(9)
- * Club domestic league appearances and goals as of 27 October 2022

Borna Miklić (born 2 November 1997) is a Croatian professional footballer who plays as a forward for UMass Lowell River Hawks.

== Club career ==
=== Dinamo Zagreb ===
Having started his football career with HNŠK Moslavina, Miklić was signed into the academy Dinamo Zagreb at the age of six after being noticed by scouts of the club. A prolific goalscorer during his time with the academy, he helped the club to a youth championship before being rewarded with a professional contract in 2015. Over the course of the next three years he represented the club's reserve side in both the 2. HNL and Premier League International Cup. In April 2018, following injuries to a number of first team players, he made his debut for the senior side in a 1–0 loss to Rijeka.

==== Loan to NK Varaždin ====
In August 2018, Miklić signed for 2. HNL side Varaždin on a season-long loan.

== Career statistics ==
=== Club ===
As of match played 16 July 2018

Appearances and goals by club, season and competition
Club	Season	League			FA Cup		League Cup		Continental		Total	
Club	Season	Division	Apps	Goals	Apps	Goals	Apps	Goals	Apps	Goals	Apps	Goals
Dinamo Zagreb	2017–18	1. HNL	1	0	0	0	0	0	—		1	0
Dinamo Zagreb	Career total		1	0	0	0	0	0	0	0	1	0
