= Enric Pujol =

Spanish footballer

Personal information
- Full name: Enric Pujol Sevilla
- Date of birth: 19 May 2006 (age 20)
- Place of birth: Gandesa, Spain
- Height: 1.90 m (6 ft 3 in)
- Position: Centre-back

Team information
- Current team: Villarreal B

Youth career
- Gandesa
- 2021–2023: Fundació Reus
- 2023–2025: Gimnàstic

Senior career*
Years	Team	Apps	(Gls)
2025–2026	Gimnàstic	28	(0)
2026–	Villarreal B	0	(0)
- * Club domestic league appearances and goals as of 23 May 2026

Enric Pujol Sevilla (born 19 May 2006) is a Spanish footballer who plays as a centre-back for Villarreal CF B.

== Career ==
Born in Gandesa, Tarragona, Catalonia, Pujol played for hometown side CF Gandesa and Fundació FB Reus before joining the youth categories of Gimnàstic de Tarragona in 2023. On 6 May 2025, while still a youth, he renewed his contract with the latter until 2027, being promoted straight to the first team ahead of the 2025–26 season.

On 24 May 2025, before even having appeared with farm team, CF Pobla de Mafumet, Pujol made his first team debut by coming on as a second-half substitute for Antonio Leal in a 2–0 Primera Federación home win over CD Arenteiro. Seven days later, he was given a starting spot in the first leg of the promotion play-offs semifinals against Real Murcia CF, as the match ended a 1–1 draw also at the Nou Estadi.

Pujol became a first-choice under manager Luis César Sampedro during the remaining matches of the play-offs, overtaking Leal and Gorka Pérez in the pecking order, as the club narrowly missed out promotion for a second consecutive year.

On 20 August 2026, Pujol joined Villarreal CF on a three-year contract, being initially assigned to the reserves also in the third division, for a rumoured fee of € 100,000 plus 30% over a future sale.
