= Marius Gersbeck =

German goalkeeper

Personal information
- Date of birth: 20 June 1995 (age 31)
- Place of birth: Berlin, Germany
- Height: 1.87 m (6 ft 2 in)
- Position: Goalkeeper

Team information
- Current team: Hertha BSC
- Number: 35

Youth career
- –2001: SC Siemensstadt
- 2001–2004: FC Brandenburg 03
- 2004–2012: Hertha BSC

Senior career*
| Years | Team | Apps | (Gls) |
| 2012–2015 | Hertha BSC II | 25 | (0) |
| 2013–2019 | Hertha BSC | 1 | (0) |
| 2016 | → Chemnitzer FC (loan) | 5 | (0) |
| 2016–2018 | → VfL Osnabrück (loan) | 69 | (0) |
| 2019–2023 | Karlsruher SC | 92 | (0) |
| 2023– | Hertha BSC | 22 | (0) |

International career^{‡}
| 2012–2013 | Germany U18 | 4 | (0) |
| 2013–2014 | Germany U19 | 2 | (0) |
| 2015 | Germany U20 | 1 | (0) |
Medal record
| Winner | European U19 Championship | 2014 |
- * Club domestic league appearances and goals as of 18 May 2026 ‡ National team caps and goals as of 11:05, 30 July 2018 (UTC)

Marius Gersbeck (20 June 1995) is a German professional footballer who plays as a goalkeeper for Hertha BSC.

== Career ==
Gersbeck made his professional debut at 18 years old for Hertha BSC on 21 December 2013, in a Bundesliga match against Borussia Dortmund in Westfalenstadion as a starter, helping Hertha to a 1–2 away victory.

In June 2016, he joined VfL Osnabrück on loan for the 2016–17 season.

In June 2019 Gersbeck left Hertha BSC permanently after 15 years to join 2. Bundesliga club Karlsruher SC.

He returned to Hertha in June 2023. However, Hertha suspended him in July 2023 after a reported fight in the street.

== Career statistics ==
As of match played 22 November 2026

| Club | Season | League | | | Cup | | Total | |
| Club | Season | Division | Apps | Goals | Apps | Goals | Apps | Goals |
|---|---|---|---|---|---|---|---|---|
| Hertha BSC II | 2012–13 | Regionalliga Nordost | 6 | 0 | — | | 6 | 0 |
| Hertha BSC II | 2013–14 | Regionalliga Nordost | 7 | 0 | — | | 7 | 0 |
| Hertha BSC II | 2014–15 | Regionalliga Nordost | 3 | 0 | — | | 3 | 0 |
| Hertha BSC II | 2015–16 | Regionalliga Nordost | 7 | 0 | — | | 7 | 0 |
| Hertha BSC II | 2018–19 | Regionalliga Nordost | 2 | 0 | — | | 2 | 0 |
| Hertha BSC II | Total | | 25 | 0 | — | | 25 | 0 |
| Hertha BSC | 2012–13 | 2. Bundesliga | 0 | 0 | — | | 0 | 0 |
| Hertha BSC | 2013–14 | Bundesliga | 1 | 0 | 0 | 0 | 1 | 0 |
| Hertha BSC | 2014–15 | Bundesliga | 0 | 0 | 0 | 0 | 0 | 0 |
| Hertha BSC | 2015–16 | Bundesliga | 0 | 0 | 0 | 0 | 0 | 0 |
| Hertha BSC | Total | | 1 | 0 | 0 | 0 | 1 | 0 |
| Chemnitzer FC (loan) | 2015–16 | 3. Liga | 5 | 0 | — | | 0 | 0 |
| VfL Osnabrück (loan) | 2016–17 | 3. Liga | 37 | 0 | 2 | 0 | 39 | 0 |
| VfL Osnabrück (loan) | 2017–18 | 3. Liga | 32 | 0 | 2 | 0 | 34 | 0 |
| VfL Osnabrück (loan) | Total | | 69 | 0 | 4 | 0 | 73 | 0 |
| Karlsruher SC | 2019–20 | 2. Bundesliga | 0 | 0 | 2 | 0 | 2 | 0 |
| Karlsruher SC | 2020–21 | 2. Bundesliga | 33 | 0 | 1 | 0 | 34 | 0 |
| Karlsruher SC | 2021–22 | 2. Bundesliga | 28 | 0 | 4 | 0 | 32 | 0 |
| Karlsruher SC | 2022–23 | 2. Bundesliga | 31 | 0 | 1 | 0 | 32 | 0 |
| Karlsruher SC | Total | | 92 | 0 | 8 | 0 | 100 | 0 |
| Hertha BSC | 2023–24 | 2. Bundesliga | 4 | 0 | 1 | 0 | 5 | 0 |
| Hertha BSC | 2024–25 | 2. Bundesliga | 5 | 0 | 1 | 0 | 6 | 0 |
| Hertha BSC | 2025–26 | 2. Bundesliga | 1 | 0 | 0 | 0 | 1 | 0 |
| Hertha BSC | 2026-27 | 2. Bundesliga | 12 | 0 | 2 | 0 | 14 | 0 |
| Hertha BSC | Total | | 22 | 0 | 4 | 0 | 26 | 0 |
| Career total | | | 214 | 0 | 16 | 0 | 230 | 0 |
