= Leandro Silva (footballer, born 1994) =

Portuguese footballer

Personal information
- Full name: Leandro Miguel Pereira da Silva
- Date of birth: 4 May 1994 (age 32)
- Place of birth: Castelo de Paiva, Portugal
- Height: 1.73 m (5 ft 8 in)
- Position: Midfielder

Team information
- Current team: Académica
- Number: 5

Youth career
- 2002–2006: Paivense
- 2006–2013: Porto
- 2009–2010: → Padroense (loan)

Senior career*
Years	Team	Apps	(Gls)
2013–2017	Porto B	71	(2)
2015–2016	→ Académica (loan)	27	(1)
2016	→ Paços Ferreira (loan)	7	(0)
2017	→ Académica (loan)	19	(2)
2017–2021	AEL Limassol	50	(6)
2019–2020	→ Académica (loan)	22	(2)
2020–2021	→ Arouca (loan)	31	(1)
2021–2022	Arouca	31	(1)
2022	Hapoel Haifa	3	(0)
2023–2024	União Leiria	39	(2)
2024	Al-Jandal	3	(1)
2024–	Académica	52	(9)

International career
2009–2010	Portugal U16	8	(0)
2010–2011	Portugal U17	15	(1)
2011–2012	Portugal U18	10	(1)
2012–2013	Portugal U19	16	(2)
2014	Portugal U20	3	(1)
2016	Portugal U21	1	(0)
2016	Portugal U23	1	(0)
- * Club domestic league appearances and goals as of 12:00, 12 May 2026 (UTC)

Leandro Miguel Pereira da Silva (born 4 May 1994) is a Portuguese professional footballer who plays as a midfielder for Liga Portugal 2 club Académica de Coimbra.

== Club career ==
Born in Castelo de Paiva, Aveiro District, Silva joined FC Porto's youth system at the age of 12. On 21 August 2013 he made his professional debut with the reserves, coming on as a 67th-minute substitute for Thibaut Vion in a 1–0 away win against Portimonense S.C. in the Segunda Liga. On 22 April 2015, in the semi-finals of the Premier League International Cup, he scored all of his team's goals to help overcome Fulham 3–0.

Silva spent the 2015–16 and 2016–17 seasons on loan in the Primeira Liga, respectively at Académica de Coimbra and F.C. Paços de Ferreira. Due to lack of playing opportunities at the latter he was recalled by his parent club on 26 December 2016, being re-loaned to Académica shortly after.

In the summer of 2017, Silva signed with AEL Limassol in the Cypriot First Division. He served two Portuguese second tier loans until the end of his contract, at Académica and F.C. Arouca; he contributed 31 matches and one goal in his first season at the latter side, helping to a return to the top flight after four years.

Already on a permanent two-year deal at Arouca, Silva registered the exact same figures in the 2021–22 campaign as they managed to stay afloat. In January 2023, following a very brief spell in the Israeli Premier League with Hapoel Haifa FC, he returned to Portugal with U.D. Leiria, achieving promotion to division two with them in May.

Silva went abroad again on 23 July 2024, joining Saudi First Division League club Al-Jandal SC. In September, however, he rejoined Académica for a fourth stint, with the side now in the third tier.

== International career ==
All youth levels comprised, Silva earned 55 caps for Portugal. He made his debut for the under-21 side on 24 March 2016, in a 4–0 home victory over Liechtenstein in the 2017 UEFA European Under-21 Championship qualifiers.
