= 2014–15 Premier League International Cup =

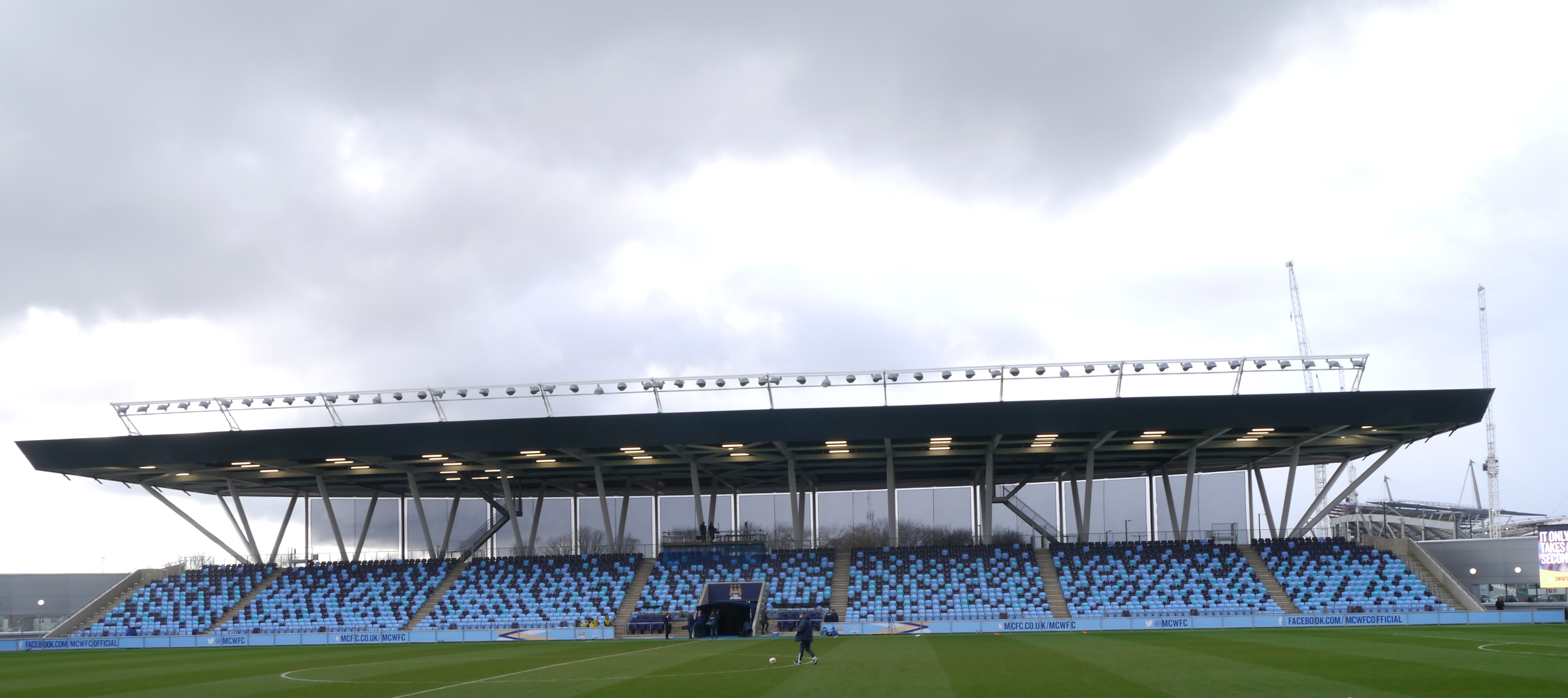
- The Academy Stadium in Sportcity, Manchester hosted the final

Tournament details
- Dates: 15 October 2014 – 8 May 2015
- Teams: 16 (from 6 associations)

Final positions
- Champions: (England) Manchester City (1st title)
- Runners-up: (Portugal) Porto (1st Runner Up)

Tournament statistics
- Matches played: 31
- Goals scored: 96 (3.1 per match)
- Top scorer(s): (Saint Kitts and Nevis) Harry Panayiotou Leicester City (Portugal) Leandro Silva Porto (6 Goals Each)

The 2014–15 Premier League International Cup was the inaugural season of the Premier League International Cup, a European club football competition organised by the Premier League for under-21 players.

== Qualification ==
For English sides qualification was via performance in the 2013–14 Barclays Under 21 Premier League with the top eight sides qualifying for the competition. Liverpool U21s and Manchester United U21s did not take up the opportunity to enter the competition and they were replaced with West Ham U21s and Norwich City U21s who finished 9th and 10th respectively. Entry of European teams was by invitation and was influenced by the quality of each club's academy.

== Group stage ==
Group-stage matches were played between 15 October 2014 and 31 January 2015. The teams were drawn into four groups of four with two English sides and two European sides in each group.

Color key in group tables
Group winners and runners-up advanced to the quarter-finals

=== Group A ===
Team	Pld	W	D	L	GF	GA	GD	Pts
(England) Chelsea	3	2	1	0	8	2	+6	7
(Portugal) Porto	3	1	1	1	5	5	0	4
(England) Norwich City	3	1	0	2	2	7	−5	3
(Germany) Borussia Mönchengladbach	3	0	2	1	3	4	−1	2

19 December 2014	Chelsea (England)	1–1	(Germany) Borussia Mönchengladbach	Staines-upon-Thames
	Brown 89'	Report	Rodriguez 61'	Stadium: Wheatsheaf Park; Attendance: 252; Referee: John Busby

23 December 2014	Chelsea (England)	5–0	(England) Norwich City	Kingston-upon-Thames
	Kiwomya 23'; Gafaiti 47' (o.g.); Boga 66'; Solanke 74', 89'	Report		Stadium: Cherry Red Records Stadium; Referee: Anthony Coggins

14 January 2015	Chelsea (England)	2–1	(Portugal) Porto	Aldershot
	Palmer 20'; Scott 90+1'	Report	Silva 15'	Stadium: The Recreation Ground; Attendance: 397; Referee: Constantine Hatzidakis

27 January 2015	Norwich City (England)	1–0	(Germany) Borussia Mönchengladbach	Norwich
	Morris 63'	Report		Stadium: Carrow Road; Attendance: 3,816; Referee: Neil Hair

11 February 2015	Porto (Portugal)	2–2	(Germany) Borussia Mönchengladbach	Aldershot
	Silva 2' (pen.); Pité 63'; Carlos (red card) 73'	Report	Berg 38' (pen.), 74' (pen.)	Stadium: The Recreation Ground

4 March 2015	Norwich City (England)	1–2	(Portugal) Porto	Norwich
	Becchio 54' (pen.)	Report	Silva 15' (pen.); Costa 57'	Stadium: Colney Training Centre; Referee: Rathbone

=== Group B ===
Team	Pld	W	D	L	GF	GA	GD	Pts
(Spain) Athletic Bilbao	3	2	0	1	7	5	+2	6
(England) Fulham	3	2	0	1	6	5	+1	6
(Netherlands) PSV Eindhoven	3	1	0	2	3	4	−1	3
(England) West Ham United	3	1	0	2	7	9	−2	3

15 October 2014	West Ham United (England)	3–5	(Spain) Athletic Bilbao	London
19:00	Fanimo 18'; Lee 77'; Bywater 90'	Report	García 2', 89'; Seguin 19'; Pask (o.g.) 32'; Barco 91'	Stadium: Upton Park; Referee: Ashvin Degnarain

28 October 2014	Athletic Bilbao (Spain)	0–1	(Netherlands) PSV Eindhoven	Aldershot
		Report	Vloet 61'	Stadium: Recreation Ground

19 November 2014	West Ham United (England)	2–1	(Netherlands) PSV Eindhoven	London
	Bywater 37'; Sadlier 48'	Report	Rudović 3'	Stadium: Upton Park

8 December 2014	Fulham (England)	3–2	(England) West Ham United	Romford
19:00	Eisfeld 18'; Plumain 45+1'; Casasola 67'	Report	McCallum 25', 35'	Stadium: Rush Green; Attendance: 143; Referee: Ian Fissenden

17 December 2014	Fulham (England)	1–2	(Spain) Athletic Bilbao	New Malden
	Williams 50'	Report	Bilbao 29'; García 33'	Stadium: Motspur Park; Attendance: 108

21 January 2015	Fulham (England)	2–1	(Netherlands) PSV Eindhoven	New Malden
19:00	Plumain 65' (pen.), 90+4' (pen.)	Report	Boljević 20'; Sanoh (red card) 64'	Stadium: Motspur Park; Attendance: 52

=== Group C ===
Team	Pld	W	D	L	GF	GA	GD	Pts
(England) Leicester City	3	3	0	0	7	2	+5	9
(England) Manchester City	3	2	0	1	10	5	+5	6
(Portugal) Benfica	3	1	0	2	2	5	−3	3
(Germany) Schalke 04	3	0	0	3	1	8	−7	0

29 October 2014	Schalke 04 (Germany)	0–1	(Portugal) Benfica	Hyde
			Sanches 59'	Stadium: Ewen Fields

18 November 2014	Leicester City (England)	2–0	(Germany) Schalke 04	Leicester
19:00 GMT	Dodoo 27'; Hopper 58'	Report		Stadium: King Power Stadium; Referee: Ollie Yates

21 November 2014	Manchester City (England)	3–1	(Portugal) Benfica	Hyde
19:00 GMT	Ntcham 8'; Fofana 30'; Barker 40'		Fonte 16'	Stadium: Ewen Fields

24 November 2014	Leicester City (England)	2–0	(Portugal) Benfica	Leicester
19:00 GMT	Lindelöf (o.g.) 11'; Hopper 17'	Report		Stadium: King Power Stadium; Referee: Robert Massey-Ellis

18 January 2015	Manchester City (England)	5–1	(Germany) Schalke 04	Manchester
12:00 GMT	Ambrose 7'; Ntcham 9'; Barker 22'; Byrne 62'; Hiwula 90'	Report	Talarski 37'	Stadium: Academy Stadium; Attendance: 5,800; Referee: Tom Nield

2 February 2015	Manchester City (England)	2–3	(England) Leicester City	Manchester
19:00 GMT	Pozo 4'; Ntcham 20'	Report	Panayiotou 34', 52'; Stankevičius 46'	Stadium: Academy Stadium

=== Group D ===
Team	Pld	W	D	L	GF	GA	GD	Pts
(Scotland) Celtic	3	2	1	0	4	2	+2	7
(England) Everton	3	1	1	1	3	3	0	4
(Spain) Villarreal	3	1	1	1	2	2	0	4
(England) Sunderland	3	0	1	2	1	3	−2	1

25 November 2014	Everton (England)	1–1	(Scotland) Celtic	Walton
19:00 GMT	Duffus 80'	Report	Twardzik 26'	Stadium: Goodison Park; Referee: Robert Massey-Ellis

12 December 2014	Sunderland (England)	0–0	(Spain) Villarreal	Sunderland
19:00 GMT		Report		Stadium: Stadium of Light

18 December 2014	Sunderland (England)	1–2	(Scotland) Celtic	Sunderland
	Ferguson 17'	Report	Griffiths 51', 80'	Stadium: Stadium of Light

21 January 2015	Celtic (Scotland)	1–0	(Spain) Villarreal	Dartford
	McMullan 45'	Report		Stadium: Princes Park

11 February 2015	Everton (England)	1–2	(Spain) Villarreal	Walton
	Henen 55'	Report	Pedraza 3'; Sol 75'	Stadium: Goodison Park

5 March 2015	Everton (England)	1–0	(England) Sunderland	Southport
	Distin 39'	Report		Stadium: Haig Avenue

== Knock-out stages ==
Quarterfinals
C	(England) Leicester City	2 (4)
D	(England) Everton	2 (3)
C	(England) Manchester City	0 (5)
D	(Scotland) Celtic	0 (3)
A	(England) Chelsea	3
B	(England) Fulham	4
B	(Spain) Athletic Bilbao	2
A	(Portugal) Porto	3

Semifinals
C	(England) Leicester City	2
C	(England) Manchester City (aet)	3
B	(England) Fulham	0
A	(Portugal) Porto	3

Finals
C	(England) Manchester City	1
A	(Portugal) Porto	0

Host team listed first
Bold winner

=== Quarter-finals ===
19 February 2015	Chelsea (England)	3–4	(England) Fulham	Aldershot
	Baker 13' (pen.); Houghton 33'; Suljić 53'	Report	Dembélé 2'; Roberts 14'; Suljić 67' (o.g.); Taggart 82'	Stadium: The Recreation Ground; Referee: John Busby

8 April 2015	Athletic Bilbao (Spain)	2–3	(Portugal) Porto	Romford
	García 88', 90+4' (pen.)	Report	Anderson 37'; Frédéric 52'; Silva 55'	Stadium: Rush Green Stadium

16 April 2015	Manchester City (England)	0–0 (a.e.t.) (5–3 p)	(Scotland) Celtic	Manchester
19:00 BST		Report		Stadium: Academy Stadium; Attendance: 780; Referee: Peter Wright
	Penalties
	Byrne (penalty scored); Barker (penalty scored); Angeliño (penalty scored); Pozo (penalty scored); Smith-Brown (penalty scored)		(penalty scored) McManus; (penalty scored) Chalmers; (penalty scored) Scepovic; (penalty missed) Lindsay

16 April 2015	Leicester City (England)	2–2 (a.e.t.) (4–3 p)	(England) Everton	Leicester
	Panayiotou 20', 94'	Report	Long 10'; Charsley 97'	Stadium: Belvoir Drive; Referee: Andy Hendley
	Penalties
	Dodoo (penalty scored); Chilwell (penalty scored); Stankevičius (penalty missed); Barmby (penalty scored); Moore (penalty scored)		(penalty scored) Ledson; (penalty scored) Dowell; (penalty scored) Walsh; (penalty missed) Kenny; (penalty missed) Browning

=== Semi-finals ===
22 April 2015	Fulham (England)	0–3	(Portugal) Porto	New Malden
	Donnelly (red card) 39'	Report	Silva 41', 60', 90+2'	Stadium: Motspur Park; Attendance: 232; Referee: Derek Eaton

30 April 2015	Manchester City (England)	3–2 (a.e.t.)	(England) Leicester City	Manchester
	Iheanacho 57'; Pozo 84'; Garcia 107'	Report	Panayiotou 33', 63'	Stadium: Academy Stadium; Referee: Rob Massey-Ellis

=== Final ===
8 May 2015	Manchester City (England)	1–0	(Portugal) Porto	Manchester
19:00 BST	Iheanacho 5'	Report		Stadium: Academy Stadium

== Statistics ==
=== Top scorers ===
Rank	Player	Club	Goals
1	(Saint Kitts and Nevis) Harry Panayiotou	Leicester City	6
1	(Portugal) Leandro Silva	Porto	6
3	(Spain) Jorge García	Athletic Bilbao	5
4	(Cameroon) Olivier Ntcham	Manchester City	3
4	(Guadeloupe) Ange-Freddy Plumain	Fulham	3
6	(England) Brandon Barker	Manchester City	2
6	(Germany) Benjamin Berg	Borussia Mönchengladbach	2
6	(England) Kieran Bywater	West Ham United	2
6	(Scotland) Leigh Griffiths	Celtic	2
6	(England) Tom Hopper	Leicester City	2
6	(Nigeria) Kelechi Iheanacho	Manchester City	2
6	(England) Paul McCallum	West Ham United	2
6	(Spain) José Ángel Pozo	Manchester City	2
6	(England) Dominic Solanke	Chelsea	2
15	55 players	N/A	1

=== Own goals ===
Rank	Player	Club	Against	Own Goals
1	(Algeria) Adel Gafaiti	Norwich City	Chelsea	1
1	(Sweden) Victor Lindelöf	Benfica	Leicester City	1
1	(England) Josh Pask	West Ham United	Athletic Bilbao	1
1	(Sweden) Ali Suljić	Chelsea	Fulham	1

=== Clean sheets ===
Rank	Player	Club	Clean sheets
1	(Italy) Leonardo Fasan	Celtic	2
1	(Scotland) Angus Gunn	Manchester City	2
3	(Netherlands) Jesse Bertrams	PSV Eindhoven	1
3	(Portugal) Miguel Santos	Benfica	1
3	(England) Adam Smith	Leicester City	1
3	(England) Ben Hamer	Leicester City	1
3	(England) Russell Griffiths	Everton	1
3	(England) Declan Rudd	Norwich City	1
3	(England) Mitchell Beeney	Chelsea	1
3	(Italy) Vito Mannone	Sunderland	1
3	(Spain) Miguel Bañuz	Villarreal	1
3	(Portugal) Ricardo Nunes	Porto	1

== See also ==
- Premier League International Cup
- 2014–15 Professional U21 Development League
- 2014–15 UEFA Youth League
