= Premier League International Cup =

- Organiser(s): Premier League
- Founded: 2014; 12 years ago
- Region: Europe
- Teams: 32 (group stage); 8 (knockout)
- Related competitions: Premier League 2 (qualifier)
- Current champions: (Germany) Borussia Dortmund (1st title)
- Most championships: (Portugal) Porto (2 titles)
- Website: Official website
- 2026–27 Premier League International Cup

The Premier League International Cup is an English football competition for under-23 teams from across Europe. It was designed to provide players in English Category One academies with the opportunity to match themselves against other elite European footballers from their age group in a competitive environment. The competition was created by the Premier League as part of the organisation's Elite Player Performance Plan and is not sanctioned by UEFA.

== Overview ==
The competition featured under-23 sides from twelve English clubs and twelve other European clubs for the 2017–18 season. Prior the 2016–17 season, eight English and eight other European clubs competed in the competition. English teams qualify via their standing in the Premier League 2 and entry by European clubs is by invitation from the Premier League. For the 2014–15 tournament, the 16 teams were split into four groups of four. Upon completion of the group stage, the winners and runners-up from each group progressed to the quarter-finals, semi-finals and final, all played as single-leg ties. UEFA tried to block the creation of the tournament and refused to sanction its creation. To circumvent this, all games are hosted in England with games involving two foreign teams being held at neutral venues.

As in the Professional U21 Development League, teams are allowed to field three overage outfield players and one overage goalkeeper per match.

The most successful team is Porto with two titles. They won the trophy for two consecutive seasons by beating Sunderland on 17 May 2017 and Arsenal on 8 May 2018.

In April 2026, the Premier League applied to have the competition recognised and sanctioned by UEFA.

== Finals ==
Season	Winners	Score	Runners-up	Losing semi-finalists	Final stage host
2014–15	(England) Manchester City	1–0	(Portugal) Porto	(England) Fulham and (England) Leicester City	Academy Stadium, Manchester
2015–16	(Spain) Villarreal	4–2 (a.e.t.)	(Netherlands) PSV	(England) Chelsea and (Portugal) Porto	The Den, London
2016–17	(Portugal) Porto	5–0	(England) Sunderland	(England) Norwich City and (Wales) Swansea City	Stadium of Light, Sunderland
2017–18	(Portugal) Porto	1–0	(England) Arsenal	(England) Newcastle United and (Spain) Villarreal	Emirates Stadium, London
2018–19	(Germany) Bayern Munich	2–0	(Croatia) Dinamo Zagreb	(England) Reading and (England) Southampton	The Den, London
2019–20	Aborted after the group stage due to the COVID-19 pandemic in England				
2020–21	No competition due to the COVID-19 pandemic in England				
2021–22	No competition due to the COVID-19 pandemic in England				
2022–23	(Netherlands) PSV	3–1 (a.e.t.)	(England) Crystal Palace	(England) Fulham and (Spain) Valencia	Selhurst Park, London
2023–24	(England) Crystal Palace	1–0	(Netherlands) PSV	(England) Everton and (England) West Ham United	Selhurst Park, London
2024–25	(England) Nottingham Forest	0–0 (a.e.t.) (5–4 pen.)	(France) Lyon	(Spain) Athletic Bilbao and (England) Fulham	City Ground, West Bridgford
2025–26	(Germany) Borussia Dortmund	1–0	(Spain) Real Madrid	(Croatia) Dinamo Zagreb and (Spain) Real Sociedad	Adams Park, High Wycombe

== Performances ==
=== By club ===
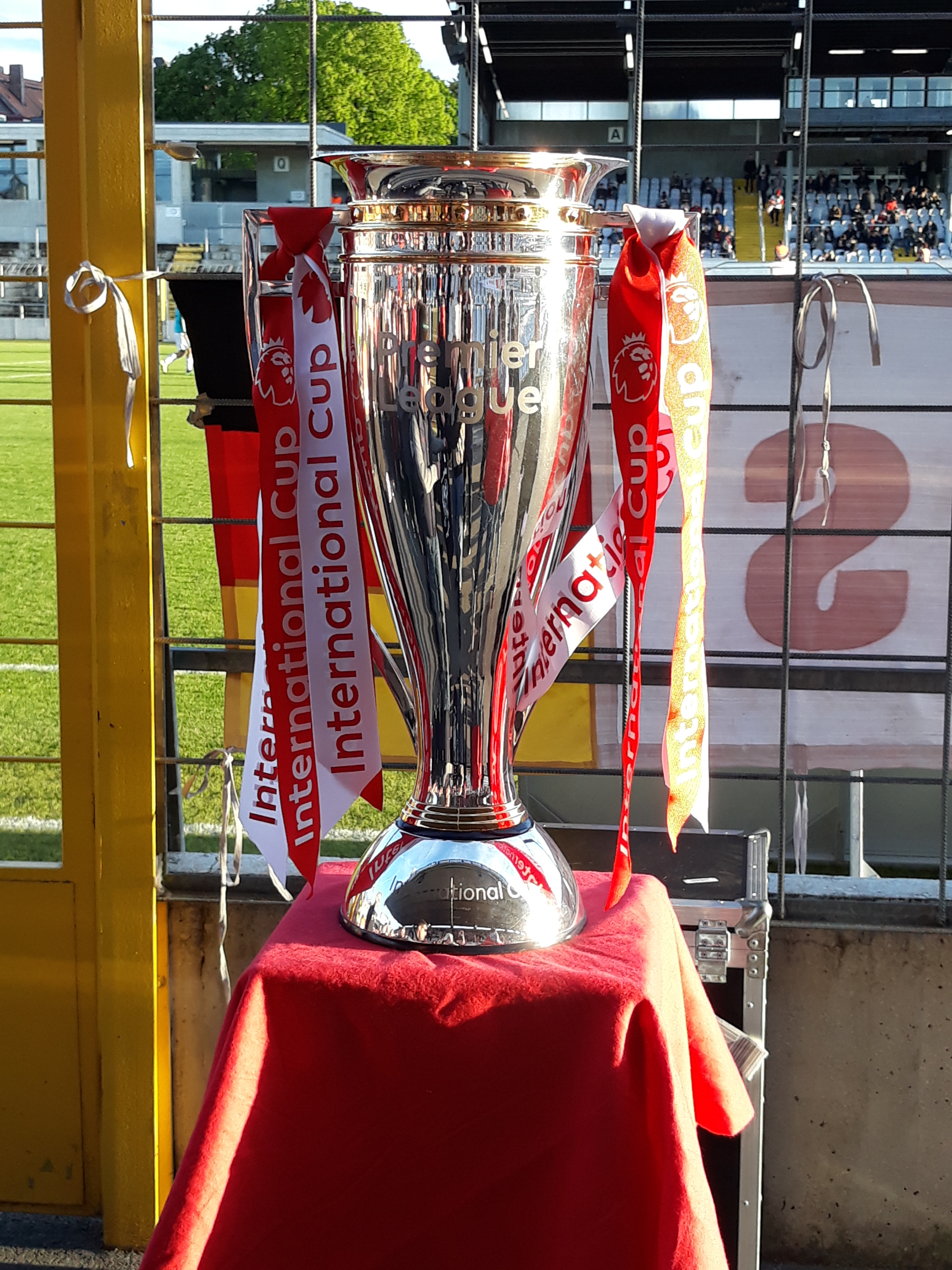
Competition trophy in 2019

Performances in finals by club
Team	Winners	Runners-up	Years won	Years runner-up
(Portugal) Porto	2	1	2016–17, 2017–18	2014–15
(Netherlands) PSV	1	2	2022–23	2015–16, 2023–24
(England) Crystal Palace	1	1	2023–24	2022–23
(England) Manchester City	1	0	2014–15	—
(Spain) Villarreal	1	0	2015–16	—
(Germany) Bayern Munich	1	0	2018–19	—
(England) Nottingham Forest	1	0	2024–25	—
(Germany) Borussia Dortmund	1	0	2025–26	—
(England) Sunderland	0	1	—	2016–17
(England) Arsenal	0	1	—	2017–18
(Croatia) Dinamo Zagreb	0	1	—	2018–19
(France) Lyon	0	1	—	2024–25
(Spain) Real Madrid	0	1	—	2025–26

=== By nation ===
Performances in finals by nation
Country	Winners	Runners-up	Years won	Years runner-up
England	3	3	2014–15, 2023–24, 2024–25	2016–17, 2017–18, 2022–23
Portugal	2	1	2016–17, 2017–18	2014–15
Germany	2	0	2018–19, 2025–26	—
Netherlands	1	2	2022–23	2015–16, 2023–24
Spain	1	1	2015–16	2025–26
Croatia	0	1	—	2018–19
France	0	1	—	2024–25

=== Top scorers by season ===
Season	Player	Club	Goals
2014–15	(Saint Kitts and Nevis) Harry Panayiotou	(England) Leicester City	6
2014–15	(Portugal) Leandro Silva	(Portugal) Porto	6
2015–16	(Jamaica) Kasey Palmer	(England) Chelsea	6
2016–17	(England) Carlton Morris	(England) Norwich City	4
2017–18	(Spain) Adrián Dalmau	(Spain) Villarreal	5
2017–18	(England) James Wilson	(England) Manchester United	5
2018–19	(England) Danny Loader	(England) Reading	5
2019–20	(Wales) Liam Cullen	(Wales) Swansea City	7
2022–23	(Netherlands) Jason van Duiven	(Netherlands) PSV	5
2023–24	(Morocco) Mohamed Nassoh	(Netherlands) PSV	5
2023–24	(France) Romain Perret	(France) Lyon	5
2024–25	(Germany) Ensar Aksakal	(Germany) Hertha BSC	6
2025–26	(Germany) Taycan Etçibaşı	(Germany) Borussia Dortmund	5

== See also ==
- UEFA Youth League
- NextGen Series
