= Nils Körber =

German footballer

Personal information
- Birth name: Nils-Jonathan Körber
- Date of birth: 13 November 1996 (age 29)
- Place of birth: Berlin, Germany
- Height: 1.86 m (6 ft 1 in)
- Position: Goalkeeper

Youth career
- 2009–2011: Tennis Borussia Berlin
- 2011–2015: Hertha BSC

Senior career*
Years	Team	Apps	(Gls)
2012–2022	Hertha BSC II	53	(0)
2015–2022	Hertha BSC	0	(0)
2017–2018	→ Preußen Münster (loan)	20	(0)
2018–2020	→ VfL Osnabrück (loan)	42	(0)
2022–2024	Hansa Rostock	2	(0)
2023	Hansa Rostock II	1	(0)
2024–2026	Greuther Fürth	1	(0)

International career^{‡}
2013–2014	Germany U18	3	(0)
2017–2018	Germany U21	2	(0)
- * Club domestic league appearances and goals as of 31 May 2026 ‡ National team caps and goals as of 21:00, 16 November 2018 (UTC)

Nils-Jonathan Körber (born 13 November 1996) is a German professional footballer who plays as a goalkeeper.

== Club career ==
In the summer of 2022, Körber signed a two-year contract with Hansa Rostock.

On 30 January 2024, Körber moved to Greuther Fürth.

== Career statistics ==
As of match played 2 August 2025

Appearances and goals by club, season and competition
Club	Season	League			DFB Pokal		Continental		Other		Total	
Club	Season	Division	Apps	Goals	Apps	Goals	Apps	Goals	Apps	Goals	Apps	Goals
Hertha BSC II	2013–14	Regionalliga Nordost	0	0	—		—		—		0	0
Hertha BSC II	2014–15	Regionalliga Nordost	5	0	—		—		—		5	0
Hertha BSC II	2015–16	Regionalliga Nordost	19	0	—		—		—		19	0
Hertha BSC II	2016–17	Regionalliga Nordost	15	0	—		—		—		15	0
Hertha BSC II	2020–21	Regionalliga Nordost	6	0	—		—		—		6	0
Hertha BSC II	2021–22	Regionalliga Nordost	8	0	—		—		—		8	0
Hertha BSC II	Total		53	0	—		—		—		53	0
Hertha BSC	2015–16	Bundesliga	0	0	0	0	—		—		0	0
Hertha BSC	2016–17	Bundesliga	0	0	0	0	0	0	—		0	0
Hertha BSC	2020–21	Bundesliga	0	0	0	0	—		—		0	0
Hertha BSC	2021–22	Bundesliga	0	0	0	0	—		0	0	0	0
Hertha BSC	Total		0	0	0	0	0	0	0	0	0	0
Preußen Münster (loan)	2017–18	3. Liga	20	0	—		—		—		20	0
VfL Osnabrück (loan)	2018–19	3. Liga	34	0	—		—		—		34	0
VfL Osnabrück (loan)	2019–20	2. Bundesliga	8	0	1	0	—		—		9	0
VfL Osnabrück (loan)	Total		42	0	1	0	—		—		43	0
Hansa Rostock	2022–23	2. Bundesliga	0	0	1	0	—		—		1	0
Hansa Rostock	2023–24	2. Bundesliga	2	0	0	0	—		—		2	0
Hansa Rostock	Total		2	0	1	0	—		—		3	0
Hansa Rostock II	2023–24	Regionalliga Nordost	1	0	—		—		—		1	0
Greuther Fürth	2023–24	2. Bundesliga	0	0	0	0	—		—		0	0
Greuther Fürth	2024–25	2. Bundesliga	1	0	0	0	—		—		1	0
Greuther Fürth	2025–26	2. Bundesliga	0	0	0	0	—		—		0	0
Greuther Fürth	Total		1	0	0	0	—		—		1	0
Greuther Fürth II	2023–24	Regionalliga Bayern	1	0	—		—		—		1	0
Greuther Fürth II	2025–26	Regionalliga Bayern	1	0	—		—		—		1	0
Greuther Fürth II	Total		2	0	—		—		—		2	0
Career total			121	0	2	0	0	0	0	0	123	0
