= Antonio Leal (footballer) =

Spanish footballer (born 1999)

Personal information
- Full name: Antonio Leal Mateos
- Date of birth: 28 January 1999 (age 27)
- Place of birth: Villamartín, Spain
- Height: 1.89 m (6 ft 2 in)
- Position: Centre-back

Team information
- Current team: Feirense
- Number: 4

Youth career
- Cádiz
- 2017–2018: Villarreal

Senior career*
Years	Team	Apps	(Gls)
2018–2021	Villarreal C	54	(1)
2020–2021	→ Recreativo (loan)	21	(0)
2021–2022	Levante B	31	(0)
2022–2023	Unionistas	28	(0)
2023–2024	Ponferradina	29	(1)
2024–2025	Gimnàstic	30	(0)
2025–	Feirense	32	(1)
- * Club domestic league appearances and goals as of 19 June 2026

Antonio Leal Mateos (born 28 January 1999) is a Spanish footballer who plays as a centre-back for Portuguese club CD Feirense.

== Career ==
Born in Villamartín, Cádiz, Andalusia, Leal joined Villarreal CF's youth sides in 2017, from Cádiz CF. In the following year, after finishing his formation, he was promoted to the C-team in Tercera División, making his senior debut on 9 September of that year by starting in a 2–0 away loss to CD Eldense.

On 1 October 2020, Leal was loaned to Segunda División B side Recreativo de Huelva, for one year. The following 17 July, after suffering relegation, he left Villarreal and signed for another reserve team, Atlético Levante UD in Segunda División RFEF.

On 25 August 2022, after another relegation, Leal agreed to a contract with Primera Federación side Unionistas de Salamanca CF. On 11 July of the following year, he moved to fellow league team SD Ponferradina on a one-year deal.

On 14 July 2024, Leal signed a two-year contract with Gimnàstic de Tarragona also in division three. Despite being a regular starter during most of the campaign, he lost his starting spot to youth prospect Enric Pujol during the play-offs, as his side narrowly missed out promotion.

On 9 July 2025, Leal terminated his link with Nàstic. Five days later, he moved abroad for the first time in his career, joining Liga Portugal 2 side CD Feirense.
