= Cláudio Ribeiro =

Portuguese footballer

Personal information
- Full name: Cláudio Filipe Maia Ribeiro
- Date of birth: 29 May 1995 (age 31)
- Place of birth: Vila das Aves, Portugal
- Height: 1.81 m (5 ft 11 1/2 in)
- Position: Winger

Team information
- Current team: Porto B (on loan from Vitória Guimarães B)
- Number: 67

Youth career
- 2003–2008: Aves
- 2008–2010: Vitória Guimarães
- 2010–2011: Os Sandinenses
- 2011–2014: Vitória Guimarães

Senior career*
| Years | Team | Apps | (Gls) |
| 2013– | Vitória Guimarães B | 11 | (0) |
| 2015– | → Porto B (loan) | 18 | (2) |
- * Club domestic league appearances and goals as of 2 July 2016

Cláudio Filipe Maia Ribeiro (born 29 May 1995 in Vila das Aves) is a Portuguese footballer who plays for FC Porto B on loan from Vitória Guimarães B, as a forward.
