= Pedrito (footballer, born 1996) =

Spanish footballer

Personal information
- Full name: Pedro Martínez García
- Date of birth: 9 February 1996 (age 30)
- Place of birth: Dolores, Spain
- Position: Midfielder

Youth career
- 2008–2015: Villarreal

Senior career*
Years	Team	Apps	(Gls)
2015–2017	Villarreal C	28	(4)
2015–2019	Villarreal B	41	(3)
2019	Logroñés	12	(0)
2019	Zemplín Michalovce	11	(2)
2020–2021	Fastav Zlín	21	(1)
2021–2022	Košice	6	(1)
- * Club domestic league appearances and goals as of 23 May 2023

Pedro Martínez García (born 9 February 1996), commonly known as Pedrito, is a Spanish footballer who plays as a midfielder.

== Club career ==
Born in Dolores, Pedrito is a graduate of the Villarreal's youth setup, after having joined the academy at the age of 12. In 2015, he was promoted to Villarreal C. On 25 October 2015, he made his debut for the reserves, coming as a 68th minute substitute for Fran Sol in a 1–0 defeat against Badalona.

On 18 November 2015, Pedrito injured his ligaments during a training session, and returned to play in December 2016, featuring in a league match for the C-team against Muro. On 7 December 2017, he made his first team debut for the senior team, coming on as a substitute for Roberto Soriano in a 1–0 defeat against Maccabi Tel Aviv in the UEFA Europa League.

On 18 January 2020, Pedrito joined Czech club Fastav Zlín on a contract until the summer 2022.

== Club statistics ==
As of match played on 20 October 2018

Club	Season	League			Cup		Other		Total	
Club	Season	Division	Apps	Goals	Apps	Goals	Apps	Goals	Apps	Goals
Villarreal C	2015–16	Tercera División	7	2	—		—		13	0
Villarreal C	2016–17	Tercera División	21	2	—		—		21	2
Villarreal C	Total		28	2	—		—		28	2
Villarreal B	2015–16	Segunda División B	5	0	—		—		5	0
Villarreal B	2017–18	Segunda División B	25	3	—		1 (Note: Appearance in Promotion Play-offs)	0	26	3
Villarreal B	2018–19	Segunda División B	7	0	—		—		7	0
Villarreal B	Total		37	3	—		1	0	38	3
Villarreal	2017–18	La Liga	0	0	0	0	1 (Note: Appearances in UEFA Europa League)	0	1	0
Career total			65	5	0	0	2	0	67	5
