= Santiago Irala =

Paraguayan footballer (born 1999)

Personal information
- Full name: Santiago Javier Irala Vera
- Date of birth: 3 January 1999 (age 27)
- Height: 1.85 m (6 ft 1 in)
- Position: Forward

Team information
- Current team: Marítimo B

Youth career
- Rubio Ñu

Senior career*
Years	Team	Apps	(Gls)
2015–2018	Rubio Ñu	44	(5)
2017–2018	→ Porto B (loan)	21	(9)
2018–2019	Porto B	7	(3)
2020	Plaza Colonia	0	(0)
2020–	Marítimo B	9	(3)
- * Club domestic league appearances and goals as of 17:34, 17 June 2021 (UTC)

Santiago Javier Irala Vera, known as Santiago Irala (born 3 January 1999) is a Paraguayan football player. He plays in Portugal for C.S. Marítimo B.

== Club career ==
He made his Paraguayan Primera División debut for Rubio Ñu on 1 February 2015 in a game against Olimpia.
