= Villarreal CF B =

Villarreal B
- Full name: Villarreal Club de Fútbol S.A.D. "B"
- Nicknames: El Mini Submarino (Mini Submarine)
- Founded: 1999; 27 years ago
- Ground: Estadio de la Cerámica
- Capacity: 23,008
- President: Fernando Roig
- Head coach: David Albelda
- League: Primera Federación – Group 2
- 2025–26: Primera Federación – Group 2, 4th of 20
Home colours	Away colours	Third colours

Villarreal Club de Fútbol "B" is a Spanish football team based in Villarreal, in the autonomous community of Valencia. Founded in 1999, it is the reserve team of Villarreal CF and plays in Primera Federación – Group 2, holding home games at Estadio de la Cerámica, with a 23,008-seat capacity.

== Background ==
Unlike in other nations such as England, reserve teams in Spain play in the same football pyramid as their senior team rather than a separate league. However, reserve teams cannot play in the same division as their senior team. Therefore, the team is ineligible for promotion to the division in which the main side plays. Also, if the main team is relegated to the division in which its reserve side played in the prior season (which happened in 2011–12), the reserve team is automatically relegated to the division below the main team. Reserve teams are also no longer permitted to enter the Copa del Rey.

== Premier League International Cup ==
Villarreal successfully applied to compete in the 2014–15, 2015–16 and 2016–17 versions of the England-based Premier League International Cup. They won the tournament in 2016, beating PSV in the final. Most of Villarreal's players in this Under-23 tournament have been drawn from the B side with some additions from C Team and the Juvenil group.

== Season to season ==
Season	Tier	Division	Place
1999–2000	7	2ª Reg.	2nd
2000–01	6	1ª Reg.	1st
2001–02	5	Reg. Pref.	5th
2002–03	5	Reg. Pref.	1st
2003–04	4	3ª	3rd
2004–05	4	3ª	5th
2005–06	4	3ª	1st
2006–07	4	3ª	2nd
2007–08	3	2ª B	11th
2008–09	3	2ª B	2nd
2009–10	2	2ª	7th
2010–11	2	2ª	17th
2011–12	2	2ª	12th
2012–13	3	2ª B	9th
2013–14	3	2ª B	11th
2014–15	3	2ª B	10th
2015–16	3	2ª B	2nd
2016–17	3	2ª B	6th
2017–18	3	2ª B	2nd
2018–19	3	2ª B	3rd

Season	Tier	Division	Place
2019–20	3	2ª B	6th
2020–21	3	2ª B	3rd / 6th
2021–22	3	1ª RFEF	2nd
2022–23	2	2ª	18th
2023–24	2	2ª	22nd
2024–25	3	1ª Fed.	11th
2025–26	3	1ª Fed.	4th
2026–27	3	1ª Fed.	

- 5 seasons in Segunda División
- 4 seasons in Primera Federación/Primera División RFEF
- 11 seasons in Segunda División B
- 4 seasons in Tercera División
- 4 seasons in Categorías Regionales

== Players ==
=== Current squad ===
As of 1 September 2026

Note: Flags indicate national team as defined under FIFA eligibility rules; some limited exceptions apply. Players may hold more than one non-FIFA nationality.

No.	Pos.	Nation	Player
1	GK	UKR	Yakiv Kinareykin
2	DF	ESP	Jan Encuentra
3	DF	ESP	Eneko Ortiz
4	DF	ESP	Enric Pujol
5	DF	ESP	Álvaro García (on loan from Alavés)
6	MF	ESP	Pablo Pascual
7	FW	ESP	Joselillo Gaitán
8	MF	SEN	Cheikh Thiam
9	FW	ESP	Albert García
10	MF	ARG	Facundo Viveros
11	MF	ESP	César Bonafé
12	DF	ESP	Nico Sánchez
13	GK	ESP	Alex Quevedo

No.	Pos.	Nation	Player
14	MF	ESP	Arnau Forés
15	DF	NGA	Chukwuma Eze (on loan from Oviedo)
16	MF	ESP	Álvaro Alcalde
17	FW	ESP	Nizar El Jmili
18	FW	ESP	Valen Gómez
19	FW	MLI	Mahamoud Barry
20	DF	ARG	Nico Barattucci
21	DF	MLI	Manfa Keita
22	FW	MLI	Douga Fofana
23	DF	SEN	Moussa Diallo
24	FW	MAR	Ayman Arguigue
26	DF	ESP	Alejandro Palomares
27	DF	ESP	Pedro Luque

=== Reserve team ===
Note: Flags indicate national team as defined under FIFA eligibility rules; some limited exceptions apply. Players may hold more than one non-FIFA nationality.

No.	Pos.	Nation	Player
28	MF	ESP	Moussa Traoré

== Coaching staff ==
Position	Staff
Head coach	(Spain) David Albelda
Assistant Head Coach	(Spain) Edgar Chumillas (Spain) Xavi Calabuig
Goalkeeping Coach	(Argentina) Mariano Barbosa
Delegate	(Spain) Javier Loscos
Fitness Coach	(Spain) Alejandro Valle (Spain) David Pérez
Analyst	(Spain) Carlos Mulet (Spain) Alejandro Rodríguez
Head of medical services	(Spain) Pablo Montaner
Physiotherapist	(Spain) David Gozalbo (Spain) Jorge Ten (Spain) Julián Jiménez
Readaptator	(Spain) Edu Alija
Psychologist	(Spain) Cristian Segovia
Kit man	(Spain) Brian Porcar
Field delegate	(Spain) Miguel Escorihuela

Last updated: June 2026
Source: Villarreal CF

== See also ==
- Villarreal CF – First team
- Villarreal CF C – Third team
