= Nils Blumberg =

German footballer

Personal information
- Date of birth: 2 January 1997 (age 29)
- Place of birth: Berlin, Germany
- Height: 1.72 m (5 ft 8 in)
- Position: Forward

Youth career
- SV Rot-Weiß Flatow
- SG Vehlefanz
- –2010: Nordberliner SC
- 2010–2016: Hertha BSC

Senior career*
Years	Team	Apps	(Gls)
2016–2019	Hertha BSC II	59	(9)
2019–2020	Chemnitzer FC	11	(0)
2020–2022	Alemannia Aachen	16	(1)
- * Club domestic league appearances and goals

Nils Blumberg (born 2 January 1997) is a German former footballer who played as a forward.

== Career ==
Blumberg made his professional debut for Chemnitzer FC in the 3. Liga on 28 July 2019, coming on as a substitute in the 65th minute for Pascal Itter in the 3–2 away loss against Viktoria Köln.
