= 2018–19 Premier League International Cup =

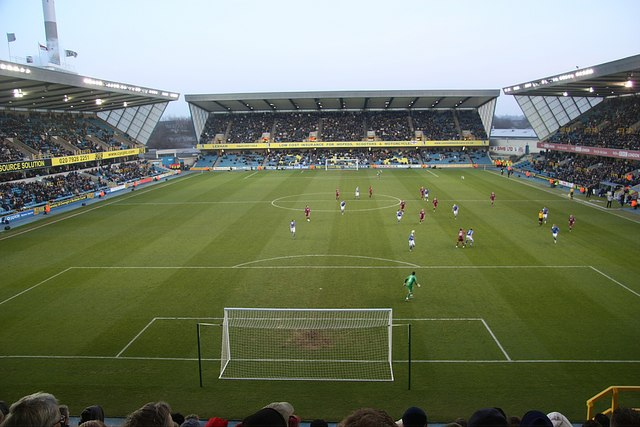
- The Den in South Bermondsey, London hosted the final

Tournament details
- Dates: 14 August 2018 – 2 May 2019
- Teams: 24 (from 8 associations)

Final positions
- Champions: (Germany) Bayern Munich (1st title)
- Runners-up: (Croatia) Dinamo Zagreb (1st Runner Up)

Tournament statistics
- Matches played: 43
- Goals scored: 138 (3.21 per match)
- Top scorer(s): (England) Danny Loader Reading (5 goals)

The 2018–19 Premier League International Cup was the fifth season of the Premier League International Cup, a European club football competition organised by the Premier League for under-23 players. Bayern won the title by defeating Dinamo Zagreb 2–0 in the final.

Porto were the defending champions, after beating Arsenal 1–0 in the previous season's final, but were eliminated in the group stage.

== Format ==
The competition featured twenty-four teams: twelve from English league system and twelve invitees from other European countries. The teams were split into six groups of four - with two English league clubs per group. The group winners, and two best runners-up, progressed into the knockout phase of the tournament. The knockout matches were single leg fixtures.

All matches - including fixtures between non-English teams - were played in England and Wales.

=== Teams ===
Athletic Bilbao, Benfica, Everton, Leicester City, PSV Eindhoven, Porto and Villarreal made their fifth appearance in the competition. They are the only teams to take part in every season since the tournament was founded in 2014. Brighton & Hove Albion, Paris Saint-Germain and Southampton made their debuts.

English league system:

- (England) Brighton & Hove Albion
- (England) Derby County
- (England) Everton
- (England) Leicester City
- (England) Liverpool
- (England) Manchester United
- (England) Norwich City
- (England) Reading
- (England) Southampton
- (England) Tottenham Hotspur
- (England) West Ham United
- (Wales) Swansea City

Other countries:

- (Germany) Bayern Munich
- (Germany) VfL Wolfsburg
- (Germany) Hertha BSC
- (Spain) Athletic Bilbao
- (Spain) Villarreal
- (Portugal) Porto
- (Portugal) Benfica
- (Netherlands) PSV Eindhoven
- (Netherlands) Feyenoord
- (France) Paris Saint-Germain
- (Croatia) Dinamo Zagreb
- (Czech Republic) Sparta Prague

== Group stage ==
Color key in group tables
Group winners and the two best runners-up advance to the quarterfinals

=== Group A ===
Team	Pld	W	D	L	GF	GA	GD	Pts
(England) Southampton	3	2	1	0	5	1	+4	7
(Croatia) Dinamo Zagreb	3	2	0	1	6	2	+4	6
(England) West Ham United	3	1	0	2	2	6	−4	3
(Portugal) Porto	3	0	1	2	3	7	−4	1

14 August 2018	Southampton (England)	1–0	(Croatia) Dinamo Zagreb	Marchwood
19:00 BST (UTC+1)	Gallagher 20'	Report		Stadium: Staplewood Campus; Referee: Adrian Quelch

26 September 2018	Southampton (England)	1–1	(Portugal) Porto	Marchwood
19:00 BST (UTC+1)	Barnes 50'	Report Report	Rui Pedro 61' (pen.)	Stadium: Staplewood Campus; Attendance: 180; Referee: Joshua Smith

30 October 2018	West Ham United (England)	2–1	(Portugal) Porto	Dagenham
19:00 GMT	Longelo 29'; Hector-Ingram 87'	Report	Gleison 69'	Stadium: Victoria Road; Referee: Paul Howard

13 November 2018	West Ham United (England)	0–2	(Croatia) Dinamo Zagreb	Dagenham
19:00 GMT		Report	Knežević 25', 64'	Stadium: Victoria Road

24 November 2018	Porto (Portugal)	1–4	(Croatia) Dinamo Zagreb	Dagenham
16:00 GMT	Baró 16'	Report	Šipoš 30'; Menalo 33', 70'; Knežević 43'	Stadium: Victoria Road; Referee: Sam Purkiss

11 December 2018	Southampton (England)	3–0	(England) West Ham United	Marchwood
19:00 GMT	Johnson 27'; Barnes 30'; Ferry 66'	Report Report		Stadium: Staplewood Campus; Attendance: 100; Referee: Carl Brook

=== Group B ===
Team	Pld	W	D	L	GF	GA	GD	Pts
(England) Reading	3	2	1	0	6	2	+4	7
(England) Leicester City	3	2	0	1	4	3	+1	6
(Netherlands) Feyenoord	3	1	0	2	9	5	+4	3
(Czech Republic) Sparta Prague	3	0	1	2	2	11	−9	1

17 August 2018	Leicester City (England)	0–2	(England) Reading	Whetstone
19:00 BST (UTC+1)		Report	Coleman 25'*; House 53'	Stadium: Holmes Park; Attendance: 169; Referee: James Oldham

24 October 2018	Reading (England)	2–2	(Czech Republic) Sparta Prague	Reading
19:00 BST (UTC+1)	Loader 51', 90+5'	Report	Novotný 57'; Patrák 67'	Stadium: Madejski Stadium; Referee: Will Finnie

27 November 2018	Sparta Prague (Czech Republic)	0–8	(Netherlands) Feyenoord	Aldershot
19:00 GMT		Report	Zwarts 10', 39', 48', 75'; Burger 16'; Touré 22'; Kökçü 35'; St. Juste 51'	Stadium: Recreation Ground; Referee: Will Finnie

29 November 2018	Leicester City (England)	1–0	(Czech Republic) Sparta Prague	Whetstone
19:00 GMT	Knight 85'	Report		Stadium: Holmes Park; Attendance: 122; Referee: Richard Hulme

19 December 2018	Reading (England)	2–0	(Netherlands) Feyenoord	Reading
19:00 GMT	Edwards 18'; House 83'	Report		Stadium: Madejski Stadium; Referee: Adrian Quelch

29 January 2019	Leicester City (England)	3–1	(Netherlands) Feyenoord	Whetstone
19:00 GMT	Muskwe (penalty missed) 11' 75', 84'; Knight 56'	Report	Vente 39'	Stadium: Holmes Park; Referee: Simeon Lucas

- Leicester City's match against Feyenoord was originally scheduled for 30 October 2018, however on 27 October 2018, Leicester City owner Vichai Srivaddhanaprabha's helicopter crashed outside the King Power Stadium shortly after taking off from the pitch, killing Srivaddhanaprabha and all four other people on board. The Feyenoord match was one of the club fixtures postponed as a result.

=== Group C ===
Team	Pld	W	D	L	GF	GA	GD	Pts
(England) Tottenham Hotspur	3	2	1	0	9	7	+2	7
(Germany) VfL Wolfsburg	3	1	1	1	7	4	+3	4
(Spain) Athletic Bilbao	3	1	0	2	7	9	−2	3
(England) Norwich City	3	0	2	1	4	7	−3	2

26 September 2018	Athletic Bilbao (Spain)	0–4	(Germany) VfL Wolfsburg	Aldershot
19:00 BST (UTC+1)	Benito (red card) 78'	Report 1 Report 2	Herrmann 15', 39'; Seguin 45+3' (pen.); Itter 90+3'	Stadium: Recreation Ground; Referee: Samuel Allison

14 November 2018	Norwich City (England)	0–3	(Spain) Athletic Bilbao	Norwich
19:00 GMT		Report	Villalibre 30', 48'; Rojo 75'	Stadium: Carrow Road; Attendance: 1,130; Referee: David Rock

3 December 2018	Tottenham Hotspur (England)	2–1	(Germany) VfL Wolfsburg	Stevenage
19:00 GMT	Roles 45+2'; Sterling 47'	ReportReport	Hanslik 82'	Stadium: Lamex Stadium; Attendance: 433; Referee: Savvas Yianni

13 December 2018	Norwich City (England)	2–2	(Germany) VfL Wolfsburg	Norwich
19:00 GMT	Oliveira 34'; Spyrou 79'	Report	Kramer 53'; Hanslik 63'	Stadium: Carrow Road; Attendance: 750 Estimated; Referee: Alan Dale

18 January 2019	Norwich City (England)	2–2	(England) Tottenham Hotspur	Colney
19:00 GMT	Spyrou 39'; Þorvaldsson 81'	Report	Oakley-Boothe 36'; Roles 70'	Stadium: Colney Training Centre

23 January 2019	Tottenham Hotspur (England)	5–4	(Spain) Athletic Bilbao	Stevenage
19:00 GMT	Janssen 4'; Roles 15', 66'; Tracey 83'; Georgiou 86'	Report 1 Report 2	Villalibre 38'; Vicente (penalty missed) 47' 59'; San Bartolomé 64'; Benito 90+2'	Stadium: Lamex Stadium; Attendance: 465; Referee: Tom Reeves

=== Group D ===
Team	Pld	W	D	L	GF	GA	GD	Pts
(Germany) Bayern Munich	3	2	0	1	6	2	+4	6
(England) Brighton & Hove Albion	3	1	1	1	4	4	0	4
(England) Everton	3	1	1	1	5	6	−1	4
(Portugal) Benfica	3	1	0	2	1	4	−3	3

20 September 2018	Brighton & Hove Albion (England)	2–2	(England) Everton	Lancing
19:00 BST (UTC+1)	Barclay 59'; Tilley 67'	Report	Sambou 25' (pen.); Simms 74'	Stadium: American Express Elite Football Performance Centre; Referee: Carl Brook

28 September 2018	Everton (England)	2–0	(Portugal) Benfica	Southport
19:00 BST (UTC+1)	Broadhead 26'; Bowler 27'	Report		Stadium: Haig Avenue; Attendance: 156; Referee: Glen Hart

22 October 2019	Brighton & Hove Albion (England)	2–0	(Portugal) Benfica	Lancing
19:00 BST (UTC+1)	Gyökeres 11' (pen.); Connolly 25'	Report		Stadium: American Express Elite Football Performance Centre; Referee: Gary Parsons

12 December 2018	Everton (England)	1–4	(Germany) Bayern Munich	Walton
19:00 GMT	Broadhead 78'	Report	Browning 27' (o.g.); Çuni 81'; Jeong 84'; Wriedt 90+3'	Stadium: Goodison Park; Referee: Joe Joseph

27 January 2019	Bayern Munich (Germany)	0–1	(Portugal) Benfica	Aldershot
13:00 GMT	Wriedt (penalty missed) 90'	Report	Santos 70'	Stadium: Recreation Ground; Referee: Sam Purkiss

30 January 2019	Brighton & Hove Albion (England)	0–2	(Germany) Bayern Munich	Lancing
19:00 GMT		Report	Nollenberger 78'; Jelisić 90+3'	Stadium: American Express Elite Football Performance Centre; Referee: Gary Parsons

=== Group E ===
Team	Pld	W	D	L	GF	GA	GD	Pts
(Spain) Villarreal	3	2	1	0	9	1	+8	7
(England) Liverpool	3	2	0	1	5	8	−3	6
(Germany) Hertha BSC	3	1	0	2	5	5	0	3
(Wales) Swansea City	3	0	1	2	2	7	−5	1

26 September 2018	Swansea City (Wales)	1–1	(Spain) Villarreal	Landore
19:00 BST (UTC+1)	Marić 90+7'	Report	Akale 65' (pen.)	Stadium: Landore Training Centre; Referee: Tom Reeves

17 October 2018	Hertha BSC (Germany)	0–1	(Spain) Villarreal	Aldershot
19:00 BST (UTC+1)		Report	González 73'	Stadium: Recreation Ground; Referee: Richard Hulme

21 November 2018	Liverpool (England)	0–7	(Spain) Villarreal	Kirkby
19:00 GMT		Report	González 4', 15'; Lozano 6'; Vujnović 25' (pen.), 63'; Riera 53'; Akale 90+3'	Stadium: The Academy; Referee: Peter Gibbons

5 December 2018	Liverpool (England)	3–1	(Germany) Hertha BSC	Kirkby
19:00 GMT	McAuley 10'; Larouci 31'; Millar 46'	Report	Covic 4'	Stadium: The Academy; Referee: Simeon Lucas

13 December 2018	Swansea City (Wales)	1–4	(Germany) Hertha BSC	Landore
19:00 GMT	Evans 36'	Report	Siakam-Tchokoten 27'; Covic 43'; Friede 75', 90+3'	Stadium: Landore Training Centre; Referee: Samuel Allison

24 January 2019	Liverpool (England)	2–0	(Wales) Swansea City	Kirkby
19:00 GMT	Marković 16'; McAuley 77'	Report		Stadium: The Academy; Referee: Andrew Miller

=== Group F ===
Team	Pld	W	D	L	GF	GA	GD	Pts
(England) Manchester United	3	1	2	0	4	1	+3	5
(England) Derby County	3	1	2	0	5	3	+2	5
(Netherlands) PSV Eindhoven	3	1	1	1	5	5	0	4
(France) Paris Saint-Germain	3	0	1	2	3	8	−5	1

28 September 2018	Derby County (England)	1–1	(France) Paris Saint-Germain	Loughborough
19:00 BST (UTC+1)	Cresswell 56'	Report	Luzayadio 25'	Stadium: Loughborough University Stadium; Referee: Gareth Rhodes

31 October 2018	Derby County (England)	3–1	(Netherlands) PSV Eindhoven	Loughborough
19:00 GMT	Cresswell 11'; Butterfield 50' (pen.); Mitchell-Lawson 79'	Report	Piroe 74'	Stadium: Loughborough University Stadium; Referee: Leigh Doughty

6 December 2018	Paris Saint-Germain (France)	2–4	(Netherlands) PSV Eindhoven	Woking
19:00 GMT	Toufiqui 77'; Adli 78'	Report	Piroe 9', 17'; Lundqvist 77' (pen.); Aboukhlal 90'	Stadium: Kingfield Stadium

20 December 2018	Derby County (England)	1–1	(England) Manchester United	Loughborough
19:00 GMT	Sibley 65'	Report	Burkart 18'	Stadium: Loughborough University Stadium; Referee: Matthew Dicicco

17 January 2019	Manchester United (England)	0–0	(Netherlands) PSV Eindhoven	Leigh
19:00 GMT		Report		Stadium: Leigh Sports Village; Attendance: 652; Referee: James Oldman

25 January 2019	Manchester United (England)	3–0	(France) Paris Saint-Germain	Leigh
19:00 GMT	McTominay 2'; Chong 6', 17'	Report		Stadium: Leigh Sports Village; Attendance: 1,019

=== Ranking of second-placed teams ===
Team	Pld	W	D	L	GF	GA	GD	Pts
(Croatia) Dinamo Zagreb	3	2	0	1	6	2	+4	6
(England) Leicester City	3	2	0	1	4	3	+1	6
(England) Liverpool	3	2	0	1	5	8	−3	6
(England) Derby County	3	1	2	0	5	3	+2	5
(Germany) VfL Wolfsburg	3	1	1	1	7	4	+3	4
(England) Everton	3	1	1	1	5	6	−1	4

== Knockout stages ==
Quarter-finals
25 February
(England) Manchester United	1
(England) Reading	3
13 March
(England) Leicester City	1 (4)
(Germany) Bayern Munich (p)	1 (5)
6 March
(England) Southampton	2
(Spain) Villarreal	1
26 February
(England) Tottenham Hotspur	0
(Croatia) Dinamo Zagreb	1

Semi-finals
1 April – Madejski Stadium
(England) Reading	1
(Germany) Bayern Munich	3
10 April – St. Mary's Stadium
(England) Southampton	1
(Croatia) Dinamo Zagreb	3

Final
2 May – The Den
(Germany) Bayern Munich	2
(Croatia) Dinamo Zagreb	0

=== Quarter-finals ===
25 February 2019	Manchester United (England)	1–3	(England) Reading	Leigh
19:00 GMT	Levitt 42' (pen.)	Report	Loader 13', 27', 79' (pen.)	Stadium: Leigh Sports Village; Attendance: 654; Referee: Peter Gibbons

26 February 2019	Tottenham Hotspur (England)	0–1	(Croatia) Dinamo Zagreb	Stevenage
19:00 GMT	Tracey (red card) 90+3'	Report Report	Ćuže 62'; Čalušić (red card) 90+2'	Stadium: Lamex Stadium; Attendance: 438; Referee: Will Finnie

6 March 2019	Southampton (England)	2–1	(Spain) Villarreal	Marchwood
19:00 GMT	Smallbone 31' (pen.); O'Connor 61'; Norton (red card) 90+3'; Johnson (red card) 90+6'	Report Report	Álvarez 59'; Blanco (red card) 90+6'	Stadium: Staplewood Campus; Attendance: 0 Referee: Joshua Smith

13 March 2019	Leicester City (England)	1–1 (a.e.t.) (4–5 p)	(Germany) Bayern Munich	Whetstone
19:00 GMT	Pașcanu 90+5'	Report	Wriedt 13'	Stadium: Holmes Park; Attendance: 465; Referee: Lloyd Wood
	Penalties
	Wright (penalty scored); Muskwe (penalty scored); Sherif (penalty scored); Ndukwu (penalty missed); Dewsbury-Hall (penalty scored)		(penalty scored) Wriedt; (penalty scored) Rochelt; (penalty scored) Feldhahn; (penalty scored) Lange; (penalty scored) Köhn

=== Semi-finals ===
1 April 2019	Reading (England)	1–3	(Germany) Bayern Munich	Reading
19:00 BST	Frost 90+3'	Report	Wriedt (penalty missed) 29'; Shabani 50'; Nollenberger 88'; Köhn 90+6'	Stadium: Madejski Stadium; Attendance: 2,157; Referee: Paul Howard

10 April 2019	Southampton (England)	1–3	(Croatia) Dinamo Zagreb	Southampton
19:45 BST	Hamblin 22' (red card) 36'	Report	Šipoš 10'; Gjira 54'; Čuić 82'	Stadium: St. Mary's Stadium; Attendance: 3,605; Referee: Joshua Smith

=== Final ===
2 May 2019	Bayern Munich (Germany)	2–0	(Croatia) Dinamo Zagreb	South Bermondsey
19:00 BST	Wriedt 46'; Shabani 90+1'	Report		Stadium: The Den; Referee: David Rock
