= Reading F.C. Under-23s and Academy =

Reading Under-21s
- Full name: Reading Football Club (Under-21s & Academy)
- Nickname: The Royals
- Ground: Madejski Stadium, Bearwood Park
- Chairman: Rob Couhig
- Manager: Michael Gilkes (Academy); Peter Scott (Under-21s); Harrison Gilkes (Under-18s)
- League: U21 – Professional Development League; U18 – U18 Professional Development League
- 2024–25: U21s – 20th U18s – 8th
Home colours

The Reading Academy refers to the development teams of Reading Football Club. The club takes part in the Professional Development League system, with the Under-21 competing in the Premier League 2, and the Under-18 competing in the Professional U18 Development League - South.

Under the old youth training scheme, the club produced a number of first team players including Ady Williams, Scott Taylor and future England international Neil Webb. Since the Academy opened in 1999, 91 graduates have gone on to play first team football for Reading including Gylfi Sigurðsson, who was later sold for a club record transfer fee.

== History ==
Reading were granted Academy status by the Football Association in February 1999. The first Academy manager was John Stephenson who oversaw the club's youth development until October 2000 when he left to join Preston North End. He was succeeded by former Reading goalkeeper, and the then goalkeeping coach, Nick Hammond. After his appointment as Reading's first Director of football in September 2003, Hammond combined all three roles until the appointment of Exeter City boss Eamonn Dolan as the new Academy manager in October 2004. The club originally trained in rented facilities at Sonning Lane and Bradfield College but moved to their own training ground at Hogwood Park in Arborfield in 2004. A two-year Academy partnership with Boreham Wood was announced in July 2012 with the club also aiming to have a first-team composed of 50% Academy players. The introduction in 2012 of the four-tier academy system under the Elite Player Performance Plan (EPPP) forced the club to search for a new training ground in order to meet the criteria for Category One status. With this in mind, the club agreed in principle to buy land at Bearwood Lakes Golf Club for a new training facility at a cost of between £10 million and £20 million in May 2013. In July 2013, the club confirmed they had achieved Category One status.

The Reading reserves competed in the Capital League between 1995 and 1998 before joining The Football Combination which they played in from 1998 until 2006, excluding the 1999–2000 season. With the senior side's promotion to the Premier League in 2006, the reserve team was also promoted to the Premier Reserve League for the 2006–07 season. Under future first-team manager Brian McDermott, the reserves finished top of the Southern section and beat Bolton reserves 2–0 to win the overall title in their first season. They finished second the following year but were relegated as the first team dropped into the Championship. The reserves rejoined the Football Combination following their relegation and remained there until 2010 when they withdrew in order to arrange their own fixtures against a higher level of opposition.

With the club's application for Category One status under the EPPP, the under-21 and Academy (under-18) teams competed in the new Professional Development League 1 for the 2012–13 season. The teams were successful under the new format with the under-18s finishing as runners-up to Fulham in the inaugural competition, and the under-21s winning the first U21 Premier League Cup the following year.

In July 2022, Reading confirmed that their Academy had lost its Category One status as a result of downsizing during the 2020–21 and 2021–22 seasons due to the COVID-19 pandemic in the United Kingdom, and as a result the club the dropped out of the Premier League 2 Division 2 to the Professional Development League. The club also confirmed their intentions to return to a Category One Academy.

== Under-21s ==
The under-21s play their home matches at Bearwood Park, the club's training ground, with four games each season being played at the Madejski Stadium. Three outfield players and one goalkeeper over the age of 23 are allowed to be selected for each fixture, with scholars from the Academy squad also eligible to play.

=== Under-21 squad ===
As of 20 October 2026

Note: Flags indicate national team as defined under FIFA eligibility rules; some limited exceptions apply. Players may hold more than one non-FIFA nationality.

No.	Pos.	Nation	Player
34	FW	ENG	Joseph Barough
35	MF	ENG	Carter Bowdery
37	MF	ENG	Luke Howard
38	DF	GHA	Phillip Duah
40	DF	ENG	Sam Harrison
42	DF	ENG	Boyd Beacroft
48	GK	ENG	Matt Rowley
50	MF	ENG	Jerae Jones

No.	Pos.	Nation	Player
54	MF	GRN	T’Shay St. Louis
60	MF	ENG	Scofield Lonmeni
63	MF	ALB	Matteo Dashi
64	FW	ENG	Torin Ntege
65	MF	ENG	Kevin Mfuamba
66	DF	ENG	Calum Logan
67	MF	ENG	Jeremiah Berkeley-Agyepong

=== Out on loan ===
Note: Flags indicate national team as defined under FIFA eligibility rules; some limited exceptions apply. Players may hold more than one non-FIFA nationality.

No.	Pos.	Nation	Player
36	DF	IRL	John Ryan (on loan at Hampton & Richmond Borough until January 2027)
41	GK	ENG	Harrison Rhone (on loan at Brackley Town until 30 June 2027)
43	MF	ENG	David Hicks (on loan at Bedford Town until January 2027)
44	MF	ENG	Tyler Sackey (on loan at Aldershot Town until January 2027)
45	MF	ENG	Kiyan Coke-Miles-Smith (on loan at Chippenham Town until December 2026)

No.	Pos.	Nation	Player
46	DF	SLE	Abraham Kanu (on loan at Wealdstone until December 2026)
47	MF	ENG	Shay Spencer (on loan at Slough Town until Mid October 2026)
49	MF	ENG	Emmanuel Osho (on loan at AFC Totton until January 2027)
55	FW	ZIM	Reece Evans (on loan at Bedford Town until January 2027)

== Under-18 team ==
Each year, following the completion of their full-time education, the club signs a number of schoolboys, from both within the academy and from other clubs, on scholarship agreements. The scholarships last two years after which the player signs professionally or is released by the club. In instances where a player is particularly valued, the club may opt to sign them on professional terms at an earlier age. The scholars make up the bulk of the Academy team which competes in the under-18 league, though younger players are also eligible. As well as the league, the Academy also enters a team into the FA Youth Cup.

The under-18s play their home matches at Bearwood Park, the club's training ground, with a selection of games each season being played at the Madejski Stadium. Three outfield players and one goalkeeper over the age of 18 are allowed to be selected for each fixture, with scholars from the Academy squad also eligible to play.

=== Current Under-18s squad ===
As of 23 September 2026

Note: Flags indicate national team as defined under FIFA eligibility rules; some limited exceptions apply. Players may hold more than one non-FIFA nationality.

No.	Pos.	Nation	Player
51	GK	ENG	Josh Welland
52	FW	ENG	Dennis Bossman
53	DF	ENG	Harley Irish
56	MF	CAN	George Booth
57	DF	ENG	Callum Cliff
58	GK	NZL	Tobias Borgnis
59	DF	ENG	Anthony Dove
61	DF	ENG	Jacob Neptune
62	MF	ENG	Ainsley Covus
—	GK	ENG	Josh Yensu
—	DF	ENG	Christian Cary
—	DF	ENG	Ethan Heywood

No.	Pos.	Nation	Player
—	DF	ENG	Da'Jarn Martin-Grant
—	DF	ENG	Ryan Zie
—	MF	ENG	Henry Agyekum
—	MF	ENG	Ryan Beacroft
—	MF	ZAM	Lucas Daka
—	MF	ENG	Elijah Gayle
—	MF	ENG	Aaron Nour
—	MF	ENG	Matthias Ojo
—	MF	ENG	Lewis Otis
—	MF	LCA	Kai Russell
—	MF	ENG	Omari Zion
—	FW	ENG	Kallum Fuller-Thompson

== Staff ==
- Academy manager: Michael Gilkes
- U21 Manager: Peter Scott
- U21 Goalkeeper Coach: Vacant
- U18 Manager: Harrison Gilkes
- U18 Coach: Michael Donaldson
- Head of Academy Physiotherapy: Steve Cottrell
- Lead Academy Doctor: Dr Marc Batista
- U21 Academy Doctor: Manish Thakker
- U18 Physiotherapist: Matt Flynn
- U21 Physiotherapist: Cian Dunne
- U9-16 Physiotherapist: Pippa Inwood
- U9-16 Physiotherapist: Alex Meredith
- U21 Sport Scientist: Harry Bruford
- U18 Sport Scientist: Luca Avena
- PDP Strength and Conditioning Coach: David Breakspear
- U9-16 Sport Scientist: Callum Stratford
- Lead Academy and U21 Analyst: Andy Chenery
- U18 Performance Analyst: Joe Cole
- U9-16 Performance Analyst: Matt Burdekin
- Academy Performance Coach: Ben Marks

== Former players ==
=== Graduates ===
Prior to the establishment of the Academy, Reading produced several players for the first-team who went on to have successful careers. Neil Webb became Reading's youngest ever goalscorer aged 17 years and 31 days and made a total of 81 appearances for the club, later going on to win 26 England caps. Ady Williams made nearly 400 appearances in three spells between 1988 and 2004 and was capped 13 times for Wales whilst Stuart Lovell made 227 league appearances, scored 58 times and played twice for the Australia national team. Others to have come through the ranks include Johnny Brooks, Jerry Williams, Steve Hetzke, Scott Taylor and Maurice Evans, who made over 400 league appearances for Reading and later managed the first-team between 1977 and 1984.

Since the Academy opened in 1999, 94 graduates have gone on to play for the first team. Players are numbered based on their official graduate number. Players who have gone on to play for their country at full international level are marked in bold whilst those still at the club are marked in italics.

1. (England) Alex Haddow
2. (England) Darius Henderson
3. (England) Nathan Tyson
4. (England) Jamie Ashdown
5. (Scotland) Darren Campbell
6. (England) Peter Castle
7. (England) Jamie Young
8. (Republic of Ireland) **Simon Cox**
9. (Republic of Ireland) **Shane Long**
10. (Kenya) Curtis Osano
11. (Republic of Ireland) **Alex Pearce**
12. (England) James Henry
13. (England) Julian Kelly
14. (Iceland) **Gylfi Sigurðsson**
15. (Turkey) Jem Karacan
16. (Wales) **Simon Church**
17. (Wales) **Hal Robson-Kanu**
18. (Republic of Ireland) Scott Davies
19. (England) Nicholas Bignall
20. (England) Ben Hamer
21. (Uganda) Jordan Obita
22. (Wales) **Jake Taylor**
23. (England) **Alex McCarthy**
24. (England) Lawson D'Ath
25. (England) Dominic Samuel
26. (Jamaica) **Michael Hector**
27. (Australia) Ryan Edwards
28. (England) Craig Tanner
29. (England) Jake Cooper
30. (England) Jack Stacey
31. (England) Aaron Kuhl
32. (Democratic Republic of the Congo) **Aaron Tshibola**
33. (Republic of Ireland) Sean Long
34. (Denmark) Mikkel Andersen
35. (Republic of Ireland) Niall Keown
36. (United States) **Andrija Novakovich**
37. (Ghana) **Tariqe Fosu**
38. (Republic of Ireland) Josh Barrett
39. (England) Robert Dickie
40. (England) Tennai Watson
41. (Republic of Ireland) Liam Kelly
42. (England) Omar Richards
43. (England) Sam Smith
44. (Zimbabwe) **Andy Rinomhota**
45. (Iceland) **Axel Óskar Andrésson**
46. (Cameroon) **Danny Loader**
47. (England) Tom Holmes
48. (Scotland) Tom McIntyre
49. (Nigeria) **Gabriel Osho**
50. (England) Ryan East
51. (France) **Michael Olise**
52. (England) Teddy Howe
53. (England) Akin Odimayo
54. (Saint Kitts and Nevis) **Andre Burley**
55. (England) Ramarni Medford-Smith
56. (Montserrat) **Jeriel Dorsett**
57. (Scotland) Ben House
58. (Northern Ireland) **Luke Southwood**
59. (Saint Kitts and Nevis) **Ethan Bristow**
60. (Saint Lucia) **Nahum Melvin-Lambert**
61. (Serbia) Dejan Tetek
62. (England) Lynford Sackey
63. (England) Nelson Abbey
64. (England) Oliver Pendlebury
65. (England) Conor Lawless
66. (Guinea-Bissau) **Mamadi Camará**
67. (Nigeria) Kelvin Ehibhatiomhan
68. (Republic of Ireland) Kian Leavy
69. (Timor-Leste) **Claudio Osorio**
70. (England) Michael Stickland
71. (Jamaica) Jahmari Clarke
72. (England) Tyrell Ashcroft
73. (England) Louie Holzman
74. (Ghana) Kelvin Abrefa
75. (Malta) **Basil Tuma**
76. (Jamaica) **Coniah Boyce-Clarke**
77. (Belgium) Jack Senga
78. (England) Caylan Vickers
79. (England) Taylan Harris
80. (England) Tom Norcott
81. (England) Andre Garcia
82. (England) Emmanuel Osho
83. (Sierra Leone) Abraham Kanu
84. (England) Tyler Sackey
85. (England) Ashqar Ahmed
86. (England) Shay Spencer
87. (England) Joseph Barough
88. (England) Boyd Beacroft
89. (England) Jeremiah Okine-Peters
90. (New Zealand) Jacob Borgnis
91. (Ghana) Philip Duah
92. (England) Luke Howard
93. (England) Jerae Jones
94. (England) Scofield Lonmeni-Dekam

==== Statistics ====
As of match played 14 November 2026

Academy graduates Reading F.C. and international careers
#	Player	Position	Age of debut	Reading					International			U21/U23 International			World Cups
#	Player	Position	Age of debut	Reading Career	Manager	Debut date	Apps	Goals	Country	Apps	Goals	Country	Apps	Goals	Year
1	(England) Alex Haddow	Midfielder	17 years, 228 days	1999–2001	Tommy Burns	24 August 1999	4	0	–			–			–
2	(England) Darius Henderson	Forward	18 years, 193 days	1999–2004	Alan Pardew	18 March 2000	83	15	–			–			–
3	(England) Nathan Tyson	Forward	17 years, 361 days	1999–2004	Alan Pardew	29 April 2000	38	1	–			–			–
4	(England) Jamie Ashdown	Goalkeeper	19 years, 287 days	1998–2004	Alan Pardew	12 September 2000	16	0	–			–			–
5	(Scotland) Darren Campbell	Midfielder	17 years, 14 days	2003–2005	Alan Pardew	30 April 2003	1	0	–			–			–
6	(England) Peter Castle	Defender	16 years, 49 days	2003–2006	Alan Pardew	30 April 2003	1	0	–			–			–
7	(England) Jamie Young	Goalkeeper	18 years, 201 days	2003–2006	Steve Coppell	13 March 2004	1	0	–			–			–
8	(Republic of Ireland) Simon Cox	Forward	18 years, 145 days	2005–2008; 2014–2016	Steve Coppell	20 September 2005	69	9	Republic of Ireland	30	4	–			–
9	(Republic of Ireland) **Shane Long**	Forward	18 years, 340 days	2005–2011; 2022–2023	Steve Coppell	28 December 2005	235	56	Republic of Ireland	88	17	Republic of Ireland	1	0	–
10	(Kenya) Curtis Osano	Defender	18 years, 315 days	2005–2008	Steve Coppell	17 January 2006	2	0	–			–			–
11	(Republic of Ireland) **Alex Pearce**	Defender	18 years, 61 days	2006–2015	Steve Coppell	9 January 2007	240	15	Republic of Ireland	7	2	Scotland	2	0	–
12	(England) James Henry	Midfielder	18 years, 107 days	2006–2010	Steve Coppell	25 September 2007	18	4	–			–			–
13	(England) Julian Kelly	Defender	18 years, 341 days	2008–2011	Steve Coppell	12 August 2008	13	0	–			–			–
14	(Iceland) **Gylfi Sigurðsson**	Midfielder	18 years, 353 days	2008–2010	Steve Coppell	26 August 2008	51	22	Iceland	85	28	Iceland	14	6	2018
15	(Turkey) Jem Karacan	Midfielder	19 years, 187 days	2007–2015	Steve Coppell	26 August 2008	175	12	–			Turkey	3	0	–
16	(Wales) **Simon Church**	Forward	20 years, 153 days	2007–2013	Steve Coppell	12 May 2009	122	24	Wales	38	3	Wales	15	8	–
17	(Wales) **Hal Robson-Kanu**	Midfielder	20 years, 79 days	2007–2016	Brendan Rodgers	8 August 2009	228	30	Wales	46	5	Wales	4	2	–
18	(Republic of Ireland) Scott Davies	Midfielder	21 years, 151 days	2006–2011	Brendan Rodgers	8 August 2009	5	0	–			Republic of Ireland	3	0	–
19	(England) Nicholas Bignall	Forward	19 years, 31 days	2008–2013	Brendan Rodgers	11 August 2009	4	2	–			–			–
20	(England) Ben Hamer	Goalkeeper	21 years, 264 days	2006–2011	Brendan Rodgers	11 August 2009	5	0	–			–			–
21	(Uganda) Jordan Obita	Defender	16 years, 246 days	2010–2020	Brian McDermott	11 August 2010	191	7	Uganda	10	0	–			–
22	(Wales) **Jake Taylor**	Midfielder	18 years, 266 days	2009–2016	Brian McDermott	24 August 2010	36	3	Wales	1	0	Wales	10	0	–
23	(England) **Alex McCarthy**	Goalkeeper	21 years, 78 days	2007–2014	Brian McDermott	19 February 2011	75	0	England	1	0	England	3	0	–
24	(England) Lawson D'Ath	Midfielder	19 years, 14 days	2010–2014	Brian McDermott	7 January 2012	1	0	–			–			–
25	(England) Dominic Samuel	Forward	18 years, 254 days	2012–2017	Brian McDermott	11 December 2012	15	2	–			–			–
26	(Jamaica) **Michael Hector**	Defender	21 years, 183 days	2009–2015; 2015-16	Nigel Adkins	18 January 2014	93	5	Jamaica	45	0	–			–
27	(Australia) Ryan Edwards	Midfielder	20 years, 265 days	2012–2015	Nigel Adkins	9 August 2014	10	0	–			Australia	18	0	–
28	(England) Craig Tanner	Forward	19 years, 289 days	2013–2017	Nigel Adkins	12 August 2014	5	1	–			–			–
29	(England) Jake Cooper	Defender	19 years, 194 days	2014–2017	Nigel Adkins	16 August 2014	56	4	–			–			–
30	(England) Jack Stacey	Midfielder	18 years, 132 days	2013–2017	Nigel Adkins	16 August 2014	6	0	–			–			–
31	(England) Aaron Kuhl	Midfielder	18 years, 201 days	2013–2017	Nigel Adkins	19 August 2014	8	0	–			–			–
32	(Democratic Republic of the Congo) **Aaron Tshibola**	Midfielder	19 years, 233 days	2013–2016	Nigel Adkins	23 August 2014	17	0	DR Congo	19	1	–			2026
33	(Republic of Ireland) Sean Long	Defender	19 years, 116 days	2013–2017	Nigel Adkins	26 August 2014	1	0	–			Republic of Ireland	11	1	–
34	(Denmark) Mikkel Andersen	Goalkeeper	25 years, 277 days	2007–2015	Nigel Adkins	20 September 2014	5	0	–			Denmark	14	0	–
35	(Republic of Ireland) Niall Keown	Defender	19 years, 339 days	2013–2017	Steve Clarke	10 March 2015	3	0	–			Republic of Ireland	2	0	–
36	(United States) **Andrija Novakovich**	Forward	18 years, 171 days	2015–2019	Steve Clarke	14 March 2015	3	0	United States	3	0	–			–
37	(Ghana) **Tariqe Fosu**	Midfielder	19 years, 178 days	2014–2017	Steve Clarke	2 May 2015	1	0	Ghana	4	1	-			–
38	(Republic of Ireland) Josh Barrett	Midfielder	17 years, 261 days	2015–2020	Brian McDermott	8 March 2016	13	2	–			Republic of Ireland	3	0	–
39	(England) Robert Dickie	Defender	20 years, 65 days	2014–2018	Brian McDermott	7 May 2016	1	0	–			–			–
40	(England) Tennai Watson	Defender	19 years, 155 days	2015–2021	Jaap Stam	6 August 2016	9	0	–			–			–
41	(Republic of Ireland) Liam Kelly	Midfielder	20 years, 275 days	2013–2019	Jaap Stam	23 August 2016	94	9	–			Republic of Ireland	1	0	–
42	(England) Omar Richards	Defender	19 years, 171 days	2016–2021	Jaap Stam	5 August 2017	104	3	–			England	1	0	–
43	(England) Sam Smith	Forward	19 years, 153 days	2015–2021; 2023–2025	Jaap Stam	8 August 2017	74	29	–			–			–
44	(Zimbabwe) **Andy Rinomhota**	Midfielder	20 years, 109 days	2015–2022; 2025-	Jaap Stam	8 August 2017	157	4	Zimbabwe	17	0	–			–
45	(Iceland) **Axel Óskar Andrésson**	Defender	19 years, 193 days	2016–2019	Jaap Stam	8 August 2017	2	0	Iceland	2	0	Iceland	18	3	–
46	(Cameroon) **Danny Loader**	Forward	16 years, 359 days	2017–2020	Jaap Stam	22 August 2017	35	2	Cameroon	15	1	England	9	1	–
47	(England) Tom Holmes	Defender	17 years, 359 days	2017–2024; 2024	Jaap Stam	6 March 2018	133	1	–			–			–
48	(Scotland) Tom McIntyre	Defender	20 years, 39 days	2016–2024	Scott Marshall	15 December 2018	117	7	–			Scotland	3	0	–
49	(Nigeria) **Gabriel Osho**	Defender	20 years, 130 days	2016–2020	Scott Marshall	22 December 2018	10	0	Nigeria	2	0	–			–
50	(England) Ryan East	Midfielder	20 years, 217 days	2016–2021	José Gomes	12 March 2019	1	0	–			–			–
51	(France) **Michael Olise**	Midfielder	17 years, 90 days	2019–2021	José Gomes	12 March 2019	73	7	France	31	12	France	7	1	2026
52	(England) Teddy Howe	Defender	20 years, 208 days	2017–2020	José Gomes	5 May 2019	6	0	–			–			–
53	(England) Akin Odimayo	Defender	19 years, 272 days	2019–2020	José Gomes	27 August 2019	1	0	–			–			–
54	(Saint Kitts and Nevis) **Andre Burley**	Defender	20 years, 116 days	2019–2020	Mark Bowen	4 January 2020	3	0	Saint Kitts and Nevis	28	2	–			–
55	(England) Ramarni Medford-Smith	Defender	21 years, 75 days	2019–2020	Mark Bowen	4 January 2020	1	0	–			–			–
56	(Montserrat) **Jeriel Dorsett**	Defender	17 years, 255 days	2019–	Mark Bowen	14 January 2020	99	3	Montserrat	11	0	–			–
57	(Scotland) Ben House	Forward	20 years, 204 days	2019–2020	Mark Bowen	25 January 2020	1	0	–			Scotland	2	0	–
58	(Northern Ireland) **Luke Southwood**	Goalkeeper	22 years, 274 days	2020–2023	Eddie Niedzwiecki	5 September 2020	30	0	Northern Ireland	2	0	–			–
59	(Saint Kitts and Nevis) **Ethan Bristow**	Defender	18 years, 283 days	2020–2022	Eddie Niedzwiecki	5 September 2020	11	0	Saint Kitts and Nevis	5	1	–			–
60	(Saint Lucia) **Nahum Melvin-Lambert**	Forward	18 years, 283 days	2020–2023	Eddie Niedzwiecki	5 September 2020	3	0	Saint Lucia	1	0	–			–
61	(Serbia) Dejan Tetek	Midfielder	17 years, 357 days	2020–2023	Veljko Paunović	15 September 2020	21	0	–			Serbia	5	0	–
62	(England) Lynford Sackey	Forward	17 years, 210 days	2020–2022	Veljko Paunović	15 September 2020	2	0	–			–			–
63	(England) Nelson Abbey	Defender	17 years, 18 days	2020–2024	Veljko Paunović	15 September 2020	31	0	–			–			–
64	(England) Oliver Pendlebury	Midfielder	18 years, 356 days	2020–2021	Veljko Paunović	9 January 2021	1	0	–			–			–
65	(England) Conor Lawless	Midfielder	19 years, 118 days	2020–2021	Veljko Paunović	9 January 2021	1	0	–			–			–
66	(Guinea-Bissau) **Mamadi Camará**	Midfielder	17 years, 9 days	2020–2026	Veljko Paunović	9 January 2021	75	7	Guinea-Bissau	11	0	–			–
67	(Nigeria) Kelvin Ehibhatiomhan	Forward	19 years, 109 days	2021–2026	Veljko Paunović	10 August 2021	139	27	–			–			–
68	(Republic of Ireland) Kian Leavy	Midfielder	19 years, 142 days	2021–2023	Veljko Paunović	10 August 2021	2	0	Republic of Ireland	1	0	Republic of Ireland	2	0	–
69	(Timor-Leste) **Claudio Osorio**	Midfielder	18 years, 318 days	2021–2023	Veljko Paunović	10 August 2021	2	0	Timor-Leste	22	1	–			–
70	(England) Michael Stickland	Defender	18 years, 351 days	2021–2026	Veljko Paunović	10 August 2021	21	0	–			–			–
71	(Jamaica) **Jahmari Clarke**	Forward	17 years, 358 days	2021–2024	Veljko Paunović	10 August 2021	14	2	–			–			–
72	(England) Tyrell Ashcroft	Defender	19 years, 240 days	2021–2022	Marko Mitrović	2 November 2021	4	0	–			–			–
73	(England) Louie Holzman	Defender	18 years, 53 days	2021–2025	Veljko Paunović	8 January 2022	17	0	–			–			–
74	(Ghana) Kelvin Abrefa	Defender	18 years, 65 days	2021–	Veljko Paunović	12 February 2022	83	2	–			–			–
75	(Malta) **Basil Tuma**	Forward	17 years, 107 days	2022–2026	Paul Ince	9 August 2022	15	0	Malta	11	1	Malta	9	0	–
76	(Jamaica) **Coniah Boyce-Clarke**	Forward	20 years, 68 days	2019–2025	Noel Hunt	8 May 2023	7	0	Jamaica	3	0	–			–
77	(Belgium) Jack Senga	Midfielder	19 years, 101 days	2021–2025	Noel Hunt	8 May 2023	5	0	–			–			–
78	(England) Caylan Vickers	Forward	18 years, 226 days	2023–2024	Rubén Sellés	5 August 2023	22	3	–			–			–
79	(England) Taylan Harris	Midfielder	17 years, 324 days	2023–2024	Rubén Sellés	19 September 2023	1	1	–			–			–
80	(England) Tom Norcott	Goalkeeper	18 years, 280 days	2023–	Rubén Sellés	10 October 2023	2	0	–			–			–
81	(England) Andre Garcia	Defender	16 years, 254 days	2024–	Rubén Sellés	10 August 2024	56	2	–			–			–
82	(England) Emmanuel Osho	Defender	17 years, 322 days	2024–	Rubén Sellés	13 August 2024	12	0	–			–			–
83	(Sierra Leone) Abraham Kanu	Defender	19 years, 41 days	2024–	Rubén Sellés	13 August 2024	16	0	–			Sierra Leone	2	0	–
84	(England) Tyler Sackey	Midfielder	17 years, 353 days	2024–	Rubén Sellés	20 August 2024	9	2	–			–			–
85	(England) Ashqar Ahmed	Defender	16 years, 355 days	2024–	Rubén Sellés	20 August 2024	30	0	–			–			–
86	(England) Shay Spencer	Midfielder	18 years, 312 days	2024–	Rubén Sellés	20 August 2024	9	0	–			–			–
87	(England) Joseph Barough	Midfielder	18 years, 216 days	2024–	Rubén Sellés	5 November 2024	3	0	–			–			–
88	(England) Boyd Beacroft	Defender	18 years, 349 days	2024–	Rubén Sellés	5 November 2024	5	0	–			–			–
89	(England) Jeremiah Okine-Peters	Forward	19 years, 325 days	2024–2026	Rubén Sellés	5 November 2024	5	1	–			–			–
90	(New Zealand) Jacob Borgnis	Midfielder	20 years, 361 days	2025–2026	Noel Hunt	2 September 2025	3	1	–			–			–
91	(Ghana) Philip Duah	Defender	18 years, 321 days	2024–	Noel Hunt	30 September 2025	4	0	–			–			–
92	(England) Luke Howard	Midfielder	18 years, 300 days	2025–	Leam Richardson	2 May 2026	4	0	–			–			–
93	(England) Jerae Jones	Forward	19 years, 89 days	2026–	Leam Richardson	19 August 2026	4	1	–			–			–
94	(England) Scofield Lonmeni-Dekam	Midfielder	18 years, 287 days	2026–	Leam Richardson	10 November 2026	1	0	–			–			–
Totals						94 Players	3,443	327	28 Players	537	79	25 Players	162	22	3

=== Careers elsewhere ===
A number of players attached to the Academy as schoolboys and scholars, as well as those who signed professionally but never made a first team appearance, have gone on play league football elsewhere. Those that have gone on to play for their country at full international level are marked in bold and those who made their league debut whilst away on loan are marked in Italics.

- (Iceland) **Jökull Andrésson**
- (England) Nick Arnold
- (England) Charlie Austin
- (Grenada) **Shandon Baptiste**
- (England) Marvin Bartley
- (Sierra Leone) **Abdulai Bell-Baggie**
- (Sweden) Doug Bergqvist
- (England) Jayden Bogle
- (Ghana) Kelvin Bossman
- (Trinidad and Tobago) **Andre Boucaud**
- (Australia) **Oliver Bozanic**
- (Norway) Henrik Breimyr
- (England) Josh Brooking
- (England) Jamie Bynoe-Gittens
- (England) Des Buckingham
- (Scotland) Harry Cardwell
- (England) Travis Clayton (Note: Clayton was a 7th round pick for the Buffalo Bills during the 2024 NFL draft.)
- (Trinidad and Tobago) **Daniel Carr**
- (England) Ethan Coleman
- (England) Harry Cooksley
- (Montserrat) **Donervon Daniels**
- (Austria) **Kevin Danso**
- (Australia) Cameron Edwards
- (England) Diamond Edwards
- (England) Princewill Ehibhatiomhan
- (Iceland) **Samúel Friðjónsson**
- (Sierra Leone) **Tyrese Fornah**
- (England) Tyler Frost
- (England) Ben Gladwin
- (England) John Goddard
- (England) Tyler Goodrham
- (Republic of Ireland) Shane Griffin
- (Russia) Nikita Haikin
- (England) Tom Hateley
- (Scotland) Jordan Holsgrove
- (Republic of Ireland) **Jonny Hayes**
- (England) Bashir Humphreys
- (Afghanistan) **Noor Husin**
- (Scotland) **Dominic Hyam**
- (England) Uche Ikpeazu
- (South Korea) **Ji Dong-Won**
- (Scotland) Zak Jules
- (Cameroon) Clovis Kamdjo
- (Belgium) Ibrahim Kargbo Jr.
- (South Korea) Kim Won-sik
- (England) George Legg
- (England) Adam Liddle
- (England) Dan Lincoln (Note: Lincoln made his First-class cricket debut in 2021 Kent.)
- (England) Adam Lockwood
- (England) Angus MacDonald
- (England) Jay Matete
- (England) Alfie Mawson
- (Republic of Ireland) Carl McHugh
- (England) Adam Mekki
- (England) Stuart Moore
- (England) Johnny Mullins
- (South Korea) **Nam Tae-Hee**
- (Tanzania) Roberto Nditi
- (England) Thierry Nevers
- (England) Jack Nolan
- (England) Hakeem Odoffin
- (England) Jordi Osei-Tutu
- (England) Matt Partridge
- (England) Frankie Raymond
- (England) Scott Rendell
- (England) Myles Roberts
- (Australia) Joel Rollinson
- (England) James Rowe
- (England) Imari Samuels
- (England) Steve Seddon
- (Republic of Ireland) Conor Shaughnessy
- (England) Chris Smith
- (Barbados) **Louie Soares**
- (England) Fabio Sole
- (England) Jack Stevens
- (England) Matty Stevens
- (Republic of Ireland) Pierce Sweeney
- (England) Rhys Tyler
- (England) Gozie Ugwu
- (Guyana) **Terence Vancooten**
- (Bulgaria) **Radoslav Vasilev**
- (Estonia) **Bogdan Vaštšuk**
- (England) Lewis Ward
- (England) Connor Wickham
- (England) Andy White

== Records and honours ==
Several Academy graduates hold club records. Peter Castle became the club's youngest ever player when he came on as a substitute against Watford on 30 April 2003 for his first and only Reading appearance, aged 16 years and 49 days, whilst Gylfi Sigurðsson holds the record for the highest transfer fee received when he moved to Hoffenheim in August 2010. In May 2013 Alex McCarthy became the first Reading graduate to be selected in the England squad since the Academy era began in 1999. Additionally, three graduates have been named Player of the Season with Gylfi Sigurðsson, Alex Pearce and Jordan Obita winning in 2009–10, 2011–12 and 2013–14 respectively.

The Football Combination
Winners: 2003–04, 2008–09
Runners-up: 2005–06
Premier Reserve League
Winners: 2006–07
Under-21 Premier League Cup
Winners: 2013–14
Under-18 Professional Development League 1
Runners-up: 2012–13

=== European ===
As of match played 21 January 2025

Competition	Pld	W	D	L	GF	GA	GD
Premier League International Cup	15	4	3	8	19	25	–6
Total	14	4	2	8	18	24	-6

Season	Competition	Round	Club	Home	Away	Aggregate
2016–17	Premier League International Cup	Group F	(England) Everton	—N/a	1–2	4th
2016–17	Premier League International Cup	Group F	(Spain) Athletic Bilbao	2–3	—N/a	4th
2016–17	Premier League International Cup	Group F	(Germany) Hertha BSC	0–2	—N/a	4th
2017–18	Premier League International Cup	Group E	(Portugal) FC Porto	0–2	—N/a	4th
2017–18	Premier League International Cup	Group E	(England) Arsenal	—N/a	0–0	4th
2017–18	Premier League International Cup	Group E	(Germany) Bayern Munich	0–1	—N/a	4th
2018–19	Premier League International Cup	Group B	(England) Leicester City	—N/a	2–0	1st
2018–19	Premier League International Cup	Group B	(Czech Republic) Sparta Prague	2–2	—N/a	1st
2018–19	Premier League International Cup	Group B	(Netherlands) Feyenoord	2–0	—N/a	1st
2018–19	Premier League International Cup	Quarter-final	(England) Manchester United	—N/a	3–1	—N/a
2018–19	Premier League International Cup	Semi-final	(Germany) Bayern Munich	1–3	—N/a	—N/a
2024–25	Premier League International Cup	Group A	(Netherlands) Ajax	2–1	—N/a	4th
2024–25	Premier League International Cup	Group A	(France) AS Monaco	1–4	—N/a	4th
2024–25	Premier League International Cup	Group A	(Croatia) Dinamo Zagreb	2–3	—N/a	4th
2024–25	Premier League International Cup	Group A	(Spain) Valencia	1–1	—N/a	4th

==== Appearances ====
As of match played 21 January 2025

	Name	Years	Premier League International Cup	Total	Ratio
1	(Republic of Ireland) Josh Barrett	2015–2020	11 (0)	11 (0)	0
2	(England) Ryan East	2008–2019	8 (0)	8 (0)	0
3	(England) Danny Loader (Note: Loader was born in England, changed his professional name to Danny Namaso in 2022, and went on to represent Cameroon in 2025, both after leaving Reading.)	2013–2017	7 (5)	7 (5)	0.71
4	(England) Omar Richards	2013–2021	6 (0)	6 (0)	0
4	(England) Ramarni Medford-Smith	2017–2020	6 (0)	6 (0)	0
4	(England) Tyler Frost	2014–2020	6 (1)	6 (1)	0.17
7	(England) Tom Holmes	2008–2024	5 (0)	5 (0)	0
7	(Scotland) Ben House (Note: House was born in England, but qualified to represent Scotland, representing them at U21 in 2019.)	2016–2020	5 (2)	5 (2)	0.4
9	(Scotland) Jake Sheppard (Note: Sheppard was born in England, but qualified to represent Scotland, representing them at U21 in 2016.)	2015–2018	4 (0)	4 (0)	0
9	(Scotland) Tom McIntyre (Note: McIntyre was born in England, but qualified to represent Scotland, representing them at U21 in 2018.)	2008–2024	4 (0)	4 (0)	0
9	(England) Gabriel Osho (Note: Osho was born in England, but went on to represent Nigeria in 2024 after leaving Reading.)	2008–2020	4 (0)	4 (0)	0
9	(Scotland) Jordan Holsgrove	2017–2019	4 (0)	4 (0)	0
9	(France) Michael Olise (Note: Olise was born in England, but qualified to represent France, representing them at various Youth and Senior level.)	2017–2021	4 (0)	4 (0)	0
9	(England) Boyd Beacroft	2021–Present	4 (0)	4 (0)	0
9	(England) Emmanuel Osho	2024–Present	4 (0)	4 (0)	0
9	(Belgium) Jack Senga	2020–2025	4 (0)	4 (0)	0
9	(England) Tyler Sackey	2024–Present	4 (2)	4 (2)	0.5
9	(England) Joseph Barough	2023–Present	4 (0)	4 (0)	0
19	(United States) Andrija Novakovich	2014–2019	3 (0)	3 (0)	0
19	(England) Andy Rinomhota (Note: Rinomhota was born in England, but went on to represent Zimbabwe in 2023 after leaving Reading.)	2015–2022	3 (0)	3 (0)	0
19	(England) Luke Southwood (Note: Southwood was born in England, representing them at U20 level before going on to represent Northern Ireland in 2021.)	2015–2023	3 (0)	3 (0)	0
19	(England) George Legg	2013–2019	3 (0)	3 (0)	0
19	(England) Andre Burley (Note: Burley was born in England, but went on to represent Saint Kitts and Nevis in 2021 after leaving Reading.)	2018–2020	3 (0)	3 (0)	0
19	(England) Teddy Howe	2008–2020	3 (0)	3 (0)	0
19	(England) Michael Stickland	2021–2026	3 (1)	3 (1)	0.33
19	(England) Charlie Wellens	2023–2025	3 (0)	3 (0)	0
19	(New Zealand) Jacob Borgnis	2021–2026	3 (0)	3 (0)	0
28	(Scotland) Zak Jules	2015–2017	2 (0)	2 (0)	0
28	(Netherlands) Danzell Gravenberch	2016–2019	2 (0)	2 (0)	0
28	(Scotland) Dominic Hyam	2013–2017	2 (0)	2 (0)	0
28	(England) Aaron Kuhl	2013–2017	2 (0)	2 (0)	0
28	(Iceland) Axel Óskar Andrésson	2014–2018	2 (0)	2 (0)	0
28	(England) Sam Smith	2014–2021, 2013–2025	2 (0)	2 (0)	0
28	(England) Tennai Watson	2015–2021	2 (0)	2 (0)	0
28	(Australia) Joel Rollinson	2016–2019	2 (0)	2 (0)	0
28	(England) Jack Nolan	2019–2020	2 (0)	2 (0)	0
28	(England) Jamal Balogun	2016–2019	2 (0)	2 (0)	0
28	(Jamaica) Coniah Boyce-Clarke (Note: Boyce-Clarke was born in England, but qualified to represent Jamaica, representing them at various youth levels since 2010.)	2020–2025	4 (0)	4 (0)	0
28	(England) Ethan Coleman	??–2020	2 (1)	2 (1)	0.5
28	(England) Tom Norcott	2021–Present	2 (0)	2 (0)	0
28	(England) Louie Holzman	2020–2025	2 (0)	2 (0)	0
28	(England) Kai Source	2024–2025	2 (0)	2 (0)	0
28	(England) Sam Harrison	2024–Present	2 (0)	2 (0)	0
28	(England) Jayden Wareham	2023–2025	2 (1)	2 (1)	0.5
28	(England) Jeremiah Okine-Peters	2021–2026	2 (1)	2 (1)	0.5
28	(England) Shay Spencer	2024–Present	2 (0)	2 (0)	0
47	(England) Jonathan Bond	2015–2018	1 (0)	1 (0)	0
47	(England) Jack Stacey	2013–2017	1 (0)	1 (0)	0
47	(Republic of Ireland) Liam Kelly	2013–2019	1 (0)	1 (0)	0
47	(England) Tariqe Fosu (Note: Fosu was born in England, representing them at U18 level before going on to represent Ghana in 2020.)	2014–2017	1 (1)	1 (1)	1
47	(Scotland) Harry Cardwell	2013–2017	1 (0)	1 (0)	0
47	(England) Jake Cooper	2014–2017	1 (0)	1 (0)	0
47	(Republic of Ireland) Niall Keown	2013–2017	1 (0)	1 (0)	0
47	(Liechtenstein) Sandro Wieser	2016–2018	1 (0)	1 (0)	0
47	(Ivory Coast) Yakou Méïté (Note: Méïté was born in France, but qualified to represent Ivory Coast, representing them at Youth and Senior level.)	2016–2013	1 (2)	1 (2)	2
47	(France) Joseph Mendes (Note: Mendes was born in France, but went on to represent Guinea-Bissau in 2019 after leaving Reading.)	2016–2018	1 (0)	1 (0)	0
47	(England) Harrison Bennett	2014–2017	1 (0)	1 (0)	0
47	(Guyana) Terence Vancooten (Note: Vancooten was born in England, but went on to represent Zimbabwe in 2017 after leaving Reading.)	2016–2017	1 (0)	1 (0)	0
47	(Finland) Anssi Jaakkola	2016–2019	1 (0)	1 (0)	0
47	(Portugal) Tiago Ilori (Note: Ilori was born in England, but qualified to represent Portugal, representing them at various youth levels since 2010.)	2017–2019	1 (0)	1 (0)	0
47	(England) Tyler Blackett	2016–2020	1 (0)	1 (0)	0
47	(Romania) Adrian Popa	2017–2020	1 (0)	1 (0)	0
47	(Netherlands) Pelle Clement	2017–2019	1 (0)	1 (0)	0
47	(Netherlands) Darren Sidoel	2018–2019	2 (0)	2 (0)	0
47	(Italy) Vito Mannone	2017–2020	1 (0)	1 (0)	0
47	(England) Akin Odimayo	2019–2020	1 (0)	1 (0)	0
47	(Wales) David Edwards (Note: Edwards was born in England, but qualified to represent Wales, representing them at U-21 and Senior level.)	2017–2019	1 (1)	1 (1)	1
47	(Republic of Ireland) David Meyler	2018–2019	1 (0)	1 (0)	0
47	(Iceland) Jón Daði Böðvarsson	2017–2019	1 (0)	1 (0)	0
47	(England) Cameron Green	2016–2019	1 (0)	1 (0)	0
47	(England) Adam Liddle	2018–2020	1 (0)	1 (0)	0
47	(England) Oliver Pendlebury	2019–2020	1 (0)	1 (0)	0
47	(England) Harlee Dean	2023–2025	1 (0)	1 (0)	0
47	(Montserrat) Jeriel Dorsett (Note: Dorsett was born in England, representing them at U18 level before going on to represent Montserrat in 2023.)	2018–Present	1 (0)	1 (0)	0
47	(Ghana) Kelvin Abrefa (Note: Abrefa was born in Italy, but qualified to represent Ghana, representing them at U20 in 2022.)	2021–Present	1 (0)	1 (0)	0
47	(Sierra Leone) Abraham Kanu	2021–Present	1 (0)	1 (0)	0
47	(Ghana) Philip Duah	2024–Present	1 (0)	1 (0)	0
47	(England) Ashqar Ahmed	2023–Present	1 (0)	1 (0)	0
47	(Zimbabwe) Tivonge Rushesha (Note: Rushesha was born in Zimbabwe, representing Wales at U17 level before going on to represent Zimbabwe.)	2023–2026	1 (0)	1 (0)	0
47	(Scotland) Michael Craig (Note: Craig was born in England, but qualified to represent Scotland, representing them at U21 in 2022.)	2022–2025	1 (0)	1 (0)	0
47	(England) Andre Garcia	2024–2026	1 (0)	1 (0)	0
47	(Grenada) T’Shay St. Louis	2024–Present	1 (0)	1 (0)	0
47	(England) Carter Bowdery	2024–Present	1 (0)	1 (0)	0
47	(England) Maddox McMillan	2024–2025	1 (0)	1 (0)	0
47	(Nigeria) Adrian Akande	2022–2025	1 (0)	1 (0)	0
47	(Malta) Basil Tuma (Note: Tuma was born in Uganda, representing them at U17 level before going on to represent Malta in 2024.)	2022–2026	1 (0)	1 (0)	0
47	(England) Kiyan Coke-Miles-Smith	2024–Present	1 (0)	1 (0)	0
47	(England) Larry Omoregie	2023–2026	1 (0)	1 (0)	0

==== Goalscorers ====
As of match played 21 January 2025

	Name	Years	Premier League International Cup	Total	Ratio
1	(England) Danny Loader	2012–2020	5 (7)	5 (7)	0.71
2	(Ivory Coast) Yakou Méïté	2016–2023	2 (1)	2 (1)	2
2	(Scotland) Ben House	2016–2020	2 (5)	2 (5)	0.4
2	(England) Tyler Sackey	2024–Present	2 (4)	2 (4)	0.5
4	(England) Tariqe Fosu	2014–2017	1 (1)	1 (1)	1
4	(England) Ethan Coleman	??–2020	1 (2)	1 (2)	0.5
4	(Wales) David Edwards	2017–2019	1 (1)	1 (1)	1
4	(England) Tyler Frost	2014–2020	1 (6)	1 (6)	0.17
4	(England) Jeremiah Okine-Peters	2024–2026	1 (2)	1 (2)	0.5
4	(England) Michael Stickland	2024–2026	1 (3)	1 (3)	0.33
4	(England) Jayden Wareham	2023–2025	1 (2)	1 (2)	0.5
4	Own goals	2016–Present	1 (15)	1 (15)	0.07
