= 2019–20 Macclesfield Town F.C. season =

Macclesfield Town F.C.
2019–20 season
- Chairman: Mark Blower
- Head Coach: Sol Campbell (until 15 August); Daryl McMahon (between 19 August–2 January); Mark Kennedy (from 16 January)
- Stadium: Moss Rose
- League Two: 24th (relegated)
- FA Cup: First round
- EFL Cup: Second round
- EFL Trophy: Group stage
- Top goalscorer: League: Joe Ironside (6); All: Joe Ironside (7)
- Highest home attendance: 3,467 vs Port Vale, League Two, 12 October 2019
- Lowest home attendance: 525 vs Newcastle United, EFL Trophy, 3 September 2019
- Average home league attendance: 1,998
Home colours	Away colours

The 2019–20 season was Macclesfield Town's second consecutive season in League Two after gaining promotion two seasons previously.

== Pre-season ==
The Silkmen announced pre-season friendlies against Congleton Town and Cheadle Heath Nomads.

9 July 2019 Friendly	Congleton Town	1–2	Macclesfield Town	Congleton
19:45 BST		Report	Blyth 1'; Trialist 87'	Stadium: Ivy Gardens

12 July 2019 Friendly	Sandbach United	6–1	Macclesfield Town	Sandbach
19:30 BST	Garner-Knapper 5', 36', 39'; Pearson 22'; Williams 75'; Knight 77'	Report	Etuong 9'	Stadium: Sandbach Football Center

22 July 2019 Friendly	Cheadle Heath Nomads	1–0	Macclesfield Town	Cheadle Heath
19:30 BST	Kirby 13'	Report		Stadium: The Heath

23 July 2019 Friendly	Leek Town	0–0	Macclesfield Town	Leek
19:45 BST		Report		Stadium: Harrison Park

27 July 2019 Friendly	Hartlepool United	3–0	Macclesfield Town	Hartlepool
15:00 BST	Featherstone 58'; Toure 69'; Raynes 81'	Report		Stadium: Super 6 Stadium

== Competitions ==
=== League Two ===
==== League table ====
Pos	Team	Pld	W	D	L	GF	GA	GD	Pts	PPG	Promotion, qualification or relegation
17	Leyton Orient	36	10	12	14	47	55	−8	42	1.17	
18	Carlisle United	37	10	12	15	39	56	−17	42	1.14	
19	Oldham Athletic	37	9	14	14	44	57	−13	41	1.11	
20	Scunthorpe United	37	10	10	17	44	56	−12	40	1.08	
21	Mansfield Town	36	9	11	16	48	55	−7	38	1.06	
22	Morecambe	37	7	11	19	35	60	−25	32	0.86	
23	Stevenage	36	3	13	20	24	50	−26	22	0.61	Reprieved from relegation (Note: As a result of Bury's expulsion from League One, only one team is relegated to maintain League Two at 24 teams.)
24	Macclesfield Town (R)	37	7	15	15	32	47	−15	19 (Note: Macclesfield Town were deducted a total of 17 points for various infractions. They were deducted six points for failing to both pay their players' wages and to fulfil a fixture, reduced to four points after appeal. A further seven-point deduction was given for failing to play December's match against Plymouth Argyle. A further two-point deduction was given for breaches of regulations over non-payment of wages. On 3 July the EFL appealed against the independent disciplinary panel's sanctions, and a further four points were deducted on 11 August 2020, resulting in Macclesfield Town being relegated.)	0.51	Relegation to the National League

Source: EFL Official Website
Rules for classification: 1) Points per game; 2) Goal difference; 3) Number of goals scored; 4) Head-to-head results; 5) Wins; 6) Away goals; 7) Penalty points (sec 9.5); 8) 12-point sending off offences
(R) Relegated

==== Results summary ====
Overall								Home						Away					
Pld	W	D	L	GF	GA	GD	Pts	W	D	L	GF	GA	GD	W	D	L	GF	GA	GD
37	7	15	15	32	47	−15	30	5	9	4	19	17	+2	2	6	11	13	30	−17

Last updated: 7 March 2020.
Source: BBC

==== Results by matchday ====
Matchday	1	2	3	4	5	6	7	8	9	10	11	12	13	14	15	16	17	18	19	20	21	22	23	24	25	26	27	28	29	30	31	32	33	34	35	36	37
Ground	A	H	A	H	H	A	H	A	H	A	H	A	H	A	A	A	H	A	H	A	H	A	A	H	H	A	H	H	A	H	A	A	H	H	A	H	A
Result	L	W	W	L	W	D	D	L	D	L	D	D	W	W	L	L	D	D	D	D	D	L	D	W	D	L	D	W	L	L	D	L	L	D	L	L	L
Position	18	8	4	10	4	7	9	13	14	15	17	16	12	9	14	15	15	14	14	15	22	22	22	22	22	22	22	22	22	22	22	23	23	22	23	23	23

Updated to match(es) played on 7 March 2020. Source: Statto.com
A = Away; H = Home; W = Win; D = Draw; L = Loss

==== Matches ====
On Thursday, 20 June 2019, the EFL League Two fixtures were revealed.

3 August 2019 1	Exeter City	1–0	Macclesfield Town	Exeter
15:00 BST	Bowman (yellow card) 70' (goal) 88'	Report	Harris (yellow card) 24'; McCourt (yellow card) 41'; Osadebe (yellow card) 70'	Stadium: St James Park; Attendance: 4,502; Referee: Sam Purkiss

10 August 2019 2	Macclesfield Town	3–0	Leyton Orient	Macclesfield
15:00 BST	Archibald 30'; Welch-Hayes (yellow card) 52'; Osadebe 68'; Vassell 83'	Report	Angol (yellow card) 49'	Stadium: Moss Rose; Attendance: 2,167; Referee: Andy Haines

17 August 2019 3	Northampton Town	1–2	Macclesfield Town	Northampton
15:00 BST	McWilliams (yellow card) 69'; Turnbull 72'	Report	Stephens 39'; Osadebe (yellow card) 74'; Archibald 90'; Evans (yellow card) 90+2'	Stadium: Sixfields Stadium; Attendance: 4,319; Referee: James Oldham

20 August 2019 4	Macclesfield Town	0–1	Morecambe	Macclesfield
19:45 BST	Welch-Hayes (yellow card) 58'; Vassell (yellow card) 82'	Report	Alessandra (yellow card) 52'; Sutton 65'; O'Sullivan (yellow card) 70'; Brewitt (yellow card) 85'	Stadium: Moss Rose; Attendance: 1,862; Referee: Paul Marsden

24 August 2019 5	Macclesfield Town	1–0	Scunthorpe United	Macclesfield
15:00 BST	Ironside 54' (pen.); Keeffe (yellow card) 56'; Welch-Hayes (yellow card) 90'	Report	Wootton (yellow card) 59'; Ntlhe (yellow card) 78'	Stadium: Moss Rose; Attendance: 1,860; Referee: James Adcock

31 August 2019 6	Stevenage	2–2	Macclesfield Town	Stevenage
15:00 BST	Byrom (yellow card) 56'; Guthrie 68'; Wildin 72'	Report	Stephens 27'; O'Keeffe (yellow card) 49'; Osadebe (yellow card) 72'; Ironside 85' (pen.)	Stadium: The Lamex Stadium; Attendance: 2,504; Referee: Scott Oldham

7 September 2019 7	Macclesfield Town	1–1	Crawley Town	Macclesfield
15:00 BST	Vassell 21'; Stephens (yellow card) 22'; Kelleher (yellow card) 50'; Harris (yellow card) 80'; Archibald (yellow card) 90+3'	Report	Doherty (yellow card) 17'; Sesay (yellow card) 34'; Lubala 73'; Bulman (yellow card) 90+3'	Stadium: Moss Rose Ground; Attendance: 1,788; Referee: Charles Breakspear

14 September 2019 8	Swindon Town	3–0	Macclesfield Town	Swindon
15:00 BST	Anderson 37'; Doyle 45+1', 76'	Report	Welch-Hayes (yellow card) 55'; O'Keeffe (yellow card) 90+4'	Stadium: The County Ground; Attendance: 7,055; Referee: Leigh Doughty

17 September 2019 9	Macclesfield Town	1–1	Newport County	Macclesfield
19:45 BST	Osadebe 19'; Gnahoua (yellow card) 40'; Archibald (yellow card) 84'	Report	Amond 1'; Labadie (yellow card) 41'; McNamara (yellow card) 58'; Haynes (yellow card) 80'; Sheehan (yellow card) 83'	Stadium: Moss Rose Ground; Attendance: 1,435; Referee: Graham Salisbury

21 September 2019 10	Grimsby Town	1–0	Macclesfield Town	Cleethorpes
15:00 BST	Robson 56'	Report		Stadium: Blundell Park; Attendance: 3,794; Referee: David Webb

28 September 2019 11	Macclesfield Town	1–1	Colchester United	Macclesfield
15:00 BST	Osadebe 13'; O'Keeffe (yellow card) 81'	Report	Nouble (yellow card) 44'; Robinson 45+1'	Stadium: Moss Rose Ground; Attendance: 1,532; Referee: Christopher Pollard

5 October 2019 12	Cambridge United	2–2	Macclesfield Town	Cambridge
15:00 BST	Roles 13'; Smith 78'; Hannant (yellow card) 90+1'	Report	Harris (yellow card) 51'; Archibald 65'; Gnahoua 68'; Vassell (yellow card) 77'; Kirby (yellow card) 90+4'	Stadium: Abbey Stadium; Attendance: 3,678; Referee: Josh Smith

12 October 2019 13	Macclesfield Town	2–1	Port Vale	Macclesfield
15:00 BST	Gnahoua 39'; Archibald (yellow card) 60'; Osadebe 64'; Vassell (yellow card) 79'	Report	Bennett 12'	Stadium: Moss Rose Ground; Attendance: 3,467; Referee: Darren Handley

19 October 2019 14	Oldham Athletic	0–1	Macclesfield Town	Oldham
15:00 BST	Maouche (yellow card) 40'; Azankpo (yellow card) 45+4'; Sylla (yellow card) 58'; McCann (yellow card) 67'	Report	Harris (yellow card) 53'; McCourt 86'	Stadium: Boundary Park; Attendance: 4,428; Referee: Anthony Backhouse

22 October 2019 15	Cheltenham Town	3–0	Macclesfield Town	Cheltenham
19:45 BST	Varney 45'; Thomas 59'; Broom 76'	Report	Archibald (yellow card) 58'	Stadium: Jonny-Rocks Stadium; Attendance: 2,632; Referee: Brett Huxtable

26 October 2019	Macclesfield Town	v	Bradford City	Macclesfield
15:00 BST		Report		Stadium: Moss Rose Ground
Note: Fixture was postponed due to a waterlogged pitch.

2 November 2019 16	Carlisle United	2–1	Macclesfield Town	Carlisle
15:00 GMT	Jones (yellow card) 30'; McKirdy 45+2'; Loft 82'; Carroll (yellow card) 86'	Report	Archibald 25'; Ironside (penalty missed) 31'; Osadebe (yellow card) 50'	Stadium: Brunton Park; Attendance: 3,880; Referee: Andy Haines

16 November 2019 17	Macclesfield Town	0–0	Mansfield Town	Macclesfield
15:00 GMT	Stephens (yellow card) 55'; Fitzpatrick (yellow card) 65'	Report	Preston (yellow card) 19'; Benning (yellow card) 21'	Stadium: Moss Rose Ground; Attendance: 2,055; Referee: Chris Sarginson

23 November 2019 18	Salford City	0–0	Macclesfield Town	Salford
15:00 GMT	Pond (yellow card) 30'; Whitehead (yellow card) 71'	Report	McCourt (yellow card) 71'; Kirby (yellow card) 89'; Evans (yellow card) 90+1'	Stadium: The Peninsula Stadium; Attendance: 2,484; Referee: Matt Donohue

30 November 2019 19	Macclesfield Town	1–1	Bradford City	Macclesfield
15:00 GMT	O'Keeffe (yellow card) 14'; McCourt 32' (pen.); Kirby (yellow card) 73' (yellow-red card) 89'; Horsfall (yellow card) 85'; Harris (yellow card) 90+1'	Report	Vaughan 73' (yellow card) 90+5'	Stadium: Moss Rose Ground; Attendance: 2,751; Referee: Scott Oldham

7 December 2019	Macclesfield Town	Fixture not fulfilled	Crewe Alexandra	Macclesfield
15:00 GMT		Report		Stadium: Moss Rose
Note: The fixture was postponed by Macclesfield without permission of the EFL on 6 December.

14 December 2019 20	Walsall	1–1	Macclesfield Town	Bescot
15:00 GMT	McDonald 74'; Gordon (yellow card) 83'	Report	Welch-Hayes 8'; Evans (yellow card) 11'; Gnahoua (yellow card) 22'	Stadium: Banks's Stadium; Attendance: 3,846; Referee: James Oldham

20 December 2019	Macclesfield Town	Fixture not fulfilled	Plymouth Argyle	Macclesfield
15:00 GMT				Stadium: Moss Rose
Note: The fixture was postponed by the EFL on 20 December due to Macclesfield being handed a zero capacity notice by the local Safety Advisory Group

26 December 2019 21	Macclesfield Town	1–1	Grimsby Town	Macclesfield
15:00 GMT	Fitzpatrick (yellow card) 38'; Ironside 49' (pen.); Horsfall (yellow card) 75'; Harris (yellow card) 86'	Report	Hendrie (yellow card) 45+1'; Wright (yellow card) 54'; Vernam 59'; Davis (yellow card) 83'	Stadium: Moss Rose; Attendance: 1,991; Referee: Paul Marsden

29 December 2019 22	Forest Green Rovers	1–0	Macclesfield Town	Nailsworth
15:00 GMT	Adams (yellow card) 45'; Frear (yellow card) 69'; Rawson 74'; Collins (yellow card) 90+4'	Report	O'Keeffe (yellow card) 59'	Stadium: The New Lawn; Attendance: 2,155; Referee: Alan Young

1 January 2020 23	Port Vale	2–2	Macclesfield Town	Burslem
15:00 GMT	Worrall 18'; Amoo 62'; Joyce (yellow card) 73'	Report	Harris 56'; Ironside 57'; Kirby (yellow card) 74'	Stadium: Vale Park; Attendance: 5,350; Referee: Ben Toner

4 January 2020 24	Macclesfield Town	1–0	Cambridge United	Macclesfield
15:00 GMT	Gnahoua 5'; Welch-Hayes (yellow card) 58'	Report	Jones (yellow card) 58'; Hannant (yellow card) 78'	Stadium: Moss Rose; Attendance: 1,454; Referee: Tom Nield

11 January 2020 25	Macclesfield Town	1–1	Oldham Athletic	Macclesfield
15:00 GMT	Kirby (yellow card) 23'; Ironside 90+1' (pen.)	Report	Missilou (yellow card) 22'; Smith 85'; Wheater (red card) 90'	Stadium: Moss Rose; Attendance: 2,205; Referee: Peter Wright

18 January 2020 26	Colchester United	2–1	Macclesfield Town	Colchester
15:00 GMT	Harriott 14'; Kelleher 16' (o.g.); Poku (yellow card) 59'; Gerken (yellow card) 79'	Report	McCourt (yellow card) 59'; Stephens 72'; Kelleher (yellow card) 89'; Fitzpatrick (yellow card) 90+4'	Stadium: JobServe Community Stadium; Attendance: 3,252; Referee: David Rock

21 January 2020 27	Macclesfield Town	1–1	Crewe Alexandra	Macclesfield
19:45 GMT	Green 44' (o.g.); Gnahoua (yellow card) 65'; O'Keeffe (yellow card) 87'	Report	Ainley 90+5'; Hunt (yellow card) 90+6'	Stadium: Moss Rose; Attendance: 2,435; Referee: Christopher Pollard

25 January 2020 28	Macclesfield Town	2–1	Forest Green Rovers	Macclesfield
15:00 GMT	Horsfall (yellow card) 69'; Ironside 74'; O'Keeffe (red card) 80'; Gnahoua 83'	Report	Winchester 17'; March (penalty missed) 48'	Stadium: Moss Rose; Attendance: 1,653; Referee: Martin Coy

28 January 2020 29	Newport County	1–0	Macclesfield Town	Newport
19:45 GMT	Labadie 34'; Baker (yellow card) 44'	Report	Whitehead (yellow card) 31'; Fitzpatrick (yellow card) 88'	Stadium: Rodney Parade; Attendance: 3,354; Referee: Graham Salisbury

1 February 2020 30	Macclesfield Town	0–1	Northampton Town	Macclesfield
15:00 GMT	Kirby (yellow card) 36'	Report	Morton 59'; Cornell (yellow card) 90+1'	Stadium: Moss Rose; Attendance: 1,712; Referee: John Busby

8 February 2020 31	Leyton Orient	1–1	Macclesfield Town	Leyton
15:00 GMT	Clay (yellow card) 13'; Brophy 75'	Report	Blyth 90+1'	Stadium: Breyer Group Stadium; Attendance: 5,708; Referee: Nick Kinseley

11 February 2020 32	Morecambe	2–0	Macclesfield Town	Morecambe
19:45 GMT	Diagouraga 18'; Wildig 35'	Report		Stadium: Globe Arena; Attendance: 1,611; Referee: Michael Salisbury

15 February 2020 33	Macclesfield Town	2–3	Exeter City	Macclesfield
15:00 GMT	Kirby 40'; Kelleher 63'; Archibald (yellow card) 87'	Report	Ajose 11'; Martin (yellow card) 13'; Sweeney 17'; Dickenson (yellow card) 75'; Bowman 86'	Stadium: Moss Rose; Attendance: 1,389; Referee: Thomas Bramall

18 February 2020 34	Macclesfield Town	1–1	Plymouth Argyle	Macclesfield
19:45 GMT	Tracey 33'; Archibald (yellow card) 70'; O'Keeffe (yellow card) 85'; Horsfall (yellow card) 90+4'	Report	Sarcevic 84' (yellow card) 85'	Stadium: Moss Rose; Attendance: 1,887; Referee: Neil Hair

22 February 2020 35	Crewe Alexandra	2–0	Macclesfield Town	Crewe
15:00 GMT	Porter 11' (pen.); Walker 35'; Wintle (yellow card) 44'	Report	Kelleher (yellow card) 53'	Stadium: Alexandra Stadium; Attendance: 5,413; Referee: Ross Joyce

29 February 2020 36	Macclesfield Town	0–2	Salford City	Macclesfield
15:00 GMT	McCourt (yellow card) 68'	Report	Hunter 30' (yellow card) 43'; Towell 37'	Stadium: Moss Rose; Attendance: 2,317; Referee: Trevor Kettle

7 March 2020 37	Plymouth Argyle	3–0	Macclesfield Town	Plymouth
15:00 GMT	Hardie 33'; Cooper 62', 77'	Report	Kirby (yellow card) 14'	Stadium: Home Park; Attendance: 12,310; Referee: Christopher Sarginson

14 March 2020	Macclesfield Town	v	Walsall	Macclesfield
15:00 GMT				Stadium: Moss Rose
Note: Season was suspended until 3 April 2020, due to the COVID-19 pandemic.

17 March 2020	Macclesfield Town	v	Cheltenham Town	Macclesfield
19:45 GMT				Stadium: Moss Rose
Note: Season was suspended until 3 April 2020, due to the COVID-19 pandemic.

21 March 2020	Bradford City	v	Macclesfield Town	Bradford
15:00 GMT				Stadium: Utilita Energy Stadium
Note: Season was suspended until 3 April 2020, due to the COVID-19 pandemic.

28 March 2020	Macclesfield Town	v	Carlisle United	Macclesfield
15:00 GMT				Stadium: Moss Rose
Note: Season was suspended until 3 April 2020, due to the COVID-19 pandemic.

4 April 2020	Mansfield Town	v	Macclesfield Town	Mansfield
15:00 BST				Stadium: One Call Stadium
Note: On 3 April, the English Football League decided to postpone all football until safe to do so due to the COVID-19 pandemic.

10 April 2020	Scunthorpe United	v	Macclesfield Town	Scunthorpe
15:00 BST				Stadium: Sands Venue Stadium
Note: On 3 April, the English Football League decided to postpone all football until safe to do so due to the COVID-19 pandemic.

13 April 2020	Macclesfield Town	v	Stevenage	Macclesfield
13:00 BST				Stadium: Moss Rose
Note: On 3 April, the English Football League decided to postpone all football until safe to do so due to the COVID-19 pandemic.

18 April 2020	Crawley Town	v	Macclesfield Town	Crawley
15:00 BST				Stadium: Broadfield Stadium
Note: On 3 April, the English Football League decided to postpone all football until safe to do so due to the COVID-19 pandemic.

25 April 2020	Macclesfield Town	v	Swindon Town	Macclesfield
15:00 BST				Stadium: Moss Rose
Note: On 3 April, the English Football League decided to postpone all football until safe to do so due to the COVID-19 pandemic.

=== FA Cup ===
The first round draw was made on 21 October 2019.

10 November 2019 First round	Macclesfield Town	0–4	Kingstonian	Macclesfield
12:45 GMT	Kirby (yellow card) 74'	Report	Hector 7'; Theophanous 11', 69'; Bennett 47'; Clohessy (yellow card) 74'	Stadium: Moss Rose Ground; Attendance: 996; Referee: Will Finnie

=== EFL Cup ===
The first round draw was made on 20 June. The second round draw was made on 13 August 2019 following the conclusion of all but one first-round matches.

13 August 2019 First round	Blackpool	2–2 (2–4 p)	Macclesfield Town	Blackpool
19:45 BST	Bushiri (yellow card) 21'; Thompson 31'; Spearing (yellow card) 65'; Gnanduillet 90' (pen.)	Report	Bushiri 39' (o.g.); Gomis 65', (yellow card) 92'; Archibald (yellow card) 72'; Kirby (yellow card) 74'	Stadium: Bloomfield Road; Attendance: 3,715; Referee: Martin Coy
	Penalties
	Pritchard (penalty scored); Kaikai (penalty missed); Delfouneso (penalty scored); Thompson (penalty missed)		(penalty missed) Horsfall; (penalty scored) Archibald; (penalty scored) Osadebe; (penalty scored) Clarke; (penalty scored) Evans

27 August 2019 Second round	Grimsby Town	A–A	Macclesfield Town	Cleethorpes
19:45 BST	Wright (yellow card) 14'; Cook (yellow card) 35'	Report	Cameron (yellow card) 34'	Stadium: Blundell Park; Referee: Darren Drysdale
Note: Match was abandoned at half-time due to a waterlogged pitch.

10 September 2019 Second round	Grimsby Town	0–0 (5–4 p)	Macclesfield Town	Cleethorpes
19:45 BST	Whitehouse (yellow card) 16'; Hessenthaler (yellow card) 56'; Gibson (yellow card) 90'	Report		Stadium: Blundell Park; Attendance: 3,011; Referee: Darren Drysdale
	Penalties
	Green (penalty missed); Hanson (penalty scored); Cardwell (penalty scored); Ogbu (penalty scored); Hessenthaler (penalty scored); Whitehouse (penalty scored)		Ironside (penalty scored); Horsfall (penalty missed); Archibald (penalty scored); Gnahoua (penalty scored); Evans (penalty scored); Kirby (penalty missed)

=== EFL Trophy ===
On 9 July 2019, the pre-determined group stage draw was announced with Invited clubs to be drawn on 12 July 2019.

Pos	Div	Team	Pld	W	PW	PL	L	GF	GA	GD	Pts	Qualification
1	L2	Port Vale	3	3	0	0	0	7	4	+3	9	Advance to Round 2
2	L1	Shrewsbury Town	3	2	0	0	1	7	3	+4	6	Advance to Round 2
3	L2	Macclesfield Town	3	1	0	0	2	5	7	−2	3	
4	ACA	Newcastle United U21	3	0	0	0	3	2	7	−5	0	

Source: EFL.com

3 September 2019 Group stage	Macclesfield Town	2–1	Newcastle United U21	Macclesfield
19:45 BST	Fitzpatrick 19'; Kirby (yellow card) 36'; Gomis 63'	Report	Charman 48'; Cass (yellow card) 71'	Stadium: Moss Rose Ground; Attendance: 525; Referee: Oliver Yates

24 September 2019 Group stage	Macclesfield Town	2–3	Port Vale	Macclesfield
19:45 BST	Ironside 16'; Archibald 90+2'	Report	Burgess 34'; Bennett 52'; Taylor 74'	Stadium: Moss Rose Ground; Attendance: 757; Referee: Carl Boyeson

13 November 2019 Group stage	Shrewsbury Town	3–1	Macclesfield Town	Shrewsbury
19:30 GMT	Thompson 28'; Love (yellow card) 67' (yellow-red card) 76'; Edwards 74'; Walker 83'	Report	Harris (yellow card) 53'; Archibald 59'; Vassell (yellow card) 74'; Kirby (yellow card) 83'	Stadium: Montgomery Waters Meadow; Attendance: 1,065; Referee: Peter Wright

== Transfers ==
=== Transfers in ===
Date from	Position	Nationality	Name	From	Fee	Ref.
1 July 2019	CF	(England)	Jacob Blyth	(England) Barrow	Free transfer	
1 July 2019	CF	(England)	Joe Ironside	(England) Kidderminster Harriers	Free transfer	
1 July 2019	CM	(England)	Jak McCourt	(England) Swindon Town	Free transfer	
1 July 2019	RM	(Republic of Ireland)	Emmanuel Osadebe	(England) Cambridge United	Free transfer	
18 July 2019	RB	(England)	Theo Vassell	(England) Port Vale	Free transfer	
22 July 2019	CB	(England)	Fraser Horsfall	(England) Kidderminster Harriers	Free transfer	
30 July 2019	LM	(Scotland)	Theo Archibald	(England) Brentford	Free transfer	
1 August 2019	CM	(England)	Jay Harris	(England) Tranmere Rovers	Free transfer	
9 August 2019	GK	(England)	Reice Charles-Cook	(England) Shrewsbury Town	Free transfer	
31 January 2020	DM	(England)	Harry Hamblin	(England) Southampton	Undisclosed	
8 February 2020	CF	(England)	Donovan Wilson	(Spain) Burgos	Free transfer	
11 February 2020	LM	(England)	Ben Tollitt	(England) Blackpool	Free transfer	

=== Loans in ===
Date from	Position	Nationality	Name	From	Date until	Ref.
22 July 2019	LB	(England)	Eddie Clarke	(England) Fleetwood Town	16 January 2020	
25 July 2019	GK	(Wales)	Owen Evans	(England) Wigan Athletic	9 January 2020	
9 August 2019	CF	(France)	Virgil Gomis	(England) Nottingham Forest	30 June 2020	
9 August 2019	MF	(England)	Connor Kirby	(England) Sheffield Wednesday	30 June 2020	
9 August 2019	RB	(Republic of Ireland)	Corey O'Keeffe	(England) Birmingham City	30 June 2020	
21 January 2020	GK	(England)	Jonathan Mitchell	(England) Derby County	30 June 2020	
21 January 2020	CM	(England)	Danny Whitehead	(England) Salford City	30 June 2020	
31 January 2020	RW	(England)	Shilow Tracey	(England) Tottenham Hotspur	30 June 2020	

=== Loans out ===
Date from	Position	Nationality	Name	To	Date until	Ref.
20 September 2019	RM	(Jersey)	Peter Vincenti	(England) Hereford	1 January 2020	
26 December 2019	RW	(England)	Adam Dawson	(England) Radcliffe	January 2020	

=== Transfers out ===
Date from	Position	Nationality	Name	To	Fee	Ref.
1 July 2019	LM	(Ghana)	Enoch Andoh	(England) Hednesford Town	Released	
1 July 2019	AM	(Ghana)	Koby Arthur	Free agent	Released	
1 July 2019	LB	(Cyprus)	Stelios Demetriou	(England) Bradford Park Avenue	Released	
1 July 2019	CB	(England)	Jamie Grimes	(England) Ebbsfleet United	Released	
1 July 2019	RB	(England)	Jared Hodgkiss	(England) Hereford	Released	
1 July 2019	AM	(England)	Ryan Lloyd	(England) Port Vale	Released	
1 July 2019	CB	(England)	Keith Lowe	(England) Nuneaton Borough	Released	
1 July 2019	LW	(Curaçao)	Liandro Martis	Free agent	Released	
1 July 2019	CF	(England)	Shamir Mullings	(England) Aldershot Town	Released	
1 July 2019	CF	(England)	Harry Smith	(England) Northampton Town	Undisclosed	
1 July 2019	GK	(Wales)	Rhys Taylor	Free agent	Released	
5 July 2019	CF	(England)	Tyrone Marsh	(England) Boreham Wood	Mutual consent	
19 July 2019	CF	(England)	Scott Wilson	(England) Oldham Athletic	Mutual consent	
20 July 2019	DM	(England)	Callum Evans	(England) Port Vale	Mutual consent	
26 July 2019	CB	(Scotland)	Zak Jules	(England) Walsall	Undisclosed	
26 September 2019	RW	(England)	Elliott Durrell	(England) York City	Free transfer	
15 November 2019	CF	(England)	Kyle Campbell	(England) Buxton	Free transfer	
31 January 2020	CM	(England)	Jay Harris	(Wales) Wrexham	Free transfer	
1 February 2020	RB	(England)	Theo Vassell	Free agent	Mutual Consent	
1 February 2020	RM	(Republic of Ireland)	Emmanuel Osadebe	Free agent	Mutual Consent	
21 February 2020	RB	(England)	Miles Welch-Hayes	(England) Colchester United	Free transfer	
13 May 2020	LM	(Scotland)	Theo Archibald	Free agent	Mutual Consent	
