= Emmanuel Osadebe =

Irish footballer (born 1996)

- Osadebe in 2026

Personal information
- Full name: Emmanuel Ebuka Osadebe
- Date of birth: 1 October 1996 (age 30)
- Place of birth: Dundalk, Ireland
- Height: 1.88 m (6 ft 2 in)
- Positions: Midfielder; winger; right-back

Team information
- Current team: Sutton United
- Number: 7

Youth career
- –2014: Dundalk
- 2014–2015: Tottenham Hotspur

Senior career*
Years	Team	Apps	(Gls)
2015–2017	Gillingham	42	(3)
2017–2019	Cambridge United	16	(0)
2018	→ Newport County (loan)	3	(0)
2019–2020	Macclesfield Town	25	(4)
2020–2022	Walsall	81	(6)
2022–2024	Bradford City	27	(1)
2024–2025	Forest Green Rovers	61	(4)
2025–2026	Barnet	9	(1)
2026–	Sutton United	0	(0)
- * Club domestic league appearances and goals as of 20:49, 1 July 2026 (UTC)

Emmanuel Ebuka Osadebe (born 1 October 1996) is an Irish professional footballer who plays as a midfielder, winger, or right-back for Sutton United.

== Club career ==
Osadebe started playing football with his local side Dundalk. He joined Gillingham from Tottenham Hotspur Foundation College Programme in May 2015. He made his Gillingham debut on 8 August 2015 in 4–0 home win over Sheffield United where he was named Man of the Match. However, it later emerged that Osadebe had been ineligible to play, with Gillingham having mistakenly registered his previous club with the Football League and the FA as Tottenham rather than Dundalk. As a result, Gillingham received a £4,000 suspended fine, but escaped a points deduction.

Osadebe received the 2015–16 Gillingham Goal of the Season award for his solo effort against Bury in November 2015. He signed a new one-year deal with Gillingham, with the option of a further one-year extension, at the conclusion of the 2015–16 season, however he was released by the club a year later.

On 31 May 2017, Osadebe joined League Two side Cambridge United on a two-year deal. On 18 January 2018, Osadebe joined Newport County on loan until the end of the 2017–18 season. He made his debut for Newport five days later against Morecambe as a half-time substitute. His loan arrangement at Newport was terminated on 23 March 2018 and he returned to Cambridge United.

He was released by Cambridge United at the end of the 2018–19 season. In the summer of 2019 he was signed by Macclesfield Town on a one-year deal. On 1 February 2020 it was announced that he was one of three players to have left financially troubled Macclesfield during the January 2020 transfer window, following a meeting with the English Football League.

On 3 September 2020, he joined Walsall on a free transfer. In his almost two years there, he played 91 games, scoring 8 goals.

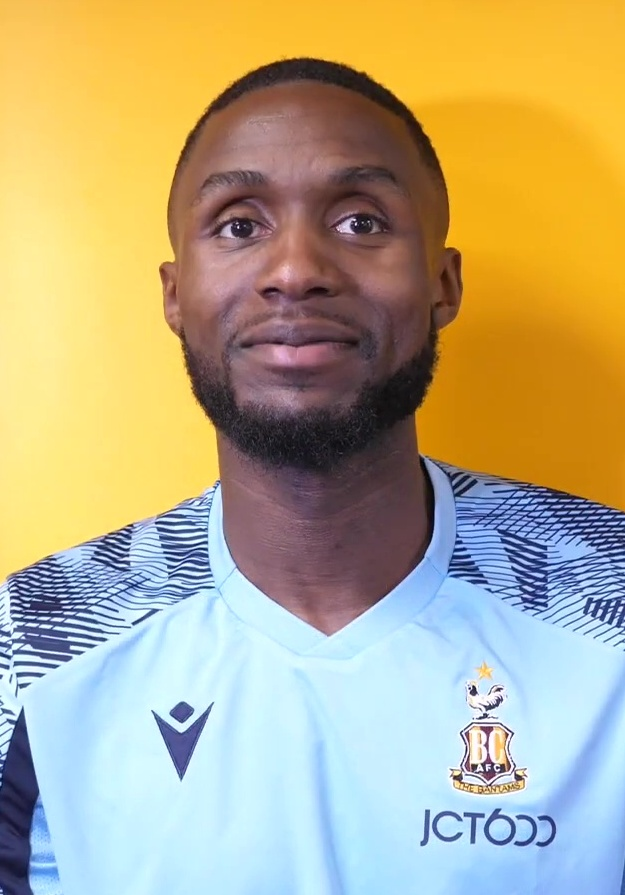
Osadebe pictured during his time at Bradford City

On 10 June 2022, Osadebe joined fellow League Two side Bradford City for an undisclosed fee, signing a two-year contract. Osadebe's first league game for Bradford came to an end after just seven minutes when he broke his leg in two places against Doncaster Rovers.

On 18 January 2024, Osadebe signed for fellow League Two club Forest Green Rovers for an undisclosed fee. Even after some great performances for Forest Green Rovers including goals against Barrow, Wrexham and former club Walsall, he could not keep them up and they were relegated to the National League in the 2024–25 season. Across two seasons with the club, he scored five goals in 68 games.

Osadebe returned to the EFL when he signed for Barnet for the 2025–26 season. After two goals in thirteen appearances, he was not retained at the end of the season.

In June 2026, Sutton United announced that Osadebe would join them for the 2026–27 season.

== International career ==
In November 2015 Osadebe was invited to train with the Republic of Ireland U21 squad ahead of their friendly against Norway, but did not feature in the matchday squad. As his parents hail from Nigeria, Osadebe is also eligible to represent Nigeria.

== Career statistics ==
As of end of 2025–26 season

Appearances and goals by club, season and competition
Club	Season	League			FA Cup		League Cup		Other		Total	
Club	Season	Division	Apps	Goals	Apps	Goals	Apps	Goals	Apps	Goals	Apps	Goals
Gillingham	2015–16	League One	18	2	1	0	0	0	2 (Note: Appearances in Football League Trophy)	0	21	2
Gillingham	2016–17	League One	24	1	1	0	3	0	3 (Note: Appearances in EFL Trophy)	0	31	1
Gillingham	Total		42	3	2	0	3	0	5	0	52	3
Cambridge United	2017–18	League Two	4	0	0	0	1	0	2	0	7	0
Cambridge United	2018–19	League Two	12	0	0	0	1	0	3	1	16	1
Cambridge United	Total		16	0	0	0	2	0	5	1	23	1
Newport County (loan)	2017–18	League Two	3	0	—		—		—		3	0
Macclesfield Town	2019–20	League Two	25	4	0	0	2	0	3	0	30	4
Walsall	2020–21	League Two	38	3	0	0	0	0	3	0	41	3
Walsall	2021–22	League Two	43	3	2	1	1	0	4	1	50	5
Walsall	Total		81	6	2	1	1	0	7	1	91	8
Bradford City	2022–23	League Two	10	0	0	0	0	0	2 (Note: Appearances in League Two play-offs)	0	12	0
Bradford City	2023–24	League Two	17	1	1	0	1	0	2	1	21	2
Bradford City	Total		27	1	1	0	1	0	4	1	33	2
Forest Green Rovers	2023–24	League Two	20	3	—		—		—		20	3
Forest Green Rovers	2024–25	National League	41	1	1	0	—		6 (Note: Three appearances in FA Trophy, two appearance in National League Cup, one appearance and one goal in National League playoffs)	1	48	2
Forest Green Rovers	Total		61	4	1	0	0	0	6	1	68	5
Barnet	2025–26	League Two	9	1	0	0	1	0	3	1	13	2
Career total			264	19	6	1	10	0	33	5	313	26
