= Rhys Tyler =

English footballer

Personal information
- Date of birth: 18 June 1992 (age 34)
- Place of birth: Reading, Berkshire, England
- Height: 1.78 m (5 ft 10 in)
- Position: Left back

Team information
- Current team: Hungerford Town

Youth career
- 2000–2010: Reading

Senior career*
Years	Team	Apps	(Gls)
2010–2012	Rot-Weiß Erfurt	2	(0)
2012–2015	Rot-Weiß Oberhausen	50	(3)
2015–2018	Hungerford Town	126	(8)
2018–2019	Wealdstone	29	(0)
2019–2020	Chippenham Town	31	(2)
2020–	Hungerford Town	113	(4)
- * Club domestic league appearances and goals as of 08:35, 15 August 2024 (UTC)

Rhys Tyler (born 18 June 1992) is an English semi-professional footballer who plays for Hungerford Town as a left back.

== Career ==
Tyler began his career with the youth team of Reading, joining at the age of 8. After being released by Reading, he played professionally in Germany with Rot-Weiß Erfurt and Rot-Weiß Oberhausen. He returned to England with Hungerford Town in August 2015. He made 46 league appearances in his first season with the club, scoring 6 goals. He moved to Wealdstone in May 2018. On 22 June 2019, Tyler signed for National League South side Chippenham Town. In October 2020, Tyler rejoined Hungerford Town.
