= Arnaud Luzayadio =

French footballer (born 1999)

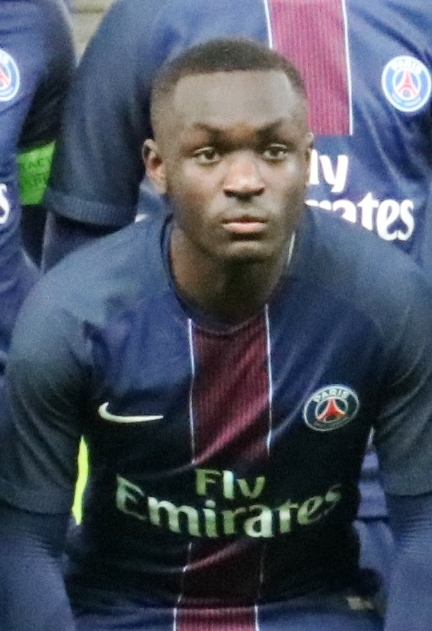
- Luzayadio in 2017

Personal information
- Full name: Arnaud Nathanaël Luzayadio Nkodi
- Date of birth: 19 July 1999 (age 27)
- Place of birth: Montreuil, France
- Height: 1.76 m (5 ft 9 in)
- Position: Right-back

Team information
- Current team: Le Pays du Valois
- Number: 29

Youth career
- 2007–2011: RSC Montreuil
- 2011–2012: Paris FC
- 2012–2018: Paris Saint-Germain

Senior career*
Years	Team	Apps	(Gls)
2018–2019	Paris Saint-Germain B	28	(0)
2019–2021	Orléans	3	(0)
2019–2021	Orléans B	7	(0)
2021–2023	Emmen	31	(0)
2024–2025	Pirin Blagoevgrad	14	(1)
2025	Olbia	8	(0)
2025-	Le Pays du Valois	8	(0)
- * Club domestic league appearances and goals as of 28 March 2026

Arnaud Nathanaël Luzayadio Nkodi (born 19 July 1999) is a French professional footballer who plays as a right-back for French club Le Pays du Valois.

== Career ==
Luzayadio joined US Orléans from the Paris Saint-Germain Academy on a three-year deal on 21 June 2019, a few days after signing a professional contract with the Paris club. The deal was part of a development partnership being established between the two clubs. He made his professional debut for Orléans in a 1–0 Ligue 2 loss to FC Chambly on 2 August 2019.

On 26 July 2021, he signed a one-year contract with Dutch club Emmen.

== Personal life ==
Born in France, Luzayadio is of Congolese descent.

== Honours ==
Emmen

- Eerste Divisie: 2021–22
