= Tyler Frost =

English footballer (born 1999)

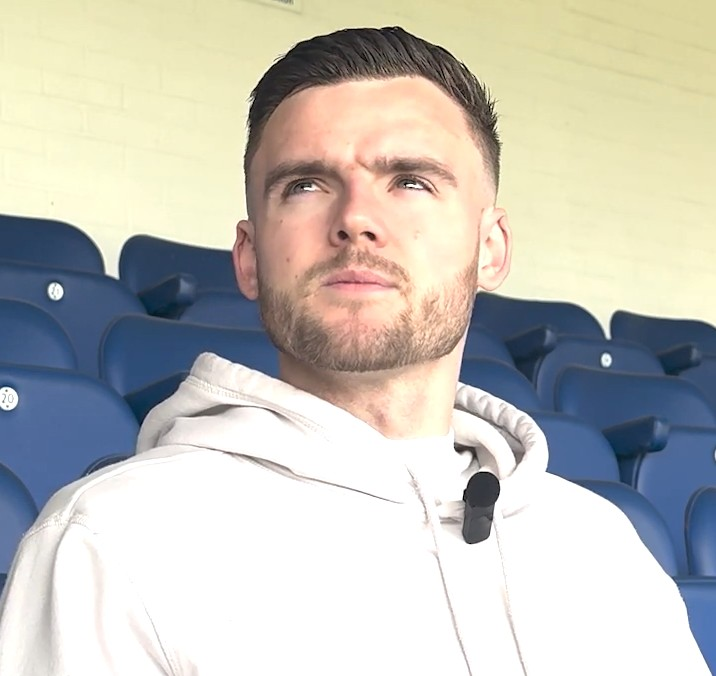
- Frost in March 2024

Personal information
- Full name: Tyler Jayden Frost
- Date of birth: 7 July 1999 (age 27)
- Place of birth: Reading, England
- Height: 5 ft 9 in (1.75 m)
- Position: Midfielder

Team information
- Current team: Farnborough

Youth career
- 2014–2018: Reading

Senior career*
Years	Team	Apps	(Gls)
2018–2020	Reading	0	(0)
2018–2019	→ Havant & Waterlooville (loan)	7	(1)
2020–2022	Crawley Town	37	(2)
2022–2023	Harrogate Town	9	(0)
2023–2026	Aldershot Town	105	(14)
2026–	Farnborough	0	(0)
- * Club domestic league appearances and goals as of 19:49, 27 April 2026 (UTC)

Tyler Jayden Frost (born 7 June 1999) is an English professional footballer who plays as a midfielder for National League South club Farnborough.

Frost started his career at Reading and had a loan spell at Havant & Waterlooville before playing for Crawley Town and Harrogate Town.

== Early life and education ==
Born in Reading, Frost attended The Forest School in Winnersh.

== Career ==
Frost started his career at Reading, joining the club's youth academy in 2014 at the age of 15, before signing his first professional contract with the club in 2017. In December 2018, Frost joined National League side Havant & Waterlooville on loan, scoring on his debut in a 1–1 draw against Hartlepool United on 22 December 2020. He made 7 league appearances in total for the club, scoring once. At the end of the 2018–19 season, he signed a new contract at Reading. In February 2020, he had a trial period at Sunderland, but did not sign for the club, before being released by Reading in July 2020 upon the expiry of his contract.

On 1 August 2020, Frost signed for League Two side Crawley Town on a two-year contract. He made his debut for Crawley on 5 September 2020 in a 3–1 EFL Cup defeat to Millwall, and scored his first goal for them on 17 October 2020 in a 4–0 victory over Morecambe. Frost was released at the end of the 2021–22 season.

Following a trial spell at the club, Frost signed for League Two club Harrogate Town on a six-month deal in July 2022. He left the club in January 2023, and signed for Aldershot Town in February 2023. On 27 April 2026, it was announced that Frost would leave the club at the end of his contract in June.

On 24 June 2026, Frost joined National League South club Farnborough.

== Style of play ==
Frost generally plays as a right midfielder, but can also play as a central midfielder or left midfielder.

== Career statistics ==
As of match played 5 March 2022

Appearances and goals by club, season and competition
Club	Season	League			FA Cup		League Cup		Other		Total	
Club	Season	Division	Apps	Goals	Apps	Goals	Apps	Goals	Apps	Goals	Apps	Goals
Reading U21	2016–17	—			—		—		5 (Note: Appearance(s) in EFL Trophy)	0	5	0
Reading U21	2017–18	—			—		—		3	0	3	0
Reading U21	Total		0	0	0	0	0	0	8	0	8	0
Reading	2018–19	Championship	0	0	0	0	0	0	0	0	0	0
Reading	2019–20	Championship	0	0	0	0	0	0	0	0	0	0
Reading	Total		0	0	0	0	0	0	0	0	0	0
Havant & Waterlooville (loan)	2018–19	National League	7	1	0	0	—		0	0	7	1
Crawley Town	2020–21	League Two	23	2	2	0	1	0	1	0	27	2
Crawley Town	2021–22	League Two	14	0	1	0	1	0	3	0	19	0
Crawley Town	Total		37	2	3	0	2	0	4	0	46	2
Career total			44	3	3	0	2	0	12	0	61	3

== Honours ==
Aldershot Town

- FA Trophy: 2024–25
