= Connor Kirby =

English footballer (born 1998)

Personal information
- Full name: Connor Alexander Kirby
- Date of birth: 10 September 1998 (age 28)
- Place of birth: Barnsley, England
- Height: 5 ft 9 in (1.74 m)
- Position: Midfielder

Team information
- Current team: Buxton
- Number: 8

Youth career
- –2017: Sheffield Wednesday

Senior career*
| Years | Team | Apps | (Gls) |
| 2017–2020 | Sheffield Wednesday | 2 | (0) |
| 2019–2020 | → Macclesfield Town (loan) | 34 | (1) |
| 2020–2022 | Harrogate Town | 16 | (0) |
| 2021 | → Altrincham (loan) | 11 | (2) |
| 2022– | Buxton | 171 | (26) |
- * Club domestic league appearances and goals as of 12:59, 22 April 2026 (UTC)

Connor Alexander Kirby (born 10 September 1998) is an English professional footballer who plays as a midfielder for Buxton. He has previously had spells at Macclesfield Town, Altrincham and started his career at Sheffield Wednesday.

== Career ==
=== Sheffield Wednesday ===
Kirby was born in Barnsley and grew up in the Worsbrough Common neighborhood of the town. He came through the academy at Sheffield Wednesday and signed his first professional contract for Sheffield Wednesday in October 2015.

On 5 March 2018, he signed a new contract with the club, valid until summer 2020. In April 2018 he made his first-team debut for the club, playing as a substitute as Wednesday beat Reading in the Football League Championship.

==== Macclesfield Town (loan) ====
Kirby signed on a season-long loan at Macclesfield Town on 9 August 2019. He made 34 League Two appearances, scoring once, over the course of the 2019–20 season, as Macclesfield were relegated from League Two, after being given an 11 point deduction. He was released by Sheffield Wednesday in summer 2020.

=== Harrogate Town ===
Kirby was the first signing for Harrogate Town in their first season in the Football League. On 21 April 2021, he joined National League side Altrincham on loan for the remainder of the season. After a successful loan spell the previous season, Kirby returned to Altrincham on loan in July, signing until 3 January 2022. On 11 September 2021, Kirby suffered a double compound fracture of his left leg, in a game against Wealdstone. He was released by Harrogate in summer 2022.

=== Buxton ===
On 15 July 2022, Kirby joined Buxton for their first season in the National League North following promotion.

== Career statistics ==
As of 11 September 2021

| Club | Season | League | | | FA Cup | | League Cup | | Other | | Total | |
| Club | Season | Division | App | Goals | App | Goals | App | Goals | App | Goals | App | Goals |
|---|---|---|---|---|---|---|---|---|---|---|---|---|
| Sheffield Wednesday | 2017–18 | Championship | 1 | 0 | 0 | 0 | 0 | 0 | 0 | 0 | 1 | 0 |
| Sheffield Wednesday | 2018–19 | Championship | 1 | 0 | 0 | 0 | 2 | 0 | 0 | 0 | 3 | 0 |
| Sheffield Wednesday | Total | | 2 | 0 | 0 | 0 | 2 | 0 | 0 | 0 | 4 | 0 |
| Macclesfield Town (loan) | 2019–20 | League Two | 34 | 1 | 1 | 0 | 2 | 0 | 2 (Note: Appearances in the Football League Trophy) | 0 | 39 | 1 |
| Harrogate Town | 2019–20 (Note: The 2019–20 FA Trophy was delayed because of the COVID-19 pandemic, causing Harrogate to play it during the 2020–21 season, the match counting as an appearance in the 2019–20 season.) | – | – | – | – | – | – | – | 1 (Note: Appearance in the FA Trophy) | 0 | 1 | 0 |
| Harrogate Town | 2020–21 | League Two | 16 | 0 | 2 | 0 | 1 | 0 | 3 | 0 | 22 | 0 |
| Harrogate Town | Total | | 16 | 0 | 2 | 0 | 1 | 0 | 4 | 0 | 23 | 0 |
| Altrincham (loan) | 2020–21 | National League | 7 | 1 | 0 | 0 | 0 | 0 | 0 | 0 | 7 | 1 |
| Altrincham (loan) | 2021–22 | National League | 4 | 1 | 0 | 0 | 0 | 0 | 0 | 0 | 4 | 1 |
| Altrincham (loan) | Total | | 11 | 2 | 0 | 0 | 0 | 0 | 0 | 0 | 11 | 2 |
| Career total | | | 61 | 3 | 3 | 0 | 5 | 0 | 6 | 0 | 77 | 3 |
