= Harry Hamblin =

English footballer

Personal information
- Full name: Harry Mark Hamblin
- Date of birth: 13 October 1999 (age 27)
- Position: Midfielder

Team information
- Current team: Bracknell Town
- Number: 18

Youth career
- Southampton

Senior career*
Years	Team	Apps	(Gls)
2019–2020	Southampton	0	(0)
2019–2020	→ Bath City (loan)	10	(1)
2020	Macclesfield Town	4	(0)
2024	Sandhurst Town	15	(0)
2024–2025	Holyport	29	(1)
2025–2026	Yateley United	37	(5)
2026–	Bracknell Town	4	(1)
- * Club domestic league appearances and goals as of 16:38, 29 August 2026 (UTC)

Harry Mark Hamblin (born 13 October 1999) is an English professional footballer who plays as a midfielder for Bracknell Town.

== Career ==
Hamblin started his football career at Southampton, progressing through the youth ranks to make his debut in the club's under-18s during the 2015–16 season. During the 2018–19 season he played regularly for the Saints under-23s. In July 2019, he went on a six-month loan to National League South side Bath City, making his debut against Braintree Town on 3 August 2019, and scoring his first goal for the club, an 87th-minute equalizer in a 2–2 draw against Eastbourne Borough, on 14 September 2019.

On 31 January 2020, he joined Macclesfield Town on a free transfer, making his Football League and club debut at Moss Rose the following day against Northampton Town.

He was released at the end of the 2019–20 season.

After four years away from the game, Hamblin had spells with Sandhurst Town, Holyport and Yateley United. He then joined Bracknell Town for the 2026-27 season.

== Career statistics ==
As of 19 February 2020.

Appearances and goals by club, season and competition
Club	Season	League			FA Cup		League Cup		Other		Total	
Club	Season	Division	Apps	Goals	Apps	Goals	Apps	Goals	Apps	Goals	Apps	Goals
Southampton	2019–20	Premier League	0	0	0	0	0	0	0	0	0	0
Bath City (loan)	2019–20	National League South	10	1	1	0	0	0	0	0	11	1
Macclesfield Town	2019–20	EFL League Two	4	0	0	0	0	0	0	0	4	0
Career total			14	1	1	0	0	0	0	0	15	1
