= Peter Scott (footballer, born 1963) =

English footballer

Personal information
- Date of birth: 1 October 1963 (age 63)
- Place of birth: Notting Hill, London, England
- Height: 5 ft 9 in (1.75 m)
- Position: Midfielder

Youth career
- Fulham

Senior career*
Years	Team	Apps	(Gls)
1981–1992	Fulham	277	(27)
1992–1993	AFC Bournemouth	10	(0)
1993–1996	Barnet	78	(2)
1996	Hayes		
1996–1998	Aylesbury United	20	(0)
- * Club domestic league appearances and goals

Peter Scott (born 1 October 1963) is an English former footballer who played for Fulham for most of his career, and also represented AFC Bournemouth and Barnet in league football.

In eleven years at Fulham, he made over 300 appearances including 277 in the league and scored 34 goals across all competitions. He moved to Bournemouth in 1992, playing 10 times in the league without getting on the scoresheet, and fourteen matches in total. He next joined Barnet in 1993, spending three years there until 1996, notching two goals in 78 league games. He also went on to play for Hayes briefly and ended his career playing part-time with Aylesbury United.

Since retirement, Scott has remained involved in football, gaining his coaching badges and taking up a position at Uxbridge College in 2007, running their football development programme in conjunction with Yeading F.C. and Aylesbury F.C. Alongside this, he also coached Beaconsfield SYCOB F.C. (now Beaconsfield Town F.C.) in the Spartan South Midlands Premier League. His son, Tom, joined AFC Wimbledon's academy team and won the Academy Player of the Year award in 2017.
