= 2024–25 Wycombe Wanderers F.C. season =

138th season in existence of Wycombe Wanderers FC

Wycombe Wanderers
2024–25 season
- Owner: Blue Ocean Partners II Ltd (90%), Wycombe Wanderers Supporters' Trust (10%)
- Chairman: Dan Rice (Interim)
- Manager: Matt Bloomfield (until 14 January); Mike Dodds (from 2 February 2025)
- Stadium: Adams Park
- League One: 5th
- FA Cup: Fourth round
- EFL Cup: Third round
- EFL Trophy: Group stage
- Top goalscorer: League: Richard Kone (16); All: Richard Kone (19)
- Average home league attendance: 5,362
Home colours	Away colours	Third colours

The 2024–25 season was the 138th season in the history of Wycombe Wanderers Football Club and their fourth consecutive season in League One. In addition to the domestic league, the club would also participate in the FA Cup, the EFL Cup, and the EFL Trophy. This will be Wycombe's First Season without Rob Couhig in any capacity with Dan Rice taking interim charge as the chairman, as well as Georgian-Kazakh billionaire Mikhail Lomtadze having 90% shares of the club.

== Transfers ==
=== In ===
Date	Pos.	Player	From	Fee	Ref.
1 July 2024	CM	(England) Tyreeq Bakinson	(England) Sheffield Wednesday	Free	
1 July 2024 (Note: The transfer was announced on 5 June, and would become official on 1 July once his Wealdstone contract expired)	CF	(Gibraltar) Jaiden Bartolo	(England) Wealdstone	Free	
1 July 2024 (Note: The transfer was announced on 30 May, and would become official on 1 July once his Exeter City contract expired)	CB	(England) Alex Hartridge	(England) Exeter City	Free	
1 July 2024 (Note: The transfer was announced on 5 June, and would become official on 1 July once his Woking contract expired)	CB	(England) Jack Matton	(England) Woking	Free	
1 July 2024 (Note: The transfer was announced on 28 June, and would become official on 1 July once his Brighton & Hove Albion contract expired)	RW	(England) Brody Peart	(England) Brighton & Hove Albion	Free	
3 July 2024	LB	(Scotland) Daniel Harvie	(England) Milton Keynes Dons	Undisclosed	
3 July 2024	CF	(Nigeria) Daniel Udoh	(England) Shrewsbury Town	Free	
29 July 2024	CF	(England) Jahiem Dotse	(England) Blackfield & Langley	Free	
30 August 2024	GK	(England) Shamal George	(Scotland) Livingston	Undisclosed	
10 September 2024	LW	(Nigeria) Fred Onyedinma	(England) Luton Town	Free	
6 January 2025	LW	(England) Ryan Cole	(England) Newmarket Town	Undisclosed	
6 January 2025	GK	(England) Jonny Pettitt	(England) Pro Direct Academy	Free	
9 January 2025	CB	(Denmark) Anders Hagelskjær	(Norway) Molde	£400,000	
16 January 2025	CM	(Denmark) Magnus Westergaard	(Denmark) Viborg	Undisclosed	
21 January 2025	AM	(Scotland) Alex Lowry	(Scotland) Rangers	Undisclosed	
22 January 2025	LW	(England) James Berry	(England) Chesterfield	Undisclosed	
3 February 2025	RB	(England) Fin Back	(England) Nottingham Forest	Free	
3 February 2025	GK	(England) Will Norris	(England) Portsmouth	Free	
3 February 2025	LM	(England) Adam Reach	(England) West Bromwich Albion	Free	
5 February 2025	LW	(England) Koray Gurpinar (Note: Signed initially for the Academy)	(England) AFC Whyteleafe	Free	
5 February 2025	CB	(England) Christian Swaby	(England) Chesham United	Free	

=== Out ===
Date	Position	Player	To	Fee	Ref

=== Loaned in ===
Date	Pos.	Player	From	Date until	Ref.
1 July 2024 (Note: The loan was announced on 25 June, and would officially commence on 1 July)	GK	(England) Nathan Bishop	(England) Sunderland	3 February 2025 (Note: On 3 February, Bishop was recalled back to his parent club Sunderland)	
21 August 2024	CM	(England) Cameron Humphreys	(England) Ipswich Town	End of Season	
23 August 2024	RW	(England) Gideon Kodua	(England) West Ham United	End of Season	
23 August 2024	CM	(England) Aaron Morley	(England) Bolton Wanderers	1 January 2025 (Note: On 1 January, Morley was recalled back to Bolton.)	
30 August 2024	CB	(England) Caleb Taylor	(England) West Bromwich Albion	2 January 2025 (Note: On 2 January, Taylor was recalled back to West Brom.)	
6 January 2025	CB	(England) Sonny Bradley	(England) Derby County	End of Season	
29 January 2025	CB	(England) Caleb Taylor	(England) West Bromwich Albion	End of Season	
3 February 2025	DM	(England) Xavier Simons	(England) Hull City	End of Season	

=== Loaned out ===
Date	Pos.	Player	To	Date until	Ref.
1 July 2024 (Note: The loan was announced on 28 June, and would officially commence on 1 July)	CM	(England) Taylor Clark	(England) Farnborough	1 January 2025	
13 August 2024	CB	(England) Luca Woodhouse	(England) Dagenham & Redbridge	1 January 2025	
6 September 2024	GK	(Kosovo) Laurence Shala	(England) Potters Bar Town	5 January 2025 (Note: On 4 October, Shala's loan at Potters Bar was extended by a further two months)	
7 September 2024	AM	(England) Christie Ward	(England) Braintree Town	5 October 2024	
4 October 2024	CF	(England) Jahiem Dotse	(England) Bracknell Town	2 November 2024	
4 October 2024	AM	(England) Christie Ward	(England) Weymouth	2 November 2024	
10 October 2024	CM	(England) Jack Young	(England) Dorking Wanderers	1 January 2025	
14 October 2024	CB	(England) Jack Matton	(England) Bracknell Town	11 November 2024	
17 January 2025	CB	(England) Luca Woodhouse	(England) Aldershot Town	End of Season	
20 January 2025	CM	(England) Taylor Clark	(England) Wealdstone	End of Season	
24 January 2025	CB	(England) Ryan Tafazolli	(Hong Kong) Lee Man	End of Season	
30 January 2025	DM	(England) Matt Butcher	(England) Bristol Rovers	End of Season	
30 January 2025	CB	(England) Alex Hartridge	(England) Exeter City	End of Season	
31 January 2025	CF	(England) Brandon Hanlan	(England) Stevenage	End of Season	

=== Released / Out of Contract ===
Date	Pos.	Player	Subsequent club	Join date	Ref.
30 June 2024	CB	(Saint Lucia) Chris Forino-Joseph	(England) Bolton Wanderers	1 July 2024	
30 June 2024	GK	(Poland) Max Stryjek	(Poland) Jagiellonia Białystok	1 July 2024	
30 June 2024	CF	(England) D'Mani Mellor	(England) Gateshead	24 August 2024	
30 June 2024	CB	(England) Jack Wakely	(England) Ebbsfleet United	5 October 2024	
30 June 2024	GK	(Wales) Nathan Shepperd	(England) Queens Park Rangers	26 October 2024	
30 June 2024	RB	(England) Kane Vincent-Young	(England) Colchester United	3 February 2025	
30 June 2024	LB	(Wales) Joe Jacobson	Retired		
17 December 2024	RB	(England) Jason McCarthy	Retired		
5 February 2025	LW	(England) David Wheeler	(England) Shrewsbury Town	20 February 2025	

== Pre-season and friendlies ==
On 22 May, Wycombe announced their first pre-season fixture, against Watford. On 4 June, Aylesbury United announced that they will be facing Wycombe at Holloway Park in Beaconsfield. On 13 June, Wycombe announced they would face Swindon Town. Two weeks later, a behind-closed-doors meeting with Notts County was confirmed. A second BCD fixture was added, against Colchester United.

Win Draw Loss Fixtures

28 June 2024 Friendly	Aylesbury United	3–3	Wycombe Wanderers	Beaconsfield
19:00 BST				Stadium: Holloway Park

13 July 2024 Friendly	Notts County	1–0	Wycombe Wanderers	Loughborough
12:30 BST	Trialist 55'	Report		Stadium: Loughborough University; Attendance: 0 (behind-closed-doors)

20 July 2024 Friendly	Wycombe Wanderers	2–2	Colchester United	Harlington
12:00 BST	Own goal; Kone	Report	Ihionvien; Jay	Stadium: Harlington Sports Ground; Attendance: 0 (behind-closed-doors)

27 July 2024 Friendly	Portsmouth	0–4	Wycombe Wanderers	Portsmouth
13:30 BST		Report	McCleary; Kone (pen.); Lubala; Trialist	Stadium: Copnor Training Ground; Attendance: 0 (behind-closed-doors); Referee: Dean Treleaven

30 July 2024 Friendly	Wycombe Wanderers	3–2	Watford	High Wycombe
19:30 BST	Lubala; Scowen; Kone 79'	Report	Chakvetadze; Rajović	Stadium: Adams Park; Attendance: 3,106

3 August 2024 Friendly	Swindon Town	1–0	Wycombe Wanderers	Swindon
15:00 BST	Clarke	Report		Stadium: County Ground (Swindon)

== Competitions ==
=== EFL League One ===
==== League table ====
Pos	Team	Pld	W	D	L	GF	GA	GD	Pts	Promotion, qualification or relegation
3	Stockport County	46	25	12	9	72	42	+30	87	Qualification for League One play-offs
4	Charlton Athletic (O, P)	46	25	10	11	67	43	+24	85	Qualification for League One play-offs
5	Wycombe Wanderers	46	24	12	10	70	45	+25	84	Qualification for League One play-offs
6	Leyton Orient	46	24	6	16	72	48	+24	78	Qualification for League One play-offs
7	Reading	46	21	12	13	68	57	+11	75	

Source: EFL Official Website
Rules for classification: 1) Points; 2) Goal difference; 3) Number of goals scored; 4) Head-to-head results; 5) Wins; 6) Away goals; 7) Penalty points (sec 9.5); 8) 12-point sending off offences
(O) Play-off winners; (P) Promoted

==== Results summary ====
Overall								Home						Away					
Pld	W	D	L	GF	GA	GD	Pts	W	D	L	GF	GA	GD	W	D	L	GF	GA	GD
46	24	12	10	70	45	+25	84	13	6	5	29	19	+10	11	6	5	41	26	+15

Last updated: 3 May 2025.
Source: Soccerway

==== Results by round ====
Round	1	2	3	4	6	7	8	9	10	12	13	14	11^{2}	15	17	5^{1}	18	19	20	21	22	23	24	25	16^{3}	27	28	29	30	32	31^{5}	33	34	35	36	37	26^{4}	39	40	41	38^{6}	42	43	44	45	46
Ground	A	H	H	A	A	H	A	A	H	H	A	H	A	A	A	H	A	H	A	H	A	A	H	H	H	A	H	H	A	A	H	H	A	H	A	H	A	H	H	A	A	H	A	H	A	H
Result	L	L	W	D	W	W	W	D	W	W	W	W	W	W	W	W	D	D	W	D	W	L	W	D	L	W	D	W	D	D	W	D	L	W	D	L	W	W	D	L	W	W	W	L	L	L
Position	14	19	16	15	10	9	7	8	5	3	3	2	1	1	1	1	1	1	1	2	2	3	1	2	2	2	2	2	2	2	2	2	2	2	2	3	2	3	3	3	3	3	2	3	4	5
Points	0	0	3	4	7	10	13	14	17	20	23	26	29	32	35	38	39	40	43	44	47	47	50	51	51	54	55	58	59	60	63	64	64	67	68	68	71	74	75	75	78	81	84	84	84	84

Source: EFL
A = Away; H = Home; W = Win; D = Draw; L = Loss; P = Postponed
Notes:
- ^{1} Matchday 5 (v. Mansfield Town) was postponed due to international call-ups.
- ^{2} Matchday 11 (v. Stockport County) was postponed due to international call-ups.
- ^{3} Matchday 16 (v. Huddersfield Town) was postponed due to international call-ups.
- ^{4} Matchday 26 (v. Rotherham United) was postponed due to FA Cup involvements.
- ^{5} Matchday 31 (v. Bristol Rovers) was postponed due to FA Cup involvements.
- ^{6} Matchday 38 (v. Huddersfield Town) was postponed due to international call-ups.

==== Matches ====
The league fixtures were announced on 26 June 2024.

Win Draw Loss Fixtures

10 August 2024 1	Wrexham	3–2	Wycombe Wanderers	Wrexham
17:30 BST	Cleworth 9'; Marriott 29'; Cannon (yellow card) 63'; Dobson (yellow card) 71'; Fletcher 83', (yellow card) 90+2'	Report	Bakinson (yellow card) 27'; Kone 58'; Vokes 89'	Stadium: Racecourse Ground; Attendance: 13,214 (1,091 away); Referee: Ollie Yates

17 August 2024 2	Wycombe Wanderers	2–3	Birmingham City	High Wycombe
15:00 BST	Bielik 6' (o.g.); Harvie (yellow card) 17'; Leahy (yellow card) 30'; Tafazolli (yellow card) 45+2'; Vokes 90'	Report	May (yellow card) 12', (goal) 31'; Cochrane (yellow card) 55'; Harris 68'; Willumsson 82'	Stadium: Adams Park; Attendance: 6,224 (1,848 away); Referee: Lewis Smith

24 August 2024 3	Wycombe Wanderers	2–0	Rotherham United	High Wycombe
15:00 BST	Scowen (yellow card) 8'; Humphreys 70'; Sadlier 87' (pen.)	Report	McCart (yellow card) 23'; Wilks (yellow card) 25'	Stadium: Adams Park; Attendance: 4,272 (552 away); Referee: Carl Brook

31 August 2024 4	Blackpool	2–2	Wycombe Wanderers	Blackpool
12:30 BST	Norburn (yellow card) 21'; Joseph 32'; Evans (yellow card) 44'; Beesley 84'	Report	McCleary 10'; Udoh (yellow card) 13', (goal) 78'	Stadium: Bloomfield Road; Attendance: 9,143 (250 away); Referee: Darren Drysdale
Note: Fixture was initially scheduled for a 15:00 kick-off, but was moved for live Sky Sports broadcast.

14 September 2024 6	Northampton Town	1–2	Wycombe Wanderers	Northampton
12:30 BST	Hoskins 4' (pen.); Brough (yellow card) 43'; Fosu (yellow card) 90+3'	Report	Grimmer (yellow card) 4'; Udoh 11'; Kone 52'; Scowen (yellow card) 61'; Ravizzoli (yellow card) 86'; Lubala (yellow card) 90+3'	Stadium: Sixfields Stadium; Attendance: 5,995 (624 away); Referee: Adam Herczeg
Note: Fixture was initially scheduled for a 15:00 kick-off, but was moved for live Sky Sports broadcast.

21 September 2024 7	Wycombe Wanderers	2–1	Cambridge United	High Wycombe
15:00 GMT	McCleary 8'; Humphreys 85'; Scowen (yellow card) 88'	Report	Kaikai (yellow card) 7'; Nlundulu 19'; Ibsen Rossi (yellow card) 78'	Stadium: Adams Park; Attendance: 4,189 (421 away); Referee: Scott Oldham

28 September 2024 8	Bristol Rovers	1–2	Wycombe Wanderers	Bristol
15:00 GMT	Sinclair 17'; Lindsay (yellow card) 34'; O'Donkor (yellow card) 39'	Report	Harvie (yellow card) 20', (goal) 77'; Low 90+6'; Lubala (yellow card) 90+7'	Stadium: Memorial Stadium; Attendance: 7,814 (631 away); Referee: Martin Woods

1 October 2024 9	Barnsley	2–2	Wycombe Wanderers	Barnsley
19:45 GMT	Humphrys 58'; Jaló (yellow card) 63'; Roberts 89'	Report	Lubala 47'; Taylor (yellow card) 75'; Low (yellow card) 78'; Kone 85', (yellow card) 90+5'	Stadium: Oakwell; Attendance: 9,857 (163 away); Referee: Ross Joyce

5 October 2024 10	Wycombe Wanderers	1–0	Crawley Town	High Wycombe
15:00 BST	Onyedinma 23'; Low (yellow card) 90+6'	Report	Ibrahim (yellow card) 18'; Forster (yellow card) 28'; Camará (yellow card) 83'; Williams (yellow card) 86'; Flint (yellow card) 88'; Showunmi (yellow card) 90+6'	Stadium: Adams Park; Attendance: 4,472 (408 away); Referee: Neil Hair

19 October 2024 12	Wycombe Wanderers	3–1	Peterborough United	High Wycombe
12:30 BST	Kone 63', 67', 72' (pen.); Morley (yellow card) 89'	Report	O'Brien-Brady (yellow card) 32'; Fernandez (yellow card) 39' (yellow-red card) 71'; Jones 50'; Collins (yellow card) 53'; Randall (yellow card) 89'	Stadium: Adams Park; Attendance: 4,345 (497 away); Referee: Lee Swabey
Note: Fixture was initially scheduled for a 15:00 kick-off, but was moved for live Sky Sports broadcast.

22 October 2024 13	Burton Albion	2–3	Wycombe Wanderers	Burton upon Trent
19:45 BST	Sweeney (yellow card) 7'; Orsi 34'; Webster 63'	Report	Scowen (yellow card) 12'; Kodua 16', (yellow card) 49'; Taylor (yellow card) 52'; Leahy 53'; Onyedinma (yellow card) 80'; Udoh 81'	Stadium: Pirelli Stadium; Attendance: 1,993 (300 away); Referee: Aaron Bannister

26 October 2024 14	Wycombe Wanderers	3–0	Leyton Orient	High Wycombe
15:00 BST	Onyedinma 5'; Udoh 45+5'; Humphreys 59'	Report	O'Neill (yellow card) 52'; Cooper (yellow card) 69'	Stadium: Adams Park; Attendance: 5,400 (739 away); Referee: Stephen Martin

5 November 2024 11	Stockport County	0–5	Wycombe Wanderers	Stockport
19:45 GMT	Horsfall (yellow card) 9'; Diamond (yellow card) 21'; Pye (yellow card) 47'	Report	Kone 10' (pen.), 18'; Onyedinma 11', 70'; Morley 77'	Stadium: Edgeley Park; Attendance: 8,305 (274 away); Referee: Matt Corlett
Note: Fixture was initially scheduled for 12 October, but was postponed due to international call-ups in the Stockport squad.

9 November 2024 15	Wigan Athletic	0–1	Wycombe Wanderers	Wigan
15:00 GMT	Robinson (yellow card) 56'; Aimson (yellow card) 63'	Report	Low 11'; Taylor (yellow card) 26'; Scowen (yellow card) 45'	Stadium: Brick Community Stadium; Attendance: 8,958 (416 away); Referee: Bobby Madley

23 November 2024 17	Lincoln City	2–3	Wycombe Wanderers	Lincoln
15:00 GMT	Darikwa 14', 87', (yellow card) 39'; O'Connor (yellow card) 16'; Wickens (yellow card) 76'; House (yellow card) 79'	Report	Taylor (yellow card) 33'; Kone 35'; Onyedinma 43'; Leahy (penalty missed) 65'; Low 72'	Stadium: Sincil Bank; Attendance: 8,558 (484 away); Referee: Seb Stockbridge

26 November 2024 5	Wycombe Wanderers	1–0	Mansfield Town	High Wycombe
19:45 GMT	Low (yellow card) 71'; Leahy 90+3'	Report	Cargill (yellow card) 45+1'	Stadium: Adams Park; Attendance: 4,670 (908 away); Referee: Craig Hicks
Note: Fixture was initially scheduled for 7 September, but was postponed due to international call-ups in the Mansfield squad.

3 December 2024 18	Exeter City	2–2	Wycombe Wanderers	Exeter
19:45 GMT	Alli 2'; McMillan 22'	Report	Low 27', (yellow card) 83'; Humphreys 54'	Stadium: St James Park; Attendance: 5,074 (335 away); Referee: James Durkin

7 December 2024 19	Wycombe Wanderers	1–1	Reading	High Wycombe
15:00 GMT	Lubala 18', (yellow card) 62'; Onyedinma (yellow card) 45+2'; Bakinson (yellow card) 74'; Harvie (yellow card) 90+6'	Report	Knibbs 30'; Pereira (yellow card) 58'; Smith (yellow card) 65'	Stadium: Adams Park; Attendance: 7,651 (1,843 away); Referee: David Rock

14 December 2024 20	Shrewsbury Town	1–4	Wycombe Wanderers	Shrewsbury
15:00 GMT	Rossiter (yellow card) 67'; Shipley 72'	Report	Lubala 30', (yellow card) 35'; Harvie (yellow card) 34'; Taylor 45+2'; Udoh (yellow card) 66', (goal) 74'; Onyedinma 69'; Pattenden (yellow card) 73'	Stadium: New Meadow; Attendance: 5,737 (534 away); Referee: Martin Coy

20 December 2024 21	Wycombe Wanderers	0–0	Bolton Wanderers	High Wycombe
19:45 GMT	Hartridge (yellow card) 82'	Report	Matete (yellow card) 65'; Lolos (yellow card) 75'; Williams (yellow card) 90+2'	Stadium: Adams Park; Attendance: 6,119 (770 away); Referee: Stephen Martin
Note: Fixture was initially scheduled for 21 December, but was moved following an agreement between the two sides.

26 December 2024 22	Stevenage	0–3	Wycombe Wanderers	Stevenage
15:00 GMT	Phillips (yellow card) 45'; Kemp (yellow card) 75'; List (yellow card) 77'	Report	Kone 8', 43'; Lubala 66'	Stadium: Broadhall Way; Attendance: 4,430 (875 away); Referee: Paul Howard

29 December 2024 23	Charlton Athletic	2–1	Wycombe Wanderers	Charlton
12:30 GMT	Leaburn 46', 52', (yellow card) 71'	Report	Bakinson (yellow card) 37'; Kone 84'	Stadium: The Valley; Attendance: 15,544 (1,457 away); Referee: Lee Swabey
Note: Fixture was initially scheduled for a 15:00 kick-off, but was moved for live Sky Sports broadcast.

1 January 2025 24	Wycombe Wanderers	2–1	Exeter City	High Wycombe
15:00 GMT	Leahy 66'; Morley 90+4' (pen.)	Report	Harper (yellow card) 22'; Magennis (yellow card) 39'; Woods (yellow card) 65'; Crama (yellow card) 77', (goal) 86'	Stadium: Adams Park; Attendance: 5,829 (630 away); Referee: Scott Simpson

4 January 2025 25	Wycombe Wanderers	1–1	Blackpool	High Wycombe
15:00 GMT	Scowen (yellow card) 19'; Hartridge (yellow card) 26' (yellow-red card) 55'; Kone 40' (pen.); Low (yellow card) 53'	Report	Husband (yellow card) 49'; Coulson (yellow card) 90'; Joseph 90+3'	Stadium: Adams Park; Attendance: 4,936 (445 away); Referee: Simon Mather

7 January 2025 16	Wycombe Wanderers	0–1	Huddersfield Town	High Wycombe
19:45 GMT		Report	Kane 15'; Koroma (yellow card) 21'; Lees (yellow card) 67'; Hogg (yellow card) 78'	Stadium: Adams Park; Attendance: 4,035 (552 away); Referee: Thomas Kirk
Note: Fixture was initially scheduled for 16 November, but was postponed due to international call-ups in the Huddersfield squad.

18 January 2025 27	Mansfield Town	1–2	Wycombe Wanderers	Mansfield
15:00 GMT	Cargill (yellow card) 31'; Akins 68'	Report	Kone 57'; Onyedinma (yellow card) 62'; McCleary 87'	Stadium: Field Mill; Attendance: 7,459 (574 away); Referee: Sam Purkiss

25 January 2025 28	Wycombe Wanderers	0–0	Northampton Town	High Wycombe
15:00 GMT		Report	McGowan (yellow card) 15'; Taylor (yellow card) 45'	Stadium: Adams Park; Attendance: 5,446 (587 away); Referee: David Rock

28 January 2025 29	Wycombe Wanderers	2–1	Barnsley	High Wycombe
19:45 GMT	Leahy (yellow card) 5'; Bakinson (yellow card) 50'; Kone 65' (pen.), 90+5'; Lubala (yellow card) 90+10'	Report	Russell 10'; O'Keeffe (yellow card) 59'; Killip (yellow card) 62'; Roberts (red card) 66'; Humphrys (yellow card) 75'; Connell (yellow card) 90+9'	Stadium: Adams Park; Attendance: 3,803 (226 away); Referee: Darren Drysdale

1 February 2025 30	Cambridge United	1–1	Wycombe Wanderers	Cambridge
15:00 GMT	Digby (yellow card) 1'; Bennett (yellow card) 39'; Stokes (penalty missed) 66', 83'; Kachunga (yellow card) 83'	Report	Humphreys 35'; Bradley (red card) 64'	Stadium: Abbey Stadium; Attendance: 6,866 (865 away); Referee: Martin Woods

15 February 2025 32	Crawley Town	1–1	Wycombe Wanderers	Crawley
15:00 GMT	Swan 5'; Ibrahim (yellow card) 55'	Report	Udoh 20'; Low (yellow card) 22'; McCleary (yellow card) 83'	Stadium: Broadfield Stadium; Attendance: 4,330 (1,019 away); Referee: Farai Hallam

18 February 2025 31	Wycombe Wanderers	2–0	Bristol Rovers	High Wycombe
19:45 GMT	Humphreys 51'; Udoh 59'; Harvie (yellow card) 89'	Report	Senior (yellow card) 26'; Forde (red card) 82'	Stadium: Adams Park; Attendance: 4,419 (419 away); Referee: Sam Purkiss
Note: Fixture was initially scheduled for 8 February, but was rearranged due to FA Cup involvements.

22 February 2025 33	Wycombe Wanderers	0–0	Wigan Athletic	High Wycombe
15:00 GMT	Pattenden (yellow card) 63'; Simons (yellow card) 87'; Leahy (yellow card) 90+2'	Report	Sibbick (yellow card) 85'	Stadium: Adams Park; Attendance: 5,445 (446 away); Referee: Leigh Doughty

1 March 2025 34	Birmingham City	1–0	Wycombe Wanderers	Birmingham
12:30 GMT	Gardner-Hickman 21'	Report	Simons (red card) 45+2'; Kone (yellow card) 90+8'	Stadium: St Andrew's; Attendance: 27,522 (1,930 away); Referee: Ben Toner
Note: Fixture was initially scheduled for a 15:00 kick-off, but was moved for live Sky Sports broadcast.

4 March 2025 35	Wycombe Wanderers	2–0	Burton Albion	High Wycombe
20:00 GMT	Udoh 16'; Kone (yellow card) 44'; Armer 59' (o.g.)	Report	Dodgson (yellow card) 90+2'	Stadium: Adams Park; Attendance: 3,456 (114 away); Referee: Alex Chilowicz
Note: Fixture was initially scheduled for a 19:45 kick-off, but was moved for live Sky Sports broadcast.

8 March 2025 36	Peterborough United	1–1	Wycombe Wanderers	Peterborough
15:00 GMT	Mothersille 16' (pen.); Ihionvien (yellow card) 30'	Report	Kone 90+3'	Stadium: London Road Stadium; Attendance: 8,260 (629 away); Referee: Scott Oldham

15 March 2025 37	Wycombe Wanderers	0–1	Wrexham	High Wycombe
15:00 GMT		Report	Rathbone (yellow card) 37'; Smith 78'; O'Connor (yellow card) 90+5'	Stadium: Adams Park; Attendance: 9,333 (1,816 away); Referee: Ben Speedie

18 March 2025 26	Rotherham United	2–3	Wycombe Wanderers	Rotherham
17:45 GMT	Sibley 66'; Clarke-Harris 90+5' (pen.)	Report	Bradley (yellow card) 52', (goal) 90'; Low (yellow card) 61'; Kone 69'; Kodua 90+2'	Stadium: New York Stadium; Attendance: 7,798 (218 away); Referee: Simon Mather
Note: Fixture was initially scheduled for a 15:00 kick-off on 11 January, but was moved to 12:30 for live Sky Sports broadcast, and later postponed due to Wycombe's FA Cup progression.

29 March 2025 39	Wycombe Wanderers	1–0	Lincoln City	High Wycombe
15:00 GMT	Humphreys 66'; Leahy (yellow card) 90+2'	Report	Makama (yellow card) 16'; Bayliss (yellow card) 51'; O'Connor (red card) 90+4'	Stadium: Adams Park; Attendance: 4,939 (341 away); Referee: Scott Jackson

1 April 2025 40	Wycombe Wanderers	0–0	Shrewsbury Town	High Wycombe
19:45 BST	Simons (yellow card) 42'; Lowry (yellow card) 51'; Leahy (yellow card) 83'	Report	Benning (yellow card) 35'; Blackman (yellow card) 55'; Feeney (yellow card) 90+2'	Stadium: Adams Park; Attendance: 3,806 (143 away); Referee: Tom Nield

5 April 2025 41	Reading	1–0	Wycombe Wanderers	Reading
12:30 BST	Mbengue (yellow card) 33'; Knibbs (yellow card) 36', (goal) 77' (pen.); Wareham (yellow card) 90+3'	Report	Simons (yellow card) 33'; Kone (yellow card) 36'; Lowry (yellow card) 89'; Grimmer (yellow card) 90+7'	Stadium: Madejski Stadium; Attendance: 15,228 (1,652 away); Referee: Thomas Kirk
Note: Fixture was initially scheduled for a 15:00 kick-off, but was moved for live Sky Sports broadcast.

8 April 2025 38	Huddersfield Town	0–1	Wycombe Wanderers	Huddersfield
19:45 BST	Sørensen (yellow card) 79'; Ruffels (yellow card) 80'	Report	Bradley (yellow card) 15'; Udoh 63'	Stadium: Kirklees Stadium; Attendance: 17,297; Referee: Scott Oldham
Note: Fixture was initially scheduled for 22 March, but was moved due to international call-ups in the Huddersfield squad.

12 April 2025 42	Wycombe Wanderers	1–0	Stevenage	High Wycombe
12:30 BST	Taylor 90+1'	Report	Phillips (yellow card) 41'	Stadium: Adams Park; Attendance: 4,827 (332 away); Referee: Josh Smith
Note: Fixture was initially scheduled for a 15:00 kick-off, but was moved for live Sky Sports broadcast.

18 April 2025 43	Bolton Wanderers	0–2	Wycombe Wanderers	Bolton
15:00 BST	Matete (yellow card) 57'; Johnston (yellow card) 68'	Report	Taylor 58'; Grimmer (yellow card) 68'; Leahy (yellow card) 80', (goal) 90+4'	Stadium: Toughsheet Community Stadium; Attendance: 21,114 (569 away); Referee: Adam Herczeg

21 April 2025 44	Wycombe Wanderers	0–4	Charlton Athletic	High Wycombe
15:00 BST	Grimmer (yellow card) 64'	Report	Jones (yellow card) 3', (goal) 11'; Berry 24'; Edwards (yellow card) 37'; Godden 58'; Anderson 62'; Aneke (red card) 90+3'	Stadium: Adams Park; Attendance: 8,084 (1,849 away); Referee: Will Finnie

26 April 2025 45	Leyton Orient	1–0	Wycombe Wanderers	Leyton
12:30 BST	Galbraith (yellow card) 28'; Williams 66'; Pratley (yellow card) 75'	Report	Lowry (yellow card) 60'	Stadium: Brisbane Road; Attendance: 8,935; Referee: Martin Coy
Note: Fixture was originally scheduled for a 15:00 kick-off, but was moved for live Sky Sports broadcast.

3 May 2025 46	Wycombe Wanderers	1–3	Stockport County	High Wycombe
15:00 BST	McCleary 31'; Leahy (penalty missed) 60'; Grimmer (yellow card) 73'	Report	Andrésson 70'; Norwood 77' (pen.); Collar 81', (yellow card) 86'	Stadium: Adams Park; Attendance: 7,561 (1,588 away); Referee: Ben Toner

=== EFL Playoffs ===
11 May 2025 Semi-final First Leg	Wycombe Wanderers	0–0	Charlton Athletic	High Wycombe
18:30 BST	Kone (yellow card) 37'; Simons (yellow card) 45+1'	Report	Docherty (yellow card) 45+2'	Stadium: Adams Park; Attendance: 6,585; Referee: Farai Hallam

15 May 2024 Semi-final Second Leg	Charlton Athletic	1–0 (1–0 agg.)	Wycombe Wanderers	Charlton
20:00 BST	Docherty (yellow card) 44'; Godden 81', (yellow card) 90'	Report		Stadium: The Valley; Attendance: 25,722; Referee: Dean Whitestone

=== FA Cup ===
Wycombe Wanderers were drawn at home to York City in the first round, away to Wealdstone in the second round, at home to Portsmouth in the third round and away to Preston North End in the fourth round.

Win Draw Loss Fixtures

2 November 2024 First round	Wycombe Wanderers	3–2	York City	High Wycombe
15:00 GMT	Leahy 14' (pen.), 57', (yellow card) 50'; Kodua 21'	Report	Sinclair 31'; Felix (yellow card) 43', (goal) 90+4'	Stadium: Adams Park; Attendance: 2,765 (580 away); Referee: Tom Reeves

30 November 2024 Second round	Wealdstone	0–2	Wycombe Wanderers	Ruislip
11:30 GMT	Kretzschmar (yellow card) 80'; Mariappa (yellow card) 82'	Report	Lubala 29', (yellow card) 50'; Kone 84'; Morley (yellow card) 90'	Stadium: Grosvenor Vale; Attendance: 3,534; Referee: Alex Chilowicz

10 January 2025 Third round	Wycombe Wanderers	2–0	Portsmouth	High Wycombe
19:45 GMT	Hanlan 17'; Bradley 27'; Harvie (yellow card) 63'	Report	Saydee (yellow card) 63'; Devlin (yellow card) 90+3'	Stadium: Adams Park; Attendance: 5,240 (1,569 away); Referee: Tom Reeves

8 February 2025 Fourth round	Preston North End	0–0 (a.e.t.) (4–2 p)	Wycombe Wanderers	Preston
15:00 GMT	Osmajić (yellow card) 45'; Ledson (yellow card) 90+4'	Report	Onyedinma (yellow card) 26'; Bakinson (yellow card) 110'	Stadium: Deepdale; Attendance: 10,444 (974 away); Referee: Benjamin Speedie
	Penalties
	Greenwood (penalty scored); Osmajić (penalty scored); Frøkjær-Jensen (penalty scored); McCann (penalty missed); Evans (penalty scored)		(penalty scored) Lubala; (penalty missed) Udoh; (penalty missed) Reach; (penalty scored) Scowen

=== EFL Cup ===
On 27 June, the draw for the first round was made, with Wycombe being drawn at home against Northampton Town. In the second round, they were drawn away to Swansea City. In the third round, a home tie against Aston Villa was confirmed.

Win Draw Loss Fixtures

13 August 2024 First round	Northampton Town	0–2	Wycombe Wanderers	Northampton
19:45 BST	Pinnock (yellow card) 90+7'	Report	Udoh 9'; Mbete 45+1' (o.g.); Hartridge (yellow card) 25' (yellow-red card) 78'	Stadium: Sixfields Stadium; Attendance: 2,012 (273 away); Referee: Declan Bourne

28 August 2024 Second round	Swansea City	0–1	Wycombe Wanderers	Swansea
19:45 BST	Bianchini (yellow card) 36'	Report	Kone 40'; Harvie (yellow card) 85'; Hartridge (yellow card) 86'	Stadium: Swansea.com Stadium; Attendance: 6,000 (200 away); Referee: Ben Toner

24 September 2024 Third round	Wycombe Wanderers	1–2	Aston Villa	High Wycombe
20:00 BST	Bakinson (yellow card) 53'; Kone 90+5'	Report	Buendía 55'; Durán 85' (pen.)	Stadium: Adams Park; Attendance: 8,158 (1,838 away); Referee: John Busby

=== EFL Trophy ===
==== Group stage ====
In the group stage, Wycombe were drawn into Southern Group B alongside AFC Wimbledon, Crawley Town and Brighton & Hove Albion U21.

Pos	Div	Team	Pld	W	PW	PL	L	GF	GA	GD	Pts	Qualification
1	L1	Wycombe Wanderers	3	2	0	0	1	7	5	+2	6	Advance to Round 2
2	L2	AFC Wimbledon	3	2	0	0	1	5	6	−1	6	Advance to Round 2
3	ACA	Brighton & Hove Albion U21	3	1	0	1	1	8	7	+1	4	
4	L1	Crawley Town	3	0	1	0	2	6	8	−2	2	

Source: EFL

Win Draw Loss Fixtures

20 August 2024 1	AFC Wimbledon	1–0	Wycombe Wanderers	Wimbledon
19:45 BST	Bugiel 84'; Sutcliffe (yellow card) 90+3'	Report		Stadium: Plough Lane; Attendance: 1,542 (174 away); Referee: Scott Tallis

17 September 2024 2	Wycombe Wanderers	5–3	Brighton & Hove Albion U21	High Wycombe
19:00 BST	Lubala 13', 30', 36', 50'; Sadlier 27'; Harvie (yellow card) 79'; Hartridge (yellow card) 82'	Report	Knight (yellow card) 41'; Howell 45+3' (pen.), 80' (pen.); Albarus (yellow card) 48'; Ifill 56'; Moulton (yellow card) 87'	Stadium: Adams Park; Attendance: 487 (60 away); Referee: Ben Atkinson
Note: Fixture was initially scheduled for 24 September, but was brought forward a week due to EFL Cup involvements.

12 November 2024 3	Wycombe Wanderers	2–1	Crawley Town	High Wycombe
19:00 GMT	Hanlan 4'; Leahy 30', (penalty missed) 53'; Hartridge (yellow card) 32'; Kone (yellow card) 90+7'	Report	Showunmi 14'; Tanimu (yellow card) 52'; Roles (yellow card) 81'; Ibrahim (yellow card) 90+7'	Stadium: Adams Park; Attendance: 723 (84 away); Referee: Scott Jackson

==== Knockout stage ====
In the round of 32, Wycombe were drawn at home to League Two side Swindon Town.

10 December 2024 Round of 32	Wycombe Wanderers	1–2	Swindon Town	High Wycombe
19:00 GMT	Butcher (yellow card) 62'; Lubala 90+3'	Report	Kirkman 5'; Longelo (red card) 45+1'; Tshimanga 68'; Delaney (yellow card) 74'	Stadium: Adams Park; Attendance: 611 (198 away); Referee: Farai Hallam

=== Berks & Bucks Senior Cup ===
Wycombe were drawn against Beaconsfield Town in the Quarter Finals of the Berks & Bucks Senior Cup.

14 January 2025 Quarter-finals	Beaconsfield Town	4–3	Wycombe Wanderers	Beaconsfield
19:45 GMT	Oke-William 2'; Marcon 10' (pen.); Lawal 41', 86'	Report	Cole 32', 87'; Peart 70'	Stadium: Holloways Park; Attendance: 324; Referee: Mudiwa Manyange

== Statistics ==
=== Appearances and goals ===
As of match played 26 April 2025

Players with no appearances are not included on the list, Italics indicate a loaned in player

No.	Pos	Nat	Player	Total		League One		FA Cup		EFL Cup		EFL Trophy	
No.	Pos	Nat	Player	Apps	Goals	Apps	Goals	Apps	Goals	Apps	Goals	Apps	Goals
1	GK	(Argentina) ARG	Franco Ravizzoli	30	0	27+0	0	0+0	0	2+0	0	1+0	0
2	DF	(Scotland) SCO	Jack Grimmer	40	0	31+5	0	1+0	0	0+1	0	1+1	0
3	DF	(Scotland) SCO	Daniel Harvie	35	1	30+0	1	2+0	0	1+1	0	0+1	0
4	MF	(England) ENG	Josh Scowen	46	0	34+4	0	1+2	0	2+1	0	0+2	0
5	DF	(England) ENG	Alex Hartridge	14	0	5+1	0	2+0	0	3+0	0	3+0	0
6	DF	(England) ENG	Ryan Tafazolli	5	0	1+0	0	1+0	0	1+0	0	2+0	0
7	MF	(England) ENG	Xavier Simons	13	0	11+2	0	0+0	0	0+0	0	0+0	0
8	MF	(England) ENG	Matt Butcher	23	0	3+10	0	3+0	0	3+0	0	4+0	0
9	FW	(Wales) WAL	Sam Vokes	8	2	0+6	2	0+0	0	0+1	0	1+0	0
10	MF	(England) ENG	Luke Leahy	47	7	29+9	4	3+1	2	1+1	0	2+1	1
11	FW	(Nigeria) NGR	Daniel Udoh	48	10	26+14	9	1+2	0	1+1	1	2+1	0
12	FW	(Jamaica) JAM	Garath McCleary	49	3	23+19	3	2+1	0	0+3	0	1+0	0
16	MF	(England) ENG	Tyreeq Bakinson	33	0	10+14	0	4+0	0	3+0	0	2+0	0
17	DF	(Wales) WAL	Joe Low	42	4	36+2	4	1+0	0	3+0	0	0+0	0
18	FW	(England) ENG	Brandon Hanlan	13	2	1+7	0	2+1	1	0+0	0	2+0	1
19	GK	(England) ENG	Shamal George	5	0	0+0	0	3+0	0	0+0	0	2+0	0
20	MF	(England) ENG	Cameron Humphreys	48	7	40+2	7	0+1	0	0+2	0	2+1	0
21	MF	(England) ENG	Gideon Kodua	24	3	2+18	2	2+1	1	1+0	0	0+0	0
23	FW	(Republic of Ireland) IRL	Kieran Sadlier	13	2	5+4	1	0+0	0	2+0	0	2+0	1
24	FW	(Ivory Coast) CIV	Richard Kone	50	21	32+9	18	1+2	1	2+1	2	0+3	0
25	DF	(England) ENG	Declan Skura	18	0	5+3	0	4+0	0	2+0	0	4+0	0
26	DF	(England) ENG	Sonny Bradley	18	2	15+1	1	2+0	1	0+0	0	0+0	0
29	FW	(Gibraltar) GIB	Jaiden Bartolo	4	0	0+2	0	0+0	0	0+0	0	1+1	0
30	FW	(Democratic Republic of the Congo) COD	Beryly Lubala	35	10	13+14	4	4+0	1	1+0	0	2+1	5
31	DF	(England) ENG	Jasper Pattenden	19	0	10+3	0	1+0	0	3+0	0	2+0	0
32	MF	(England) ENG	Taylor Clark	1	0	0+0	0	0+0	0	0+0	0	0+1	0
33	DF	(England) ENG	Luca Woodhouse	1	0	0+0	0	0+0	0	0+0	0	1+0	0
35	MF	(England) ENG	Christie Ward	1	0	0+0	0	0+0	0	0+0	0	0+1	0
36	FW	(England) ENG	Jahiem Dotse	1	0	0+0	0	0+0	0	0+0	0	0+1	0
37	DF	(England) ENG	Caleb Taylor	36	3	34+1	3	0+0	0	0+0	0	1+0	0
38	FW	(England) ENG	James Berry	3	0	0+3	0	0+0	0	0+0	0	0+0	0
41	MF	(England) ENG	Adam Reach	12	0	6+5	0	0+1	0	0+0	0	0+0	0
42	MF	(Denmark) DEN	Magnus Westergaard	5	0	0+4	0	0+1	0	0+0	0	0+0	0
43	DF	(England) ENG	Fin Back	1	0	1+0	0	0+0	0	0+0	0	0+0	0
44	MF	(Nigeria) NGR	Fred Onyedinma	43	6	27+11	6	1+2	0	0+1	0	0+1	0
45	DF	(Denmark) DEN	Anders Hagelskjær	2	0	0+2	0	0+0	0	0+0	0	0+0	0
47	MF	(Scotland) SCO	Alex Lowry	9	0	1+7	0	1+0	0	0+0	0	0+0	0
50	GK	(England) ENG	Will Norris	17	0	16+0	0	1+0	0	0+0	0	0+0	0
Player(s) who featured whilst on loan but returned to parent club during the season:
22	GK	(England) ENG	Nathan Bishop	5	0	2+0	0	0+1	0	1+0	0	1+0	0
28	MF	(England) ENG	Aaron Morley	23	2	18+1	2	0+1	0	0+0	0	1+2	0
Player(s) who featured but departed the club permanently during the season:
26	DF	(England) ENG	Jason McCarthy	7	0	0+2	0	0+1	0	0+1	0	2+1	0
7	MF	(England) ENG	David Wheeler	12	0	1+4	0	1+2	0	1+0	0	2+1	0
