= 2023–24 Wycombe Wanderers F.C. season =

137th season in existence of Wycombe Wanderers FC

Wycombe Wanderers
2023–24 season
- Owner: Feliciana EFL Ltd (90%); Wycombe Wanderers Supporters' Trust (10%)
- Chairman: Rob Couhig
- Manager: Matt Bloomfield
- Stadium: Adams Park
- League One: 10th
- FA Cup: Second round
- EFL Cup: Second round
- EFL Trophy: Final
- Top goalscorer: League: Luke Leahy (7); All: Luke Leahy (8)
- Highest home attendance: 7,073 vs. Reading; 25 November 2023
- Lowest home attendance: 424 vs. Crystal Palace U21; 19 September 2023
- Average home league attendance: 4,929
- Biggest win: 4-1 vs. Fleetwood Town; 7 October 2023
- Biggest defeat: 3-0 (twice) (vs. Exeter City, 5 August 2023) (vs. Lincoln City, 12 August 2023)
Home colours	Away colours	Third colours

The 2023–24 season is the 137th season in the history of Wycombe Wanderers and their 31st consecutive season in the Football League. The club will be participating in League One for the third consecutive season, as well as the FA Cup, the EFL Cup, and the EFL Trophy.

== Current squad ==
As of 28 February 2024

No.	Name	Position	Nationality	Place of birth	Date of birth (age)	Previous club	Date signed	Fee	Contract end
Goalkeepers
1	Max Stryjek	GK	(Poland)	Warsaw	18 July 1996 (age 30)	(Scotland) Livingston	18 August 2022	Free	30 June 2024
25	Franco Ravizzoli	GK	(Argentina)	Mar del Plata	9 July 1997 (age 29)	Milton Keynes Dons	14 September 2023	Free	30 June 2024
29	Nathan Shepperd	GK	(Wales)		10 September 2000 (age 26)	(Republic of Ireland) Dundalk	27 February 2024	Free	30 June 2024
Defenders
2	Jack Grimmer	RB	(Scotland)	Aberdeen	25 January 1994 (age 32)	Coventry City	22 July 2019	Free	30 June 2024
3	Joe Jacobson	LB	(Wales)	Cardiff	17 November 1986 (age 39)	Shrewsbury Town	1 July 2014	Free	30 June 2024
5	Chris Forino-Joseph	CB	(Saint Lucia)	(England) Islington	26 April 2000 (age 26)	Loughborough University	1 July 2021	Free	30 June 2024
6	Ryan Tafazolli	CB	(England)	Sutton	28 September 1991 (age 35)	Hull City	2 September 2020	Free	30 June 2024
10	Luke Leahy	LB	(England)	Coventry	19 November 1992 (age 33)	Shrewsbury Town	11 July 2023	Undisclosed	30 June 2026
16	Saxon Earley	LB	(England)		11 October 2002 (age 24)	Plymouth Argyle	1 February 2024	Loan	31 May 2024
17	Joe Low	CB	(Wales)	(England) Filton	20 February 2002 (age 24)	Bristol City	18 July 2023	Undisclosed	30 June 2025
22	Nigel Lonwijk	CB	(Netherlands)	Goirle	27 October 2002 (age 24)	Wolverhampton Wanderers	1 February 2024	Loan	31 May 2024
26	Jason McCarthy	RB	(England)	Southampton	7 November 1995 (age 31)	Millwall	25 August 2020	Undisclosed	30 June 2024
31	Jasper Pattenden	RB	(England)	Rustington	15 April 2002 (age 24)	Worthing	1 July 2022	Undisclosed	30 June 2025
40	Max Cavana	CB	(United States)	Baton Rouge		Academy	5 September 2023	Trainee	30 June
44	Kane Vincent-Young	RB	(England)	Camden	15 March 1996 (age 30)	Ipswich Town	13 July 2023	Free	30 June 2025
Midfielders
4	Josh Scowen	CM	(England)	Cheshunt	28 March 1993 (age 33)	Sunderland	1 July 2021	Free	30 June 2025
7	David Wheeler	RM	(England)	Brighton	4 October 1990 (age 36)	Queens Park Rangers	30 July 2019	Free	30 June 2024
8	Matt Butcher	DM	(England)	Portsmouth	14 May 1997 (age 29)	Plymouth Argyle	31 January 2024	Free	30 June 2026
11	Chem Campbell	AM	(Wales)	(England) Birmingham	30 December 2002 (age 23)	Wolverhampton Wanderers	16 January 2024	Loan	31 May 2024
19	Freddie Potts	CM	(England)	Barking	20 September 2003 (age 23)	West Ham United	28 July 2023	Loan	31 May 2024
32	Taylor Clark	CM	(England)		17 May 2005 (age 21)	Needham Market	25 August 2023	Free	30 June 2024
Forwards
9	Sam Vokes	CF	(Wales)	(England) Southampton	21 October 1989 (age 37)	Stoke City	28 July 2021	Undisclosed	30 June 2024
12	Garath McCleary	RW	(Jamaica)	(England) Oxford	15 May 1987 (age 39)	Reading	4 November 2020	Free	30 June 2024
18	Brandon Hanlan	CF	(England)	Chelsea	31 May 1997 (age 29)	Bristol Rovers	26 August 2021	Undisclosed	30 June 2025
20	Dale Taylor	CF	(Northern Ireland)	Belfast	12 December 2003 (age 22)	Nottingham Forest	23 July 2023	Loan	31 May 2024
23	Kieran Sadlier	LW	(Republic of Ireland)	(England) Haywards Heath	14 September 1994 (age 32)	Bolton Wanderers	4 September 2023	Free	30 June 2024
24	Richard Kone	CF	(Ivory Coast)	Abidjan	15 July 2003 (age 23)	Athletic Newham	1 January 2024	Undisclosed	30 June 2024
28	Gideon Kodua	CF	(England)	Newham	2 October 2004 (age 22)	West Ham United	12 January 2024	Loan	31 May 2024
30	Beryly Lubala	LW	(Democratic Republic of the Congo)		8 January 1998 (age 28)	Burton Albion	30 January 2024	Free	30 June 2025
Out on Loan
13	Laurence Shala	GK	(Kosovo)	(England) London	11 September 2004 (age 22)	Crystal Palace	21 July 2023	Free	30 June 2024
15	Jack Young	CM	(England)	Morpeth	21 October 2000 (age 26)	Newcastle United	1 July 2022	Undisclosed	30 June 2025
21	D'Mani Mellor	CF	(England)	Manchester	20 September 2000 (age 26)	Manchester United	4 July 2022	Free	30 June 2024
33	Luca Woodhouse	CM	(England)		25 July 2004 (age 22)	Tonbridge Angels	16 August 2022	Undisclosed	30 June 2024
34	Jack Wakely	CB	(England)	High Wycombe	25 October 2000 (age 26)	Chelsea	28 July 2021	Free	30 June 2024
35	Christie Ward	AM	(England)	Poole	9 November 2003 (age 23)	Brockenhurst	12 July 2022	Free	30 June 2024
39	Declan Skura	CB	(England)		9 April 2002 (age 24)	Kingstonian	3 February 2023	Free	30 June 2024

== Pre-season and friendlies ==
On 6 June, Wycombe Wanderers announced their first two pre-season fixtures, against Aldershot Town and Wealdstone. Three days later, a third friendly was confirmed by the club against Cardiff City to celebrate Joe Jacobson's tenth year with the Chairboys. On 10 July, a behind closed doors friendly against Dagenham & Redbridge was confirmed.

Win Draw Loss Fixtures

14 July 2023 Friendly	Arsenal U21	0–1	Wycombe Wanderers	London Colney
12:00 BST		Report	Mellor	Stadium: Arsenal Training Centre; Attendance: 0 (behind closed doors)

14 July 2023 Friendly	Hanwell Town	7–0	Wycombe Wanderers XI	Perivale
19:45 BST				Stadium: Reynolds Field

18 July 2023 Friendly	Dagenham & Redbridge	1–1	Wycombe Wanderers	High Wycombe
12:00 BST		Report	De Barr	Stadium: Marlow Road Training Ground; Attendance: 0 (behind closed doors)

22 July 2023 Friendly	Aldershot Town	1–2	Wycombe Wanderers	Aldershot
15:00 BST	Frost 79'	Report	Mellor 25'; Kone 64'	Stadium: EBB Stadium; Attendance: 839 (120 away)

25 July 2023 Friendly	Wealdstone	0–1	Wycombe Wanderers	Ruislip
19:30 BST		Report	McCleary 42'	Stadium: Grosvenor Vale

29 July 2023 Joe Jacobson's Testimonial	Wycombe Wanderers	0–0	Cardiff City	High Wycombe
15:00 BST		Report		Stadium: Adams Park; Attendance: 2,837 (877 away); Referee: Charles Breakspear

31 July 2023 Friendly	Wycombe Wanderers	1–0	Maidenhead United	High Wycombe
12:00 BST	McCleary	Report		Stadium: Marlow Road Training Ground; Attendance: 0 (behind closed doors)

== Competitions ==
=== Overall record ===
Competition	First match	Last match	Starting round	Final position	Record							
Competition	First match	Last match	Starting round	Final position	Pld	W	D	L	GF	GA	GD	Win %
League One	5 August 2023	26 April 2024	Matchday 1	10th	46	17	14	15	60	55	+5	36.96
FA Cup	4 November 2023	2 December 2023	First round	Second round	2	1	0	1	2	3	−1	50.00
EFL Cup	8 August 2023	29 August 2023	First round	Second round	2	1	0	1	2	1	+1	50.00
EFL Trophy	19 September 2023	7 April 2024	Group stage	Runners-up	8	7	0	1	14	6	+8	87.50
Total					58	26	14	18	78	65	+13	44.83

Last updated: 26 April 2024
Source: Soccerway

=== League One ===
==== League table ====
Pos	Team	Pld	W	D	L	GF	GA	GD	Pts
7	Lincoln City	46	20	14	12	65	40	+25	74
8	Blackpool	46	21	10	15	65	48	+17	73
9	Stevenage	46	19	14	13	57	46	+11	71
10	Wycombe Wanderers	46	17	14	15	60	55	+5	65
11	Leyton Orient	46	18	11	17	53	55	−2	65
12	Wigan Athletic	46	20	10	16	63	56	+7	62 (Note: On 19 May 2023, Wigan Athletic were deducted four points for failing to pay players and staff on time following previous EFL rules breaches in the 2022–23 season. Another four-point deduction was applied on 26 May, after the club's owners missed a deadline to deposit an amount equalling 125% of its monthly wage bill.)
13	Exeter City	46	17	10	19	46	61	−15	61

Source: EFL Official Website
Rules for classification: 1) Points; 2) Goal difference; 3) Number of goals scored; 4) Head-to-head results; 5) Wins; 6) Away goals; 7) Penalty points (sec 9.5); 8) 12-point sending off offences

==== Results summary ====
Overall								Home						Away					
Pld	W	D	L	GF	GA	GD	Pts	W	D	L	GF	GA	GD	W	D	L	GF	GA	GD
46	17	14	15	60	55	+5	65	9	7	7	31	28	+3	8	7	8	29	27	+2

Last updated: 23 April 2024.
Source: Soccerway

==== Results by round ====
Round	1	2	3	4	5	6	8	9	10	11	12	14	15	16	7^{1}	17	19	20	21	22	23	24	25	26	27	28	18^{3}	30	31	32	33	34	35	13^{2}	36	37	38	39	41	42	43	44	29^{4}	45	40^{5}	46
Ground	H	A	H	H	A	A	H	A	H	A	A	A	H	A	H	H	H	A	H	A	H	A	A	H	A	H	A	H	A	H	A	H	A	H	H	A	H	H	A	A	H	A	A	A	A	H
Result	L	L	W	D	W	W	W	L	W	L	W	D	L	D	D	L	L	L	L	D	D	L	D	W	D	D	L	D	W	W	L	D	L	W	L	W	W	W	L	D	D	W	W	W	D	W
Position	22	23	17	17	14	10	8	11	9	7	7	8	10	10	10	12	13	14	15	16	17	18	19	16	16	14	17	19	15	15	15	15	15	14	14	15	14	12	13	13	14	14	12	10	10	10
Points	0	0	3	4	7	10	13	13	16	16	19	20	20	21	22	22	22	22	22	23	24	24	25	28	29	30	30	31	34	37	37	38	38	41	41	44	47	50	50	51	52	55	58	61	62	65

Source: Soccerway
A = Away; H = Home; W = Win; D = Draw; L = Loss
Notes:
- ^{1} Matchday 7 (vs Cambridge United) was postponed due to the international call-ups.
- ^{2} Matchday 13 (vs Cheltenham Town) was postponed due to the international call-ups.
- ^{3} Matchday 18 (vs Wigan Athletic) was postponed due to the international call-ups.
- ^{4} Matchday 29 (vs Port Vale) was postponed due to a frozen pitch.
- ^{5} Matchday 40 (vs Cambridge United) was postponed due to the international call-ups.

==== Matches ====
On 22 June, the EFL League One fixtures were released.

Win Draw Loss Fixtures

5 August 2023 1	Wycombe Wanderers	0–3	Exeter City	High Wycombe
15:00 BST	Boyes (yellow card) 18'; Vincent-Young (yellow card) 33'	Report	Aitchison 1'; Aimson 4', (yellow card) 11'; Nombe (penalty missed) 9'; Sweeney (yellow card) 58'; Scott 83'	Stadium: Adams Park; Attendance: 5,369 (766 away); Referee: Charles Breakspear

12 August 2023 2	Lincoln City	3–0	Wycombe Wanderers	Lincoln
15:00 BST	Hamilton (yellow card) 59'; Hackett-Fairchild 68', (yellow card) 84'; Bishop 73'; Mandroiu 85'	Report	Potts (yellow card) 55'; Scowen (yellow card) 80'	Stadium: Sincil Bank; Attendance: 7,543 (305 away); Referee: Adam Herczeg

15 August 2023 3	Wycombe Wanderers	3–2	Leyton Orient	High Wycombe
19:45 BST	Low 15', 68'; Stryjek (yellow card) 82'; Taylor 84'	Report	Sotiriou 36', 86'; Brown (yellow card) 42'; Happe (red card) 50'; James (yellow card) 58'; Turns (yellow card) 90+7'	Stadium: Adams Park; Attendance: 4,794 (845 away); Referee: Thomas Parsons

19 August 2023 4	Wycombe Wanderers	0–0	Burton Albion	High Wycombe
15:00 BST	Low (yellow card) 27'; Scowen (yellow card) 54'	Report	Caprice (yellow card) 85'; Crocombe (yellow card) 90+2'	Stadium: Adams Park; Attendance: 4,024 (141 away); Referee: Thomas Kirk

26 August 2023 5	Bristol Rovers	1–2	Wycombe Wanderers	Bristol
15:00 BST	Friend (yellow card) 34'; Wilson (yellow card) 67'; Vale 83'; Bogarde (yellow card) 88'	Report	Low 19'; McCleary 74'	Stadium: Memorial Stadium; Attendance: 7,951 (329 away); Referee: Lee Swabey

2 September 2023 6	Northampton Town	0–1	Wycombe Wanderers	Northampton
15:00 BST		Report	Keogh 5'; Phillips (yellow card) 29'; De Barr (yellow card) 86'	Stadium: Sixfields Stadium; Attendance: 6,570 (863 away); Referee: Tom Reeves

16 September 2023 8	Wycombe Wanderers	2–0	Blackpool	High Wycombe
15:00 BST	Vokes 13'; Hanlan 46'; Scowen (yellow card) 64'; Potts (yellow card) 70'; Forino-Joseph (yellow card) 90+2'	Report	Casey (yellow card) 59'	Stadium: Adams Park; Attendance: 4,691 (630 away); Referee: Neil Hair

23 September 2023 9	Charlton Athletic	3–1	Wycombe Wanderers	Charlton
15:00 BST	Leaburn 27'; Dobson (yellow card) 56'; Thomas (yellow card) 64'; Anderson (yellow card) 79'; Tedić 82'; Blackett-Taylor 90+4'	Report	Leahy (yellow card) 3'; Potts 54'; Phillips (yellow card) 90+8'	Stadium: The Valley; Attendance: 12,556 (909 away); Referee: Ben Toner

30 September 2023 10	Wycombe Wanderers	2–0	Carlisle United	High Wycombe
15:00 BST	Leahy 40' (pen.); Stryjek (yellow card) 54'; Forino (yellow card) 65'; Vokes 74'	Report	Moxon (yellow card) 17'; Andrésson (red card) 29'	Stadium: Adams Park; Attendance: 5,499 (405 away); Referee: Scott Tallis

3 October 2023 11	Portsmouth	2–1	Wycombe Wanderers	Portsmouth
19:45 BST	Bishop 58'; Robertson (yellow card) 63'; Poole (yellow card) 71'; Shaughnessy 90+8'	Report	Scowen (yellow card) 20', (goal) 22'; Leahy (yellow card) 40'; Hanlan (yellow card) 72'; Tafazolli (yellow card) 90+1'	Stadium: Fratton Park; Attendance: 17,450 (207 away); Referee: Alan Young

7 October 2023 12	Fleetwood Town	1–4	Wycombe Wanderers	Fleetwood
15:00 BST	Vela (yellow card) 45+3'; Heneghan (yellow card) 46' (yellow-red card) 63'; Marriott 61'; Rooney (yellow card) 74'	Report	Taylor 20', 41'; Potts 34'; Low (yellow card) 36'; Leahy 64'; Boyes (yellow card) 76'	Stadium: Highbury Stadium; Attendance: 2,904; Referee: Ross Joyce

21 October 2023 14	Peterborough United	2–2	Wycombe Wanderers	Peterborough
15:00 GMT	Randall 40'; Mason-Clark 45+1'; Knight (yellow card) 87'	Report	Hanlan 35'; Mason-Clark 61' (o.g.)	Stadium: Weston Homes Stadium; Attendance: 8,665 (468 Away); Referee: Andrew Kitchen

24 October 2023 15	Wycombe Wanderers	2–4	Bolton Wanderers	High Wycombe
19:45 BST	Scowen (yellow card) 43'; Leahy 48'; Wheeler 82'; Keogh (yellow card) 88'; Low (yellow card) 90+1'	Report	Maghoma 14', (yellow card) 41'; Thomason 36'; Toal 85'; Morley 89' (pen.)	Stadium: Adams Park; Attendance: 4,935 (750 Away); Referee: Leigh Doughty

28 October 2023 16	Oxford United	2–2	Wycombe Wanderers	Oxford
15:00 BST	McGuane (yellow card) 18'; Rodrigues 25'; Long (yellow card) 77'; Moore (yellow card) 90+2'; Brannagan 90+6' (pen.)	Report	Potts (yellow card) 34'; Low (yellow card) 36'; Leahy 56' (pen.), 81' (pen.), (yellow card) 90'; Taylor (yellow card) 64'; Pattenden (yellow card) 83'	Stadium: The Kassam Stadium; Attendance: 10,168 (1,448 Away); Referee: Seb Stockbridge

31 October 2023 7	Wycombe Wanderers	0–0	Cambridge United	High Wycombe
19:45 GMT	Leahy (yellow card) 90'; De Barr (yellow card) 90+2'	Report	Andrew (yellow card) 41'; Morrison (yellow card) 62'; Lankester (yellow card) 83'	Stadium: Adams Park; Attendance: 3,879 (384 Away); Referee: Will Finnie
Note: Fixture was previous postponed due to international call-ups.

11 November 2023 17	Wycombe Wanderers	0–1	Stevenage	High Wycombe
15:00 GMT	Forino-Joseph (yellow card) 60'; Leahy (yellow card) 79'; Stryjek (yellow card) 90+12'	Report	Reid 45+14'; Thompson (yellow card) 75'; Forster-Caskey (yellow card) 90+23'	Stadium: Adams Park; Attendance: 4,936 (596 Away); Referee: Ben Speedie

25 November 2023 19	Wycombe Wanderers	1–2	Reading	High Wycombe
15:00 GMT	Boyes (yellow card) 14'; Phillips 32'; Wheeler (yellow card) 90+4'	Report	Smith 30'; Wing 41'	Stadium: Adams Park; Attendance: 7,073 (1,849 Away); Referee: Craig Hicks

28 November 2023 20	Barnsley	1–0	Wycombe Wanderers	Barnsley
19:45 GMT	Cosgrove 90+1'	Report	Phillips (yellow card) 59'; Boyes (yellow card) 89' (yellow-red card) 90+2'; Stryjek (yellow card) 90+2'; Tafazolli (yellow card) 90+5'	Stadium: Oakwell; Attendance: 10,466 (169 Away); Referee: Darren Drysdale

9 December 2023 21	Wycombe Wanderers	0–1	Shrewsbury Town	High Wycombe
15:00 GMT		Report	Perry 41'	Stadium: Adams Park; Attendance: 3,937 (310 Away); Referee: Edward Duckworth

16 December 2023 22	Derby County	1–1	Wycombe Wanderers	Derby
15:00 GMT	Sibley (yellow card) 14'; Mendez-Laing (yellow card) 15'; Hourihane (yellow card) 20'; Collins (yellow card) 30'; Bird (yellow card) 31'; Barkhuizen 83'	Report	Leahy (yellow card) 30', (goal) 90+8' (pen.); Forino (yellow card) 51'; Vokes (yellow card) 82'	Stadium: Pride Park Stadium; Attendance: 25,385 (475 Away); Referee: Rebecca Welch

23 December 2023 23	Wycombe Wanderers	1–1	Port Vale	High Wycombe
15:00 GMT	Sadlier 51'; Vokes (yellow card) 62'; Scowen (yellow card) 64'; Phillips (yellow card) 82'; L. Taylor (yellow card) 86'; D. Taylor (yellow card) 88'; Leahy (yellow card) 89'	Report	Smith (yellow card) 57'; Garrity 90'	Stadium: Adams Park; Attendance: 4,696 (406 Away); Referee: Ben Atkinson

26 December 2023 24	Exeter City	1–0	Wycombe Wanderers	Exeter
15:00 GMT	Rankine (yellow card) 7'; Diabate (yellow card) 45+1'; Aitchison (yellow card) 62'; Cox 65'	Report	Vincent-Young (yellow card) 50'; Sadlier (yellow card) 69'	Stadium: St James Park; Attendance: 7,128 (206 Away); Referee: Charles Breakspear

29 December 2023 25	Leyton Orient	0–0	Wycombe Wanderers	Leyton
15:00 GMT	Agyei (yellow card) 43'	Report		Stadium: Gaughan Group Stadium; Attendance: 8,648 (1,019 Away); Referee: Jacob Miles

1 January 2024 26	Wycombe Wanderers	3–2	Bristol Rovers	High Wycombe
15:00 GMT	Low (yellow card) 9'; Tafazolli 29', (yellow card) 90'; Vokes (yellow card) 39', (goal) 78'; Scowen (red card) 62'; Leahy 80'; Wheeler (yellow card) 88'; Stryjek (yellow card) 90+1'; Grimmer (yellow card) 90+8'	Report	Martin 90+1', (yellow card) 90+1', (goal) 90+8'; Marquis (yellow card) 90+8'	Stadium: Adams Park; Attendance: 5,318 (1,002 Away); Referee: Leigh Doughty

6 January 2023 27	Burton Albion	1–1	Wycombe Wanderers	Burton upon Trent
15:00 GMT	Lubala (yellow card) 30', (goal) 57'; Sweeney (yellow card) 48'	Report	Sadlier (yellow card) 15'; Vokes 67'; Wheeler (yellow card) 87'	Stadium: Pirelli Stadium; Attendance: 3,044; Referee: David Rock

13 January 2024 28	Wycombe Wanderers	1–1	Lincoln City	High Wycombe
15:00 GMT	Taylor 29'; Potts (yellow card) 63'	Report	Hamilton (yellow card) 75'; Erhahon 90+8'	Stadium: Adams Park; Attendance: 4,470; Referee: Scott Oldham

23 January 2024 18	Wigan Athletic	1–0	Wycombe Wanderers	Wigan
19:45 GMT	Jones (yellow card) 45'; Morrison (yellow card) 90+11'; Smith (yellow card) 90+17'; Hughes 90+20'	Report	Grimmer (yellow card) 90+20'	Stadium: DW Stadium; Referee: Adam Herczeg
Note: Fixture was previously postponed due to international call-ups.

27 January 2024 30	Wycombe Wanderers	2–2	Fleetwood Town	High Wycombe
15:00 GMT	Potts (yellow card) 43'; Leahy (penalty missed) 53'; McCleary 62' (pen.); Kone 83'	Report	Omochere 14', (yellow card) 28' (yellow-red card) 45+4'; Stockley 31', (yellow card) 66'; Heneghan (yellow card) 52'; Lawal (yellow card) 81'	Stadium: Adams Park; Referee: Lee Swabey

3 February 2024 31	Cheltenham Town	1–3	Wycombe Wanderers	Cheltenham
15:00 GMT	Taylor 58', (yellow card) 87'	Report	Grimmer 20', (yellow card) 37'; McCleary 29', (penalty missed) 49'; Davies 49' (o.g.); Butcher (yellow card) 60'	Stadium: The Completely-Suzuki Stadium; Attendance: 4,181; Referee: Martin Coy

10 February 2024 32	Wycombe Wanderers	5–2	Peterborough United	High Wycombe
15:00 GMT	Potts (yellow card) 26'; Vincent-Young 38'; Grimmer 45+11'; Sadlier 57'; Vokes 74'; Wheeler 90+2'; Lubala (yellow card) 90+9'	Report	Ajiboye 66'; Jones 69'; Aderoju (yellow card) 89'	Stadium: Adams Park; Attendance: 4,800; Referee: Ollie Yates

13 February 2024 33	Bolton Wanderers	2–1	Wycombe Wanderers	Bolton
19:45 GMT	Jones 32'; Böðvarsson 90+1'; Coleman (yellow card) 90+7'	Report	Butcher (yellow card) 90+1'; Leahy 90+8' (pen.)	Stadium: Toughsheet Community Stadium; Attendance: 18,778; Referee: Will Finnie

17 February 2024 34	Wycombe Wanderers	0–0	Oxford United	High Wycombe
15:00 GMT		Report	Brannagan (yellow card) 45+2'; Goodrham (yellow card) 52'; Rodrigues (yellow card) 86'	Stadium: Adams Park; Attendance: 6,781; Referee: Simon Mather

24 February 2024 35	Stevenage	1–0	Wycombe Wanderers	Stevenage
15:00 GMT	Piergianni 23'; Ashby-Hammond (yellow card) 81'	Report	Lonwijk (yellow card) 7'; Stryjek (red card) 48'	Stadium: Lamex Stadium; Attendance: 4,660; Referee: Darren Drysdale

27 February 2024 13	Wycombe Wanderers	2–0	Cheltenham Town	High Wycombe
19:45 GMT	Low 86'; Lubala 89'	Report	Smith (yellow card) 85'	Stadium: Adams Park; Attendance: 3,477; Referee: Peter Wright
Note: Fixture was originally scheduled for 14 October, but was postponed due to international call-ups.

2 March 2024 36	Wycombe Wanderers	2–4	Barnsley	High Wycombe
15:00 GMT	Taylor 16'; Grimmer (yellow card) 44'; Leahy (yellow card) 45+1'; Sadlier 52'; Wheeler (red card) 68'; Kone (yellow card) 74'	Report	Phillips (yellow card) 35'; Cosgrove (yellow card) 44', (goal) 45+2'; Pines 56'; O'Keeffe 65'; Grant 72'; Russell (yellow card) 90+7'	Stadium: Adams Park; Attendance: 4,768; Referee: Dean Whitestone

9 March 2024 37	Reading	1–2	Wycombe Wanderers	Reading
15:00 GMT	Yiadom (yellow card) 68'; Smith 74'; Azeez (yellow card) 90'	Report	Lonwijk 16'; Butcher (yellow card) 46'; Lubala 88', (yellow card) 88'	Stadium: Select Car Leasing Stadium; Attendance: 15,038; Referee: Carl Brook

12 March 2024 38	Wycombe Wanderers	1–0	Wigan Athletic	High Wycombe
19:45 GMT	Tickle 19' (o.g.); Grimmer (yellow card) 72'; Ravizzoli (yellow card) 79'	Report	Smith (yellow card) 27'	Stadium: Adams Park; Attendance: 3,568; Referee: Scott Tallis

16 March 2024 39	Wycombe Wanderers	2–0	Northampton Town	High Wycombe
15:00 GMT	Butcher 69', 84'; Kone (yellow card) 79'	Report	Monthé (yellow card) 29'; Sowerby (yellow card) 36'; McGowan (yellow card) 90+5'	Stadium: Adams Park; Attendance: 4,583; Referee: Ollie Yates

29 March 2024 41	Wycombe Wanderers	1–3	Portsmouth	High Wycombe
15:00 GMT	Butcher 7'; Tafazolli (yellow card) 30'; Potts (yellow card) 88'	Report	Bishop 3', 28', (yellow card) 87'; Norris (yellow card) 57'; Moxon (yellow card) 60'; Saydee 67'	Stadium: Adams Park; Attendance: 6,793; Referee: Tom Nield

1 April 2024 42	Blackpool	0–0	Wycombe Wanderers	Blackpool
15:00 BST	Norburn (yellow card) 14'; Lawrence-Gabriel (yellow card) 75'	Report	Low (yellow card) 20'	Stadium: Bloomfield Road; Attendance: 10,171; Referee: Ross Joyce

10 April 2024 43	Wycombe Wanderers	0–0	Derby County	High Wycombe
19:45 BST	Sadlier (yellow card) 67'	Report	Smith (yellow card) 28'	Stadium: Adams Park; Attendance: 5,515; Referee: Matt Donohue
Note: Fixture was initially scheduled for 6 April, but was moved due to the 2024 EFL Trophy final involvement.

13 April 2024 44	Shrewsbury Town	0–2	Wycombe Wanderers	Shrewsbury
15:00 BST	Flanagan (red card) 67'; Winchester (yellow card) 70'	Report	Leahy 83'; Kone 90+1'	Stadium: New Meadow; Attendance: 6,206; Referee: Martin Woods

16 April 2024 29	Port Vale	1–2	Wycombe Wanderers	Stoke-on-Trent
19:45 BST	Chislett 47'; Ikpeazu (yellow card) 85'; Massey (yellow card) 90+7'	Report	Wheeler 4'; Lonwijk (yellow card) 43', (goal) 86'; Grimmer (yellow card) 60'	Stadium: Vale Park; Attendance: 4,029; Referee: John Busby
Note: Fixture was originally scheduled for 20 January, but was postponed due to a frozen pitch.

20 April 2024 45	Carlisle United	1–2	Wycombe Wanderers	Carlisle
15:00 BST	McCalmont 28'	Report	McCleary 15', 75'; Kone 49'	Stadium: Brunton Park; Attendance: 6,538; Referee: Ben Speedie

23 April 2024 40	Cambridge United	1–1	Wycombe Wanderers	Cambridge
19:45 BST	Ahadme 71'; Okedina (yellow card) 81'; Gibbons (yellow card) 90+7'	Report	Leahy 83' (pen.)	Stadium: Cledara Abbey Stadium; Attendance: 6,081; Referee: Will Finnie
Note: Fixture was originally scheduled for 23 March, but was postponed due to international call-ups.

27 April 2024 46	Wycombe Wanderers	1–0	Charlton Athletic	High Wycombe
15:00 BST	Leahy 7'	Report		Stadium: Adams Park; Attendance: 6,702; Referee: Elliot Bell

=== FA Cup ===
Wycombe were drawn away to Bradford City in the first round and at home to Morecambe in the second round.

Win Loss Fixtures

4 November 2023 First Round	Bradford City	1–2	Wycombe Wanderers	Bradford
15:00 GMT	Ridehalgh (yellow card) 22'; Stubbs (yellow card) 38'; Walker 64', (yellow card) 80'	Report	Phillips 18', (yellow card) 80'; Leahy (yellow card) 24'; Stubbs 35' (o.g.); Stryjek (yellow card) 85'; Hanlan (yellow card) 90+1'; De Barr (yellow card) 90+3'	Stadium: University of Bradford Stadium; Attendance: 3,642; Referee: Declan Bourne

2 December 2023 Second Round	Wycombe Wanderers	0–2	Morecambe	High Wycombe
15:00 GMT	Phillips (yellow card) 88'	Report	King 38'; Bloxham 56'; Mayor (yellow card) 74'; Smith (yellow card) 90+5'	Stadium: Adams Park; Attendance: 1,604; Referee: Peter Wright

=== EFL Cup ===
Wycombe were drawn away to Milton Keynes Dons in the first round and at home to Sutton United in the second round.

Win Draw Loss Fixtures

8 August 2023 First round	Milton Keynes Dons	0–2	Wycombe Wanderers	Milton Keynes
19:45 BST	Hunter (yellow card) 16'; O'Hora (yellow card) 31'	Report	Tafazolli (yellow card) 38'; Hanlan 73'; Forino-Joseph 82'	Stadium: Stadium MK; Attendance: 2,946; Referee: James Bell

29 August 2023 Second round	Wycombe Wanderers	0–1	Sutton United	High Wycombe
19:45 BST	Low (yellow card) 39'; Leahy (yellow card) 50'	Report	O'Brien 19'; Coley (yellow card) 58'; Sowunmi (yellow card) 77'	Stadium: Adams Park; Attendance: 1,778 (282 away); Referee: Christopher Pollard

=== EFL Trophy ===
==== Group stage ====
In the group stage, Wycombe were drawn in Southern Group C alongside AFC Wimbledon, Stevenage and Crystal Palace U21.

Pos	Div	Team	Pld	W	PW	PL	L	GF	GA	GD	Pts	Qualification
1	L1	Wycombe Wanderers	3	3	0	0	0	3	0	+3	9	Advance to Round 2
2	L2	AFC Wimbledon	3	1	1	0	1	3	2	+1	5	Advance to Round 2
3	L1	Stevenage	3	1	0	1	1	6	4	+2	4	
4	ACA	Crystal Palace U21	3	0	0	0	3	2	8	−6	0	

Updated to match(es) played on 14 November 2023. Source: EFL.com

Win Draw Loss Fixtures

19 September 2023 1	Wycombe Wanderers	1–0	Crystal Palace U21	High Wycombe
19:00 BST	Keogh (yellow card) 60'; Skura (yellow card) 68'; Leahy 90+2' (pen.)	Report	Grehan (yellow card) 45'; Ebiowei (yellow card) 45+3'; Devenny (yellow card) 50'; Whitworth (yellow card) 90'; Imray (yellow card) 90+1'	Stadium: Adams Park; Attendance: 442; Referee: Sam Purkiss

10 October 2023 2	Stevenage	0–1	Wycombe Wanderers	Stevenage
19:00 BST				Stadium: Lamex Stadium; Attendance: 905

18 November 2023 3	Wycombe Wanderers	1–0	AFC Wimbledon	High Wycombe
12:30 GMT	Sadlier 84'; Breckin (yellow card) 89'	Report	Davison (penalty missed) 32'; Kalambayi (yellow card) 80'	Stadium: Adams Park; Attendance: 664; Referee: Aji Ajibola

==== Knockout stage ====
After topping the group, they were drawn at home to Fulham U21 in the second round. Wycombe beat Fulham U21's and were drawn against West Ham United U21's in the Round of 16. Wycombe beat West Ham U21's 2–1 and were drawn against Brighton & Hove Albion U21's at home in the Quarter Finals. Wycombe beat Brighton 4–1 and were drawn against Bradford City at Valley Parade in the Semi-Finals. Wycombe beat Bradford City 0–1 and faced Peterborough United at Wembley Stadium in the Final.

5 December 2023 Round of 32	Wycombe Wanderers	3-2	Fulham U21	High Wycombe
19:00 GMT				Stadium: Adams Park

9 January 2024 Round of 16	Wycombe Wanderers	2–1	West Ham United U21	High Wycombe
19:00 GMT	Orford 5' (o.g.); Kone 32'; Scowen (yellow card) 77'; Wheeler (yellow card) 90+6'	Report	Kodua 58'	Stadium: Adams Park; Attendance: 881 (324 away); Referee: Alex Chilowicz

31 January 2024 Quarter-finals	Wycombe Wanderers	4–1	Brighton & Hove Albion U21	High Wycombe
19:00 GMT	Sadlier 40', 45+1'; Kavanagh 44' (o.g.); Taylor 47'	Report	Hinchy (yellow card) 31'; Mullins (red card) 54'; Barrington 65'	Stadium: Adams Park; Referee: Paul Howard
Note: Brighton were Drawn as the Home side but were granted Special Dispensation by the EFL to play Away from Home. They were also given Dispensation by the EFL to play the Game on Wednesday 31 January due to their first Team playing on Tuesday 30 January

21 February 2024 Semi-finals	Bradford City	0–1	Wycombe Wanderers	Bradford
20:00 GMT				Stadium: Valley Parade

7 April 2024 Final	Peterborough United	2–1	Wycombe Wanderers	Wembley
16:30 BST	Collins (yellow card) 81'; Burrows 85', 90+1', (yellow card) 90+8'	Report	Taylor 89'; Forino-Joseph (yellow card) 90+8'	Stadium: Wembley Stadium; Attendance: 42,252; Referee: Scott Oldham

== Squad statistics ==
=== Appearances and goals ===
As of 9 January 2023

No.	Pos	Nat	Player	Total		League One		FA Cup		EFL Cup		EFL Trophy	
No.	Pos	Nat	Player	Apps	Goals	Apps	Goals	Apps	Goals	Apps	Goals	Apps	Goals
1	GK	(Poland) POL	Max Stryjek	28	0	25	0	1	0	2	0	0	0
2	DF	(Scotland) SCO	Jack Grimmer	17	0	12	0	1	0	1	0	3	0
3	DF	(Wales) WAL	Joe Jacobson	7	0	3	0	1	0	0	0	3	0
4	MF	(England) ENG	Josh Scowen	29	1	22	1	1	0	2	0	4	0
5	DF	(Saint Lucia) LCA	Chris Forino	25	2	19	0	1	0	2	1	3	1
6	DF	(England) ENG	Ryan Tafazolli	20	1	15	1	2	0	1	0	2	0
7	MF	(England) ENG	David Wheeler	22	1	16	1	1	0	1	0	4	0
9	FW	(Wales) WAL	Sam Vokes	26	5	21	4	0	0	2	0	3	1
10	DF	(England) ENG	Luke Leahy	30	8	23	7	1	0	2	0	4	1
11	DF	(England) ENG	Harry Boyes (Note: Harry Boyes is on loan from Sheffield United.)	29	0	22	0	1	0	2	0	4	0
12	FW	(Jamaica) JAM	Garath McCleary	31	2	25	2	1	0	1	0	4	0
13	GK	(Kosovo) KOS	Laurence Shala (Note: Laurence Shala is on loan at Potters Bar Town.)	0	0	0	0	0	0	0	0	0	0
15	MF	(England) ENG	Jack Young (Note: Jack Young is on loan at Ayr United.)	0	0	0	0	0	0	0	0	0	0
16	DF	(Republic of Ireland) IRL	Richard Keogh	25	0	17	0	2	0	2	0	4	0
17	DF	(Wales) WAL	Joe Low	24	3	19	3	2	0	2	0	1	0
18	FW	(England) ENG	Brandon Hanlan	19	3	16	2	1	0	1	1	1	0
19	MF	(England) ENG	Freddie Potts (Note: Freddie Potts is on loan from West Ham United.)	22	2	18	2	1	0	2	0	1	0
20	FW	(Northern Ireland) NIR	Dale Taylor (Note: Dale Taylor is on loan from Nottingham Forest.)	29	5	23	3	2	0	1	0	3	2
21	FW	(England) ENG	D'Mani Mellor (Note: D'Mani Mellor is on loan at Rochdale.)	1	0	0	0	0	0	1	0	0	0
22	MF	(Republic of Ireland) IRL	Killian Phillips (Note: Killian Phillips is on loan from Crystal Palace.)	29	2	23	1	2	1	1	0	3	0
23	MF	(Republic of Ireland) IRL	Kieran Sadlier	23	2	17	1	2	0	0	0	4	1
24	FW	(Ivory Coast) CIV	Richard Kone	1	1	0	0	0	0	0	0	1	1
25	GK	(Argentina) ARG	Franco Ravizzoli	6	0	0	0	1	0	0	0	5	0
26	DF	(England) ENG	Jason McCarthy	1	0	1	0	0	0	0	0	0	0
29	FW	(Gibraltar) GIB	Tjay De Barr	15	0	9	0	2	0	2	0	2	0
31	MF	(England) ENG	Jasper Pattenden	11	0	8	0	0	0	0	0	3	0
32	MF	(England) ENG	Taylor Clark (Note: Taylor Clark is on loan at Farnborough.)	2	0	0	0	0	0	0	0	2	0
33	MF	(England) ENG	Luca Woodhouse (Note: Luca Woodhouse is on loan at Worthing.)	1	0	0	0	0	0	0	0	1	0
34	DF	(England) ENG	Jack Wakely (Note: Jack Wakely is on loan at Ebbsfleet United.)	1	0	0	0	0	0	0	0	1	0
35	MF	(England) ENG	Christie Ward	2	0	0	0	0	0	0	0	2	0
39	DF	(England) ENG	Declan Skura	3	0	0	0	0	0	0	0	3	0
40	DF	(United States) USA	Max Cavana	0	0	0	0	0	0	0	0	0	0
44	DF	(England) ENG	Kane Vincent-Young	14	0	12	0	0	0	1	0	1	0
Players who left the club before the end of the season:
8	MF	(England) ENG	Kian Breckin	9	0	2	0	1	0	2	0	4	0
30	FW	(Montserrat) MSR	Lyle Taylor	9	0	7	0	1	0	0	0	1	0
36	DF	(England) ENG	Antoine Makoli	0	0	0	0	0	0	0	0	0	0

== Transfers ==
=== In ===
Date	Pos	Player	Transferred from	Fee	Ref
4 July 2023	CB	Richard Keogh (IRL)	Ipswich Town (ENG)	Free transfer	
11 July 2023	LB	Luke Leahy (ENG)	Shrewsbury Town (ENG)	Undisclosed	
13 July 2023	RB	Kane Vincent-Young (ENG)	Ipswich Town (ENG)	Free transfer	
18 July 2023	CB	Joe Low (WAL)	Bristol City (ENG)	Undisclosed	
21 July 2023	GK	Laurence Shala (KVX)	Crystal Palace (ENG)	Free transfer	
25 August 2023	CM	Taylor Clark (ENG)	Needham Market (ENG)	Free transfer	
4 September 2023	LW	Kieran Sadlier (IRL)	Bolton Wanderers (ENG)	Free transfer	
5 September 2023	CB	Max Cavana (USA)	Free agent	—N/a	
14 September 2023	GK	Franco Ravizzoli (ARG)	Free agent	—N/a	
16 November 2023	CF	Lyle Taylor (MSR)	Free agent	—N/a	
1 January 2024	CF	Richard Kone (CIV)	Athletic Newham (ENG)	Undisclosed	
30 January 2024	LW	Beryly Lubala (COD)	Burton Albion (ENG)	Free transfer	
31 January 2024	DM	Matt Butcher (ENG)	Plymouth Argyle (ENG)	Free transfer	
27 February 2024	GK	Nathan Shepperd (WAL)	Dundalk (IRL)	Free transfer	

=== Out ===
Date	Pos	Player	Transferred to	Fee	Ref
30 June 2023	GK	Josh Blunkell (ENG)	Braintree Town (ENG)	Released	
30 June 2023	GK	Tyla Dickinson (ENG)	Free agent	Released	
30 June 2023	CM	Nick Freeman (ENG)	Stevenage (ENG)	End of Contract	
30 June 2023	DM	Dominic Gape (ENG)	Free agent	End of Contract	
30 June 2023	RW	Charles Hagan (ENG)	Free agent	Released	
30 June 2023	LM	Daryl Horgan (IRL)	Dundalk (IRL)	Released	
30 June 2023	CB	Ben Kaninda (ENG)	Free agent	Released	
30 June 2023	DM	Adam Leathers (ENG)	Billericay Town (ENG)	Released	
30 June 2023	CF	Arnold Matshazi (ENG)	Braintree Town (ENG)	Released	
30 June 2023	LB	Jordan Obita (ENG)	Hibernian (SCO)	End of Contract	
30 June 2023	CM	Curtis Thompson (ENG)	Cheltenham Town (ENG)	Released	
30 June 2023	CB	Jordan Willis (ENG)	Free agent	Released	
30 June 2023	CM	Lewis Wing (ENG)	Reading (ENG)	End of Contract	
11 August 2023	RB	Antoine Makoli (ENG)	Hyde United (ENG)	Mutual Consent	
12 January 2024	CF	Lyle Taylor (MSR)	Cambridge United (ENG)	Released	
17 January 2024	CB	Richard Keogh (IRL)	Forest Green Rovers (ENG)	Mutual Consent	
24 January 2024	CF	Tjay De Barr (GIB)	Lincoln Red Imps (GIB)	Free transfer	

=== Loaned in ===
Date	Pos	Player	Loaned from	Until	Ref
11 July 2023	CM	Kian Breckin (ENG)	Manchester City (ENG)	4 January 2024 (Note: On 4 January, Breckin returned to Manchester City early from his season-long loan.)	
13 July 2023	LB	Harry Boyes (ENG)	Sheffield United (ENG)	12 January 2024 (Note: On 12 January, Boyes returned to Sheffield United early from his season-long loan.)	
23 July 2023	CF	Dale Taylor (NIR)	Nottingham Forest (ENG)	End of season	
28 July 2023	DM	Freddie Potts (ENG)	West Ham United (ENG)	End of season	
11 August 2023	AM	Killian Phillips (IRL)	Crystal Palace (ENG)	28 January 2024 (Note: On 28 January, Phillips returned to Crystal Palace early from his season-long loan.)	
12 January 2024	CF	Gideon Kodua (ENG)	West Ham United (ENG)	End of season	
16 January 2024	AM	Chem Campbell (WAL)	Wolverhampton Wanderers (ENG)	End of season	
1 February 2024	LB	Saxon Earley (ENG)	Plymouth Argyle (ENG)	End of season	
1 February 2024	CB	Nigel Lonwijk (NED)	Wolverhampton Wanderers (ENG)	End of season	

=== Loaned out ===
Date	Pos	Player	Loaned to	Date until	Ref
1 July 2023	CB	Jack Wakely (ENG)	Ebbsfleet United (ENG)	End of season	
11 August 2023	CF	D'Mani Mellor (ENG)	Sutton United (ENG)	January 2024	
25 August 2023	CM	Jack Young (ENG)	Ayr United (SCO)	January 2024	
2 September 2023	CM	Luca Woodhouse (ENG)	Worthing (ENG)	January 2024	
25 September 2023	CB	Max Cavana (USA)	Aylesbury United (ENG)	11 January 2024	
5 January 2024	CM	Taylor Clark (ENG)	Farnborough (ENG)	3 February 2024	
5 January 2024	GK	Laurence Shala (KOS)	Potters Bar Town (ENG)	End of season	
11 January 2024	CF	D'Mani Mellor (ENG)	Rochdale (ENG)	End of season	
16 January 2024	CB	Declan Skura (ENG)	Ebbsfleet United (ENG)	End of season	
2 February 2024	AM	Christie Ward (ENG)	Slough Town (ENG)	1 March 2024	
22 February 2024	CM	Jack Young (ENG)	Wealdstone (ENG)	End of season	
27 February 2024	CM	Luca Woodhouse (ENG)	Banbury United (ENG)	21 March 2024	
13 April 2024	GK	Max Stryjek (POL)	Crewe Alexandra (ENG)	20 April 2024	

== See also ==
- 2023–24 in English football
- 2023–24 EFL League One
