= Declan Skura =

English footballer (born 2002)

Personal information
- Full name: Declan Skura
- Date of birth: 9 April 2002 (age 24)
- Place of birth: Kingston upon Thames, England
- Height: 1.88 m (6 ft 2 in)
- Position: Centre-back

Team information
- Current team: Walsall (on loan from Wycombe Wanderers)
- Number: 25

Youth career
- Chelsea
- Reading

Senior career*
Years	Team	Apps	(Gls)
- Hanworth Villa
2020–2023	Kingstonian	28	(1)
2023–	Wycombe Wanderers	12	(1)
2024	→ Ebbsfleet United (loan)	17	(0)
2026	→ Yeovil Town (loan)	6	(1)
2026–	→ Walsall (loan)	12	(1)
- * Club domestic league appearances and goals as of 21:06, 17 October 2026 (UTC)

Declan Skura (born 9 April 2002) is an English professional footballer who plays as a centre-back for EFL League Two club Walsall on loan from EFL League One club Wycombe Wanderers.

== Career ==
Skura spent time in the academy systems at Chelsea and Reading, before entering non-League football with Hanworth Villa and Kingstonian.

In February 2023, he signed a development squad contract with EFL League One club Wycombe Wanderers following a successful trial match against Woking. He made his first-team debut for Wycombe on 19 September 2023, starting in a 1–0 win over Crystal Palace U21 in an EFL Trophy group stage match at Adams Park. In January 2024, he joined National League club Ebbsfleet United on loan until the end of the season. Skura made his league debut for Wycombe on 31 August 2024, as a substitute in a 2-2 draw with Blackpool.

In February 2026, Skura joined National League club Yeovil Town on loan until the end of the season. After a month with Yeovil, Skura was recalled by Wycombe amid injury issues at his parent club.

On 21 July 2026, Skura joined League Two club Walsall on loan on a season long deal.

== Career statistics ==
As of match played 17 October 2026

Appearances and goals by club, season and competition
Club	Season	League			FA Cup		EFL Cup		Other		Total	
Club	Season	Division	Apps	Goals	Apps	Goals	Apps	Goals	Apps	Goals	Apps	Goals
Kingstonian	2020–21	Isthmian League; Premier Division	0	0	0	0	—		0	0	0	0
Kingstonian	2021–22	Isthmian League; Premier Division	12	1	2	0	—		1 (Note: Appearance in FA Trophy)	0	15	1
Kingstonian	2022–23	Isthmian League; Premier Division	16	0	1	0	—		3 (Note: 1 appearance in FA Trophy, 1 appearance in Velocity Cup, 1 appearance in Surrey Senior Cup)	0	20	0
Kingstonian	Total		28	1	3	0	—		4	0	35	1
Wycombe Wanderers	2023–24	EFL League One	0	0	0	0	0	0	3 (Note: Appearance(s) in EFL Trophy)	0	3	0
Wycombe Wanderers	2024–25	EFL League One	8	0	4	0	2	0	4	0	18	0
Wycombe Wanderers	2025–26	EFL League One	4	1	0	0	1	0	1	0	6	1
Wycombe Wanderers	2026–27	EFL League One	0	0	0	0	0	0	0	0	0	0
Wycombe Wanderers	Total		12	1	4	0	3	0	8	0	27	1
Ebbsfleet United (loan)	2023–24	National League	17	0	—		—		0	0	17	0
Yeovil Town (loan)	2025–26	National League	6	1	—		—		1	0	7	1
Walsall (loan)	2026–27	EFL League Two	12	1	0	0	2	0	0	0	14	1
Career total			75	4	7	0	5	0	13	0	100	4
