= Christie Ward =

English footballer (born 2003)

Personal information
- Full name: Christie John Ward
- Date of birth: 19 November 2003 (age 22)
- Place of birth: Poole, England
- Position: Midfielder

Team information
- Current team: AFC Totton

Youth career
- Pro Direct Academy
- Hamworthy United

Senior career*
Years	Team	Apps	(Gls)
2020	Hamworthy United	3	(0)
2020–2022	Brockenhurst	36	(11)
2022–2025	Wycombe Wanderers	3	(0)
2022–2023	→ Hungerford Town (loan)	15	(2)
2024	→ Slough Town (loan)	7	(0)
2024	→ Banbury United (loan)	9	(0)
2024	→ Braintree Town (loan)	2	(0)
2024–2025	→ Weymouth (loan)	13	(1)
2025	→ Tonbridge Angels (loan)	16	(0)
2025–	AFC Totton	36	(9)
- * Club domestic league appearances and goals as of 13:34, 18 August 2026 (UTC)

Christie John Ward (born 9 November 2003) is an English professional footballer who plays as a midfielder for National League South club AFC Totton.

== Career ==
=== Wycombe Wanderers ===
Ward graduated through the Pro Direct Academy whilst playing for Hamworthy United and was with Wessex League club Brockenhurst from the ages of sixteen to eighteen, scoring 19 goals in 47 appearances during the 2021–22 season, including the FA Vase's goal of the tournament against Brimscombe & Thrupp in the second round. He signed with Wycombe Wanderers on 12 July 2022. He made his first-team debut in an EFL Trophy match on 18 October 2022, after coming on as an 89th-minute substitute for Adam Leathers in a 1–1 draw with Peterborough United at Adams Park. On 11 November 2022, Ward joined National League South side Hungerford Town on a one-month loan deal. On 7 March 2023, Ward was recalled, leaving Hungerford after making 15 appearances.

On 2 February 2024, Ward signed for Slough Town on loan. On 22 March 2024, he joined Banbury United on loan for the remainder of the season.

On 7 September 2024, Ward joined National League side Braintree Town on an initial twenty-eight day loan. Having cut his loan with the club short, he joined National League South side Weymouth on loan. On 7 February 2025, he joined Tonbridge Angels on an initial one-month loan.

=== AFC Totton ===
On 14 June 2025, Ward agreed to join newly promoted National League South side AFC Totton.

== Personal life ==
Ward's older brother, Calum, is also a professional footballer and currently plays as a goalkeeper for Championship side Queens Park Rangers.

== Career statistics ==
As of match played 5 April 2025

Appearances and goals by club, season and competition
Club	Season	League			FA Cup		EFL Cup		Other		Total	
Club	Season	Division	Apps	Goals	Apps	Goals	Apps	Goals	Apps	Goals	Apps	Goals
Hamworthy United	2020–21	Wessex League Premier Division	3	0	0	0	—		3 (Note: Two appearances and one goal in the Wessex League Cup, one appearance in the FA Vase)	1	6	1
Brockenhurst	2020–21	Wessex League Premier Division	0	0	—		—		—		0	0
Brockenhurst	2021–22	Wessex League Premier Division	36	11	1	0	—		8 (Note: Two appearances and three goals in the Wessex League Cup, six appearances and five goals in the FA Vase)	8	47	19
Brockenhurst	Total		36	11	1	0	—		8	8	47	19
Wycombe Wanderers	2022–23	League One	3	0	0	0	0	0	1 (Note: Appearances in the EFL Trophy)	0	4	0
Wycombe Wanderers	2023–24	League One	0	0	0	0	0	0	2	0	2	0
Wycombe Wanderers	2024–25	League One	0	0	—		0	0	1	0	1	0
Wycombe Wanderers	Total		3	0	0	0	0	0	4	0	7	0
Hungerford Town (loan)	2022–23	National League South	15	2	—		—		3 (Note: Appearances in the FA Trophy)	1	18	3
Slough Town (loan)	2023–24	National League South	7	0	—		—		—		7	0
Banbury United (loan)	2023–24	National League North	8	0	—		—		—		8	0
Braintree Town (loan)	2024–25	National League	2	0	—		—		—		2	0
Weymouth (loan)	2024–25	National League South	13	1	1	0	—		3	0	17	1
Tonbridge Angels (loan)	2024–25	National League South	12	0	—		—		—		12	0
Career total			99	14	2	0	0	0	21	10	122	24
