= Freddie Potts =

English footballer (born 2003)

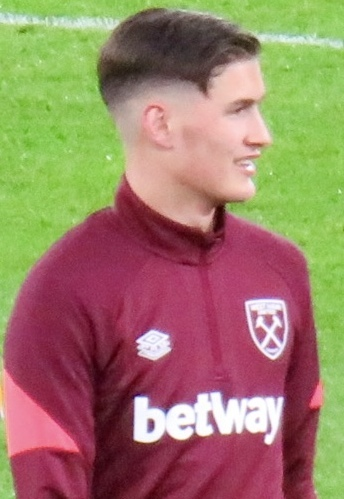
- Freddie Potts warming-up for West Ham United in 2021

Personal information
- Full name: Freddie Potts
- Date of birth: 12 September 2003 (age 23)
- Place of birth: Barking, England
- Height: 6 ft 0 in (1.83 m)
- Position: Defensive midfielder

Team information
- Current team: Club Brugge
- Number: 8

Youth career
- 2009–2021: West Ham United

Senior career*
Years	Team	Apps	(Gls)
2021–2026	West Ham United	22	(0)
2023–2024	→ Wycombe Wanderers (loan)	36	(2)
2024–2025	→ Portsmouth (loan)	37	(1)
2026–	Club Brugge	10	(0)
- * Club domestic league appearances and goals as of 22:45, 31 October 2026 (UTC)

Freddie Potts (born 12 September 2003) is an English professional footballer who plays as a defensive midfielder for Belgian Pro League club Club Brugge.

== Career ==
=== West Ham United ===
Joining West Ham United at the age of six, Potts signed his first professional contract with the club in June 2021. On 9 December 2021, Potts made his senior debut for West Ham in a 1–0 loss against Dinamo Zagreb in the UEFA Europa League, coming on as an 87th-minute substitute for Andriy Yarmolenko.

On 7 June 2023, Potts was part of the squad in the 2023 UEFA Europa Conference League final, against Fiorentina in Prague. West Ham won their first major trophy in 43 years with a 2–1 victory.

In July 2023, Potts joined League One club Wycombe Wanderers on a season-long loan. Manager Matt Bloomfield said of Potts, "he plays with real energy and athleticism in the middle of the park and will really suit the way we want to play". He made his Wycombe debut on 5 August in a 3–0 home defeat by Exeter City. He scored his first goal for the club in a 3–1 away defeat to Charlton Athletic on 23 September. His 20 yards (18 m) volley levelled the score with Wycombe conceding two late goals.

At the end of the 2023–24 season, Potts was voted both the Supporters' Player of the Year and the Young Player of the Year by Wycombe Wanderers supporters.

On 27 August 2024, Potts joined Championship side Portsmouth on a season-long loan deal. He made his Portsmouth debut on 21 September in a 2–1 away defeat to Burnley.

On 22 August 2025, Potts made his Premier League debut, coming on as a half-time substitute for Jean-Clair Todibo in a 5–1 home defeat at the London Stadium to Chelsea. He made his first start for the club on 2 November 2025, in a 3–1 home win against Newcastle United.

=== Club Brugge ===
Potts left West Ham and signed for Belgian club Club Brugge on a four-year contract on 4 August 2026. He made his debut on 7 August 2026 during the 3–0 victory against Kortrijk. On 8 September, Freddie Potts made his UEFA Champions League debut in a 3–2 home loss to Aston Villa.

== Personal life ==
Potts is the son of former West Ham United player and current coach, Steve Potts and the brother of former Luton Town player Dan Potts.

== Career statistics ==
=== Club ===
As of 31 October 2026

Appearances and goals by club, season and competition
Club	Season	League			Cup		League Cup		Europe		Other		Total	
Club	Season	Division	Apps	Goals	Apps	Goals	Apps	Goals	Apps	Goals	Apps	Goals	Apps	Goals
West Ham United U21	2021–22	–									1 (Note: Appearance in EFL Trophy)	0	1	0
West Ham United U21	2022–23	–									2	0	2	0
West Ham United U21	2025–26	–									1	0	1	0
West Ham United	2021–22	Premier League	0	0	0	0	0	0	1 (Note: Appearance in UEFA Europa League)	0	0	0	1	0
West Ham United	2022–23	Premier League	0	0	0	0	0	0	2 (Note: Appearance in UEFA Conference League)	0	0	0	2	0
West Ham United	2023–24	Premier League	0	0	0	0	0	0	0	0	0	0	0	0
West Ham United	2025–26	Premier League	22	0	3	0	0	0	0	0	0	0	25	0
West Ham United	Total		22	0	3	0	0	0	3	0	4	0	32	0
Wycombe Wanderers (loan)	2023–24	League One	36	2	1	0	2	0	0	0	3	0	42	2
Portsmouth (loan)	2024–25	Championship	37	1	1	0	0	0	0	0	—		38	1
Club Brugge	2026–27	Pro League	10	0	1	0	—		3 (Note: Appearance in UEFA Champions League)	0	—		14	0
Career total			105	3	6	0	2	0	6	0	7	0	126	3

== Honours ==
West Ham United

- UEFA Europa Conference League: 2022–23

Wycombe Wanderers

- EFL Trophy runner-up: 2023–24

Individual

- Wycombe Wanderers Player of the Season: 2023–24
