= Jack Matton =

English association football player

Personal information
- Full name: Jack Kenneth Matton
- Date of birth: 23 May 2006 (age 20)
- Place of birth: Chertsey, England
- Position: Defender

Team information
- Current team: Aldershot Town (on loan from Wycombe Wanderers)
- Number: 16

Youth career
- –2024: Woking

Senior career*
Years	Team	Apps	(Gls)
2024	Woking	0	(0)
2024	→ Binfield (dual-registration)	10	(2)
2024–	Wycombe Wanderers	1	(0)
2024–2025	→ Bracknell Town (loan)	14	(1)
2025	→ Bracknell Town (loan)	12	(1)
2025	→ Tonbridge Angels (loan)	4	(0)
2026	→ Hanwell Town (loan)	12	(0)
2026–	→ Aldershot Town (loan)	6	(0)
- * Club domestic league appearances and goals as of 18:51, 18 November 2026 (UTC)

Jack Kenneth Matton (born 23 May 2006) is an English professional footballer who plays as a defender for Aldershot Town on loan from EFL League One club Wycombe Wanderers.

== Club career ==
=== Early career ===
Matton started his career with Woking. While with the Cards, he also dual-registered with Binfield and later earned selection for the England under-18 schoolboys squad.

=== Wycombe Wanderers ===
After a successful trial, Matton agreed to sign for Wycombe Wanderers in June 2024. On 14 October 2024, he moved to Southern League Premier Division South side Bracknell Town on loan. Across two loan spells during the 2024–25 season, Matton made 26 appearances and scored twice for Bracknell before returning to Wycombe.

On 28 July 2025, Matton joined National League South side Tonbridge Angels on loan. He went on to make six appearances for the club before the loan was cut short in October. On 11 November 2025, after returning to Wycombe, Matton made his first-team debut in a 3–0 EFL Trophy win away to Gillingham, marking the occasion with a goal in the 61st minute.

On 14 February 2026, Matton joined Southern League Premier Division South side, Hanwell Town on a one-month loan, making his debut on the same day during a 3–0 defeat against Wimborne Town.

On 12 June 2026, Matton joined National League club Aldershot Town on a season-long loan deal.

== Career statistics ==
As of 14 November 2026

Appearances and goals by club, season and competition
Club	Season	League			FA Cup		EFL Cup		Other		Total	
Club	Season	Division	Apps	Goals	Apps	Goals	Apps	Goals	Apps	Goals	Apps	Goals
Woking	2023–24	National League	0	0	0	0	—		0	0	0	0
Binfield (dual-reg.)	2023–24	Isthmian League South Central Division	10	2	—		—		—		10	2
Wycombe Wanderers	2024–25	League One	0	0	0	0	0	0	0	0	0	0
Wycombe Wanderers	2025–26	League One	1	0	0	0	0	0	1 (Note: Appearance(s) in EFL Trophy)	1	2	1
Wycombe Wanderers	2026–27	League One	0	0	0	0	0	0	0	0	0	0
Wycombe Wanderers	Total		1	0	0	0	0	0	1	1	2	1
Bracknell Town (loan)	2024–25	Southern League Premier Division South	26	2	—		—		—		26	2
Tonbridge Angels (loan)	2025–26	National League South	4	0	2	0	—		0	0	6	0
Hanwell Town (loan)	2025–26	Southern League Premier Division South	12	0	—		—		—		12	0
Aldershot Town (loan)	2026–27	National League	6	0	1	0	—		4 (Note: Appearance(s) in National League Cup)	0	11	0
Career total			59	4	3	0	0	0	5	1	67	5
