= Joe Low =

Welsh footballer (born 2002)

Personal information
- Full name: Joseph David Low
- Date of birth: 20 February 2002 (age 24)
- Place of birth: Cardiff, Wales
- Height: 1.96 m (6 ft 5 in)
- Position: Centre-back

Team information
- Current team: Huddersfield Town
- Number: 5

Youth career
- 2009–2019: Bristol City

Senior career*
Years	Team	Apps	(Gls)
2019–2023	Bristol City	1	(0)
2019	→ Dorchester Town (loan)	3	(0)
2019	→ Frome Town (loan)	4	(1)
2019–2020	→ Yate Town (loan)	12	(1)
2021	→ Eastleigh (loan)	8	(0)
2023	→ Walsall (loan)	15	(1)
2023–2025	Wycombe Wanderers	72	(8)
2025–	Huddersfield Town	28	(2)

International career^{‡}
2018	Wales U17	3	(0)
2023–2024	Wales U21	6	(3)
2023–	Wales	2	(0)
- * Club domestic league appearances and goals as of 1 May 2026 (UTC) ‡ National team caps and goals as of 19:42, 10 September 2024 (BST)

Joseph David Low (born 20 February 2002) is a Welsh professional footballer who plays as a centre-back for EFL League One club Huddersfield Town and the Wales national team.

== Club career ==
=== Bristol City ===
Low joined the youth academy of Bristol City, and worked his way up all their youth categories. In February 2019, he had a short loan with Dorchester Town. Then in March 2019, he had another short loan spell with Frome Town. He spent the 2019-20 winter on loan with Yate Town, where he scored one goal in 12 appearances.

On 10 August 2020, Low signed his first professional contract with his parent club Bristol City. He then moved to Eastleigh on loan at the beginning of the 2021–22 season, but was recalled to Bristol City after several strong performances. He made his professional debut as a late substitute with Bristol City in a 1–1 EFL Championship tie with Middlesbrough on 5 November 2022.

==== Walsall (loan) ====
On 4 January 2023, Low signed for League Two club Walsall on loan until the end of the 2022–23 season.

=== Wycombe Wanderers ===
On 18 July 2023, Low made a permanent move to League One club Wycombe Wanderers for an undisclosed fee. He made his debut for Wycombe on 8 August 2023 in the 2-0 EFL Cup first round win against Milton Keynes Dons. Low scored his first two goals for Wycombe on 15 August 2023 in the 3-2 EFL League One win against Leyton Orient.

=== Huddersfield Town ===
On 11 June 2025, Huddersfield Town announced that they had signed Low and Low would join on 1 July 2025.

== International career ==
Born in Cardiff, Low is a youth international for Wales having been called up to the U19s.

On 26 March 2023 Low made his debut for the Wales national under-21 football team in a friendly match against Scotland in Spain, scoring the second goal in Wales' 3–0 win.

Low was called up to the Wales senior squad for the Euro 2024 qualifying matches against Armenia and Turkey on 16 and 20 June 2023. On 8 October 2023, Low was called up again to the Senior Squad for a Friendly against Gibraltar and a Qualifying match against Croatia, replacing Injured Ben Cabango. He made his senior international debut on 11 October 2023, starting against Gibraltar and facing off against his club teammate Tjay De Barr.

== Personal life ==
Low is the son of the retired footballer and Wales youth international Josh Low.

== Career statistics ==
As of match played 21 April 2025

Appearances and goals by club, season and competition
Club	Season	League			FA Cup		League Cup		Other		Total	
Club	Season	Division	Apps	Goals	Apps	Goals	Apps	Goals	Apps	Goals	Apps	Goals
Bristol City	2018–19	Championship	0	0	0	0	0	0	—		0	0
Bristol City	2019–20	Championship	0	0	0	0	0	0	—		0	0
Bristol City	2020–21	Championship	0	0	0	0	0	0	—		0	0
Bristol City	2021–22	Championship	0	0	0	0	0	0	—		0	0
Bristol City	2022–23	Championship	1	0	0	0	1	0	—		2	0
Bristol City	Total		1	0	0	0	1	0	0	0	2	0
Dorchester Town (loan)	2018–19	Southern Premier Division South	3	0	0	0	0	0	0	0	3	0
Frome Town (loan)	2018–19	Southern Premier Division South	4	1	0	0	0	0	0	0	4	1
Yate Town (loan)	2019–20	Southern Premier Division South	12	1	0	0	0	0	0	0	12	1
Eastleigh (loan)	2021–22	National League	8	0	0	0	0	0	0	0	8	0
Walsall (loan)	2022–23	League Two	15	1	1	0	0	0	0	0	16	1
Wycombe Wanderers	2023–24	League One	34	4	2	0	2	0	3 (Note: Appearances in EFL Trophy)	0	41	4
Wycombe Wanderers	2024–25	League One	38	4	1	0	3	0	—		42	4
Wycombe Wanderers	Total		72	8	3	0	5	0	3	0	83	8
Career total			115	11	4	0	6	0	3	0	128	11

== Honours ==
Wycombe Wanderers

- EFL Trophy runner-up: 2023–24
