= Taylor Clark =

English footballer (born 2005)

- Clark in 2026

Personal information
- Full name: Taylor Boyd Clark
- Date of birth: 17 May 2005 (age 21)
- Place of birth: Colchester, England
- Positions: Defender; midfielder

Team information
- Current team: Billericay Town

Youth career
- West Ham United
- Ipswich Town

Senior career*
Years	Team	Apps	(Gls)
2021–2023	Needham Market	31	(1)
2023–2025	Wycombe Wanderers	0	(0)
2024	→ Farnborough (loan)	20	(1)
2024–2025	→ Farnborough (loan)	23	(2)
2025	→ Wealdstone (loan)	2	(0)
2025	→ Slough Town (loan)	6	(0)
2025–2026	Chelmsford City	17	(1)
2026	→ Hampton & Richmond Borough (loan)	11	(0)
2026–	Billericay Town	0	(0)
- * Club domestic league appearances and goals as of 00:50, 21 May 2026 (UTC)

Taylor Boyd Clark (born 17 May 2005) is an English professional footballer who plays as a defender and midfielder for Billericay Town.

== Career ==
=== Early career ===
After playing youth football for West Ham United and Ipswich Town. He then played in non-League football for Needham Market, playing for the first-team at the age of 16. He trialled with Aston Villa in early 2022. Following a successful trial, Clark signed for Wycombe Wanderers in August 2023.

=== Wycombe Wanderers ===
Clark made his first-team debut for Wycombe on 19 September 2023, coming on as an 86th-minute substitute for Kieran Sadlier in a 1–0 win over Crystal Palace U21 at Adams Park.

On 5 January 2024, Clark joined National League South side, Farnborough on a one-month loan. His loan was eventually extended until the end of the campaign, as Farnborough narrowly missed out on a play-off place. He featured twenty times in all competitions, scoring once before returning to the club for a second loan spell in July later that year until January 2025.

On 20 January 2025, Clark joined National League side Wealdstone on loan for the remainder of the season.

On 14 March 2025, following a premature end to his time at Wealdstone, Clark opted to return to the National League South to join Slough Town on loan for the remainder of the campaign.

=== Chelmsford City ===
On 27 May 2025, following his release from Wycombe, Clark signed for Chelmsford City.

On 15 January 2026, fellow National League South side Hampton & Richmond Borough announced that Clark had signed on loan for the remainder of the 2025−26 season.

On 21 May 2026, Chelmsford announced Clark had left the club.

=== Billericay Town ===
In July 2026 he signed for Billericay Town.

== Career statistics ==
As of match played 25 January 2025

Appearances and goals by club, season and competition
Club	Season	League			FA Cup		EFL Cup		Other		Total	
Club	Season	Division	Apps	Goals	Apps	Goals	Apps	Goals	Apps	Goals	Apps	Goals
Needham Market	2021–22	Southern League Premier Division Central	16	1	0	0	—		4 (Note: One appearance in the Southern League Cup, three in the FA Trophy)	0	20	1
Needham Market	2022–23	Southern League Premier Division Central	15	0	2	0	—		0	0	17	0
Needham Market	Total		31	1	2	0	—		4	0	37	1
Wycombe Wanderers	2023–24	League One	0	0	0	0	0	0	2 (Note: Appearances in the EFL Trophy)	0	2	0
Wycombe Wanderers	2024–25	League One	0	0	—		0	0	1	0	1	0
Wycombe Wanderers	Total		0	0	0	0	0	0	3	0	3	0
Farnborough (loan)	2023–24	National League South	20	1	—		—		—		20	1
Farnborough (loan)	2024–25	National League South	23	1	1	0	—		1 (Note: Appearance in the FA Trophy)	0	25	1
Farnborough (loan)	Total		43	2	1	0	—		1	0	45	2
Wealdstone (loan)	2024–25	National League	2	0	—		—		1 (Note: Appearance in the National League Cup)	0	3	0
Slough Town (loan)	2024–25	National League South	0	0	—		—		—		0	0
Career total			76	3	3	0	0	0	9	0	88	3
