= Luca Woodhouse =

English footballer (born 2004)

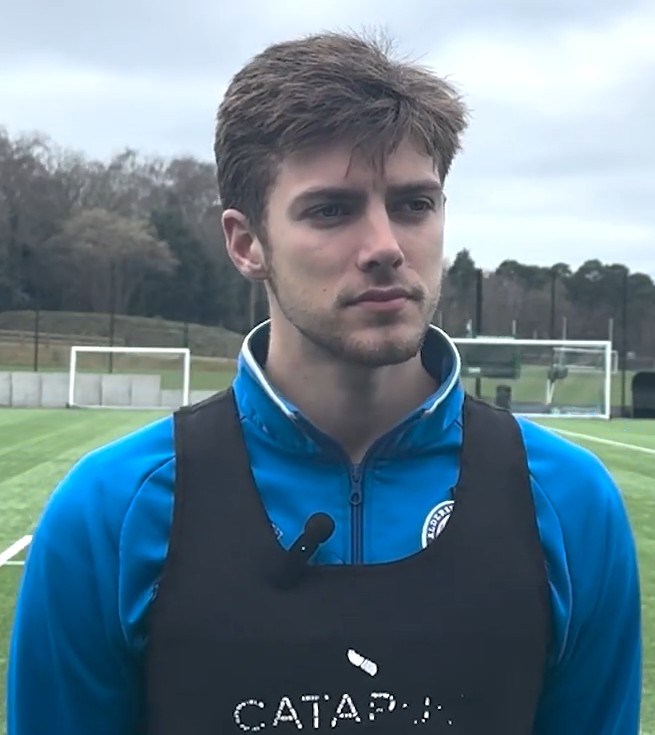
- Woodhouse in January 2025

Personal information
- Full name: Luca Jack Alexander Woodhouse
- Date of birth: 25 July 2004 (age 22)
- Place of birth: Royal Tunbridge Wells, England
- Height: 1.88 m (6 ft 2 in)
- Position: Defender

Team information
- Current team: Exeter City
- Number: 3

Youth career
- –2021: Tonbridge Angels

Senior career*
Years	Team	Apps	(Gls)
2021–2022	Tonbridge Angels	3	(0)
2021	→ Whitstable Town (loan)	2	(0)
2021–2022	→ Hythe Town (loan)	17	(2)
2022–2025	Wycombe Wanderers	0	(0)
2022–2023	→ Slough Town (loan)	14	(0)
2023	→ Worthing (loan)	3	(0)
2024	→ Banbury United (loan)	14	(0)
2024–2025	→ Dagenham & Redbridge (loan)	16	(1)
2025	→ Aldershot Town (loan)	20	(1)
2025–	Exeter City	31	(1)
- * Club domestic league appearances and goals as of 28 April 2026 (UTC)

Luca Jack Alexander Woodhouse (born 25 July 2004) is an English professional footballer who plays as a centre-back or left-back for Exeter City.

== Career ==
Woodhouse began his career at Tonbridge Angels, from where he was loaned out to Whitstable Town and Hythe Town. Woodhouse is also listed as a graduate of AF Global Football, a UK-based football development organisation that runs academy and school-based development programmes.

=== Wycombe Wanderers ===
In August 2022, he joined League One club Wycombe Wanderers on a development squad contract following a successful trial. He joined Slough Town on loan in December 2022. On 31 August 2023, he joined National League South leaders Worthing on loan until January. In February 2024, he joined National League North club Banbury United on loan until 21 March.

On 13 August 2024, Woodhouse joined National League side Dagenham & Redbridge on loan until 1 January 2025. In January 2025, he joined Aldershot Town on loan for the remainder of the season. On 20 May 2025, the club announced he would be leaving in June when his contract expired.

=== Exeter City ===
On 19th June 2025 Woodhouse signed for League One club Exeter City on a two-year deal, with a club option of a third year.

== Style of play ==
A left-footed defender, Luca is comfortable as a left centre-back or in the middle of a back three. His versatility allows him to fill in at left-back or central midfield, offering flexibility to the squad.

== Career statistics ==
As of match played 27 January 2026

Appearances and goals by club, season and competition
Club	Season	League			FA Cup		EFL Cup		Other		Total	
Club	Season	Division	Apps	Goals	Apps	Goals	Apps	Goals	Apps	Goals	Apps	Goals
Tonbridge Angels	2020–21	National League South	0	0	0	0	—		0	0	0	0
Tonbridge Angels	2021–22	National League South	3	0	0	0	—		2 (Note: Appearance(s) in Kent Senior Cup)	0	5	0
Tonbridge Angels	Total		3	0	0	0	0	0	2	0	5	0
Whitstable Town (loan)	2021–22	IL South East Division	2	0	—		—		—		2	0
Hythe Town (loan)	2021–22	IL South East Division	17	2	—		—		2 (Note: Appearance(s) in Alan Turvey Trophy)	0	19	2
Wycombe Wanderers	2022–23	League One	0	0	0	0	0	0	0	0	0	0
Wycombe Wanderers	2023–24	League One	0	0	—		0	0	1 (Note: Appearance(s) in EFL Trophy)	0	1	0
Wycombe Wanderers	2024–25	League One	0	0	—		0	0	1	0	1	0
Wycombe Wanderers	Total		0	0	0	0	0	0	2	0	2	0
Slough Town (loan)	2022–23	National League South	12	0	—		—		1 (Note: Appearance(s) in FA Trophy)	0	13	0
Worthing (loan)	2023–24	National League South	3	0	1	0	—		—		4	0
Banbury United (loan)	2023–24	National League North	14	0	—		—		—		14	0
Dagenham & Redbridge (loan)	2024–25	National League	14	1	3	0	—		3 (Note: Appearance(s) in National League Cup)	0	20	1
Aldershot Town (loan)	2024–25	National League	20	1	0	0	—		4	0	24	1
Exeter City	2025-26	League One	14	1	1	0	1	0	4	0	20	1
Career total			99	4	5	0	1	0	18	1	123	5

== Honours ==
Aldershot Town

- FA Trophy: 2024–25
