= Franco Ravizzoli =

Argentinian footballer (born 1997)

Personal information
- Full name: Franco Nahuel Ravizzoli
- Date of birth: 9 July 1997 (age 29)
- Place of birth: Mar del Plata, Argentina
- Height: 1.88 m (6 ft 2 in)
- Position: Goalkeeper

Team information
- Current team: Leicester City
- Number: 21

Youth career
- Independiente
- Quilmes
- 2012–2018: River Plate

Senior career*
Years	Team	Apps	(Gls)
- Deportivo Merlo
- Deportivo Morón
2020–2021	Eastbourne Borough	29	(0)
2021–2023	Milton Keynes Dons	1	(0)
2023–2025	Wycombe Wanderers	41	(0)
2025–2026	Blackpool	4	(0)
2026–	Leicester City	0	(0)
- * Club domestic league appearances and goals as of 20:27, 6 October 2026 (UTC)

Franco Nahuel Ravizzoli (born 9 July 1997) is an Argentinian professional footballer who plays as a goalkeeper for EFL League One club Leicester City.

== Club career ==
=== Early career ===
Born in Mar del Plata, Buenos Aires Province, Ravizzoli played for the Independiente and Quilmes youth teams before joining the academy of River Plate towards the end of 2012 at the age of 15, where he progressed through the ranks eventually reaching the senior reserve team. After leaving the club in mid-2018, Ravizzoli played for Deportivo Merlo and Deportivo Morón, and trained with Spanish club Valencia.

=== Eastbourne Borough ===
In January 2020, Ravizzoli signed for English sixth-tier club Eastbourne Borough. He featured a total of 35 times for the club across the 2019–20 and 2020–21 seasons.

=== Milton Keynes Dons ===
On 16 June 2021, Ravizzoli signed a professional contract with League One club Milton Keynes Dons having spent the latter half of the 2020–21 season training with the team. On 31 July 2021, he made his debut in an EFL Cup first round 5–0 defeat away to AFC Bournemouth. On 11 January 2022, Ravizzoli made his first league start in a 1–0 home win over rivals AFC Wimbledon, keeping a clean sheet in the process.

At the conclusion of the 2022–23 season, Ravizzoli was one of nine players released by Milton Keynes Dons following their relegation to EFL League Two.

=== Wycombe Wanderers ===
On 14 September 2023, Ravizzoli signed for League One side Wycombe Wanderers. He was offered a new contract by Wycombe at the end of the 2023–24 season.

On 20 May 2025, the club announced he would be leaving in June when his contract expired.

=== Blackpool ===
On 27 June 2025, it was announced that Ravizzoli would join Blackpool on 1 July, upon the expiration of his Wycombe contract, after signing a two-year contract with the option for a further 12 months. He made his debut for the club in a 5–0 victory over Barrow in the EFL Trophy on 16 September.

=== Leicester City ===
On 10 August 2026, Ravizzoli signed for fellow League One club Leicester City on a free transfer.

== Career statistics ==
As of match played 6 November 2026

Club	Season	League			FA Cup		League Cup		Other		Total	
Club	Season	Division	Apps	Goals	Apps	Goals	Apps	Goals	Apps	Goals	Apps	Goals
Eastbourne Borough	2019–20	National League South	10	0	0	0	—		2 (Note: Appearance(s) in Sussex Senior Challenge Cup)	0	12	0
Eastbourne Borough	2020–21	National League South	19	0	4	0	—		0	0	23	0
Eastbourne Borough	Total		29	0	4	0	0	0	2	0	35	0
Milton Keynes Dons	2021–22	League One	1	0	0	0	1	0	4 (Note: Appearance(s) in EFL Trophy)	0	6	0
Milton Keynes Dons	2022–23	League One	0	0	1	0	0	0	2	0	3	0
Milton Keynes Dons	Total		1	0	1	0	1	0	6	0	9	0
Wycombe Wanderers	2023–24	League One	14	0	1	0	0	0	6	0	21	0
Wycombe Wanderers	2024–25	League One	27	0	0	0	2	0	2 (Note: One appearance in the EFL Trophy and one appearance in the League One play-offs)	0	31	0
Wycombe Wanderers	Total		41	0	1	0	2	0	8	0	52	0
Blackpool	2025–26	League One	4	0	0	0	0	0	4	0	8	0
Leicester City	2026–27	League One	0	0	1	0	0	0	2	0	3	0
Career total			75	0	7	0	3	0	22	0	107	0

== Honours ==
Wycombe Wanderers

- EFL Trophy runner-up: 2023–24
