= Gideon Kodua =

English footballer (born 2004)

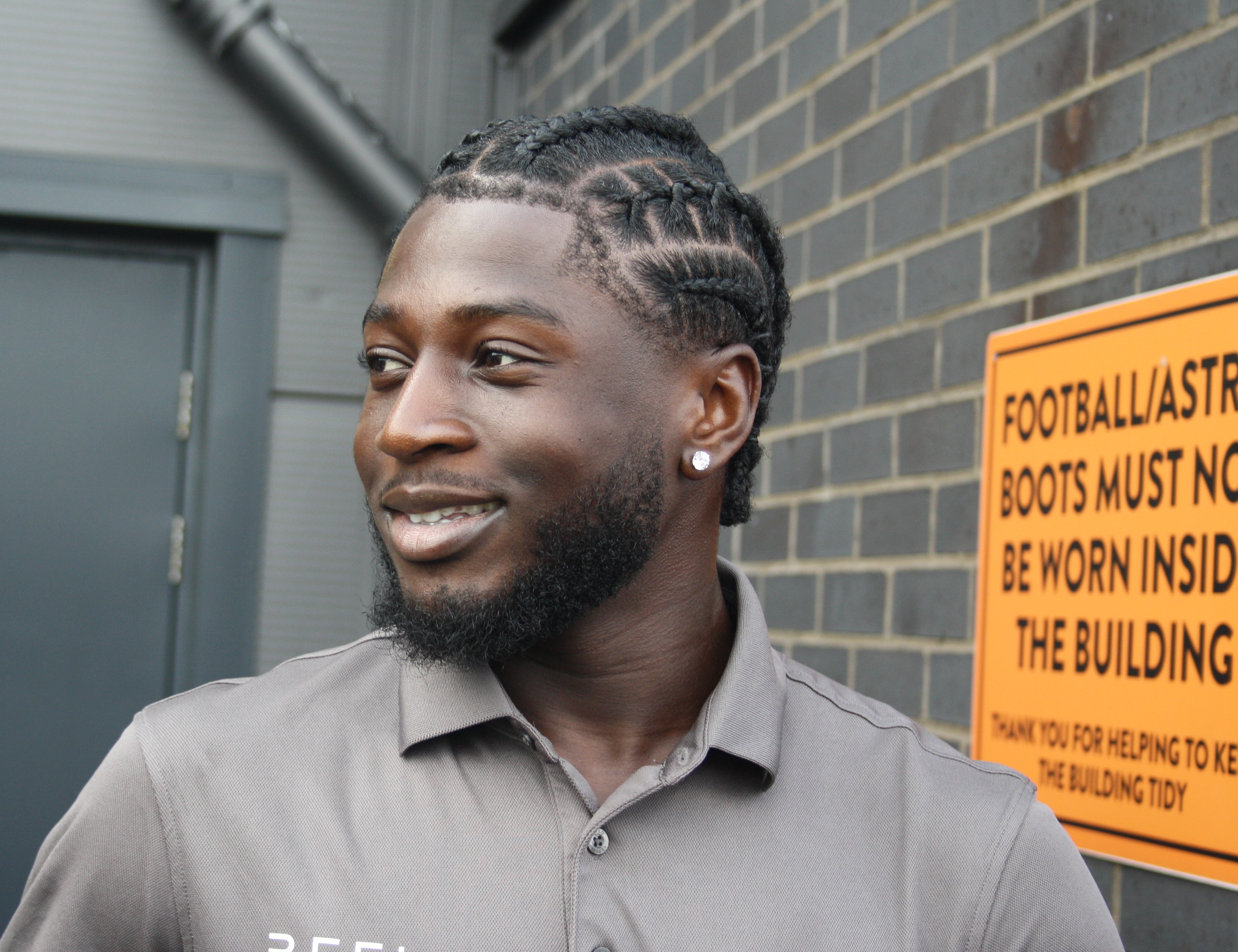
- Kodua in 2026

Personal information
- Full name: Gideon Nana Kwame Fosu Kodua
- Date of birth: 2 October 2004 (age 22)
- Place of birth: Newham, England
- Height: 5 ft 10 in (1.78 m)
- Position: Winger

Team information
- Current team: Luton Town
- Number: 30

Youth career
- 2017–2023: West Ham United

Senior career*
Years	Team	Apps	(Gls)
2023–2026	West Ham United	0	(0)
2024	→ Wycombe Wanderers (loan)	10	(0)
2024–2025	→ Wycombe Wanderers (loan)	20	(2)
2025–2026	→ Luton Town (loan)	24	(9)
2026–	Luton Town	21	(1)
- * Club domestic league appearances and goals as of 07:48, 24 September 2026 (UTC)

Gideon Nana Kwame Fosu Kodua (born 2 October 2004) is an English professional footballer who plays as a winger for EFL League One club Luton Town.

== Career ==
=== West Ham United ===
==== Youth career ====
Born in Newham in London, Kodua joined the West Ham United academy in 2017, having been scouted playing for the Newham District side. He signed his first professional contract with the club in December 2022.

Kodua was captain of the West Ham team which won the 2023 FA Youth Cup by defeating Arsenal 5–1 at the Emirates Stadium in April 2023, scoring the third goal on the day.

Playing for West Ham's under-21's during the first half of the 2023–24 season, he scored seven goals in 17 appearances across all competitions including a goal against Wycombe Wanderers in the EFL Trophy on 9 January 2024.

==== Wycombe Wanderers loan ====
On 12 January 2024, he joined Wycombe Wanderers on a six-month loan.

Kodua made his debut for Wycombe on 23 January, coming on in second-half added time for Kieran Sadlier in a 1–0 defeat to Wigan Athletic.

His loan ended at the end of the 2023–24 season but Kodua rejoined Wycombe Wanderers, on loan in August 2024, for the remainder of the 2024–25 season. Kodua scored his first goal for Wycombe on 22 October 2023. Playing Burton Albion at Pirelli Stadium, Kodua scored the first goal of the game in an eventual 3–2 win for Wycombe Wanderers.

=== Luton Town ===
On 22 July 2025, Kodua signed on loan for League One club, Luton Town for the 2025–26 season. An option to buy was included, which was activated on 6 February 2026, after scoring 10 goals in his first 31 appearances for the club.

Kodua was a substitute in the 2026 EFL Trophy final, where Luton Town achieved a 3–1 win over Stockport County.

== Personal life ==
Kodua is of Ghanaian descent. His elder brother, Joel, is a professional boxer.

== Career statistics ==
As of match played 3 October 2026

Appearances and goals by club, season and competition
Club	Season	League			FA Cup		EFL Cup		Other		Total	
Club	Season	Division	Apps	Goals	Apps	Goals	Apps	Goals	Apps	Goals	Apps	Goals
West Ham United U21	2022–23	—			—		—		1 (Note: Appearance(s) in EFL Trophy)	0	1	0
West Ham United U21	2023–24	—			—		—		5	2	5	2
West Ham United U21	Total		—		—		—		6	2	6	2
West Ham United	2023–24	Premier League	0	0	0	0	0	0	0	0	0	0
West Ham United	2024–25	Premier League	0	0	0	0	0	0	—		0	0
West Ham United	2025–26	Premier League	0	0	0	0	0	0	—		0	0
West Ham United	Total		0	0	0	0	0	0	0	0	0	0
Wycombe Wanderers (loan)	2023–24	League One	10	0	0	0	0	0	0	0	10	0
Wycombe Wanderers (loan)	2024–25	League One	20	2	3	1	1	0	1 (Note: Appearance(s) in EFL League One play-offs)	0	25	3
Wycombe Wanderers (loan)	Total		30	2	3	1	1	0	1	0	35	3
Luton Town (loan)	2025–26	League One	24	9	2	1	1	0	4	0	31	10
Luton Town	2025–26	League One	14	0	0	0	0	0	3	0	17	0
Luton Town	2026–27	League One	7	1	0	0	2	1	2	0	11	2
Luton Town	Total		21	1	0	0	2	1	5	0	28	2
Career total			75	12	5	2	4	1	16	2	100	17

== Honours ==
West Ham United U18

- FA Youth Cup: 2022–23
- U18 Premier League South: 2023

Luton Town

- EFL Trophy: 2025–26
