= Jack Young (footballer, born 2000) =

English footballer

Personal information
- Full name: Jack Young
- Date of birth: 21 October 2000 (age 26)
- Place of birth: Morpeth, England
- Position: Midfielder

Team information
- Current team: Worthing
- Number: 23

Youth career
- 2007–2020: Newcastle United

Senior career*
Years	Team	Apps	(Gls)
2020–2022	Newcastle United	0	(0)
2020–2021	→ Tranmere Rovers (loan)	5	(0)
2022	→ Wycombe Wanderers (loan)	2	(0)
2022–2025	Wycombe Wanderers	1	(0)
2023–2024	→ Ayr United (loan)	17	(0)
2024	→ Wealdstone (loan)	12	(1)
2024–2025	→ Dorking Wanderers (loan)	32	(3)
2025–2026	Farnborough	12	(0)
2025–2026	→ Dorking Wanderers (loan)	7	(2)
2026	Worthing	17	(0)
- * Club domestic league appearances and goals as of 20:20, 6 May 2026 (UTC)

Jack Young (born 21 October 2000) is an English professional footballer who plays as a midfielder for National League club Worthing.

== Career ==
Born in Morpeth, Northumberland, Young began his career at Newcastle United at the age of 7, before turning professional in 2019. He moved on loan to Tranmere Rovers in October 2020. After making five appearances, Young returned to Newcastle.

In January 2022, Young joined League One club Wycombe Wanderers on loan for the remainder of the season, being recalled by Newcastle in March after just two league appearances. However, he subsequently signed a three-year permanent deal with Wycombe in April 2022. In August 2023 he moved on loan to Scottish club Ayr United, returning to Wycombe in January 2024 following the expiration of his deal. On 16 February 2024, Young joined National League club Wealdstone on loan for the remainder of the season. In October 2024, he joined National League South side Dorking Wanderers on loan until January 2025. He departed the Chairboys upon the expiry of his contract at the end of the 2024–25 season.

On 20 September 2025, Young joined National League South club Farnborough. On 1 December 2025, it was agreed that while Young was considering a move back to the North of England, he would rejoin Dorking Wanderers on loan until mid-January.

On 29 January 2026, following his departure from Farnborough, Young joined Worthing. On 6 May 2026, it was announced that Young would leave the club at the end of his contract in June.

== Career statistics ==
As of 25 April 2026

Appearances and goals by club, season and competition
Club	Season	League			National Cup (Note: Includes Scottish Cup)		League Cup		Other		Total	
Club	Season	Division	Apps	Goals	Apps	Goals	Apps	Goals	Apps	Goals	Apps	Goals
Newcastle United U21	2019–20	—			—		—		3 (Note: Appearance(s) in EFL Trophy)	0	3	0
Newcastle United U21	2020–21	—			—		—		2	0	2	0
Newcastle United U21	2021–22	—			—		—		3	0	3	0
Newcastle United U21	Total				—		—		8	0	8	0
Tranmere Rovers (loan)	2020–21	League Two	5	0	0	0	0	0	0	0	5	0
Wycombe Wanderers (loan)	2021–22	League One	2	0	—		—		—		2	0
Wycombe Wanderers	2022–23	League One	1	0	0	0	2	0	3	0	6	0
Wycombe Wanderers	2023–24	League One	0	0	0	0	0	0	0	0	0	0
Wycombe Wanderers	2024–25	League One	0	0	0	0	0	0	0	0	0	0
Wycombe Wanderers	Total		3	0	0	0	2	0	3	0	8	0
Ayr United (loan)	2023–24	Scottish Championship	17	0	1	0	0	0	1 (Note: Appearance(s) in Scottish Challenge Cup)	0	19	0
Wealdstone (loan)	2023–24	National League	12	1	—		—		—		12	1
Dorking Wanderers (loan)	2024–25	National League South	32	3	0	0	—		1 (Note: Appearance(s) in FA Trophy)	0	33	3
Farnborough	2025–26	National League South	12	0	2	0	—		1	0	15	0
Dorking Wanderers (loan)	2025–26	National League South	7	2	—		—		—		7	2
Worthing	2025–26	National League South	17	0	—		—		—		17	0
Career total			105	6	3	0	2	0	14	0	124	6
