= Jasper Pattenden =

English footballer (born 2002)

Personal information
- Full name: Jasper Ernest Pattenden
- Date of birth: 15 April 2002 (age 24)
- Place of birth: Worthing, England
- Height: 1.73 m (5 ft 8 in)
- Positions: Full back; winger

Team information
- Current team: Stevenage
- Number: 17

Youth career
- –2018: Brighton & Hove Albion

Senior career*
Years	Team	Apps	(Gls)
2018–2022	Worthing	61	(12)
2022–2025	Wycombe Wanderers	24	(0)
2022–2023	→ Dorking Wanderers (loan)	3	(0)
2025–	Stevenage	29	(0)
- * Club domestic league appearances and goals as of 01:40, 15 July 2026 (UTC)

Jasper Ernest Pattenden (born 15 April 2002) is an English professional footballer who plays as a midfielder or full back for EFL League One club Stevenage.

== Career ==
Pattenden began his career with Brighton & Hove Albion as a youth player, before moving to Worthing in 2018, where he made his debut in the FA Trophy against Burgess Hill Town.

Pattenden joined Wycombe Wanderers in July 2022. He made his professional debut on 9 August 2022, playing the whole of Wycombe's 2-1 win at Northampton Town in the EFL Cup first round. He made his league debut on 16 August in a 3–1 defeat to Exeter City. On 15 November 2022, Pattenden joined National League club Dorking Wanderers on loan until 3 January 2023.

On 11 July 2025, Pattenden signed for fellow League One club Stevenage.

== Career statistics ==
As of end of 2025–26 season

Appearances and goals by club, season and competition
Club	Season	League			FA Cup		EFL Cup		Other		Total	
Club	Season	Division	Apps	Goals	Apps	Goals	Apps	Goals	Apps	Goals	Apps	Goals
Worthing	2018–19	Isthmian League Premier Division	7	1	0	0	—		2 (Note: One appearance in the FA Trophy; one appearance in the Alan Turvey Trophy)	0	9	1
Worthing	2019–20	Isthmian League Premier Division	13	2	3	0	—		4 (Note: One appearance in the Sussex Senior Challenge Cup; three appearances and one goal in the Alan Turvey Trophy)	1	20	3
Worthing	2020–21	Isthmian League Premier Division	8	1	1	0	—		2 (Note: One appearance in the FA Trophy; one appearance in the Sussex Senior Challenge Cup)	0	11	1
Worthing	2021–22	Isthmian League Premier Division	33	8	1	0	—		5 (Note: Two appearances in the FA Trophy; three appearances and two goals in the Sussex Senior Challenge Cup)	2	39	10
Worthing	Total		61	12	5	0	—		13	3	79	15
Wycombe Wanderers	2022–23	League One	3	0	0	0	2	0	3 (Note: Appearance(s) in EFL Trophy)	0	8	0
Wycombe Wanderers	2023—24	League One	8	0	2	0	0	0	4	0	14	0
Wycombe Wanderers	2024–25	League One	13	0	1	0	3	0	2	0	19	0
Wycombe Wanderers	Total		24	0	3	0	5	0	9	0	41	0
Dorking Wanderers (loan)	2022–23	National League	3	0	0	0	—		0	0	3	0
Stevenage	2025–26	League One	29	0	1	0	1	0	6 (Note: Four appearances in the EFL Trophy, two appearances in the League One play-offs)	0	37	0
Stevenage	2026–27	League One	0	0	0	0	0	0	0	0	0	0
Stevenage	Total		29	0	1	0	1	0	6	0	37	0
Career total			117	12	9	2	6	0	28	3	160	15
