= D'Mani Mellor =

Footballer (born 2000)

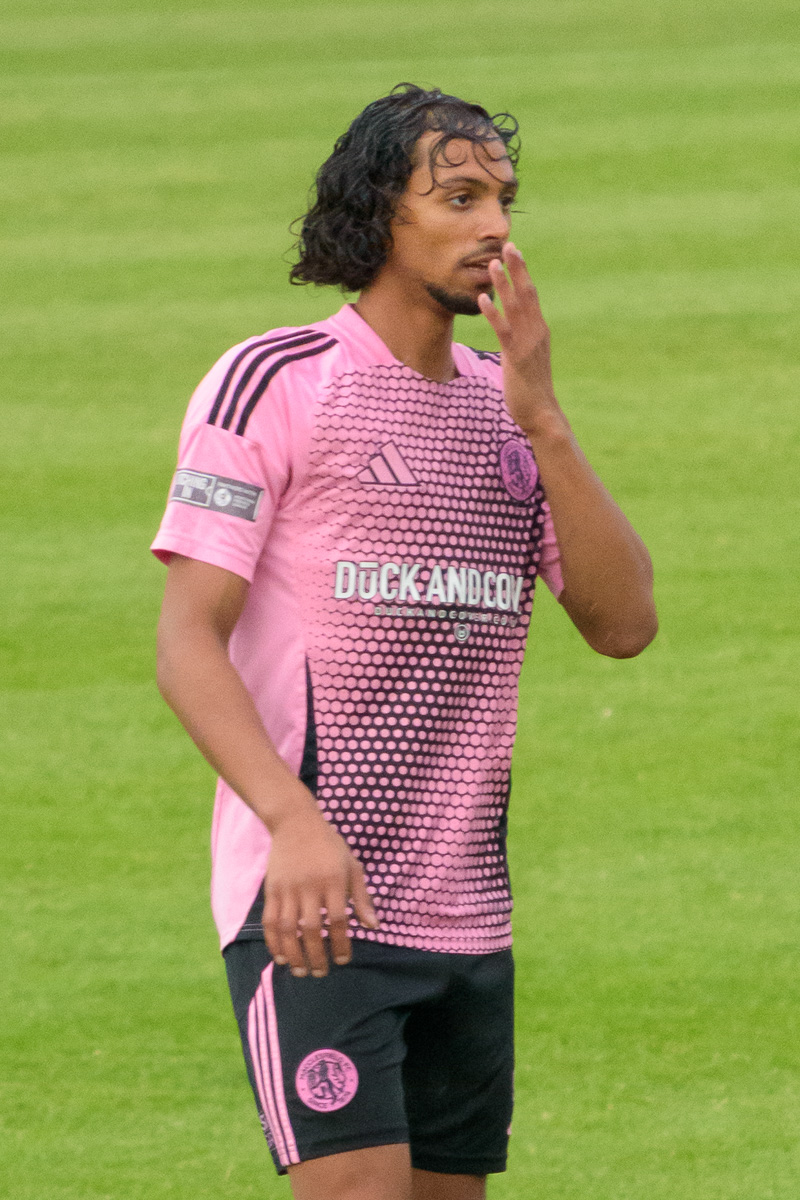
- Mellor with Macclesfield in 2025

Personal information
- Full name: D'Mani Lucell Bughail-Mellor
- Date of birth: 20 September 2000 (age 26)
- Place of birth: Manchester, England
- Height: 1.87 m (6 ft 2 in)
- Position: Forward

Team information
- Current team: Forest Green Rovers.
- Number: 9

Youth career
- –2019: Manchester United

Senior career*
Years	Team	Apps	(Gls)
2019–2022	Manchester United	0	(0)
2021–2022	→ Salford City (loan)	3	(0)
2022–2024	Wycombe Wanderers	9	(0)
2023	→ Rochdale (loan)	19	(0)
2023–2024	→ Sutton United (loan)	5	(0)
2024	→ Rochdale (loan)	9	(1)
2024	Gateshead	0	(0)
2024–2026	Macclesfield	68	(29)
2026–	Forest Green Rovers	8	(0)

International career^{‡}
2026–	Yemen	3	(0)
- * Club domestic league appearances and goals as of 19 September 2026 ‡ National team caps and goals as of 30 September 2026

D'Mani Lucell Bughail-Mellor (Arabic: ديماني لوسيل البغيلي; born 20 September 2000) is a professional footballer who plays as a forward for Forest Green Rovers. Born in England, he plays for the Yemen national team.

A Manchester United player from the age of eight, Mellor made his first-team debut in a UEFA Europa League match in November 2019. He spent time on loan at Salford City during the 2021–22 season. In July 2022, Mellor signed for Wycombe Wanderers after being released by United.

== Club career ==
=== Manchester United ===
Mellor joined Manchester United at the age of eight. He made his senior debut in a Europa League match against Astana on 28 November 2019. In August 2020, Mellor revealed he had suffered a serious knee injury, which resulted in him being unable to play at all in the 2020–21 season.

In August 2021, he moved to League Two club Salford City on loan. In January 2022, Mellor was recalled early from Salford after making three substitute appearances in an injury-hit spell. Later that month, United were criticised by Crawley Town manager John Yems, who claimed that a loan deal for Mellor collapsed before the transfer deadline because of paperwork issues. In May 2022, he announced that he would be leaving United upon the expiry of his contract in the summer.

=== Wycombe Wanderers ===
On 4 July 2022, Mellor signed for Wycombe Wanderers.

On 27 January 2023, Mellor joined League Two club Rochdale on loan until the end of the season. On 23 April 2023, after Rochdale had been relegated, the club said it was investigating an alleged incident of racist abuse aimed at Mellor following a game at Stockport County.

On 11 August 2023, Mellor joined League Two club Sutton United on loan until January 2024. He was recalled from his loan in January 2024, before returning to National League club Rochdale on loan until the end of the season.

On 2 May 2024, Wycombe announced the player would be released in the summer when his contract expired.

=== Gateshead ===
In August 2024, Mellor signed for National League side Gateshead on a short-term deal.

=== Macclesfield ===
On 5 September 2024, he joined NPL Premier Division club Macclesfield.

== Career statistics ==
As of end of 2024–25 season

Appearances and goals by club, season and competition
Club	Season	League			FA Cup		EFL Cup		Europe		Other		Total	
Club	Season	Division	Apps	Goals	Apps	Goals	Apps	Goals	Apps	Goals	Apps	Goals	Apps	Goals
Manchester United U21	2019–20	—	—		—		—		—		3 (Note: Appearance(s) in the EFL Trophy)	0	3	0
Manchester United U21	2021–22	—	—		—		—		—		1	0	1	0
Manchester United U21	Total		—		—		—		—		4	0	4	0
Manchester United	2019–20	Premier League	0	0	0	0	0	0	1 (Note: Appearance in the UEFA Europa League)	0	—		1	0
Manchester United	2020–21	Premier League	0	0	0	0	0	0	0	0	—		0	0
Manchester United	2021–22	Premier League	0	0	0	0	0	0	0	0	—		0	0
Manchester United	Total		0	0	0	0	0	0	1	0	—		1	0
Salford City (loan)	2021–22	League Two	3	0	0	0	0	0	—		0	0	3	0
Wycombe Wanderers	2022–23	League One	9	0	1	0	1	1	—		1	0	12	1
Wycombe Wanderers	2023–24	League One	0	0	0	0	1	0	—		0	0	1	0
Wycombe Wanderers	Total		9	0	1	0	2	1	—		1	0	13	1
Rochdale (loan)	2022–23	League Two	19	0	—		—		—		—		19	0
Sutton United (loan)	2023–24	League Two	5	0	1	0	0	0	—		2	0	8	0
Rochdale (loan)	2023–24	National League	9	1	0	0	—		—		0	0	9	1
Macclesfield	2024–25	Northern Premier League; Premier Division	36	18	3	0	—		—		4 (Note: Appearance(s) in the FA Trophy)	2	43	20
Career total			81	19	5	0	2	1	1	0	11	2	100	22
