= Jack Wakely =

English footballer (born 2000)

Personal information
- Full name: Jack Sebastian Wakely
- Date of birth: 25 October 2000 (age 26)
- Height: 1.94 m (6 ft 4 in)
- Position: Defender

Youth career
- 2009–2018: Chelsea

Senior career*
Years	Team	Apps	(Gls)
2018–2021	Chelsea	0	(0)
2019	→ Basingstoke Town (loan)	15	(0)
2021	→ Brighton & Hove Albion (loan)	0	(0)
2021–2024	Wycombe Wanderers	3	(0)
2022–2023	→ Maidenhead United (loan)	7	(0)
2023	→ Ebbsfleet United (loan)	5	(0)
2024–2025	Ebbsfleet United	4	(0)
Total		34	(0)
- * Club domestic league appearances and goals

Jack Sebastian Wakely (born 25 October 2000) is an English former professional footballer who played as a defender.

== Career ==
Jack began his career at Chelsea at under-9 level, turning professional in 2017. He moved on loan to Basingstoke Town in January 2019, and to Brighton & Hove Albion in February 2021. He left Chelsea in the summer of 2021, signing with Wycombe Wanderers in July 2021. On 25 March 2022, Wakely joined National League side Maidenhead United on loan for the remainder of the 2021–22 season. Wakely joined Ebbsfleet United on loan for the entirety of the 2023–24 season.

He was released by Wycombe at the end of the 2023–24 season.

On 5 October 2024, Wakely signed for Ebbsfleet United. He retired from professional football in April 2025, at the age of 24.

== Career statistics ==
Appearances and goals by club, season and competition
Club	Season	League			FA Cup		EFL Cup		Other		Total	
Club	Season	Division	Apps	Goals	Apps	Goals	Apps	Goals	Apps	Goals	Apps	Goals
Chelsea	2018–19	Premier League	0	0	0	0	0	0	0	0	0	0
Chelsea	2019–20	Premier League	0	0	0	0	0	0	0	0	0	0
Chelsea	2020–21	Premier League	0	0	0	0	0	0	0	0	0	0
Chelsea	Total		0	0	0	0	0	0	0	0	0	0
Basingstoke Town (loan)	2018–19	SFL Premier Division South	15	0	—		—		—		15	0
Chelsea U23	2019–20	—			—		—		4 (Note: Appearance(s) in the EFL Trophy.)	0	4	0
Brighton & Hove Albion (loan)	2020–21	Premier League	0	0	0	0	0	0	—		0	0
Wycombe Wanderers	2021–22	League One	0	0	0	0	0	0	1	0	1	0
Wycombe Wanderers	2022–23	League One	3	0	1	0	2	0	3	0	9	0
Wycombe Wanderers	2023–24	League One	0	0	0	0	0	0	0	0	0	0
Wycombe Wanderers	Total		3	0	1	0	2	0	4	0	10	0
Maidenhead United (loan)	2021–22	National League	7	0	0	0	0	0	0	0	7	0
Ebbsfleet United (loan)	2023–24	National League	5	0	0	0	0	0	0	0	5	0
Ebbsfleet United	2024–25	National League	4	0	0	0	0	0	3 (Note: Appearances in the National League Cup)	0	7	0
Career total			34	0	1	0	2	0	11	0	48	0
