= 2021–22 Wycombe Wanderers F.C. season =

Wycombe Wanderers
2021–22 season
- Owner: Feliciana EFL Ltd (75%); Wycombe Wanderers Trust (25%)
- Chairman: Rob Couhig
- Manager: Gareth Ainsworth
- Stadium: Adams Park
- League One: 6th (lost in play-off final)
- FA Cup: First round (eliminated by Hartlepool United)
- EFL Cup: Third round (eliminated by Manchester City)
- EFL Trophy: Group stage
- BBFA Senior Cup: Semi-finals
- Top goalscorer: League: Sam Vokes (16); All: Sam Vokes (17)
- Highest home attendance: 9,005 vs. Sheffield Wednesday, 23 April 2022
- Lowest home attendance: 593 vs. Burton Albion, 9 November 2021
- Average home league attendance: 5,658
- Biggest win: 4–1 (vs. Cambridge United, 5 April 2022); 3–0 (twice) (vs. Plymouth Argyle, 23 November 2021) (vs. Cambridge United, 1 March 2022)
- Biggest defeat: 6–1 (vs. Manchester City, 21 September 2021); 0–5 (vs. Burton Albion, 9 November 2021)
Home colours	Away colours	Third colours
- All statistics correct as of 21 May 2022.

The 2021–22 Wycombe Wanderers Football Club season is the club's 135th season in existence. They will be playing in League One, the third tier of English football, having been relegated from the 2020–21 EFL Championship. In addition to the domestic league, Wycombe will be participating in this season's editions of the FA Cup, the EFL Cup, the EFL Trophy and the Berks and Bucks Senior Cup

== Players ==
=== Current squad ===
No.	Nationality	Name	Age	Joined club (Note: Year that player became a Wycombe Wanderers first-team player. If a player has played more than one spell at Wycombe Wanderers, the beginning of the most recent spell is used.)	Contract expires (Note: If the contract expiration is unknown "N/A" is stated.) (Note: The loan expiration date is stated in this column as either a specific date or "End of season".)	All time appearances for club	All time goals for club
GOALKEEPERS
13	(England)	David Stockdale	41	September 2020	June 2022	73	0
30	(England)	Tyla Dickinson	25	August 2021	June 2022	0	0
31	(Wales)	Adam Przybek	26	July 2021	June 2022	5	0
DEFENDERS
2	(Scotland)	Jack Grimmer	32	July 2019	June 2023	96	2
3	(Wales)	Joe Jacobson	39	July 2014	June 2022	351	42
5	(England)	Anthony Stewart	34	July 2015	June 2022	292	18
6	(England)	Ryan Tafazolli	35	September 2020	N/A	59	7
21	(England)	Jack Wakely	25	July 2021	June 2023	1	0
23	(England)	Jordan Obita	32	January 2021	June 2023	61	5
26	(England)	Jason McCarthy	30	August 2020	June 2023	162	9
34	(Saint Kitts and Nevis)	Andre Burley	27	September 2020	June 2022	4	0
35	(England)	Max Ram	25	August 2021	June 2022	3	0
38	(England)	Chris Forino	26	April 2021	June 2024	18	2
MIDFIELDERS
4	(England)	Dominic Gape	32	January 2017	June 2022	188	3
7	(England)	David Wheeler	36	July 2019	N/A	117	9
8	(England)	Curtis Thompson	33	July 2018	N/A	146	3
11	(England)	Lewis Wing	31	January 2022	June 2022	15	2
15	(England)	Jack Young†	25	January 2022	June 2025	2	0
17	(Republic of Ireland)	Daryl Horgan	34	September 2020	June 2022	84	2
19	(Albania)	Anis Mehmeti	25	September 2020	June 2024	67	10
22	(England)	Nick Freeman	30	July 2016	June 2023	130	7
24	(England)	Adam Leathers	24	September 2021	N/A	1	0
27	(France)	Jean-Baptiste Fischer	28	September 2021	June 2022	0	0
28	(England)	Josh Scowen	33	July 2021	July 2023	143	4
33	(England)	Oliver Pendlebury	24	July 2021	June 2022	9	2
FORWARDS
9	(Wales)	Sam Vokes	36	July 2021	June 2023	50	17
12	(Jamaica)	Garath McCleary	39	November 2020	N/A	80	15
16	(Sierra Leone)	Sullay Kaikai	31	July 2021	June 2023	22	2
18	(England)	Brandon Hanlan	29	August 2021	June 2024	43	8
20	(England)	Adebayo Akinfenwa	44	July 2016	June 2022	250	60
25	(Iraq)	Ali Al-Hamadi	24	November 2021	June 2023	0	0
29	(Gibraltar)	Tjay De Barr	26	August 2021	June 2022	8	1
36	(England)	Malachi Linton	25	September 2020	June 2022	2	0
39	(England)	Connor Parsons	25	August 2021	June 2022	3	1

† Loan player

== Transfers ==
=== Transfers in ===
Date	Position	Nationality	Name	From	Fee	Ref.
1 July 2021	DM	(England)	Oliver Pendlebury	(England) Reading U23s	Free transfer	
1 July 2021	CM	(England)	Josh Scowen	(England) Sunderland	Free transfer	
15 July 2021	LW	(Sierra Leone)	Sullay Kaikai	(England) Blackpool	Free transfer	
17 July 2021	GK	(Wales)	Adam Przybek	(England) Ipswich Town U23s	Free transfer	
28 July 2021	CF	(Wales)	Sam Vokes	(England) Stoke City	Undisclosed	
28 July 2021	CB	(England)	Jack Wakely	(England) Chelsea U23s	Free transfer	
4 August 2021	CF	(Gibraltar)	Tjay De Barr	(Gibraltar) Lincoln Red Imps	Free transfer	
4 August 2021	GK	(England)	Tyla Dickinson	(England) Queens Park Rangers U23s	Free transfer	
4 August 2021	CB	(England)	Max Ram	(England) Stratford Town	Free transfer	
24 August 2021	LW	(England)	Connor Parsons	(Iceland) Dalvík/Reynir	Free transfer	
26 August 2021	CF	(England)	Brandon Hanlan	(England) Bristol Rovers	Undisclosed	
17 September 2021	CM	(France)	Jean-Baptiste Fischer	(Wales) Swansea University	Free transfer	
17 September 2021	DM	(England)	Adam Leathers	Free agent	Free transfer	
20 November 2021	CF	(Iraq)	Ali Al-Hamadi	Free agent	Free transfer	
31 January 2022	CM	(England)	Lewis Wing	(England) Middlesbrough	Undisclosed	

=== Loans in ===
Date from	Position	Nationality	Name	From	Date until	Ref.
31 January 2022	CM	(England)	Jack Young	(England) Newcastle United U23s	End of season	

=== Transfers out ===
Date	Position	Nationality	Name	To	Fee	Ref.
1 July 2021	GK	(England)	Ryan Allsop	(England) Derby County	Released	
1 July 2021	CB	(England)	Darius Charles	(England) AFC Wimbledon	Released	
1 July 2021	CF	(Cyprus)	Andronicos Georgiou	Free agent	Released	
1 July 2021	RM	(Nigeria)	Fred Onyedinma	(England) Luton Town	Undisclosed	
1 July 2021	CM	(England)	Alex Pattison	(England) Harrogate Town	Free transfer	
1 July 2021	CB	(United States)	Giles Phillips	(England) Aldershot Town	Released	
1 July 2021	GK	(Scotland)	Cameron Yates	(Republic of Ireland) Dundalk	Released	
2 July 2021	CF	(Uganda)	Uche Ikpeazu	(England) Middlesbrough	Undisclosed	
30 August 2021	SS	(England)	Scott Kashket	(England) Crewe Alexandra	Mutual consent	
31 August 2021	CF	(Wales)	Alex Samuel	(Scotland) Ross County	Mutual consent	
5 January 2021	RB	(England)	James Clark	(England) Beaconsfield Town	Contract Expiration	
31 January 2022	GK	(England)	Curtis Anderson	(England) Lancaster City	Mutual consent	
2 February 2022	CM	(England)	Matt Bloomfield	Retired		

=== Loans out ===
Date from	Position	Nationality	Name	To	Date until	Ref.
1 August 2021	GK	(England)	Curtis Anderson	(England) Eastbourne Borough	End of season	(Note: On 9 September 2021, Curtis Anderson's loan spell was ended.)
20 August 2021	CF	(England)	Malachi Linton	(England) King's Lynn Town	End of season	
15 October 2021	GK	(England)	Tyla Dickinson	(England) Hayes & Yeading United	15 November 2021	(Note: On 13 November 2021, Tyla Dickinson's loan spell was extended until 9 December 2021.)
5 November 2021	CB	(Saint Kitts and Nevis)	Andre Burley	(England) Maidenhead United	End of season	(Note: On 17 January 2021, Andre Burley's loan spell was ended.)
19 November 2021	CB	(England)	Max Ram	(England) Hungerford Town	End of season	(Note: On 1 February 2022, Max Ram's loan spell was extended until the end of the season.)
26 November 2021	RB	(England)	James Clark	(England) Beaconsfield Town	3 January 2022	
26 November 2021	LW	(England)	Connor Parsons	(England) Notts County	29 January 2022	
28 January 2022	CB	(Saint Kitts and Nevis)	Andre Burley	(England) Hungerford Town	End of season	
28 January 2022	DM	(England)	Adam Leathers	(England) Dulwich Hamlet	28 February 2022	
4 February 2022	LW	(England)	Connor Parsons	(England) Bromley	4 March 2022	(Note: On 2 March 2022, Connor Parsons' loan spell was extended until the end of the season.) (Note: On 10 May 2022, Connor Parsons' loan spell was ended.)
11 February 2022	CF	(Gibraltar)	Tjay De Barr	(England) Eastleigh	15 March 2022	
26 February 2022	CM	(France)	Jean-Baptiste Fischer	(England) Braintree Town	End of season	
4 March 2022	DM	(England)	Oliver Pendlebury	(England) Woking	End of season	(Note: On 13 April 2022, Oliver Pendlebury's loan spell was ended.)
11 March 2022	CF	(Iraq)	Ali Al-Hamadi	(England) Bromley	End of season	
24 March 2022	CB	(England)	Jack Wakely	(England) Maidenhead United	End of season	

== Pre-season and friendlies ==
Wycombe Wanderers' first four pre-season friendly fixtures were announced on 28 May 2021, which consisted of a main squad fixture against Stevenage at a neutral venue on 17 July 2021 as well as three fixtures for the development team against Chesham United on 9 July 2021, Aylesbury United on 23 July 2021 and Hanwell Town on 30 July 2021. A fifth friendly was confirmed for July 28, as Leicester City to visit Adams Park.

Win Draw Loss Fixtures

9 July 2021 Friendly	Chesham United	1–1	Wycombe Wanderers	Chesham
19:30 BST		Report		Stadium: The Meadow

17 July 2021 Friendly	Wycombe Wanderers	1–0	Stevenage	Booker
15:30 BST	Kashket	Report		Stadium: Wycombe Wanderers Training Ground; Attendance: Behind closed doors

23 July 2021 Friendly	Aylesbury United	1–3	Wycombe Wanderers	Chesham
19:30 BST		Report		Stadium: The Meadow

28 July 2021 Friendly	Wycombe Wanderers	1–0	Leicester City	High Wycombe
19:45 BST	Horgan 80'	Report		Stadium: Adams Park; Attendance: 5,000

30 July 2021 Friendly	Hanwell Town	1–3	Wycombe Wanderers	Perivale
				Stadium: Powerday Stadium

9 September 2021 Friendly	Wycombe Wanderers	2–3	Maidenhead United	High Wycombe
13:30 BST	Mehmeti; Parsons	Report	Acquah; Smith; Kelly	Stadium: Adams Park; Attendance: Behind Closed Doors

26 October 2021 Friendly	Wycombe Wanderers	1–1	AFC Bournemouth U21s	High Wycombe
13:00 BST	Al-Hamadi	Report	Moriah-Welsh	Stadium: Adams Park; Attendance: Behind Closed Doors

14 December 2021 Friendly	Wycombe Wanderers	5–0	Kinetic Foundation Academy	Bisham
	Al-Hamadi; De Barr; Kaikai; Wakely	Report		Stadium: Bisham Abbey; Attendance: Behind Closed Doors

24 January 2022 Friendly	Wycombe Wanderers	0–2	Ipswich Town	High Wycombe
13:00 GMT		Report		Stadium: Adams Park; Attendance: Behind Closed Doors

7 March 2022 Friendly	Brentford	2–3	Wycombe Wanderers	Osterley
13:00 GMT	Wissa	Report	Al-Hamdi; Forino; Wheeler	Stadium: Jersey Road; Attendance: Behind Closed Doors

== Competitions ==
=== Overview ===
Competition	First match	Last match	Starting round	Final position	Record							
Competition	First match	Last match	Starting round	Final position	Pld	W	D	L	GF	GA	GD	Win %
EFL League One	7 August 2021	30 April 2022	Matchday 1	6th	46	23	14	9	75	51	+24	50.00
EFL League One play-offs	5 May 2022	21 May 2022	Semi Final	Final	3	1	0	2	2	3	−1	33.33
FA Cup	6 November 2021	16 November 2021	First round	First round	2	0	1	1	2	3	−1	0.00
EFL Cup	10 August 2021	21 September 2021	First round	Third round	3	0	2	1	3	8	−5	0.00
EFL Trophy	31 August 2021	9 November 2021	First round	First round	3	0	0	3	2	10	−8	0.00
Total					57	24	17	16	84	75	+9	42.11

Last updated: 21 May 2022
Source: Competitions

=== EFL League One ===
==== League table ====
Pos	Team	Pld	W	D	L	GF	GA	GD	Pts	Promotion, qualification or relegation
2	Rotherham United (P)	46	27	9	10	70	33	+37	90	Promotion to EFL Championship
3	Milton Keynes Dons	46	26	11	9	78	44	+34	89	Qualification for League One play-offs
4	Sheffield Wednesday	46	24	13	9	78	50	+28	85	Qualification for League One play-offs
5	Sunderland (O, P)	46	24	12	10	79	53	+26	84	Qualification for League One play-offs
6	Wycombe Wanderers	46	23	14	9	75	51	+24	83	Qualification for League One play-offs
7	Plymouth Argyle	46	23	11	12	68	48	+20	80	
8	Oxford United	46	22	10	14	82	59	+23	76	
9	Bolton Wanderers	46	21	10	15	74	57	+17	73	
10	Portsmouth	46	20	13	13	68	51	+17	73	

Source: EFL Official Website
Rules for classification: 1) Points; 2) Goal difference; 3) Number of goals scored; 4) Head-to-head results; 5) Wins; 6) Away goals; 7) Penalty points based on yellow and red cards received excluding the last four games of the season (sec 9.5); 8) 12-point sending off offences; 9) If the tie affects the automatic promotion or relegation places, a play-off game or games would be held between the two tied teams
(O) Play-off winners; (P) Promoted

==== Results summary ====
Overall								Home						Away					
Pld	W	D	L	GF	GA	GD	Pts	W	D	L	GF	GA	GD	W	D	L	GF	GA	GD
46	23	14	9	75	51	+24	83	14	5	4	39	26	+13	9	9	5	36	25	+11

Last updated: 30 April 2022.

==== Results by matchday ====
Matchday	1	2	3	4	5	6	7	8	9	10	11	12	13	14	15	16	17	18	19	20	21	22	23	24	25	26	27	28	29	30	31	32	33	34	35	36	37	38	39	40	41	42	43	44	45	46
Ground	H	A	A	H	A	A	H	A	A	H	H	A	A	H	A	H	H	H	A	A	H	H	A	A	H	A	H	A	H	H	A	H	H	A	H	A	H	H	A	H	A	A	H	A	H	A
Result	W	W	D	W	L	D	W	L	W	W	W	W	D	W	D	L	L	W	W	D	W	D	L	W	D	W	W	L	L	D	D	D	L	L	W	W	D	W	D	W	W	D	W	D	W	W
Position	4	1	3	2	6	9	5	6	6	5	2	2	3	2	3	4	4	4	2	3	3	4	6	4	3	3	1	4	5	6	5	6	7	8	7	5	8	8	8	8	6	7	6	6	6	6

Updated to match(es) played on 30 April 2022. Source:
A = Away; H = Home; W = Win; D = Draw; L = Loss

==== Matches ====
Wycombe's fixtures were announced on 24 June 2021. Due to Derby County's financial irregularities from previous seasons, an interchangeable fixture list was originally made between Derby County in the Championship and Wycombe Wanderers in League One in case of any retrospective points deductions to be awarded for the 2020–21 season. However, on 2 July 2021, it was confirmed that Wycombe Wanderers would remain in League One after the EFL decided not to appeal against the Independent Disciplinary Commission's ruling of a £100,000 fine against Derby County.

7 August 2021 1	Wycombe Wanderers	2–1	Accrington Stanley	High Wycombe
15:00 BST	McCleary 9', 15'	Report	Sykes (yellow card) 38'; Butcher 86'	Stadium: Adams Park; Attendance: 4,551; Referee: Charles Breakspear

14 August 2021 2	Cheltenham Town	1–3	Wycombe Wanderers	Cheltenham
15:00 BST	Williams 45'; Chapman (yellow card) 61'; Hussey (yellow card) 90+5'	Report	Vokes 14'; Pendlebury 74', 79'	Stadium: Jonny-Rocks Stadium; Attendance: 3,860; Referee: Carl Boyeson

17 August 2021 3	Wigan Athletic	1–1	Wycombe Wanderers	Wigan
19:45 BST	Lang 47'; Wyke (yellow card) 55'; Cousins (yellow card) 66'; Amos (yellow card) 81'	Report	Pendlebury (yellow card) 53'; Obita (yellow card) 87'; Stewart 90+1'	Stadium: DW Stadium; Attendance: 8,671; Referee: Anthony Backhouse

21 August 2021 4	Wycombe Wanderers	1–0	Lincoln City	High Wycombe
15:00 BST	Vokes 3', (yellow card) 39'; Thompson (yellow card) 37'; Grimmer (yellow card) 90+1'	Report	Bridcutt (yellow card) 59'	Stadium: Adams Park; Attendance: 5,030; Referee: James Bell

28 August 2021 5	Sunderland	3–1	Wycombe Wanderers	Sunderland
15:00 BST	Stewart 14', 83'; Embleton 18'; Flanagan (yellow card) 77'	Report	Scowen (yellow card) 31'; Wheeler 90+2'	Stadium: Stadium of Light; Attendance: 29,344; Referee: John Busby

4 September 2021	Wycombe Wanderers	Postponed	Ipswich Town	High Wycombe
15:00 BST				Stadium: Adams Park
Note: On 29 August, the match was postponed due to Wycombe Wanderers receiving three international call-ups.

11 September 2021 6	Oxford United	0–0	Wycombe Wanderers	Oxford
15:00 BST	Taylor (yellow card) 87'; Stevens (yellow card) 89'; Brannagan (yellow card) 90+7'; Gorrín (yellow card) 90+9'	Report	Thompson (yellow card) 90+7'	Stadium: Kassam Stadium; Attendance: 9,082; Referee: Martin Coy

18 September 2021 7	Wycombe Wanderers	2–1	Charlton Athletic	High Wycombe
15:00 BST	McCleary 43', 72'	Report	Gunter (yellow card) 56'; Souaré (yellow card) 61'; Lee (yellow card) 66'; Pearce (yellow card) 80'; Lavelle 90+2'; Famewo (yellow card) 90+4'	Stadium: Adams Park; Attendance: 5,832; Referee: Peter Wright

25 September 2021 8	Milton Keynes Dons	1–0	Wycombe Wanderers	Denbigh
15:00 BST	Parrott 40' (pen.); Harvie (yellow card) 84'	Report	Stewart (red card) 39'	Stadium: Stadium MK; Attendance: 9,355; Referee: Scott Oldham

28 September 2021 9	Shrewsbury Town	1–2	Wycombe Wanderers	Shrewsbury
19:45 BST	Whalley (yellow card) 36'; Ebanks-Landell (yellow card) 60'; Leahy (yellow card) 64'; Pennington 78'	Report	Kaikai (yellow card) 15'; Jacobson 52'; Tafazolli 66'; Grimmer (yellow card) 69'; Stewart (yellow card) 85'; Stockdale (yellow card) 90'	Stadium: Montgomery Waters Meadows; Attendance: 4,510; Referee: Ross Joyce

2 October 2021 10	Wycombe Wanderers	4–3	Morecambe	High Wycombe
15:00 BST	Horgan 50'; Vokes 53'; Tafazolli 73'; Thompson 90+2'	Report	McCalmont 4'; Phillips 26'; Ayunga 80'	Stadium: Adams Park; Attendance: 4,161; Referee: Tom Reeves

9 October 2021 11	Wycombe Wanderers	2–0	Gillingham	High Wycombe
15:00 BST	McCleary 2'; Hanlan 7'	Report	Oliver (penalty missed) 31', (yellow card) 37'	Stadium: Adams Park; Attendance: 4,992; Referee: Kevin Friend

16 October 2021 12	Doncaster Rovers	0–2	Wycombe Wanderers	Doncaster
15:00 BST	Knoyle (yellow card) 20'; Close (yellow card) 47'	Report	Stewart 2'; Akinfenwa 17'; Hanlan (yellow card) 42'	Stadium: Keepmoat Stadium; Attendance: 6,134; Referee: Seb Stockbridge

19 October 2021 13	Rotherham United	0–0	Wycombe Wanderers	Rotherham
19:45 BST	Rathbone (yellow card) 39'; Ferguson (yellow card) 48'	Report	Tafazolli (yellow card) 45+4'	Stadium: New York Stadium; Attendance: 8,104; Referee: Robert Madley

23 October 2021 14	Wycombe Wanderers	2–1	Crewe Alexandra	High Wycombe
15:00 BST	Tafazolli 45+1', 90+7'	Report	Offord (yellow card) 71'; Lowery 77'	Stadium: Adams Park; Attendance: 4,813; Referee: Steve Martin

30 October 2021 15	Fleetwood Town	3–3	Wycombe Wanderers	Fleetwood
15:00 BST	Andrew 5', (yellow card) 88'; Garner 60'; Morris 64'	Report	Hanlan 24'; Akinfenwa 30'; Tafazolli (yellow card) 32'; Vokes 50'; Jacobson (yellow card) 76'; Scowen (yellow card) 80'	Stadium: Highbury Stadium; Attendance: 2,657; Referee: Andrew Kitchen

2 November 2021 16	Wycombe Wanderers	1–4	Ipswich Town	High Wycombe
19:45 GMT	Wheeler 17'; Hanlan (yellow card) 55'; Scowen (yellow card) 85'	Report	Celina 27', 90+4', (yellow card) 90+5'; Bonne 51'; Burns 60'; Nsiala (yellow card) 73'	Stadium: Adams Park; Attendance: 6,943; Referee: Lee Swabey

13 November 2021 17	Wycombe Wanderers	0–1	Portsmouth	High Wycombe
15:00 GMT	Obita (yellow card) 4'; Jacobson (penalty missed) 28', (yellow card) 45'; McCarthy (yellow card) 67'	Report	Harness 73'; Bass (yellow card) 81'	Stadium: Adams Park; Attendance: 6,471; Referee: Tom Nield

20 November 2021 18	Wycombe Wanderers	1–0	Bolton Wanderers	High Wycombe
15:00 GMT	Tafazolli (yellow card) 13'; Mehmeti (penalty missed) 27'; Vokes 72'; Stockdale (yellow card) 90+4'	Report		Stadium: Adams Park; Attendance: 5,710; Referee: James Oldham

23 November 2021 19	Plymouth Argyle	0–3	Wycombe Wanderers	Plymouth
19:45 GMT	Mayor (yellow card) 25'; Houghton (yellow card) 90+7'	Report	Wheeler (yellow card) 16'; Jacobson (yellow card) 52'; Vokes 62'; Pendlebury (yellow card) 81'; Mehmeti 84', 90'; Stewart (yellow card) 90+4'	Stadium: Home Park; Attendance: 12,883; Referee: Alan Young

27 November 2021 20	Sheffield Wednesday	2–2	Wycombe Wanderers	Owlerton
15:00 GMT	Luongo (yellow card) 24'; Shodipo 45+9', (yellow card) 68'; Windass 50'	Report	Mehmeti 23'; Obita 65'; Stewart (yellow card) 88'; Akinfenwa (yellow card) 90+3'	Stadium: Hillsborough Stadium; Attendance: 20,761; Referee: Darren Drysdale

7 December 2021 21	Wycombe Wanderers	2–1	Burton Albion	High Wycombe
19:45 GMT	Hanlan 16'; McCleary 45+1'; Forino (yellow card) 63'	Report	Mancienne (yellow card) 14'; Jebbison (yellow card) 42'; Shaughnessy 54'; Maddox (yellow card) 72'	Stadium: Adams Park; Attendance: 3,602; Referee: Josh Smith

11 December 2021 22	Wycombe Wanderers	2–2	AFC Wimbledon	High Wycombe
15:00 GMT	Thompson (yellow card) 62'; Akinfenwa 74'; Jacobson 90+6' (pen.)	Report	Rudoni 4', 90+2', (yellow card) 90+3'; McCormick (yellow card) 33'; Assal (yellow card) 51'; Osew (yellow card) 90+5'	Stadium: Adams Park; Attendance: 4,915; Referee: Will Finnie

18 December 2021	Bolton Wanderers	Postponed	Wycombe Wanderers	Horwich
15:00 GMT				Stadium: University of Bolton Stadium
Note: On 16 December, the match was postponed due to a number of positive COVID-19 tests among Bolton Wanderers' players.

26 December 2021	Wycombe Wanderers	Postponed	Cambridge United	High Wycombe
15:00 GMT				Stadium: Adams Park
Note: On 22 December, the match was postponed due to a number of positive COVID-19 tests among Cambridge United' players.

29 December 2021 23	Ipswich Town	1–0	Wycombe Wanderers	Ipswich
19:45 GMT	Morsy (yellow card) 8'; Penney (yellow card) 10'; Norwood 44'; Pigott (yellow card) 90+1'	Report	Scowen (yellow card) 90+1'	Stadium: Portman Road; Attendance: 26,456; Referee: Sam Barrott

1 January 2022 24	Charlton Athletic	0–1	Wycombe Wanderers	Charlton
15:00 GMT	Clare (yellow card) 21'; Pearce (yellow card) 90+4'	Report	Mehmeti (yellow card) 33'; Vokes 35'; Wheeler (yellow card) 69'; McCleary (yellow card) 90+4'; Obita (yellow card) 90+5'	Stadium: The Valley; Attendance: 18,895; Referee: Paul Howard

8 January 2022 25	Wycombe Wanderers	3–3	Sunderland	High Wycombe
12:30 GMT	Mehmeti 13'; Scowen (yellow card) 22'; Vokes 36'; Jacobson (yellow card) 45+2', (goal) 90+8'	Report	Stockdale 3' (o.g.); Stewart 39', 90+3'; Embleton (yellow card) 83'	Stadium: Adams Park; Attendance: 7,229; Referee: Charles Breakspear

11 January 2021 26	Bolton Wanderers	0–2	Wycombe Wanderers	Horwich
20:00 GMT		Report	Hanlan 35'; McCleary (yellow card) 47+5'; Tafazolli (yellow card) 47+12'; Grimmer 52'; Scowen (yellow card) 57'; Jacobson (yellow card) 67'	Stadium: University of Bolton Stadium; Attendance: 12,584; Referee: Peter Wright

15 January 2022 27	Wycombe Wanderers	2–0	Oxford United	High Wycombe
15:00 GMT	Thompson 33'; Hanlan (yellow card) 52', (goal) 60'; McCleary (yellow card) 64'	Report	Sykes (yellow card) 77'; Brannagan (yellow card) 90+1'	Stadium: Adams Park; Attendance: 8,005; Referee: Anthony Backhouse

22 January 2022 28	Morecambe	3–2	Wycombe Wanderers	Morecambe
15:00 GMT	O'Connor 39'; Leigh (yellow card) 53'; Ayunga 60', (yellow card) 86'; Stockton 67'	Report	Akinfenwa 2'; Grimmer 54'; Tafazolli (yellow card) 58'; Jacobson (yellow card) 84'	Stadium: Mazuma Stadium; Attendance: 3,865; Referee: Ben Toner

29 January 2022 29	Wycombe Wanderers	0–1	Milton Keynes Dons	High Wycombe
15:00 GMT	Jacobson (yellow card) 42'; Stewart (yellow card) 72'	Report	Twine 13', (yellow card) 42'; Harvie (yellow card) 45+6'; Darling (yellow card) 64'; Parrott (yellow card) 67'; Boateng (yellow card) 83'; Coventry (yellow card) 90+6'	Stadium: Adams Park; Attendance: 7,345; Referee: Robert Lewis

5 February 2022	Cambridge United	Postponed	Wycombe Wanderers	Cambridge
15:00 GMT				Stadium: Abbey Stadium
Note: On 8 January, the match was postponed due to Cambridge United's involvement in the fourth round of the FA Cup.

8 February 2022 30	Wycombe Wanderers	0–0	Shrewsbury Town	High Wycombe
19:45 GMT	Jacobson (yellow card) 87'	Report	Bennett (yellow card) 34'; Maroši (yellow card) 53'; Pennington (yellow card) 69'	Stadium: Adams Park; Attendance: 3,871; Referee: Sam Purkiss

12 February 2022 31	Lincoln City	1–1	Wycombe Wanderers	Lincoln
15:00 GMT	Cullen 5'; Bramall (yellow card) 63'; Griffiths (yellow card) 68'; Maguire (yellow card) 74'; Marquis (yellow card) 83'; McGrandles (yellow card) 90+4'	Report	Scowen (yellow card) 20' (yellow-red card) 90+3'; Forino 85'	Stadium: LNER Stadium; Attendance: 8,319; Referee: Ollie Yates

19 February 2022 32	Wycombe Wanderers	5–5	Cheltenham Town	High Wycombe
15:00 GMT	Obita 26', 31'; Hanlan 33'; Vokes 68', 69'; Jacobson (yellow card) 73'; Grimmer (yellow card) 89'; Wheeler (yellow card) 90+6'	Report	May 3', 52', 71', 81'; Etete (yellow card) 22', (goal) 66'	Stadium: Adams Park; Attendance: 5,574; Referee: Neil Hair

22 February 2022 33	Wycombe Wanderers	1–3	Wigan Athletic	High Wycombe
19:45 GMT	Kaikai 22'	Report	Tilt (yellow card) 57'; Naylor 70'; Lang 78', 82'	Stadium: Adams Park; Attendance: 4,826; Referee: Thomas Bramall

26 February 2022 34	Accrington Stanley	3–2	Wycombe Wanderers	Accrington
15:00 GMT	Adeloyin 20'; Sykes 48', (yellow card) 80'; Pell 64'; Hamilton (yellow card) 90+5'; Clark (red card) 90+7'	Report	Vokes 13'; Kaikai 22'; Obita (yellow card) 36'; Gape (yellow card) 90'; McCarthy (yellow card) 90+5'	Stadium: Crown Ground; Attendance: 2,242; Referee: Bobby Madley

1 March 2022 35	Wycombe Wanderers	3–0	Cambridge United	High Wycombe
19:45 GMT	Mehmeti 11', 85'; McCleary 15'; Obita (yellow card) 69'; McCarthy (yellow card) 84'	Report	May (yellow card) 36'	Stadium: Adams Park; Attendance: 4,083; Referee: James Oldham

5 March 2022 36	Crewe Alexandra	1–3	Wycombe Wanderers	Crewe
15:00 GMT	Porter 58'; Offord (yellow card) 67'; Griffiths (yellow card) 79'	Report	Vokes 14'; Wing 55', 90+10', (yellow card) 90+7'	Stadium: Mornflake Stadium; Attendance: 4,031; Referee: Andy Haines

12 March 2022 37	Wycombe Wanderers	0–0	Rotherham United	High Wycombe
15:00 GMT	Stewart (yellow card) 90'	Report	Rathbone (yellow card) 76'; Ihiekwe (yellow card) 81'	Stadium: Adams Park; Attendance: 5,742; Referee: Craig Hicks

15 March 2022 38	Wycombe Wanderers	1–0	Fleetwood Town	High Wycombe
19:45 GMT	Wing (yellow card) 5'; Scowen (yellow card) 74'; McCarthy 90+4'	Report	Lane (yellow card) 52'; Boyle (yellow card) 90+3'	Stadium: Adams Park; Attendance: 3,391; Referee: Josh Smith

19 March 2022 39	Portsmouth	0–0	Wycombe Wanderers	Milton
15:00 GMT	Raggett (yellow card) 77'; Carter (yellow card) 90+2'; Robertson (yellow card) 90+3'	Report	Stewart (yellow card) 37'	Stadium: Fratton Park; Attendance: 15,092; Referee: Benjamin Speedie

2 April 2022 40	Wycombe Wanderers	2–0	Doncaster Rovers	High Wycombe
15:00 BST	McCleary 18'; Mehmeti 75'; Obita (yellow card) 90+2'	Report	Knoyle (yellow card) 57'	Stadium: Adams Park; Attendance: 5,943; Referee: John Busby

5 April 2022 41	Cambridge United	1–4	Wycombe Wanderers	Cambridge
19:45 BST	Knibbs 79'; Digby (yellow card) 86'	Report	Vokes 7', 54'; Scowen 56'; McCleary 89'	Stadium: Abbey Stadium; Attendance: 4,751; Referee: Will Finnie

9 April 2022 42	Gillingham	1–1	Wycombe Wanderers	Gillingham
15:00 BST	Kelman (yellow card) 64'; Tucker 75'; Oliver (yellow card) 78'	Report	Vokes 20'; Scowen (yellow card) 27'; Wing (red card) 86'	Stadium: MEMS Priestfield Stadium; Attendance: 4,858; Referee: Simon Mather

15 April 2022 43	Wycombe Wanderers	2–0	Plymouth Argyle	High Wycombe
15:00 BST	McCleary 14', 31'; Scowen (yellow card) 45+4'; Stockdale (yellow card) 90+1'	Report		Stadium: Adams Park; Attendance: 8,181; Referee: Darren Drysdale

18 April 2022 44	AFC Wimbledon	1–1	Wycombe Wanderers	Wimbledon
15:00 BST	Rudoni 21'; Marsh (yellow card) 58'; Brown (yellow card) 70'	Report	Tafazolli (yellow card) 73'; Akinfenwa 80'; Scowen (yellow card) 86'	Stadium: Plough Lane; Attendance: 8,502; Referee: Sam Barrott

23 April 2022 45	Wycombe Wanderers	1–0	Sheffield Wednesday	High Wycombe
15:00 BST	Jacobson (yellow card) 59'; Obita 62'; McCleary (yellow card) 90+3'	Report	Dunkley (yellow card) 18'; Hutchinson (yellow card) 81'	Stadium: Adams Park; Attendance: 9,005; Referee: Andy Davies

30 April 2022 46	Burton Albion	1–2	Wycombe Wanderers	Burton upon Trent
12:30 BST	Mancienne (yellow card) 16'; Hamer (yellow card) 58'; Ahadme 72'	Report	Vokes 43'; Tafazolli (yellow card) 76'; Jacobson (yellow card) 82'; Obita 85'	Stadium: Pirelli Stadium; Attendance: 4,440; Referee: Bobby Madley

=== League One play-offs ===
5 May 2022 Play Off Semi Final 1st Leg	Wycombe Wanderers	2–0	Milton Keynes Dons	High Wycombe
19:45 BST	Gape (yellow card) 31'; Tafazolli 38'; Jacobson (yellow card) 60'; Horgan (yellow card) 64'; Vokes 82'	Report	McEachran (yellow card) 64' (yellow-red card) 69'	Stadium: Adams Park; Attendance: 8,987; Referee: Darren Bond

8 May 2022 Play Off Semi Final 2nd Leg	Milton Keynes Dons	1–0 (1–2 agg.)	Wycombe Wanderers	Milton Keynes
18:30 BST	Parrott 26'	Report	Scowen (yellow card) 30'; McCarthy (yellow card) 83'; Jacobson (yellow card) 89'	Stadium: Stadium MK; Attendance: 13,012; Referee: Thomas Bramall

21 May 2022 Play Off Final	Sunderland	2–0	Wycombe Wanderers	Wembley
15:00 BST	Embleton 12'; Cirkin (yellow card) 46'; Pritchard (yellow card) 75'; Stewart 79'	Report		Stadium: Wembley Stadium; Attendance: 72,332; Referee: Simon Hooper

=== FA Cup ===
Wycombe Wanderers were drawn away to Hartlepool United in the first round.

6 November 2021 First round	Hartlepool United	2–2	Wycombe Wanderers	Hartlepool
15:00 GMT	Cullen 45+1'; Molyneux 65'; Daly (yellow card) 71'; Mitchell (yellow card) 72'; Liddle (yellow card) 78'	Report	Forino 63'; Jacobson (yellow card) 69', (goal) 74' (pen.); Obita (yellow card) 83'; Horgan (yellow card) 85'	Stadium: Victoria Park; Attendance: 4,271; Referee: Darren Drysdale

16 November 2021 First round replay	Wycombe Wanderers	0–1	Hartlepool United	High Wycombe
19:45 GMT	Jacobson (yellow card) 67'; Stewart (yellow card) 84'; Wheeler (yellow card) 90+3'	Report	Cullen 20'; Liddle (yellow card) 55'; Featherstone (yellow card) 90+2'	Stadium: Adams Park; Attendance: 1,582; Referee: Christopher Pollard

=== EFL Cup ===
Wanderers were drawn away to Exeter City in the first round, Stevenage in the second round and Manchester City in the third round.

10 August 2021 First round	Exeter City	0–0 (3–4 p)	Wycombe Wanderers	Exeter
19:45 BST	Sparkes (yellow card) 79'	Report	Mehmeti (yellow card) 54'	Stadium: St James Park; Attendance: 2,555; Referee: David Rock
	Penalties
	Sparkes (penalty missed); Sweeney (penalty scored); Seymour (penalty scored); Brown (penalty scored); Grounds (penalty missed); Dodd (penalty missed)		Vokes (penalty missed); Horgan (penalty scored); Samuel (penalty missed); Mehmeti (penalty scored); Stockdale (penalty scored); Pendlebury (penalty scored)

24 August 2021 Second round	Stevenage	2–2 (3–5 p)	Wycombe Wanderers	Stevenage
19:45 BST	Reeves (yellow card) 46'; List 50'; Reid 77'	Report	Akinfenwa 23'; Jacobson (yellow card) 27'; Pendlebury (yellow card) 34'; Burley (yellow card) 60'; De Barr 90+4'	Stadium: Broadhall Way; Attendance: 1,934; Referee: Declan Bourne
	Penalties
	Norris (penalty scored); James-Wildin (penalty missed); Reeves (penalty scored); Coker (penalty scored)		Jacobson (penalty scored); Horgan (penalty scored); Pendlebury (penalty scored); Mehmeti (penalty scored); De Barr (penalty scored)

21 September 2021 Third round	Manchester City	6–1	Wycombe Wanderers	Manchester
19:45 BST	De Bruyne 29'; Lavia (yellow card) 40'; Mahrez 43', 83'; Foden 45+1'; Torres 71'; Palmer 88'	Report	Hanlan 22'	Stadium: City of Manchester Stadium; Attendance: 30,959; Referee: Robert Jones

=== EFL Trophy ===
Wycombe were drawn into Southern Group C alongside Aston Villa U21s, Burton Albion and Milton Keynes Dons. On July 7, the dates were confirmed for the group stage ties.

Pos	Div	Team	Pld	W	PW	PL	L	GF	GA	GD	Pts	Qualification
1	ACA	Aston Villa U21	3	3	0	0	0	11	5	+6	9	Advance to Round 2
2	L1	Milton Keynes Dons	3	2	0	0	1	6	6	0	6	Advance to Round 2
3	L1	Burton Albion	3	1	0	0	2	8	6	+2	3	
4	L1	Wycombe Wanderers	3	0	0	0	3	2	10	−8	0	

Source: EFL.com

31 August 2021 Group game 1	Wycombe Wanderers	1–3	Aston Villa U21s	High Wycombe
19:00 BST	Parsons 11'; Linton (yellow card) 89'; Thompson (yellow card) 90+4'	Report	Archer 42'; Philogene 68', 90+9', (yellow card) 90+2'	Stadium: Adams Park; Attendance: 1,409; Referee: Paul Howard

5 October 2021 Group game 2	Milton Keynes Dons	2–1	Wycombe Wanderers	Denbigh
19:00 BST	Boateng 4', (yellow card) 88'; Jules 64'	Report	Hanlan 8'; Wheeler (yellow card) 63'; Thompson (yellow card) 90+2'	Stadium: Stadium MK; Attendance: 1,320; Referee: Christopher Pollard

9 November 2021 Group game 3	Wycombe Wanderers	0–5	Burton Albion	High Wycombe
19:00 GMT	Parsons (yellow card) 85'	Report	Amadi-Holloway (yellow card) 45+3', (goal) 50', 71', 90+3'; Lakin 75'; Smith 76'	Stadium: Adams Park; Attendance: 593; Referee: Benjamin Speedie

=== Berks & Bucks FA Senior Cup ===
As one of three EFL clubs competing in the Berks & Bucks FA Senior Cup, alongside Milton Keynes Dons and Reading, Wycombe will enter the competition in the quarter-finals as they did back in the 2019–20 competition, which was cancelled due to the COVID-19 pandemic. Wycombe Wanderers were drawn against Spartan South Midlands League Division One side Long Crendon. Wycombe beat Long Crendon 4–0 in what was the ASM Stadium record attendance in the stadium's existence (Beating Thame United vs Oxford United in 2011, 1,382). Wycombe drew against the Combined Counties League Premier Division North side Ascot United to set up a potential final against either Berkshire side Reading or fellow Buckinghamshire side MK Dons. Wycombe Lost 3–1 to Ascot United on penalties in what is another record breaking attendance for Ascot United with 1,267 people entering in the ground

15 February 2022 Quarter-finals	Long Crendon (Buckinghamshire)	0–4	(Buckinghamshire) Wycombe Wanderers	Thame
19:45 GMT		Report	Al-Hamadi; Young; Pendlebury; Fischer	Stadium: The ASM Stadium; Attendance: 1,904; Referee: Dan Todd

22 March 2022 Semi-finals	Ascot United (Berkshire)	0–0 (3–1 p)	(Buckinghamshire) Wycombe Wanderers	Ascot
19:45 GMT		Report		Stadium: Ascot Racecourse; Attendance: 1,267; Referee: Charlie Bullock

== Statistics ==
=== Appearances and goals ===
As of 21 May 2022

No.	Pos	Nat	Player	Total		League One		League One play-offs		FA Cup		EFL Cup		EFL Trophy	
No.	Pos	Nat	Player	Apps	Goals	Apps	Goals	Apps	Goals	Apps	Goals	Apps	Goals	Apps	Goals
2	DF	(Scotland) SCO	Jack Grimmer	30	2	26	2	1	0	1	0	1	0	1	0
3	DF	(Wales) WAL	Joe Jacobson	49	4	40	3	3	0	2	1	3	0	1	0
4	MF	(England) ENG	Dominic Gape	16	0	10	0	3	0	1	0	1	0	1	0
5	DF	(England) ENG	Anthony Stewart	42	2	36	2	3	0	1	0	2	0	0	0
6	DF	(England) ENG	Ryan Tafazolli	38	5	33	4	3	1	0	0	2	0	0	0
7	MF	(England) ENG	David Wheeler	37	2	30	2	2	0	2	0	1	0	2	0
8	MF	(England) ENG	Curtis Thompson	33	2	28	2	0	0	2	0	1	0	2	0
9	FW	(Wales) WAL	Sam Vokes	50	17	43	16	3	1	2	0	2	0	0	0
10	MF	(England) ENG	Matt Bloomfield (Note: On 2 February 2022, Matt Bloomfield retired from professional football.)	1	0	0	0	0	0	0	0	1	0	0	0
11	MF	(England) ENG	Lewis Wing	15	2	13	2	2	0	0	0	0	0	0	0
12	FW	(Jamaica) JAM	Garath McCleary	46	11	42	11	3	0	0	0	0	0	1	0
13	GK	(England) ENG	David Stockdale	52	0	46	0	3	0	1	0	2	0	0	0
15	MF	(England) ENG	Jack Young	2	0	2	0	0	0	0	0	0	0	0	0
16	FW	(Sierra Leone) SLE	Sullay Kaikai	22	2	17	2	0	0	1	0	3	0	1	0
17	MF	(Republic of Ireland) IRL	Daryl Horgan	42	1	34	1	3	0	2	0	3	0	0	0
18	FW	(England) ENG	Brandon Hanlan	43	8	36	6	1	0	2	0	1	1	3	1
19	MF	(Albania) ALB	Anis Mehmeti	38	7	32	7	0	0	2	0	2	0	2	0
20	FW	(England) ENG	Adebayo Akinfenwa	39	6	34	5	2	0	1	0	2	1	0	0
21	DF	(England) ENG	Jack Wakely	1	0	0	0	0	0	0	0	0	0	1	0
22	MF	(England) ENG	Nick Freeman	3	0	3	0	0	0	0	0	0	0	0	0
23	DF	(England) ENG	Jordan Obita	52	5	41	5	3	0	2	0	3	0	3	0
24	MF	(England) ENG	Adam Leathers	1	0	0	0	0	0	0	0	0	0	1	0
25	FW	(Iraq) IRQ	Ali Al-Hamadi	0	0	0	0	0	0	0	0	0	0	0	0
26	DF	(England) ENG	Jason McCarthy	39	1	31	1	3	0	2	0	2	0	1	0
27	MF	(France) FRA	Jean-Baptiste Fischer	0	0	0	0	0	0	0	0	0	0	0	0
28	MF	(England) ENG	Josh Scowen	43	1	37	1	3	0	2	0	1	0	0	0
29	FW	(Gibraltar) GIB	Tjay De Barr	8	1	5	0	0	0	1	0	1	1	1	0
30	GK	(England) ENG	Tyla Dickinson	0	0	0	0	0	0	0	0	0	0	0	0
31	GK	(Wales) WAL	Adam Przybek	5	0	0	0	0	0	1	0	1	0	3	0
33	MF	(England) ENG	Oliver Pendlebury	9	2	4	2	0	0	0	0	2	0	3	0
34	DF	(Saint Kitts and Nevis) SKN	Andre Burley	4	0	0	0	0	0	0	0	2	0	2	0
35	DF	(England) ENG	Max Ram	3	0	0	0	0	0	0	0	1	0	2	0
36	FW	(England) ENG	Malachi Linton	2	0	0	0	0	0	0	0	0	0	2	0
38	DF	(England) ENG	Chris Forino	18	2	15	1	0	0	1	1	0	0	2	0
39	FW	(England) ENG	Connor Parsons	3	1	0	0	0	0	0	0	0	0	3	1
Players who left the club before the end of the season:
11	FW	(England) ENG	Scott Kashket	0	0	0	0	0	0	0	0	0	0	0	0
25	FW	(Wales) WAL	Alex Samuel	2	0	0	0	0	0	2	0	0	0	0	0
32	GK	(England) ENG	Curtis Anderson	0	0	0	0	0	0	0	0	0	0	0	0
37	DF	(England) ENG	James Clark	2	0	0	0	0	0	0	0	0	0	2	0
