= 2020–21 Reading F.C. season =

Reading
2020–21 season
- Owner: Dai Yongge and Dai Xiuli (majority)
- Manager: Veljko Paunović (from 29 August)
- Stadium: Madejski Stadium
- EFL Championship: 7th
- FA Cup: Third round (eliminated by Luton Town)
- EFL Cup: Second round (eliminated by Luton Town)
- Top goalscorer: League: Lucas João (19); All: Lucas João (22)
- Highest home attendance: 2,000 vs Nottingham Forest, 5 December 2020 vs Birmingham City, 9 December 2020 vs Norwich City, 16 December 2020
- Lowest home attendance: 0 (22 games behind closed doors)
- Average home league attendance: 240
Home colours	Away colours

The 2020–21 season was Reading's 150th year in existence and eighth consecutive season in the Championship, and covers the period from 23 July 2020 to 30 June 2021.

== Season review ==
=== Pre-season ===
On 24 July, the EFL confirmed that the Championship would begin on the weekend of Saturday 12 September 2020.

==== Transfers and contracts ====
On 28 July, Reading announced the signing of Josh Laurent to a two-year contract, after his Shrewsbury Town contract expired at the end of the 2019–20 season.

On 3 August, Reading confirmed that Gabriel Osho had declined a new contract with the club after his old contract had expired on 31 July, and had left the club.

On 28 August, Reading confirmed the signing of Ovie Ejaria to a four-year contract from Liverpool.

=== August ===
Reading announced their first pre-season friendly on 13 August, an away trip on 28 August to Tottenham Hotspur Stadium to face Tottenham Hotspur.

On 18 August, Reading were drawn at home against Colchester United in the first round of the EFL Cup. The following day Reading announced they'd play Gillingham at home on 22 August in their first pre-season friendly game.

On 21 August, the EFL Championship fixture list was released, with Reading starting their campaign with an away trip to Derby County on 12 September. The following day, Reading faced Gillingham in a friendly at the Madejski Stadium. Two quick-fire goals from Lucas João and Andy Rinomhota gave Reading a 2–0 half time lead. In the second half, John Akinde pulled one back for Gillingham from the penalty with the games ended 2–1 to Reading.

On 28 August, Reading faced Tottenham Hotspur at the Tottenham Hotspur Stadium. Tottenham opened the scoring through an Omar Richards own goal, before goals from Dele Alli and Son Heung-min saw Tottenham take a 3–0 first half lead. In the second half Erik Lamela scored a free-kick before a late George Pușcaș penalty gave Reading a consolation goal to finish the game 4–1 to Tottenham. After the game the club announced that their planned friendly with West Ham United on 1 September was cancelled.

On 29 August, Reading announced the appointment of Veljko Paunović as manager.

On 31 August, Reading announced that as part of their Portuguese training camp, they would face Portimonense in a friendly at the Estádio Municipal de Portimão on 1 September. On the same day, the club confirmed that Mark Bowen had left the club after turning down a new role after being replaced as manager.

=== September ===
Reading started the season with a 3–1 home victory over Colchester United in the First Round EFL Cup under the leadership of Eddie Niedzwiecki whilst Veljko Paunović completed his quarantine period. After initially going 1–0 down to a Jevani Brown, Lucas João scored a hat trick to ensure victory and Reading progressed to the Second round of the cup. The following day Reading were drawn at home against Luton Town in the Second round of the EFL Cup, with a home time against Manchester United in the third round if they defeat Luton.

On 8 September, Reading announced the appointment of Quinton Fortune and Nuno Gomes as First Team coaches.

On 10 September, Jordan Holsgrove left the club to sign permanently for Celta Vigo.

Reading's first league game of the season took place on 12 September, against Derby County at Pride Park. Lucas João opened the scoring in the 40th minute, for his fourth goal in two matches, before providing the assist for Ovie Ejaria to double Reading's lead in the 1st minute of added on time at the end of the First Half, and giving Reading a 2–0 victory, to end the first round of games Second in the league.

On 15 September, Reading faced Luton Town at home in the second round of the EFL Cup. A 24th-minute goal from Jordan Clark saw Luton run out winners against a youthful Reading team that saw first team debuts for Dejan Tetek, Nelson Abbey and Lynford Sackey.

Reading's second league game of the season took place on 19 September, with Reading hosting Barnsley. Barnsley defender Michał Helik saw a straight red card in the 42nd minute after pulling back Lucas João, before substitute Yakou Méïté opened the scoring in the 67th minute. One minute later, Mads Juel Andersen was shown a second yellow card, after handling ball, seeing Barnsley down to nine men. Ten minutes later, in the 77th minute, Michael Olise struck a first time volley from the edge of the area to score his first Reading goal and to make it two wins out of two for Reading in the league.

On 22 September, Lewis Gibson joined Reading on a season-long loan deal from Everton.

On 23 September, Marc McNulty was arrested as part of a match fixing prob by Police Scotland.

Reading won their third league game in a row on 26 September, defeating Cardiff City 2–1 at the Cardiff City Stadium. Michael Morrison gave Reading the lead just after halftime with a header from a Michael Olise free kick, with Lucas João doubling the lead just after the hour mark. Lee Tomlin pulled one back for Cardiff City with ten minutes to go, but Reading held out to maintain their one-hundred percent start to the Championship season.

On 30 September, Jeriel Dorsett signed a new contract with Reading until the summer of 2022.

=== October ===
On 3 October, Reading hosted Watford at the Madejski Stadium and maintained their perfect start to the Championship season, with a 1–0 victory thanks to a goal from George Pușcaș.

On 4 October, Alfa Semedo joined Reading on a season-long loan deal from Benfica. The following day, 5 October, Reading signed Tomás Esteves on loan from Porto for the remainder of the season, whilst Marc McNulty joined Dundee United on loan for the season.

On 9 October, manager Veljko Paunović was announced as the Championship's manager of the month for September.

On 16 October, domestic transfer deadline-day, Sam Smith moved to Tranmere Rovers on loan until 7 January 2021. Reading travelled to Middlesbrough on 17 October, playing out a 0–0 draw to drop their first points of the season. Three days later, they hosted Wycombe Wanderers at the Madejski Stadium, after a goalless first half, Lucas João scored in the 64th minute with their only shot on target to take all three points. Matchday 7 saw Reading host Rotherham United at the Madejski Stadium on 24 October. Yakou Méïté opened the scoring shortly before halftime, before he doubled the lead in the 79th minute with a bicycle kick from a corner, before an injury time Lucas João penalty finished the game off.

On 27 October, Jökull Andrésson joined Exeter City on an emergency seven-day loan deal.

Reading lost their first league game of the season on 30 October, falling to a 3–2 defeat away to Coventry City at St Andrew's. Coventry took the lead through Gustavo Hamer in the first half, before Lucas João scored his ninth goal of the season to tie the game in the 66th minute. Matt Godden and Sam McCallum both scored late in the game to give Coventry City a 3–1 lead heading in to injury time, where George Pușcaș scored to finish the game 3–2.

Towards the end of October, Reading signed teenage Guinea-Bissau winger Mamadi Camará to a two-year contract from Feirense.

=== November ===
On 2 November, Andrésson's loan at Exeter City was extended for a further week.

Reading lost their second league game in a row on 4 November, with Preston North End running out 3–0 winners at Madejski Stadium. 3 days later, Reading suffered their third defeat in a row, and second 3–0 defeat in a row as Stoke City came away from the Madejski Stadium with the win.

Andrésson extended his loan at Exeter City for a third week on 10 November, a fourth on 17 November, and for a fifth time on 24 November.

=== December ===
On 15 December, Nelson Abbey signed his first professional contract with Reading, until the summer of 2022, and Reading confirmed that Omri Luzon had joined the U23 squad on a contract until June 2021.

On 23 December, Sam Walker joined Blackpool on a seven-day emergency loan. After making his debut for Blackpool on 29 December, Walkers loan deal was extended for a further seven days.

=== January ===
On 12 January, Reading's EFL Championship game against Brentford scheduled for 16 January, was postponed due to the COVID-19 cases within the Brentford squad.

==== Transfers ====
On 11 January, Sam Walker moved to AFC Wimbledon on loan for the remainder of the season.

On 22 January, Jökull Andrésson joined Morecambe on a week-long emergency loan deal. After facing Exeter City in his second and final game whilst on loan for Morecambe, Andrésson returned to Exeter City on loan for the remainder of the season on 29 January. On the same day, Sam Smith joined Cheltenham Town on loan for the remainder of the season.

=== February ===
On 3 February, Mamadi Camará signed his first professional contract with Reading, until the summer of 2022.

On 25 February, Nahum Melvin-Lambert signed his first professional contract with the Reading, until the summer of 2022 before joining St Patrick's Athletic on loan until June.

=== April ===
On 30 April, Michael Olise was named as the EA Sports Young Player of the Season and listed in the Sky Bet Championship Team of the Season.

=== May ===
On 7 May, Reading announced that Luke Southwood had signed a new two-year contract, keeping him at the club until the summer of 2023.

Prior to Reading's last game of the season, on 8 May, Josh Laurent was announced as the club's player of the season.

On 11 May, Reading announced that Michael Morrison had signed a new one-year contract with the club, whilst new contracts had also been offered to Tom McIntyre, Omar Richards, James Holden, Thierry Nevers and Femi Azeez with Ethan Bristow having a clause triggered in his contract to keep him at the club. Scholars Kian Leavy, Harvey Collins, Kelvin Ehibhatiomhan, Malachi Talent-Aryeety and Lynford Sackey were all offered professional contracts too. Reading also announced that Sone Aluko, Sam Baldock, Sam Walker, Tennai Watson, Ryan East, Conor Lawless, Oliver Pendlebury, Jayden Onen, Sam Smith, Joseph Ajose, Josh Hewitt, Omri Luzon, Augustus McGiff, Alfie Anderson, Jordan Hamilton-Olise and Yaw Turkson would all leave the club at the end of their contracts. The following day, 12 May, James Holden joined Maidenhead United on loan for the remainder of the season.

On 25 May, Reading announced that they had activated a clause in Thierry Nevers' contract, extending his contract until the summer of 2022 whilst also confirming he would be joining West Ham United for an undisclosed fee once the transfer window opens on 9 June.

== Transfers ==
=== In ===
Date	Position	Nationality	Name	From	Fee	Ref.
28 July 2020	MF	(England)	Josh Laurent	Shrewsbury Town	Free	
28 August 2020	MF	(England)	Ovie Ejaria	Liverpool	Undisclosed	
October 2020	FW	(Guinea-Bissau)	Mamadi Camará	Feirense	Undisclosed	
November 2020	MF	(England)	Jayden Onen	Brentford B	Free	
December 2021	DF	(Israel)	Omri Luzon	Maccabi Petah Tikva	Free	

=== Loans in ===
Start date	Position	Nationality	Name	From	End date	Ref.
22 September 2020	DF	(England)	Lewis Gibson	Everton	End of season	
4 October 2020	MF	(Guinea-Bissau)	Alfa Semedo	Benfica	End of season	
5 October 2020	DF	(Portugal)	Tomás Esteves	Porto	End of season	

=== Out ===
Date	Position	Nationality	Name	To	Fee	Ref.
10 September 2020	MF	(Scotland)	Jordan Holsgrove	Celta Vigo	Undisclosed	
25 May 2021†	FW	(England)	Thierry Nevers	West Ham United	Undisclosed	

† Nevers' move was announced on the above date, but was not active until 9 June 2021.

=== Loans out ===
Start date	Position	Nationality	Name	To	End date	Ref.
5 October 2020	FW	(Scotland)	Marc McNulty	Dundee United	End of season	
16 October 2020	FW	(England)	Sam Smith	Tranmere Rovers	7 January 2021	
27 October 2020	GK	(Iceland)	Jökull Andrésson	Exeter City	1 December 2020	
23 December 2020	GK	(England)	Sam Walker	Blackpool	6 January 2021	
11 January 2021	GK	(England)	Sam Walker	AFC Wimbledon	End of season	
22 January 2021	GK	(Iceland)	Jökull Andrésson	Morecambe	29 January 2021	
29 January 2021	GK	(Iceland)	Jökull Andrésson	Exeter City	End of season	
29 January 2021	FW	(England)	Sam Smith	Cheltenham Town	End of season	
25 February 2021	FW	(England)	Nahum Melvin-Lambert	St Patrick's Athletic	June 2021	
12 May 2021	GK	(England)	James Holden	Maidenhead United	End of season	

=== Released ===
Date	Position	Nationality	Name	Joined	Date	Ref
30 June 2021	GK	(England)	Sam Walker	Kilmarnock	6 July 2021	
30 June 2021	DF	(England)	Joseph Ajose	Queens Park Rangers	27 August 2021	
30 June 2021	DF	(England)	Josh Hewitt	Marquette Golden Eagles		
30 June 2021	DF	(England)	Omar Richards	Bayern Munich	1 July 2021	
30 June 2021	DF	(England)	Tennai Watson	Milton Keynes Dons	28 July 2021	
30 June 2021	DF	(Israel)	Omri Luzon	Hapoel Rishon LeZion	30 September 2021	
30 June 2021	MF	(England)	Ryan East	Swindon Town	7 August 2021	
30 June 2021	MF	(England)	Jordan Hamilton-Olise	Westfield		
30 June 2021	MF	(England)	Conor Lawless	Luton Town	21 September 2021	
30 June 2021	MF	(England)	Jayden Onen	Sheffield Wednesday	6 December 2021	
30 June 2021	MF	(England)	Oliver Pendlebury	Wycombe Wanderers	1 July 2021	
30 June 2021	MF	(England)	Yaw Turkson	Tiffin Dragons		
30 June 2021	FW	(England)	Alfie Anderson	Slough Town		
30 June 2021	FW	(England)	Sam Baldock	Derby County	17 August 2021	
30 June 2021	FW	(England)	Sam Smith	Cambridge United	7 July 2021	
30 June 2021	FW	(Nigeria)	Sone Aluko	Ipswich Town	6 August 2021	
30 June 2021	FW	(United States)	Augustus McGiff	College of Mount Saint Vincent		

=== Trial ===
Date from	Position	Nationality	Name	Date to	Ref.
1 September 2020	MF	(Spain)	Rodrigo Riquelme		
1 September 2020	FW	(United States)	Jordan Adebayo-Smith		

== Squad ==
As of match played 8 May 2021

No.	Name	Nationality	Position	Date of birth (age)	Signed from	Signed in	Contract ends	Apps.	Goals
Goalkeepers
1	Sam Walker	(England)	GK	2 October 1991 (aged 29)	Colchester United	2018	2021	14	0
22	Luke Southwood (Note: Luke Southwood was born in Oxford, England, representing England at U20 level before going on to make his international debut for Northern Ireland in March 2022.)	(England)	GK	6 December 1997 (aged 23)	Academy	2016	2023	4	0
33	Rafael Cabral	(Brazil)	GK	20 May 1990 (aged 30)	Sampdoria	2019	2022	91	0
40	Jökull Andrésson	(Iceland)	GK	25 August 2001 (aged 19)	Academy	2018	2022	0	0
Defenders
2	Tomás Esteves	(Portugal)	DF	3 April 2002 (aged 19)	loan from Porto	2020	2021	30	1
3	Omar Richards	(England)	DF	15 February 1998 (aged 23)	Academy	2016	2021	104	3
4	Michael Morrison	(England)	DF	3 March 1988 (aged 33)	Birmingham City	2019	2022	83	6
5	Tom McIntyre (Note: Tom McIntyre was born in Reading, England, but qualified to represent Scotland, representing them at U17, U20 and U21 level.)	(Scotland)	DF	6 November 1998 (aged 22)	Academy	2016	2021	44	2
6	Liam Moore (Note: Liam Moore was born in Loughborough, England, but qualified to represent Jamaica, and made his international debut for Jamaica in March 2021.)	(Jamaica)	DF	31 January 1993 (aged 28)	Leicester City	2016	2023	214	6
15	Lewis Gibson	(England)	DF	19 July 2000 (aged 20)	loan from Everton	2020	2021	13	0
17	Andy Yiadom (Note: Andy Yiadom was born in Holloway, England, but qualified to represent Ghana and made his international debut for Ghana in January 2017. He previously represented England at C level.)	(Ghana)	DF	2 December 1991 (aged 29)	Barnsley	2018	2022	94	3
29	Tom Holmes	(England)	DF	12 March 2000 (aged 21)	Academy	2017	2022	41	0
Midfielders
7	Michael Olise (Note: Michael Olise qualifies to represent England, Nigeria and France, making his international debut for France U18 in June 2019 at the 2019 Toulon Tournament.)	(France)	MF	12 December 2001 (aged 19)	Academy	2018	2022	73	7
8	Andy Rinomhota (Note: Rinomhota was born in Leeds, England, but qualified to represent Zimbabwe and made his international debut for Zimbabwe in November 2023.)	(England)	MF	21 April 1997 (aged 24)	Academy	2017	2022	118	4
10	John Swift	(England)	MF	23 June 1995 (aged 25)	Chelsea	2016	2022	164	23
14	Ovie Ejaria	(England)	MF	18 November 1997 (aged 23)	Liverpool	2020	2024	93	7
20	Felipe Araruna	(Brazil)	MF	12 March 1996 (aged 25)	São Paulo	2020	2022	7	0
28	Josh Laurent	(England)	MF	6 May 1995 (aged 26)	Shrewsbury Town	2020	2022	46	3
30	Alfa Semedo	(Guinea-Bissau)	MF	30 August 1997 (aged 23)	loan from Benfica	2020	2021	40	2
34	Dejan Tetek (Note: Tetek was born in Oxford, England, but qualified to represent Serbia and made his debut for Serbia U19 in MArch 2021.)	(Serbia)	MF	24 September 2002 (aged 18)	Academy	2019	2021	9	0
Forwards
9	Sam Baldock	(England)	FW	15 March 1989 (aged 32)	Brighton & Hove Albion	2018	2021	74	11
11	Yakou Méïté (Note: Yakou Méïte was born in Paris, France, but qualified to represent the Ivory Coast, representing the Ivory Coast at U17, U20 and U23 level.)	(Ivory Coast)	FW	11 February 1996 (aged 25)	Paris Saint-Germain	2016	2023	125	43
18	Lucas João (Note: Lucas João was born in Lisbon, Portugal, and represented Portugal twice in Friendly matches in 2015, before switching international allegiances to Angola in 2022, making his debut for against Guinea-Bissau in March 2022.)	(Portugal)	FW	4 September 1993 (aged 27)	Sheffield Wednesday	2019	2023	59	28
24	Sone Aluko (Note: Sone Aluko was born in Hounslow, England, but qualified to represent Nigeria and made his international debut for Nigeria in May 2009. He previously represented Nigeria at U20 and U23 level and England at U16, U17, U18 and U19 level.)	(Nigeria)	FW	19 February 1989 (aged 32)	Fulham	2017	2021	102	6
47	George Pușcaș	(Romania)	FW	8 April 1996 (aged 25)	Inter Milan	2019	2024	64	18
	Sam Smith	(England)	FW	8 March 1998 (aged 23)	Academy	2016	2021	11	2
U23
31	Coniah Boyce-Clarke (Note: Coniah Boyce-Clarke was born in England, but qualified to represent Jamaica, and made his international debut for Jamaica U20 in June 2022.)	(England)	GK	1 March 2003 (aged 18)	Academy	2019		0	0
35	Imari Samuels	(England)	DF	5 February 2003 (aged 18)	Academy	2019		0	0
36	Nelson Abbey	(England)	DF	28 August 2003 (aged 17)	Academy	2019	2022	1	0
38	Ethan Bristow (Note: Ethan Bristow was born in England, but qualified to represent Saint Kitts and Nevis, and made his international debut for Saint Kitts and Nevis in November 2023.)	(England)	DF	27 November 2001 (aged 19)	Academy	2018		3	0
39	Oliver Pendlebury	(England)	MF	19 January 2002 (aged 19)	Academy	2018		1	0
41	Joseph Ajose	(England)	DF	29 January 2001 (aged 20)	Port Vale	2020		0	0
42	Lynford Sackey	(England)	FW	18 February 2003 (aged 18)	Academy	2019		1	0
43	Tennai Watson	(England)	DF	4 March 1997 (age 29)	Academy	2015	2021	9	0
44	Ryan East	(England)	MF	7 August 1998 (aged 22)	Academy	2016	2021	1	0
45	Femi Azeez (Note: Azeez was born in Westminster, England, but qualified to represent Nigeria and made his international debut for Nigeria in May 2026.)	(England)	MF	5 June 2001 (aged 19)	Wealdstone	2019	2021	1	0
46	Jayden Onen	(England)	MF	17 February 2001 (aged 20)	Brentford B	2020		2	0
48	Jeriel Dorsett (Note: Jeriel Dorsett was born in Enfield, England, but qualified to represent Montserrat and made his international debut for Montserrat in September 2023. He previously represented England at U18 level.)	(England)	DF	4 May 2002 (aged 19)	Academy	2018	2022	2	0
49	Conor Lawless	(England)	MF	13 September 2001 (aged 19)	Academy	2018	2021	1	0
50	Mamadi Camará	(Guinea-Bissau)	FW	31 December 2003 (aged 17)	Feirense	2020	2022	2	0
	Josh Hewitt	(England)	DF	19 September 2001 (aged 19)	Academy	2018	2021	0	0
	Omri Luzon	(Israel)	DF	7 January 1999 (aged 22)	Maccabi Petah Tikva	2020	2021	0	0
	Thierry Nevers	(England)	MF	5 February 2001 (aged 20)	Academy	2018	2022	0	0
	Claudio Osorio (Note: Claudio Osorio was born in Fatuhada, Timor-Leste, but qualified to represent England representing them at U15 & U16 level before going on to make his international debut for Timor-Leste in September 2024.)	(England)	MF	26 September 2002 (aged 18)	Academy	2019		0	0
	Kian Leavy	(Republic of Ireland)	MF	21 March 2002 (aged 19)	Academy	2018		0	0
	Augustus McGiff	(United States)	FW	1 July 2002 (aged 18)	New York City FC Academy	2019		0	0
U18
	Harvey Collins	(England)	GK	5 November 2002 (aged 18)	Academy	2019		0	0
	Matt Rowley	(England)	GK	30 July 2004 (aged 16)	Academy	2020		0	0
	Kelvin Abrefa (Note: Kelvin Abrefa was born in Italy to Ghanaian parents, going on to make his debut for Ghana U20 in June 2022.)	(Italy)	DF	9 December 2003 (aged 17)	Academy	2020		0	0
	Jordan Addo-Antoine	(England)	DF	20 April 2004 (aged 17)	Academy	2020		0	0
	Jordan Hamilton-Olise	(England)	DF	9 February 2003 (aged 18)	Academy	2019		0	0
	Louie Holzman	(England)	DF	16 November 2003 (aged 17)	Academy	2020		0	0
	Sam Paul	(England)	DF	13 October 2003 (aged 17)	Academy	2020		0	0
	Michael Stickland	(England)	DF	9 November 2003 (aged 17)	Academy	2020		0	0
	Hamid Abdel-Salam	(England)	MF	19 October 2003 (aged 17)	Academy	2020		0	0
	Jack Senga	(Belgium)	MF	27 January 2004 (aged 17)	Academy	2020		0	0
	Malachi Talent-Aryeetey	(England)	MF	10 September 2002 (aged 18)	Academy	2019		0	0
	Yaw Turkson	(England)	MF	6 March 2003 (aged 18)	Academy	2019		0	0
	Benjamin Purcell	(Wales)	MF	25 August 2004 (aged 16)	Academy	2020		0	0
	Alfie Anderson	(England)	FW	6 September 2002 (aged 18)	Academy	2019		0	0
	Jahmari Clarke (Note: Jahmari Clarke was born in England, but qualified to represent Jamaica, and made his international debut for Jamaica U20 in June 2022.)	(England)	FW	17 August 2003 (aged 17)	Academy	2020		0	0
	Harvey Maudner	(England)	FW	7 October 2003 (aged 17)	Academy	2020		0	0
	David Nyarko	(England)	FW	7 October 2002 (aged 18)	Academy	2020		0	0
Out on loan
12	Marc McNulty	(Scotland)	FW	14 September 1992 (aged 28)	Coventry City	2018	2022	17	1
37	Nahum Melvin-Lambert (Note: ahum Melvin-Lambert was born in England, but qualified to represent Saint Lucia, and made his international debut for Saint Lucia in June 2023.)	(England)	FW	21 October 2002 (aged 18)	Academy	2019	2022	3	0
	James Holden	(England)	GK	4 September 2001 (aged 19)	Bury	2019		0	0
Left during the season
	Jordan Holsgrove	(Scotland)	MF	10 September 1999 (aged 21)	Academy	2017	2021	0	0

== Friendlies ==
22 August 2020	Reading	2–1	Gillingham	Reading
13:30 BST (UTC+1)	João 22'; Rinomhota 23'	Report	Akinde 51' (pen.)	Stadium: Madejski Stadium; Attendance: 0
Note: Match played behind closed doors, and split into three 30-minute periods.

28 August 2020	Tottenham Hotspur	4–1	Reading	London
15:30 BST (UTC+1)	Richards 7' (o.g.); Alli 21'; Son 39'; Lamela 52'	Report	Pușcaș 80' (pen.)	Stadium: Tottenham Hotspur Stadium; Attendance: 0
Note: Match played behind closed doors

1 September 2020	Portimonense	0–0	Reading	Portimão, Portugal
18:00 BST (UTC+1)		Report		Stadium: Estádio Municipal; Attendance: 0
Note: Match played behind closed doors

=== U23 ===
15 August 2020	Leyton Orient	2–0	Reading U23	London
13:00 BST (UTC+1)	Clay 25'; Angol 89'	Report		Stadium: Brisbane Road; Attendance: 0

17 November 2020	Crawley Town	0–0	Reading U23	Three Bridges
12:00 GMT (UTC)				Stadium: Jubilee Field; Attendance: 0

== Competitions ==
=== Overview ===
Competition	First match	Last match	Starting round	Final position	Record							
Competition	First match	Last match	Starting round	Final position	Pld	W	D	L	GF	GA	GD	Win %
EFL Championship	12 September 2020	May 2021	Matchday 1	7th	46	19	13	14	62	54	+8	41.30
FA Cup	9 January 2021	9 January 2021	Third round	Third round	1	0	0	1	0	1	−1	0.00
EFL Cup	5 September 2020	15 September 2020	First round	Second round	2	1	0	1	3	2	+1	50.00
Total					49	20	13	16	65	57	+8	40.82

Last updated: 8 May 2021
Source: Competitions

=== Championship ===
==== League table ====
Pos	Team	Pld	W	D	L	GF	GA	GD	Pts	Promotion, qualification or relegation
4	Swansea City	46	23	11	12	56	39	+17	80	Qualification for Championship play-offs
5	Barnsley	46	23	9	14	58	50	+8	78	Qualification for Championship play-offs
6	Bournemouth	46	22	11	13	73	46	+27	77	Qualification for Championship play-offs
7	Reading	46	19	13	14	62	54	+8	70	
8	Cardiff City	46	18	14	14	66	49	+17	68	
9	Queens Park Rangers	46	19	11	16	57	55	+2	68	
10	Middlesbrough	46	18	10	18	55	53	+2	64	

Source: EFL Official Website
Rules for classification: 1) Points; 2) Goal difference; 3) Number of goals scored; 4) Head-to-head results; 5) Wins; 6) Away goals; 7) Penalty points (sec 9.5); 8) 12-point sending off offences

==== Results summary ====
Overall								Home						Away					
Pld	W	D	L	GF	GA	GD	Pts	W	D	L	GF	GA	GD	W	D	L	GF	GA	GD
46	19	13	14	62	54	+8	70	12	4	7	37	27	+10	7	9	7	25	27	−2

Last updated: 8 May 2021.
Source: Results

==== Results by matchday ====
Matchday	1	2	3	4	5	6	7	8	9	10	11	12	13	14	15	16	17	18	19	20	21	22	23	24	25	26	27	28	29	30	31	32	33	34	35	36	37	38	39	40	41	42	43	44	45	46
Ground	A	H	A	H	A	H	H	A	A	H	H	A	A	H	A	H	H	A	H	A	H	A	A	H	A	H	A	H	H	A	H	A	A	H	H	A	A	H	A	H	A	H	A	H	A	H
Result	W	W	W	W	D	W	W	W	L	L	L	L	D	W	D	W	L	W	L	L	W	D	W	W	D	W	D	L	L	W	L	L	W	W	W	D	L	D	D	W	L	D	D	D	L	D
Position	1	1	1	2	2	1	1	1	1	1	1	6	6	5	4	3	5	5	5	8	6	6	5	5	5	4	4	5	5	5	5	5	5	5	5	5	6	6	6	6	7	7	7	7	7	7

Updated to match(es) played on 8 May 2021. Source: Results
A = Away; H = Home; W = Win; D = Draw; L = Loss; P = Postponed

==== Results ====
12 September 2020 1	Derby County	0–2	Reading	Derby
BST (UTC+1)	Shinnie (yellow card) 37'; Sibley (yellow card) 45+3'; Byrne (yellow card) 47'	Report	João 40'; Ejaria 45+1'; Olise (yellow card) 64'; Richards (yellow card) 90+3'	Stadium: Pride Park; Attendance: 0 Referee: Darren Bond
Note: Match played behind closed doors due to the COVID-19 pandemic in the United Kingdom.

19 September 2020 2	Reading	2–0	Barnsley	Reading
15:00 BST (UTC+1)	Laurent (yellow card) 49'; Méïté 67'; Olise 77'	Report	Andersen (yellow card) 23' (yellow-red card) 68'; Helik (red card) 42'; Ritzmaier (yellow card) 45+1'; Mowatt (yellow card) 74'	Stadium: Madejski Stadium; Attendance: 0 Referee: Tim Robinson
Note: Match played behind closed doors due to the COVID-19 pandemic in the United Kingdom.

26 September 2020 3	Cardiff City	1–2	Reading	Cardiff
15:00 BST (UTC+1)	Hoilett (yellow card) 18'; K.Moore (yellow card) 53'; Tomlin 81'	Report	Morrison 47'; João 66'; Olise (yellow card) 90+5'	Stadium: Cardiff City Stadium; Attendance: 0 Referee: David Webb
Note: Match played behind closed doors due to the COVID-19 pandemic in the United Kingdom.

3 October 2020 4	Reading	1–0	Watford	Reading
15:00 BST (UTC+1)	Laurent (yellow card) 39'; Pușcaș 41'; Richards (yellow card) 62'; Tetek (yellow card) 88'	Report	Wilmot (yellow card) 40'; João Pedro (yellow card) 88'; Chalobah (yellow card) 90+3'	Stadium: Madejski Stadium; Attendance: 0 Referee: Gavin Ward
Note: Match played behind closed doors due to the COVID-19 pandemic in the United Kingdom.

17 October 2020 5	Middlesbrough	0–0	Reading	Middlesbrough
15:00 BST (UTC+1)	Morsy (yellow card) 75'; McNair (yellow card) 80'	Report	Moore (yellow card) 47'; Richards (yellow card) 73'; Holmes (yellow card) 76'	Stadium: Riverside Stadium; Attendance: 0 Referee: Darren Bond
Note: Match played behind closed doors due to the COVID-19 pandemic in the United Kingdom.

20 October 2020 6	Reading	1–0	Wycombe Wanderers	Reading
20:00 BST (UTC+1)	João (yellow card) 35' (goal) 64'; Rinomhota (yellow card) 79'	Report		Stadium: Madejski Stadium; Attendance: 0 Referee: Andy Davies
Note: Match played behind closed doors due to the COVID-19 pandemic in the United Kingdom.

24 October 2020 7	Reading	3–0	Rotherham United	Reading
15:00 BST (UTC+1)	Méïté 41', 79'; João 90+3' (pen.)	Report	Wood (yellow card) 90'; Ihiekwe (yellow card) 90+3'	Stadium: Madejski Stadium; Attendance: 0 Referee: Matt Donohue
Note: Match played behind closed doors due to the COVID-19 pandemic in the United Kingdom.

27 October 2020 8	Blackburn Rovers	2–4	Reading	Blackburn
19:45 GMT (UTC)	Armstrong 3', 66'; Holtby (yellow card) 5'; Trybull (yellow card) 20'	Report	Méïté 1'; Olise 15'; Laurent 18'; Rafael (yellow card) 76'; João (yellow card) 79' (goal) 82'	Stadium: Ewood Park; Attendance: 0 Referee: David Coote
Note: Match played behind closed doors due to the COVID-19 pandemic in the United Kingdom.

30 October 2020 9	Coventry City	3–2	Reading	Birmingham
19:45 GMT (UTC)	Hamer 23' (yellow card) 42'; Østigård (yellow card) 38'; Godden 75'; Rose (yellow card) 79'; Hyam (yellow card) 82'; McCallum 85'; Maroši (yellow card) 87'	Report	João 66'; Pușcaș 90+2'	Stadium: St Andrew's; Attendance: 0 Referee: David Webb
Note: Match played at St Andrew's in Birmingham due to Coventry City ground sharing with Birmingham City. Match played behind closed doors due to the COVID-19 pandemic in the United Kingdom.

4 November 2020 10	Reading	0–3	Preston North End	Reading
19:00 GMT (UTC)	Laurent (yellow card) 86'	Report	Fisher (yellow card) 15'; Sinclair 65'; Jakobsen 68'; Browne (yellow card) 87'; Potts 90+2'	Stadium: Madejski Stadium; Attendance: 0 Referee: John Brooks
Note: Match played behind closed doors due to the COVID-19 pandemic in the United Kingdom.

7 November 2020 11	Reading	0–3	Stoke City	Reading
12:30 GMT (UTC)		Report	Thompson (yellow card) 4'; Campbell 23'; Fletcher 35'; McClean (yellow card) 86'; Brown 90+5'	Stadium: Madejski Stadium; Attendance: 0 Referee: Keith Stroud
Note: Match played behind closed doors due to the COVID-19 pandemic in the United Kingdom.

21 November 2020 12	Bournemouth	4–2	Reading	Bournemouth
12:30 GMT (UTC)	Begović (yellow card) 4'; Solanke 56', 89'; Danjuma 59' (yellow card) 74'; L.Cook 77'; Lerma (yellow card) 79'	Report	João 4' (pen.); Aluko 43'; Rinomhota (yellow card) 54'	Stadium: Dean Court; Attendance: 0 Referee: Darren Bond
Note: Match played behind closed doors due to the COVID-19 pandemic in the United Kingdom.

25 November 2020 13	Millwall	1–1	Reading	Bermondsey
19:00 GMT (UTC)	Cooper (yellow card) 10'; J.Wallace 45+1'; Williams (yellow card) 52'; Hutchinson (yellow card) 70'; Leonard (yellow card) 85'	Report	Semedo (yellow card) 30'; João 54'; Morrison (yellow card) 55'; Ejaria (yellow card) 59'; Holmes (yellow card) 75'	Stadium: The Den; Attendance: 0 Referee: Leigh Doughty
Note: Match played behind closed doors due to the COVID-19 pandemic in the United Kingdom.

28 November 2020 14	Reading	3–1	Bristol City	Reading
12:30 GMT (UTC)	Ejaria 54'; Méïté 76'; João 90+2'	Report	Moore (yellow card) 65'; Martin (yellow card) 70'; Wells 73'	Stadium: Madejski Stadium; Attendance: 0 Referee: Jeremy Simpson
Note: Match played behind closed doors due to the COVID-19 pandemic in the United Kingdom.

2 December 2020 15	Sheffield Wednesday	1–1	Reading	Sheffield
19:45 GMT (UTC)	Paterson 12' (yellow card) 59'; Shaw (red card) 30'; Luongo (yellow card) 53'	Report	João 44'	Stadium: Hillsborough Stadium; Attendance: 0 Referee: Oliver Langford
Note: Match played behind closed doors due to the COVID-19 pandemic in the United Kingdom.

5 December 2020 16	Reading	2–0	Nottingham Forest	Reading
12:30 GMT (UTC)	João 16' (pen.); Morrison 53'; Richards (yellow card) 83'	Report	Yates (red card) 14'; Cafú (yellow card) 90+1'	Stadium: Madejski Stadium; Attendance: 2,000; Referee: Gavin Ward

9 December 2020 17	Reading	1–2	Birmingham City	Reading
19:45 GMT (UTC)	Méïté 61' (yellow card) 90+3'; João (penalty missed) 71'	Report	Toral 29', 37'; Hogan (yellow card) 39'; Dean (yellow card) 66' (yellow-red card) 70'; Etheridge (yellow card) 80'; Leko (yellow card) 88'	Stadium: Madejski Stadium; Attendance: 2,000; Referee: Tim Robinson

12 December 2020 18	Queens Park Rangers	0–1	Reading	White City
15:00 GMT (UTC)	Carroll (yellow card) 67'	Report	Olise 89'	Stadium: Loftus Road; Attendance: 2,000; Referee: Tony Harrington

16 December 2020 19	Reading	1–2	Norwich City	Reading
19:45 GMT (UTC)	Olise 14'; Onen (yellow card) 83'	Report	Buendía 11'; Pukki 55' (pen.)	Stadium: Madejski Stadium; Attendance: 2,000; Referee: Geoff Eltringham

19 December 2020 20	Brentford	3–1	Reading	Brentford
15:00 GMT (UTC)	Jensen 11' (yellow card) 45'; Mbeumo 23', 29'; Janelt (yellow card) 90+3'	Report	Baldock (yellow card) 53'; Aluko 64'	Stadium: Brentford Community Stadium; Attendance: 0 Referee: Keith Stroud
Note: Match played behind closed doors due to the COVID-19 pandemic in the United Kingdom.

26 December 2020 21	Reading	2–1	Luton Town	Reading
15:00 GMT (UTC)	McIntyre 9' (yellow card) 44'; Semedo 41'	Report	Cranie (yellow card) 25'; LuaLua (yellow card) 75' (goal) 90'	Stadium: Madejski Stadium; Attendance: 0 Referee: Matt Donohue
Note: Match played behind closed doors due to the COVID-19 pandemic in the United Kingdom.

30 December 2020 22	Swansea City	0–0	Reading	Swansea
20:00 GMT (UTC)	Bennett (yellow card) 45+1'	Report		Stadium: Liberty Stadium; Attendance: 0 Referee: David Webb
Note: Match played behind closed doors due to the COVID-19 pandemic in the United Kingdom.

2 January 2021 23	Huddersfield Town	1–2	Reading	Huddersfield
15:00 GMT (UTC)	Campbell 6'; Mbenza (yellow card) 44'; Toffolo (yellow card) 69'	Report	João 52', 65'; Holmes (yellow card) 62'	Stadium: Kirklees Stadium; Attendance: 0 Referee: Jeremy Simpson
Note: Match played behind closed doors due to the COVID-19 pandemic in the United Kingdom.

19 January 2021 25	Reading	3–0	Coventry City	Reading
18:00 GMT (UTC)	João 16' (yellow card) 87'; Holmes (yellow card) 29'; Rinomhota 46'; Swift 71'; Morrison (yellow card) 90'	Report	McFadzean (yellow card) 60' (yellow-red card) 71'; Østigård (yellow card) 80'	Stadium: Madejski Stadium; Attendance: 0 Referee: Dean Whitestone
Note: Match played behind closed doors due to the COVID-19 pandemic in the United Kingdom.

24 January 2021 26	Preston North End	0–0	Reading	Preston
12:30 GMT (UTC)	Molumby (yellow card) 65'; Huntington (yellow card) 83'; Ledson (yellow card) 87'; Whiteman (yellow card) 87'	Report	João (penalty missed) 83'	Stadium: Deepdale; Attendance: 0 Referee: Geoff Eltringham
Note: Match played behind closed doors due to the COVID-19 pandemic in the United Kingdom.

29 January 2021 27	Reading	3–1	Bournemouth	Reading
20:00 GMT (UTC)	Laurent 24'; McIntyre 32'; Swift (yellow card) 34'; João 43'	Report	Rico (yellow card) 31'; Stanislas 85'	Stadium: Madejski Stadium; Attendance: 0 Referee: James Linington
Note: Match played behind closed doors due to the COVID-19 pandemic in the United Kingdom.

6 February 2021 28	Stoke City	0–0	Reading	Stoke-on-Trent
15:00 GMT (UTC)	McClean (yellow card) 24'; Batth (yellow card) 64'; Brown (yellow card) 86'	Report		Stadium: Bet365 Stadium; Attendance: 0 Referee: Tim Robinson
Note: Match played behind closed doors due to the COVID-19 pandemic in the United Kingdom.

10 February 2021 24	Reading	1–3	Brentford	Reading
19:00 GMT (UTC)	João 25' (pen.); Richards (yellow card) 74'	Report	Dasilva 36', 86'; Toney 88'	Stadium: Madejski Stadium; Attendance: 0 Referee: Tony Harrington
Note: Match originally scheduled and postponed on 16 January due to the COVID-19 cases within the Brentford squad. Match played behind closed doors due to the COVID-19 pandemic in the United Kingdom.

13 February 2021 29	Reading	1–2	Millwall	Reading
15:00 GMT (UTC)	Semedo 18'	Report	Hutchinson (yellow card) 65'; Smith 76'; Bennett 85'; Wallace (yellow card) 90'	Stadium: Madejski Stadium; Attendance: 0 Referee: Andy Woolmer
Note: Match played behind closed doors due to the COVID-19 pandemic in the United Kingdom.

16 February 2021 30	Bristol City	0–2	Reading	Bristol
19:45 GMT (UTC)	Hunt (yellow card) 20'; Lansbury (yellow card) 67'; T.Moore (yellow card) 76'; Bakinson (yellow card) 90+3'	Report	Richards (yellow card) 37'; João 42'; Morrison 45'; Ejaria (yellow card) 69'; Olise (yellow card) 75'	Stadium: Ashton Gate; Attendance: 0 Referee: Oliver Langford
Note: Match played behind closed doors due to the COVID-19 pandemic in the United Kingdom.

20 February 2021 31	Reading	0–2	Middlesbrough	Reading
15:00 GMT (UTC)	Richards (yellow card) 43'; Rinomhota (yellow card) 59'	Report	Fletcher 22' (yellow card) 90+1'; Bola 29'; Howson (yellow card) 71'	Stadium: Madejski Stadium; Attendance: 0 Referee: David Webb
Note: Match played behind closed doors due to the COVID-19 pandemic in the United Kingdom.

23 February 2021 32	Wycombe Wanderers	1–0	Reading	High Wycombe
19:45 GMT (UTC)	Knight (yellow card) 41'; McCleary (yellow card) 45+1'; Onyedinma 49'; Tafazolli (red card) 69'; Ikpeazu (penalty missed) 85'	Report	João (penalty missed) 70'; Pușcaș (yellow card) 83'; McIntyre (yellow card) 84'	Stadium: Adams Park; Attendance: 0 Referee: Dean Whitestone
Note: Match played behind closed doors due to the COVID-19 pandemic in the United Kingdom.

27 February 2021 33	Rotherham United	0–1	Reading	Rotherham
15:00 GMT (UTC)	A.MacDonald (yellow card) 64'; Wiles (yellow card) 85'; Olosunde (yellow card) 90'	Report	Morrison 26'	Stadium: New York Stadium; Attendance: 0 Referee: David Coote
Note: Match played behind closed doors due to the COVID-19 pandemic in the United Kingdom.

2 March 2021 34	Reading	1–0	Blackburn Rovers	Reading
20:00 GMT (UTC)	Semedo (yellow card) 17'; Pușcaș 24'	Report	Bell (yellow card) 52'; Evans (yellow card) 58'	Stadium: Madejski Stadium; Attendance: 0 Referee: Gavin Ward
Note: Match played behind closed doors due to the COVID-19 pandemic in the United Kingdom.

6 March 2021 35	Reading	3–0	Sheffield Wednesday	Reading
15:00 GMT (UTC)	Olise 30' (pen.); Moore (yellow card) 37'; João 65'; Yiadom 88'	Report	Börner (red card) 29'	Stadium: Madejski Stadium; Attendance: 0 Referee: James Linington
Note: Match played behind closed doors due to the COVID-19 pandemic in the United Kingdom.

13 March 2021 36	Nottingham Forest	1–1	Reading	West Bridgford
15:00 GMT (UTC)	Holmes 49' (o.g.)	Report	Méïté 81'; Figueiredo (yellow card) 90+2'	Stadium: City Ground; Attendance: 0 Referee: Steve Martin
Note: Match played behind closed doors due to the COVID-19 pandemic in the United Kingdom.

17 March 2021 37	Birmingham City	2–1	Reading	Birmingham
19:45 GMT (UTC)	Jutkiewicz 4'; Colin (yellow card) 22'; Gardner (yellow card) 28'; Dean 72'	Report	Méïté 35'	Stadium: St Andrew's; Attendance: 0 Referee: Andy Woolmer
Note: Match played behind closed doors due to the COVID-19 pandemic in the United Kingdom.

20 March 2021 38	Reading	1–1	Queens Park Rangers	Reading
15:00 GMT (UTC)	Méïté 57'	Report	Dykes 45'; Chair (yellow card) 52'	Stadium: Madejski Stadium; Attendance: 0 Referee: Dean Whitestone
Note: Match played behind closed doors due to the COVID-19 pandemic in the United Kingdom.

2 April 2021 39	Barnsley	1–1	Reading	Barnsley
17:30 BST (UTC+1)	Woodrow (yellow card) 18'; Palmer (yellow card) 25'; Mowatt 61' (pen.); Halme (yellow card) 68'	Report	Ejaria 34'	Stadium: Oakwell; Attendance: 0 Referee: Geoff Eltringham
Note: Match played behind closed doors due to the COVID-19 pandemic in the United Kingdom.

5 April 2021 40	Reading	3–1	Derby County	Reading
15:00 BST (UTC+1)	Olise 45+3'; Moore (yellow card) 50'; Pușcaș 57'; Laurent (yellow card) 83'; João 84'	Report	Lawrence 79'	Stadium: Madejski Stadium; Attendance: 0 Referee: Jonathan Moss
Note: Match played behind closed doors due to the COVID-19 pandemic in the United Kingdom.

9 April 2021 41	Watford	2–0	Reading	Watford
19:45 BST (UTC+1)	Sarr 12', 14'; Zinckernagel (yellow card) 17'; Hughes (yellow card) 75'; Success (yellow card) 90+3'	Report	Rinomhota (yellow card) 56'	Stadium: Vicarage Road; Attendance: 0 Referee: James Linington
Note: Match played behind closed doors due to the COVID-19 pandemic in the United Kingdom.

16 April 2021 42	Reading	1–1	Cardiff City	Reading
18:00 BST (UTC+1)	Méïté 90+5'	Report	Nelson (yellow card) 46'; Pack (yellow card) 50'; Brown (yellow card) 78'; K.Moore 87' (pen.)	Stadium: Madejski Stadium; Attendance: 0 Referee: John Brooks
Note: Match played behind closed doors due to the COVID-19 pandemic in the United Kingdom.

21 April 2021 43	Luton Town	0–0	Reading	Luton
19:45 BST (UTC+1)	Bradley (yellow card) 44'; Collins (yellow card) 90+2'	Report	Yiadom (yellow card) 35'	Stadium: Kenilworth Road; Attendance: 0 Referee: Michael Salisbury
Note: Match played behind closed doors due to the COVID-19 pandemic in the United Kingdom.

25 April 2021 44	Reading	2–2	Swansea City	Reading
12:00 BST (UTC+1)	Holmes (yellow card) 19'; Méïté 31'; Esteves 90+3'	Report	Guéhi (yellow card) 17'; Lowe 67'; Fulton (yellow card) 69'; Ayew 83'	Stadium: Madejski Stadium; Attendance: 0 Referee: Simon Hooper
Note: Match played behind closed doors due to the COVID-19 pandemic in the United Kingdom.

1 May 2021 45	Norwich City	4–1	Reading	Norwich
15:00 BST (UTC+1)	Aarons (yellow card) 17'; Dowell 30', 64'; Skipp (yellow card) 42'; Quintillà 78'; Pukki 85'	Report	Laurent 12'; Richards (yellow card) 25'; Semedo (yellow card) 77'	Stadium: Carrow Road; Attendance: 0 Referee: Oliver Langford
Note: Match played behind closed doors due to the COVID-19 pandemic in the United Kingdom.

8 May 2021 46	Reading	2–2	Huddersfield Town	Reading
12:30 BST (UTC+1)	Semedo (yellow card) 14'; Olise 19' (pen.); Méïté 26'	Report	Koroma 15'; Vallejo (yellow card) 80'; Edmonds-Green 90+3'	Stadium: Madejski Stadium; Attendance: 0 Referee: Jarred Gillett
Note: Match played behind closed doors due to the COVID-19 pandemic in the United Kingdom.

=== EFL Cup ===
5 September 2020 First round	Reading	3–1	Colchester United	Reading
15:00 BST (UTC+1)	João 45+1', 56', 75'	Report	Brown 37'	Stadium: Madejski Stadium; Attendance: 0 Referee: Josh Smith
Note: Match played behind closed doors due to the COVID-19 pandemic in the United Kingdom.

15 September 2020 Second round	Reading	0–1	Luton Town	Reading
18:00 BST (UTC+1)		Report	Clark 24'; LuaLua (yellow card) 62'; Bradley (yellow card) 78'	Stadium: Madejski Stadium; Attendance: 0 Referee: Charles Breakspear
Note: Match played behind closed doors due to the COVID-19 pandemic in the United Kingdom.

=== FA Cup ===
The third round draw was made on 30 November, with Premier League and EFL Championship clubs all entering the competition.

9 January 2021 Third round	Luton Town	1–0	Reading	Luton
12:00 GMT (UTC)	Moncur 30'	Report		Stadium: Kenilworth Road; Attendance: 0 Referee: Darren Bond
Note: Match played behind closed doors due to the COVID-19 pandemic in the United Kingdom.

== Squad statistics ==
As of match played 8 May 2021

=== Appearances and goals ===
No.	Pos	Nat	Player	Total		Championship		FA Cup		League Cup	
No.	Pos	Nat	Player	Apps	Goals	Apps	Goals	Apps	Goals	Apps	Goals
2	DF	(Portugal) POR	Tomás Esteves	30	1	12+17	1	1	0	0	0
3	DF	(England) ENG	Omar Richards	42	0	38+3	0	0	0	0+1	0
4	DF	(England) ENG	Michael Morrison	36	4	35	4	0	0	1	0
5	DF	(Scotland) SCO	Tom McIntyre	28	2	16+10	2	1	0	1	0
6	DF	(Jamaica) JAM	Liam Moore	33	0	31+1	0	0	0	1	0
7	MF	(France) FRA	Michael Olise	46	7	37+7	7	1	0	1	0
8	MF	(England) ENG	Andy Rinomhota	43	1	41+1	1	0	0	0+1	0
9	FW	(England) ENG	Sam Baldock	23	0	4+16	0	1	0	2	0
10	MF	(England) ENG	John Swift	14	1	10+4	1	0	0	0	0
11	FW	(Ivory Coast) CIV	Yakou Méïté	25	12	19+6	12	0	0	0	0
14	MF	(England) ENG	Ovie Ejaria	38	3	37+1	3	0	0	0	0
15	DF	(England) ENG	Lewis Gibson	13	0	7+6	0	0	0	0	0
17	DF	(Ghana) GHA	Andy Yiadom	21	1	18+3	1	0	0	0	0
18	FW	(Portugal) POR	Lucas João	40	22	35+4	19	0	0	1	3
20	MF	(Brazil) BRA	Felipe Araruna	4	0	2	0	0	0	2	0
22	GK	(England) ENG	Luke Southwood	4	0	1	0	1	0	2	0
24	FW	(Nigeria) NGA	Sone Aluko	36	2	9+24	2	1	0	2	0
28	MF	(England) ENG	Josh Laurent	46	3	45	3	0	0	1	0
29	DF	(England) ENG	Tom Holmes	40	0	30+9	0	0	0	1	0
30	MF	(Guinea-Bissau) GNB	Alfa Semedo	40	2	24+15	2	1	0	0	0
33	GK	(Brazil) BRA	Rafael Cabral	45	0	45	0	0	0	0	0
34	MF	(Serbia) SRB	Dejan Tetek	9	0	1+6	0	0+1	0	1	0
36	DF	(England) ENG	Nelson Abbey	1	0	0	0	0	0	0+1	0
38	DF	(England) ENG	Ethan Bristow	3	0	0	0	1	0	2	0
39	MF	(England) ENG	Oliver Pendlebury	1	0	0	0	1	0	0	0
42	FW	(England) ENG	Lynford Sackey	1	0	0	0	0	0	0+1	0
43	DF	(England) ENG	Tennai Watson	2	0	0+1	0	0	0	1	0
45	MF	(England) ENG	Femi Azeez	1	0	0+1	0	0	0	0	0
46	MF	(England) ENG	Jayden Onen	2	0	0+1	0	1	0	0	0
47	FW	(Romania) ROU	George Pușcaș	22	4	9+12	4	0	0	1	0
48	DF	(England) ENG	Jeriel Dorsett	1	0	0	0	1	0	0	0
49	MF	(England) ENG	Conor Lawless	1	0	0	0	0+1	0	0	0
50	FW	(Guinea-Bissau) GNB	Mamadi Camará	2	0	0+1	0	0+1	0	0	0
Players away on loan:
12	FW	(Scotland) SCO	Marc McNulty	2	0	0	0	0	0	2	0
37	FW	(England) ENG	Nahum Melvin-Lambert	3	0	0	0	0+1	0	0+2	0
Players who appeared for Reading but left during the season:

=== Goal scorers ===
Place	Position	Nation	Number	Name	Championship	FA Cup	League Cup	Total
1	FW	(Portugal)	18	Lucas João	19	0	3	22
2	FW	(Ivory Coast)	11	Yakou Méïté	12	0	0	12
3	MF	(France)	7	Michael Olise	7	0	0	7
4	DF	(England)	4	Michael Morrison	4	0	0	4
4	FW	(Romania)	47	George Pușcaș	4	0	0	4
6	MF	(England)	14	Ovie Ejaria	3	0	0	3
6	MF	(England)	28	Josh Laurent	3	0	0	3
8	FW	(Nigeria)	24	Sone Aluko	2	0	0	2
8	DF	(Scotland)	5	Tom McIntyre	2	0	0	2
8	MF	(Guinea-Bissau)	30	Alfa Semedo	2	0	0	2
11	MF	(England)	8	Andy Rinomhota	1	0	0	1
11	MF	(England)	10	John Swift	1	0	0	1
11	DF	(Ghana)	17	Andy Yiadom	1	0	0	1
11	DF	(Portugal)	2	Tomás Esteves	1	0	0	1
Total					62	0	3	65

=== Clean sheets ===
Place	Position	Nation	Number	Name	Championship	FA Cup	League Cup	Total
1	GK	(Brazil)	33	Rafael Cabral	17	0	0	17
TOTALS					17	0	0	17

=== Disciplinary record ===
Number	Nation	Position	Name	Championship		FA Cup		League Cup		Total	
Number	Nation	Position	Name	Booked	Sent off (straight red)	Booked	Sent off (straight red)	Booked	Sent off (straight red)	Booked	Sent off (straight red)
3	(England)	DF	Omar Richards	8	0	0	0	0	0	8	0
4	(England)	DF	Michael Morrison	2	0	0	0	0	0	2	0
5	(Scotland)	DF	Tom McIntyre	2	0	0	0	0	0	2	0
6	(Jamaica)	DF	Liam Moore	3	0	0	0	0	0	3	0
7	(France)	MF	Michael Olise	3	0	0	0	0	0	3	0
8	(England)	MF	Andy Rinomhota	4	0	0	0	0	0	4	0
9	(England)	FW	Sam Baldock	1	0	0	0	0	0	1	0
10	(England)	MF	John Swift	1	0	0	0	0	0	1	0
11	(Ivory Coast)	FW	Yakou Méïté	1	0	0	0	0	0	1	0
14	(England)	MF	Ovie Ejaria	2	0	0	0	0	0	2	0
17	(Ghana)	DF	Andy Yiadom	1	0	0	0	0	0	1	0
18	(Portugal)	FW	Lucas João	3	0	0	0	0	0	3	0
28	(England)	MF	Josh Laurent	4	0	0	0	0	0	4	0
29	(England)	DF	Tom Holmes	4	0	0	0	0	0	4	0
30	(Guinea-Bissau)	MF	Alfa Semedo	4	0	0	0	0	0	4	0
33	(Brazil)	GK	Rafael Cabral	1	0	0	0	0	0	1	0
34	(Serbia)	MF	Dejan Tetek	1	0	0	0	0	0	1	0
46	(England)	MF	Jayden Onen	1	0	0	0	0	0	1	0
47	(Romania)	FW	George Pușcaș	1	0	0	0	0	0	1	0
Players away on loan:
Players who left Reading during the season:
Total				46	0	0	0	0	0	46	0

== Awards ==
=== Manager of the Month ===
Month	Name	Award
September	Veljko Paunović	Won

=== EA Sports Young Player of the Season ===
Month	Name	Award
Young Player of the Season	Michael Olise	Won

=== Sky Bet Championship Team of the Season ===
Position	Name	Award
Midfielder	Michael Olise	Won
