= Oliver Pendlebury =

English footballer (born 2002)

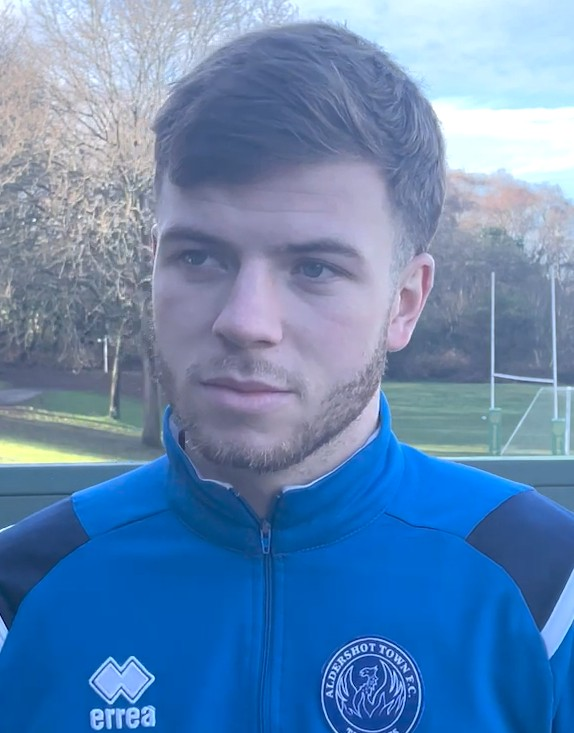
- Pendlebury in January 2023

Personal information
- Full name: Oliver Jack Pendlebury
- Date of birth: 19 January 2002 (age 24)
- Place of birth: Maidenhead, England
- Height: 5 ft 11 in (1.80 m)
- Position: Midfielder

Team information
- Current team: Sholing
- Number: 6

Youth career
- Marlow
- –2020: Reading

Senior career*
Years	Team	Apps	(Gls)
2020–2021	Reading	1	(0)
2021–2022	Wycombe Wanderers	9	(2)
2022	→ Woking (loan)	4	(0)
2022–2023	Farnborough	13	(3)
2023	Aldershot Town	17	(1)
2023	Ayr United	6	(2)
2023–2025	Farnborough	64	(10)
2025–2026	Havant & Waterlooville	53	(2)
2026–	Sholing	6	(0)

International career
- England U15
- England U16
- * Club domestic league appearances and goals as of 21:02, 3 September 2026 (UTC)

Oliver Jack Pendlebury (born 19 January 2002) is an English professional footballer who plays as a midfielder for Southern League Premier Division South club Sholing.

After playing youth football for Marlow and Reading, he made his senior debut for Reading in the FA Cup in January 2021. He was released by Reading at the end of the season and signed for EFL League One club Wycombe Wanderers. After a season at the club and a loan spell at Woking, he was released the following year. Following his release from Wycombe, Pendlebury joined Farnborough in September 2022. This spell ultimately proved to be brief with the midfielder joining Aldershot Town in January 2023 before a move to Scottish Championship side, Ayr United ahead of the 2023–24 campaign, but left Ayr in August 2023, citing 'personal reasons'. He returned to Farnborough later that month. Following two years back in Hampshire, Pendlebury made the move south to join Havant & Waterlooville in February 2025. In June 2026, Pendlebury agreed to join Sholing.

== Early life and education ==
Born in Maidenhead, Pendlebury attended Altwood Church of England School in Maidenhead.

== Club career ==
Having played youth football for Marlow before joining Reading's academy, he signed his first professional contract with Reading in January 2019. He was named in the starting line-up for his senior debut in an FA Cup third round tie with Luton Town on 9 January 2021, where Reading lost 1–0. On 11 May 2021, Reading announced that Pendlebury was one of their players being released by the club at the end of the 2020–21 season when their contract expired.

On 8 June 2021, EFL League One club Wycombe Wanderers announced that Pendlebury would sign for them on 1 July 2021, once his Reading contract had expired. He made his debut for the club in their opening match of the season against Accrington Stanley on 7 August 2021 with fellow midfielders Dominic Gape, Curtis Thompson and David Wheeler unavailable; Wycombe won 2–1 with manager Gareth Ainsworth stating that after the game that he is "not afraid in giving young kids their debuts" in response to Pendlebury's performance. He scored the first goals of his career the following week when he scored a second-half brace in a 3–1 win over Cheltenham Town. On 4 March 2022, Pendlebury joined National League side, Woking on loan for the remainder of the 2021–22 campaign. He went onto feature four times for the Cards before being recalled by his parent club a month later. He was released by Wycombe at the end of the season.

On 3 September 2022, Pendlebury joined National League South club Farnborough on a short-term deal. That same day he made his debut during a 1–0 victory over Cheshunt.

In January 2023, Pendlebury signed for National League club Aldershot Town on a deal until the end of the season.

On 24 June 2023, following his release from Aldershot, Pendlebury agreed to join Scottish Championship side, Ayr United with fellow team-mate, Francis Amartey. On 30 August 2023, he left the club after asking to be released from his contract for 'personal reasons'.

Later that month, he returned to Farnborough.

On 18 February 2025, Pendlebury joined Southern League Premier Division South side, Havant & Waterlooville on a deal until the end of the 2025–26 campaign.

On 12 June 2026, Pendlebury agreed to join fellow Southern League side, Sholing on a two-year deal.

== International career ==
He represented England at both under-15 level and under-16 level, captaining the latter.

== Career statistics ==
As of match played 31 August 2026

Appearances and goals by club, season and competition
Club	Season	League			National Cup		League Cup		Other		Total	
Club	Season	Division	Apps	Goals	Apps	Goals	Apps	Goals	Apps	Goals	Apps	Goals
Reading	2020–21	Championship	0	0	1	0	0	0	0	0	1	0
Wycombe Wanderers	2021–22	League One	4	2	0	0	2	0	3 (Note: Appearance in the EFL Trophy)	0	9	2
Woking (loan)	2021–22	National League	4	0	—		—		—		4	0
Farnborough	2022–23	National League South	13	2	2	1	—		2 (Note: Appearances in the FA Trophy)	0	17	3
Aldershot Town	2022–23	National League	17	1	—		—		—		17	1
Ayr United	2023–24	Scottish Championship	2	1	0	0	4	0	0	0	6	1
Farnborough	2023–24	National League South	38	8	3	0	—		1	0	42	8
Farnborough	2024–25	National League South	26	2	1	0	—		1	0	28	2
Farnborough	Total		64	10	4	0	—		2	0	70	10
Havant & Waterlooville	2024–25	Southern League Premier Division South	13	1	—		—		—		13	1
Havant & Waterlooville	2025–26	Southern League Premier Division South	40	1	1	0	—		2	0	43	1
Havant & Waterlooville	Total		53	2	1	0	—		2	0	56	2
Sholing	2026–27	Southern League Premier Division South	6	0	0	0	—		0	0	6	0
Career total			163	18	8	1	6	0	9	0	186	19
