= Tomás Esteves =

Portuguese footballer

Personal information
- Full name: Tomás do Lago Pontes Esteves
- Date of birth: 3 April 2002 (age 24)
- Place of birth: Arcos de Valdevez, Portugal
- Height: 1.80 m (5 ft 11 in)
- Position: Right-back

Team information
- Current team: Pisa

Youth career
- 2010–2011: ADECAS
- 2011–2019: Porto

Senior career*
Years	Team	Apps	(Gls)
2019–2023	Porto B	27	(0)
2019–2023	Porto	3	(0)
2020–2021	→ Reading (loan)	30	(1)
2022–2023	→ Pisa (loan)	23	(0)
2023–	Pisa	30	(1)
2026	→ Bari (loan)	15	(0)

International career^{‡}
2017	Portugal U15	5	(0)
2017–2018	Portugal U16	12	(0)
2018–2019	Portugal U17	12	(0)
2019	Portugal U19	5	(0)
2021	Portugal U20	2	(0)
2019–2024	Portugal U21	5	(0)
- * Club domestic league appearances and goals as of 12 May 2026 ‡ National team caps and goals as of 22:33, 21 December 2025 (UTC)

Tomás do Lago Pontes Esteves (born 3 April 2002) is a Portuguese professional footballer who plays as a right-back for Serie B club Pisa.

== Club career ==
Esteves was born in Arcos de Valdevez, Viana do Castelo District. He was part of the FC Porto squad that won the 2018–19 UEFA Youth League, defeating Chelsea 3–1 in the final in Nyon, Switzerland. With a contract lasting until 2021, he attracted interest from Manchester City who offered €10 million for his signature, and rejected a transfer to FC Barcelona in August 2019.

Ahead of the 2019–20 season, Esteves was given the number 2 shirt for the first team, inherited from the released Maxi Pereira. He made his senior debut on 18 August 2019 for FC Porto B, starting and playing 80 minutes in a 1–1 home draw against Varzim S.C. on the second week of the season.

Esteves had his initial call-up to a first-team matchday squad for the Taça da Liga opening group match against C.D. Santa Clara on 25 September 2019, remaining unused in the 1–0 home win. On 5 December he made his debut in the same competition, playing the last 15 minutes of a 3–0 win at Casa Pia A.C. in place of Wilson Manafá. He made his Primeira Liga bow on 16 June 2020, playing the first hour of a goalless draw at bottom club C.D. Aves before being substituted for Moussa Marega.

On 5 October 2020, Esteves was loaned to EFL Championship club Reading for the season. He made his debut fifteen days later in a 1–0 home win over Wycombe Wanderers, as a 57th-minute substitute for Tom Holmes. He scored his only goal for the Royals in a 2–2 draw with Swansea City on 25 April 2021.

On 2 August 2022, Esteves joined Pisa S.C. in Serie B on loan with an option to buy and a conditional obligation to buy. He made his debut 11 days later, starting as the season began with a 4–3 loss at A.S. Cittadella.

On 3 August 2023, Pisa announced the permanent signing of Esteves on a three-year contract, acquiring 70% of the player's economic rights for a reported €1 million fee.

On 25 January 2026, Esteves moved on loan to Bari in Serie B.

== International career ==
Esteves first represented Portugal at under-15 level in April 2017. On 5 September 2019, he made his debut for the under-21 team, replacing Thierry Correia at half time in a 5–0 home win over Gibraltar in Alverca in a Euro 2021 qualifier. At 17 years, 5 months and 3 days he became the youngest player for the team in the 21st century, beating fellow Porto graduate Rúben Neves by 25 days.

== Personal life ==
Esteves' younger brother Gonçalo, also a defender, spent a decade at Porto before joining Sporting CP in 2021.

== Career statistics ==
As of match played 6 May 2023

Club	Season	League			Cup (Note: Includes the Taça de Portugal, FA Cup and Coppa Italia)		League Cup (Note: Includes the Taça da Liga and EFL Cup)		Continental		Other		Total	
Club	Season	Division	Apps	Goals	Apps	Goals	Apps	Goals	Apps	Goals	Apps	Goals	Apps	Goals
Porto B	2019–20	LigaPro	10	0	—		—		—		—		10	0
Porto B	2021–22	Liga Portugal 2	17	0	—		—		—		—		17	0
Porto B	Total		27	0	—		—		—		—		27	0
Porto	2019–20	Primeira Liga	2	0	0	0	1	0	0	0	—		3	0
Reading (loan)	2020–21	Championship	29	1	1	0	0	0	—		—		30	1
Pisa (loan)	2022–23	Serie B	23	0	0	0	—		—		—		23	0
Career total			81	1	1	0	1	0	0	0	—		83	1

== Honours ==
Porto Youth

- UEFA Youth League: 2018–19

Porto

- Primeira Liga: 2019–20
