= 2022–23 Luton Town F.C. season =

English football club season

Luton Town
2022–23 season
- Owner: Luton Town Football Club 2020 Limited
- Chairman: David Wilkinson
- Manager: Nathan Jones (until 10 November); Rob Edwards (from 17 November)
- Stadium: Kenilworth Road
- Championship: 3rd
- Play-offs: Winners
- FA Cup: Fourth round
- EFL Cup: First round
- Top goalscorer: League: Carlton Morris (20); All: Carlton Morris (20)
- Highest home attendance: 10,072 vs Swansea City, 4 March 2023, Championship
- Lowest home attendance: 3,827 vs Newport County, 9 August 2022, EFL Cup
Home colours	Away colours	Third colours

The 2022–23 season was the 137th season of competitive football and fourth consecutive season in the Championship played by Luton Town Football Club, a professional association football club based in Luton, Bedfordshire, England. Luton also competed in the FA Cup and EFL Cup. The season covers the period from 1 July 2022 to 30 June 2023.

== Background and pre-season ==
Luton Town's pre-season programme began with an away friendly match against Hitchin Town before a week-long training camp in Slovenia, which included a friendly against Slovenian PrvaLiga club Bravo. After returning from Slovenia, Luton played a behind-closed-doors match against Gillingham at The Brache training ground, followed by friendlies away to Northampton Town and Peterborough United, and at home to West Ham United. An additional friendly was played against Arsenal on 21 December.

Pre-season match details
Date	Opponents	Venue	Result	Score F–A	Scorers	Attendance	Ref.
1 July 2022	Hitchin Town	A	W	3–0	Potts 26', Jerome 39', Woodrow 47'	2,213	
8 July 2022	Bravo	N	W	2–1	Pereira 91', Cornick 112'		
13 July 2022	Gillingham	H	W	2–1	Jerome (2) 21' pen., 29'	(Note: Match played behind closed doors)	
16 July 2022	Northampton Town	A	W	2–1	Adebayo 54', Potts 56'	2,386	
20 July 2022	Peterborough United	A	W	2–0	Woodrow 27', Cornick 82'		
23 July 2022	West Ham United	H	D	1–1	Bradley 90'	7,010	
21 December 2022	Arsenal	A	D	0–0		(Note: Match played behind closed doors)	

== EFL Championship ==
=== July–August ===
Luton began the season with a goalless draw at home to Birmingham City; new signings Ethan Horvath, Luke Freeman and Carlton Morris were all in the starting lineup, and Cauley Woodrow came on as a substitute to make his first appearance for the club in over a decade. The next match also resulted in a draw; Dan Potts scored the team's first league goal in a 1–1 draw away to Burnley.

=== Match results ===
EFL Championship match details
Date	League position	Opponents	Venue	Result	Score F–A	Scorers	Attendance	Ref.
30 July 2022	12th	Birmingham City	H	D	0–0		9,921	
6 August 2022	14th	Burnley	A	D	1–1	Potts 5'	19,628	
13 August 2022	20th	Preston North End	H	L	0–1		9,740	
16 August 2022	23rd	Bristol City	A	L	0–2		17,329	
20 August 2022	17th	Swansea City	A	W	2–0	Campbell 14', Morris 72'	16,323	
26 August 2022	17th	Sheffield United	H	D	1–1	Morris 10'	9,882	
30 August 2022	9th	Cardiff City	A	W	2–1	Freeman 47', Osho 62'	17,202	
3 September 2022	16th	Wigan Athletic	H	L	1–2	Morris 39'	9,885	
14 September 2022	18th	Coventry City	H	D	2–2	Morris (2) 4', 15'	9,546	
17 September 2022	11th	Blackburn Rovers	H	W	2–0	Morris 58', Burke 67'	9,839	
30 September 2022	5th	Hull City	A	W	2–0	Jones 6' o.g., Lansbury 44'	15,730	
4 October 2022	9th	Huddersfield Town	H	D	3–3	Adebayo (2) 18', 37', Clark 45+1'	9,073	
8 October 2022	9th	West Bromwich Albion	A	D	0–0		21,550	
15 October 2022	7th	Queens Park Rangers	H	W	3–1	Adebayo 18', Jerome 77', Freeman 90+2'	10,011	
18 October 2022	4th	Norwich City	A	W	1–0	Morris 62'	25,846	
23 October 2022	9th	Watford	A	L	0–4		19,282	
29 October 2022	9th	Sunderland	H	D	1–1	Morris 45+2'	10,060	
1 November 2022	10th	Reading	H	D	0–0		9,620	
5 November 2022	8th	Blackpool	A	W	1–0	Berry 57'	11,452	
8 November 2022	9th	Stoke City	A	L	0–2		18,095	
12 November 2022	10th	Rotherham United	H	D	1–1	Berry 90'	10,071	
10 December 2022	13th	Middlesbrough	A	L	1–2	Clark 33'	23,187	
26 December 2022	12th	Norwich City	H	W	2–1	Campbell 61', Woodrow 90'	9,831	
29 December 2022	7th	Queens Park Rangers	A	W	3–0	Morris (2) 10', 47', Doughty 81'	16,030	
1 January 2023	5th	Huddersfield Town	A	W	2–1	Bell 43', Burke 84'	18,333	
14 January 2023	9th	West Bromwich Albion	H	L	2–3	Morris 7', Adebayo 10'	10,069	
21 January 2023	7th	Wigan Athletic	A	W	2–0	Cornick 11', Adebayo 53'	11,125	
31 January 2023	4th	Cardiff City	H	W	1–0	Adebayo 88'	9,031	
4 February 2023	4th	Stoke City	H	W	1–0	Mpanzu 6'	10,031	
11 February 2023	4th	Coventry City	A	D	1–1	Lockyer 1'	20,366	
15 February 2023	4th	Preston North End	A	D	1–1	Morris 73'	13,903	
18 February 2023	4th	Burnley	H	L	0–1		10,066	
25 February 2023	6th	Birmingham City	A	W	1–0	Morris 47'	16,866	
28 February 2023	6th	Millwall	H	D	2–2	Adebayo 58', Berry 87'	10,060	
4 March 2023	5th	Swansea City	H	W	1–0	Morris 39'	10,072	
11 March 2023	4th	Sheffield United	A	W	1–0	Morris 53'	28,006	
15 March 2023	4th	Bristol City	H	W	1–0	Morris 4'	9,899	
18 March 2023	4th	Sunderland	A	D	1–1	Doughty 51'	37,579	
1 April 2023	4th	Watford	H	W	2–0	Osho 28', Campbell 90+1'	10,046	
7 April 2023	3rd	Millwall	A	D	0–0		18,422	
10 April 2023	3rd	Blackpool	H	W	3–1	Mpanzu (2) 45+2', 76', Morris 72'	9,772	
15 April 2023	3rd	Rotherham United	A	W	2–0	Morris 45', Woodrow 47'	11,009	
19 April 2023	3rd	Reading	A	D	1–1	Morris 80'	14,126	
24 April 2023	3rd	Middlesbrough	H	W	2–1	Lockyer 49', Morris 67' pen.	10,063	
1 May 2023	3rd	Blackburn Rovers	A	D	1–1	Lockyer 50'	17,261	
8 May 2023	3rd	Hull City	H	D	0–0		10,061	

==== League table ====
Pos	Team	Pld	W	D	L	GF	GA	GD	Pts	Promotion, qualification or relegation
1	Burnley (C, P)	46	29	14	3	87	35	+52	101	Promotion to Premier League
2	Sheffield United (P)	46	28	7	11	73	39	+34	91	Promotion to Premier League
3	Luton Town (O, P)	46	21	17	8	57	39	+18	80	Qualification for Championship play-offs
4	Middlesbrough	46	22	9	15	84	56	+28	75	Qualification for Championship play-offs
5	Coventry City	46	18	16	12	58	46	+12	70	Qualification for Championship play-offs
6	Sunderland	46	18	15	13	68	55	+13	69	Qualification for Championship play-offs

Source: EFL Official Website
Rules for classification: 1) Points; 2) Goal difference; 3) Number of goals scored; 4) Head-to-head results; 5) Wins; 6) Away goals; 7) Penalty points (sec 9.5); 8) 12-point sending off offences
(C) Champions; (O) Play-off winners; (P) Promoted

=== Play-offs ===
EFL Championship play-offs match details
Round	Date	Opponents	Venue	Result	Score F–A	Scorers	Attendance	Ref.
Semi-final first leg	13 May 2023	Sunderland	A	L	1–2	Adebayo 11'	46,060	
Semi-final second leg	16 May 2023	Sunderland	H	W	2–0; 3–2 agg.	Osho 10', Lockyer 43'	10,013	
Final	27 May 2023	Coventry City	N	W	1–1 a.e.t. 6–5 pens.	Clark 23'	85,711	

== FA Cup ==
The Hatters entered the competition in the third round and were drawn at home to Wigan Athletic and then to Grimsby Town in the fourth round.

FA Cup match details
Round	Date	Opponents	Venue	Result	Score F–A	Scorers	Attendance	Ref.
Third round	7 January 2023	Wigan Athletic	H	D	1–1	Cornick 45+1'	5,660	
Third round replay	17 January 2023	Wigan Athletic	A	W	2–1	Woodrow 51', Adebayo 90+8'	5,668	
Fourth round	28 January 2023	Grimsby Town	H	D	2–2	Adebayo 49' (pen.), Clark 66'	8,552	
Fourth round replay	7 February 2023	Grimsby Town	A	L	0–3		7,051	

== EFL Cup ==
Luton were drawn at home to League Two club Newport County in the first round.

EFL Cup match details
Round	Date	Opponents	Venue	Result	Score F–A	Scorers	Attendance	Ref.
First round	9 August 2022	Newport County	H	L	2–3	Mendes Gomes 30', Lockyer 50'	3,827	

== Transfers ==
=== In ===
Date	Player	Club†	Fee	Ref.
20 June 2022	Alfie Doughty	Stoke City	Undisclosed	
21 June 2022	Cauley Woodrow	Barnsley	Undisclosed	
22 June 2022	Matt Macey	Hibernian	Undisclosed	
1 July 2022	Louie Watson	(Derby County)	Undisclosed compensation	
4 July 2022	Luke Freeman	(Sheffield United)	Free	
6 July 2022	Carlton Morris	Barnsley	Undisclosed	
12 July 2022	Tobias Braney *	(Bowers & Pitsea)	Free	
12 July 2022	Daniel Idiakhoa *	(Newport Pagnell Town)	Free	
12 July 2022	Jayden Luker *	(Lambeth Tigers)	Free	
2 August 2022	John McAtee	Grimsby Town	Undisclosed	
2 August 2022	Aribim Pepple	Cavalry	Undisclosed	
30 January 2023	Jack Walton	Barnsley	Undisclosed	
31 January 2023	Joe Taylor	Peterborough United	Undisclosed	

† Brackets around club names indicate the player's contract with that club had expired before he joined Luton.
* Signed primarily for the development squad

=== Out ===
Date	Player	Club†	Fee	Ref.
26 January 2023	James Bree	Southampton	Undisclosed	
27 January 2023	Cameron Jerome	(Bolton Wanderers)	Mutual Consent	
31 January 2023	Harry Cornick	Bristol City	Undisclosed	
31 January 2023	Ed McJannet	Lecce	Undisclosed	

† Brackets around club names indicate the player joined that club after his Luton contract expired.

=== Loan in ===
Date	Player	Club	Return	Ref.
2 July 2022	Ethan Horvath	Nottingham Forest	End of Season	
26 January 2023	Cody Drameh	Leeds United	End of Season	
31 January 2023	Marvelous Nakamba	Aston Villa	End of Season	

=== Loan out ===
Date	Player	Club	Return	Ref.
9 July 2022	Josh Neufville	Sutton United	End of Season	
2 August 2022	John McAtee	Grimsby Town	End of Season	
8 August 2022	Aribim Pepple	Grimsby Town	12 January 2023 (Note: On 12 January, Pepple returned early from his loan at Grimsby)	
16 August 2022	Carlos Mendes Gomes	Fleetwood Town	End of Season	
1 September 2022	Admiral Muskwe	Fleetwood Town	31 January 2023 (Note: On 31 January, Muskwe was recalled from his loan at Fleetwood)	
1 September 2022	Dion Pereira	Bradford City	End of Season	
1 September 2022	Elliot Thorpe	Burton Albion	1 January 2023 (Note: On 1 January, Thorpe was recalled from his loan at Burton)	
7 November 2022	Tobias Braney	Chesham United	End of Season	
9 December 2022	Daniel Idiakhoa	Hitchin Town	End of Season (Note: On 11 January, Idiakhoa's loan at Hitchin was extended by a month. Then on 10 February the agreement was extended again by a further month. Again on March, 10 the loan was extended until the season end)	
23 December 2022	Avan Jones	Welling United	19 January 2023	
26 December 2022	Josh Allen	Cray Wanderers	19 January 2023	
26 December 2022	Tyrelle Newton	Cheshunt	End of Season	
13 January 2023	Josh Williams	Hemel Hempstead Town	10 March 2023 (Note: On 10 February, Williams' loan at Hemel Hempstead was extended by a further month)	
20 January 2023	Matt Macey	Portsmouth	End of Season	
26 January 2023	Callum Nicolson	Welwyn Garden City	End of Season	
27 January 2023	Josh Allen	Hitchin Town	End of Season	
30 January 2023	Harry Isted	Barnsley	End of Season	
31 January 2023	Glen Rea	Cheltenham Town	End of Season	
17 February 2023	Conor Lawless	Farnborough	17 March 2023	
23 February 2023	Oliver Hemlin	Kempston Rovers	23 March 2023	
24 March 2023	Aidan Francis-Clarke	St Albans City	End of Season	
24 March 2023	Avan Jones	Cheshunt	End of Season	
24 March 2023	Conor Lawless	Dulwich Hamlet	End of Season	
24 March 2023	Ben Tompkins	Bedford Town	End of Season	

== Appearances and goals ==
Numbers in parentheses denote appearances as substitute.
Players with names struck through and marked † left the club during the playing season.
Players with names in italics and marked * were on loan from another club for the whole of their season with Luton.
Players listed with no appearances have been in the matchday squad but only as unused substitutes.
Key to positions: GK – Goalkeeper; DF – Defender; MF – Midfielder; FW – Forward

Players included in matchday squads
No.	Pos.	Nat.	Name	League		FA Cup		EFL Cup		Total		Discipline	
No.	Pos.	Nat.	Name	Apps	Goals	Apps	Goals	Apps	Goals	Apps	Goals	A yellow rectangle, denoting the yellow penalty card shown to a player being cautioned	A red rectangle, denoting the red penalty card shown to a player being sent off
2	DF	ENG	~~James Bree~~ †	27	0	2	0	0	0	29	0	0	0
2	DF	ENG	Cody Drameh *	8	0	0	0	0	0	8	0	0	0
3	DF	ENG	Dan Potts	23	1	2	0	0	0	25	1	0	0
4	DF	WAL	Tom Lockyer	31	4	2 (1)	0	1	1	34 (1)	5	0	0
5	DF	ENG	Sonny Bradley	9 (4)	0	0	0	0	0	9 (4)	0	1	0
7	FW	ENG	~~Harry Cornick~~ †	7 (12)	1	2 (1)	1	0 (1)	0	9 (14)	2	0	0
8	MF	ENG	Luke Berry	2 (12)	3	1 (2)	0	1	0	4 (14)	3	0	0
9	FW	ENG	Carlton Morris	33 (3)	20	1 (2)	0	0 (1)	0	34 (6)	20	2	0
10	FW	ENG	Cauley Woodrow	3 (18)	2	3 (1)	1	1	0	7 (19)	3	0	0
11	FW	ENG	Elijah Adebayo	33 (2)	8	3 (1)	2	0	0	36 (3)	10	1	0
12	MF	ENG	Henri Lansbury	6 (3)	1	0	0	1	0	7 (3)	1	1	0
13	MF	ZIM	Marvelous Nakamba *	8 (1)	0	0	0	0	0	8 (1)	0	1	0
14	FW	ESP	Carlos Mendes Gomes	0	0	0	0	1	1	1	1	0	0
15	FW	ZIM	Admiral Muskwe	1 (1)	0	0	0	1	0	2 (1)	0	0	0
16	DF	ENG	Reece Burke	13 (4)	2	2	0	1	0	16 (4)	2	0	0
17	MF	DRC	Pelly Ruddock Mpanzu	18 (5)	3	1 (3)	0	0	0	19 (8)	3	0	0
18	MF	ENG	Jordan Clark	32 (3)	3	2 (1)	1	0	0	34 (2)	4	0	0
19	MF	ENG	Dion Pereira	0	0	0	0	1	0	1	0	0	0
20	MF	IRL	Louie Watson	2 (2)	0	3	0	1	0	6 (2)	0	0	0
21	GK	ENG	Harry Isted	1	0	0	0	0	0	1	0	0	0
22	MF	SCO	Allan Campbell	30 (3)	3	4	0	0	0	34 (3)	3	0	0
23	MF	NGA	Fred Onyedinma	5 (9)	0	1 (1)	0	0	0	6 (10)	0	1	0
25	FW	WAL	Joe Taylor	0 (2)	0	0	0	0	0	0 (2)	0	1	0
28	MF	WAL	Elliot Thorpe	0 (2)	0	1	0	0 (1)	0	1 (3)	0	0	0
29	DF	JAM	Amari'i Bell	35 (1)	1	4	0	0	0	39 (1)	1	0	0
30	MF	ENG	Luke Freeman	9 (11)	2	0	0	0	0	9 (11)	2	2	0
32	DF	ENG	Gabriel Osho	18 (5)	3	4	0	0 (1)	0	22 (6)	3	1	2
33	GK	ENG	Matt Macey	0	0	0	0	1	0	1	0	0	0
34	GK	USA	Ethan Horvath *	36	0	4	0	0	0	40	0	0	0
35	FW	ENG	~~Cameron Jerome~~ †	0 (21)	1	0 (2)	0	1	0	1 (23)	1	0	0
38	DF	WAL	Josh Williams	0	0	0	0	0 (1)	0	0 (1)	0	0	0
41	FW	ENG	Josh Allen	0	0	0	0	0	0	0	0	0	0
42	MF	ENG	Casey Pettit	0	0	0	0	0	0	0	0	0	0
43	MF	ENG	Zack Nelson	0	0	0	0	0	0	0	0	0	0
45	MF	ENG	Alfie Doughty	17 (3)	2	2 (2)	0	0	0	19 (5)	2	0	0

Players not included in matchday squads
No.	Pos.	Nat.	Name
1	GK	ENG	James Shea
6	MF	IRL	Glen Rea
