= Conor Lawless =

English footballer

Personal information
- Full name: Conor Michael John Lawless
- Date of birth: 13 September 2001 (age 25)
- Place of birth: Slough, England
- Height: 5 ft 8 in (1.73 m)
- Position: Midfielder

Team information
- Current team: Aldershot Town
- Number: 23

Youth career
- –2020: Reading

Senior career*
Years	Team	Apps	(Gls)
2020–2021	Reading	0	(0)
2021–2023	Luton Town	0	(0)
2023	→ Farnborough (loan)	5	(0)
2023	→ Dulwich Hamlet (loan)	7	(0)
2023–2026	Dagenham & Redbridge	61	(1)
2026–	Aldershot Town	0	(0)
- * Club domestic league appearances and goals as of 20:47, 23 June 2026 (UTC)

Conor Michael John Lawless (born 16 May 2001) is an English professional footballer who last played as a midfielder for English National League side Aldershot Twn.

== Career ==
Having come through Reading's academy, Lawless signed his first professional contract with the club in September 2018, and signed a contract extension in January 2020. He made his senior debut as a substitute in a 1–0 FA Cup defeat away to Luton Town on 9 January 2021. Lawless was released by the club in summer 2021 following the expiry of his contract.

On 21 September 2021, Luton Town announced the signing of Lawless.

On 17 February 2023, Lawless signed for National League South club Farnborough on a one-month loan deal. At the end of this spell, he joined Dulwich Hamlet until the end of the season.

On 31 July 2023, he signed for National League side Dagenham & Redbridge on a one-year deal after impressing during pre-season as a trialist.

On 20 June 2026, Lawless joined National League club Aldershot Town.

== Career statistics ==
As of match played 25 April 2026

Appearances and goals by club, season and competition
Club	Season	League			FA Cup		EFL Cup		Other		Total	
Club	Season	Division	Apps	Goals	Apps	Goals	Apps	Goals	Apps	Goals	Apps	Goals
Reading	2020–21	Championship	0	0	1	0	0	0	—		1	0
Luton Town	2022–23	Championship	0	0	0	0	0	0	0	0	0	0
Farnborough (loan)	2022–23	National League South	5	0	—		—		—		5	0
Dulwich Hamlet (loan)	2022–23	National League South	7	0	—		—		—		7	0
Dagenham & Redbridge	2023–24	National League	21	1	1	0	—		1 (Note: Appearance(s) in FA Trophy)	0	23	1
Dagenham & Redbridge	2024–25	National League	8	0	0	0	—		0	0	8	0
Dagenham & Redbridge	2025–26	National League South	32	0	1	0	—		3	1	36	1
Dagenham & Redbridge	Total		61	1	2	0	—		4	1	67	2
Career total			73	1	3	0	0	0	4	1	80	2
