= Adam Przybek =

Welsh footballer

Personal information
- Full name: Adam Józef Przybek
- Date of birth: 2 April 2000 (age 26)
- Place of birth: Nuneaton, England
- Height: 1.92 m (6 ft 4 in)
- Position: Goalkeeper

Team information
- Current team: Kirivong Sok Sen Chey
- Number: 1

Youth career
- 2007–2018: West Bromwich Albion

Senior career*
Years	Team	Apps	(Gls)
2018–2019	West Bromwich Albion	0	(0)
2018	→ Worcester City (loan)	5	(0)
2018	→ Gloucester City (loan)	5	(0)
2018–2019	→ Rushall Olympic (loan)	7	(0)
2019–2021	Ipswich Town	0	(0)
2020	→ Braintree Town (loan)	1	(0)
2020–2021	→ Concord Rangers (loan)	4	(0)
2021	→ Chesterfield (loan)	3	(0)
2021–2022	Wycombe Wanderers	0	(0)
2022	Walsall	0	(0)
2023	Stevenage	2	(0)
2023–2024	Stal Stalowa Wola	0	(0)
2024–2025	Penybont	42	(0)
2025–2026	Persib Bandung	1	(0)
2026–	Kirivong Sok Sen Chey	4	(0)

International career
2015	England U15	3	(0)
2015	England U16	1	(0)
2016	Wales U17	3	(0)
2016–2019	Wales U19	9	(0)
2019–2020	Wales U21	3	(0)
- * Club domestic league appearances and goals as of 9 November 2026

Adam Józef Przybek (born 2 April 2000) is a professional footballer who plays as a goalkeeper for Kirivong Sok Sen Chey. Born in England, he has represented Wales at youth level.

== Club career ==
=== West Bromwich Albion ===
Przybek began his career with West Bromwich Albion. He joined non-league side Worcester City on loan in March 2018 as cover, making 5 appearances. In October 2018, he joined Gloucester City on loan, making five league appearances before returning to West Brom. He spent a third loan spell away from the club making 7 appearances with Rushall Olympic.

=== Ipswich Town ===
After being released by West Brom in 2019, he signed for League One side Ipswich Town on a two-year contract. He made his professional debut for the side on 4 December 2019 in an EFL Trophy match against Peterborough United. The match ended in a 1–1 draw before Ipswich went on to win a penalty shootout during which Przybek saved two penalties.

Przybek joined Braintree Town on a month long youth loan in October 2020.

On 4 December 2020, Przybek joined Concord Rangers on loan until 3 January 2021.

On 21 January 2021, Przybek joined National League side Chesterfield on loan until the end of the season.

In April 2021, Ipswich announced that Przybek would be released at the end of the 2020–21 season following the end of his contract.

=== Wycombe Wanderers ===
He moved to Wycombe Wanderers in July 2021 but was released by the club in May 2022.

=== Walsall ===
On 21 June 2022, Przybek joined League Two side Walsall on a free transfer, signing a one-year deal. He made his Walsall debut on 30 August 2022 in the EFL Trophy 1–0 defeat to West Ham united Under-21s. Przybek's Walsall contract was cancelled by mutual agreement on 2 November 2022. He made his Stevenage debut on 15 February 2023 as a half-time substitute in the League Two 2–2 draw against Newport County.

=== Stevenage ===
Przybek joined Stevenage on 6 February 2023.

=== Stal Stalowa Wola ===
On 12 July 2023, Przybek moved to his father's home country to join Polish II liga side Stal Stalowa Wola. He made two cup appearances before leaving the club on 19 January 2024.

=== Persib Bandung ===
On 30 June 2025, Przybek joined Indonesia Super League side Persib Bandung. He made his Super League debut in matchweek 7 on 27 September 2025, starting in an away defeat against Persita Tangerang at the Indomilk Arena, Tangerang.

=== Kirivong Sok Sen Chey ===
On 5 August 2026, Przybek joined Cambodian Premier League side Kirivong Sok Sen Chey.

== International career ==
Born in England, Przybek has represented both England and Wales at international level. Przybek played for England and Wales at under-15 and under-16 level before switching allegiance to Wales. He played for the Wales under-19 side in 2016 and the under-20 side from 2016 to 2019.

He received his first call up to the Wales U21 squad in August 2019 for European Championship qualifiers. He made his debut for the Wales U21 side on 11 October 2019, starting in a 1–2 loss to Moldova U21 in a 2021 UEFA European Under-21 Championship qualifier.

== Personal life ==
Przybek is of Polish descent through his father, and Welsh descent through his maternal grandfather.

== Career statistics ==
As of match played 27 September 2025

Appearances and goals by club, season and competition
Club	Season	League			National Cup		League Cup		Other		Total	
Club	Season	Division	Apps	Goals	Apps	Goals	Apps	Goals	Apps	Goals	Apps	Goals
Ipswich Town	2019–20	League One	0	0	0	0	0	0	1 (Note: Appearance(s) in EFL Trophy)	0	1	0
Ipswich Town	2020–21	League One	0	0	0	0	0	0	0	0	0	0
Braintree Town (loan)	2020–21	National League South	1	0	2 (Note: Appearance(s) in FA Cup)	0	—		0	0	3	0
Concord Rangers (loan)	2020–21	National League South	4	0	0	0	—		1	0	5	0
Chesterfield (loan)	2020–21	National League	3	0	0	0	—		0	0	3	0
Wycombe Wanderers	2021–22	League One	0	0	1	0	1 (Note: Appearance in EFL Cup)	0	3	0	5	0
Walsall	2022–23	League Two	0	0	0	0	0	0	1	0	1	0
Stevenage	2022–23	League Two	2	0	0	0	0	0	0	0	2	0
Stal Stalowa Wola	2023–24	II liga	0	0	2	0	—		—		2	0
Penybont	2023–24	Cymru Premier	11	0	—		—		—		11	0
Penybont	2024–25	Cymru Premier	31	0	1	0	1	0	0	0	31	0
Persib Bandung	2025–26	Super League	1	0	–		0	0	0	0	1	0
Kirivong Soksen Chay	2026-27	Cambodian premier League	3	0	0	0	0	0	0	0	3	0
Career total			56	0	6	0	2	0	6	0	68	0

== Honours ==
Stevenage

- EFL League Two runner-up: 2022–23

Persib Bandung

- Super League: 2025–26
