= Omri Luzon =

Israeli footballer (born 1999)

Personal information
- Date of birth: 7 January 1999 (age 27)
- Place of birth: Petah Tikva, Israel
- Position: Centre back

Team information
- Current team: Hapoel Rishon LeZion
- Number: 22

Youth career
- –2017: Maccabi Petah Tikva

Senior career*
Years	Team	Apps	(Gls)
2017–2018	Maccabi Petah Tikva	2	(0)
2018	→ Hapoel Hadera (loan)	0	(0)
2018–2019	Hapoel Nof HaGalil	5	(0)
2019	Hapoel Ashkelon	13	(0)
2019–2020	Hapoel Rishon LeZion	33	(0)
2020	Maccabi Petah Tikva	0	(0)
2020–2021	Reading	0	(0)
2021–2023	Hapoel Rishon LeZion	54	(0)
2023–2024	Hapoel Umm al-Fahm	33	(1)
2024–2025	Bnei Yehuda	14	(0)
2025–2026	Maccabi Petah Tikva	1	(0)
2026–	Hapoel Rishon LeZion	9	(0)

International career
2015	Israel U16	4	(0)
2015–2016	Israel U17	10	(0)
2016–2017	Israel U18	7	(0)
2017	Israel U19	6	(0)
2019–2021	Israel U21	2	(0)
- * Club domestic league appearances and goals as of 24 June 2026

Omri Luzon (Hebrew: עמרי לוזון; born 7 January 1999) is an Israeli professional footballer who plays as a centre back for Hapoel Rishon LeZion. He has represented Israel at youth international level.

== Club career ==
Luzon began his career at Maccabi Petah Tikva, making his professional debut in the Israeli Premier League in May 2017 as a substitute in a 0–0 draw with Maccabi Haifa. In September 2020, it was reported that Luzon was training with Championship side Reading ahead of signing a three-year deal with the club. On 30 October 2020, despite no official announcement from the club, he made his debut for Reading U23s in a Premier League 2 match. On 15 December 2020, it was officially announced that Luzon had joined Reading on a contract until June 2021.

== International career ==
Luzon has represented Israel up to under-21 level.

== Career statistics ==
As of 1 June 2023

Appearances and goals by club, season and competition
Club	Season	League			Cup		League Cup		Other		Total	
Club	Season	Division	Apps	Goals	Apps	Goals	Apps	Goals	Apps	Goals	Apps	Goals
Maccabi Petah Tikva	2016–17	Israeli Premier League	1	0	0	0	0	0	0	0	1	0
Maccabi Petah Tikva	2017–18	Israeli Premier League	1	0	0	0	0	0	0	0	1	0
Hapoel Hadera	2018–19	Israeli Premier League	0	0	2	0	0	0	0	0	2	0
Hapoel Nof HaGalil	2018–19	Liga Leumit	5	0	0	0	0	0	0	0	5	0
Hapoel Ashkelon	2018–19	Liga Leumit	13	0	0	0	0	0	0	0	13	0
Hapoel Rishon LeZion	2019–20	Liga Leumit	33	0	0	0	1	0	0	0	34	0
Maccabi Petah Tikva	2020–21	Israeli Premier League	0	0	4	0	0	0	0	0	4	0
Hapoel Rishon LeZion	2021–22	Liga Leumit	28	0	1	0	0	0	0	0	29	0
Hapoel Rishon LeZion	2021–22	Liga Leumit	26	0	2	0	3	0	0	0	31	0
Hapoel Umm al-Fahm	2021–22	Liga Leumit	0	0	0	0	0	0	0	0	0	0
Career total			108	0	9	0	4	0	0	0	121	0
