= James Clark (footballer, born 2001) =

English footballer

Personal information
- Date of birth: 5 September 2001 (age 25)
- Place of birth: London, England
- Position: Full back

Team information
- Current team: Beaconsfield Town

Youth career
- Queens Park Rangers
- Brentford
- Leatherhead
- 2017–2020: Chelsea
- 2020–2021: Wycombe Wanderers

Senior career*
Years	Team	Apps	(Gls)
2021–2022	Wycombe Wanderers	0	(0)
2021–2022	→ Beaconsfield Town (loan)		
2022–	Beaconsfield Town		
- * Club domestic league appearances and goals as of 11:44, 6 March 2022 (UTC)

James Clark (born 5 September 2001) is an English professional footballer who plays as a full back for Beaconsfield Town.

== Career ==
Clark began his career at Queens Park Rangers at the age of 9, later moving to Brentford at the age of 12 before playing with Leatherhead and Chelsea. He left Chelsea in the summer of 2020, signing with Wycombe Wanderers in November 2020 following a trial on a contract until the end of the 2020–21 season. On 12 May 2021 it was announced that his contract would be extended for a further 6 months. On 26 November 2021, Clark joined Southern League Premier Division South side Beaconsfield Town on loan until 3 January 2022. On 5 January 2022, Clark left Wycombe Wanderers following the expiration of his contract.

On 17 January 2022, Clark returned to Beaconsfield Town on a permanent basis.
