= Leather (disambiguation) =

Leather is a material created through the tanning of hides and skins of animals.

Leather or Leathers may also refer to:

== People ==
- Leather (surname)
- Leather (comics), a character from DC Comics
- Leather Tuscadero, a character from the television sitcom Happy Days
- Catherine Anne Leone, metal vocalist known professionally as Leather Leone
- Leathers (surname)

== Music ==
- Leather (album), an album by Cody Johnson
- "Leathers" (Deftones song), a song by Deftones from Koi No Yokan
- Läther (pronounced "leather"), a Frank Zappa album
- "Leather", a song by Tori Amos from Little Earthquakes

== Sports ==
- Various types of balls made of leather:
  - Cricket ball
  - Ball (gridiron football)
  - Baseball (ball)

== Other uses ==
- Leather subculture
- Motorcycle leathers, protective one- or two-piece suits worn by motorcyclists, mainly for protection in a crash
- Fruit leather, a type of food with a leather-like texture
- Leathers and Associates, playground designer

== See also ==
- Lather (disambiguation)
- Leithers, people from Leith
