= Leathers (surname) =

Leathers is a surname. Notable people with the surname include:

- Adam Leathers (born 2001), English professional footballer
- Becka Leathers (born 1996), American wrestler
- Blanche Douglass Leathers (1860–1940), American steamboat pilot
- Craig Leathers (fl. 1995), American television director and producer
- Frederick Leathers, 1st Viscount Leathers (1883–1965), British industrialist and public servant
- Gloria Leathers, 1989 murder victim of Wanda Jean Allen
- Hal Leathers (1898–1977), American baseball player
- Ida Barlow (née Leathers), fictional character of Coronation Street
- John B. Leathers (died 1880), American politician from North Carolina
- Jonathan Leathers (born 1985), American soccer player
- Lawrence Leathers (1981–2019), American jazz drummer
- Marion Kuntz (née Leathers) (1924–2010), American historian and writer
- Milton Leathers (1908–2000), American football player

== See also ==
- Leather (surname)
- Leithers, people from Leith
