= Red Wine (2013 film) =

- Theatrical release poster
- Directed by: Salam Bappu
- Screenplay by: Mammen K. Rajan
- Produced by: A. S. Gireesh Lal
- Starring: Mohanlal; Meghana Raj; Fahadh Faasil; Asif Ali
- Cinematography: Manoj Pillai
- Edited by: Ranjan Abraham
- Music by: Bijibal
- Production company: Gowri Meenakshi Movies
- Distributed by: Reelax Eveents; Tricolor Entertainments
- Release date: 21 March 2013
- Running time: 146 minutes
- Country: India
- Language: Malayalam

Red Wine is a 2013 Indian Malayalam-language thriller film directed by Salam Bappu (in his directorial debut) and written by Mammen K. Rajan from a story by Noufal Blathoor. It stars Mohanlal, Meghana Raj and Fahad Faasil as leads alongside Asif Ali. The film's soundtrack and background score were composed by Bijibal. Red Wine was released on 21 March 2013. The film was later dubbed into Telugu under the same title.

== Plot ==
ACP Ratheesh Vasudevan, a brilliant and experienced police officer, is appointed to investigate the murder of Anoop C V, a part-time theatre actor who performed at local stage plays. He is assisted by SI Rafi.

During the initial stages of the investigation, Ratheesh learns from Anoop's family members, friends, acquaintances, neighbours and from Anoop's close friend Joe Sebastian that Anoop was a brilliant student both in school and in the engineering college and also that he was the Local Committee Secretary of The Communist Party and was interested in social service and also helping the local population rather than using his engineering degree to get a well-paying job abroad. Joe Sebastian is running a catering service and is also a quarry owner. KP Ramesh Kumar is a young man who is employed in a private firm and he is in debt. Ramesh has a wife Deepthi and a newborn child and he is struggling to make ends meet. Navas Paramban is a friend of Anoop who owns an advertisement company.

Narayanan is a man who is Anoop's close friend and mentor, who had known Anoop right from his childhood since Narayanan had enrolled Anoop in school when Anoop was a kid and who influenced him to read a lot. During the investigation and through various people he met, Ratheesh comes across a suspicious private bank CAPITAL FINCORP which was situated in the heart of the city. Later he gets to know more about the bank from Navas and also from Abhilash who is a clerk at the bank. One day, before leaving the village to set off for a short journey, Narayanettan comes to meet Ratheesh at his office and tells more about Anoop and also the things he did for the welfare and betterment of the common people. Narayanan also told that a few days before Anoop's death, Anoop had filed a petition along with the tribals in Wayanad to the RDO about a land encroachment attempt by the private bank, which could result in the life of tribals being evicted from there. The bankers had planned to construct an ayurvedic resort in that area. Naryanan doubted whether Anoop's murder was a political murder. Later, Ratheesh meets the RDO Ann Mary and inquires about the whereabouts of the petition. She replied that she had forwarded it to the Land Acquisition section head Rathnakaran Pillai for immediate action after knowing the seriousness of the situation. She also said that Rathnakaran was on sick leave for many days and that the files were with him. Later, Ratheesh finds out that Pillai was corrupt and had given the files to the credit card manager of CAPITAL FINCORP. Pillai is eventually arrested from his flat by Ratheesh and his team. Later one day during a casual talk with Ann Mary at her home, she revealed to Ratheesh that Anoop was her Facebook friend and also revealed that Anoop was in love with his fiancé Jasmine. On further investigation, Ratheesh finds out that Ramesh is a suspect in the crime after Abhilash gives Ramesh's non-liability certificate from the bank to Ratheesh which showed that he had closed his loan quickly. Later, lookout notices for Ramesh were put up around the main cities.

After gathering clear and concrete evidence, Ratheesh formally arrests the bank manager Venugopal, the regional head Philipose Koshy and their henchman Shibumon. On questioning them, they admit and confess their crimes that they were behind it and also that Ramesh was the murderer as they made Ramesh to commit the crime in order to close his loan which he was unable to pay. The commissioner asks Ratheesh to speed up the investigation since it was an unusual murder case and that he is having a lot of pressure from the top brasses in the police department. On questioning Philipose and Venu again, Ratheesh finds out that Dr Paul Alexander, who is a rich businessman is also involved in the act under the pretext of a charitable trust named Karunya Charitable Trust. Ratheesh later arrests Paul from the Baby Memorial Hospital at Calicut where he was undergoing treatment.

Ratheesh and his police team had properly planned to nab Ramesh to produce him in the court along with the other culprits the next day. That night, Ramesh reached his residence. Then quickly the police team led by SI Rafi who were hiding nearby jumped out from nowhere and began chasing him. While running from the police, Ramesh gets hit by a passing truck, thrown onto a passing car and dies on the spot. Finally, Ratheesh goes to the mortuary to see Ramesh's corpse. While coming out of the mortuary, he find's Deepthi and their infant sitting inside an autorickshaw. The movie ends as Ratheesh leaves in his jeep, speechless with a heavy heart. In the final credits scene, Ratheesh is seen spending his time at a lonely seashore.

In a deleted climax scene, it was shown that the souls of Anoop and Ramesh appear to Ratheesh at the beach to speak to him, where both the souls thanked him for finding out the real truth and also for knowing about how both of their lives came to a drastic end. Anoop's soul also tells him that there is neither friend nor foe in the eyes of death.

== Cast ==
- Mohanlal as ACP Ratheesh Vasudevan IPS, Kozhikode City Police, the investigating officer
- Meghana Raj as RDO Ann Mary
- Fahadh Faasil as Comrade C.V. Anoop, LC Secretary
- Asif Ali as K.P. Ramesh Kumar
- Saiju Kurup as Navas Paramban
- Sudheer Karamana as CI Rafi, the officer who assists Ratheesh in the investigation
- Krishna Shankar as Subair, a medical student
- Jayaprakash as Dr.Paul Alexander
- Miya as Deepthi
- Anusree as Sreelakshmi
- Maria John as Jasmin
- Meera Nandan as Jasna
- Suraj Venjaramoodu as Joe Sebastian
- T. G. Ravi as Narayanan aka Narayanettan
- Priyanandanan as Unni
- Sunil Sukhada as Rethnakaran Pillai, Revenue Superintendent
- Jayakrishnan as Venugopal S, Credit Card Manager of CAPITAL FINCORP
- Satheesh Menon as Philipose Koshy, Regional Head of CAPITAL FINCORP
- Roshan Basheer as Alfy, a singer and musician
- Kailash as Fasaluddeen, CyberCell officer
- Murali as Sakhavu Joseph (Photo Appearance)
- Ambika Mohan as Elsey
- Sreejith as Raghu
- Anoop Chandran as Abhilash
- Irshad as Bhaskaran
- Nandan Unni as Kunjikannan
- Sundara Pandian as Shibu Mon
- Shivaji Guruvayoor as Commissioner George Joseph IPS, Kozhikode City Police
- Chithara Bhanu as Chandran
- Favour Francis as Father
- Moideen Koya as Principal Hamsa
- Gabriella Demetriades (Special appearance in the promotional song "Neelaakaasham")

== Production ==
The film was shot on locations in Kozhikode and Wayanad. The film began its shoot and held its pooja on 30 November 2012.

The film's first teaser was released on 22 December 2012, and a theatrical trailer was released on 5 March 2013. A promotional song was released on 18 March 2013.

== Release and reception ==
Red Wine received mixed to positive reviews from film critics.

- Aswin of The Times of India says that "Red Wine makes it too easy, too effortless and the thin element of suspense wanes no sooner than it even appears".
- Sify.com rated the film as "above Average", stating that "Red Wine is not bad, but it is not great either. If you are not looking forward to some modern pattern, the film may be a fine option as well".
- Paresh of Rediff.com says that "Red Wine is worth watching for its approach and its lead actors".
- Nirmal of One India says that "Red Wine is an interesting film by the 'super combo' of Mohanlal, Fahad Fazal and Asif Ali, a routine murder mystery, but a watchable one".
- Indiaglitz.com says that "Red Wine is a clean bit of film which can definitely be prescribed for families. One time watch for others though it is quite predictable to the core".

== Soundtrack ==
Red Wine

Soundtrack album by Bijibal Santhosh Narayanan
- Released: 7 March 2013
- Recorded: 2012
- Genre: Film soundtrack
- Length: 12:32
- Language: Malayalam
- Label: Mathrubhumi Music
- Producer: A. S. Gireesh Lal

Bijibal Santhosh Narayanan chronology
Da Thadiya (2012)	Red Wine (2013)	Thank You (2013)

The film's soundtrack and background score were composed by Bijibal, with lyrics penned by Rafeeq Ahammed and Santhosh Varma. The album was launched on 7 March 2013 at Crown Plaza in Kochi. The event was attended by Mohanlal, Asif Ali, Saiju Kurup, Meera Nandan, Miya, Anusree, Maria John and other personalities from the film industry, along with the technical crew and cast of the film. The audio rights were acquired by Mathrubhumi Music.

Track list
No.	Title	Lyrics	Singer(s)	Length
1.	"Ilam Veyil"	Santhosh Varma	Najim Arshad, Veetraag, Prashanth	4:49
2.	"Neelaakaasham"	Santhosh Varma	Aditi Gopinathan	3:25
3.	"Akaluvathenthino"	Rafeeq Ahammed	Job Kurian	4:20
Total length:				12:32
