= Leathercoat =

Leathercoat may refer to:

- leather coat, a coat made of leather
- leathercoat (apple), a type of Russet apple
- leathercoat (fish), Oligoplites saurus inornatus; see List of least concern perciform fishes
- "Leather Coat" (song), a 2023 Don Toliver song off the album Love Sick
- Leathercoat Point, St Margaret's at Cliffe, England, UK; a point separating the English Channel from the North Sea

== See also ==
- buff leather coat, a type of coat
- "Long Leather Coat" (song), a 1993 song by Paul McCartney off the album Off the Ground
- Leather (disambiguation)
- Coat (disambiguation)
