= 2022–23 Wycombe Wanderers F.C. season =

Wycombe Wanderers FC
2022–23 season
- Owner: Feliciana EFL Ltd. (75%); Wycombe Wanderers Trust (25%)
- Chairman: Rob Couhig
- Manager: Gareth Ainsworth (until 21 February); Matt Bloomfield (from 21 February)
- Stadium: Adams Park
- League One: 9th
- FA Cup: First round
- EFL Cup: Second round
- EFL Trophy: Group stage
- Top goalscorer: League: Anis Mehmeti; Lewis Wing (9 each); All: Anis Mehmeti; Lewis Wing (9 each)
- Highest home attendance: 8,302 vs. Sheffield Wednesday; 14 January 2023
- Lowest home attendance: 567 vs. Peterborough United; 18 October 2022
- Average home league attendance: 5,846
- Biggest win: 3–0 (Quadrice) (vs. Burton Albion, 30 July 2022) (vs. Barnsley, 20 August 2022) (vs. Peterborough United, 1 January 2023) (vs. Port Vale, 4 February 2023)
- Biggest defeat: 4-0 (vs. Ipswich Town, 7 April 2023)
Home colours	Away colours	Third colours

The 2022–23 season was the 136th season in the existence of Wycombe Wanderers Football Club and the club's second consecutive season in League One. In addition to the league, they also competed in the 2022–23 FA Cup, the 2022–23 EFL Cup and the 2022–23 EFL Trophy.

== Transfers ==
=== In ===
Date	Pos	Player	Transferred from	Fee	Source
1 July 2022	AM	(England) Jasper Pattenden	(England) Worthing	Undisclosed	
1 July 2022	CM	(England) Jack Young	(England) Newcastle United U23s	Undisclosed	
4 July 2022	CF	(England) D'Mani Mellor	(England) Manchester United U23s	Free transfer	
12 July 2022	AM	(England) Christie Ward	(England) Brockenhurst	Undisclosed	
25 July 2022	GK	(England) Josh Blunkell	(England) AFC Sudbury	Undisclosed	
11 August 2022	CB	(England) Alfie Mawson	(England) Fulham	Free transfer	
15 August 2022	CF	(England) Arnold Matshazi	(England) Blackpool U18s	Free Transfer	
15 August 2022	CM	(England) Luca Woodhouse	(England) Tonbridge Angels	Undisclosed	
18 August 2022	RW	(England) Charles Hagan	(England) Sheffield Wednesday U21s	Free transfer	
18 August 2022	GK	(Poland) Max Stryjek	(Scotland) Livingston	Performance related	
30 August 2022	CB	(England) Ben Kaninda	(England) Shrewsbury Town U18s	Free transfer	
30 August 2022	RB	(England) Antoine Makoli	Free agent	Free transfer	
3 February 2023	CB	(England) Declan Skura	(England) Kingstonian	Free transfer	
11 February 2023	CB	(England) Jordan Willis	Free agent	Free transfer	

=== Out ===
Date	Pos	Player	Transferred to	Fee	Ref
30 June 2022	CF	(England) Adebayo Akinfenwa	Retired		
30 June 2022	CB	(Saint Kitts and Nevis) Andre Burley	(England) Oxford City	Released	
30 June 2022	CM	(France) Jean-Baptiste Fischer	(England) Oxford City	Released	
30 June 2022	CF	(England) Malachi Linton	(England) Yeovil Town	Released	
30 June 2022	DM	(England) Oliver Pendlebury	(England) Farnborough	Released	
30 June 2022	GK	(Wales) Adam Przybek	(England) Walsall	Released	
30 June 2022	CB	(England) Max Ram	(Scotland) Inverness Caledonian Thistle	Released	
30 June 2022	CB	(England) Anthony Stewart	(Scotland) Aberdeen	Contract Expiration	
30 June 2022	GK	(England) David Stockdale	(England) Sheffield Wednesday	Contract Expiration	
23 December 2022	LW	(England) Connor Parsons	(Republic of Ireland) Waterford	Undisclosed	
12 January 2023	CF	(Iraq) Ali Al-Hamadi	(England) AFC Wimbledon	Undisclosed	
26 January 2023	LW	(Sierra Leone) Sullay Kaikai	(England) Milton Keynes Dons	Mutual consent	
31 January 2023	AM	(Albania) Anis Mehmeti	(England) Bristol City	Undisclosed	
14 February 2023	CB	(England) Alfie Mawson	Retired		

=== Loans in ===
Date	Pos	Player	Loaned from	On loan until	Source
26 January 2023	GK	(England) Harvey Cartwright	(England) Hull City	30 June 2023	
30 January 2023	CF	(Wales) Chem Campbell	(England) Wolverhampton Wanderers	30 June 2023	

=== Loans out ===
Date	Pos	Player	Loaned to	On loan until	Source
17 August 2022	LW	(England) Connor Parsons	(England) Solihull Moors	23 December 2023	(Note: Parsons' loan period was initially until January 2023. This was ended early by mutual consent.)
29 August 2022	GK	(England) Josh Blunkell	(England) AFC Sudbury	8 October 2022	(Note: Blunkell's loan period was initially until 26 September 2022. This was extended until 27 October 2022, however he was recalled by Wycombe Wanderers due to Tyla Dickinson's loan move to Hungerford Town.)
8 October 2022	GK	(England) Tyla Dickinson	(England) Hungerford Town	5 November 2022	
14 October 2022	CF	(England) Arnold Matshazi	(England) Slough Town	January 2023	(Note: Matshazi's loan period was initially for a month until November 2022. This was extended until January 2023.)
4 November 2022	RB	(England) Antoine Makoli	(England) Chesham United	Short term	
11 November 2022	AM	(England) Christie Ward	(England) Hungerford Town	Unspecified	(Note: Ward's loan period was initially for a month until December 2022. This was extended for an undetermined period.)
15 November 2022	AM	(England) Jasper Pattenden	(England) Dorking Wanderers	3 January 2023	
18 November 2022	DM	(England) Adam Leathers	(England) Hampton & Richmond Borough	22 January 2023	(Note: Leathers' loan period was initially for a month until 16 December 2022. This was extended until 22 January 2023.)
19 November 2022	GK	(England) Josh Blunkell	(England) Bowers & Pitsea	Unspecified	
2 December 2022	CM	(England) Luca Woodhouse	(England) Slough Town	28 January 2023	(Note: Woodhouse's loan period was initially until 1 January 2023. This was extended until 28 January 2023.)
15 December 2022	CB	(England) Ben Kaninda	(England) Hanwell Town	5 January 2023	
5 January 2023	RW	(Republic of Ireland) Daryl Horgan	(England) Stevenage	30 June 2023	
13 January 2023	CB	(England) Ben Kaninda	(England) Hednesford Town	Unspecified	(Note: Kaninda's loan period was initially until 13 February 2023. This was extended until 11 March 2023.)
27 January 2023	CF	(England) D'Mani Mellor	(England) Rochdale	30 June 2023	
31 January 2023	GK	(England) Tyla Dickinson	(England) Sutton United	30 June 2023	
31 January 2023	DM	(England) Adam Leathers	(England) Maidenhead United	30 June 2023	
3 February 2023	CF	(England) Arnold Matshazi	(England) Hemel Hempstead Town	3 March 2023	
24 March 2023	RB	(England) Antoine Makoli	(England) Beaconsfield Town	30 June 2023	

== Pre-season and friendlies ==
Win Draw Loss Fixtures

On 24 June, Wycombe announced three behind-closed-doors practise matches against Fulham U23s, Oxford City and Watford. Along with four XI friendlies against Bracknell Town, Aylesbury United, Chesham United and Worthing. 2 Days later, Wycombe announced a Friendly against Premier League side AFC Bournemouth at Brockenhurst FC.

8 July 2022 Friendly	Bracknell Town	2–0	Wycombe Wanderers XI	Sandhurst
19:30 BST				Stadium: Bottom Meadow, Sandhurst

9 July 2022 Friendly	Wycombe Wanderers	3–0	Fulham U23s	Marlow
12:00 BST	Scowen; Vokes; Horgan	Report		Stadium: Marlow Road Training Ground; Attendance: 0 (behind-closed-doors)

12 July 2022 Friendly	Wycombe Wanderers	0–0	Oxford City	Marlow
18:00 BST		Report		Stadium: Marlow Road Training Ground; Attendance: 0 (behind-closed-doors)

16 July 2022 Friendly	Watford	4–1	Wycombe Wanderers	St Albans
11:00 BST	Sarr 2' (pen.), 50'; Dennis 52'; Asprilla 90'	Report	Tafazolli 67'	Stadium: Watford Football Club Training Ground; Attendance: 0 (behind-closed-doors)

22 July 2022 Friendly	AFC Bournemouth	0–2	Wycombe Wanderers	Brockenhurst
19:45 BST		Report	Hanlan; Al-Hamadi (pen.)	Stadium: Grigg Lane, Brockenhurst

22 July 2022 Friendly	Aylesbury United	1–1	Wycombe Wanderers XI	Chesham
19:30 BST				Stadium: The Meadow, Chesham

23 July 2022 Friendly	Southampton B	1–3	Wycombe Wanderers XI	Marchwood
15:00 BST	Small	Report	Jacobson (pen.); McCleary; Tafazolli	Stadium: Staplewood Training Ground

29 July 2022 Friendly	Chesham United	4–2	Wycombe Wanderers XI	Chesham
19:30 BST				Stadium: The Meadow, Chesham

2 August 2022 Friendly	Worthing	5–1	Wycombe Wanderers XI	Worthing
19:45 BST			Al-Hamadi	Stadium: Woodside Road, Worthing

5 September 2022 Friendly	Wycombe Wanderers XI	1–1	Southend United XI	High Wycombe
13:00 BST	Matshazi 79'	Report	Coker 60'	Stadium: Adams Park; Attendance: Behind Closed Doors

26 September 2022 Friendly	Wycombe Wanderers XI	2–1	Norwich City U21s	High Wycombe
13:00 BST	Al-Hamadi (pen.), 82'	Report	Goal	Stadium: Adams Park; Attendance: Behind Closed Doors

10 October 2022 Friendly	Wycombe Wanderers XI	1–2	Maidenhead United	High Wycombe
12:00 BST	Wakely	Report	Clifton (pen.); McCoulsky	Stadium: Adams Park; Attendance: Behind Closed Doors

25 October 2022 Friendly	Wycombe Wanderers XI	2–3	AFC Bournemouth Development	Marlow
13:00 BST	75'; Leathers 77'	Report	Marcondes 32', 42'; Gonzalez 35'	Stadium: Marlow Road Training Ground; Attendance: 0 (behind-closed-doors)

27 January 2023 Friendly	Woking	0–4	Wycombe Wanderers
		Report	De Barr; Freeman; Wakely; Matshazi

== Competitions ==
=== Overall record ===
Competition	First match	Last match	Starting round	Final position	Record							
Competition	First match	Last match	Starting round	Final position	Pld	W	D	L	GF	GA	GD	Win %
League One	30 July 2022	6 May 2023	Matchday 1	9th	46	20	9	17	59	51	+8	43.48
FA Cup	5 November 2022	5 November 2022	First round	First round	1	0	0	1	0	2	−2	0.00
EFL Cup	9 August 2022	24 August 2022	First round	Second round	2	1	0	1	3	4	−1	50.00
EFL Trophy	30 August 2022	18 October 2022	Group stage	Group stage	3	0	2	1	1	4	−3	0.00
Total					52	21	11	20	63	61	+2	40.38

Last updated: 7 May 2023
Source: [ Soccerway]

=== League One ===
==== League table ====
Pos	Team	Pld	W	D	L	GF	GA	GD	Pts	Promotion, qualification or relegation
6	Peterborough United	46	24	5	17	75	54	+21	77	Qualification for League One play-offs
7	Derby County	46	21	13	12	67	46	+21	76	
8	Portsmouth	46	17	19	10	61	50	+11	70	
9	Wycombe Wanderers	46	20	9	17	59	51	+8	69	
10	Charlton Athletic	46	16	14	16	70	66	+4	62	
11	Lincoln City	46	14	20	12	47	47	0	62	
12	Shrewsbury Town	46	17	8	21	52	61	−9	59	

Source: EFL Official Website
Rules for classification: 1) Points; 2) Goal difference; 3) Number of goals scored; 4) Head-to-head results; 5) Wins; 6) Away goals; 7) Penalty points (sec 9.5); 8) 12-point sending off offences

==== Results summary ====
Overall								Home						Away					
Pld	W	D	L	GF	GA	GD	Pts	W	D	L	GF	GA	GD	W	D	L	GF	GA	GD
46	20	9	17	59	51	+8	69	11	5	7	32	24	+8	9	4	10	27	27	0

Last updated: 7 May 2023.
Source: [ Soccerway]

==== Results by round ====
Round	1	2	3	4	5	6	7	8	9	10	11	12	13	14	15	16	17	18	19	20	21	22	23	24	25	26	27	28	29	30	31	32	33	34	35	36	37	38	39	40	41	42	43	44	45	46
Ground	H	A	H	A	A	H	A	H	A	A	H	A	H	A	H	H	H	A	A	H	A	H	H	A	A	H	H	A	H	A	H	A	H	H	A	A	H	A	H	A	H	A	A	H	H	A
Result	W	L	L	L	W	D	D	W	L	L	L	W	W	W	L	D	D	W	L	W	D	W	W	L	W	L	W	W	W	W	W	L	D	W	L	W	L	D	D	L	W	L	W	L	L	D
Position	1	11	18	20	13	12	14	10	16	17	19	15	12	12	13	13	12	10	12	10	9	7	6	8	7	7	7	8	7	7	7	7	7	7	8	7	8	8	8	8	8	8	8	9	9	9

Updated to match(es) played on 7 May 2023. Source: [ Soccerway]
A = Away; H = Home; W = Win; D = Draw; L = Loss; P = Postponed

==== Matches ====
Win Draw Loss Fixtures

On 23 June, the league fixtures were announced.

30 July 2022 1	Wycombe Wanderers	3–0	Burton Albion	High Wycombe
15:00 BST	Wheeler 7'; Mehmeti 16'; Scowen 30'	Report		Stadium: Adams Park; Attendance: 5,772 (253 away); Referee: Gavin Ward

6 August 2022 2	Bolton Wanderers	3–0	Wycombe Wanderers	Horwich
15:00 BST	Dempsey 15', 66'; Morley 41'	Report	Grimmer (yellow card) 21'; McCleary (yellow card) 60'	Stadium: University of Bolton Stadium; Attendance: 17,416 (416 away); Referee: Ben Toner

13 August 2022 3	Wycombe Wanderers	1–2	Shrewsbury Town	High Wycombe
15:00 BST	Horgan (yellow card) 28'; Forino (yellow card) 48'; McCleary 51'; Mehmeti (yellow card) 82'	Report	Pennington 60'; Leahy 89' (pen.)	Stadium: Adams Park; Attendance: 4,489 (282 away); Referee: Lee Swabey

16 August 2022 4	Exeter City	3–1	Wycombe Wanderers	Exeter
19:45 BST	Kite 22'; Collins 38'; Dieng 74'	Report	McCleary (yellow card) 45+1'; Wheeler 50'; Scowen (yellow card) 59'; Forino (yellow card) 73'	Stadium: St James Park; Attendance: 6,832 (367 away); Referee: John Busby

20 August 2022 5	Barnsley	0–3	Wycombe Wanderers	Barnsley
15:00 BST	Williams (yellow card) 46'; Benson (yellow card) 87'; Norwood (yellow card) 90+1'	Report	Mehmeti 37'; Obita (yellow card) 41'; Mawson (yellow card) 68'; Gape 72'; Freeman 83'	Stadium: Oakwell; Attendance: 9,978 (283 away); Referee: Ollie Yates

27 August 2022 6	Wycombe Wanderers	1–1	Charlton Athletic	High Wycombe
15:00 BST	Scowen (yellow card) 6'; Mehmeti 14'; Mawson (yellow card) 43'; Gape (yellow card) 45+2'; McCleary (yellow card) 90+1'	Report	Rak-Sakyi 15', (yellow card) 36'; Clare (yellow card) 34'; Leaburn (yellow card) 90+7'	Stadium: Adams Park; Attendance: 6,139 (1,638 away); Referee: David Rock

3 September 2022 7	Fleetwood Town	1–1	Wycombe Wanderers	Fleetwood
15:00 BST	Muskwe (yellow card) 52' (goal) 67'	Report	McCleary (red card) 10'; Mehmeti 39'; Stryjek (yellow card) 45+3'	Stadium: Highbury Stadium; Attendance: 2,936 (177 Away); Referee: James Oldham

10 September 2022	Wycombe Wanderers	Postponed	Port Vale	High Wycombe
15:00 BST				Stadium: Adams Park
Note: Fixture was postponed as a mark of respect following the passing of Queen Elizabeth II.

13 September 2022 8	Wycombe Wanderers	1–0	Accrington Stanley	High Wycombe
19:45 BST	McCarthy 21'; Scowen (yellow card) 90+4'	Report	Tharme (yellow card) 17'; Coyle (yellow card) 47'	Stadium: Adams Park; Attendance: 3,704 (70 away); Referee: Darren Drysdale

17 September 2022 9	Derby County	2–1	Wycombe Wanderers	Pride Park
15:00 BST	Hourihane (yellow card) 66' (goal) 72', 86'	Report	Tafazolli (yellow card) 14'; Mehmeti 15'; Vokes (yellow card) 68'	Stadium: Pride Park Stadium; Attendance: 24,784 (1,010 away); Referee: Sam Barrott

24 September 2022 10	Sheffield Wednesday	3–1	Wycombe Wanderers	Owlerton
15:00 BST	Jacobson 1' (o.g.); Bannan 32'; Paterson 90+6'	Report	Vokes 10'; Mawson (yellow card) 67'; Grimmer (yellow card) 85'	Stadium: Hillsborough Stadium; Attendance: 22,123; Referee: Matt Donohue

1 October 2022 11	Wycombe Wanderers	0–1	Plymouth Argyle	High Wycombe
15:00 BST		Report	Cosgrove 8' (pen.); Scarr (yellow card) 44'	Stadium: Adams Park; Attendance: 5,869 (1,200 away); Referee: John Busby

8 October 2022 12	Oxford United	0–1	Wycombe Wanderers	Littlemore
15:00 BST	Brannagan (penalty missed) 13'; Joseph (yellow card) 53'; Henry (yellow card) 56'	Report	Forino 33'; Jacobson (yellow card) 45+1'; Wing (yellow card) 51'; McCarthy (yellow card) 55'	Stadium: Kassam Stadium; Attendance: 10,007 (1,386 away); Referee: Keith Stroud
Note: The game was halted for 45 minutes due to a medical emergency in the crowd.

15 October 2022 13	Wycombe Wanderers	3–1	Peterborough United	High Wycombe
15:00 BST	Forino (yellow card) 12'; McCleary 45'; Vokes (yellow card) 57' (goal) 74'; Mehmeti 90+5'	Report	Burrows 22'	Stadium: Adams Park; Attendance: 5,085 (634 away); Referee: Charles Breakspear

22 October 2022 14	Milton Keynes Dons	0–1	Wycombe Wanderers	Denbigh
15:00 BST	Harvie (yellow card) 18'	Report	Freeman 40'; Jacobson (yellow card) 61'	Stadium: Stadium MK; Attendance: 7,377 (1,241 away); Referee: Oliver Langford

25 October 2022 15	Wycombe Wanderers	2–3	Cambridge United	High Wycombe
19:45 BST	Vokes 35'; Wheeler (yellow card) 76'; Kaikai (yellow card) 86'; Wing 90+7'	Report	Knibbs 6'; Lankester 45+1'; Brophy (yellow card) 50'; Jones 77'; Mannion (yellow card) 90+5'	Stadium: Adams Park; Attendance: 4,298 (285 Away); Referee: Peter Wright

29 October 2022 16	Wycombe Wanderers	1–1	Morecambe	High Wycombe
15:00 BST	Forino 20'; Mawson (yellow card) 79'; Stryjek (yellow card) 82'	Report	Weir (yellow card) 30'; Gibson (yellow card) 47'; Love (yellow card) 52'; Mayor 82'	Stadium: Adams Park; Attendance: 6,263 (138 away); Referee: Alan Young

1 November 2022 17	Wycombe Wanderers	2–2	Port Vale	High Wycombe
19:45 GMT	Mehmeti 4'; Wing 61' (yellow card) 88'; Wheeler (yellow card) 71'	Report	Robinson (yellow card) 45+1'; Wilson 45+7'; Conlon 77'	Stadium: Adams Park; Attendance: 4,192 (410 away); Referee: Robert Lewis

12 November 2022 18	Forest Green Rovers	0–2	Wycombe Wanderers	Nailsworth
15:00 GMT	Thomas (yellow card) 7'; Hendry (yellow card) 62'; Bunker (yellow card) 62'; March (yellow card) 62'	Report	Wheeler 14'; McCleary 27'; Mawson (yellow card) 31'; Grimmer (yellow card) 62'; Mehmeti (yellow card) 62'	Stadium: The New Lawn; Attendance: 2,468 (571 away); Referee: Sam Purkiss

19 November 2022 19	Cheltenham Town	1–0	Wycombe Wanderers	Cheltenham
15:00 GMT	May 26'	Report	Scowen (yellow card) 50'	Stadium: Whaddon Road; Attendance: 4,078 (644 away); Referee: Marc Edwards

4 December 2022 20	Wycombe Wanderers	2–0	Portsmouth	High Wycombe
12:30 GMT	Mehmeti 14'; Mawson (yellow card) 54'; McCleary 88'	Report	Ogilvie (yellow card) 39'; Robertson (yellow card) 67'	Stadium: Adams Park; Attendance: 6,306 (1,828 away); Referee: Scott Oldham

10 December 2022 21	Lincoln City	0–0	Wycombe Wanderers	Lincoln
15:00 GMT		Report		Stadium: Sincil Bank; Attendance: 7,536 (239 away); Referee: Thomas Kirk

17 December 2022 22	Wycombe Wanderers	1–0	Ipswich Town	High Wycombe
15:00 GMT	Wing (yellow card) 28'; Hanlan 40'; Mehmeti (yellow card) 61'; McCleary (yellow card) 73'; Mawson (yellow card) 88'	Report		Stadium: Adams Park; Attendance: 7,602 (2,612 away); Referee: Ben Toner

26 December 2022 23	Wycombe Wanderers	2–1	Bristol Rovers	High Wycombe
15:00 GMT	Obita (yellow card) 13'; Wheeler 22'; Grimmer (yellow card) 35'; Wing 48' (yellow card) 66'	Report	Coburn 4'; Thomas (yellow card) 8'; Gibson (yellow card) 45+2'	Stadium: Adams Park; Attendance: 6,664 (1,203 away); Referee: Sunny Sukhvir Gill

29 December 2022 24	Plymouth Argyle	1–0	Wycombe Wanderers	Plymouth
19:45 GMT	Lonwijk (yellow card) 24'; Scarr 33'	Report	Forino (yellow card) 29'; Thompson (yellow card) 79'	Stadium: Home Park; Attendance: 15,729 (427 away); Referee: Carl Brook

1 January 2023 25	Peterborough United	0–3	Wycombe Wanderers	Peterborough
15:00 GMT		Report	Wing 15', 75'; Tafazolli 67'	Stadium: London Road; Attendance: 7,483 (530 away); Referee: Sam Barrott

7 January 2023	Wycombe Wanderers	Postponed	Oxford United	High Wycombe
15:00 GMT				Stadium: Adams Park
Note: Fixture was postponed due to Oxford United's involvement in the third round of the FA Cup.

14 January 2023 26	Wycombe Wanderers	0–1	Sheffield Wednesday	High Wycombe
15:00 GMT	McCarthy (yellow card) 90+1'	Report	Vaulks 13'; Windass (yellow card) 72'	Stadium: Adams Park; Attendance: 8,302 (2,572 away); Referee: Sam Allison

21 January 2023	Bristol Rovers	Postponed	Wycombe Wanderers	Horfield
15:00 GMT				Stadium: Memorial Stadium
Note: Fixture was postponed following a pitch inspection by a PGMOL official confirmed the playing surface was unsafe due to standing water turning into ice.

24 January 2023 27	Wycombe Wanderers	2–0	Oxford United	High Wycombe
19:45 GMT	Vokes 19'; Mehmeti 35'; Stryjek (yellow card) 56'; Thompson (yellow card) 88'	Report	Anderson (yellow card) 26'	Stadium: Adams Park; Attendance: 5,935 (1,481 away); Referee: Neil Hair

28 January 2023	Wycombe Wanderers	Postponed	Fleetwood Town	High Wycombe
15:00 GMT				Stadium: Adams Park
Note: Fixture was postponed due to Fleetwood Town's involvement in the fourth round of the FA Cup.

4 February 2023 28	Port Vale	0–3	Wycombe Wanderers	Burslem
15:00 GMT	Butterworth (yellow card) 46'	Report	Hanlan 13'; Freeman (yellow card) 33'; Vokes (yellow card) 48'; Obita (yellow card) 73'; Jacobson 79' (pen.); McCleary 82'	Stadium: Vale Park; Attendance: 7,237 (389 away); Referee: Marc Edwards

11 February 2023 29	Wycombe Wanderers	3–2	Derby County	High Wycombe
15:00 GMT	Vokes 11'; Hanlan (yellow card) 37'; Wing 77', 86'; Obita (yellow card) 85'; Stryjek (yellow card) 89'	Report	Collins 66' (yellow card) 90'; Forsyth (yellow card) 70'; Dobbin 89'	Stadium: Adams Park; Attendance: 7,167 (1,853 away); Referee: Robert Lewis

14 February 2023 30	Accrington Stanley	0–2	Wycombe Wanderers	Accrington
19:45 GMT	Sangare (yellow card) 36'; Coyle (yellow card) 81'	Report	Scowen 18'; Vokes (yellow card) 38'; McCleary 90'	Stadium: Crown Ground; Attendance: 1,900 (201 away); Referee: Lewis Smith

18 February 2023 31	Wycombe Wanderers	1–0	Bolton Wanderers	High Wycombe
15:00 GMT	Obita (yellow card) 1'; Wing 45+8'; Scowen (yellow card) 89'	Report	Shoretire (yellow card) 53'; Morley (yellow card) 74'	Stadium: Adams Park; Attendance: 6,544 (1,475 away); Referee: Andy Woolmer

25 February 2023 32	Shrewsbury Town	2–0	Wycombe Wanderers	Shrewsbury
15:00 GMT	Willis 31' (o.g.); Bowman (yellow card) 69'; Leahy (yellow card) 73'; Bayliss (yellow card) 83'; Pyke 86'; Moore (yellow card) 90+2'	Report		Stadium: New Meadow; Attendance: 6,918 (601 away); Referee: Carl Brook

4 March 2023 33	Wycombe Wanderers	1–1	Exeter City	High Wycombe
15:00 GMT	Campbell 2'	Report	McDonald 68'; Hartridge (yellow card) 78'; Key (yellow card) 80'; Sweeney (yellow card) 83'	Stadium: Adams Park; Attendance: 7,699 (617 away); Referee: Tom Nield

7 March 2023 34	Wycombe Wanderers	2–0	Fleetwood Town	High Wycombe
19:45 GMT	Forino 4'; Vokes 66'	Report	Nsiala (yellow card) 73'	Stadium: Adams Park; Attendance: 3,560 (100 away); Referee: Craig Hicks

11 March 2023 35	Burton Albion	2–1	Wycombe Wanderers	Burton upon Trent
15:00 GMT	Taylor 10'; Powell 18'; Moon (yellow card) 30'; Oshilaja (red card) 45+1'	Report	Jacobson (penalty missed) 79'; De Barr 85'; Grimmer (yellow card) 90+2'; Scowen (yellow card) 90+3'	Stadium: Pirelli Stadium; Attendance: 2,965; Referee: Lee Swabey

14 March 2023 36	Bristol Rovers	0–2	Wycombe Wanderers	Horfield
19:45 GMT	Bogarde (yellow card) 71'	Report	Hanlan 16'; De Barr (yellow card) 42'; Campbell 62'; Scowen (yellow card) 80'	Stadium: Memorial Stadium; Attendance: 8,533 (436 away); Referee: Rebecca Welch

18 March 2023 37	Wycombe Wanderers	0–1	Barnsley	High Wycombe
15:00 GMT	Grimmer (yellow card) 45'	Report	Kitching (yellow card) 19'; Thomas (yellow card) 42'; Watters (yellow card) 45+5'; Tedić 85'; Andersen (yellow card) 90'	Stadium: Adams Park; Attendance: 5,185 (1,020 away); Referee: Charles Breakspear

25 March 2023 38	Charlton Athletic	1–1	Wycombe Wanderers	Charlton
15:00 GMT	Leaburn 16' (yellow card) 64'; Clare (yellow card) 43'; Hector (yellow card) 45'; Morgan (yellow card) 77'; Dobson (yellow card) 90+8'	Report	Forino 82'; Tafazolli (yellow card) 86'; Jacobson (yellow card) 90+7'; Grimmer (yellow card) 90+8'	Stadium: The Valley; Attendance: 15,278 (1,171 away); Referee: Scott Oldham

1 April 2023 39	Wycombe Wanderers	2–2	Milton Keynes Dons	High Wycombe
15:00 BST	Wheeler 22', 55'	Report	Harvie 9'; Eisa (yellow card) 29'; Watson (yellow card) 62'; Leko 71' (yellow card) 74'	Stadium: Adams Park; Attendance: 6,149 (893 away); Referee: Sam Purkiss

7 April 2023 40	Ipswich Town	4–0	Wycombe Wanderers	Ipswich
15:00 BST	Hirst 38'; Chaplin 45'; Burns 57'; Ladapo 76' (pen.)	Report	Forino-Joseph (yellow card) 52'; Tafazolli (yellow card) 89'	Stadium: Portman Road; Attendance: 28,511 (643 Away); Referee: David Rock

10 April 2023 41	Wycombe Wanderers	2–0	Forest Green Rovers	High Wycombe
15:00 BST	Campbell 9'; Savage 52'	Report	McGeouch (yellow card) 75'; Bunker (yellow card) 88'	Stadium: Adams Park; Attendance: 5,153; Referee: Carl Boyeson

15 April 2023 42	Morecambe	1–0	Wycombe Wanderers	Morecambe
15:00 BST	Cooney (yellow card) 61'; Crowley (yellow card) 80'; Stockton 89', (yellow card) 90'	Report	Forino-Joseph (yellow card) 69'; Thompson (yellow card) 86'	Stadium: The Mazuma Stadium; Attendance: 5,040 (234 Away); Referee: Andrew Kitchen

18 April 2023 43	Cambridge United	1–2	Wycombe Wanderers	Cambridge
19:45 BST	Smith 62'	Report	Tafazolli 33'; Wheeler 44'; Grimmer (yellow card) 52'	Stadium: Abbey Stadium; Attendance: 5,306 (261 Away); Referee: Ben Speedie

22 April 2023 44	Wycombe Wanderers	0–2	Lincoln City	High Wycombe
15:00 BST		Report	Duffy 7'; Roughan (yellow card) 24'; Plange (yellow card) 38'; Sørensen 71'; Eyoma (yellow card) 82'	Stadium: Adams Park; Attendance: 5,062 (405 Away); Referee: Anthony Backhouse

29 April 2023 45	Wycombe Wanderers	0–3	Cheltenham Town	High Wycombe
15:00 BST	Forino-Joseph (yellow card) 78'	Report	Keena 37' (pen.), (yellow card) 78', (goal) 88'; Rea (yellow card) 61'; May 68'; Ferry (yellow card) 86'	Stadium: Adams Park; Attendance: 5,188 (391 Away); Referee: Ross Joyce

7 May 2023 46	Portsmouth	2–2	Wycombe Wanderers	Portsmouth
12:00 GMT	Pack 44', (yellow card) 70'; Lane 72'	Report	McCleary 31'; Wing (yellow card) 45+1', (goal) 54'	Stadium: Fratton Park; Attendance: 18,286 (951 Away); Referee: Sunny Sukhvir Gill

=== FA Cup ===
On 17 October, Wycombe Wanderers were drawn at home to Walsall in the first round.

Win Draw Loss Fixtures

5 November 2022 First round	Wycombe Wanderers	0–2	Walsall	High Wycombe
15:00 GMT	Hanlan (penalty missed) 50'	Report	Maddox 41'; Hutchinson 62'	Stadium: Adams Park; Attendance: 2,319 (520 away); Referee: Martin Woods

=== EFL Cup ===
Win Draw Loss Fixtures

Wycombe were drawn away to Northampton Town in the first round. After beating Northampton Town 2–1, they were drawn at home to Bristol City in the second round.

9 August 2022 First round	Northampton Town	1–2	Wycombe Wanderers	Sixfields
19:45 BST	Appéré 76' (pen.)	Report	Jacobson 28'; Mellor 34'; Pattenden (yellow card) 54'	Stadium: Sixfields Stadium; Attendance: 2,711 (471 away); Referee: Tom Nield

24 August 2022 Second round	Wycombe Wanderers	1–3	Bristol City	High Wycombe
19:45 BST	Al-Hamadi 50'; Gape (yellow card) 78'	Report	Kadji 7'; Wilson 77'; Semenyo 90+3'	Stadium: Adams Park; Attendance: 3,116 (1,040 away); Referee: Andy Davies

=== EFL Trophy ===
On 20 June, the initial Group stage draw was made, grouping Wycombe Wanderers with Peterborough United and Stevenage. These fixtures were confirmed on 4 July 2022.

Pos	Div	Team	Pld	W	PW	PL	L	GF	GA	GD	Pts	Qualification
1	L2	Stevenage	3	3	0	0	0	6	1	+5	9	Advance to Round 2
2	L1	Peterborough United	3	1	0	1	1	5	3	+2	4	Advance to Round 2
3	L1	Wycombe Wanderers	3	0	2	0	1	1	4	−3	4	
4	ACA	Tottenham Hotspur U21	3	0	0	1	2	0	4	−4	1	

Source: EFL.com

Win Draw Loss Fixtures

30 August 2022 Group game 1	Wycombe Wanderers	0–0 (4–3 p)	Tottenham Hotspur U21	High Wycombe
19:00 BST	Young (yellow card) 41'	Report		Stadium: Adams Park; Attendance: 1,015 (76 away); Referee: Chris Pollard
	Penalties
	Al-Hamadi (penalty scored); Horgan (penalty scored); McCarthy (penalty missed); Wakely (penalty scored); Young (penalty scored)		Donley (penalty scored); John (penalty scored); Cesay (penalty missed); Santiago (penalty missed); Mathurin (penalty scored)

20 September 2022 Group game 2	Stevenage	3–0	Wycombe Wanderers	Stevenage
19:00 BST	Rose 4', 56'; Taylor (yellow card) 62'; Gilbey (yellow card) 69'; Vancooten 81'; Campbell (yellow card) 83'; Clark (yellow card) 86'	Report		Stadium: Broadhall Way; Attendance: 717 (97 away); Referee: Sunny Gill

18 October 2022 Group game 3	Wycombe Wanderers	1–1 (4–3 p)	Peterborough United	High Wycombe
19:00 BST	Horgan 60'; Forino (yellow card) 79'	Report	Clarke-Harris 83'; Ward (yellow card) 90+7'	Stadium: Adams Park; Attendance: 567 (84 away); Referee: Paul Howard
	Penalties
	Horgan (penalty scored); Wakely (penalty missed); Obita (penalty scored); Kaikai (penalty scored); Wing (penalty missed); Freeman (penalty scored)		Clarke-Harris (penalty scored); Watts (penalty missed); Tomlinson (penalty scored); Burrows (penalty scored); Ward (penalty missed); Edwards (penalty missed)

=== Berks & Bucks FA Senior Cup ===
As one of three EFL clubs competing in the Berks & Bucks FA Senior Cup, alongside Milton Keynes Dons and Reading, Wycombe Wanderers entered the competition in the quarter-finals. Wycombe Wanderers were drawn against either Southern Football League Premier South Division side Bracknell Town or Newport Pagnell Town of the United Counties League Premier Division South. Bracknell Town won the second-round tie to set up a quarter final with Wycombe Wanderers.

28 February 2023 Quarter-finals	Bracknell Town (Berkshire)	2–1	(Buckinghamshire) Wycombe Wanderers	Sandhurst
19:45 GMT	Grant 1', 19'	Report	Matshazi 64'	Stadium: Bottom Meadow

== Statistics ==
=== Appearances and goals ===
As of 7 May April 2023

No.	Pos	Nat	Player	Total		League One		FA Cup		EFL Cup		EFL Trophy	
No.	Pos	Nat	Player	Apps	Goals	Apps	Goals	Apps	Goals	Apps	Goals	Apps	Goals
1	GK	(Poland) POL	Max Stryjek	44	0	41	0	1	0	0	0	2	0
2	DF	(Scotland) SCO	Jack Grimmer	42	0	40	0	0	0	1	0	1	0
3	DF	(Wales) WAL	Joe Jacobson	38	2	34	1	0	0	2	1	2	0
4	MF	(England) ENG	Dominic Gape	16	1	15	1	0	0	1	0	0	0
5	DF	(Saint Lucia) LCA	Chris Forino	34	4	30	4	0	0	2	0	2	0
6	DF	(England) ENG	Ryan Tafazolli	26	2	25	2	1	0	0	0	0	0
7	MF	(England) ENG	David Wheeler	39	7	37	7	1	0	0	0	1	0
8	MF	(England) ENG	Curtis Thompson	6	0	6	0	0	0	0	0	0	0
9	FW	(Wales) WAL	Sam Vokes	37	6	35	6	1	0	0	0	1	0
10	MF	(England) ENG	Lewis Wing	48	9	44	9	1	0	2	0	1	0
12	FW	(Jamaica) JAM	Garath McCleary	39	7	39	7	0	0	0	0	0	0
13	GK	(England) ENG	Tyla Dickinson (Note: Tyla Dickinson is on loan at Sutton United.)	7	0	4	0	0	0	2	0	1	0
15	MF	(England) ENG	Jack Young	6	0	1	0	0	0	2	0	3	0
16	DF	(England) ENG	Jordan Willis	9	0	9	0	0	0	0	0	0	0
17	MF	(Republic of Ireland) IRL	Daryl Horgan (Note: Daryl Horgan is on loan at Stevenage.)	17	1	11	0	1	0	2	0	3	1
18	FW	(England) ENG	Brandon Hanlan	36	3	34	3	1	0	0	0	1	0
19	DF	(England) ENG	Jack Wakely	9	0	3	0	1	0	2	0	3	0
21	FW	(England) ENG	D'Mani Mellor (Note: D'Mani Mellor is on loan at Rochdale.)	12	1	9	0	1	0	1	1	1	0
22	MF	(England) ENG	Nick Freeman	48	2	43	2	1	0	2	0	2	0
23	DF	(England) ENG	Jordan Obita	34	0	29	0	1	0	2	0	2	0
24	MF	(England) ENG	Adam Leathers (Note: Adam Leathers is on loan at Maidenhead United.)	5	0	1	0	0	0	1	0	3	0
26	DF	(England) ENG	Jason McCarthy	39	1	36	1	1	0	1	0	1	0
27	FW	(Wales) WAL	Chem Campbell	17	3	17	3	0	0	0	0	0	0
28	MF	(England) ENG	Josh Scowen	35	2	35	2	0	0	0	0	0	0
29	FW	(Gibraltar) GIB	Tjay De Barr	21	1	19	1	1	0	1	0	0	0
30	GK	(England) ENG	Josh Blunkell	0	0	0	0	0	0	0	0	0	0
31	MF	(England) ENG	Jasper Pattenden	8	0	3	0	0	0	2	0	3	0
32	FW	(England) ENG	Charles Hagan	1	0	0	0	0	0	0	0	1	0
33	MF	(England) ENG	Luca Woodhouse (Note: Luca Woodhouse is on loan at Slough Town.)	0	0	0	0	0	0	0	0	0	0
34	FW	(England) ENG	Arnold Matshazi	2	0	0	0	0	0	1	0	1	0
35	MF	(England) ENG	Christie Ward	4	0	3	0	0	0	0	0	1	0
36	DF	(England) ENG	Antoine Makoli (Note: Antoine Makoli is on loan at Beaconsfield Town.)	0	0	0	0	0	0	0	0	0	0
37	DF	(England) ENG	Ben Kaninda (Note: Ben Kaninda is on loan at Hednesford Town.)	1	0	0	0	0	0	0	0	1	0
38	GK	(England) ENG	Harvey Cartwright	1	0	1	0	0	0	0	0	0	0
39	DF	(England) ENG	Declan Skura	0	0	0	0	0	0	0	0	0	0
Players who left the club before the end of the season:
27	FW	(England) ENG	Connor Parsons	3	0	0	0	0	0	1	0	2	0
25	FW	(Iraq) IRQ	Ali Al-Hamadi	13	1	9	0	0	0	2	1	2	0
16	FW	(Sierra Leone) SLE	Sullay Kaikai	10	0	7	0	1	0	0	0	2	0
11	MF	(Albania) ALB	Anis Mehmeti	30	9	27	9	1	0	2	0	0	0
20	DF	(England) ENG	Alfie Mawson	21	0	20	0	1	0	0	0	0	0
