= Lather =

Lather may refer to:

- Foam, a substance formed by gas bubbles trapped in a liquid or solid
- A type of shaving foam created by mixing shaving soap or shaving cream with water and agitating the mixture with a shaving brush
- Läther (pronounced "leather"), a Frank Zappa album
- Lather (song), a song by Jefferson Airplane
- Lather, a worker who installs the strips used in lath and plaster wall construction

== People ==
- Anoop Lather, Haryanvi film actor
- Anu Singh Lather (born 1962), Indian academic
- Barry Lather (born 1966), American Director & Choreographer
- Bhagmender Lather (born 1997), Indian cricketer
- Deepak Lather (born 2000), Indian weightlifter
- Mansi Lather – Indian freestyle wrestler (born 2007)
- Sandeep Kumar Lather – Indian police officer (died 2025)
- Sonia Lather (born 1992), Indian boxer
