= Arnold Matshazi =

English footballer

Personal information
- Full name: Arnold Tawanda Matshazi
- Date of birth: 2 November 2003 (age 23)
- Place of birth: Milton Keynes, England
- Position: Forward

Team information
- Current team: AFC Dunstable

Youth career
- –2020: Milton Keynes Dons
- 2020–2022: Blackpool

Senior career*
Years	Team	Apps	(Gls)
2022–2023	Wycombe Wanderers	0	(0)
2022–2023	→ Slough Town (loan)	12	(2)
2023	→ Hemel Hempstead Town (loan)	4	(0)
2023	Braintree Town	5	(0)
2023–2024	Hitchin Town	16	(3)
2023	→ Baldock Town (dual-reg.)	1	(0)
2024–2026	AFC Dunstable	15	(11)
2026–	Vermont Green FC	0	(1)
- * Club domestic league appearances and goals as of 21:50, 17 May 2026 (UTC)

Arnold Tawanda Matshazi (born 2 November 2003) is an English professional footballer who plays as a forward for AFC Dunstable.

== Career ==
Matshazi began his career with Milton Keynes Dons before moving onto Blackpool as a youth player, featuring for them in the EFL Youth Alliance, FA Youth Cup and Lancashire Youth Cup.

Matshazi joined Wycombe Wanderers in August 2022. He made his professional debut on 24 August 2022 as a substitute in a 3–1 loss against Bristol City in the EFL Cup second round. On 14 October 2022, Matshazi joined National League South side Slough Town on a one-month loan deal.

Following his departure from Wycombe, Matshazi returned to the National League South to join Braintree Town in August 2023. He later joined Hitchin Town in October that same year. During his spell at Hitchin, Matshazi also, spent time dual-registered with Spartan South Midlands League side, Baldock Town in November 2023, featuring just once in order to gain match fitness. On 26 January 2024, he joined AFC Dunstable, after leaving Hitchin Town for 'personal development reasons'.

== Career statistics ==
As of match played 1 May 2024

Appearances and goals by club, season and competition
Club	Season	League			FA Cup		League Cup		Other		Total	
Club	Season	Division	Apps	Goals	Apps	Goals	Apps	Goals	Apps	Goals	Apps	Goals
Wycombe Wanderers	2022–23	League One	0	0	0	0	1	0	1 (Note: Appearance in the EFL Trophy)	0	2	0
Slough Town (loan)	2022–23	National League South	12	2	—		—		2 (Note: Appearances in the FA Trophy)	1	14	3
Hemel Hempstead Town (loan)	2022–23	National League South	4	0	—		—		—		4	0
Braintree Town	2023–24	National League South	5	0	2	0	—		0	0	7	0
Hitchin Town	2023–24	Southern League Premier Division Central	16	3	—		—		0	0	16	3
Baldock Town (dual-reg.)	2023–24	Spartan South Midlands League Premier Division	1	0	—		—		0	0	1	0
AFC Dunstable	2023–24	Southern League Division One Central	15	11	—		—		1 (Note: Appearance in the Southern League Division One Central play-offs)	2	16	13
Career total			53	16	2	0	1	0	4	3	59	19
