= Josh Scowen =

English footballer (born 1993)

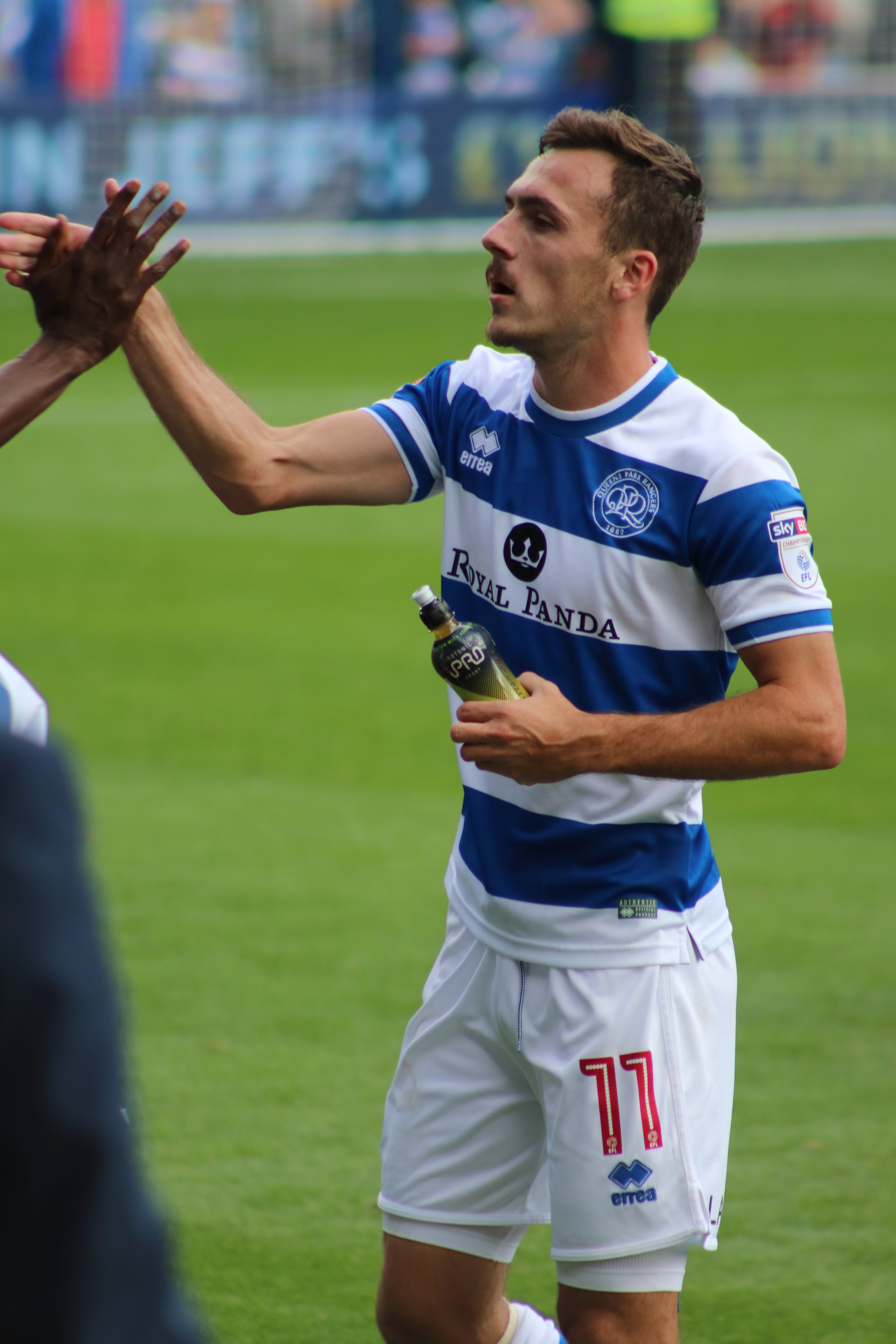
- Scowen playing for Queens Park Rangers in 2017

Personal information
- Full name: Joshua Charles Scowen
- Date of birth: 28 March 1993 (age 33)
- Place of birth: Cheshunt, England
- Height: 5 ft 10 in (1.78 m)
- Position: Midfielder

Team information
- Current team: Wycombe Wanderers
- Number: 4

Youth career
- –2011: Wycombe Wanderers

Senior career*
Years	Team	Apps	(Gls)
2011–2015	Wycombe Wanderers	91	(3)
2011–2012	→ Hemel Hempstead Town (loan)		
2012	→ Eastbourne Borough (loan)	8	(0)
2015–2017	Barnsley	96	(10)
2017–2020	Queens Park Rangers	95	(3)
2020–2021	Sunderland	47	(1)
2021–	Wycombe Wanderers	148	(4)
- * Club domestic league appearances and goals as of 18 March 2026 (UTC)

Joshua Charles Scowen (born 28 March 1993) is an English professional footballer who plays as a midfielder for EFL League One club Wycombe Wanderers.

== Career ==
=== Wycombe Wanderers ===
Scowen came through Wycombe Wanderers' youth system, making his professional debut on 26 March 2011, in their 3–0 away win over Morecambe in League Two. He came on as substitute for Kevin Betsy in the 89th minute. Wycombe striker, Scott Rendell said; "It's great to see him come out and get his chance because he will be a big player for this club if he carries on doing what he's doing."

In April 2011, he was one of four Wycombe academy scholars to be awarded professional contracts by the club. On 21 October 2011, he signed a three-month loan deal with Hemel Hempstead Town.

=== Eastbourne Borough (loan) ===
Scowen joined Eastbourne Borough on a six-month loan deal in August 2012, reuniting him with former Hemel Hempstead manager Tommy Widdrington.

=== Return to Wycombe ===
Scowen was immediately recalled by Wycombe following their appointment of Gareth Ainsworth as new manager. After a strong first half to the 2014–15 season, Scowen attracted the attention of several higher-league clubs, and in January 2015, Scowen left Wycombe to join Barnsley.

=== Barnsley ===
On 15 January 2015, Scowen joined League One, Barnsley.

=== Queens Park Rangers ===
On 1 July 2017, Scowen joined Championship club, Queens Park Rangers, following his decision to leave Barnsley at the end of his contract.

=== Sunderland ===
In January 2020 he joined Sunderland. On 8 September 2020 he scored his first goal for Sunderland in an EFL Trophy tie against Aston Villa U21s. On 25 May 2021 it was announced that he would leave Sunderland at the end of the season, following the expiry of his contract.

=== Return to Wycombe ===
On 29 June 2021, Scowen returned to sign for his first professional club Wycombe Wanderers on a two-year contract.

He signed a new one-year contract extension in April 2023.

== Career statistics ==
As of end of 2022–23 season

Appearances and goals by club, season and competition
Club	Season	League			FA Cup		League Cup		Other		Total	
Club	Season	Division	Apps	Goals	Apps	Goals	Apps	Goals	Apps	Goals	Apps	Goals
Wycombe Wanderers	2010–11	League Two	2	0	0	0	0	0	0	0	2	0
Wycombe Wanderers	2011–12	League One	0	0	0	0	0	0	0	0	0	0
Wycombe Wanderers	2012–13	League Two	34	1	1	0	0	0	1 (Note: Appearances in Football League Trophy)	0	36	1
Wycombe Wanderers	2013–14	League Two	37	1	2	0	1	0	2	0	42	1
Wycombe Wanderers	2014–15	League Two	18	1	2	0	0	0	0	0	20	1
Wycombe Wanderers	Total		91	3	5	0	1	0	3	0	100	3
Eastbourne Borough (loan)	2012–13	Conference South	8	0	0	0	—		0	0	8	0
Barnsley	2014–15	League One	21	4	0	0	0	0	0	0	21	4
Barnsley	2015–16	League One	34	4	1	0	2	1	6 (Note: Three appearances in Football League Trophy, three appearances in League One play-offs)	0	43	5
Barnsley	2016–17	Championship	41	2	2	0	1	1	—		44	3
Barnsley	Total		96	10	3	0	3	2	6	0	108	12
Queens Park Rangers	2017–18	Championship	42	1	1	0	0	0	—		43	1
Queens Park Rangers	2018–19	Championship	35	2	3	0	2	0	—		40	2
Queens Park Rangers	2019–20	Championship	18	0	1	1	1	0	—		20	1
Queens Park Rangers	Total		95	3	5	1	3	0	—		103	4
Sunderland	2019–20	League One	4	0	0	0	0	0	0	0	4	0
Sunderland	2020–21	League One	43	1	0	0	0	0	8 (Note: Six appearances two goals in Football League Trophy, two appearances in League One play-offs)	2	51	3
Sunderland	Total		47	1	0	0	0	0	8	2	55	3
Wycombe Wanderers	2021–22	League One	37	1	2	0	1	0	3 (Note: Appearances in League One play-offs)	0	43	1
Wycombe Wanderers	2022–23	League One	35	2	0	0	0	0	0	0	35	2
Wycombe Wanderers	Total		72	3	2	0	1	0	3	0	78	3
Career total			409	20	15	1	8	2	20	2	452	25

== Honours ==
Barnsley

- Football League One play-offs: 2016
- Football League Trophy: 2015–16

Sunderland

- EFL Trophy: 2020–21

Wycombe Wanderers

- EFL Trophy runner-up: 2023–24

Individual

- Wycombe Wanderers Player of the Season: 2022–23
