= The Anointment of Dionisio =

The Anointment of Dionisio: Prophecy and Politics in Renaissance Italy
- Author: Marion Leathers Kuntz
- Subject: Biography
- Publisher: Pennsylvania State University Press
- Publication date: 2001
- Pages: 446
- ISBN: 0271021349

The Anointment of Dionisio: Prophecy and Politics in Renaissance Italy is a 2001 book by American Renaissance historian Marion Leathers Kuntz. The book is a biography of Dionisio Gallo, a previously obscure 16th century humanist preacher based in Venice who advocated for clerical reforms and the destruction of heresy. Gallo's bold proclamations and flamboyant appearance won him detractors and followers; he eventually gained the attention of The Inquisition and was jailed. Kuntz retails how Gallo perplexed the inquisitors, who decided he was of unsound mind and exiled him from Venice, at which point biographical information on him is unavailable.

Kuntz's research into Gallo was praised, although Wietse de Boer, reviewing the book for Church History, thought that Kuntz took Gallo's self-descriptions at face value and could have further contextualized them.

== Commentary and reviews ==
- Anderson, Wendy Love (2003). "Review of The Anointment of Dionisio: Prophecy and Politics in Renaissance Italy". The Journal of Religion. 83 (4): 622–623. ISSN 0022-4189.
- Bowd, Stephen (1 June 2003). "Marion Leathers Kuntz. The Anointment of Dionisio: Prophecy and Politics in Renaissance Italy". The American Historical Review. 108 (3): 936–937. doi:10.1086/ahr/108.3.936.
- Brundin, Abigail (January 2004). "The anointment of Dionisio. Prophecy and politics in Renaissance Italy. By Marion Leathers Kuntz". The Journal of Ecclesiastical History. 55 (1): 174–175. doi:10.1017/S0022046903747198.
- Celenza, Christopher S. (2005). "Review of The Anointment of Dionisio: Prophecy and Politics in Renaissance Italy". The Catholic Historical Review. 91 (1): 165–167. ISSN 0008-8080.
- de Boer, Wietse (2003). "Review of The Anointment of Dionisio. Prophecy and Politics in Renaissance Italy". Church History. 72 (3): 649–651. ISSN 0009-6407.
- Hartle, Ann (2004). "Review of The Anointment of Dionisio: Prophecy and Politics in Renaissance Italy". The Review of Metaphysics. 57 (4): 849–851. ISSN 0034-6632.
- Kuehn, Thomas (September 2004). "The Anointment of Dionisio: Prophecy and Politics in Renaissance Italy. By Marion Leathers Kuntz". The Journal of Modern History. 76 (3): 709–710. doi:10.1086/425472. ISSN 0022-2801.
- Kirk, Thomas (2004). "Review of The Anointment of Dionisio: Prophecy and Politics in Renaissance Italy". History. 89 (1 (293)): 118. ISSN 0018-2648.
- Pullan, Brian (2004). "Review of The Anointment of Dionisio. Prophecy and Politics in Renaissance Italy". Renaissance Studies. 18 (1): 130–133. ISSN 0269-1213.
- Taylor, Larissa Juliet (2003). "Review of The Anointment of Dionisio: Prophecy and Politics in Renaissance Italy". Renaissance Quarterly. 56 (4): 1184–1185. doi:10.2307/1262000. ISSN 0034-4338.
- Treherne, Matthew (7 February 2003). "History: The Anointment of Dionisio". The Times Literary Supplement. No. 5210. p. 30.
- Wickersham, Jane K. (2004). "Review of The Anointment of Dionisio: Prophecy and Politics in Renaissance Italy". The Sixteenth Century Journal. 35 (2): 601–603. doi:10.2307/20477011. ISSN 0361-0160.
