= Manglish (film) =

2014 film by Salam Bappu

- Film poster
- Directed by: Salam Bappu
- Written by: Riyas
- Produced by: Haneef Muhammed
- Starring: Mammootty; Caroline Bech
- Cinematography: Pradeesh M. Varma
- Edited by: Vijay Sanker
- Music by: Gopi Sundar
- Distributed by: Red Rose Release
- Release date: 27 July 2014
- Running time: 144 minutes
- Country: India
- Language: Malayalam

Manglish is a 2014 Indian Malayalam-language action comedy film directed by Salam Bappu, and the features Mammootty and Dutch actress Caroline Bech in the lead. The film is produced by Haneef Muhammed under the banner of Red Rose Creations. Manglish is the first Malayalam film to be released in Dolby Atmos. The film is released on 25 July 2014 during the occasion of Eid-ul Fitr. Later the film was dubbed into Telugu as Malik Bhai.

Mammootty plays Malik Bhai, a wholesale fish auctioneer in Mattancherry market. An English lady, Michelle (Caroline Bech), arrives seeking help but the two have confusion in communicating with others. Manglish is a portmanteau, of Malayalam and English, used in popular culture of Kerala for speaking Malayalam incorporated with the English language.

== Cast ==
- Mammootty as Malik Bhai
- Caroline Bech as Michelle
- Srinda Ashab as Mumtaz
- Alexx O'Nell as Kevin
- Tini Tom as Boss
- Vinay Forrt as Dixon
- Suresh Krishna as Lakshman
- P.Balachandran as Krishna Swami
- Sunil Sukhada as Anglo Charlie
- Joju George as Luckochan
- Sathaar as Paulose Punnookaaran
- Raveendran as Pothen
- Sasi Kalinga as Mathukutty
- Ramu as Sulaiman Haji
- Sudheer Karamana as Jahangir
- Aneesh G Menon as Simmon
- Kalabhavan Haneefa as Chayakaran Mani
- Gopan as H.C Chandran
- Kalabhavan Rahman as Driver Rahman
- Mukundan as Adv. James
- Pauly Valsan as Veronica
- Sreedhanya as Seenath
- Sheelu Abraham as Lalitha
- Sudhi Koppa as Sahadevan
- Kalabavan Sinaj as Thoppumpadi Sathyan
- Chembil Ashokan as Union Leader
- Ullas Pandalam as Lorry driver

== Release ==
The film was released across Kerala on 27 July 2014. The film grossed ₹3.15 crore in around 5 days.
