= Charles Hagan =

English footballer

Personal information
- Full name: Charles Ekow Nartey Hagan
- Date of birth: 6 September 2001 (age 25)
- Position: Forward

Youth career
- Chelsea
- 2018–2020: Sheffield Wednesday

Senior career*
Years	Team	Apps	(Gls)
2020–2022	Sheffield Wednesday	0	(0)
2021–2022	→ Hampton & Richmond (loan)	5	(0)
2022–2023	Wycombe Wanderers	0	(0)
2023–2024	Hayes & Yeading United	?	(?)
2024	→ Corinthian-Casuals (loan)	?	(?)
2024	Hampton & Richmond	2	(0)
- * Club domestic league appearances and goals as of 21:55, 25 August 2025 (UTC)

Charles Hagan (born 6 September 2001) is an English professional footballer who last played as a forward for Hampton & Richmond Borough.

== Club career ==
On 2 July 2020, he signed his maiden professional contract with Sheffield Wednesday. A few months later he would make his senior debut coming off the bench in an EFL Cup game against Fulham. At the end of the 2020–21 season, he would be offered a new contract at the club. It was confirmed that he had signed a new deal at the club on 26 June 2021. On 9 September 2021, he joined Hampton & Richmond Borough on loan until the end of January 2022. On 5 January 2022, it was confirmed that Hagan had returned to Sheffield Wednesday following the end of his loan. On 16 March 2022, manager Darren Moore announced he would be leaving the club upon the expiry of his contract.

On 18 August 2022, Hagan joined Wycombe Wanderers.

== Career statistics ==
As of match played 30 August 2022

Appearances and goals by club, season and competition
Club	Season	League			FA Cup		League Cup		Other		Total	
Club	Season	Division	Apps	Goals	Apps	Goals	Apps	Goals	Apps	Goals	Apps	Goals
Sheffield Wednesday	2020–21	Championship	0	0	0	0	1	0	0	0	1	0
Sheffield Wednesday	2021–22	League One	0	0	0	0	0	0	0	0	0	0
Sheffield Wednesday	Total		0	0	0	0	1	0	0	0	1	0
Hampton & Richmond (loan)	2021–22	National League South	5	0	2	0	—		1 (Note: Appearance(s) in FA Trophy)	0	8	0
Wycombe Wanderers	2022–23	League One	0	0	0	0	0	0	1 (Note: Appearance(s) in EFL Trophy)	0	1	0
Career total			5	0	2	0	1	0	2	0	9	0
