= Anis Mehmeti =

Albanian footballer

Personal information
- Full name: Anis Mehmeti
- Date of birth: 9 January 2001 (age 25)
- Place of birth: Islington, England
- Height: 5 ft 11 in (1.80 m)
- Positions: Attacking midfielder; left midfielder; winger

Team information
- Current team: Ipswich Town
- Number: 33

Youth career
- –2015: Fulham
- 2016–2017: Tottenham Hotspur
- 2017–2019: Norwich City

Senior career*
Years	Team	Apps	(Gls)
2019–2020	Norwich City	0	(0)
2019–2020	→ Woodford Town (loan)	11	(1)
2020–2023	Wycombe Wanderers	88	(19)
2023–2026	Bristol City	123	(25)
2026–	Ipswich Town	18	(2)

International career^{‡}
2017	Albania U16	3	(0)
2019	Albania U19	1	(0)
2021	Albania U21	3	(1)
2023–	Albania	9	(1)
- * Club domestic league appearances and goals as of 22:57, 4 May 2026 (UTC) ‡ National team caps and goals as of 6 October 2026

Anis Mehmeti (born 9 January 2001) is a professional footballer who plays as an attacking midfielder for Premier League club Ipswich Town. Born in England, he plays for the Albania national team.

After progressing through the youth systems of Fulham, Tottenham Hotspur and Norwich City, he began his senior career with Wycombe Wanderers in 2020. He joined Bristol City in January 2023 before moving to Ipswich Town in January 2026, helping the club secure promotion to the Premier League in his first season.

At international level, he represented Albania at under-16, under-19 and under-21 levels before making his senior debut in March 2023 and scoring first goal in September 2026.

== Club career ==
=== Early career ===
Born in Islington, London, Mehmeti is of Albanian heritage and speaks Albanian. He developed through the youth systems of Fulham and Tottenham Hotspur before joining Norwich City in 2017. In July 2019, he signed a contract extension with Norwich until June 2020.

In November 2019, Mehmeti joined Essex Senior League side Woodford Town on loan from Norwich. He scored twice in 14 league appearances, including in a 1–1 draw against Saffron Walden Town that month. He returned to Norwich in March 2020 after the season was curtailed due to the COVID-19 pandemic and was released later that year.

=== Wycombe Wanderers ===
On 29 September 2020, Mehmeti joined EFL Championship side Wycombe Wanderers as part of the club's newly established B Team programme, having previously played in non-League football. He made his professional debut on 17 October, coming on as a 79th-minute substitute in a 2–1 defeat to Millwall. He scored his first professional goal on 19 December, netting a late equaliser in a 1–1 draw against Queens Park Rangers. He finished the 2020–21 season with 29 league appearances and three goals, although Wycombe were relegated to EFL League One.

On 30 November 2021, Mehmeti signed a contract extension keeping him at Wycombe until June 2024. He scored seven goals in 32 league appearances during the 2021–22 season, as Wycombe finished sixth and reached the League One play-off final, where they lost 2–0 to Sunderland. He scored nine goals and provided four assists in 27 league appearances in the following campaign before leaving in January 2023. He made 97 appearances and scored 19 goals in all competitions for Wycombe, with his transfer to Bristol City described by the club as a record sale.

=== Bristol City ===
On 31 January 2023, Mehmeti signed for Championship club Bristol City on a three-and-a-half-year contract for an undisclosed fee. The transfer was described by Wycombe as a club-record sale. He made 15 league appearances and scored once during the remainder of the 2022–23 EFL Championship season. His performances for Bristol City earned him his first call-up and subsequent debut for the Albania senior team in March 2023, making his international debut in a Euro 2024 qualifying.

On 5 March 2024, he scored in a 3–2 defeat to Ipswich Town. Later that month, he netted the winning goal in a 1–0 victory over Leicester City. Mehmeti finished with four goals scored and 38 appearances in the 2023–24 EFL Championship season. He also started all four of Bristol City's matches in the 2023–24 FA Cup, including their third-round victory over West Ham United and their fourth-round elimination by Nottingham Forest on penalties.

On 30 November 2024, Mehmeti scored twice and provided an assist in a 4–0 victory over Plymouth Argyle, prompting praise from head coach Liam Manning. He scored twice again in a 2–0 win over Stoke City on 12 February 2025, taking his league tally for the season to 11 goals. He finished the 2024–25 season with 12 league goals as Bristol City's top scorer, helping the club finish sixth and qualify for the promotion play-offs. Bristol City were eliminated by Sheffield United in the semi-finals, losing 6–0 on aggregate.

Mehmeti reached 100 Championship appearances for Bristol City in September 2025. He scored eight goals in 28 league appearances during the first half of the 2025–26 EFL Championship season.

=== Ipswich Town ===
On 23 January 2026, Mehmeti joined Ipswich Town for an undisclosed fee, signing a contract until 2029. He made his debut the following day, coming on as a substitute in a 3–1 defeat to Sheffield United. On 21 February, Mehmeti scored his first goal for Ipswich in a 5–3 away defeat to Wrexham, opening his account in the 20th minute.

A week later, Mehmeti scored the opening goal in a 3–0 victory over Swansea City, his first at Portman Road. He made 18 league appearances and scored twice for Ipswich during the 2025–26 season, as the club finished second and secured automatic promotion to the Premier League.

On 15 September 2026, Mehmeti scored against Arsenal in a 4–2 defeat in the third round of the EFL Cup.

== International career ==
Mehmeti represented Albania at under-16, under-19 and under-21 levels, scoring once for the latter during a 2023 UEFA European Under-21 Championship qualification match against Andorra in June 2021.

In March 2023, Mehmeti received his first call-up to the Albanian senior team under head coach Sylvinho and made his debut later that month in a Euro 2024 qualifying match against Poland. He made two further substitute appearances in June 2023, in victories over Moldova and the Faroe Islands. He was not selected for Albania's remaining qualifying matches or its squad for UEFA Euro 2024 finals, despite solid performances for Bristol City as Albania finished top of its qualifying group and secured a place at the tournament. In October 2025, Sylvinho attributed Mehmeti's continued absence from the squad to competition for places on the left wing.

Mehmeti was recalled to the squad in March 2026 for the 2026 FIFA World Cup play-offs against Poland, remaining an unused substitute in a 2–1 defeat as Albania were eliminated from the competition. He returned to the pitch for Albania on 31 March, playing the second half of a 1–0 friendly defeat to Ukraine. Following the appointment of Rolando Maran as head coach in May 2026, Mehmeti continued to feature for the national team and was included in Albania's squads for the September and October 2026–27 UEFA Nations League C matches. He scored his first senior international goal in a 3–0 away win over San Marino on 29 September.

== Career statistics ==
=== Club ===
As of match played 15 September 2026

Appearances and goals by club, season and competition
Club	Season	League			FA Cup		EFL Cup		Other		Total	
Club	Season	Division	Apps	Goals	Apps	Goals	Apps	Goals	Apps	Goals	Apps	Goals
Woodford Town	2019–20	Essex Senior League	11	1	—		—		3 (Note: One appearance in Errington Challenge Cup, one appearance in London Senior Cup, one appearance and one goal in Peter Butcher Memorial Trophy)	1	14	2
Wycombe Wanderers	2020–21	Championship	29	3	0	0	—		—		29	3
Wycombe Wanderers	2021–22	League One	32	7	2	0	2	0	2 (Note: Appearances in EFL Trophy)	0	38	7
Wycombe Wanderers	2022–23	League One	27	9	1	0	2	0	0	0	30	9
Wycombe Wanderers	Total		88	19	3	0	4	0	2	0	97	19
Bristol City	2022–23	Championship	15	1	—		—		—		15	1
Bristol City	2023–24	Championship	38	4	4	0	2	0	—		44	4
Bristol City	2024–25	Championship	42	12	1	0	1	0	2 (Note: Appearances in EFL Championship play-offs)	0	46	12
Bristol City	2025–26	Championship	28	8	1	1	2	0	—		31	9
Bristol City	Total		123	25	6	1	5	0	2	0	136	26
Ipswich Town	2025–26	Championship	18	2	1	0	—		—		19	2
Ipswich Town	2026–27	Premier League	0	0	0	0	1	1	—		1	1
Ipswich Town	Total		18	2	1	0	1	1	—		20	3
Career total			240	47	10	1	10	1	7	1	267	50

=== International ===
As of match played 6 October 2026

Appearances and goals by national team and year
National team	Year	Apps	Goals
Albania
Albania	2023	3	0
Albania	2026	6	1
Total		9	1

Scores and results list Albania's goal tally first, score column indicates score after each Mehmeti's goal.

List of international goals scored by Anis Mehmeti
No.	Date	Venue	Cap	Opponent	Score	Result	Competition
1	29 September 2026	San Marino Stadium, Serravalle, San Marino	7	San Marino	1–0	3–0	2026–27 UEFA Nations League
