= Leather (surname) =

Leather is a surname. Notable people with the surname include:

- Diane Leather (1933–2018), English athlete and first woman to run a sub-5-minute mile
- Edwin Leather, conservative politician in the United Kingdom, and Governor of Bermuda
- Ella Mary Leather, folklorist
- Roland Leather, British cricketer for Yorkshire County Cricket Club
- Stephen Leather, English author of thrillers
- Suzi Leather, British member of the Labour Party

Fictional characters:

- Bret Leather, character appearing in Planetary

== See also ==
- Leathers (surname)
