= Lewis Wing =

English association football player

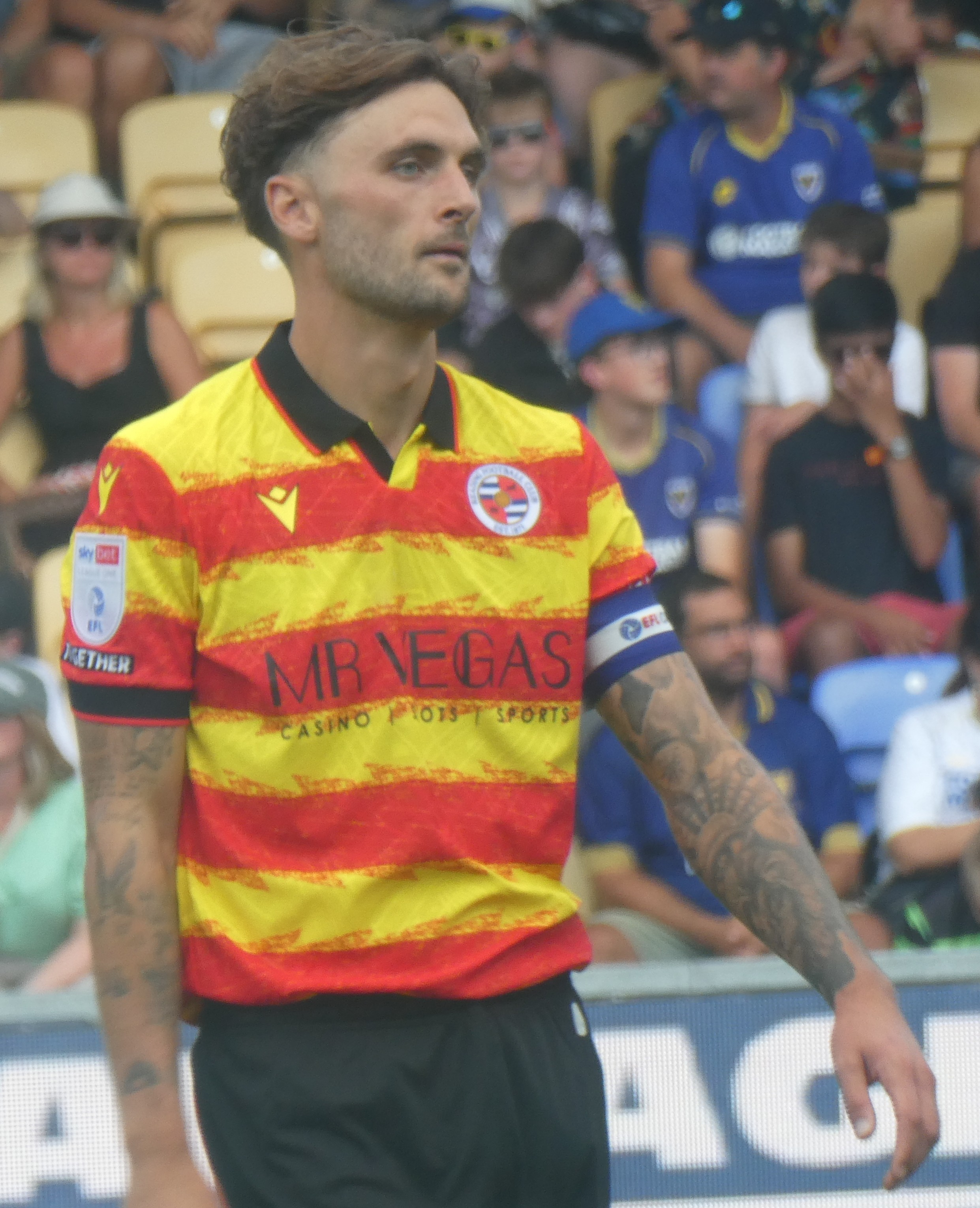
- Wing playing for Reading in 2026

Personal information
- Full name: Lewis Wing
- Date of birth: 23 June 1995 (age 31)
- Place of birth: Newton Aycliffe, England
- Height: 1.85 m (6 ft 1 in)
- Position: Attacking midfielder

Team information
- Current team: Reading
- Number: 10

Youth career
- –2009: Darlington

Senior career*
Years	Team	Apps	(Gls)
- Brandon United
2012	Newton Aycliffe		
2012–	Esh Winning		
–2014	Tow Law Town		
2014	Seaham Red Star		
2014	Darlington 1883	2	(0)
2014	Seaham Red Star		
2014	Newton Aycliffe	5	(0)
2014–2015	Seaham Red Star		
2015–2017	Shildon	73	(36)
2015	→ Seaham Red Star (loan)		
2017–2022	Middlesbrough	80	(12)
2018	→ Yeovil Town (loan)	20	(3)
2021	→ Rotherham United (loan)	20	(2)
2021–2022	→ Sheffield Wednesday (loan)	18	(0)
2022–2023	Wycombe Wanderers	57	(11)
2023–	Reading	135	(30)
- * Club domestic league appearances and goals as of 17:10, 20 August 2026 (UTC)

Lewis Wing (born 23 June 1995) is an English professional footballer who plays as an attacking midfielder for EFL League One club Reading.

== Club career ==
=== Early career ===
Born in Newton Aycliffe, County Durham, Wing attended Woodham Comprehensive School followed by Durham Sixth Form Centre where he studied Sports Science. He started playing football from the age of five for Newton Aycliffe Sports Club going on to play for Norton & Stockton Ancients as a junior. Wing later ended up in the youth system of Darlington until he was released at the age of 14 for "being too small". Wing quit playing football for two years following his release by Darlington, instead he focused on getting his golf handicap down to five until he was invited to play for local Sunday league side Newton Aycliffe Working Men's Club who were at the time managed by his cousin Jason Steele.

While playing Sunday league football and still at college, Wing was scouted by Northern League side Brandon United who he made his senior debut for at the age of 16. He combined playing football and his studies with employment at a branch of Tesco in Newton Aycliffe in the evenings. Wing then played for his home town club Newton Aycliffe, before in September 2012 he joined Esh Winning. He eventually joined Northern League Division Two side Tow Law Town, where he established himself as a regular member of the first team for a couple of seasons.

On 3 January 2014, Wing left Tow Law Town to sign for fellow Northern League Division Two side Seaham Red Star. Wing made his debut for Seaham Red Star in a 2–1 victory against Heaton Stannington, on 5 January 2014. After two months with Seaham Red Star, Wing left to rejoin Darlington 1883 five years after they released him from their youth system. Wing made two appearances as a sub for Darlington before returning to Seaham Red Star. Having started the 2013–14 season back at Newton Aycliffe where he made five further league appearances, Wing rejoined Seaham Red Star for a third spell on 28 August 2014. Wing's performances helped inspire Seaham Red Star to win the Northern League Division Two title in 2015.

Having previously turned down a move to Spennymoor Town during the 2014–15 season, Wing signed for Northern League Division One side Shildon in June 2015. While he returned to Seaham Red Star on loan for eight weeks in November 2015, Wing's first season saw him score 11 goals in 42 appearances for Shildon, as the club won the Northern League Division One title, their first Northern League title since the 1930s.

Wing's second season with Shildon would turn out to be even more prolific as he netted 37 times for the Northern League outfit.

=== Middlesbrough ===
His performances for Shildon led to Wing being scouted by Championship side Middlesbrough, with whom he signed a pre-contract agreement in March 2017. The deal was confirmed on 28 June 2017, with Wing signing a one-year contract and linking up with the Middlesbrough under-23s team. On 24 August 2017, he made his debut for the club in the EFL Cup, coming on as a late substitute for Grant Leadbitter in a 3–0 win over Scunthorpe United at the Riverside Stadium. In November 2017, having played in one further EFL Cup match, Wing signed a contract extension with Middlesbrough to extend his stay until the end of the 2018–19 season.

==== Yeovil Town loan ====
On 5 January 2018, Wing joined League Two side Yeovil Town on loan until the end of the season. He made his debut in the FA Cup, coming on as a late substitute for Jared Bird in a 2–0 victory over Bradford City at Huish Park. Wing scored his first goal for the club on 20 January 2018 in a 1–2 loss to Chesterfield. He would go on to score two more goals and provide an assist in 22 total appearances for the club.

==== Return to Middlesbrough ====
Wing started his first league game for Middlesbrough on 7 August 2018, providing two assists in a 3–0 victory over Sheffield United. In October 2018, Wing extended his contract at the Middlesbrough until the end of the 2021-22 season.

==== Loan to Rotherham ====
On 1 February 2021, Wing joined Rotherham United on loan until the end of the 2020–21 season. He made his debut as a substitute in the 3–0 home victory against Derby County on 3 February 2021.

==== Loan to Sheffield Wednesday ====
On 27 July 2021, Wing joined Sheffield Wednesday on a season-long loan deal. He would make his competitive debut on 1 August 2021, at home to Huddersfield Town in the EFL Cup. His first goal would come against Mansfield Town in the EFL Trophy on 5 October 2021.

=== Wycombe Wanderers ===
On 31 January 2022, Wing joined League One side Wycombe Wanderers on a permanent basis, on a 6 month contract. He scored his first two goals for the club in a 3-1 victory over Crewe Alexandra on 5 March. He ended the 2022–23 season as Wycombe's joint-top goal scorer on nine, but rejected a new contract and chose to leave the club in May 2023.

=== Reading ===
On 21 July 2023, Reading announced the signing of Wing to a three-year contract. Wing enjoyed a successful first season with Reading, picking up the Player of the Season award; Wing won the award after scoring 11 and assisting 11 goals across all competitions as Reading finished 17th.

On 19 October 2024, Wing scored from outside of the box to put Reading in a 2-1 lead over Crawley. The goal was praised as one of the best goals of the League One season.

On 23 May 2025, Wing signed a new contract with Reading, keeping him at the club until the summer of 2028. On 31 July 2025, Wing was announced as Reading's new Club Captain.

== Personal life ==
Wing is related to former Middlesbrough and current Brighton & Hove Albion goalkeeper Jason Steele.

== Career statistics ==
As of match played 15 August 2026

Appearances and goals by club, season and competition
Club	Season	League			FA Cup		EFL Cup		Other		Total	
Club	Season	Division	Apps	Goals	Apps	Goals	Apps	Goals	Apps	Goals	Apps	Goals
Tow Law Town	2013–14	NL Division Two	—		—		—		—		—	
Seaham Red Star	2013–14	NL Division Two	—		—		—		—		—	
Darlington 1883	2013–14	NPL Division One North	2	0	—		—		—		2	0
Newton Aycliffe	2014–15	NL Division One	5	0	0	0	—		0	0	5	0
Seaham Red Star	2014–15	NL Division Two	—		—		—		—		—	
Shildon	2015–16	NL Division One	32	9	2	0	—		8 (Note: One appearance in FA Vase, four appearances and two goals in Northern League Cup, two appearances in Durham Challenge Cup, one appearance in Cleator Cup)	2	42	11
Shildon	2016–17	NL Division One	41	27	4	3	—		12 (Note: Four appearances and two goals in FA Vase, four appearances and one goal in Northern League Cup, three appearances and four goals in Durham Challenge Cup, one appearance in Cleator Cup)	7	57	37
Shildon	Total		73	36	6	3	—		20	9	99	48
Seaham Red Star (loan)	2015–16	NL Division One	—		—		—		—		—	
Middlesbrough	2017–18	Championship	0	0	0	0	2	0	—		2	0
Middlesbrough	2018–19	Championship	28	3	3	1	3	1	—		34	5
Middlesbrough	2019–20	Championship	40	7	1	0	0	0	—		41	7
Middlesbrough	2020–21	Championship	12	2	1	0	2	0	—		15	2
Middlesbrough	2021–22	Championship	0	0	0	0	0	0	—		0	0
Middlesbrough	Total		80	12	5	1	7	1	—		92	14
Middlesbrough U23	2017–18	—			—		—		1 (Note: Appearance in EFL Trophy)	0	1	0
Middlesbrough U23	2018–19	—			—		—		1	0	1	0
Yeovil Town (loan)	2017–18	League Two	20	3	2	0	—		—		22	3
Rotherham United (loan)	2020–21	Championship	20	2	—		—		—		20	2
Sheffield Wednesday (loan)	2021–22	League One	18	0	2	0	1	0	3	1	24	1
Wycombe Wanderers	2021–22	League One	13	2	—		—		2 (Note: Appearance in League One play-offs)	0	15	2
Wycombe Wanderers	2022–23	League One	44	9	1	0	2	0	1	0	48	9
Wycombe Wanderers	Total		57	11	1	0	2	0	3	0	63	11
Reading	2023–24	League One	42	10	2	1	1	0	4	0	49	11
Reading	2024–25	League One	46	9	2	1	1	1	1	0	50	11
Reading	2025–26	League One	46	11	1	1	1	0	0	0	48	12
Reading	2026–27	League One	1	0	0	0	1	0	0	0	2	0
Reading	Total		135	30	5	3	4	1	5	0	149	34
Career total			410	94	21	7	14	2	33	10	478	113

== Honours ==
Individual

- Reading Player of the Season: 2023–24
- PFA Team of the Year: 2025–26 League One
