= Sandeep Kumar Lather =

Indian police officer (died 2025)

ASI Sandeep Kumar Lather
- Born: Julana, Jind district, Haryana, India
- Died: 14 October 2025; Ladhot village, Rohtak district, Haryana, India
- Cause of death: Suicide by gunshot – service revolver
- Occupations: Assistant Sub-Inspector (Cyber Cell), Haryana Police
- Years active: –2025
- Known for: Video and note alleging corruption in Haryana Police; the investigation following his death

Sandeep Kumar Lather (died 14 October 2025) was an Assistant Sub-Inspector (ASI) in the Haryana Police, India. He was posted in the Cyber Cell, Rohtak, and died by suicide on 14 October 2025. His death drew significant public and media attention due to the video and note he left behind, which alleged corruption by a senior police officer. A Special Investigation Team (SIT) was constituted by Haryana Police in connection with the case.

== Career ==
Lather served as an ASI with the Haryana Police and was assigned to the Cyber Cell at the Rohtak district office. His work involved cyber and technical investigations.

== Death and aftermath ==
On 14 October 2025, Lather was found dead in the village of Ladhot (Rohtak district) after reportedly shooting himself with his service revolver.

According to police and media reports, he recorded a video message and left a four-page note before his death, in which he accused the late IPS officer Y. Puran Kumar, who had himself died by suicide days earlier, of corruption and other misconduct.

A First information report (FIR) was registered on his wife's complaint and a Special Investigation Team (SIT) was set up to probe the circumstances, including allegations of abetment to suicide. His body was cremated on 16 October 2025 in his native town of Julana, Jind district.
