= Salam Bappu =

Indian film director

- Born: Salam; 15 May 1975 (age 51); Malappuram, Kerala, India
- Other name: Salam Palapetty
- Citizenship: India
- Occupation: Film director
- Years active: 2013 – present
- Spouse: Ameena Salam
- Children: 2

Salam Bappu is an Indian film director working in Malayalam cinema. He made his debut with the movie Red Wine (2013) and later directed Manglish (2014). His new movie Aayirothonnaam Raavu shoot is progressing at Dubai.

== Biography ==
Salam Bappu was born on 15 May 1975 at Palapetty, a village in Ponnani, Malappuram, Kerala to Bappu Haji and Ayishumma.

After completing his schooling at Govt High School Palapetty, he pursued his graduation from M.E.S. Ponnani College, Ponnani (1992-1995), and Kerala Law Academy Law College, Trivandrum (1997-2000). Also, he holds a Post graduate diploma in Journalism from Institute of Journalism, Press Club Trivandrum (2001). He enrolled as advocate from Kerala High Court, Kochi and practiced as an advocate at Ponnani bar. He worked as a script writer in Asianet.

He started his film career in 2001 as an assistant to Malayalam director Lal Jose. Meesha madhavan (2002), Pattalam(2003), Rasikan (2004), Chandu Pottu (2005), Aparichithan (2003), Achanurangatha veedu (2006), Classmates (2006), Arabhi kadha (2007), Mulla (2008), Neelathamara (2009), Kerala Cafe (2009) Elsamma enna aankutty (2010), Spanish masala (2012), Diamond Necklace (2012), Ayaalum Njaanum Thammil (2012), Kaanchipurathe Kalyanam, Kallanum Polisum, Thaavalam, Maharaja Talkies, Vadhyaar, Oridathoru postman and Arjunan Saakshi are some of the films that he worked on as an associate. Salam Bappu holds the credit of co-directing a Bangladeshi film namely, "Eytho Prem". Apart from this Bangladeshi film, he played a role in the making of an Omani film named "Aseel". It was the second movie ever made in Oman.

His debut as an independent director was marked by the release of the movie Red Wine, starred Mohanlal, Fahadh Faasil, and Asif Ali. His second movie is Manglish first Dolby Atmos soundtrack movie in Malayalam cinema, casting Mammootty, Holland actress Caroline bech, joju George, Vinay Forrt, Tini Tom. He acted three Malayalam movies named Kappela (2020), Cabin (2021), Mission C (2021). He scripted a Kannada movie named "Srikrishna@gmail.com". He was the Vice President and treasurer of Fefka Director's union.

== Filmography ==
| Year | Title | Notes |
|---|---|---|
| 2013 | Red Wine | |
| 2014 | Manglish | |
| TBA | Aayirothonnaam Raavu | |
