= Chatham Town F.C. =

Association football club in England

Chatham Town
- Full name: Chatham Town Football Club
- Nickname: The Chats
- Founded: 1882; 144 years ago
- Ground: The Bauvill Stadium, Chatham
- Capacity: 3,000 (500 seated)
- Coordinates: 51°22′07″N 0°31′17″E
- Chairman: Kevin Hake
- Manager: Kevin Hake
- League: Isthmian League Premier Division
- 2025–26: Isthmian League Premier Division, 4th of 22
- Website: http://www.chathamtownfc.com
Home colours	Away colours

Chatham Town Football Club is an English professional association football club based in Chatham, Kent. They currently play in the Isthmian Premier Division, and are nicknamed The Chats.

Former Premier League clubs Portsmouth and West Ham United played their first competitive matches against Chatham.

== History ==
The club was formed in 1882 as Chatham United, when Rochester Invicta merged with the Royal Engineers Band football team. Chatham played their home games at the Army owned pitches called "The Lines", where they were to remain until 1889 when they moved to the Maidstone Road Ground. The move to the new ground was prompted when the club reached the quarter-finals of the FA Cup in 1888–89, and admission fees could not be charged at "The Lines" because of Army regulations. This cup run was also instrumental in the Football Association's ruling that all future matches in the competition must be played on fully enclosed grounds, where the visiting club would receive a share of the gate money. So the club moved to the Maidstone Road site which was owned by a George Winch, who allowed the club to enclose the ground and build a pavilion with seats in front for £125.

In 1894 Chatham became founder members of both the Southern League and the original Kent League, winning the Kent League in its inaugural season. For the first two seasons the club competed in both leagues, but left the Kent League to concentrate on the Southern League in 1896. In the 1900–01 season, owing to financial difficulties, Chatham resigned from the Southern League. They played as Chatham Amateurs in 1901 for a season and rejoined the Kent League, where two seasons later in 1903/04, they won the Kent league and repeated the same feat the following season, as well as winning the Kent Senior Cup.

After World War I, Chatham returned to play and in the 1919 season won the Kent Victory Cup and the Chatham Charity Cup. They rejoined the Southern League in 1920–21, but withdrew at the end of the season because of the burden of travel costs on club finances. In 1927–28 they rejoined the Southern League for two seasons. Again, the expenses to play proved a financial strain on the club, and returned to the Kent League. The club struggled financially and for the 1933–34 season the club took a voluntary relegation into Division Two of the Kent League. A season later they won the division but decided against promotion, and reverted to Amateur status. Having played in both the Kent League and Kent Amateur League in 1938–39, they decided to limit play to amateur competition the following season, however this was interrupted by World War II.

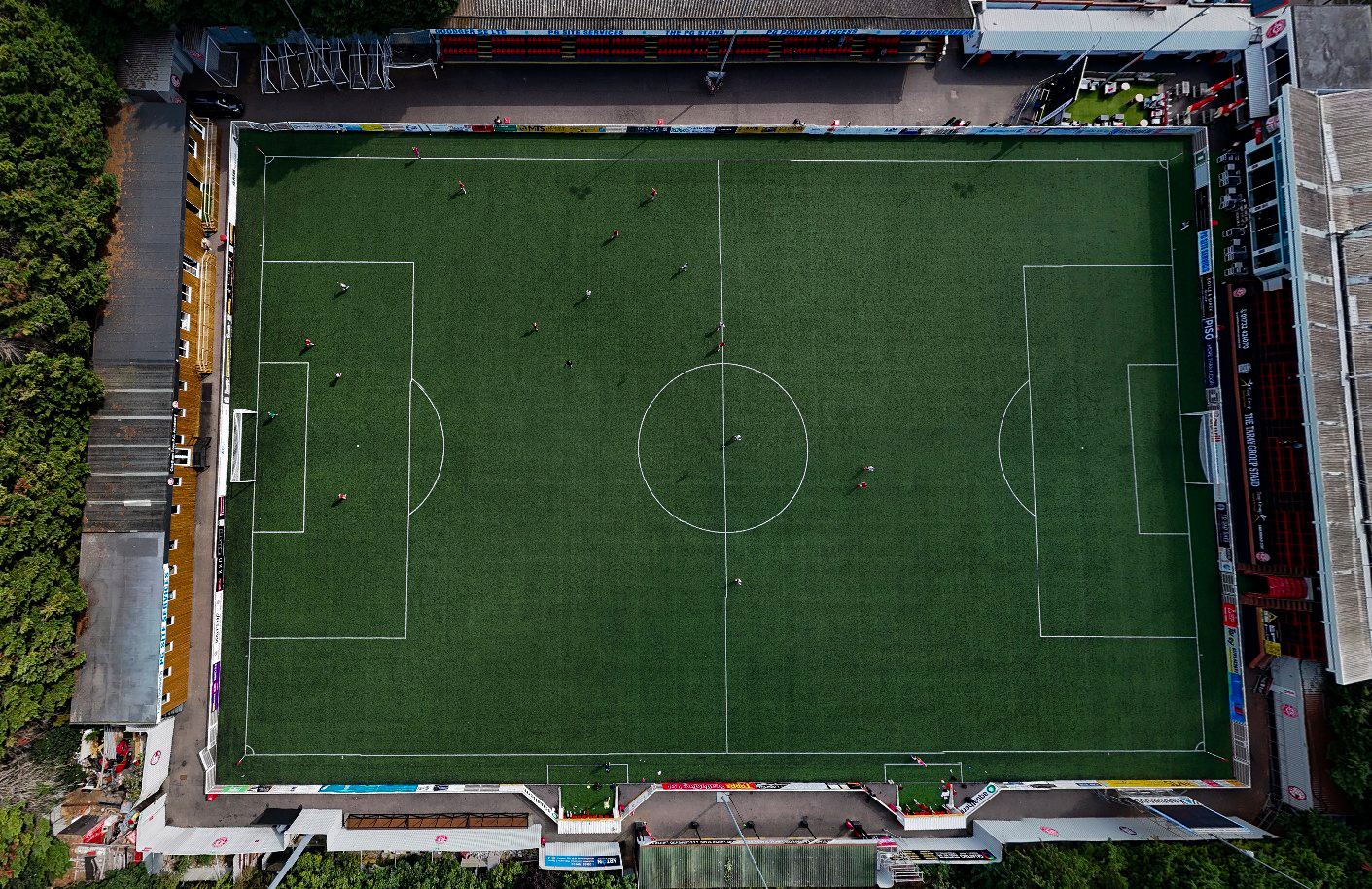
Aerial view of the Bauvill Stadium

After the War Chatham won the Kent Amateur League Premier Division in 1946–47, which was to be their last honour under that name. On 7 January 1947 they merged with Shorts F.C., with the amalgamated club taking the name Chatham Town at the request of the local council. They then joined Division One of the Kent League for the 1947–48 season and stayed there until 1959, when the Kent league disbanded. For the 1959–60 season they joined as a founding member of the Aetolian League. The following year they captured the League Championship and the Aetolian League Cup Final. In 1964–65 the Aetolian League merged with the London League to form the Greater London League, and the club moved to the Metropolitan League. Four Seasons later they returned to the Kent League when it was reformed in 1968.

They remained in the Kent League until 1983, when they joined the Southern League. During the 15-year period in the Kent league they won the league 4 times and won the league and cup double in both the 1971–72 and 1977–78 seasons. The club changed its name in 1974 for 5 years to Medway F.C., at the request of the local council, returning to Chatham Town in 1979.

The club stayed in the Southern League until 1988, when having failed to gain re-election they were relegated to the Kent League; there were financial troubles. They experienced crowds, as had other poorly supported clubs, in double figures; Kent League days had healthier attendance with more local competition. Upon returning to the Kent League, the club struggled, until former player John Adams became First Team manager. He guided the club to the Third Qualifying Round of the F.A. Cup in 1993–94, the Final of the Kent Senior Trophy in 1995–96 and finished among the top three of the Kent League for three successive seasons. However he was dismissed by the club following a bad start to the 1996–97 season.

In 1997 the club was forced to briefly return to Great Lines when a new drainage system saw parts of the Maidstone Road pitch collapse. The Kent League allowed them to use the Garrison Ground in Kings Bastian for several matches, before they could arrange a brief ground-share with Gillingham at Priestfield Stadium. The club returned home for the 1998–99 season under new manager Carl Laraman, with results improving immediately; however he left in January of that year to take up a coaching position at Charlton Athletic. His assistant, Steve Hearn, was appointed player-manager and saw the club become Kent League Champions and promoted to the Southern League, in 2000–01. At the end of the first season in the league Steve Hearn resigned due to poor results and was replaced by his assistant Peter Coupland. However Peter Coupland only lasted until the middle of the 2003–04 season (with the club looking likely to be relegated) with Clive Walker replacing him, and steering the club to a mid table finish.

The league was restructured for the 2004–05 season and saw Chatham being placed in the Southern League Eastern Division. During this campaign Clive Walker return to his old club Dover Athletic and his assistant Steve Binks was appointed manager. Since that season the club has moved between the Isthmian League North and South Divisions with regular mid table positions. For the 2006–07 season the club saw former player Phil Miles take over as Manager; however this lasted until December that season when he had to stand down due to work commitments with Steve Binks taking over the job again. During this season the club achieved the FA Charter Standard award. Between the seasons 2006–07 and 2007–08 the club played in Isthmian League Division 1 South. The club played in Isthmian League Division 1 North in the season 2008–09, but transferred the following season to Division 1 South.

The Season 2010–11 saw a management change with Paul Foley and his assistant Mark Newson move from VCD Athletic. In this season, the club played in Isthmian League Division 1 South finishing 21st, a relegation place. However, the club was reprieved from relegation and instead were transferred for the next season to Isthmian League Division 1 North. The management team of Foley and Newson lasted until the end of that season when Player Manager Kevin Watson took over at first in a caretaker role and then as Manager for the 2011–12 season.

Between the seasons 2011–12 and 2014–15, the club played without notable success in Isthmian League Division 1 North. From the start of season 2015–16, the club has played in Isthmian League Division 1 South. The club were relegated at the end of the 2016–17 season.

On 9 April 2022, following a 10–1 defeat of Erith & Belvedere, Chatham secured promotion back to the Isthmian League. Despite finishing on 100 points and scoring 122 goals, Chatham finished the season in second place behind Sheppey United. The following season, the club achieved back-to-back promotions when they were crowned Champions of the Isthmian League South East Division. Chasing a third consecutive promotion, Chatham finished second to Hornchurch, winning the Velocity Cup.

== Crest and colours ==
The club's current crest, features mostly red with a ship, was launched in 2019. The club stated that it "embraced our rich naval heritage which stems back to our forming in 1882".

Chatham typically play in a red home shirt with black detailing. Past colours include red and blue 1" hoops (presumably taken from the Royal Engineers A.F.C.) (1882–83, 1887–89, 1890–92), red and black (1883–85), white with navy knickers (1889–90), red and blue (1895–96), and chocolate and blue (1911–12).

== Ground ==
Chatham Town play their home games at The Bauvill Stadium, Maidstone Road, Chatham, Kent, ME4 6LR.

== Players ==
=== Current squad ===
As of 1 July 2026

Note: Flags indicate national team as defined under FIFA eligibility rules; some limited exceptions apply. Players may hold more than one non-FIFA nationality.

No.	Pos.	Nation	Player
1	GK	ENG	Nathan Harvey
2	DF	ENG	Oliver Evans
3	DF	ENG	Kasim Aidoo
4	MF	ENG	Jordy Robins
5	DF	ENG	Reece Butler
6	DF	ENG	Sid Nelson
7	FW	ENG	Sam Folarin
8	MF	ENG	Kian Moynes
10	MF	ENG	Sam Sene-Richardson
12	MF	ENG	Kian Garlinge
14	MF	ENG	Adam Leathers
15	DF	ENG	Simon Cooper
16	MF	ENG	Lewis Chambers
18	MF	ENG	Stanley Oldfield

No.	Pos.	Nation	Player
19	FW	ENG	Tope Fadahunsi
20	FW	ENG	Kofi Anokye-Boadi
23	DF	ENG	Dapo Olugbodi
25	GK	IRL	Henry Molyneux
26	DF	ENG	Alex Giles
28	FW	ENG	Ben Allen
—	GK	ENG	Josh Fowler
—	DF	ENG	Elliott Wenham
—	MF	ENG	Josh Chambers
—	DF	ENG	Oliver Hobden
—		ENG	Isaac Hadlow
—		ENG	Kelvin Boissiere
—		ENG	Louie Belsham

== Club honours ==
League

- Isthmian League South East Division:
  - Champions: 2022–23
- Southern Counties East League Premier Division:
  - Runners-up: 2021–22
- Kent League Premier Division :
  - Winners (10 Times): 1894–95, 1903–04, 1904–05, 1924–25, 1926–27 1971–72, 1973–74, 1976–77, 1979–80, 2000–01
  - Runners-up: 1902–03, 1925–26, 1974–75, 1980–81, 1994–95
- Aetolian League:
  - Winners: 1963–64
  - Runners-up: 1962–63
- Kent Amateur League:
  - Winners: 1946–47
- Kent League – Division Two:
  - Winners: 1934–35
- Thames and Medway Combination:
  - Winners: 1896–97, 1903–04, 1904–05, 1919–20, 1923–24

Cup

- Alan Turvey Trophy
  - Winners 2023–24
  - Runners-up: 2024-25
- Southern Counties East League Challenge Cup:
  - Winners 2018–19
- Kent Senior Cup:
  - Winners: 1888–89, 1894–95, 1904–05, 1910–11, 1918–19
  - Runners-up: 1892-93, 1909-10, 1911-12, 2022-23
- Kent Senior Trophy:
  - Winners 2018–19
- Kent League cup:
  - Winners: 1971–72, 1976–77
  - Runners-up: 1969–70, 1973–74, 1979–80
- Aetolian League Cup:
  - Winners: 1962–63
  - Runners-up: 1959–60, 1960–61, 1961–62, 1963–64
- Eastern Professional Floodlight Cup:
  - Winners: 1980–81
- Aetolian/London League Cup:
  - Winners: 1963–64
- Aetolian League Benevolent Cup:
  - Winners: 1963–64
  - Runners-up: 1995–96, 1999–00
- Kent Senior Shield:
  - Winners: 1919–20
- Kent Badge:
  - Winners: 1885–86, 1886–87, 1887–88
- Chatham & District Charity Cup:
  - Winners: 1891–92, 1894–95, 1898–99, 1902–03, 1904–05, 1910–11, 1913–14, 1918–19
  - Runners-up: 1912–13
- UK Insulations Supplies Charity Cup:
  - Winners: 1999–00

== Club records ==
- Best league position: 3rd in Southern League, 1896–97
- Best FA Cup performance: Quarter-finals, 1888–89
- Best FA Trophy performance: 5th round, 2025–26
- Best FA Vase performance: 4th round, 2019–20
