= Tyla Dickinson =

English footballer (born 2001)

Personal information
- Date of birth: 3 April 2001 (age 25)
- Position: Goalkeeper

Youth career
- Tottenham Hotspur
- 2012–2021: Queens Park Rangers

Senior career*
Years	Team	Apps	(Gls)
2018–2021	Queens Park Rangers	0	(0)
2018–2019	→ Stotfold (loan)	9	(0)
2019	→ Beaconsfield Town (loan)		
2019	→ Hendon (loan)	1	(0)
2019	→ Waltham Abbey (loan)		
2020	→ Northwood (loan)	3	(0)
2021–2023	Wycombe Wanderers	4	(0)
2021	→ Hayes & Yeading United (loan)	7	(0)
2022	→ Hungerford Town (loan)	5	(0)
2023	→ Sutton United (loan)	0	(0)
- * Club domestic league appearances and goals as of 21:34, 6 January 2023 (UTC)

Tyla Dickinson (born 3 April 2001) is an English professional footballer who plays as a goalkeeper.

== Career ==
Dickinson began his career with Tottenham Hotspur, moving to Queens Park Rangers in 2012. Whilst with QPR he spent loan spells at Stotfold, Beaconsfield Town, Hendon, Waltham Abbey, and Northwood.

He signed a one-year contract with Wycombe Wanderers in August 2021. He moved on loan to Hayes & Yeading United in October 2021.

Dickinson made his league debut for Wycombe on 30 July 2022, at home against Burton Albion. In October 2022 he moved on loan to Hungerford Town.

In January 2023 he signed on loan for Sutton United. He was released by Wycombe at the end of the 2022–23 season.
