= Adam Leathers =

English footballer (born 2001)

Personal information
- Full name: Adam James Leathers
- Date of birth: 14 November 2001 (age 24)
- Place of birth: Nuneaton, England
- Position: Midfielder

Team information
- Current team: Chatham Town

Youth career
- –2021: Leicester City

Senior career*
| Years | Team | Apps | (Gls) |
| 2021–2023 | Wycombe Wanderers | 1 | (0) |
| 2022 | → Dulwich Hamlet (loan) | 1 | (0) |
| 2022–2023 | → Hampton & Richmond Borough (loan) | 3 | (0) |
| 2023 | → Maidenhead United (loan) | 10 | (0) |
| 2023–2024 | Billericay Town | 24 | (2) |
| 2024–2025 | Aveley | 29 | (0) |
| 2025– | Chatham Town | 34 | (3) |
- * Club domestic league appearances and goals as of 09:22, 30 April 2026 (UTC)

Adam James Leathers (born 14 November 2001) is an English professional footballer who plays as a midfielder for Isthmian League Premier Division club Chatham Town.

== Career ==
Leathers began his career with Leicester City as a youth player, where he was a regular in the Under-18 Premier League. His first senior match came on 10 November 2020 against Grimsby Town in the EFL Trophy. At the end of the 2021–22 season, Leathers was released by the club.

Leathers joined Wycombe Wanderers in September 2021. He made his professional debut on 9 November 2021 in a 5–0 loss against Burton Albion in the EFL Trophy first round. In January 2022, he moved on loan to Dulwich Hamlet. On 18 November 2022, Leathers joined National League South side Hampton & Richmond Borough on a 28-day loan deal. On 31 January 2023, he joined National League club Maidenhead United until the end of the season on loan.

In June 2025, Leathers joined Isthmian League Premier Division side Chatham Town.

== Career statistics ==
As of match played 29 April 2026

Appearances and goals by club, season and competition
| Club | Season | League | | | FA Cup | | League Cup | | Other | | Total | |
| Club | Season | Division | Apps | Goals | Apps | Goals | Apps | Goals | Apps | Goals | Apps | Goals |
|---|---|---|---|---|---|---|---|---|---|---|---|---|
| Leicester City U21 | 2020–21 | | 0 | 0 | 0 | 0 | 0 | 0 | 1 (Note: Appearances in the EFL Trophy) | 0 | 1 | 0 |
| Wycombe Wanderers | 2021–22 | League One | 0 | 0 | 0 | 0 | 0 | 0 | 1 | 0 | 1 | 0 |
| Wycombe Wanderers | 2022–23 | League One | 1 | 0 | 0 | 0 | 1 | 0 | 3 | 0 | 5 | 0 |
| Wycombe Wanderers | Total | | 1 | 0 | 0 | 0 | 1 | 0 | 4 | 0 | 6 | 0 |
| Dulwich Hamlet (loan) | 2021–22 | National League South | 1 | 0 | 0 | 0 | 0 | 0 | 0 | 0 | 1 | 0 |
| Hampton & Richmond Borough (loan) | 2022–23 | National League South | 3 | 0 | 0 | 0 | 0 | 0 | 1 (Note: Appearances in the FA Trophy) | 0 | 4 | 0 |
| Maidenhead United (loan) | 2022–23 | National League | 10 | 0 | 0 | 0 | 0 | 0 | 0 | 0 | 10 | 0 |
| Billericay Town | 2023–24 | Isthmian League Premier Division | 24 | 2 | 4 | 0 | — | | 7 (Note: Four appearances in FA Trophy, one appearance in Essex Senior Cup, two appearances in Alan Turvey Trophy) | 0 | 35 | 2 |
| Aveley | 2024–25 | National League South | 29 | 0 | 1 | 0 | — | | 0 | 0 | 30 | 0 |
| Chatham Town | 2025–26 | Isthmian League Premier Division | 34 | 3 | 5 | 0 | — | | 11 (Note: Five appearances in FA Trophy, three appearances in Kent Senior Cup, two appearances in Alan Turvey Trophy, one appearance in the Isthmian League Premier Division play-offs) | 0 | 50 | 3 |
| Career total | | | 102 | 5 | 10 | 0 | 1 | 0 | 24 | 0 | 137 | 5 |
