= Marion Leathers Kuntz =

American philosopher and academic

Marion Leathers Kuntz (September 6, 1924 – July 10, 2010) was the Regents Professor of Classics at Georgia State University, a researcher in the history of Renaissance thought.

She was born to Lucille (née Parks) and Otto Asa Leathers.

She authored the first English translation of Jean Bodin's Colloquium heptaplomeres de rerum sublimium arcanis abditis (Colloquium of the Seven about Secrets of the Sublime) in 1975.

Her other works include:

- Guillaume Postel: Prophet of the Restitution of All Things (1981)
- Venice, Myth and Utopian Thought in the Sixteenth Century: Bodin, Postel and the Virgin of Venice. Variorum Collected Studies Series (1999)
- The Anointment of Dionisio: Prophecy and Politics in Renaissance Italy (2001)

There are others, in total over 35 book chapters and 28 essays and articles.
