= Roland Leather =

English cricketer

Roland Sutcliffe Leather (17 August 1880 – 3 January 1913) was an English amateur first-class cricketer, who played one match for Yorkshire County Cricket Club in 1906, against the West Indian tourists at St George's Road Cricket Ground, Harrogate. he also played for the Yorkshire Second XI from 1904 to 1906.

Born in Kirkstall, Leeds, Yorkshire, England, Leather was a right-handed opening batsman, he scored 5 and 14 as Yorkshire were beaten by 262 runs, despite a second innings century from David Denton. Richard Ollivierre took 11 wickets for the tourists, while Percy Goodman scored an unbeaten century in the same game.

Leather died in January 1913 in Heliopolis, Cairo, Egypt, aged 32.
