= CyberCell =

The CyberCell database
Content
- Description: A database providing quantitative genomic, proteomic, and metabolomic data of E. coli.
- Data types captured: Gene and protein data; functional or ontological information; gene position and protein location; protein, metabolite and RNA expression levels; protein interaction and protein stoichiometry information; enzyme rate constants; metabolite structures, reactions and pathways; lists of cofactors and ligands; other molecular data.

Contact
- Research center: University of Alberta
- Laboratory: David S. Wishart

Access
- Website: http://ccdb.wishartlab.com/CCDB/

Miscellaneous
- Data release frequency: Last updated on 2006

The CyberCell Database (CCDB) is a freely available, web-accessible database that provides quantitative genomic, proteomic as well metabolomic data on Escherichia coli. Escherichia coli (strain K12) is perhaps the best-studied bacterium on the planet and has been the organism of choice for several international efforts in cell simulation. These cell simulation efforts require up-to-date web-accessible resources that provide comprehensive, non-redundant, and quantitative data on this bacterium. The intent of CCDB is to facilitate the collection, revision, coordination and storage of the key information required for in silico E. coli simulation.

== Content ==
The CCDB contains four different browsable databases providing gene/protein information (CCDB), 3D protein structure data (CC3D), tRNA and rRNA information (CCRD), and metabolite data (CCMD), respectively. The data has been collected or generated using various sources and tools, including textbooks, published scientific articles, electronic databases, in house software as well as web-based programs. Each database exists as a re-formattable, easily browsed synoptic table which allows users to casually scroll through the different databases. Detailed information about each gene, protein, RNA, 3D structure or metabolite may be obtained by clicking on the ‘ColiCard’ on the left column. Every card contains more than 60 fields concerning all aspects of the sequence, function or structure of a given molecule as well as hyperlinks to other sources of information such as EcoGene and EcoCyc, scientific abstracts, and interactive applets to view structures or chromosomal maps. One of the more attractive characteristics of CCDB is its ability to support database searching and sorting. It offers utilities for local BLAST searches, Boolean text searches, chemical structure searches, and relational database extraction. The results of the latter can be exported in various formats including HTML, Excel and a circular chromosome applet view. One of the most popular features in the CCDB are its “E. coli Statistics” pages (available through the “Stats” link at the top of the CCDB home page). This link provides a rich source of information about the content, dimensions and physical-chemical characteristics of the E. coli cell.

== Community annotation ==
In order to facilitate the correction and submission of data, the CyberCell database allows users to electronically edit or update ‘ColiCards’. These modifications are permanently added only after they have been reviewed and accepted by an archivist. In addition to modifications by users, CCDB also performs automated self-updating operations on a regular basis, which keeps the database up-to-date.

== Scope and Access ==
All data in the CCDB is non-proprietary or is derived from a non-proprietary source. It is freely accessible and available to anyone. In addition, nearly every data item is fully traceable and explicitly referenced to the original source. CCDB data is available through a public web interface and downloads.

== See also ==
- E.coli
- BLAST
