= Jaiden Bartolo =

Gibraltarian footballer (born 2006)

Personal information
- Full name: Jaiden Kamil Bartolo
- Date of birth: 10 February 2006 (age 20)
- Place of birth: Slough, England
- Height: 6 ft 0 in (1.83 m)
- Position: Forward

Team information
- Current team: Salisbury
- Number: 29

Youth career
- 2011–2013: Glacis United
- 2013–2015: Lions Gibraltar
- 2015–2016: Lincoln Red Imps
- 2016–2017: Atlético Zabal
- 2017–2018: Calderón
- 2018–2019: San Roque
- 2019: Peña Madridista Linense
- 2019: Balón Linense
- 2019–2020: Taraguilla
- 2020–2023: Manchester 62

Senior career*
Years	Team	Apps	(Gls)
2022–2023	Manchester 62	8	(5)
2023–2024	Wealdstone	0	(0)
2023	→ Amersham Town (loan)	0	(0)
2024–2026	Wycombe Wanderers	2	(0)
2024–2025	→ Weymouth (loan)	11	(1)
2025	→ Slough Town (loan)	5	(0)
2025	→ Chesham United (loan)	9	(1)
2026	→ AFC Totton (loan)	5	(0)
2026	AFC Totton	11	(2)
2026–	Salisbury	14	(4)

International career^{‡}
2022	Gibraltar U16	3	(2)
2021–2022	Gibraltar U17	9	(6)
2023	Gibraltar U19	4	(0)
2023–	Gibraltar U21	7	(0)
2024–	Gibraltar	17	(0)
- * Club domestic league appearances and goals as of 21 November 2026 ‡ National team caps and goals as of 5 October 2026

Jaiden Kamil Bartolo (born 10 February 2006) is a footballer who plays as a forward for National League South club Salisbury. Born in England, he represents Gibraltar at international level.

== Club career ==
Bartolo spent his youth playing for various youth teams in Spain, for teams around Cádiz and La Línea de la Concepción just across the border from Gibraltar, before joining Manchester 62. He made his debut for their Gibraltar Intermediate League under-23 team on his 16th birthday, scoring 4 goals as a substitute in a 7–4 win against Lynx under-23. 2 days later, on 12 February 2022, he scored on his first team debut for the Red Devils of Gibraltar, in a 2–0 win against College 1975. He made a further 5 appearances, including a hat-trick against Lynx, as his side won the GFA Challenge Trophy.

The next season was spent largely attending trials in the UK, though he returned over winter to play twice for Manchester 62. After reportedly attracting interest from Watford, these trials eventually resulted in a move to Wealdstone in July 2023, to play for their academy. There, his form caught the eye and saw him regularly train with the senior team from August. After scoring 16 goals in 6 games for their under-19 team and 8 goals in 4 games for their under-23 team, on 18 December 2023 it was announced that Bartolo had been offered professional terms and been promoted to the Stones first team, appearing on the bench for the first time on 13 January 2024 in the FA Trophy match against Chelmsford City. He left the Stones at the end of the season.

On 5 June 2024, it was announced that Bartolo had signed for EFL League One side Wycombe Wanderers, with his move to the Chairboys going through on 1 July. He was given the number 29 later that month, which was vacated by his compatriot Tjay De Barr the previous season. On 19 October 2024 he joined National League South side Weymouth, playing that same day in a 1–1 draw with Chesham United. His loan was then extended until 7 January. On 14 March 2025, he was loaned to Slough Town in the same league, until the end of the season.

In October 2025, after scoring in two friendlies as a trialist, Bartolo joined Chesham United on an initial one month loan. After being extended to the end of December, he went on loan again in January 2026, this time to AFC Totton for the rest of the season. On 6 March, he made his move permanent, though he moved once again that summer to join Salisbury. He scored a hat-trick on his debut for the Whites on 8 August 2026.

== International career ==
Born in England to parents of Sri Lankan and Maltese descent and raised in Gibraltar, Bartolo is eligible to represent England, Sri Lanka, Malta and Gibraltar. He made his debut for Gibraltar under-17 on 10 September 2021, scoring in a 2–1 victory over Faroe Islands. He captained them for the first time on 25 August 2022 in a friendly against Liechtenstein, scoring a hat-trick in an 8–2 victory - a record win for Gibraltar at any level since joining UEFA in 2013. His under-21 debut came on 15 June 2023, in a 3–1 defeat to Moldova after playing in an unofficial friendly against Iraq under-20 3 months prior.

He received his first call up to the senior team in March 2022's preliminary squad, but was left out of the final squad. He eventually made his full international debut on 26 March 2024, in a 1–0 defeat to Lithuania.

== Career statistics ==
=== Club ===
As of match played on 21 November 2026

Club statistics
Club	Season	League			National cup (Note: Includes Rock Cup, FA Cup)		League cup (Note: Includes EFL Cup)		Other		Total	
Club	Season	Division	Apps	Goals	Apps	Goals	Apps	Goals	Apps	Goals	Apps	Goals
Manchester 62	2021–22	Gibraltar Football League	6	5	0	0	—		—		6	5
Manchester 62	2022–23	Gibraltar Football League	2	0	0	0	—		—		2	0
Manchester 62	Total		8	5	0	0	—		—		8	5
Wealdstone	2023–24	National League	0	0	0	0	—		0	0	0	0
Wycombe Wanderers	2024–25	League One	2	0	0	0	0	0	2 (Note: Appearances in EFL Trophy)	0	4	0
Wycombe Wanderers	2025–26	League One	0	0	0	0	1	0	0	0	1	0
Wycombe Wanderers	Total		2	0	0	0	1	0	2	0	5	0
Weymouth (loan)	2024–25	National League South	11	1	0	0	—		2 (Note: Appearances in FA Trophy)	0	13	1
Slough Town (loan)	2024–25	National League South	5	0	0	0	—		0	0	5	0
Chesham United (loan)	2025–26	National League South	9	1	0	0	—		0	0	9	1
AFC Totton	2025–26 (Note: Part of this season was spent on loan from Wycombe Wanderers.)	National League South	16	2	0	0	—		0	0	16	2
Salisbury	2026–27	National League South	14	4	3	3	—		1	1	18	8
Career total			65	13	3	3	1	0	5	1	74	17

=== International ===
As of match played 5 October 2026

Appearances and goals by national team and year
National team	Year	Apps	Goals
Gibraltar U16
Gibraltar U16	2022	3	2
Total		3	2
Gibraltar U17
Gibraltar U17	2021	5	2
Gibraltar U17	2022	4	4
Total		9	6
Gibraltar U19
Gibraltar U19	2023	4	0
Total		4	0
Gibraltar U21
Gibraltar U21	2023	5	0
Gibraltar U21	2024	0	0
Gibraltar U21	2025	2	0
Total		7	0
Gibraltar
Gibraltar	2024	7	0
Gibraltar	2025	6	0
Gibraltar	2026	4	0
Total		17	0

== Honours ==
Manchester 62

- GFA Challenge Trophy: 2021–22

== Personal life ==
Bartolo was born in Slough in the United Kingdom, but moved to Gibraltar at the age of 2 when his parents relocated. His younger brother, Kai, is also a footballer who played alongside him at Manchester 62 and Wealdstone's academies, and currently plays for Amersham Town.
