= Donnell McNeilly =

English footballer (born 2005)

Personal information
- Full name: Donnell Ocarriel McNeilly
- Date of birth: 30 October 2005 (age 21)
- Place of birth: London, England
- Height: 1.81 m (5 ft 11 in)
- Position: Forward

Team information
- Current team: AFC Wimbledon (on loan from Nottingham Forest)
- Number: 19

Youth career
- 2017–2025: Chelsea
- 2025–: Nottingham Forest

Senior career*
Years	Team	Apps	(Gls)
2025–	Nottingham Forest	0	(0)
2025–2026	→ Wycombe Wanderers (loan)	10	(0)
2026–	→ AFC Wimbledon (loan)	1	(0)
- * Club domestic league appearances and goals as of 19:35, 30 August 2026 (UTC)

Donnell Ocarriel McNeilly (born 30 October 2005) is an English professional footballer who plays as a forward for AFC Wimbledon on loan from Premier League club Nottingham Forest.

== Club career ==
Born in London, McNeilly joined Chelsea's academy as an under-12 from grassroots football. In November 2022, he signed his first professional contract with the club, valid until June 2025.

In the 2021–22 season, McNeilly was the top goalscorer for the Chelsea under-16s, a feat he repeated the following season with the under-18s, netting eleven goals. In the 2023–24 season, McNeilly was promoted to the under-21 team, but spent most of his season with the under-18s. Of all the Chelsea players, aged 16 and above, representing the senior men's, women's and academy sides, McNeilly scored the most goals for the club during the 2023–24 campaign. McNeilly departed the club in June 2025 after his contract expired, having turned down an offer for a new deal.

On 1 September 2025, McNeilly signed a three-year deal with Premier League side Nottingham Forest's academy, before immediately been loaned to EFL League One side Wycombe Wanderers for the remainder of the season. On 5 January 2026, McNeilly returned to his parent club as his loan spell was terminated early.

On 29 August 2026, McNeilly joined EFL League One side AFC Wimbledon on a season-long loan.

== Career statistics ==
As of match played 23 September 2025

Appearances and goals by club, season and competition
Club	Season	League			FA Cup		EFL Cup		Continental		Other		Total	
Club	Season	Division	Apps	Goals	Apps	Goals	Apps	Goals	Apps	Goals	Apps	Goals	Apps	Goals
Chelsea U21	2022–23	—			—		—		—		1 (Note: Appearances in EFL Trophy)	0	1	0
Chelsea U21	2023–24	—			—		—		—		3	0	3	0
Chelsea U21	2024–25	—			—		—		—		1	1	1	1
Chelsea U21	Total		0	0	0	0	0	0	0	0	5	1	5	1
Nottingham Forest	2025–26	Premier League	0	0	—		0	0	0	0	—		0	0
Wycombe Wanderers (loan)	2025–26	EFL League One	1	0	—		1	1	—		—		2	1
Career total			1	0	0	0	1	1	0	0	5	1	7	2
