= 2025–26 Wycombe Wanderers F.C. season =

139th season in existence of Wycombe Wanderers FC

Wycombe Wanderers
2025–26 season
- Owner: Blue Ocean Partners II Ltd (90%); Wycombe Wanderers Supporters Group (10%)
- Chairman: Dan Rice (Interim)
- Head Coach: Mike Dodds (until 18 September); Michael Duff (from 18 September)
- Stadium: Adams Park
- League One: 11th
- FA Cup: Second round
- EFL Cup: Fourth round
- EFL Trophy: Group stage
- Berks & Bucks Senior Cup: Winners
- Top goalscorer: League: Fred Onyedinma (10); All: Cauley Woodrow (12)
- Highest home attendance: 7,872 vs. Fulham; 28 October 2025
- Lowest home attendance: 569 vs. Fulham U21; 7 October 2025
- Average home league attendance: 5,550
- Biggest win: 4-0 (twice) (vs. Doncaster Rovers, 7 February 2026) (vs. Port Vale, 28 March 2026)
- Biggest defeat: 4-0 (twice) (vs. Exeter City, 6 December 2025) (vs. Luton Town, 26 December 2025)
Home colours	Away colours	Third colours

The 2025–26 season was the 139th season in the history of Wycombe Wanderers Football Club and their fifth consecutive season in League One. In addition to the domestic league, the club would also participate in the FA Cup, the EFL Cup, the EFL Trophy.

Wycombe Wanderers' academy is set to return for the first time since 2011–12 as they are set to compete in the EFL Youth Alliance South, FA Youth Cup and the Berks & Bucks FA Senior Cup.

== Managerial changes ==
On 18 September, Mike Dodds was relieved from his duties as Head Coach after 31 games in charge and a 29.03% win ratio. On the same day, Michael Duff was appointed as the new Head Coach.

== Transfers and contracts ==
=== In ===
Date	Pos.	Player	From	Fee	Ref.
20 June 2025	CAM	(Guinea-Bissau) Junior Quitirna	(England) Crawley Town	Undisclosed	
26 June 2025	CB	(England) Taylor Allen	(England) Walsall	Undisclosed	
27 June 2025	CF	(Switzerland) Bradley Fink	(Switzerland) FC Basel	Undisclosed	
28 June 2025	GK	(Netherlands) Mikki Van Sas	(Netherlands) Feyenoord	Undisclosed	
1 July 2025 (Note: The transfer was announced on 16 June, and would become official on July 1 once his St Mirren contract had expired)	CM	(Northern Ireland) Caolan Boyd-Munce	(Scotland) St Mirren	Free	
1 July 2025 (Note: The transfer was announced on 14 June, and would become official on July 1 once his Motherwell contract had expired)	CB	(Republic of Ireland) Dan Casey	(Scotland) Motherwell	Free	
1 July 2025 (Note: The transfer was announced on 13 June, and would become official on July 1 once his AFC Wimbledon contract had expired)	RW	(England) James Tilley	(England) AFC Wimbledon	Free	
14 July 2025	CAM	(Scotland) Ewan Henderson	(Belgium) Beerschot	Undisclosed	
15 July 2025	CM	(Republic of Ireland) Jamie Mullins	(England) Brighton & Hove Albion	Undisclosed	
30 July 2025	GK	(England) Stuart Moore	(England) Morecambe	Free	
6 August 2025	CB	(England) Connor Taylor	(England) Bristol Rovers	Undisclosed	
24 October 2025	CB	(England) Josh Gidaree	(England) Wolverhampton Wanderers	Free	
29 January 2026	CM	(England) Aaron Morley	(England) Bolton Wanderers	£750,000 (Note: Rising to £1,000,000 with future contingencies)	
2 February 2026	LW	(Angola) André Vidigal	(England) Stoke City	Free	
12 February 2026	CM	(England) Joseph McCallum	(England) Coventry City	Free Transfer	

=== Out ===
Date	Pos.	Player	To	Fee	Ref.
11 July 2025	CDM	(England) Tyreeq Bakinson	(England) Leyton Orient	Undisclosed	
11 July 2025	RB	(England) Jasper Pattenden	(England) Stevenage	Free transfer	
13 August 2025	CF	(Ivory Coast) Richard Kone	(England) Queens Park Rangers	£2,750,000	
22 August 2025	CDM	(England) Matt Butcher	(England) Salford City	Free transfer	
1 September 2025	CB	(England) Alex Hartridge	(England) Burton Albion	Undisclosed	
1 September 2025	CF	(Nigeria) Daniel Udoh	(England) Salford City	£325,000	
3 January 2026	LB	(England) Ryan Cole	(England) Bedford Town	Free transfer	
8 January 2026	CM	(Denmark) Magnus Westergaard	(Norway) Vålerenga	Undisclosed	
3 February 2026	RW	(England) Brody Peart	(England) Aldershot Town	Free Transfer	
6 March 2026	CF	(Gibraltar) Jaiden Bartolo	(England) AFC Totton	Free Transfer	

Income: ▲ ~ £3,075,000

=== Loaned in ===
Date	Pos.	Player	From	Date until	Ref.
6 August 2025	DM	(England) George Abbott	(England) Tottenham Hotspur	5 January 2026 (Note: On 5 January, Abbott was recalled from his season-long from Tottenham)	
1 September 2025	LW	(England) Sam Bell	(England) Bristol City	1 January 2026 (Note: On 1 January, Bell was recalled from his season-long from Bristol City)	
1 September 2025	RB	(Wales) Niall Huggins	(England) Sunderland	31 May 2026	
1 September 2025	CF	(England) Donnell McNeilly	(England) Nottingham Forest	5 January 2026 (Note: On 5 January, McNeilly was recalled from his season-long from Nottingham Forest)	
1 September 2025	CF	(England) Cauley Woodrow	(England) Luton Town	31 May 2026	
19 January 2026	CAM	(Wales) Luke Harris	(England) Fulham	31 May 2026	
30 January 2026	CF	(England) Nathan Lowe	(England) Stoke City	31 May 2026	

=== Loaned out ===
Date	Pos.	Player	To	Date until	Ref.
14 July 2025	RW	(England) Brody Peart	(England) Tonbridge Angels	1 January 2026	
24 July 2025	GK	(England) Shamal George	(Scotland) St Mirren	31 May 2026	
27 July 2025	CB	(England) Jack Matton	(England) Tonbridge Angels	1 January 2026	
8 August 2025	LW	(England) James Berry	(England) Chesterfield	31 May 2026	
9 September 2025	GK	(Kosovo) Laurence Shala	(England) Uxbridge	7 October 2025	
3 October 2025	CF	(Gibraltar) Jaiden Bartolo	(England) Chesham United	3 January 2026 (Note: On 31 October, Bartolo's loan at Chesham was extended until January)	
7 January 2026	GK	(Kosovo) Laurence Shala	(England) Tonbridge Angels	31 January 2026	
20 January 2026	CF	(Gibraltar) Jaiden Bartolo	(England) AFC Totton	6 March 2026 (Note: On 6 March, Bartolo joined AFC Totton on a permanent basis)	
20 January 2026	RW	(England) James Tilley	(England) AFC Wimbledon	31 May 2026	
31 January 2026	RB	(England) Fin Back	(England) Colchester United	31 May 2026	
13 February 2026	CB	(England) Declan Skura	(England) Yeovil Town	13 March 2026 (Note: On 13 March, Skura was recalled from his loan spell at Yeovil Town)	
14 February 2026	CB	(England) Jack Matton	(England) Hanwell Town	31 May 2026 (Note: On 12 March, Matton's loan at Hanwell Town was extended until the end of the season)	

=== Released / out of contract ===
Date	Pos.	Player	Subsequent club	Join date	Ref.
30 June 2025	CM	(England) Taylor Clark	(England) Chelmsford City	1 July 2025	
30 June 2025	CF	(England) Brandon Hanlan	(England) Doncaster Rovers	1 July 2025	
30 June 2025	CB	(Wales) Joe Low	(England) Huddersfield Town	1 July 2025	
30 June 2025	GK	(Argentina) Franco Ravizzoli	(England) Blackpool	1 July 2025	
30 June 2025	AM	(England) Christie Ward	(England) AFC Totton	1 July 2025	
30 June 2025	CB	(England) Luca Woodhouse	(England) Exeter City	1 July 2025	
30 June 2025	CF	(Wales) Sam Vokes	(England) Gillingham	1 July 2025	
30 June 2025	LW	(Democratic Republic of the Congo) Beryly Lubala	(England) Stevenage	11 July 2025	
30 June 2025	LM	(England) Adam Reach	(England) Lincoln City	1 September 2025	
30 June 2025	CM	(England) Jack Young	(England) Farnborough	20 September 2025	
30 June 2025	LW	(Republic of Ireland) Kieran Sadlier	(United States) Sporting JAX	6 January 2026	
28 August 2025	CB	(England) Ryan Tafazolli	(England) Swindon Town	28 August 2025	
31 August 2025	RW	(Jamaica) Garath McCleary	(England) Gillingham	1 September 2025	

=== New contract ===
Date	Pos.	Player	Contracted until	Ref.
19 June 2025	RB	(England) Fin Back	Undisclosed	
19 June 2025	CF	(England) Jahiem Dotse	Undisclosed	
19 June 2025	CB	(England) Jack Matton	Undisclosed	
19 June 2025	GK	(Kosovo) Laurence Shala	Undisclosed	
14 November 2025	LW	(England) Cam Stones	Undisclosed (Note: First professional contract)	
23 January 2026	CM	(England) Luke Leahy	Undisclosed	
23 January 2026	GK	(England) Stuart Moore	Undisclosed	
5 March 2026	LB	(Scotland) Daniel Harvie	Undisclosed	
11 March 2026	CM	(England) Josh Scowen	Undisclosed	

=== In ===
Date	Pos.	Player	From	Fee	Ref.
10 July 2025	Midfielder	(England) Anthony Adu		Free	
10 July 2025	Midfielder	(England) Connor Austin		Free	
10 July 2025	Forward	(England) Nsemi Bassega		Free	
10 July 2025	Winger	(England) Cameron Stones		Free	
10 July 2025	Forward	(England) Kyle Cross		Free	
10 July 2025	Goalkeeper	(England) Kyle Defraine		Free	
10 July 2025	Defender	(England) Arthur Gregory		Free	
10 July 2025	Goalkeeper	(Nigeria) Israel Jegede		Free	
10 July 2025	Defender	(England) Joseph Kandala		Free	
10 July 2025	Goalkeeper	(United States) Sam Keller		Free	
10 July 2025	Defender	(England) Mohamed Keita		Free	
10 July 2025	Defender	(England) Jackson King		Free	
10 July 2025	Midfielder	(England) Chris Lutonadio		Free	
10 July 2025	Defender	(England) Tyrone Mlotshwa		Free	
10 July 2025	Defender	(England) Yusuf Mohammed		Free	
10 July 2025	Forward	(Nigeria) Micah Olabiyi		Free	
10 July 2025	Goalkeeper	(England) Jonny Pettitt		Free	
10 July 2025	Midfielder	(England) Deniro Prempeh-Murray		Free	
10 July 2025	Defender	(England) Archie Quinlan		Free	
10 July 2025	Defender	(England) Kayden Quarcoo		Free	
10 July 2025	Forward	(England) Mekhi Savage		Free	
10 July 2025	Midfielder	(England) Ollie Webster		Free	
24 October 2025	Defender	(England) Josh Gidaree	(England) Wolverhampton Wanderers U18	Free	

=== Loaned Out ===
Date	Pos.	Player	To	Date until	Ref.
7 January 2026	CF	(England) Jahiem Dotse	(England) Bracknell Town	4 February 2026	
7 January 2026	LB	(England) Arthur Gregory	(England) Bracknell Town	7 February 2026	
25 January 2026	CF	(England) Mekhi Savage	(England) Walton & Hersham	22 February 2026	
25 January 2026	CF	(England) Christian Swaby	(England) Aylesbury United	22 February 2026	
2 February 2026	CB	(England) Chris Lutonadio	(England) Marlow	28 February 2026	

== Pre-season and friendlies ==
On 22 May, Wycombe Wanderers announced their first pre-season friendly, against Barnet. Five days later, a second fixture was added to the schedule, against Sutton United. One day later, a third friendly was confirmed, against Cheltenham Town.

A behind closed doors fixture against Tottenham Hotspur was also later announced.

Win Draw Loss Fixtures

12 July 2025 Friendly	Brighton & Hove Albion	6–1	Wycombe Wanderers	Lancing
15:00 BST	Welbeck (x4); Buonanotte; Tasker	Report	Quitirna	Stadium: Elite Football Performance Centre; Attendance: 0 (behind-closed-doors)

15 July 2025 Friendly	Sutton United	1–0	Wycombe Wanderers	Sutton
19:30 BST	Crichlow 87'	Report		Stadium: Gander Green Lane

19 July 2025 Friendly	Cheltenham Town	0–3	Wycombe Wanderers	Cheltenham
15:00 BST		Report	Kone 20', 38'; Trialist 86'	Stadium: Whaddon Road

22 July 2025 Friendly	Barnet	1–1	Wycombe Wanderers	Edgware
19:45 BST	Galvin 76'	Report	Kone 9'	Stadium: The Hive Stadium

26 July 2025 Friendly	Tottenham Hotspur	2–2	Wycombe Wanderers	Enfield
11:00 BST	Sarr 14', 66'	Report	Quitirna 32', 50'	Stadium: Hotspur Way; Attendance: 0 (behind-closed-doors)

29 July 2025 Friendly	Wycombe Wanderers	2–0	Notts County B	Marlow
13:00 BST	Tilley; Fink	Report		Stadium: Marlow Road Training Ground; Attendance: 0 (behind-closed-doors)

== Competitions ==
=== EFL League One ===
==== League table ====
Pos	Team	Pld	W	D	L	GF	GA	GD	Pts
9	Huddersfield Town	46	18	13	15	74	64	+10	67
10	Mansfield Town	46	16	17	13	62	50	+12	65
11	Wycombe Wanderers	46	17	12	17	69	58	+11	63
12	Reading	46	16	15	15	64	60	+4	63
13	Blackpool	46	17	9	20	54	65	−11	60

Source: EFL Official Website
Rules for classification: 1) Points; 2) Goal difference; 3) Number of goals scored; 4) Head-to-head results; 5) Wins; 6) Away goals; 7) Penalty points (sec 9.5); 8) 12-point sending off offences

==== Results summary ====
Overall								Home						Away					
Pld	W	D	L	GF	GA	GD	Pts	W	D	L	GF	GA	GD	W	D	L	GF	GA	GD
46	17	12	17	69	58	+11	63	13	3	7	45	23	+22	4	9	10	24	35	−11

Last updated: complete.
Source: Soccerway

==== Results by round ====
Round	1	2	3	4	5	6	7	8	9	10	11	12	13	14	15	16	17	18	19	20	21	22	23	24	25	27	28	29	30	31	32	33	34	35	26^{1}	36	37	38	39	40	41	42	43	44	45	46
Ground	A	H	A	H	H	A	H	A	H	A	H	A	A	H	H	A	H	A	H	A	H	A	A	H	H	A	H	H	A	H	A	A	H	H	A	A	H	A	A	H	A	H	A	H	A	H
Result	L	L	D	L	D	L	W	L	W	L	D	W	D	W	W	D	W	D	L	D	W	L	D	D	W	W	L	W	D	W	L	D	W	W	W	L	L	W	L	W	L	L	D	L	L	W
Position	18	20	20	20	21	22	19	19	18	20	20	19	17	17	14	14	10	11	13	12	9	10	9	13	10	9	12	8	9	8	11	10	9	9	6	9	9	9	10	8	8	11	11	11	12	11
Points	0	0	1	1	2	2	5	5	8	8	9	12	13	16	19	20	23	24	24	25	28	28	29	30	33	36	36	39	40	43	43	44	47	50	53	53	53	56	56	59	59	59	60	60	60	63

Source: EFL
A = Away; H = Home; W = Win; D = Draw; L = Loss; P = Postponed
Notes:
- ^{1} Matchday 26 (vs Barnsley) was postponed due to Barnsley's continued involvement in the FA Cup.

==== Matches ====
On 26 June, the EFL League One fixtures were announced, with Wycombe visiting Bradford City on the opening weekend.

Win Draw Loss Fixtures

2 August 2025 1	Bradford City	2–1	Wycombe Wanderers	Bradford
15:00 BST	Sarcevic 6'; Pointon 13'; J. Wright (yellow card) 67'; T. Wright (yellow card) 87'; Power (yellow card) 90+2'	Report	Hagelskjær (yellow card) 16'; Udoh 68'; Leahy (yellow card) 71'; Norris (yellow card) 72'; Harvie (yellow card) 86'	Stadium: Valley Parade; Attendance: 19,604 (580 away); Referee: Seb Stockbridge

9 August 2025 2	Wycombe Wanderers	1–2	Stockport County	High Wycombe
15:00 BST	Harvie (yellow card) 19'; Taylor (yellow card) 65'; Mullins 74'; Leahy (yellow card) 78'	Report	Wootton 9'; Diamond 51'; Bailey (yellow card) 81'	Stadium: Adams Park; Attendance: 5,590 (861 away); Referee: Ollie Yates

16 August 2025 3	Doncaster Rovers	1–1	Wycombe Wanderers	Doncaster
15:00 BST	Sharp 56'; O'Riordan (yellow card) 75'; Bailey (yellow card) 84'; Broadbent (yellow card) 90+2'	Report	Mullins (yellow card) 30'; Quitirna 71'; Onyedinma (yellow card) 90+3'	Stadium: Eco-Power Stadium; Attendance: 8,084 (462 away); Referee: Martin Coy

19 August 2025 4	Wycombe Wanderers	0–1	Exeter City	High Wycombe
19:45 BST	Lowry (yellow card) 35'; Leahy (yellow card) 45+1'; Grimmer (yellow card) 85'; Allen (yellow card) 86'	Report	Dean (yellow card) 4'; Niskanen (yellow card) 27'; Fitzwater (yellow card) 67'; Grimmer 83' (o.g.)	Stadium: Adams Park; Attendance: 4,661 (372 away); Referee: Ben Atkinson

23 August 2025 5	Wycombe Wanderers	2–2	Reading	High Wycombe
15:00 BST	Onyedinma 10'; Tilley 89'; Hagelskjær (yellow card) 90+2'	Report	Elliott (yellow card) 36'; Camará 42', (yellow card) 50'; Wing 44'; Lane (yellow card) 82'	Stadium: Adams Park; Attendance: 6,639 (1,842 away); Referee: Alex Chilowicz

30 August 2025 6	Stevenage	1–0	Wycombe Wanderers	Stevenage
15:00 BST	Campbell 34'; Houghton (yellow card) 54'; Freestone (yellow card) 84'	Report	Harvie (yellow card) 45'; Quitirna (yellow card) 69'	Stadium: Broadhall Way; Attendance: 3,779 (679 away); Referee: Simon Mather

6 September 2025 7	Wycombe Wanderers	2–0	Mansfield Town	High Wycombe
15:00 BST	Leahy (yellow card) 10'; Bell 14'; Woodrow 52' (pen.); Woodrow (yellow card) 58'; Henderson (yellow card) 88'		Sweeney (yellow card) 28'; Bowery (yellow card) 45+4'; Blake-Tracy (yellow card) 51'	Stadium: Adams Park; Attendance: 5,080 (832 away); Referee: Scott Oldham

13 September 2025 8	Peterborough United	2–1	Wycombe Wanderers	Peterborough
15:00 BST	Garbett 21'; Morgan 41'; Khela (yellow card) 53'; Nevett (yellow card) 84'; Hayes (yellow card) 90'	Report	Onyedinma 49'; Harvie (yellow card) 69'	Stadium: London Road Stadium; Attendance: 8,595 (466 away); Referee: Jacob Miles

20 September 2025 9	Wycombe Wanderers	2–0	Northampton Town	High Wycombe
15:00 BST	Harvie 17'; Abbott 72'; Boyd-Munce (yellow card) 90+5'	Report	Fornah (yellow card) 56'	Stadium: Adams Park; Attendance: 5,197 (671 away); Referee: Andrew Madley

27 September 2025 10	AFC Wimbledon	2–1	Wycombe Wanderers	Wimbledon
12:30 BST	Bugiel 11'; Seddon 32'	Report	Henderson 60'	Stadium: Plough Lane; Attendance: 8,477 (875 away); Referee: Scott Jackson
Note: Fixture was originally scheduled for a 15:00 kick-off, but was moved live Sky Sports broadcasting.

4 October 2025 11	Wycombe Wanderers	2–2	Barnsley	High Wycombe
12:30 BST	Woodrow (yellow card) 74'; Bell 88'; Lowry 90+3'	Report	Cleary 25'; Cooper (yellow card) 43'; Keillor-Dunn 50'; Bland (yellow card) 65'	Stadium: Adams Park; Attendance: 4,932 (569 away); Referee: Ross Joyce
Note: Fixture was originally scheduled for a 15:00 kick-off, but was rescheduled for live Sky Sports broadcasting.

11 October 2025 12	Wigan Athletic	0–1	Wycombe Wanderers	Wigan
15:00 BST	Aimson (yellow card) 61'	Report	Bell 35', (yellow card) 57'; Allen (yellow card) 76'	Stadium: Brick Community Stadium; Attendance: 7,892 (203 away); Referee: Andrew Humphries

18 October 2025 13	Blackpool	1–1	Wycombe Wanderers	Blackpool
15:00 BST	Evans (yellow card) 41'; Fletcher 45'; Hamilton (yellow card) 55'; Brown (yellow card) 90+13'	Report	Grimmer 90+12'	Stadium: Bloomfield Road; Attendance: 8,876; Referee: Neil Hair

25 October 2025 14	Wycombe Wanderers	3–0	Huddersfield Town	High Wycombe
15:00 BST	Lowry (yellow card) 20'; Woodrow 38'; Onyedinma 75'; Vost 80' (o.g.)	Report	May (red card) 25'	Stadium: Adams Park; Attendance: 5,738 (871 away); Referee: Lee Swabey

8 November 2025 15	Wycombe Wanderers	4-1	Leyton Orient	High Wycombe
12:30 GMT	Onyedinma 4', 16'; Norris (yellow card) 10'; Casey 30'; Bell 75'; Woodrow (yellow card) 77'; Lowry (yellow card) 90+4'	Report	Abdulai (yellow card) 17'; Cahill (yellow card) 26'; James (yellow card) 34'	Stadium: Adams Park; Attendance: 4,991 (697 away); Referee: Martin Woods
Note: Fixture was originally scheduled for a 15:00 kick-off, but was rescheduled for live Sky Sports broadcasting.

15 November 2025 16	Port Vale	0–0	Wycombe Wanderers	Burslem
15:00 GMT	Heneghan (yellow card) 13'; Humphreys (yellow card) 37'; John (yellow card) 43'; Debrah (yellow card) 48'; Ojo (yellow card) 77'; Cole (yellow card) 90+1'	Report	Casey (yellow card) 32'	Stadium: Vale Park; Attendance: 6,783 (443 away); Referee: Jacob Miles

22 November 2025 17	Wycombe Wanderers	3–2	Lincoln City	High Wycombe
15:00 GMT	Leahy (yellow card) 11'; Bell 16', 45'; Henderson (yellow card) 67'; Grimmer 88'	Report	Moylan (yellow card) 53'; Obikwu 64'; Draper 76'	Stadium: Adams Park; Attendance: 4,872 (384 away); Referee: Lee Swabey

29 November 2025 18	Rotherham United	1–1	Wycombe Wanderers	Rotherham
15:00 GMT	Gore (yellow card) 39'; Spence (yellow card) 66', (goal) 70'; James (yellow card) 81'	Report	Taylor (yellow card) 12'; Mullins 14'; Grimmer (yellow card) 39'	Stadium: New York Stadium; Attendance: 8,360 (334 away); Referee: Seb Stockbridge

9 December 2025 19	Wycombe Wanderers	0–1	Plymouth Argyle	High Wycombe
19:45 GMT		Report	Dale (yellow card) 30'; Boateng (yellow card) 34'; Sorinola (yellow card) 56'; Oseni 61', (yellow card) 63'; Galloway (yellow card) 80'; Szűcs (yellow card) 90+6'	Stadium: Adams Park; Attendance: 4,664 (552 away); Referee: Peter Wright

13 December 2025 20	Burton Albion	0–0	Wycombe Wanderers	Burton upon Trent
15:00 GMT		Report	Casey (yellow card) 49'	Stadium: Pirelli Stadium; Attendance: 2,844; Referee: Neil Hair and Richie Watkins

20 December 2025 21	Wycombe Wanderers	2–1	Bolton Wanderers	High Wycombe
15:00 GMT	Grimmer 40'; Quitirna 43'; Woodrow (yellow card) 69'; Norris (yellow card) 90'	Report	Gale 16'	Stadium: Adams Park; Attendance: 6,197 (1,157 away); Referee: Craig Hicks

26 December 2025 22	Luton Town	4–0	Wycombe Wanderers	Luton
15:00 GMT	Kodua 7', 44'; Clark 70'; Morris 78'	Report	Westergaard (yellow card) 41'; Norris (yellow card) 79'	Stadium: Kenilworth Road; Attendance: 11,596 (1,092 away); Referee: Dean Whitestone

29 December 2025 23	Plymouth Argyle	1–1	Wycombe Wanderers	Plymouth
19:45 GMT	Mumba (yellow card) 33'; Pleguezuelo (yellow card) 83'; Pepple 90+4'	Report	Casey 11', (yellow card) 90+6'; Henderson (yellow card) 44'; Norris (yellow card) 80'	Stadium: Home Park; Attendance: 15,766 (385 away); Referee: Carl Brook

1 January 2026 24	Wycombe Wanderers	1–1	Cardiff City	High Wycombe
15:00 GMT	Boyd-Munce 30', (yellow card) 89'		Willock 6'; Robertson (yellow card) 14'; Salech (yellow card) 45+4'; Lawlor (yellow card) 89'	Stadium: Adams Park; Attendance: 7,364 (1,835 away); Referee: Alan Young

4 January 2026 25	Wycombe Wanderers	2–0	AFC Wimbledon	High Wycombe
15:00 GMT	Quitirna 12'; Harvie (yellow card) 31'; Huggins 67', (yellow card) 90'	Report	Hippolyte (yellow card) 14'; Browne (yellow card) 73'	Stadium: Adams Park; Attendance: 5,856 (1,194 away); Referee: Thomas Parsons

17 January 2026 27	Northampton Town	1–2	Wycombe Wanderers	Northampton
15:00 GMT	Wormleighton (yellow card) 20'; Guthrie 36'; Taylor (yellow card) 58'	Report	Allen (yellow card) 5'; Onyedinma 17', 64'; Woodrow (yellow card) 58'; Harvie (yellow card) 89'	Stadium: Sixfields Stadium; Attendance: 6,756 (838 away); Referee: Lee Swabey

24 January 2026 28	Wycombe Wanderers	0–2	Peterborough United	High Wycombe
15:00 GMT		Report	Lisbie 37'; Hayes 68'; Dornelly (yellow card) 80'	Stadium: Adams Park; Attendance: 7,166 (792 away); Referee: Tom Reeves

27 January 2026 29	Wycombe Wanderers	2–0	Wigan Athletic	High Wycombe
19:45 GMT	Boyd-Munce 2' (pen.); Woodrow 72'	Report		Stadium: Adams Park; Attendance: 4,190 (181 away); Referee: Paul Howard

31 January 2026 30	Mansfield Town	0–0	Wycombe Wanderers	Mansfield
15:00 GMT		Report	Fink (yellow card) 90+1'	Stadium: Field Mill; Attendance: 7,401 (386 away); Referee: Benjamin Speedie

7 February 2026 31	Wycombe Wanderers	4–0	Doncaster Rovers	High Wycombe
15:00 GMT	Morley 13'; Boyd-Munce (yellow card) 17'; Woodrow 47'; Onyedinma 59'; Mullins 72'	Report	McGrath (yellow card) 48'	Stadium: Adams Park; Attendance: 5,063 (512 away); Referee: Kirsty Dowle

14 February 2026 32	Reading	3–2	Wycombe Wanderers	Reading
12:30 GMT	Marriott 8', 44', 74'; Young (yellow card) 31'; O'Connor (yellow card) 64'; Savage (yellow card) 90+3'	Report	Casey 51'; Harris (yellow card) 66'; Hagelskjær 72'; Vidigal (yellow card) 90+3'	Stadium: Madejski Stadium; Attendance: 13,105 (1,682 away); Referee: Martin Woods
Note: Fixture was initially scheduled for a 15:00 kick-off, but was rescheduled for live Sky Sports broadcasting.

17 February 2026 33	Exeter City	1–1	Wycombe Wanderers	Exeter
19:45 GMT	Wareham 90+1'	Report	Onyedinma 22'; Henderson (yellow card) 45'; Harris (yellow card) 69'	Stadium: St James Park; Attendance: 6,188 (208 away); Referee: Gavin Ward

21 February 2026 34	Wycombe Wanderers	3–1	Stevenage	High Wycombe
12:30 GMT	Woodrow 16'; Hagelskjær (yellow card) 47'; Lowe 68'; Quitirna 90+6'	Report	Sweeney (yellow card) 46'; Reid 49'	Stadium: Adams Park; Attendance: 4,727 (304 away); Referee: Matthew Russell
Note: Fixture was initially scheduled for a 15:00 kick-off, but was rescheduled for live Sky Sports broadcasting.

28 February 2026 35	Wycombe Wanderers	3–0	Burton Albion	High Wycombe
15:00 GMT	Boyd-Munce 15'; Henderson (yellow card) 20'; Harris (yellow card) 45+2', (goal) 81'; Norris (yellow card) 55'; Lowe 82'	Report	Cannon (yellow card) 45+2'; Sibbick (yellow card) 85'	Stadium: Adams Park; Attendance: 4,797; Referee: Alex Chilowicz

3 March 2026 26	Barnsley	0–1	Wycombe Wanderers	Barnsley
19:45 GMT	O'Connell (yellow card) 61'; Yoganathan (yellow card) 86'; Connell (yellow card) 90+3'	Report	Morley 59'; Casey (yellow card) 72'; Norris (yellow card) 82'; Mullins (yellow card) 87'	Stadium: Oakwell; Attendance: 8,608 (194 away); Referee: Oliver Yates
Note: Fixture was originally scheduled for 10 January, but was postponed due to Barnsley's FA Cup involvements.

7 March 2026 36	Bolton Wanderers	3–2	Wycombe Wanderers	Horwich
15:00 GMT	Osei-Tutu (yellow card) 56'; Kenny (yellow card) 76'; Rodrigues 88'; Burstow 90+1'; Blackett-Taylor 90+5', (yellow card) 90+6'	Report	Woodrow 27', (yellow card) 87'; Harris 41'; Allen (yellow card) 56'; Harvie (yellow card) 58'; Boyd-Munce (yellow card) 71'	Stadium: Toughsheet Community Stadium; Attendance: 20,512 (369 away); Referee: Matt Corlett

14 March 2026 37	Wycombe Wanderers	1–2	Luton Town	High Wycombe
15:00 GMT	Harris (yellow card) 61'; Harvie (yellow card) 70'; Vidigal (yellow card) 84'; Quitirna 90+7'	Report	Naismith 21'; Palmer 39'; Saville (yellow card) 45+1'	Stadium: Adams Park; Attendance: 6,761 (1,482 away); Referee: Craig Hicks

17 March 2026 38	Cardiff City	0–2	Wycombe Wanderers	Leckwith
19:45 GMT	Osho (red card) 43'; Robertson (yellow card) 45+2'; Colwill (yellow card) 83'	Report	Vidigal 79', (yellow card) 80'; Woodrow 84'	Stadium: Cardiff City Stadium; Attendance: 16,663; Referee: Carl Brook

21 March 2026 39	Leyton Orient	2–0	Wycombe Wanderers	Leyton
15:00 GMT	Mitchell 19'; Archibald (yellow card) 44'; Forrester (yellow card) 74'; Ballard (yellow card) 78'; El Mizouni 90+1'	Report	Allen (red card) 9'	Stadium: Brisbane Road; Attendance: 8,140 (1,026 away); Referee: Simon Mather

28 March 2026 40	Wycombe Wanderers	4–0	Port Vale	High Wycombe
15:00 GMT	Woodrow 24'; Harvie (yellow card) 36'; Taylor 69'; Onyedinma 85'; Quitirna 90+3'	Report	Ojo (yellow card) 65'; Walters (yellow card) 72'	Stadium: Adams Park; Attendance: 5,073 (366 away); Referee: Darren Drysdale

3 April 2026 41	Stockport County	3–0	Wycombe Wanderers	Edgeley
15:00 BST	Vidigal 6'	Report	Henderson (yellow card) 56'	Stadium: Edgeley Park; Attendance: 9,476 (561 away); Referee: Elliot Bell

6 April 2026 42	Wycombe Wanderers	1–2	Bradford City	High Wycombe
15:00 BST	Vidigal 6'; Harvie (yellow card) 66'	Report	Touray (yellow card) 36'; Pointon 52'; Baldwin 68'; Ashby (yellow card) 80'; Metcalfe (yellow card) 90'; Jackson (yellow card) 90+6'	Stadium: Adams Park; Attendance: 6,718 (1,192 away); Referee: Will Finnie

11 April 2026 43	Huddersfield Town	3–3	Wycombe Wanderers	Huddersfield
15:00 BST	Ledson 48'; Harness 75', 90+6'	Report	Lowe 35', 90+11'; Allen (yellow card) 36'; Norris (yellow card) 41'; Taylor 90'	Stadium: Kirklees Stadium; Attendance: 16,477 (320 away); Referee: James Oldham

18 April 2026 44	Wycombe Wanderers	0–1	Blackpool	High Wycombe
15:00 BST	Woodrow (yellow card) 10'; Skura (yellow card) 61'	Report	Casey (yellow card) 31'; Leahy 48' (o.g.); Coulson (yellow card) 60' (yellow-red card) 70'; Husband (yellow card) 86'	Stadium: Adams Park; Attendance: 5,797 (449 away); Referee: Andrew Humphries

25 April 2026 45	Lincoln City	4–3	Wycombe Wanderers	Lincoln
15:00 BST	Moylan 34'; Hackett 38' (pen.), 53'; Bradley (yellow card) 50'; Varfolomeyev (yellow card) 65'; Darikwa 83'	Report	Scowen 57'; Skura 74'; Woodrow 90+4'; Quitirna (yellow card) 90+6'	Stadium: Sincil Bank; Attendance: 10,125 (441 away); Referee: Scott Oldham

2 May 2026 46	Wycombe Wanderers	3–2	Rotherham United	High Wycombe
15:00 BST	Allen 11'; Fink 25'; Henderson (yellow card) 45+9'; Olabiyi 90+1'	Report	Yearwood (yellow card) 1'; Holmes 17', 22'; Gray (yellow card) 76'	Stadium: Adams Park; Attendance: 5,568 (364 away); Referee: Harrison Blair

=== FA Cup ===
Wycombe were drawn at home to Plymouth Argyle in the first round and away to Exeter City in the second round.

Win Draw Loss Fixtures

1 November 2025 First round	Wycombe Wanderers	2–0	Plymouth Argyle	High Wycombe
15:00 GMT	Woodrow 67' (pen.), 79'; Taylor (red card) 87'	Report	Ibrahim (yellow card) 24'; Ross (yellow card) 34'; Sorinola (yellow card) 68'	Stadium: Adams Park; Attendance: 3,571 (915 away); Referee: Scott Oldham

6 December 2025 Second round	Exeter City	4–0	Wycombe Wanderers	Exeter
15:00 GMT	Yfeko (yellow card) 19'; Aitchison 39', 59', (yellow card) 63'; Sweeney (yellow card) 52'; Higgins 80'; Wareham 90+7'	Report	Grimmer (yellow card) 20'	Stadium: St James Park; Attendance: 5,161 (390 away); Referee: James Durkin

=== EFL Cup ===
Wycombe were drawn away to Leyton Orient in the first round, Bromley in the second round, Wigan Athletic in the third round and at home to Fulham in the fourth round.

After a 2-0 Win against Wigan, Wycombe made the Round of 16 of the Carabao Cup for the first time since the 2006/07 season, where they reached the Semi Finals.

Win Draw Loss Fixtures

12 August 2025 First round	Leyton Orient	0–1	Wycombe Wanderers	Leyton
19:45 BST	Bakinson (yellow card) 4'	Report	Simpson 90+4' (o.g.); Back (yellow card) 90+5'; Gregory (yellow card) 90+7'	Stadium: Brisbane Road; Attendance: 3,293; Referee: Tom Nield

26 August 2025 Second round	Bromley	1–1 (4–5 p)	Wycombe Wanderers	Bromley
19:45 BST	Arthurs 35'	Report	Westergaard 5'	Stadium: Hayes Lane; Attendance: 2,310 (339 away); Referee: Thomas Parsons
	Penalties
	Cheek (penalty scored); Arthurs (penalty missed); Odutayo (penalty scored); Ifill (penalty scored); Webster (penalty missed); Cameron (penalty scored); Hondermarck (penalty missed)		(penalty scored) Boyd-Munce; (penalty missed) Savage; (penalty scored) Hartridge; (penalty scored) Lowry; (penalty missed) Westergaard; (penalty scored) Back; (penalty scored) Stones

23 September 2025 Third round	Wigan Athletic	0–2	Wycombe Wanderers	Wigan
19:45 BST	Wright (yellow card) 78'; Costelloe (yellow card) 90+5'	Report	Boyd-Munce 32'; Back (yellow card) 41'; Huggins (yellow card) 60'; McNeilly 62'; Lowry (yellow card) 90+4'	Stadium: Brick Community Stadium; Attendance: 2,077 (139 away); Referee: Edward Duckworth

28 October 2025 Fourth round	Wycombe Wanderers	1–1 (4–5 p)	Fulham	High Wycombe
19:45 GMT	Woodrow 4'; Grimmer (yellow card) 45+1'; McNeilly (yellow card) 90'	Report	King 48', (yellow card) 60'	Stadium: Adams Park; Attendance: 9,709; Referee: Bobby Madley
	Penalties
	Henderson (penalty missed); Leahy (penalty scored); Boyd-Munce (penalty scored); Hagelskjær (penalty scored); Bell (penalty scored); Onyedinma (penalty missed); McNeilly (penalty missed)		(penalty scored) Lukić; (penalty scored) Traoré; (penalty scored) Kevin; (penalty scored) Iwobi; (penalty missed) Sessegnon; (penalty missed) Kusi-Asare; (penalty scored) Diop

=== EFL Trophy ===
Wycombe were drawn against Colchester United, Gillingham and Fulham U21 in the group stage. After finishing second in the group stage, they were drawn away to Northampton Town in the round of 32.

Pos	Div	Team	Pld	W	PW	PL	L	GF	GA	GD	Pts	Qualification
1	L2	Colchester United	3	3	0	0	0	6	2	+4	9	Advance to Round 2
2	L1	Wycombe Wanderers	3	2	0	0	1	7	3	+4	6	Advance to Round 2
3	L2	Gillingham	3	1	0	0	2	5	6	−1	3	
4	ACA	Fulham U21	3	0	0	0	3	2	9	−7	0	

Source: EFL

Win Draw Loss Fixtures

2 September 2025 South Group G	Wycombe Wanderers	1–2	Colchester United	High Wycombe
19:00 BST	Lowry 45'; Henderson (yellow card) 51'; Hagelskjær (yellow card) 69'	Report	Baldwin (yellow card) 19'; Williams 29'; Tucker 90'	Stadium: Adams Park; Attendance: 930 (143 away); Referee: Darren Drysdale

7 October 2025 South Group G	Wycombe Wanderers	3–1	Fulham U21	High Wycombe
19:00 BST	McNeilly 24'; Boyd-Munce 27'; Fink 50'; Westergaard (yellow card) 84'	Report	Esenga (yellow card) 43'; Wahid 52'; Nwoko (yellow card) 85'	Stadium: Adams Park; Attendance: 569 (89 away); Referee: James Durkin

11 November 2025 South Group G	Gillingham	0–3	Wycombe Wanderers	Gillingham
19:01 GMT			Lowry 9'; Matton 61'; Fink 84'	Stadium: Priestfield Stadium; Attendance: 906 (66 away); Referee: Abigail Byrne

2 December 2025 Round of 32	Northampton Town	2–0	Wycombe Wanderers	Northampton
19:00 GMT	Edwards 26'; Fornah 40'; Dyche (yellow card) 65'; Taylor (yellow card) 81'	Report	McNeilly (yellow card) 57'	Stadium: Sixfields Stadium; Attendance: 1,022; Referee: Isaac Searle

== Wycombe Wanderers PDP Fixtures ==
=== EFL Youth Alliance South ===
Wycombe Entered their Youth Team in the EFL Youth Alliance South Division for the first time since 2011–12 as part of the reopening of the academy, ever since it closed that same year. Their first game was announced on August 5, 2025, as they face Sutton United away from home and then they face Portsmouth at Harlington Training Ground.

Wycombe got their first win in the Youth Alliance since 2011–12 by beating Sutton United 2–0.

Win Draw Loss Fixtures

9 August 2025	Sutton United	0-2	Wycombe Wanderers	Carshalton
11:00 BST		Report	Bassega 12', 73'	Stadium: David Weir Leisure Centre

16 August 2025	Wycombe Wanderers	2-4	Portsmouth	Harlington
	Goal	Report	Thomas; Lee; Hammond	Stadium: Harlington Training Ground

23 August 2025	Wycombe Wanderers	1-3	Plymouth Argyle	Harlington
	Bassega	Report	Maund 3', 15'; Campbell 45+'	Stadium: Harlington Training Ground

30 August 2025	Swindon Town	0-2	Wycombe Wanderers	Swindon
11:00 BST			15'; 37'

13 September 2025	Wycombe Wanderers	4-1	Cheltenham Town	Harlington
				Stadium: Harlington Training Ground

20 September 2025	Wycombe Wanderers	2-0	Bristol Rovers	Harlington
				Stadium: Harlington Training Ground

27 September 2025	Wycombe Wanderers	4-0	Newport County	Harlington
				Stadium: Harlington Training Ground

25 October 2025	Exeter City	3-2	Wycombe Wanderers	Exeter
11:00 BST	Cayless; Appleton

1 November 2025	Forest Green Rovers	1-1	Wycombe Wanderers	Nailsworth
11:00 GMT

8 November 2025	Oxford United	1-2	Wycombe Wanderers	Oxford
11:00 GMT

15 November 2025	Wycombe Wanderers	2-1	Luton Town	Harlington
				Stadium: Harlington Training Ground

6 December 2025	Barnet	0-3	Wycombe Wanderers	Edgware
11:00 BST			Cross

20 December 2025	Wycombe Wanderers	2-2	MK Dons	Harlington
	Olabiyi; Cross	Report		Stadium: Harlington Training Ground

10 January 2026	Wycombe Wanderers	1-2	Northampton Town	Harlington
	Adu	Report		Stadium: Harlington Training Ground

17 January 2026	Cambridge United	3-2	Wycombe Wanderers	Cambridge
	McDougald; Efobi; Gray	Report	Stones

20 January 2026	Bromley	1-0	Wycombe Wanderers	Bromley
				Stadium: Hayes Lane

24 January 2026	Wycombe Wanderers	2-3	Stevenage	Harlington
	Gurpinar; Keita		Lenny Brown; Norris; Wright	Stadium: Harlington Training Ground

31 January 2026	Wycombe Wanderers	4-1	Gillingham	Harlington
	Olabiyi; Stones; (o.g.)	Report		Stadium: Harlington Training Ground

7 February 2026	Wycombe Wanderers	2-0	Sutton United	Harlington
	Hughes 60'; Stones 65' (pen.)	Report		Stadium: Harlington Training Ground

14 February 2026	Wycombe Wanderers	2-2	Leyton Orient	Harlington
	Hughes 11'; Stones (pen.), 32'	Report	Nzang 57'; Botendo 68'	Stadium: Harlington Training Ground

21 February 2026	AFC Wimbledon	2-1	Wycombe Wanderers	New Malden
				Stadium: King's College London Sports Ground

28 February 2026	Luton Town	4-1	Wycombe Wanderers	Luton
	El Gourja 18'; Lesser 53'; Gawel 62'; Frimpong-Kwakye 88'		77' (pen.)	Stadium: The Brache

14 March 2026	Milton Keynes Dons	0-1	Wycombe Wanderers	Woughton
				Stadium: Woughton on the Green Pavilion

28 March 2026	Leyton Orient	4-2	Wycombe Wanderers	Buckhurst Hill
	Gbadebo 27'; Lowe 36', 59' (pen.), 90+6'		Stones 40'; Prempeh-Murray 87'	Stadium: Roding Lane

3 April 2026	Wycombe Wanderers	1-3	AFC Wimbledon	Harlington
	Goal		Ashamu; Kirby	Stadium: Harlington Training Ground

11 April 2026	Northampton Town	0–0	Wycombe Wanderers	Moulton
				Stadium: Moulton College

18 April 2026	Wycombe Wanderers	4–4	Cambridge United	Harlington
	Gupinar; Trialist; Cross			Stadium: Harlington Training Ground

21 April 2026	Wycombe Wanderers	2–2	Barnet	Harlington
				Stadium: Harlington Training Ground

25 April 2026	Stevenage	0–1	Wycombe Wanderers	Stevenage
			Trialist 27'	Stadium: Stevenage Sports Hub

28 April 2026	Wycombe Wanderers	2–2	Bromley	Harlington
				Stadium: Harlington Training Ground

2 May 2026	Gillingham	2–2	Wycombe Wanderers	Gillingham
	Zinici 25'; Whitelock 78'		Goal	Stadium: Gillingham Training Ground

=== Youth Alliance Cup ===
Wycombe entered the EFL Youth Alliance Cup in the Preliminary Round as they face Exeter City.

Win Draw Loss Fixtures

12 August 2025 Preliminary Round	Exeter City	1-3	Wycombe Wanderers	Exeter
14:00 BST

18 October 2025 Round of 16	Swindon Town	0-1	Wycombe Wanderers	Swindon
11:00 BST

29 November 2025 Quarter Final	AFC Wimbledon	3-0	Wycombe Wanderers	Wimbledon
11:00 BST

=== FA Youth Cup ===
Wycombe Entered their Youth Team in the FA Youth Cup for the first time since 2011–12 as part of the reopening of the academy. As the Senior team is an EFL Representative, they will enter into the First Round.

In Round 1, Wycombe were drawn against Bristol Rovers. In Round 2, Wycombe were drawn against Bromley and lost.

Win Draw Loss

Fixtures

4 November 2025 Round 1	Wycombe Wanderers	3-1	Bristol Rovers	High Wycombe
19:00 GMT	Stones 32', 70'; Hughes 80'		Dewsbury 56'	Stadium: Adams Park; Attendance: 298; Referee: Colman O'Meara

19 November 2025 Round 2	Wycombe Wanderers	0–1	Bromley	High Wycombe
19:30 GMT				Stadium: Adams Park; Attendance: 272

=== Berks & Bucks Senior Cup ===
Wycombe is set to enter into the Berks & Bucks Senior Cup, this time with their Youth team compared to previous seasons. As part of a revamped structure, Wycombe will enter into the Cup in Round 2 instead of the Quarter Finals like in previous years, this is replicated with the other EFL sides in the County FA (MK Dons entering in Round 1 and Reading entering in Round 3).

On 12 September, Wycombe were drawn away to Penn & Tylers Green F.C. of the Combined Counties League. On 10 October, Wycombe were drawn away to Burnham F.C. of the Combined Counties League Division One North. On November 13, Wycombe were drawn away to Southern League Premier Division South side and current Berks & Bucks Senior Cup holders, Bracknell Town. on 23 January, Wycombe were drawn away to National League South side, and long time rivals, Slough Town, the first time these two teams faced in the Berks & Bucks Senior Cup since 2013, and their first meeting since 2017.

After Beating Slough Town on Penalties, they will face Southern Football League Premier South side Hungerford Town in Wycombe's first Berks & Bucks Senior Cup Final since 2011/12.

In the Final, Wycombe went on to win their 29th Berks & Bucks Senior Cup trophy, their first in 14 years, winning on penalties.

Win Draw Loss Fixtures

8th October 2025 Round 2	Penn & Tylers Green F.C.	1–2	Wycombe Wanderers	Penn
19:45 BST	Losasso 67' (pen.)	Report	Olabiyi 29'; Savage 38'	Stadium: French School Meadow; Attendance: 1,237

12th November 2025 Round 3	Burnham	0–3	Wycombe Wanderers	Burnham
19:00 GMT		Report	Gurpinar 25'; Stones 75' (pen.); Olabiyi 90+4'	Stadium: The 1878 Stadium

9th December 2025 Quarter Finals	Bracknell Town	0–5	Wycombe Wanderers	Sandhurst
19:45 GMT		Report	Dotse 15'; Bartolo 32', 59'; Keita 34', 40'	Stadium: Bottom Meadow; Referee: Samuel Olhausen

24 March 2026 Semi Finals	Slough Town	1–1 (1–3 p)	Wycombe Wanderers	Slough
19:45 GMT	Dyce 10'		Fink 2'	Stadium: Arbour Park Stadium; Attendance: 892
	Penalties
	Davies (penalty missed); Roth (penalty missed); Walker (penalty scored); Drakes-Thomas (penalty missed)		(penalty missed) Fink; (penalty scored) Lowry; (penalty scored) Scowen; (penalty missed) Gregory; (penalty scored) Stones

14 April 2026 Final	Hungerford Town	2–2 (1–4 p)	Wycombe Wanderers	Slough
19:45 GMT	Brandao 88'; Rose 90+8'	Report	McCallum 32'; Savage 39'	Stadium: Arbour Park Stadium; Attendance: 478
	Penalties
	McGrory (penalty missed); Rose (penalty missed); Francis (penalty scored)		(penalty scored) Stones; (penalty scored) Olabiyi; (penalty scored) Lutonadio; (penalty scored) Savage

== Statistics ==
=== Appearances and goals ===
Players with no appearances are not included on the list; italics indicate a loaned in player

No.	Pos	Nat	Player	Total		League One		FA Cup		EFL Cup		EFL Trophy	
No.	Pos	Nat	Player	Apps	Goals	Apps	Goals	Apps	Goals	Apps	Goals	Apps	Goals
1	GK	(Netherlands) NED	Mikki van Sas	15	0	12+0	0	1+0	0	0+0	0	2+0	0
2	DF	(Scotland) SCO	Jack Grimmer	44	3	37+3	3	2+0	0	1+0	0	0+1	0
3	DF	(Scotland) SCO	Daniel Harvie	49	1	44+1	1	2+0	0	0+1	0	1+0	0
4	MF	(England) ENG	Josh Scowen	7	1	2+5	1	0+0	0	0+0	0	0+0	0
5	MF	(England) ENG	Aaron Morley	18	2	15+3	2	0+0	0	0+0	0	0+0	0
6	DF	(England) ENG	Taylor Allen	36	1	26+8	1	0+0	0	2+0	0	0+0	0
7	MF	(Guinea-Bissau) GBS	Junior Quitirna	42	6	15+21	6	1+0	0	1+1	0	3+0	0
8	MF	(Northern Ireland) NIR	Caolan Boyd-Munce	44	5	19+16	3	1+1	0	3+1	1	3+0	1
9	FW	(Switzerland) SUI	Bradley Fink	29	3	4+18	1	0+2	0	1+0	0	3+1	2
10	MF	(England) ENG	Luke Leahy	46	0	31+9	0	2+0	0	1+1	0	1+1	0
11	FW	(England) ENG	Nathan Lowe	12	4	9+3	4	0+0	0	0+0	0	0+0	0
12	FW	(England) ENG	Cauley Woodrow	40	12	30+7	9	2+0	2	1+0	1	0+0	0
15	FW	(England) ENG	James Tilley	13	1	1+5	1	0+1	0	3+0	0	2+1	0
17	DF	(Republic of Ireland) IRL	Dan Casey	32	3	24+1	3	0+0	0	3+0	0	4+0	0
20	MF	(Scotland) SCO	Ewan Henderson	34	1	18+13	1	0+0	0	2+0	0	1+0	0
21	MF	(Republic of Ireland) IRL	Jamie Mullins	38	3	24+11	3	2+0	0	1+0	0	0+0	0
22	DF	(England) ENG	Fin Back	11	0	1+4	0	0+0	0	3+0	0	2+1	0
23	DF	(Wales) WAL	Niall Huggins	23	1	9+10	1	0+0	0	1+0	0	2+1	0
25	DF	(England) ENG	Declan Skura	6	1	3+1	1	0+0	0	0+1	0	1+0	0
26	DF	(England) ENG	Connor Taylor	37	2	22+10	2	2+0	0	1+0	0	2+0	0
28	MF	(Wales) WAL	Luke Harris	19	2	15+4	2	0+0	0	0+0	0	0+0	0
31	GK	(England) ENG	Stuart Moore	1	0	0+0	0	0+0	0	0+0	0	1+0	0
34	DF	(England) ENG	Jack Matton	2	1	0+1	0	0+0	0	0+0	0	1+0	1
37	FW	(England) ENG	Mekhi Savage	4	0	0+0	0	0+0	0	0+1	0	1+2	0
38	DF	(England) ENG	Chris Lutonadio	1	0	0+0	0	0+0	0	0+0	0	0+1	0
44	MF	(Nigeria) NGR	Fred Onyedinma	48	10	40+3	10	1+1	0	2+0	0	1+0	0
45	DF	(Denmark) DEN	Anders Hagelskjær	33	1	24+1	1	2+0	0	3+0	0	2+1	0
50	GK	(England) ENG	Will Norris	40	0	34+0	0	1+0	0	4+0	0	1+0	0
51	MF	(Scotland) SCO	Alex Lowry	24	3	9+6	1	0+2	0	0+3	0	4+0	2
61	DF	(England) ENG	Mohamed Keita	1	0	0+1	0	0+0	0	0+0	0	0+0	0
64	FW	(England) ENG	Cameron Stones	4	0	0+1	0	0+0	0	1+1	0	0+1	0
65	DF	(England) ENG	Arthur Gregory	6	0	0+0	0	0+0	0	0+3	0	2+1	0
67	FW	(Nigeria) NGR	Micah Olabiyi	2	1	0+1	1	0+0	0	0+1	0	0+0	0
68	MF	(England) ENG	Kyle Cross	1	0	0+0	0	0+0	0	0+0	0	0+1	0
71	FW	(England) ENG	Nsemi Bassega	1	0	0+0	0	0+0	0	0+0	0	0+1	0
77	FW	(Angola) ANG	André Vidigal	13	2	5+8	2	0+0	0	0+0	0	0+0	0
Players who featured but departed the club during the season:
5	DF	(England) ENG	Alex Hartridge	2	0	0+0	0	0+0	0	2+0	0	0+0	0
11	FW	(England) ENG	Sam Bell	21	6	17+0	6	2+0	0	1+0	0	0+1	0
11	FW	(Nigeria) NGR	Daniel Udoh	6	1	6+0	1	0+0	0	0+0	0	0+0	0
24	FW	(England) ENG	Donnell McNeilly	17	2	3+7	0	0+2	0	1+1	1	2+1	1
24	FW	(Ivory Coast) CIV	Richard Kone	1	0	0+1	0	0+0	0	0+0	0	0+0	0
29	FW	(Gibraltar) GIB	Jaiden Bartolo	1	0	0+0	0	0+0	0	0+1	0	0+0	0
30	MF	(England) ENG	George Abbott	15	1	6+5	1	0+0	0	3+0	0	0+1	0
42	MF	(Denmark) DEN	Magnus Westergaard	18	1	4+5	0	1+1	0	3+0	1	3+1	0
