= Fin Back =

English footballer

Personal information
- Full name: Finley Jude William Back
- Date of birth: 25 September 2002 (age 24)
- Place of birth: Leicester, England
- Height: 1.88 m (6 ft 2 in)
- Positions: Right-back; defensive midfielder

Youth career
- 2011–2025: Nottingham Forest

Senior career*
Years	Team	Apps	(Gls)
2021–2025	Nottingham Forest	3	(0)
2022–2023	→ Carlisle United (loan)	18	(0)
2023–2024	→ Carlisle United (loan)	21	(0)
2025–2026	Wycombe Wanderers	7	(0)
2026	→ Colchester United (loan)	5	(0)
- * Club domestic league appearances and goals as of 16:38, 31 August 2026 (UTC)

Finley Jude William Back (born 25 September 2002) is an English professional footballer who plays as a right back or defensive midfielder.

== Career ==
=== Nottingham Forest ===
Back joined the Nottingham Forest academy at the age of eight-years old. He went on to earn a professional contract with the club on 4 October 2019 after impressing with the club's under-18's. Back extended his deal with Forest on 13 July 2021. Back made his professional debut for Forest on 11 August 2021, starting in an EFL Cup fixture against Bradford City. His league debut followed on 18 August 2021 against Blackburn Rovers.

==== Carlisle United (loan) ====
On 14 July 2022, Back joined EFL League Two club Carlisle United on a season-long loan deal, which was cut short due to a hamstring injury that required surgery. On 24 July 2023, Back signed for Carlisle United on another season long loan for the newly promoted EFL League One team.

=== Wycombe Wanderers ===
On 3 February 2025, Back ended his 14-year association with Forest and signed with EFL League One side Wycombe Wanderers for an undisclosed fee.

== Personal life ==
Fin is the son of Neil Back MBE, who is a former international rugby union player for England and the British & Irish Lions who also played for Nottingham RFC and Leicester Tigers.

Fin was educated at Ratcliffe College in Leicestershire.

== Career statistics ==
As of 9 February 2026

Appearances and goals by club, season and competition
Club	Season	League			FA Cup		League Cup		Other		Total	
Club	Season	Division	Apps	Goals	Apps	Goals	Apps	Goals	Apps	Goals	Apps	Goals
Nottingham Forest	2021–22	Championship	3	0	0	0	2	0	—		5	0
Nottingham Forest	2022–23	Premier League	0	0	0	0	0	0	—		0	0
Nottingham Forest	2023–24	Premier League	0	0	0	0	0	0	—		0	0
Nottingham Forest	2024–25	Premier League	0	0	0	0	0	0	3 (Note: Appearances in EFL Trophy)	0	0	0
Nottingham Forest	Total		3	0	0	0	2	0	3	0	8	0
Carlisle United (loan)	2022–23	League Two	18	0	0	0	1	0	0	0	19	0
Carlisle United (loan)	2023–24	League One	21	0	0	0	0	0	1	0	22	0
Carlisle United (loan)	Total		39	0	0	0	1	0	1	0	41	0
Wycombe Wanderers	2024–25	League One	2	0	0	0	0	0	0	0	2	0
Wycombe Wanderers	2025–26	League One	5	0	0	0	3	0	3	0	11	0
Wycombe Wanderers	Total		7	0	0	0	3	0	3	0	13	0
Colchester United (loan)	2025–26	League Two	1	0	0	0	0	0	0	0	1	0
Career totals			50	0	0	0	6	0	7	0	63	0

== Honours ==
Nottingham Forest

- EFL Championship play-offs: 2022
