= Sam Bell (footballer, born 2002) =

English association football player

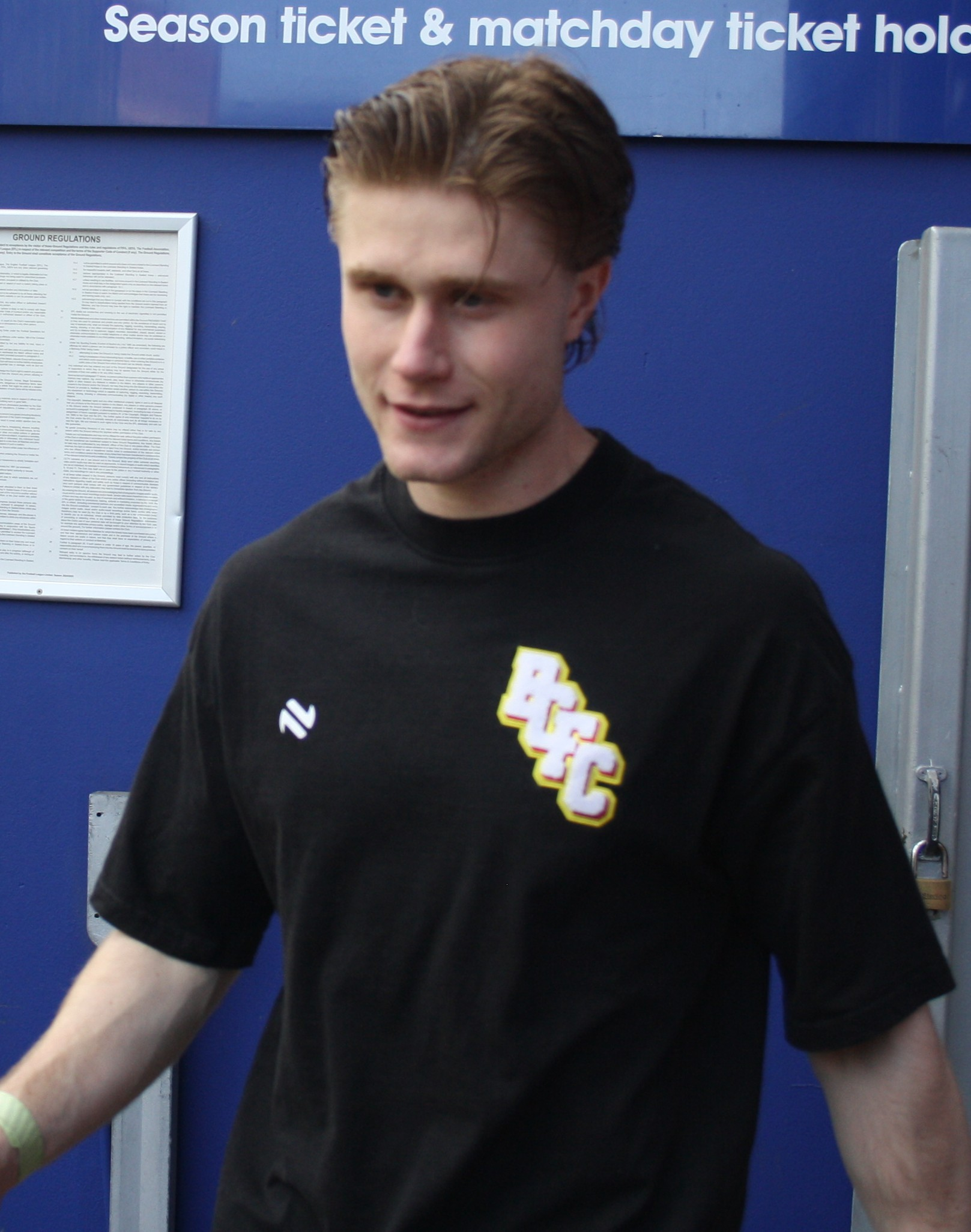

Personal information
- Full name: Samuel John Bell
- Date of birth: 23 May 2002 (age 24)
- Place of birth: Bristol, England
- Height: 1.78 m (5 ft 10 in)
- Position: Forward

Team information
- Current team: Bristol City
- Number: 11

Youth career
- 2011–2019: Bristol City

Senior career*
Years	Team	Apps	(Gls)
2019–	Bristol City	105	(14)
2019	→ Clevedon Town (loan)	4	(3)
2019–2020	→ Yate Town (loan)	12	(7)
2021–2022	→ Grimsby Town (loan)	4	(1)
2025–2026	→ Wycombe Wanderers (loan)	17	(6)

International career^{‡}
2023	England U20	2	(0)
- * Club domestic league appearances and goals as of 17:29, 31 October 2026 (UTC) ‡ National team caps and goals as of 15:05, 24 November 2023 (UTC)

Samuel John Bell (born 23 May 2002) is an English professional footballer who plays as a forward for EFL Championship club Bristol City.

== Career ==
A youth product of Bristol City, Bell joined Clevedon Town on loan in April 2019, where he scored three goals in four matches. Bell joined Yate Town on loan on 20 December 2019.

On 5 December 2020, Bell made his professional debut with Bristol City in a 1–0 Championship loss to Birmingham City.

On 22 November 2021, Bell signed for Grimsby Town on a short-term loan, linking him up with Robins teammate Ryley Towler.

He began to break into the Bristol City first team in December 2022, and scored his first Bristol City goal in the 2022-23 FA Cup third round replay against Swansea City, scoring an extra time winner. He followed this up with a brace against West Bromwich Albion in the 4th round.

On 1 September 2025, Bell joined three other loan signings at EFL League One club Wycombe Wanderers for the rest of the 2025–26 season. He scored on his debut for the club on 6 September 2025, in a 2–0 win against Mansfield Town. Having scored six goals in 21 appearances, he was recalled by his parent club on 1 January 2026.

== International career ==
In November 2023, Bell received his maiden international call up and made his England U20 debut during a 3–0 defeat to Italy at the Eco-Power Stadium.

== Personal life ==
Bell is the son of the retired English footballer Micky Bell, who also represented Bristol City from 1997 to 2005.

== Career statistics ==
As of 31 October 2026

Appearances and goals by club, season and competition
Club	Season	League			FA Cup		League Cup		Other		Total	
Club	Season	Division	Apps	Goals	Apps	Goals	Apps	Goals	Apps	Goals	Apps	Goals
Bristol City	2018–19	Championship	0	0	0	0	0	0	—		0	0
Bristol City	2019–20	Championship	0	0	0	0	0	0	—		0	0
Bristol City	2020–21	Championship	4	0	1	0	0	0	—		5	0
Bristol City	2021–22	Championship	5	0	0	0	1	0	—		6	0
Bristol City	2022–23	Championship	24	3	4	3	1	0	—		29	6
Bristol City	2023–24	Championship	33	5	4	0	2	0	—		39	5
Bristol City	2024–25	Championship	20	0	0	0	1	0	2 (Note: Appearances in EFL Championship play-offs)	0	23	0
Bristol City	2025–26	Championship	13	5	2	0	1	0	—		16	5
Bristol City	2026–27	Championship	6	1	0	0	0	0	—		6	1
Bristol City	Total		105	14	11	3	6	0	2	0	124	17
Clevedon Town (loan)	2018–19	Western League; Premier Division	4	3	0	0	—		0	0	4	3
Yate Town (loan)	2019–20	Southern League; Premier Division South	12	7	0	0	—		0	0	12	7
Grimsby Town (loan)	2021–22	National League	4	1	0	0	—		1 (Note: Appearance in FA Trophy)	0	5	1
Wycombe Wanderers (loan)	2025–26	League One	17	6	2	0	1	0	1 (Note: Appearance(s) in EFL Trophy)	0	21	6
Career total			142	31	13	3	7	0	4	0	166	34
