= Jack Grimmer =

Scottish footballer (born 1994)

- Grimmer with Wycombe Wanderers in 2026

Personal information
- Full name: Jack Richard Grimmer
- Date of birth: 25 January 1994 (age 32)
- Place of birth: Aberdeen, Scotland
- Height: 6 ft 0 in (1.83 m)
- Position: Defender

Team information
- Current team: Wycombe Wanderers
- Number: 2

Youth career
- –2009: Aberdeen

Senior career*
| Years | Team | Apps | (Gls) |
| 2009–2012 | Aberdeen | 4 | (0) |
| 2012–2017 | Fulham | 13 | (0) |
| 2014 | → Port Vale (loan) | 13 | (1) |
| 2014 | → Shrewsbury Town (loan) | 6 | (0) |
| 2016 | → Shrewsbury Town (loan) | 21 | (1) |
| 2016–2017 | → Shrewsbury Town (loan) | 24 | (0) |
| 2017–2019 | Coventry City | 53 | (1) |
| 2019– | Wycombe Wanderers | 228 | (7) |

International career
| 2009 | Scotland U15 | 2 | (0) |
| 2008–2009 | Scotland U16 | 8 | (2) |
| 2009–2010 | Scotland U17 | 10 | (0) |
| 2012 | Scotland U18 | 2 | (0) |
| 2011–2013 | Scotland U19 | 15 | (0) |
| 2014 | Scotland U21 | 1 | (0) |
- * Club domestic league appearances and goals as of 23:13, 4 May 2026 (UTC)

Jack Richard Grimmer (born 25 January 1994) is a Scottish professional footballer who plays as a defender for EFL League One club Wycombe Wanderers, where he is also club captain.

A Scotland under-21 international, he began his career at Aberdeen, becoming the club's youngest-ever player at the age of 16. He was sold to Fulham in January 2012 and has since been loaned out to Port Vale and Shrewsbury Town (in three separate spells). He signed with Coventry City in July 2017 and went on to be named in the EFL League Two PFA Team of the Year for the 2017–18 season as Coventry won promotion via the play-offs. He signed with Wycombe Wanderers in July 2019 and 12 months later helped the club to win promotion out of League One via the play-offs.

== Club career ==
=== Aberdeen ===
Grimmer made his debut for Aberdeen under Mark McGhee on 7 April 2010, becoming the youngest ever Aberdeen player when he came on as a substitute for Steven MacLean in a 3–1 defeat to Rangers at Ibrox at the age of 16 years, 2 months and 13 days. Four days later he made his Pittodrie debut in a 3–1 defeat to St Johnstone.

His next taste of first-team football came in the last two SPL games of the 2010–11 season, which included his first start in professional football in a 1–0 home defeat to St Mirren on 10 May.

In January 2012, Aberdeen manager Craig Brown confirmed that English Premier League club Fulham had expressed interest in signing Grimmer. Brown also stated his belief that Grimmer would best develop his career by staying with the "Dons". Despite this, Grimmer agreed to join Fulham on 18 January, with Aberdeen receiving a £200,000 fee plus incentives. Following his move to Fulham, Aberdeen chief executive Duncan Fraser claimed Grimmer's decision to quit Pittodrie for Fulham showed how young Scottish talent was being lured south of the border by wealthy English clubs and was, therefore a bad indication for the future of Scottish football.

"It did get quite personal. When people say certain things you have to try and take it in your stride. But because it was my hometown team, it was harder to take. I'd been one of them when I was younger sitting in the stands with my season-ticket. But I just had to get on with it. There were fans who agreed with my decision and others who didn't but supported me anyway, knowing I was just a young player making a tough choice. Like everyone who is criticised, I want to go out and try to prove the doubters wrong."

— Grimmer spoke in May 2013 about the abuse and criticism he received on Twitter following his move to Fulham.

=== Fulham ===
Grimmer signed a three-year contract with Fulham and initially joined the club's Academy team. On 7 January 2014, he joined League One side Port Vale on a one-month loan. Manager Micky Adams stated that: "We have a lot of experienced defenders making mistakes and we have been looking to strengthen in that area for a while." Four days later and an injury crisis meant that he started in an inexperienced centre-back partnership with 20-year-old Joe Davis as Vale lost 2–0 to league leaders Brentford at Griffin Park. He was publicly praised by Adams for his performance in the match. He scored his first professional goal with a header in a 1–0 win over Oldham Athletic at Vale Park on 18 January and was named in the Football League team of the week. He impressed in his first four appearances for the "Valiants", and his loan deal was extended until the end of the season. Fulham recalled Grimmer on 27 March 2014 by exercising a clause in the loan agreement, as manager Felix Magath wanted to cover for some defensive injuries.

He joined League Two club Shrewsbury Town on a one-month loan on 18 October 2014. He was persuaded to join the "Shrews" after hearing good things about the club from his friend Fraser Fyvie and being told by manager Micky Mellon that he would fit in with the style of football at New Meadow. Grimmer played seven matches for Shrewsbury, including five consecutive league victories and their 2–1 defeat to Chelsea in the League Cup. Although the loan had been extended to 3 January 2015, he was recalled to Fulham on 24 November and made his Fulham league debut on 29 November against Brighton & Hove Albion at the Falmer Stadium. He made a total of 17 appearances for Kit Symons's "Cottagers" during the 2014–15 campaign. He signed a new two-and-a-half-year contract in March.

On 5 January 2016, Grimmer returned to Shrewsbury on loan until the end of the season. He made his second debut for the club five days later, as he helped Shrewsbury to keep a clean sheet as they beat Cardiff City 1–0 in the FA Cup third round. On 30 January, in the next round at home to Sheffield Wednesday, he headed an added-time winner in a 3–2 victory, after Shrewsbury had trailed 2–1 with five minutes remaining. He was ever-present for the duration of his second loan spell at the club, helping them avoid relegation with a 20th-placed finish in their first season back in League One. On 31 August 2016, he returned to Shrewsbury Town on a loan deal to run until the end of the 2016–17 season. He was in and out of the first XI under new manager Paul Hurst, and ended the campaign with 27 appearances to his name. He was released by Fulham in July 2017.

=== Coventry City ===
Grimmer signed a two-year contract with newly relegated League Two side Coventry City in July 2017. He was named as the division's Player of the Month for September. On 6 January 2018, he scored the winning goal from long-range in Coventry's 2–1 victory over Premier League side Stoke City in the third round of the FA Cup. He went on to be named on the PFA Team of the Year for the 2017–18 campaign as he helped Mark Robins's "Sky Blues" qualify for the play-offs. Coventry then eliminated Notts County in the play-off semi-finals, before Grimmer scored the third goal in a 3–1 victory over Exeter City in the play-off final at Wembley Stadium. However, he was limited to just 13 appearances in the 2018–19 season and admitted that "Last season was a dream, but the difference between that and this season has been like night and day." He was released from the Ricoh Arena on 9 May.

=== Wycombe Wanderers ===
On 22 July 2019, Grimmer signed a two-year contract with League One club Wycombe Wanderers after impressing manager Gareth Ainsworth on trial. He later said it was an unpleasant experience to spend over two months as a free agent, but that "holding off for the right club was absolutely the right decision for my happiness and my enjoyment of the game" and he was "very, very thankful that I am where I am now". He was limited to 18 league appearances during the 2019–20 season, which was settled on points per game (PPG) due to the COVID-19 pandemic in England; Wycombe finished third on PPG. He went on to start all three play-off games, as Wycombe secured a place in the Championship after beating Oxford United in the behind closed doors Wembley final. His fiancée, Sammy, speaking two weeks later, said that "I'm so proud of him and Jack won't let his winner's medal out of his sight – he even took it on holiday with us and we had to keep it in the safe at the hotel".

He signed a new three-year deal with Wycombe in August 2020. Wanderers took their battle against relegation to the last day of the 2020–21 Championship season, but ultimately occupied the final relegation spot. Grimmer finished third in the Supporters' Player of the Year award nominations, as voted for by fans online. He scored his first goal for the "Chairboys" on 11 January 2022, joking after the game that it was "quality over quantity" as his curved strike secured a 2–0 win at Bolton Wanderers. He played 30 games in the 2021–22 season and hoped to win his third play-off final. However, he was an unused substitute as Wycombe were beaten 2–0 by Sunderland. He featured 42 times in the 2022–23 season, though suffered concussion injuries in February and April. He signed a new one-year contract in April 2023.

Grimmer played in the 2024 EFL Trophy final at Wembley, which ended in a 2–1 defeat to Peterborough United. He featured a total of 35 times during the 2023–24 season. In July 2024, and by now the club's longest-serving player, manager Matt Bloomfield named Grimmer as the Wycombe club captain following the departure of Joe Jacobson. He signed a new undisclosed-length contract in December. Bloomfield said he was "pivotal to the culture and values of what our club stands for". He was named the club's PFA Community Champion for the 2024–25 season. Head coach Mike Dodds praised Grimmer for his performance in the first leg of the play-off semi-final draw with Charlton Athletic. However, the second leg ended in defeat to end Wycombe's promotion ambitions.

He fractured his back in a 1–1 draw with Cardiff City on New Year's Day 2026, and head coach Michael Duff said he "will not be back anytime soon". He appeared 44 times in the 2025–26 campaign, scoring three goals.

== International career ==
Grimmer was a key player for Scotland youth teams as a teenager, winning caps for the under-15, under-16, under-17, under-18, and under-19s. He was called up to the Scotland under-21 side for the first time in August 2013 for a qualifier for the 2013 UEFA U-21 Championship. He did not play a game before he withdrew from the squad due to injury. His cap for the under-21s came in a 2–2 draw with Hungary at Tannadice Park on 5 March 2014.

== Style of play ==
Grimmer was described as "tenacious, aggressive, intelligent, accomplished on the ball and rarely makes a mistake" by the Staffordshire Sentinel in February 2014. Due to his strengths going forward he plays as an attacking full-back, though remains a "solid and dependable" defender and can also play as a wing-back.

== Personal life ==
Grimmer is a Manchester United supporter.

== Career statistics ==
As of match played 6 April 2026

Appearances and goals by club, season and competition
| Club | Season | League | | | National cup (Note: Includes Scottish Cup, FA Cup) | | League cup (Note: Includes Scottish League Cup, EFL Cup) | | Other | | Total | |
| Club | Season | Division | Apps | Goals | Apps | Goals | Apps | Goals | Apps | Goals | Apps | Goals |
|---|---|---|---|---|---|---|---|---|---|---|---|---|
| Aberdeen | 2009–10 | SPL | 2 | 0 | 0 | 0 | 0 | 0 | 0 | 0 | 2 | 0 |
| Aberdeen | 2010–11 | SPL | 2 | 0 | 0 | 0 | 0 | 0 | — | | 2 | 0 |
| Aberdeen | 2011–12 | SPL | 0 | 0 | 0 | 0 | 0 | 0 | — | | 0 | 0 |
| Aberdeen | Total | | 4 | 0 | 0 | 0 | 0 | 0 | 0 | 0 | 4 | 0 |
| Fulham | 2012–13 | Premier League | 0 | 0 | 0 | 0 | 0 | 0 | — | | 0 | 0 |
| Fulham | 2013–14 | Premier League | 0 | 0 | 0 | 0 | 0 | 0 | — | | 0 | 0 |
| Fulham | 2014–15 | Championship | 13 | 0 | 4 | 0 | 0 | 0 | — | | 17 | 0 |
| Fulham | 2015–16 | Championship | 0 | 0 | 0 | 0 | 1 | 0 | — | | 1 | 0 |
| Fulham | 2016–17 | Championship | 0 | 0 | 0 | 0 | 1 | 0 | 0 | 0 | 1 | 0 |
| Fulham | Total | | 13 | 0 | 4 | 0 | 2 | 0 | 0 | 0 | 19 | 0 |
| Port Vale (loan) | 2013–14 | League One | 13 | 1 | 1 | 0 | — | | — | | 14 | 1 |
| Shrewsbury Town (loans) | 2014–15 | League Two | 6 | 0 | 0 | 0 | 1 | 0 | — | | 7 | 0 |
| Shrewsbury Town (loans) | 2015–16 | League One | 21 | 1 | 3 | 1 | — | | — | | 24 | 2 |
| Shrewsbury Town (loans) | 2016–17 | League One | 24 | 0 | 1 | 1 | — | | 2 (Note: Appearances in the EFL Trophy) | 0 | 27 | 1 |
| Shrewsbury Town (loans) | Total | | 51 | 1 | 4 | 2 | 1 | 0 | 2 | 0 | 58 | 3 |
| Coventry City | 2017–18 | League Two | 42 | 1 | 5 | 1 | 1 | 0 | 5 (Note: Two appearances in the EFL Trophy and three appearances and one goal in the play-offs) | 1 | 53 | 3 |
| Coventry City | 2018–19 | League One | 11 | 0 | 0 | 0 | 1 | 0 | 1 | 0 | 13 | 0 |
| Coventry City | Total | | 53 | 1 | 5 | 1 | 2 | 0 | 6 | 1 | 66 | 3 |
| Wycombe Wanderers | 2019–20 | League One | 18 | 0 | 1 | 0 | 1 | 0 | 4 (Note: 1 appearance in the EFL Trophy and 3 appearances in the EFL League One play-offs.) | 0 | 24 | 0 |
| Wycombe Wanderers | 2020–21 | Championship | 40 | 0 | 1 | 0 | 1 | 0 | — | | 42 | 0 |
| Wycombe Wanderers | 2021–22 | League One | 26 | 2 | 1 | 0 | 1 | 0 | 2 (Note: 1 appearance in the EFL Trophy and 1 appearance in the EFL League One play-offs.) | 0 | 30 | 2 |
| Wycombe Wanderers | 2022–23 | League One | 40 | 0 | 0 | 0 | 1 | 0 | 1 | 0 | 42 | 0 |
| Wycombe Wanderers | 2023–24 | League One | 27 | 2 | 1 | 0 | 1 | 0 | 6 | 0 | 35 | 2 |
| Wycombe Wanderers | 2024–25 | League One | 37 | 0 | 1 | 0 | 1 | 0 | 4 (Note: 2 appearances in the EFL Trophy and 2 appearances in the EFL League One play-offs.) | 0 | 43 | 0 |
| Wycombe Wanderers | 2025–26 | League One | 40 | 3 | 2 | 0 | 1 | 0 | 1 | 0 | 44 | 3 |
| Wycombe Wanderers | 2026–27 | League One | 0 | 0 | 0 | 0 | 0 | 0 | 0 | 0 | 0 | 0 |
| Wycombe Wanderers | Total | | 228 | 7 | 7 | 0 | 7 | 0 | 18 | 0 | 260 | 7 |
| Career total | | | 362 | 10 | 21 | 3 | 12 | 0 | 26 | 1 | 421 | 14 |

== Honours ==
Coventry City

- EFL League Two play-offs: 2018

Wycombe Wanderers

- EFL League One play-offs: 2020
- EFL Trophy runner-up: 2023–24

Individual

- PFA League Two Player of the Month: September 2017
- PFA Team of the Year: 2017–18 League Two
- PFA Community Champion (Wycombe Wanderers): 2024–25
