= Junior Quitirna =

Bissau-Guinean footballer (born 2000)

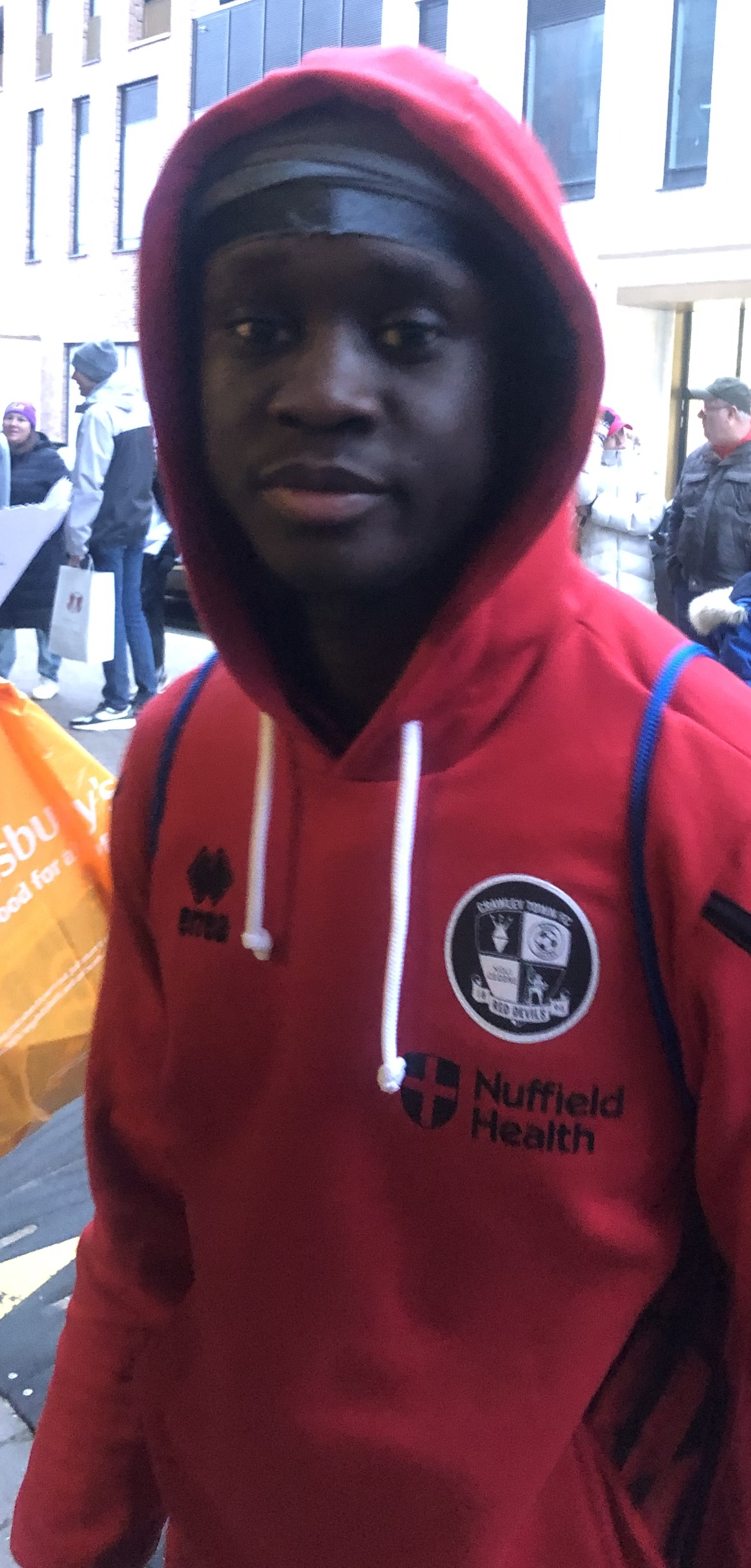
- Junior Quitirna in 2024.

Personal information
- Full name: Armando Junior Quitirna
- Date of birth: 25 April 2000 (age 26)
- Place of birth: Guinea-Bissau
- Height: 1.70 m (5 ft 7 in)
- Positions: Wing-back; attacking midfielder; winger

Team information
- Current team: Wycombe Wanderers
- Number: 7

Youth career
- –2018: AFC Hornchurch
- 2018–2019: Charlton Athletic

Senior career*
Years	Team	Apps	(Gls)
2017–2018	AFC Hornchurch	0	(0)
2019–2021	Charlton Athletic	0	(0)
2021–2023	Waterford	43	(15)
2023–2024	Fleetwood Town	29	(5)
2023	→ Altrincham (loan)	0	(0)
2024–2025	Crawley Town	34	(8)
2025–	Wycombe Wanderers	39	(6)
- * Club domestic league appearances and goals as of 11 October 2026 (UTC)

Armando Junior Quitirna (born 25 April 2000) is a Bissau-Guinean professional footballer who plays as a wing-back or attacking midfielder for EFL League One club Wycombe Wanderers.

== Career ==
=== Early career ===
Quitirna was born in Guinea-Bissau, but moved to London at the age of eight. He started his youth career with local side AFC Hornchurch where he featured mainly for the Development squad but also featured for the first team as an unused substitute in the FA Cup and Isthmian League Division One North, against Hertford Town and Witham Town respectively.

=== Charlton Athletic ===
In 2018 he signed for EFL League One side Charlton Athletic and was placed in the under-23 squad. He failed to make an appearance in his first season with the club as Charlton were promoted to the EFL Championship through the play-offs, with victory over Sunderland at Wembley Stadium. In August 2019, he made his professional debut for the first team when he featured as a substitute in the EFL Cup first round 0–0 draw with Forest Green Rovers, which they eventually lost on penalties. He failed to feature in another matchday squad as Charlton were relegated back to League One after only one season. Following that campaign he was offered a new one-year contract in July 2020 with another one-year option included. He made his second and final appearance for the club in September 2020 in a 0–0 draw with Brighton & Hove Albion U21 in the EFL Trophy. It was announced on 18 May 2021 that he would leave the club at the end of his contract, with Quitirna turning down a new deal in order to pursue first team football.

=== Waterford ===
On 9 July 2021, it was announced that had Quitirna made the move to League of Ireland Premier Division side Waterford after an approach from chairman, Mitch Cowling, who promoted first team football. On the same day, he made his debut for the club, scoring a penalty in a 1–0 win away to Finn Harps. On 30 July 2021, he came off the bench away to Drogheda United in the 75th minute and scored the winning goal eight minutes later in a 2–1 win for his side. He scored six goals in his first 14 appearances in Waterford's hugely improved form in the second half of the season. Waterford finished in 9th position which sent them into a relegation play-off with First Division side UCD, which they subsequently lost 2–1. He made a total of 20 appearances in all competitions over the season, scoring seven goals. In his second season for the club he made a total of 35 appearances in all competitions, scoring 13 goals as the club finished in second behind Champions Cork City. The club qualified for the promotion play-offs, beating Treaty United in the semi-finals and Galway United in the final. However, they lost the promotion/relegation play-off to UCD for the second season running. He was named in the League of Ireland First Division Team of the Year. On 31 January 2023, it was announced that Quitirna had left the club due to ongoing visa issues and a move to sister club, Fleetwood Town, facilitated a move back to the UK.

=== Fleetwood Town ===
Quitirna joined League One club Fleetwood Town until his visa issues were sorted and was immediately loaned out to National League club Altrincham on an initial one-month deal, following in the footsteps of Chris Conn-Clarke and Barry Baggley. Quitirna returned to his parent club on 2 March 2023, after making just one appearance for Altrincham, playing 10 minutes in an FA Trophy tie away to Bracknell Town, in which he scored the last goal in a 3–1 win. Upon his return to Fleetwood, he forced himself into first team contention and scored on his EFL debut on 7 April after replacing Daniel Batty as a substitute in a 2–1 defeat to Cambridge United at the Abbey Stadium. He made a further four appearances for the Cods as they finished in 13th position.

In January 2024, Quitirna signed a new long-term contract with the club, keeping him at the club until June 2026 with the option for a further year.

=== Crawley Town ===
On 25 July 2024, Quitirna returned to League One following Fleetwood Town's relegation, joining newly promoted Crawley Town for an undisclosed fee on an initial two-year deal. He scored on his debut for the club as Crawley beat Blackpool 2–1 in the opening game of the season.

=== Wycombe Wanderers ===
On 20 June 2025, Quitirna returned to League One following Crawley Town's relegation, joining Wycombe Wanderers for an undisclosed fee.

== Career statistics ==
As of match played 11 April 2026

Appearances and goals by club, season and competition
Club	Season	League			National Cup (Note: Includes FA Cup & FAI Cup)		League Cup (Note: Includes EFL Cup)		Other		Total	
Club	Season	Division	Apps	Goals	Apps	Goals	Apps	Goals	Apps	Goals	Apps	Goals
AFC Hornchurch	2017–18	Isthmian League Division One North	0	0	0	0	—		0	0	0	0
Charlton Athletic
Charlton Athletic	2018–19	League One	0	0	0	0	0	0	0	0	0	0
Charlton Athletic	2019–20	Championship	0	0	0	0	1	0	—		1	0
Charlton Athletic	2020–21	League One	0	0	0	0	0	0	1 (Note: One appearance in the EFL Trophy)	0	1	0
Charlton Athletic	Total		0	0	0	0	1	0	1	0	2	0
Waterford	2021	LOI Premier Division	16	6	3	1	—		1 (Note: One appearance in 2021 League of Ireland promotion/relegation playoffs)	0	20	7
Waterford	2022	LOI First Division	27	9	3	1	—		5 (Note: One appearance in the Munster Senior Cup & four appearances and three goals in the 2022 League of Ireland promotion/relegation playoffs)	3	35	13
Waterford	2023	LOI First Division	—		—		—		1 (Note: One appearance in the Munster Senior Cup)	1	1	1
Waterford	Total		43	15	6	2	—		7	4	56	21
Fleetwood Town	2022–23	League One	5	1	—		—		—		5	1
Fleetwood Town	2023–24	League One	24	4	0	0	1	0	1 (Note: One appearance in the EFL Trophy)	0	26	4
Fleetwood Town	Total		29	5	0	0	1	0	1	0	31	5
Altrincham (loan)	2022–23	National League	0	0	—		—		1 (Note: One appearance in the FA Trophy)	1	1	1
Crawley Town	2024–25	League One	34	8	0	0	2	0	2 (Note: Two appearances in the EFL Trophy)	0	38	8
Wycombe Wanderers	2025–26	League One	33	6	1	0	2	0	3 (Note: Three appearances in the EFL Trophy)	0	39	6
Career total			139	34	7	2	6	0	15	5	167	41

== Honours ==
Individual

- League of Ireland First Division Team of the Season: 2022
