= Magnus Westergaard =

Danish footballer (born 1998)

Personal information
- Full name: Magnus Hee Westergaard
- Date of birth: 27 May 1998 (age 28)
- Place of birth: Frederiksberg, Denmark
- Height: 1.87 m (6 ft 2 in)
- Position: Midfielder

Team information
- Current team: Vålerenga
- Number: 28

Youth career
- 2004–2011: Frederiksberg Boldklub
- 2011–2014: Copenhagen
- 2014–2018: Lyngby

Senior career*
Years	Team	Apps	(Gls)
2018–2023	Lyngby	75	(5)
2020–2021	→ Hvidovre (loan)	22	(4)
2023–2025	Viborg	54	(5)
2025–2026	Wycombe Wanderers	14	(0)
2026–	Vålerenga	21	(1)
- * Club domestic league appearances and goals as of 15:41, 20 September 2026 (UTC)

Magnus Hee Westergaard (Danish pronunciation: [ˈvestɐˌkɒˀ]; born 27 May 1998) is a Danish professional footballer who plays as a midfielder for Eliteserien club Vålerenga.

== Career ==
=== Lyngby ===
Born in Frederiksberg, Capital Region of Denmark, Westergaard began playing football as a youth for Frederiksberg Boldklub in 2004. In 2011, he moved to the FC Copenhagen School of Excellence where he stayed for three years before joining Lyngby Boldklub at U17 level.

Westergaard graduated through the Lyngby academy, before making his first-team debut as a starter in a 3–0 Danish Superliga defeat to OB on 22 April 2018.

He was permanently promoted to the first team in the summer of 2018 after the club had suffered relegation to the Danish second tier. Westergaard signed a one-and-a-half-year contract extension with Lyngby on 4 January 2019. Six months later, after Lyngby had reached promotion to the Superliga after one season, he signed another contract extension, keeping him at the club until the summer of 2022.

==== Loan to Hvidovre ====
On 1 October 2020, Westergaard joined Danish 1st Division club Hvidovre IF on a loan deal for the rest of 2020. On 4 October, he made his debut for the club in a 2–1 away win over Vendsyssel. Later that month, he scored his first goal in a 1–5 home loss to Silkeborg.

In December 2020, Westergaard extended his loan deal by a further six months. In his season with Hvidovre, Westergaard scored 5 goals in 25 total appearances, including one in the Danish Cup round of 16 against Vejle Boldklub, which saw his club knocked out after a 2–3 loss.

==== Return to Lyngby ====
Westergaard returned to Lyngby after his loan deal with Hvidovre expired. In the meantime, Lyngby had suffered relegation to the second-tier. Westergaard immediately appeared in the starting lineup upon his return, in a 2–1 away win over Nykøbing. He was a starter during the 2021–22 campaign, in which Lyngby managed to win promotion back to the Superliga. Westergaard finished the season with 27 total appearances in which he scored four goals.

=== Viborg ===
On 30 January 2023, Westergaard was sold to Viborg FF, signing a deal until the end of 2025. He scored his first league goal for Viborg FF in a 3–0 away win against Brøndby IF.

=== Wycombe Wanderers ===
On 16 January 2025, Westergaard signed for English League One club Wycombe Wanderers. He made his competitive debut for the club on 28 January, replacing Tyreeq Bakinson in the 74th minute of a 2–1 home win over Barnsley.

=== Vålerenga ===
On 8 January 2026, Westergaard joined Eliteserien club Vålerenga for an undisclosed fee. He debuted on 30 January 2026 during the 4–0 friendly victory against Orgryte.

== Personal life ==
Westergaard is the son of sailor Stig Westergaard, who participated in the 1992 Summer Olympics in Finn and in the 1996 Summer Olympics in Soling.

== Career statistics ==
As of 20 September 2026

Appearances and goals by club, season and competition
Club	Season	League			National cup (Note: Includes appearances in Danish Cup, FA Cup, Norwegian Football Cup)		League cup (Note: Includes appearances in EFL Cup)		Other		Total	
Club	Season	Division	Apps	Goals	Apps	Goals	Apps	Goals	Apps	Goals	Apps	Goals
Lyngby	2017–18	Danish Superliga	1	0	0	0	—		—		1	0
Lyngby	2018–19	Danish 1st Division	14	1	1	0	—		2 (Note: Appearances in Superliga relegation play-offs)	0	17	1
Lyngby	2019–20	Danish Superliga	19	0	1	0	—		—		20	0
Lyngby	2020–21	Danish Superliga	0	0	0	0	—		—		0	0
Lyngby	2021–22	Danish 1st Division	26	4	1	0	—		—		27	4
Lyngby	2022–23	Danish Superliga	15	0	1	0	—		—		16	0
Lyngby	Total		75	5	4	0	—		2	0	81	5
Hvidovre (loan)	2020–21	Danish 1st Division	22	4	3	1	—		—		25	5
Viborg	2022–23	Danish Superliga	16	1	2	0	—		—		18	1
Viborg	2023–24	Danish Superliga	23	2	1	0	—		—		24	2
Viborg	2024–25	Danish Superliga	15	2	5	3	—		—		20	5
Viborg	Total		54	5	8	3	—		0	0	62	8
Wycombe Wanderers	2024–25	League One	5	0	1	0	—		2 (Note: Appearance(s) in EFL League One play-offs)	0	8	0
Wycombe Wanderers	2025–26	League One	9	0	2	0	3	1	4 (Note: Includes appearances in EFL Trophy)	0	18	1
Wycombe Wanderers	Total		14	0	3	0	3	1	6	0	26	1
Vålerenga	2026	Eliteserien	21	1	1	0	—		—		22	1
Career total			186	15	19	4	3	1	8	0	216	20
